= List of Earth-crossing asteroids =

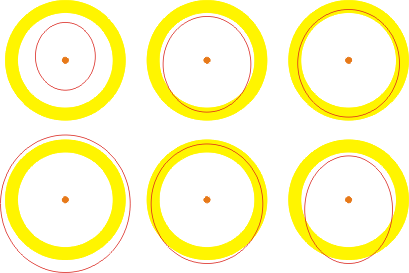
Diagram showing different asteroid paths. The yellow band marks the Earth's orbit; the red line marks the asteroid's path. Outer-grazer(†): middle, bottom Crosser: right, bottom

Close approach trajectory of 2004 FH in the Earth–Moon system

Flyby of the near-Earth asteroid 2004 FH in March 2004. The other object that flashes by is an artificial satellite. Images were by Stefano Sposetti and composite by Raoul Behrend of Geneva Observatory

An Earth-crosser is a near-Earth asteroid whose orbit crosses that of Earth as observed from the ecliptic pole of Earth's orbit. The known numbered Earth-crossers are listed here. Those Earth-crossers whose semi-major axes are smaller than Earth's are Aten asteroids; the remaining ones are Apollo asteroids. (See also the Amor asteroids.)

An asteroid with an Earth-crossing orbit is not necessarily in danger of colliding with Earth. The orbit of an Earth-crossing asteroid may not even intersect with that of Earth. This apparent contradiction arises because many asteroids have highly inclined orbits, so although they may have a perihelion less than that of Earth, their paths can never cross. An asteroid for which there is some possibility of a collision with Earth at a future date and which is above a certain size is classified as a potentially hazardous asteroid (PHA). Specifically, an asteroid is a PHA if its Earth minimum orbital intersection distance (MOID) is <0.05 AU and its absolute magnitude is 22 or brighter. The concept of PHA is intended to replace the now abandoned strict definition of ECA (Earth-crossing asteroid) which existed for a few years. Determining if an asteroid was an ECA required calculation of its orbits millennia into the future, including planetary gravitational perturbations, to assess whether a collision with Earth was possible and this has proved to be impractical.

Having a small MOID is not a guarantee of a collision. On the other hand, small gravitational perturbations of the asteroid around its orbit from planets that it passes can significantly alter its path. For instance, 99942 Apophis will approach Earth so closely in 2029 that it will get under the orbit of the Earth's geostationary satellites.

Of the Earth-crossing asteroids, 3753 Cruithne is notable for having an orbit that has the same period as Earth's.

== List ==
- 1566 Icarus
- 1620 Geographos
- 1685 Toro
- 1862 Apollo
- 1863 Antinous
- 1864 Daedalus
- 1865 Cerberus
- 1866 Sisyphus
- 1981 Midas
- 2016 NL56
- 2062 Aten
- 2063 Bacchus
- 2100 Ra-Shalom
- 2101 Adonis
- 2102 Tantalus
- 2135 Aristaeus
- 2201 Oljato
- 2212 Hephaistos
- 2329 Orthos
- 2340 Hathor
- 3103 Eger
- 3200 Phaethon
- 3360 Syrinx
- 3361 Orpheus
- 3362 Khufu
- 3554 Amun
- 3671 Dionysus †
- 3752 Camillo †
- 3753 Cruithne
- 3838 Epona
- 4015 Wilson–Harrington †
- 4034 Vishnu
- 4179 Toutatis
- 4183 Cuno
- 4197 Morpheus
- 4257 Ubasti
- 4341 Poseidon
- 4450 Pan
- 4486 Mithra
- 4544 Xanthus
- 4581 Asclepius
- 4660 Nereus
- 4769 Castalia
- (4953) 1990 MU
- 5011 Ptah
- (5131) 1990 BG
- 5143 Heracles
- (5189) 1990 UQ
- 5381 Sekhmet
- (5496) 1973 NA
- (5590) 1990 VA
- (5604) 1992 FE
- (5645) 1990 SP
- (5660) 1974 MA
- (5693) 1993 EA
- 5731 Zeus
- 5786 Talos
- (5828) 1991 AM
- (6037) 1988 EG
- (6047) 1991 TB1
- (6053) 1993 BW3 †
- 6063 Jason
- 6239 Minos
- (6455) 1992 HE
- 6489 Golevka †
- (6611) 1993 VW
- (7025) 1993 QA †
- 7092 Cadmus
- (7335) 1989 JA
- (7341) 1991 VK
- (7350) 1993 VA
- (7482) 1994 PC1
- (7753) 1988 XB
- (7822) 1991 CS
- (7888) 1993 UC
- (7889) 1994 LX
- (8014) 1990 MF
- (8035) 1992 TB
- (8176) 1991 WA
- (8201) 1994 AH2
- (8507) 1991 CB1
- (8566) 1996 EN
- (9058) 1992 JB †
- 9162 Kwiila
- (9202) 1993 PB
- (9856) 1991 EE
- (10115) 1992 SK
- (10145) 1994 CK1
- (10165) 1995 BL2
- 10563 Izhdubar
- (10636) 1998 QK56
- 11066 Sigurd
- 11311 Peleus †
- (11405) 1999 CV3
- 11500 Tomaiyowit
- 11885 Summanus
- (12538) 1998 OH
- 12711 Tukmit
- 12923 Zephyr †
- 13651 Wugang
- 14827 Hypnos
- (16816) 1997 UF9
- (16834) 1997 WU22
- (16960) 1998 QS52
- (17181) 1999 UM3
- (17182) 1999 VU
- (17188) 1999 WC2
- (17511) 1992 QN
- (20236) 1998 BZ7
- (20425) 1998 VD35
- (20429) 1998 YN1
- (20826) 2000 UV13
- (22099) 2000 EX106
- (22753) 1998 WT
- (22771) 1999 CU3
- (23187) 2000 PN9
- (24443) 2000 OG
- (24445) 2000 PM8 †
- 24761 Ahau
- 25143 Itokawa
- (25330) 1999 KV4
- (26379) 1999 HZ1
- (26663) 2000 XK47
- (27002) 1998 DV9 †
- (29075) 1950 DA
- (30825) 1990 TG1
- (30997) 1995 UO5
- (31662) 1999 HP11
- (31669) 1999 JT6
- (33342) 1998 WT24
- (35107) 1991 VH
- (35396) 1997 XF11
- (35670) 1998 SU27
- (36236) 1999 VV
- (36284) 2000 DM8
- (37638) 1993 VB
- 37655 Illapa
- 38086 Beowulf
- (38239) 1999 OR3
- (40267) 1999 GJ4
- (41429) 2000 GE2
- (42286) 2001 TN41
- (52340) 1992 SY †
- (52750) 1998 KK17
- (52760) 1998 ML14
- (52762) 1998 MT24
- (53319) 1999 JM8
- (53409) 1999 LU7
- (53426) 1999 SL5
- (53429) 1999 TF5
- (53550) 2000 BF19
- (53789) 2000 ED104 †
- 54509 YORP
- (55408) 2001 TC2
- (55532) 2001 WG2
- (65679) 1989 UQ
- (65690) 1991 DG
- (65717) 1993 BX3 †
- (65733) 1993 PC
- 65803 Didymos †
- (65909) 1998 FH12
- (66008) 1998 QH2
- (66063) 1998 RO1
- (66146) 1998 TU3
- (66253) 1999 GT3
- 66391 Moshup
- (66400) 1999 LT7
- (67381) 2000 OL8
- (67399) 2000 PJ6
- (68216) 2001 CV26
- (68267) 2001 EA16
- (68346) 2001 KZ66
- (68347) 2001 KB67
- (68348) 2001 LO7
- (68372) 2001 PM9
- (68548) 2001 XR31
- (68950) 2002 QF15
- 69230 Hermes
- (85182) 1991 AQ
- (85236) 1993 KH
- 85585 Mjolnir
- (85640) 1998 OX4
- (85713) 1998 SS49
- (85770) 1998 UP1
- (85774) 1998 UT18
- (85818) 1998 XM4
- (85938) 1999 DJ4
- (85953) 1999 FK21
- (85989) 1999 JD6
- (85990) 1999 JV6
- (86039) 1999 NC43
- (86450) 2000 CK33
- (86666) 2000 FL10
- (86667) 2000 FO10
- (86819) 2000 GK137 †
- (86829) 2000 GR146
- (86878) 2000 HD24
- (87024) 2000 JS66
- (87025) 2000 JT66
- (87309) 2000 QP
- (87311) 2000 QJ1
- (87684) 2000 SY2
- (88213) 2001 AF2
- (88254) 2001 FM129
- (88710) 2001 SL9
- (88959) 2001 TZ44
- (89136) 2001 US16 †
- (89958) 2002 LY45
- (89959) 2002 NT7
- (90075) 2002 VU94
- (90147) 2002 YK14 †
- (90367) 2003 LC5
- (90403) 2003 YE45
- (90416) 2003 YK118
- 99942 Apophis
- (136617) 1994 CC
- (153591) 2001 SN263
- 367943 Duende
- (374158) 2004 UL
- (386454) 2008 XM
- (394130) 2006 HY51
- (410777) 2009 FD
- (518635) 2008 HO3
- 524522 Zoozve
- 2005 HC4
- 2008 FF5
- 2012 XE133
- 2013 ND15
- (696513) 2016 NL56
- 2020 QG

Notes: † outer-grazer

== See also ==
- Earth-grazing fireball
- List of asteroid close approaches to Earth
- Asteroid impact avoidance
- List of Mercury-crossing minor planets
- List of Venus-crossing minor planets
- List of Mars-crossing minor planets
- List of Jupiter-crossing minor planets
