= List of Mercury-crossing minor planets =

A Mercury crosser or Mercury grazer is an asteroid whose orbit crosses that of Mercury. The Mercury crossers proper have aphelia outside Mercury's (0.4667 AU) and perihelia inside Mercury's (0.3075 AU), whereas those listed here as outer grazers have perihelia within Mercury's aphelion but not within its perihelion. All have semi-major axes larger than Mercury's, and hence there are no known inner grazers.

== List ==
Mercury crossers proper have aphelia outside Mercury's (0.4667 AU) and perihelia inside Mercury's (0.3075 AU). As of 19 August 2026, 525 Mercury crossers were known. (Most values have been rounded to three decimals.)

Designation		p (AU)	a (AU)	Q (AU)	i (°)	e	H	Orbit class	Notes
	2024 YL3	0.070	2.082	4.094	18.935	0.9664	21.9	Apollo	Has the smallest perihelion of any known asteroid.
	2005 HC4	0.070	1.824	3.578	8.408	0.9614	20.7	Apollo	Has the second-smallest perihelion of any known asteroid.
	2020 BU13	0.073	2.470	4.866	9.181	0.9703	21.3	Apollo	Has the third-smallest perihelion of any known asteroid, and the highest eccentricity of any known asteroid in the inner solar system.
	2017 TC_{1}	0.076	2.493	4.910	9.288	0.9695	20.8	Apollo	Has the fourth-smallest perihelion of any known asteroid.
	2017 MM7	0.080	2.062	4.045	23.460	0.9616	21.1	Apollo	
	2008 FF5	0.080	2.278	4.476	2.622	0.9651	23.1	Apollo	
	2015 EV	0.081	2.032	3.983	11.356	0.9603	22.5	Apollo	
394130	2006 HY_{51}	0.082	2.589	5.096	33.455	0.9684	17.1	Apollo	Has the smallest perihelion of any numbered asteroid. 1.218 ± 0.218
	2021 AF3	0.086	1.314	2.542	7.271	0.9349	23.2	Apollo	
	2016 GU2	0.087	2.054	4.021	10.277	0.9575	24.0	Apollo	
	2022 XK	0.090	1.405	2.719	20.992	0.9357	20.5	Apollo	
	2019 JZ6	0.091	2.475	4.860	24.229	0.9633	21.0	Apollo	
	2019 AM13	0.091	1.296	2.502	16.649	0.9298	22.0	Apollo	
137924	2000 BD_{19}	0.092	0.876	1.661	25.732	0.8950	17.2	Aten	Has the second-smallest perihelion of any numbered asteroid. 0.970 ± 0.39
374158	2004 UL	0.093	1.266	2.440	23.777	0.9266	18.8	Apollo	Has the third-smallest perihelion of any numbered asteroid.
	2022 HB4	0.093	2.034	3.970	9.358	0.9542	20.0	Apollo	
394392	2007 EP_{88}	0.096	0.837	1.579	20.747	0.8859	18.5	Aten	Has the fourth-smallest perihelion of any numbered asteroid. 0.636 ± 0.038 kilometers
	2024 MH	0.096	2.865	5.634	16.619	0.9665	19.3	Apollo	
	2011 KE	0.100	2.206	4.312	5.880	0.9545	19.8	Apollo	
465402	2008 HW_{1}	0.103	2.587	5.070	10.485	0.9600	17.3	Apollo	Has the fifth-smallest perihelion of any numbered asteroid.
	2015 HG	0.105	2.100	4.095	17.734	0.9501	21.0	Apollo	
	2012 US68	0.105	2.503	4.901	25.808	0.9579	18.3	Apollo	
	2023 XF5	0.107	2.472	4.836	23.252	0.9567	21.1	Apollo	
	2024 WS1	0.108	2.450	4.791	22.776	0.9558	26.1	Apollo	
	2011 XA3	0.109	1.467	2.825	28.026	0.9260	20.4	Apollo	
	2018 GG5	0.110	1.987	3.864	16.757	0.9447	19.8	Apollo	
399457	2002 PD_{43}	0.109	2.507	4.905	25.951	0.9564	19.3	Apollo	
386454	2008 XM	0.111	1.222	2.334	5.447	0.9092	20.0	Apollo	0.367 ± 0.009 kilometers
431760	2008 HE	0.112	2.261	4.410	9.825	0.9504	18.1	Apollo	
	2020 DD	0.116	2.483	4.849	2.338	0.9534	23.5	Apollo	
276033	2002 AJ_{129}	0.117	1.370	2.624	15.457	0.9149	18.7	Apollo	
	2019 VE3	0.117	1.174	2.231	2.536	0.9006	23.3	Apollo	
	2020 GB2	0.117	2.339	4.561	15.224	0.9500	21.1	Apollo	
425755	2011 CP_{4}	0.118	0.911	1.705	9.443	0.8703	21.2	Aten	
	1995 CR	0.119	0.907	1.695	4.067	0.8684	21.7	Aten	
	2022 JX	0.119	2.808	5.497	42.859	0.9576	23.3	Apollo	
	2025 KP4	0.120	0.861	1.602	9.508	0.8606	22.6	Aten	
612162	2000 LK	0.121	2.184	4.247	16.575	0.9445	18.4	Apollo	
	2007 GT3	0.122	2.005	3.889	25.958	0.9390	19.8	Apollo	
	2020 TS2	0.123	2.502	4.881	20.009	0.9507	19.0	Apollo	
	2022 YE4	0.123	1.290	2.457	13.732	0.9047	20.6	Apollo	
	2020 HY2	0.124	2.314	4.504	11.394	0.9462	24.9	Apollo	
677579	2017 AF5	0.124	2.479	4.833	20.913	0.9498	17.7	Apollo	
	2004 QX2	0.125	1.285	2.445	19.055	0.9025	21.7	Apollo	
	2025 RK3	0.126	1.258	2.390	15.108	0.8999	21.3	Apollo	
	2019 YV2	0.126	1.227	2.328	6.460	0.8972	21.9	Apollo	
	2015 KO_{120}	0.127	1.822	3.516	2.135	0.9298	22.1	Apollo	
289227	2004 XY_{60}	0.130	0.640	1.150	23.762	0.7967	18.9	Aten	
	2024 DG	0.130	1.242	2.353	23.393	0.8590	20.4	Apollo	
	2021 PH_{27}	0.133	0.462	0.790	31.939	0.7115	17.7	Atira	Has the smallest semi-major axis of any known asteroid.
	2023 HJ7	0.133	2.030	3.928	18.231	0.9347	23.0	Apollo	
	2007 PR10	0.133	1.232	2.331	20.930	0.8924	20.9	Apollo	
504181	2006 TC	0.135	1.538	2.941	19.547	0.9120	18.8	Apollo	
	2025 GN_{1}	0.136	0.462	0.788	32.835	0.7051	20.1	Atira	Has the second smallest semi-major axis of any known asteroid. Related to 2021 PH_{27}.
	2011 BT59	0.137	2.493	4.849	3.667	0.9449	20.8	Apollo	
	2019 UJ12	0.137	2.423	4.709	27.490	0.9435	22.4	Apollo	
	2013 JA36	0.138	2.667	5.196	42.506	0.9484	21.0	Apollo	
	2008 MG1	0.139	0.783	1.428	5.719	0.8228	19.9	Aten	
	2013 HK11	0.139	2.189	4.239	17.704	0.9364	20.7	Apollo	
3200	Phaethon	0.140	1.271	2.403	22.260	0.8898	14.3	Apollo	Largest Mercury crosser. Has the smallest perihelion of any named asteroid. 6.25 ± 0.15 kilometers
	2017 SK10	0.140	2.056	3.971	24.516	0.9319	21.4	Apollo	
	2020 VL4	0.141	2.121	4.102	56.902	0.9337	18.5	Apollo	
	2023 FS5	0.141	2.476	4.811	21.846	0.9430	23.0	Apollo	
	2023 ST6	0.141	2.511	4.882	4.261	0.9438	24.9	Apollo	
	2023 TS3	0.142	1.227	2.311	11.304	0.8841	20.3	Apollo	
	2024 HW5	0.142	2.018	3.894	6.036	0.9296	23.4	Apollo	
	2013 YC	0.143	2.496	4.850	2.794	0.9428	21.3	Apollo	
	2023 CF	0.144	2.101	4.058	1.029	0.9315	25.0	Apollo	
	2020 HE	0.146	2.515	4.883	20.488	0.9418	23.7	Apollo	
	2010 JG87	0.148	2.770	5.393	16.752	0.9467	19.2	Apollo	0.408 ± 0.017 kilometers
	2015 DU_{180}	0.150	1.927	3.703	4.852	0.9219	20.8	Apollo	0.435 ± 0.174 kilometers
	2021 LF	0.150	2.051	3.952	12.748	0.9269	21.3	Apollo	
	2026 DG_{19}	0.150	1.260	3.160	22.600	0.8800	21.8	Apollo	
	2021 CM7	0.151	2.070	3.989	7.539	0.9272	21.1	Apollo	
	2025 NZ1	0.152	2.230	4.308	11.293	0.9320	20.5	Apollo	
482533	2012 UA_{34}	0.156	0.786	1.416	19.800	0.8016	19.7	Aten	
	2021 JF6	0.158	2.463	4.769	9.224	0.9358	19.7	Apollo	
	2016 NT22	0.161	1.246	2.330	17.783	0.8704	19.5	Apollo	
155140	2005 UD	0.163	1.275	2.387	28.678	0.8722	17.3	Apollo	Possibly a fragment of 3200 Phaethon
	2005 EL70	0.163	2.475	4.786	16.764	0.9342	24.0	Apollo	
	2019 LZ1	0.166	2.232	4.299	9.491	0.9258	19.8	Apollo	
	2017 HE4	0.165	2.893	5.620	41.070	0.9428	21.2	Apollo	
364136	2006 CJ	0.166	0.677	1.187	10.232	0.7549	20.2	Aten	
105140	2000 NL_{10}	0.167	0.914	1.661	32.528	0.8170	15.8	Aten	1.946 ± 0.059 kilometers
679657	2020 BE15	0.168	1.611	3.053	16.538	0.8955	20.1	Apollo	
	2022 SC6	0.168	1.005	1.841	6.216	0.8329	22.4	Apollo	
	2019 NF6	0.170	2.192	4.214	19.749	0.9225	20.1	Apollo	
620071	2011 WN15	0.173	1.217	2.261	33.450	0.8580	19.7	Apollo	
	2019 GQ2	0.174	2.562	4.950	39.095	0.9321	18.9	Apollo	
	2013 WM	0.175	2.083	3.992	4.157	0.9162	23.9	Apollo	
	2020 KR4	0.175	1.833	3.492	14.948	0.9046	21.0	Apollo	
302169	2001 TD_{45}	0.177	0.797	1.416	25.391	0.7775	19.9	Aten	
	2023 RU12	0.177	1.079	1.981	3.823	0.8357	22.2	Apollo	
	2005 RV24	0.178	1.506	2.833	36.259	0.8818	20.5	Apollo	
	2022 DQ	0.178	2.618	5.058	4.731	0.9318	26.0	Apollo	
	2023 OF5	0.178	1.772	3.367	11.396	0.8997	21.0	Apollo	
141851	2002 PM_{6}	0.179	1.198	2.216	19.135	0.8502	17.8	Apollo	
527977	2008 EY_{68}	0.179	0.745	1.311	19.794	0.7599	22.3	Apollo	
	2023 BK17	0.179	0.621	1.064	4.571	0.7119	25.0	Aten	
	2022 XO2	0.180	0.697	1.214	23.070	0.7417	23.8	Aten	
	2023 UZ1	0.180	0.963	1.747	18.770	0.8134	22.8	Aten	
	2013 AJ91	0.181	2.531	4.882	33.297	0.9286	19.3	Apollo	
	2015 VQ_{64}	0.181	1.193	2.206	8.528	0.8482	21.5	Apollo	
	2019 AN7	0.181	1.192	2.202	23.768	0.8483	21.7	Apollo	
267223	2001 DQ_{8}	0.182	1.842	3.502	12.779	0.9009	18.1	Apollo	
	2023 UV	0.183	2.407	4.631	17.223	0.9240	23.8	Apollo	
259221	2003 BA_{21}	0.184	1.100	2.017	23.712	0.8332	19.1	Apollo	
	2020 XV6	0.184	2.041	3.898	5.770	0.9098	22.7	Apollo	
	2011 YX62	0.185	2.525	4.865	8.618	0.9267	23.0	Apollo	
	2017 EP22	0.185	1.969	3.752	14.547	0.9058	22.4	Apollo	
1566	Icarus	0.186	1.078	1.970	22.830	0.8270	16.9	Apollo	First Mercury crosser discovered. ~1 kilometer
	2021 BD	0.186	0.863	1.541	2.491	0.7580	26.9	Aten	
	2022 AU1	0.186	2.559	4.932	26.203	0.9273	20.0	Apollo	
5786	Talos	0.187	1.081	1.976	23.228	0.8268	17.1	Apollo	
89958	2002 LY_{45}	0.187	1.641	3.096	9.911	0.8863	17.0	Apollo	
	2023 RC8	0.187	0.704	1.220	27.120	0.7338	21.9	Aten	
	2009 HU58	0.188	2.066	3.945	35.825	0.9092	19.1	Apollo	
	2018 YC2	0.188	2.530	4.872	16.124	0.9256	22.7	Apollo	
506491	2003 UW_{29}	0.189	1.170	2.150	3.759	0.8385	20.6	Apollo	
	2025 YS5	0.189	1.085	1.981	22.648	0.8254	23.0	Apollo	
	2015 RD_{36}	0.190	2.543	4.896	0.443	0.9251	22.5	Apollo	
	2019 LU1	0.190	1.527	2.864	7.351	0.8758	24.2	Apollo	
	2020 KG6	0.191	1.130	2.069	22.440	0.8308	19.3	Apollo	
387505	1998 KN_{3}	0.195	1.542	2.888	2.291	0.8733	18.4	Apollo	1.060 ± 0.020 kilometers
	2020 HD9	0.195	2.245	4.295	19.538	0.9133	19.5	Apollo	
	2007 MK_{6}	0.196	1.081	1.966	25.125	0.8188	20.2	Apollo	
	2015 DZ_{53}	0.196	1.511	2.825	8.334	0.8702	20.8	Apollo	
	2015 KJ_{122}	0.196	0.785	1.375	5.067	0.7503	22.0	Aten	
455426	2003 MT_{9}	0.197	2.533	4.869	6.831	0.9222	18.6	Apollo	0.685 ± 0.269 kilometers
	2010 VA_{12}	0.199	1.269	2.340	37.399	0.8434	19.5	Apollo	
	2023 XY13	0.199	1.639	3.076	23.471	0.8786	19.5	Aten	
	2024 BT6	0.199	1.607	1.607	40.953	0.8761	21.2	Aten	
66391	Moshup	0.200	0.642	1.085	38.886	0.6884	16.6	Aten	1.317 ± 0.040 kilometers
153201	2000 WO_{107}	0.200	0.912	1.623	7.770	0.7807	19.3	Aten	0.510 ± 0.083 kilometers
141079	2001 XS_{30}	0.200	1.164	2.129	28.538	0.8282	17.7	Apollo	
139289	2001 KR_{1}	0.200	1.260	2.319	23.253	0.8411	17.6	Apollo	1.126 ± 0.239 kilometers
	2016 TE56	0.200	2.025	3.851	24.578	0.9014	20.1	Apollo	
	2023 EL1	0.200	1.926	3.652	6.970	0.8963	23.4	Apollo	
	2014 UV_{116}	0.201	0.917	1.633	42.308	0.9171	23.6	Aten	
	2023 HV4	0.201	2.147	4.093	4.131	0.9062	24.7	Apollo	
	1996 BT	0.202	1.202	2.203	11.992	0.8322	23.0	Apollo	
143637	2003 LP_{6}	0.203	1.746	3.289	43.574	0.8836	16.4	Apollo	
	2020 RT_{7}	0.204	2.559	4.914	12.123	0.9204	21.8	Apollo	
	2019 BH_{4}	0.204	2.445	4.686	20.913	0.9166	21.1	Apollo	
329915	2005 MB	0.204	0.985	1.767	41.384	0.7929	17.1	Aten	1.012 ± 0.139 kilometers
	2005 EP_{1}	0.205	0.893	1.580	16.326	0.7704	23.7	Aten	
438116	2005 NX_{44}	0.205	2.214	4.223	36.639	0.9074	17.4	Apollo	
	2015 QN_{3}	0.205	2.492	4.778	19.940	0.9176	19.5	Apollo	
	2013 RG_{74}	0.207	0.693	1.180	6.474	0.7017	23.3	Aten	
	2017 DN_{109}	0.207	1.196	2.184	7.089	0.8268	21.8	Apollo	
	2015 OC_{22}	0.207	2.149	4.090	11.632	0.9035	20.0	Apollo	
	2019 BE_{5}	0.208	0.610	1.012	1.436	0.6591	25.1	Aten	
	2015 CG_{13}	0.209	2.508	4.808	7.126	0.9166	24.1	Apollo	
369296	2009 SU_{19}	0.209	2.081	3.952	14.528	0.8994	17.9	Apollo	
	2014 RE_{11}	0.209	0.726	1.243	29.592	0.7117	22.7	Aten	
	2009 UX_{19}	0.210	1.255	2.299	15.999	0.8324	18.9	Apollo	
184990	2006 KE_{89}	0.212	1.053	1.895	45.104	0.7991	16.4	Apollo	2.039 ± 0.148 kilometers
	2008 JN	0.212	1.077	1.943	32.028	0.8034	20.6	Apollo	
	2016 QU_{1}	0.212	2.230	4.247	23.342	0.9049	19.2	Apollo	0.661 ± 0.171 kilometers
467372	2004 LG	0.213	2.064	3.916	71.154	0.8969	18.0	Apollo	Highly inclined orbit. 0.874 ± 0.012 kilometers
308043	2004 TH_{10}	0.214	1.250	2.287	14.297	0.8287	18.6	Apollo	
	2018 JD_{2}	0.214	1.823	3.432	50.985	0.8824	18.9	Apollo	
	2003 UC_{5}	0.215	1.185	2.156	36.796	0.8185	20.1	Apollo	
66253	1999 GT_{3}	0.216	1.334	2.452	19.500	0.8377	18.4	Apollo	
471926	Jormungandr	0.218	1.466	2.713	23.574	0.8510	18.6	Apollo	
85953	1999 FK_{21}	0.219	0.739	1.258	12.605	0.7031	18.1	Aten	~0.59 kilometers
	2014 JS_{54}	0.220	2.074	3.939	3.363	0.8941	21.2	Apollo	
369986	1998 SO	0.221	0.732	1.243	30.342	0.6986	20.6	Aten	
141495	2002 EZ_{11}	0.221	1.114	2.008	51.916	0.8021	18.3	Apollo	
	2010 PK_{9}	0.221	0.682	1.143	12.594	0.6757	21.8	Aten	0.143 ± 0.008 kilometers
495829	1995 LG	0.223	1.065	1.906	43.581	0.7907	18.7	Apollo	
494706	2005 GL_{9}	0.223	2.142	4.061	20.023	0.8959	16.6	Apollo	
	2013 GV_{68}	0.224	1.706	3.187	5.980	0.8684	18.9	Apollo	
437844	1999 MN	0.225	0.674	1.122	2.022	0.6655	21.4	Aten	
538644	2016 FA_{4}	0.226	1.092	1.959	16.205	0.7935	19.5	Apollo	
	2017 KP_{34}	0.226	1.395	2.565	30.071	0.8382	19.5	Apollo	
152742	1998 XE_{12}	0.229	0.878	1.527	13.435	0.7392	19.1	Aten	0.413 ± 0.005 kilometers
	2012 BE_{124}	0.229	2.538	4.847	16.300	0.9096	19.6	Apollo	
	2017 CO_{32}	0.231	1.385	2.539	27.592	0.8330	19.4	Apollo	
489900	2008 KP	0.232	1.101	1.970	59.846	0.7896	18.9	Apollo	
	2002 EV_{11}	0.232	2.100	3.968	11.598	0.8894	20.0	Apollo	
	2016 XC_{2}	0.233	2.275	4.317	27.471	0.8977	23.6	Apollo	
	2019 WH_{6}	0.233	2.341	4.448	29.287	0.9004	18.8	Apollo	
	2012 EQ_{3}	0.233	1.314	2.396	8.434	0.8225	22.5	Apollo	
325102	2008 EY_{5}	0.234	0.626	1.019	5.110	0.6267	20.1	Aten	0.361 ± 0.006 kilometers
	2017 WP28	0.234	1.176	2.117	10.084	0.8010	20.8	Apollo	
	2015 FE_{37}	0.234	1.270	2.306	25.039	0.8156	20.1	Apollo	
	2014 JO_{25}	0.234	2.066	3.897	25.170	0.8866	17.8	Apollo	
	2013 DL_{1}	0.235	0.839	1.444	26.473	0.7202	21.1	Aten	
	2014 QO_{390}	0.235	1.667	3.100	24.612	0.8591	21.1	Apollo	
	2020 RR_{1}	0.235	1.186	2.137	14.882	0.8018	24.3	Apollo	
	2020 BT_{12}	0.236	2.214	4.191	30.160	0.8934	19.1	Apollo	
	2007 KG_{7}	0.237	1.779	3.321	4.737	0.8668	20.6	Apollo	
137052	Tjelvar	0.238	1.248	2.258	14.912	0.8096	16.9	Apollo	
	2010 KB_{8}	0.238	1.374	2.511	1.893	0.8269	24.0	Apollo	
	2015 DC_{200}	0.238	1.777	3.316	3.058	0.8659	20.5	Apollo	
	2001 VB	0.239	2.395	4.552	9.530	0.9004	18.4	Apollo	
	2017 FM_{102}	0.240	1.290	2.340	29.135	0.8142	21.9	Apollo	
	2019 GC_{4}	0.241	2.555	4.868	2.151	0.9057	24.6	Apollo	
225146	1999 YC	0.241	1.422	2.603	38.225	0.8305	17.2	Apollo	1.651 ± 0.175 kilometers
432509	2010 FF_{7}	0.242	1.405	2.568	16.176	0.8279	19.5	Apollo	
	2012 KA_{4}	0.242	1.100	1.958	5.806	0.7801	21.1	Apollo	
	2011 KU_{15}	0.242	1.954	3.666	4.400	0.8761	21.8	Apollo	
	2020 LD	0.242	1.215	2.188	3.677	0.8007	22.4	Apollo	
	2000 PN	0.243	1.022	1.800	22.866	0.7623	22.6	Apollo	
	2006 BC	0.243	1.406	2.570	18.101	0.8273	19.1	Apollo	
	2019 QU_{2}	0.243	0.824	1.404	11.325	0.7048	22.2	Aten	0.237 ± 0.114 kilometers
	2016 LV_{47}	0.244	1.801	3.359	15.241	0.8648	20.0	Apollo	
	2011 EL_{47}	0.245	1.631	3.017	25.427	0.8500	20.0	Apollo	
401998	2003 MO	0.245	1.970	3.695	21.434	0.8758	18.4	Apollo	
	2010 EF_{44}	0.245	2.187	4.129	38.023	0.8880	20.2	Apollo	
	2016 AF_{9}	0.245	2.511	4.777	22.658	0.9024	22.2	Apollo	
	2020 DU_{1}	0.245	1.946	3.648	15.358	0.8739	26.6	Apollo	
	2000 SG_{8}	0.246	2.467	4.689	24.134	0.9005	17.5	Apollo	
247517	2002 QY_{6}	0.246	0.817	1.388	12.755	0.6991	19.7	Aten	0.269 ± 0.005 kilometers
457059	2008 EG	0.246	0.943	1.640	26.785	0.7390	20.0	Aten	
	2019 AK_{11}	0.247	2.521	4.795	25.588	0.9022	19.4	Apollo	
	2003 YH_{136}	0.247	2.350	4.452	16.404	0.8949	19.4	Apollo	
242643	2005 NZ_{6}	0.247	1.833	3.420	8.418	0.8651	17.4	Apollo	1.989 ± 0.479 kilometers
	2013 YK_{148}	0.247	2.144	4.041	17.565	0.8846	18.8	Apollo	
	2015 KJ_{157}	0.248	0.945	1.642	36.887	1.073	19.2	Aten	
	2020 FD_{2}	0.248	3.001	5.755	0.273	0.9173	25.7	Apollo	
	2018 PB_{22}	0.250	1.440	2.631	45.336	0.8267	19.4	Apollo	
	2018 KK_{1}	0.250	0.640	1.029	13.918	0.6090	23.5	Aten	
	2016 FV_{7}	0.250	2.035	3.819	10.142	0.8770	23.1	Apollo	
	2011 EH17	0.250	0.731	1.212	2.985	0.6576	24.6	Aten	
	2026 CR_{1}	0.250	1.550	2.84	8.000	0.8400	21.3	Apollo	
	2018 WL_{1}	0.251	2.076	3.902	17.248	0.8739	21.5	Apollo	
	2017 JT_{2}	0.251	1.162	2.073	42.726	0.7838	18.8	Apollo	
	2006 LA	0.251	1.557	2.862	11.057	0.8386	18.8	Apollo	
	2020 FB_{5}	0.251	1.602	2.953	3.096	0.8431	24.8	Apollo	
	2002 AS_{4}	0.252	1.267	2.283	27.039	0.8014	21.7	Apollo	
	2016 BY_{14}	0.253	2.731	5.208	13.159	0.9074	23.9	Apollo	
509523	2007 XP_{3}	0.253	2.245	4.237	13.157	0.8872	19.3	Apollo	
	2017 MA_{1}	0.253	2.509	4.765	15.096	0.8991	21.7	Apollo	
	2006 BX_{147}	0.253	0.787	1.321	11.577	0.6780	21.5	Aten	
	2008 CG	0.254	1.378	2.503	20.887	0.8159	20.2	Apollo	
	2009 WY_{7}	0.254	0.650	1.045	4.001	0.6084	24.1	Aten	
	2014 LY_{21}	0.254	0.646	1.037	1.243	0.6059	29.1	Aten	
	2016 WH_{8}	0.255	2.440	4.626	15.621	0.8957	19.2	Apollo	
	2017 DC	0.255	2.145	4.035	15.740	0.8813	23.0	Apollo	
	2014 FH	0.255	1.737	3.218	12.008	0.8530	23.4	Apollo	
	2020 VC_{3}	0.255	1.185	2.114	17.208	0.7844	23.3	Apollo	
136874	1998 FH_{74}	0.256	2.203	4.150	21.140	0.8839	15.6	Apollo	3.398 ± 0.129 kilometers
1I	ʻOumuamua	0.256	N/A	N/A	122.742	1.2011	22.1	Interstellar object	Perihelion of 2018 Solar System approach.
40267	1999 GJ_{4}	0.257	1.339	2.421	34.492	0.8083	15.5	Apollo	1.641 ± 0.053 kilometers
	2014 EA_{49}	0.257	2.011	3.765	10.633	0.8723	20.0	Apollo	
	2011 KY_{15}	0.258	0.649	1.040	16.863	0.6028	24.1	Aten	
	2014 DE_{80}	0.258	1.476	2.693	26.662	0.8252	19.0	Apollo	
	2017 JJ2	0.258	0.692	1.125	12.154	0.6264	25.1	Aten	
	2012 LT_{7}	0.259	1.079	1.900	42.267	0.7604	19.0	Apollo	
530871	2011 WS_{2}	0.259	1.009	1.760	46.783	0.7435	17.2	Apollo	1.434 ± 0.056 kilometers
	2011 GS60	0.259	3.357	6.455	19.269	0.9229	19.0	Apollo	Largest confirmed orbit of any Mercury-crosser
	2019 SZ_{6}	0.259	1.193	2.127	12.559	0.7829	22.2	Apollo	
	2015 DO_{53}	0.260	2.534	4.808	29.086	0.8976	20.8	Apollo	
	2010 RV_{3}	0.260	2.151	4.042	8.802	0.8792	23.2	Apollo	
	2019 MQ_{2}	0.260	1.242	2.224	0.857	0.7906	24.2	Apollo	
	2011 WR_{46}	0.260	2.249	4.677	4.869	0.8946	20.0	Apollo	
	2017 SR17	0.260	2.498	4.736	28.439	0.8957	18.8	Apollo	
	2016 TA	0.260	2.384	4.508	7.215	0.8908	26.3	Apollo	
	2026 DX_{14}	0.260	1.710	3.160	12.20	0.8500	24.2	Apollo	
	2008 UX	0.261	0.817	1.374	21.741	0.6813	20.7	Aten	
	2014 SM_{260}	0.261	2.259	4.256	7.781	0.8842	21.0	Apollo	
	2014 GC_{49}	0.262	0.735	1.208	6.428	0.6440	28.6	Aten	
	2013 JX28	0.262	0.601	0.940	10.762	0.5640	20.1	Atira	
	2007 VL_{243}	0.262	0.965	1.668	43.334	0.7286	17.8	Aten	
331471	1984 QY_{1}	0.264	2.498	4.732	14.263	0.8945	15.6	Apollo	Third largest Mercury crosser
	2006 SO_{198}	0.264	1.927	3.591	9.766	0.8632	23.9	Apollo	
	2008 FP	0.264	2.575	4.886	3.395	0.8976	26.3	Apollo	
190788	2001 RT_{17}	0.264	1.268	2.272	20.109	0.7920	18.3	Apollo	
	2019 JA_{7}	0.265	1.657	3.050	17.143	0.8403	22.5	Apollo	
	2018 MN_{8}	0.265	0.848	1.430	12.376	0.6876	22.8	Aten	
	2006 OS_{9}	0.265	2.744	5.223	21.061	0.9034	17.8	Apollo	
	2011 TX_{8}	0.265	0.909	1.554	5.974	0.7084	21.9	Aten	
	2005 UR	0.266	2.248	4.230	6.933	0.8817	21.6	Apollo	
	2018 GY_{4}	0.266	0.918	1.570	17.237	0.7010	19.0	Aten	
	2018 QT_{1}	0.266	0.659	1.051	7.902	0.5954	22.3	Aten	
	2016 FA_{15}	0.266	1.171	2.075	14.277	0.7723	22.8	Apollo	
	2006 PF_{1}	0.267	2.194	4.122	14.050	0.8785	19.5	Apollo	
	2013 CY_{32}	0.267	2.031	3.794	17.922	0.8684	28.1	Apollo	
	2008 GD	0.267	1.198	2.128	21.774	0.7767	19.8	Apollo	
	2019 PR	0.268	2.528	4.789	15.225	0.8940	19.6	Apollo	
	2014 UQ_{114}	0.269	1.167	2.066	8.686	0.7697	22.4	Apollo	
369452	2010 LG_{14}	0.269	1.045	1.822	34.218	0.7428	17.9	Apollo	
	2017 UO	0.269	2.554	4.837	8.580	0.8946	20.2	Apollo	
190119	2004 VA_{64}	0.270	2.465	4.661	29.930	0.8906	17.1	Apollo	1.451 ± 0.698 kilometers
	2019 LP_{5}	0.270	1.378	2.486	26.065	0.8043	24.1	Apollo	
482798	2013 QK_{48}	0.271	1.586	2.901	19.013	0.8293	18.3	Apollo	
	2017 FU90	0.271	0.773	1.275	2.343	0.7731	25.2	Aten	
	2017 KQ_{34}	0.271	1.784	3.296	69.103	0.8478	18.7	Apollo	
	2019 OC_{5}	0.272	3.386	6.501	52.126	0.9198	18.2	Apollo	
	2012 TO_{139}	0.272	2.439	4.606	5.368	0.8886	19.7	Apollo	
	2015 YM_{10}	0.272	2.512	4.752	18.696	0.8919	19.8	Apollo	
	2013 VA_{10}	0.273	1.168	2.064	1.030	0.7664	22.2	Apollo	
	2008 CH_{116}	0.273	0.663	1.052	20.371	0.5875	19.2	Aten	0.322 ± 0.094 kilometers
153002	2000 JG_{5}	0.273	1.341	2.408	31.436	0.7960	18.2	Apollo	
189865	2003 NC	0.274	1.406	2.538	21.612	0.8054	19.3	Apollo	
	2010 CC_{19}	0.274	1.099	1.925	46.120	0.7511	22.3	Apollo	0.104 ± 0.005 kilometers
	2020 PD_{7}	0.275	2.234	4.194	77.561	0.8771	22.8	Apollo	
351370	2005 EY	0.275	2.517	4.759	17.232	0.8909	17.1	Apollo	
	2020 KK	0.276	0.888	1.501	20.694	0.6897	24.6	Aten	
	2016 CL_{136}	0.276	0.730	1.184	21.519	0.6222	21.4	Aten	0.123 ± 0.056 kilometers
417874	2007 NC_{5}	0.276	2.444	4.613	19.320	0.8872	18.1	Apollo	
526898	2007 HR	0.276	1.067	1.858	11.976	0.7415	20.6	Apollo	
	2009 CT_{5}	0.276	1.983	3.690	10.014	0.8608	18.8	Apollo	
	2014 JN_{2}	0.276	0.894	1.511	6.312	0.6911	24.3	Apollo	
66063	1998 RO_{1}	0.277	0.991	1.705	22.682	0.7201	18.1	Aten	Has a moon.
	2008 GJ_{110}	0.278	1.559	2.840	13.562	0.8218	20.5	Apollo	
202683	2006 US_{216}	0.279	0.637	0.995	3.432	0.5624	19.8	Aten	
164201	2004 EC	0.279	1.997	3.714	34.587	0.8600	15.7	Apollo	
	2011 FZ_{22}	0.280	2.366	4.451	7.940	0.8816	23.1	Apollo	
	2013 ND15	0.281	0.724	1.166	4.800	0.6119	24.1	Aten	First Venus trojan discovered.
	2018 VR_{9}	0.281	1.189	2.098	12.436	0.7638	22.7	Apollo	
467540	2006JF_{42}	0.281	0.672	1.063	5.951	0.5817	19.2	Apollo	
	2019 QK_{4}	0.282	2.546	4.810	20.405	0.8892	20.7	Apollo	
436325	2010 GR_{7}	0.283	1.831	3.380	24.142	0.8456	18.4	Apollo	0.452 ± 0.014 kilometers
	2015 BQ_{4}	0.283	2.565	4.847	36.273	0.8896	19.1	Apollo	
	2011 YL_{63}	0.283	1.848	3.413	19.058	0.8467	20.9	Apollo	
	2014 JW_{54}	0.283	2.428	4.573	22.113	0.8833	18.6	Apollo	
385402	2002 WZ_{2}	0.284	2.462	4.640	51.330	0.8846	17.0	Apollo	1.597 ± 0.117 kilometers
	2003 UY_{12}	0.284	0.701	1.118	16.406	0.5945	22.9	Aten	
	2005 WS_{3}	0.285	0.672	1.058	23.069	0.5755	21.2	Aten	
	2008 CC_{6}	0.285	1.261	2.238	9.139	0.7739	22.0	Apollo	
412977	1990 UO	0.285	1.257	2.229	31.556	0.7729	19.5	Apollo	
253106	2002 UR_{3}	0.286	1.379	2.472	48.606	0.7928	16.6	Apollo	
	2018 WL_{2}	0.286	0.884	1.482	34.936	0.6767	21.9	Aten	
397237	2006 KZ_{112}	0.286	2.524	4.762	37.773	0.8868	16.7	Apollo	1.180 ± 0.028 kilometers
	2018 DA_{4}	0.286	1.347	2.408	22.073	0.7878	20.5	Apollo	
382406	1996 AJ_{1}	0.286	1.310	2.333	2.536	0.7815	20.5	Apollo	
	2019 AZ_{2}	0.287	2.459	4.631	7.335	0.8833	21.6	Apollo	
	2016 LW_{9}	0.287	1.130	1.934	11.194	0.7461	22.0	Apollo	
	2017 XR	0.287	0.949	1.612	1.402	0.6976	23.8	Aten	
	2018 NY_{14}	0.287	1.261	2.235	25.176	0.7722	20.2	Apollo	
	2010 XB_{11}	0.288	0.618	0.948	29.887	0.5339	19.9	Atira	
	2015 KR_{157}	0.288	1.087	1.885	18.016	0.7346	21.6	Apollo	
364877	2008 EM_{9}	0.289	1.958	3.628	9.438	0.8524	17.3	Apollo	0.786 ± 0.026 kilometers
	2020 TP_{7}	0.289	1.148	2.007	18.170	0.7479	19.9	Apollo	
	2018 AW	0.290	2.558	4.826	11.874	0.8868	19.5	Apollo	
	2015 TX_{24}	0.290	2.266	4.242	6.043	0.8721	21.5	Apollo	0.252 ± 0.043 kilometers
	2018 ND	0.290	2.068	3.846	26.977	0.8597	20.5	Apollo	
	2008 BP_{16}	0.290	0.829	1.367	29.178	0.6497	21.7	Aten	
538648	2016 FS_{6}	0.290	1.299	2.308	37.179	0.7765	19.4	Apollo	
	2011 EC_{41}	0.291	2.426	4.562	9.885	0.8801	19.9	Apollo	
529718	2010 KY_{129}	0.292	2.490	4.688	60.774	0.8827	17.0	Apollo	1.770 ± 0.287 kilometers
	2013 AO_{27}	0.292	2.411	4.531	4.410	0.8788	19.9	Apollo	
333889	1998 SV_{4}	0.292	0.816	1.341	53.296	0.6420	18.2	Aten	0.919 ± 0.269 kilometers
	2009 WP_{6}	0.292	1.131	1.969	2.777	0.7415	26.8	Apollo	
	2016 EL_{56}	0.292	2.028	3.764	11.355	0.8556	21.1	Apollo	
	2004 WK_{1}	0.293	1.084	1.876	34.470	0.7301	21.0	Apollo	
	2017 JK_{2}	0.293	2.024	3.755	16.799	0.8551	19.9	Apollo	
452639	2005 UY_{6}	0.293	2.257	4.221	12.159	0.8700	18.2	Apollo	2.249 ± 1.084 kilometers
	2015 BY_{512}	0.294	0.878	1.463	23.311	0.6657	21.4	Aten	
452302	1995 YR_{1}	0.294	1.698	3.102	3.570	0.8271	20.4	Apollo	
	2012 DK_{31}	0.294	0.694	1.094	11.172	0.5766	21.8	Aten	
	2015 TB_{145}	0.294	2.101	3.907	38.690	0.8600	20.0	Apollo	
462550	2009 CB_{3}	0.294	1.065	1.835	21.510	0.7236	19.4	Apollo	
	2019 FJ	0.295	0.762	1.229	44.435	0.6129	19.1	Aten	
99907	1989 VA	0.295	0.728	1.162	28.798	0.5947	17.9	Apollo	diameter ~1.4 kilometers
	2009 HU_{44}	0.296	0.830	1.365	6.636	0.6440	22.6	Aten	
	2017 MM8	0.296	0.887	1.478	23.279	0.6667	22.7	Aten	
231937	2001 FO_{32}	0.296	1.701	3.107	38.974	0.8261	17.7	Apollo	
	2014 HE_{124}	0.296	1.960	3.623	18.736	0.8487	22.0	Apollo	
	2016 SG_{2}	0.297	2.473	4.650	24.904	0.8800	20.6	Apollo	0.278 ± 0.088 kilometers
170502	2003 WM_{7}	0.297	2.477	4.657	10.407	0.8801	17.2	Apollo	
	2014 GC_{34}	0.297	1.043	1.788	13.775	0.7150	23.1	Apollo	
162269	1999 VO_{6}	0.297	1.135	1.973	40.111	0.7380	17.0	Apollo	1.010 ± 0.180 kilometers
434326	2004 JG_{6}	0.298	0.635	0.972	18.943	0.5311	18.4	Atira	
	2005 TF_{50}	0.298	2.273	4.248	10.697	0.8687	20.3	Apollo	
	2007 PR_{25}	0.298	1.962	3.626	3.496	0.8479	22.0	Apollo	
162004	1991 VE	0.299	0.891	1.482	7.219	0.6647	18.2	Aten	
	2007 TL_{23}	0.299	1.134	1.970	2.122	0.7365	21.4	Apollo	
141525	2002 FV_{5}	0.299	1.087	1.875	34.031	0.7246	18.0	Apollo	
403775	2011 HS_{4}	0.300	0.938	1.576	5.463	0.6801	21.0	Aten	
	2026 CY_{4}	0.300	2.470	4.630	4.000	0.8800	22.8	Apollo	
138893	2000 YH_{66}	0.301	1.173	2.045	18.345	0.7436	18.1	Apollo	
	2020 UM_{5}	0.301	0.683	1.066	9.218	0.5595	26.0	Apollo	
	2005 XW_{4}	0.301	1.038	1.776	18.254	0.7101	21.4	Apollo	
391151	2005 YY_{93}	0.301	2.580	4.859	24.179	0.8832	17.1	Apollo	1.745 ± 0.061 kilometers
	2019 EM_{1}	0.301	0.671	1.040	28.455	0.5508	22.3	Apollo	
	2013 BM_{76}	0.301	1.564	2.827	17.700	0.8073	20.2	Apollo	
	2013 YK_{70}	0.301	0.948	1.594	23.124	0.6820	20.9	Aten	
	2019 QK	0.302	1.208	2.115	38.248	0.7504	20.9	Apollo	
	2012 XS_{93}	0.302	1.139	1.977	21.866	0.7350	19.8	Apollo	
	2020 QU_{5}	0.302	0.722	1.142	0.767	0.5819	25.6	Aten	
	2009 UT_{19}	0.302	0.890	1.478	9.641	0.6605	22.5	Aten	
533671	Nabu	0.303	2.890	5.477	24.252	0.8952	16.1	Apollo	
	2002 PD_{11}	0.303	2.224	4.145	12.151	0.8638	20.1	Apollo	
	2016 GX_{221}	0.303	2.496	4.688	6.912	0.8786	21.6	Apollo	
	2005 NX_{39}	0.303	2.458	4.613	14.151	0.8767	19.7	Apollo	
163423	2002 FB_{3}	0.303	0.762	1.220	20.278	0.6017	16.5	Aten	1.682 ± 0.013 kilometers
277142	2005 LG_{8}	0.303	1.755	3.207	26.558	0.8272	16.7	Apollo	
	2014 HT_{184}	0.303	1.429	2.554	19.331	0.7876	21.9	Apollo	
	2010 CT	0.304	0.888	1.472	19.759	0.6577	20.1	Aten	
	2006 KZ_{86}	0.304	2.197	4.089	14.294	0.8616	17.9	Apollo	
	2015 PM_{307}	0.304	2.185	4.065	8.038	0.8607	21.7	Apollo	
518737	2009 OO_{9}	0.304	1.624	2.943	13.596	0.8126	18.8	Apollo	
	2011 UX_{192}	0.305	1.489	2.673	55.630	0.7953	18.5	Apollo	
137925	2000 BJ_{19}	0.305	1.292	2.279	31.113	0.7638	15.9	Apollo	1.372 ± 0.068 kilometers
	2003 FY_{6}	0.305	0.730	1.155	6.606	0.5820	22.4	Aten	
	2010 XX_{58}	0.305	2.238	4.172	22.180	0.8636	18.4	Apollo	
388188	2006 DP_{14}	0.306	1.366	2.426	11.777	0.7762	18.9	Apollo	
	2019 BG_{3}	0.307	1.521	2.735	9.415	0.7985	26.1	Apollo	
87684	2000 SY_{2}	0.307	0.859	1.411	19.226	0.6427	16.1	Aten	
	2017 GQ_{5}	0.307	1.249	2.190	37.700	0.7541	20.4	Apollo	
	2010 KC	0.307	0.782	1.257	2.210	0.6071	24.1	Aten	
	2013 LC_{7}	0.307	1.506	2.705	40.189	0.7959	19.4	Apollo	

== Mercury grazers ==
All Mercury grazers have semi-major axes larger than Mercury's (0.3871 AU), and hence are outer grazers, i.e. have perihelia within Mercury's aphelion (0.4667 AU) but not within its perihelion (0.3075 AU). As of February 2016, there are 561 Mercury grazers known. (Values have been rounded to three decimals.)

Designation number	Name	Perihelion (AU)	Semi-major axis (AU)	Aphelion (AU)	Inclination (°)	Eccentricity	Absolute magnitude (H)	Orbit class	Notes
16960	1998 QS_{52}	0.313	2.203	4.093	17.560	0.8577	14.3	Apollo	
85989	1999 JD_{6}	0.324	0.883	1.441	17.054	0.6328	17.1	Aten	
68348	2001 LO_{7}	0.339	2.152	3.964	25.478	0.8426	14.2	Apollo	
86667	2000 FO_{10}	0.348	0.859	1.370	14.286	0.5948	17.4	Aten	
2212	Hephaistos	0.358	2.167	3.975	11.741	0.8348	13.87	Apollo	
66400	1999 LT_{7}	0.366	0.855	1.345	9.065	0.5725	19.3	Aten	
37655	Illapa	0.366	1.478	2.590	17.994	0.7524	17.9	Apollo	
88213	2001 AF_{2}	0.386	0.954	1.522	17.812	0.5952	19.7	Aten	
	2008 UU1	0.401	1.608	2.814	12.057	0.7506	17.6	Apollo	
66146	1998 TU_{3}	0.406	0.787	1.168	5.413	0.4839	14.5	Aten	
24443	2000 OG	0.411	2.310	4.210	25.822	0.8223	16.3	Apollo	
5143	Heracles	0.418	1.834	3.250	9.033	0.7721	13.8	Apollo	
33342	1998 WT_{24}	0.418	0.718	1.019	7.343	0.4180	17.9	Aten	
5660	1974 MA	0.424	1.786	3.147	38.052	0.7623	15.4	Apollo	
322756	2001 CK32	0.448	0.725	1.0003	8.132	0.382	19.2	Aten	Temporary horseshoe librator of Venus
524522	Zoozve	0.427	0.724	1.021	9.006	0.4104	20.5	Aten	Temporary quasi-satellite of Venus
	2012 XE133	0.410	0.723	1.036	6.711	0.433	23.4	Aten	Temporary horseshoe librator of Venus
88254	2001 FM_{129}	0.438	1.182	1.926	1.524	0.6296	17.6	Apollo	
2101	Adonis	0.442	1.875	3.307	1.333	0.7641	18.8	Apollo	
3838	Epona	0.448	1.505	2.561	29.239	0.7020	15.5	Apollo	
87309	2000 QP	0.455	0.847	1.240	34.743	0.4631	17.6	Aten	
2340	Hathor	0.464	0.844	1.224	5.856	0.4498	20.1	Aten	

== See also ==
- List of Venus-crossing minor planets
- List of Earth-crossing minor planets
- List of Mars-crossing minor planets
- List of Jupiter-crossing minor planets
