= (276033) 2002 AJ129 =

Mercury-crossing asteroid

(276033) 2002 AJ_{129}
- The orbit is highly elliptical, moving outside Mars and inside Mercury. Positions shown for 31 January 2018 before flyby.

Discovery
- Discovered by: NEAT
- Discovery site: Haleakala Obs.
- Discovery date: 15 January 2002

Designations
- Minor planet category: Apollo; NEO; PHA; Mercury-crosser; Venus-crosser

Orbital characteristics
- Epoch 4 September 2017 (JD 2458000.5)
- Uncertainty parameter 0
- Observation arc: 14.23 yr (5,199 days)
- Aphelion: 2.6254 AU
- Perihelion: 0.1167 AU
- Semi-major axis: 1.3711 AU
- Eccentricity: 0.9149
- Orbital period (sidereal): 1.61 yr (586 days)
- Mean anomaly: 288.23°
- Mean motion: 0° 36^{m} 50.04^{s} / day
- Inclination: 15.449°
- Longitude of ascending node: 138.05°
- Argument of perihelion: 211.01°
- Earth MOID: 0.0060 AU (2.3 LD)

Physical characteristics
- Mean diameter: 0.5–1.2 km
- Absolute magnitude (H): 18.7

(276033) 2002 AJ_{129} is a Mercury-crossing asteroid. It has the ninth-smallest perihelion of all numbered asteroids, after asteroids such as 2000 BD_{19}, 2004 UL, and 2008 XM. It makes close approaches to all of the inner planets and asteroid 4 Vesta. The asteroid is estimated to be between 0.5–1.2 kilometers (0.3–0.7 mi) across. In January 2018 there was much media hype about this asteroid being classified as a potentially hazardous asteroid, although there is no known threat of an impact for hundreds if not thousands of years. The media has compared the size of the asteroid to the Burj Khalifa in Dubai.

== Description ==
2002 AJ_{129} was discovered on 15 January 2002 by astronomers of the NEAT team at Haleakala Observatory, Hawaii, United States. It was removed from the Sentry Risk Table on 3 February 2002.

It is a Mercury-, Venus-, Earth- and Mars-crossing asteroid. With an observation arc of 14 years, it has a well determined orbit and was last observed in 2016. It is classified as an Apollo asteroid because it is a near-Earth asteroid with a semi-major axis larger than Earth's. It is also categorized as a potentially hazardous asteroid, but that does not mean there is a near-term threat of an impact. It is a potentially hazardous asteroid merely as a result of its size (absolute magnitude H ≤ 22) and Earth minimum orbit intersection distance (Earth MOID ≤ 0.05 AU).

=== 2018 approach ===
On 4 February 2018 at 21:31 UT, the asteroid passed about 0.028126 AU (4,207,600 km; 2,614,500 mi) from Earth. The 2018 Earth approach distance was known with a 3-sigma accuracy of ±200 km. Goldstone is scheduled to observe the asteroid from 3 to 6 February. By 4 February 2018 11:00 UT, the asteroid brightened to apparent magnitude 14 and had a solar elongation of more than 100°.

=== 2172 approach ===
On 8 February 2172, the asteroid will pass about 0.00458 AU (685,000 km; 426,000 mi) from Earth. The 2172 Earth approach distance is known with a 3-sigma accuracy of ±4000 km.

As we look even further into the future the known trajectory becomes more divergent. By the Earth approach of 0.24 AU (36,000,000 km; 22,000,000 mi) on 19 February 2196 the uncertainty increases to ±2.4 million km.

History of close approaches of large near-Earth objects since 1908 ^{(A)}

PHA	Date	Approach distance in lunar distances			Abs. mag (H)	Diameter ^{(C)} (m)	Ref ^{(D)}
PHA	Date	Nominal^{(B)}	Minimum	Maximum	Abs. mag (H)	Diameter ^{(C)} (m)	Ref ^{(D)}
(152680) 1998 KJ9	1914-12-31	0.606	0.604	0.608	19.4	279–900	data
(458732) 2011 MD5	1918-09-17	0.911	0.909	0.913	17.9	556–1795	data
(163132) 2002 CU11	1925-08-30	0.903	0.901	0.905	18.5	443–477	data
69230 Hermes	1937-10-30	1.926	1.926	1.927	17.5	700-900	data
69230 Hermes	1942-04-26	1.651	1.651	1.651	17.5	700-900	data
2017 NM6	1959-07-12	1.89	1.846	1.934	18.8	580–1300	data
(27002) 1998 DV9	1975-01-31	1.762	1.761	1.762	18.1	507–1637	data
2002 NY40	2002-08-18	1.371	1.371	1.371	19.0	335–1082	data
(612901) 2004 XP1414	2006-07-03	1.125	1.125	1.125	19.3	292–942	data
2015 TB145	2015-10-31	1.266	1.266	1.266	20.0	620-690	data
(137108) 1999 AN10	2027-08-07	1.014	1.010	1.019	17.9	556–1793	data
(153814) 2001 WN5	2028-06-26	0.647	0.647	0.647	18.2	921–943	data
99942 Apophis	2029-04-13	0.0981	0.0963	0.1000	19.7	310–340	data
2017 MB1	2072-07-26	1.216	1.215	2.759	18.8	367–1186	data
2011 SM68	2072-10-17	1.875	1.865	1.886	19.6	254–820	data
(163132) 2002 CU_{11}	2080-08-31	1.655	1.654	1.656	18.5	443–477	data
(416801) 1998 MZ	2116-11-26	1.068	1.068	1.069	19.2	305–986	data
(153201) 2000 WO107	2140-12-01	0.634	0.631	0.637	19.3	427–593	data
(276033) 2002 AJ129	2172-02-08	1.783	1.775	1.792	18.7	385–1242	data
(290772) 2005 VC	2198-05-05	1.951	1.791	2.134	17.6	638–2061	data
^{(A)} This list includes near-Earth approaches of less than 2 lunar distances (LD) of objects with H brighter than 20.^{(B)} Nominal geocentric distance from the center of Earth to the center of the object (Earth has a radius of approximately 6,400 km).^{(C)} Diameter: estimated, theoretical mean-diameter based on H and albedo range between X and Y.^{(D)} Reference: data source from the JPL SBDB, with AU converted into LD (1 AU≈390 LD)^{(E)} Color codes: unobserved at close approach observed during close approach upcoming approaches
