= (99907) 1989 VA =

Asteroid and near-Earth object

Discovery
- Discovered by: C. S. Shoemaker; E. M. Shoemaker; D. H. Levy
- Discovery site: Palomar Obs.
- Discovery date: 2 November 1989

Designations
- Minor planet category: NEO · Aten · Mercury-grazer · Venus-crosser · Earth-crosser

Orbital characteristics
- Epoch 4 September 2017 (JD 2458000.5)
- Uncertainty parameter 0
- Observation arc: 26.16 yr (9,555 days)
- Aphelion: 1.1616 AU
- Perihelion: 0.2952 AU
- Semi-major axis: 0.7284 AU
- Eccentricity: 0.5947
- Orbital period (sidereal): 0.62 yr (227 days)
- Mean anomaly: 79.277°
- Mean motion: 1° 35^{m} 7.44^{s} / day
- Inclination: 28.801°
- Longitude of ascending node: 225.60°
- Argument of perihelion: 2.8461°
- Earth MOID: 0.1552 AU · 60.5 LD

Physical characteristics
- Dimensions: 0.547 km (derived); 0.55±0.06 km 1.4 km
- Synodic rotation period: 2.514 h
- Geometric albedo: 0.3718 (derived); 0.40±0.30
- Spectral type: SMASS = Sq · S
- Absolute magnitude (H): 17.9

(99907) 1989 VA is a very eccentric, stony asteroid and near-Earth object, approximately 1 kilometer in diameter. It was discovered on 2 November 1989, by American astronomer couple Carolyn and Eugene Shoemaker and Canadian astronomer David Levy at the Palomar Observatory on Mount Palomar, California.

== Orbit and classification ==
It is a member of the Aten asteroid, a subgroup of near-Earth objects that are located in the zone of influence of Venus. It has frequent, relatively close encounters with the Earth, as its minimum orbit intersection distance (MOID) is 0.16 AU or about 23 million kilometers. It was the eighth Aten asteroid discovered. Since then the number of Atens has grown to about one thousand known bodies.

This asteroid orbits the Sun with a short orbital period at a distance of 0.3–1.2 AU once every 227 days. The body rotates every two and a half hours around its axis and has a notably high albedo of about 0.40. Its orbit is tilted by 29 degrees to the plane of the ecliptic. With an exceptionally high eccentricity of 0.59, it was the most eccentric Aten asteroid known at the time of discovery, more eccentric than previously discovered Aten, 3753 Cruithne. Since then, more eccentric Atens – such as (162004) 1991 VE, with an eccentricity of 0.665 – have been discovered. Due to this elongated orbit, the Aten asteroid and near-Earth asteroid also classifies as Earth-crosser, Venus-crosser and Mercury-grazer.

1989 VA was the first asteroid discovered with such a small semi-major axis (0.728 AU, about the same as Venus), breaking 2100 Ra-Shalom's distance record (0.832 AU), which had held for over a decade. It remained the asteroid with the smallest known semi-major axis for five years until the discovery of 1994 GL (0.683 AU), which was the first asteroid discovered closer to the Sun than Venus.

Being so close to Venus, it is also the first asteroid discovered within Venus' zone of influence. This means that it is close enough to Venus for the planet to capture 1989 VA into a co-orbital relationship. Though it is not a Venus co-orbital at the moment, it may become one in the future and may have been one in the past. Currently, the only known Venus co-orbitals are 2001 CK32, Zoozve and 2012 XE133 (as of 18 March 2013). Of the seven known objects in Venus' zone of influence, 1989 VA is the largest at about 1,400 metres. All of these objects, like 1989 VA, have eccentric orbits that cross Mercury's and Earth's orbits as well.

The combination of a small semi-major axis and high eccentricity made 1989 VA the first Aten asteroid discovered to get closer to the Sun (0.295 AU) than Mercury ever does. 2340 Hathor (the second Aten discovered, in 1976) had the smallest perihelion (0.464 AU) earlier, which was about the same distance as Mercury's aphelion (0.467 AU). It was not until (66063) 1998 RO1 (0.277 AU) was discovered that an Aten asteroid with a lower perihelion was found. 1989 VA's eccentric orbit takes it out past the Earth, where it has encounters of about 0.15 to 0.20 AU about every 3 to 5 years around October–November. It was discovered during its 1989 encounter and was about 0.17 AU away at the time. Further observations were made in October 2002 and during the most recent close encounter in November 2007.

== Physical characteristics ==
In the SMASS taxonomy, 1989 VA is characterized as a Sq-subtype that fall into the broader class of stony S-type asteroids.

== Numbering and naming ==
This minor planet was numbered by the Minor Planet Center on 22 June 2005. As of 2018, it has not been named.
