= List of Venus-crossing minor planets =

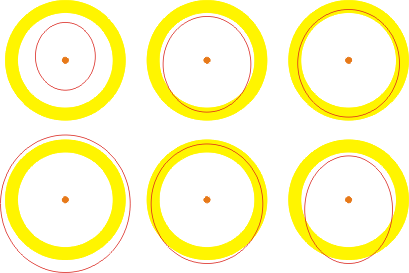
Outer-grazer: middle column, bottom; Crosser: right column, bottom

A Venus-crosser is an asteroid whose orbit crosses that of Venus. There are 2,809 Venus-crosser and 98 outer-grazers known. Mercury-crossers or grazers are marked ‡.

Venus also has a quasi-satellite, 524522 Zoozve. This asteroid is also a Mercury- and Earth-crosser; it seems to have been a "companion" to Venus for the last 7,000 years or so only, and is destined to be ejected from this orbital arrangement about 500 years from now.

== Crossers ==
- 1566 Icarus ‡
- 1862 Apollo
- 1864 Daedalus
- 1865 Cerberus
- 1981 Midas
- 2063 Bacchus
- 2100 Ra-Shalom
- 2101 Adonis ‡
- 2201 Oljato
- 2212 Hephaistos ‡
- 2340 Hathor ‡
- 3200 Phaethon ‡
- 3360 Syrinx
- 3362 Khufu
- 3554 Amun
- 3753 Cruithne
- 3838 Epona ‡
- 4034 Vishnu
- 4197 Morpheus
- 4341 Poseidon
- 4450 Pan
- 4581 Asclepius
- 4769 Castalia
- (4953) 1990 MU
- (5131) 1990 BG
- 5143 Heracles ‡
- 5381 Sekhmet
- (5590) 1990 VA
- (5604) 1992 FE
- (5660) 1974 MA ‡
- (5693) 1993 EA
- 5786 Talos ‡
- (5828) 1991 AM
- (6037) 1988 EG
- 6063 Jason
- 6239 Minos
- (8176) 1991 WA
- (8507) 1991 CB1
- 9162 Kwiila
- (9202) 1993 PB
- (10145) 1994 CK1
- (10165) 1995 BL2
- 11500 Tomaiyowit
- (16816) 1997 UF9
- (16960) 1998 QS52 ‡
- (17182) 1999 VU
- (22753) 1998 WT
- (24443) 2000 OG ‡
- (26379) 1999 HZ1
- (30997) 1995 UO5
- (33342) 1998 WT24 ‡
- (36284) 2000 DM8
- 37655 Illapa ‡
- 38086 Beowulf
- (40267) 1999 GJ4 ‡
- (41429) 2000 GE2
- (52750) 1998 KK17
- (55532) 2001 WG2
- (65679) 1989 UQ
- (65733) 1994 PC
- (65909) 1998 FH12
- (66063) 1998 RO1 ‡
- (66146) 1998 TU3 ‡
- (66253) 1999 GT3 ‡
- 66391 Moshup ‡
- (66400) 1999 LT7 ‡
- (67381) 2000 OL8
- (68347) 2001 KB67
- (68348) 2001 LO7 ‡
- (68950) 2002 QF15
- 69230 Hermes
- (85182) 1991 AQ
- (85713) 1998 SS49
- (85770) 1998 UP1
- (85953) 1999 FK21 ‡
- (85989) 1999 JD6 ‡
- (85990) 1999 JV6
- (86450) 2000 CK33
- (86667) 2000 FO10 ‡
- (86829) 2000 GR146
- (86878) 2000 HD24
- (87025) 2000 JT66
- (87309) 2000 QP ‡
- (87684) 2000 SY2 ‡
- (88213) 2001 AF2 ‡
- (88254) 2001 FM129 ‡
- (89958) 2002 LY45 ‡
- (90367) 2003 LC5
- 136818 Selqet
- 137052 Tjelvar
- 163693 Atira
- 306367 Nut
- (322756) 2001 CK32 ‡
- 326290 Akhenaten
- (374158) 2004 UL ‡
- (386454) 2008 XM ‡
- (394130) 2006 HY51
- 524522 Zoozve ‡
- 2005 HC4 ‡
- 2008 FF5 ‡
- 2012 XE133 ‡
- 2013 ND15 ‡ (first known Venus trojan)

== Grazers ==
- 4183 Cuno
- (8035) 1992 TB
- (31662) 1999 HP11
- (53429) 1999 TF5
- (125281) 2001 VZ14
- (140158) 2001 SX169
- (199801) 2007 AE12
- (225900) 2002 AF3
- (277830) 2006 HR29
- (311044) 2004 BB103
- (352102) 2007 AG12
- (469896) 2005 WC1
- (474238) 2001 RU17
- (525498) 2005 GE60
- 1999 TT16
- 2001 SY169
- 2002 VR85
- 2003 ME1
- 2003 RU11
- 2003 SQ222
- 2004 HZ
- 2004 VZ14
- 2005 NE7
- 2005 VN5
- 2006 BM8
- 2006 CF
- 2006 SC
- 2007 VD12
- 2007 VH189
- 2007 XD10
- 2007 XP
- 2007 YN56
- 2008 CH
- 2008 CY21
- 2008 SV11
- 2008 UB95
- 2008 WA14
- 2008 XB2
- 2009 CE
- 2009 EF3
- 2009 SM98
- 2009 SS
- 2009 UL
- 2010 AL30
- 2010 CN19
- 2010 GO33
- 2010 JO71
- 2010 TS19
- 2010 TW149
- 2010 XB24
- 2010 XJ3
- 2011 AT26
- 2011 CF66
- 2011 EM40
- 2011 FK1
- 2011 KN17
- 2011 OB57
- 2011 UO91
- 2011 WC44
- 2012 AM10
- 2012 DE31
- 2012 FJ15
- 2012 KF47
- 2012 KN11
- 2012 OP4
- 2012 OQ
- 2012 PS4
- 2012 TN20
- 2012 TT256
- 2012 UU68
- 2012 VK5
- 2012 WB25
- 2013 EB34
- 2013 HT150
- 2013 RD6
- 2013 RG
- 2013 TG
- 2013 WR67
- 2013 YB14
- 2014 BP
- 2014 CF13
- 2014 DF23
- 2014 GY44
- 2014 HH196
- 2014 UR114
- 2014 UZ191
- 2015 BV515
- 2015 HE1
- 2015 HY182
- 2015 TM237
- 2015 TN21
- 2015 TU237
- 2015 XK55
- 2015 XT378
- 2015 YA
- 2016 AN2
- 2016 BW14
- 2016 EG86
- 2016 EU155
- 2016 FD1

== See also ==
- List of Mercury-crossing minor planets
- List of Earth-crossing minor planets
- List of Mars-crossing minor planets
- List of Jupiter-crossing minor planets
