= 1862 Apollo =

Stony near-Earth asteroid

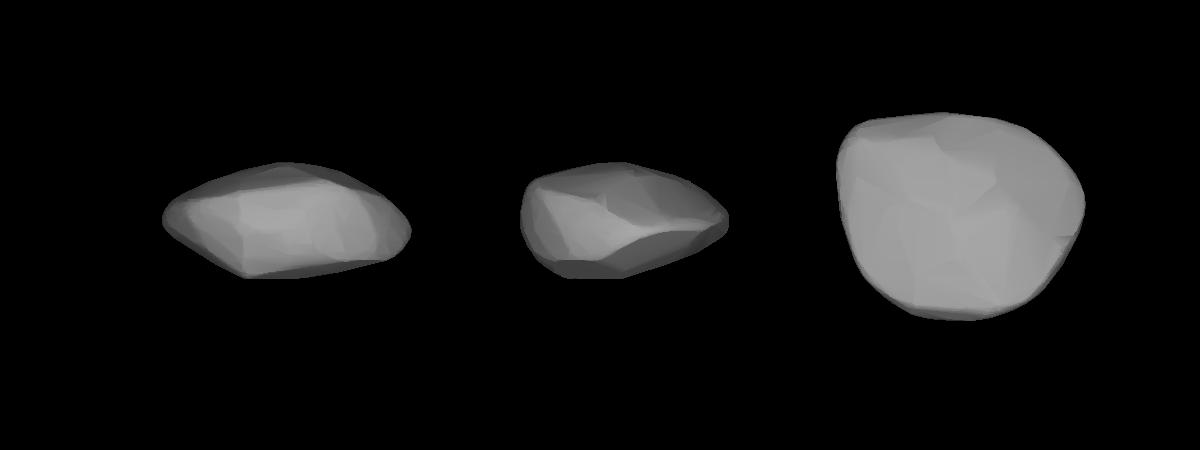
- A three-dimensional model of 1862 Apollo based on its light-curve

Discovery
- Discovered by: K. Reinmuth
- Discovery site: Heidelberg Obs.
- Discovery date: 24 April 1932

Designations
- Pronunciation: /əˈpɒloʊ/
- Named after: Apollo (Greek mythology)
- Alternative designations: 1932 HA 24px (astrological)
- Minor planet category: NEO · PHA; Venus-crosser; Mars-crosser; Apollo asteroids

Orbital characteristics
- Epoch 21 November 2025 (JD 2461000.5)
- Uncertainty parameter 0
- Observation arc: 95.27 yr (34796 days)
- Earliest precovery date: 24 April 1932
- Aphelion: 2.2945 AU (343.25 Gm)
- Perihelion: 0.64733 AU (96.839 Gm)
- Semi-major axis: 1.4709 AU (220.04 Gm)
- Eccentricity: 0.55992
- Orbital period (sidereal): 1.7840 yr (651.60 d)
- Mean anomaly: 113.88°
- Mean motion: 0° 33^{m} 8.928^{s} / day
- Inclination: 6.3514°
- Longitude of ascending node: 35.542°
- Argument of perihelion: 286.05°
- Earth MOID: 0.0260113 AU (10.1228 LD; 3.89124 Gm)
- Jupiter MOID: 3.05801 AU (457.472 Gm)
- T_{Jupiter}: 4.413

Physical characteristics
- Dimensions: 1.5 km (0.93 mi)
- Mean radius: 0.75 km
- Synodic rotation period: 3.065 h (0.1277 d)
- Geometric albedo: 0.25
Surface temp.	min	mean	max
Kelvin	171 K	214 K	322 K
Celsius	−102 °C	−59 °C	49 °C
Fahrenheit	−151.6 °F	−74.2 °F	120.2 °F
- Spectral type: Q (Tholen, SMASS); B–V = 0.819; U–B = 0.481
- Absolute magnitude (H): 16.09

1862 Apollo /əˈpɒloʊ/ is a stony asteroid, approximately 1.5 kilometers in diameter, classified as a near-Earth object (NEO). It was discovered by German astronomer Karl Reinmuth at Heidelberg Observatory on 24 April 1932, but was lost and not recovered until 1973.

It is the namesake and the first recognized member of the Apollo asteroids, a subgroup of NEOs which are Earth-crossers, that is, they cross the orbit of the Earth when viewed perpendicularly to the ecliptic plane (crossing an orbit is a more general term than actually intersecting it). In addition, since Apollo's orbit is highly eccentric, it crosses the orbits of Venus and Mars and is therefore called a Venus-crosser and Mars-crosser as well.

Although Apollo was the first Apollo asteroid to be discovered, its official IAU-number (1862) is higher than that of some other Apollo asteroids such as 1566 Icarus, because it was a lost asteroid for more than 40 years and other bodies were numbered in the meantime. The analysis of its rotation provided observational evidence of the YORP effect.

It is named after the Greek god Apollo, god of prophecy, music, healing and light, child of Zeus and Leto, after which the minor planets 5731 Zeus and 68 Leto are respectively named.

== Satellite ==
On 4 November 2005, it was announced that an asteroid moon, or satellite of Apollo, had been detected by radar observations from Arecibo Observatory, Puerto Rico, on 19 October – 2 November 2005. The announcement is contained in the International Astronomical Union Circular (IAUC) 8627. The satellite is only 80 m (260 ft) across and orbits Apollo just 3 km (1.9 mi) away from the asteroid itself. From the surface of Apollo, the satellite would have an angular diameter of about 2.1 degrees. (Note: Calculated from the formula $\delta$ = (206265) d / D arcseconds. (see Angular diameter))

== Potentially hazardous object ==
1862 Apollo is a potentially hazardous asteroid (PHA) because its minimum orbit intersection distance (MOID) is less than 0.05 AU and its diameter is greater than 150 meters. Apollo's Earth MOID is 0.0257 AU (3,840,000 km; 2,390,000 mi). Its orbit is well-determined for the next several hundred years. On 17 May 2075 it will pass 0.0083 AU (1,240,000 km; 770,000 mi) from Venus.

== See also ==
- Lost asteroid
