= 1566 Icarus =

Asteroid

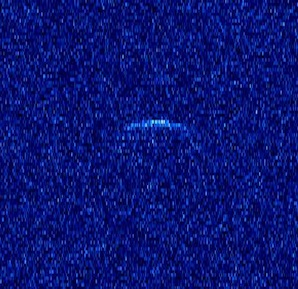
- Radar image of Icarus taken by the Goldstone Observatory in June 2015

Discovery
- Discovered by: W. Baade
- Discovery site: Palomar Obs.
- Discovery date: 27 June 1949

Designations
- Pronunciation: /ˈɪkərəs/
- Named after: Icarus (Greek mythology)
- Alternative designations: 1949 MA
- Minor planet category: NEO; Apollo; PHA; Mercury-crosser; Venus-crosser; Mars-crosser
- Adjectives: Icarian /aɪˈkɛəriən/
- Symbol: (astrological)

Orbital characteristics
- Epoch 1 July 2021 (JD 2459396.5)
- Uncertainty parameter 0
- Observation arc: 72.11 yr (26,339 d)
- Aphelion: 1.9697 AU
- Perihelion: 0.1865 AU
- Semi-major axis: 1.0781 AU
- Eccentricity: 0.8270
- Orbital period (sidereal): 1.12 yr (409 d)
- Mean anomaly: 180.73°
- Mean motion: 0° 52^{m} 49.8^{s} / day
- Inclination: 22.812°
- Longitude of ascending node: 87.981°
- Argument of perihelion: 31.419°
- Earth MOID: 0.0341 AU (13.3 LD)

Physical characteristics
- Dimensions: 1.61 km × 1.60 km × 1.17 km
- Mean diameter: 1.0 km (Note: Hazards due to Comets and Asteroids (1994), Ed. T. Gehrels, pp. 540–543 at JPL's SBDB); 1.03±0.04 km; 1.27 km; 1.417±0.123 km; 1.44±0.26 km
- Synodic rotation period: 2.268 h; 2.27±0.05 h; 2.2726±0.0003 h; 2.273 h; 2.27364 h; 2.2794±0.0005 h
- Geometric albedo: 0.14; 0.14±0.10; 0.199±0.110; 0.29±0.05; 0.33; 0.40; 0.51
- Spectral type: S; S/Q; B–V = 0.774; U–B = 0.520
- Absolute magnitude (H): 16.35

1566 Icarus (/ˈɪkərəs/ IK-ə-rəs; provisional designation: 1949 MA) is a large near-Earth object of the Apollo group of Earth-crossing asteroids, and the lowest-numbered potentially hazardous asteroid. It has an extremely eccentric orbit (0.83) and measures approximately 1.4 km (0.87 mi) in diameter. In 1968, it became the first asteroid ever observed by radar. Its orbit brings it closer to the Sun than Mercury and further out than the orbit of Mars, which also makes it a Mercury-, Venus-, and Mars-crossing asteroid. This stony asteroid and relatively fast rotator with a period of 2.27 hours was discovered on 27 June 1949, by German astronomer Walter Baade at the Palomar Observatory in California. It was named after the mythological Icarus.

== Orbit and classification ==
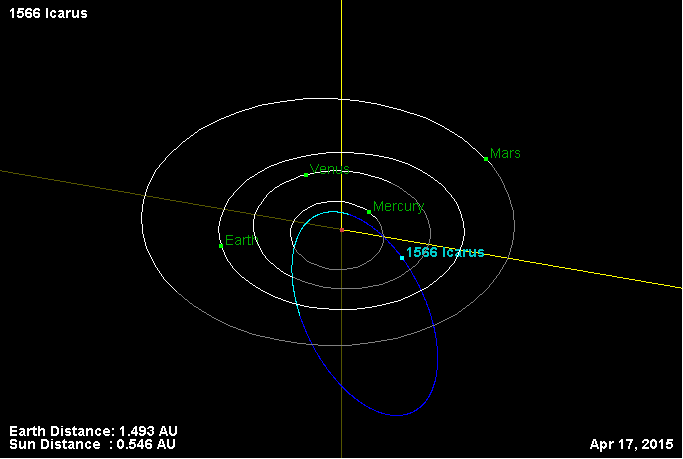
Orbital diagram of Icarus

Icarus orbits the Sun at a distance of 0.19–1.97 AU once every 13 months (409 days; semi-major axis of 1.08 AU). Its orbit has an eccentricity of 0.83 and an inclination of 23° with respect to the ecliptic. The body's observation arc begins with its official discovery observation at Palomar in 1949.

At perihelion, Icarus comes closer to the Sun than Mercury, i.e. it is a Mercury-crossing asteroid. It is also a Venus and Mars-crosser. From 1949 until the discovery of 3200 Phaethon in 1983, it was known as the asteroid that passed closest to the Sun. Since then hundreds of Mercury-crossers have been found, the closest ones now being 2005 HC4 and (394130) 2006 HY51 (also see List of Mercury-crossing minor planets § List).

=== Meteor shower ===
Icarus is thought to be the source of the Arietids, a strong daylight meteor shower. However other objects such as the short-period Sun-grazing comet 96P/Machholz are also possible candidates for the shower's origin.

=== Close approaches ===
Icarus has an Earth minimum orbital intersection distance (MOID) of 0.0352 AU (5,270,000 km), which translates into 13.7 lunar distances (LD). This near-Earth object and potentially hazardous asteroid makes close approaches to Earth in June at intervals of 9, 19, or 28 years.

On 14 June 1968, it came as close as 0.042482 AU (6,355,200 km; 16.533 LD). During this approach, Icarus became the first minor planet to be observed using radar, with measurements obtained at the Haystack Observatory and the Goldstone Tracking Station.

The last close approach was on 16 June 2015, when Icarus passed Earth at 0.05383 AU (8,053,000 km; 20.95 LD). Before that, the previous close approach was on 11 June 1996, at 0.10119 AU (15,138,000 km), almost 40 times as far as the Moon. The next notably close approach will be on 13 June 2043, at 0.0586 AU (8,770,000 km) from Earth.

== Naming ==
This minor planet was named after Icarus, son of Daedalus (also see 1864 Daedalus) from Greek mythology. They attempted to escape prison by means of wings constructed from feathers and wax. Icarus ignored his father's instructions not to fly too close to the Sun. When the wax in his wings melted he fell into the sea and drowned. The naming was suggested by R. C. Cameron and Dr. Folkman. The official naming citation was published by the Minor Planet Center in January 1950 (M.P.C. 347). Both mythological figures are honored with the lunar craters Icarus and Daedalus.

== Physical characteristics ==
Radiometric observation characterized Icarus as a stony S-type and Q-type asteroid.

=== Rotation period ===
Since 1968, several rotational lightcurves of Icarus were obtained from photometric and radiometric observations. During the asteroid's close approach in June 2017, observations of the fast-moving object were taken by Italian astronomers Virginio Oldani and Federico Manzini, Brian Warner at the Palmer Divide Station (U82) in California, and by Australian astronomers at the Darling Range and Blue Mountains Observatories (Q68). (Note: Lightcurve plot of (1566) Icarus by Brian Warner at CS3-PDS (2015). Summary figures at the LCDB)

Lightcurve analysis gave it a consolidated rotation period of 2.2726 hours with a brightness variation of 0.22 magnitude (U=3). Icarus is a relatively fast rotator, near the threshold where non-solid rubble piles fly apart.

=== Spin axis ===
Analysis of 2015 radar observations obtained at the Arecibo Observatory and the Goldstone Observatory yields a spin axis of (270.0°, −81.0°) in ecliptic coordinates (λ, β).

=== Diameter and albedo ===
According to several radiometric, photometric, and radar observations, including the survey carried out by the NEOWISE mission of NASA's Wide-field Infrared Survey Explorer, Icarus measures between 1.0 and 1.44 kilometers in diameter and its surface has an albedo between 0.14 and 0.51.

Analysis of the radar data obtained at the Arecibo and Goldstone observatories in June 2015 gives the body's dimensions: 1.61 × 1.60 × 1.17 kilometers, with equivalent diameter of 1.44 kilometers. The Collaborative Asteroid Lightcurve Link adopts an albedo of 0.14 based on the radar-derived equivalent diameter of 1.44 kilometers and absolute magnitude of 16.96.

== Research interests ==
Icarus is being studied to better understand general relativity, solar oblateness, and Yarkovsky drift. In its case, the perihelion precession caused by general relativity is 10.05 arcseconds per Julian century.

== Project Icarus ==
"Project Icarus" was a student project conducted at the Massachusetts Institute of Technology (MIT) in the spring of 1967 as a contingency plan in case of an impending collision with 1566 Icarus.

This project was an assignment by Paul Sandorff for his group of MIT systems engineering graduate students to devise a plan to use rockets to deflect or destroy Icarus in the case that it was found to be on a collision course with planet Earth. Time magazine ran an article on the endeavor in June 1967 and the following year the student report was published as a book.

The students' plan relied on the new Saturn V rocket, which did not make its first flight until after the report had been completed. During the course of their study, the students visited the Kennedy Space Center, Florida, where they were so impressed with the Vehicle Assembly Building that they wrote of "the awesome reality" that had "completely erased" their doubts over using the technology associated with the Apollo program and Saturn rockets.

The final plan hypothesized that six Saturn V rockets (appropriated from the then-current Apollo program) would be used, each launched at variable intervals from months to hours away from impact. Each rocket was to be fitted with a single 100-megaton nuclear warhead (based on a theoretical design) as well as a modified Apollo Service Module and uncrewed Apollo Command Module for guidance to the target. The warheads would be detonated 30 meters from the surface, deflecting or partially destroying the asteroid. Depending on the subsequent impacts on the course or the destruction of the asteroid, later missions would be modified or cancelled as needed. The "last-ditch" launch of the sixth rocket would be 18 hours prior to impact.

== In fiction ==
The Project Icarus report later served as the basis and inspiration for the 1979 science fiction film Meteor.

"Summertime on Icarus" is a science fiction short story by British writer Arthur C. Clarke.
