= 2019 TA7 =

Near-Earth asteroid

2019 TA_{7}
Discovery
- Discovered by: MLS
- Discovery site: Mount Lemon Obs.
- Discovery date: 9 October 2019 (first observed only)

Designations
- Minor planet category: NEO · Aten

Orbital characteristics
- Epoch 27 April 2019 (JD 2458600.5)
- Uncertainty parameter 7 · 8
- Observation arc: 4 days
- Aphelion: 1.0991 AU
- Perihelion: 0.4140 AU
- Semi-major axis: 0.7566 AU
- Eccentricity: 0.4528
- Orbital period (sidereal): 240 days
- Mean anomaly: 347.90°
- Mean motion: 1° 29^{m} 52.08^{s} / day
- Inclination: 4.1480°
- Longitude of ascending node: 13.589°
- Argument of perihelion: 158.80°
- Earth MOID: 0.0093 AU (3.6 LD)

Physical characteristics
- Mean diameter: 34 m (111 ft)
- Apparent magnitude: 19.1 (brightest)
- Absolute magnitude (H): 26.29; 26.3

2019 TA_{7} is an Aten (NEO) asteroid, estimated to be about 34 meters (111 feet) in diameter, that was first observed on 9 October 2019, and flew pass the Earth at 38,100 km/h (23,700 mph), about 0.01 AU (1,500,000 km; 930,000 mi) away, its closest encounter in 115 years, on 14 October 2019 at 6:53 pm ET.

== Trajectory ==
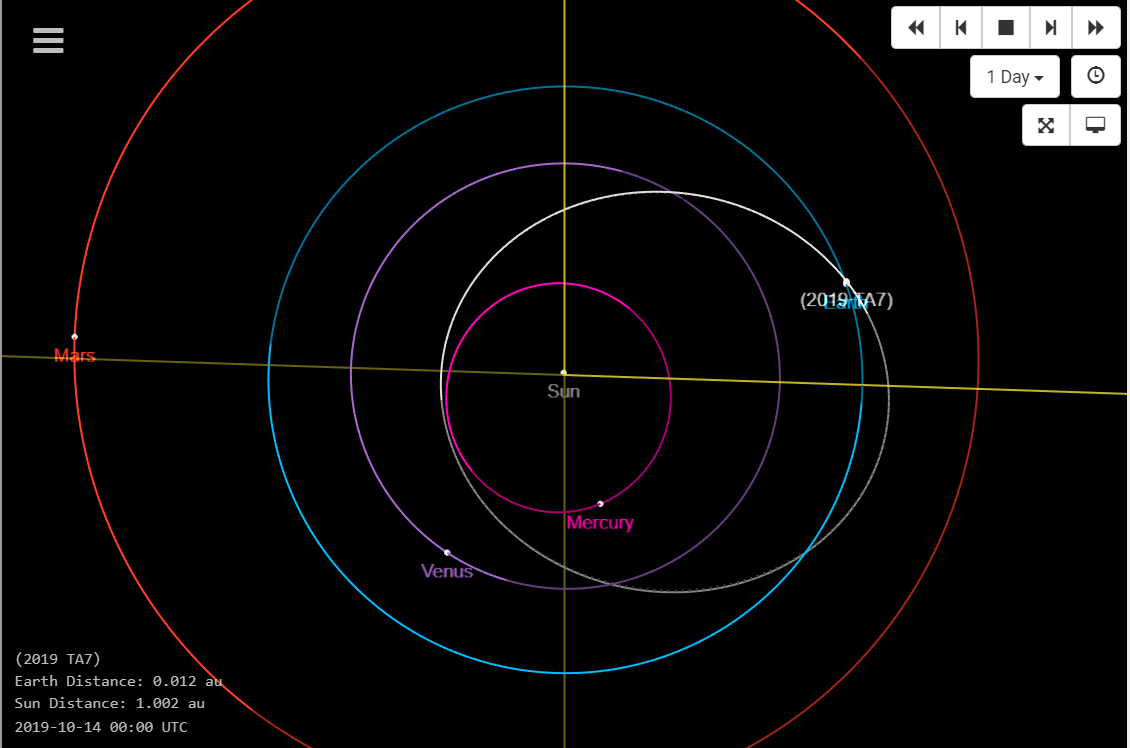
2019 TA7 asteroid trajectory – as/of 14 October 2019 (Asteroid orbit is in white; Earth orbit is in blue)

== See also ==
- Chelyabinsk meteor
