= (7025) 1993 QA =

Sub-kilometer asteroid classified as a near-Earth object

Discovery
- Discovered by: Spacewatch
- Discovery site: Kitt Peak National Obs.
- Discovery date: 16 August 1993

Designations
- Minor planet category: NEO · Apollo · Amor

Orbital characteristics
- Epoch 4 September 2017 (JD 2458000.5)
- Uncertainty parameter 0
- Observation arc: 22.88 yr (8,358 days)
- Aphelion: 1.9405 AU
- Perihelion: 1.0111 AU
- Semi-major axis: 1.4758 AU
- Eccentricity: 0.3149
- Orbital period (sidereal): 1.79 yr (655 days)
- Mean anomaly: 25.431°
- Mean motion: 0° 32^{m} 59.28^{s} / day
- Inclination: 12.607°
- Longitude of ascending node: 146.64°
- Argument of perihelion: 323.39°
- Earth MOID: 0.0645 AU · 25.1 LD

Physical characteristics
- Dimensions: 0.498±0.171 km 0.77 km (derived)
- Synodic rotation period: 2.5057 h
- Geometric albedo: 0.20 (assumed); 0.340±0.234
- Spectral type: D · S
- Absolute magnitude (H): 17.94 · 18.00 · 18.3 · 18.75±0.47

(7025) 1993 QA is a sub-kilometer asteroid classified as a near-Earth object of the Apollo and Amor group, respectively. It was discovered on 16 August 1993, by astronomers of the Spacewatch program at the Kitt Peak National Observatory near Tucson, Arizona, United States. The asteroid measures approximately half a kilometer in diameter and has a short rotation period of 2.5057 hours.

== Orbit and classification ==
1993 QA is a member of the dynamical Apollo group, which are Earth-crossing asteroids. Conversely, it is classified as a non-Earth crossing Amor asteroid by the Minor Planet Center, due to its near-threshold perihelion of 1.011 AU.

It orbits the Sun at a distance of 1.01–1.94 AU once every 21 months (655 days; semi-major axis of 1.48 AU). Its orbit has an eccentricity of 0.31 and an inclination of 13° with respect to the ecliptic. The body's observation arc begins with its official discovery observation by Spacewatch on 16 August 1993.

=== Close approaches ===
The asteroid has an Earth minimum orbital intersection distance of 0.0645 AU (9,650,000 km), which translates into 25.1 lunar distances. On 6 February 1996 it transited Earth at a nominal distance of 10,600,000 km; 6,580,000 mi (0.07080 AU). The body's next encounter with Earth below 0.1 AU will occur on 24 January 2025, at a distance of 9,390,000 km; 5,830,000 mi (0.06275 AU).

== Physical characteristics ==
1993 QA has been characterized as a dark D-type asteroid on images taken by the Sloan Digital Sky Survey. Conversely, Pan-STARRS' photometric survey determined a much brighter S-type.

=== Rotation period ===
In the late 1990s, two rotational lightcurves of 1993 QA were obtained from photometric observations by European astronomers. Lightcurve analysis gave an identical, well-defined rotation period of 2.5057 hours with a brightness amplitude of 0.32 and 0.50 magnitude, respectively (U=3/3). Its period is near the cohesionless spin-barrier of 2.2 hours, which set the upper limit for fast-rotating asteroids.

=== Diameter and albedo ===
According to the survey carried out by the NEOWISE mission of NASA's Wide-field Infrared Survey Explorer, 1993 QA measures 498 meters in diameter and its surface has a high albedo of 0.340. The Collaborative Asteroid Lightcurve Link assumes a standard albedo for stony asteroids of 0.20 and derives a diameter of 770 meters based on an absolute magnitude of 17.94.

== Naming ==
As of 2018, this minor planet has not been named yet.
