= (386454) 2008 XM =

Eccentric near-Earth asteroid

Discovery
- Discovered by: LINEAR
- Discovery site: Lincoln Lab's ETS
- Discovery date: 2 December 2008

Designations
- Minor planet category: Apollo · NEO · PHA

Orbital characteristics
- Epoch 4 September 2017 (JD 2458000.5)
- Uncertainty parameter 0
- Observation arc: 5.16 yr (1,884 days)
- Aphelion: 2.3334 AU
- Perihelion: 0.1111 AU
- Semi-major axis: 1.2222 AU
- Eccentricity: 0.9091
- Orbital period (sidereal): 1.35 yr (494 days)
- Mean anomaly: 204.67°
- Mean motion: 0° 43^{m} 45.84^{s} / day
- Inclination: 5.4478°
- Longitude of ascending node: 240.63°
- Argument of perihelion: 27.357°
- Earth MOID: 0.0048 AU · 1.9 LD

Physical characteristics
- Mean diameter: 0.367±0.009 km
- Geometric albedo: 0.128±0.032
- Absolute magnitude (H): 20.0

(386454) 2008 XM is a highly eccentric, sub-kilometer-sized asteroid, with one of the smallest known perihelions among all minor planets. It is classified as a near-Earth object of the Apollo group and was discovered on 2 December 2008, by the LINEAR program at Lincoln Laboratory's Experimental Test Site in Socorro, New Mexico, United States.

== Orbit and classification ==
The asteroid orbits the Sun at a distance of 0.1–2.3 AU once every 16 months (494 days). Its orbit has an eccentricity of 0.91 and an inclination of 5° with respect to the ecliptic. Due to its outstanding eccentricity, it is also a Mercury-crosser, Venus-crosser and Mars-crosser.

It has the third-smallest perihelion of any numbered asteroid behind (137924) 2000 BD19 and (374158) 2004 UL. Its Earth minimum orbital intersection distance of 0.0047 AU (700,000 km) corresponds to only 1.9 lunar distances.

== Physical characteristics ==
According to the survey carried out by the NEOWISE mission of NASA's Wide-field Infrared Survey Explorer, the asteroid measures 367±9 meters in diameter and its surface has an albedo of 0.128. As of 2016, the body's composition and spectral type, as well as its rotation period and shape remains unknown.

== Naming ==
As of 2020, this minor planet remains unnamed.
