= (137924) 2000 BD19 =

Asteroid

(137924) 2000 BD_{19}
Discovery
- Discovered by: LINEAR
- Discovery date: 26 January 2000

Designations
- Minor planet category: NEO; Aten; Mercury crosser; Venus crosser; Earth crosser; Mars grazer

Orbital characteristics
- Epoch 13 January 2016 (JD 2457400.5)
- Uncertainty parameter 0
- Observation arc: 6960 days (19.06 yr)
- Aphelion: 1.66093678 AU (248.472606 Gm)
- Perihelion: 0.092057468 AU (13.7716012 Gm)
- Semi-major axis: 0.876497123 AU (131.1221033 Gm)
- Eccentricity: 0.8949712
- Orbital period (sidereal): 0.82 yr (299.7 d)
- Mean anomaly: 328.94867°
- Mean motion: 1.2010977°/day
- Inclination: 25.716450°
- Longitude of ascending node: 333.73148°
- Argument of perihelion: 324.31756°
- Earth MOID: 0.0904402 AU (13.52966 Gm)

Physical characteristics
- Mean diameter: 0.97 km
- Synodic rotation period: 10.570 h (0.4404 d)
- Geometric albedo: 0.247
- Spectral type: V
- Absolute magnitude (H): 17.2

(137924) 2000 BD_{19} is a 970-meter asteroid and near-Earth object with the second smallest perihelion of any numbered asteroid (0.092 AU—38% of Mercury's orbital radius). With its high eccentricity, not only does 2000 BD_{19} get very close to the Sun, but it also travels relatively far away from it. It has the third largest aphelion of any numbered Aten asteroid and is one of a small group of Aten asteroids that is also a Mars grazer. Its orbital elements indicate that it may be an extinct comet, but it has not been seen displaying cometary activity so far.

2000 BD_{19} was discovered by LINEAR in January 2000 and was soon after located by DANEOPS on Palomar plates from 10 February 1997. This allowed a reasonably precise orbit determination, and as a result it was spotted again on 27 February 2001 and 21 January 2002. When it was discovered, it beat 1995 CR's record for both asteroid with the smallest perihelion and for Aten asteroid with the highest eccentricity.

It is estimated that 2000 BD_{19}'s surface temperature reaches ~920 K at perihelion, enough to melt lead and zinc, and nearly enough to melt aluminium. The asteroid would be hot enough to incandesce red being above the Draper Point at closest approach. 2000 BD_{19} is considered a good candidate for measuring the effects of Albert Einstein's general theory of relativity because of how close it comes to the Sun.

2000 BD_{19} shares noticeable orbit similarities with two other low-perihelion asteroids: (425755) 2011 CP_{4} and 1995 CR, their longitude of perihelion differing by only 9.9 and 7.1 degrees, respectively. Combined with their similar semimajor axis (average distance from the Sun) of 0.877, 0.911, and 0.907 astronomical units respectively, they could possibly be fragments of 2000 BD_{19} that separated from it in the past.
