= 2008 FF5 =

Asteroid

Discovery
- Discovered by: Mt. Lemmon Survey (G96); 1.5-m reflector
- Discovery date: 28 March 2008

Designations
- Minor planet category: Mercury crosser; Venus crosser; Apollo Asteroid; Earth crosser; Mars crosser

Orbital characteristics
- Epoch 1 April 2008 (JD 2454557.5)
- Uncertainty parameter 9
- Aphelion: 4.49421629 AU (672.325187 Gm)
- Perihelion: 0.079138425 AU (11.8389399 Gm)
- Semi-major axis: 2.28667736 AU (342.082064 Gm)
- Eccentricity: 0.96539152
- Orbital period (sidereal): 3.46 yr (1263.0 d)
- Mean anomaly: 12.042691°
- Mean motion: 0° 17^{m} 6.123^{s} / day
- Inclination: 2.6285675°
- Longitude of ascending node: 15.296731°
- Argument of perihelion: 19.899259°
- Earth MOID: 0.00725225 AU (1,084,921 km)
- Jupiter MOID: 0.964477 AU (144.2837 Gm)

Physical characteristics
- Dimensions: 70–160 m
- Absolute magnitude (H): 23.1

2008 FF_{5} is the asteroid with the second-smallest known perihelion of any known object orbiting the Sun. Its extreme orbital eccentricity brings it within 0.079 AU of the Sun (26% of Mercury's perihelion) and as far as 4.487 AU from the Sun (well beyond the orbit of Mars).
