= 4450 Pan =

Asteroid

Discovery
- Discovered by: C. S. Shoemaker; E. M. Shoemaker
- Discovery site: Palomar Obs.
- Discovery date: 25 September 1987

Designations
- Pronunciation: /ˈpæn/
- Named after: Pan (Greek deity)
- Alternative designations: 1987 SY · 1937 CA
- Minor planet category: NEO · Apollo · PHA

Orbital characteristics
- Epoch 4 September 2017 (JD 2458000.5)
- Uncertainty parameter 0
- Observation arc: 78.85 yr (28,799 days)
- Earliest precovery date: 6 February 1937
- Aphelion: 2.2884 AU
- Perihelion: 0.5962 AU
- Semi-major axis: 1.4423 AU
- Eccentricity: 0.5866
- Orbital period (sidereal): 1.73 yr (633 days)
- Mean anomaly: 152.71°
- Mean motion: 0° 34^{m} 8.4^{s} / day
- Inclination: 5.5196°
- Longitude of ascending node: 311.84°
- Argument of perihelion: 291.79°
- Earth MOID: 0.0287 AU · 11.2 LD

Physical characteristics
- Mean diameter: 1.0±0.2 km 1.13 km (calculated)
- Synodic rotation period: 3.51±0.02 h 56.48±0.02 h 60±12 h (Note: Pravec (2008) web: rotation period 60±12 hours with a brightness amplitude of 0.6 mag. Summary figures for (4450) Pan at Collaborative Asteroid Lightcurve Link (CALL))
- Geometric albedo: 0.20 (assumed)
- Spectral type: S
- Absolute magnitude (H): 17.1 · 17.43±0.07

4450 Pan (prov. designation: 1987 SY) is a highly eccentric asteroid and contact binary, classified as a potentially hazardous asteroid and near-Earth object of the Apollo group, approximately 1.1 kilometers in diameter. It was discovered on 25 September 1987, by American astronomers Eugene and Carolyn Shoemaker at Palomar Observatory in California, United States. It was named after Pan from Greek mythology.

== Naming ==
This minor planet was named after Pan, the Greek god of nature, shepherds of flocks and wild animals. In art, he was represented as a horned half-man, half goat. Pan was worshiped by the citizens of Athens, after he had inspired panic in the hearts of their Persians enemies in the Battle of Marathon (also see 4356 Marathon). The modern word "panic" origins from this myth. The name Pan has also been given to Saturn XVIII, one of the moons of Saturn. The official naming citation was published by the Minor Planet Center on 30 January 1991 (M.P.C. 17657).

== Orbit and classification ==
Pan orbits the Sun in the inner main-belt at a distance of 0.6–2.3 AU once every 1 year and 9 months (633 days). Its orbit has an eccentricity of 0.59 and an inclination of 6° with respect to the ecliptic.

As an Apollo asteroid, it is an Earth-crosser and has a minimum orbit intersection distance with Earth of 0.0287 AU (4,290,000 km), which corresponds to 11.2 lunar distances. Due to its extremely eccentric orbit, it is also a Venus- and Mars-crosser and approaches Mercury within 20 million km.

It was first observed as 1937 CA at Heidelberg Observatory in 1937. The body's observation arc begins at Palomar with its official discovery observation.

== Physical characteristics ==
Pan is an assumed stony S-type asteroid.

=== Contact binary ===
Pan is a contact binary, composed of two lobes in mutual contact, held together only by their weak gravitational attraction, and typically show a dumbbell-like shape (also see 4769 Castalia). A large number of near-Earth objects are thought to be contact binaries.

=== Diameter and albedo ===
The Collaborative Asteroid Lightcurve Link assumes a standard albedo for stony asteroids of 0.20 and calculates a diameter of 1.1 kilometers, while photometric observations by Italian Albino Carbognani at Saint-Barthelemy Observatory (B04) gave a diameter of 1.0±0.2 kilometers.

=== Rotation period ===
In September 2013, a rotational lightcurve of Pan was obtained from photometric observations by American astronomer Brian Warner at his Palmer Divide Station (716) in Colorado. It gave a long rotation period of 56.48±0.02 hours with a brightness variation of 0.64 in magnitude (U=3).

The results supersedes two previous observations by Petr Pravec and Silvano Casulli that gave a period of 60±12 and 3.51±0.02 hours, respectively (U=2/1).
