= (8035) 1992 TB =

Near-Earth asteroid

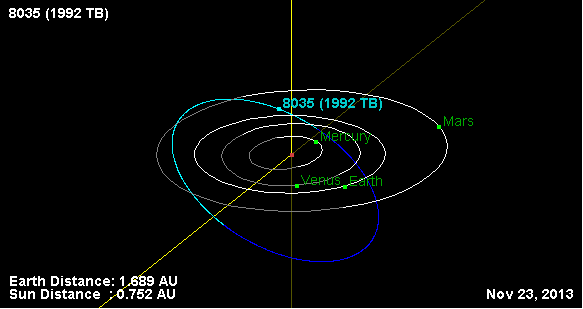
- Orbit of (8035) 1992 TB

Discovery
- Discovered by: Spacewatch
- Discovery site: Kitt Peak Observatory
- Discovery date: 2 October 1992

Orbital characteristics
- Epoch 13 January 2016 (JD 2457400.5)
- Uncertainty parameter 0
- Observation arc: 8363 days (22.90 yr)
- Aphelion: 1.9625 AU (293.59 Gm)
- Perihelion: 0.72149 AU (107.933 Gm)
- Semi-major axis: 1.3420 AU (200.76 Gm)
- Eccentricity: 0.46238
- Orbital period (sidereal): 1.55 yr (567.83 d)
- Mean anomaly: 145.13°
- Mean motion: 0° 38^{m} 2.364^{s} / day
- Inclination: 28.308°
- Longitude of ascending node: 185.64°
- Argument of perihelion: 6.0430°
- Earth MOID: 0.273002 AU (40.8405 Gm)
- Jupiter MOID: 2.99532 AU (448.093 Gm)

Proper orbital elements
- Proper eccentricity: 0.5068
- Proper inclination: 24.45°
- Proper mean motion: 231.32 deg / yr
- Proper orbital period: 1.55629 yr (568.433 d)

Physical characteristics
- Dimensions: 1.673 km (1.040 mi). (Note: Assuming an albedo of 0.1)
- Absolute magnitude (H): 17.1

(8035) 1992 TB is an Apollo asteroid, a type of near-Earth object. It is also a Venus-crosser and a Mars-crosser, although it doesn't make close approaches to Mars.

== Encounters with Venus and Earth ==
1992 TB makes close approaches to Earth, but often comes many times closer to Venus. Soon after the discovery of the asteroid in 1992, a close approaches of Earth was made. Three years after it was discovered, 1992 TB came 45,720,000 km (0.3056 AU) from Earth. In 2003, 1992 TB was listed as a potentially hazardous object, but has since been removed. However, 1992 TB is not expected to come within 37,000,000 km (0.25 AU) of Earth in the near future. On the other hand, 1992 TB can come much closer to Venus. Its next Venus encounter was on 29 May 2015, where it came 11,710,000 km (0.0783 AU) from the planet. Its closest approach in the near future will be 7,380,000 km (0.0493 AU).
