= (16960) 1998 QS52 =

Near-Earth asteroid

(16960) 1998 QS_{52}
Discovery
- Discovered by: LINEAR
- Discovery site: Lincoln Lab's ETS
- Discovery date: 25 August 1998

Designations
- Minor planet category: Apollo · NEO · PHA

Orbital characteristics
- Epoch 4 September 2017 (JD 2458000.5)
- Uncertainty parameter 0
- Observation arc: 34.36 yr (12,551 days)
- Aphelion: 4.0928 AU
- Perihelion: 0.3133 AU
- Semi-major axis: 2.2030 AU
- Eccentricity: 0.8578
- Orbital period (sidereal): 3.27 yr (1,194 days)
- Mean anomaly: 244.09°
- Mean motion: 0° 18^{m} 5.04^{s} / day
- Inclination: 17.546°
- Longitude of ascending node: 260.48°
- Argument of perihelion: 242.95°
- Earth MOID: 0.0144 AU (5.6 LD)

Physical characteristics
- Mean diameter: 3.3±0.3 km
- Synodic rotation period: 2.900±0.001 h (alternative) (Note: Lightcurve plot of (16960) 1998 QS_{52}: alternative period solution of 2.900±0.001 hours with a brightness amplitude of 0.24±0.02 mag. Quality Code of 2. Summary figures at the LCDB); 5.789±0.001 h 5.8±0.1 h
- Geometric albedo: 0.20 (assumed)
- Spectral type: SMASS = Sq · Sr
- Absolute magnitude (H): 14.3 · 14.79±0.23

(16960) 1998 QS_{52} is a stony asteroid on a highly eccentric orbit, classified as a near-Earth object and potentially hazardous asteroid of the Apollo group, approximately 4.1 kilometers (2.5 mi) in diameter. It was discovered on 25 August 1998, by astronomers of the LINEAR program at Lincoln Laboratory's Experimental Test Site near Socorro, New Mexico, in the United States. This asteroid is one of the largest potentially hazardous asteroids known to exist.

== Orbit and classification ==
1998 QS_{52} is a member of the dynamical Apollo group, which are Earth-crossing asteroids. Apollo asteroids are the largest subgroup of near-Earth objects. It orbits the Sun at a distance of 0.31–4.1 AU once every 3 years and 3 months (1,194 days; semi-major axis of 2.20 AU). Its orbit has an exceptionally high eccentricity of 0.86 and an inclination of 18° with respect to the ecliptic.

The body's observation arc begins with a precovery taken at the Siding Spring Observatory in June 1983, more than 15 years prior to its official discovery observation at Socorro.

=== Close approaches ===
With an absolute magnitude of 14.3, 1998 QS_{52} is one of the brightest and largest known potentially hazardous asteroid (see PHA-list). It has an Earth minimum orbital intersection distance of 0.0144 AU (2,150,000 km), which corresponds to 5.6 lunar distances. Its eccentric orbit leads to close approaches with Mercury and Venus and carries it beyond the asteroid belt but not as far as to the orbit of Jupiter (>4.9 AU). It is therefore also a Venus- and Mars-crossing asteroid.

== Physical characteristics ==
In the SMASS classification, 1998 QS_{52} is a Sq-subtype, that transitions between the stony S- and Q-type asteroids. Observers at the NASA Infrared Telescope Facility have also characterized this body as an Sr-type, which transitions to the rare R-type asteroids.

=== Rotation period ===
In 2008, two rotational lightcurves of 1998 QS_{52} were obtained independently from photometric observations by Brian Warner at the Palmer Divide Observatory and by Brian Skiff during the Lowell Observatory Near-Earth Asteroid Photometric Survey (NEAPS) . Lightcurve analysis gave a rotation period of 5.789 and 5.8 hours with a brightness amplitude of 0.24 and 1.4 magnitude, respectively (U=2/2). An alternative period solution of 2.9 hours – or half of the above period – is also possible, though considered less likely by Warner.

=== Diameter and albedo ===
1998 QS_{52} has not been observed by any of the space-based surveys such as IRAS, Akari or the Wide-field Infrared Survey Explorer. The Collaborative Asteroid Lightcurve Link assumes a stony standard albedo of 0.20 for its surface, and calculates a diameter of 4.10 kilometers based on an absolute magnitude of 14.3.

== Numbering and naming ==
This minor planet was numbered by the Minor Planet Center on 13 September 2000. As of 2018, it has not been named.
