= DLR-Archenhold Near Earth Objects Precovery Survey =

DANEOPS, the DLR-Archenhold Near Earth Objects Precovery Survey, has been initiated to systematically search existing photographic plate archives for precovery images of known NEOs, and has thus far successfully precovered 146 objects.
