= 4197 Morpheus =

Near-Earth asteroid

Discovery
- Discovered by: E. F. Helin; E. Shoemaker
- Discovery site: Palomar Obs.
- Discovery date: 11 October 1982

Designations
- Pronunciation: /ˈmɔːrfiːəs/
- Named after: Morpheus (mythology and movie)
- Alternative designations: 1982 TA
- Minor planet category: Apollo · NEO; Mars-crosser; Venus-crosser

Orbital characteristics
- Epoch 4 September 2017 (JD 2458000.5)
- Uncertainty parameter 0
- Observation arc: 61.98 yr (22,639 days)
- Earliest precovery date: 3 September 1954
- Aphelion: 4.0690 AU
- Perihelion: 0.5246 AU
- Semi-major axis: 2.2968 AU
- Eccentricity: 0.7716
- Orbital period (sidereal): 3.48 yr (1,271 days)
- Mean anomaly: 339.88°
- Mean motion: 0° 16^{m} 59.16^{s} / day
- Inclination: 12.577°
- Longitude of ascending node: 7.1844°
- Argument of perihelion: 122.40°
- Earth MOID: 0.0987 AU · 38.5 LD

Physical characteristics
- Mean diameter: 1.8 km (dated); 2.20 km (dated); 2.98 km (taken); 2.981 km 3.043±0.156 km
- Synodic rotation period: 3.5372 h 3.5380 h 3.5387 h 3.540±0.001 h 3.560 h
- Geometric albedo: 0.2389; 0.276±0.077; 0.44
- Spectral type: SMASS = Sq · S
- Absolute magnitude (H): 14.6 · 14.8 · 14.88

4197 Morpheus, provisional designation 1982 TA, is a highly eccentric asteroid and near-Earth object of the Apollo group, approximately 3 kilometers in diameter. It was discovered on 11 October 1982, by American astronomers Eleanor Helin and Eugene Shoemaker at Palomar Observatory in California, United States. The asteroid was later named for Morpheus from Greek mythology.

== Orbit and classification ==
Morpheus orbits the Sun at a distance of 0.5–4.1 AU once every 3 years and 6 months (1,271 days). Its orbit has an eccentricity of 0.77 and an inclination of 13° with respect to the ecliptic. Due to this elongated orbit, the asteroid is both, a Mars-crosser and a Venus-crosser.

It has a minimum orbit intersection distance with Earth of 0.0987 AU (14,800,000 km), which corresponds to 38.5 lunar distances.

A first precovery was taken at the discovering observatory in 1954, extending the body's observation arc by 28 years prior to its official discovery observation.

== Physical characteristics ==
On the SMASS taxonomic scheme, Morpheus is classified as a stony Sq sub-type, which transitions from the common S-type to the rather rare Q-type asteroids.

=== Diameter and albedo ===
In the 1990s, Tom Gehrels gave a first diameter estimate for Morpheus of 1.8 kilometers. According to the survey carried out by the NEOWISE mission of NASA's Wide-field Infrared Survey Explorer (WISE), it measures 3.043 kilometers in diameter and its surface has an albedo of 0.276. In 2012, a revision of the published WISE-data by Petr Pravec gave a diameter of 2.981 kilometers and an albedo of 0.2389. The Collaborative Asteroid Lightcurve Link adopts the revised WISE-data and takes a diameter of 2.98 kilometers with an absolute magnitude of 14.8.

=== Rotation and shape ===
In 1996, a rotational lightcurve was obtained by Czech astronomer Petr Pravec at the Ondřejov Observatory during the body's close approach to Earth within 0.1 AU. It gave a well-defined rotation period of 3.5380 hours with a brightness variation of 0.49 magnitude (U=3).

At the same time, astronomers at the Goldstone Observatory analysed Morpheus using radar delay-Doppler imaging. The resultant images are not very clear, but they show that the body has a roughly triangular shape, and a 3-hour rotation period.

Seven years later, during the asteroid's next close approach in 2003, Morpheus was observed for five nights by Slovak astronomer Adrián Galád at the Modra Observatory. Lightcurve analysis showed a concurring period of 3.5387 hours and an amplitude of 0.4 in magnitude (U=3).

== Naming ==
This minor planet was named after Morpheus from Greek mythology. He is a god of dreams who appears in the poem Metamorphoses written by the Roman poet Ovid. He is capable to imitate any human form and to appear in dreams.

The approved naming citation was published by the Minor Planet Center on 5 January 2015 (M.P.C. 91790).
