= (394130) 2006 HY51 =

Asteroid

(394130) 2006 HY_{51}
Discovery
- Discovered by: LINEAR
- Discovery site: Lincoln Lab's ETS
- Discovery date: 26 April 2006

Designations
- Minor planet category: Apollo; NEO; Mercury crosser; Venus crosser; Earth crosser; Mars crosser; Jupiter crosser

Orbital characteristics
- Epoch 4 September 2017 (JD 2458000.5)
- Uncertainty parameter 1
- Observation arc: 9.00 yr (3,286 days)
- Aphelion: 5.1111 AU
- Perihelion: 0.0791 AU
- Semi-major axis: 2.5951 AU
- Eccentricity: 0.9695
- Orbital period (sidereal): 4.18 yr (1,527 days)
- Mean anomaly: 238.94°
- Mean motion: 0° 14^{m} 8.88^{s} / day
- Inclination: 33.195°
- Longitude of ascending node: 40.788°
- Argument of perihelion: 341.88°
- Earth MOID: 0.1064 AU (41.5 LD)
- Jupiter MOID: 0.8098 AU

Physical characteristics
- Dimensions: 1.218±0.228 km
- Geometric albedo: 0.157±0.071
- Absolute magnitude (H): 17.2

(394130) 2006 HY_{51} is a near-Earth object of the Apollo asteroid group with a high orbital eccentricity, approximately 1.2 kilometers in diameter. It was discovered on 26 April 2006, by LINEAR at Lincoln Lab's ETS in Socorro, New Mexico, United States.

== Orbit and classification ==
2006 HY_{51} orbits the Sun at a distance of 0.1–5.1 AU once every 4 years and 2 months (1,527 days). Its orbit has an eccentricity of 0.97 and an inclination of 33° with respect to the ecliptic.

It is the asteroid with the third-smallest known perihelion of any known object orbiting the Sun. Its extreme orbital eccentricity brings it within 0.081 AU of the Sun (26% of Mercury's perihelion) and as far as 5.118 AU from the Sun (making it a Jupiter-grazer). It has a minimum orbit intersection distance with Earth of 0.1064 AU (15,900,000 km), equivalent to 41.5 lunar distances.

Any small bodies with even more eccentric orbits are likely to suffer a rotational breakup by the age comparable to that of the Solar System, although 2006 HY_{51} itself is not expected to break.

== Physical characteristics ==
According to the survey carried out by NASA's Wide-field Infrared Survey Explorer with its subsequent NEOWISE mission, 2006 HY_{51} measures 1.218 kilometers in diameter and its surface has an albedo of 0.157. The asteroid's composition and shape, as well as its rotation period remain unknown. It has an absolute magnitude of 17.2.

== Naming ==
As of 2017, this minor planet remains unnamed.
