= (374158) 2004 UL =

Sub-kilometer asteroid

Discovery
- Discovered by: LINEAR
- Discovery site: Lincoln Lab's ETS
- Discovery date: 18 October 2004

Designations
- Minor planet category: Apollo; NEO; PHA; Mercury crosser; Venus crosser; Earth crosser; Mars crosser

Orbital characteristics
- Epoch 4 September 2017 (JD 2458000.5)
- Uncertainty parameter 0
- Observation arc: 15.05 yr (5,498 days)
- Aphelion: 2.4400 AU
- Perihelion: 0.0928 AU
- Semi-major axis: 1.2664 AU
- Eccentricity: 0.9267
- Orbital period (sidereal): 1.43 yr (521 days)
- Mean anomaly: 320.92°
- Mean motion: 0° 41^{m} 29.76^{s} / day
- Inclination: 23.785°
- Longitude of ascending node: 39.575°
- Argument of perihelion: 149.57°
- Earth MOID: 0.0182 AU (7.1 LD)

Physical characteristics
- Mean diameter: 0.5–1.2 km (generic); 0.516 km (calculated)
- Synodic rotation period: 38±2 h (Note: Lightcurve plot for (374158) by B. D. Warner at the CS3-Palmer Divide Station from October/November 2014)
- Geometric albedo: 0.20 (assumed)
- Spectral type: S
- Absolute magnitude (H): 18.77 (R) (Note: Jewitt (2013). Abs. magnitude of 18.77 (R). Summary figures at Collaborative Asteroid Lightcurve Link (CALL) for (374158)); 18.8

(374158) 2004 UL is a sub-kilometer asteroid on an outstandingly eccentric orbit, classified as a near-Earth object and potentially hazardous asteroid of the Apollo group. The object is known for having the second-smallest perihelion of any known asteroid, after (137924) 2000 BD19.

It was discovered on 18 October 2004 by the Lincoln Near-Earth Asteroid Research (LINEAR) at Lincoln Lab's ETS near Socorro, New Mexico.

== Orbit and classification ==
This Apollo asteroid orbits the Sun at a distance of 0.09–2.44 AU once every 17 months (521 days; semi-major axis of 1.27 AU). Its orbit has an outstandingly high eccentricity of 0.93 and an inclination of 24° with respect to the ecliptic.

Due to its orbit, it is also a Mercury-crosser, Venus-crosser and Mars-crosser. It has an Earth minimum orbital intersection distance of 0.0182 AU (2,720,000 km), which translates into 7.1 lunar distances.

== Physical characteristics ==
2004 UL is an assumed stony S-type asteroid.

In October 2014, a rotational lightcurve for this asteroid was obtained from photometric observations by American astronomer Brian Warner at the CS3–Palmer Divide Station (U82) in Landers, California. It gave a longer-than average rotation period of 38±2 hours (most minor planets take 2–20 hours to complete a full rotation) with a high brightness variation of 1.2 magnitude, indicating a non-spheroidal shape (U=2).

Based on a generic magnitude-to-diameter conversion, 2004 UL measures between 0.5 and 1.2 kilometers. The Collaborative Asteroid Lightcurve Link assumes a standard albedo for stony asteroids of 0.20 and calculates a diameter of 0.516 kilometers with an absolute magnitude of 18.8.

== Numbering and naming ==
This minor planet was numbered by the Minor Planet Center on 18 October 2013 (M.P.C. 85347). As of 2018, it has not been named.
