= (89958) 2002 LY45 =

Asteroid that crosses the inner planets' orbits

(89958) 2002 LY_{45}
Discovery
- Discovered by: LINEAR
- Discovery date: 14 June 2002

Designations
- Minor planet category: NEO; Apollo; Mercury Crosser; Venus Crosser; Mars Crosser

Orbital characteristics
- Epoch 13 January 2016 (JD 2457400.5)
- Uncertainty parameter 0
- Observation arc: 5459 days (14.95 yr)
- Aphelion: 3.09629597 AU (463.199284 Gm)
- Perihelion: 0.18667861 AU (27.926723 Gm)
- Semi-major axis: 1.641487288 AU (245.5630031 Gm)
- Eccentricity: 0.88627472
- Orbital period (sidereal): 2.10 yr (768.17 d)
- Mean anomaly: 126.822263°
- Mean motion: 0° 28^{m} 7.137^{s} / day
- Inclination: 9.9597100°
- Longitude of ascending node: 188.48430°
- Argument of perihelion: 222.57701°
- Earth MOID: 0.00154132 AU (230,578 km)
- Mercury MOID: 0.08593 AU
- Venus MOID: 0.06819 AU
- Mars MOID: 0.04604 AU

Physical characteristics
- Dimensions: 1.2–2.7 km
- Absolute magnitude (H): 17.0

(89958) 2002 LY_{45} is an asteroid, classified as a near-Earth object of the Apollo group that is also a Mercury-crosser, Venus-crosser, and Mars-crosser. It was discovered by the LINEAR program on 14 June 2002.

== See also ==
- List of Mercury-crossing minor planets
- List of Venus-crossing minor planets
- Apollo asteroids
- List of Mars-crossing minor planets
