= (85989) 1999 JD6 =

Near-Earth asteroid

(85989) 1999 JD_{6}
- Goldstone Solar System radar image showing 1999 JD_{6} as a contact binary

Discovery
- Discovered by: LONEOS
- Discovery date: 12 May 1999

Designations
- Minor planet category: Aten; NEA; PHO

Orbital characteristics
- Epoch 13 January 2016 (JD 2457400.5)
- Uncertainty parameter 0
- Observation arc: 9167 days (25.10 yr)
- Aphelion: 1.44183 AU (215.695 Gm)
- Perihelion: 0.32425 AU (48.507 Gm)
- Semi-major axis: 0.88304 AU (132.101 Gm)
- Eccentricity: 0.63280
- Orbital period (sidereal): 0.83 yr (303.1 d)
- Mean anomaly: 137.83229°
- Mean motion: 1.18778°/day
- Inclination: 17.05701°
- Longitude of ascending node: 130.21399°
- Argument of perihelion: 309.18377°
- Earth MOID: 0.0487023 AU (7.28576 Gm)
- Jupiter MOID: 3.86909 AU (578.808 Gm)

Physical characteristics
- Dimensions: ~0.7 km × 2 km (contact binary)
- Synodic rotation period: 7.6638 h (0.31933 d)
- Geometric albedo: ~0.15
- Spectral type: K (SMASS)
- Apparent magnitude: ~16–18
- Absolute magnitude (H): 17.1

(85989) 1999 JD_{6} is an Aten asteroid, near-Earth object, and potentially hazardous object in the inner Solar System that makes frequent close approaches to Earth and Venus. On the Earth approach in 2015, it was observed by the Goldstone Solar System Radar and found to be a contact binary with the largest axis approximately 2 kilometers wide, and each lobe about 200–300 meters large. Although 1999 JD_{6} in its current orbit never passes closer than 0.047 AU to Earth, it is listed as a potentially hazardous object because it is large and might pose a threat in the future.

The asteroid is well-observed, having been observed over 2,000 times over a length of over 25 years, and was assigned a numeric designation in August 2004.

== July 2015 Earth passage ==
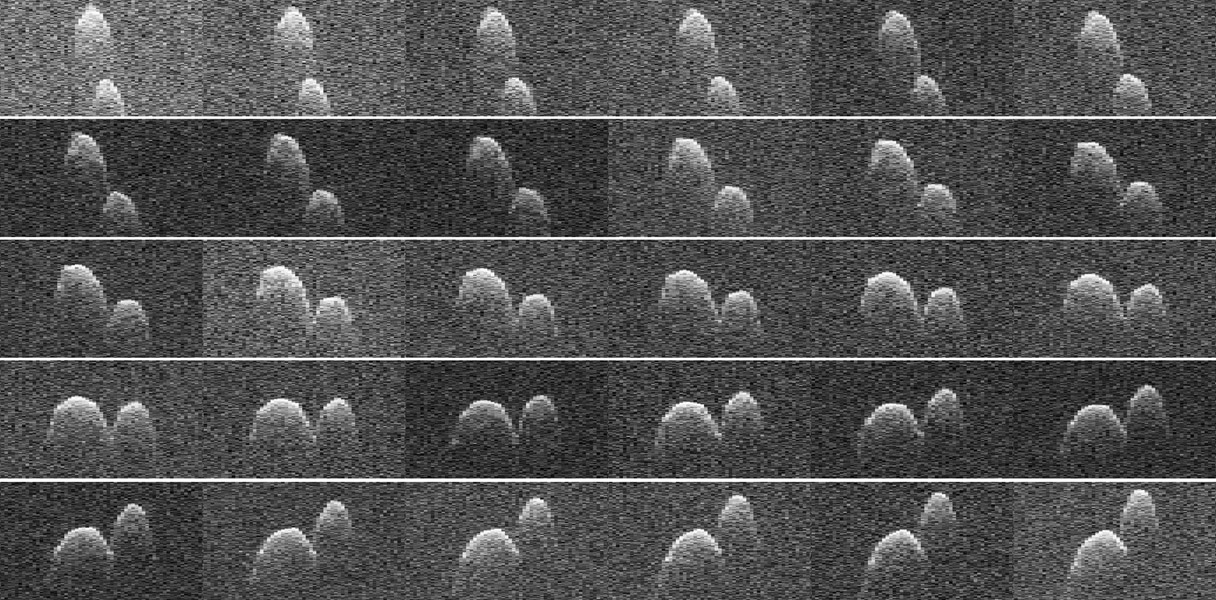
Series of Goldstone Solar System radar images showing the rotation of 1999 JD_{6}

On 24 July 2015 1999 JD_{6} came as close as 19 lunar distances to Earth. It was imaged by radar, and shown to be a contact binary, about 2 kilometers (1.2 miles) on its long axis.

== See also ==
- Contact binary (asteroid)
