= (66146) 1998 TU3 =

Near-Earth asteroid

(66146) 1998 TU_{3}
- Lightcurve-derived shape model of 1998 TU_{3}

Discovery
- Discovered by: LINEAR
- Discovery site: Lincoln Laboratory ETS
- Discovery date: 13 October 1998

Designations
- Minor planet category: NEO · Aten

Orbital characteristics
- Epoch 9 June 2026 (JD 2461200.5)
- Uncertainty parameter 0
- Aphelion: 1.1685 AU
- Perihelion: 0.40662 AU
- Semi-major axis: 0.78757 AU
- Eccentricity: 0.4837
- Orbital period (sidereal): 255.289 d (0.69894 yr)
- Mean anomaly: 356.822°
- Mean motion: 1.4102° / d
- Inclination: 5.4153°
- Longitude of ascending node: 101.877°
- Argument of perihelion: 84.9880°
- Earth MOID: 0.07370 AU (28.68 LD)
- T_{Jupiter}: 7.285

Physical characteristics
- Mean diameter: 2.864±1.165 km
- Sidereal rotation period: 2.377473±0.000002 h (Note: YORP effect-modelled period)
- Axial tilt: 157°±1°
- Pole ecliptic longitude: 64°±5°
- Pole ecliptic latitude: −71°±2°
- Geometric albedo: 0.224±0.216
- Absolute magnitude (H): 14.36

(66146) 1998 TU_{3} is a moderately large Aten-type near-Earth asteroid. It was discovered on 13 October 1998 by the LINEAR program at Lincoln Laboratory ETS in New Mexico, United States. It is about 2–3 kilometers in diameter and has a rapid rotation, spinning once every 2.38 hours. Its very high axial tilt of 157° means that it rotates in a retrograde direction, opposite in direction to Earth. Its rotation may be affected by the YORP effect.

== Orbit ==
1998 TU_{3} orbits the Sun on an elliptical orbit at an average distance of 0.79 astronomical units (AU), taking 255 Earth days to complete one orbit. It has an orbital eccentricity of 0.48, causing its distance from the Sun to range from 0.41 AU at perihelion to 1.17 AU at aphelion. Since it is an Earth-crossing asteroid with a semi-major axis of less than one AU, it is classified as an Aten asteroid. It has a relatively low orbital inclination of about 5.4° with respect to the ecliptic plane.

== Physical characteristics ==
Various estimates of 1998 TU_{3}'s size using data from the Wide-field Infrared Survey Explorer (WISE) range from about 2.7–3.3 km. Shape models derived from its observed light curve show that it is relatively rounded and elongated in shape with an equatorial ridge. Observations from the Center of Solar System Studies in 2017 detected an apparent mutual event (such as an occultation or eclipse), suggesting the presence of a satellite with an orbital period of 13.6 hours. However, later photometric observations support a single object that is likely a rubble pile.

1998 TU_{3} has a rapid rotation period of about 2.38 hours. Long-term observations over a period of 14 years show that its rotation period is gradually lengthening. It has a high axial tilt of about 157°, spinning in a retrograde direction. Its high axial tilt and lengthening rotation period suggest that its spin is being affected by the YORP effect. However, the YORP effect's intensity drops dramatically with respect to increasing size – 1998 TU_{3} is near the maximum asteroid size where the effect has been demonstrated – making its effects on the asteroid difficult to confirm.
