= 2005 HC4 =

Asteroid

2005 HC_{4}
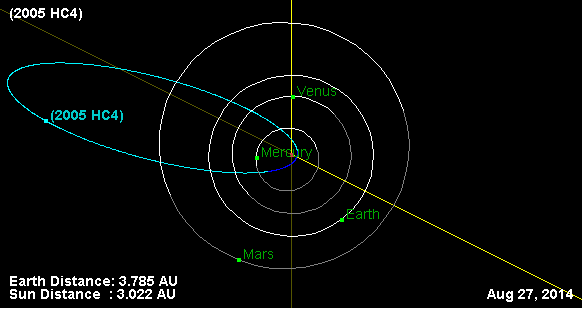

Discovery
- Discovered by: LONEOS
- Discovery date: 30 April 2005

Designations
- Minor planet category: Mercury Crosser; Venus Crosser; Apollo Asteroid; Mars Crosser

Orbital characteristics
- Epoch 3 May 2005 (JD 2453493.5)
- Uncertainty parameter 9
- Aphelion: 3.5707 AU (534.17 Gm)
- Perihelion: 0.070657 AU (10.5701 Gm)
- Semi-major axis: 1.8207 AU (272.37 Gm)
- Eccentricity: 0.96119
- Orbital period (sidereal): 2.46 yr (897.30 d)
- Mean anomaly: 341.42°
- Mean motion: 0° 24^{m} 4.32^{s} /day
- Inclination: 8.3967°
- Longitude of ascending node: 63.790°
- Argument of perihelion: 309.01°
- Earth MOID: 0.0615074 AU (9.20138 Gm)
- Jupiter MOID: 1.92798 AU (288.422 Gm)

Physical characteristics
- Dimensions: 210–480 m
- Absolute magnitude (H): 20.7

2005 HC_{4} is the asteroid with the second-smallest perihelion and was the asteroid with the smallest known perihelion of any known object orbiting the Sun from 2005 to 2024 (except sungrazing comets). Its extreme orbital eccentricity brings it to within 0.071 AU of the Sun (23% of Mercury's perihelion) and takes it as far as 3.562 AU from the Sun (well beyond the orbit of Mars). Since then, another asteroid, 2024 YL3, has been found to have a closer perihelion, at about 0.070 AU. Due to its very small perihelion and comparably large aphelion, 2005 HC_{4} achieves the fastest speed of any known asteroid bound to the Solar System with a velocity of 157 km/s (565,000 km/h; 351,000 mi/h) at perihelion (there are comets, however, which obtain much higher speeds).

== See also ==
- List of Mercury-crossing minor planets
- List of Venus-crossing minor planets
- Apollo asteroids
- List of Mars-crossing minor planets
