= 5786 Talos =

Asteroid with small perihelion distance

Talos
Discovery
- Discovered by: R. H. McNaught
- Discovery site: Siding Spring
- Discovery date: 3 September 1991

Designations
- Pronunciation: /ˈteɪlɒs/
- Alternative designations: 1991 RC
- Minor planet category: NEO; Apollo

Orbital characteristics
- Epoch 13 January 2016 (JD 2457400.5)
- Uncertainty parameter 0
- Observation arc: 8810 days (24.12 yr)
- Aphelion: 1.9757 AU (295.56 Gm)
- Perihelion: 0.18724 AU (28.011 Gm)
- Semi-major axis: 1.0815 AU (161.79 Gm)
- Eccentricity: 0.82687
- Orbital period (sidereal): 1.12 yr (410.79 d)
- Mean anomaly: 353.29°
- Mean motion: 0° 52^{m} 34.86^{s} / day
- Inclination: 23.234°
- Longitude of ascending node: 161.312°
- Argument of perihelion: 8.3478°
- Earth MOID: 0.188899 AU (28.2589 Gm)

Physical characteristics
- Mean diameter: 0.89 km
- Synodic rotation period: 38.52 h (1.605 d)
- Absolute magnitude (H): 17.1

5786 Talos /ˈteɪlɒs/ is an Apollo asteroid discovered on 3 September 1991 by R. H. McNaught at Siding Spring. It has a very small perihelion distance; only two other named asteroids have one less than 0.2 AU, 1566 Icarus and 3200 Phaethon.
