= 37655 Illapa =

Asteroid

Discovery
- Discovered by: C. S. Shoemaker; E. M. Shoemaker
- Discovery site: Palomar Obs.
- Discovery date: 1 August 1994

Designations
- Named after: Illapa (Inca mythology)
- Alternative designations: 1994 PM
- Minor planet category: NEO · Apollo · PHA

Orbital characteristics
- Epoch 13 January 2016 (JD 2457400.5)
- Uncertainty parameter 0
- Observation arc: 7645 days (20.93 yr)
- Aphelion: 2.5901 AU (387.47 Gm)
- Perihelion: 0.36604 AU (54.759 Gm)
- Semi-major axis: 1.4780 AU (221.11 Gm)
- Eccentricity: 0.75235
- Orbital period (sidereal): 1.80 yr (656.34 d)
- Mean anomaly: 299.48°
- Mean motion: 0° 32^{m} 54.564^{s} / day
- Inclination: 18.002°
- Longitude of ascending node: 139.70°
- Argument of perihelion: 303.72°
- Earth MOID: 0.0235523 AU (3.52337 Gm)

Physical characteristics
- Mean diameter: 0.792–1.772 km (est.); 1.5 km (generic at 0.057)
- Synodic rotation period: 2.6556 h
- Spectral type: C
- Absolute magnitude (H): 17.9

37655 Illapa (provisional designation 1994 PM) is a carbonaceous asteroid, classified as a near-Earth object and potentially hazardous asteroid of the Apollo group, approximately 1.5 kilometers in diameter. It was discovered on 1 August 1994 by American astronomer couple Carolyn and Eugene Shoemaker at the Palomar Observatory in California, United States.

== Orbit and classification ==
On 16 August 2003, Illapa made a close approach to Earth of 0.025037 AU (3,750,000 km; 2,330,000 mi).

== Physical characteristics ==
Illapa has an estimated diameter of 0.8 to 1.8 kilometers for an assumed geometric albedo between 0.20 and 0.04. For an assumed albedo of 0.057, which is typical for carbonaceous C-type asteroids, and an absolute magnitude of 17.9, the asteroid has a calculated mean diameter of 1.5 kilometers. The body has a short rotation period of 2.6556 hours.

== Naming ==
This minor planet was named after Illapa (Apu Illapu), the thunder or weather god from Inca mythology.
