= 1864 Daedalus =

Stony near-Earth asteroid

Discovery
- Discovered by: T. Gehrels
- Discovery site: Palomar Obs.
- Discovery date: 24 March 1971

Designations
- Pronunciation: /ˈdɛdələs/
- Named after: Daedalus (Greek mythology)
- Alternative designations: 1971 FA
- Minor planet category: Apollo · NEO

Orbital characteristics
- Epoch 4 September 2017 (JD 2458000.5)
- Uncertainty parameter 0
- Observation arc: 46.14 yr (16,854 days)
- Aphelion: 2.3586 AU
- Perihelion: 0.5634 AU
- Semi-major axis: 1.4610 AU
- Eccentricity: 0.6144
- Orbital period (sidereal): 1.77 yr (645 days)
- Mean anomaly: 23.049°
- Mean motion: 0° 33^{m} 29.16^{s} / day
- Inclination: 22.211°
- Longitude of ascending node: 6.6379°
- Argument of perihelion: 325.64°
- Earth MOID: 0.2693 AU

Physical characteristics
- Dimensions: 2.722±0.114 km 3.00 km (derived); 3.7 km
- Synodic rotation period: 8.57 h 8.572 h 8.575±0.002 h
- Geometric albedo: 0.20 (assumed); 0.273±0.055
- Spectral type: SQ (Tholen) · Sr (SMASS); Sq · S B–V = 0.830; U–B = 0.500
- Absolute magnitude (H): 14.85 · 14.98

1864 Daedalus (provisional designation 1971 FA) is a stony asteroid and near-Earth object of the Apollo group, approximately 3 kilometers in diameter. It was discovered on 24 March 1971, by Dutch–American astronomer Tom Gehrels at Palomar Observatory, California, and named after Daedalus from Greek mythology.

== Orbit and classification ==
Daedalus is a member of the Apollo asteroids, a group of near-Earth object with an Earth-crossing orbit. It orbits the Sun in the inner main-belt at a distance of 0.6–2.4 AU once every 1 years and 9 months (645 days). Its orbit has an eccentricity of 0.61 and an inclination of 22° with respect to the ecliptic. It has an Earth minimum orbit intersection distance (MOID) of 0.2693 AU.

== Physical characteristics ==
Daedalus is a stony asteroid, characterized as an SQ and Sr spectral type in the Tholen and SMASS taxonomy.

=== Diameter and albedo ===
According to the survey carried out by NASA's Wide-field Infrared Survey Explorer with its subsequent NEOWISE mission, it measures 2.7 and 3.7 kilometers in diameter, respectively, and its surface has an albedo of 0.273. The Collaborative Asteroid Lightcurve Link assumes a standard albedo for stony asteroids of 0.20 and derives a diameter of 3.0 kilometers based on an absolute magnitude of 14.98.

=== Rotation period ===
Several rotational lightcurves of Daedalus were obtained by astronomers Tom Gehrels, Petr Pravec and Brian Warner. Lightcurve analysis gave a concurring rotation period of 8.572 hours with a high brightness variation of 0.85–1.04 magnitude, indicating a non-spheroidal shape (U=3/3/3).

== Naming ==
This minor planet was named after the Greek mythological figure Daedalus, the builder of King Minos' labyrinth, who was subsequently imprisoned there with his son Icarus. They escaped on wings of feathers and wax, but whereas Icarus was drowned when the wax in his wings melted, Daedalus went on to Sicily and built there a temple to Apollo. There is also a lunar crater called Daedalus. The official naming citation was published by the Minor Planet Center on 20 December 1974 (M.P.C. 3758).
