= (66063) 1998 RO1 =

Stony near-Earth object of the Aten group

(66063) 1998 RO_{1}
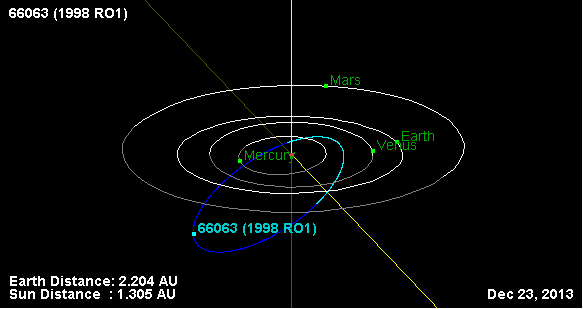
- Orbit of 1998 RO_{1}

Discovery
- Discovered by: LINEAR
- Discovery site: Lincoln Lab's ETS
- Discovery date: 14 September 1998

Designations
- Alternative designations: 1999 SN_{5}
- Minor planet category: NEO · Aten

Orbital characteristics
- Epoch 4 September 2017 (JD 2458000.5)
- Uncertainty parameter 0
- Observation arc: 13.99 yr (5,111 days)
- Aphelion: 1.7045 AU
- Perihelion: 0.2774 AU
- Semi-major axis: 0.9910 AU
- Eccentricity: 0.7200
- Orbital period (sidereal): 0.99 yr (360 days)
- Mean anomaly: 348.97°
- Mean motion: 0° 59^{m} 56.76^{s} / day
- Inclination: 22.678°
- Longitude of ascending node: 351.88°
- Argument of perihelion: 151.13°
- Known satellites: 1 (D: 0.38 km; P: 14.53 h)
- Earth MOID: 0.0921 AU · 35.9 LD

Physical characteristics
- Mean diameter: 0.62±0.25 km 0.72 km (est. at 0.20); 0.8±0.15 km 0.860 km (derived)
- Mean density: 2.8±1.3 g/cm^{3}
- Synodic rotation period: 2.4924±0.0003 h 2.4924 h
- Geometric albedo: 0.145; 0.30±0.17
- Spectral type: S
- Absolute magnitude (H): 18.00 · 18.04 · 18.05 · 18.05±0.071 · 18.1

(66063) 1998 RO_{1} is a stony near-Earth object of the Aten group on a highly-eccentric orbit. The synchronous binary system measures approximately 800 meters (0.50 miles) in diameter. It was discovered by astronomers of the Lincoln Near-Earth Asteroid Research at the Lincoln Laboratory's Experimental Test Site near Socorro, New Mexico, on 14 September 1998.

It has one minor-planet moon, discovered in September 2003. It has an orbital period of 14.53 hours and measures approximately 48% of its primary, or 380 meters. It is one of seven known Aten binaries as of 2017.

== Interaction with Earth ==
1998 RO_{1}'s orbit is very eccentric, with an aphelion beyond the orbit of Mars and a perihelion inside the orbit of Mercury. It has an orbital period of 360.29 days (0.99 years) and makes close approaches to Earth. But 1998 RO_{1} makes closer approaches to other inner planets, especially Mars. Its closest approach to a planet between 1950–2200 was to Mars, as it passed 0.00898 AU (1,343,000 km) from Mars on 18 March 1964, and will pass 0.0054 AU (810,000 km) from Mars on 12 October 2065.

== Moon ==
Binary asteroid example

1998 RO_{1} has one unnamed natural satellite. The satellite was discovered from lightcurve observations going from 13 to 28 September 2013, and was confirmed by radar observations from the Arecibo Observatory one year later. It is in a very close orbit to 1998 RO_{1}, with a semi-major axis of 800 m (2,600 ft) and an eccentricity of 0.06, giving it a periapsis of 752 m (2,467 ft) and an apoapsis of 848 m (2,782 ft). The satellite takes 14.54 hours to complete one orbit around 1998 RO_{1}.

== Numbering and naming ==
This minor planet was numbered by the Minor Planet Center on 10 September 2003. As of 2018, it has not been named.
