= Aten asteroid =

Group of near-Earth asteroids

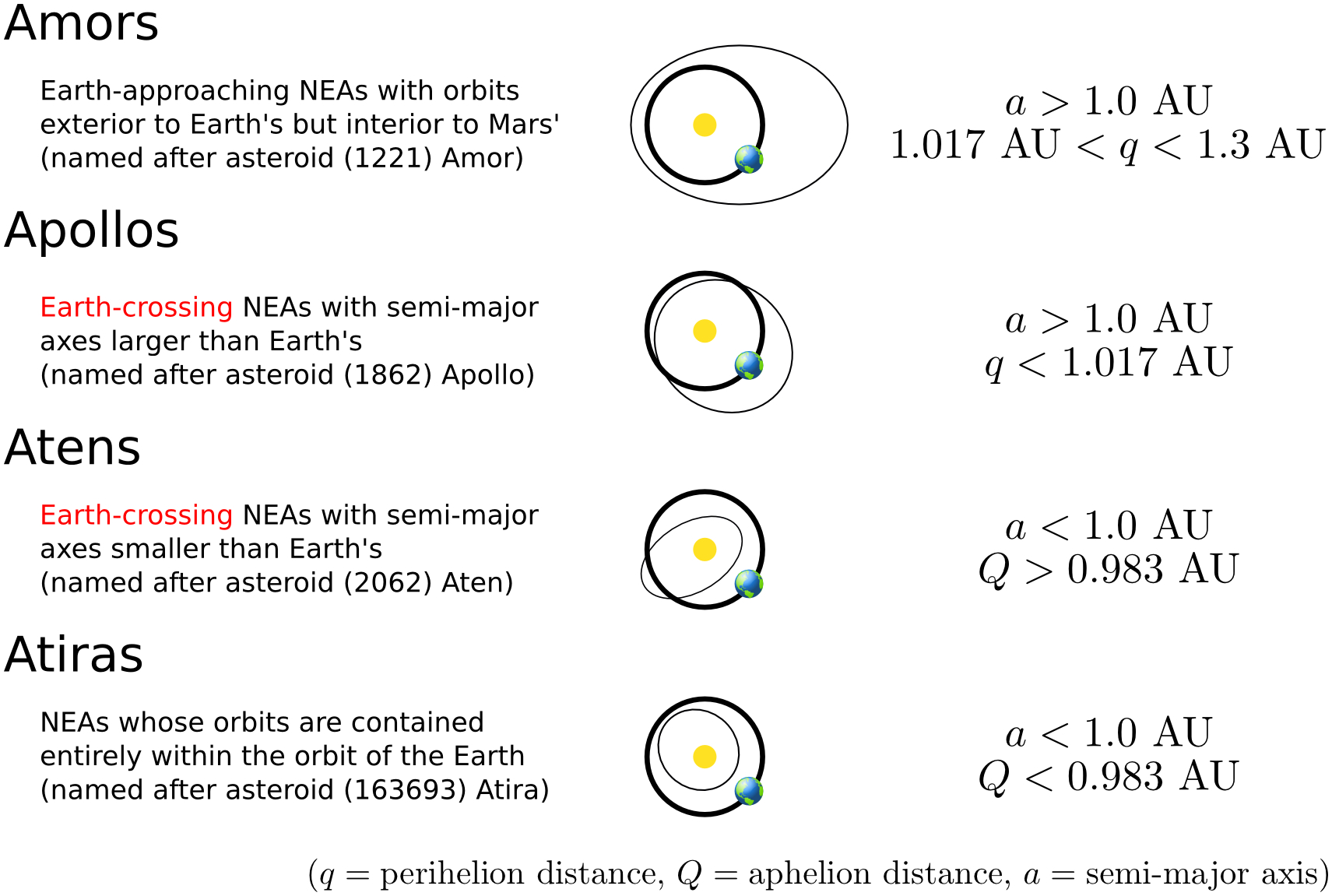
Common orbital subgroups of Near-Earth Objects (NEOs)

The Aten asteroids are a dynamical group of asteroids whose orbits bring them into proximity with Earth. By definition, Atens are Earth-crossing asteroids (a < 1.0 AU and Q > 0.983 AU). The group is named after 2062 Aten, the first of its kind, discovered on 7 January 1976 by American astronomer Eleanor Helin at Palomar Observatory. As of January 2025, 2,966 Atens have been discovered, of which 271 are numbered, 14 are named, and 197 are classified as potentially hazardous asteroids.

== Description ==
Aten asteroids are defined by having a semi-major axis (a) of less than 1.0 astronomical unit (AU), the roughly average distance from the Earth to the Sun. They also have an aphelion (Q; furthest distance from the Sun) greater than 0.983 AU. This defines them as Earth-crossing asteroids as the orbit of Earth varies between 0.983 and 1.017 AU.

Asteroids' orbits can be highly eccentric. Nearly all known Aten asteroids have an aphelion greater than 1 AU. Observation of objects inferior to the Earth's orbit is difficult, and this difficulty may contribute to sampling bias in the apparent preponderance of eccentric Atens. Aten asteroids account for only about 7.4% of the known near-Earth asteroid population. Many more Apollo-class asteroids are known than Aten-class asteroids, possibly because of the sampling bias.

The shortest semi-major axis for any known Aten asteroid is 0.580 AU, for object 2016 XK_{24}. The Aten asteroid with the smallest known perihelion is also the one with the highest known eccentricity: (137924) 2000 BD19 has an orbit with an eccentricity of 0.895, which takes it from a perihelion of 0.092 AU, well within Mercury's orbit, to an aphelion of 1.66 AU, which is greater than the semi-major axis of Mars (1.53 AU).

Aten asteroids are generally named after Egyptian deities.

== NEO types ==
Definition of NEO subgroups in AU
Group	q	a	Q	ECA
Amors	> 1.017	>1.0	–	✗
Apollos	< 1.017	>1.0	–	✓
Atens	–	<1.0	> 0.983	✓
Atiras	–	<1.0	< 0.983	✗
For all NEOs q is < 1.3 AU; The orbit of Earth varies between 0.983 and 1.017 AU

== See also ==
- Alinda asteroid
- Amor asteroid
- Apollo asteroid
- Atira asteroid
- List of minor planets
