= 2021 PH27 =

Near-Earth asteroid of the Atira group

2021 PH_{27}
- Discovery images of 2021 PH_{27} from the Dark Energy Camera in August 2021

Discovery
- Discovered by: S. S. Sheppard
- Discovery site: Cerro Tololo Obs.
- Discovery date: 13 August 2021

Designations
- Alternative designations: v13aug1
- Minor planet category: Atira · NEO

Orbital characteristics
- Epoch 2025 May 05 (JD 2460800.5)
- Uncertainty parameter 2
- Observation arc: 6.63 yr (2,421 days)
- Earliest precovery date: 16 July 2017
- Aphelion: 0.7903 AU
- Perihelion: 0.1331 AU
- Semi-major axis: 0.4617 AU
- Eccentricity: 0.7116
- Orbital period (sidereal): 0.31 yr (114.60 days)
- Mean anomaly: 140.26°
- Mean motion: 3° 8^{m} 28.02^{s} / day
- Inclination: 31.941°
- Longitude of ascending node: 39.396°
- Time of perihelion: 7 October 2021 @ 106 km/s
- Argument of perihelion: 8.579°
- Earth MOID: 0.2254 AU
- Mercury MOID: 0.1123 AU
- Venus MOID: 0.0147 AU

Physical characteristics
- Mean diameter: 1.2±0.5 km
- Synodic rotation period: 3.49±0.01 h
- Geometric albedo: 0.098±0.081 (assumed for X-type asteroids)
- Spectral type: X
- Apparent magnitude: 19.3 (discovery); 14 (unobservable) (Note: For example on 2023-May-03, 2021 PH_{27} can get as bright as apparent magnitude 13.8 when near perihelion on the far side of the Sun and in the full phase. But during perihelion it is also in solar conjunction and not observable. When on the near side in solar conjunction, it can get fainter than magnitude 30.)
- Absolute magnitude (H): 17.67±0.24

2021 PH_{27} is a kilometer-sized Atira-type near-Earth asteroid orbiting very close to the Sun. It was discovered by Scott Sheppard using the Dark Energy Camera (DECam) at Cerro Tololo Inter-American Observatory on 13 August 2021. 2021 PH_{27} has the smallest semi-major axis and shortest orbital period among all known asteroids as of 2026, and the second smallest semi-major axis of any known object orbiting the sun, behind Mercury, with a velocity at perihelion of 106 km/s (240,000 mph). It also has the largest relativistic perihelion shift of any known object orbiting the Sun, 1.6 times that of Mercury. 2021 PH_{27} shares an identical orbit and color as 2025 GN1, which has led astronomers to believe that the two asteroids split apart from a parent body over 10,500 years ago.

== Discovery ==
2021 PH_{27} was discovered by astronomer Scott Sheppard using the Dark Energy Survey's DECam imager at Cerro Tololo Observatory in Chile on 13 August 2021, two days after the asteroid had reached aphelion (its furthest distance from the Sun.) The observations were conducted at twilight to search for undiscovered minor planets situated at low elongations from the Sun. The object was discovered at apparent magnitude 19, with a solar elongation of 37 degrees when it was on the far side of the Sun at an Earth distance of 1.3 AU (190 million km). It was then reported to the Minor Planet Center's Near-Earth Object Confirmation Page under the temporary designation v13aug1. Over five days, follow-up observations were conducted by various observatories including Las Campanas (304), Las Cumbres (K91), (W85), (W87), and (Q63), SONEAR (Y00), and iTelescope (Q62). The object was then provisionally designated 2021 PH_{27} by the Minor Planet Center and announced on 21 August 2021. Even in April 2021, the asteroid was never more than 45 degrees from the Sun.

Precovery observations of 2021 PH_{27} were found in archival Dark Energy Survey images from 16 July 2017. These observations were published by the Minor Planet Center on 10 October 2021.

== Orbit and classification ==
2021 PH_{27} orbits the Sun at a distance of 0.13–0.79 AU once every 4 months (114 days; semi-major axis of 0.46 AU). Its orbit has an eccentricity of 0.71 and an inclination of 32 degrees with respect to the ecliptic. It is classified as a near-Earth object (NEO) due its perihelion distance being less than 1.3 AU. It also falls under the NEO category of Atira asteroids, whose orbits are confined entirely within Earth's orbit at 1 AU from the Sun. Its orbit crosses the paths of Mercury and Venus, with nominal minimum orbit intersection distances of 0.11 AU and 0.015 AU, respectively.

As of 2021, 2021 PH_{27} holds the record for the smallest semi-major axis (0.46 AU) and shortest orbital period (114 days) of any known asteroid, supplanting 2019 LF6 and 594913 ꞌAylóꞌchaxnim (0.56 AU, 151 days). For comparison, Mercury has a semi-major axis of 0.39 AU and an orbital period of 88 days. Being so close to the Sun, at perihelion the asteroid is moving at 106 km/s (240,000 mph). The relativistic perihelion shift of this object is 1.6 times that of Mercury, which is 42.9 arcseconds per century.

With an observation arc over 4 years, the orbit quality of 2021 PH_{27} is well secured, with an uncertainty parameter of 2. It currently comes closer to Venus than to any of the other planets. Deep close encounters with Venus control its long-term orbital evolution. As with many other Atira asteroids, it is subjected to the von Zeipel-Lidov-Kozai secular resonance.

Venus Approach 2022-Oct-26 (as known with a 4.15 yr observation arc)
Nominal distance (AU)	Minimum distance (AU)	Maximum distance (AU)
0.01618 AU (2.420 million km)	0.01618 AU (2.420 million km)	0.01618 AU (2.420 million km)

== Physical characteristics ==
Observations of 2021 PH_{27} in different light filters show that it has a neutral to slightly reddish color with a spectral type of X. The compositions of X-type asteroids are ambiguous and may correspond to spectral types of either E (enstatite composition), M (metallic composition), or P (organic-rich silicate composition).

2021 PH_{27} is estimated to have a diameter of 1.2 ± 0.5 km (0.75 ± 0.31 mi), based on its absolute magnitude of 17.7 and an assumed X-type asteroid geometric albedo of 0.098±0.081. The brightness of 2021 PH_{27} periodically fluctuates with an amplitude of about 0.1 magnitudes, which could indicate an elongated shape. Observations from February to April 2022 have shown that 2021 PH_{27} rotates with a period of 3.49 hours. Due to the asteroid's close proximity to the Sun, the YORP effect can double its rotation rate in 150±50 thousand years.

At perihelion, the Sun heats the surface of 2021 PH_{27} up to temperatures of over 1,000 K (730 °C; 1,340 °F), before cooling down as the surface rotates away from the Sun. Due to the resulting temperature differences between 2021 PH_{27}'s dayside and nightside areas, thermal shock is theorized to have caused numerous surface fractures on the asteroid. Despite its extreme thermal environment, 2021 PH_{27} does not show evidence of dust ejection nor blue tinting of its surface by heated refractory organics.

== Fragment ==
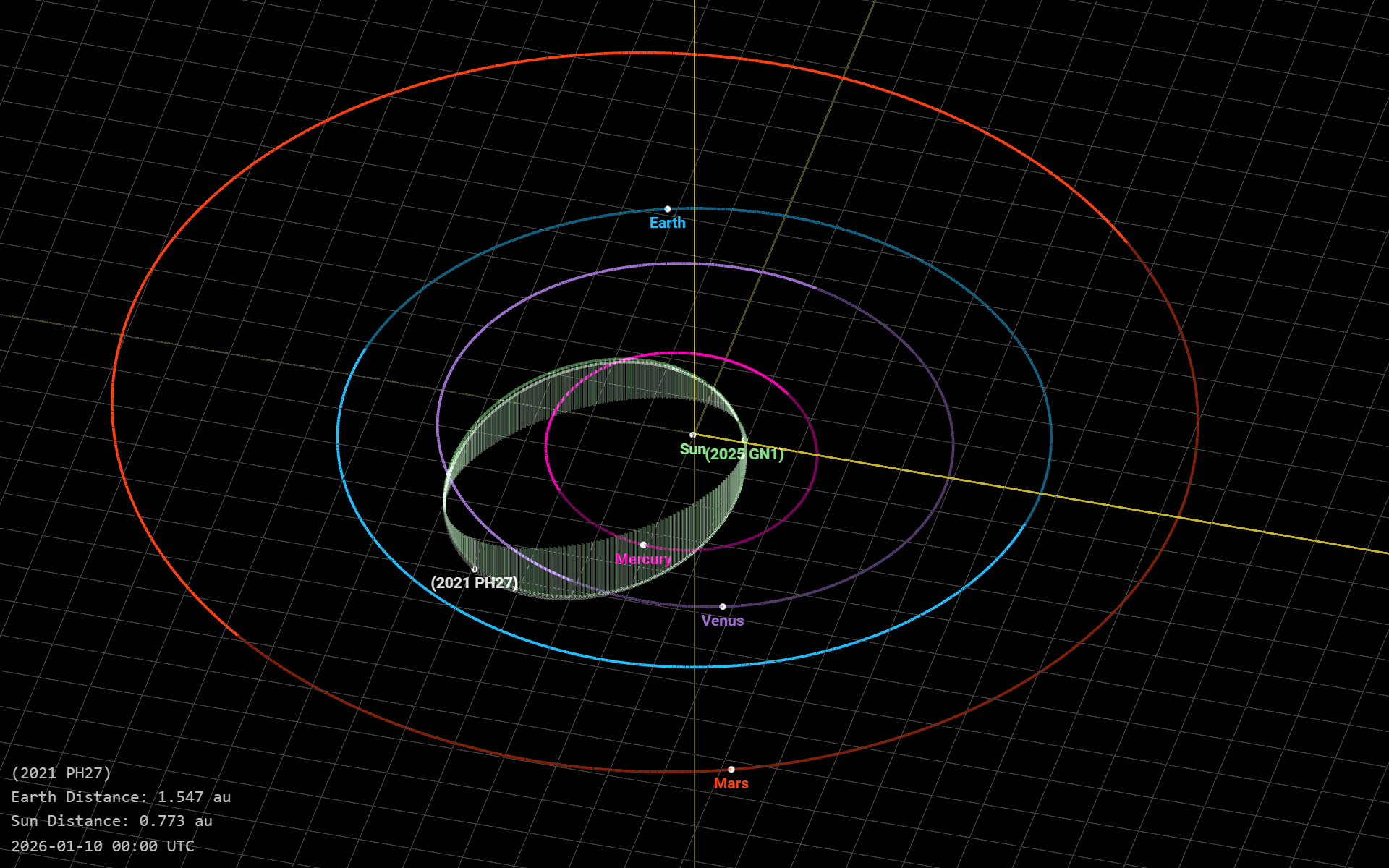
The orbits of 2025 GN_{1} (green) and 2021 PH_{27} (white) are nearly identical, as shown in this diagram.

The 400 m (1,300 ft)-diameter near-Earth asteroid 2025 GN1 has an orbit and color very similar to those of 2021 PH_{27}, which has led to the hypothesis that these two asteroids may be related as an asteroid pair. Scott Sheppard and colleagues suggested that either 2021 PH_{27} and 2025 GN_{1} are fragments of a once larger parent asteroid, or 2025 GN_{1} is a fragment directly from 2021 PH_{27}. The fragmentation of the parent body may have been caused by either thermal stress, tidal disruption by close planetary encounters, rotational spin-up by the YORP effect, or an escaped satellite.

== Numbering and naming ==
As of 2025, this minor planet has neither been numbered nor named by the Minor Planet Center.

== See also ==
- Vulcanoids, a hypothetical population of asteroids within Mercury's orbit
- 2019 LF6, low semi-major axis Atira asteroid
- 2019 AQ3, another low semi-major axis Atira asteroid
- 594913 ꞌAylóꞌchaxnim, the first asteroid discovered that always stays within Venus' orbit
- 3200 Phaethon – a low-perihelion near-Earth asteroid that hosts an asteroid group with (155140) 2005 UD and (225416) 1999 YC
- 1566 Icarus – another low-perihelion near-Earth asteroid belonging to an asteroid pair with 2007 MK6
