= 2007 MK6 =

Near-Earth asteroid

2007 MK_{6}
Discovery (Note: Discoverer not yet assigned by the MPC)
- Discovery date: 27 May 2006 (First reported obs.)

Designations
- Alternative designations: 2006 KT_{67}
- Minor planet category: NEO · Apollo

Orbital characteristics
- Epoch 21 November 2025 (JD 2461000.5)
- Uncertainty parameter 0
- Aphelion: 1.9661 AU
- Perihelion: 0.1959 AU
- Semi-major axis: 1.0810 AU
- Eccentricity: 0.8188
- Orbital period (sidereal): 1.1239 yr (410.518 d)
- Mean anomaly: 180.477°
- Mean motion: 0.8769° / d
- Inclination: 25.1246°
- Longitude of ascending node: 92.846°
- Argument of perihelion: 25.514°
- Earth MOID: 0.0869 AU
- T_{Jupiter}: 5.287

Physical characteristics
- Mean diameter: 180 m (calculated)
- Geometric albedo: 0.40 (assumed)
- Absolute magnitude (H): 20.18

2007 MK_{6} is a small, unnamed near-Earth asteroid on a highly eccentric Apollo-type orbit. First reported on 27 May 2006 by Mount Lemmon Survey in Arizona, United States, it was lost until it was recovered a year later by Catalina Sky Survey. It forms an asteroid pair with 1566 Icarus, and the two share similar orbital elements, having likely separated within the past 10 million years.

== History ==
2007 MK_{6} was first detected on 27 May 2006 by Mount Lemmon Survey in Arizona, United States. It was given the provisional designation 2006 KT_{67} by the Minor Planet Center (MPC), and its detection was announced in a Minor Planet Electronic Circular (MPEC) that same day. Observations extended one day earlier to 26 May, but with a single-day observation arc the asteroid became lost.

On 21 June 2007, the asteroid was recovered by Catalina Sky Survey, and its detection was announced in an MPEC on 23 June. At that time it was not recognized as the same object observed by Mount Lemmon in 2006, and it was given a different provisional designation 2007 MK_{6}. Soon after, a team of astronomers led by Katsuhito Ohtsuka linked 2007 MK_{6} with 2006 KT_{67}, and the identification was released in an MPEC on 28 June. 2007 MK_{6} remains its primary provisional designation.

As of 2025, the asteroid has not been numbered or named by the MPC. It also has not been formally assigned a discoverer, which will happen once it is numbered.

== Orbit ==
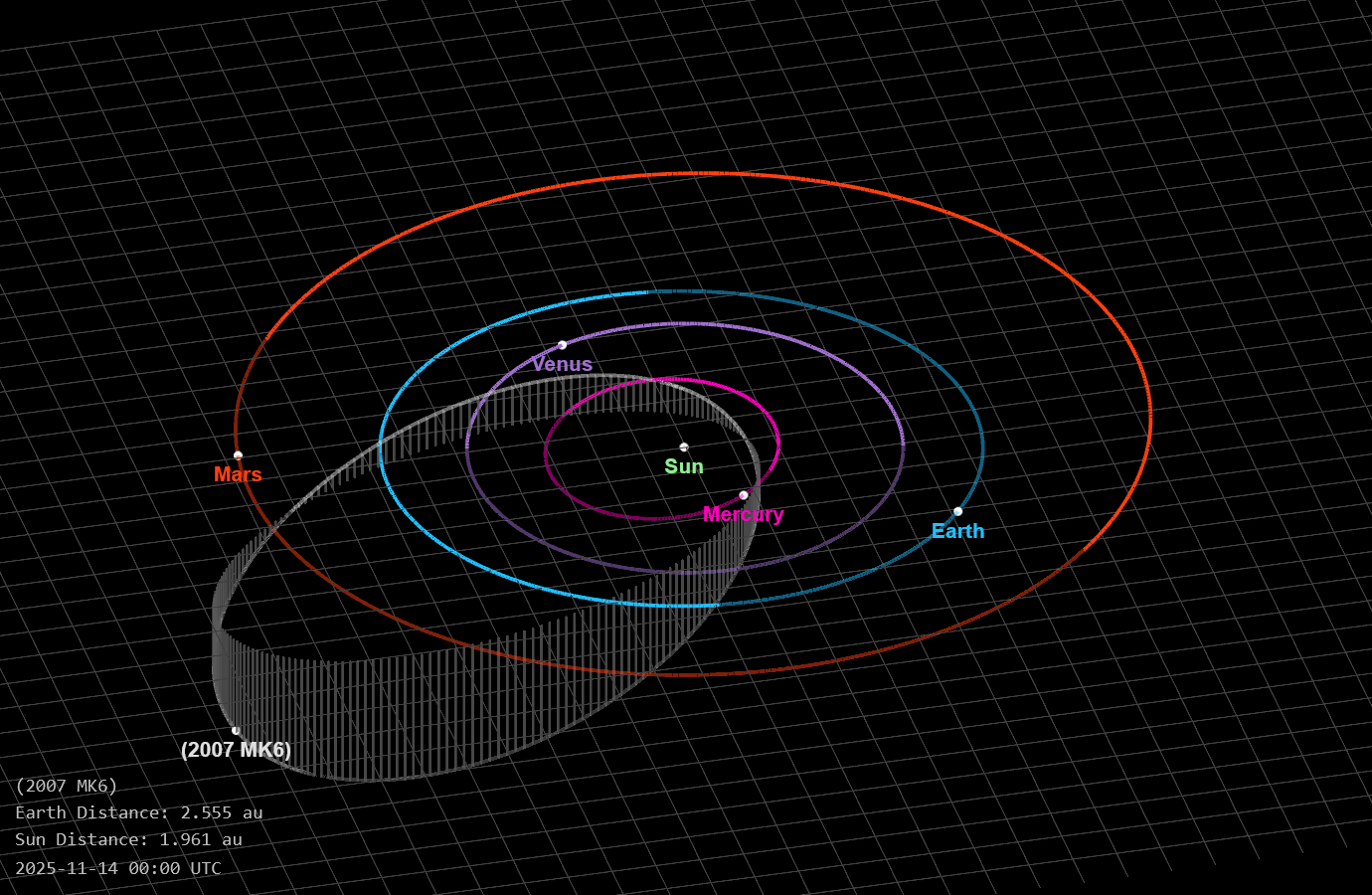
A diagram of 2007 MK_{6}'s highly eccentric orbit in the inner Solar System.

2007 MK_{6} is classified as a near-Earth asteroid (NEA), orbiting the Sun at an average distance—its semi-major axis—of 1.08 astronomical units (AU). Due to its high eccentricity of 0.82, its distance from the Sun varies greatly. At perihelion, it comes within 0.20 AU, closer than Mercury's orbit. At aphelion, it moves as far as 1.97 AU. Since it crosses Earth's orbit and has a semi-major axis greater than 1 AU, it is also classified as an Apollo asteroid. It takes 1.12 years to complete one revolution around the Sun, and its orbit is inclined by 25.12° with respect to the ecliptic plane.

=== Relation to 1566 Icarus ===
2007 MK_{6} forms an asteroid pair with another NEA, 1566 Icarus. Icarus is a 1.44 kilometres (0.89 mi) sized NEA on a highly eccentric orbit, and its orbital properties are similar to those of 2007 MK_{6}. The pair was identified in a 2007 study led by Ohtsuka after surveying NEAs for a potential relation to Icarus. Although the two occasionally encounter Earth and Venus, the effects on their orbits are small enough to maintain a relatively stable secular evolution of their orbital elements. The time of separation of the two asteroids is unknown, but Icarus's classification as a Q-type asteroid, which tend to weather rapidly, places a maximum age of 10 million years (Myr). The parent object of the two asteroids was likely injected into the inner Solar System around that time.

Icarus's rapid rotation period of 2.27 hours lies near the roughly 2.2 hour spin barrier, below which a strengthless rubble pile asteroid would self-destruct due to the centrifugal force. This implies that 2007 MK_{6} may have fissioned from Icarus as long as the parent body was a weakly-bound rubble pile, as is common for kilometer-sized asteroids. Thermal stress could have contributed to the breakup of the pair's parent body, as its very low perihelion would lead to temperatures reaching 527 °C (800 K) at the subsolar point.

== Physical characteristics ==
Assuming 2007 MK_{6} has a geometric albedo similar to Icarus's, it is estimated to be 180 metres (590 ft) in size and no greater than several hundred meters in size.

== See also ==
- List of Mercury-crossing minor planets

Other NEA groups:

- 3200 Phaethon – a highly eccentric asteroid that hosts an asteroid group with (155140) 2005 UD and (225416) 1999 YC
- 2017 SN16 and 2018 RY7 – an asteroid pair currently participating in a 3:5 mean-motion resonance with Venus
