= Qingyang event =

1490 astronomical event in China

Location map

The Qingyang event was a presumed meteor shower or air burst that took place near Qingyang in March or April 1490. The area was at the time part of Shaanxi, but is now in Gansu province. A 1994 study in the journal Meteoritics tentatively explained this event as a meteor air burst.

Historical Chinese accounts of the meteor shower recorded many deaths, although the official Ming dynasty history records the event without reporting the number of victims. In the same year, Asian astronomers coincidentally discovered comet C/1490 Y1, a possible progenitor of the Quadrantid meteor showers.

== Meteor shower ==
At least three surviving Chinese historical records describe a shower of rocks, one stating that "stones fell like rain." Human fatality estimates in these sources range from more than ten thousand people to several tens of thousands of people. The History of Ming (the official history of the Ming dynasty) contains a report of the event, and other journal records which describe the event are also generally considered reliable. However, the History of Ming omits the number of casualties, which therefore has been frequently either doubted or discounted by present-day researchers.

Due to the paucity of detailed information and the lack of surviving meteorites or other physical evidence, researchers have been unable to definitively state the exact nature of the dramatic event, even examining the possible occurrence of severe hail. Kevin Yau of NASA's Jet Propulsion Laboratory and his collaborators have noted several similarities of the Qingyang event to the Tunguska air burst in 1908, which, if it had occurred above a populated area, could have produced many fatalities.

One surviving account records:

Stones fell like rain in the Ch’ing-yang [Qingyang] district. The larger ones were 4 to 5 catties (about 1.5 kg; 3.3 lbs), and the smaller ones were 2 to 3 catties (about 1 kg; 2.2 lbs). Numerous stones rained in Ch'ing-yang. Their sizes were all different. The larger ones were like goose's eggs and the smaller ones were like water-chestnuts. More than 10,000 people were struck dead. All of the people in the city fled to other places.

One source of Chinese astronomical information of celestial events, the Zhongguo gudai tianxiang jilu zongji (Complete collection of records of celestial phenomena in ancient China), records ten works that discuss the March–April 1490 event, including the History of Ming. Additionally, there are records of it in local gazettes and histories of the region. The History of Ming states only that there was a rain of uncountable stones up to the size of goose eggs. The date given was the third lunar month of 1490, which translates as 21 March to 19 April 1490.

== Coincidental comet ==
In 2007 astronomers determined that the annual January Quadrantid meteor shower may have originated with the disintegration of Comet C/1490 Y1, approximately a century after it was first identified in 1490 by Chinese, Japanese, and Korean astronomers. A connection with asteroid (196256) 2003 EH_{1} has also been suggested.

== See also ==
- Asteroid impact avoidance
- B612 Foundation
- Mandate of Heaven
- NEOShield
- Spaceguard
