= (5496) 1973 NA =

Near-Earth asteroid

Discovery
- Discovered by: E. F. Helin
- Discovery site: Palomar Obs.
- Discovery date: 4 July 1973

Designations
- Alternative designations: 1992 OA
- Minor planet category: Apollo · NEO

Orbital characteristics
- Epoch 4 September 2017 (JD 2458000.5)
- Uncertainty parameter 0
- Observation arc: 41.30 yr (15,086 days)
- Aphelion: 3.9837 AU
- Perihelion: 0.8865 AU
- Semi-major axis: 2.4351 AU
- Eccentricity: 0.6360
- Orbital period (sidereal): 3.80 yr (1,388 days)
- Mean anomaly: 240.93°
- Mean motion: 0° 15^{m} 33.84^{s} / day
- Inclination: 68.006°
- Longitude of ascending node: 101.04°
- Argument of perihelion: 118.02°
- Earth MOID: 0.0904 AU

Physical characteristics
- Mean diameter: 1.88 km (calculated)
- Synodic rotation period: 2.855±0.001 h (Note: Skiff (2011) web: rotation period 2.855±0.001 hours with a brightness amplitude of 0.15 mag. Observation rated Quality Code (U) of 3. Summary figures at Collaborative Asteroid Lightcurve Link (CALL) for (5496) 1973 NA)
- Geometric albedo: 0.20 (assumed)
- Spectral type: C/X · S
- Absolute magnitude (H): 16.0

(5496) 1973 NA, is a very eccentric and heavily tilted asteroid, classified as a near-Earth object of the Apollo group, approximately 2 kilometers in diameter. It was discovered on 4 July 1973, by American astronomer Eleanor Helin at the U.S. Palomar Observatory in California. At the time of its discovery, it was the most highly inclined minor planet known to exist. It may be the parent body of the Quadrantids.

== Parent of the Quadrantids ==
1973 NA is a possible parent body of the Quadrantids, a major meteor shower that occurs every January. It may also be just a fragment of the parent or the dormant remains of the parent. Other possible parent bodies are Comet 1491 I and comet 96P/Machholz, as well as (196256) 2003 EH1.

== Orbit and classification ==
The asteroid orbits the Sun at a distance of 0.9–4.0 AU once every 3 years and 10 months (1,388 days). Its orbit has an eccentricity of 0.64 and an inclination of 68° with respect to the ecliptic. No precoveries were taken. The asteroid's observation arc even begins 2 days after its discovery.

The body was also one of the first known near-Earth asteroids. Its discovery happened just two days after it had passed 0.07984 AU (11,900,000 km) from Earth on one of its closest approaches ever computed. It was then tracked for more than a month, but was not seen again until its next close approach in 1992, when it was recovered by the Siding Spring Observatory in Australia. Its minimum orbit intersection distance with Earth is now 0.0904 AU (13,500,000 km).

== Physical characteristics ==
The stony S-type asteroid is also classified as a transitional C/X-type according to observations by the NASA IRTF telescope. A rotational lightcurve for this asteroid was obtained by American astronomer Brian Skiff from photometric observations made in June 2011. Lightcurve analysis gave a well-defined rotation period of 2.855±0.001 hours with a brightness variation of 0.15 magnitude (U=3). The Collaborative Asteroid Lightcurve Link assumes a standard albedo for stony asteroids of 0.20 and calculates a diameter of 1.88 kilometers with an absolute magnitude of 16.0.
