= Vulcanite (disambiguation) =

Vulcanite is a mineral.

Vulcanite may also refer to:

- Vulcanite (hard rubber) (a.k.a. Ebonite), vulcanized rubber
- Vulcanite (artificial stone), artificial stone

== See also ==
- Vulcanization
- Vulcanoid
