= Simon F. Green =

British astronomer

Simon F. Green (born 1959) is an astronomer. He is an emeritus professor in Planetary and Space Science at the Open University. He specializes in the study of asteroids and trans-Neptunian objects, and for a long time worked with the IRAS satellite to detect fast moving objects. In 1983, along with John K. Davies, he discovered the Apollo asteroid 3200 Phaethon.

Asteroid 9831 Simongreen is named after him.
