= John K. Davies (astronomer) =

British astronomer

John Keith Davies (born 1955) is a British astronomer.

Davies was born in Liverpool, England. Whilst at Leicester University, he discovered the source of the Geminid meteors, the asteroid called 3200 Phaethon.

In 2001 he began as Project Scientist for the OPTICON project, an organisation with the goal of integrating all of European astronomers.

== Publications ==
"Astronomy from Space" (Wiley-Praxis Series in Astronomy & Astrophysics), publication date 1997, Wiley-Blackwell, ISBN 9780471962588, hardcover, 346 pages, illustrated

"Cosmic Impact", publication date 1986-09-01, St. Martin's Press, ISBN 978-0-312-17024-0, hardcover, 192 pages, illustrated.
