= 2019 LF6 =

Asteroid

2019 LF_{6}
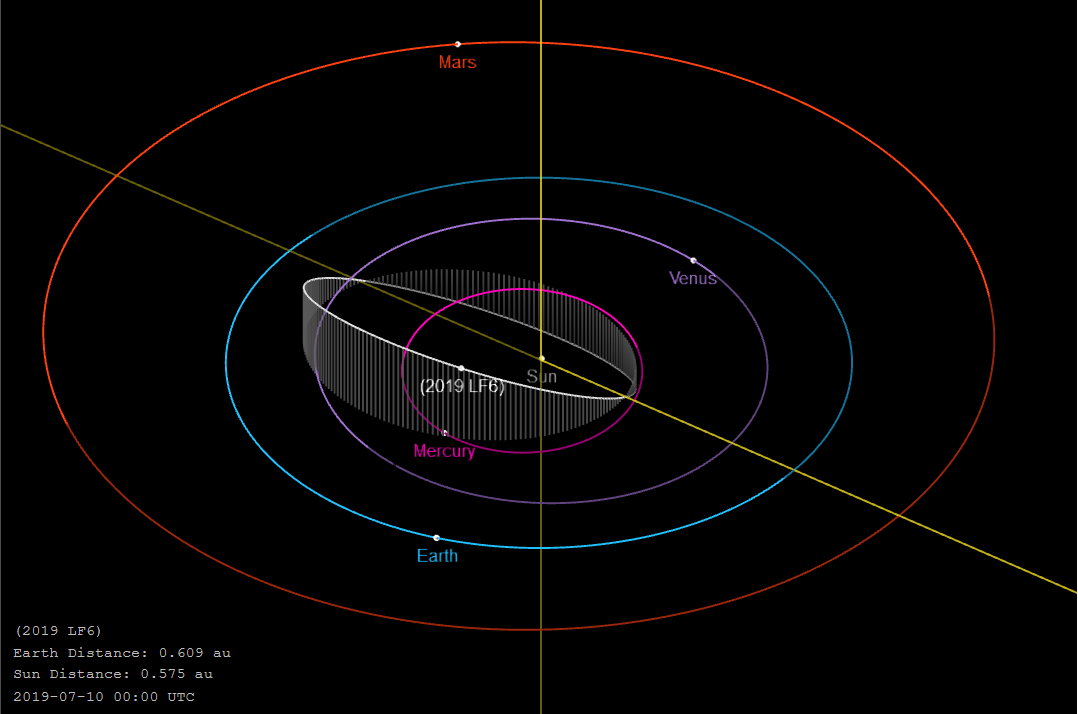
- Highly inclined orbit of 2019 LF_{6} passing within Mercury's orbit, and slightly outside Venus's orbit

Discovery
- Discovered by: Zwicky Transient Facility
- Discovery site: Palomar Obs.
- Discovery date: 10 June 2019 (first observed only)

Designations
- Minor planet category: NEO · Atira

Orbital characteristics
- Epoch 31 May 2020 (JD 2459000.5)
- Uncertainty parameter 3
- Observation arc: 358 days
- Aphelion: 0.7938 AU
- Perihelion: 0.3170 AU
- Semi-major axis: 0.5554 AU
- Eccentricity: 0.42928
- Orbital period (sidereal): 0.41 yr (151.2 d)
- Mean anomaly: 347.653°
- Mean motion: 2° 22^{m} 51.74^{s} / day
- Inclination: 29.506°
- Longitude of ascending node: 179.029°
- Argument of perihelion: 213.779°
- Earth MOID: 0.2608 AU

Physical characteristics
- Mean diameter: 1–2 km (est. at 0.05–0.15)
- Absolute magnitude (H): 17.200±0.398

2019 LF_{6} is a near-Earth object of the Atira group. After 2021 PH27, it has the second-smallest semi-major axis among the known asteroids (0.555 AU), beating the previously-held record of 2019 AQ3. It orbits the Sun in 151 days. Discovered at only 19th magnitude, it is very difficult to see, never getting far from the sun and twilight. It only occasionally brightens above 16th magnitude. Discovery was made using the Zwicky Transient Facility.

2019 LF_{6} orbits the Sun at a distance of 0.3–0.8 AU once every 5 months (151 days; semi-major axis of 0.56 AU). Its orbit has an eccentricity of 0.43 and an unusually high inclination of 30° with respect to the ecliptic. The asteroids 594913 ꞌAylóꞌchaxnim and 2019 AQ3 are the only known asteroids with closer aphelions. The orbital evolution of 2019 AQ_{3} is similar to that of 2019 LF_{6}.
