= 594913 ꞌAylóꞌchaxnim =

First known asteroid of the Vatira population

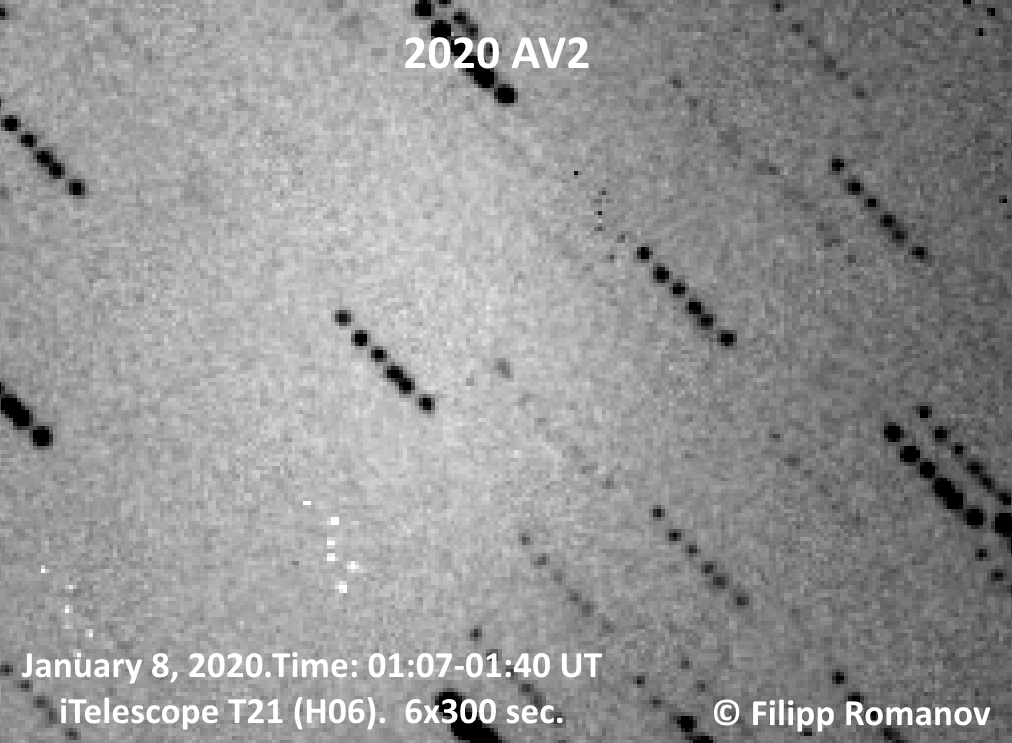
- Long-exposure composite image of ꞌAylóꞌchaxnim (center)

Discovery
- Discovered by: Zwicky Transient Facility
- Discovery site: Palomar Obs.
- Discovery date: 4 January 2020

Designations
- Pronunciation: /aɪˈlɒʔtʃæxnɪm/ Luiseño: [ʔajˈlɔʔt͜ʃaxnɪm]
- Alternative designations: 2020 AV_{2} · ZTF09k5
- Minor planet category: Vatira · Atira · NEO
- Symbol: (astrological)

Orbital characteristics
- Epoch 1 July 2021 (JD 2459396.5)
- Uncertainty parameter 2
- Observation arc: 1.67 yr (609 days)
- Aphelion: 0.6538 AU
- Perihelion: 0.4571 AU
- Semi-major axis: 0.5554 AU
- Eccentricity: 0.17701
- Orbital period (sidereal): 0.41 yr (151.2 d)
- Mean anomaly: 85.295°
- Mean motion: 2° 22^{m} 51.424^{s} / day
- Inclination: 15.868°
- Longitude of ascending node: 6.706°
- Argument of perihelion: 187.330°
- Earth MOID: 0.34694 AU (51.9 million km)
- Mercury MOID: 0.06561 AU
- Venus MOID: 0.07896 AU

Physical characteristics
- Mean diameter: 1.7+0.6 −0.6 km
- Geometric albedo: 0.22 (assumed for S-type asteroids)
Surface temp.	min	mean	max
(approx)	330 K	350 K	395 K
- Spectral type: Sa
- Apparent magnitude: 18.0
- Absolute magnitude (H): 16.17±0.78

594913 ꞌAylóꞌchaxnim (provisional designation 2020 AV_{2}) is a large near-Earth asteroid discovered by the Zwicky Transient Facility on 4 January 2020. It is the first asteroid discovered to have an orbit completely within Venus's orbit, and is thus the first and only known member of the eponymous ꞌAylóꞌchaxnim (informally named Vatira before its discovery) population of Atira-class asteroids. ꞌAylóꞌchaxnim has the smallest known aphelion and third-smallest known semi-major axis among all asteroids. With an absolute magnitude of approximately 16.2, the asteroid is expected to be larger than 1 km in diameter.

== Discovery ==
ꞌAylóꞌchaxnim was discovered by the Zwicky Transient Facility (ZTF) survey at the Palomar Observatory on 4 January 2020, by astronomers Bryce Bolin, Frank Masci, and Quanzhi Ye. The discovery formed part of a campaign for detecting interior-Earth asteroids (Atiras) using the wide-field ZTF camera on the 1.22-meter Samuel Oschin telescope at the Palomar Observatory. The detection of such objects is difficult due to their close proximity to the Sun: asteroids within the orbit of Venus never reach solar elongations greater than 47 degrees, meaning that they are only observable during twilight as the Sun is below the Earth's horizon. Because of this, inner-Venusian asteroids could only be observed within a short time frame, hence why the ZTF camera was used since it can effectively detect transient objects.

At the time of discovery, ꞌAylóꞌchaxnim was located in the constellation Aquarius, (Note: The celestial coordinates of ꞌAylóꞌchaxnim at the time of discovery are 21^{h} 24^{m} 49.90^{s} and −06° 08′ 41.8″. See Aquarius for constellation coordinates.) at an apparent magnitude around 18. The discovery of ꞌAylóꞌchaxnim was reported by astronomer Bryce Bolin, and was subsequently listed on the Minor Planet Center's Near-Earth Object Confirmation Page (NEOCP) on 4 January 2020. Follow-up observations were then conducted at various observatories in order to determine the asteroid's orbit based on its orbital motion. The discovery of the asteroid was then formally announced in a Minor Planet Electronic Circular issued by the MPC on 8 January 2020. Follow-up observations were later conducted in November 2020 by the Palomar and Xingming observatories, reducing ꞌAylóꞌchaxnim's uncertainty parameter to 5.

== Nomenclature ==
Upon discovery, the asteroid was given the internal designation ZTF09k5. The Minor Planet Center (MPC) gave it the provisional designation 2020 AV_{2} on 8 January 2020, after follow-up observations sufficiently determined its orbit. After its orbit had been determined to sufficient precision, the MPC assigned it the permanent number 594913 on 20 September 2021 (M.P.C. 135125). Its name was approved on 8 November 2021. ꞌAylóꞌchaxnim means 'Venus girl' in the indigenous Luiseño language of southern California. (Note: The name is derived from ꞌaylóchax 'morning star' (also 'food left overnight'), which in turn derives (ꞌa-ylócha-x) from yulóchax 'to stay the night, be kept overnight'. The glottal stop in the verb yulóchax occurs automatically (ch becomes ꞌch after a stressed vowel) and is not normally written (Elliot 1999: 15).) The name references the location of the discovery (Palomar Mountain, which is on ancestral Luiseño land) and the fact that ꞌAylóꞌchaxnim is the first discovered asteroid to orbit entirely within the orbit of Venus. Being the prototype of the informally named Vatira class, its name is expected to be used to refer to this newly confirmed population.

== Orbit and classification ==
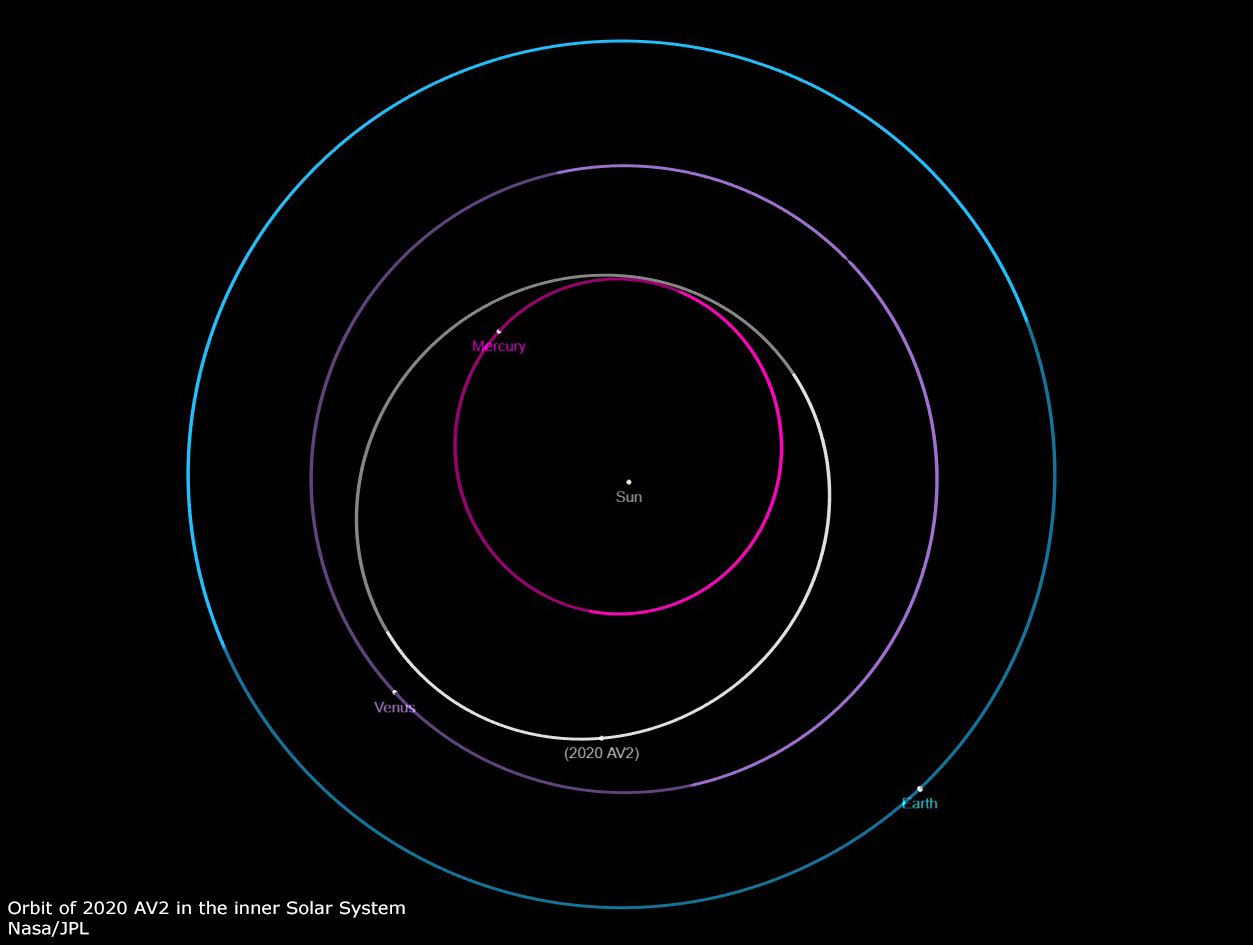
Orbit diagram of ꞌAylóꞌchaxnim, as viewed from the ecliptic pole

ꞌAylóꞌchaxnim is the only asteroid known to have an orbit completely within Venus's orbit. With an aphelion distance of approximately 0.654 astronomical units (AU), it has the smallest known aphelion of all asteroids. In comparison, Venus's average orbital distance from the Sun is 0.723 AU, with a perihelion distance of 0.718 AU. ꞌAylóꞌchaxnim is formally classified as an Atira asteroid by the Minor Planet Center due it having an orbit within that of Earth. However, unlike previously known Atira asteroids, ꞌAylóꞌchaxnim's orbit is contained within that of Venus, thus it falls into the proposed category of Vatira asteroids—a subclass of Atira asteroids with aphelion distances less than Venus's perihelion distance (hence the name: a portmanteau of 'Venus' and 'Atira'). ꞌAylóꞌchaxnim is technically classified as a near-Earth object under the Atira classification, though the asteroid's minimum orbit intersection distance from Earth is 0.346 AU (51.8 million km).

The orbit of ꞌAylóꞌchaxnim is well-secured with an uncertainty parameter of 2. The asteroid orbits the Sun in approximately 151 days (0.41 years), with a semi-major axis of approximately 0.5554 AU. ꞌAylóꞌchaxnim's orbit is close to a 3:2 mean-motion orbital resonance with Venus, meaning that ꞌAylóꞌchaxnim completes approximately three orbits for every two orbits completed by Venus. The orbit of ꞌAylóꞌchaxnim is moderately eccentric, as it approaches only 0.457 AU from the Sun at perihelion, just within Mercury's aphelion distance of 0.467 AU. ꞌAylóꞌchaxnim's orbit is also moderately inclined to the ecliptic by approximately 15.9 degrees. ꞌAylóꞌchaxnim has a smaller orbital eccentricity and inclination compared to the generally expected values for typical Vatira asteroids, which were predicted to have an eccentricity around 0.4 and an inclination around 25 degrees. The asteroid's minimum orbit intersection distance from Mercury and Venus is about 0.066 AU (9.9×10^{6} km) and 0.079 AU (11.8×10^{6} km), respectively.

ꞌAylóꞌchaxnim is approximately tied with 2019 LF6 (0.5553 AU) as having the second-smallest known orbital period and semi-major axis among all asteroids, though 2019 LF_{6} has a slightly smaller semi-major axis. In this case, ꞌAylóꞌchaxnim has the third-smallest known semi-major axis among all asteroids.

=== Orbital dynamics ===
ꞌAylóꞌchaxnim had likely originated from the main asteroid belt, where its orbit was locked in a secular resonance that caused its orbital eccentricity to gradually increase over time, evolving onto an Earth-crossing orbit. Subsequent close encounters with Earth, Venus, and Mercury resulted in gravitational perturbations of the asteroid's orbit, reducing its momentum and causing it to orbit closer to the Sun. Such inward orbital migration is thought to be rare. Near-Earth asteroids transitioning into the Vatira region often have unstable, short-term orbits due to frequent gravitational perturbations by Venus and Mercury. ꞌAylóꞌchaxnim rarely crosses the orbits of Mercury and Venus, which reduces the number of close encounters with either planet that would otherwise perturb ꞌAylóꞌchaxnim's orbit. Nevertheless its orbit is likely to be stable for less than a million years, unless it is on (or enters soon) a nearby 3:2 mean-motion resonance with Venus, which could extend its stability to a few million years.

Dynamical modeling of ꞌAylóꞌchaxnim's orbit show that the most likely scenario for its orbital evolution is that ꞌAylóꞌchaxnim's orbit will oscillate for several millions of years before gravitational perturbations lead to the asteroid's eventual collision with a planet, most likely Venus. At 140 thousand years from the present, ꞌAylóꞌchaxnim's aphelion distance will exceed Venus's perihelion distance, as a result of the combined effects of the Kozai resonance and gravitational perturbations. Within the Vatira region, the Kozai resonance causes the orbital inclinations and eccentricities of asteroids to oscillate over several millions of years. As a result, Vatira asteroids can become Atira-class asteroids and vice versa over time, and can cross the orbits of Mercury and Venus during these orbital oscillations. The Kozai resonance often disrupts the orbits of Vatira asteroids, albeit it can also lead to orbital stability for some unperturbed Vatira asteroids. At about 1.2 million years from the present, ꞌAylóꞌchaxnim will leave the Vatira region and will transition onto a Mercury-crossing orbit, with its perihelion oscillating around Mercury's aphelion distance before decoupling from the planet's orbit at about 2.1 million years.

After decoupling from Mercury's orbit, ꞌAylóꞌchaxnim was shown to oscillate between an Atira-type orbit (Q < 0.983 AU) and an Earth-crossing Aten-type orbit (Q > 0.983 AU), in which the asteroid's aphelion oscillates around Earth's perihelion distance of 0.983 AU. About 740 thousand years afterward, ꞌAylóꞌchaxnim will likely return to its Mercury-crossing orbit, though gravitational perturbations by Mercury and Venus will scatter it onto an Earth-crossing orbit once more before colliding with either planet. After 10 million years from the present, ꞌAylóꞌchaxnim will have most likely collided with Venus.

Modeling of the observational selection effects of the Zwicky Transient Facility survey shows a small probability of it detecting ꞌAylóꞌchaxnim based on the current NEO model. The low probability of detection may imply an additional source of ꞌAylóꞌchaxnim asteroids in the inner Solar System such as within the orbit of Mercury.

== Physical characteristics ==
ꞌAylóꞌchaxnim is estimated to have an absolute magnitude (H) of approximately 16.2. The medium diameter of ꞌAylóꞌchaxnim is expected to be larger than 1 km (0.62 mi). Assuming that the albedo is between 0.25 and 0.05, its diameter should be around 1–3 km, respectively. Near-Earth asteroid population models predict that at least one asteroid of this size has an orbit within that of Venus, implying that ꞌAylóꞌchaxnim could be one of the largest members of the Vatira population.

Visible and near-infrared spectroscopy by the Roque de los Muchachos Observatory in 2020 suggests that ꞌAylóꞌchaxnim has a reddish surface that is olivine-rich, based on the presence of a 1 μm absorption feature characteristic of S-type asteroids. The abundance of olivine in the surface of ꞌAylóꞌchaxnim suggests that it could be a mantle asteroid formed as a fragment from the rocky mantles of large, internally differentiated bodies. The absorption features in ꞌAylóꞌchaxnim's spectrum appear to be intermediate between the S-type and A-type spectral classes, hence it is classified as an Sa-type asteroid. Assuming an average albedo of 0.22 for S-type asteroids, ꞌAylóꞌchaxnim's diameter can be constrained to approximately 1.5 km (0.93 mi).

== See also ==
- Vulcanoids – a hypothetical population of asteroids within Mercury's orbit
- 2019 AQ3, a dynamically-changing Atira asteroid that may have once been an ꞌAylóꞌchaxnim asteroid
- 524522 Zoozve, a temporary quasi-satellite of Venus
- 2013 ND15, the first known Venus trojan
