= C/1490 Y1 =

Periodic comet

Discovery
- Discovery site: China
- Discovery date: 31 December 1490

Designations
- Alternative designations: 1491 I

Orbital characteristics
- Epoch: 26 December 1490 (JD 2265638.47)
- Observation arc: 22 days
- Number of observations: 3
- Aphelion: (Lee et al.) 5.32 AU; (JPL) not defined
- Perihelion: (Lee et al.) 0.769 AU; (JPL) 0.738 AU
- Semi-major axis: (Lee et al.) 3.040 AU; (JPL) not defined
- Eccentricity: (Lee et al.) 0.75; (JPL) 1.0
- Orbital period: (Lee et al.) 5.30 years; (JPL) not defined
- Inclination: (Lee et al.) 70.2°; (JPL) 51.6°
- Longitude of ascending node: (Lee et al.) 283°; (JPL) 296°
- Argument of periapsis: (Lee et al.) 164°; (JPL) 130°
- Last perihelion: 24 December 1490 (observed)
- Next perihelion: Uncertain (Presumed periodic)

Physical characteristics
- Apparent magnitude: 5.4 (1491 apparition)

C/1490 Y1 is a comet that was recorded and observed across East Asia, particularly China and Korea, from December 1490 to February 1491. It is believed to be the parent body of the Quadrantids meteor shower.

== Orbit ==
John Russell Hind, Benjamin Peirce, and Ichiro Hasegawa made the initial orbital calculations for the comet, which all resulted in a parabolic trajectory around the Sun. In 2009, Kyu-Won Lee and his colleagues calculated that C/1490 Y1 is a Jupiter-family comet with a 5.3-year orbit around the Sun, with the asteroid (196256) 2003 EH1 might even be related to it.

== See also ==
- (196256) 2003 EH1
