= Vulcanoid =

Hypothetical asteroids orbiting close to the Sun

The zone, represented by the orange region, in which vulcanoids may exist, compared with the orbits of Mercury, Venus and Earth

The vulcanoids are a hypothetical population of asteroids that orbit the Sun in a dynamically stable zone inside the orbit of the planet Mercury. They are named after the hypothetical planet Vulcan, which was proposed on the basis of irregularities in Mercury's orbit that were later found to be explained by general relativity. So far, no vulcanoids have been discovered, and it is not yet clear whether any exist.

If they do exist, the vulcanoids could easily evade detection because they would be very small and near the bright glare of the Sun. Due to their proximity to the Sun, searches from the ground can only be carried out during twilight or solar eclipses. Any vulcanoids must be between about 100 metres (330 ft) and 6 kilometres (3.7 mi) in diameter and are probably located in nearly circular orbits near the outer edge of the gravitationally stable zone between the Sun and Mercury. These should be distinguished from Atira asteroids, which may have perihelia within the orbit of Mercury, but whose aphelia extends as far as the orbits of Venus or within Earth's orbital path. Because they cross the orbit of Mercury, these bodies are not classed as vulcanoids.

The vulcanoids, should they be found, may provide scientists with material from the first period of planet formation, as well as insights into the conditions prevalent in the early Solar System. Although every other gravitationally stable region in the Solar System has been found to contain objects, non-gravitational forces (such as the Yarkovsky effect) or the influence of a migrating planet in the early stages of the Solar System's development may have depleted this area of any asteroids that may have been there.

== History and observation ==
Celestial bodies interior to the orbit of Mercury have been hypothesized, and searched for, for centuries. The German astronomer Christoph Scheiner thought he had seen small bodies passing in front of the Sun in 1611, but these were later shown to be sunspots. In the 1850s, Urbain Le Verrier made detailed calculations of Mercury's orbit and found a small discrepancy in the planet's perihelion precession from predicted values. He postulated that the gravitational influence of a small planet or ring of asteroids within the orbit of Mercury would explain the deviation. Shortly afterward, an amateur astronomer named Edmond Lescarbault claimed to have seen Le Verrier's proposed planet transit the Sun. The new planet was quickly named Vulcan but was never seen again, and the anomalous behaviour of Mercury's orbit was explained by Einstein's general theory of relativity in 1915. The vulcanoids take their name from this hypothetical planet. What Lescarbault saw was probably another sunspot.

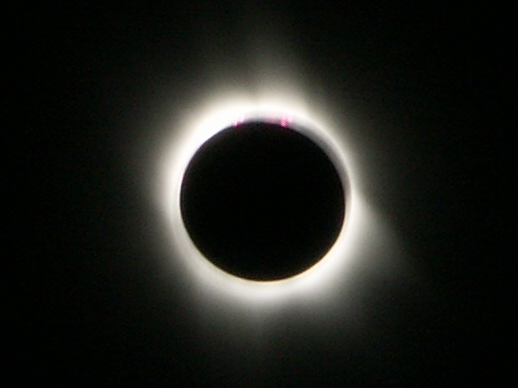
Total solar eclipses provide an opportunity to search for vulcanoids from the ground.

Vulcanoids, should they exist, would be difficult to detect due to the strong glare of the nearby Sun, and ground-based searches can only be carried out during twilight or during solar eclipses. Several searches during eclipses were conducted in the early 1900s, which did not reveal any vulcanoids, and observations during eclipses remain a common search method. Conventional telescopes cannot be used to search for them because the nearby Sun could damage their optics.

In 1998, astronomers analysed data from the SOHO spacecraft's LASCO instrument, which is a set of three coronagraphs. The data taken between January and May of that year did not show any vulcanoids brighter than magnitude 7. This corresponds to a diameter of about 60 kilometres (37 mi), assuming the asteroids have an albedo similar to that of Mercury. In particular, a large minor planet at a distance of 0.18 AU, predicted by the theory of scale relativity, was ruled out.

Later attempts to detect the vulcanoids involved taking astronomical equipment above the interference of Earth's atmosphere, to heights where the twilight sky is darker and clearer than on the ground. In 2000, planetary scientist Alan Stern performed surveys of the vulcanoid zone using a Lockheed U-2 spy plane. The flights were conducted at a height of 21,300 metres (69,900 ft) during twilight. In 2002, he and Dan Durda performed similar observations on an F-18 fighter jet. They made three flights over the Mojave Desert at an altitude of 15,000 metres (49,000 ft) and made observations with the Southwest Universal Imaging System—Airborne (SWUIS-A).

Even at these heights the atmosphere is still present and can interfere with searches for vulcanoids. In 2004, a sub-orbital spaceflight was attempted in order to get a camera above Earth's atmosphere. A Black Brant rocket was launched from White Sands, New Mexico, on January 16, carrying a powerful camera named VulCam, on a ten-minute flight. This flight reached an altitude of 274,000 metres (899,000 ft) and took over 50,000 images. None of the images revealed any vulcanoids, but there were technical problems.

Searches of NASA's two STEREO spacecraft data have failed to detect any vulcanoid asteroids. It is doubtful that there are any vulcanoids larger than 5.7 kilometres (3.5 mi) in diameter.

The MESSENGER space probe took a few images of the outer regions of the vulcanoid zone; however, its opportunities were limited because its instruments had to be pointed away from the Sun at all times to avoid damage. Before its demise in 2015, however, the craft failed to produce substantial evidence on vulcanoids.

== Orbit ==
A vulcanoid is an asteroid in a stable orbit with a semi-major axis less than that of Mercury (i.e. 0.387 AU). This does not include objects like sungrazing comets, which, although they have perihelia inside the orbit of Mercury, have far greater semi-major axes.

The vulcanoids are thought to exist in a gravitationally stable band inside the orbit of Mercury, at distances of 0.06–0.21 AU from the Sun. All other similarly stable regions in the Solar System have been found to contain objects, although non-gravitational forces such as radiation pressure, Poynting–Robertson drag and the Yarkovsky effect may have depleted the vulcanoid area of its original contents. There may be no more than 300–900 vulcanoids larger than 1 kilometre (0.62 mi) in radius remaining, if any. A 2020 study found that the Yarkovsky–O'Keefe–Radzievskii–Paddack effect is strong enough to destroy hypothetical vulcanoids as large as 100 km in radius on timescales far smaller than the age of the Solar System; would-be vulcanoid asteroids were found to be steadily spun up by the YORP effect until they rotationally fission into smaller bodies, which occurs repeatedly until the debris is small enough to be pushed out of the vulcanoid region by the Yarkovsky effect; this would explain why no vulcanoids have been observed. The gravitational stability of the vulcanoid zone is due in part to the fact that there is only one neighbouring planet. In that respect it can be compared to the Kuiper belt.

The outer edge of the vulcanoid zone is approximately 0.21 AU from the Sun. Objects more distant than this are unstable due to interactions with Mercury and would be perturbed into Mercury-crossing orbits on timescales of the order of 100 million years. (Some definitions would nonetheless include such unstable objects as vulcanoids as long as their current orbits lie completely interior to that of Mercury.) The inner edge is not sharply defined: objects closer than 0.06 AU are particularly susceptible to Poynting–Robertson drag and the Yarkovsky effect, and even out to 0.09 AU vulcanoids would have temperatures of 1,000 K or more, which is hot enough for evaporation of rocks to become the limiting factor in their lifetime.

The maximum possible volume of the vulcanoid zone is very small compared to that of the asteroid belt. Collisions between objects in the vulcanoid zone would be frequent and highly energetic, tending to lead to the destruction of the objects. The most favourable location for vulcanoids is probably in circular orbits near the outer edge of the vulcanoid zone. Vulcanoids are unlikely to have inclinations of more than about 10° to the ecliptic. Mercury trojans, asteroids trapped in Mercury's Lagrange points, are also possible.

== Physical characteristics ==
Any vulcanoids that exist must be relatively small. Previous searches, particularly from the STEREO spacecraft, rule out asteroids larger than 6 kilometres (3.7 mi) in diameter. The minimum size is about 100 metres (330 ft); particles smaller than 0.2 μm are strongly repulsed by radiation pressure, and objects smaller than 70 m would be drawn into the Sun by Poynting–Robertson drag. Between these upper and lower limits, a population of asteroids between 1 kilometre (0.62 mi) and 6 kilometres (3.7 mi) in diameter is thought to be possible. They would be almost hot enough to glow red hot.

It is thought that the vulcanoids would be very rich in elements with a high melting point, such as iron and nickel. They are unlikely to possess a regolith because such fragmented material heats and cools more rapidly, and is affected more strongly by the Yarkovsky effect, than solid rock. Vulcanoids are probably similar to Mercury in colour and albedo, and may contain material left over from the earliest stages of the Solar System's formation.

There is evidence that Mercury was struck by a large object relatively late in its development, a collision which stripped away much of Mercury's crust and mantle, and explaining the thinness of Mercury's mantle compared to the mantles of the other terrestrial planets. If such an impact occurred, much of the resulting debris might still be orbiting the Sun in the vulcanoid zone.

== Significance ==
Vulcanoids, being an entirely new class of celestial bodies, would be interesting in their own right, but discovering whether or not they exist would yield insights into the formation and evolution of the Solar System. If they exist, they might contain material left over from the earliest period of planet formation, and help determine the conditions under which the terrestrial planets, particularly Mercury, formed. In particular, if vulcanoids exist or did exist in the past, they would represent an additional population of impactors that have affected no other planet but Mercury, making that planet's surface appear older than it actually is. If vulcanoids are found not to exist, this would place different constraints on planet formation and suggest that other processes have been at work in the inner Solar System, such as planetary migration clearing out the area.

== See also ==
- 594913 ꞌAylóꞌchaxnim (the only known asteroid always within Venus' orbit)
- 2021 PH27, an asteroid in the Atira group with the smallest semi-major axis among asteroids
- Atira asteroid (asteroids always within Earth's orbit)
- Groups of minor planets
- Kreutz sungrazer
- List of hypothetical Solar System objects
- List of Mercury-crossing minor planets
- Vulcan (hypothetical planet)
