= (155140) 2005 UD =

Eccentric near-Earth asteroid

Discovery
- Discovered by: Catalina Sky Srvy.
- Discovery site: Catalina Stn.
- Discovery date: 22 October 2005

Designations
- Minor planet category: NEO · Apollo

Orbital characteristics
- Epoch 1 July 2020 (JD 2459396.5)
- Uncertainty parameter 0
- Observation arc: 38.76 yr (14,157 days)
- Earliest precovery date: 11 November 1982
- Aphelion: 2.387 AU
- Perihelion: 0.1629 AU
- Semi-major axis: 1.275 AU
- Eccentricity: 0.8722
- Orbital period (sidereal): 1.44 yr (525.8 days)
- Mean anomaly: 1.976°
- Mean motion: 0° 41^{m} 5.026^{s} / day
- Inclination: 28.660°
- Longitude of ascending node: 19.714°
- Argument of perihelion: 207.603°
- Earth MOID: 0.07759 AU (11,607,000 km)
- Mercury MOID: 0.09496 AU (14,206,000 km)
- Venus MOID: 0.07997 AU (11,963,000 km)
- Mars MOID: 0.04058 AU (6,071,000 km)

Physical characteristics
- Mean diameter: 1.28±0.02 km
- Synodic rotation period: 5.23400+0.00004 −0.00001 h
- Pole ecliptic longitude: 285.8°+1.1° −5.3°
- Pole ecliptic latitude: −25.8°+5.3° −12.5°
- Geometric albedo: 0.14±0.02
- Spectral type: C
- Apparent magnitude: 17.0 (discovery)
- Absolute magnitude (H): 17.22±0.03; 17.51±0.02; 17.42

(155140) 2005 UD is an asteroid on an eccentric orbit, classified as a near-Earth object of the Apollo group. It was discovered on 22 October 2005, by the Catalina Sky Survey at the Catalina Station in Arizona, United States. 2005 UD is thought to be a possible fragment of 3200 Phaethon due to its similar orbit, although it is not dynamically associated with the Geminid meteor stream produced by Phaethon.

Due to 2005 UD's highly eccentric orbit, it experiences extreme temperature variations up to 975 K (702 °C; 1,295 °F) at perihelion, leading to thermal fracturing of its surface regolith and ejection of dust particles. However, no activity from 2005 UD has been observed as of yet, though it has been suspected that it could be the inactive parent body of the Daytime Sextantids meteor shower. 2005 UD and Phaethon share a bluish surface color at visible wavelengths, but differ at near-infrared wavelengths where 2005 UD appears redder than Phaethon.

2005 UD passed 0.0558 AU (8.35 million km) from Mars on 20 July 2024.

Potential Family Members
Object	Size	Earth MOID (AU)	Perihelion (AU)	Mars MOID (AU)
3200 Phaethon	6 km	0.02 AU (3.0 million km)	0.14 AU (21 million km)	0.14 AU (21 million km)
(155140) 2005 UD	1.3 km	0.08 AU (12 million km)	0.16 AU (24 million km)	0.04 AU (6.0 million km)
(225416) 1999 YC	1.7 km	0.25 AU (37 million km)	0.24 AU (36 million km)	0.10 AU (15 million km)

== See also ==
- Active asteroid
- (196256) 2003 EH1, a suspected extinct comet and proposed parent body of the Quadrantids meteor shower
- (225416) 1999 YC, another fragment of 3200 Phaethon
