= 2018 RY7 =

Small near-Earth object of the Apollo group

2018 RY_{7}
Discovery
- Discovered by: MLS; M. B. Africano
- Discovery site: Mount Lemmon Obs.
- Discovery date: 14 September 2018 (first observed only)

Designations
- Minor planet category: NEO · Apollo; Earth crosser

Orbital characteristics
- Epoch 27 April 2019 (JD 2458600.5)
- Uncertainty parameter 4
- Observation arc: 89 days
- Aphelion: 1.1656 AU
- Perihelion: 0.8668 AU
- Semi-major axis: 1.0162 AU
- Eccentricity: 0.1470
- Orbital period (sidereal): 1.02 yr (374 d)
- Mean anomaly: 80.480°
- Mean motion: 0° 57^{m} 43.92^{s} / day
- Inclination: 13.351°
- Longitude of ascending node: 2.8171°
- Argument of perihelion: 136.88°
- Earth MOID: 0.0938 AU (36.5424 LD)

Physical characteristics
- Mean diameter: 23–103 m (est.)^{[a]}
- Absolute magnitude (H): 24.4

2018 RY_{7} is a small near-Earth object of the Apollo group. It is currently trapped in a 3:5 mean motion resonance with Venus. The object was first observed on 14 September 2018, by astronomer B. M. Africano with the Mount Lemmon Survey at Mount Lemmon Observatory, Arizona, United States.

== Orbit and physical properties ==
The asteroid's orbit determination is in need of some improvement. It orbits the Sun at a distance of 0.87–1.17 AU once every 374 days (semi-major axis of 1.016 AU). Its orbit has an eccentricity of 0.1470 and an inclination of 13.35° with respect to the ecliptic. It is a member of Apollo dynamical class in both the JPL Small-Body Database and the Minor Planet Center. Apollo asteroids are Earth-crossing asteroids.

=== False binary ===
2018 RY_{7} is currently trapped in a 3:5 mean motion resonance with Venus and follows an orbit very similar to that of 2017 SN16. This pair of near-Earth objects show the highest observed level of dynamical coherence among the NEO-population.

== Physical characteristics ==
2018 RY_{7} has an absolute magnitude of 24.4 which gives a calculated mean diameter between 23 and 103 meters for an assumed geometric albedo of 0.60 and 0.03, respectively.

== Notes ==
- This is assuming an albedo of 0.60 and 0.03, respectively.
