= (225416) 1999 YC =

Near-Earth Asteroid

Discovery
- Discovered by: LINEAR
- Discovery site: Lincoln Lab's ETS
- Discovery date: 17 December 1999

Designations
- Designation: (225416) 1999 YC
- Minor planet category: Apollo; NEO; Mercury-crosser

Orbital characteristics
- Epoch 21 November 2025 (JD 2461000.5)
- Uncertainty parameter 0
- Observation arc: 9,199 d (25.19 yr)
- Aphelion: 2.6022 AU
- Perihelion: 0.2414 AU
- Semi-major axis: 1.4218 AU
- Eccentricity: 0.8302
- Orbital period (sidereal): 619 d (1.69 yr)
- Mean anomaly: 70.92°
- Mean motion: 0° 34^{m} 52.68^{s} / day
- Inclination: 38.263°
- Longitude of ascending node: 64.75°
- Argument of perihelion: 156.45°
- Earth MOID: 0.24851 AU

Physical characteristics
- Mean diameter: 1.651 ± 0.175 km
- Synodic rotation period: 4.531 h 4.4950 ± 0.0010 h
- Albedo: 0.094 ± 0.027
- Spectral type: C
- Absolute magnitude (H): 17.36

(225416) 1999 YC is a large near-Earth asteroid of the Apollo group. The asteroid was discovered by astronomers at the Lincoln Near-Earth Asteroid Research at the Lincoln Laboratory Experimental Test Site.

1999 YC has been suggested to be a fragment of 3200 Phaethon. The asteroid does not appear to be a member of the Phaethon-Geminid complex.

== Orbit and classification ==
1999 YC orbits the sun on a highly eccentric orbit at a distance between 0.24 AU and 2.60 AU, about every 1.7 years. Its perihelion is within the orbit of Mercury, making the asteroid a Mercury-crosser. The asteroid is an Apollo asteroid, which means its perihelion is within Earth's orbit and has a semi-major axis larger than 1 AU. Despite 1999 YC's large size, the asteroid is not considered to be a potentially hazardous object due to its minimum orbital intersection distance being 0.25 AU, greater than the 0.05 AU maximum needed.

1999 YC's observation arc begins with a precovery taken at the Fred Lawrence Whipple Observatory on 27 November 1999, 20 days before the official discovery observation made by LINEAR.

== Physical characteristics ==
1999 YC is a C-type asteroid.

Measurements from WISE have measured the asteroid's albedo to be between 0.067 and 0.121, corresponding to a size of between 1.5 and 1.8 kilometers.

== Formation ==
Like most asteroids, it is believed to have formed from the primordial solar nebula as fragments of planetesimals—material in the early Solar System that was not massive enough to become a planet.

== See also ==
- (155140) 2005 UD, another fragment of 3200 Phaethon
- Geminids
