= 2017 SN16 =

Sub-kilometer asteroid

2017 SN_{16}
Discovery
- Discovered by: A. R. Gibbs; Mount Lemmon Srvy.
- Discovery site: Mount Lemmon Obs.
- Discovery date: 24 September 2017 (first observed only)

Designations
- Minor planet category: NEO · Apollo

Orbital characteristics
- Epoch 27 April 2019 (JD 2458600.5)
- Uncertainty parameter 1
- Observation arc: 1.07 yr (391 d)
- Aphelion: 1.1640 AU
- Perihelion: 0.8683 AU
- Semi-major axis: 1.0161 AU
- Eccentricity: 0.1455
- Orbital period (sidereal): 1.02 yr (374 d)
- Mean anomaly: 77.918°
- Mean motion: 0° 57^{m} 43.92^{s} / day
- Inclination: 13.383°
- Longitude of ascending node: 2.7324°
- Argument of perihelion: 136.98°
- Earth MOID: 0.0928 AU (36.2 LD)

Physical characteristics
- Mean diameter: 58 m (est. at 0.25); 130 m (est. at 0.05)
- Absolute magnitude (H): 23.3

2017 SN_{16} is a sub-kilometer asteroid, classified as a near-Earth object of the Apollo group, approximately 90 meters (300 feet) in diameter. The object was first observed on 24 September 2017, by cometary discoverer Alex Gibbs with the Mount Lemmon Survey at Mount Lemmon Observatory, Arizona, in the United States. It forms an asteroid pair with 2018 RY7 and is currently trapped in a 3:5 mean motion resonance with Venus.

== Orbit and classification ==
2017 SN_{16} is a member of the Apollo asteroids, which cross the orbit of Earth. Apollo's are the largest group of near-Earth objects with nearly 10 thousand known objects.

The object orbits the Sun at a distance of 0.87–1.17 AU once every 374 days (semi-major axis of 1.02 AU). Its orbit has an eccentricity of 0.15 and an inclination of 13° with respect to the ecliptic. It has a minimum orbital intersection distance with Earth of 13,900,000 km (0.0928 AU), which translates into 36.2 lunar distances (LD). The body's observation arc begins with its first observation at Mount Lemmon in September 2017.

=== Asteroid pair ===
2017 SN_{16} is currently trapped in a 3:5 mean motion resonance with Venus and follows an orbit very similar to that of 2018 RY7. They form a pair of asteroids which at some point in the past had very small relative velocities (in the order of only a few meters per second), and may represent a former binary system where the two bodies became gravitationally unbound – by a YORP-induced fission, for example – and subsequently followed separate orbits around the Sun. Other pairs may have been formed from collisional breakup of a parent body. Both 2017 SN_{16} and 2018 RY_{7} shows the highest observed level of dynamical coherence among the population of near-Earth objects.

== Numbering and naming ==
This minor planet has neither been numbered nor named.

== Physical characteristics ==
2017 SN_{16} has an absolute magnitude of 23.3 which gives a calculated mean diameter between 58 and 130 meters for an assumed geometric albedo of 0.25 and 0.05, respectively.
