= 2019 AQ3 =

Atira asteroid

2019 AQ_{3}
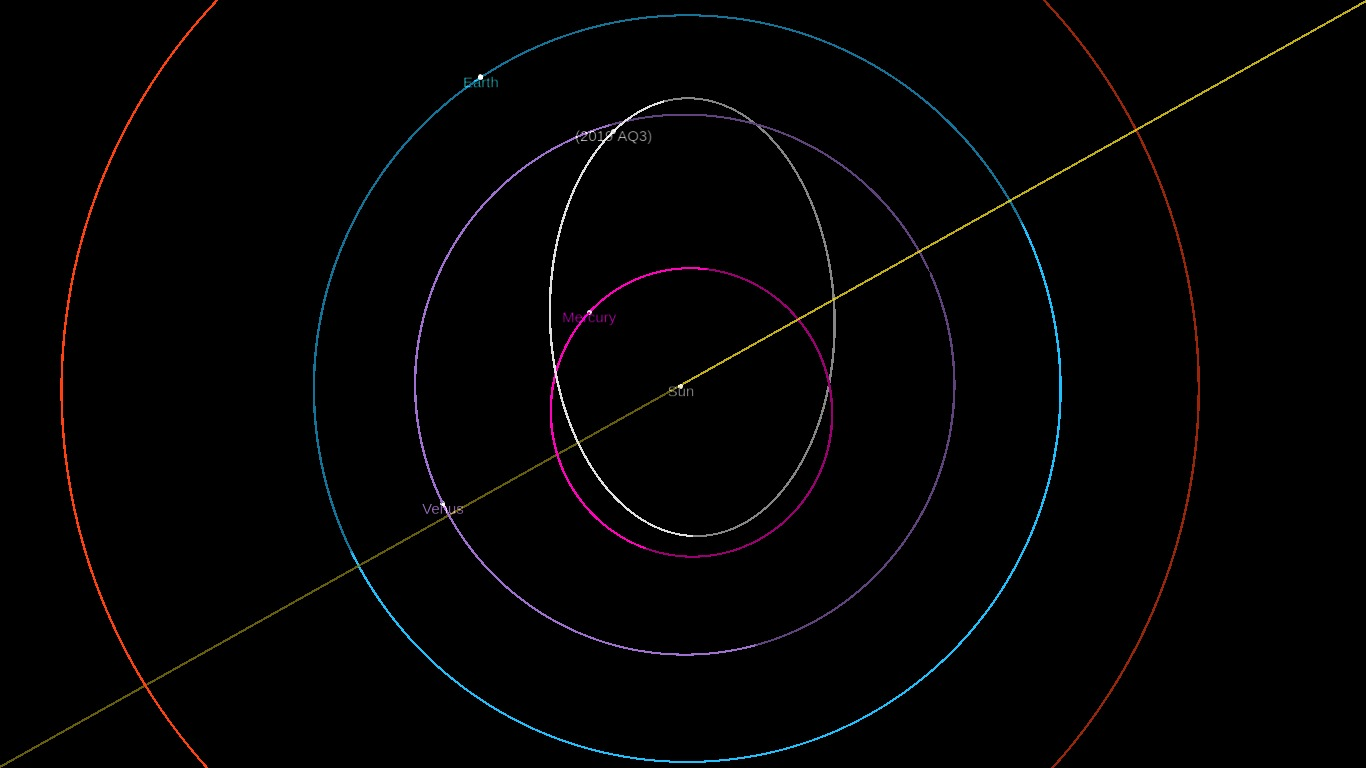
- Orbital diagram of 2019 AQ_{3}, as viewed from the ecliptic pole

Discovery
- Discovered by: Zwicky Transient Facility
- Discovery site: Palomar Obs.
- Discovery date: 4 January 2019 (first observed only)

Designations
- Minor planet category: NEO · Atira

Orbital characteristics
- Epoch 27 April 2019 (JD 2460200.5)
- Uncertainty parameter 1
- Observation arc: 8.20 yr (2,296 d)
- Aphelion: 0.7737 AU
- Perihelion: 0.4037 AU
- Semi-major axis: 0.5887 AU
- Eccentricity: 0.3143
- Orbital period (sidereal): 164.97 days
- Mean anomaly: 10.152°
- Mean motion: 2° 10^{m} 55.92^{s} / day
- Inclination: 47.220°
- Longitude of ascending node: 64.4807°
- Argument of perihelion: 163.157°
- Earth MOID: 0.2267 AU (88.22 LD)
- Mercury MOID: 0.0549 AU
- Venus MOID: 0.0384 AU

Physical characteristics
- Mean diameter: 1+ km (est.); 0.9–2.0 km (at 0.05–0.25); 1.4 km (est. at 0.08)
- Absolute magnitude (H): 17.4

2019 AQ_{3} is an inclined near-Earth object of the small Atira group from the innermost region of the Solar System, estimated to measure 1.4 kilometers (0.9 miles) in diameter. Among the hundreds of thousands known asteroids, 2019 AQ_{3}'s orbit was thought to have likely the smallest semi-major axis (0.589 AU) and aphelion (0.77 AU), that is, the orbit's average distance and farthest point from the Sun, respectively. The object was first observed on 4 January 2019, by astronomers at Palomar's Zwicky Transient Facility in California, with recovered images dating back to 2015.

The record for smallest semi-major axis was beaten by another asteroid, 2019 LF6, with 0.555 AU.

== Orbit and classification ==
Orbit of 2019 AQ_{3}

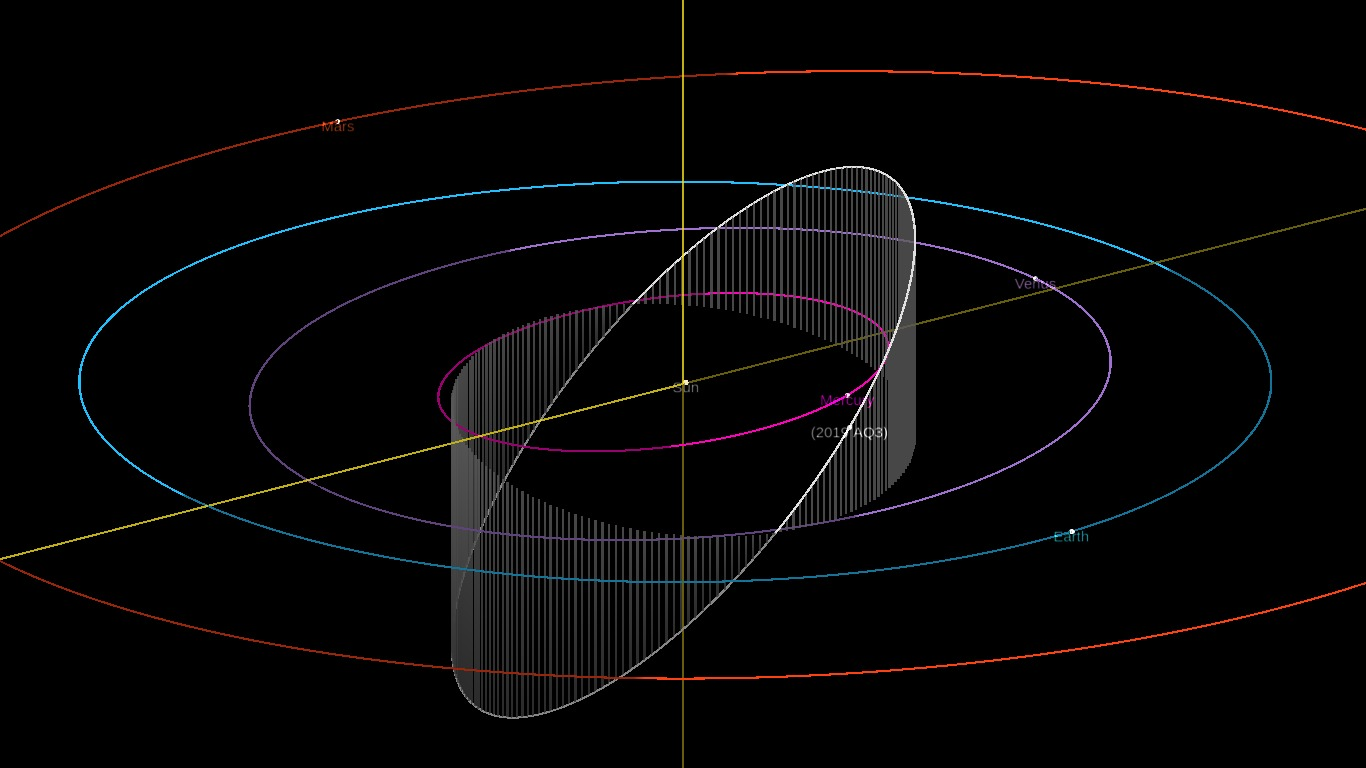
viewed from roughly the ascending and descending nodes of the orbit

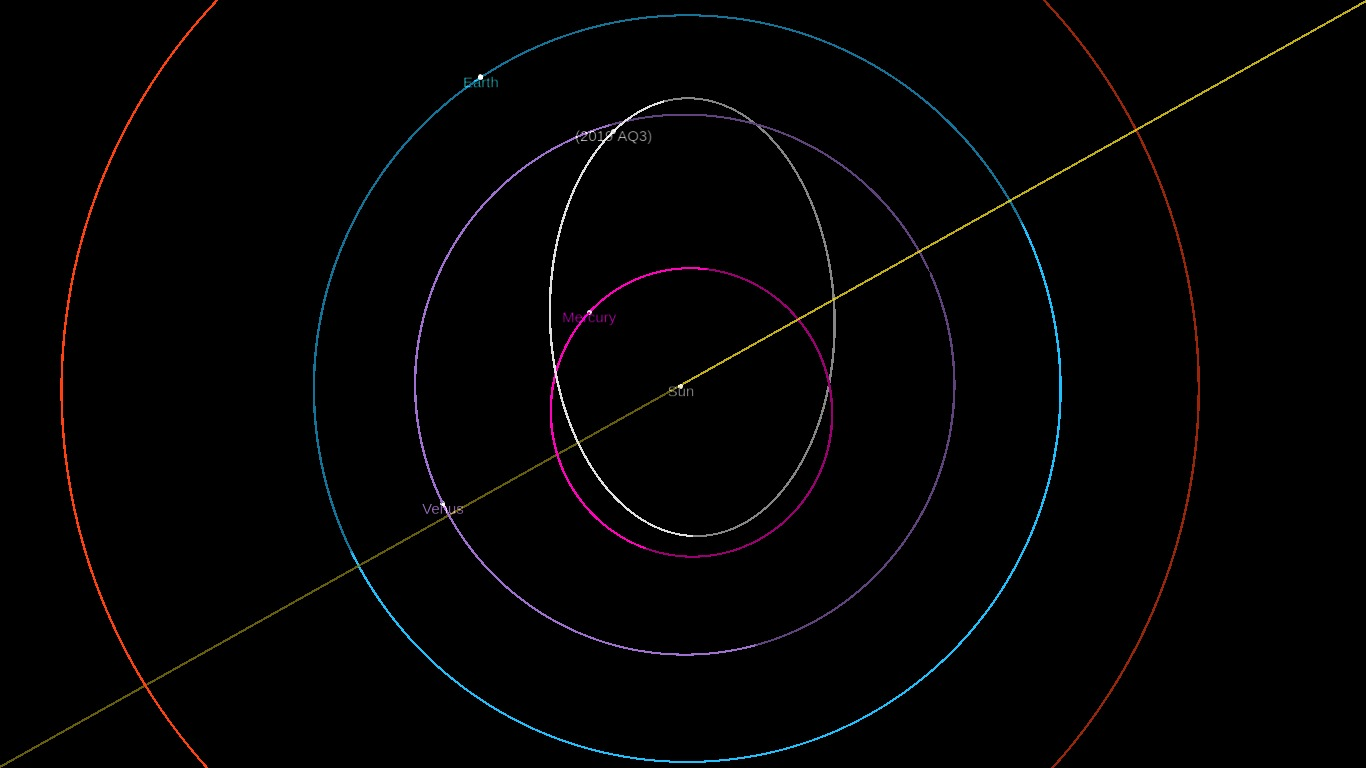
viewed from the ecliptic pole

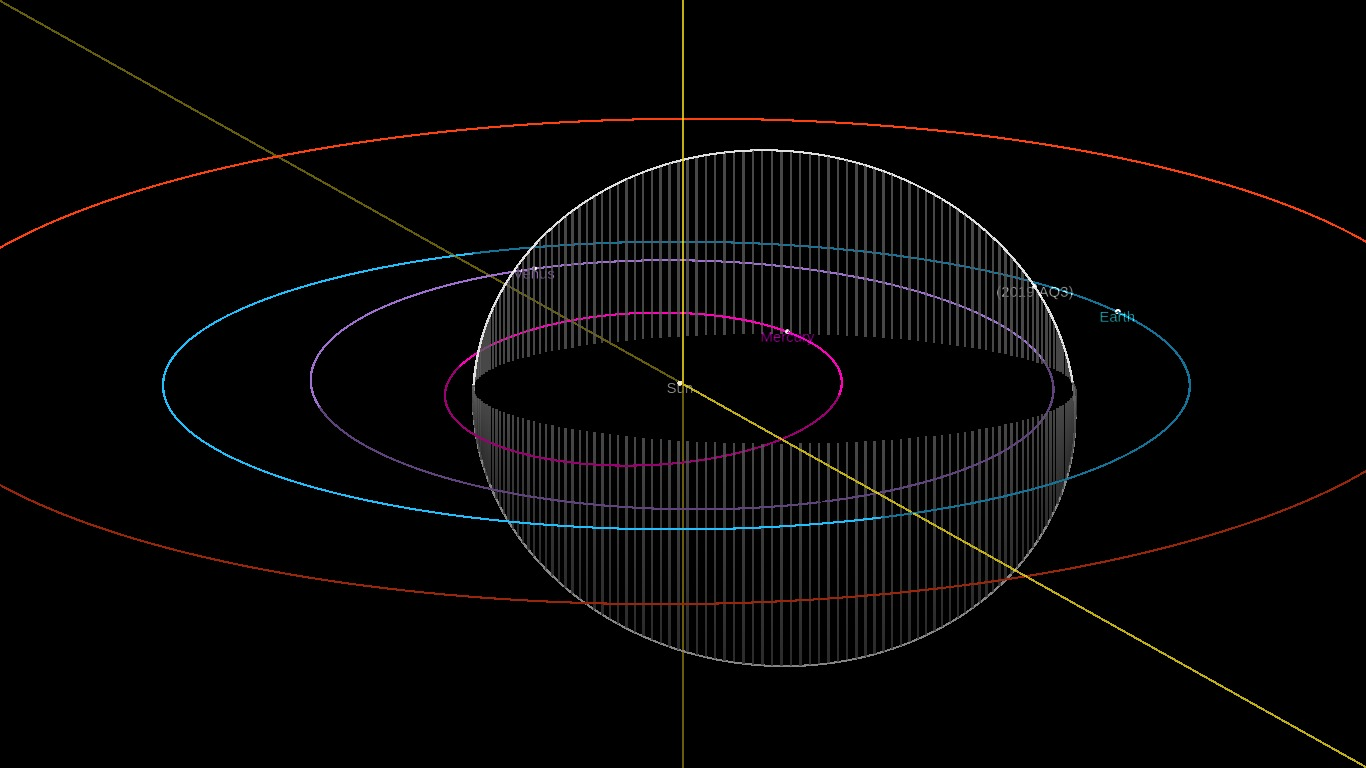
viewed face-on to the orbit

2019 AQ_{3} orbits the Sun at a distance of 0.40–0.77 AU once every 5 months (165 days; semi-major axis of 0.589 AU). Its orbit has an eccentricity of 0.31 and an inclination of 47° with respect to the ecliptic. The body's observation arc begins with a precovery taken by Pan-STARRS at Haleakala Observatory in October 2015, more than 3 years prior to its official first observation at the Zwicky Transient Facility on 4 January 2019. It has a minimum orbit intersection distance with Earth of 0.22 AU or 88 lunar distances.

=== Aphelion ===
2019 AQ_{3}'s orbit has the third-smallest aphelion of any known asteroid in the Solar System, never distancing itself more than 0.774 AU from the Sun (77% of Earth's average orbital distance). Before its discovery, the record was held by (418265) 2008 EA_{32} at an aphelion of 0.804 AU, which is notably larger. 2019 AQ_{3}'s orbit also has a semi-major axis below that of Venus (0.723 AU) and an orbital period of 165 days, which is the third shortest among all asteroids.

=== Atira class ===
2019 AQ_{3} is a member of the small class of Atira asteroids, which are also known as Apoheles or interior-Earth objects, as their orbits are confined inside that of Earth's. This makes their discovery difficult, as they stay relatively close to the Sun when observed from Earth, never reaching a Solar elongation of more than 90°, often much less. Only 19 such asteroids are known, 14 of which still reach 90% Earth's distance from the Sun over the course of their orbit.

=== Inclination ===
The asteroid's orbit is also highly inclined with respect to the plane of the Solar System, at more than 47°, the highest inclination of any known Atira asteroid, although there are many near-Earth asteroids with even higher inclinations.

Near-Earth asteroid discoveries (larger than 1 km) by year and survey since 1995 (as of April 2024): LINEAR; NEAT; Spacewatch; LONEOS; CSS / Pan-STARRS; NEOWISE; ATLAS; Other-US; Others

=== Perturbations ===
On the short-term, 2019 AQ_{3} has a fairly quickly-changing orbit. Between 1600 AD and 2500 AD its aphelion distance lowers slightly from 0.7746 to 0.7725 AU, its perihelion distance increases slightly from 0.4025 to 0.4046 AU, and its inclination increases slightly from 47.19 to 47.25°. It is not subjected to a Kozai resonance because although its eccentricity and inclination oscillate in synchrony (when the eccentricity reaches its maximum value, the inclination is at its lowest and vice versa) over a long period of time, the value of the argument of perihelion circulates; the Earth–Moon system and Jupiter are its dominant perturbers.

== Numbering and naming ==
As of July 2025, this minor planet has neither been numbered nor named by the Minor Planet Center.

== Physical characteristics ==
The object's diameter is estimated at 0.9–2 kilometers (0.56–1.2 miles), which corresponds to an geometric albedo range of 0.05 to 0.25 for an absolute magnitude of 17.376. The Minor Planet Center also considers 2019 AQ_{3} to be larger than 1 kilometer. However, these are estimates with no published radar or infrared measurements providing a more precise value for the body's diameter. As of April 2024, 861 kilometer-sized near-Earth asteroids have been discovered.
