= Geminids =

Meteor shower

Geminids (GEM)
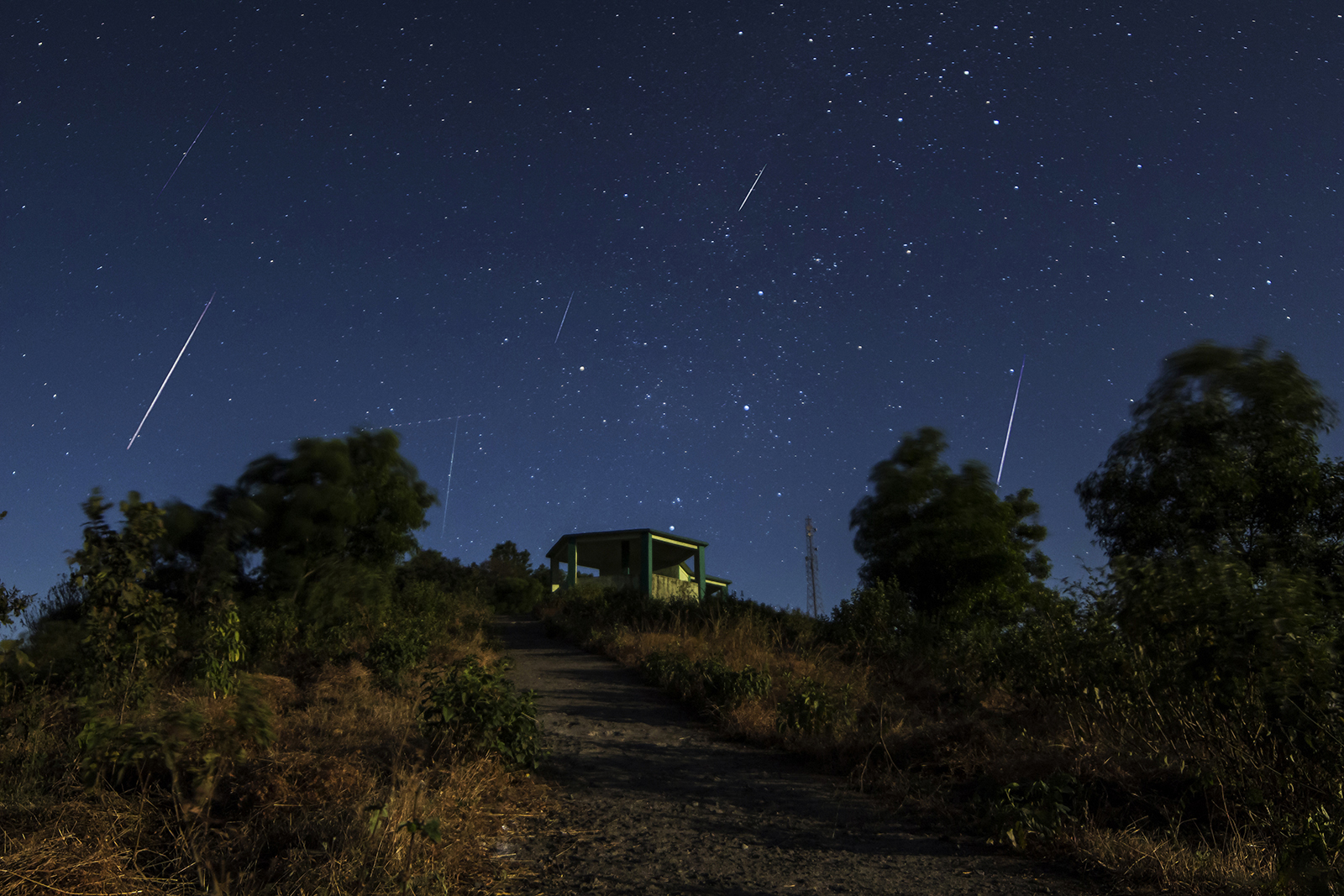
- The Geminids meteor shower as seen from the Northern Hemisphere, in December 2013
- Pronunciation: /ˈdʒɛmənədz/
- Discovery date: 1862
- Parent body: 3200 Phaethon

Radiant
- Constellation: Gemini (near Castor)
- Right ascension: 07^{h} 28^{m}
- Declination: +32°

Properties
- Occurs during: 4 December – 17 December
- Date of peak: 14 December
- Velocity: 35 km/s
- Zenithal hourly rate: 120

The Geminids are a prolific meteor shower, the parent body of which is 3200 Phaethon (which is thought to be an Apollo asteroid with a "rock comet" orbit). Because of this, it would make this shower, along with the Quadrantids, the only major meteor showers not originating from a comet. The meteors from this shower are slow; they can be seen in December and usually peak around December 4–16, with the date of highest intensity being the morning of December 14. Current showers produce up to 120–160 meteors per hour under optimal conditions, peaking at around 2:00 or 3:00. Geminids were first observed in 1862, much later than other showers such as the Perseids (36 AD) and Leonids (902 AD).

Based on data from the Parker Solar Probe, a 2023 study suggested that the Geminids may have been formed by the catastrophic breakup of a comet that formed asteroids 2005 UD and 1999 YC in addition to Phaethon.

== Background ==
The Geminid meteor shower is unique among celestial events as it originates not from a comet but from the asteroid 3200 Phaethon, discovered on Oct. 11, 1983, by the Infrared Astronomical Satellite (IRAS). Phaethon's 1.4-year orbit around the Sun and its comet-like elliptical trajectory have led scientists to speculate if it is a "dead comet" or a distinct celestial entity known as a "rock comet". Despite its comet-like orbit, Phaethon lacks a cometary tail and exhibits spectra resembling a rocky asteroid. The Geminid meteoroids formed from Phaethon are denser (2–3 g/cm^{3}) than typical cometary dust flakes (0.3 g/cm^{3}). Named after the Greek mythological figure who drove the Sun-god Helios' chariot, Phaethon's discovery was attributed to astronomer Fred Whipple.

== Radiant ==
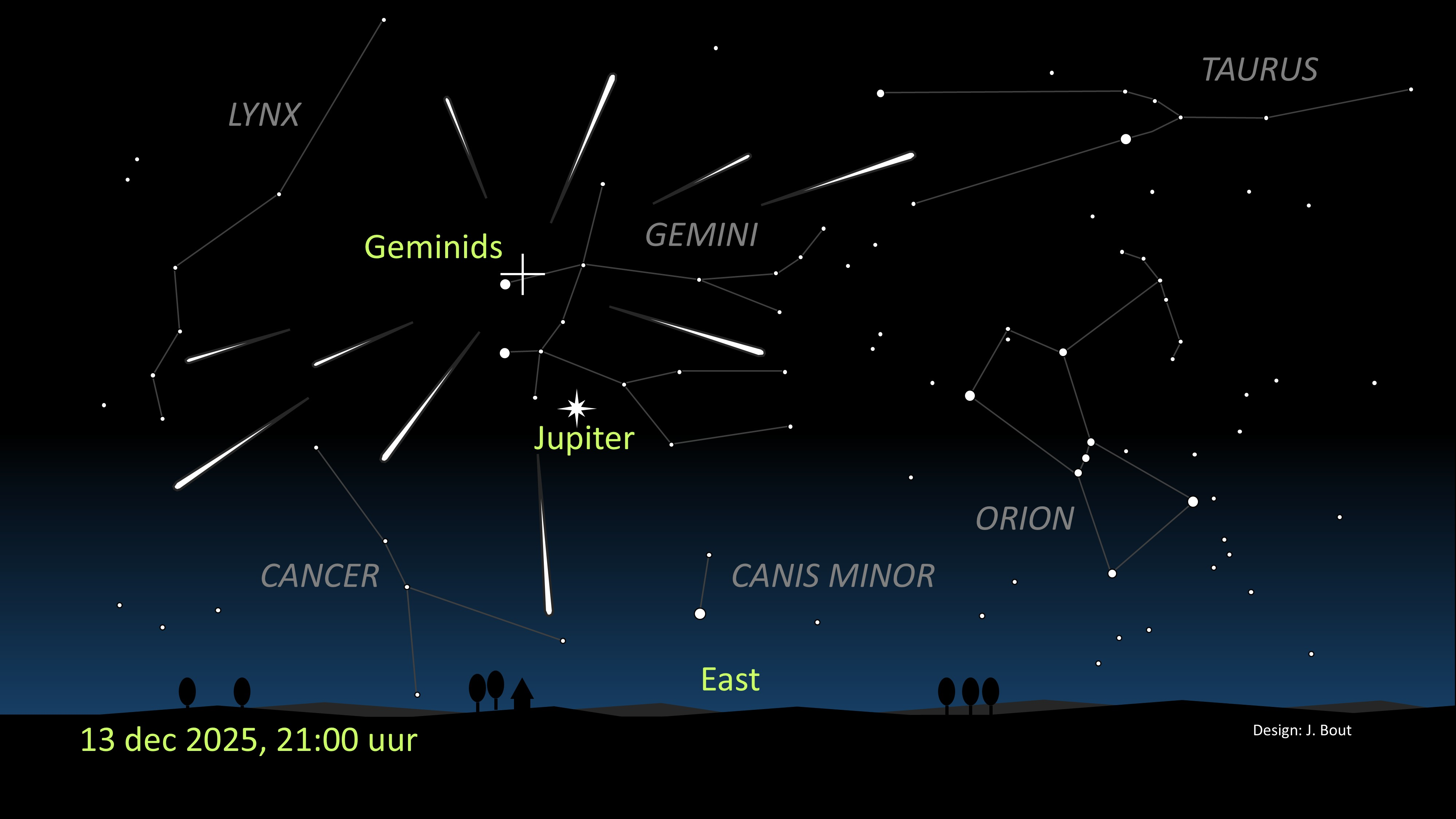
Appearance of the Geminids on 13 December 2025 at 21:00 local winter time

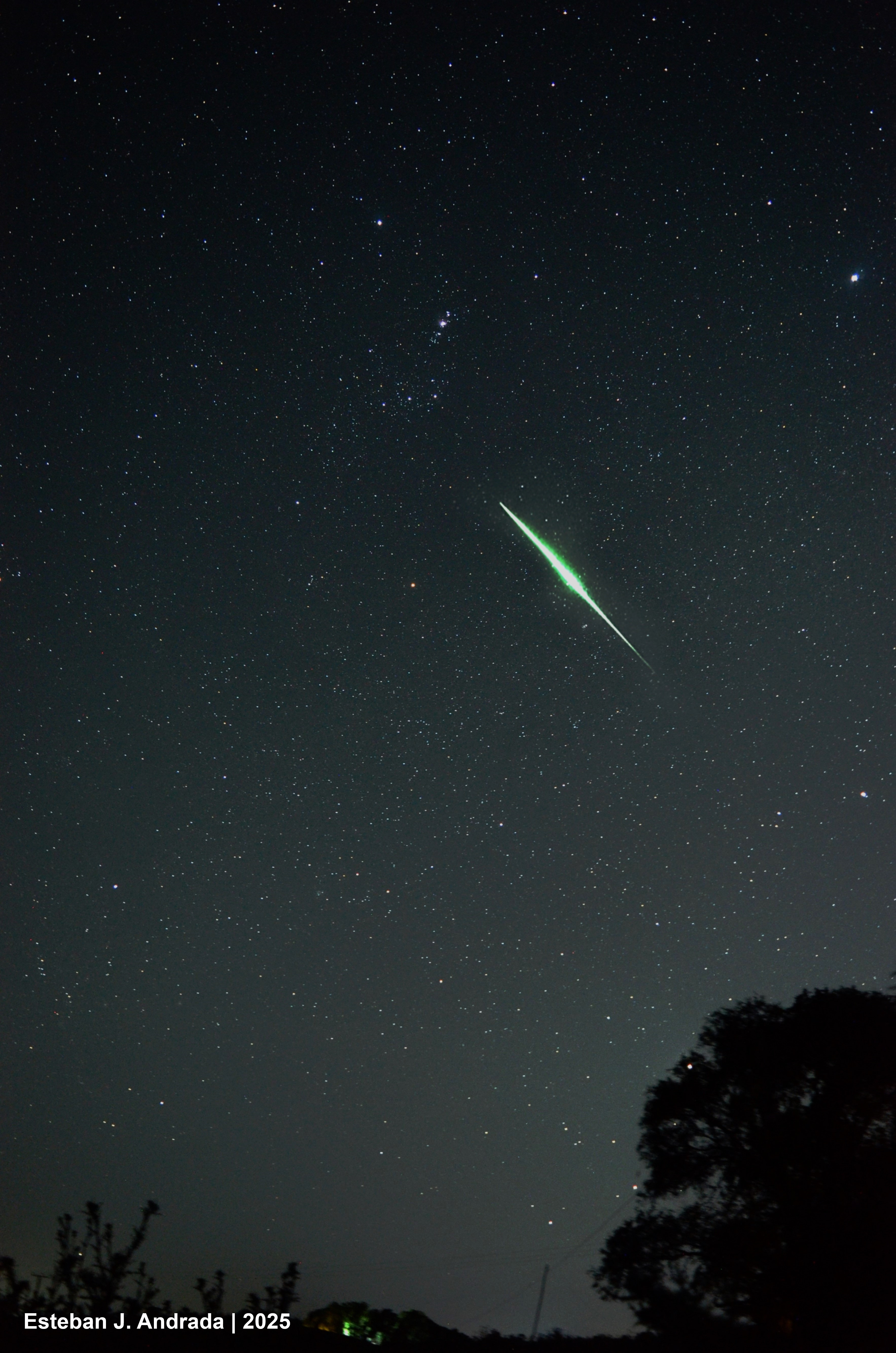
This image offers us a close encounter with a Geminid meteor, observed from Mar del Plata, Argentina.

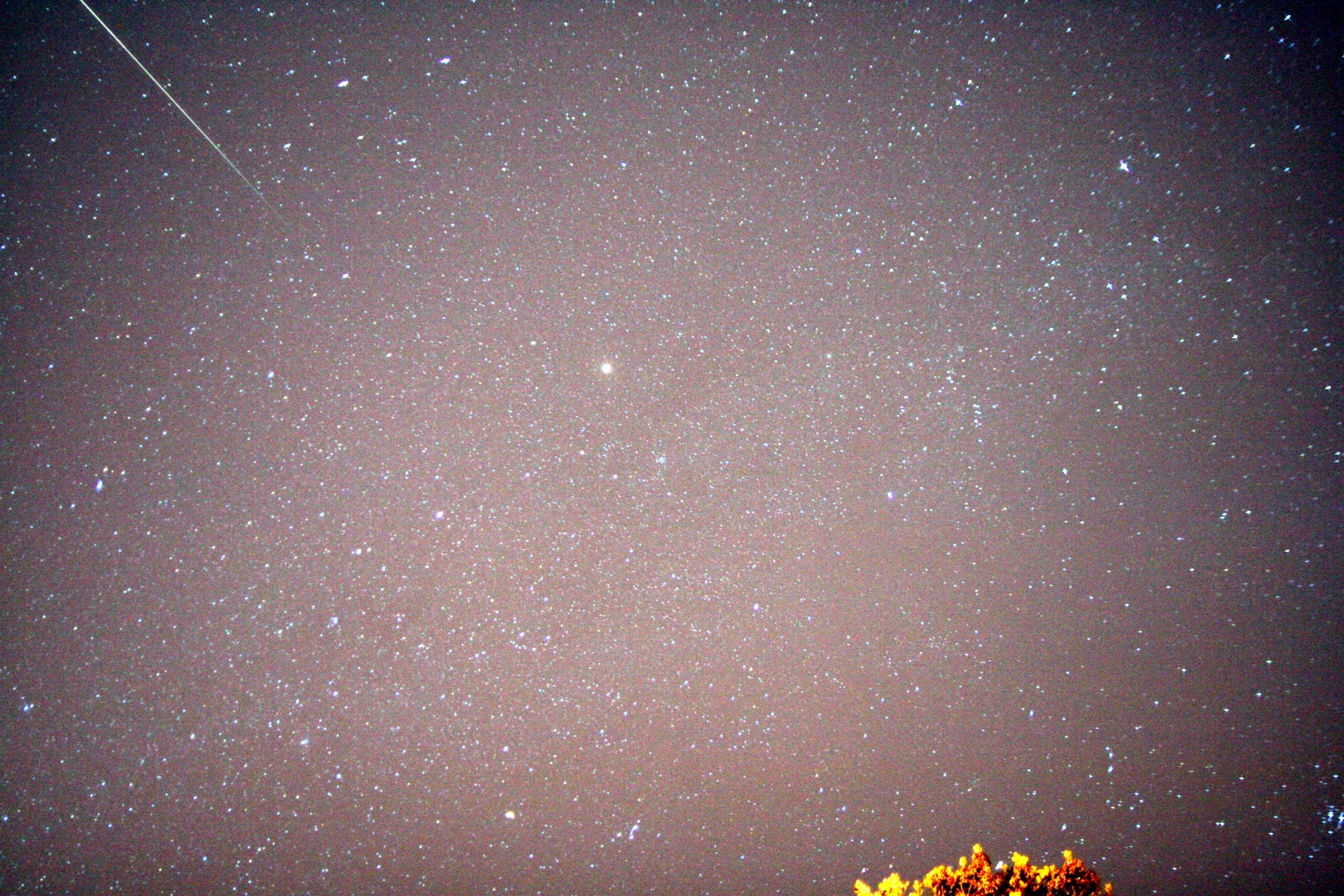
A Geminid meteor in 2007, seen from San Francisco

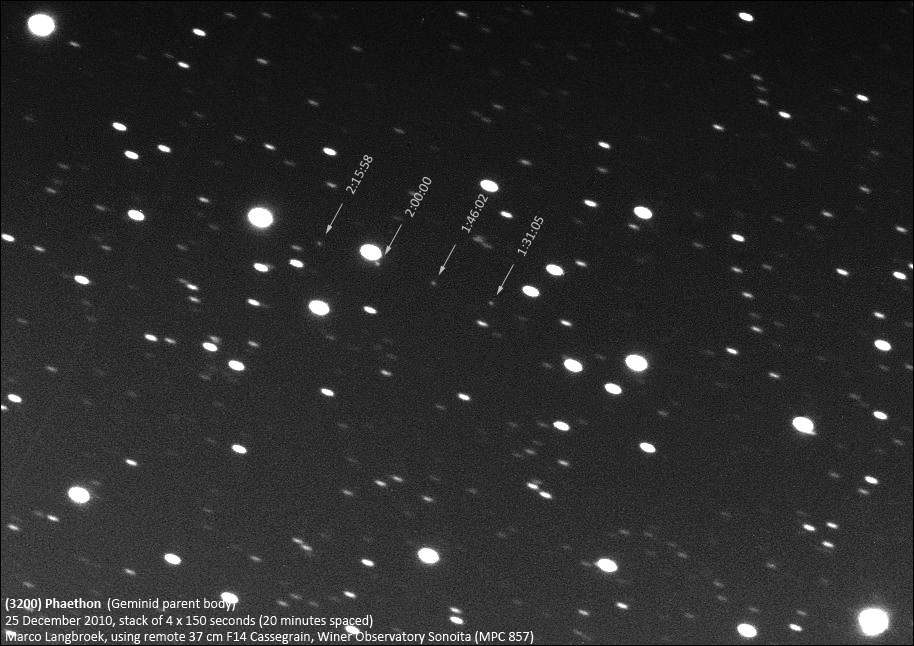
Asteroid (3200) Phaethon, parent body of the Geminids, imaged on 25 December 2010, with the 37 cm F14 Cassegrain telescope of Winer Observatory, Sonoita (MPC 857)

The meteors in this shower appear to come from the radiant in the constellation Gemini (hence the shower's name). However, they can appear almost anywhere in the night sky, and often appear yellowish in hue. Well north of the equator, the radiant rises about sunset, reaching a usable elevation from the local evening hours onwards. In the southern hemisphere, the radiant appears only around local midnight or so. Observers in the northern hemisphere will see higher Geminid rates as the radiant is higher in the sky. The meteors travel at medium speed in relation to other showers, at about 22 miles per second (35 km/s), making them fairly easy to spot. They usually fall apart while at heights above 24 miles (39 km).

Animated GIF of a Geminid meteor falling earthwards

== Timeline ==
Year	Peak of shower	ZHR_{max}	Lunar phase
2006	December 14	132	33% waning crescent
2007	December 14	170	30% waxing crescent
2008	December 13	114	95% full moon
2009	December 14	140	9% new moon
2010	December 14	126	59% first quarter
2011	December 14	193	86% waning gibbous
2012	December 13	134	2% new moon
2013	December 14	172	92% full moon
2014	December 13	168	50% last quarter
2015	December 14	203	10% waxing crescent
2016	December 14	157	100% full moon
2017	December 14	145	13% waning crescent
2018	December 14	155±9	41% waxing crescent
2019	December 14	111	94% waning gibbous
2020	December 14	133	2% waning crescent
2021	December 14	128	73% waxing gibbous
2022	December 14	113	72% waning gibbous
2023	December 14	92	0% waxing crescent
2024	December 13–14	112	99% waxing gibbous
2025	December 14	150	26% waning crescent

== See also ==
- List of meteor showers
