= (196256) 2003 EH1 =

Near-Earth asteroid

(196256) 2003 EH_{1}
Discovery
- Discovered by: LONEOS
- Discovery date: 6 March 2003

Designations
- Minor planet category: NEO · Amor extinct comet

Orbital characteristics
- Epoch 13 January 2016 (JD 2457400.5)
- Uncertainty parameter 0
- Observation arc: 4035 days (11.05 yr)
- Aphelion: 5.055446 AU (756.2840 Gm) (Q)
- Perihelion: 1.190060 AU (178.0304 Gm) (q)
- Semi-major axis: 3.12275 AU (467.157 Gm) (a)
- Eccentricity: 0.618907 (e)
- Orbital period (sidereal): 5.52 yr (2015.6 d)
- Mean anomaly: 119.8736° (M)
- Mean motion: 0° 10^{m} 42.984^{s} / day (n)
- Inclination: 70.865968° (i)
- Longitude of ascending node: 282.972499° (Ω)
- Argument of perihelion: 171.3709° (ω)
- Earth MOID: 0.21143 AU (31.629 Gm)
- Jupiter MOID: 0.231939 AU (34.6976 Gm)
- T_{Jupiter}: 2.065

Physical characteristics
- Dimensions: 2.6–4.0 km (1.6–2.5 mi)
- Sidereal rotation period: 12.650±0.033 h
- Geometric albedo: 0.04–0.09 (assumed)
- Absolute magnitude (H): 16.2

(196256) 2003 EH_{1} is an asteroid, classified as a near-Earth object of the Amor group. It was discovered on 6 March 2003, by astronomers of the LONEOS program at Anderson Mesa Station near Flagstaff, Arizona, in the United States. Peter Jenniskens (2003–2004) proposed that it is the parent body of the Quadrantid meteor shower. 2003 EH_{1} is likely an extinct comet and may even be related to the comet C/1490 Y1. 2003 EH_{1} came to perihelion on 12 March 2014.

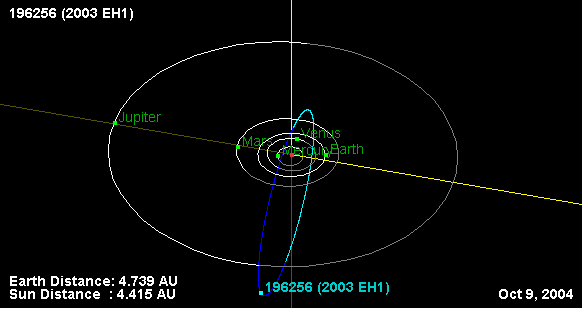
The orbit of 2003 EH_{1}
