= Quadrantids =

Meteor shower

Quadrantids (QUA)
- Pronunciation: /kwɒˈdræntədz/
- Discovery date: 1820s
- Parent body: 2003 EH_{1}

Radiant
- Constellation: Boötes
- Right ascension: 15^{h} 28^{m}
- Declination: +50°

Properties
- Occurs during: December 28 – January 12
- Date of peak: January 3
- Velocity: 41 km/s
- Zenithal hourly rate: 120

The Quadrantids (QUA) are a meteor shower that peaks in early January and whose radiant lies in the constellation Boötes. The zenithal hourly rate (ZHR) of this shower can be as high as that of two other reliably rich meteor showers, the Perseids in August and the Geminids in December, yet Quadrantid meteors are not seen as often as those of the two other showers because the time frame of the peak is exceedingly narrow, sometimes lasting only hours. Moreover, the meteors are quite faint, with mean apparent magnitudes between 3.0 and 6.0.

== Observations and associations ==
The meteor rates exceed one-half of their highest value for only about eight hours (compared to two days for the August Perseids), which means that the stream of particles that produces this shower is narrow, and apparently deriving within the last 500 years from some orbiting body. The parent body of the Quadrantids was tentatively identified in 2003 by Peter Jenniskens as the minor planet 2003 EH_{1}, which in turn may be related to the comet C/1490 Y1 that was observed by Chinese, Japanese and Korean astronomers some 500 years ago.

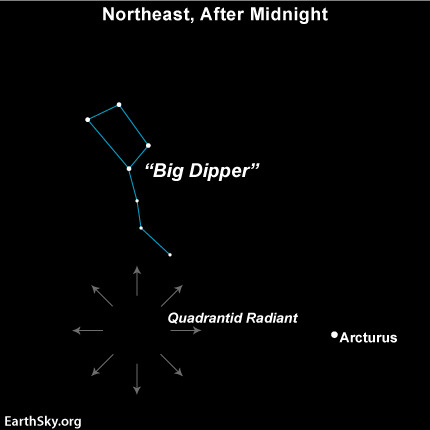
Radiant point of Quadrantid meteor shower, active each year in early January

The radiant point of this shower is at the northern edge of the constellation Boötes, not far from the Big Dipper. It lies between the end of the handle of the Big Dipper and the quadrilateral of stars marking the head of the constellation Draco. This meteor shower is best seen in the northern hemisphere, but it can be seen partly to 50 degrees south latitude.

The name comes from Quadrans Muralis, a former constellation created in 1795 by the French astronomer Jérôme Lalande that included portions of Boötes and Draco. In early January 1825, Antonio Brucalassi in Italy reported that “the atmosphere was traversed by a multitude of the luminous bodies known by the name of falling stars.” They appeared to radiate from Quadrans Muralis. In 1839, Adolphe Quetelet of Brussels Observatory in Belgium and Edward C. Herrick in Connecticut independently made the suggestion that the Quadrantids are an annual shower.

In 1922, the International Astronomical Union (IAU) devised a list of 88 modern constellations. The list was agreed upon by the IAU at its inaugural general assembly held in Rome in May 1922. It did not include a constellation Quadrans Muralis. The IAU officially adopted this list in 1930, but this meteor shower still retains the name Quadrantids, for the original and now-obsolete constellation.

| Year | Quadrantids active during | Peak of shower | ZHR_{max} |
|---|---|---|---|
| 2008 | Jan. 1–5 | Jan. 4 | 82 |
| 2009 | Jan. 1–5 | Jan. 3 | 146 |
| 2010 | | Waning gibbous Moon (full Moon on Dec. 31) | |
| 2011 | Dec. 28 – Jan. 12 | Jan. 3 | 90 |
| 2012 | Dec. 28 – Jan. 12 | Jan. 4 | 83 |
| 2013 | | Jan. 3 Waning gibbous Moon (full Moon on Dec. 28) | 137 |
| 2014 | | Jan. 4 Main peak with ZHR_{max}=245 between Jan. 3 17:00 UT and 22:30 UT; isolated brief spike of ZHR_{max}=315 Jan. 4 at 18:00 UT | 315 |
| 2015 | | Waxing gibbous Moon (full Moon on Jan. 5) | |
| 2016 | | Jan. 3 at 14 UT (15 CET/9 EST) | |
| 2017 | | Jan. 3 at 15 UT (16 CET/10 EST) | |
| 2018 | | Jan. 3 at 19 UT (20 CET/14 EST) | |
| 2019 | | Jan. 4 at 2 UT (21 EST on Jan. 3) | |
| 2020 | | Jan. 4 at 4 UT (23 EST on Jan. 3) | |
| 2021 | | | |
| 2022 | | | |
| 2023 | | | |
| 2024 | | Jan. 4 at 9 - 15 UT | |
| 2025 | | Jan. 3 at 15 UT | |

== See also ==
- (196256) 2003 EH1
- Qingyang event
- List of meteor showers
- Meteor showers
