= 3200 Phaethon =

Asteroid responsible for the Geminids meteor shower

- Radar image of 3200 Phaethon taken by Arecibo, December 17, 2017

Discovery
- Discovered by: Simon Green; John K. Davies / IRAS
- Discovery date: October 11, 1983

Designations
- Pronunciation: /ˈfeɪ.əθɒn/
- Named after: Phaëthon
- Alternative designations: 1983 TB; Phæton
- Minor planet category: Apollo asteroid; Potentially hazardous asteroid; Mercury-crosser asteroid; Venus-crosser asteroid; Earth-crosser asteroid; Mars-crosser asteroid
- Adjectives: Phaethonian /feɪəˈθoʊniən/

Orbital characteristics
- Epoch April 27, 2019 (JD 2458000.5)
- Uncertainty parameter 0
- Observation arc: 12,941 days (35.43 yr)
- Aphelion: 2.4028 AU (359 million km)
- Perihelion: 0.13998 AU (20.9 million km)
- Semi-major axis: 1.2714 AU (190 million km)
- Eccentricity: 0.88990
- Orbital period (sidereal): 523.6 days (1.434 yr)
- Average orbital speed: 19.9 km/s (45,000 mph)
- Mean anomaly: 313.94°
- Mean motion: 0° 41^{m} 15.108^{s} / day
- Inclination: 22.260°
- Longitude of ascending node: 265.22°
- Time of perihelion: May 15, 2022
- Argument of perihelion: 322.19°
- Earth MOID: 0.01955 AU (7.61 LD; 2.92 million km)
- Venus MOID: 0.0469 AU (7.02 million km)
- Jupiter MOID: 2.7375 AU (410 million km)
- T_{Jupiter}: 4.510

Physical characteristics
- Dimensions: 6.13±0.05 × 4.40±0.06 km
- Mean diameter: 5.8 km (3.6 mi)
- Synodic rotation period: 3.604 hours (0.1502 d)
- Geometric albedo: 0.1066±0.011
- Spectral type: F-type asteroid
- Apparent magnitude: 10.7 (December 14, 2017)
- Absolute magnitude (H): 14.6

3200 Phaethon, provisionally designated 1983 TB and previously sometimes erroneously spelled Phæton, is an active Apollo asteroid with an orbit that brings it closer to the Sun than any other named asteroid (though there are numerous unnamed asteroids with smaller perihelia, such as (137924) 2000 BD19). For this reason, it was named after the Greek Hero, Phaëthon, son of the sun god Helios. It is 5.8 km (3.6 mi) in diameter and is the parent body of the Geminids meteor shower of mid-December. With an observation arc of 35+ years, it has a very well determined orbit. The 2017 Earth approach distance of about 10 million km was known with an accuracy of ±700 m.

== Discovery ==
Phaethon was the first asteroid to be discovered using images from a spacecraft. Simon F. Green and John K. Davies discovered it in images from October 11, 1983, while searching Infrared Astronomical Satellite (IRAS) data for moving objects. It was formally announced on October 14 in IAUC 3878 along with optical confirmation by Charles T. Kowal, who reported it to be asteroidal in appearance. Its provisional designation was 1983 TB, and it later received the numerical designation and name 3200 Phaethon in 1985.

== Orbital characteristics ==
Animation of 3200 Phaethon's orbit Sun · Mercury · Venus · Earth · Mars · 3200 Phaethon

Phaethon is categorized as an Apollo asteroid, as its orbital semi-major axis is greater than that of the Earth's at 1.27 AU (190 million km; 118 million mi). It is also suspected to be a member of the Pallas family of asteroids.

Its most remarkable distinction is that it approaches the Sun closer than any other named asteroid: its perihelion is only 0.14 AU (20.9 million km; 13.0 million mi) — less than half of Mercury's perihelial distance. It is a Mercury-, Venus-, Earth-, and Mars-crosser as a result of its high orbital eccentricity. The surface temperature at perihelion could reach around 1,025 K (750 °C; 1,390 °F).

Phaethon is a possible candidate for detecting general relativistic and/or solar oblateness effects in its orbital motion due to the frequent close approaches to the Sun. The Apollo asteroids (155140) 2005 UD and (225416) 1999 YC share similar orbits with Phaethon, suggesting a possible common breakup origin.

=== Potentially hazardous asteroid ===
Phaethon is categorized as a potentially hazardous asteroid (PHA), but that does not mean there is a near-term threat of an impact. It is a potentially hazardous asteroid merely as a result of its size (absolute magnitude H ≤ 22) and Earth minimum orbit intersection distance (Earth MOID ≤ 0.05 AU). The Earth minimum orbit intersection distance (E-MOID) is 0.01945 AU (2,910,000 km; 1,808,000 mi), which is defined by the shortest distance between the orbit of Phaethon and the orbit of Earth. With a 30+ year observation arc, the orbit of Phaethon is very well understood with very small uncertainties. Close approaches of Phaethon are well constrained for the next 400 years.

Chronology of close approaches of large near-Earth objects since 1981 ^{(A)}

PHA	Date	Approach distance in lunar distances			Abs. mag (H)	Diameter ^{(C)} (m)	Ref ^{(D)}
PHA	Date	Nominal ^{(B)}	Minimum	Maximum	Abs. mag (H)	Diameter ^{(C)} (m)	Ref ^{(D)}
(143651) 2003 QO104	1981-05-18	2.761	2.760	2.761	16.0	1333–4306	data
2014 LJ21	1989-08-01	7.034	6.843	7.224	16.0	1333–4306	data
4179 Toutatis	1992-12-08	9.399	9.399	9.399	15.30	2440–2450	data
4179 Toutatis	2004-09-29	4.031	4.031	4.031	15.30	2440–2450	data
(159857) 2004 LJ1	2038-11-16	7.719	7.719	7.719	15.4	1746–4394	data
(4953) 1990 MU	2058-06-05	8.986	8.984	8.988	14.1	3199–10329	data
4179 Toutatis	2069-11-05	7.725	7.724	7.725	15.30	2440–2450	data
(52768) 1998 OR2	2079-04-16	4.611	4.611	4.612	15.8	1462–4721	data
(415029) 2011 UL21	2089-06-25	6.936	6.935	6.938	15.7	1531–4944	data
3200 Phaethon	2093-12-14	7.714	7.709	7.718	14.6	4900–5300	data
(52768) 1998 OR2	2127-04-16	6.536	6.510	6.563	15.8	1462–4721	data
^{(A)} This list includes near-Earth approaches of less than 10 lunar distances (LD) of objects with H brighter than 16.^{(B)} Nominal geocentric distance from the center of Earth to the center of the object (Earth has a radius of approximately 6,400 km).^{(C)} Diameter: estimated, theoretical mean-diameter based on H and albedo range between X and Y.^{(D)} Reference: data source from the JPL SBDB, with AU converted into LD (1 AU≈390 LD)^{(E)} Color codes: unobserved at close approach observed during close approach upcoming approaches

== Physical characteristics ==
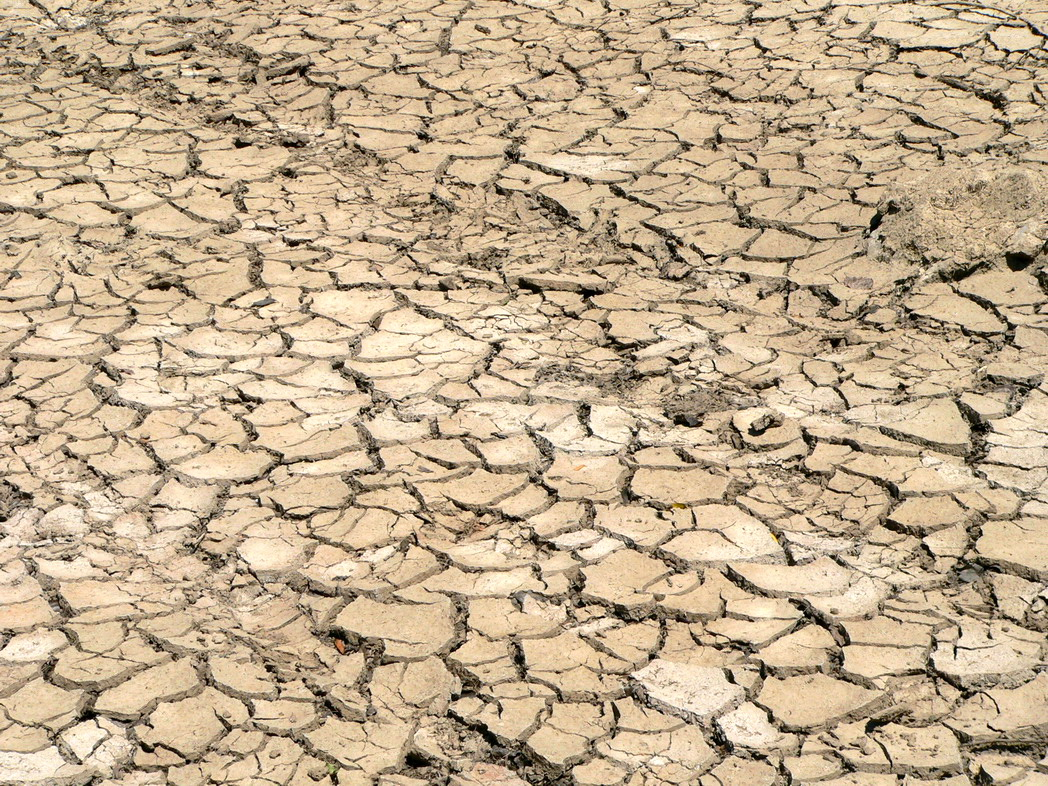
Phaethon's dust ejection is likely caused by a mechanism similar to how mud in a dry lake bottom cracks from heat

Phaethon is an asteroid with fairly unusual characteristics in that its orbit more closely resembles that of a comet than an asteroid; it has been referred to as a "rock comet". In studies performed by NASA's STEREO spacecraft in 2009 and 2012, rapid brightening and a visible tail have been observed. It is possible that the Sun's heat is causing fractures similar to mudcracks in a dry lake bed. This occurs because Phaethon's orbit takes it closer to the Sun than any other named asteroid (0.14 AU at perihelion) causing extreme heating and enough solar radiation pressure to push any separated pieces off the asteroid's surface. Since its discovery, several other objects were found exhibiting mixed cometary and asteroidal features, such as 133P/Elst–Pizarro, leading to a new class of objects dubbed "active asteroids".

In 2007, observations revealed that Phaethon was blue in color corresponding to a B-type asteroid in the Bus taxonomy. In 2020, polarimetric study revealed Phaethon has a surface with steep slopes covered by a mix of regolith with larger pebbles. Phaethon's composition fits both, the notion of its cometary origin and that of an active asteroid; it is classified as a F-type asteroid because it is composed of dark material or a B-type asteroid because of its blue color. In 2009, showed that the spectral shape is similar to that of aqueously altered CI/CM meteorites. Later, in 2022, it was shown how Phaethon's blue color and its rock-comet-like emission activity could be explained by the effects of the intense solar heating at perihelion causing sublimation of any darkish-red refractory organic, nano-phase iron (nFe0), and pyroxene materials on its surface.

Analysis of a mid-infrared spectral emissivity spectrum from the Spitzer Space Telescope showed Phaethon to be linked to the rare Yamato-type (CY) carbonaceous chondrites. This link rules out other carbonaceous meteorite types, although the understanding of the origins of CYs are evolving. Further analysis of this spectrum confirmed the presence of Mg-rich olivine, carbonates, and Fe-sulfides. Until further studies were done in 2023, it was believed that thermal decomposition and outgassing of these minerals during perihelion led to dust ejection, possibly explaining a faint observed tail and the formation of the Geminid meteor stream. However in a 2023 NASA study imaging from the SOHO spacecraft revealed that the material emitted from the asteroid was sodium gas, with filtered images revealing no sign of dust at all. This cast doubt on the origin of the Geminids being dust and material cast off from Phaethon during periodic solar perihelions, and instead invited speculation of an ancient breakup event.

== Meteor shower ==
Shortly after its discovery, Fred Whipple noted that Phaethon's orbital elements were extremely similar to those of the Geminid meteor shower, indicating that Phaethon was the meteor shower's long-sought parent body.

== Planned flyby ==
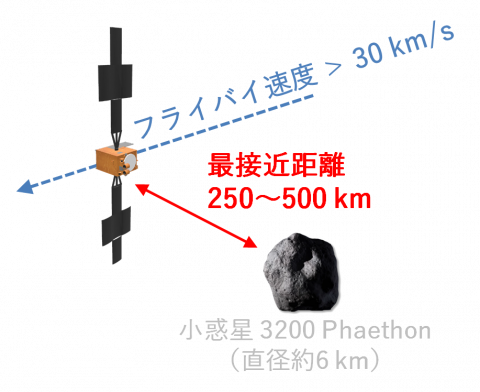
The DESTINY+ spacecraft's planned flyby over asteroid 3200 Phaethon.

DESTINY^{+} (Demonstration and Experiment of Space Technology for Interplanetary Voyage with Phaethon Flyby and Dust Science) is a planned mission to fly by 3200 Phaethon, as well as various minor bodies originating from it. The spacecraft is being developed by Japanese space agency JAXA and will demonstrate advanced technology for future deep space exploration. DESTINY^{+} is planned to be launched no earlier than 2028.

== Close approaches ==
Phaethon approached to 0.120895 AU (18,085,600 km; 11,237,900 mi) of Earth on December 10, 2007, and was detected by radar at Arecibo. When Phaethon came to perihelion in July 2009, it was found to be brighter than expected. During its approach, the STEREO-A spacecraft detected an unexpected brightening, roughly by a factor of two.

=== 2010 approach ===
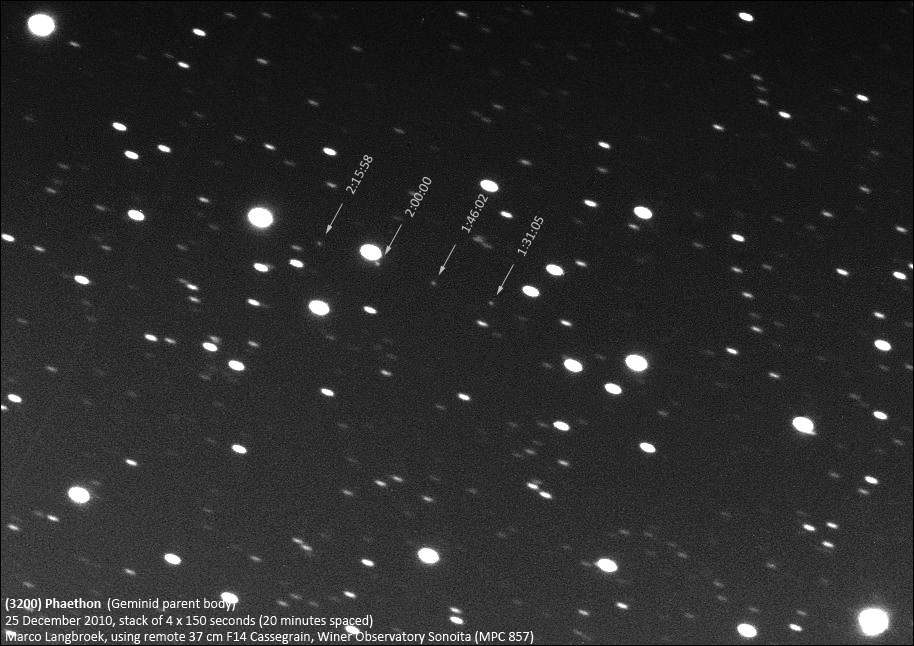
Phaethon imaged on December 25, 2010, with the 37-cm f/14 Rigel telescope at Winer Observatory by Marco Langbroek

=== 2017 approach ===
On December 16, 2017, at 23:00 UT, Phaethon passed 0.06893169 AU (10,312,034 km; 6,407,601 mi) from Earth (27 lunar distances). The Earth approach distance was known with a 3-sigma precision of ±700 m. (Note: In 2014, JPL 374 (solution date 2014-Sep-12) showed a 2017 Earth approach distance with a precision of ±80 km. Math: (MAX−MIN) * AU / 2) This was the best opportunity to date for radar observations by Goldstone and Arecibo, with a resolution of 75 meters/pixel (246 feet/pixel).

The asteroid was bright enough to see in small telescopes, peaking at magnitude 10.8 between December 13–15 while dimming slightly to magnitude 11 on December 16 at closest approach. Arecibo made observations of Phaethon from December 15–19. It will not make an Earth approach closer than the 2017 passage until December 14, 2093, when it will pass 0.01981 AU (2,964,000 km; 1,841,000 mi) from Earth.

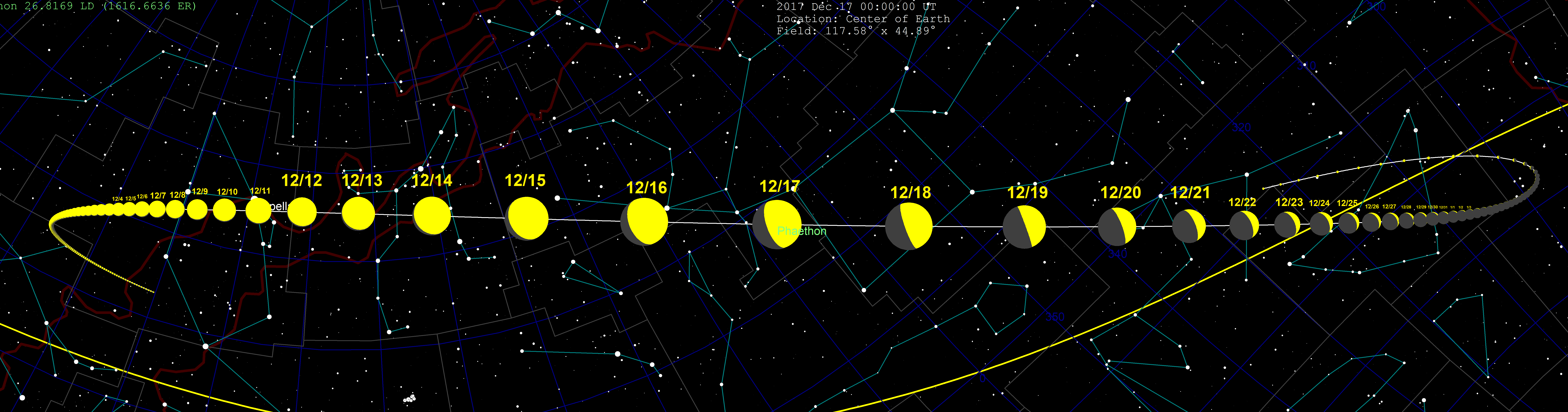
Path of 3200 Phaethon in the sky during December 2017

Time lapse taken through a telescope in Riga, Latvia (December 10, 2017)

Phaethon at maximum angular velocity, December 15, 2017, 18:47:13–19:24:50 UTC
