= (671294) 2014 JO25 =

Near-Earth asteroid discovered in 2014

(671294) 2014 JO_{25}
- Radar image of 2014 JO_{25} taken at Goldstone on 19 Apr 2017

Discovery
- Discovered by: Mount Lemmon Srvy.
- Discovery site: Mount Lemmon Obs. (first observation only)
- Discovery date: 5 May 2014

Designations
- Minor planet category: NEO · Apollo · PHA

Orbital characteristics
- Epoch 23 March 2018 (JD 2458200.5)
- Uncertainty parameter 0
- Observation arc: 6.02 yr (2,200 days)
- Aphelion: 3.8996 AU
- Perihelion: 0.2364 AU
- Semi-major axis: 2.0680 AU
- Eccentricity: 0.8857
- Orbital period (sidereal): 2.97 yr (1,086 days)
- Mean anomaly: 125.06°
- Mean motion: 0° 19^{m} 53.04^{s} / day
- Inclination: 25.261°
- Longitude of ascending node: 30.637°
- Argument of perihelion: 49.571°
- Earth MOID: 0.0110 AU (4.3 LD)
- Mercury MOID: 0.0210 AU
- Venus MOID: 0.0412 AU

Physical characteristics
- Mean diameter: 0.72 km (est. at 0.20); 0.818 km (calculated)
- Synodic rotation period: 4.531 h
- Geometric albedo: 0.20 (assumed)
- Spectral type: S (assumed)
- Absolute magnitude (H): 17.8

(671294) 2014 JO_{25} is a near-Earth asteroid. It was discovered in May 2014 by astronomers at the Catalina Sky Survey near Tucson, Arizona - a project of NASA's NEO (Near Earth Object) Observations Program in collaboration with the University of Arizona.

== Orbit and classification ==
2014 JO_{25} belongs to the Apollo asteroids, which cross the orbit of Earth. Apollos are the largest group of near-Earth objects with nearly 10 thousand known members. It is also a potentially hazardous asteroid due to its sufficiently large size, variously estimated as 650 to 870 meters (2,130 to 2,850 feet) wide, an absolute magnitude brighter than 22, and the closest distance between its orbit and Earth's.

It orbits the Sun at a distance of 0.25–3.90 AU once every 3 years (1,086 days; semi-major axis of 2.07 AU). Its orbit has an eccentricity of 0.89 and an inclination of 25° with respect to the ecliptic. This makes it also a Venus- and Mercury-crossing asteroid.

The body's observation arc begins with a precovery taken by Pan-STARRS in May 2011, or 3 years prior to its official first observation at Mount Lemmon.

=== Close approaches ===
This asteroid has a minimum orbital intersection distance (MOID) with Earth of 1,650,000 km; 1,020,000 mi (0.0110 AU), which translates into 4.3 lunar distances.

==== 2017 Earth flyby ====
2014 JO_{25} made a close flyby of Earth on 19 April 2017, and at its closest approach on that date came within 1.8 million kilometers (1.1 million miles) of the planet. It reached an apparent magnitude of 10.76.

The 2017 flyby within a distance of 1.8 million kilometers was the closest approach to Earth by 2014 JO_{25} for at least the next 400 years.

History of close approaches of large near-Earth objects since 1908 ^{(A)}

PHA	Date	Approach distance (lunar dist.)			Abs. mag (H)	Diameter ^{(C)} (m)	Ref ^{(D)}
PHA	Date	Nomi- nal^{(B)}	Mini- mum	Maxi- mum	Abs. mag (H)	Diameter ^{(C)} (m)	Ref ^{(D)}
(33342) 1998 WT24	1908-12-16	3.542	3.537	3.547	17.9	556–1795	data
(458732) 2011 MD5	1918-09-17	0.911	0.909	0.913	17.9	556–1795	data
(7482) 1994 PC1	1933-01-17	2.927	2.927	2.928	16.8	749–1357	data
69230 Hermes	1937-10-30	1.926	1.926	1.927	17.5	668–2158	data
69230 Hermes	1942-04-26	1.651	1.651	1.651	17.5	668–2158	data
(137108) 1999 AN10	1946-08-07	2.432	2.429	2.435	17.9	556–1795	data
(33342) 1998 WT24	1956-12-16	3.523	3.523	3.523	17.9	556–1795	data
(163243) 2002 FB3	1961-04-12	4.903	4.900	4.906	16.4	1669–1695	data
(192642) 1999 RD32	1969-08-27	3.627	3.625	3.630	16.3	1161–3750	data
(143651) 2003 QO104	1981-05-18	2.761	2.760	2.761	16.0	1333–4306	data
2017 CH1	1992-06-05	4.691	3.391	6.037	17.9	556–1795	data
(170086) 2002 XR14	1995-06-24	4.259	4.259	4.260	18.0	531–1714	data
(33342) 1998 WT24	2001-12-16	4.859	4.859	4.859	17.9	556–1795	data
4179 Toutatis	2004-09-29	4.031	4.031	4.031	15.3	2440–2450	data
(671294)2014 JO25	2017-04-19	4.573	4.573	4.573	17.8	582–1879	data
(137108) 1999 AN10	2027-08-07	1.014	1.010	1.019	17.9	556–1795	data
(35396) 1997 XF11	2028-10-26	2.417	2.417	2.418	16.9	881–2845	data
(154276) 2002 SY50	2071-10-30	3.415	3.412	3.418	17.6	714–1406	data
(164121) 2003 YT1	2073-04-29	4.409	4.409	4.409	16.2	1167–2267	data
(385343) 2002 LV	2076-08-04	4.184	4.183	4.185	16.6	1011–3266	data
(52768) 1998 OR2	2079-04-16	4.611	4.611	4.612	15.8	1462–4721	data
(33342) 1998 WT24	2099-12-18	4.919	4.919	4.919	17.9	556–1795	data
(85182) 1991 AQ	2130-01-27	4.140	4.139	4.141	17.1	1100	data
314082 Dryope	2186-07-16	3.709	2.996	4.786	17.5	668–2158	data
(137126) 1999 CF9	2192-08-21	4.970	4.967	4.973	18.0	531–1714	data
(290772) 2005 VC	2198-05-05	1.951	1.791	2.134	17.6	638–2061	data
^{(A)} List includes near-Earth approaches of less than 5 lunar distances (LD) of objects with H brighter than 18.^{(B)} Nominal geocentric distance from the Earth's center to the object's center (Earth radius≈0.017 LD).^{(C)} Diameter: estimated, theoretical mean-diameter based on H and albedo range between X and Y.^{(D)} Reference: data source from the JPL SBDB, with AU converted into LD (1 AU≈390 LD)^{(E)} Color codes: unobserved at close approach observed during close approach upcoming approaches

== Physical characteristics ==
2014 JO_{25} is a peanut-shaped contact binary asteroid. It is an assumed to be a stony S-type asteroid. The overall shape of the asteroid also resembles the "rubber ducky shaped" nucleus of Comet 67P/Churyumov-Gerasimenko.

=== Diameter and albedo ===
Early estimation based on observed absolute magnitude and estimated albedo indicates object 600–1400 meters (m) in diameter. In 2014, further research based on NEOWISE data indicated an object of 650 m in diameter and albedo 0.25.

Based on a generic magnitude-to-diameter conversion, 2014 JO_{25} measures approximately 720 m in diameter, using an absolute magnitude of 18.1 and assuming an albedo of 0.20, which is typical for stony asteroids. The Collaborative Asteroid Lightcurve Link assumes an albedo of 0.20 and calculates a diameter of 818 meters based on an absolute magnitude of 17.8.

Observation of the asteroid with the Goldstone Solar System Radar were performed between April 15 and 21, 2017 by Arecibo Observatory and Goldstone Solar System Radar. Results show that the largest dimension of this contact binary is at least 870 meters.

=== Rotation period ===
The 2017 radiometric observations at Arecibo and Goldstone also gave a rotation period of approximately 4.5 hours. Also in April 2017, a rotational lightcurve of this asteroid was obtained from photometric observations by Brian Warner at the Palmer Divide Station (U82) in California. Lightcurve analysis gave a refined period of 4.531 hours with a brightness amplitude between 0.14 and 0.64 magnitude (U=n.a.).

== Numbering and naming ==
This minor planet was numbered by the Minor Planet Center on 22 March 2024 (M.P.C. 172656). As of October 2025, it has not been named.

== Gallery ==
Radar images of the asteroid were taken on 18 April 2017 by the Goldstone Solar System Radar:

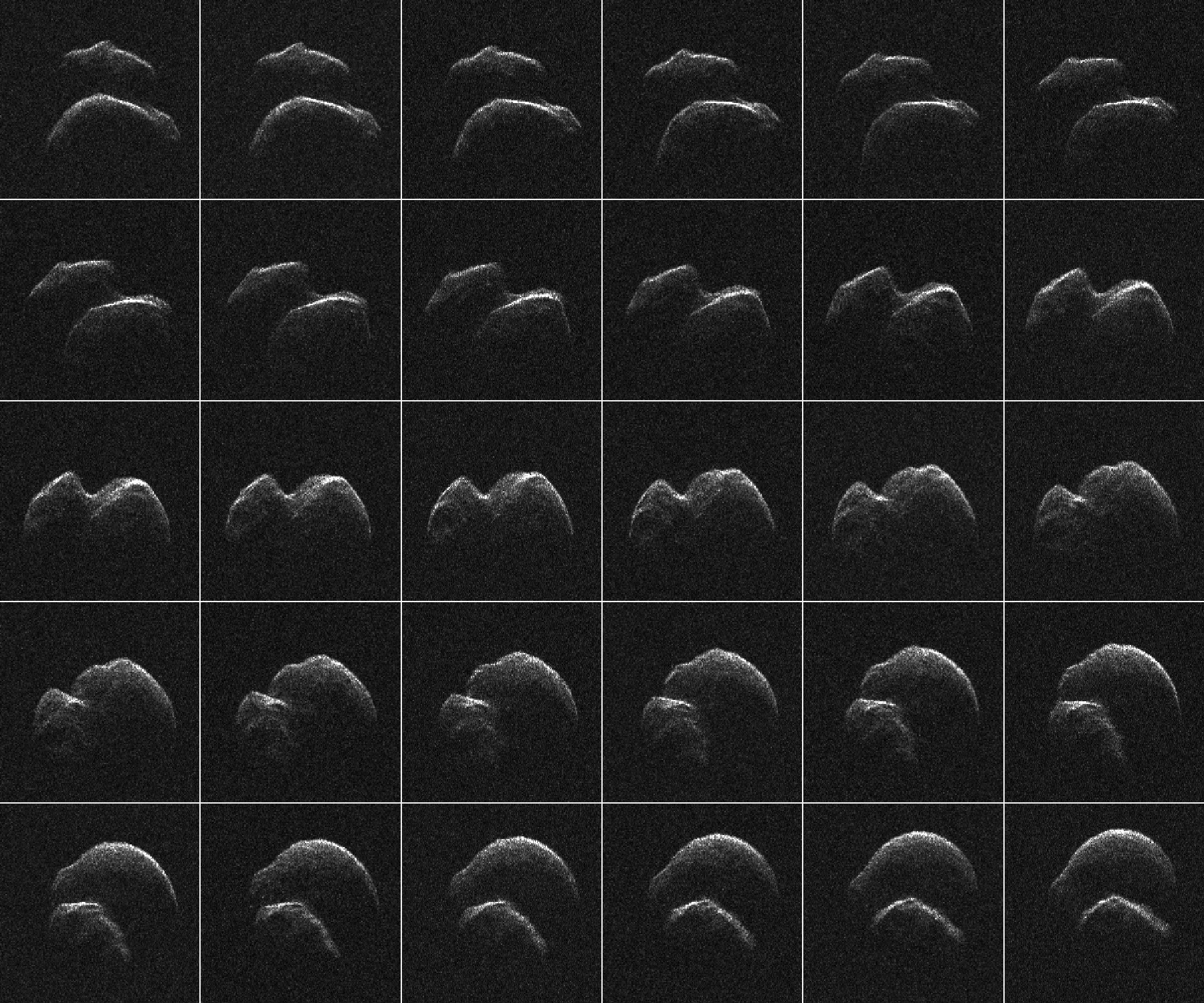
Radar images of 2014 JO_{25}

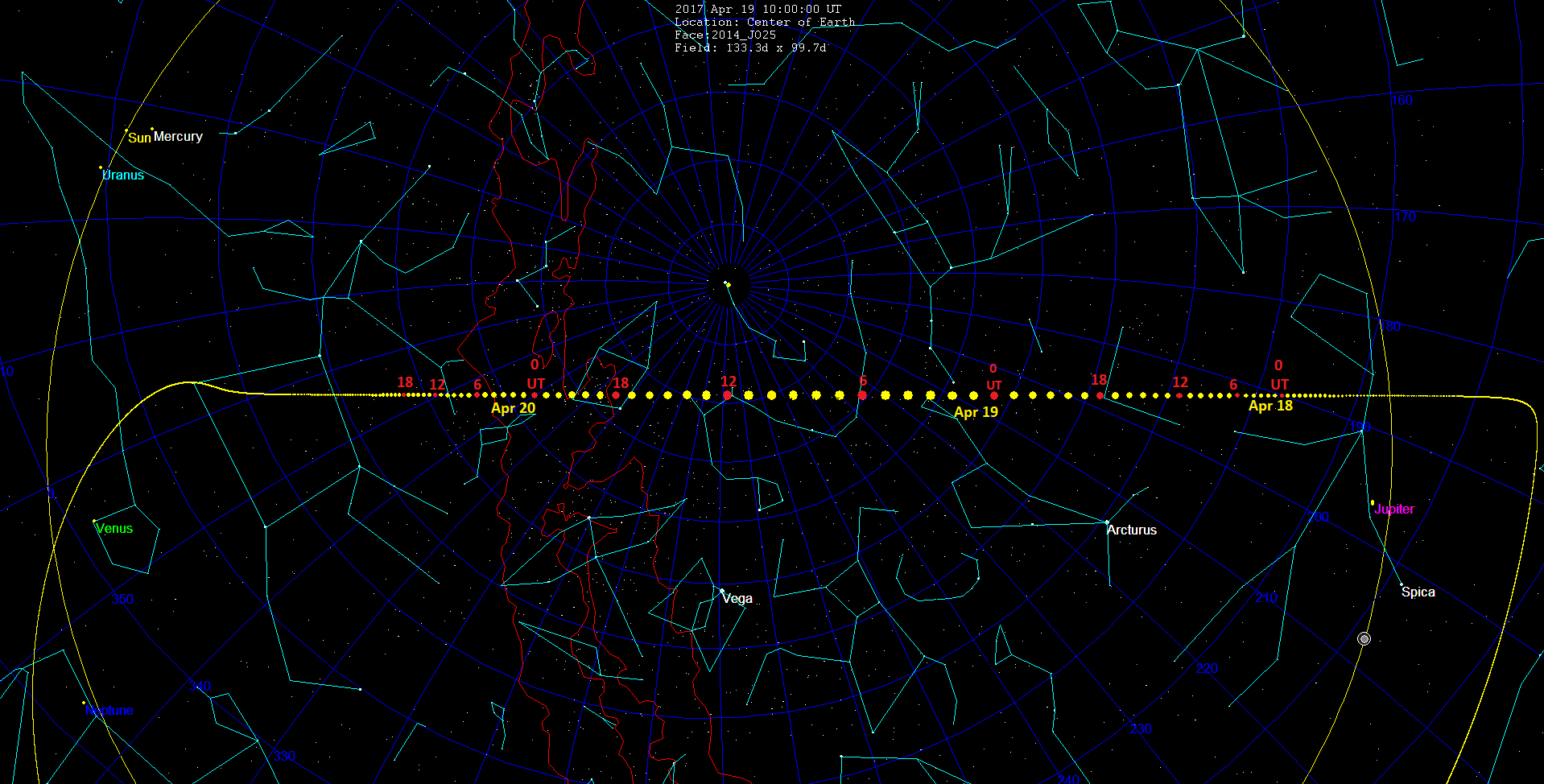
Sky trajectory as hourly motion north of the ecliptic, and in Draco at closest approach

Telescopic view 2017-4-19 22:07:35 - 22:31:07 UTC

== In context ==
2014 JO_{25} on a graph plotting the closest flyby distance to Earth and size of NEOs in 2017.

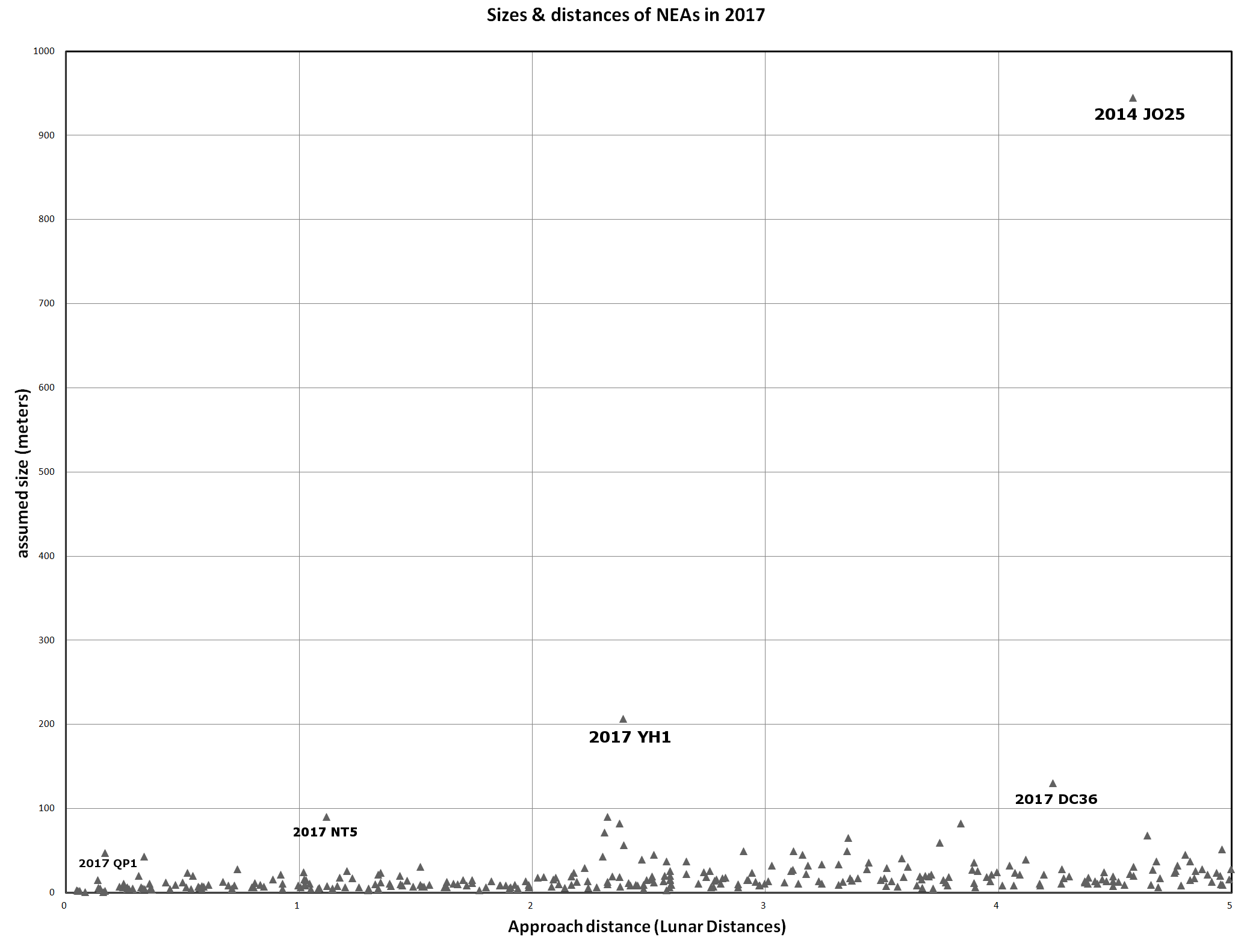
2014 JO_{25} is located in the upper right of the chart.
