= (23187) 2000 PN9 =

Near-Earth asteroid

(23187) 2000 PN_{9}
Discovery
- Discovered by: Lincoln Near-Earth Asteroid Research (LINEAR)
- Discovery site: Lincoln Laboratory Experimental Test Site
- Discovery date: 8 August 2000

Designations
- Minor planet category: NEO · Apollo · PHA

Orbital characteristics
- Epoch 21 November 2025 (JD 2461000.5)
- Uncertainty parameter 0
- Aphelion: 2.93547 AU
- Perihelion: 0.758421 AU
- Semi-major axis: 1.84695 AU
- Eccentricity: 0.589365
- Orbital period (sidereal): 2.51009 y (916.812 d)
- Mean anomaly: 324.539°
- Mean motion: 0.392665° / d
- Inclination: 51.3359°
- Longitude of ascending node: 164.281°
- Argument of perihelion: 293.541°
- Earth MOID: 0.014953 AU
- T_{Jupiter}: 3.419

Physical characteristics
- Dimensions: 1.82±0.08 × 1.82±0.07 × 1.77±0.11 km
- Equatorial radius: 0.855±0.035 km (Note: Given as an equatorial diameter of 1.71±0.07 km)
- Sidereal rotation period: 2.53216±0.00015 h
- Pole ecliptic longitude: 96±36°
- Pole ecliptic latitude: 30±17°
- Spectral type: Sq-type or Q-type
- Absolute magnitude (H): 16.05

(23187) 2000 PN_{9} is an unnamed near-Earth asteroid (NEA) on a highly inclined orbit. An Apollo asteroid, it was discovered on 8 August 2000 by the Lincoln Near-Earth Asteroid Research (LINEAR) program. It is around 1.7 kilometres (1.1 mi) in size and shaped like a top, though its equatorial ridge is less prominent compared to other top-shaped asteroids.

== History ==
2000 PN_{9} was discovered on 8 August 2000 by the Lincoln Near-Earth Asteroid Research (LINEAR) program from the Lincoln Laboratory Experimental Test Site in Socorro, New Mexico, United States. It was given its provisional designation of 2000 PN_{9} by the Minor Planet Center (MPC), and its discovery was announced in a Minor Planet Electronic Circular on 30 August. Once its orbit was sufficiently determined, the MPC numbered it (23187) on 9 March 2001. As of 2025, it has not yet been given a name.

== Orbit ==
2000 PN_{9} orbits the Sun at an average distance—its semi-major axis—of 1.85 astronomical units (AU), taking 2.51 years to complete one revolution. Along its orbit, its distance from the Sun varies between 0.75 AU at perihelion to 2.94 AU at aphelion due to its orbital eccentricity of 0.59. Its orbit is inclined by 51.34° with respect to the ecliptic plane. It is a near-Earth asteroid (NEA) and an Apollo asteroid, since its orbit crosses Earth's and its semi-major axis is greater than one AU. It makes periodic close approaches to Earth, categorizing it as a potentially hazardous asteroid.

== Physical characteristics ==
2000 PN_{9} is 1.71 kilometres (1.06 mi) in size and shaped like a top or diamond, characteristic of rubble pile asteroids. It is nearly spherical, with a less pronounced equatorial ridge compared to other top-shaped NEAs. Based on its surface spectrum, it is classified as an Sq-type or Q-type asteroid. It has no known moons.

Based on observations of 2000 PN_{9}'s lightcurve, or variations in its observed brightness, it has a rotation period of 2.53 hours, rotating in a prograde direction. Its rapid rotation means that its surface likely experiences frequent landslides and mass shedding events that move regolith from its polar regions to its equator. This process exposes unweathered material, and its Sq/Q-type classification could be a consequence of these processes. However, its lack of a satellite is unusual as many top-shaped NEAs have moons; it is one of the largest solitary top-shaped asteroids known. The YORP effect can spin up an NEA towards the spin barrier, at which point a cohesionless rubble pile would break up due to centrifugal forces. Material flung out can then reaccrete, forming a multiple asteroid system. 2000 PN_{9} lies close to the spin barrier, which is around 2.2 hours, but its rotation is not being spun up. Its symmetrical shape means that it has not experienced breakup in the past. This indicates that it may be trapped in a state of rotational equilibrium, where the torque produced by the YORP effect enforces a steady rotation period instead.
