= (163243) 2002 FB3 =

Asteroid

(163243) 2002 FB_{3}
Discovery
- Discovered by: LINEAR
- Discovery site: Lincoln Lab's ETS
- Discovery date: 18 March 2002

Designations
- Minor planet category: Aten · NEO · PHA

Orbital characteristics
- Epoch 23 March 2018 (JD 2458200.5)
- Uncertainty parameter 0
- Observation arc: 16.07 yr (5,869 d)
- Aphelion: 1.2198 AU
- Perihelion: 0.3033 AU
- Semi-major axis: 0.7616 AU
- Eccentricity: 0.6017
- Orbital period (sidereal): 243 days
- Mean anomaly: 150.26°
- Mean motion: 1° 28^{m} 58.8^{s} / day
- Inclination: 20.278°
- Longitude of ascending node: 203.60°
- Argument of perihelion: 148.31°
- Earth MOID: 0.0034 AU (1.3246 LD)

Physical characteristics
- Mean diameter: 1.49 km (calculated); 1.552±0.013 km 1.663±0.285 km 1.682±0.013 km
- Synodic rotation period: 6.231±0.001 h
- Geometric albedo: 0.1426±0.1478; 0.172±0.041; 0.202±0.046; 0.20 (assumed)
- Spectral type: Q
- Absolute magnitude (H): 16.4; 16.50

(163243) 2002 FB_{3} is a stony asteroid on an eccentric orbit, classified as near-Earth object and potentially hazardous asteroid of the Athen group, approximately 1.6 kilometers (1 mile) in diameter. It was discovered on 18 March 2002, by astronomers with the Lincoln Near-Earth Asteroid Research at the Lincoln Laboratory's Experimental Test Site near Socorro, New Mexico, in the United States. The Q-type asteroid has a rotation period of 6.2 hours.

== Orbit and classification ==
2002 FB_{3} is a member of the Athen group of asteroids. It orbits the Sun at a distance of 0.3–1.2 AU once every 8 months (243 days; semi-major axis of 0.76 AU). Its orbit has an eccentricity of 0.60 and an inclination of 20° with respect to the ecliptic. The body's observation arc begins with its official discovery observation at Socorro.

=== Close approaches ===
The asteroid has an Earth minimum orbital intersection distance of 0.0034 AU (509,000 km; 316,000 mi), which corresponds to 1.3 lunar distances and makes it a potentially hazardous asteroid due to its sufficiently large size.

History of close approaches of large near-Earth objects since 1908 ^{(A)}

PHA	Date	Approach distance (lunar dist.)			Abs. mag (H)	Diameter ^{(C)} (m)	Ref ^{(D)}
PHA	Date	Nomi- nal^{(B)}	Mini- mum	Maxi- mum	Abs. mag (H)	Diameter ^{(C)} (m)	Ref ^{(D)}
(33342) 1998 WT24	1908-12-16	3.542	3.537	3.547	17.9	556–1795	data
(458732) 2011 MD5	1918-09-17	0.911	0.909	0.913	17.9	556–1795	data
(7482) 1994 PC1	1933-01-17	2.927	2.927	2.928	16.8	749–1357	data
69230 Hermes	1937-10-30	1.926	1.926	1.927	17.5	668–2158	data
69230 Hermes	1942-04-26	1.651	1.651	1.651	17.5	668–2158	data
(137108) 1999 AN10	1946-08-07	2.432	2.429	2.435	17.9	556–1795	data
(33342) 1998 WT24	1956-12-16	3.523	3.523	3.523	17.9	556–1795	data
(163243) 2002 FB3	1961-04-12	4.903	4.900	4.906	16.4	1669–1695	data
(192642) 1999 RD32	1969-08-27	3.627	3.625	3.630	16.3	1161–3750	data
(143651) 2003 QO104	1981-05-18	2.761	2.760	2.761	16.0	1333–4306	data
2017 CH1	1992-06-05	4.691	3.391	6.037	17.9	556–1795	data
(170086) 2002 XR14	1995-06-24	4.259	4.259	4.260	18.0	531–1714	data
(33342) 1998 WT24	2001-12-16	4.859	4.859	4.859	17.9	556–1795	data
4179 Toutatis	2004-09-29	4.031	4.031	4.031	15.3	2440–2450	data
(671294)2014 JO25	2017-04-19	4.573	4.573	4.573	17.8	582–1879	data
(137108) 1999 AN10	2027-08-07	1.014	1.010	1.019	17.9	556–1795	data
(35396) 1997 XF11	2028-10-26	2.417	2.417	2.418	16.9	881–2845	data
(154276) 2002 SY50	2071-10-30	3.415	3.412	3.418	17.6	714–1406	data
(164121) 2003 YT1	2073-04-29	4.409	4.409	4.409	16.2	1167–2267	data
(385343) 2002 LV	2076-08-04	4.184	4.183	4.185	16.6	1011–3266	data
(52768) 1998 OR2	2079-04-16	4.611	4.611	4.612	15.8	1462–4721	data
(33342) 1998 WT24	2099-12-18	4.919	4.919	4.919	17.9	556–1795	data
(85182) 1991 AQ	2130-01-27	4.140	4.139	4.141	17.1	1100	data
314082 Dryope	2186-07-16	3.709	2.996	4.786	17.5	668–2158	data
(137126) 1999 CF9	2192-08-21	4.970	4.967	4.973	18.0	531–1714	data
(290772) 2005 VC	2198-05-05	1.951	1.791	2.134	17.6	638–2061	data
^{(A)} List includes near-Earth approaches of less than 5 lunar distances (LD) of objects with H brighter than 18.^{(B)} Nominal geocentric distance from the Earth's center to the object's center (Earth radius≈0.017 LD).^{(C)} Diameter: estimated, theoretical mean-diameter based on H and albedo range between X and Y.^{(D)} Reference: data source from the JPL SBDB, with AU converted into LD (1 AU≈390 LD)^{(E)} Color codes: unobserved at close approach observed during close approach upcoming approaches

== Physical characteristics ==
2003 QO_{104} has been characterized as an uncommon Q-type asteroid, that fall into the larger stony S-complex.

=== Rotation period ===
In March 2016, a rotational lightcurve of this asteroid was obtained from photometric observations. Lightcurve analysis gave a rotation period of 6.231 hours with a brightness amplitude of 0.19 magnitude (U=2).

=== Diameter and albedo ===
According to the survey carried out by the NEOWISE mission of NASA's Wide-field Infrared Survey Explorer, measures between 1.552 and 1.682 kilometers in diameter and its surface has an albedo between 0.1426 and 0.202.

The Collaborative Asteroid Lightcurve Link assumes a stony standard albedo of 0.20 and calculates a diameter of 1.49 kilometers based on an absolute magnitude of 16.5.

== Naming ==
This minor planet was numbered by the MPC on 26 September 2007 (M.P.C. 60678). As of 2018, it has not been named.
