= (143651) 2003 QO104 =

Near-Earth object

(143651) 2003 QO_{104}
Discovery
- Discovered by: NEAT
- Discovery site: Haleakala Obs.
- Discovery date: 31 August 2003

Designations
- Minor planet category: NEO · PHA; Apollo · Amor

Orbital characteristics
- Epoch 23 March 2018 (JD 2458200.5)
- Uncertainty parameter 0
- Observation arc: 36.55 yr (13,349 d)
- Aphelion: 3.2551 AU
- Perihelion: 1.0151 AU
- Semi-major axis: 2.1351 AU
- Eccentricity: 0.5246
- Orbital period (sidereal): 3.12 yr (1,140 d)
- Mean anomaly: 297.32°
- Mean motion: 0° 18^{m} 57.24^{s} / day
- Inclination: 11.608°
- Longitude of ascending node: 58.224°
- Argument of perihelion: 183.53°
- Earth MOID: 0.0042 AU (1.6362 LD)

Physical characteristics
- Mean diameter: 1.88 km (calculated); 2.29±0.54 km 2.31 km
- Synodic rotation period: 113.3±0.1 h 114±3 h 114.4±0.1 h (Note: Lightcurve plot of (143651) 2003 QO104 by Brian Warner at the Palmer Divide Observatory. Rotation period 114.4±0.1 hours and a brightness amplitude of 1.60±0.03 mag. Quality code of 3. Summary figures at the LCDB and the observatory's website)
- Geometric albedo: 0.13; 0.137±0.140; 0.14±0.12; 0.20 (assumed)
- Spectral type: Q · S (assumed); B–V = 0.903±0.008; V–R = 0.454±0.011; V–I = 0.797±0.019; B–V = 0.880±0.020; V–R = 0.450±0.020
- Absolute magnitude (H): 16.0; 16.48±0.43

(143651) 2003 QO_{104} is a stony asteroid, slow rotator and suspected tumbler on a highly eccentric orbit, classified as a near-Earth object and potentially hazardous asteroid of the Amor and Apollo group, respectively. It was discovered on 31 August 2003, by astronomers of the Near-Earth Asteroid Tracking program at the Haleakala Observatory in Hawaii, United States. The Q-type asteroid has a rotation period of 114.4 hours and possibly an elongated shape. It measures approximately 2.3 kilometers (1.4 miles) in diameter and is among the largest potentially hazardous asteroids known to exist.

== Orbit and classification ==
2003 QO_{104} is a member of the Apollo group of asteroids, which are Earth-crossing asteroids. They are the largest group of near-Earth objects with approximately 10 thousand known members. As it just grazes the orbit of Earth, the Minor Planet Center (MPC), groups it to the non-Earth crossing Amor asteroids.

It orbits the Sun at a distance of 1.015–3.3 AU once every 3 years and 1 month (1,140 days; semi-major axis of 2.14 AU). Its orbit has an eccentricity of 0.52 and an inclination of 12° with respect to the ecliptic. The body's observation arc begins with a precovery taken at the Siding Spring Observatory on in July 1981, more than 18 years prior to its official discovery observation at Haleakala.

=== Close approaches ===
The asteroid has an Earth minimum orbital intersection distance of 0.0042 AU (628,000 km; 390,000 mi), which corresponds to 1.6 lunar distances and makes it a potentially hazardous asteroid due to its sufficiently large size. On the Torino Scale, this object was rated level 1 in early October 2003, and removed on 13 October 2003.

On 18 May 1985, it passed Earth at a nominal distance of 0.00709 AU (2.76 LD) which translates into 1,060,648 km (659,000 mi) and made another approach in June 2009 at a much larger distance of 37 LD. In 2034, 2037 and 2062, it will pass Earth at a distance of 0.18 AU, 0.44 AU and 0.045 AU, respectively. It frequently approaches Jupiter at 1.7–2.0 AU as well.

History of close approaches of large near-Earth objects since 1908 ^{(A)}

PHA	Date	Approach distance (lunar dist.)			Abs. mag (H)	Diameter ^{(C)} (m)	Ref ^{(D)}
PHA	Date	Nomi- nal^{(B)}	Mini- mum	Maxi- mum	Abs. mag (H)	Diameter ^{(C)} (m)	Ref ^{(D)}
(33342) 1998 WT24	1908-12-16	3.542	3.537	3.547	17.9	556–1795	data
(458732) 2011 MD5	1918-09-17	0.911	0.909	0.913	17.9	556–1795	data
(7482) 1994 PC1	1933-01-17	2.927	2.927	2.928	16.8	749–1357	data
69230 Hermes	1937-10-30	1.926	1.926	1.927	17.5	668–2158	data
69230 Hermes	1942-04-26	1.651	1.651	1.651	17.5	668–2158	data
(137108) 1999 AN10	1946-08-07	2.432	2.429	2.435	17.9	556–1795	data
(33342) 1998 WT24	1956-12-16	3.523	3.523	3.523	17.9	556–1795	data
(163243) 2002 FB3	1961-04-12	4.903	4.900	4.906	16.4	1669–1695	data
(192642) 1999 RD32	1969-08-27	3.627	3.625	3.630	16.3	1161–3750	data
(143651) 2003 QO104	1981-05-18	2.761	2.760	2.761	16.0	1333–4306	data
2017 CH1	1992-06-05	4.691	3.391	6.037	17.9	556–1795	data
(170086) 2002 XR14	1995-06-24	4.259	4.259	4.260	18.0	531–1714	data
(33342) 1998 WT24	2001-12-16	4.859	4.859	4.859	17.9	556–1795	data
4179 Toutatis	2004-09-29	4.031	4.031	4.031	15.3	2440–2450	data
(671294)2014 JO25	2017-04-19	4.573	4.573	4.573	17.8	582–1879	data
(137108) 1999 AN10	2027-08-07	1.014	1.010	1.019	17.9	556–1795	data
(35396) 1997 XF11	2028-10-26	2.417	2.417	2.418	16.9	881–2845	data
(154276) 2002 SY50	2071-10-30	3.415	3.412	3.418	17.6	714–1406	data
(164121) 2003 YT1	2073-04-29	4.409	4.409	4.409	16.2	1167–2267	data
(385343) 2002 LV	2076-08-04	4.184	4.183	4.185	16.6	1011–3266	data
(52768) 1998 OR2	2079-04-16	4.611	4.611	4.612	15.8	1462–4721	data
(33342) 1998 WT24	2099-12-18	4.919	4.919	4.919	17.9	556–1795	data
(85182) 1991 AQ	2130-01-27	4.140	4.139	4.141	17.1	1100	data
314082 Dryope	2186-07-16	3.709	2.996	4.786	17.5	668–2158	data
(137126) 1999 CF9	2192-08-21	4.970	4.967	4.973	18.0	531–1714	data
(290772) 2005 VC	2198-05-05	1.951	1.791	2.134	17.6	638–2061	data
^{(A)} List includes near-Earth approaches of less than 5 lunar distances (LD) of objects with H brighter than 18.^{(B)} Nominal geocentric distance from the Earth's center to the object's center (Earth radius≈0.017 LD).^{(C)} Diameter: estimated, theoretical mean-diameter based on H and albedo range between X and Y.^{(D)} Reference: data source from the JPL SBDB, with AU converted into LD (1 AU≈390 LD)^{(E)} Color codes: unobserved at close approach observed during close approach upcoming approaches

== Physical characteristics ==
2003 QO_{104} has been characterized as an uncommon Q-type asteroid, that falls into the larger stony S-complex.

=== Slow rotator and tumbler ===
Several rotational lightcurve of this asteroid were obtained from photometric observations during its close approach to the Earth in 2009. Analysis of the best-rated lightcurve – obtained by Brian Warner at his Palmer Divide Observatory in collaboration with Robert Stephens and Albino Carbognani – gave a well-defined rotation period of 114.4 hours with a high brightness amplitude of 1.60 magnitude (U=3), which is indicative of an elongated shape. With a period of more than 100 hours, 2003 QO_{104} is a slow rotator as most asteroids typically rotate every 2 to 20 hours once around their axis. The asteroid also shows several characteristics of a non-principal axis-rotation, which is commonly known as tumbling.

This asteroid has also been studied by radar at the Goldstone and Arecibo observatories by Lance Benner and Mike Nolan. (Note: Radiometric observations of (143651) 2003 QO104 at the Arecibo Observatory by Mike Nolan R2421 in May 2009, and at the Goldstone Observatory by Lance Benner Planning in June 2009)

=== Diameter and albedo ===
According to post-cryogenic observations made by the Spitzer Space Telescope during the ExploreNEOs survey, this asteroid measures 2.29 and 2.31 kilometers in diameter and its surface has an albedo between 0.13 and 0.14, while the Collaborative Asteroid Lightcurve Link assumes a standard albedo for stony asteroids of 0.20 and calculates a diameter of 1.88 kilometers based on an absolute magnitude of 16.0.

== Naming ==
This minor planet was numbered by the MPC on 5 December 2006 (M.P.C. 58189). As of 2018, it has not been named.
