= (85182) 1991 AQ =

Near-Earth asteroid

Discovery
- Discovered by: E. F. Helin
- Discovery site: Palomar Obs.
- Discovery date: 14 January 1991

Designations
- Alternative designations: 1994 RD
- Minor planet category: Apollo · NEO · PHA

Orbital characteristics
- Epoch 23 March 2018 (JD 2458200.5)
- Uncertainty parameter 0
- Observation arc: 26.91 yr (9,829 d)
- Aphelion: 3.9474 AU
- Perihelion: 0.4960 AU
- Semi-major axis: 2.2217 AU
- Eccentricity: 0.7768
- Orbital period (sidereal): 3.31 yr (1,210 d)
- Mean anomaly: 64.916°
- Mean motion: 0° 17^{m} 51.36^{s} / day
- Inclination: 3.1276°
- Longitude of ascending node: 339.68°
- Argument of perihelion: 242.96°
- Earth MOID: 0.0165 AU (6.428 LD)

Physical characteristics
- Mean diameter: 1.1 km 1.14 km (derived)
- Geometric albedo: 0.18 (assumed); 0.242±0.194
- Spectral type: Q (Tholen)
- Absolute magnitude (H): 17.1; 17.20

(85182) 1991 AQ is a stony asteroid on a highly eccentric orbit, classified as a near-Earth object and potentially hazardous asteroid of the Apollo group, approximately 1.1 kilometers (0.7 miles) in diameter. It was discovered on 14 January 1991, by American astronomer Eleanor Helin at the Palomar Observatory in California. Based on its brightness variation of 0.69 magnitude, this Q-type asteroid is likely elongated. It belongs to the small group of potentially hazardous asteroids larger than one kilometer.

== Orbit and classification ==
1991 AQ is a member of the Earth-crossing class of Apollo asteroids, the largest group of near-Earth objects with approximately 10 thousand known members. It is also a Venus- and Mars-crosser due to its extreme perihelion and aphelion, respectively.

It orbits the Sun at a distance of 0.5–3.9 AU once every 3 years and 4 months (1,210 days; semi-major axis of 2.22 AU). Its orbit has a high eccentricity of 0.78 and an inclination of 3° with respect to the ecliptic. The body's observation arc begins with its official discovery observation at Palomar in 1991.

=== Close approaches ===
The asteroid has currently an Earth minimum orbital intersection distance of 0.0165 AU (2,470,000 km; 1,530,000 mi), which corresponds to 6.4 lunar distances and makes it a potentially hazardous asteroid due to its notably large size. In 1991 and 1994, it approached Earth at a nominal distance of 0.054 AU (21 LD). The asteroids closest encounter with Earth is projected to occur on 27 January 2130, at a distance of 0.0106 AU (4.1 LD) only (see table). It also makes close encounters to Mercury, Venus, Mars and Jupiter.

History of close approaches of large near-Earth objects since 1908 ^{(A)}

PHA	Date	Approach distance (lunar dist.)			Abs. mag (H)	Diameter ^{(C)} (m)	Ref ^{(D)}
PHA	Date	Nomi- nal^{(B)}	Mini- mum	Maxi- mum	Abs. mag (H)	Diameter ^{(C)} (m)	Ref ^{(D)}
(33342) 1998 WT24	1908-12-16	3.542	3.537	3.547	17.9	556–1795	data
(458732) 2011 MD5	1918-09-17	0.911	0.909	0.913	17.9	556–1795	data
(7482) 1994 PC1	1933-01-17	2.927	2.927	2.928	16.8	749–1357	data
69230 Hermes	1937-10-30	1.926	1.926	1.927	17.5	668–2158	data
69230 Hermes	1942-04-26	1.651	1.651	1.651	17.5	668–2158	data
(137108) 1999 AN10	1946-08-07	2.432	2.429	2.435	17.9	556–1795	data
(33342) 1998 WT24	1956-12-16	3.523	3.523	3.523	17.9	556–1795	data
(163243) 2002 FB3	1961-04-12	4.903	4.900	4.906	16.4	1669–1695	data
(192642) 1999 RD32	1969-08-27	3.627	3.625	3.630	16.3	1161–3750	data
(143651) 2003 QO104	1981-05-18	2.761	2.760	2.761	16.0	1333–4306	data
2017 CH1	1992-06-05	4.691	3.391	6.037	17.9	556–1795	data
(170086) 2002 XR14	1995-06-24	4.259	4.259	4.260	18.0	531–1714	data
(33342) 1998 WT24	2001-12-16	4.859	4.859	4.859	17.9	556–1795	data
4179 Toutatis	2004-09-29	4.031	4.031	4.031	15.3	2440–2450	data
(671294)2014 JO25	2017-04-19	4.573	4.573	4.573	17.8	582–1879	data
(137108) 1999 AN10	2027-08-07	1.014	1.010	1.019	17.9	556–1795	data
(35396) 1997 XF11	2028-10-26	2.417	2.417	2.418	16.9	881–2845	data
(154276) 2002 SY50	2071-10-30	3.415	3.412	3.418	17.6	714–1406	data
(164121) 2003 YT1	2073-04-29	4.409	4.409	4.409	16.2	1167–2267	data
(385343) 2002 LV	2076-08-04	4.184	4.183	4.185	16.6	1011–3266	data
(52768) 1998 OR2	2079-04-16	4.611	4.611	4.612	15.8	1462–4721	data
(33342) 1998 WT24	2099-12-18	4.919	4.919	4.919	17.9	556–1795	data
(85182) 1991 AQ	2130-01-27	4.140	4.139	4.141	17.1	1100	data
314082 Dryope	2186-07-16	3.709	2.996	4.786	17.5	668–2158	data
(137126) 1999 CF9	2192-08-21	4.970	4.967	4.973	18.0	531–1714	data
(290772) 2005 VC	2198-05-05	1.951	1.791	2.134	17.6	638–2061	data
^{(A)} List includes near-Earth approaches of less than 5 lunar distances (LD) of objects with H brighter than 18.^{(B)} Nominal geocentric distance from the Earth's center to the object's center (Earth radius≈0.017 LD).^{(C)} Diameter: estimated, theoretical mean-diameter based on H and albedo range between X and Y.^{(D)} Reference: data source from the JPL SBDB, with AU converted into LD (1 AU≈390 LD)^{(E)} Color codes: unobserved at close approach observed during close approach upcoming approaches

== Physical characteristics ==
In the Tholen classification, this object is an uncommon Q-type asteroid, that falls into the larger stony S-complex. As of 2018, no rotational lightcurve of this asteroid has been obtained from photometric observations. The body's rotation period, pole and shape remain unknown. It has a brightness variation of 0.69 magnitude, indicative for an elongated, non-spherical shape.

=== Diameter and albedo ===
According to the survey carried out by the NEOWISE mission of NASA's Wide-field Infrared Survey Explorer, this asteroid measures 1.1 kilometers in diameter and its surface has an albedo of 0.242. The Collaborative Asteroid Lightcurve Link assumes an albedo of 0.18 and derives a diameter of 1.14 kilometers based on an absolute magnitude of 17.20.

== Numbering and naming ==
This minor planet was numbered by the Minor Planet Center on 30 August 2004 (M.P.C. 52517). As of 2018, it has not been named.
