= (7482) 1994 PC1 =

Near-Earth asteroid

(7482) 1994 PC_{1}
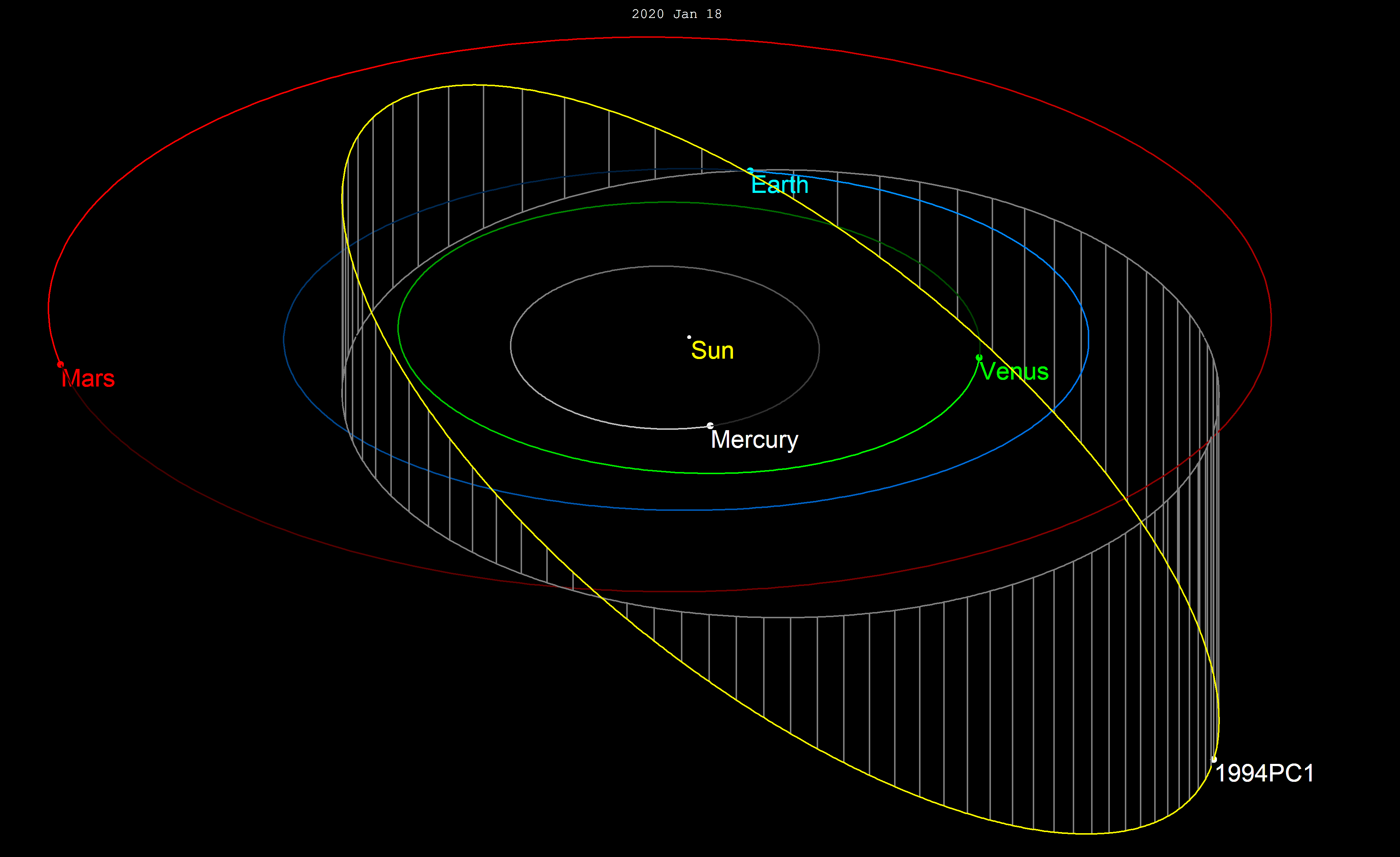
- Orbit with positions Jan 2020

Discovery
- Discovered by: R. H. McNaught
- Discovery site: Siding Spring Obs.
- Discovery date: 9 August 1994

Designations
- Minor planet category: Apollo · NEO · PHA

Orbital characteristics
- Epoch 2022-Jan-21 (JD 2459600.5)
- Uncertainty parameter 0
- Observation arc: 47.23 yr (17,251 days)
- Earliest precovery date: 22 September 1974
- Aphelion: 1.7935 AU
- Perihelion: 0.9042 AU
- Semi-major axis: 1.3488 AU
- Eccentricity: 0.3297
- Orbital period (sidereal): 1.56 yr (572 days)
- Mean anomaly: 337.27°
- Mean motion: 0° 37^{m} 51.6^{s} / day
- Inclination: 33.479°
- Longitude of ascending node: 117.88°
- Argument of perihelion: 47.477°
- Earth MOID: 0.00054 AU (0.21 LD)
- Mars MOID: 0.139 AU (20.8 million km)

Physical characteristics
- Mean diameter: 1.052±0.303 km 1.30 km (calculated)
- Synodic rotation period: 2.5999 h
- Geometric albedo: 0.277±0.185; 0.20 (assumed)
- Spectral type: SMASS = S
- Absolute magnitude (H): 16.6 · 16.80±0.3

(7482) 1994 PC_{1} is a stony asteroid and near-Earth object, currently estimated to be the most potentially hazardous asteroid over the next 1000 years. It is in the Apollo group, approximately 1.1 kilometers in diameter. It was discovered on 9 August 1994, by astronomer Robert McNaught at the Siding Spring Observatory in Coonabarabran, Australia. With an observation arc of 47 years it has a very well known orbit and was observed by Goldstone radar in January 1997.

Of all the known asteroids larger than 1 km, 1994 PC_{1} has the largest probability of a "deep close encounter" with Earth over the next 1000 years. It has a close encounter with Earth in 2525, after which the uncertainty of its orbit increases.

== Orbit and classification ==
1994 PC_{1} orbits the Sun at a distance of 0.9–1.8 AU once every 1 years and 7 months (572 days). Its orbit has an eccentricity of 0.33 and an inclination of 33° with respect to the ecliptic.

On 17 January 1933, it passed 811,350 km (504,150 mi) from the Moon and then about an hour later made its closest known approach to Earth of 1,125,400 km (699,300 mi). On 18 January 2022, it passed about 1,981,468 km (1,231,227 mi) from Earth.

Close approaches
Date	JPL SBDB nominal geocentric distance	uncertainty region (3-sigma)
1933-01-17	1125383 km	± 65 km (Note: The 1933 approach is better constrained than the 2105 approach as a result of the 1974, 1977, 1980 precovery images of the asteroid.)
2022-01-18	1981468 km	± 47 km
2105-01-18	2328125 km	± 1069 km

== Physical characteristics ==
In the SMASS classification, 1994 PC_{1} is a common stony S-type asteroid.

=== Rotation period ===
In 1998, a rotational lightcurve of 1994 PC_{1} was obtained from photometric observations by Petr Pravec. Lightcurve analysis gave a well-defined rotation period of 2.5999 hours with a brightness amplitude of 0.29 magnitude (U=3).

=== Diameter and albedo ===
According to the survey carried out by the NEOWISE mission of NASA's Wide-field Infrared Survey Explorer, 1994 PC_{1} measures 1.052 kilometers in diameter and its surface has an albedo of 0.277. The Collaborative Asteroid Lightcurve Link assumes an albedo of 0.20 and calculates a diameter of 1.30 kilometers based on an absolute magnitude of 16.8.

== 2022 flyby ==
At 18 January 2022 21:51 UTC, 1994 PC_{1} passed 5.15 lunar distances from Earth and had a 3-sigma uncertainty region of less than ± 50 km. It peaked at an apparent magnitude of about 10 placing it just outside the reach of common 7×50 binoculars. The nearly full moon being about 100 degrees from the asteroid during closest approach may have made it more difficult to observe with smaller telescopes.

2022 Moon/Earth approach
Date & Time	Approach to	Nominal distance
2022-01-18 18:58	Moon	2085780 km
2022-01-18 21:51	Earth	1981468 km

Animation of 1994 PC_{1} - 2022 close approach Sun · Earth · 1994 PC_{1}

Sky trajectory with daily motion
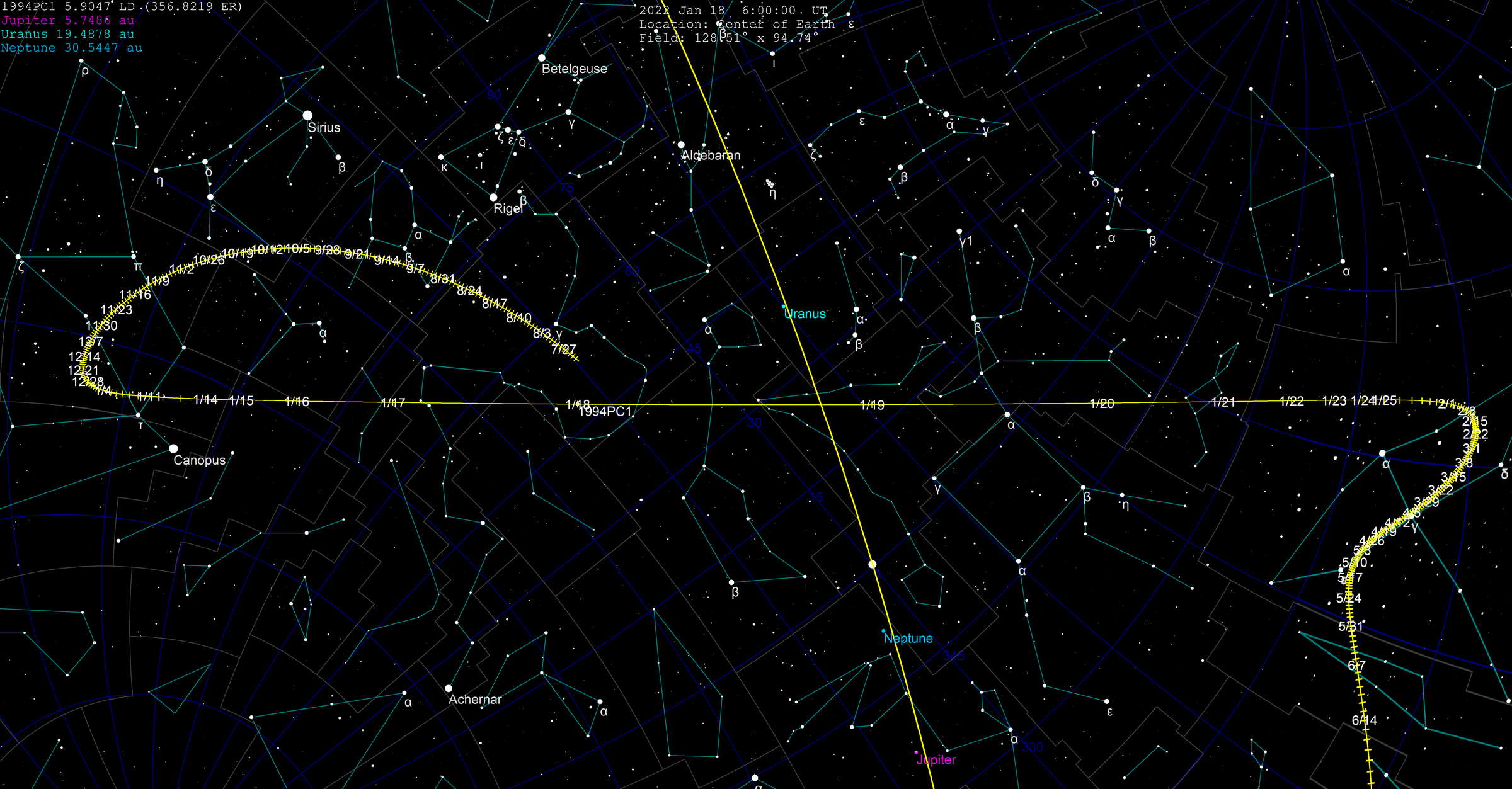

History of close approaches of large near-Earth objects since 1908 ^{(A)}

PHA	Date	Approach distance (lunar dist.)			Abs. mag (H)	Diameter ^{(C)} (m)	Ref ^{(D)}
PHA	Date	Nomi- nal^{(B)}	Mini- mum	Maxi- mum	Abs. mag (H)	Diameter ^{(C)} (m)	Ref ^{(D)}
(33342) 1998 WT24	1908-12-16	3.542	3.537	3.547	17.9	556–1795	data
(458732) 2011 MD5	1918-09-17	0.911	0.909	0.913	17.9	556–1795	data
(7482) 1994 PC1	1933-01-17	2.927	2.927	2.928	16.8	749–1357	data
69230 Hermes	1937-10-30	1.926	1.926	1.927	17.5	668–2158	data
69230 Hermes	1942-04-26	1.651	1.651	1.651	17.5	668–2158	data
(137108) 1999 AN10	1946-08-07	2.432	2.429	2.435	17.9	556–1795	data
(33342) 1998 WT24	1956-12-16	3.523	3.523	3.523	17.9	556–1795	data
(163243) 2002 FB3	1961-04-12	4.903	4.900	4.906	16.4	1669–1695	data
(192642) 1999 RD32	1969-08-27	3.627	3.625	3.630	16.3	1161–3750	data
(143651) 2003 QO104	1981-05-18	2.761	2.760	2.761	16.0	1333–4306	data
2017 CH1	1992-06-05	4.691	3.391	6.037	17.9	556–1795	data
(170086) 2002 XR14	1995-06-24	4.259	4.259	4.260	18.0	531–1714	data
(33342) 1998 WT24	2001-12-16	4.859	4.859	4.859	17.9	556–1795	data
4179 Toutatis	2004-09-29	4.031	4.031	4.031	15.3	2440–2450	data
(671294)2014 JO25	2017-04-19	4.573	4.573	4.573	17.8	582–1879	data
(137108) 1999 AN10	2027-08-07	1.014	1.010	1.019	17.9	556–1795	data
(35396) 1997 XF11	2028-10-26	2.417	2.417	2.418	16.9	881–2845	data
(154276) 2002 SY50	2071-10-30	3.415	3.412	3.418	17.6	714–1406	data
(164121) 2003 YT1	2073-04-29	4.409	4.409	4.409	16.2	1167–2267	data
(385343) 2002 LV	2076-08-04	4.184	4.183	4.185	16.6	1011–3266	data
(52768) 1998 OR2	2079-04-16	4.611	4.611	4.612	15.8	1462–4721	data
(33342) 1998 WT24	2099-12-18	4.919	4.919	4.919	17.9	556–1795	data
(85182) 1991 AQ	2130-01-27	4.140	4.139	4.141	17.1	1100	data
314082 Dryope	2186-07-16	3.709	2.996	4.786	17.5	668–2158	data
(137126) 1999 CF9	2192-08-21	4.970	4.967	4.973	18.0	531–1714	data
(290772) 2005 VC	2198-05-05	1.951	1.791	2.134	17.6	638–2061	data
^{(A)} List includes near-Earth approaches of less than 5 lunar distances (LD) of objects with H brighter than 18.^{(B)} Nominal geocentric distance from the Earth's center to the object's center (Earth radius≈0.017 LD).^{(C)} Diameter: estimated, theoretical mean-diameter based on H and albedo range between X and Y.^{(D)} Reference: data source from the JPL SBDB, with AU converted into LD (1 AU≈390 LD)^{(E)} Color codes: unobserved at close approach observed during close approach upcoming approaches

== Naming ==
As of 2022, this minor planet has not been named.

== See also ==
- List of asteroid close approaches to Earth in 2022
- (671294) 2014 JO25 – ~800 meters in diameter and passed 4.57 LD from Earth on 19 April 2017
- (153814) 2001 WN5 – ~900 meters in diameter and will pass 0.65 LD from Earth on 26 June 2028
