= 69230 Hermes =

Sub-kilometer sized asteroid and binary system on an eccentric orbit

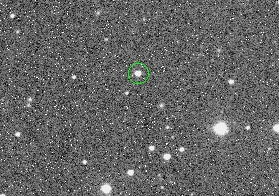
- Recovery of Hermes on 15 October 2003

Discovery
- Discovered by: K. Reinmuth
- Discovery site: Heidelberg Obs.
- Discovery date: 28 October 1937

Designations
- Pronunciation: /ˈhɜːrmiːz/
- Named after: Hermes (Greek mythology)
- Alternative designations: 1937 UB
- Minor planet category: NEO · PHA · Apollo; Mars- and Venus-crosser
- Adjectives: Hermian, Hermean /ˈhɜːrmiən, hərˈmiːən/

Orbital characteristics
- Epoch 27 April 2019 (JD 2458600.5)
- Uncertainty parameter 0
- Observation arc: 80.94 yr (29,565 d)
- Earliest precovery date: 25 October 1937
- Aphelion: 2.6878 AU
- Perihelion: 0.6226 AU
- Semi-major axis: 1.6552 AU
- Eccentricity: 0.6239
- Orbital period (sidereal): 2.13 yr (778 d)
- Mean anomaly: 73.583°
- Mean motion: 0° 27^{m} 46.08^{s} / day
- Inclination: 6.0670°
- Longitude of ascending node: 34.217°
- Argument of perihelion: 92.746°
- Known satellites: 1 (P:13.892±0.006 h) (D: 0.54 km, 0.56 km)
- Earth MOID: 0.0043 AU (1.6752 LD)

Physical characteristics
- Mean diameter: 0.8±0.1 km 0.81 km (derived); 0.85 km
- Mean density: 1.6 g/cm^{3} (assumed)
- Synodic rotation period: 13.894 h (Note: Lightcurve plot of (69230) Hermes, Palmer Divide Observatory, Brian D. Warner (2003). Summary figures at LCDB.)
- Geometric albedo: 0.25±0.12; 0.265±0.099
- Spectral type: S (Note: Infrared spectroscopic observations of 69230 Hermes (1937 UB): possible unweathered endmember among ordinary chondrite analogs) · Sq
- Absolute magnitude (H): 17.48; 17.5; 17.55; 17.57

69230 Hermes is a sub-kilometer sized asteroid and binary system on an eccentric orbit, classified as a potentially hazardous asteroid and near-Earth object of the Apollo group, that passed Earth at approximately twice the distance of the Moon on 30 October 1937. The asteroid was named after Hermes from Greek mythology. It is noted for having been the last remaining named lost asteroid, rediscovered in 2003. The S-type asteroid has a rotation period of 13.9 hours. Its synchronous companion was discovered in 2003. The primary and secondary are separated by 1.1 km (0.68 mi) and are similar in size; they measure approximately 600 ± 120 meters (2,000 ± 390 ft) and 540 ± 120 m (1,800 ± 390 ft) in diameter, respectively, with a combined effective diameter of 810 m (2,700 ft).

== Discovery ==
Hermes was discovered by German astronomer Karl Reinmuth in images taken at Heidelberg Observatory on 28 October 1937. Only four days of observations could be made before it became too faint to be seen in the telescopes of the day. This was not enough to calculate an orbit, and Hermes became a lost asteroid. It thus did not receive a number, but Reinmuth nevertheless named it after the Greek god Hermes. It was the third unnumbered but named asteroid, having only the provisional designation 1937 UB. The two others long lost were (1862) Apollo, discovered in 1932 and numbered in 1973, and (2101) Adonis, discovered in 1936 and numbered in 1977.

On 15 October 2003, Brian A. Skiff of the LONEOS project made an asteroid observation that, when the orbit was calculated backwards in time (by Timothy B. Spahr, Steven Chesley and Paul Chodas), turned out to be a rediscovery of Hermes. It has been assigned sequential number 69230. Additional precovery observations were published by the Minor Planet Center, the earliest being found in images taken serendipitously by the MPG/ESO 2.2-m La Silla telescope on 16 September 2000.

== Naming ==
This minor planet was named after the Greek god Hermes, who is the messenger of the gods and son of Zeus and Maia (see also 5731 and 66). Recovered and numbered in late 2003, Hermes was originally named by the Astronomical Calculation Institute as early as 1937. The official naming citation was published by the Minor Planet Center on 9 November 2003 (M.P.C. 50255).

== Orbit and classification ==
Hermes is an Apollo asteroid, a subgroup of near-Earth asteroids that cross the orbit of Earth. It orbits the Sun at a distance of 0.6–2.7 AU once every 2 years and 2 months (778 days; semi-major axis of 1.66 AU). Its orbit has an eccentricity of 0.62 and an inclination of 6° with respect to the ecliptic. Due to its eccentricity, Hermes is also a Mars- and Venus-crosser. Frequent close approaches to both Earth and Venus make it unusually challenging to forecast its orbit more than a century in advance, though there is no impact risk within that timeframe.

=== Close approaches ===
Animation of 69230 Hermes's orbit - close approach in 1942 Sun · Earth · 69230 Hermes

The asteroid has an Earth minimum orbital intersection distance of 0.0041 AU (610,000 km) which translates into 1.6 LD. On 30 October 1937, Hermes passed 0.00494 AU (739,000 km) from Earth, and on 26 April 1942, 0.0042415 AU (634,520 km) from Earth. In retrospect it turned out that Hermes came even closer to the Earth in 1942 than in 1937, within 1.7 lunar distances; the second pass was unobserved at the height of the Second World War. For decades, Hermes was known to have made the closest known approach of an asteroid to the Earth. Not until 1989 was a closer approach (by 4581 Asclepius) observed. At closest approach, Hermes was moving 5° per hour across the sky and reached 8th magnitude.

History of close approaches of large near-Earth objects since 1908 ^{(A)}

| PHA | Date | Approach distance (lunar dist.) | | | Abs. mag (H) | Diameter ^{(C)} (m) | Ref ^{(D)} |
| PHA | Date | Nomi- nal^{(B)} | Mini- mum | Maxi- mum | Abs. mag (H) | Diameter ^{(C)} (m) | Ref ^{(D)} |
|---|---|---|---|---|---|---|---|
| (33342) 1998 WT24 | 1908-12-16 | 3.542 | 3.537 | 3.547 | 17.9 | 556–1795 | data |
| (458732) 2011 MD5 | 1918-09-17 | 0.911 | 0.909 | 0.913 | 17.9 | 556–1795 | data |
| (7482) 1994 PC1 | 1933-01-17 | 2.927 | 2.927 | 2.928 | 16.8 | 749–1357 | data |
| 69230 Hermes | 1937-10-30 | 1.926 | 1.926 | 1.927 | 17.5 | 668–2158 | data |
| 69230 Hermes | 1942-04-26 | 1.651 | 1.651 | 1.651 | 17.5 | 668–2158 | data |
| (137108) 1999 AN10 | 1946-08-07 | 2.432 | 2.429 | 2.435 | 17.9 | 556–1795 | data |
| (33342) 1998 WT24 | 1956-12-16 | 3.523 | 3.523 | 3.523 | 17.9 | 556–1795 | data |
| (163243) 2002 FB3 | 1961-04-12 | 4.903 | 4.900 | 4.906 | 16.4 | 1669–1695 | data |
| (192642) 1999 RD32 | 1969-08-27 | 3.627 | 3.625 | 3.630 | 16.3 | 1161–3750 | data |
| (143651) 2003 QO104 | 1981-05-18 | 2.761 | 2.760 | 2.761 | 16.0 | 1333–4306 | data |
| 2017 CH1 | 1992-06-05 | 4.691 | 3.391 | 6.037 | 17.9 | 556–1795 | data |
| (170086) 2002 XR14 | 1995-06-24 | 4.259 | 4.259 | 4.260 | 18.0 | 531–1714 | data |
| (33342) 1998 WT24 | 2001-12-16 | 4.859 | 4.859 | 4.859 | 17.9 | 556–1795 | data |
| 4179 Toutatis | 2004-09-29 | 4.031 | 4.031 | 4.031 | 15.3 | 2440–2450 | data |
| (671294)2014 JO25 | 2017-04-19 | 4.573 | 4.573 | 4.573 | 17.8 | 582–1879 | data |
| (137108) 1999 AN10 | 2027-08-07 | 1.014 | 1.010 | 1.019 | 17.9 | 556–1795 | data |
| (35396) 1997 XF11 | 2028-10-26 | 2.417 | 2.417 | 2.418 | 16.9 | 881–2845 | data |
| (154276) 2002 SY50 | 2071-10-30 | 3.415 | 3.412 | 3.418 | 17.6 | 714–1406 | data |
| (164121) 2003 YT1 | 2073-04-29 | 4.409 | 4.409 | 4.409 | 16.2 | 1167–2267 | data |
| (385343) 2002 LV | 2076-08-04 | 4.184 | 4.183 | 4.185 | 16.6 | 1011–3266 | data |
| (52768) 1998 OR2 | 2079-04-16 | 4.611 | 4.611 | 4.612 | 15.8 | 1462–4721 | data |
| (33342) 1998 WT24 | 2099-12-18 | 4.919 | 4.919 | 4.919 | 17.9 | 556–1795 | data |
| (85182) 1991 AQ | 2130-01-27 | 4.140 | 4.139 | 4.141 | 17.1 | 1100 | data |
| 314082 Dryope | 2186-07-16 | 3.709 | 2.996 | 4.786 | 17.5 | 668–2158 | data |
| (137126) 1999 CF9 | 2192-08-21 | 4.970 | 4.967 | 4.973 | 18.0 | 531–1714 | data |
| (290772) 2005 VC | 2198-05-05 | 1.951 | 1.791 | 2.134 | 17.6 | 638–2061 | data |
^{(A)} List includes near-Earth approaches of less than 5 lunar distances (LD) of objects with H brighter than 18.^{(B)} Nominal geocentric distance from the Earth's center to the object's center (Earth radius≈0.017 LD).^{(C)} Diameter: estimated, theoretical mean-diameter based on H and albedo range between X and Y.^{(D)} Reference: data source from the JPL SBDB, with AU converted into LD (1 AU≈390 LD)^{(E)} Color codes: unobserved at close approach observed during close approach upcoming approaches

== Physical characteristics ==
=== Spectral type ===
Hermes is a stony S-type asteroid, as reported by Andy Rivkin and Richard Binzel. It has been characterized as a Sq-subtype using the SpeX instrument at NASA Infrared Telescope Facility. Sq-types transition to the Q-type asteroid.

=== Lightcurves ===
Three rotational lightcurves of Hermes were obtained from photometric observations in October 2003. Lightcurve analysis gave a well-defined rotation period between 13.892 and 13.894 hours with a brightness variation between and 0.06 and 0.08 magnitude, which indicates that the body has a nearly spherical shape (U=3/3/3).

== Binary system ==
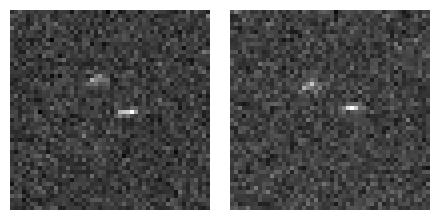
Arecibo radar image from 19 October 2003, showing the relative motion of the components.

Radar observations led by Jean-Luc Margot at Arecibo Observatory and Goldstone in October and November 2003 showed Hermes to be a binary asteroid. The primary and secondary components have nearly identical radii of 315 m (1,033 ft) and 280 m (920 ft), respectively, and their orbital separation is only 1,200 metres, much smaller than the Hill radius of 35 km.

The two components are in double synchronous rotation (similar to the trans-Neptunian system Pluto and Charon). Hermes is one of only four systems of that kind known in the near-Earth object population. The other three are 1994 CJ1, (190166) 2005 UP156, and 2017 YE5.
