= (35396) 1997 XF11 =

Asteroid of the Apollo group

(35396) 1997 XF_{11}
Discovery
- Discovered by: Spacewatch
- Discovery site: Kitt Peak National Obs.
- Discovery date: 6 December 1997

Designations
- Minor planet category: Apollo; NEO; PHA

Orbital characteristics
- Epoch 13 September 2023 (JD 2453300.5)
- Uncertainty parameter 0
- Observation arc: 33.19 yr (12,121 days)
- Aphelion: 2.139 AU (320.0 million km)
- Perihelion: 0.7446 AU (111.39 million km)
- Semi-major axis: 1.442 AU (215.7 million km)
- Eccentricity: 0.48369
- Orbital period (sidereal): 1.73 yr (633 days)
- Mean anomaly: 44.44°
- Mean motion: 0° 34^{m} 7.68^{s} / day
- Inclination: 4.0995°
- Longitude of ascending node: 213.65°
- Time of perihelion: 26 June 2023
- Argument of perihelion: 103.06°
- Earth MOID: 0.0003 AU (45 thousand km)

Physical characteristics
- Mean diameter: 0.704±0.103 km; 0.940±0.480 km; 1.39 km (derived)
- Synodic rotation period: 3.252±0.002 h; 3.253±0.002 h; 3.2566±0.0002 h; 3.25765±0.00005 h; 3.259 h; 3.2591±0.0025 h
- Geometric albedo: 0.18 (assumed); 0.29±0.21; 0.7727±0.2436
- Spectral type: SMASS = Xk; X
- Absolute magnitude (H): 16.66; 16.66±0.40; 16.77; 16.77±0.08; 16.9; 17.11±0.22

(35396) 1997 XF_{11} is a kilometer-sized asteroid, classified as a near-Earth object, Mars-crosser and potentially hazardous asteroid of the Apollo group.

2028 Earth/Moon approach
Date & Time	Approach to	Nominal distance	uncertainty region (3-sigma)
2028-Oct-26 06:44	Earth	929253 km	± 106 km
2028-Oct-26 07:39	Moon	1326430 km	± 106 km

== Description ==
Three months after its discovery on 6 December 1997 by James V. Scotti of the University of Arizona's Spacewatch Project, the asteroid was predicted to make an exceptionally close approach to Earth on 28 October 2028. Additional precovery observations of the asteroid from 1990 were quickly found that refined the orbit and it is now known the asteroid will pass Earth on 26 October 2028, at a distance of 929,000 km (2.42 LD). During the close approach, the asteroid should peak at about apparent magnitude 8.2, and will be visible in binoculars.

1997 XF_{11} measures between 0.7 and 1.4 kilometers in diameter.

This asteroid also regularly comes near the large asteroid Pallas.

=== IAU Circular ===
On 11 March 1998, using a three-month observation arc, a faulty International Astronomical Union circular and press information sheet were put out that incorrectly concluded "that the asteroid was 'virtually certain' to pass within 80% of the distance to the Moon and stood a 'small...not entirely out of the question' possibility of hitting the Earth in 2028." But by 23 December 1997, it was clear that 1997 XF_{11} had no reasonable possibility of an Earth impact. Many news outlets mistakenly emphasized the possibility of disaster.

Within hours of the announcement, independent calculations by Paul Chodas, Don Yeomans, and Karri Muinonen had calculated that the probability of Earth impact was essentially zero, and vastly less than the probability of impact from as-yet-undiscovered asteroids. Chodas (1999) concurs with Marsden (1999) that based on the 1997 data alone there was about 1 chance in a hundred thousand that 1997 XF_{11} could have been on an Earth-impact trajectory—that is, until the 1990 precovery observations eliminated such possibilities. During the October 2002 close approach, the asteroid was observed by the 70-meter Goldstone radar dish, further refining the orbit.

History of close approaches of large near-Earth objects since 1908 ^{(A)}

PHA	Date	Approach distance (lunar dist.)			Abs. mag (H)	Diameter ^{(C)} (m)	Ref ^{(D)}
PHA	Date	Nomi- nal^{(B)}	Mini- mum	Maxi- mum	Abs. mag (H)	Diameter ^{(C)} (m)	Ref ^{(D)}
(33342) 1998 WT24	1908-12-16	3.542	3.537	3.547	17.9	556–1795	data
(458732) 2011 MD5	1918-09-17	0.911	0.909	0.913	17.9	556–1795	data
(7482) 1994 PC1	1933-01-17	2.927	2.927	2.928	16.8	749–1357	data
69230 Hermes	1937-10-30	1.926	1.926	1.927	17.5	668–2158	data
69230 Hermes	1942-04-26	1.651	1.651	1.651	17.5	668–2158	data
(137108) 1999 AN10	1946-08-07	2.432	2.429	2.435	17.9	556–1795	data
(33342) 1998 WT24	1956-12-16	3.523	3.523	3.523	17.9	556–1795	data
(163243) 2002 FB3	1961-04-12	4.903	4.900	4.906	16.4	1669–1695	data
(192642) 1999 RD32	1969-08-27	3.627	3.625	3.630	16.3	1161–3750	data
(143651) 2003 QO104	1981-05-18	2.761	2.760	2.761	16.0	1333–4306	data
2017 CH1	1992-06-05	4.691	3.391	6.037	17.9	556–1795	data
(170086) 2002 XR14	1995-06-24	4.259	4.259	4.260	18.0	531–1714	data
(33342) 1998 WT24	2001-12-16	4.859	4.859	4.859	17.9	556–1795	data
4179 Toutatis	2004-09-29	4.031	4.031	4.031	15.3	2440–2450	data
(671294)2014 JO25	2017-04-19	4.573	4.573	4.573	17.8	582–1879	data
(137108) 1999 AN10	2027-08-07	1.014	1.010	1.019	17.9	556–1795	data
(35396) 1997 XF11	2028-10-26	2.417	2.417	2.418	16.9	881–2845	data
(154276) 2002 SY50	2071-10-30	3.415	3.412	3.418	17.6	714–1406	data
(164121) 2003 YT1	2073-04-29	4.409	4.409	4.409	16.2	1167–2267	data
(385343) 2002 LV	2076-08-04	4.184	4.183	4.185	16.6	1011–3266	data
(52768) 1998 OR2	2079-04-16	4.611	4.611	4.612	15.8	1462–4721	data
(33342) 1998 WT24	2099-12-18	4.919	4.919	4.919	17.9	556–1795	data
(85182) 1991 AQ	2130-01-27	4.140	4.139	4.141	17.1	1100	data
314082 Dryope	2186-07-16	3.709	2.996	4.786	17.5	668–2158	data
(137126) 1999 CF9	2192-08-21	4.970	4.967	4.973	18.0	531–1714	data
(290772) 2005 VC	2198-05-05	1.951	1.791	2.134	17.6	638–2061	data
^{(A)} List includes near-Earth approaches of less than 5 lunar distances (LD) of objects with H brighter than 18.^{(B)} Nominal geocentric distance from the Earth's center to the object's center (Earth radius≈0.017 LD).^{(C)} Diameter: estimated, theoretical mean-diameter based on H and albedo range between X and Y.^{(D)} Reference: data source from the JPL SBDB, with AU converted into LD (1 AU≈390 LD)^{(E)} Color codes: unobserved at close approach observed during close approach upcoming approaches
