= (164121) 2003 YT1 =

Asteroid

(164121) 2003 YT_{1}
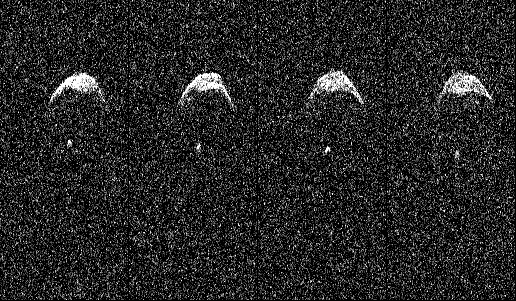
- Mosaic of radar images of 2003 YT_{1} and its moon by Arecibo Observatory on 4 May 2004

Discovery
- Discovered by: Catalina Sky Srvy.
- Discovery site: Catalina Stn.
- Discovery date: 18 December 2003

Designations
- Minor planet category: Apollo · NEO · PHA

Orbital characteristics
- Epoch 23 March 2018 (JD 2458200.5)
- Uncertainty parameter 0
- Observation arc: 35.41 yr (12,934 d)
- Aphelion: 1.4335 AU
- Perihelion: 0.7857 AU
- Semi-major axis: 1.1096 AU
- Eccentricity: 0.2919
- Orbital period (sidereal): 1.17 yr (427 d)
- Mean anomaly: 11.417°
- Mean motion: 0° 50^{m} 35.88^{s} / day
- Inclination: 44.064°
- Longitude of ascending node: 38.335°
- Argument of perihelion: 91.042°
- Known satellites: 1 (D: 210 m; P: 30 h)
- Earth MOID: 0.0027 AU (1.0519 LD)

Physical characteristics
- Mean diameter: 1.0 km 1.100±0.088 km 1.561±0.202 km 1.717±0.550 km
- Synodic rotation period: 2.34 h 2.343 h 2.343 h 3.0025±0.0001 h
- Geometric albedo: 0.198±0.153; 0.240±0.067; 0.36±0.20; 0.486±0.040; 0.4861±0.0395; 0.5848 (derived)
- Spectral type: V
- Absolute magnitude (H): 16.2; 16.20±0.3

(164121) 2003 YT_{1} is a bright asteroid and synchronous binary system on a highly eccentric orbit, classified as a near-Earth object and potentially hazardous asteroid of the Apollo group, approximately 2 kilometers (1.2 miles) in diameter. It was discovered on 18 December 2003, by astronomers with the Catalina Sky Survey at the Catalina Station near Tucson, Arizona, in the United States. The V-type asteroid has a short rotation period of 2.3 hours. Its 210-meter sized minor-planet moon was discovered at Arecibo Observatory in May 2004.

== Orbit and classification ==
2003 YT_{1} is a member of the Earth-crossing group of Apollo asteroids, the largest group of near-Earth objects with approximately 10 thousand known members.

It orbits the Sun at a distance of 0.8–1.4 AU once every 1 years and 2 months (427 days; semi-major axis of 1.11 AU). Its orbit has an eccentricity of 0.29 and an inclination of 44° with respect to the ecliptic. The body's observation arc begins with a precovery taken at the Siding Spring Observatory in November 1989, more than 14 years prior to its official discovery observation at Catalina.

=== Close approaches and Torino rating ===
The asteroid has an Earth minimum orbital intersection distance of 0.0027 AU (404,000 km; 251,000 mi), which corresponds to 1.05 lunar distances and makes it a potentially hazardous asteroid due to its sufficiently large size. On the Torino Scale, this object was rated level 1 on 27 December 2003 with an observation arc of 8.7 days. It was removed from the risk table on 29 December 2003. Over the next ten million years the asteroid has a 6% chance of impacting Earth.

On 30 April 2004 it made a close approach at a nominal distance of 0.073 AU (28 LD), and on 31 October 2016, it passed Earth at 0.035 AU (14 LD). The asteroid's closest encounter with Earth will be on 29 April 2073, when it is projected to pass at 0.0113 AU (4.4 LD) only (see table).

2003 YT_{1} has unique orbital characteristics among minor planets. It is the only known binary asteroid to have an Earth MOID within the Moon's Apogee.

Earth Approach on 3 November 2023
Date	JPL Horizons nominal geocentric distance (AU)	uncertainty region (3-sigma)
2023-Nov-03 12:33	0.05936 AU (8.880 million km)	±18 km

History of close approaches of large near-Earth objects since 1908 ^{(A)}

PHA	Date	Approach distance (lunar dist.)			Abs. mag (H)	Diameter ^{(C)} (m)	Ref ^{(D)}
PHA	Date	Nomi- nal^{(B)}	Mini- mum	Maxi- mum	Abs. mag (H)	Diameter ^{(C)} (m)	Ref ^{(D)}
(33342) 1998 WT24	1908-12-16	3.542	3.537	3.547	17.9	556–1795	data
(458732) 2011 MD5	1918-09-17	0.911	0.909	0.913	17.9	556–1795	data
(7482) 1994 PC1	1933-01-17	2.927	2.927	2.928	16.8	749–1357	data
69230 Hermes	1937-10-30	1.926	1.926	1.927	17.5	668–2158	data
69230 Hermes	1942-04-26	1.651	1.651	1.651	17.5	668–2158	data
(137108) 1999 AN10	1946-08-07	2.432	2.429	2.435	17.9	556–1795	data
(33342) 1998 WT24	1956-12-16	3.523	3.523	3.523	17.9	556–1795	data
(163243) 2002 FB3	1961-04-12	4.903	4.900	4.906	16.4	1669–1695	data
(192642) 1999 RD32	1969-08-27	3.627	3.625	3.630	16.3	1161–3750	data
(143651) 2003 QO104	1981-05-18	2.761	2.760	2.761	16.0	1333–4306	data
2017 CH1	1992-06-05	4.691	3.391	6.037	17.9	556–1795	data
(170086) 2002 XR14	1995-06-24	4.259	4.259	4.260	18.0	531–1714	data
(33342) 1998 WT24	2001-12-16	4.859	4.859	4.859	17.9	556–1795	data
4179 Toutatis	2004-09-29	4.031	4.031	4.031	15.3	2440–2450	data
(671294)2014 JO25	2017-04-19	4.573	4.573	4.573	17.8	582–1879	data
(137108) 1999 AN10	2027-08-07	1.014	1.010	1.019	17.9	556–1795	data
(35396) 1997 XF11	2028-10-26	2.417	2.417	2.418	16.9	881–2845	data
(154276) 2002 SY50	2071-10-30	3.415	3.412	3.418	17.6	714–1406	data
(164121) 2003 YT1	2073-04-29	4.409	4.409	4.409	16.2	1167–2267	data
(385343) 2002 LV	2076-08-04	4.184	4.183	4.185	16.6	1011–3266	data
(52768) 1998 OR2	2079-04-16	4.611	4.611	4.612	15.8	1462–4721	data
(33342) 1998 WT24	2099-12-18	4.919	4.919	4.919	17.9	556–1795	data
(85182) 1991 AQ	2130-01-27	4.140	4.139	4.141	17.1	1100	data
314082 Dryope	2186-07-16	3.709	2.996	4.786	17.5	668–2158	data
(137126) 1999 CF9	2192-08-21	4.970	4.967	4.973	18.0	531–1714	data
(290772) 2005 VC	2198-05-05	1.951	1.791	2.134	17.6	638–2061	data
^{(A)} List includes near-Earth approaches of less than 5 lunar distances (LD) of objects with H brighter than 18.^{(B)} Nominal geocentric distance from the Earth's center to the object's center (Earth radius≈0.017 LD).^{(C)} Diameter: estimated, theoretical mean-diameter based on H and albedo range between X and Y.^{(D)} Reference: data source from the JPL SBDB, with AU converted into LD (1 AU≈390 LD)^{(E)} Color codes: unobserved at close approach observed during close approach upcoming approaches

== Meteor stream ==
On 28 April 2017, a 2.7 cm (1 in) fragment of 2013 YT_{1} is suspected of having impacted Earth creating a fireball over Kyoto, Japan. The fragment would have broken off the parent body within the last ten thousand years.

== Physical characteristics ==
Animation of Arecibo radar images showing 2003 YT_{1}'s rotation and its satellite's orbital motion on 3 May 2004

This object has been characterized as a bright Vestian-like V-type asteroid.

=== Rotation period ===
Several rotational lightcurve of this asteroid have been obtained from photometric observations (U=2/n.a./3/3). Analysis of the best-rated lightcurve gave a short rotation period of 2.343 hours with a brightness amplitude between 0.16 and 0.27 magnitude.

=== Diameter and albedo ===
According to radar observations with the Arecibo Observatory and the survey carried out by the NEOWISE mission of NASA's Wide-field Infrared Survey Explorer, this asteroid measures between 1.0 and 1.717 kilometers in diameter and its surface has an albedo between 0.198 and 0.4861.

The Collaborative Asteroid Lightcurve Link derives an albedo of 0.5848 and adopts a diameter of 1.0 kilometer based on an absolute magnitude of 16.2.

=== Satellite ===
The Arecibo radar observations in May 2004 revealed that 2003 YT_{1} is a synchronous binary asteroid. Follow-up observations confirmed a 210-meter sized minor-planet moon orbiting its primary every 30 hours at a distance of 2.7 km.

== Numbering and naming ==
This minor planet was numbered by the Minor Planet Center on 26 September 2007 (M.P.C. 60686). As of 2018, it has not been named.
