= (137108) 1999 AN10 =

Kilometer-length near-Earth asteroid and potentially hazardous asteroid

(137108) 1999 AN_{10}
Discovery
- Discovered by: LINEAR
- Discovery date: 13 January 1999

Designations
- Minor planet category: NEO; Apollo; PHA

Orbital characteristics
- Epoch 13 September 2023 (JD 2453300.5)
- Uncertainty parameter 0
- Observation arc: 66.97 yr
- Earliest precovery date: 26 January 1955
- Aphelion: 2.28 AU (341 million km)
- Perihelion: 0.638 AU (95.4 million km)
- Semi-major axis: 1.46 AU (218 million km)
- Eccentricity: 0.56224
- Orbital period (sidereal): 1.76 yr (643.37 d)
- Mean anomaly: 313.20°
- Mean motion: 0° 33^{m} 34.236^{s} / day (n)
- Inclination: 39.929°
- Longitude of ascending node: 314.35°
- Time of perihelion: 5 December 2023
- Argument of perihelion: 268.33°
- Earth MOID: 0.00015 AU (22,000 km)

Physical characteristics
- Dimensions: 800–1800 m
- Mass: ~2.9×10^{12} kg
- Equatorial escape velocity: ~2.8 km/h
- Sidereal rotation period: 5.041 h
- Absolute magnitude (H): 18.1

(137108) 1999 AN_{10} is a kilometer-sized near-Earth asteroid and potentially hazardous asteroid of the Apollo group. It was discovered by LINEAR on 13 January 1999.

On 7 August 2027, this asteroid will pass at about 0.00261 AU (390,000 km; 243,000 mi; 1.02 LD) of the Earth's center. During the close approach, it is expected to peak at about apparent magnitude 7.3, and will be visible in binoculars.

1999 AN_{10} has a well-determined orbit with an observation arc of 65 years. It was found by Andreas Doppler and Arno Gnädig in precovery images from 1955. When astronomers had an observation arc of the object of 123 days, computations gave a 1 in 10 million chance it would return on an impact trajectory in 2039.

On 7 August 1946, the asteroid passed 0.00625 AU (935,000 km; 581,000 mi) from Earth and then 0.00404 AU (604,000 km; 376,000 mi) from the Moon.

1999 AN_{10} Position uncertainty and increasing divergence
| Date | JPL SBDB nominal geocentric distance (AU) | uncertainty region (3-sigma) |
|---|---|---|
| 1946-08-07 | 0.006250 AU (935.0 thousand km) | ±900 km |
| 2027-08-07 | 0.002606 AU (389.9 thousand km) | ±160 km |
| 2076-02-04 | 0.027021 AU (4.0423 million km) | ±154 thousand km |
| 2198-02-01 | 0.063727 AU (9.5334 million km) | ±800 thousand km |

2027 Moon/Earth approach
| Date & Time | Approach to | Nominal distance |
|---|---|---|
| 2027-Aug-07 06:48 | Moon | 763391 km |
| 2027-Aug-07 07:11 | Earth | 389866 km |

Animation of 1999 AN_{10}'s orbit – Close approach in 2027 Sun · Earth · 1999 AN_{10}

== See also ==
History of close approaches of large near-Earth objects since 1908 ^{(A)}

| PHA | Date | Approach distance (lunar dist.) | | | Abs. mag (H) | Diameter ^{(C)} (m) | Ref ^{(D)} |
| PHA | Date | Nomi- nal^{(B)} | Mini- mum | Maxi- mum | Abs. mag (H) | Diameter ^{(C)} (m) | Ref ^{(D)} |
|---|---|---|---|---|---|---|---|
| (33342) 1998 WT24 | 1908-12-16 | 3.542 | 3.537 | 3.547 | 17.9 | 556–1795 | data |
| (458732) 2011 MD5 | 1918-09-17 | 0.911 | 0.909 | 0.913 | 17.9 | 556–1795 | data |
| (7482) 1994 PC1 | 1933-01-17 | 2.927 | 2.927 | 2.928 | 16.8 | 749–1357 | data |
| 69230 Hermes | 1937-10-30 | 1.926 | 1.926 | 1.927 | 17.5 | 668–2158 | data |
| 69230 Hermes | 1942-04-26 | 1.651 | 1.651 | 1.651 | 17.5 | 668–2158 | data |
| (137108) 1999 AN10 | 1946-08-07 | 2.432 | 2.429 | 2.435 | 17.9 | 556–1795 | data |
| (33342) 1998 WT24 | 1956-12-16 | 3.523 | 3.523 | 3.523 | 17.9 | 556–1795 | data |
| (163243) 2002 FB3 | 1961-04-12 | 4.903 | 4.900 | 4.906 | 16.4 | 1669–1695 | data |
| (192642) 1999 RD32 | 1969-08-27 | 3.627 | 3.625 | 3.630 | 16.3 | 1161–3750 | data |
| (143651) 2003 QO104 | 1981-05-18 | 2.761 | 2.760 | 2.761 | 16.0 | 1333–4306 | data |
| 2017 CH1 | 1992-06-05 | 4.691 | 3.391 | 6.037 | 17.9 | 556–1795 | data |
| (170086) 2002 XR14 | 1995-06-24 | 4.259 | 4.259 | 4.260 | 18.0 | 531–1714 | data |
| (33342) 1998 WT24 | 2001-12-16 | 4.859 | 4.859 | 4.859 | 17.9 | 556–1795 | data |
| 4179 Toutatis | 2004-09-29 | 4.031 | 4.031 | 4.031 | 15.3 | 2440–2450 | data |
| (671294)2014 JO25 | 2017-04-19 | 4.573 | 4.573 | 4.573 | 17.8 | 582–1879 | data |
| (137108) 1999 AN10 | 2027-08-07 | 1.014 | 1.010 | 1.019 | 17.9 | 556–1795 | data |
| (35396) 1997 XF11 | 2028-10-26 | 2.417 | 2.417 | 2.418 | 16.9 | 881–2845 | data |
| (154276) 2002 SY50 | 2071-10-30 | 3.415 | 3.412 | 3.418 | 17.6 | 714–1406 | data |
| (164121) 2003 YT1 | 2073-04-29 | 4.409 | 4.409 | 4.409 | 16.2 | 1167–2267 | data |
| (385343) 2002 LV | 2076-08-04 | 4.184 | 4.183 | 4.185 | 16.6 | 1011–3266 | data |
| (52768) 1998 OR2 | 2079-04-16 | 4.611 | 4.611 | 4.612 | 15.8 | 1462–4721 | data |
| (33342) 1998 WT24 | 2099-12-18 | 4.919 | 4.919 | 4.919 | 17.9 | 556–1795 | data |
| (85182) 1991 AQ | 2130-01-27 | 4.140 | 4.139 | 4.141 | 17.1 | 1100 | data |
| 314082 Dryope | 2186-07-16 | 3.709 | 2.996 | 4.786 | 17.5 | 668–2158 | data |
| (137126) 1999 CF9 | 2192-08-21 | 4.970 | 4.967 | 4.973 | 18.0 | 531–1714 | data |
| (290772) 2005 VC | 2198-05-05 | 1.951 | 1.791 | 2.134 | 17.6 | 638–2061 | data |
^{(A)} List includes near-Earth approaches of less than 5 lunar distances (LD) of objects with H brighter than 18.^{(B)} Nominal geocentric distance from the Earth's center to the object's center (Earth radius≈0.017 LD).^{(C)} Diameter: estimated, theoretical mean-diameter based on H and albedo range between X and Y.^{(D)} Reference: data source from the JPL SBDB, with AU converted into LD (1 AU≈390 LD)^{(E)} Color codes: unobserved at close approach observed during close approach upcoming approaches

- Asteroid impact prediction
- Earth-grazing fireball
- List of asteroid close approaches to Earth
