= (192642) 1999 RD32 =

Asteroid and suspected contact binary

(192642) 1999 RD_{32}
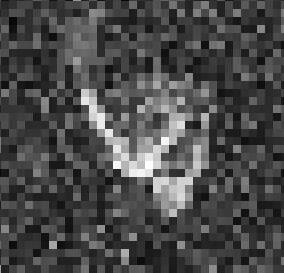
- Goldstone radar image showing the two lobes of suspected contact binary 1999 RD_{32}.

Discovery
- Discovered by: LINEAR
- Discovery site: Lincoln Lab's ETS
- Discovery date: 8 September 1999

Designations
- Minor planet category: Apollo · NEO · PHA

Orbital characteristics
- Epoch 4 September 2017 (JD 2458000.5)
- Uncertainty parameter 0
- Observation arc: 21.92 yr (8,007 days)
- Aphelion: 4.6801 AU
- Perihelion: 0.6093 AU
- Semi-major axis: 2.6447 AU
- Eccentricity: 0.7696
- Orbital period (sidereal): 4.30 yr (1,571 days)
- Mean anomaly: 89.009°
- Mean motion: 0° 13^{m} 45.12^{s} / day
- Inclination: 6.7914°
- Longitude of ascending node: 310.04°
- Argument of perihelion: 299.89°
- Earth MOID: 0.0495 AU · 19.3 LD
- Jupiter MOID: 0.6702 AU

Physical characteristics
- Mean diameter: 1.63 km (calculated–dated); 5 km (est.–radiometric)
- Synodic rotation period: 17.08±0.03 h (Note: Lightcurve plot of (192642) 1999 RD32, Palmer Divide Observatory, B. D. Warner (2012): rotation period 17.08±0.03 hours with a brightness amplitude of 0.28±0.02 mag. Summary figures at the LCDB); 17.1±0.5 h
- Geometric albedo: 0.04 (est.–radiometric); 0.20 (assumed–dated)
- Spectral type: C
- Absolute magnitude (H): 16.00 · 16.23±0.01 · 16.3

(192642) 1999 RD_{32} is an asteroid and suspected contact binary on an eccentric orbit, classified as a large near-Earth object and potentially hazardous asteroid of the Apollo group, approximately 5 kilometers (3 miles) in diameter. It was discovered on 8 September 1999, at a magnitude of 18, by astronomers of the LINEAR program using its 1-meter telescope at the Lincoln Laboratory's Experimental Test Site near Socorro, New Mexico, United States. The asteroid is likely of carbonaceous composition and has a rotation period of 17.08 hours.

== Description ==
1999 RD_{32} orbits the Sun at a distance of 0.6–4.7 AU once every 4 years and 4 months (1,571 days; semi-major axis of 2.64 AU). Its orbit has a high eccentricity of 0.77 and an inclination of 7° with respect to the ecliptic.

The asteroid's observation arc begins with a precovery taken at Palomar Observatory in January 1995. It is known that 1999 RD_{32} passed 0.0093 AU (1,390,000 km; 860,000 mi) from Earth on 27 August 1969. During the 1969 close approach the asteroid reached about apparent magnitude 8.8. The similarly sized 4179 Toutatis also reached that brightness in September 2004. It passed less than 0.007 AU (1,000,000 km; 650,000 mi) from asteroid 29 Amphitrite on 17 January 1939.

Arecibo radar observations on 5–6 March 2012 showed that 1999 RD_{32} is approximately 5 kilometers (3 mi) in diameter and has an estimated albedo of only 0.04. Other sources calculate a smaller diameter of 1.63 kilometers based on a dated assumption, that the object is a stony rather than a carbonaceous asteroid. The two visible lobes suggest that 1999 RD_{32} is a tight binary asteroid or contact binary. About 10–15% of near-Earth asteroids larger than 200 meters are expected to be contact binary asteroids with two lobes in mutual contact.

Close-approaches to Earth
Date	Distance from Earth
1969-08-27	0.0093 AU (1,390,000 km; 860,000 mi)
2012-03-14	0.1487 AU (22,250,000 km; 13,820,000 mi)
2042-03-11	0.1428 AU (21,360,000 km; 13,270,000 mi)
2046-09-04	0.1071 AU (16,020,000 km; 9,960,000 mi)

History of close approaches of large near-Earth objects since 1908 ^{(A)}

PHA	Date	Approach distance (lunar dist.)			Abs. mag (H)	Diameter ^{(C)} (m)	Ref ^{(D)}
PHA	Date	Nomi- nal^{(B)}	Mini- mum	Maxi- mum	Abs. mag (H)	Diameter ^{(C)} (m)	Ref ^{(D)}
(33342) 1998 WT24	1908-12-16	3.542	3.537	3.547	17.9	556–1795	data
(458732) 2011 MD5	1918-09-17	0.911	0.909	0.913	17.9	556–1795	data
(7482) 1994 PC1	1933-01-17	2.927	2.927	2.928	16.8	749–1357	data
69230 Hermes	1937-10-30	1.926	1.926	1.927	17.5	668–2158	data
69230 Hermes	1942-04-26	1.651	1.651	1.651	17.5	668–2158	data
(137108) 1999 AN10	1946-08-07	2.432	2.429	2.435	17.9	556–1795	data
(33342) 1998 WT24	1956-12-16	3.523	3.523	3.523	17.9	556–1795	data
(163243) 2002 FB3	1961-04-12	4.903	4.900	4.906	16.4	1669–1695	data
(192642) 1999 RD32	1969-08-27	3.627	3.625	3.630	16.3	1161–3750	data
(143651) 2003 QO104	1981-05-18	2.761	2.760	2.761	16.0	1333–4306	data
2017 CH1	1992-06-05	4.691	3.391	6.037	17.9	556–1795	data
(170086) 2002 XR14	1995-06-24	4.259	4.259	4.260	18.0	531–1714	data
(33342) 1998 WT24	2001-12-16	4.859	4.859	4.859	17.9	556–1795	data
4179 Toutatis	2004-09-29	4.031	4.031	4.031	15.3	2440–2450	data
(671294)2014 JO25	2017-04-19	4.573	4.573	4.573	17.8	582–1879	data
(137108) 1999 AN10	2027-08-07	1.014	1.010	1.019	17.9	556–1795	data
(35396) 1997 XF11	2028-10-26	2.417	2.417	2.418	16.9	881–2845	data
(154276) 2002 SY50	2071-10-30	3.415	3.412	3.418	17.6	714–1406	data
(164121) 2003 YT1	2073-04-29	4.409	4.409	4.409	16.2	1167–2267	data
(385343) 2002 LV	2076-08-04	4.184	4.183	4.185	16.6	1011–3266	data
(52768) 1998 OR2	2079-04-16	4.611	4.611	4.612	15.8	1462–4721	data
(33342) 1998 WT24	2099-12-18	4.919	4.919	4.919	17.9	556–1795	data
(85182) 1991 AQ	2130-01-27	4.140	4.139	4.141	17.1	1100	data
314082 Dryope	2186-07-16	3.709	2.996	4.786	17.5	668–2158	data
(137126) 1999 CF9	2192-08-21	4.970	4.967	4.973	18.0	531–1714	data
(290772) 2005 VC	2198-05-05	1.951	1.791	2.134	17.6	638–2061	data
^{(A)} List includes near-Earth approaches of less than 5 lunar distances (LD) of objects with H brighter than 18.^{(B)} Nominal geocentric distance from the Earth's center to the object's center (Earth radius≈0.017 LD).^{(C)} Diameter: estimated, theoretical mean-diameter based on H and albedo range between X and Y.^{(D)} Reference: data source from the JPL SBDB, with AU converted into LD (1 AU≈390 LD)^{(E)} Color codes: unobserved at close approach observed during close approach upcoming approaches

== Numbering and naming ==
This minor planet was numbered by the Minor Planet Center on 13 November 2008. As of 2018, it has not been named.
