= (52768) 1998 OR2 =

Asteroid

(52768) 1998 OR_{2}
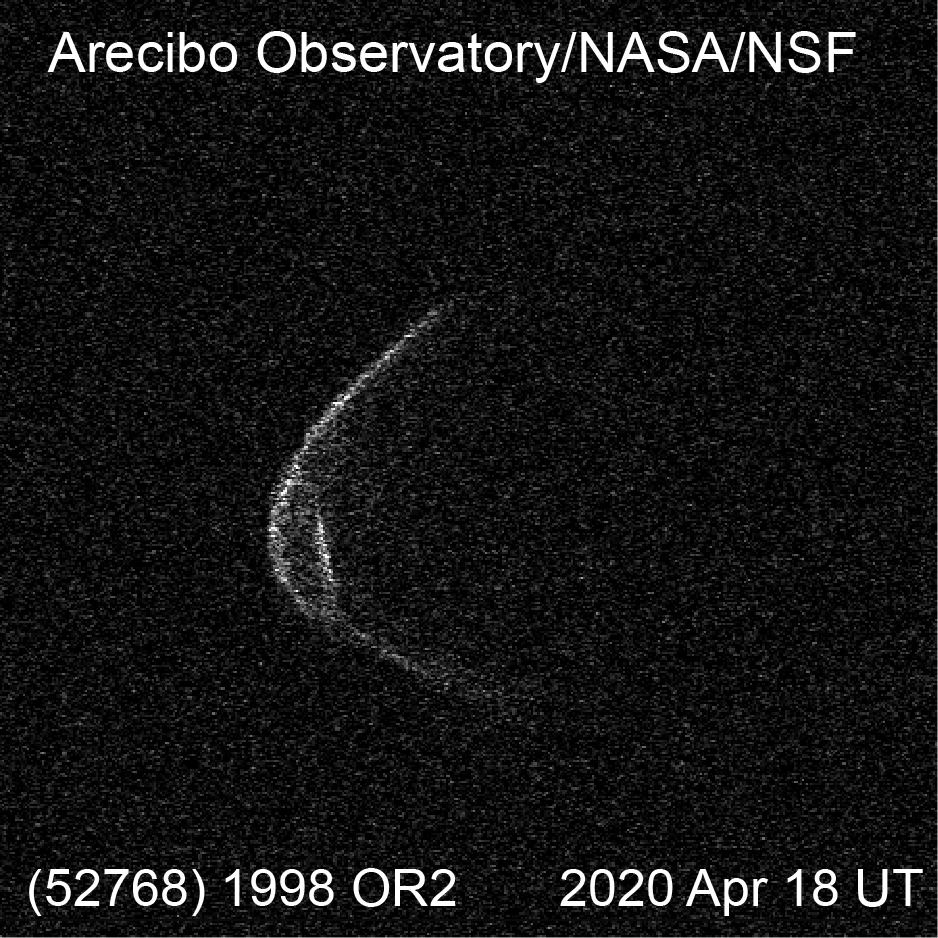
- Arecibo Observatory radar image of 1998 OR_{2} with a crater on 18 April 2020

Discovery
- Discovered by: NEAT
- Discovery site: Haleakala Obs.
- Discovery date: 24 July 1998

Designations
- Minor planet category: Amor · NEO · PHA

Orbital characteristics
- Epoch 25 February 2023 (JD 2460000.5 )
- Uncertainty parameter 0
- Observation arc: 35.49 yr (12,963 days)
- Earliest precovery date: 30 June 1987 (Siding Spring Obs.)
- Aphelion: 3.750 AU
- Perihelion: 1.011 AU
- Semi-major axis: 2.380 AU
- Eccentricity: 0.5754
- Orbital period (sidereal): 3.67 yr (1,342 days)
- Mean anomaly: 280.159°
- Mean motion: 0° 16^{m} 6.082^{s} / day
- Inclination: 5.878°
- Longitude of ascending node: 26.942°
- Argument of perihelion: 174.580°
- Earth MOID: 0.00866 AU (3.37 LD)

Physical characteristics
- Dimensions: 2.08 × 1.93 × 1.60 km (± 0.10 × 0.10 × 0.03 km)
- Mean diameter: 1.78±0.10 km
- Surface area: 10.67 km^{2}
- Volume: 3.0±0.5 km^{3}
- Mean density: 3.2±0.2 g/cm^{3}
- Synodic rotation period: 4.10872±0.00001 h
- Axial tilt: 69.3°±5° (wrt ecliptic) (Note: 1998 OR_{2}'s rotational north pole direction is given in terms of ecliptic coordinates, where λ is ecliptic longitude and β is ecliptic latitude. β is the angular offset from the ecliptic plane, whereas inclination i with respect to the ecliptic is the angular offset of the asteroid's rotational north pole from the ecliptic north pole at β = +90° ; i with respect to the ecliptic would be the complement of β. Therefore, given β = +20.7°, i = 90° – (+20.7°) = 69.3° from the ecliptic.)
- Pole ecliptic longitude: 332.3°±5°
- Pole ecliptic latitude: 20.7°±5°
- Geometric albedo: 0.15
- Spectral type: Xn or S
- Absolute magnitude (H): 15.72±0.02; 16.04

(52768) 1998 OR_{2} is an asteroid on an eccentric orbit, classified as a near-Earth object and potentially hazardous asteroid of the Amor group, with a diameter of 2 kilometers (1.2 mi). It was discovered on 24 July 1998, by astronomers of the Near-Earth Asteroid Tracking (NEAT) program at the Haleakala Observatory, Hawaii. It passed very near to Earth on 29 April 2020 at around 4:15am. It is one of the brightest and therefore largest potentially hazardous asteroids known to exist. With an observation arc of 37.27 years (13612 days), the asteroid has a well-determined orbit, and its trajectory is well known through the year 2197. The asteroid's orbit is only potentially hazardous on a time scale of thousands of years.

== Orbit and classification ==
Time lapse of asteroid 1998 OR_{2}'s motion in the sky on 9 April 2020

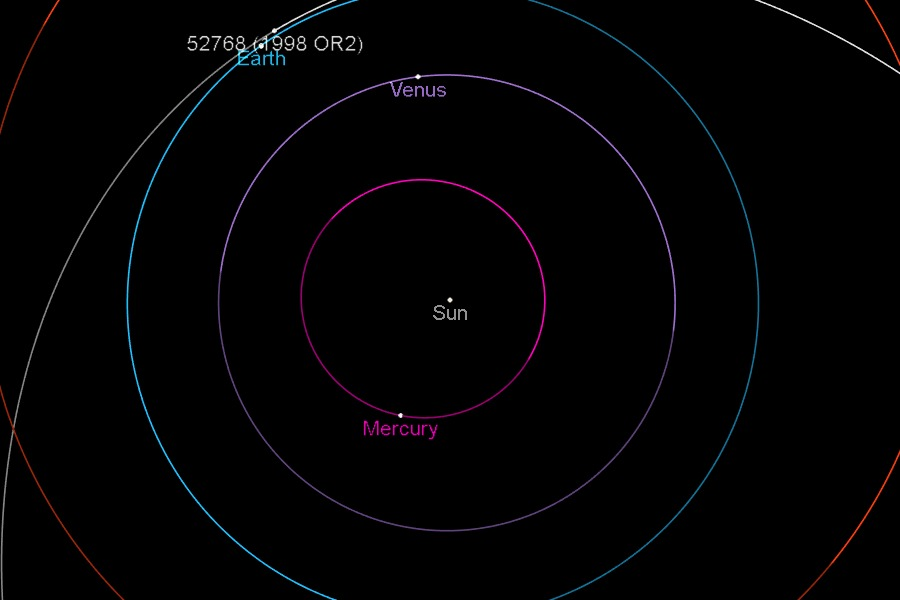
Orbit diagram of 1998 OR_{2}

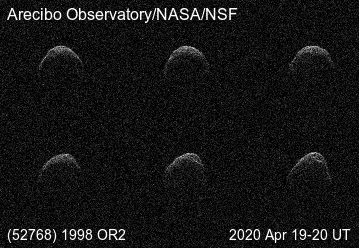
Arecibo radar images of 1998 OR_{2} taken over a two-hour period in April 2020

Animation of 1998 OR2 close approach in 2020

1998 OR_{2} is a member of the dynamical Amor group of near-Earth asteroids, and therefore does not currently cross Earth's orbit. The asteroid's closest approach to the Sun is just outside Earth's farthest distance from the Sun. When the asteroid has a perihelion point less than 1.017 AU (Earth's aphelion), it is classified an Apollo asteroid. This asteroid's category flips back and forth as time passes, due to minor perturbations of its orbit.

It orbits the Sun at a distance of 1.0–3.7 AU once every 3 years and 8 months (1,344 days; semi-major axis of 2.38 AU). Its orbit has a high eccentricity of 0.57 and an inclination of 6° with respect to the ecliptic. With its sufficiently large aphelion, this asteroid is also classified as a Mars-crosser, crossing the orbit of Mars at 1.66 AU.

The body's observation arc begins with a precovery published by the Digitized Sky Survey taken at the Siding Spring Observatory in June 1986, more than 12 years prior to its official discovery observation at Haleakala Observatory, Hawaii.

=== Close approaches ===
With an absolute magnitude of approximately 15.8, 1998 OR_{2} is one of the brightest and presumably largest-known potentially hazardous asteroids (see PHA-list). It currently has an Earth minimum orbital intersection distance of 0.0087 AU (1,300,000 km), which translates into 3.4 lunar distances (LD). On 16 April 2079, this asteroid will make a near-Earth encounter at a safe distance of 0.0118 AU (4.59 LD), and pass the Moon at 0.0092 AU (3.6 LD). The asteroid's orbit is only potentially hazardous on a time scale of hundreds, if not thousands, of years.

On 29 April 2020 at 09:56 UTC, the asteroid passed at a distance of 0.042 AU (6.3 million km; 16 LD) from Earth. With observations as recent as April 2020 and a 32-year observation arc, the 2020 close approach distance was known with an accuracy of roughly ±6 km. (For comparison, Venus will be 0.29 AU or 43 million km or 110 LD from Earth on 3 June 2020.)

History of close approaches of large near-Earth objects since 1908 ^{(A)}

PHA	Date	Approach distance (lunar dist.)			Abs. mag (H)	Diameter ^{(C)} (m)	Ref ^{(D)}
PHA	Date	Nomi- nal^{(B)}	Mini- mum	Maxi- mum	Abs. mag (H)	Diameter ^{(C)} (m)	Ref ^{(D)}
(33342) 1998 WT24	1908-12-16	3.542	3.537	3.547	17.9	556–1795	data
(458732) 2011 MD5	1918-09-17	0.911	0.909	0.913	17.9	556–1795	data
(7482) 1994 PC1	1933-01-17	2.927	2.927	2.928	16.8	749–1357	data
69230 Hermes	1937-10-30	1.926	1.926	1.927	17.5	668–2158	data
69230 Hermes	1942-04-26	1.651	1.651	1.651	17.5	668–2158	data
(137108) 1999 AN10	1946-08-07	2.432	2.429	2.435	17.9	556–1795	data
(33342) 1998 WT24	1956-12-16	3.523	3.523	3.523	17.9	556–1795	data
(163243) 2002 FB3	1961-04-12	4.903	4.900	4.906	16.4	1669–1695	data
(192642) 1999 RD32	1969-08-27	3.627	3.625	3.630	16.3	1161–3750	data
(143651) 2003 QO104	1981-05-18	2.761	2.760	2.761	16.0	1333–4306	data
2017 CH1	1992-06-05	4.691	3.391	6.037	17.9	556–1795	data
(170086) 2002 XR14	1995-06-24	4.259	4.259	4.260	18.0	531–1714	data
(33342) 1998 WT24	2001-12-16	4.859	4.859	4.859	17.9	556–1795	data
4179 Toutatis	2004-09-29	4.031	4.031	4.031	15.3	2440–2450	data
(671294)2014 JO25	2017-04-19	4.573	4.573	4.573	17.8	582–1879	data
(137108) 1999 AN10	2027-08-07	1.014	1.010	1.019	17.9	556–1795	data
(35396) 1997 XF11	2028-10-26	2.417	2.417	2.418	16.9	881–2845	data
(154276) 2002 SY50	2071-10-30	3.415	3.412	3.418	17.6	714–1406	data
(164121) 2003 YT1	2073-04-29	4.409	4.409	4.409	16.2	1167–2267	data
(385343) 2002 LV	2076-08-04	4.184	4.183	4.185	16.6	1011–3266	data
(52768) 1998 OR2	2079-04-16	4.611	4.611	4.612	15.8	1462–4721	data
(33342) 1998 WT24	2099-12-18	4.919	4.919	4.919	17.9	556–1795	data
(85182) 1991 AQ	2130-01-27	4.140	4.139	4.141	17.1	1100	data
314082 Dryope	2186-07-16	3.709	2.996	4.786	17.5	668–2158	data
(137126) 1999 CF9	2192-08-21	4.970	4.967	4.973	18.0	531–1714	data
(290772) 2005 VC	2198-05-05	1.951	1.791	2.134	17.6	638–2061	data
^{(A)} List includes near-Earth approaches of less than 5 lunar distances (LD) of objects with H brighter than 18.^{(B)} Nominal geocentric distance from the Earth's center to the object's center (Earth radius≈0.017 LD).^{(C)} Diameter: estimated, theoretical mean-diameter based on H and albedo range between X and Y.^{(D)} Reference: data source from the JPL SBDB, with AU converted into LD (1 AU≈390 LD)^{(E)} Color codes: unobserved at close approach observed during close approach upcoming approaches

== Physical characteristics ==
Animation of radar images showing 1998 OR_{2}'s rotation

According to observations by the NASA IRTF telescope during the ExploreNEOs Warm Spitzer program, 1998 OR_{2} is a rather rare L-type asteroid. Delay-Doppler radar observations by the Arecibo Observatory in April 2020 have shown that 1998 OR_{2} bears a large, crater-like concavity in its shape. These radar observations have also resolved several other topographic features on the asteroid's surface, such as hills and ridges.

=== Rotation period ===
In 2009, rotational lightcurves of 1998 OR_{2} were obtained from photometric observations by astronomers in Salvador, Brazil, and during the Lowell Observatory Near-Earth Asteroid Photometric Survey (NEAPS). Lightcurve analysis gave a rotation period of 3.198 and 4.112 hours with a brightness amplitude of 0.29 and 0.16 magnitude, respectively (U=2/2+). The latter rotation period of 4.1 hours was later confirmed by radar observations of the asteroid in 2020.

=== Diameter and albedo ===
The Collaborative Asteroid Lightcurve Link (CALL) assumes a standard albedo for stony asteroids of 0.20 and calculates a diameter of 2.15 km (1.34 mi) based on an absolute magnitude of 15.7. It is the first near-Earth asteroid to show evidence of shock darkening: the slow darkening of the surface over time, from micrometeorites and solar wind.

== Naming ==
As of 2023, this minor planet has not been named.
