= (33342) 1998 WT24 =

Sub-kilometer asteroid

(33342) 1998 WT_{24}
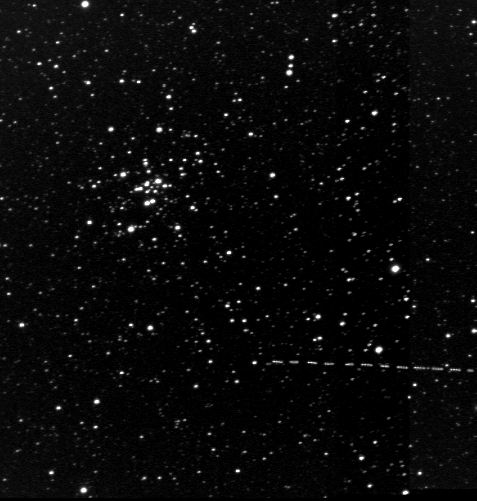
- Tracks of asteroid 1998 WT_{24}

Discovery
- Discovered by: LINEAR
- Discovery site: Lincoln Lab's ETS
- Discovery date: 25 November 1998

Designations
- Minor planet category: Aten; NEO; PHA

Orbital characteristics
- Epoch 28 June 2009 (JD 2455010.5)
- Uncertainty parameter 0
- Observation arc: 18.98 yr (6,933 days)
- Aphelion: 1.0187 AU
- Perihelion: 0.4182 AU
- Semi-major axis: 0.7185 AU
- Eccentricity: 0.4179
- Orbital period (sidereal): 0.61 yr (222 days)
- Mean anomaly: 344.05°
- Mean motion: 1° 37^{m} 6.24^{s} / day
- Inclination: 7.3419°
- Longitude of ascending node: 82.000°
- Argument of perihelion: 167.30°
- Earth MOID: 0.0097 AU (3.8 LD)

Physical characteristics
- Mean diameter: 0.35±0.04 km; 0.410 km (taken); 0.415±0.040 km
- Synodic rotation period: 3.6970±0.0002 h; 3.697±0.0006 h (Note: Several lightcurve plots of (33342) obtained at the Center for Solar System Studies by B. D. Warner (2015).); 3.697 h; 3.6977±0.0023 h (Note: Pravec (2001) web. Observations from December 2001. Rotation period 3.6977±0.0023 hours with a brightness amplitude of 0.28 mag. Quality Code of 3. Summary figures for (33342) at the LCDB and Pravec, P.; Wolf, M.; Sarounova, L. (2001), see Ondrejov data obtained by the NEO Photometric Program and collaborating projects); 3.698 h (Note: Robinson (2011) web: rotation period 3.698 hours with a brightness amplitude of 0.26 mag. Quality Code of 3. Summary figures for (33342) at the LCDB); 3.7±0.1 h
- Geometric albedo: 0.34±0.2; 0.56±0.2; 0.75±0.35
- Spectral type: E; S
- Absolute magnitude (H): 17.9; 18.5±0.3; 18.69; 18.69±0.3

(33342) 1998 WT_{24} is a bright, sub-kilometer asteroid, classified as a near-Earth object and potentially hazardous asteroid (PHA) of the Aten group, located in Venus's zone of influence that has frequent close encounters with Mercury, Venus, and Earth. It made a close approach to Earth on 11 December 2015, passing at a distance of about 4.2 million kilometers (2.6 million miles, 11 lunar distances) and reaching about apparent magnitude 11.

The asteroid was discovered on 25 November 1998 by LINEAR about four months after a close encounter with the planet Mercury (about 0.047 AU). It measures approximately 400 meters in diameter. It is also one of the best studied PHAs and was the 10th Aten asteroid to be numbered.

== Classification and orbit ==
Radar observation during 2001 encounter

1998 WT_{24} orbits the Sun at a distance of 0.42–1.02 AU once every 7 months (222 days; semi-major axis of 0.72 AU). Its orbit has an eccentricity of 0.42 and an inclination of 7° with respect to the ecliptic.

=== Low aphelion ===
At the time of its discovery, astronomers were trying to find the first Apohele asteroid (one that is always closer to the Sun than Earth). All asteroids known at the time that got closer to the Sun than Earth also crossed Earth's orbit. Earlier that year, David J. Tholen claimed to have spotted the first Apohele asteroid, which was dubbed 1998 DK36. However, the object was lost without being confirmed. Thus, 1993 DA remained the asteroid with the lowest known aphelion at 1.023 AU. When 1998 WT_{24} was discovered, it was found to have a slightly smaller aphelion (1.019 AU) than 1993 DA, and was thus the closest thing to an Apohele asteroid known at the time. It lost its smallest aphelion title almost immediately when (415713) 1998 XX2 was discovered only a few weeks later (aphelion = 1.014 AU). Asteroids with even smaller aphelions were discovered until February 2003, when finally, an asteroid with an aphelion smaller than 1.000 AU was discovered. This was 163693 Atira, the first confirmed Apohele asteroid.

=== Venus zone of influence ===
1998 WT_{24} was the second asteroid discovered to be close enough to Venus as to be within the major planet's zone of influence. It is located at about the inner edge of the zone, while (99907) 1989 VA, the first asteroid discovered there, is at about the outer edge. It is possible for planets to capture asteroids located in their sphere of influences into co-orbital relationships such as trojan and horseshoe asteroids. Because of its frequent close encounters with Mercury and Earth, however, it may prove difficult for Venus to keep 1998 WT_{24} in a co-orbital relationship for any length of time. Of the six objects in Venus's zone of influence, only Zoozve is currently a co-orbital.

=== Record close encounter ===
1998 WT_{24} is a potentially hazardous asteroid. That means its orbit takes it very close to Earth and if it were to collide with our planet, it would cause devastation on at least a regional scale. On 16 December 2001, it became the first PHA to be observed passing within 5 Lunar Distances (the average distance between Earth and the Moon) from Earth. Other asteroids have come closer, and numerous have even come closer than the Moon, but these have all been small asteroids, incapable of causing much damage to the planet, or much concern. The 2001 encounter was the closest known approach to Earth any PHA had made since (192642) 1999 RD32 passed by on 27 August 1969. However, 1999 RD_{32} was not discovered until September 1999 many years after its closest approach, so no one knew about 1999 RD_{32} in 1969.

Notable close-approaches to Earth
Date	Distance from Earth
1908-12-16	0.00907 AU (1,357,000 km; 843,000 mi)
1956-12-16	0.009054 AU (1,354,500 km; 841,600 mi)
2001-12-16	0.012485 AU (1,867,700 km; 1,160,600 mi)
2099-12-18	0.012640 AU (1,890,900 km; 1,175,000 mi)

In September 2004, the well known PHA 4179 Toutatis came about 4 Lunar Distances from Earth. Due to its diameter being over ten times larger (5.7 km) and its closer approach, Toutatis at its closest (mag 8.9) was about half an apparent magnitude brighter than 1998 WT_{24} was at its closest (mag 9.5). However, Toutatis arrived during a full moon, and thus 1998 WT_{24}'s 2001 encounter is still the most easily observed flyby of an asteroid in history. It also made 1998 WT_{24} the first near-Earth asteroid observed to be brighter than magnitude 10.

History of close approaches of large near-Earth objects since 1908 ^{(A)}

PHA	Date	Approach distance (lunar dist.)			Abs. mag (H)	Diameter ^{(C)} (m)	Ref ^{(D)}
PHA	Date	Nomi- nal^{(B)}	Mini- mum	Maxi- mum	Abs. mag (H)	Diameter ^{(C)} (m)	Ref ^{(D)}
(33342) 1998 WT24	1908-12-16	3.542	3.537	3.547	17.9	556–1795	data
(458732) 2011 MD5	1918-09-17	0.911	0.909	0.913	17.9	556–1795	data
(7482) 1994 PC1	1933-01-17	2.927	2.927	2.928	16.8	749–1357	data
69230 Hermes	1937-10-30	1.926	1.926	1.927	17.5	668–2158	data
69230 Hermes	1942-04-26	1.651	1.651	1.651	17.5	668–2158	data
(137108) 1999 AN10	1946-08-07	2.432	2.429	2.435	17.9	556–1795	data
(33342) 1998 WT24	1956-12-16	3.523	3.523	3.523	17.9	556–1795	data
(163243) 2002 FB3	1961-04-12	4.903	4.900	4.906	16.4	1669–1695	data
(192642) 1999 RD32	1969-08-27	3.627	3.625	3.630	16.3	1161–3750	data
(143651) 2003 QO104	1981-05-18	2.761	2.760	2.761	16.0	1333–4306	data
2017 CH1	1992-06-05	4.691	3.391	6.037	17.9	556–1795	data
(170086) 2002 XR14	1995-06-24	4.259	4.259	4.260	18.0	531–1714	data
(33342) 1998 WT24	2001-12-16	4.859	4.859	4.859	17.9	556–1795	data
4179 Toutatis	2004-09-29	4.031	4.031	4.031	15.3	2440–2450	data
(671294)2014 JO25	2017-04-19	4.573	4.573	4.573	17.8	582–1879	data
(137108) 1999 AN10	2027-08-07	1.014	1.010	1.019	17.9	556–1795	data
(35396) 1997 XF11	2028-10-26	2.417	2.417	2.418	16.9	881–2845	data
(154276) 2002 SY50	2071-10-30	3.415	3.412	3.418	17.6	714–1406	data
(164121) 2003 YT1	2073-04-29	4.409	4.409	4.409	16.2	1167–2267	data
(385343) 2002 LV	2076-08-04	4.184	4.183	4.185	16.6	1011–3266	data
(52768) 1998 OR2	2079-04-16	4.611	4.611	4.612	15.8	1462–4721	data
(33342) 1998 WT24	2099-12-18	4.919	4.919	4.919	17.9	556–1795	data
(85182) 1991 AQ	2130-01-27	4.140	4.139	4.141	17.1	1100	data
314082 Dryope	2186-07-16	3.709	2.996	4.786	17.5	668–2158	data
(137126) 1999 CF9	2192-08-21	4.970	4.967	4.973	18.0	531–1714	data
(290772) 2005 VC	2198-05-05	1.951	1.791	2.134	17.6	638–2061	data
^{(A)} List includes near-Earth approaches of less than 5 lunar distances (LD) of objects with H brighter than 18.^{(B)} Nominal geocentric distance from the Earth's center to the object's center (Earth radius≈0.017 LD).^{(C)} Diameter: estimated, theoretical mean-diameter based on H and albedo range between X and Y.^{(D)} Reference: data source from the JPL SBDB, with AU converted into LD (1 AU≈390 LD)^{(E)} Color codes: unobserved at close approach observed during close approach upcoming approaches

=== Frequent inner-planet encounters ===
1998 WT_{24} is a Mercury-crosser asteroid, a Venus-crosser asteroid, and an Earth-crosser asteroid. Because of its relatively low inclination (7.34°), it is able to come close to each of these planets. Its orbit takes it within 0.021 AU of Mercury's orbit, 0.0368 AU of Venus's orbit, and 0.00989 AU of Earth's orbit. It makes frequent encounters with these inner planets. The last time it came close to Mercury, Venus and Earth was 2010, 1977, and 12 November 2004, respectively. The most recent close approach to Earth was on 11 December 2015 at about 4.2 million kilometers (2.6 million miles, 11 lunar distances). The next visit of the asteroid to Earth's neighborhood was on 11 November 2018, when it made a relatively distant pass at about 20 million kilometers (12.5 million miles, 52 lunar distances). These encounters perturb its orbit parameters slightly, and each pass reduces its inclination further.

== Physical characteristics ==
During its close encounters in 2001 and 2015, astronomers were able to make radar images of its surface and determine physical properties that remain unknown for most asteroids. According to the ExploreNEOs Warm Spitzer Exploration Science program, 1998 WT_{24} is a bright E-type asteroid with an exceptionally high albedo of 0.75±0.35.

=== Diameter and albedo ===
1998 WT_{24} measures between 350 and 415 meters in diameter and its surface has an albedo between 0.34 and 0.75. The Collaborative Asteroid Lightcurve Link an albedo of 0.34 and takes a diameter of 410 meters based on an absolute magnitude of 18.69. The asteroid is modestly elongated, approximately 420 × 330 meters.

=== Rotation period ===
Several rotational lightcurves of 1998 WT_{24} have been obtained from radiometric and photometric observations. Lightcurve analysis gave a consolidated rotation period of 3.697 hours with a brightness amplitude between 0.19 and 0.65 magnitude (U=3).

== Future flyby candidate ==
1998 WT_{24} has an orbit that not only crosses Earth's orbit, but is roughly parallel to it at its furthest. This means that during favourable years it is easy to reach from Earth. Several times this decade, it will be an easier target than Earth's own Moon. It is high on the list of possible near-Earth asteroid targets for future flybys, landings, mining, or orbit manipulations.

== Numbering and naming ==
This minor planet was numbered by the Minor Planet Center on 18 August 2002. As of 2018, it has not been named.

== See also ==
- List of asteroid close approaches to Earth in 2015
