= (154276) 2002 SY50 =

Asteroid

(154276) 2002 SY_{50}
Discovery
- Discovered by: LINEAR
- Discovery site: Lincoln Lab's ETS
- Discovery date: 30 September 2002

Designations
- Minor planet category: Apollo · NEO · PHA

Orbital characteristics
- Epoch 23 March 2018 (JD 2458200.5)
- Uncertainty parameter 0
- Observation arc: 11.78 yr (4,304 d)
- Aphelion: 2.8793 AU
- Perihelion: 0.5297 AU
- Semi-major axis: 1.7045 AU
- Eccentricity: 0.6892
- Orbital period (sidereal): 2.23 yr (813 d)
- Mean anomaly: 305.15°
- Mean motion: 0° 26^{m} 34.44^{s} / day
- Inclination: 8.7443°
- Longitude of ascending node: 34.298°
- Argument of perihelion: 99.395°
- Earth MOID: 0.0027 AU (1.0519 LD)

Physical characteristics
- Mean diameter: 0.897 km (calculated); 1.060±0.346 km
- Synodic rotation period: 4.823 h (Note: Lightcurve plot of (154276) 2002 SY50 from October 2002. Rotation period 4.823 hours with a brightness amplitude of 0.52 mag. Quality code of 3. Summary figures at the LCDB.)
- Geometric albedo: 0.143±0.173; 0.20 (assumed)
- Spectral type: K · S (assumed)
- Absolute magnitude (H): 17.00; 17.6

(154276) 2002 SY_{50} is a stony asteroid on a highly eccentric orbit, classified as near-Earth object and potentially hazardous asteroid of the Apollo group, approximately 1.1 kilometers (0.7 miles) in diameter. It was discovered on 30 September 2002, by astronomers with the Lincoln Near-Earth Asteroid Research at the Lincoln Laboratory's Experimental Test Site near Socorro, New Mexico, in the United States. The K-type asteroid has a rotation period of 4.8 hours. It will make a close encounter with Earth on 30 October 2071.

== Orbit and classification ==
2002 SY_{50} is a member of the Earth-crossing group of Apollo asteroids, the largest group of near-Earth objects with approximately 10 thousand known members.

It orbits the Sun at a distance of 0.53–2.88 AU once every 2 years and 3 months (813 days; semi-major axis of 1.7 AU). Its orbit has an eccentricity of 0.69 and an inclination of 9° with respect to the ecliptic. Due to its large aphelion of 2.88 AU, it also crosses the orbit of Mars at 1.66 AU. The body's observation arc begins one month prior to its official discovery observation with its first observation by the NEAT program at Palomar Observatory in August 2002.

=== Close approaches ===
The asteroid has an Earth minimum orbital intersection distance of 0.0027 AU (404,000 km; 251,000 mi), which corresponds to 1.05 lunar distances and makes it a potentially hazardous asteroid due to its sufficiently large size.

In November 1933, it approached Earth at a nominal distance of 0.098 AU (38 LD), and in November 2002 at 0.084 AU (33 LD). Its closest near-Earth encounter is predicted to occur on 30 October 2071, at a distance of 0.0088 AU (3.4 LD) only (see table).

History of close approaches of large near-Earth objects since 1908 ^{(A)}

| PHA | Date | Approach distance (lunar dist.) | | | Abs. mag (H) | Diameter ^{(C)} (m) | Ref ^{(D)} |
| PHA | Date | Nomi- nal^{(B)} | Mini- mum | Maxi- mum | Abs. mag (H) | Diameter ^{(C)} (m) | Ref ^{(D)} |
|---|---|---|---|---|---|---|---|
| (33342) 1998 WT24 | 1908-12-16 | 3.542 | 3.537 | 3.547 | 17.9 | 556–1795 | data |
| (458732) 2011 MD5 | 1918-09-17 | 0.911 | 0.909 | 0.913 | 17.9 | 556–1795 | data |
| (7482) 1994 PC1 | 1933-01-17 | 2.927 | 2.927 | 2.928 | 16.8 | 749–1357 | data |
| 69230 Hermes | 1937-10-30 | 1.926 | 1.926 | 1.927 | 17.5 | 668–2158 | data |
| 69230 Hermes | 1942-04-26 | 1.651 | 1.651 | 1.651 | 17.5 | 668–2158 | data |
| (137108) 1999 AN10 | 1946-08-07 | 2.432 | 2.429 | 2.435 | 17.9 | 556–1795 | data |
| (33342) 1998 WT24 | 1956-12-16 | 3.523 | 3.523 | 3.523 | 17.9 | 556–1795 | data |
| (163243) 2002 FB3 | 1961-04-12 | 4.903 | 4.900 | 4.906 | 16.4 | 1669–1695 | data |
| (192642) 1999 RD32 | 1969-08-27 | 3.627 | 3.625 | 3.630 | 16.3 | 1161–3750 | data |
| (143651) 2003 QO104 | 1981-05-18 | 2.761 | 2.760 | 2.761 | 16.0 | 1333–4306 | data |
| 2017 CH1 | 1992-06-05 | 4.691 | 3.391 | 6.037 | 17.9 | 556–1795 | data |
| (170086) 2002 XR14 | 1995-06-24 | 4.259 | 4.259 | 4.260 | 18.0 | 531–1714 | data |
| (33342) 1998 WT24 | 2001-12-16 | 4.859 | 4.859 | 4.859 | 17.9 | 556–1795 | data |
| 4179 Toutatis | 2004-09-29 | 4.031 | 4.031 | 4.031 | 15.3 | 2440–2450 | data |
| (671294)2014 JO25 | 2017-04-19 | 4.573 | 4.573 | 4.573 | 17.8 | 582–1879 | data |
| (137108) 1999 AN10 | 2027-08-07 | 1.014 | 1.010 | 1.019 | 17.9 | 556–1795 | data |
| (35396) 1997 XF11 | 2028-10-26 | 2.417 | 2.417 | 2.418 | 16.9 | 881–2845 | data |
| (154276) 2002 SY50 | 2071-10-30 | 3.415 | 3.412 | 3.418 | 17.6 | 714–1406 | data |
| (164121) 2003 YT1 | 2073-04-29 | 4.409 | 4.409 | 4.409 | 16.2 | 1167–2267 | data |
| (385343) 2002 LV | 2076-08-04 | 4.184 | 4.183 | 4.185 | 16.6 | 1011–3266 | data |
| (52768) 1998 OR2 | 2079-04-16 | 4.611 | 4.611 | 4.612 | 15.8 | 1462–4721 | data |
| (33342) 1998 WT24 | 2099-12-18 | 4.919 | 4.919 | 4.919 | 17.9 | 556–1795 | data |
| (85182) 1991 AQ | 2130-01-27 | 4.140 | 4.139 | 4.141 | 17.1 | 1100 | data |
| 314082 Dryope | 2186-07-16 | 3.709 | 2.996 | 4.786 | 17.5 | 668–2158 | data |
| (137126) 1999 CF9 | 2192-08-21 | 4.970 | 4.967 | 4.973 | 18.0 | 531–1714 | data |
| (290772) 2005 VC | 2198-05-05 | 1.951 | 1.791 | 2.134 | 17.6 | 638–2061 | data |
^{(A)} List includes near-Earth approaches of less than 5 lunar distances (LD) of objects with H brighter than 18.^{(B)} Nominal geocentric distance from the Earth's center to the object's center (Earth radius≈0.017 LD).^{(C)} Diameter: estimated, theoretical mean-diameter based on H and albedo range between X and Y.^{(D)} Reference: data source from the JPL SBDB, with AU converted into LD (1 AU≈390 LD)^{(E)} Color codes: unobserved at close approach observed during close approach upcoming approaches

== Physical characteristics ==
Photometry by the Sloan Digital Sky Survey has characterized 2002 SY_{50} as an uncommon K-type asteroid, which is typically seen among members of the Eos family in the asteroid belt.

=== Rotation period ===
In October 2002, a rotational lightcurve of this asteroid was obtained from photometric observations by Italian astronomer Gianluca Masi at the Campo Catino Astronomical Observatory (468). Lightcurve analysis gave a well-defined rotation period of 4.823 hours with a brightness amplitude of 0.52 magnitude (U=3).

=== Diameter and albedo ===
According to the survey carried out by the NEOWISE mission of NASA's Wide-field Infrared Survey Explorer, this asteroid measures 1.06 kilometers in diameter and its surface has an albedo of 0.14, while the Collaborative Asteroid Lightcurve Link assumes a standard albedo for stony asteroids of 0.20 and calculates a diameter of 0.897 kilometers based on an absolute magnitude of 17.6.

== Numbering and naming ==
This minor planet was numbered by the Minor Planet Center on 2 April 2007 (M.P.C. 59337). As of 2018, it has not been named.
