= (385343) 2002 LV =

Asteroid

Discovery
- Discovered by: LINEAR
- Discovery site: Lincoln Lab's ETS
- Discovery date: 1 June 2002

Designations
- Minor planet category: Apollo · NEO · PHA

Orbital characteristics
- Epoch 23 March 2018 (JD 2458200.5)
- Uncertainty parameter 0
- Observation arc: 14.74 yr (5,382 d)
- Aphelion: 3.7146 AU
- Perihelion: 0.9138 AU
- Semi-major axis: 2.3142 AU
- Eccentricity: 0.6051
- Orbital period (sidereal): 3.52 yr (1,286 d)
- Mean anomaly: 148.86°
- Mean motion: 0° 16^{m} 48^{s} / day
- Inclination: 29.541°
- Longitude of ascending node: 132.20°
- Argument of perihelion: 224.20°
- Earth MOID: 0.0071 AU (2.766 LD)

Physical characteristics
- Mean diameter: 1.359±0.555 km 1.42 km (calculated); 1.73 km
- Synodic rotation period: 6.195±0.012 h (Note: Lightcurve by Pravec on 22 July 2002: rotation period 6.195±0.012 hours with a brightness amplitude of 0.94 mag. Quality code of 3. Summary figures for (385343) 2002 LV at the LCDB and Pravec, P.; Wolf, M.; Sarounova, L. (2002) (see data).); 6.20±0.01 h
- Geometric albedo: 0.15; 0.20 (assumed); 0.2158±0.4209
- Spectral type: Sr · S (assumed)
- Absolute magnitude (H): 16.5; 16.60

(385343) 2002 LV is a stony asteroid on a highly eccentric orbit, classified as near-Earth object and potentially hazardous asteroid of the Apollo group, approximately 1.5 kilometers (0.9 miles) in diameter. It was discovered on 1 June 2002, by astronomers with the Lincoln Near-Earth Asteroid Research at the Lincoln Laboratory's Experimental Test Site near Socorro, New Mexico, in the United States. The Sr-type asteroid has a rotation period of 6.2 hours and is likely elongated.

== Orbit and classification ==
2002 LV is a member of the Earth-crossing group of Apollo asteroids, the largest group of near-Earth objects with approximately 10 thousand known members.

It orbits the Sun at a distance of 0.9–3.7 AU once every 3 years and 6 months (1,286 days; semi-major axis of 2.31 AU). Its orbit has an eccentricity of 0.61 and an inclination of 30° with respect to the ecliptic. Due to its large aphelion, it also crosses the orbit of Mars at 1.66 AU. The body's observation arc begins with its official discovery observation at Socorro in June 2002.

=== Close approaches ===
The asteroid has an Earth minimum orbital intersection distance of 0.0071 AU (1,060,000 km; 660,000 mi), which corresponds to 2.7 lunar distances and makes it a potentially hazardous asteroid due to its notably large size. In August 1935, it approached Earth at a nominal distance of 0.035 AU (14 LD), and in July 2002 at 0.112 AU (44 LD). Its closest near-Earth encounter is predicted to occur on 4 August 2076 at a distance of 0.0108 AU (4.2 LD) only (see table).

History of close approaches of large near-Earth objects since 1908 ^{(A)}

PHA	Date	Approach distance (lunar dist.)			Abs. mag (H)	Diameter ^{(C)} (m)	Ref ^{(D)}
PHA	Date	Nomi- nal^{(B)}	Mini- mum	Maxi- mum	Abs. mag (H)	Diameter ^{(C)} (m)	Ref ^{(D)}
(33342) 1998 WT24	1908-12-16	3.542	3.537	3.547	17.9	556–1795	data
(458732) 2011 MD5	1918-09-17	0.911	0.909	0.913	17.9	556–1795	data
(7482) 1994 PC1	1933-01-17	2.927	2.927	2.928	16.8	749–1357	data
69230 Hermes	1937-10-30	1.926	1.926	1.927	17.5	668–2158	data
69230 Hermes	1942-04-26	1.651	1.651	1.651	17.5	668–2158	data
(137108) 1999 AN10	1946-08-07	2.432	2.429	2.435	17.9	556–1795	data
(33342) 1998 WT24	1956-12-16	3.523	3.523	3.523	17.9	556–1795	data
(163243) 2002 FB3	1961-04-12	4.903	4.900	4.906	16.4	1669–1695	data
(192642) 1999 RD32	1969-08-27	3.627	3.625	3.630	16.3	1161–3750	data
(143651) 2003 QO104	1981-05-18	2.761	2.760	2.761	16.0	1333–4306	data
2017 CH1	1992-06-05	4.691	3.391	6.037	17.9	556–1795	data
(170086) 2002 XR14	1995-06-24	4.259	4.259	4.260	18.0	531–1714	data
(33342) 1998 WT24	2001-12-16	4.859	4.859	4.859	17.9	556–1795	data
4179 Toutatis	2004-09-29	4.031	4.031	4.031	15.3	2440–2450	data
(671294)2014 JO25	2017-04-19	4.573	4.573	4.573	17.8	582–1879	data
(137108) 1999 AN10	2027-08-07	1.014	1.010	1.019	17.9	556–1795	data
(35396) 1997 XF11	2028-10-26	2.417	2.417	2.418	16.9	881–2845	data
(154276) 2002 SY50	2071-10-30	3.415	3.412	3.418	17.6	714–1406	data
(164121) 2003 YT1	2073-04-29	4.409	4.409	4.409	16.2	1167–2267	data
(385343) 2002 LV	2076-08-04	4.184	4.183	4.185	16.6	1011–3266	data
(52768) 1998 OR2	2079-04-16	4.611	4.611	4.612	15.8	1462–4721	data
(33342) 1998 WT24	2099-12-18	4.919	4.919	4.919	17.9	556–1795	data
(85182) 1991 AQ	2130-01-27	4.140	4.139	4.141	17.1	1100	data
314082 Dryope	2186-07-16	3.709	2.996	4.786	17.5	668–2158	data
(137126) 1999 CF9	2192-08-21	4.970	4.967	4.973	18.0	531–1714	data
(290772) 2005 VC	2198-05-05	1.951	1.791	2.134	17.6	638–2061	data
^{(A)} List includes near-Earth approaches of less than 5 lunar distances (LD) of objects with H brighter than 18.^{(B)} Nominal geocentric distance from the Earth's center to the object's center (Earth radius≈0.017 LD).^{(C)} Diameter: estimated, theoretical mean-diameter based on H and albedo range between X and Y.^{(D)} Reference: data source from the JPL SBDB, with AU converted into LD (1 AU≈390 LD)^{(E)} Color codes: unobserved at close approach observed during close approach upcoming approaches

== Physical characteristics ==
Observations with the Spitzer Space Telescope characterized this object as an Sr-subtype that transitions from the common, stony S-type asteroids to the uncommon R-types.

=== Rotation period ===
In July 2002, a rotational lightcurve of this asteroid was obtained from photometric observations by Petr Pravec at Ondřejov Observatory in the Czech Republic. Lightcurve analysis gave a well-defined rotation period of 6.195 hours with a high brightness amplitude of 0.93 magnitude, indicative for an elongated, non-spherical shape (U=3). The result agrees with a period of 6.2 hours measured at the Table Mountain Observatory and at the CS3-Palmer Divide Station (U82) in 2009 and 2016, respectively (U=2+/3-).

=== Diameter and albedo ===
According to post-cryogenic observations with the Spitzer Telescope during the ExploreNEOs survey, and observations carried out by the NEOWISE mission of NASA's Wide-field Infrared Survey Explorer, this asteroid measures between 1.359 and 1.73 kilometers in diameter and its surface has an albedo between 0.15 and 0.2158. The Collaborative Asteroid Lightcurve Link assumes a stony standard albedo of 0.20 and calculates a diameter of 1.42 kilometers based on an absolute magnitude of 16.6.

== Numbering and naming ==
This minor planet was numbered by the Minor Planet Center on 14 February 2014 (M.P.C. 87072). As of 2018, it has not been named.
