= Q-type asteroid =

Type of asteroid

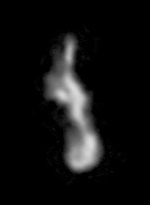
9969 Braille, an example of a Q-type asteroid

Q-type asteroids are relatively common inner-belt asteroids with a strong, broad 1 micrometre olivine and pyroxene feature, and a spectral slope that indicates the presence of metal. There are absorption features shortwards and longwards of 0.7 μm, and the spectrum is generally intermediate between the V and S-type.

A survey of 1,040 Near Earth and inner-belt asteroids found that about 10% of all NEAs belong to this type, making it the third most common among NEAs (behind S-type and Sq-type, but slightly more common than C-type). Q-type asteroids are spectrally more similar to ordinary chondrite meteorites (types H, L, LL).

Examples of Q-type asteroids are: 1862 Apollo, 2102 Tantalus, 3753 Cruithne, 6489 Golevka, and 9969 Braille.

== See also ==
- Asteroid spectral types
