= List of asteroid close approaches to Earth in 2021 =

- Asteroids which came closer to Earth than the Moon in 2021 by time of discovery
- After closest approach: 70 (44.3%)
- < 24 hours before: 33 (20.9%)
- up to 7 days before: 54 (34.2%)
- > one week before: 0 (0.0%)
- > 7 weeks before: 0 (0.0%)
- > one year before: 1 (0.6%)
Other years

- Asteroids which came closer to Earth than the Moon in 2021 by discoverer
- G96 Mt. Lemmon Survey: 53 (33.8%); F51 Pan-STARRS 1, Haleakala: 17 (10.8%); T05 ATLAS-HKO, Haleakala: 13 (8.3%); 381 Tokyo-Kiso: 13 (8.3%); 703 Catalina Sky Survey: 12 (7.6%); T08 ATLAS-MLO, Mauna Loa: 12 (7.6%); I41 ZTF, Palomar Mountain: 10 (6.4%); P07 SST, HEH Station: 9 (5.7%); K88 GINOP-KHK, Piszkesteto: 7 (4.5%); W94 MAP, San Pedro de Atacama: 5 (3.2%); F52 Pan-STARRS 2, Haleakala: 4 (2.5%); V00 Kitt Peak-Bok: 2 (1.3%)

- Prediction accuracy for asteroids of magnitude 27 or larger predicted to pass within 1 lunar distance of Earth in 2021 (Note: Absolute magnitude 27 is the estimated magnitude of the Chelyabinsk meteor, which caused widespread damage and injury, but no deaths. Objects smaller than this are excluded.)
- Unpredicted: 11 (91.7%); Predicted but not observed: 1 (8.3%); Observed but details incorrect: 0 (0.0%); Distance correct but not date: 0 (0.0%); Date correct but not distance: 0 (0.0%); Successfully predicted: 0 (0.0%)

Below is the list of asteroids that have come close to Earth in 2021.

== Timeline of known close approaches less than one lunar distance from Earth ==
A list of known near-Earth asteroid close approaches less than 1 lunar distance (0.0025696 AU (384,410 km; 238,860 mi)) from Earth in 2021, based on the close approach database of the Center for Near-Earth Object Studies (CNEOS).

For reference, the radius of Earth is about 0.0000426 AU (6,370 km; 3,960 mi) or 0.0166 lunar distances. Geosynchronous satellites have an orbit with semi-major axis length of 0.000282 AU (42,200 km; 26,200 mi) or 0.110 lunar distances.

The largest asteroid to pass within 1 LD of Earth in 2021 was 2021 SG with an estimated diameter of around 68 meters and an absolute magnitude of 24.0. The fastest asteroid to pass within 1 LD of Earth in 2021 was 2021 UA_{7} that passed Earth with a velocity with respect to Earth of 27.7 km/s (62,000 mph). (Note: 2021 UA_{7} passed Earth with a velocity with respect to Earth of 27.7 km/s and was moving away from the Sun at 37.0 km/s.)

The CNEOS database of close approaches lists some close approaches a full orbit or more before the discovery of the object, derived by orbit calculation. The list below only includes close approaches that are evidenced by observations, thus the pre-discovery close approaches would only be included if the object was found by precovery, but there was no such close approach in 2021.

This list and the relevant databases do not consider impacts as close approaches, thus this list does not include any of the objects that collided with Earth's atmosphere in 2021, none of which were discovered in advance, but were observed visually or recorded by sensors designed to detect detonation of nuclear devices.

Rows highlighted red indicate objects which were not discovered until after closest approach

Rows highlighted yellow indicate objects discovered less than 24 hours before closest approach

Rows highlighted green indicate objects discovered more than one week before closest approach

Rows highlighted turquoise indicate objects discovered more than 7 weeks before closest approach

Rows highlighted blue indicate objects discovered more than one year before closest approach
(i.e. objects successfully cataloged on a previous orbit, rather than being detected during final approach)

Date of closest approach	Discovery (Note: Discovery date, and if the object was confirmed and previously undiscovered, the discoverer)	Object	Nominal geocentric distance (Note: Distance from the center of Earth to the center of the object. See the NASA/JPL Solar System Dynamics Glossary: Geocentric. Earth has a radius of approximately 6,400 km (0.0166 LD).)		Approx. size (m)	(H) (abs. mag.)	Closer approach to Moon (Note: Objects that approached closer to the Moon than Earth are marked with a check.)
Date of closest approach	Discovery	Object	(AU)	(Lunar distance)	Approx. size (m)	(H) (abs. mag.)	Closer approach to Moon
2021-01-01	2021-01-02; G96 Mt. Lemmon Survey	2021 AA	0.00159 AU (238,000 km; 148,000 mi)	0.617	11–24	27.0	—
2021-01-03	2021-01-03; 703 Catalina Sky Survey	2021 AH	0.000333 AU (49,800 km; 31,000 mi)	0.130	5.3–12	28.5	—
2021-01-04	2021-01-05; G96 Mt. Lemmon Survey	2021 AH_{8}	0.000354 AU (53,000 km; 32,900 mi)	0.138	3.2–7.2	29.6	—
2021-01-09	2021-01-08; G96 Mt. Lemmon Survey	2021 AS_{2}	0.000718 AU (107,400 km; 66,700 mi)	0.279	3.2–7.2	29.6	—
2021-01-16	2021-01-18; G96 Mt. Lemmon Survey	2021 BR_{2}	0.000492 AU (73,600 km; 45,700 mi)	0.192	1.8–4.0	30.9	—
2021-01-18	2021-01-17; G96 Mt. Lemmon Survey	2021 BK	0.000751 AU (112,300 km; 69,800 mi)	0.292	2.3–5.2	30.3	—
2021-01-18	2021-01-17; 703 Catalina Sky Survey	2021 BV_{1}	0.00161 AU (241,000 km; 150,000 mi)	0.625	6.6–15	28.0	—
2021-01-18	2021-01-17; G96 Mt. Lemmon Survey	2021 BO	0.000160 AU (23,900 km; 14,900 mi)	0.062	0.68–1.5	33.0	—
2021-01-20	2021-01-18; G96 Mt. Lemmon Survey	2021 BO_{1}	0.00168 AU (251,000 km; 156,000 mi)	0.653	3.8–8.6	29.2	—
2021-01-26	2018-01-18	2018 BA_{3}	0.00250 AU (374,000 km; 232,000 mi)	0.974	14–31	26.4	—
2021-02-04	2021-02-05; 703 Catalina Sky Survey	2021 CV	0.00135 AU (202,000 km; 125,000 mi)	0.525	4.4–9.9	28.9	—
2021-02-09	2021-02-09; I41 Palomar Mountain—ZTF	2021 CZ_{3}	0.000152 AU (22,700 km; 14,100 mi)	0.059	1.7–3.8	31.0	—
2021-02-11	2021-02-05; 703 Catalina Sky Survey	2021 CO	0.00242 AU (362,000 km; 225,000 mi)	0.942	24–55	25.2	—
2021-02-11	2021-02-11; 703 Catalina Sky Survey	2021 CQ_{5}	0.00119 AU (178,000 km; 111,000 mi)	0.461	5.1–11	28.6	—
2021-02-12	2021-02-11; V00 Kitt Peak-Bok	2021 CC_{6}	0.00113 AU (169,000 km; 105,000 mi)	0.439	2.5–5.5	30.1	—
2021-02-12	2021-02-12; 381 Tokyo-Kiso	2021 CC_{7}	0.00217 AU (325,000 km; 202,000 mi)	0.844	3.0–6.7	29.7	—
2021-02-13	2021-02-10; F51 Pan-STARRS 1, Haleakala	2021 CA_{6}	0.00111 AU (166,000 km; 103,000 mi)	0.431	5.2–12	28.6	—
2021-02-14	2021-02-12; T08 ATLAS-MLO, Mauna Loa	2021 CS_{6}	0.00100 AU (150,000 km; 93,000 mi)	0.391	7.3–16	27.8	—
2021-02-14	2021-02-13; K88 GINOP-KHK, Piszkesteto	2021 CW_{7}	0.000187 AU (28,000 km; 17,400 mi)	0.073	1.5–3.4	31.2	—
2021-02-18	2021-02-18; I41 Palomar Mountain—ZTF	2021 DN_{1}	0.00226 AU (338,000 km; 210,000 mi)	0.878	6.3–14	28.1	—
2021-02-18	2021-02-17; G96 Mt. Lemmon Survey	2021 DG	0.00111 AU (166,000 km; 103,000 mi)	0.431	2.2–4.9	30.4	—
2021-02-21	2021-02-22; K88 GINOP-KHK, Piszkesteto	2021 DA_{2}	0.00132 AU (197,000 km; 123,000 mi)	0.512	3.9–8.7	29.2	—
2021-03-02	2021-03-01; K88 GINOP-KHK, Piszkesteto	2021 EA	0.000627 AU (93,800 km; 58,300 mi)	0.244	6.3–14	28.1	—
2021-03-08	2021-03-06; G96 Mt. Lemmon Survey	2021 EF_{1}	0.00187 AU (280,000 km; 174,000 mi)	0.729	3.1–6.8	29.7	✓
2021-03-09	2021-03-10; G96 Mt. Lemmon Survey	2021 EG_{3}	0.000981 AU (146,800 km; 91,200 mi)	0.382	3.8–8.6	29.2	—
2021-03-15	2021-03-15; T08 ATLAS-MLO, Mauna Loa	2021 EN_{4}	0.000473 AU (70,800 km; 44,000 mi)	0.184	3.1–6.9	29.7	—
2021-03-15	2021-03-15; 381 Tokyo-Kiso	2021 EP_{4}	0.00248 AU (371,000 km; 231,000 mi)	0.967	3.7–8.4	29.3	—
2021-03-16	2021-03-11; G96 Mt. Lemmon Survey	2021 EQ_{3}	0.00186 AU (278,000 km; 173,000 mi)	0.724	16–36	26.1	✓
2021-03-20	2021-03-22; G96 Mt. Lemmon Survey	2021 FM_{2}	0.000559 AU (83,600 km; 52,000 mi)	0.218	2.3–5.2	30.3	—
2021-03-21	2021-03-22; G96 Mt. Lemmon Survey	2021 FF_{2}	0.00213 AU (319,000 km; 198,000 mi)	0.829	6.3–14	28.1	—
2021-03-23	2021-03-20; G96 Mt. Lemmon Survey	2021 FO_{1}	0.00215 AU (322,000 km; 200,000 mi)	0.836	3.4–7.6	29.5	—
2021-03-23	2021-03-18; G96 Mt. Lemmon Survey	2021 FH	0.00157 AU (235,000 km; 146,000 mi)	0.612	12–27	26.8	—
2021-03-23	2021-03-22; G96 Mt. Lemmon Survey	2021 FP_{2}	0.00216 AU (323,000 km; 201,000 mi)	0.841	2.5–5.6	30.1	—
2021-04-03	2021-04-04; G96 Mt. Lemmon Survey	2021 GE_{2}	0.00161 AU (241,000 km; 150,000 mi)	0.625	3.9–8.8	29.1	—
2021-04-04	2021-04-03; G96 Mt. Lemmon Survey	2021 GV	0.00224 AU (335,000 km; 208,000 mi)	0.872	3.8–8.6	29.2	—
2021-04-05	2021-04-03; G96 Mt. Lemmon Survey	2021 GS	0.00167 AU (250,000 km; 155,000 mi)	0.649	4.8–11	28.7	—
2021-04-05	2021-04-05; I41 Palomar Mountain—ZTF	2021 GZ_{7}	0.00126 AU (188,000 km; 117,000 mi)	0.492	4.3–9.6	28.9	✓
2021-04-08	2021-04-08; 381 Tokyo-Kiso	2021 GV_{4}	0.00212 AU (317,000 km; 197,000 mi)	0.824	4.3–9.6	29.0	—
2021-04-09	2021-04-11; T08 ATLAS-MLO, Mauna Loa	2021 GL_{16}	0.00247 AU (370,000 km; 230,000 mi)	0.959	15–33	26.3	✓
2021-04-10	2021-04-06; F51 Pan-STARRS 1, Haleakala	2021 GT_{3}	0.00171 AU (256,000 km; 159,000 mi)	0.665	14–32	26.4	—
2021-04-10	2021-04-10; 381 Tokyo-Kiso	2021 GE_{226} (ex TMG0042)	0.00220 AU (329,000 km; 205,000 mi)	0.855	5.5–12	28.4	—
2021-04-11	2021-04-10; 703 Catalina Sky Survey	2021 GQ_{5}	0.00248 AU (371,000 km; 231,000 mi)	0.966	5.3–12	28.5	—
2021-04-11	2021-04-11; 381 Tokyo-Kiso	2021 GA_{168}	0.00156 AU (233,000 km; 145,000 mi)	0.608	4.5–10	28.9	—
2021-04-12	2021-04-08; G96 Mt. Lemmon Survey	2021 GW4	0.000175 AU (26,200 km; 16,300 mi)	0.068	3.4–7.6	29.5	—
2021-04-13	2021-04-13; I41 Palomar Mountain—ZTF	2021 GC_{13}	0.00228 AU (341,000 km; 212,000 mi)	0.888	4.0–8.9	29.1	—
2021-04-13	2021-04-11; V00 Kitt Peak-Bok	2021 GC_{8}	0.00146 AU (218,000 km; 136,000 mi)	0.567	2.0–4.5	30.6	—
2021-04-14	2021-04-14; 381 Tokyo-Kiso	2021 GQ_{10}	0.00116 AU (174,000 km; 108,000 mi)	0.453	13–28	26.6	—
2021-04-14	2021-04-15; T08 ATLAS-MLO, Mauna Loa	2021 GW_{16}	0.000195 AU (29,200 km; 18,100 mi)	0.076	2.5–5.7	30.1	—
2021-04-15	2021-04-17; T05 ATLAS-HKO, Haleakala	2021 HC_{1}	0.00155 AU (232,000 km; 144,000 mi)	0.601	6.8–15	28.0	✓
2021-04-15	2021-04-14; W94 MAP, San Pedro de Atacama	2021 GF_{10}	0.000774 AU (115,800 km; 71,900 mi)	0.301	6.2–14	28.2	—
2021-04-15	2021-04-14; F51 Pan-STARRS 1, Haleakala	2021 GN_{10}	0.00192 AU (287,000 km; 178,000 mi)	0.748	5.6–12	28.4	✓
2021-04-17	2021-04-18; 703 Catalina Sky Survey	2021 HE_{1}	0.00153 AU (229,000 km; 142,000 mi)	0.594	4.4–9.7	28.9	✓
2021-04-19	2021-04-17; G96 Mt. Lemmon Survey	2021 HN	0.00170 AU (254,000 km; 158,000 mi)	0.661	11–25	26.9	—
2021-04-23	2021-04-23; P07 Space Surveillance Telescope, HEH Station	2021 HE_{41}	0.00251 AU (375,000 km; 233,000 mi)	0.977	4.7–11	28.8	?
2021-05-02	2021-05-03; T05 ATLAS-HKO, Haleakala	2021 JW	0.00173 AU (259,000 km; 161,000 mi)	0.675	8.0–18	27.6	—
2021-05-04	2021-05-03; T05 ATLAS-HKO, Haleakala	2021 JV	0.000936 AU (140,000 km; 87,000 mi)	0.364	8.6–19	27.4	—
2021-05-06	2021-05-05; G96 Mt. Lemmon Survey	2021 JS_{1}	0.000739 AU (110,600 km; 68,700 mi)	0.288	5.3–12	28.5	—
2021-05-08	2021-05-07; G96 Mt. Lemmon Survey	2021 JQ_{2}	0.000449 AU (67,200 km; 41,700 mi)	0.175	2.6–5.9	30.0	—
2021-05-13	2021-05-08; F51 Pan-STARRS 1, Haleakala	2021 JB_{6}	0.000706 AU (105,600 km; 65,600 mi)	0.275	4.7–10	28.8	—
2021-05-14	2021-05-14; I41 Palomar Mountain—ZTF	2021 JU_{6}	0.000442 AU (66,100 km; 41,100 mi)	0.172	10–23	27.1	—
2021-05-15	2021-05-15; P07 Space Surveillance Telescope, HEH Station	2021 JH_{83}	0.00104 AU (156,000 km; 97,000 mi)	0.403	0.85–1.9	32.5	?
2021-05-16	2021-05-16; P07 Space Surveillance Telescope, HEH Station	2021 KQ_{22}	0.00203 AU (304,000 km; 189,000 mi)	0.789	1.0–2.3	32.0	?
2021-05-27	2021-06-01; F51 Pan-STARRS 1, Haleakala	2021 LV	0.00188 AU (281,000 km; 175,000 mi)	0.730	6.9–15	27.9	✓
2021-05-30	2021-05-30; 381 Tokyo-Kiso	2021 KO_{2}	0.00248 AU (371,000 km; 231,000 mi)	0.964	6.6–15	28.0	—
2021-05-30	2021-05-30; 381 Tokyo-Kiso	2021 KB_{22} (ex TMG0049)	0.000726 AU (108,600 km; 67,500 mi)	0.282	2.7–6.0	30.0	—
2021-05-31	2021-05-30; 381 Tokyo-Kiso	2021 KN_{2}	0.000966 AU (144,500 km; 89,800 mi)	0.376	5.0–11	28.6	—
2021-05-31	2021-05-31; 381 Tokyo-Kiso	2021 KQ_{2}	0.00119 AU (178,000 km; 111,000 mi)	0.461	2.7–6.1	30.0	—
2021-06-01	2021-05-31; G96 Mt. Lemmon Survey	2021 KT_{2}	0.00195 AU (292,000 km; 181,000 mi)	0.758	5.6–12	28.4	—
2021-06-04	2021-06-05; T05 ATLAS-HKO, Haleakala	2021 LX_{1}	0.00107 AU (160,000 km; 99,000 mi)	0.415	10–23	27.1	—
2021-06-12	2021-06-11; F51 Pan-STARRS 1, Haleakala	2021 LG_{5}	0.00106 AU (159,000 km; 99,000 mi)	0.41	4.8–11	28.7	—
2021-06-13	2021-06-08; G96 Mt. Lemmon Survey	2021 LO_{2}	0.00148 AU (221,000 km; 138,000 mi)	0.58	6.6–15	28.0	—
2021-06-15	2021-06-18; W94 MAP, San Pedro de Atacama	2021 MU	0.00111 AU (166,000 km; 103,000 mi)	0.43	8.8–20	27.4	—
2021-06-17	2021-06-17; T05 ATLAS-HKO, Haleakala	2021 ME	0.00212 AU (317,000 km; 197,000 mi)	0.824	4.3–9.6	29.0	—
2021-07-03	2021-07-01; F51 Pan-STARRS 1, Haleakala	2021 NA	0.000436 AU (65,200 km; 40,500 mi)	0.170	5.2–12	28.6	—
2021-07-08	2021-07-09; F51 Pan-STARRS 1, Haleakala	2021 NU_{3}	0.00120 AU (180,000 km; 112,000 mi)	0.465	5.0–11	28.6	—
2021-07-20	2021-07-19; W94 MAP, San Pedro de Atacama	2021 OV	0.00131 AU (196,000 km; 122,000 mi)	0.510	7.5–17	27.8	✓
2021-07-31	2021-07-30; T08 ATLAS-MLO, Mauna Loa	2021 OD_{1}	0.00170 AU (254,000 km; 158,000 mi)	0.662	5.9–13	28.3	—
2021-08-02	2021-08-02; I41 Palomar Mountain—ZTF	2021 PC	0.00110 AU (165,000 km; 102,000 mi)	0.427	12–27	26.7	—
2021-08-02	2021-08-02; T08 ATLAS-MLO	2021 PL_{132}	0.00233 AU (349,000 km; 217,000 mi)	0.905	6.1–14	28.2	—
2021-08-05	2021-08-07; F51 Pan-STARRS 1, Haleakala	2021 PY_{4}	0.00188 AU (281,000 km; 175,000 mi)	0.731	13–29	26.5	—
2021-08-06	2021-08-08; W94 MAP, San Pedro de Atacama	2021 PK_{4}	0.00160 AU (239,000 km; 149,000 mi)	0.622	6.1–14	28.2	—
2021-08-14	2021-08-15; T05 ATLAS-HKO, Haleakala	2021 PA_{17}	0.000447 AU (66,900 km; 41,600 mi)	0.174	7.3–16	27.8	—
2021-08-27	2021-08-27; T05 ATLAS-HKO, Haleakala	2021 QD_{1}	0.00204 AU (305,000 km; 190,000 mi)	0.796	4.8–11	28.7	—
2021-08-28	2021-08-30; F51 Pan-STARRS 1, Haleakala	2021 QV_{3}	0.000854 AU (127,800 km; 79,400 mi)	0.332	2.4–5.3	30.2	—
2021-09-02	2021-09-03; I41 Palomar Mountain—ZTF	2021 RN_{5}	0.00253 AU (378,000 km; 235,000 mi)	0.985	8.1–18	27.6	✓
2021-09-02	2021-09-05; K88 GINOP-KHK, Piszkesteto	2021 RD_{239}	0.00147 AU (220,000 km; 137,000 mi)	0.570	5.6–12	28.4	?
2021-09-06	2021-09-08; F51 Pan-STARRS 1, Haleakala	2021 RT_{4}	0.00177 AU (265,000 km; 165,000 mi)	0.689	6.2–14	28.2	—
2021-09-07	2021-09-08; F51 Pan-STARRS 1, Haleakala	2021 RS_{100}	0.00128 AU (191,000 km; 119,000 mi)	0.498	4.7–11	28.8	✓
2021-09-08	2021-09-07; G96 Mt. Lemmon Survey	2021 RS_{2}	0.000145 AU (21,700 km; 13,500 mi)	0.056	2.3–5.1	30.4	—
2021-09-08	2021-09-07; 703 Catalina Sky Survey	2021 RP_{2}	0.000802 AU (120,000 km; 74,600 mi)	0.312	2.3–5.2	30.3	✓
2021-09-08	2021-09-09; K88 GINOP-KHK, Piszkesteto	2021 RS_{5}	0.000921 AU (137,800 km; 85,600 mi)	0.358	5.7–13	28.4	—
2021-09-09	2021-09-05; T05 ATLAS-HKO, Haleakala	2021 RQ_{2}	0.00126 AU (188,000 km; 117,000 mi)	0.489	3.3–7.3	29.5	—
2021-09-09	2021-09-10; 703 Catalina Sky Survey	2021 RB_{6}	0.00172 AU (257,000 km; 160,000 mi)	0.671	6.6–15	28.0	—
2021-09-11	2021-09-10; T05 ATLAS-HKO, Haleakala	2021 RG_{6}	0.000569 AU (85,100 km; 52,900 mi)	0.221	4.4–9.8	28.9	—
2021-09-11	2021-09-12; T08 ATLAS-MLO, Mauna Loa	2021 RG_{12}	0.00217 AU (325,000 km; 202,000 mi)	0.843	3.9–8.7	29.2	—
2021-09-12	2021-09-08; G96 Mt. Lemmon Survey	2021 RR_{5}	0.000527 AU (78,800 km; 49,000 mi)	0.205	5.6–12	28.4	—
2021-09-16	2021-09-13; F51 Pan-STARRS 1, Haleakala	2021 RF_{16}	0.00213 AU (319,000 km; 198,000 mi)	0.829	4.3–9.6	29.0	—
2021-09-16	2021-09-17; I41 Palomar Mountain—ZTF	2021 SG	0.00164 AU (245,000 km; 152,000 mi)	0.637	42–94	24.0	—
2021-09-17	2021-09-17; I41 Palomar Mountain—ZTF	2021 SP	0.0000943 AU (14,110 km; 8,770 mi)	0.037	3.7–8.4	29.3	—
2021-09-20	2021-09-23; F51 Pan-STARRS 1, Haleakala	2021 SQ	0.00184 AU (275,000 km; 171,000 mi)	0.717	5.5–12	28.4	✓
2021-09-26	2021-09-28; F52 Pan-STARRS 2, Haleakala	2021 SW_{1}	0.00182 AU (272,000 km; 169,000 mi)	0.707	2.9–6.5	29.8	—
2021-09-27	2021-09-28; T05 ATLAS-HKO, Haleakala	2021 SQ_{1}	0.00111 AU (166,000 km; 103,000 mi)	0.432	4.6–10	28.8	—
2021-09-30	2021-10-02; G96 Mt. Lemmon Survey	2021 TT	0.000886 AU (132,500 km; 82,400 mi)	0.345	6.9–15	27.9	—
2021-10-01	2021-10-02; F52 Pan-STARRS 2, Haleakala	2021 TX	0.000283 AU (42,300 km; 26,300 mi)	0.110	1.5–3.5	31.2	—
2021-10-03	2021-10-03; T08 ATLAS-MLO, Mauna Loa	2021 TV_{1}	0.00108 AU (162,000 km; 100,000 mi)	0.419	6.1–14	28.2	—
2021-10-03	2021-10-03; G96 Mt. Lemmon Survey	2021 TG_{1}	0.00196 AU (293,000 km; 182,000 mi)	0.762	6.1–14	28.2	—
2021-10-06	2021-10-06; 381 Tokyo-Kiso	2021 TQ_{4}	0.00255 AU (381,000 km; 237,000 mi)	0.992	2.7–6.1	29.9	—
2021-10-10	2021-10-03; F52 Pan-STARRS 2, Haleakala	2021 TT_{1}	0.00251 AU (375,000 km; 233,000 mi)	0.975	15–34	26.2	✓
2021-10-11	2021-10-11; T05 ATLAS-HKO, Haleakala	2021 TK_{11}	0.000909 AU (136,000 km; 84,500 mi)	0.354	5.2–12	28.6	—
2021-10-11	2021-10-11; T05 ATLAS-HKO, Haleakala	2021 TT_{13}	0.000358 AU (53,600 km; 33,300 mi)	0.139	3.1–6.8	29.7	—
2021-10-11	2021-10-13; F51 Pan-STARRS 1, Haleakala	2021 TH_{15}	0.00211 AU (316,000 km; 196,000 mi)	0.819	4.5–10	28.9	✓
2021-10-12	2021-10-13; G96 Mt. Lemmon Survey	2021 TE_{13}	0.000180 AU (26,900 km; 16,700 mi)	0.070	3.6–8.0	29.4	—
2021-10-14	2021-10-14; T05 ATLAS-HKO, Haleakala	2021 TM_{14}	0.000980 AU (146,600 km; 91,100 mi)	0.381	6.7–15	28.0	—
2021-10-16	2021-10-16; 703 Catalina Sky Survey	2021 UL	0.000241 AU (36,100 km; 22,400 mi)	0.094	2.3–5.2	30.3	✓
2021-10-16	2021-10-14; G96 Mt. Lemmon Survey	2021 TJ_{15}	0.00257 AU (384,000 km; 239,000 mi)	1.000	5.5–12	28.4	—
2021-10-17	2021-10-17; P07 Space Surveillance Telescope, HEH Station	2021 UR_{132}	0.00161 AU (241,000 km; 150,000 mi)	0.626	6.1–14	28.2	?
2021-10-18	2021-10-11; F51 Pan-STARRS 1, Haleakala	2021 TG_{14}	0.00167 AU (250,000 km; 155,000 mi)	0.650	6.1–14	28.2	—
2021-10-24	2021-10-24; K88 GINOP-KHK, Piszkesteto	2021 UT	0.00100 AU (150,000 km; 93,000 mi)	0.39	3.7–8.2	29.3	—
2021-10-25	2021-10-26; G96 Mt. Lemmon Survey	2021 UO_{1}	0.00102 AU (153,000 km; 95,000 mi)	0.40	6.6–15	28.0	—
2021-10-25	2021-10-25; 703 Catalina Sky Survey	2021 UA1	0.0000630 AU (9,420 km; 5,860 mi)	0.025	1.1–2.5	31.8	—
2021-10-27	2021-10-28; G96 Mt. Lemmon Survey	2021 UA_{7}	0.000857 AU (128,200 km; 79,700 mi)	0.333	4.7–11	28.8	—
2021-10-27	2021-10-26; G96 Mt. Lemmon Survey	2021 UH_{1}	0.000480 AU (71,800 km; 44,600 mi)	0.187	1.2–2.8	31.7	—
2021-10-29	2021-10-30; W94 MAP, San Pedro de Atacama	2021 UV_{5}	0.000774 AU (115,800 km; 71,900 mi)	0.301	4.6–10	28.8	—
2021-10-29	2021-10-31; K88 GINOP-KHK, Piszkesteto	2021 UT_{5}	0.00205 AU (307,000 km; 191,000 mi)	0.797	5.7–13	28.4	—
2021-10-29	2021-10-29; 381 Tokyo-Kiso	2021 UF_{12}	0.00161 AU (241,000 km; 150,000 mi)	0.628	3.7–8.2	29.3	—
2021-10-29	2021-10-29; P07 Space Surveillance Telescope, HEH Station	2021 UP_{120}	0.000404 AU (60,400 km; 37,600 mi)	0.157	0.83–1.9	32.5	?
2021-10-30	2021-10-30; P07 Space Surveillance Telescope, HEH Station	2021 UO_{120}	0.00109 AU (163,000 km; 101,000 mi)	0.423	1.2–2.6	31.8	?
2021-10-30	2021-10-27; G96 Mt. Lemmon Survey	2021 UW_{1}	0.00256 AU (383,000 km; 238,000 mi)	0.995	16–35	26.2	—
2021-10-30	2021-10-31; T08 ATLAS-MLO, Mauna Loa	2021 UJ_{6}	0.00232 AU (347,000 km; 216,000 mi)	0.901	6.0–13	28.3	—
2021-11-01	2021-11-02; T08 ATLAS-MLO, Mauna Loa	2021 VH	0.000196 AU (29,300 km; 18,200 mi)	0.076	3.2–7.0	29.6	—
2021-11-01	2021-10-29; P07 Space Surveillance Telescope, HEH Station	2021 VK_{96}	0.00245 AU (367,000 km; 228,000 mi)	0.955	2.2–4.9	30.4	?
2021-11-04	2021-11-04; P07 Space Surveillance Telescope, HEH Station	2021 VL_{96}	0.00206 AU (308,000 km; 191,000 mi)	0.802	2.4–5.3	30.3	?
2021-11-04	2021-10-31; F51 Pan-STARRS 1, Haleakala	2021 UO_{7}	0.00247 AU (370,000 km; 230,000 mi)	0.963	3.3–7.3	29.6	—
2021-11-07	2021-11-11; G96 Mt. Lemmon Survey	2021 VS_{11}	0.00204 AU (305,000 km; 190,000 mi)	0.792	4.8–11	28.7	—
2021-11-07	2021-11-06; G96 Mt. Lemmon Survey	2021 VK_{3}	0.000567 AU (84,800 km; 52,700 mi)	0.221	2.2–4.8	30.5	—
2021-11-08	2021-11-07; T08 ATLAS-MLO, Mauna Loa	2021 VL_{3}	0.00111 AU (166,000 km; 103,000 mi)	0.433	5.4–12	28.5	—
2021-11-08	2021-11-07; G96 Mt. Lemmon Survey	2021 VN_{3}	0.000919 AU (137,500 km; 85,400 mi)	0.358	2.0–4.5	30.6	—
2021-11-08	2021-11-07; G96 Mt. Lemmon Survey	2021 VM_{3}	0.00204 AU (305,000 km; 190,000 mi)	0.793	2.8–6.3	29.9	—
2021-11-09	2021-11-10; G96 Mt. Lemmon Survey	2021 VD_{8}	0.000831 AU (124,300 km; 77,200 mi)	0.324	2.2–5.0	30.4	—
2021-11-09	2021-11-09; G96 Mt. Lemmon Survey	2021 VP_{11}	0.000385 AU (57,600 km; 35,800 mi)	0.150	1.2–2.6	31.8	—
2021-11-09	2021-11-09; P07 Space Surveillance Telescope, HEH Station	2021 VM_{96}	0.00168 AU (251,000 km; 156,000 mi)	0.656	1.0–2.3	32.0	?
2021-11-10	2021-11-08; F52 Pan-STARRS 2, Haleakala	2021 VU_{4}	0.000724 AU (108,300 km; 67,300 mi)	0.282	5.5–12	28.4	—
2021-11-11	2021-11-10; G96 Mt. Lemmon Survey	2021 VY_{7}	0.00214 AU (320,000 km; 199,000 mi)	0.832	3.5–7.9	29.4	—
2021-11-12	2021-11-10; G96 Mt. Lemmon Survey	2021 VC_{7}	0.00124 AU (186,000 km; 115,000 mi)	0.481	5.8–13	28.3	—
2021-11-21	2021-11-24; T08 ATLAS-MLO, Mauna Loa	2021 WP	0.00104 AU (156,000 km; 97,000 mi)	0.405	7.1–16	27.9	—
2021-11-26	2021-11-27; 703 Catalina Sky Survey	2021 WA_{1}	0.00206 AU (308,000 km; 191,000 mi)	0.802	7.7–17	27.7	✓
2021-11-28	2021-11-27; G96 Mt. Lemmon Survey	2021 WC_{1}	0.00136 AU (203,000 km; 126,000 mi)	0.530	5.3–12	28.5	—
2021-11-30	2021-12-02; G96 Mt. Lemmon Survey	2021 XV	0.000991 AU (148,300 km; 92,100 mi)	0.386	2.5–5.7	30.1	—
2021-12-01	2021-11-29; G96 Mt. Lemmon Survey	2021 WF_{3}	0.000959 AU (143,500 km; 89,100 mi)	0.373	3.5–7.8	29.4	—
2021-12-01	2021-12-02; I41 Palomar Mountain—ZTF	2021 XL	0.00135 AU (202,000 km; 125,000 mi)	0.526	4.6–10	28.8	—
2021-12-04	2021-12-02; G96 Mt. Lemmon Survey	2021 XF_{1}	0.00206 AU (308,000 km; 191,000 mi)	0.803	3.3–7.3	29.5	—
2021-12-05	2021-12-03; G96 Mt. Lemmon Survey	2021 XC_{2}	0.00212 AU (317,000 km; 197,000 mi)	0.823	3.0–6.6	29.8	—
2021-12-09	2021-12-12; G96 Mt. Lemmon Survey	2021 XZ_{5}	0.00214 AU (320,000 km; 199,000 mi)	0.834	5.8–13	28.3	✓
2021-12-09	2021-12-08; G96 Mt. Lemmon Survey	2021 XU_{5}	0.00160 AU (239,000 km; 149,000 mi)	0.623	3.5–7.8	29.4	✓
2021-12-10	2021-12-08; G96 Mt. Lemmon Survey	2021 XV_{4}	0.00120 AU (180,000 km; 112,000 mi)	0.467	5.0–11	28.6	—
2021-12-11	2021-12-08; G96 Mt. Lemmon Survey	2021 XX_{4}	0.00251 AU (375,000 km; 233,000 mi)	0.977	5.1–11	28.6	—
2021-12-11	2021-12-11; 381 Tokyo-Kiso	2021 XA_{11}	0.000617 AU (92,300 km; 57,400 mi)	0.240	5.8–13	28.3	—
2021-12-16	2021-12-12; G96 Mt. Lemmon Survey	2021 XC_{6}	0.00140 AU (209,000 km; 130,000 mi)	0.544	5.8–13	28.3	✓

Date of closest approach	Discovery	Object	Nominal geocentric distance		Approx. size (m)	(H) (abs. mag.)	Closer approach to Moon
Date of closest approach	Discovery	Object	(AU)	( Lunar distance) (Note: For unconfirmed asteroids, the provided distance range is for the 25th and 75th percentile. As a result, there is a 50% chance the asteroid's approach distance was outside of this range. Additionally, the uncertainty is usually asymmetric, so an asteroid at a nominal distance of 0.4-0.7 LD may have been more likely to only approach to 1.0 LD than to 0.3 LD.)	Approx. size (m)	(H) (abs. mag.)	Closer approach to Moon
2021-03-01	2021-03-02	ZTF0KfF	0.00187 AU (280,000 km; 174,000 mi)	0.73 (Note: Distance error: 0.0015 AU, approach range: 0.27 to 1.40 LD. There was a roughly 0.6% chance of impact.)	0.96–5.9	31.0	?
2021-03-07	2021-03-06	C4YK182	0.000632 AU (94,500 km; 58,700 mi)	0.25 (Note: Distance error: 0.000097 AU, approach range: 0.21 to 0.28 LD.)	1.8–5.9	30.3	—
2021-03-10	2021-03-11	ScKo07a	0.0013 AU (190,000 km; 120,000 mi)	0.51 (Note: Distance error: 0.0005 AU, approach range: 0.28 to 0.66 LD.)	0.97–5.9	31.0	—
2021-03-23	2021-03-23	B03SK22	0.00019 AU (28,000 km; 18,000 mi)	0.074 (Note: Distance error: 0.00011 AU, approach range 0.037 to 0.12 LD. There was a roughly 11.7% chance of impact.)	0.38–2.4	33.0	—
2021-04-01	2021-04-01	A10w8qG	0.00149 AU (223,000 km; 139,000 mi)	0.58 (Note: Distance error: 0.000082 AU, approach range: 0.55 to 0.61 LD.)	3.2–12	28.9	✓
2021-04-03	2021-04-06	P11ekJ0	0.00188 AU (281,000 km; 175,000 mi)	0.73 (Note: Distance error: 0.0015 AU, approach range: 0.40 to 1.67 LD.)	2.9–18	28.6	—
2021-04-06	2021-04-07	P11eyxx	0.00024 AU (36,000 km; 22,000 mi)	0.093 (Note: Distance error: 0.00004 AU, approach range: 0.082 to 0.11 LD.)	1.4–5.4	30.7	—
2021-04-08	2021-04-07	A10wiOp	0.00224 AU (335,000 km; 208,000 mi)	0.87 (Note: Distance error: 0.0008 AU, approach range: 0.64 to 1.28 LD.)	2.8–17	28.7	—
2021-04-11	2021-04-11	TMG0044	0.00126 AU (188,000 km; 117,000 mi)	0.49 (Note: Distance error: 0.0000170 AU, approach range: 0.48 to 0.51 LD.)	2.5–9.9	29.4	—
2021-04-11	2021-04-07	P11exfR	0.00244 AU (365,000 km; 227,000 mi)	0.95 (Note: Distance error: >0.001 AU, approach range: 0.18 to 93 LD. Although highly asymmetric, there is still a 56% chance the asteroid passed within 2 LD of Earth, and a 15% chance it passed within 7 Earth radii of the planet.)	3.1–19	28.5	—
2021-04-11	2021-04-11	TMG0045	0.00156 AU (233,000 km; 145,000 mi)	0.61 (Note: Distance error: 0.000000822 AU.)	3.7–12	28.8	—
2021-04-13	2021-04-13	ZTF0KwS	0.00105 AU (157,000 km; 98,000 mi)	0.41 (Note: Distance error: 0.0009 AU, approach range: 0.13 to 0.86 LD. There was a roughly 2.2% chance of impact.)	2.4–15	29.0	?
2021-04-16	2021-04-17	ZTF0KyD	0.00213 AU (319,000 km; 198,000 mi)	0.83 (Note: Distance uncertainty: 0.00070 AU, approach range: 0.58 to 1.07 LD.)	3.2–20	28.4	?
2021-04-17	2021-04-14	P11f7ua	0.00108 AU (162,000 km; 100,000 mi)	0.42 (Note: Distance error: 0.000166 AU, approach range: 0.35 to 0.48 LD.)	2.9–9.4	29.3	—
2021-04-17	2021-04-17	B04SK17	0.00106 AU (159,000 km; 99,000 mi)	0.41 (Note: Distance error: 0.0009 AU, approach range: 0.14 to 0.89 LD.)	3.1–30	28.0	?
2021-04-23	2021-04-25	A10wMMp	0.000735 AU (110,000 km; 68,300 mi)	0.29 (Note: Distance error: 0.00078 AU, approach range: 0.077 to 0.70 LD. There was a roughly 5% chance of impact.)	2.5–16	28.9	?
2021-04-24	2021-04-24	ZTF0Kzz	0.0016 AU (240,000 km; 150,000 mi)	0.62 (Note: Distance error: highly asymmetric, approach range: 0.011 to 30.7 LD. There was a roughly 38% chance of impact.)	1.2–7.5	30.5	?
2021-05-02	2021-05-02	S514008	0.00079 AU (118,000 km; 73,000 mi)	0.31 (Note: Distance error: 0.001 AU, approach range: 0.066 to 0.86 LD. There was a roughly 12.1% chance of impact.)	2.4–15	29.0	?
2021-05-07	2021-05-09	P11gae7	0.00126 AU (188,000 km; 117,000 mi)	0.49 (Note: Distance error: 0.0004 AU, approach range: 0.37 to 0.68 LD.)	3.1–19	28.5	—
2021-05-08	2021-05-09	P11gae5	0.00057 AU (85,000 km; 53,000 mi)	0.22 (Note: Distance error: 0.00022 AU, approach range: 0.16 to 0.38 LD.)	1.3–8.2	30.3	—
2021-05-09	2021-05-12	P11ggM3	0.00235 AU (352,000 km; 218,000 mi)	0.91 (Note: Distance error: 0.0010 AU, approach range: 0.61 to 1.51 LD.)	1.2–7.5	30.5	—
2021-05-31	2021-05-31	C5Q2Z32	0.0000774 AU (11,580 km; 7,190 mi)	0.030 (Note: Distance error: 0.00002 AU, approach range: 0.024 to 0.041 LD. There was a roughly 5.6% chance of impact.)	0.67–4.1	31.8	—

=== Warning times by size ===
This sub-section visualises the warning times of the close approaches listed in the table of confirmed close approaches, depending on the size of the asteroid. It shows the effectiveness of asteroid warning systems at detecting close approaches in 2021. The sizes of the charts show the relative sizes of the asteroids to scale. For comparison, the approximate size of a person is also shown. This is based the absolute magnitude of each asteroid, an approximate measure of size based on brightness.

Absolute magnitude H ≥ 30 (smallest)

Silhouette of man standing and facing forward

(size of a person for comparison)

Absolute magnitude 30 > H ≥ 29

Absolute magnitude 29 > H ≥ 28

Absolute magnitude 28 > H ≥ 27

Absolute magnitude 27 > H ≥ 26 (probable size of the Chelyabinsk meteor)

Absolute magnitude 26 > H ≥ 25

Absolute magnitude 25 > H (largest)

- After closest approach: 1 (100.0%)
- < 24 hours before: 0 (0.0%)
- up to 7 days before: 0 (0.0%)
- > one week before: 0 (0.0%)
- > 7 weeks before: 0 (0.0%)
- > one year before: 0 (0.0%)

=== Predicted close approaches ===
Below is the list of predicted close approaches of near-Earth asteroids larger than magnitude 27, that were predicted to occur in 2021. This relates to the effectiveness of asteroid cataloging systems at predicting close approaches in 2021. 2018 BA_{3} (with a 9 day observation arc from January 2018) could have passed as far as 3 million km (8 LD) from Earth.

For asteroids which were observed but not predicted in advance, see the main list above.

Rows highlighted orange indicate objects which were predicted theoretically but were not observed in practice

Rows highlighted yellow indicate objects which were predicted and observed but the predicted close approach date and distance were incorrect

Rows highlighted green indicate objects which were observed with the predicted close approach distance (within +/-50%) but wrong date

Rows highlighted turquoise indicate objects which were observed with the predicted close approach date but wrong distance (out by over 50%)

Rows highlighted blue indicate objects which were observed as predicted with the correct close approach date and distance

Object	Predicted Date of closest approach	Actual Date of closest approach	Predicted closest approach range (Lunar distance)	Actual closest approach distance (Lunar distance)	(H) (abs. mag)	Approx. Size (m)
2018 BA_{3}	2021-01-26 ±7 days	Not observed in 2021	0.74–8.2 (0.97 nominal)	Not observed in 2021	26.4	14–31

== Additional examples ==
Confirmed Earth approaches in 2021
Passed within	#
1 LD (384,400 km)	145
5 LD (1,922,000 km)	586
10 LD (3,844,000 km)	1018
0.05 AU (19 LD)	1584
0.1 AU (39 LD)	2312
0.2 AU (78 LD)	3391

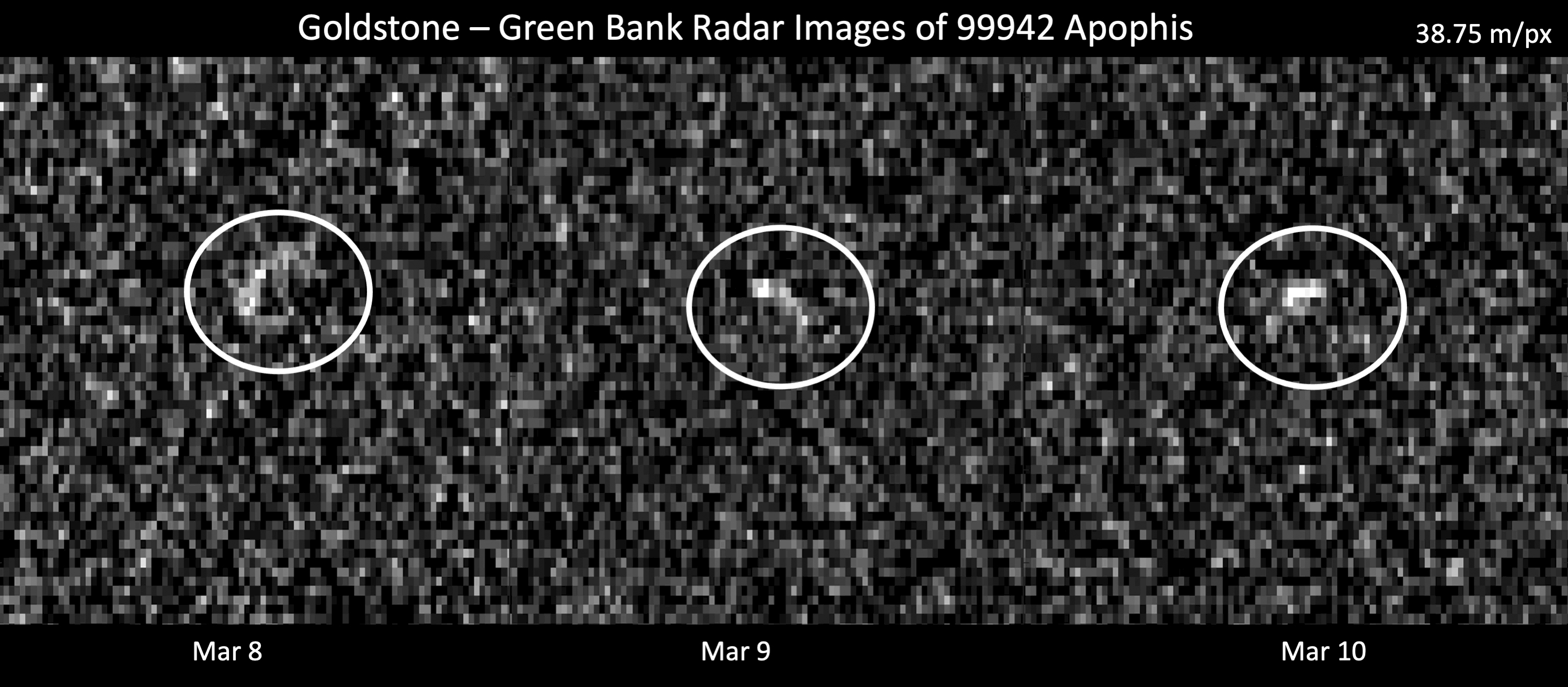
Goldstone radar images of asteroid 99942 Apophis on 8–10 March 2021

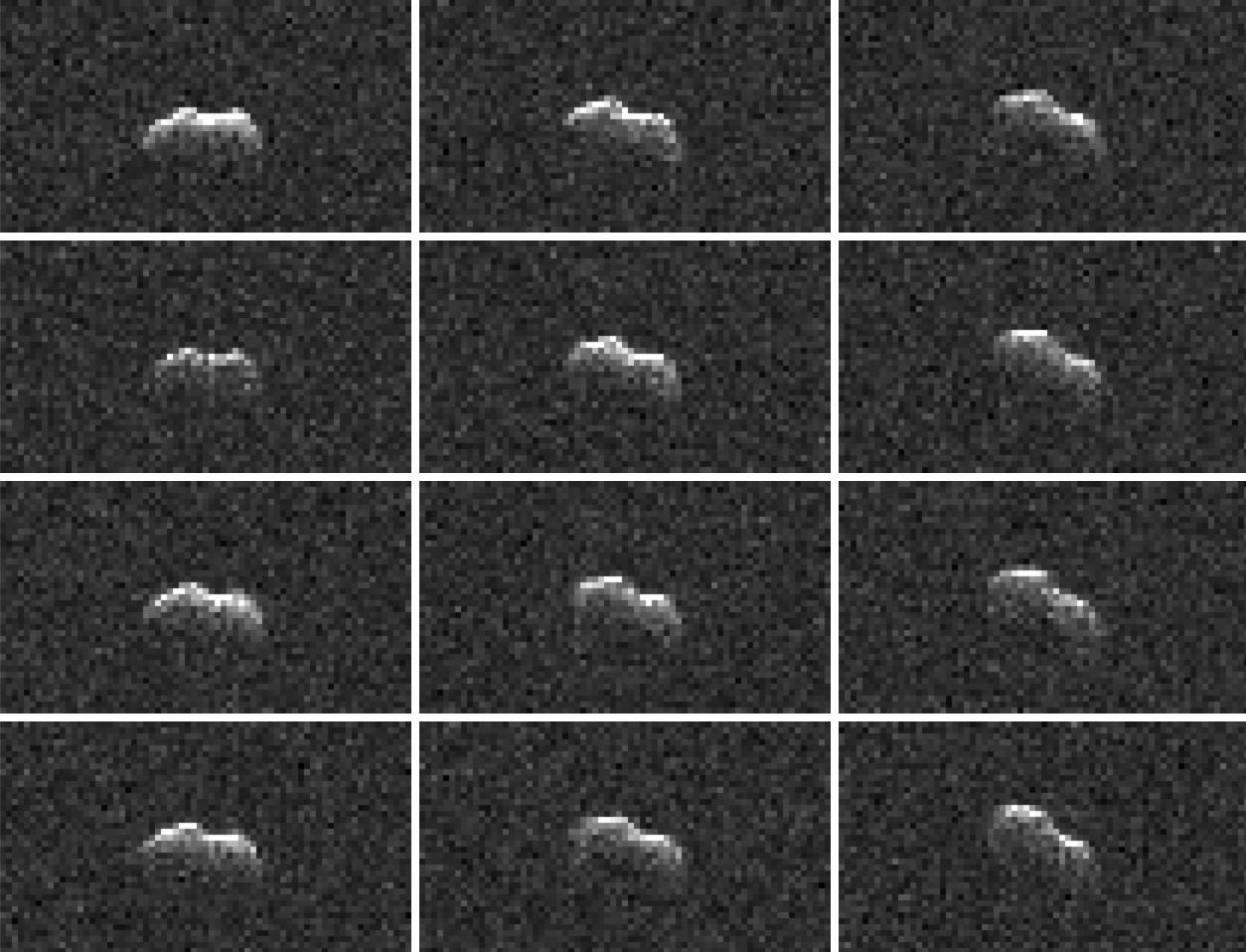
Goldstone radar images of asteroid 2001 FO_{32} during closest approach on 21 March 2021

Below is an example list of near-Earth asteroids that passed or will pass more than 1 lunar distance (384,400 km or 0.00256 AU) from Earth in 2021.

Object	Size (meters)	Nearest approach (lunar distances)	Date	Ref
2018 RB	120-260	18.27	2021-02-07	JPL · CAD
(456537) 2007 BG	330-750	22.35	2021-02-26	JPL · CAD
2016 DV1	29-65	2.1	2021-03-03	JPL · CAD
2021 DW1	30	1.48	2021-03-04	JPL · CAD
99942 Apophis	370	43.85	2021-03-06	JPL · CAD
(231937) 2001 FO32	550	5.25	2021-03-21	JPL · CAD
(441987) 2010 NY_{65}	140-310	15.54	2021-06-25	JPL · CAD
2021 LD_{1}	1,200	11.78	2021-07-09	JPL · CAD
(285571) 2000 PQ_{9}	640-1,400	26.16	2021-07-21	JPL · CAD
2008 GO_{20}	97-220	11.78	2021-07-25	JPL · CAD
2018 LM_{4}	460-1,000	31.85	2021-08-06	JPL · CAD
2016 AJ193	1,374	8.92	2021-08-21	JPL · CAD
2019 XS	48-110	1.49	2021-11-09	JPL · CAD
3361 Orpheus	300	15.01	2021-11-21	JPL · CAD
1994 WR12	130	16.00	2021-11-29	JPL · CAD
4660 Nereus	330	10.23	2021-12-11	JPL · CAD
(163899) 2003 SD220	790	14.12	2021-12-17	JPL · CAD
2018 AH (Note: Short arc object that had not been observed for years and therefore the uncertainty was relatively large.)	80-170	12.18	2021-12-27	JPL · CAD
Planet Venus (Note: For comparison as closest Venus approach is 2022-Jan-08 at 103 LD. (Earth will be at perihelion on 2022-Jan-04.))	—	107.4	2021-12-31	JPL

== See also ==
- List of asteroid close approaches to Earth
- List of asteroid close approaches to Earth in 2020
- List of asteroid close approaches to Earth in 2022
- Asteroid impact prediction
