= (85990) 1999 JV6 =

Asteroid

(85990) 1999 JV_{6}
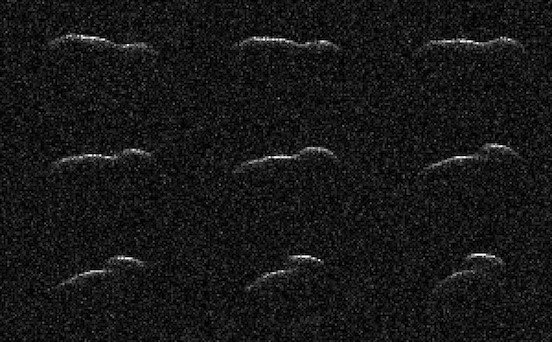
- Radar images of 1999 JV_{6} taken by the Goldstone Radar on 12 January 2015

Discovery
- Discovered by: LINEAR
- Discovery site: Lincoln Lab's ETS
- Discovery date: 13 May 1999

Designations
- Minor planet category: Apollo · NEO · PHA

Orbital characteristics
- Epoch 31 May 2020 (JD 2459000.5)
- Uncertainty parameter 0
- Observation arc: 20.76 yr (7,582 days)
- Aphelion: 1.3219 AU
- Perihelion: 0.6946 AU
- Semi-major axis: 1.0082 AU
- Eccentricity: 0.31110
- Orbital period (sidereal): 1.01 yr
- Mean anomaly: 194.713°
- Mean motion: 0° 58^{m} 24.915^{s} / day
- Inclination: 5.359°
- Longitude of ascending node: 124.318°
- Argument of perihelion: 235.531°
- Earth MOID: 0.03152 AU

Physical characteristics
- Mean diameter: 0.451±0.026 km
- Synodic rotation period: 6.538 h
- Geometric albedo: 0.095±0.023
- Spectral type: Xk (SMASS)
- Absolute magnitude (H): 20.2

(85990) 1999 JV_{6} is a sub-kilometer near-Earth asteroid and a potentially hazardous object of the Apollo group. It was discovered by astronomers of the LINEAR program at the Lincoln Laboratory's Experimental Test Site near Socorro, New Mexico. 1999 JV_{6} is a contact binary object consisting of two distinct lobes, as seen in radar images from various observatories including Arecibo and Goldstone in January 2015.

== Close approaches ==
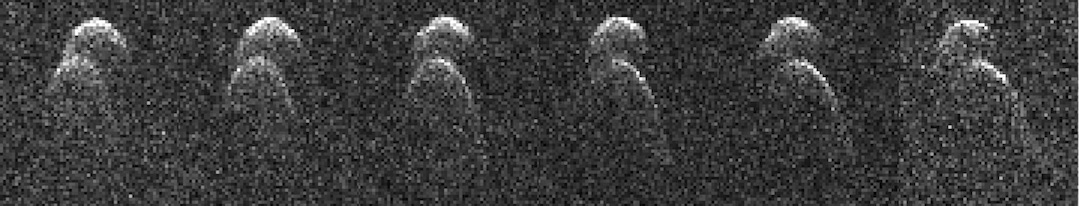
Radar images of 1999 JV_{6} taken by the Goldstone Radar on 9 January 2015

In January 2015, 1999 JV_{6} approached Earth within a distance of 32.4 lunar distances (0.0833 AU). During the encounter, 1999 JV_{6} was observed by radar from the Arecibo, Green Bank, and Goldstone observatories. In January 2016, 1999 JV_{6} has made another close approach at a distance of 12 lunar distances (0.032 AU), several times closer than the encounter in 2015.

The Minor Planet Center has classified 1999 JV_{6} as a potentially hazardous asteroid due to its large size and small Earth minimum orbit intersection distance (MOID) of 0.03 AU.

== Physical characteristics ==
1999 JV_{6} was discovered in May 1999 by the Lincoln Near-Earth Asteroid Research (LINEAR) program at the Lincoln Laboratory's Experimental Test Site near Socorro, New Mexico. Most properties of 1999 JV_{6} have been determined through photometry, spectroscopy, infrared radiometry, and radar imaging.

Binzel et al. (2001) have found that 1999 JV_{6} has a spectral class of an Xk-type asteroid. Thermal infrared observations using the WISE spacecraft by Mainzer et al. (2011) and the Spitzer Space Telescope by Mueller et al. (2011) give a diameter of 0.45 km (0.28 mi). Warner et al. (2014, 2015) suggest that 1999 JV_{6} has a highly elongated shape due to its large light curve amplitude of 0.9 magnitudes. Based on 1999 JV_{6}'s large brightness changes, they measured a rotation period of 6.54 hours. In January 2015, radar imaging by the Arecibo Observatory and the Green Bank Observatory confirmed 1999 JV_{6}'s elongated shape and provided delay-Doppler images used to obtain a preliminary estimate of a 3D model for its shape. The radar data reveal an apparent concavity and suggest that 1999 JV_{6} is a contact binary.
