= 2011 GA =

Near-Earth asteroid

Discovery
- Discovered by: Mount Lemmon Survey
- Discovery site: Catalina Mountains north of Tucson, Arizona, USA
- Discovery date: 1 April 2011

Designations
- Alternative designations: MPO 200327
- Minor planet category: Apollo NEO, PHA, Earth crosser, Mars crosser

Orbital characteristics
- Epoch 21 November 2025 (JD 2461000.5)
- Uncertainty parameter 0
- Observation arc: 12.63 yr (4614 days)
- Aphelion: 2.86328 AU (428.341 Gm)
- Perihelion: 0.73589 AU (110.088 Gm)
- Semi-major axis: 1.79958 AU (269.213 Gm)
- Eccentricity: 0.59108
- Orbital period (sidereal): 2.41 yr (884.44 d)
- Mean anomaly: 332.056°
- Mean motion: 0° 24^{m} 29.768^{s} /day
- Inclination: 9.82630°
- Longitude of ascending node: 200.341°
- Argument of perihelion: 109.694°
- Earth MOID: 0.00711963 AU (1,065,081 km)
- Jupiter MOID: 2.5206 AU (377.08 Gm)

Physical characteristics
- Dimensions: 170–380 m
- Synodic rotation period: 4.4 hours
- Absolute magnitude (H): 20.7

2011 GA is a near-Earth object and Apollo asteroid that passed close to the Earth on 15 October 2023. Due to its size and low MOID, it is classified as a potentially hazardous asteroid (PHA).

== Observations ==
2011 GA was discovered on 1 April 2011 by Andrea Boattinti, who was working for the Mount Lemmon Survey.

In the days just after the close approach, the asteroid was observed by the Goldstone Solar-System Radar.

== Orbit and physical characteristics ==
The orbit and size of 2011 GA makes it a potentially hazardous asteroid (PHA). 2011 GA passed within 0.01743 AU (2,607,000 km; 1,620,000 mi) of the Earth on 15 October 2023. The asteroid also passed within 0.02494 AU (3,731,000 km; 2,318,000 mi) from Earth around 15 October 1977. For comparison, the distance to the Moon is about 0.0026 AU (384,400 km).

2011 GA has a rotation period of about 4.4 hours. Radar images of the asteroid showed a smooth, regular shape.

The Jupiter Tisserand invariant, used to distinguish different kinds of orbits, is 3.826.

== See also ==
- 99942 Apophis
