= 2016 DV1 =

Apollo near-Earth asteroid

2016 DV_{1}
- Bistatic Solar System Radar image of 2016 DV_{1} on 3 March 2016.

Discovery
- Discovered by: MLS
- Discovery site: Mount Lemmon Obs.
- Discovery date: 28 February 2016 (first observation)

Designations
- Minor planet category: NEO–Apollo

Orbital characteristics
- Epoch 17 December 2020 (JD 2459200.5)
- Uncertainty parameter 0
- Observation arc: 5 years
- Aphelion: 3.0020 AU
- Perihelion: 0.68115 AU
- Semi-major axis: 1.8417 AU
- Eccentricity: 0.63015
- Orbital period (sidereal): 2.50 yr (913 d)
- Mean anomaly: 311.68°
- Mean motion: 0° 23^{m} 39.84^{s} / day
- Inclination: 3.3747°
- Longitude of ascending node: 161.69°
- Time of perihelion: 18 April 2021
- Argument of perihelion: 80.068°
- Earth MOID: 0.00099 AU (0.39 LD; 148,000 km)

Physical characteristics
- Mean diameter: 29–65 m (est. 0.25–0.05) (Note: CNEOS lists a generic size range of 29–65 meters (95–210 feet) which would be an average size of 47 meters (150 feet).); 40 m (assumed 0.14)
- Synodic rotation period: 0.084148±0.000005 h (Note: Warner (2016) lightcurve plot of 2016 DV_{1} rotation period 0.084148±0.000005 hours with a brightness amplitude of 0.56±0.04 mag. Quality code: 3. Summary figures at the Center for Solar System Studies and at the LCDB) or 5.04888±0.0003 min
- Absolute magnitude (H): 24.8

2016 DV_{1} is a near-Earth asteroid estimated to be roughly 29–65 meters (95–210 feet) in diameter. It is a fast rotating asteroid of the Apollo group which was first observed by the Mount Lemmon Survey on 28 February 2016, just days before it passed Earth at 1 lunar distance (LD) on 3 March 2016. The elongated fast rotator has a rotation period of 303 seconds. It was recovered in February 2021 as it was about to pass Earth on 3 March 2021 at a distance of 0.0053 AU (2.1 LD; 790,000 km; 490,000 mi).

== Orbit ==
2016 DV_{1} orbits the Sun at a distance of 0.7–3.0 AU once every 2 years and 6 months (913 days; semi-major axis of 1.84 AU). Its orbit has a high eccentricity of 0.63 and an inclination of 3° with respect to the ecliptic. It has an Earth minimum orbital intersection distance of 0.001 AU (0.39 LD; 150,000 km). Due to its eccentric orbit, 2016 DV_{1} is also a Mars-crosser, crossing the orbit of the Red Planet at 1.66 AU.

== 2016 discovery ==
It was first observed by the Mount Lemmon Survey on 28 February 2016, when the asteroid was about 0.04 AU (6,000,000 km; 3,700,000 mi) from Earth and had a solar elongation of 174°. The last optical image was at 3 March 2016 03:08 UT. Bistatic Solar System Radar (GSSR) with DSS-13 and the Green Bank Observatory were used to image the asteroid. It passed closest approach to Earth on 3 March 2016 05:17 UT at a distance of 0.00264 AU (1.03 LD; 395,000 km; 245,000 mi) and was quickly approaching the glare of the Sun thus preventing further optical observations.

== 2021 approach ==
It was recovered on 17 February 2021 by Pan-STARRS when the uncertainty in the asteroid's sky position covered about 1.2° of the sky.

By early February 2021 the asteroid was brighter than apparent magnitude 24, (Note: Do not confuse the fixed value of absolute magnitude (H) with the variable value of apparent magnitude. Absolute magnitude is how bright the object would be if it was both 1 AU from Earth and the Sun, and is useful for estimating the diameter of the object. Apparent magnitude is how bright the object is on a given date/time.) which still placed it near the limiting magnitude of even the best automated astronomical surveys. It came to opposition (opposite the Sun in the sky) around 26 February 2021 at around magnitude 19. On 3 March 2021 it passed 0.0053 AU (2.1 LD; 790,000 km; 490,000 mi) from Earth. It was not listed on the Sentry Risk Table because the line of variation (LOV) did not pass through where Earth will be.

== Physical characteristics ==
=== Rotation period ===
In March 2016, a rotational lightcurve of 2016 DV_{1} was obtained from photometric observations by American astronomer Brian Warner at the Palmer Divide Station (U81) at the Center for Solar System Studies in California. Lightcurve analysis gave a well-defined rotation period of 0.084148±0.000005 hours (or 302.9 seconds) with a high brightness variation of 0.56±0.04 in magnitude, indicative of an irregular shape (U=3). On the following night, European astronomers Siegfried Eggl, William Thuillot, Maria Kudryashova, and Raoul Behrend determined a similar period of 0.08435±0.00005 hours (or 303.7 seconds) and an even higher amplitude of 1.02±0.03 magnitude.(U=3).

=== Diameter ===
The diameter can only be estimated. Based on a generic absolute magnitude-to-diameter conversion, 2016 DV_{1} measures approximately 40 meters (130 feet) in diameter given an absolute magnitude of 24.8 and an assumed albedo of 0.14. Since the near-Earth population shows a bimodal distribution with two albedo-peaks at 0.25 and 0.05, 2016 DV_{1} may measure 29–65 meters (95–210 feet) in diameter, for a corresponding stony and carbonaceous composition, respectively.
