= (163899) 2003 SD220 =

Sub-kilometer asteroid and tumbling slow rotator

(163899) 2003 SD_{220}
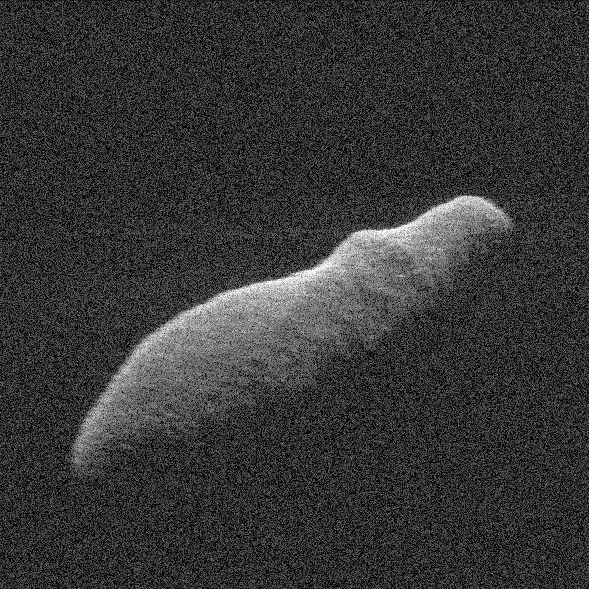
- Radar image of 2003 SD_{220} from Arecibo Observatory on 16 December 2018

Discovery
- Discovered by: LONEOS
- Discovery site: Anderson Mesa Stn.
- Discovery date: 29 September 2003

Designations
- Alternative designations: 2000 AD_{229}
- Minor planet category: NEO · PHA · Aten

Orbital characteristics
- Epoch 4 September 2017 (JD 2458000.5)
- Uncertainty parameter 0
- Observation arc: 15.96 yr (5,828 days)
- Aphelion: 1.0019 AU
- Perihelion: 0.6533 AU
- Semi-major axis: 0.8276 AU
- Eccentricity: 0.2106
- Orbital period (sidereal): 0.75 yr (275 days)
- Mean anomaly: 322.67°
- Mean motion: 1° 18^{m} 33.12^{s} / day
- Inclination: 8.4591°
- Longitude of ascending node: 274.05°
- Argument of perihelion: 326.47°
- Earth MOID: 0.0174 AU · 6.8 LD

Physical characteristics
- Mean diameter: 0.80±0.02 km 1.03 km (calculated)
- Synodic rotation period: 285±5 h (Note: Lightcurve plot of (163899) 2003 SD_{220}, by Brian Warner, Palmer Divide Station, California (2015). Rotation period of 285±5 hours with a brightness amplitude of 2.2±0.1 mag. Quality Code 2+. Summary figures at the LCDB); 11.9±0.2 days
- Geometric albedo: 0.20 (assumed); 0.31±0.04
- Spectral type: S (assumed)
- Apparent magnitude: 13.5 (2021 peak)
- Absolute magnitude (H): 17.3 · 17.36

(163899) 2003 SD_{220} is a sub-kilometer asteroid and tumbling slow rotator, classified as a near-Earth object and potentially hazardous asteroid of the Aten group, which orbit the Sun between Venus and Earth. Its orbital period of 0.75 years means that it orbits the Sun about 4 times for every 3 of the Earth. It was discovered on 29 September 2003, by astronomers of the Lowell Observatory Near-Earth-Object Search at Anderson Mesa Station near Flagstaff, Arizona.

== Earth flybys 2015–2027 ==
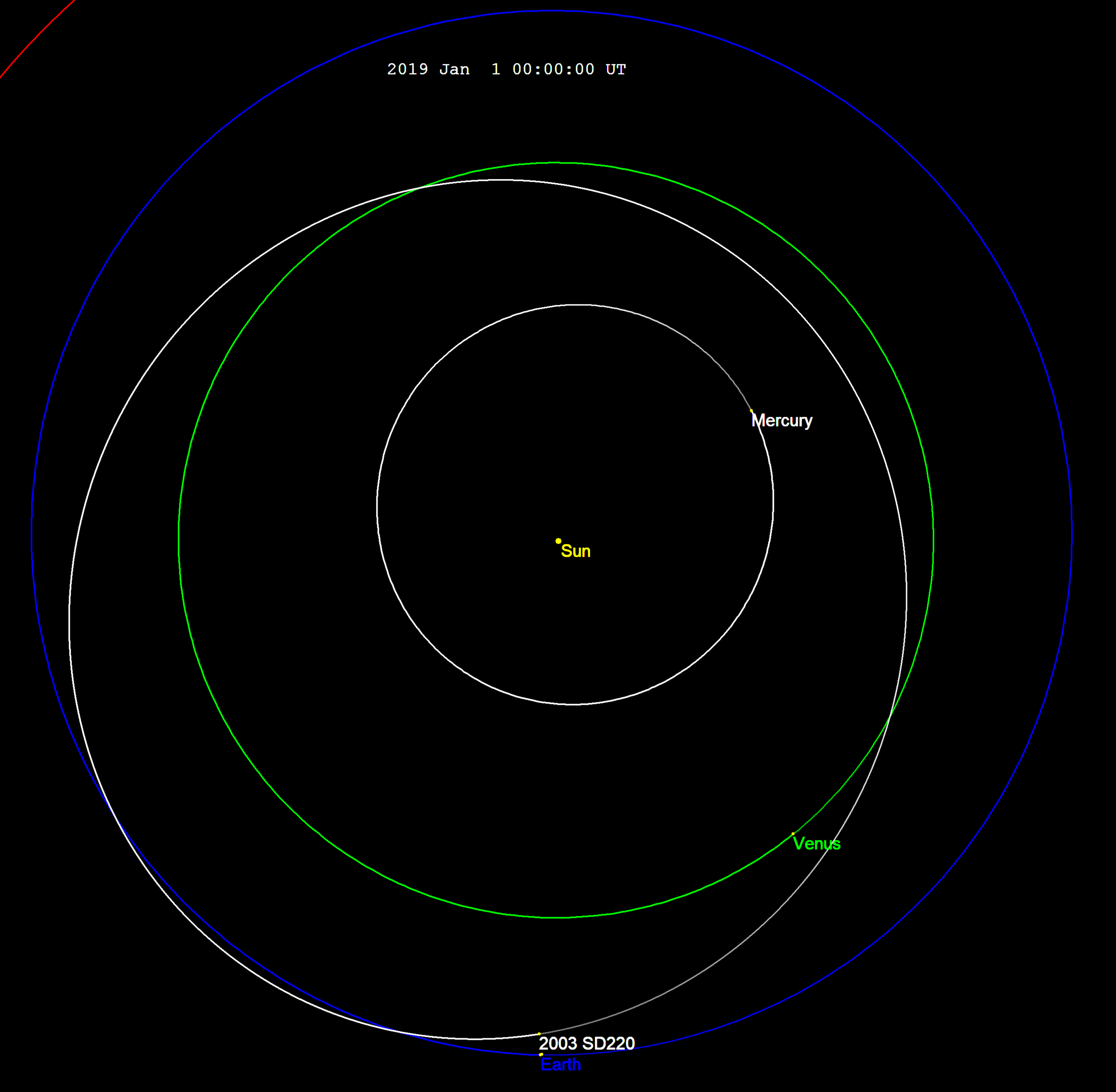
Orbit diagram showing 2003 SD_{220} and the inner Solar System

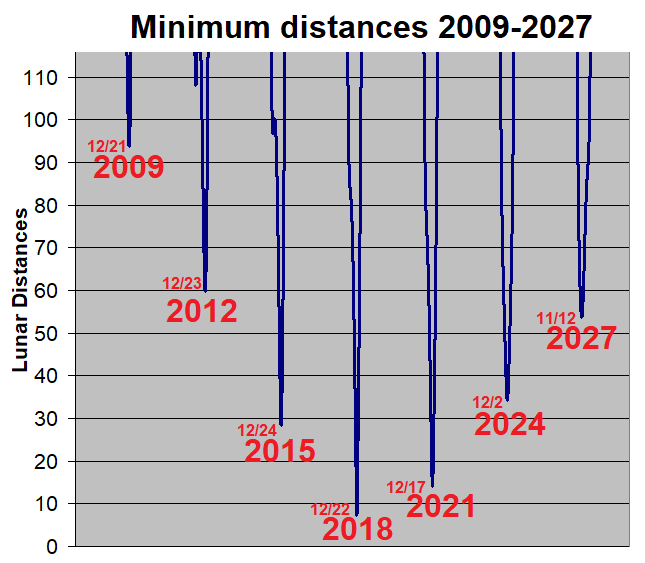
Minimum distances from 2009 to 2027

It passed about 28 lunar distances (LD) from the Earth on 25 December 2015. It came within about 7 LD (0.0189 AU) on 22 December 2018. Its peak brightness was about 13.13 magnitude on 16 December 2018.

Observations are planned for favorable flybys in 2021, 2024, and 2027. It passed with 14 LD (0.0363 AU) on 17 December 2021, and 34 LD (0.0884 AU) on 2 December 2024, and 54 LD (0.1382 AU) on 12 November 2027.

Patrick Taylor of Arecibo Observatory suggested it could be a target for a future robotic mission.

Close approach
Date	JPL SBDB nominal geocentric distance	uncertainty region (3-sigma)
2021-12-17	5427633 km	± 22 km

=== 2015 ===
It was observed in December 2015 at a distance of 28.3 lunar distances (0.07296 AU) on 24 December, and its brightest was 15.22 magnitude on 16 December. It showed an elongated shape, up to 2 km wide, described as being shaped like a sweet potato.

GDSCC		Arecibo Observatory
17 December 2015	22 December 2015	3–16 December 2015

Path of asteroid during December 2015 (3 day motion)
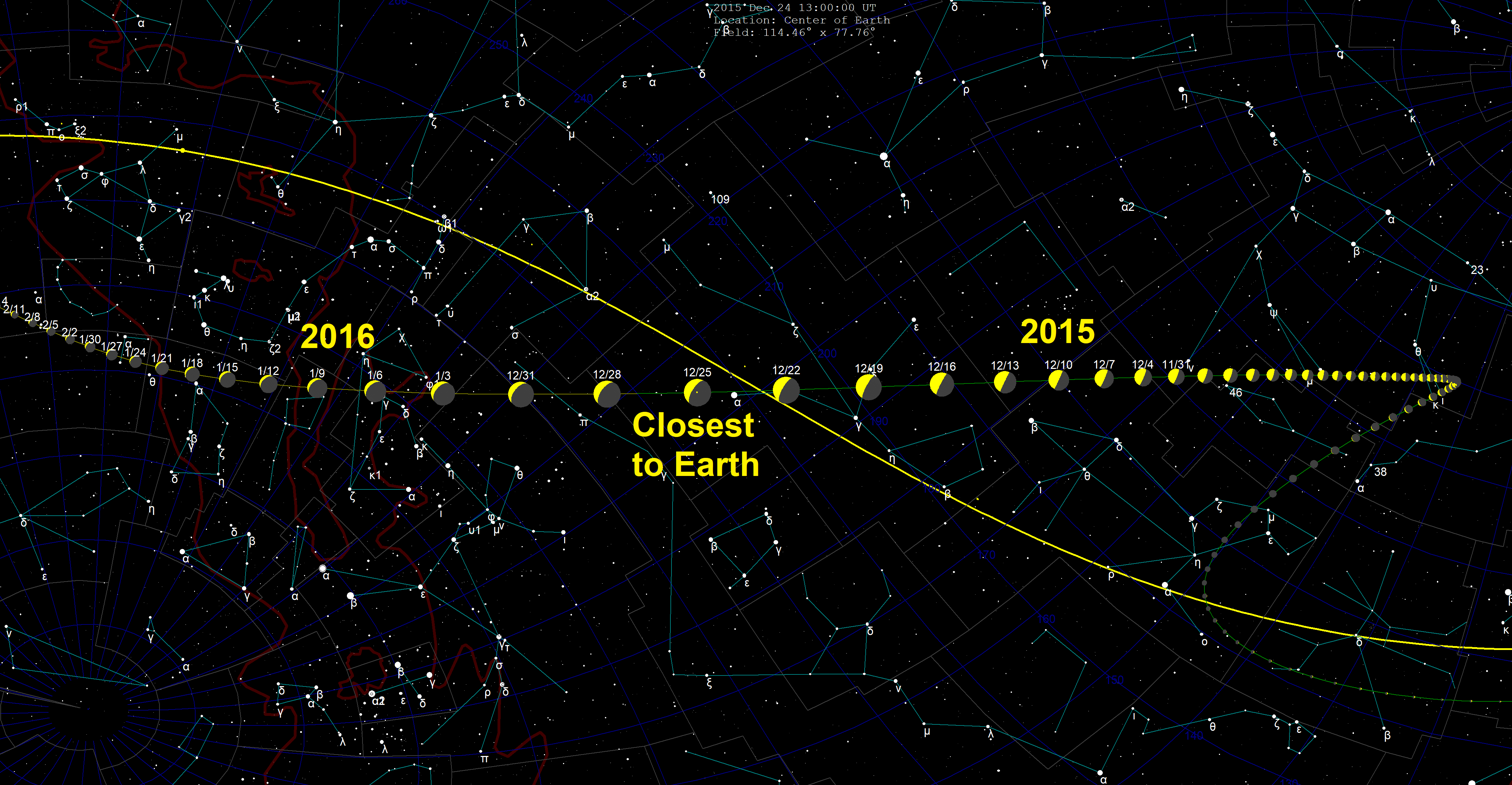

=== Closest flyby 2018 ===
2003 SD_{220} passed its closest distance of 7.34 LD (0.01899 AU) on 22 December 2018. It was on the list of Goldstone targets for December 2018 to gain more information for the Near-Earth Object Human Space Flight Accessible Targets Study (NHATS).

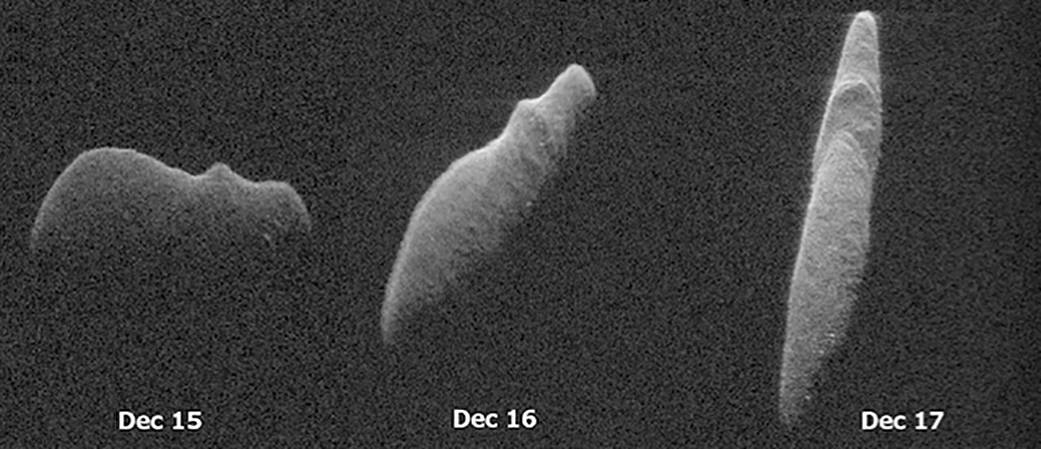
Asteroid 2003 SD_{220} radar images (15–17 December 2018)

Its peak brightness was about 13.1 magnitude on 16 December 2018, moving south from Ursa Major and Boötes into Ophiuchus at closest approach and into Sagittarius.

The daily motion of (163899) 2003 SD_{220} in December 2018
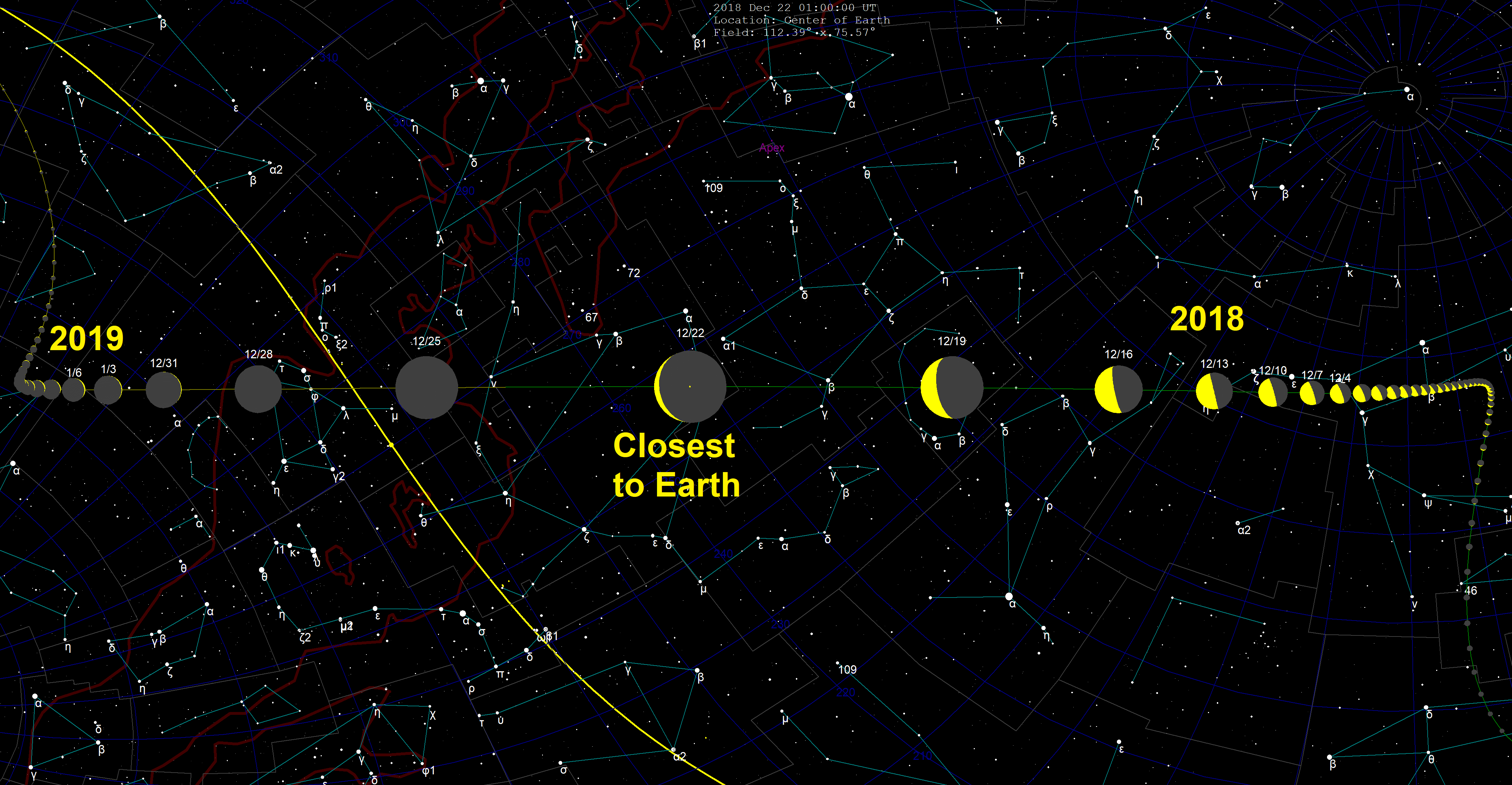

=== 2021 ===
2003 SD_{220} passed at a distance of 14.1 lunar distances (0.03628 AU) on 17 December 2021. It was observed by the Goldstone Solar System Radar from November to December 2021.

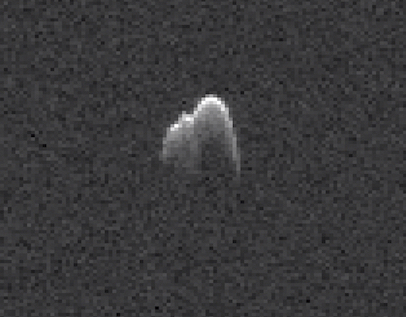
22 November 2021

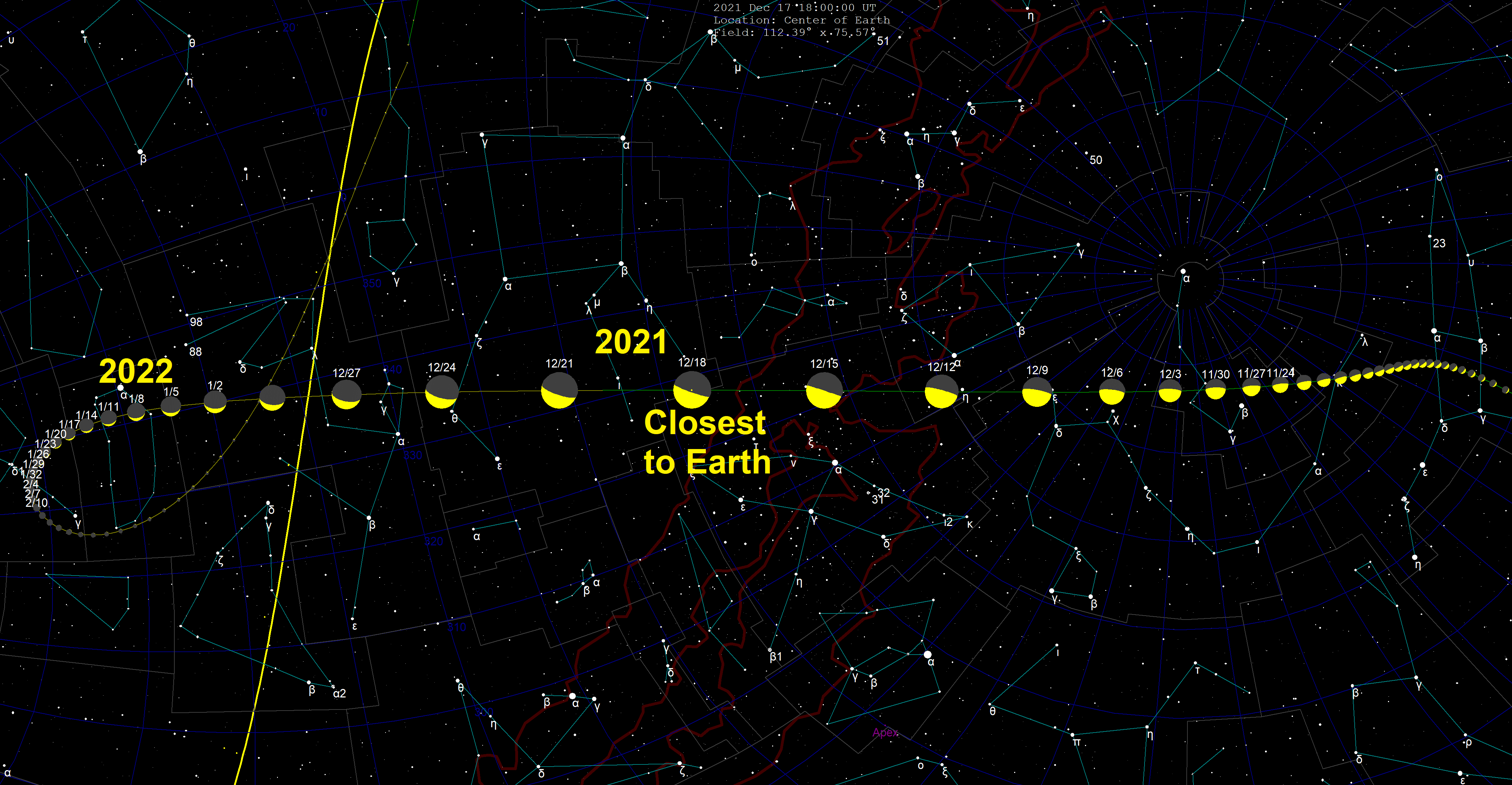
