= (231937) 2001 FO32 =

Asteroid

(231937) 2001 FO_{32}
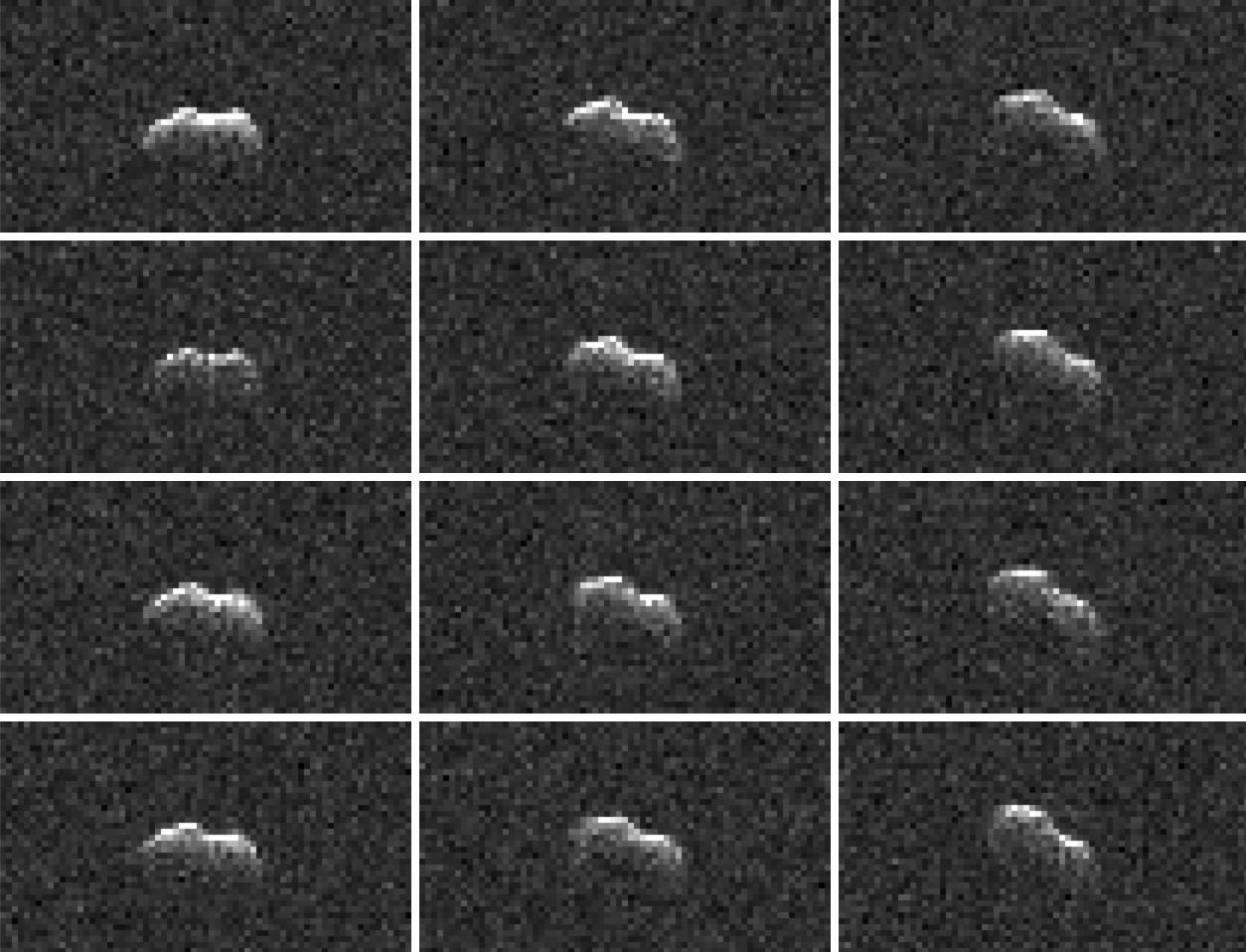
- Radar images of 2001 FO_{32} from Goldstone on 22 March 2021

Discovery
- Discovered by: LINEAR
- Discovery site: Lincoln Lab ETS
- Discovery date: 23 March 2001

Designations
- Minor planet category: NEO · Apollo · PHA

Orbital characteristics
- Epoch 17 December 2020 (JD 2459200.5)
- Uncertainty parameter 0
- Observation arc: 20.00 yr (7,304 days)
- Aphelion: 3.106 AU
- Perihelion: 0.2958 AU
- Semi-major axis: 1.701 AU
- Eccentricity: 0.82613
- Orbital period (sidereal): 2.22 yr
- Mean anomaly: 299.160°
- Mean motion: 0° 26^{m} 39.193^{s} / day
- Inclination: 38.982°
- Longitude of ascending node: 181.732°
- Time of perihelion: 2 May 2021 23:01 UT
- Argument of perihelion: 123.314°
- Earth MOID: 0.00375 AU (561,000 km)
- Mercury MOID: 0.03566 AU (5,335,000 km)
- Venus MOID: 0.07461 AU (11,161,000 km)

Physical characteristics
- Mean diameter: 550±110 m
- Synodic rotation period: 39.89±0.05 hr
- Spectral type: Sr
- Apparent magnitude: 15.0 (current)
- Absolute magnitude (H): 17.7

(231937) 2001 FO_{32} is a near-Earth asteroid classified as a potentially hazardous asteroid of the Apollo group. With an estimated diameter around 550 m (1,800 ft), it was discovered by the Lincoln Near-Earth Asteroid Research at Socorro, New Mexico on 23 March 2001. The asteroid safely passed by Earth on 21 March 2021 16:03 UTC from a closest approach distance of 0.0135 AU (2.02 million km; 1.25 million mi), or 5.25 lunar distances (LD). During the day before closest approach, 2001 FO_{32} reached a peak apparent magnitude of 11.7 and was visible to ground-based observers with telescope apertures of at least 20 cm (8 in). It is the largest and one of the fastest asteroids to approach Earth within 10 LD (3.8 million km; 2.4 million mi) in 2021.

With an observation arc of 20 years, 2001 FO_{32} has a well-determined orbit, and its trajectory is well known through the year 2196. The asteroid's orbit is only potentially hazardous on a time scale of thousands of years.

== Discovery ==
2001 FO_{32} was discovered on 23 March 2001 by the Lincoln Near-Earth Asteroid Research (LINEAR) at Lincoln Laboratory's Experimental Test Site in Socorro, New Mexico. The asteroid was first observed in the constellation Hydra at an apparent magnitude of 15.6. Shortly after discovery, follow-up observations were carried out by four other observatories until the asteroid's subsequent confirmation by the Minor Planet Center on 24 March 2003. The asteroid was given the provisional designation 2001 FO_{32} and was recognized as a potentially hazardous asteroid. The accredited LINEAR observers are M. Blythe, F. Shelly, M. Bezpalko, R. Huber, L. Manguso, and S. Adams.

== Orbit and classification ==
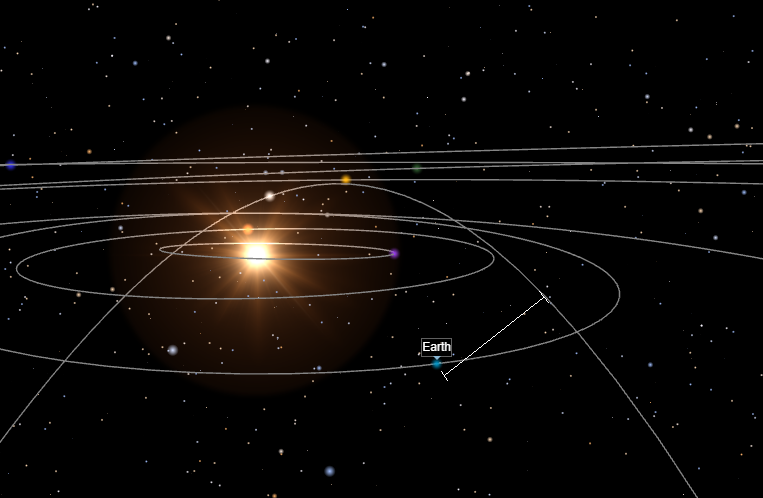
Orbit diagram illustrating 2001 FO_{32}'s close approach to Earth in 2021

2001 FO_{32} is a member of the dynamical Apollo group of Earth-crossing near-Earth asteroids with orbital semi-major axes greater than 1 astronomical unit (AU). It follows a highly elongated orbit around the Sun at a distance of 0.3–3.1 AU once every 2.22 years (810 days; semi-major axis of 1.7 AU). Its orbit has a high eccentricity of 0.83 and an inclination of 39° with respect to the ecliptic. With its highly eccentric orbit, it crosses the orbits of all four inner planets of the Solar System.

Having a long observation arc nearly 20 years, the orbit of 2001 FO_{32} is well-defined with a condition code of 0. Although it is classified as a potentially hazardous asteroid due to its large size combined with its small minimum orbit intersection distance (MOID) of 0.00375 AU (1.46 lunar distances) from Earth's orbital path, the asteroid will not make any close approaches within 0.01 AU (3.9 LD) over the next 200 years. The asteroid's orbit is only potentially hazardous on a time scale of thousands of years.

=== Close approaches ===
Over the course of its highly eccentric orbit, 2001 FO_{32} makes numerous close encounters with the inner planets—most often Mercury, Venus, and Earth. Its MOIDs from Mercury and Venus are 0.036 AU (5.4 million km; 3.3 million mi) and 0.075 AU (11.2 million km; 7.0 million mi), respectively. 2001 FO_{32}'s most recent close encounter with either one of those planets was on 16 January 2008, when it passed by Mercury from a distance of 0.094 AU (14.1 million km; 8.7 million mi).

On 21 March 2021, 2001 FO_{32} passed by Earth from a distance of 0.0135 AU (2.02 million km; 1.25 million mi) or 5.25 LD and made its closest approach at 16:03 UTC. During the few days leading up to closest approach, 2001 FO_{32} steadily became brighter and peaked at apparent magnitude 11.7 on 21 March 2021 2:00 UTC. Although its maximum brightness was too faint to be seen with the naked eye, it was visible to observers using telescopes with apertures of at least 20 cm (8 in). Due to its highly inclined and eccentric orbit, its relative velocity to Earth during the close approach is 34.4 km/s (21.4 mi/s), making it one of the fastest asteroids to pass by Earth in 2021. By the time 2001 FO_{32} makes its closest approach to Earth, its solar elongation (angular separation from the Sun) would be 64°, too small to be observable from Earth.

In the next 100 years, 2001 FO_{32} will not make any close approaches to Earth closer than the 21 March 2021 encounter. It will make a similarly close approach to Earth on 22 March 2052 18:57±00:03 UTC, from a slightly farther nominal distance of 0.0189 AU (2.83 million km; 1.76 million mi) or 7.37 LD.

== Observations ==
Preliminary observations by NEOWISE show that 2001 FO_{32} appears to be faint in infrared wavelengths of light, indicating that the asteroid is likely less than 1 kilometer in diameter. Based on this, the diameter is estimated around 550 ± 110 m (1,800 ± 360 ft). Near-infrared spectral data obtained by NASA's Infrared Telescope Facility in 2018 suggests that 2001 FO_{32} is a stony asteroid classified under the Sr spectral class.

2001 FO_{32} was first observed with radar on 21 March 2021 at Canberra, Australia and Narrabri, New South Wales, which provided refinement of its orbit. One day after its closest approach, bistatic radar observations were carried out by NASA's Goldstone Deep Space Communications Complex in California and Green Bank Telescope in West Virginia. The radar images revealed that the asteroid has a bilobate shape.

February 2021 observations of 2001 FO_{32} by the La Silla Observatory show that it displays a light curve amplitude of 0.9 magnitudes. The preliminary photometry indicates that the body is tumbling with a long main rotation period of 39.89±0.05 hours.
