= (679648) 2019 XS =

Asteroid

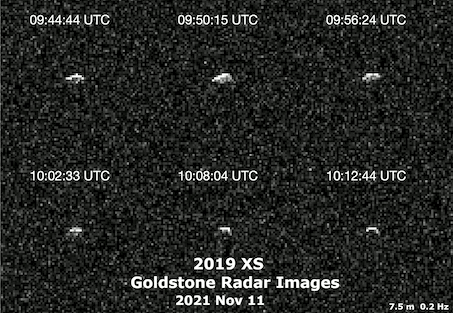
- Goldstone radar images of 2019 XS taken on 11 November 2021

Discovery
- Discovered by: MLS
- Discovery site: Mt. Lemmon Obs.
- Discovery date: 2 December 2019

Designations
- Alternative designations: C1HDFQ2
- Minor planet category: NEO · Apollo

Orbital characteristics
- Epoch 21 January 2022 (JD 2459600.5)
- Uncertainty parameter 0
- Observation arc: 21.68 yr (7,919 days)
- Earliest precovery date: 4 April 2000
- Aphelion: 1.332 AU
- Perihelion: 0.6766 AU
- Semi-major axis: 1.005 AU
- Eccentricity: 0.3264
- Orbital period (sidereal): 1.01 yr (367.74 days)
- Mean anomaly: 140.339°
- Mean motion: 0° 58^{m} 44.218^{s} / day
- Inclination: 4.447°
- Longitude of ascending node: 49.483°
- Argument of perihelion: 250.285°
- Earth MOID: 0.004003 AU (598,800 km)

Physical characteristics
- Mean diameter: ~70 m
- Synodic rotation period: 2.35±0.01 h 3.01±0.01 h
- Absolute magnitude (H): 23.96±0.33; 23.87

(679648) 2019 XS is a small Apollo near-Earth asteroid discovered on 2 December 2019 by the Mount Lemmon Survey in Arizona, United States. It passed 1.493 lunar distances (574,000 km; 357,000 mi) from Earth on 9 November 2021 at 03:48 UTC, after which observations were checked by the International Asteroid Warning Network for timing and astrometric accuracy. During the close pass, the asteroid trailed across the far Southern Hemisphere to the Northern Hemisphere and reached a peak apparent magnitude of 13. A total of 957 observations were collected by Minor Planet Center as part of the International Asteroid Warning Network's campaign.

2019 XS is well-observed with a long observation arc of over 21 years, enough to distinguish subtle changes in its orbit over time due non-gravitational acceleration by the Yarkovsky effect. Highly precise radar observations by NASA's Goldstone Solar System Radar on 11 November 2021 have significantly constrained the asteroid's orbit and 2021 close approach distance to within a few kilometres. Radar imaging has shown that the asteroid is roughly 70 m (230 ft) in diameter, with a rotation period around 3 hours.

Continuous photometric observations by the Center for Solar System Studies in Landers, California show an irregular light curve for 2019 XS, signifying that the asteroid is in a tumbling rotation state. The light curve of 2019 XS appears to display two overlapping periods of 2.35 and 3.01 hours, which could possibly be associated with the asteroid's rotation and precession.

== See also ==
- 2012 TC4, another near-Earth asteroid with a dedicated IAWN timing campaign
