= (620094) 2016 AJ193 =

Near-Earth asteroid

(620094) 2016 AJ_{193}
- Doppler-delay radar images of 2016 AJ_{193} from the Goldstone Radar on 22 August 2021

Discovery
- Discovered by: WISE
- Discovery site: Low Earth orbit
- Discovery date: 17 May 2010 (first observation only)

Designations
- Alternative designations: 2010 KV_{134}
- Minor planet category: NEO · Apollo · PHA

Orbital characteristics
- Epoch 1 July 2020 (JD 2459396.5)
- Uncertainty parameter 0
- Observation arc: 11.51 yr (4,204 days)
- Earliest precovery date: 16 February 2010
- Aphelion: 5.931 AU
- Perihelion: 0.5999 AU
- Semi-major axis: 3.265 AU
- Eccentricity: 0.8163
- Orbital period (sidereal): 5.90 yr (2,155 days)
- Mean anomaly: 344.173°
- Mean motion: 0° 10^{m} 1.359^{s} / day
- Inclination: 22.570°
- Longitude of ascending node: 331.285°
- Argument of perihelion: 81.996°
- Earth MOID: 0.01553 AU (2,323,000 km)

Physical characteristics
- Mean diameter: 1.374±0.403 km
- Synodic rotation period: 3.508±0.001 h
- Geometric albedo: 0.031±0.031
- Absolute magnitude (H): 18.99

(620094) 2016 AJ_{193} (originally known as 2010 KV_{134}) is a near-Earth object and potentially hazardous asteroid of the Apollo group, approximately 1.4 kilometres (0.87 mi) in diameter. It was discovered on 17 May 2010 by the Wide-field Infrared Survey Explorer (WISE) satellite, but was lost until it was reobserved on 16 January 2016. With an observation arc over 11 years, 2016 AJ_{193} has a well-determined orbit and trajectory through the year 2086. The asteroid's orbit is only potentially hazardous on a time scale of thousands of years.

On 21 August 2021, the asteroid safely made a close approach to Earth from a distance of 0.0229 AU (3.43 million km; 2.13 million mi), or 8.92 lunar distances (LD). During closest approach, 2016 AJ_{193} reached a peak apparent magnitude of 14, visible to ground-based observers with telescope apertures of at least 20 cm (8 in). It is the largest asteroid that approached within 10 LD (3.8 million km; 2.4 million mi) of Earth in 2021.

The asteroid received the permanent minor planet number 620094 by the Minor Planet Center on 7 April 2023.

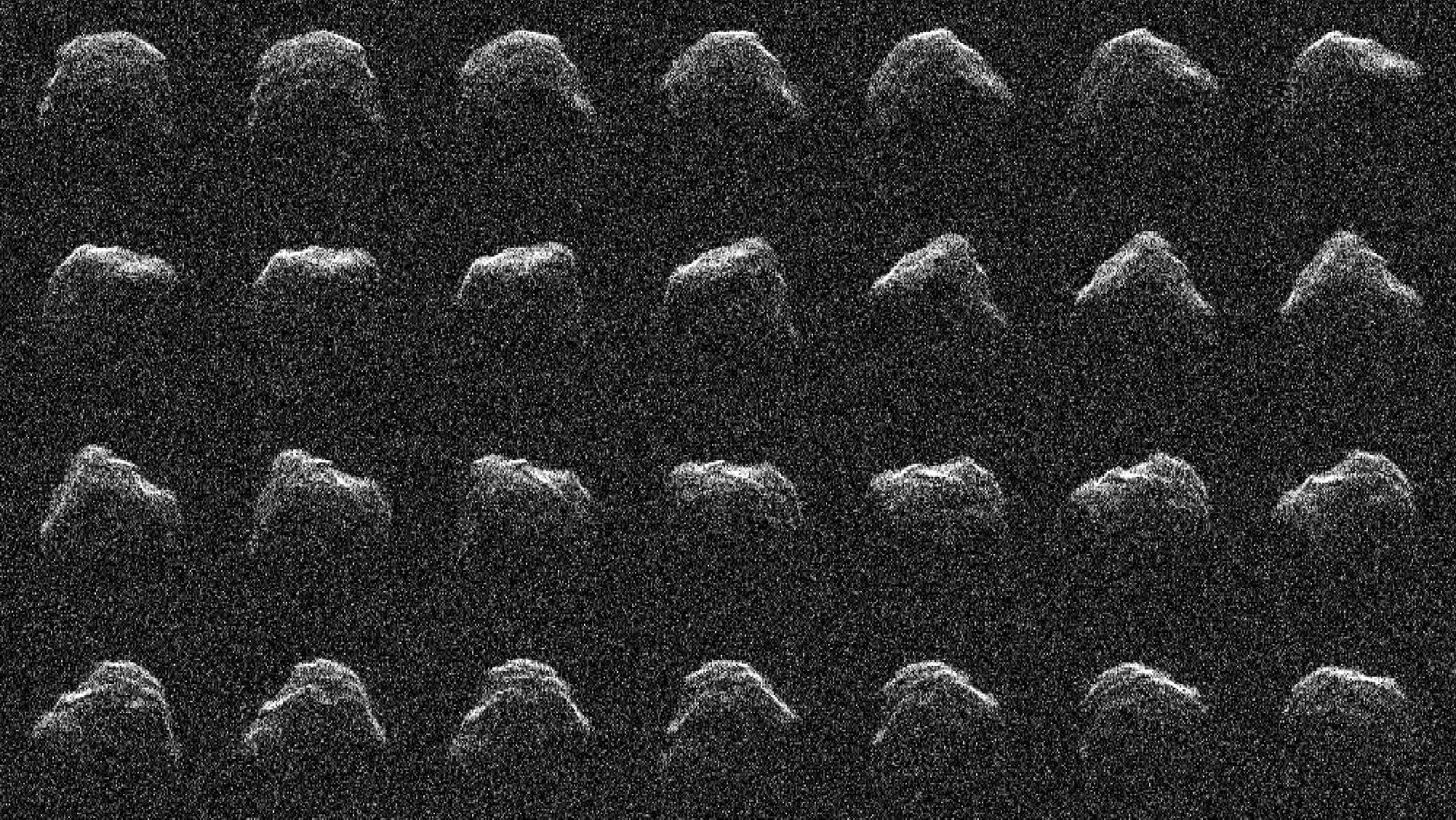
2016 AJ_{193}'s rotation shown in radar images taken by Goldstone on 22 August 2021
