= 2021 DW1 =

Asteroid

2021 DW_{1}
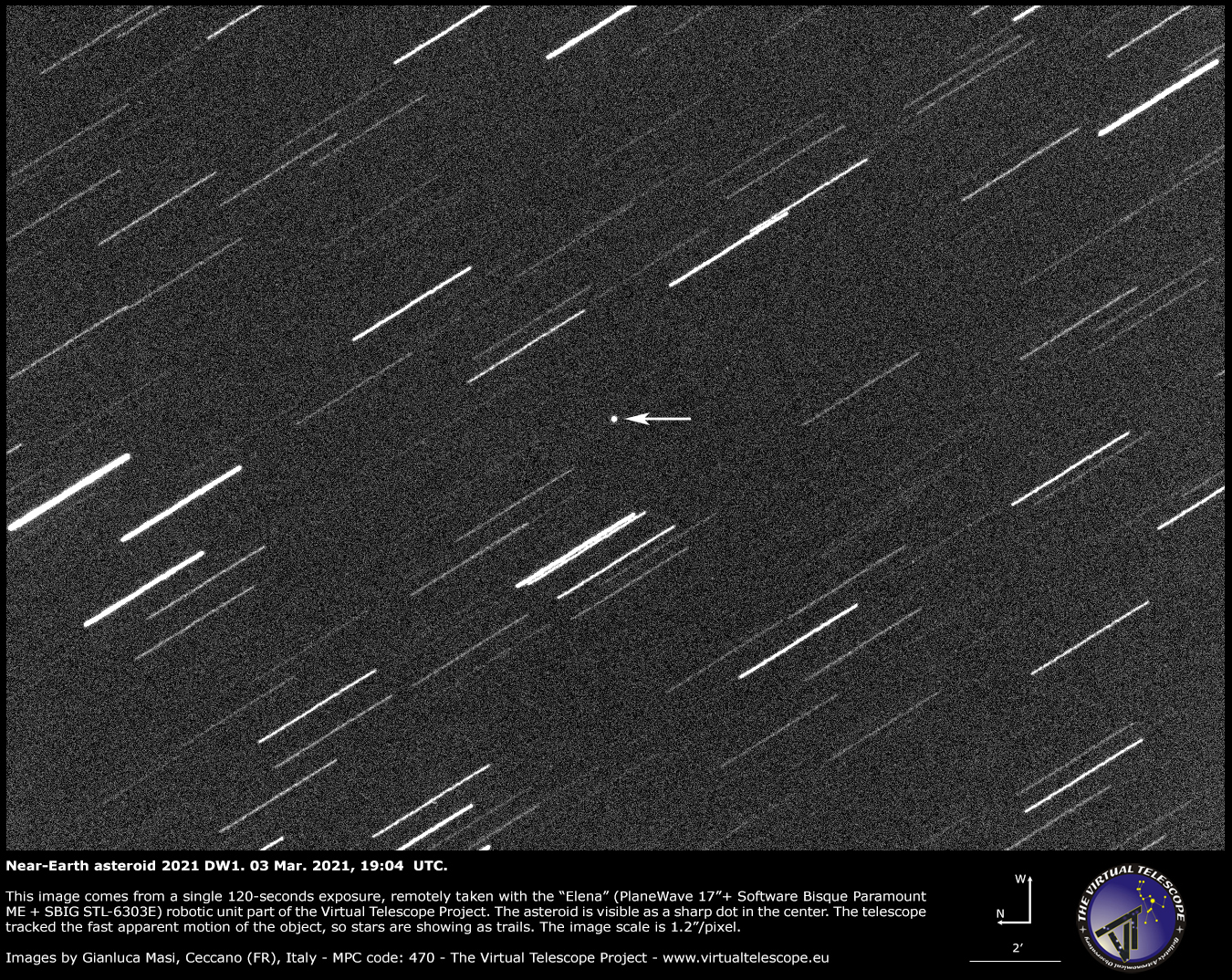
- An image taken of 2021 DW_{1} on the 3rd of March, 2021

Discovery
- Discovered by: Pan-STARRS 1
- Discovery site: Haleakala Obs.
- Discovery date: 16 February 2021

Designations
- Alternative designations: P11dqY3
- Minor planet category: NEO · Apollo

Orbital characteristics
- Epoch 1 July 2020 (JD 2459396.5)
- Uncertainty parameter 4
- Observation arc: 27 days
- Aphelion: 1.662 AU
- Perihelion: 0.9918 AU
- Semi-major axis: 1.327 AU
- Eccentricity: 0.2525
- Orbital period (sidereal): 1.53 yr (558.29 days)
- Mean anomaly: 71.096°
- Mean motion: 0° 38^{m} 41.367^{s} / day
- Inclination: 6.878°
- Longitude of ascending node: 162.489°
- Argument of perihelion: 10.499°
- Earth MOID: 0.00414 AU (619,000 km)

Physical characteristics
- Mean diameter: 30±10 m
- Synodic rotation period: 0.013760±0.000001 h 49.536±0.004 s
- Axial tilt: 54°±10° or 123°±10° (to orbit)
- Pole ecliptic longitude: 57°±10° or 67°±10°
- Pole ecliptic latitude: 29°±10° or −40°±10°
- Geometric albedo: 0.23±0.02
- Spectral type: Sq g–i=0.79±0.01 i–z=0.01±0.02 z–g=0.01±0.02
- Apparent magnitude: 21.0 (discovery); 14.6 (max)
- Absolute magnitude (H): 24.8±0.5 · 25.02±0.27

2021 DW_{1} is a small Apollo near-Earth asteroid discovered on 16 February 2021 by the Pan-STARRS 1 survey at Haleakala Observatory, Hawaii. On 4 March 2021 at 8:59 UTC, it passed 1.48 LD (570,000 km; 350,000 mi) from Earth. During the close approach, it trailed across the Northern Hemisphere sky and brightened up to apparent magnitude of 14.6. Extensive observations of 2021 DW_{1} during the encounter revealed that it is an elongated, stony asteroid approximately 30 metres (100 ft) in diameter, with a rapid rotation period of 50 seconds. The asteroid's spin axis is unusually oblique relative to its orbital plane, contrary to predictions from the YORP effect.

A lightcurve study made by the Harvard University, shows that 2021 DW_{1} may be a contact binary.
