= 2021 GW4 =

Apollo near-Earth asteroid

2021 GW_{4}
Discovery
- Discovered by: MLS
- Discovery site: Mount Lemmon Obs.
- Discovery date: 8 April 2021

Designations
- Minor planet category: NEO–Apollo

Orbital characteristics
- Epoch 2020-Dec-17 (JD 2459200.5)
- Uncertainty parameter 6
- Observation arc: 4 days
- Aphelion: 2.045 AU (305,900,000 km) (Q)
- Perihelion: 0.97725 AU (146,195,000 km) (q)
- Semi-major axis: 1.511 AU (226,000,000 km) (a)
- Eccentricity: 0.3532 (e)
- Orbital period (sidereal): 1.862 yr (678 days)
- Mean anomaly: 286.5° (M)
- Inclination: 0.73712° (i)
- Longitude of ascending node: 201.52° (Ω)
- Time of perihelion: 6 May 2021
- Argument of perihelion: 26.568° (ω)
- Earth MOID: 0.00012 AU (18,000 km; 0.047 LD)
- Jupiter MOID: 2.9 AU (430,000,000 km)

Physical characteristics
- Mean diameter: 3–8 meters (CNEOS)
- Absolute magnitude (H): 29.5

2021 GW_{4} is an Apollo near-Earth object roughly 5 meters (20 feet) in diameter. It was discovered by the Mount Lemmon Survey on 8 April 2021. On 12 April 2021 13:01 UTC it passed 19821 km from the surface of Earth. The uncertainty in the close approach distance was ±30 km.

The Earth approach caused the asteroid to migrate inward and reduced the orbital period by roughly 71 days (from 678 days to 607 days). As a result of the orbit change, it came to its next perihelion (closest approach to the Sun) on 6 May 2021.

Meteor scientist Peter Brown and astronomers Jonathan McDowell and Michael Busch agree that the fireball near South Florida at 13 April 2021 2:16 UTC was unrelated to 2021 GW_{4}. The unrelated fireball became visible at 100 kilometers (62 mi) above sea level and airburst at 37 kilometers (23 mi) before entering dark flight and landing in the Atlantic ocean. Thousands of fireballs occur every day.
