= Goldstone Deep Space Communications Complex =

US observatory near Barstow, California

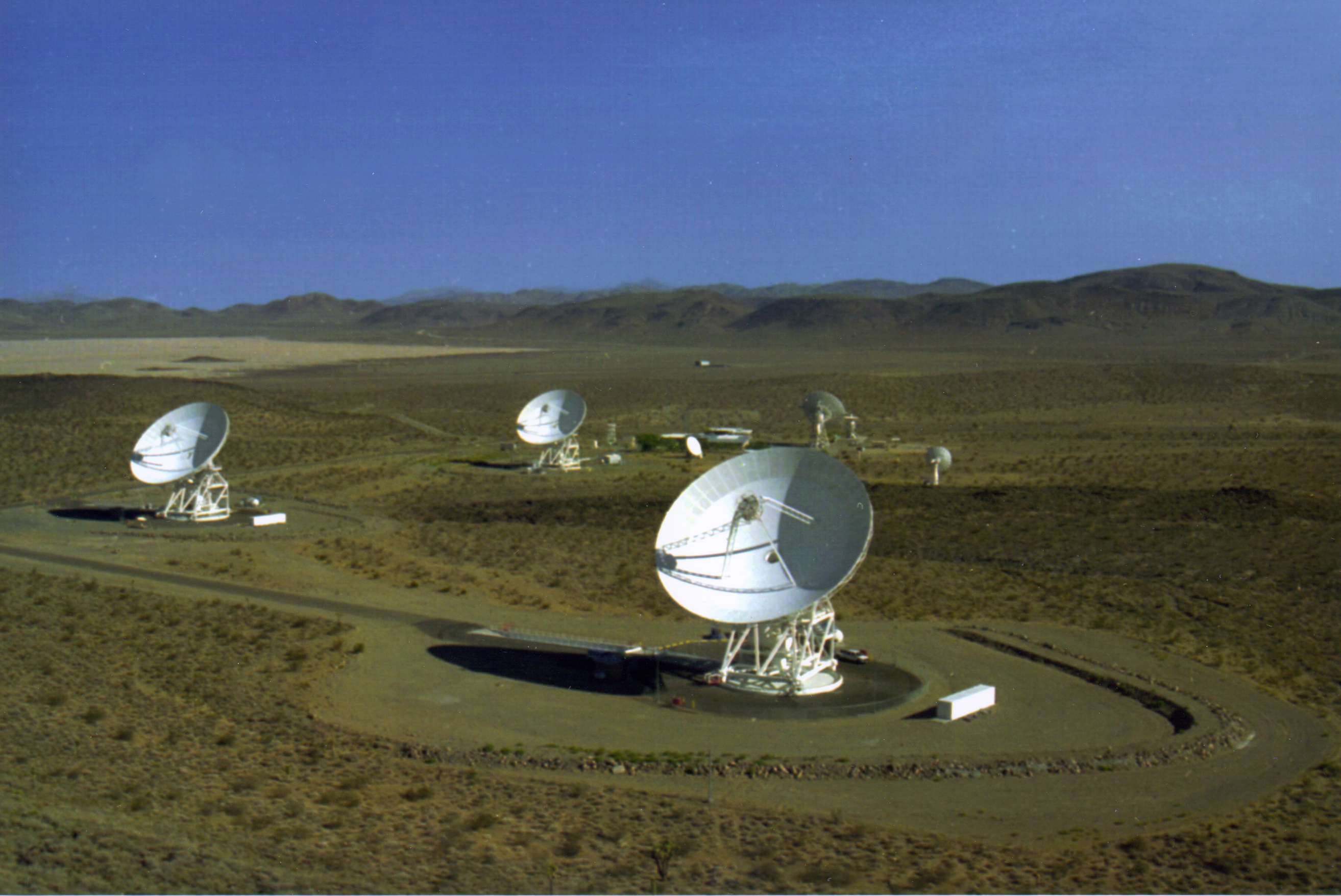
- The 34m antennas at Goldstone
- Alternative names: Goldstone Observatory
- Organization: Jet Propulsion Laboratory
- Location: Fort Irwin, California, California
- Coordinates: 35°25′36″N 116°53′24″W
- Altitude: 2,950 ft (900 m)
- Established: 1958
- Website: www.gdscc.nasa.gov
- Telescopes: DSS 14; DSS 23; DSS 24; DSS 25; DSS 26
- Related media on Commons
- Pioneer Deep Space Station
- U.S. National Register of Historic Places
- U.S. National Historic Landmark
- Location within California
- Location: Goldstone Deep Space Communications Complex, Fort Irwin, California, United States
- Coordinates: 35°23′21.41″N 116°51′22.31″W
- Area: 32,411 Acres
- Built: 1958
- Architect: U.S. Army
- NRHP reference No.: 85002813

Significant dates
- Added to NRHP: October 3, 1985
- Designated NHL: October 3, 1985

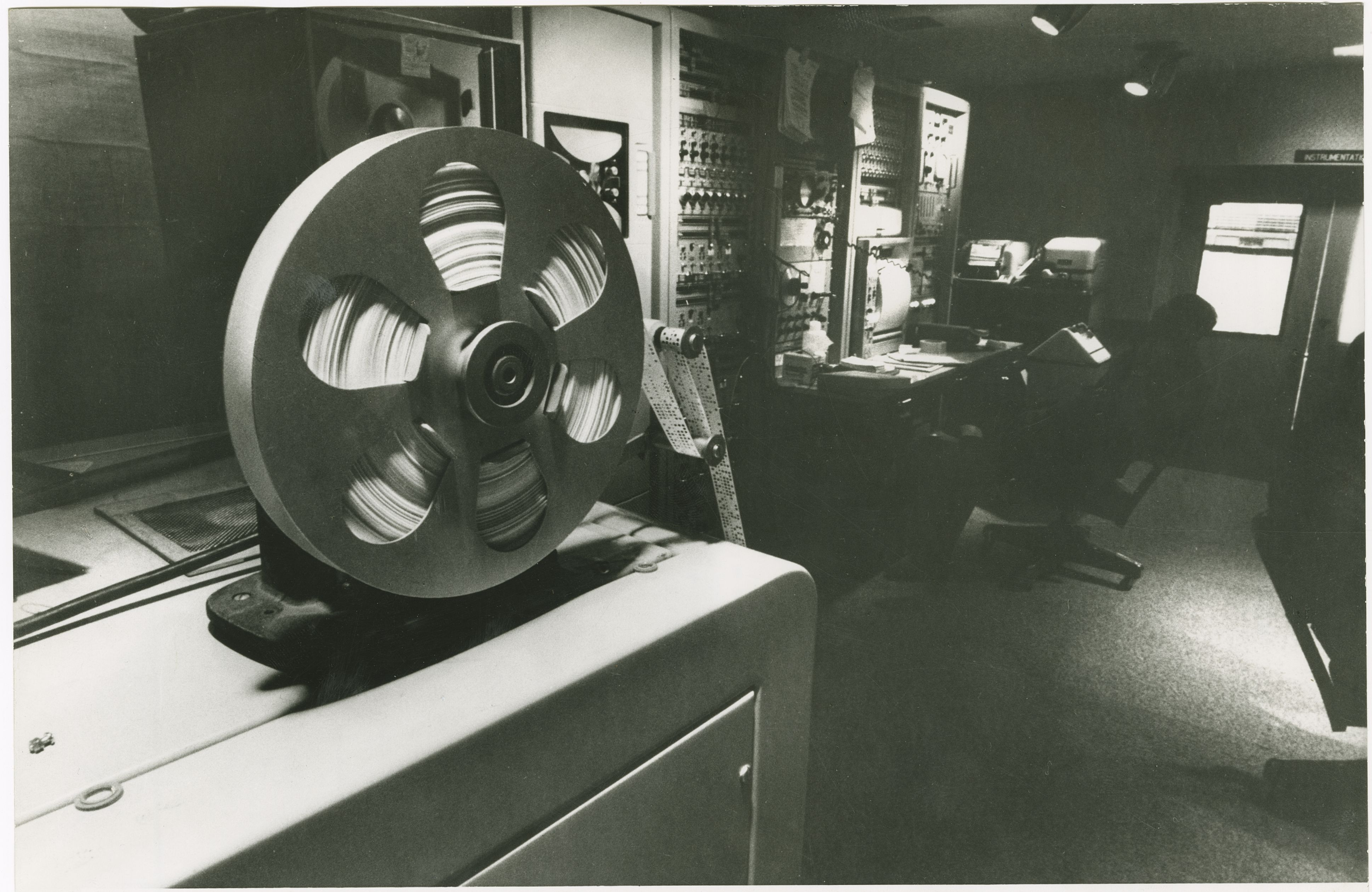
Goldstone Observatory in 1963

The Goldstone Deep Space Communications Complex (GDSCC), commonly called the Goldstone Observatory, is a satellite ground station located in Fort Irwin in the U.S. state of California. Operated by NASA's Jet Propulsion Laboratory (JPL), its main purpose is to track and communicate with interplanetary space missions. It is named after Goldstone, California, a nearby gold-mining ghost town.

The station is one of three satellite communication stations in the NASA Space Communications and Navigation (SCaN) program’s Deep Space Network (DSN), whose mission is to provide the vital two-way communications link that tracks and controls interplanetary spacecraft and receives the images and scientific information they collect. The others are the Madrid Deep Space Communications Complex in Spain and the Canberra Deep Space Communication Complex in Australia. These three stations are located at separations of approximately 120° longitude so that as the Earth rotates a spacecraft will always be in sight of at least one station.

The complex includes the Pioneer Deep Space Station (aka DSS 11), which is a U.S. National Historic Landmark.

== Antennas ==
Five large parabolic (dish) antennas are located at the Goldstone site to handle the workload, since at any given time the DSN is responsible for maintaining communication with up to 30 spacecraft. The antennas function similarly to a home satellite dish. However, since the spacecraft they communicate with are much farther away than the communication satellites which home satellite dishes use, the signals received are much weaker, requiring a larger aperture antenna to gather enough radio energy to make them intelligible. The largest, a 70-meter (230 ft) Cassegrain antenna, is used for communication with space missions to the outer planets, such as the Voyager spacecraft, which, at 21.5 billion kilometers, is the most distant manmade object from Earth. The radio frequencies used for spacecraft communication are in the microwave part of the radio spectrum; S band (2.29–2.30 GHz), X band (8.40–8.50 GHz) and Ka band (31.8–32.3 GHz). In addition to receiving radio signals from the spacecraft (downlink signals), the antennas also transmit commands to the spacecraft (uplink signals) with high power radio transmitters (80 kW) powered by klystron tubes.

A major goal in the design of the station is to reduce interference with the weak incoming downlink radio signals by natural and manmade radio noise. The remote Mojave Desert location was chosen because it is far from manmade sources of radio noise such as motor vehicles. The RF front ends of the radio receivers at the dishes use ruby masers, consisting of a bar of synthetic ruby cooled by liquid helium to 4.5 K to minimize the noise introduced by the electronics.

When not needed for spacecraft communication, the Goldstone antennas are used as sensitive radio telescopes for astronomical research, such as mapping quasars and other celestial radio sources; radar mapping planets, the Moon, comets and asteroids; spotting comets and asteroids with the potential to strike Earth; and the search for ultra-high energy neutrino interactions in the Moon by using large-aperture radio antennas.

| Photo | Name | Diameter | Date operational | Date decommissioned | Notes | Bands |
|---|---|---|---|---|---|---|
| | DSS-11 "Pioneer" | 26m | 1958 | 1978 | First antenna in Goldstone. | |
| | DSS-12 "Echo" | 34m | 1959 | 2012 | Polar-mounted antenna. From 1996 was removed from DSN operations and used for education. | S, X |
| | DSS-13 "Venus" | 34m | 1962 | | In 1962 was opened as 26m antenna, upgraded to 34m beam waveguide in 1991. In 2024, it was retrofitted with an optical terminal to track the downlink laser of the Deep Space Optical Communications (DSOC) experiment that is aboard NASA's Psyche mission. | |
| | DSS-14 "Mars" | 70m | 1966 | | Originally a 64m antenna, upgraded to 70m in 1988 to support Voyager. Cassegrain reflector on altazimuth mount. ~3850 m² aperture | |
| | DSS-15 "Uranus" | 34m | 1984 | 2018 | "High Efficiency" reflector on altazimuth mount | |
| | DSS-16 "Apollo" | 26m | 1967 | - | X-Y axis antenna, built in 1967 for the Apollo missions. It was a part of the Manned Space Flight Network. The dish is "currently in an extended downtime configuration." | |
| | DSS-23 | 34m | 2026 | | Beam waveguide reflector under construction | |
| | DSS-24, DSS-25, DSS-26 "Apollo" | 34m | 1996 | | Cluster of three beam waveguide reflectors on altazimuth mounts | |
| | DSS-27 and DSS-28 "Gemini" | 34m | 1994 | 2010 | Originally built by JPL for the army, in 1994 transferred to NASA. BWA "High Speed" Alt/Az mount. DSS-27 is decommissioned. DSS-28 was upgraded in 2010 with bandwidth radiometer and digital signal processor and is used for radio science under Goldstone Apple Valley Radio Telescope program. It is not used for the DSN operations. | |

== History ==
The Goldstone complex was created in 1958 by the JPL to support the Pioneer program of deep space exploration probes. Its location was determined by two criteria: a bowl-shaped environment was needed and it needed to be distant from terrestrial sources of radio interference. This site, on the grounds of Fort Irwin in the Mojave Desert, was found to meet the criteria. Construction of the first radio telescope, DSS 11 or the Pioneer Deep Space Station, was begun by the United States Army and taken over by NASA after its creation. It is a 26-metre (85 ft) parabolic Cassegrain antenna capable of receiving signals in the 1 to 3 GHz range. It was taken out of service in 1981, having been technologically bypassed by later telescopes. It was recognized as a National Historic Landmark in 1985 for its pioneering role in deep space exploration.

== "Goldstone has the bird" ==
It is commonly believed that the first American satellite, Explorer 1, was confirmed to be in orbit by the use of the phrase "Goldstone has the bird". However, Goldstone was not in operation at the time of Explorer 1 and like many oft-repeated quotations it is incorrect. Others claim that the actual phrase was "Gold has it!", incorrectly identifying "Gold" as a temporary tracking station at Earthquake Valley, east of Julian, California. In fact, Gold Station was located at the Air Force Missile Test Center (AFMTC) in Florida and the temporary tracking station at Earthquake Valley was Red Station. Probably this detection of the Explorer 1 signal was actually made at the Minitrack station at Brown Field, a US Navy airfield near San Diego. This station was later moved to Goldstone, accounting for the error.

== Complex tours ==
The Goldstone Deep Space Communications Complex has temporarily suspended tours for the public. However, there is a Visitor Center located in Harvey House, 681 North First Avenue, Barstow, CA 92311. Operating hours are Mondays, Thursdays, Fridays and Saturdays from 9AM - 3PM. There is no entry fee and no need to make reservations to stop by the Visitor Center.

== In popular culture ==
The 70m dish also known as Mars or DSS14 is featured in the opening sequences of the 1968 film Ice Station Zebra.

The Goldstone Facility was prominently featured in Part 1 of The Incredible Hulk episode "Prometheus".

A Boy and His Dog used the facility for the industrial looking entrance sequence to the film's world of "Down Under" according to the director's commentary. However, this was not without difficulty - the filming crew had a hard time getting access to the location.

== See also ==
- Goldstone Solar System Radar
- List of radio telescopes
- Apollo 11 missing tapes
