= Goldstone Solar System Radar =

Radar system used for investigating objects in the Solar System

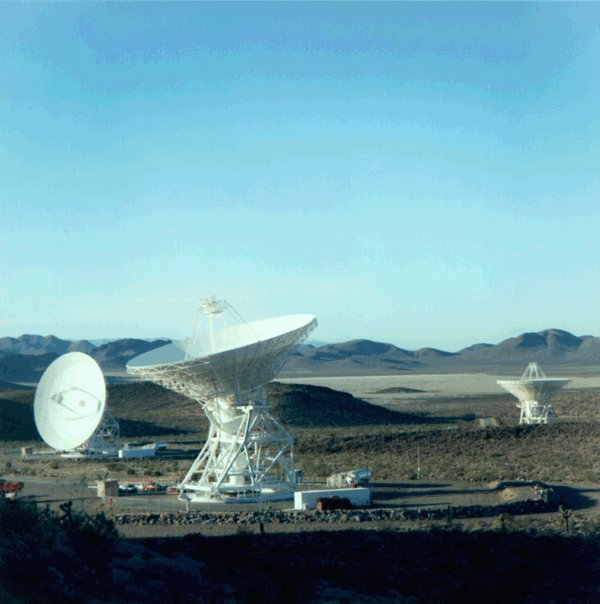
- Goldstone Deep Space Network
- Alternative names: Goldstone radar
- Location(s): California, Pacific States Region
- Coordinates: 35°25′36″N 116°53′24″W
- Altitude: 2,950 ft (900 m)
- Diameter: 70 m (229 ft 8 in)
- Website: gssr.jpl.nasa.gov
- Location of Goldstone Solar System Radar

The Goldstone Solar System Radar (GSSR) is a large radar system used for investigating objects in the Solar System, a field called radar astronomy. Located in the desert near Barstow, California, it comprises a 500-kW X-band (8500 MHz) transmitter and a low-noise receiver on the 70-m DSS 14 antenna at the Goldstone Deep Space Communications Complex. It has been used to investigate Mercury, Venus, Mars, the asteroids, and moons of Jupiter and Saturn.

The solar system radar is only active a small percentage of the time, as the 70 meter antenna is primarily used for tracking and communicating with spacecraft as part of the NASA Deep Space Network.

== Planetary observations ==
GSSR can work in two different modes. In the monostatic radar mode, GSSR both transmits and receives. In bistatic mode, GSSR transmits and other radio astronomy facilities receive. Although more difficult to schedule, this offers two advantages - the transmitter does not need to turn off to allow the receiver to listen, and it allows the use of interferometry to extract more information from the reflected signal. Since the GSSR takes about 5 seconds to switch from transmit to receive, nearby targets must necessarily use bistatic mode.

Bodies that have been investigated using GSSR include:

- Mercury: In particular, by watching specific reflected features of Mercury sweep across the Earth's surface (using spatially separated receivers), GSSR enables the pole position to be computed quite accurately. The measured librations show Mercury has a liquid core.
- Venus
- Mars: GSSR was used extensively to characterize sites for Mars landers.
- Asteroids: Small asteroids appear only as unresolved points of light in ground-based optical telescopes. Radar, however, can image near-Earth asteroids and comets with a resolution of several meters. For example, the asteroid 4179 Toutatis was imaged in 1992, 1996, 2000, 2004, 2008, and 2012. Although spacecraft such as Dawn can image particular asteroids in much finer detail, radar astronomy can investigate many more asteroids of different characteristics. For example, most existing images of binary asteroids were obtained through radar astronomy.
- Moons of Jupiter
- Rings and moons of Saturn
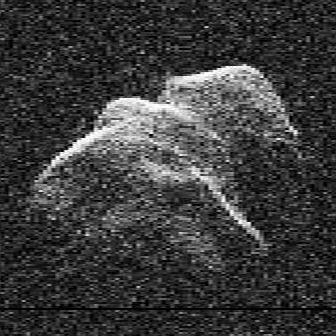
4179 Toutatis in 1996

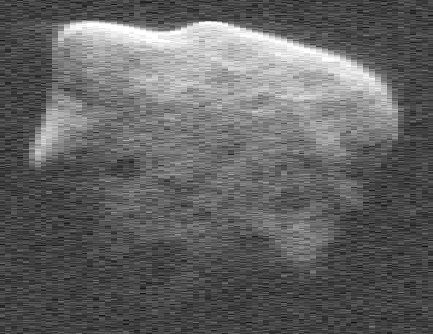
(53319) 1999 JM8 in 1999

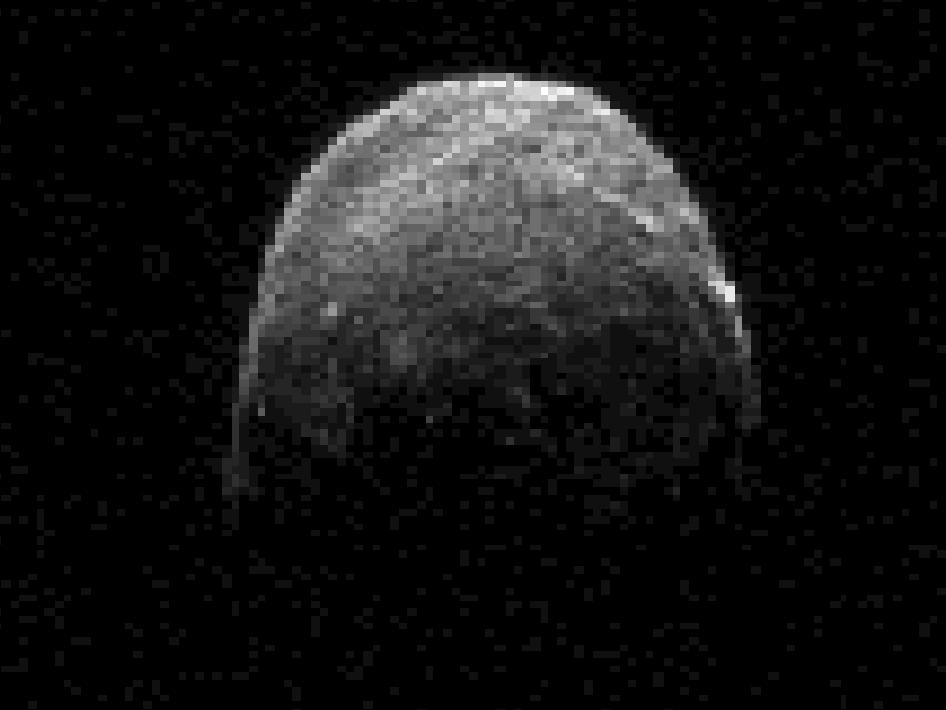
(308635) 2005 YU55 in 2011

Upcoming asteroid observations can be found online at the Goldstone Asteroid Schedule.

== Other scientific uses ==
- Recovery of the Solar and Heliospheric Observatory after loss of attitude control.
- Investigation of orbital debris around Earth.

== Similar facilities ==
The GSSR is the only planetary radar in current regular operation. Others are or were:

- The planetary radar at Arecibo Observatory, which collapsed in 2020.
- The Soviet planetary radar at the Pluton complex, since dismantled.
- The Millstone Hill and Haystack radio telescopes of the Haystack Observatory made radar observations from 1958 through at least 1970.
- The Yevpatoria RT-70 radio telescope is equipped with a powerful transmitter, and has been used in bi-static radar observations.

There are proposals and prototypes for possible additional radars:

- The Green Bank Observatory is investigating a Ku-band radar for its 100-meter radio telescope. Its low power prototype has imaged the moon.
- China is developing a planetary radar. Their initial phase has imaged the moon.
