= List of minor planets: 746001–747000 =

The following is a partial list of minor planets, running from minor-planet number 746001 through 747000, inclusive. The primary data for this and other partial lists is based on JPL's "Small-Body Orbital Elements" and data available from the Minor Planet Center. Critical list information is also provided by the MPC, unless otherwise specified from Lowell Observatory. A detailed description of the table's columns and additional sources are given on the main page including a complete list of every page in this series, and a statistical break-up on the dynamical classification of minor planets.

Also see the summary list of all named bodies in numerical and alphabetical order, and the corresponding naming citations for the number range of this particular list. New namings may only be added to this list after official publication, as the preannouncement of names is condemned by the Working Group for Small Bodies Nomenclature of the International Astronomical Union.

| Near-Earth obj. | MBA (inner) | MBA (outer) | Centaur |
| Mars-crosser | MBA (middle) | Jupiter trojan | Trans-Neptunian obj. |
| Unclassified |

== 746001–746100 ==
| Designation | | | Discovery | | | Properties | | Ref |
| Permanent | Provisional | Named after | Date | Site | Discoverer(s) | Category | Diam. | Ref |
|---|---|---|---|---|---|---|---|---|
| 746001 | 2011 QM_{102} | — | December 2, 2012 | Mount Lemmon | Mount Lemmon Survey | · | 2.1 km | MPC · JPL |
| 746002 | 2011 QS_{102} | — | February 23, 2015 | Haleakala | Pan-STARRS 1 | EOS | 1.8 km | MPC · JPL |
| 746003 | 2011 QW_{102} | — | June 27, 2015 | Haleakala | Pan-STARRS 1 | MAR | 840 m | MPC · JPL |
| 746004 | 2011 QG_{103} | — | July 26, 2011 | Siding Spring | SSS | · | 1.6 km | MPC · JPL |
| 746005 | 2011 QM_{103} | — | April 24, 2014 | Haleakala | Pan-STARRS 1 | · | 940 m | MPC · JPL |
| 746006 | 2011 QT_{105} | — | September 6, 2015 | Kitt Peak | Spacewatch | · | 890 m | MPC · JPL |
| 746007 | 2011 QV_{107} | — | October 5, 2013 | Haleakala | Pan-STARRS 1 | L5 | 6.5 km | MPC · JPL |
| 746008 | 2011 QE_{108} | — | January 7, 2014 | Mount Lemmon | Mount Lemmon Survey | · | 2.3 km | MPC · JPL |
| 746009 | 2011 QE_{110} | — | August 27, 2011 | Haleakala | Pan-STARRS 1 | · | 750 m | MPC · JPL |
| 746010 | 2011 QY_{110} | — | August 24, 2011 | Haleakala | Pan-STARRS 1 | L5 | 6.2 km | MPC · JPL |
| 746011 | 2011 QJ_{111} | — | August 27, 2011 | Haleakala | Pan-STARRS 1 | · | 1.2 km | MPC · JPL |
| 746012 | 2011 QO_{111} | — | August 24, 2011 | Haleakala | Pan-STARRS 1 | L5 | 6.1 km | MPC · JPL |
| 746013 | 2011 QH_{112} | — | August 28, 2011 | Haleakala | Pan-STARRS 1 | · | 1.3 km | MPC · JPL |
| 746014 | 2011 QQ_{112} | — | August 29, 2011 | La Sagra | OAM | EUN | 890 m | MPC · JPL |
| 746015 | 2011 RK | — | September 2, 2011 | Haleakala | Pan-STARRS 1 | · | 1.2 km | MPC · JPL |
| 746016 | 2011 RR_{3} | — | August 30, 2011 | Haleakala | Pan-STARRS 1 | L5 | 8.5 km | MPC · JPL |
| 746017 | 2011 RO_{6} | — | September 5, 2011 | Haleakala | Pan-STARRS 1 | · | 2.4 km | MPC · JPL |
| 746018 | 2011 RS_{6} | — | September 5, 2011 | Haleakala | Pan-STARRS 1 | L5 | 6.8 km | MPC · JPL |
| 746019 | 2011 RY_{6} | — | August 11, 2002 | Palomar | NEAT | · | 1.3 km | MPC · JPL |
| 746020 | 2011 RK_{7} | — | August 31, 2011 | Haleakala | Pan-STARRS 1 | · | 2.3 km | MPC · JPL |
| 746021 | 2011 RK_{15} | — | September 15, 2011 | Haleakala | Pan-STARRS 1 | · | 2.6 km | MPC · JPL |
| 746022 | 2011 RP_{16} | — | September 4, 2011 | Haleakala | Pan-STARRS 1 | H | 390 m | MPC · JPL |
| 746023 | 2011 RL_{21} | — | September 4, 2011 | Kitt Peak | Spacewatch | MAS | 490 m | MPC · JPL |
| 746024 | 2011 RX_{21} | — | September 7, 2011 | Kitt Peak | Spacewatch | · | 2.7 km | MPC · JPL |
| 746025 | 2011 RF_{22} | — | September 4, 2011 | Haleakala | Pan-STARRS 1 | · | 1.0 km | MPC · JPL |
| 746026 | 2011 RA_{24} | — | September 4, 2011 | Haleakala | Pan-STARRS 1 | · | 2.8 km | MPC · JPL |
| 746027 | 2011 RL_{29} | — | September 7, 2011 | Kitt Peak | Spacewatch | HOF | 1.9 km | MPC · JPL |
| 746028 | 2011 RH_{31} | — | September 2, 2011 | Haleakala | Pan-STARRS 1 | · | 1.4 km | MPC · JPL |
| 746029 | 2011 RK_{31} | — | September 2, 2011 | Haleakala | Pan-STARRS 1 | · | 1.5 km | MPC · JPL |
| 746030 | 2011 RS_{31} | — | September 4, 2011 | Haleakala | Pan-STARRS 1 | · | 1.3 km | MPC · JPL |
| 746031 | 2011 RT_{32} | — | September 7, 2011 | Kitt Peak | Spacewatch | · | 960 m | MPC · JPL |
| 746032 | 2011 RG_{40} | — | January 31, 2009 | Kitt Peak | Spacewatch | · | 710 m | MPC · JPL |
| 746033 | 2011 SB_{2} | — | September 21, 2000 | Kitt Peak | Deep Ecliptic Survey | NYS | 700 m | MPC · JPL |
| 746034 | 2011 SN_{2} | — | September 2, 2011 | Haleakala | Pan-STARRS 1 | HYG | 2.0 km | MPC · JPL |
| 746035 | 2011 SX_{3} | — | August 7, 2011 | Mayhill-ISON | L. Elenin | (1547) | 1.8 km | MPC · JPL |
| 746036 | 2011 SR_{6} | — | September 2, 2011 | Haleakala | Pan-STARRS 1 | AGN | 1.0 km | MPC · JPL |
| 746037 | 2011 SE_{9} | — | September 18, 2011 | La Sagra | OAM | · | 1.5 km | MPC · JPL |
| 746038 | 2011 SN_{11} | — | August 27, 2011 | Mayhill-ISON | L. Elenin | (40134) | 1.7 km | MPC · JPL |
| 746039 | 2011 SR_{11} | — | September 19, 2011 | Haleakala | Pan-STARRS 1 | · | 2.6 km | MPC · JPL |
| 746040 | 2011 SM_{12} | — | August 6, 2002 | Palomar | NEAT | · | 1.2 km | MPC · JPL |
| 746041 | 2011 SE_{15} | — | September 19, 2011 | Mount Lemmon | Mount Lemmon Survey | · | 1.3 km | MPC · JPL |
| 746042 | 2011 SN_{15} | — | August 26, 2011 | Haleakala | Pan-STARRS 1 | JUN | 810 m | MPC · JPL |
| 746043 | 2011 SG_{19} | — | September 19, 2011 | Mount Lemmon | Mount Lemmon Survey | EUN | 820 m | MPC · JPL |
| 746044 | 2011 SR_{21} | — | September 18, 2011 | Haleakala | Pan-STARRS 1 | L5 | 9.2 km | MPC · JPL |
| 746045 | 2011 SF_{23} | — | November 14, 2007 | Kitt Peak | Spacewatch | · | 980 m | MPC · JPL |
| 746046 | 2011 SW_{30} | — | August 24, 2011 | Haleakala | Pan-STARRS 1 | · | 1.9 km | MPC · JPL |
| 746047 | 2011 SK_{31} | — | November 2, 2007 | Mount Lemmon | Mount Lemmon Survey | · | 1.5 km | MPC · JPL |
| 746048 | 2011 SA_{33} | — | August 20, 2002 | Palomar | NEAT | · | 1.1 km | MPC · JPL |
| 746049 | 2011 SK_{33} | — | November 15, 2007 | Mount Lemmon | Mount Lemmon Survey | · | 1.2 km | MPC · JPL |
| 746050 | 2011 SQ_{33} | — | September 21, 2011 | Haleakala | Pan-STARRS 1 | H | 360 m | MPC · JPL |
| 746051 | 2011 SU_{33} | — | September 17, 2011 | Haleakala | Pan-STARRS 1 | · | 2.4 km | MPC · JPL |
| 746052 | 2011 SJ_{42} | — | September 18, 2011 | Mount Lemmon | Mount Lemmon Survey | · | 1.2 km | MPC · JPL |
| 746053 | 2011 SS_{53} | — | September 23, 2011 | Mount Lemmon | Mount Lemmon Survey | · | 520 m | MPC · JPL |
| 746054 | 2011 ST_{53} | — | September 23, 2011 | Mount Lemmon | Mount Lemmon Survey | · | 1.3 km | MPC · JPL |
| 746055 | 2011 SK_{55} | — | September 23, 2011 | Haleakala | Pan-STARRS 1 | EUN | 980 m | MPC · JPL |
| 746056 | 2011 SU_{55} | — | September 23, 2011 | Haleakala | Pan-STARRS 1 | · | 1.3 km | MPC · JPL |
| 746057 | 2011 SV_{55} | — | September 23, 2011 | Haleakala | Pan-STARRS 1 | AGN | 840 m | MPC · JPL |
| 746058 | 2011 SX_{56} | — | March 18, 2010 | Kitt Peak | Spacewatch | · | 990 m | MPC · JPL |
| 746059 | 2011 SL_{60} | — | September 19, 2011 | Haleakala | Pan-STARRS 1 | EOS | 1.5 km | MPC · JPL |
| 746060 | 2011 SM_{62} | — | November 2, 2007 | Kitt Peak | Spacewatch | · | 1.1 km | MPC · JPL |
| 746061 | 2011 SQ_{64} | — | September 23, 2011 | Haleakala | Pan-STARRS 1 | · | 1.2 km | MPC · JPL |
| 746062 | 2011 SJ_{67} | — | September 23, 2011 | Mayhill | Sato, H. | · | 830 m | MPC · JPL |
| 746063 | 2011 SA_{73} | — | September 19, 2011 | Mount Lemmon | Mount Lemmon Survey | 3:2 | 3.6 km | MPC · JPL |
| 746064 | 2011 SD_{75} | — | September 18, 2011 | Catalina | CSS | · | 1.4 km | MPC · JPL |
| 746065 | 2011 SL_{76} | — | September 20, 2011 | Mount Lemmon | Mount Lemmon Survey | · | 1.4 km | MPC · JPL |
| 746066 | 2011 SL_{77} | — | September 20, 2011 | Mount Lemmon | Mount Lemmon Survey | · | 2.5 km | MPC · JPL |
| 746067 | 2011 SP_{78} | — | September 4, 2011 | Haleakala | Pan-STARRS 1 | · | 1.7 km | MPC · JPL |
| 746068 | 2011 SB_{80} | — | September 20, 2011 | Mount Lemmon | Mount Lemmon Survey | · | 2.5 km | MPC · JPL |
| 746069 | 2011 SZ_{81} | — | September 20, 2011 | Mount Lemmon | Mount Lemmon Survey | · | 1.2 km | MPC · JPL |
| 746070 | 2011 SK_{84} | — | September 21, 2011 | Kitt Peak | Spacewatch | · | 1.1 km | MPC · JPL |
| 746071 | 2011 SK_{87} | — | September 22, 2011 | Kitt Peak | Spacewatch | NEM | 2.2 km | MPC · JPL |
| 746072 | 2011 SD_{94} | — | October 21, 2007 | Mount Lemmon | Mount Lemmon Survey | (5) | 1.3 km | MPC · JPL |
| 746073 | 2011 SP_{94} | — | September 24, 2011 | Mount Lemmon | Mount Lemmon Survey | · | 1.4 km | MPC · JPL |
| 746074 | 2011 SR_{94} | — | December 28, 2007 | Kitt Peak | Spacewatch | · | 960 m | MPC · JPL |
| 746075 | 2011 SX_{95} | — | September 24, 2011 | Mount Lemmon | Mount Lemmon Survey | EUN | 920 m | MPC · JPL |
| 746076 | 2011 SM_{97} | — | July 30, 2011 | Siding Spring | SSS | · | 2.4 km | MPC · JPL |
| 746077 | 2011 SY_{99} | — | September 23, 2011 | Haleakala | Pan-STARRS 1 | · | 910 m | MPC · JPL |
| 746078 | 2011 SB_{102} | — | September 24, 2011 | Mount Lemmon | Mount Lemmon Survey | · | 1.5 km | MPC · JPL |
| 746079 | 2011 SP_{103} | — | November 8, 2008 | Kitt Peak | Spacewatch | · | 500 m | MPC · JPL |
| 746080 | 2011 SV_{104} | — | September 23, 2011 | Kitt Peak | Spacewatch | · | 460 m | MPC · JPL |
| 746081 | 2011 SV_{105} | — | September 23, 2011 | Mount Lemmon | Mount Lemmon Survey | JUN | 740 m | MPC · JPL |
| 746082 | 2011 SZ_{105} | — | September 23, 2011 | Bergisch Gladbach | W. Bickel | · | 2.7 km | MPC · JPL |
| 746083 | 2011 SN_{106} | — | August 26, 2011 | Piszkéstető | K. Sárneczky | · | 1.5 km | MPC · JPL |
| 746084 | 2011 SO_{114} | — | September 20, 2011 | Catalina | CSS | · | 2.0 km | MPC · JPL |
| 746085 | 2011 SH_{118} | — | November 7, 2007 | Catalina | CSS | · | 1.2 km | MPC · JPL |
| 746086 | 2011 SV_{118} | — | September 24, 2011 | Haleakala | Pan-STARRS 1 | JUN | 900 m | MPC · JPL |
| 746087 | 2011 SE_{124} | — | September 21, 2011 | Kitt Peak | Spacewatch | · | 1.5 km | MPC · JPL |
| 746088 | 2011 SW_{125} | — | September 23, 2011 | Kitt Peak | Spacewatch | MAR | 860 m | MPC · JPL |
| 746089 | 2011 SR_{130} | — | September 20, 2011 | Kitt Peak | Spacewatch | · | 1.2 km | MPC · JPL |
| 746090 | 2011 SR_{140} | — | March 16, 2009 | Kitt Peak | Spacewatch | · | 1.3 km | MPC · JPL |
| 746091 | 2011 SS_{140} | — | September 23, 2011 | Haleakala | Pan-STARRS 1 | · | 1.7 km | MPC · JPL |
| 746092 | 2011 SE_{141} | — | September 21, 2011 | Kitt Peak | Spacewatch | · | 1.3 km | MPC · JPL |
| 746093 | 2011 SU_{142} | — | May 23, 2001 | Cerro Tololo | Deep Ecliptic Survey | · | 480 m | MPC · JPL |
| 746094 | 2011 SA_{145} | — | October 13, 2007 | Kitt Peak | Spacewatch | · | 890 m | MPC · JPL |
| 746095 | 2011 SY_{151} | — | September 8, 2011 | Kitt Peak | Spacewatch | · | 540 m | MPC · JPL |
| 746096 | 2011 SU_{155} | — | September 26, 2011 | Haleakala | Pan-STARRS 1 | MAS | 480 m | MPC · JPL |
| 746097 | 2011 SH_{159} | — | September 23, 2011 | Kitt Peak | Spacewatch | · | 1.4 km | MPC · JPL |
| 746098 | 2011 SD_{160} | — | November 1, 2007 | Kitt Peak | Spacewatch | · | 1.2 km | MPC · JPL |
| 746099 | 2011 SO_{160} | — | September 23, 2011 | Kitt Peak | Spacewatch | · | 1.5 km | MPC · JPL |
| 746100 | 2011 SM_{162} | — | February 9, 2008 | Catalina | CSS | · | 1.8 km | MPC · JPL |

== 746101–746200 ==
back to top

| Designation | | | Discovery | | | Properties | | Ref |
| Permanent | Provisional | Named after | Date | Site | Discoverer(s) | Category | Diam. | Ref |
|---|---|---|---|---|---|---|---|---|
| 746101 | 2011 SF_{166} | — | September 4, 2011 | Haleakala | Pan-STARRS 1 | · | 580 m | MPC · JPL |
| 746102 | 2011 SK_{167} | — | September 4, 2011 | Haleakala | Pan-STARRS 1 | · | 1.2 km | MPC · JPL |
| 746103 | 2011 SG_{172} | — | September 28, 2011 | Mount Lemmon | Mount Lemmon Survey | MRX | 640 m | MPC · JPL |
| 746104 | 2011 SO_{172} | — | September 28, 2011 | Mount Lemmon | Mount Lemmon Survey | · | 1.4 km | MPC · JPL |
| 746105 | 2011 ST_{173} | — | September 9, 2002 | Palomar | NEAT | · | 1.5 km | MPC · JPL |
| 746106 | 2011 SH_{174} | — | September 23, 2011 | Haleakala | Pan-STARRS 1 | GEF | 970 m | MPC · JPL |
| 746107 | 2011 SL_{174} | — | September 23, 2011 | Haleakala | Pan-STARRS 1 | · | 1.5 km | MPC · JPL |
| 746108 | 2011 SX_{179} | — | September 26, 2011 | Kitt Peak | Spacewatch | · | 1.1 km | MPC · JPL |
| 746109 | 2011 SV_{180} | — | September 26, 2011 | Kitt Peak | Spacewatch | · | 1.5 km | MPC · JPL |
| 746110 | 2011 SW_{185} | — | December 31, 2007 | Mount Lemmon | Mount Lemmon Survey | · | 1.4 km | MPC · JPL |
| 746111 | 2011 SD_{192} | — | September 24, 2011 | Haleakala | Pan-STARRS 1 | H | 450 m | MPC · JPL |
| 746112 | 2011 SE_{192} | — | March 8, 2005 | Kitt Peak | Spacewatch | H | 380 m | MPC · JPL |
| 746113 | 2011 SD_{195} | — | September 25, 2006 | Catalina | CSS | H | 560 m | MPC · JPL |
| 746114 | 2011 SQ_{199} | — | August 27, 2011 | Haleakala | Pan-STARRS 1 | (31811) | 2.3 km | MPC · JPL |
| 746115 | 2011 SU_{200} | — | September 18, 2011 | Mount Lemmon | Mount Lemmon Survey | · | 1.3 km | MPC · JPL |
| 746116 | 2011 SW_{204} | — | September 20, 2011 | Kitt Peak | Spacewatch | · | 1.3 km | MPC · JPL |
| 746117 | 2011 SV_{206} | — | August 4, 2011 | Siding Spring | SSS | · | 1.3 km | MPC · JPL |
| 746118 | 2011 SS_{210} | — | October 6, 2007 | Dauban | C. Rinner, F. Kugel | MAR | 1.1 km | MPC · JPL |
| 746119 | 2011 SE_{214} | — | September 21, 2011 | Haleakala | Pan-STARRS 1 | · | 2.4 km | MPC · JPL |
| 746120 | 2011 SH_{214} | — | March 10, 2005 | Mount Lemmon | Mount Lemmon Survey | H | 470 m | MPC · JPL |
| 746121 | 2011 SY_{220} | — | September 26, 2011 | Haleakala | Pan-STARRS 1 | HNS | 930 m | MPC · JPL |
| 746122 | 2011 ST_{223} | — | September 18, 2011 | Mount Lemmon | Mount Lemmon Survey | · | 2.2 km | MPC · JPL |
| 746123 | 2011 SV_{224} | — | September 29, 2011 | Mount Lemmon | Mount Lemmon Survey | · | 1.4 km | MPC · JPL |
| 746124 | 2011 SD_{227} | — | September 29, 2011 | Mount Lemmon | Mount Lemmon Survey | · | 940 m | MPC · JPL |
| 746125 | 2011 SX_{231} | — | August 30, 2011 | Haleakala | Pan-STARRS 1 | · | 1.4 km | MPC · JPL |
| 746126 | 2011 SX_{234} | — | September 26, 2011 | Haleakala | Pan-STARRS 1 | · | 1.6 km | MPC · JPL |
| 746127 | 2011 SS_{237} | — | September 4, 2011 | Haleakala | Pan-STARRS 1 | · | 1.2 km | MPC · JPL |
| 746128 | 2011 SQ_{239} | — | September 26, 2011 | Mount Lemmon | Mount Lemmon Survey | THM | 2.1 km | MPC · JPL |
| 746129 | 2011 SD_{249} | — | November 17, 2006 | Catalina | CSS | H | 400 m | MPC · JPL |
| 746130 | 2011 SL_{249} | — | September 25, 2011 | Haleakala | Pan-STARRS 1 | · | 1 km | MPC · JPL |
| 746131 | 2011 SR_{252} | — | September 7, 2011 | Kitt Peak | Spacewatch | · | 1.3 km | MPC · JPL |
| 746132 | 2011 ST_{252} | — | September 26, 2011 | Haleakala | Pan-STARRS 1 | · | 2.3 km | MPC · JPL |
| 746133 | 2011 SJ_{257} | — | March 29, 2009 | Kitt Peak | Spacewatch | · | 2.3 km | MPC · JPL |
| 746134 | 2011 SQ_{259} | — | September 27, 2011 | Zelenchukskaya Stn | T. V. Krjačko, Satovski, B. | · | 1.5 km | MPC · JPL |
| 746135 | 2011 SC_{261} | — | September 20, 2011 | Mount Lemmon | Mount Lemmon Survey | · | 1.4 km | MPC · JPL |
| 746136 | 2011 SS_{261} | — | September 27, 2011 | Piszkés-tető | K. Sárneczky, A. Farkas | · | 1.2 km | MPC · JPL |
| 746137 | 2011 SB_{262} | — | August 27, 2011 | Haleakala | Pan-STARRS 1 | MAS | 520 m | MPC · JPL |
| 746138 | 2011 SH_{262} | — | August 27, 2011 | Haleakala | Pan-STARRS 1 | L5 | 10 km | MPC · JPL |
| 746139 | 2011 SV_{262} | — | September 2, 2011 | Haleakala | Pan-STARRS 1 | HNS | 830 m | MPC · JPL |
| 746140 | 2011 SA_{266} | — | August 30, 2011 | Haleakala | Pan-STARRS 1 | · | 1.2 km | MPC · JPL |
| 746141 | 2011 SD_{273} | — | July 1, 2011 | Mount Lemmon | Mount Lemmon Survey | JUN | 860 m | MPC · JPL |
| 746142 | 2011 SY_{278} | — | September 26, 2011 | Kitt Peak | Spacewatch | · | 1.5 km | MPC · JPL |
| 746143 | 2011 SV_{280} | — | December 2, 2004 | Catalina | CSS | · | 970 m | MPC · JPL |
| 746144 | 2011 SX_{280} | — | September 26, 2011 | La Sagra | OAM | · | 1.5 km | MPC · JPL |
| 746145 | 2011 SC_{282} | — | September 29, 2011 | Mount Lemmon | Mount Lemmon Survey | · | 3.5 km | MPC · JPL |
| 746146 | 2011 SA_{283} | — | February 23, 2015 | Haleakala | Pan-STARRS 1 | EOS | 1.8 km | MPC · JPL |
| 746147 | 2011 SF_{283} | — | April 25, 2015 | Haleakala | Pan-STARRS 1 | · | 2.3 km | MPC · JPL |
| 746148 | 2011 SK_{283} | — | September 21, 2011 | Mount Lemmon | Mount Lemmon Survey | · | 1.2 km | MPC · JPL |
| 746149 | 2011 SN_{283} | — | February 16, 2015 | Haleakala | Pan-STARRS 1 | · | 2.7 km | MPC · JPL |
| 746150 | 2011 SS_{283} | — | September 21, 2011 | Kitt Peak | Spacewatch | · | 2.9 km | MPC · JPL |
| 746151 | 2011 ST_{283} | — | August 1, 2016 | Haleakala | Pan-STARRS 1 | VER | 2.0 km | MPC · JPL |
| 746152 | 2011 SB_{284} | — | March 23, 2014 | Mount Lemmon | Mount Lemmon Survey | · | 2.3 km | MPC · JPL |
| 746153 | 2011 SV_{284} | — | September 23, 2011 | Haleakala | Pan-STARRS 1 | · | 2.4 km | MPC · JPL |
| 746154 | 2011 SZ_{284} | — | September 23, 2011 | Kitt Peak | Spacewatch | · | 2.6 km | MPC · JPL |
| 746155 | 2011 SA_{285} | — | June 8, 2016 | Haleakala | Pan-STARRS 1 | · | 2.3 km | MPC · JPL |
| 746156 | 2011 SU_{285} | — | March 26, 2014 | Mount Lemmon | Mount Lemmon Survey | HNS | 930 m | MPC · JPL |
| 746157 | 2011 SC_{286} | — | June 8, 2016 | Haleakala | Pan-STARRS 1 | · | 3.0 km | MPC · JPL |
| 746158 | 2011 SD_{286} | — | September 24, 2011 | Mount Lemmon | Mount Lemmon Survey | · | 1.4 km | MPC · JPL |
| 746159 | 2011 SH_{286} | — | September 28, 2011 | Mount Lemmon | Mount Lemmon Survey | · | 2.3 km | MPC · JPL |
| 746160 | 2011 SW_{286} | — | September 23, 2011 | Haleakala | Pan-STARRS 1 | · | 2.5 km | MPC · JPL |
| 746161 | 2011 SE_{287} | — | September 20, 2011 | Haleakala | Pan-STARRS 1 | L5 | 7.9 km | MPC · JPL |
| 746162 | 2011 SB_{288} | — | March 31, 2014 | Kitt Peak | Spacewatch | · | 1.1 km | MPC · JPL |
| 746163 | 2011 SN_{288} | — | September 23, 2011 | Haleakala | Pan-STARRS 1 | · | 2.1 km | MPC · JPL |
| 746164 | 2011 SC_{290} | — | September 29, 2011 | Kitt Peak | Spacewatch | HOF | 1.9 km | MPC · JPL |
| 746165 | 2011 SR_{290} | — | September 18, 2011 | Mount Lemmon | Mount Lemmon Survey | · | 2.7 km | MPC · JPL |
| 746166 | 2011 ST_{291} | — | September 19, 2011 | Catalina | CSS | · | 1.8 km | MPC · JPL |
| 746167 | 2011 SG_{292} | — | May 2, 2014 | Mount Lemmon | Mount Lemmon Survey | · | 1.4 km | MPC · JPL |
| 746168 | 2011 SF_{296} | — | May 27, 2014 | Haleakala | Pan-STARRS 1 | · | 870 m | MPC · JPL |
| 746169 | 2011 SX_{298} | — | March 17, 2015 | Haleakala | Pan-STARRS 1 | · | 1.9 km | MPC · JPL |
| 746170 | 2011 SD_{302} | — | September 26, 2011 | Haleakala | Pan-STARRS 1 | · | 860 m | MPC · JPL |
| 746171 | 2011 SO_{302} | — | February 27, 2014 | Haleakala | Pan-STARRS 1 | · | 1.5 km | MPC · JPL |
| 746172 | 2011 SN_{304} | — | January 3, 2016 | Mount Lemmon | Mount Lemmon Survey | · | 810 m | MPC · JPL |
| 746173 | 2011 SU_{304} | — | January 17, 2013 | Haleakala | Pan-STARRS 1 | · | 1.5 km | MPC · JPL |
| 746174 | 2011 SD_{310} | — | September 20, 2011 | Haleakala | Pan-STARRS 1 | · | 1.0 km | MPC · JPL |
| 746175 | 2011 SY_{310} | — | September 24, 2011 | Mount Lemmon | Mount Lemmon Survey | · | 2.8 km | MPC · JPL |
| 746176 | 2011 SU_{317} | — | September 21, 2011 | Mount Lemmon | Mount Lemmon Survey | AEO | 870 m | MPC · JPL |
| 746177 | 2011 SC_{318} | — | September 20, 2011 | Haleakala | Pan-STARRS 1 | EUN | 810 m | MPC · JPL |
| 746178 | 2011 SG_{318} | — | September 20, 2011 | Catalina | CSS | · | 1.3 km | MPC · JPL |
| 746179 | 2011 SD_{319} | — | September 23, 2011 | Haleakala | Pan-STARRS 1 | · | 1.5 km | MPC · JPL |
| 746180 | 2011 SD_{321} | — | September 24, 2011 | Haleakala | Pan-STARRS 1 | · | 1.1 km | MPC · JPL |
| 746181 | 2011 ST_{321} | — | September 30, 2011 | Kitt Peak | Spacewatch | · | 1.5 km | MPC · JPL |
| 746182 | 2011 SE_{322} | — | September 23, 2011 | Haleakala | Pan-STARRS 1 | · | 1.3 km | MPC · JPL |
| 746183 | 2011 SR_{322} | — | September 23, 2011 | Haleakala | Pan-STARRS 1 | · | 1.4 km | MPC · JPL |
| 746184 | 2011 SS_{323} | — | September 19, 2011 | Haleakala | Pan-STARRS 1 | · | 1.3 km | MPC · JPL |
| 746185 | 2011 SZ_{323} | — | September 24, 2011 | Haleakala | Pan-STARRS 1 | · | 1.5 km | MPC · JPL |
| 746186 | 2011 SJ_{324} | — | September 20, 2011 | Kitt Peak | Spacewatch | · | 1.1 km | MPC · JPL |
| 746187 | 2011 ST_{324} | — | September 23, 2011 | Haleakala | Pan-STARRS 1 | · | 1.5 km | MPC · JPL |
| 746188 | 2011 SW_{324} | — | September 22, 2011 | Kitt Peak | Spacewatch | · | 1.2 km | MPC · JPL |
| 746189 | 2011 SL_{335} | — | September 20, 2011 | Haleakala | Pan-STARRS 1 | · | 1.3 km | MPC · JPL |
| 746190 | 2011 TG_{2} | — | October 3, 2011 | Catalina | CSS | ATE | 310 m | MPC · JPL |
| 746191 | 2011 TV_{2} | — | October 1, 2011 | Piszkéstető | K. Sárneczky | BAR | 1.0 km | MPC · JPL |
| 746192 | 2011 TC_{4} | — | October 3, 2011 | Mount Lemmon | Mount Lemmon Survey | APO · PHA | 310 m | MPC · JPL |
| 746193 | 2011 TN_{6} | — | November 8, 2008 | Mount Lemmon | Mount Lemmon Survey | · | 450 m | MPC · JPL |
| 746194 | 2011 TR_{8} | — | October 5, 2011 | San Pedro de Atacama | N. Morales, I. de la Cueva | H | 410 m | MPC · JPL |
| 746195 | 2011 TX_{10} | — | September 26, 2011 | Haleakala | Pan-STARRS 1 | · | 2.5 km | MPC · JPL |
| 746196 | 2011 TU_{11} | — | October 3, 2011 | XuYi | PMO NEO Survey Program | · | 2.2 km | MPC · JPL |
| 746197 | 2011 TR_{15} | — | August 28, 2011 | Siding Spring | SSS | JUN | 970 m | MPC · JPL |
| 746198 | 2011 TM_{17} | — | October 20, 2011 | Haleakala | Pan-STARRS 1 | · | 1.5 km | MPC · JPL |
| 746199 | 2011 TO_{18} | — | February 1, 2009 | Kitt Peak | Spacewatch | · | 600 m | MPC · JPL |
| 746200 | 2011 TU_{18} | — | April 5, 2014 | Haleakala | Pan-STARRS 1 | · | 1.4 km | MPC · JPL |

== 746201–746300 ==
back to top

| Designation | | | Discovery | | | Properties | | Ref |
| Permanent | Provisional | Named after | Date | Site | Discoverer(s) | Category | Diam. | Ref |
|---|---|---|---|---|---|---|---|---|
| 746201 | 2011 US | — | December 11, 2004 | Kitt Peak | Spacewatch | · | 900 m | MPC · JPL |
| 746202 | 2011 UH_{4} | — | October 18, 2011 | Mount Lemmon | Mount Lemmon Survey | · | 1.3 km | MPC · JPL |
| 746203 | 2011 UL_{9} | — | October 18, 2011 | Mount Lemmon | Mount Lemmon Survey | DOR | 1.9 km | MPC · JPL |
| 746204 | 2011 UW_{11} | — | August 28, 2011 | Siding Spring | SSS | JUN | 950 m | MPC · JPL |
| 746205 | 2011 UA_{14} | — | October 17, 2011 | Kitt Peak | Spacewatch | · | 1.5 km | MPC · JPL |
| 746206 | 2011 UM_{15} | — | September 18, 2011 | Mount Lemmon | Mount Lemmon Survey | · | 1.6 km | MPC · JPL |
| 746207 | 2011 UU_{16} | — | October 18, 2011 | Mount Lemmon | Mount Lemmon Survey | · | 2.7 km | MPC · JPL |
| 746208 | 2011 UZ_{17} | — | October 19, 2011 | Kitt Peak | Spacewatch | · | 550 m | MPC · JPL |
| 746209 | 2011 UB_{19} | — | October 19, 2011 | Mount Lemmon | Mount Lemmon Survey | EUN | 1.1 km | MPC · JPL |
| 746210 | 2011 UE_{20} | — | September 6, 2007 | Siding Spring | SSS | · | 1.4 km | MPC · JPL |
| 746211 | 2011 UY_{20} | — | July 3, 2011 | Mount Lemmon | Mount Lemmon Survey | · | 1.2 km | MPC · JPL |
| 746212 | 2011 UT_{22} | — | September 23, 2011 | Kitt Peak | Spacewatch | · | 1.3 km | MPC · JPL |
| 746213 | 2011 UO_{23} | — | October 17, 2011 | Kitt Peak | Spacewatch | · | 1.7 km | MPC · JPL |
| 746214 | 2011 UU_{23} | — | September 23, 2011 | Kitt Peak | Spacewatch | · | 1.9 km | MPC · JPL |
| 746215 | 2011 UP_{24} | — | January 15, 2007 | Catalina | CSS | · | 1.9 km | MPC · JPL |
| 746216 | 2011 UC_{27} | — | October 17, 2011 | Kitt Peak | Spacewatch | · | 1.4 km | MPC · JPL |
| 746217 | 2011 UQ_{27} | — | October 17, 2011 | Kitt Peak | Spacewatch | · | 1.5 km | MPC · JPL |
| 746218 | 2011 US_{27} | — | October 17, 2011 | Kitt Peak | Spacewatch | · | 1.9 km | MPC · JPL |
| 746219 | 2011 UZ_{27} | — | February 13, 2002 | Apache Point | SDSS | · | 630 m | MPC · JPL |
| 746220 | 2011 UV_{29} | — | September 10, 2007 | Mount Lemmon | Mount Lemmon Survey | · | 860 m | MPC · JPL |
| 746221 | 2011 UG_{31} | — | October 18, 2011 | Mount Lemmon | Mount Lemmon Survey | H | 440 m | MPC · JPL |
| 746222 | 2011 UM_{31} | — | September 21, 2011 | Kitt Peak | Spacewatch | · | 1.4 km | MPC · JPL |
| 746223 | 2011 UW_{31} | — | October 18, 2011 | Piszkés-tető | K. Sárneczky, A. Szing | (1547) | 1.4 km | MPC · JPL |
| 746224 | 2011 UX_{34} | — | December 27, 2005 | Kitt Peak | Spacewatch | · | 480 m | MPC · JPL |
| 746225 | 2011 UU_{37} | — | October 10, 2002 | Palomar | NEAT | · | 1.5 km | MPC · JPL |
| 746226 | 2011 UJ_{38} | — | December 17, 2007 | Kitt Peak | Spacewatch | · | 1.2 km | MPC · JPL |
| 746227 | 2011 UC_{40} | — | September 28, 2011 | Mount Lemmon | Mount Lemmon Survey | · | 1.4 km | MPC · JPL |
| 746228 | 2011 UY_{40} | — | July 1, 2011 | Haleakala | Pan-STARRS 1 | · | 1.1 km | MPC · JPL |
| 746229 | 2011 UZ_{42} | — | September 30, 2011 | Kitt Peak | Spacewatch | · | 1.3 km | MPC · JPL |
| 746230 | 2011 UY_{43} | — | September 26, 2011 | Kitt Peak | Spacewatch | HYG | 1.9 km | MPC · JPL |
| 746231 | 2011 UE_{51} | — | November 3, 2007 | Mount Lemmon | Mount Lemmon Survey | · | 1.2 km | MPC · JPL |
| 746232 | 2011 UP_{53} | — | September 24, 2011 | Mount Lemmon | Mount Lemmon Survey | · | 960 m | MPC · JPL |
| 746233 | 2011 UT_{56} | — | January 18, 2004 | Palomar | NEAT | · | 1.2 km | MPC · JPL |
| 746234 | 2011 UH_{58} | — | October 19, 2011 | Haleakala | Pan-STARRS 1 | PHO | 540 m | MPC · JPL |
| 746235 | 2011 UY_{65} | — | October 20, 2011 | Mount Lemmon | Mount Lemmon Survey | · | 2.4 km | MPC · JPL |
| 746236 | 2011 UT_{66} | — | October 20, 2011 | Mount Lemmon | Mount Lemmon Survey | · | 1.7 km | MPC · JPL |
| 746237 | 2011 UE_{70} | — | October 21, 2011 | Zelenchukskaya Stn | T. V. Krjačko, Satovski, B. | · | 960 m | MPC · JPL |
| 746238 | 2011 UP_{70} | — | September 29, 2011 | Kitt Peak | Spacewatch | · | 2.5 km | MPC · JPL |
| 746239 | 2011 UR_{70} | — | October 22, 2011 | Mount Lemmon | Mount Lemmon Survey | · | 810 m | MPC · JPL |
| 746240 | 2011 UU_{72} | — | October 18, 2011 | Mount Lemmon | Mount Lemmon Survey | · | 1.1 km | MPC · JPL |
| 746241 | 2011 UW_{77} | — | October 19, 2011 | Kitt Peak | Spacewatch | · | 1.4 km | MPC · JPL |
| 746242 | 2011 UX_{91} | — | September 23, 2011 | Kitt Peak | Spacewatch | · | 1.3 km | MPC · JPL |
| 746243 | 2011 UH_{94} | — | September 1, 2007 | Siding Spring | K. Sárneczky, L. Kiss | · | 700 m | MPC · JPL |
| 746244 | 2011 UO_{96} | — | October 19, 2011 | Mount Lemmon | Mount Lemmon Survey | · | 1.5 km | MPC · JPL |
| 746245 | 2011 UZ_{96} | — | September 28, 2011 | Kitt Peak | Spacewatch | · | 1.3 km | MPC · JPL |
| 746246 | 2011 UG_{99} | — | October 20, 2011 | Kitt Peak | Spacewatch | · | 1.4 km | MPC · JPL |
| 746247 | 2011 UW_{99} | — | December 15, 2007 | Mount Lemmon | Mount Lemmon Survey | · | 1.3 km | MPC · JPL |
| 746248 | 2011 UZ_{100} | — | September 23, 2011 | Haleakala | Pan-STARRS 1 | KOR | 1.1 km | MPC · JPL |
| 746249 | 2011 UG_{101} | — | October 20, 2011 | Mount Lemmon | Mount Lemmon Survey | · | 1.2 km | MPC · JPL |
| 746250 | 2011 UE_{104} | — | October 21, 2011 | Kitt Peak | Spacewatch | · | 1.8 km | MPC · JPL |
| 746251 | 2011 UN_{104} | — | October 31, 2002 | Palomar | NEAT | AEO | 970 m | MPC · JPL |
| 746252 | 2011 UY_{107} | — | October 22, 2011 | Catalina | CSS | GAL | 1.4 km | MPC · JPL |
| 746253 | 2011 UM_{109} | — | October 23, 2011 | Haleakala | Pan-STARRS 1 | H | 470 m | MPC · JPL |
| 746254 | 2011 UR_{109} | — | October 23, 2011 | Haleakala | Pan-STARRS 1 | · | 1.7 km | MPC · JPL |
| 746255 | 2011 UE_{110} | — | October 19, 2011 | Mount Lemmon | Mount Lemmon Survey | (12739) | 1.2 km | MPC · JPL |
| 746256 | 2011 UN_{112} | — | October 18, 2011 | Mount Lemmon | Mount Lemmon Survey | · | 970 m | MPC · JPL |
| 746257 | 2011 US_{113} | — | September 24, 2011 | Mount Lemmon | Mount Lemmon Survey | · | 500 m | MPC · JPL |
| 746258 | 2011 UT_{117} | — | September 21, 2011 | Haleakala | Pan-STARRS 1 | · | 1.7 km | MPC · JPL |
| 746259 | 2011 UE_{118} | — | November 6, 2007 | Mount Lemmon | Mount Lemmon Survey | · | 1.7 km | MPC · JPL |
| 746260 | 2011 UW_{118} | — | September 30, 2011 | Kitt Peak | Spacewatch | · | 1.4 km | MPC · JPL |
| 746261 | 2011 UT_{124} | — | September 29, 2011 | Kitt Peak | Spacewatch | NEM | 1.6 km | MPC · JPL |
| 746262 | 2011 UA_{125} | — | September 28, 2011 | Kitt Peak | Spacewatch | · | 1.7 km | MPC · JPL |
| 746263 | 2011 UX_{127} | — | October 20, 2011 | Mount Lemmon | Mount Lemmon Survey | AGN | 930 m | MPC · JPL |
| 746264 | 2011 UK_{131} | — | September 18, 2011 | Mount Lemmon | Mount Lemmon Survey | · | 1.1 km | MPC · JPL |
| 746265 | 2011 UP_{131} | — | October 19, 2011 | Haleakala | Pan-STARRS 1 | · | 1.1 km | MPC · JPL |
| 746266 | 2011 UN_{132} | — | April 24, 2009 | Mount Lemmon | Mount Lemmon Survey | HNS | 960 m | MPC · JPL |
| 746267 | 2011 UB_{135} | — | December 19, 2004 | Mount Lemmon | Mount Lemmon Survey | MAS | 600 m | MPC · JPL |
| 746268 | 2011 US_{135} | — | September 21, 2011 | Kitt Peak | Spacewatch | · | 1.2 km | MPC · JPL |
| 746269 | 2011 UO_{136} | — | October 20, 2011 | Kitt Peak | Spacewatch | · | 1.3 km | MPC · JPL |
| 746270 | 2011 UX_{137} | — | February 10, 2008 | Mount Lemmon | Mount Lemmon Survey | · | 1.7 km | MPC · JPL |
| 746271 | 2011 UK_{138} | — | October 21, 2011 | Mount Lemmon | Mount Lemmon Survey | · | 490 m | MPC · JPL |
| 746272 | 2011 UJ_{140} | — | October 23, 2011 | Mount Lemmon | Mount Lemmon Survey | · | 1.8 km | MPC · JPL |
| 746273 | 2011 UH_{144} | — | October 24, 2011 | Kitt Peak | Spacewatch | · | 1.3 km | MPC · JPL |
| 746274 | 2011 UB_{146} | — | October 24, 2011 | Kitt Peak | Spacewatch | EUN | 1.1 km | MPC · JPL |
| 746275 | 2011 UB_{147} | — | October 3, 1997 | Kitt Peak | Spacewatch | · | 1.5 km | MPC · JPL |
| 746276 | 2011 UE_{149} | — | October 22, 2011 | Kitt Peak | Spacewatch | · | 1.6 km | MPC · JPL |
| 746277 | 2011 UB_{150} | — | November 24, 2008 | Kitt Peak | Spacewatch | · | 550 m | MPC · JPL |
| 746278 | 2011 UT_{150} | — | September 29, 2011 | Mount Lemmon | Mount Lemmon Survey | · | 1.4 km | MPC · JPL |
| 746279 | 2011 UJ_{151} | — | November 8, 2007 | Kitt Peak | Spacewatch | · | 1.3 km | MPC · JPL |
| 746280 | 2011 UX_{156} | — | August 27, 2011 | Haleakala | Pan-STARRS 1 | H | 400 m | MPC · JPL |
| 746281 | 2011 US_{160} | — | October 21, 2011 | Mount Lemmon | Mount Lemmon Survey | · | 2.4 km | MPC · JPL |
| 746282 | 2011 UN_{163} | — | November 19, 2007 | Mount Lemmon | Mount Lemmon Survey | · | 1.0 km | MPC · JPL |
| 746283 | 2011 UA_{164} | — | October 25, 2011 | Haleakala | Pan-STARRS 1 | MAR | 930 m | MPC · JPL |
| 746284 | 2011 UB_{165} | — | October 26, 2011 | Haleakala | Pan-STARRS 1 | H | 440 m | MPC · JPL |
| 746285 | 2011 UW_{169} | — | September 23, 2011 | Kitt Peak | Spacewatch | · | 750 m | MPC · JPL |
| 746286 | 2011 UU_{171} | — | October 21, 2011 | Haleakala | Pan-STARRS 1 | · | 2.4 km | MPC · JPL |
| 746287 | 2011 UX_{171} | — | October 21, 2011 | Haleakala | Pan-STARRS 1 | · | 1.0 km | MPC · JPL |
| 746288 | 2011 UL_{175} | — | October 20, 2011 | Kitt Peak | Spacewatch | · | 1.4 km | MPC · JPL |
| 746289 | 2011 UT_{180} | — | October 24, 2011 | Haleakala | Pan-STARRS 1 | · | 1.7 km | MPC · JPL |
| 746290 | 2011 UZ_{183} | — | December 19, 2007 | Mount Lemmon | Mount Lemmon Survey | · | 1.5 km | MPC · JPL |
| 746291 | 2011 UH_{203} | — | October 26, 2011 | Haleakala | Pan-STARRS 1 | · | 1.6 km | MPC · JPL |
| 746292 | 2011 UK_{204} | — | October 26, 2011 | Haleakala | Pan-STARRS 1 | · | 1.6 km | MPC · JPL |
| 746293 | 2011 UK_{206} | — | September 23, 2011 | Haleakala | Pan-STARRS 1 | · | 1.4 km | MPC · JPL |
| 746294 | 2011 UN_{206} | — | February 13, 2004 | Kitt Peak | Spacewatch | · | 1.2 km | MPC · JPL |
| 746295 | 2011 UY_{208} | — | September 30, 2011 | Kitt Peak | Spacewatch | · | 1.2 km | MPC · JPL |
| 746296 | 2011 UH_{211} | — | November 2, 2006 | Mount Lemmon | Mount Lemmon Survey | · | 1.4 km | MPC · JPL |
| 746297 | 2011 UZ_{211} | — | October 24, 2011 | Mount Lemmon | Mount Lemmon Survey | · | 2.1 km | MPC · JPL |
| 746298 | 2011 UL_{217} | — | October 24, 2011 | Mount Lemmon | Mount Lemmon Survey | · | 1.4 km | MPC · JPL |
| 746299 | 2011 UO_{217} | — | February 2, 2009 | Kitt Peak | Spacewatch | · | 860 m | MPC · JPL |
| 746300 | 2011 US_{218} | — | September 29, 2011 | Kitt Peak | Spacewatch | · | 1.2 km | MPC · JPL |

== 746301–746400 ==
back to top

| Designation | | | Discovery | | | Properties | | Ref |
| Permanent | Provisional | Named after | Date | Site | Discoverer(s) | Category | Diam. | Ref |
|---|---|---|---|---|---|---|---|---|
| 746301 | 2011 UY_{220} | — | September 20, 2011 | Kitt Peak | Spacewatch | EUN | 1.1 km | MPC · JPL |
| 746302 | 2011 UP_{225} | — | October 20, 2011 | Mount Lemmon | Mount Lemmon Survey | · | 1.0 km | MPC · JPL |
| 746303 | 2011 UK_{226} | — | October 24, 2011 | Mount Lemmon | Mount Lemmon Survey | HOF | 2.0 km | MPC · JPL |
| 746304 | 2011 UD_{230} | — | October 24, 2011 | Mount Lemmon | Mount Lemmon Survey | · | 1.0 km | MPC · JPL |
| 746305 | 2011 UO_{230} | — | March 31, 2009 | Mount Lemmon | Mount Lemmon Survey | · | 2.4 km | MPC · JPL |
| 746306 | 2011 UV_{230} | — | September 26, 2011 | Kitt Peak | Spacewatch | · | 480 m | MPC · JPL |
| 746307 | 2011 UD_{233} | — | April 14, 2010 | Mount Lemmon | Mount Lemmon Survey | JUN | 720 m | MPC · JPL |
| 746308 | 2011 UP_{234} | — | October 24, 2011 | Haleakala | Pan-STARRS 1 | · | 470 m | MPC · JPL |
| 746309 | 2011 UK_{236} | — | October 22, 2011 | Kitt Peak | Spacewatch | · | 1.2 km | MPC · JPL |
| 746310 | 2011 UQ_{236} | — | November 2, 2007 | Kitt Peak | Spacewatch | (5) | 960 m | MPC · JPL |
| 746311 | 2011 UK_{238} | — | October 24, 2011 | Haleakala | Pan-STARRS 1 | · | 1.2 km | MPC · JPL |
| 746312 | 2011 UT_{240} | — | October 19, 2011 | Mount Lemmon | Mount Lemmon Survey | EUN | 1.1 km | MPC · JPL |
| 746313 | 2011 UV_{242} | — | October 25, 2011 | Haleakala | Pan-STARRS 1 | · | 1.3 km | MPC · JPL |
| 746314 | 2011 UA_{244} | — | October 3, 2011 | Mount Lemmon | Mount Lemmon Survey | · | 1.4 km | MPC · JPL |
| 746315 | 2011 UJ_{249} | — | October 26, 2011 | Haleakala | Pan-STARRS 1 | EUN | 1.2 km | MPC · JPL |
| 746316 | 2011 UK_{251} | — | October 26, 2011 | Haleakala | Pan-STARRS 1 | · | 1.8 km | MPC · JPL |
| 746317 | 2011 UT_{253} | — | October 19, 2011 | Mount Lemmon | Mount Lemmon Survey | EUN | 870 m | MPC · JPL |
| 746318 | 2011 UC_{256} | — | October 30, 2011 | Catalina | CSS | · | 1.9 km | MPC · JPL |
| 746319 | 2011 US_{256} | — | October 18, 2011 | Catalina | CSS | · | 1.6 km | MPC · JPL |
| 746320 | 2011 UU_{258} | — | October 24, 2011 | Haleakala | Pan-STARRS 1 | · | 1.1 km | MPC · JPL |
| 746321 | 2011 UG_{262} | — | October 23, 2011 | Kitt Peak | Spacewatch | · | 1.0 km | MPC · JPL |
| 746322 | 2011 UW_{265} | — | October 21, 2011 | Mount Lemmon | Mount Lemmon Survey | · | 520 m | MPC · JPL |
| 746323 | 2011 UC_{269} | — | September 12, 2002 | Palomar | NEAT | · | 1.1 km | MPC · JPL |
| 746324 | 2011 UC_{270} | — | December 16, 2007 | Kitt Peak | Spacewatch | · | 1.3 km | MPC · JPL |
| 746325 | 2011 UA_{275} | — | October 23, 2011 | Kitt Peak | Spacewatch | · | 1.9 km | MPC · JPL |
| 746326 | 2011 UU_{277} | — | October 25, 2011 | Haleakala | Pan-STARRS 1 | · | 1.0 km | MPC · JPL |
| 746327 | 2011 UW_{278} | — | October 25, 2011 | Haleakala | Pan-STARRS 1 | · | 1.6 km | MPC · JPL |
| 746328 | 2011 UP_{279} | — | October 25, 2011 | Haleakala | Pan-STARRS 1 | KOR | 1.1 km | MPC · JPL |
| 746329 | 2011 UX_{279} | — | July 21, 2006 | Catalina | CSS | · | 1.4 km | MPC · JPL |
| 746330 | 2011 UE_{280} | — | October 21, 2011 | Mount Lemmon | Mount Lemmon Survey | · | 1.2 km | MPC · JPL |
| 746331 | 2011 UR_{285} | — | October 6, 2011 | Piszkéstető | K. Sárneczky | JUN | 1.2 km | MPC · JPL |
| 746332 | 2011 UB_{287} | — | October 31, 2011 | Mount Lemmon | Mount Lemmon Survey | · | 1.5 km | MPC · JPL |
| 746333 | 2011 UC_{292} | — | October 31, 2011 | Mount Lemmon | Mount Lemmon Survey | APO | 90 m | MPC · JPL |
| 746334 | 2011 UU_{292} | — | October 26, 2011 | Mayhill-ISON | L. Elenin | · | 1.3 km | MPC · JPL |
| 746335 | 2011 UZ_{292} | — | December 22, 2008 | Kitt Peak | Spacewatch | · | 500 m | MPC · JPL |
| 746336 | 2011 UG_{298} | — | October 29, 2011 | Kitt Peak | Spacewatch | GEF | 950 m | MPC · JPL |
| 746337 | 2011 US_{300} | — | October 29, 2011 | Zelenchukskaya Stn | T. V. Krjačko, Satovski, B. | H | 390 m | MPC · JPL |
| 746338 | 2011 UD_{301} | — | October 8, 2004 | Kitt Peak | Spacewatch | · | 810 m | MPC · JPL |
| 746339 | 2011 UM_{302} | — | October 4, 2011 | Piszkés-tető | K. Sárneczky, S. Kürti | · | 1.2 km | MPC · JPL |
| 746340 | 2011 UQ_{311} | — | October 22, 2011 | Kitt Peak | Spacewatch | · | 1.3 km | MPC · JPL |
| 746341 | 2011 UT_{312} | — | October 30, 2011 | Kitt Peak | Spacewatch | · | 1.1 km | MPC · JPL |
| 746342 | 2011 UC_{313} | — | October 30, 2011 | Kitt Peak | Spacewatch | · | 1.2 km | MPC · JPL |
| 746343 | 2011 UV_{318} | — | July 30, 2005 | Palomar | NEAT | · | 2.2 km | MPC · JPL |
| 746344 | 2011 UZ_{319} | — | October 30, 2011 | Kitt Peak | Spacewatch | · | 1.6 km | MPC · JPL |
| 746345 | 2011 UQ_{322} | — | September 25, 2011 | Haleakala | Pan-STARRS 1 | · | 1.1 km | MPC · JPL |
| 746346 | 2011 UV_{324} | — | August 29, 2006 | Kitt Peak | Spacewatch | · | 1.6 km | MPC · JPL |
| 746347 | 2011 UB_{332} | — | October 25, 2011 | Haleakala | Pan-STARRS 1 | · | 1.6 km | MPC · JPL |
| 746348 | 2011 UL_{332} | — | September 25, 2011 | Haleakala | Pan-STARRS 1 | · | 1.7 km | MPC · JPL |
| 746349 | 2011 UY_{333} | — | October 29, 2011 | Haleakala | Pan-STARRS 1 | · | 1.2 km | MPC · JPL |
| 746350 | 2011 UL_{336} | — | August 30, 2002 | Palomar | NEAT | · | 1.3 km | MPC · JPL |
| 746351 | 2011 UK_{339} | — | October 19, 2011 | Kitt Peak | Spacewatch | · | 1.9 km | MPC · JPL |
| 746352 | 2011 UZ_{339} | — | October 18, 2011 | Kitt Peak | Spacewatch | · | 1.2 km | MPC · JPL |
| 746353 | 2011 UK_{341} | — | October 18, 2011 | Mount Lemmon | Mount Lemmon Survey | · | 930 m | MPC · JPL |
| 746354 | 2011 UL_{349} | — | September 23, 2011 | Kitt Peak | Spacewatch | · | 1.9 km | MPC · JPL |
| 746355 | 2011 UL_{350} | — | October 19, 2011 | Mount Lemmon | Mount Lemmon Survey | · | 1.4 km | MPC · JPL |
| 746356 | 2011 UF_{353} | — | October 20, 2011 | Mount Lemmon | Mount Lemmon Survey | EUP | 2.6 km | MPC · JPL |
| 746357 | 2011 UN_{354} | — | January 4, 2006 | Kitt Peak | Spacewatch | · | 490 m | MPC · JPL |
| 746358 | 2011 UF_{355} | — | October 20, 2011 | Mount Lemmon | Mount Lemmon Survey | · | 540 m | MPC · JPL |
| 746359 | 2011 UQ_{355} | — | December 4, 2007 | Kitt Peak | Spacewatch | · | 1.1 km | MPC · JPL |
| 746360 | 2011 UV_{355} | — | September 28, 2011 | Kitt Peak | Spacewatch | · | 2.5 km | MPC · JPL |
| 746361 | 2011 UZ_{360} | — | October 21, 2011 | Kitt Peak | Spacewatch | · | 1.5 km | MPC · JPL |
| 746362 | 2011 UN_{361} | — | September 27, 2011 | Mount Lemmon | Mount Lemmon Survey | · | 2.1 km | MPC · JPL |
| 746363 | 2011 UM_{362} | — | September 27, 2011 | Les Engarouines | L. Bernasconi | · | 1.7 km | MPC · JPL |
| 746364 | 2011 UT_{362} | — | October 22, 2011 | Kitt Peak | Spacewatch | · | 2.9 km | MPC · JPL |
| 746365 | 2011 UB_{365} | — | October 22, 2011 | Mount Lemmon | Mount Lemmon Survey | EUN | 910 m | MPC · JPL |
| 746366 | 2011 UE_{366} | — | September 30, 2011 | Kitt Peak | Spacewatch | · | 1.7 km | MPC · JPL |
| 746367 | 2011 UL_{373} | — | November 2, 2007 | Kitt Peak | Spacewatch | · | 1.2 km | MPC · JPL |
| 746368 | 2011 UU_{373} | — | October 23, 2011 | Mount Lemmon | Mount Lemmon Survey | · | 2.4 km | MPC · JPL |
| 746369 | 2011 UZ_{373} | — | November 19, 2007 | Mount Lemmon | Mount Lemmon Survey | · | 1.2 km | MPC · JPL |
| 746370 | 2011 UJ_{374} | — | October 18, 2011 | Catalina | CSS | (194) | 870 m | MPC · JPL |
| 746371 | 2011 UJ_{375} | — | October 23, 2011 | Mount Lemmon | Mount Lemmon Survey | RAF | 800 m | MPC · JPL |
| 746372 | 2011 UR_{380} | — | October 24, 2011 | Mount Lemmon | Mount Lemmon Survey | · | 830 m | MPC · JPL |
| 746373 | 2011 UJ_{381} | — | October 24, 2011 | Mount Lemmon | Mount Lemmon Survey | · | 2.1 km | MPC · JPL |
| 746374 | 2011 UR_{389} | — | October 26, 2011 | Mayhill-ISON | L. Elenin | · | 1.3 km | MPC · JPL |
| 746375 | 2011 UJ_{390} | — | October 26, 2011 | Haleakala | Pan-STARRS 1 | · | 500 m | MPC · JPL |
| 746376 | 2011 UX_{392} | — | September 24, 2011 | Haleakala | Pan-STARRS 1 | · | 1.7 km | MPC · JPL |
| 746377 | 2011 UJ_{395} | — | September 25, 2011 | Haleakala | Pan-STARRS 1 | · | 840 m | MPC · JPL |
| 746378 | 2011 UE_{396} | — | October 29, 2011 | Haleakala | Pan-STARRS 1 | JUN | 900 m | MPC · JPL |
| 746379 | 2011 UV_{397} | — | March 29, 2009 | Kitt Peak | Spacewatch | · | 1.4 km | MPC · JPL |
| 746380 | 2011 UX_{400} | — | October 17, 2011 | Piszkés-tető | K. Sárneczky, A. Szing | EUN | 1.2 km | MPC · JPL |
| 746381 | 2011 US_{403} | — | October 18, 2011 | Haleakala | Pan-STARRS 1 | MAR | 1.1 km | MPC · JPL |
| 746382 | 2011 UQ_{405} | — | December 17, 2007 | Mount Lemmon | Mount Lemmon Survey | · | 1.5 km | MPC · JPL |
| 746383 | 2011 UJ_{407} | — | October 17, 2011 | Palomar | Palomar Transient Factory | · | 1.3 km | MPC · JPL |
| 746384 | 2011 UF_{415} | — | October 19, 2011 | Mount Lemmon | Mount Lemmon Survey | HNS | 780 m | MPC · JPL |
| 746385 | 2011 UV_{415} | — | October 19, 2011 | Kitt Peak | Spacewatch | · | 1.3 km | MPC · JPL |
| 746386 | 2011 UA_{416} | — | October 21, 2011 | Kitt Peak | Spacewatch | · | 1.5 km | MPC · JPL |
| 746387 | 2011 UP_{416} | — | November 2, 2007 | Kitt Peak | Spacewatch | · | 980 m | MPC · JPL |
| 746388 | 2011 US_{416} | — | October 24, 2011 | Haleakala | Pan-STARRS 1 | · | 1.0 km | MPC · JPL |
| 746389 | 2011 UT_{417} | — | October 27, 2011 | Mount Lemmon | Mount Lemmon Survey | EUN | 960 m | MPC · JPL |
| 746390 | 2011 UC_{418} | — | October 26, 2011 | Haleakala | Pan-STARRS 1 | · | 960 m | MPC · JPL |
| 746391 | 2011 UV_{418} | — | October 20, 2011 | Mount Lemmon | Mount Lemmon Survey | · | 510 m | MPC · JPL |
| 746392 | 2011 UA_{421} | — | May 20, 2014 | Haleakala | Pan-STARRS 1 | · | 2.2 km | MPC · JPL |
| 746393 | 2011 UL_{421} | — | October 28, 2011 | Mount Lemmon | Mount Lemmon Survey | · | 1.2 km | MPC · JPL |
| 746394 | 2011 UM_{421} | — | July 3, 2016 | Mount Lemmon | Mount Lemmon Survey | HYG | 2.3 km | MPC · JPL |
| 746395 | 2011 US_{421} | — | September 11, 2002 | Palomar | NEAT | · | 1.3 km | MPC · JPL |
| 746396 | 2011 UD_{422} | — | March 6, 2013 | Haleakala | Pan-STARRS 1 | · | 540 m | MPC · JPL |
| 746397 | 2011 UK_{422} | — | October 18, 2011 | Mount Lemmon | Mount Lemmon Survey | H | 350 m | MPC · JPL |
| 746398 | 2011 UC_{423} | — | August 3, 2016 | Haleakala | Pan-STARRS 1 | · | 2.3 km | MPC · JPL |
| 746399 | 2011 UD_{423} | — | October 24, 2011 | Haleakala | Pan-STARRS 1 | NEM | 1.6 km | MPC · JPL |
| 746400 | 2011 UL_{423} | — | October 26, 2011 | Haleakala | Pan-STARRS 1 | · | 1.7 km | MPC · JPL |

== 746401–746500 ==
back to top

| Designation | | | Discovery | | | Properties | | Ref |
| Permanent | Provisional | Named after | Date | Site | Discoverer(s) | Category | Diam. | Ref |
|---|---|---|---|---|---|---|---|---|
| 746401 | 2011 UC_{424} | — | May 15, 2015 | Haleakala | Pan-STARRS 1 | URS | 2.9 km | MPC · JPL |
| 746402 | 2011 UJ_{424} | — | May 7, 2014 | Haleakala | Pan-STARRS 1 | · | 1.2 km | MPC · JPL |
| 746403 | 2011 UG_{425} | — | May 23, 2014 | Haleakala | Pan-STARRS 1 | · | 1.3 km | MPC · JPL |
| 746404 | 2011 UB_{427} | — | December 23, 2012 | Haleakala | Pan-STARRS 1 | · | 2.2 km | MPC · JPL |
| 746405 | 2011 UE_{427} | — | June 1, 2013 | Kitt Peak | Spacewatch | H | 420 m | MPC · JPL |
| 746406 | 2011 UF_{428} | — | January 2, 2017 | Haleakala | Pan-STARRS 1 | HNS | 850 m | MPC · JPL |
| 746407 | 2011 UP_{433} | — | October 19, 2011 | Mount Lemmon | Mount Lemmon Survey | · | 800 m | MPC · JPL |
| 746408 | 2011 UZ_{433} | — | November 2, 2015 | Haleakala | Pan-STARRS 1 | · | 1.2 km | MPC · JPL |
| 746409 | 2011 UD_{434} | — | January 19, 2017 | Mount Lemmon | Mount Lemmon Survey | · | 1.1 km | MPC · JPL |
| 746410 | 2011 UH_{434} | — | October 13, 2015 | Haleakala | Pan-STARRS 1 | · | 920 m | MPC · JPL |
| 746411 | 2011 UK_{434} | — | October 23, 2011 | Kitt Peak | Spacewatch | · | 1.2 km | MPC · JPL |
| 746412 | 2011 UU_{434} | — | October 23, 2011 | Mount Lemmon | Mount Lemmon Survey | · | 1.7 km | MPC · JPL |
| 746413 | 2011 UV_{434} | — | February 28, 2014 | Haleakala | Pan-STARRS 1 | · | 2.5 km | MPC · JPL |
| 746414 | 2011 UF_{436} | — | May 13, 2013 | Mount Lemmon | Mount Lemmon Survey | H | 360 m | MPC · JPL |
| 746415 | 2011 UP_{436} | — | October 24, 2011 | Haleakala | Pan-STARRS 1 | · | 1.3 km | MPC · JPL |
| 746416 | 2011 UT_{436} | — | January 17, 2013 | Haleakala | Pan-STARRS 1 | · | 1.6 km | MPC · JPL |
| 746417 | 2011 UA_{437} | — | October 24, 2011 | Haleakala | Pan-STARRS 1 | · | 1.2 km | MPC · JPL |
| 746418 | 2011 UG_{437} | — | October 27, 2011 | Mount Lemmon | Mount Lemmon Survey | · | 3.4 km | MPC · JPL |
| 746419 | 2011 UO_{440} | — | October 24, 2011 | Haleakala | Pan-STARRS 1 | · | 1.4 km | MPC · JPL |
| 746420 | 2011 UH_{441} | — | October 30, 2011 | Kitt Peak | Spacewatch | · | 1.9 km | MPC · JPL |
| 746421 | 2011 UV_{445} | — | February 3, 2013 | Haleakala | Pan-STARRS 1 | · | 1.2 km | MPC · JPL |
| 746422 | 2011 UB_{450} | — | October 20, 2011 | Mount Lemmon | Mount Lemmon Survey | · | 2.2 km | MPC · JPL |
| 746423 | 2011 UQ_{453} | — | October 18, 2011 | Kitt Peak | Spacewatch | · | 2.3 km | MPC · JPL |
| 746424 | 2011 UO_{456} | — | October 18, 2011 | Kitt Peak | Spacewatch | · | 1.4 km | MPC · JPL |
| 746425 | 2011 UT_{462} | — | October 22, 2011 | Mount Lemmon | Mount Lemmon Survey | NEM | 1.6 km | MPC · JPL |
| 746426 | 2011 UY_{462} | — | October 25, 2011 | Haleakala | Pan-STARRS 1 | · | 1.4 km | MPC · JPL |
| 746427 | 2011 UM_{464} | — | October 23, 2011 | Haleakala | Pan-STARRS 1 | · | 1.1 km | MPC · JPL |
| 746428 | 2011 UP_{467} | — | October 22, 2011 | Mount Lemmon | Mount Lemmon Survey | · | 1.2 km | MPC · JPL |
| 746429 | 2011 UL_{468} | — | October 21, 2011 | Kitt Peak | Spacewatch | · | 2.6 km | MPC · JPL |
| 746430 | 2011 UB_{485} | — | September 28, 2001 | Palomar | NEAT | · | 540 m | MPC · JPL |
| 746431 | 2011 UK_{488} | — | October 23, 2011 | Mount Lemmon | Mount Lemmon Survey | · | 1.3 km | MPC · JPL |
| 746432 | 2011 VC | — | November 1, 2011 | Bergisch Gladbach | W. Bickel | · | 540 m | MPC · JPL |
| 746433 | 2011 VN_{2} | — | December 31, 2007 | Kitt Peak | Spacewatch | · | 1.4 km | MPC · JPL |
| 746434 | 2011 VU_{4} | — | November 2, 2011 | Mount Lemmon | Mount Lemmon Survey | · | 3.0 km | MPC · JPL |
| 746435 | 2011 VB_{10} | — | September 29, 2011 | Kitt Peak | Spacewatch | MAS | 510 m | MPC · JPL |
| 746436 | 2011 VP_{11} | — | November 15, 2011 | Kitt Peak | Spacewatch | · | 1.5 km | MPC · JPL |
| 746437 | 2011 VP_{24} | — | November 1, 2011 | Mount Lemmon | Mount Lemmon Survey | HNS | 1.2 km | MPC · JPL |
| 746438 | 2011 VZ_{25} | — | November 7, 2011 | Piszkés-tető | K. Sárneczky, K. Vida | · | 1.4 km | MPC · JPL |
| 746439 | 2011 VD_{26} | — | November 15, 2011 | Mount Lemmon | Mount Lemmon Survey | · | 500 m | MPC · JPL |
| 746440 | 2011 VE_{26} | — | February 15, 2013 | Haleakala | Pan-STARRS 1 | · | 1.5 km | MPC · JPL |
| 746441 | 2011 VH_{26} | — | January 18, 2013 | Mount Lemmon | Mount Lemmon Survey | · | 2.1 km | MPC · JPL |
| 746442 | 2011 VD_{29} | — | July 11, 2016 | Haleakala | Pan-STARRS 1 | · | 2.5 km | MPC · JPL |
| 746443 | 2011 VH_{29} | — | January 10, 2013 | Haleakala | Pan-STARRS 1 | EUN | 1.0 km | MPC · JPL |
| 746444 | 2011 VK_{29} | — | September 6, 2014 | Mount Lemmon | Mount Lemmon Survey | · | 700 m | MPC · JPL |
| 746445 | 2011 VP_{29} | — | April 8, 2013 | Mount Lemmon | Mount Lemmon Survey | · | 610 m | MPC · JPL |
| 746446 | 2011 VZ_{29} | — | February 10, 2013 | Nogales | M. Schwartz, P. R. Holvorcem | · | 1.8 km | MPC · JPL |
| 746447 | 2011 VA_{30} | — | November 3, 2011 | Mount Lemmon | Mount Lemmon Survey | · | 1.5 km | MPC · JPL |
| 746448 | 2011 VJ_{32} | — | November 2, 2011 | Mount Lemmon | Mount Lemmon Survey | · | 1.6 km | MPC · JPL |
| 746449 | 2011 VK_{32} | — | November 3, 2011 | Kitt Peak | Spacewatch | · | 1.6 km | MPC · JPL |
| 746450 | 2011 VQ_{32} | — | November 15, 2011 | Mount Lemmon | Mount Lemmon Survey | · | 1.3 km | MPC · JPL |
| 746451 | 2011 VU_{33} | — | November 2, 2011 | Kitt Peak | Spacewatch | (1298) | 2.1 km | MPC · JPL |
| 746452 | 2011 WV | — | October 30, 2011 | Westfield | R. Holmes | · | 1.9 km | MPC · JPL |
| 746453 | 2011 WK_{3} | — | September 21, 2011 | Kitt Peak | Spacewatch | · | 1.6 km | MPC · JPL |
| 746454 | 2011 WT_{4} | — | December 14, 2006 | Socorro | LINEAR | H | 590 m | MPC · JPL |
| 746455 | 2011 WW_{9} | — | October 22, 2011 | Kitt Peak | Spacewatch | · | 1.6 km | MPC · JPL |
| 746456 | 2011 WQ_{10} | — | October 26, 2011 | Haleakala | Pan-STARRS 1 | · | 1.4 km | MPC · JPL |
| 746457 | 2011 WJ_{17} | — | November 15, 2011 | Kitt Peak | Spacewatch | MAR | 870 m | MPC · JPL |
| 746458 | 2011 WE_{20} | — | November 17, 2011 | Mount Lemmon | Mount Lemmon Survey | · | 980 m | MPC · JPL |
| 746459 | 2011 WY_{26} | — | October 25, 2011 | Haleakala | Pan-STARRS 1 | H | 410 m | MPC · JPL |
| 746460 | 2011 WJ_{27} | — | October 20, 2011 | Mount Lemmon | Mount Lemmon Survey | · | 1.5 km | MPC · JPL |
| 746461 | 2011 WF_{29} | — | October 24, 2011 | Haleakala | Pan-STARRS 1 | ADE | 1.6 km | MPC · JPL |
| 746462 | 2011 WJ_{29} | — | September 27, 2006 | Catalina | CSS | · | 2.1 km | MPC · JPL |
| 746463 | 2011 WP_{29} | — | November 22, 2011 | Piszkés-tető | K. Sárneczky, A. Pál | THB | 3.4 km | MPC · JPL |
| 746464 | 2011 WH_{30} | — | November 21, 2011 | Bergisch Gladbach | W. Bickel | · | 1.6 km | MPC · JPL |
| 746465 | 2011 WW_{30} | — | October 25, 2011 | Haleakala | Pan-STARRS 1 | · | 1.4 km | MPC · JPL |
| 746466 | 2011 WD_{33} | — | October 20, 2011 | Mount Lemmon | Mount Lemmon Survey | · | 3.0 km | MPC · JPL |
| 746467 | 2011 WT_{34} | — | September 24, 2011 | Mount Lemmon | Mount Lemmon Survey | · | 1.1 km | MPC · JPL |
| 746468 | 2011 WJ_{41} | — | November 24, 2011 | Zelenchukskaya Stn | T. V. Krjačko, Satovski, B. | · | 1.4 km | MPC · JPL |
| 746469 | 2011 WU_{41} | — | October 30, 2011 | Mount Lemmon | Mount Lemmon Survey | · | 2.2 km | MPC · JPL |
| 746470 | 2011 WK_{42} | — | November 23, 2011 | Kitt Peak | Spacewatch | · | 1.3 km | MPC · JPL |
| 746471 | 2011 WM_{43} | — | October 20, 2011 | Kitt Peak | Spacewatch | 526 | 1.8 km | MPC · JPL |
| 746472 | 2011 WN_{43} | — | October 27, 2011 | Kitt Peak | Spacewatch | · | 1.9 km | MPC · JPL |
| 746473 | 2011 WX_{44} | — | November 23, 2011 | Mount Lemmon | Mount Lemmon Survey | · | 550 m | MPC · JPL |
| 746474 | 2011 WS_{52} | — | November 8, 2011 | Haleakala | Pan-STARRS 1 | BAR | 1.6 km | MPC · JPL |
| 746475 | 2011 WK_{56} | — | October 26, 2011 | Haleakala | Pan-STARRS 1 | EUN | 1.3 km | MPC · JPL |
| 746476 | 2011 WD_{57} | — | October 21, 2011 | Mount Lemmon | Mount Lemmon Survey | · | 1.1 km | MPC · JPL |
| 746477 | 2011 WY_{58} | — | December 19, 2007 | Mount Lemmon | Mount Lemmon Survey | · | 1.5 km | MPC · JPL |
| 746478 | 2011 WZ_{62} | — | November 17, 2011 | Catalina | CSS | EUN | 1.2 km | MPC · JPL |
| 746479 | 2011 WK_{63} | — | October 27, 2011 | Mount Lemmon | Mount Lemmon Survey | · | 1.7 km | MPC · JPL |
| 746480 | 2011 WY_{65} | — | November 22, 2011 | Les Engarouines | L. Bernasconi | · | 1.0 km | MPC · JPL |
| 746481 | 2011 WS_{70} | — | October 20, 2011 | Mount Lemmon | Mount Lemmon Survey | · | 520 m | MPC · JPL |
| 746482 | 2011 WM_{74} | — | November 29, 2011 | Mount Lemmon | Mount Lemmon Survey | H | 420 m | MPC · JPL |
| 746483 | 2011 WD_{78} | — | November 16, 2011 | Mount Lemmon | Mount Lemmon Survey | · | 1.2 km | MPC · JPL |
| 746484 | 2011 WW_{79} | — | October 26, 2011 | Haleakala | Pan-STARRS 1 | · | 2.3 km | MPC · JPL |
| 746485 | 2011 WD_{82} | — | September 14, 2002 | Palomar | NEAT | · | 1.1 km | MPC · JPL |
| 746486 | 2011 WK_{87} | — | October 26, 2011 | Haleakala | Pan-STARRS 1 | · | 1.4 km | MPC · JPL |
| 746487 | 2011 WK_{94} | — | October 21, 2011 | Mount Lemmon | Mount Lemmon Survey | · | 1.1 km | MPC · JPL |
| 746488 | 2011 WN_{95} | — | October 23, 2011 | Kitt Peak | Spacewatch | · | 1.1 km | MPC · JPL |
| 746489 | 2011 WY_{106} | — | November 20, 2003 | Socorro | LINEAR | T_{j} (2.94) · 3:2 | 4.4 km | MPC · JPL |
| 746490 | 2011 WG_{109} | — | September 17, 2006 | Kitt Peak | Spacewatch | AGN | 930 m | MPC · JPL |
| 746491 | 2011 WA_{111} | — | November 30, 2011 | Mount Lemmon | Mount Lemmon Survey | · | 1.6 km | MPC · JPL |
| 746492 | 2011 WS_{117} | — | October 20, 2011 | Kitt Peak | Spacewatch | MAS | 570 m | MPC · JPL |
| 746493 | 2011 WR_{120} | — | November 24, 2011 | Catalina | CSS | · | 1.3 km | MPC · JPL |
| 746494 | 2011 WU_{122} | — | October 21, 2011 | Mount Lemmon | Mount Lemmon Survey | · | 1.1 km | MPC · JPL |
| 746495 | 2011 WU_{128} | — | December 18, 2007 | Mount Lemmon | Mount Lemmon Survey | NEM | 1.9 km | MPC · JPL |
| 746496 | 2011 WB_{132} | — | October 27, 2011 | Mount Lemmon | Mount Lemmon Survey | · | 2.0 km | MPC · JPL |
| 746497 | 2011 WT_{134} | — | November 24, 2011 | Catalina | CSS | · | 810 m | MPC · JPL |
| 746498 | 2011 WJ_{137} | — | October 26, 2011 | Haleakala | Pan-STARRS 1 | · | 1.5 km | MPC · JPL |
| 746499 | 2011 WP_{139} | — | November 17, 2011 | Mount Lemmon | Mount Lemmon Survey | · | 1.9 km | MPC · JPL |
| 746500 | 2011 WG_{141} | — | October 25, 2011 | Haleakala | Pan-STARRS 1 | · | 1.4 km | MPC · JPL |

== 746501–746600 ==
back to top

| Designation | | | Discovery | | | Properties | | Ref |
| Permanent | Provisional | Named after | Date | Site | Discoverer(s) | Category | Diam. | Ref |
|---|---|---|---|---|---|---|---|---|
| 746501 | 2011 WV_{142} | — | October 24, 2011 | Haleakala | Pan-STARRS 1 | · | 1.3 km | MPC · JPL |
| 746502 | 2011 WD_{150} | — | November 3, 2011 | Mount Lemmon | Mount Lemmon Survey | · | 1.4 km | MPC · JPL |
| 746503 | 2011 WN_{150} | — | December 1, 2011 | Haleakala | Pan-STARRS 1 | · | 1.3 km | MPC · JPL |
| 746504 | 2011 WR_{151} | — | November 20, 2011 | Haleakala | Pan-STARRS 1 | ADE | 1.3 km | MPC · JPL |
| 746505 | 2011 WW_{151} | — | August 17, 2002 | Palomar | NEAT | · | 1.1 km | MPC · JPL |
| 746506 | 2011 WZ_{151} | — | January 13, 2002 | Palomar | NEAT | · | 1.5 km | MPC · JPL |
| 746507 | 2011 WC_{152} | — | October 31, 2011 | Zelenchukskaya Stn | T. V. Krjačko, Satovski, B. | · | 2.1 km | MPC · JPL |
| 746508 | 2011 WD_{153} | — | October 23, 2011 | Haleakala | Pan-STARRS 1 | · | 1.5 km | MPC · JPL |
| 746509 | 2011 WP_{154} | — | August 29, 2006 | Catalina | CSS | · | 1.2 km | MPC · JPL |
| 746510 | 2011 WW_{156} | — | October 24, 2011 | Haleakala | Pan-STARRS 1 | · | 560 m | MPC · JPL |
| 746511 | 2011 WD_{158} | — | November 25, 2011 | Haleakala | Pan-STARRS 1 | · | 1.5 km | MPC · JPL |
| 746512 | 2011 WB_{160} | — | May 19, 2015 | Haleakala | Pan-STARRS 1 | · | 2.8 km | MPC · JPL |
| 746513 | 2011 WE_{160} | — | May 18, 2009 | Mount Lemmon | Mount Lemmon Survey | · | 1.6 km | MPC · JPL |
| 746514 | 2011 WY_{160} | — | February 9, 2008 | XuYi | PMO NEO Survey Program | · | 1.8 km | MPC · JPL |
| 746515 | 2011 WZ_{160} | — | September 23, 2015 | Haleakala | Pan-STARRS 1 | · | 1.5 km | MPC · JPL |
| 746516 | 2011 WA_{161} | — | November 24, 2011 | Haleakala | Pan-STARRS 1 | · | 510 m | MPC · JPL |
| 746517 | 2011 WN_{161} | — | June 21, 2014 | Haleakala | Pan-STARRS 1 | · | 1.1 km | MPC · JPL |
| 746518 | 2011 WS_{162} | — | November 27, 2011 | Mount Lemmon | Mount Lemmon Survey | · | 1.6 km | MPC · JPL |
| 746519 | 2011 WQ_{163} | — | November 29, 2011 | Mount Lemmon | Mount Lemmon Survey | · | 1.6 km | MPC · JPL |
| 746520 | 2011 WX_{165} | — | October 31, 2011 | Zelenchukskaya Stn | T. V. Krjačko, Satovski, B. | GAL | 1.3 km | MPC · JPL |
| 746521 | 2011 WN_{166} | — | May 24, 2014 | Haleakala | Pan-STARRS 1 | · | 900 m | MPC · JPL |
| 746522 | 2011 WS_{166} | — | November 17, 2011 | Mount Lemmon | Mount Lemmon Survey | EUN | 900 m | MPC · JPL |
| 746523 | 2011 WU_{166} | — | January 30, 2017 | Mount Lemmon | Mount Lemmon Survey | · | 1.3 km | MPC · JPL |
| 746524 | 2011 WM_{167} | — | November 18, 2011 | Mount Lemmon | Mount Lemmon Survey | PHO | 1.2 km | MPC · JPL |
| 746525 | 2011 WX_{171} | — | November 30, 2011 | Kitt Peak | Spacewatch | · | 500 m | MPC · JPL |
| 746526 | 2011 WJ_{175} | — | November 17, 2011 | Kitt Peak | Spacewatch | · | 1.9 km | MPC · JPL |
| 746527 | 2011 WO_{177} | — | November 18, 2011 | Mount Lemmon | Mount Lemmon Survey | · | 1.7 km | MPC · JPL |
| 746528 | 2011 WT_{177} | — | November 18, 2011 | Mount Lemmon | Mount Lemmon Survey | · | 1.8 km | MPC · JPL |
| 746529 | 2011 XP_{6} | — | December 1, 2011 | Mount Lemmon | Mount Lemmon Survey | KOR | 1.1 km | MPC · JPL |
| 746530 | 2011 YH_{5} | — | November 13, 2002 | Palomar | NEAT | ADE | 1.8 km | MPC · JPL |
| 746531 | 2011 YA_{6} | — | September 20, 2003 | Palomar | NEAT | · | 1.1 km | MPC · JPL |
| 746532 | 2011 YG_{18} | — | December 19, 2011 | Oukaïmeden | M. Ory | TIR | 3.3 km | MPC · JPL |
| 746533 | 2011 YS_{24} | — | December 16, 1993 | Kitt Peak | Spacewatch | · | 1.3 km | MPC · JPL |
| 746534 | 2011 YK_{25} | — | December 25, 2011 | Kitt Peak | Spacewatch | · | 1.2 km | MPC · JPL |
| 746535 | 2011 YS_{29} | — | September 14, 2006 | Palomar | NEAT | · | 1.4 km | MPC · JPL |
| 746536 | 2011 YO_{30} | — | December 25, 2011 | Mount Lemmon | Mount Lemmon Survey | · | 2.0 km | MPC · JPL |
| 746537 | 2011 YK_{31} | — | November 18, 2011 | Mount Lemmon | Mount Lemmon Survey | · | 1.7 km | MPC · JPL |
| 746538 | 2011 YS_{39} | — | December 28, 2011 | Siding Spring | SSS | H | 650 m | MPC · JPL |
| 746539 | 2011 YW_{39} | — | January 28, 2007 | Catalina | CSS | H | 540 m | MPC · JPL |
| 746540 | 2011 YX_{48} | — | November 24, 2011 | Mount Lemmon | Mount Lemmon Survey | · | 660 m | MPC · JPL |
| 746541 | 2011 YO_{49} | — | October 25, 2011 | Haleakala | Pan-STARRS 1 | EUN | 1.0 km | MPC · JPL |
| 746542 | 2011 YW_{52} | — | January 15, 2008 | Kitt Peak | Spacewatch | · | 1.4 km | MPC · JPL |
| 746543 | 2011 YJ_{53} | — | December 27, 2011 | Kitt Peak | Spacewatch | · | 1.3 km | MPC · JPL |
| 746544 | 2011 YL_{53} | — | January 16, 2003 | Palomar | NEAT | · | 1.5 km | MPC · JPL |
| 746545 | 2011 YU_{53} | — | December 27, 2011 | Mount Lemmon | Mount Lemmon Survey | · | 1.2 km | MPC · JPL |
| 746546 | 2011 YQ_{60} | — | December 25, 2011 | Kitt Peak | Spacewatch | · | 1.3 km | MPC · JPL |
| 746547 | 2011 YN_{63} | — | December 16, 2011 | Mount Lemmon | Mount Lemmon Survey | PHO | 1.0 km | MPC · JPL |
| 746548 | 2011 YL_{65} | — | December 31, 2011 | Kitt Peak | Spacewatch | · | 520 m | MPC · JPL |
| 746549 | 2011 YH_{66} | — | December 31, 2011 | Kitt Peak | Spacewatch | H | 370 m | MPC · JPL |
| 746550 | 2011 YM_{67} | — | December 31, 2011 | Kitt Peak | Spacewatch | · | 1.6 km | MPC · JPL |
| 746551 | 2011 YF_{72} | — | January 17, 2007 | Palomar | NEAT | · | 2.2 km | MPC · JPL |
| 746552 | 2011 YL_{80} | — | December 30, 2011 | Kitt Peak | Spacewatch | · | 1.8 km | MPC · JPL |
| 746553 | 2011 YP_{81} | — | August 25, 2014 | Haleakala | Pan-STARRS 1 | · | 570 m | MPC · JPL |
| 746554 | 2011 YG_{82} | — | November 19, 2014 | Haleakala | Pan-STARRS 1 | · | 780 m | MPC · JPL |
| 746555 | 2011 YQ_{82} | — | December 30, 2011 | Kitt Peak | Spacewatch | · | 1.6 km | MPC · JPL |
| 746556 | 2011 YU_{82} | — | December 30, 2011 | Kitt Peak | Spacewatch | · | 590 m | MPC · JPL |
| 746557 | 2011 YJ_{83} | — | April 11, 2013 | Kitt Peak | Spacewatch | · | 1.5 km | MPC · JPL |
| 746558 | 2011 YX_{83} | — | December 26, 2011 | Mount Lemmon | Mount Lemmon Survey | · | 1.6 km | MPC · JPL |
| 746559 | 2011 YC_{84} | — | June 3, 2013 | Mount Lemmon | Mount Lemmon Survey | EUN | 900 m | MPC · JPL |
| 746560 | 2011 YN_{84} | — | December 31, 2011 | Catalina | CSS | GAL | 1.4 km | MPC · JPL |
| 746561 | 2011 YQ_{86} | — | November 6, 2015 | Mount Lemmon | Mount Lemmon Survey | MAR | 1.1 km | MPC · JPL |
| 746562 | 2011 YE_{87} | — | December 14, 2015 | Mount Lemmon | Mount Lemmon Survey | (5) | 1.0 km | MPC · JPL |
| 746563 | 2011 YG_{87} | — | January 6, 2013 | Kitt Peak | Spacewatch | L4 | 7.3 km | MPC · JPL |
| 746564 | 2011 YW_{88} | — | September 9, 2015 | Haleakala | Pan-STARRS 1 | HOF | 2.2 km | MPC · JPL |
| 746565 | 2011 YC_{90} | — | December 29, 2011 | Mount Lemmon | Mount Lemmon Survey | · | 1.2 km | MPC · JPL |
| 746566 | 2011 YG_{90} | — | December 24, 2011 | Mount Lemmon | Mount Lemmon Survey | L4 | 9.4 km | MPC · JPL |
| 746567 | 2011 YQ_{90} | — | December 30, 2011 | Kitt Peak | Spacewatch | · | 2.8 km | MPC · JPL |
| 746568 | 2011 YG_{91} | — | December 25, 2011 | Mount Lemmon | Mount Lemmon Survey | · | 1.7 km | MPC · JPL |
| 746569 | 2011 YA_{98} | — | December 25, 2011 | Kitt Peak | Spacewatch | · | 1.4 km | MPC · JPL |
| 746570 | 2012 AL_{4} | — | January 1, 2012 | Mount Lemmon | Mount Lemmon Survey | · | 530 m | MPC · JPL |
| 746571 | 2012 AB_{8} | — | September 19, 2003 | Kitt Peak | Spacewatch | MAS | 550 m | MPC · JPL |
| 746572 | 2012 AC_{12} | — | January 2, 2012 | Mount Lemmon | Mount Lemmon Survey | JUN | 910 m | MPC · JPL |
| 746573 | 2012 AL_{19} | — | March 19, 2007 | Catalina | CSS | · | 2.7 km | MPC · JPL |
| 746574 | 2012 AT_{19} | — | December 31, 2011 | Mount Lemmon | Mount Lemmon Survey | · | 1.6 km | MPC · JPL |
| 746575 | 2012 AQ_{26} | — | February 15, 2016 | Haleakala | Pan-STARRS 1 | PHO | 910 m | MPC · JPL |
| 746576 | 2012 AT_{26} | — | July 12, 2015 | Haleakala | Pan-STARRS 1 | · | 1.8 km | MPC · JPL |
| 746577 | 2012 AX_{26} | — | January 2, 2012 | Mount Lemmon | Mount Lemmon Survey | · | 1.7 km | MPC · JPL |
| 746578 | 2012 AB_{27} | — | March 7, 2016 | Haleakala | Pan-STARRS 1 | · | 620 m | MPC · JPL |
| 746579 | 2012 AK_{27} | — | July 25, 2015 | Haleakala | Pan-STARRS 1 | · | 2.3 km | MPC · JPL |
| 746580 | 2012 AM_{27} | — | January 2, 2012 | Mount Lemmon | Mount Lemmon Survey | · | 1.8 km | MPC · JPL |
| 746581 | 2012 AV_{27} | — | January 2, 2012 | Mount Lemmon | Mount Lemmon Survey | · | 1.8 km | MPC · JPL |
| 746582 | 2012 AL_{30} | — | January 2, 2012 | Kitt Peak | Spacewatch | AST | 1.3 km | MPC · JPL |
| 746583 | 2012 AZ_{31} | — | January 3, 2012 | Mount Lemmon | Mount Lemmon Survey | L4 | 9.4 km | MPC · JPL |
| 746584 | 2012 AX_{36} | — | January 4, 2012 | Mount Lemmon | Mount Lemmon Survey | · | 640 m | MPC · JPL |
| 746585 | 2012 BU_{4} | — | August 28, 2006 | Kitt Peak | Spacewatch | · | 950 m | MPC · JPL |
| 746586 | 2012 BE_{5} | — | December 25, 2011 | Anderson Mesa | Wasserman, L. H. | · | 1.2 km | MPC · JPL |
| 746587 | 2012 BZ_{7} | — | January 18, 2012 | Mount Lemmon | Mount Lemmon Survey | L4 | 6.1 km | MPC · JPL |
| 746588 | 2012 BT_{18} | — | January 19, 2012 | Haleakala | Pan-STARRS 1 | HNS | 910 m | MPC · JPL |
| 746589 | 2012 BV_{18} | — | January 19, 2012 | Haleakala | Pan-STARRS 1 | (18466) | 1.8 km | MPC · JPL |
| 746590 | 2012 BF_{25} | — | January 23, 2012 | La Sagra | OAM | H | 510 m | MPC · JPL |
| 746591 | 2012 BZ_{26} | — | May 1, 2009 | Cerro Burek | I. de la Cueva | PHO | 790 m | MPC · JPL |
| 746592 | 2012 BA_{29} | — | September 13, 2006 | Palomar | NEAT | · | 1.3 km | MPC · JPL |
| 746593 | 2012 BG_{34} | — | January 1, 2012 | Mount Lemmon | Mount Lemmon Survey | · | 820 m | MPC · JPL |
| 746594 | 2012 BB_{40} | — | January 6, 2012 | Kitt Peak | Spacewatch | JUN | 1.1 km | MPC · JPL |
| 746595 | 2012 BU_{42} | — | December 30, 2011 | Kitt Peak | Spacewatch | · | 600 m | MPC · JPL |
| 746596 | 2012 BW_{51} | — | January 21, 2012 | Kitt Peak | Spacewatch | MAS | 580 m | MPC · JPL |
| 746597 | 2012 BV_{75} | — | January 18, 2012 | Mount Lemmon | Mount Lemmon Survey | GEF | 930 m | MPC · JPL |
| 746598 | 2012 BA_{81} | — | November 1, 2006 | Kitt Peak | Spacewatch | · | 1.1 km | MPC · JPL |
| 746599 | 2012 BT_{82} | — | January 27, 2012 | Mount Lemmon | Mount Lemmon Survey | KOR | 1.2 km | MPC · JPL |
| 746600 | 2012 BX_{84} | — | January 27, 2012 | Mount Lemmon | Mount Lemmon Survey | · | 2.4 km | MPC · JPL |

== 746601–746700 ==
back to top

| Designation | | | Discovery | | | Properties | | Ref |
| Permanent | Provisional | Named after | Date | Site | Discoverer(s) | Category | Diam. | Ref |
|---|---|---|---|---|---|---|---|---|
| 746601 | 2012 BK_{90} | — | January 19, 2012 | Haleakala | Pan-STARRS 1 | · | 1.7 km | MPC · JPL |
| 746602 | 2012 BA_{92} | — | January 4, 2012 | Mount Lemmon | Mount Lemmon Survey | · | 2.1 km | MPC · JPL |
| 746603 | 2012 BN_{99} | — | January 26, 2012 | Haleakala | Pan-STARRS 1 | · | 1.0 km | MPC · JPL |
| 746604 | 2012 BF_{101} | — | January 19, 2012 | Haleakala | Pan-STARRS 1 | · | 1.7 km | MPC · JPL |
| 746605 | 2012 BC_{103} | — | January 19, 2012 | Kitt Peak | Spacewatch | · | 1.6 km | MPC · JPL |
| 746606 | 2012 BS_{103} | — | January 19, 2012 | Haleakala | Pan-STARRS 1 | · | 2.8 km | MPC · JPL |
| 746607 | 2012 BZ_{103} | — | December 31, 2011 | Kitt Peak | Spacewatch | · | 1.3 km | MPC · JPL |
| 746608 | 2012 BA_{104} | — | January 20, 2012 | Kitt Peak | Spacewatch | · | 2.5 km | MPC · JPL |
| 746609 | 2012 BK_{104} | — | January 3, 2012 | Mount Lemmon | Mount Lemmon Survey | · | 1.5 km | MPC · JPL |
| 746610 | 2012 BC_{105} | — | January 17, 2012 | Marly | Kocher, F. | H | 450 m | MPC · JPL |
| 746611 | 2012 BV_{106} | — | September 19, 2006 | Catalina | CSS | · | 1.3 km | MPC · JPL |
| 746612 | 2012 BK_{109} | — | January 27, 2012 | Kitt Peak | Spacewatch | · | 2.1 km | MPC · JPL |
| 746613 | 2012 BL_{110} | — | January 27, 2012 | Kitt Peak | Spacewatch | MAS | 520 m | MPC · JPL |
| 746614 | 2012 BA_{118} | — | January 27, 2012 | Mount Lemmon | Mount Lemmon Survey | · | 1.7 km | MPC · JPL |
| 746615 | 2012 BC_{127} | — | January 2, 2012 | Mount Lemmon | Mount Lemmon Survey | · | 1.0 km | MPC · JPL |
| 746616 | 2012 BT_{129} | — | January 27, 2012 | Mount Lemmon | Mount Lemmon Survey | · | 1.6 km | MPC · JPL |
| 746617 | 2012 BW_{130} | — | January 30, 2012 | Mount Lemmon | Mount Lemmon Survey | H | 560 m | MPC · JPL |
| 746618 | 2012 BT_{131} | — | December 30, 2000 | Socorro | LINEAR | T_{j} (2.96) | 2.9 km | MPC · JPL |
| 746619 | 2012 BC_{132} | — | January 17, 2007 | Mount Lemmon | Mount Lemmon Survey | · | 1.9 km | MPC · JPL |
| 746620 | 2012 BG_{134} | — | July 30, 2005 | Palomar | NEAT | H | 570 m | MPC · JPL |
| 746621 | 2012 BR_{134} | — | January 20, 2012 | Haleakala | Pan-STARRS 1 | H | 470 m | MPC · JPL |
| 746622 | 2012 BT_{135} | — | January 4, 2012 | Kitt Peak | Spacewatch | · | 2.2 km | MPC · JPL |
| 746623 | 2012 BL_{146} | — | January 27, 2012 | Mount Lemmon | Mount Lemmon Survey | · | 1.4 km | MPC · JPL |
| 746624 | 2012 BY_{147} | — | January 27, 2012 | Mount Lemmon | Mount Lemmon Survey | · | 1.7 km | MPC · JPL |
| 746625 | 2012 BE_{149} | — | December 31, 2007 | Lulin | LUSS | · | 1.1 km | MPC · JPL |
| 746626 | 2012 BG_{151} | — | November 27, 2006 | Mount Lemmon | Mount Lemmon Survey | · | 1.9 km | MPC · JPL |
| 746627 | 2012 BG_{156} | — | January 8, 2006 | Mount Lemmon | Mount Lemmon Survey | · | 3.4 km | MPC · JPL |
| 746628 | 2012 BN_{156} | — | January 19, 2012 | Kitt Peak | Spacewatch | · | 1.5 km | MPC · JPL |
| 746629 | 2012 BY_{159} | — | January 26, 2012 | Haleakala | Pan-STARRS 1 | · | 600 m | MPC · JPL |
| 746630 | 2012 BD_{160} | — | January 20, 2012 | Kitt Peak | Spacewatch | · | 720 m | MPC · JPL |
| 746631 | 2012 BO_{160} | — | January 18, 2015 | Haleakala | Pan-STARRS 1 | · | 570 m | MPC · JPL |
| 746632 | 2012 BV_{160} | — | January 19, 2012 | Haleakala | Pan-STARRS 1 | SYL | 3.1 km | MPC · JPL |
| 746633 | 2012 BH_{161} | — | January 18, 2012 | Mount Lemmon | Mount Lemmon Survey | · | 1.4 km | MPC · JPL |
| 746634 | 2012 BT_{161} | — | January 22, 2012 | Haleakala | Pan-STARRS 1 | · | 1.3 km | MPC · JPL |
| 746635 | 2012 BC_{162} | — | January 20, 2012 | Mount Lemmon | Mount Lemmon Survey | · | 850 m | MPC · JPL |
| 746636 | 2012 BL_{162} | — | January 26, 2012 | Mount Lemmon | Mount Lemmon Survey | · | 1.5 km | MPC · JPL |
| 746637 | 2012 BA_{163} | — | January 26, 2012 | Haleakala | Pan-STARRS 1 | · | 1.5 km | MPC · JPL |
| 746638 | 2012 BW_{163} | — | July 13, 2013 | Haleakala | Pan-STARRS 1 | PHO | 610 m | MPC · JPL |
| 746639 | 2012 BY_{163} | — | January 27, 2012 | Mount Lemmon | Mount Lemmon Survey | · | 1.6 km | MPC · JPL |
| 746640 | 2012 BR_{166} | — | June 27, 2014 | Haleakala | Pan-STARRS 1 | · | 1.7 km | MPC · JPL |
| 746641 | 2012 BX_{166} | — | January 30, 2012 | Mount Lemmon | Mount Lemmon Survey | · | 1.6 km | MPC · JPL |
| 746642 | 2012 BR_{167} | — | January 27, 2012 | Mount Lemmon | Mount Lemmon Survey | · | 1.8 km | MPC · JPL |
| 746643 | 2012 BV_{167} | — | January 2, 2016 | Kitt Peak | Spacewatch | · | 1.2 km | MPC · JPL |
| 746644 | 2012 BJ_{169} | — | December 14, 2015 | Haleakala | Pan-STARRS 1 | · | 1.4 km | MPC · JPL |
| 746645 | 2012 BP_{169} | — | January 31, 2017 | Haleakala | Pan-STARRS 1 | GAL | 1.5 km | MPC · JPL |
| 746646 | 2012 BD_{171} | — | October 10, 2015 | Haleakala | Pan-STARRS 1 | · | 1.4 km | MPC · JPL |
| 746647 | 2012 BL_{171} | — | March 31, 2016 | Haleakala | Pan-STARRS 1 | · | 800 m | MPC · JPL |
| 746648 | 2012 BG_{177} | — | January 29, 2012 | Mount Lemmon | Mount Lemmon Survey | · | 1.6 km | MPC · JPL |
| 746649 | 2012 BQ_{183} | — | January 18, 2012 | Mount Lemmon | Mount Lemmon Survey | TIR | 2.0 km | MPC · JPL |
| 746650 | 2012 BC_{184} | — | January 18, 2012 | Mount Lemmon | Mount Lemmon Survey | · | 2.4 km | MPC · JPL |
| 746651 | 2012 CJ_{2} | — | January 31, 2012 | Kitt Peak | Spacewatch | MAS | 630 m | MPC · JPL |
| 746652 | 2012 CB_{15} | — | January 18, 2012 | Kitt Peak | Spacewatch | EOS | 1.9 km | MPC · JPL |
| 746653 | 2012 CS_{19} | — | February 12, 2012 | Mount Lemmon | Mount Lemmon Survey | · | 1.2 km | MPC · JPL |
| 746654 | 2012 CV_{19} | — | February 12, 2012 | Mount Lemmon | Mount Lemmon Survey | · | 580 m | MPC · JPL |
| 746655 | 2012 CF_{26} | — | April 21, 2004 | Kitt Peak | Spacewatch | · | 1.4 km | MPC · JPL |
| 746656 | 2012 CS_{28} | — | January 19, 2012 | Haleakala | Pan-STARRS 1 | · | 690 m | MPC · JPL |
| 746657 | 2012 CG_{32} | — | March 9, 2007 | Mount Lemmon | Mount Lemmon Survey | EMA | 2.3 km | MPC · JPL |
| 746658 | 2012 CM_{35} | — | January 18, 2012 | Kitt Peak | Spacewatch | · | 2.0 km | MPC · JPL |
| 746659 | 2012 CV_{41} | — | February 4, 2012 | Haleakala | Pan-STARRS 1 | · | 530 m | MPC · JPL |
| 746660 | 2012 CQ_{42} | — | January 21, 2012 | Kitt Peak | Spacewatch | H | 370 m | MPC · JPL |
| 746661 | 2012 CT_{43} | — | January 27, 2012 | Mount Lemmon | Mount Lemmon Survey | · | 2.4 km | MPC · JPL |
| 746662 | 2012 CQ_{48} | — | January 29, 2012 | Mount Lemmon | Mount Lemmon Survey | · | 1.4 km | MPC · JPL |
| 746663 | 2012 CS_{48} | — | September 11, 2005 | Kitt Peak | Spacewatch | · | 1.8 km | MPC · JPL |
| 746664 | 2012 CE_{49} | — | February 13, 2012 | Haleakala | Pan-STARRS 1 | · | 1.9 km | MPC · JPL |
| 746665 | 2012 CS_{50} | — | January 19, 2012 | Haleakala | Pan-STARRS 1 | · | 1.3 km | MPC · JPL |
| 746666 | 2012 CC_{54} | — | January 29, 2012 | Kitt Peak | Spacewatch | CLA | 1.3 km | MPC · JPL |
| 746667 | 2012 CQ_{59} | — | February 14, 2012 | Haleakala | Pan-STARRS 1 | · | 570 m | MPC · JPL |
| 746668 | 2012 CY_{59} | — | February 11, 2016 | Haleakala | Pan-STARRS 1 | · | 800 m | MPC · JPL |
| 746669 | 2012 CF_{60} | — | August 8, 2013 | Kitt Peak | Spacewatch | · | 810 m | MPC · JPL |
| 746670 | 2012 CN_{60} | — | August 28, 2014 | Haleakala | Pan-STARRS 1 | NEM | 1.8 km | MPC · JPL |
| 746671 | 2012 CQ_{60} | — | February 1, 2012 | Kitt Peak | Spacewatch | · | 770 m | MPC · JPL |
| 746672 | 2012 CU_{60} | — | January 31, 2017 | Mount Lemmon | Mount Lemmon Survey | · | 1.8 km | MPC · JPL |
| 746673 | 2012 CW_{60} | — | November 26, 2014 | Haleakala | Pan-STARRS 1 | V | 500 m | MPC · JPL |
| 746674 | 2012 CX_{60} | — | February 1, 2012 | Kitt Peak | Spacewatch | · | 520 m | MPC · JPL |
| 746675 | 2012 CA_{61} | — | December 14, 2015 | Mount Lemmon | Mount Lemmon Survey | EOS | 1.6 km | MPC · JPL |
| 746676 | 2012 CK_{61} | — | December 10, 2015 | Mount Lemmon | Mount Lemmon Survey | EUN | 980 m | MPC · JPL |
| 746677 | 2012 CB_{63} | — | February 14, 2012 | Haleakala | Pan-STARRS 1 | · | 1.4 km | MPC · JPL |
| 746678 | 2012 CC_{63} | — | July 25, 2014 | Haleakala | Pan-STARRS 1 | · | 1.6 km | MPC · JPL |
| 746679 | 2012 CE_{63} | — | December 31, 2015 | Haleakala | Pan-STARRS 1 | EUN | 1.0 km | MPC · JPL |
| 746680 | 2012 CJ_{63} | — | August 28, 2014 | Haleakala | Pan-STARRS 1 | · | 1.6 km | MPC · JPL |
| 746681 | 2012 CM_{63} | — | September 19, 2014 | Haleakala | Pan-STARRS 1 | MRX | 820 m | MPC · JPL |
| 746682 | 2012 CO_{64} | — | August 15, 2014 | Haleakala | Pan-STARRS 1 | · | 1.5 km | MPC · JPL |
| 746683 | 2012 CE_{65} | — | March 6, 2016 | Haleakala | Pan-STARRS 1 | NYS | 730 m | MPC · JPL |
| 746684 | 2012 CF_{68} | — | February 4, 2012 | Haleakala | Pan-STARRS 1 | · | 2.3 km | MPC · JPL |
| 746685 | 2012 CA_{69} | — | February 14, 2012 | Haleakala | Pan-STARRS 1 | KOR | 940 m | MPC · JPL |
| 746686 | 2012 DE_{1} | — | February 16, 2012 | Haleakala | Pan-STARRS 1 | · | 1.6 km | MPC · JPL |
| 746687 | 2012 DJ_{1} | — | January 19, 2012 | Haleakala | Pan-STARRS 1 | · | 1.2 km | MPC · JPL |
| 746688 | 2012 DX_{3} | — | January 24, 2012 | Tenerife | ESA OGS | H | 460 m | MPC · JPL |
| 746689 | 2012 DW_{4} | — | September 13, 2007 | Mount Lemmon | Mount Lemmon Survey | · | 500 m | MPC · JPL |
| 746690 | 2012 DX_{4} | — | February 16, 2001 | Kitt Peak | Spacewatch | · | 2.1 km | MPC · JPL |
| 746691 | 2012 DJ_{7} | — | August 31, 2005 | Kitt Peak | Spacewatch | · | 2.0 km | MPC · JPL |
| 746692 | 2012 DU_{10} | — | February 16, 2012 | Haleakala | Pan-STARRS 1 | · | 1.9 km | MPC · JPL |
| 746693 | 2012 DP_{14} | — | January 22, 2012 | Haleakala | Pan-STARRS 1 | H | 500 m | MPC · JPL |
| 746694 | 2012 DA_{16} | — | April 11, 2005 | Mount Lemmon | Mount Lemmon Survey | · | 920 m | MPC · JPL |
| 746695 | 2012 DS_{17} | — | February 22, 2012 | Kitt Peak | Spacewatch | H | 400 m | MPC · JPL |
| 746696 | 2012 DY_{18} | — | February 21, 2012 | Kitt Peak | Spacewatch | H | 450 m | MPC · JPL |
| 746697 | 2012 DB_{19} | — | February 23, 2012 | Catalina | CSS | · | 1.6 km | MPC · JPL |
| 746698 | 2012 DT_{19} | — | February 23, 2012 | Kitt Peak | Spacewatch | · | 1.3 km | MPC · JPL |
| 746699 | 2012 DK_{21} | — | February 19, 2012 | Kitt Peak | Spacewatch | · | 790 m | MPC · JPL |
| 746700 | 2012 DO_{26} | — | February 13, 2012 | Haleakala | Pan-STARRS 1 | ADE | 1.6 km | MPC · JPL |

== 746701–746800 ==
back to top

| Designation | | | Discovery | | | Properties | | Ref |
| Permanent | Provisional | Named after | Date | Site | Discoverer(s) | Category | Diam. | Ref |
|---|---|---|---|---|---|---|---|---|
| 746701 | 2012 DB_{28} | — | February 23, 2012 | Mount Lemmon | Mount Lemmon Survey | · | 1.6 km | MPC · JPL |
| 746702 | 2012 DR_{34} | — | August 10, 2007 | Kitt Peak | Spacewatch | · | 540 m | MPC · JPL |
| 746703 | 2012 DC_{36} | — | February 24, 2012 | Kitt Peak | Spacewatch | PHO | 940 m | MPC · JPL |
| 746704 | 2012 DH_{36} | — | March 20, 2007 | Catalina | CSS | H | 450 m | MPC · JPL |
| 746705 | 2012 DA_{40} | — | February 24, 2012 | Kitt Peak | Spacewatch | H | 480 m | MPC · JPL |
| 746706 | 2012 DQ_{42} | — | February 21, 2007 | Kitt Peak | Spacewatch | · | 1.2 km | MPC · JPL |
| 746707 | 2012 DJ_{45} | — | February 25, 2012 | Kitt Peak | Spacewatch | NYS | 980 m | MPC · JPL |
| 746708 | 2012 DY_{47} | — | January 20, 2012 | Haleakala | Pan-STARRS 1 | H | 440 m | MPC · JPL |
| 746709 | 2012 DC_{49} | — | January 19, 2012 | Haleakala | Pan-STARRS 1 | · | 1.5 km | MPC · JPL |
| 746710 | 2012 DB_{51} | — | February 26, 2012 | Kitt Peak | Spacewatch | (2076) | 600 m | MPC · JPL |
| 746711 | 2012 DP_{55} | — | February 24, 2012 | Haleakala | Pan-STARRS 1 | · | 1.8 km | MPC · JPL |
| 746712 | 2012 DW_{56} | — | February 25, 2012 | Mount Lemmon | Mount Lemmon Survey | · | 1.4 km | MPC · JPL |
| 746713 | 2012 DY_{61} | — | February 24, 2012 | Haleakala | Pan-STARRS 1 | · | 1.7 km | MPC · JPL |
| 746714 | 2012 DD_{62} | — | February 26, 2012 | Haleakala | Pan-STARRS 1 | · | 2.7 km | MPC · JPL |
| 746715 | 2012 DC_{67} | — | October 11, 2010 | Mount Lemmon | Mount Lemmon Survey | · | 1.3 km | MPC · JPL |
| 746716 | 2012 DO_{72} | — | January 19, 2012 | Haleakala | Pan-STARRS 1 | · | 790 m | MPC · JPL |
| 746717 | 2012 DN_{74} | — | February 27, 2012 | Haleakala | Pan-STARRS 1 | MAR | 910 m | MPC · JPL |
| 746718 | 2012 DQ_{76} | — | February 29, 2012 | Catalina | CSS | H | 510 m | MPC · JPL |
| 746719 | 2012 DH_{86} | — | January 14, 2008 | Kitt Peak | Spacewatch | · | 900 m | MPC · JPL |
| 746720 | 2012 DR_{86} | — | February 27, 2012 | Catalina | CSS | · | 2.6 km | MPC · JPL |
| 746721 | 2012 DT_{86} | — | February 21, 2012 | Mount Lemmon | Mount Lemmon Survey | PHO | 620 m | MPC · JPL |
| 746722 | 2012 DF_{98} | — | February 19, 2012 | Kitt Peak | Spacewatch | PHO | 820 m | MPC · JPL |
| 746723 | 2012 DR_{99} | — | February 27, 2012 | Haleakala | Pan-STARRS 1 | H | 440 m | MPC · JPL |
| 746724 | 2012 DH_{101} | — | February 27, 2012 | Haleakala | Pan-STARRS 1 | · | 1.4 km | MPC · JPL |
| 746725 | 2012 DK_{101} | — | October 16, 2009 | Mount Lemmon | Mount Lemmon Survey | · | 1.3 km | MPC · JPL |
| 746726 | 2012 DY_{106} | — | June 18, 2013 | Mount Lemmon | Mount Lemmon Survey | V | 530 m | MPC · JPL |
| 746727 | 2012 DF_{107} | — | February 23, 2012 | Kitt Peak | Spacewatch | · | 1.5 km | MPC · JPL |
| 746728 | 2012 DG_{108} | — | February 19, 2012 | Kitt Peak | Spacewatch | · | 3.0 km | MPC · JPL |
| 746729 | 2012 DJ_{108} | — | January 4, 2016 | Haleakala | Pan-STARRS 1 | · | 1.5 km | MPC · JPL |
| 746730 | 2012 DU_{108} | — | February 26, 2012 | Haleakala | Pan-STARRS 1 | · | 1.9 km | MPC · JPL |
| 746731 | 2012 DL_{109} | — | February 16, 2012 | Haleakala | Pan-STARRS 1 | · | 550 m | MPC · JPL |
| 746732 | 2012 DS_{110} | — | February 16, 2012 | Haleakala | Pan-STARRS 1 | · | 860 m | MPC · JPL |
| 746733 | 2012 DU_{111} | — | July 5, 2016 | Haleakala | Pan-STARRS 1 | · | 590 m | MPC · JPL |
| 746734 | 2012 DW_{111} | — | February 28, 2012 | Haleakala | Pan-STARRS 1 | · | 1.8 km | MPC · JPL |
| 746735 | 2012 DA_{112} | — | April 13, 2013 | Haleakala | Pan-STARRS 1 | · | 1.6 km | MPC · JPL |
| 746736 | 2012 DH_{112} | — | July 31, 2014 | Haleakala | Pan-STARRS 1 | · | 2.0 km | MPC · JPL |
| 746737 | 2012 DF_{114} | — | February 28, 2012 | Haleakala | Pan-STARRS 1 | · | 2.4 km | MPC · JPL |
| 746738 | 2012 DP_{114} | — | September 10, 2013 | Haleakala | Pan-STARRS 1 | · | 880 m | MPC · JPL |
| 746739 | 2012 DG_{115} | — | February 20, 2012 | Kitt Peak | Spacewatch | · | 2.4 km | MPC · JPL |
| 746740 | 2012 DV_{117} | — | February 25, 2012 | Mount Lemmon | Mount Lemmon Survey | · | 740 m | MPC · JPL |
| 746741 | 2012 DE_{118} | — | February 16, 2012 | Haleakala | Pan-STARRS 1 | · | 810 m | MPC · JPL |
| 746742 | 2012 DR_{127} | — | February 19, 2012 | Catalina | CSS | · | 2.4 km | MPC · JPL |
| 746743 | 2012 EG_{2} | — | March 1, 2012 | Mount Lemmon | Mount Lemmon Survey | · | 1.7 km | MPC · JPL |
| 746744 | 2012 EJ_{3} | — | January 18, 2012 | Mount Lemmon | Mount Lemmon Survey | · | 1.8 km | MPC · JPL |
| 746745 | 2012 EH_{10} | — | February 27, 2012 | Haleakala | Pan-STARRS 1 | H | 370 m | MPC · JPL |
| 746746 | 2012 EV_{11} | — | February 26, 2012 | Catalina | CSS | PHO | 850 m | MPC · JPL |
| 746747 | 2012 ET_{12} | — | February 24, 2012 | Haleakala | Pan-STARRS 1 | · | 1.3 km | MPC · JPL |
| 746748 | 2012 EH_{14} | — | September 13, 2002 | Palomar | NEAT | H | 460 m | MPC · JPL |
| 746749 | 2012 EF_{15} | — | February 19, 2012 | Kitt Peak | Spacewatch | H | 420 m | MPC · JPL |
| 746750 | 2012 EM_{17} | — | March 18, 2012 | Piszkés-tető | K. Sárneczky, A. Szing | H | 440 m | MPC · JPL |
| 746751 | 2012 EH_{20} | — | March 1, 2012 | Mount Lemmon | Mount Lemmon Survey | · | 780 m | MPC · JPL |
| 746752 | 2012 EJ_{20} | — | December 21, 2014 | Haleakala | Pan-STARRS 1 | · | 940 m | MPC · JPL |
| 746753 | 2012 EK_{20} | — | March 16, 2012 | Piszkés-tető | K. Sárneczky, S. Kürti | · | 960 m | MPC · JPL |
| 746754 | 2012 EW_{20} | — | June 28, 2014 | Haleakala | Pan-STARRS 1 | · | 2.3 km | MPC · JPL |
| 746755 | 2012 EA_{21} | — | March 15, 2012 | Kitt Peak | Spacewatch | · | 2.7 km | MPC · JPL |
| 746756 | 2012 EE_{21} | — | March 14, 2012 | Haleakala | Pan-STARRS 1 | · | 2.0 km | MPC · JPL |
| 746757 | 2012 EQ_{22} | — | October 25, 2014 | Haleakala | Pan-STARRS 1 | · | 830 m | MPC · JPL |
| 746758 | 2012 ER_{26} | — | March 15, 2012 | Mount Lemmon | Mount Lemmon Survey | PHO | 740 m | MPC · JPL |
| 746759 | 2012 ES_{28} | — | March 15, 2012 | Catalina | CSS | · | 3.6 km | MPC · JPL |
| 746760 | 2012 ED_{32} | — | March 15, 2012 | Kitt Peak | Spacewatch | · | 1.9 km | MPC · JPL |
| 746761 | 2012 FK | — | July 29, 2005 | Palomar | NEAT | H | 640 m | MPC · JPL |
| 746762 | 2012 FG_{3} | — | August 23, 2009 | Bergisch Gladbach | W. Bickel | · | 1.5 km | MPC · JPL |
| 746763 | 2012 FA_{6} | — | January 19, 2012 | Haleakala | Pan-STARRS 1 | · | 2.6 km | MPC · JPL |
| 746764 | 2012 FD_{7} | — | February 1, 2012 | Kitt Peak | Spacewatch | · | 1.4 km | MPC · JPL |
| 746765 | 2012 FT_{9} | — | March 16, 2012 | Haleakala | Pan-STARRS 1 | BRA | 1.1 km | MPC · JPL |
| 746766 | 2012 FE_{10} | — | March 9, 2007 | Catalina | CSS | · | 1.2 km | MPC · JPL |
| 746767 | 2012 FE_{11} | — | September 4, 2010 | Mount Lemmon | Mount Lemmon Survey | H | 550 m | MPC · JPL |
| 746768 | 2012 FW_{12} | — | February 27, 2012 | Haleakala | Pan-STARRS 1 | · | 950 m | MPC · JPL |
| 746769 | 2012 FJ_{24} | — | February 26, 2012 | Haleakala | Pan-STARRS 1 | · | 720 m | MPC · JPL |
| 746770 | 2012 FT_{28} | — | August 20, 2006 | Palomar | NEAT | PHO | 950 m | MPC · JPL |
| 746771 | 2012 FC_{30} | — | February 22, 2012 | Catalina | CSS | · | 1.7 km | MPC · JPL |
| 746772 | 2012 FY_{30} | — | March 21, 2012 | Mount Lemmon | Mount Lemmon Survey | H | 540 m | MPC · JPL |
| 746773 | 2012 FT_{33} | — | March 26, 2007 | Mount Lemmon | Mount Lemmon Survey | · | 1.5 km | MPC · JPL |
| 746774 | 2012 FB_{37} | — | March 25, 2012 | Mount Lemmon | Mount Lemmon Survey | · | 1.7 km | MPC · JPL |
| 746775 | 2012 FT_{37} | — | February 28, 2012 | Haleakala | Pan-STARRS 1 | · | 1.2 km | MPC · JPL |
| 746776 | 2012 FX_{37} | — | December 4, 2007 | Mount Lemmon | Mount Lemmon Survey | · | 590 m | MPC · JPL |
| 746777 | 2012 FF_{39} | — | March 4, 2012 | Mount Lemmon | Mount Lemmon Survey | · | 540 m | MPC · JPL |
| 746778 | 2012 FQ_{43} | — | March 14, 2012 | Haleakala | Pan-STARRS 1 | H | 450 m | MPC · JPL |
| 746779 | 2012 FO_{44} | — | November 27, 2010 | Mount Lemmon | Mount Lemmon Survey | DOR | 2.1 km | MPC · JPL |
| 746780 | 2012 FE_{45} | — | March 21, 2012 | Mount Lemmon | Mount Lemmon Survey | · | 550 m | MPC · JPL |
| 746781 | 2012 FB_{48} | — | October 29, 2010 | Mount Lemmon | Mount Lemmon Survey | · | 2.0 km | MPC · JPL |
| 746782 | 2012 FS_{54} | — | March 24, 2012 | Mount Lemmon | Mount Lemmon Survey | · | 1.9 km | MPC · JPL |
| 746783 | 2012 FX_{55} | — | May 6, 2003 | Kitt Peak | Spacewatch | · | 1.9 km | MPC · JPL |
| 746784 | 2012 FU_{58} | — | March 24, 2012 | Catalina | CSS | · | 2.3 km | MPC · JPL |
| 746785 | 2012 FB_{59} | — | March 27, 2012 | Bergisch Gladbach | W. Bickel | · | 2.0 km | MPC · JPL |
| 746786 | 2012 FT_{61} | — | December 11, 2006 | Kitt Peak | Spacewatch | · | 1.6 km | MPC · JPL |
| 746787 | 2012 FW_{62} | — | March 29, 2012 | Haleakala | Pan-STARRS 1 | H | 390 m | MPC · JPL |
| 746788 | 2012 FX_{71} | — | March 29, 2012 | Haleakala | Pan-STARRS 1 | · | 2.2 km | MPC · JPL |
| 746789 | 2012 FN_{72} | — | March 13, 2012 | Catalina | CSS | · | 2.9 km | MPC · JPL |
| 746790 | 2012 FK_{75} | — | March 16, 2012 | Haleakala | Pan-STARRS 1 | · | 620 m | MPC · JPL |
| 746791 | 2012 FO_{76} | — | February 28, 2012 | Haleakala | Pan-STARRS 1 | · | 1.7 km | MPC · JPL |
| 746792 | 2012 FN_{80} | — | March 27, 2012 | Piszkéstető | K. Sárneczky | · | 1.5 km | MPC · JPL |
| 746793 | 2012 FJ_{85} | — | March 29, 2012 | Kitt Peak | Spacewatch | MRX | 870 m | MPC · JPL |
| 746794 | 2012 FX_{85} | — | March 24, 2012 | Kitt Peak | Spacewatch | · | 1.9 km | MPC · JPL |
| 746795 | 2012 FC_{87} | — | March 16, 2012 | Kitt Peak | Spacewatch | · | 1.5 km | MPC · JPL |
| 746796 | 2012 FO_{87} | — | September 11, 2006 | Sacramento Peak | SDSS Collaboration | · | 1.0 km | MPC · JPL |
| 746797 | 2012 FF_{88} | — | March 27, 2012 | Mount Lemmon | Mount Lemmon Survey | (1547) | 1.5 km | MPC · JPL |
| 746798 | 2012 FG_{88} | — | March 25, 2012 | Mount Lemmon | Mount Lemmon Survey | · | 1.7 km | MPC · JPL |
| 746799 | 2012 FH_{88} | — | November 2, 2015 | Haleakala | Pan-STARRS 1 | · | 1.8 km | MPC · JPL |
| 746800 | 2012 FM_{88} | — | February 10, 2016 | Haleakala | Pan-STARRS 1 | · | 890 m | MPC · JPL |

== 746801–746900 ==
back to top

| Designation | | | Discovery | | | Properties | | Ref |
| Permanent | Provisional | Named after | Date | Site | Discoverer(s) | Category | Diam. | Ref |
|---|---|---|---|---|---|---|---|---|
| 746801 | 2012 FZ_{88} | — | September 2, 2014 | Haleakala | Pan-STARRS 1 | EOS | 1.6 km | MPC · JPL |
| 746802 | 2012 FA_{89} | — | December 6, 2015 | Haleakala | Pan-STARRS 1 | EMA | 2.3 km | MPC · JPL |
| 746803 | 2012 FC_{90} | — | October 3, 2013 | Haleakala | Pan-STARRS 1 | NYS | 970 m | MPC · JPL |
| 746804 | 2012 FF_{90} | — | March 28, 2012 | Mount Lemmon | Mount Lemmon Survey | · | 960 m | MPC · JPL |
| 746805 | 2012 FL_{90} | — | July 2, 2013 | Haleakala | Pan-STARRS 1 | · | 1.3 km | MPC · JPL |
| 746806 | 2012 FN_{90} | — | July 12, 2013 | Haleakala | Pan-STARRS 1 | EOS | 1.6 km | MPC · JPL |
| 746807 | 2012 FJ_{93} | — | March 28, 2012 | Mount Lemmon | Mount Lemmon Survey | EOS | 1.6 km | MPC · JPL |
| 746808 | 2012 FL_{93} | — | September 19, 2014 | Haleakala | Pan-STARRS 1 | · | 1.8 km | MPC · JPL |
| 746809 | 2012 FV_{93} | — | March 16, 2012 | Mount Lemmon | Mount Lemmon Survey | · | 800 m | MPC · JPL |
| 746810 | 2012 FW_{93} | — | September 19, 2014 | Haleakala | Pan-STARRS 1 | NAE | 2.2 km | MPC · JPL |
| 746811 | 2012 FT_{94} | — | June 30, 2013 | Haleakala | Pan-STARRS 1 | · | 2.0 km | MPC · JPL |
| 746812 | 2012 FV_{94} | — | March 28, 2012 | Mount Lemmon | Mount Lemmon Survey | · | 1.6 km | MPC · JPL |
| 746813 | 2012 FX_{94} | — | March 16, 2012 | Mount Lemmon | Mount Lemmon Survey | · | 800 m | MPC · JPL |
| 746814 | 2012 FH_{95} | — | August 12, 2013 | Haleakala | Pan-STARRS 1 | · | 920 m | MPC · JPL |
| 746815 | 2012 FH_{96} | — | August 22, 2014 | Haleakala | Pan-STARRS 1 | · | 2.1 km | MPC · JPL |
| 746816 | 2012 FD_{98} | — | January 26, 2017 | Haleakala | Pan-STARRS 1 | · | 1.7 km | MPC · JPL |
| 746817 | 2012 FZ_{98} | — | March 29, 2012 | Haleakala | Pan-STARRS 1 | BRA | 1.1 km | MPC · JPL |
| 746818 | 2012 FD_{101} | — | March 25, 2012 | Mount Lemmon | Mount Lemmon Survey | V | 520 m | MPC · JPL |
| 746819 | 2012 FH_{101} | — | March 31, 2012 | Mount Lemmon | Mount Lemmon Survey | MAS | 550 m | MPC · JPL |
| 746820 | 2012 FU_{103} | — | March 16, 2012 | Haleakala | Pan-STARRS 1 | · | 630 m | MPC · JPL |
| 746821 | 2012 FO_{112} | — | March 23, 2012 | Mount Lemmon | Mount Lemmon Survey | EOS | 1.4 km | MPC · JPL |
| 746822 | 2012 FP_{116} | — | March 29, 2012 | Mount Lemmon | Mount Lemmon Survey | TIR | 1.9 km | MPC · JPL |
| 746823 | 2012 GG_{2} | — | February 22, 2012 | Catalina | CSS | · | 3.2 km | MPC · JPL |
| 746824 | 2012 GF_{7} | — | April 13, 2012 | Kitt Peak | Spacewatch | · | 940 m | MPC · JPL |
| 746825 | 2012 GG_{10} | — | April 1, 2012 | Mount Lemmon | Mount Lemmon Survey | · | 850 m | MPC · JPL |
| 746826 | 2012 GA_{15} | — | April 13, 2012 | Haleakala | Pan-STARRS 1 | EOS | 1.4 km | MPC · JPL |
| 746827 | 2012 GO_{16} | — | April 15, 2012 | Haleakala | Pan-STARRS 1 | EOS | 1.5 km | MPC · JPL |
| 746828 | 2012 GY_{16} | — | April 15, 2012 | Haleakala | Pan-STARRS 1 | H | 410 m | MPC · JPL |
| 746829 | 2012 GY_{18} | — | March 28, 2012 | Kitt Peak | Spacewatch | · | 1.8 km | MPC · JPL |
| 746830 | 2012 GO_{19} | — | April 13, 2012 | Haleakala | Pan-STARRS 1 | · | 2.2 km | MPC · JPL |
| 746831 | 2012 GF_{21} | — | January 30, 2012 | Haleakala | Pan-STARRS 1 | EUP | 2.8 km | MPC · JPL |
| 746832 | 2012 GK_{21} | — | March 10, 2002 | Palomar | NEAT | · | 1.6 km | MPC · JPL |
| 746833 | 2012 GV_{22} | — | March 27, 2012 | Mount Lemmon | Mount Lemmon Survey | · | 2.4 km | MPC · JPL |
| 746834 | 2012 GR_{30} | — | April 12, 2012 | Haleakala | Pan-STARRS 1 | · | 740 m | MPC · JPL |
| 746835 | 2012 GO_{35} | — | March 15, 2012 | Kitt Peak | Spacewatch | · | 1.0 km | MPC · JPL |
| 746836 | 2012 GK_{42} | — | April 15, 2012 | Haleakala | Pan-STARRS 1 | EOS | 1.5 km | MPC · JPL |
| 746837 | 2012 GP_{42} | — | April 1, 2012 | Mount Lemmon | Mount Lemmon Survey | PHO | 710 m | MPC · JPL |
| 746838 | 2012 GQ_{42} | — | August 28, 2014 | Haleakala | Pan-STARRS 1 | EOS | 1.7 km | MPC · JPL |
| 746839 | 2012 GJ_{44} | — | January 29, 2017 | Mount Lemmon | Mount Lemmon Survey | · | 2.5 km | MPC · JPL |
| 746840 | 2012 GL_{44} | — | October 5, 2014 | Mount Lemmon | Mount Lemmon Survey | EOS | 1.3 km | MPC · JPL |
| 746841 | 2012 GC_{45} | — | January 26, 2015 | Haleakala | Pan-STARRS 1 | · | 580 m | MPC · JPL |
| 746842 | 2012 GD_{45} | — | August 28, 2014 | Haleakala | Pan-STARRS 1 | · | 1.7 km | MPC · JPL |
| 746843 | 2012 GL_{45} | — | November 1, 2013 | Mount Lemmon | Mount Lemmon Survey | · | 530 m | MPC · JPL |
| 746844 | 2012 GQ_{45} | — | March 4, 2017 | Haleakala | Pan-STARRS 1 | · | 1.8 km | MPC · JPL |
| 746845 | 2012 GD_{47} | — | March 25, 2017 | Haleakala | Pan-STARRS 1 | · | 1.6 km | MPC · JPL |
| 746846 | 2012 GJ_{49} | — | June 5, 2005 | Kitt Peak | Spacewatch | · | 1.1 km | MPC · JPL |
| 746847 | 2012 GB_{50} | — | April 1, 2012 | Mount Lemmon | Mount Lemmon Survey | NYS | 890 m | MPC · JPL |
| 746848 | 2012 GZ_{52} | — | April 15, 2012 | Haleakala | Pan-STARRS 1 | · | 1.3 km | MPC · JPL |
| 746849 | 2012 HJ_{1} | — | April 16, 2012 | Catalina | CSS | APO +1km · PHA | 910 m | MPC · JPL |
| 746850 | 2012 HC_{2} | — | April 18, 2012 | Socorro | LINEAR | T_{j} (2.93) | 2.1 km | MPC · JPL |
| 746851 | 2012 HH_{7} | — | April 18, 2012 | Kitt Peak | Spacewatch | · | 1.0 km | MPC · JPL |
| 746852 | 2012 HD_{10} | — | April 19, 2012 | Mount Lemmon | Mount Lemmon Survey | · | 2.1 km | MPC · JPL |
| 746853 | 2012 HL_{10} | — | March 29, 2012 | Haleakala | Pan-STARRS 1 | · | 1.6 km | MPC · JPL |
| 746854 | 2012 HB_{13} | — | April 21, 2012 | Haleakala | Pan-STARRS 1 | · | 2.1 km | MPC · JPL |
| 746855 | 2012 HZ_{16} | — | April 13, 2012 | Kitt Peak | Spacewatch | · | 2.0 km | MPC · JPL |
| 746856 | 2012 HT_{19} | — | October 16, 2009 | Mount Lemmon | Mount Lemmon Survey | PHO | 760 m | MPC · JPL |
| 746857 | 2012 HB_{24} | — | April 25, 2012 | Mount Lemmon | Mount Lemmon Survey | · | 2.8 km | MPC · JPL |
| 746858 | 2012 HM_{24} | — | March 11, 2003 | Kitt Peak | Spacewatch | · | 1.8 km | MPC · JPL |
| 746859 | 2012 HP_{25} | — | April 13, 2012 | Kitt Peak | Spacewatch | · | 1.8 km | MPC · JPL |
| 746860 | 2012 HH_{26} | — | March 29, 2012 | Kitt Peak | Spacewatch | · | 2.5 km | MPC · JPL |
| 746861 | 2012 HC_{29} | — | August 27, 2009 | Kitt Peak | Spacewatch | · | 880 m | MPC · JPL |
| 746862 | 2012 HQ_{33} | — | April 15, 2012 | Haleakala | Pan-STARRS 1 | · | 680 m | MPC · JPL |
| 746863 | 2012 HG_{35} | — | April 21, 2012 | Kitt Peak | Spacewatch | · | 2.1 km | MPC · JPL |
| 746864 | 2012 HS_{37} | — | March 24, 2012 | Kitt Peak | Spacewatch | T_{j} (2.98) | 1.8 km | MPC · JPL |
| 746865 | 2012 HR_{43} | — | April 3, 2012 | Kitt Peak | Spacewatch | · | 850 m | MPC · JPL |
| 746866 | 2012 HY_{46} | — | April 21, 2012 | Mount Lemmon | Mount Lemmon Survey | V | 550 m | MPC · JPL |
| 746867 | 2012 HX_{47} | — | April 21, 2012 | Haleakala | Pan-STARRS 1 | · | 2.1 km | MPC · JPL |
| 746868 | 2012 HG_{52} | — | November 9, 2009 | Kitt Peak | Spacewatch | · | 1.4 km | MPC · JPL |
| 746869 | 2012 HW_{53} | — | October 12, 2010 | Mount Lemmon | Mount Lemmon Survey | · | 630 m | MPC · JPL |
| 746870 | 2012 HG_{58} | — | February 27, 2012 | Kitt Peak | Spacewatch | · | 910 m | MPC · JPL |
| 746871 | 2012 HC_{65} | — | June 21, 2007 | Mount Lemmon | Mount Lemmon Survey | THB | 2.6 km | MPC · JPL |
| 746872 | 2012 HK_{70} | — | March 27, 2012 | Kitt Peak | Spacewatch | H | 450 m | MPC · JPL |
| 746873 | 2012 HL_{74} | — | March 27, 2012 | Kitt Peak | Spacewatch | · | 2.6 km | MPC · JPL |
| 746874 | 2012 HS_{76} | — | June 17, 2005 | Mount Lemmon | Mount Lemmon Survey | · | 820 m | MPC · JPL |
| 746875 | 2012 HE_{88} | — | October 26, 2013 | Mount Lemmon | Mount Lemmon Survey | · | 630 m | MPC · JPL |
| 746876 | 2012 HF_{88} | — | April 27, 2012 | Haleakala | Pan-STARRS 1 | · | 680 m | MPC · JPL |
| 746877 | 2012 HS_{88} | — | July 6, 2013 | Haleakala | Pan-STARRS 1 | · | 2.3 km | MPC · JPL |
| 746878 | 2012 HV_{88} | — | April 29, 2012 | Kitt Peak | Spacewatch | · | 2.0 km | MPC · JPL |
| 746879 | 2012 HM_{89} | — | April 29, 2012 | Kitt Peak | Spacewatch | · | 1.5 km | MPC · JPL |
| 746880 | 2012 HW_{90} | — | March 28, 2012 | Mount Lemmon | Mount Lemmon Survey | · | 1.2 km | MPC · JPL |
| 746881 | 2012 HJ_{91} | — | April 27, 2012 | Haleakala | Pan-STARRS 1 | · | 1.3 km | MPC · JPL |
| 746882 | 2012 HU_{93} | — | September 12, 2013 | Catalina | CSS | V | 510 m | MPC · JPL |
| 746883 | 2012 HW_{93} | — | April 30, 2012 | Mount Lemmon | Mount Lemmon Survey | · | 520 m | MPC · JPL |
| 746884 | 2012 HA_{94} | — | August 25, 2014 | Haleakala | Pan-STARRS 1 | · | 2.7 km | MPC · JPL |
| 746885 | 2012 HE_{94} | — | April 27, 2012 | Mount Lemmon | Mount Lemmon Survey | · | 2.6 km | MPC · JPL |
| 746886 | 2012 HY_{94} | — | April 24, 2012 | Mount Lemmon | Mount Lemmon Survey | TIR | 2.2 km | MPC · JPL |
| 746887 | 2012 HT_{95} | — | December 13, 2015 | Haleakala | Pan-STARRS 1 | · | 1.6 km | MPC · JPL |
| 746888 | 2012 HB_{96} | — | August 15, 2013 | Haleakala | Pan-STARRS 1 | · | 690 m | MPC · JPL |
| 746889 | 2012 HS_{96} | — | April 27, 2012 | Haleakala | Pan-STARRS 1 | EOS | 1.4 km | MPC · JPL |
| 746890 | 2012 HU_{96} | — | February 6, 2016 | Haleakala | Pan-STARRS 1 | · | 1.7 km | MPC · JPL |
| 746891 | 2012 HN_{98} | — | April 21, 2012 | Mount Lemmon | Mount Lemmon Survey | V | 590 m | MPC · JPL |
| 746892 | 2012 HW_{98} | — | April 16, 2012 | Haleakala | Pan-STARRS 1 | · | 1.2 km | MPC · JPL |
| 746893 | 2012 HE_{99} | — | April 20, 2012 | Mount Lemmon | Mount Lemmon Survey | MAS | 550 m | MPC · JPL |
| 746894 | 2012 HE_{100} | — | April 27, 2012 | Haleakala | Pan-STARRS 1 | V | 450 m | MPC · JPL |
| 746895 | 2012 HZ_{100} | — | April 27, 2012 | Haleakala | Pan-STARRS 1 | · | 780 m | MPC · JPL |
| 746896 | 2012 HF_{101} | — | April 16, 2012 | Kitt Peak | Spacewatch | PHO | 850 m | MPC · JPL |
| 746897 | 2012 HP_{102} | — | April 16, 2012 | Haleakala | Pan-STARRS 1 | · | 980 m | MPC · JPL |
| 746898 | 2012 HE_{103} | — | April 20, 2012 | Mount Lemmon | Mount Lemmon Survey | · | 830 m | MPC · JPL |
| 746899 | 2012 HX_{106} | — | April 29, 2012 | Mount Lemmon | Mount Lemmon Survey | · | 1.3 km | MPC · JPL |
| 746900 | 2012 HZ_{112} | — | April 29, 2012 | Mount Lemmon | Mount Lemmon Survey | · | 530 m | MPC · JPL |

== 746901–747000 ==
back to top

| Designation | | | Discovery | | | Properties | | Ref |
| Permanent | Provisional | Named after | Date | Site | Discoverer(s) | Category | Diam. | Ref |
|---|---|---|---|---|---|---|---|---|
| 746901 | 2012 JP_{1} | — | September 29, 2009 | Mount Lemmon | Mount Lemmon Survey | · | 1.5 km | MPC · JPL |
| 746902 | 2012 JS_{1} | — | April 16, 2012 | Haleakala | Pan-STARRS 1 | PHO | 850 m | MPC · JPL |
| 746903 | 2012 JO_{5} | — | April 22, 2012 | Kitt Peak | Spacewatch | · | 2.1 km | MPC · JPL |
| 746904 | 2012 JR_{5} | — | April 27, 2012 | Haleakala | Pan-STARRS 1 | · | 890 m | MPC · JPL |
| 746905 | 2012 JG_{8} | — | April 30, 2012 | Mount Lemmon | Mount Lemmon Survey | · | 2.1 km | MPC · JPL |
| 746906 | 2012 JV_{8} | — | April 27, 2012 | Haleakala | Pan-STARRS 1 | · | 2.2 km | MPC · JPL |
| 746907 | 2012 JL_{9} | — | April 28, 2012 | Mount Lemmon | Mount Lemmon Survey | MAS | 670 m | MPC · JPL |
| 746908 | 2012 JG_{13} | — | May 14, 2012 | Mount Lemmon | Mount Lemmon Survey | · | 2.7 km | MPC · JPL |
| 746909 | 2012 JP_{22} | — | November 27, 2010 | Mount Lemmon | Mount Lemmon Survey | · | 690 m | MPC · JPL |
| 746910 | 2012 JQ_{24} | — | August 30, 2005 | Kitt Peak | Spacewatch | · | 970 m | MPC · JPL |
| 746911 | 2012 JW_{25} | — | March 6, 2008 | Mount Lemmon | Mount Lemmon Survey | · | 910 m | MPC · JPL |
| 746912 | 2012 JO_{27} | — | October 15, 2004 | Mount Lemmon | Mount Lemmon Survey | · | 1.8 km | MPC · JPL |
| 746913 | 2012 JX_{37} | — | May 1, 2012 | Mount Lemmon | Mount Lemmon Survey | PHO | 660 m | MPC · JPL |
| 746914 | 2012 JU_{38} | — | May 12, 2012 | Mount Lemmon | Mount Lemmon Survey | TIR | 2.2 km | MPC · JPL |
| 746915 | 2012 JF_{42} | — | April 21, 2012 | Mount Lemmon | Mount Lemmon Survey | · | 650 m | MPC · JPL |
| 746916 | 2012 JO_{45} | — | May 15, 2012 | Haleakala | Pan-STARRS 1 | · | 2.3 km | MPC · JPL |
| 746917 | 2012 JX_{48} | — | May 12, 2012 | Mount Lemmon | Mount Lemmon Survey | · | 1.8 km | MPC · JPL |
| 746918 | 2012 JD_{51} | — | April 27, 2012 | Haleakala | Pan-STARRS 1 | TIR | 2.0 km | MPC · JPL |
| 746919 | 2012 JT_{54} | — | May 12, 2012 | Mount Lemmon | Mount Lemmon Survey | · | 2.5 km | MPC · JPL |
| 746920 | 2012 JV_{54} | — | May 12, 2012 | Mount Lemmon | Mount Lemmon Survey | · | 770 m | MPC · JPL |
| 746921 | 2012 JC_{56} | — | May 12, 2012 | Mount Lemmon | Mount Lemmon Survey | · | 1.1 km | MPC · JPL |
| 746922 | 2012 JQ_{56} | — | April 28, 2012 | Mount Lemmon | Mount Lemmon Survey | · | 1.5 km | MPC · JPL |
| 746923 | 2012 JY_{56} | — | October 22, 2009 | Mount Lemmon | Mount Lemmon Survey | · | 2.6 km | MPC · JPL |
| 746924 | 2012 JG_{62} | — | November 2, 2010 | Mount Lemmon | Mount Lemmon Survey | · | 600 m | MPC · JPL |
| 746925 | 2012 JV_{66} | — | March 22, 2012 | Catalina | CSS | H | 600 m | MPC · JPL |
| 746926 | 2012 JG_{68} | — | May 14, 2012 | Haleakala | Pan-STARRS 1 | H | 520 m | MPC · JPL |
| 746927 | 2012 JT_{69} | — | May 12, 2012 | Mount Lemmon | Mount Lemmon Survey | LIX | 3.1 km | MPC · JPL |
| 746928 | 2012 JU_{69} | — | November 20, 2014 | Haleakala | Pan-STARRS 1 | · | 1.7 km | MPC · JPL |
| 746929 | 2012 JU_{70} | — | May 14, 2012 | Mount Lemmon | Mount Lemmon Survey | MAS | 530 m | MPC · JPL |
| 746930 | 2012 JG_{73} | — | May 14, 2012 | Haleakala | Pan-STARRS 1 | THB | 2.2 km | MPC · JPL |
| 746931 | 2012 KZ_{2} | — | May 1, 2012 | Mount Lemmon | Mount Lemmon Survey | · | 1.5 km | MPC · JPL |
| 746932 | 2012 KC_{3} | — | March 23, 2012 | Mount Lemmon | Mount Lemmon Survey | · | 860 m | MPC · JPL |
| 746933 | 2012 KB_{5} | — | May 16, 2012 | Mount Lemmon | Mount Lemmon Survey | H | 480 m | MPC · JPL |
| 746934 | 2012 KD_{5} | — | May 16, 2012 | Mount Lemmon | Mount Lemmon Survey | · | 2.1 km | MPC · JPL |
| 746935 | 2012 KG_{7} | — | June 20, 2005 | Palomar | NEAT | · | 1.1 km | MPC · JPL |
| 746936 | 2012 KZ_{7} | — | October 2, 2010 | Mount Lemmon | Mount Lemmon Survey | H | 460 m | MPC · JPL |
| 746937 | 2012 KX_{11} | — | May 16, 2012 | Haleakala | Pan-STARRS 1 | · | 2.3 km | MPC · JPL |
| 746938 | 2012 KM_{17} | — | August 9, 2007 | Smolyan | Bulgarian National Observatory | · | 1.9 km | MPC · JPL |
| 746939 | 2012 KC_{20} | — | October 23, 2009 | Kitt Peak | Spacewatch | · | 3.0 km | MPC · JPL |
| 746940 | 2012 KB_{21} | — | March 27, 2012 | Kitt Peak | Spacewatch | · | 2.1 km | MPC · JPL |
| 746941 | 2012 KG_{23} | — | April 19, 2012 | Mount Lemmon | Mount Lemmon Survey | · | 2.1 km | MPC · JPL |
| 746942 | 2012 KN_{23} | — | March 28, 2012 | Mount Lemmon | Mount Lemmon Survey | · | 1.6 km | MPC · JPL |
| 746943 | 2012 KP_{32} | — | May 16, 2012 | Mount Lemmon | Mount Lemmon Survey | AGN | 920 m | MPC · JPL |
| 746944 | 2012 KG_{34} | — | April 20, 2012 | Mount Lemmon | Mount Lemmon Survey | · | 2.6 km | MPC · JPL |
| 746945 | 2012 KK_{39} | — | May 18, 2012 | Haleakala | Pan-STARRS 1 | · | 2.9 km | MPC · JPL |
| 746946 | 2012 KK_{42} | — | May 14, 2012 | Haleakala | Pan-STARRS 1 | AEG | 2.6 km | MPC · JPL |
| 746947 | 2012 KO_{44} | — | January 27, 2011 | Mount Lemmon | Mount Lemmon Survey | TIR | 2.1 km | MPC · JPL |
| 746948 | 2012 KK_{45} | — | May 31, 2012 | Mount Lemmon | Mount Lemmon Survey | · | 1.1 km | MPC · JPL |
| 746949 | 2012 KQ_{48} | — | May 15, 2012 | Haleakala | Pan-STARRS 1 | · | 2.2 km | MPC · JPL |
| 746950 | 2012 KO_{49} | — | May 31, 2012 | Mount Lemmon | Mount Lemmon Survey | · | 1.6 km | MPC · JPL |
| 746951 | 2012 KD_{50} | — | May 21, 2012 | Haleakala | Pan-STARRS 1 | · | 550 m | MPC · JPL |
| 746952 | 2012 KM_{52} | — | May 21, 2012 | Mount Lemmon | Mount Lemmon Survey | · | 2.0 km | MPC · JPL |
| 746953 | 2012 KB_{53} | — | May 29, 2012 | Mount Lemmon | Mount Lemmon Survey | · | 3.0 km | MPC · JPL |
| 746954 | 2012 KG_{53} | — | May 21, 2012 | Haleakala | Pan-STARRS 1 | · | 2.5 km | MPC · JPL |
| 746955 | 2012 KJ_{53} | — | May 19, 2012 | Piszkés-tető | K. Sárneczky, S. Kürti | · | 2.8 km | MPC · JPL |
| 746956 | 2012 KL_{53} | — | May 16, 2012 | Haleakala | Pan-STARRS 1 | · | 2.9 km | MPC · JPL |
| 746957 | 2012 KQ_{53} | — | September 15, 2013 | Mount Lemmon | Mount Lemmon Survey | · | 1 km | MPC · JPL |
| 746958 | 2012 KL_{56} | — | May 27, 2012 | Mount Lemmon | Mount Lemmon Survey | · | 780 m | MPC · JPL |
| 746959 | 2012 KN_{56} | — | May 16, 2012 | Haleakala | Pan-STARRS 1 | · | 2.0 km | MPC · JPL |
| 746960 | 2012 KT_{56} | — | May 30, 2012 | Mount Lemmon | Mount Lemmon Survey | · | 610 m | MPC · JPL |
| 746961 | 2012 KX_{56} | — | November 12, 2014 | Haleakala | Pan-STARRS 1 | · | 3.1 km | MPC · JPL |
| 746962 | 2012 KF_{57} | — | October 1, 2003 | Kitt Peak | Spacewatch | EOS | 1.5 km | MPC · JPL |
| 746963 | 2012 KM_{57} | — | May 20, 2012 | Mount Lemmon | Mount Lemmon Survey | · | 2.7 km | MPC · JPL |
| 746964 | 2012 KG_{58} | — | November 26, 2013 | Mount Lemmon | Mount Lemmon Survey | V | 420 m | MPC · JPL |
| 746965 | 2012 KS_{58} | — | May 21, 2012 | Mount Lemmon | Mount Lemmon Survey | · | 2.4 km | MPC · JPL |
| 746966 | 2012 KW_{58} | — | January 13, 2016 | Haleakala | Pan-STARRS 1 | EOS | 1.4 km | MPC · JPL |
| 746967 | 2012 KA_{59} | — | July 15, 2013 | Haleakala | Pan-STARRS 1 | EMA | 2.2 km | MPC · JPL |
| 746968 | 2012 KJ_{59} | — | September 16, 2018 | Mount Lemmon | Mount Lemmon Survey | BRA | 1.3 km | MPC · JPL |
| 746969 | 2012 KE_{62} | — | May 29, 2012 | Mount Lemmon | Mount Lemmon Survey | · | 2.6 km | MPC · JPL |
| 746970 | 2012 LF_{1} | — | June 9, 2012 | Haleakala | Pan-STARRS 1 | PHO | 900 m | MPC · JPL |
| 746971 | 2012 LR_{8} | — | October 1, 2005 | Mount Lemmon | Mount Lemmon Survey | · | 900 m | MPC · JPL |
| 746972 | 2012 LV_{8} | — | June 13, 2012 | Haleakala | Pan-STARRS 1 | · | 2.2 km | MPC · JPL |
| 746973 | 2012 LR_{9} | — | April 21, 2012 | Mount Lemmon | Mount Lemmon Survey | · | 1.1 km | MPC · JPL |
| 746974 | 2012 LP_{10} | — | June 15, 2012 | Haleakala | Pan-STARRS 1 | · | 2.1 km | MPC · JPL |
| 746975 | 2012 LB_{14} | — | May 20, 2012 | Mayhill-ISON | L. Elenin | · | 570 m | MPC · JPL |
| 746976 | 2012 LN_{16} | — | June 10, 2012 | Mount Lemmon | Mount Lemmon Survey | T_{j} (2.99) | 3.5 km | MPC · JPL |
| 746977 | 2012 LJ_{19} | — | June 9, 2012 | Mount Lemmon | Mount Lemmon Survey | · | 2.3 km | MPC · JPL |
| 746978 | 2012 LF_{21} | — | December 11, 2010 | Mount Lemmon | Mount Lemmon Survey | · | 1.9 km | MPC · JPL |
| 746979 | 2012 LS_{25} | — | May 28, 2012 | Mount Lemmon | Mount Lemmon Survey | H | 530 m | MPC · JPL |
| 746980 | 2012 LL_{27} | — | December 21, 2014 | Haleakala | Pan-STARRS 1 | · | 2.1 km | MPC · JPL |
| 746981 | 2012 LX_{27} | — | January 4, 2016 | Haleakala | Pan-STARRS 1 | · | 2.6 km | MPC · JPL |
| 746982 | 2012 LK_{29} | — | March 7, 2016 | Haleakala | Pan-STARRS 1 | VER | 2.2 km | MPC · JPL |
| 746983 | 2012 LN_{29} | — | February 11, 2016 | Haleakala | Pan-STARRS 1 | · | 2.7 km | MPC · JPL |
| 746984 | 2012 LW_{29} | — | June 8, 2012 | Haleakala | Pan-STARRS 1 | · | 1.6 km | MPC · JPL |
| 746985 | 2012 LE_{30} | — | April 19, 2017 | Haleakala | Pan-STARRS 1 | (7605) | 3.1 km | MPC · JPL |
| 746986 | 2012 LB_{31} | — | January 3, 2016 | Haleakala | Pan-STARRS 1 | · | 2.4 km | MPC · JPL |
| 746987 | 2012 MU_{7} | — | February 2, 2008 | Kitt Peak | Spacewatch | NYS | 880 m | MPC · JPL |
| 746988 | 2012 MA_{8} | — | June 16, 2012 | Haleakala | Pan-STARRS 1 | · | 1.4 km | MPC · JPL |
| 746989 | 2012 MP_{9} | — | June 16, 2012 | Mount Lemmon | Mount Lemmon Survey | · | 2.2 km | MPC · JPL |
| 746990 | 2012 MQ_{9} | — | May 13, 2008 | Kitt Peak | Spacewatch | PHO | 740 m | MPC · JPL |
| 746991 | 2012 ME_{11} | — | March 13, 2008 | Mount Lemmon | Mount Lemmon Survey | · | 820 m | MPC · JPL |
| 746992 | 2012 MX_{11} | — | June 16, 2012 | Haleakala | Pan-STARRS 1 | · | 1.1 km | MPC · JPL |
| 746993 | 2012 MJ_{13} | — | June 16, 2012 | Haleakala | Pan-STARRS 1 | · | 1 km | MPC · JPL |
| 746994 | 2012 MM_{13} | — | May 14, 2008 | Mount Lemmon | Mount Lemmon Survey | · | 1.1 km | MPC · JPL |
| 746995 | 2012 MX_{16} | — | October 16, 2013 | Mount Lemmon | Mount Lemmon Survey | · | 1.2 km | MPC · JPL |
| 746996 | 2012 MF_{17} | — | June 16, 2012 | Haleakala | Pan-STARRS 1 | · | 1.1 km | MPC · JPL |
| 746997 | 2012 ML_{17} | — | June 21, 2012 | Kitt Peak | Spacewatch | · | 2.3 km | MPC · JPL |
| 746998 | 2012 MV_{17} | — | March 7, 2016 | Haleakala | Pan-STARRS 1 | · | 2.7 km | MPC · JPL |
| 746999 | 2012 MW_{17} | — | July 8, 2018 | Haleakala | Pan-STARRS 2 | · | 2.9 km | MPC · JPL |
| 747000 | 2012 MC_{18} | — | March 31, 2015 | Haleakala | Pan-STARRS 1 | · | 770 m | MPC · JPL |

back to top
