= List of named minor planets: Z =

This is a partial list of named minor planets, containing all those starting with the letter Z, as of 9 November 2026. It is ordered in a case-insensitive, alphabetical manner and contains a total of 336 entries. Grey minor planets have no article and redirect to the list of minor planets instead (see List of minor planets § Main index).

== Z ==
- 277118 Zaandam
- 10566 Zabadak
- 333594 Zabala
- 23675 Zabinski
- 175017 Záboří
- 60150 Zacharias
- 144769 Zachariassen
- 18671 Zacharyrice
- 333627 Zacharyrule
- 121237 Zachdolch
- 104052 Zachery
- 999 Zachia
- 22481 Zachlynn
- 19585 Zachopkins
- 12468 Zachotín
- 18823 Zachozer
- 18806 Zachpenn
- 19421 Zachulett
- 751385 Zachwatowicz
- 39256 Zacny
- 28917 Zacollins
- 5043 Zadornov
- 4617 Zadunaisky
- 18601 Zafar
- 33958 Zaferiou
- 410817 Zaffino
- 6746 Zagar
- 20005 Zagarella
- 187700 Zagreb
- 800113 Zaharydonchev
- 26629 Zahller
- 256537 Zahn
- 7860 Zahnle
- 11408 Zahradník
- 25124 Zahramaarouf
- 421 Zähringia
- 10626 Zajíc
- 32294 Zajonc
- 6075 Zajtsev
- 174364 Zakamska
- 4244 Zakharchenko
- 5453 Zakharchenya
- 210147 Žalgiris
- 1242 Zambesia
- 11804 Zambon
- 117993 Zambujal
- 1462 Zamenhof
- 119890 Zamka
- 30249 Zamora
- 5047 Zanda
- 17151 Zanderhill
- 21991 Zane
- 10693 Zangari
- 21301 Zanin
- 21039 Zank
- 8215 Zanonato
- 14568 Zanotta
- 2945 Zanstra
- 80135 Zanzanini
- 5751 Zao
- 69496 Zaoryuzan
- 6578 Zapesotskij
- 266646 Zaphod
- 16745 Zappa
- 3834 Zappafrank
- 2813 Zappalà
- 257515 Zapperudi
- 18938 Zarabeth
- 2189 Zaragoza
- 18060 Zarex
- 30081 Zarinrahman
- 17920 Zarnecki
- 26466 Zarrin
- 34450 Zashamickey
- 10223 Zashikiwarashi
- 5910 Zátopek
- 14877 Zauberflöte
- 7440 Závist
- 9150 Zavolokin
- 28642 Zbarsky
- 5895 Žbirka
- 203823 Zdanavičius
- 25354 Zdasiuk
- 213775 Zdeněkdostál
- 3827 Zdeněkhorský
- 34753 Zdeněkmatyáš
- 20364 Zdeněkmiler
- 58440 Zdeněkstuchlík
- 3364 Zdenka
- 18676 Zdeňkaplavcová
- 29477 Zdíkšíma
- 5275 Zdislava
- 246164 Zdvyzhensk
- 392728 Zdzisławłączny
- 131181 Žebrák
- 281208 Žebrauskas
- 2623 Zech
- 1336 Zeelandia
- 29212 Zeeman
- 20616 Zeeshansayed
- 29984 Zefferer
- 16039 Zeglin
- 5267 Zegmott
- 208425 Zehavi
- 702686 Zehr
- 20165 Zeigler
- 53253 Zeiler
- 48681 Zeilinger
- 851 Zeissia
- 27931 Zeitlin-Trinkle
- 157825 Zejda
- 11438 Zeldovich
- 11488 Zeleia
- 9711 Želetava
- 9224 Železný
- 169 Zelia
- 633 Zelima
- 654 Zelinda
- 3042 Zelinsky
- 12584 Zeljkoandreic
- 17801 Zelkowitz
- 2411 Zellner
- 24754 Zellyfry
- 15808 Zelter
- 348511 Žemaitė
- 658882 Žemaitija
- 31859 Zemaitis
- 10834 Zembsch-Schreve
- 5219 Zemka
- 25094 Zemtsov
- 7538 Zenbei
- 20774 Zender
- 21398 Zengguoshou
- 26188 Zengqingcun
- 375043 Zengweizhou
- 22567 Zenisek
- 38268 Zenkert
- 840 Zenobia
- 58709 Zenocolò
- 6186 Zenon
- 845241 Zentaalksne
- 12923 Zephyr
- 693 Zerbinetta
- 367392 Zeri
- 121232 Zerin
- 531 Zerlina
- 14990 Zermelo
- 11779 Zernike
- 4321 Zero
- 24996 Zerocalcare
- 333065 Zeszut
- 5731 Zeus
- 438 Zeuxo
- 34712 Zexixing
- 29659 Zeyuliu
- 4311 Zguridi
- 25100 Zhaiweichao
- 1802 Zhang Heng
- 498394 Zhangbosheng
- 15040 Zhangchao
- 19282 Zhangcunhao
- 8311 Zhangdaning
- 698847 Zhangguimin
- 3028 Zhangguoxi
- 79418 Zhangjiajie
- 34474 Zhangjingru
- 210232 Zhangjinqiu
- 7154 Zhangmaolin
- 698372 Zhangmi
- 32313 Zhangmichael
- 10397 Zhangmingchang
- 25584 Zhangnelson
- 514986 Zhangweiguo
- 20831 Zhangyi
- 30336 Zhangyizhen
- 21825 Zhangyizhong
- 34475 Zhangyuhui
- 53537 Zhangyun
- 20775 Zhaohaibin
- 739634 Zhaojingyuan
- 7811 Zhaojiuzhang
- 25102 Zhaoye
- 8412 Zhaozhongxian
- 34326 Zhaurova
- 2631 Zhejiang
- 236743 Zhejiangdaxue
- 29438 Zhengjia
- 32093 Zhengyan
- 12935 Zhengzhemin
- 12421 Zhenya
- 17736 Zhifeiyu
- 5930 Zhiganov
- 14346 Zhilyaev
- 34206 Zhiyuewang
- 241113 Zhongda
- 527205 Zhongdatianwen
- 3789 Zhongguo
- 719987 Zhonghe
- 19298 Zhongkeda
- 7800 Zhongkeyuan
- 237187 Zhonglihe
- 325136 Zhongnanshan
- 1734 Zhongolovich
- 21725 Zhongyuechen
- 3462 Zhouguangzhao
- 4925 Zhoushan
- 20777 Zhouwenhan
- 718863 Zhouwenjie
- 120730 Zhouyouyuan
- 15067 Zhuangtianshan
- 195657 Zhuangqining
- 10388 Zhuguangya
- 2903 Zhuhai
- 546049 Zhujin
- 2132 Zhukov
- 472235 Zhulong
- 391996 Zhunenghong
- 26087 Zhuravleva
- 21731 Zhuruochen
- 20689 Zhuyuanchen
- 21728 Zhuzhirui
- 256698 Zhuzhixin
- 5931 Zhvanetskij
- 117240 Zhytomyr
- 121336 Žiarnadhronom
- 13351 Zibeline
- 174365 Zibetti
- 7817 Zibiturtle
- 3951 Zichichi
- 58578 Žídek
- 24959 Zielenbach
- 7909 Ziffer
- 22490 Zigamiyama
- 230648 Zikmund
- 72596 Zilkha
- 15724 Zille
- 315493 Zimin
- 23003 Ziminski
- 3064 Zimmer
- 3100 Zimmerman
- 1775 Zimmerwald
- 26302 Zimolzak
- 567329 Zinaida
- 16742 Zink
- 4615 Zinner
- 300286 Zintun
- 11485 Zinzendorf
- 34775 Zinzi
- 145075 Zipernowsky
- 7565 Zipfel
- 10911 Ziqiangbuxi
- 8425 Zirankexuejijin
- 612946 Žirmūnai
- 6949 Zissell
- 689 Zita
- 17410 Zitarrosa
- 638676 Žižek
- 26946 Ziziyu
- 48070 Zizza
- 4408 Zlatá Koruna
- 40763 Zloch
- 34134 Zlokapa
- 11481 Znannya
- 20781 Znášik
- 15390 Znojil
- 7572 Znokai
- 18661 Zoccoli
- 11420 Zoeweiss
- 14809 Zoewilbur
- 229198 Zofiahuppenthal
- 6030 Zolensky
- 32855 Zollitsch
- 486170 Zolnowska
- 384815 Żołnowski
- 8142 Zolotov
- 756509 Zoltandeak
- 130127 Zoltanfarkas
- 18292 Zoltowski
- 1468 Zomba
- 335799 Zonglü
- 14267 Zook
- 524522 Zoozve
- 4907 Zoser
- 5759 Zoshchenko
- 486239 Zosiakaczmarek
- 325812 Zouchenglu
- 43188 Zouxiaoduan
- 1793 Zoya
- 7003 Zoyamironova
- 19835 Zreda
- 7701 Zrzavý
- 166614 Zsazsa
- 84995 Zselic
- 161092 Zsigmond
- 175437 Zsivótzky
- 1888 Zu Chong-Zhi
- 23571 Zuaboni
- 865 Zubaida
- 6635 Zuber
- 6232 Zubitskia
- 10022 Zubov
- 121594 Zubritsky
- 49187 Zucchini
- 174466 Zucker
- 8058 Zuckmayer
- 10452 Zuev
- 293809 Zugspitze
- 1922 Zulu
- 29994 Zuoyu
- 227152 Zupi
- 12321 Zurakowski
- 145562 Zurbriggen
- 289116 Zurbuchen
- 475802 Zurek
- 13025 Zürich
- 20783 Zurigray
- 31134 Zurria
- 2323 Zverev
- 1700 Zvezdara
- 6465 Zvezdotchet
- 12406 Zvíkov
- 175636 Zvyagel
- 9691 Zwaan
- 28695 Zwanzig
- 20529 Zwerling
- 785 Zwetana
- 1803 Zwicky
- 6213 Zwiers
- 9663 Zwin
- 7908 Zwingli
- 658129 Zwitter
- 4879 Zykina
- 2098 Zyskin
- 551231 Żywiec
- 661178 Żywiecmed
- 22521 ZZ Top
back to top

== See also ==
- List of minor planet discoverers
- List of observatory codes
- Meanings of minor planet names § Index
