= Planet Z =

Planet Z may refer to:

== Music ==
- Planet Z, cymbals made by Avedis Zildjian Company
- Planet Z, a 2020 album by Panzerballett
- Planet Z, a dance music radio show on WHTZ (Z100), New York-New Jersey
- Planet Z Recording Studios, Massachusetts, USA; a U.S. recording studio owned and operated by producer Chris "Zeuss" Harris

== Fictional locations ==
- Planet Z, a fictional location from the 1986 film Summer Impressions of Planet Z
- Planet Z, a fictional location ruled by Emperor Zurg, from Buzz Lightyear of Star Command
- Planet Z, a fictional location from Hurricane, a comic published by Fleetway Publications
- Planet Z, a fictional location from The Kid from Planet Z novel series by Nancy E. Krulik

== Other uses ==
- A planet filled with zombies

== See also ==
- List of named minor planets: Z
- Planet Y
- Planet X (disambiguation)
