= List of minor planets: 751001–752000 =

The following is a partial list of minor planets, running from minor-planet number 751001 through 752000, inclusive. The primary data for this and other partial lists is based on JPL's "Small-Body Orbital Elements" and data available from the Minor Planet Center. Critical list information is also provided by the MPC, unless otherwise specified from Lowell Observatory. A detailed description of the table's columns and additional sources are given on the main page including a complete list of every page in this series, and a statistical break-up on the dynamical classification of minor planets.

Also see the summary list of all named bodies in numerical and alphabetical order, and the corresponding naming citations for the number range of this particular list. New namings may only be added to this list after official publication, as the preannouncement of names is condemned by the Working Group for Small Bodies Nomenclature of the International Astronomical Union.

Near-Earth obj.	MBA (inner)	MBA (outer)	Centaur
Mars-crosser	MBA (middle)	Jupiter trojan	Trans-Neptunian obj.
Unclassified

== 751001–751100 ==
Designation			Discovery			Properties		Ref
Permanent	Provisional	Named after	Date	Site	Discoverer(s)	Category	Diam.	Ref
751001	2015 AZ_{256}	—	December 29, 2014	Haleakala	Pan-STARRS 1	·	2.8 km	MPC · JPL
751002	2015 AO_{257}	—	December 21, 2014	Haleakala	Pan-STARRS 1	·	2.8 km	MPC · JPL
751003	2015 AH_{258}	—	December 21, 2014	Haleakala	Pan-STARRS 1	VER	2.1 km	MPC · JPL
751004	2015 AE_{259}	—	October 30, 2007	Mount Lemmon	Mount Lemmon Survey	·	480 m	MPC · JPL
751005	2015 AX_{260}	—	September 15, 2007	Kitt Peak	Spacewatch	·	2.5 km	MPC · JPL
751006	2015 AF_{261}	—	January 15, 2015	Haleakala	Pan-STARRS 1	·	1.9 km	MPC · JPL
751007	2015 AQ_{261}	—	January 15, 2015	Haleakala	Pan-STARRS 1	·	2.7 km	MPC · JPL
751008	2015 AJ_{262}	—	January 15, 2015	Haleakala	Pan-STARRS 1	·	2.6 km	MPC · JPL
751009	2015 AF_{266}	—	December 15, 2014	Mount Lemmon	Mount Lemmon Survey	·	2.8 km	MPC · JPL
751010	2015 AT_{269}	—	January 13, 2015	Haleakala	Pan-STARRS 1	T_{j} (2.97)	3.0 km	MPC · JPL
751011	2015 AR_{275}	—	September 14, 2013	Haleakala	Pan-STARRS 1	·	1.5 km	MPC · JPL
751012	2015 AR_{278}	—	January 15, 2015	Haleakala	Pan-STARRS 1	·	610 m	MPC · JPL
751013	2015 AV_{278}	—	April 6, 2008	Mount Lemmon	Mount Lemmon Survey	·	900 m	MPC · JPL
751014	2015 AM_{279}	—	December 7, 2008	Kitt Peak	Spacewatch	·	2.5 km	MPC · JPL
751015	2015 AU_{280}	—	November 3, 2014	Mount Lemmon	Mount Lemmon Survey	·	2.2 km	MPC · JPL
751016	2015 AQ_{281}	—	September 6, 2008	Mount Lemmon	Mount Lemmon Survey	H	420 m	MPC · JPL
751017	2015 AV_{282}	—	January 15, 2004	Kitt Peak	Spacewatch	TIR	1.9 km	MPC · JPL
751018	2015 AG_{283}	—	November 9, 2013	Haleakala	Pan-STARRS 1	·	2.8 km	MPC · JPL
751019	2015 AG_{285}	—	January 13, 2015	Haleakala	Pan-STARRS 1	·	2.6 km	MPC · JPL
751020	2015 AW_{285}	—	January 14, 2015	Haleakala	Pan-STARRS 1	·	1.3 km	MPC · JPL
751021	2015 AZ_{285}	—	January 14, 2015	Haleakala	Pan-STARRS 1	·	2.0 km	MPC · JPL
751022	2015 AZ_{289}	—	February 27, 2012	Haleakala	Pan-STARRS 1	·	510 m	MPC · JPL
751023	2015 AG_{292}	—	February 11, 2004	Palomar	NEAT	·	3.9 km	MPC · JPL
751024	2015 AE_{295}	—	January 15, 2015	Haleakala	Pan-STARRS 1	·	3.2 km	MPC · JPL
751025	2015 AH_{297}	—	January 14, 2015	Haleakala	Pan-STARRS 1	TIR	2.4 km	MPC · JPL
751026	2015 AF_{300}	—	January 12, 2015	Haleakala	Pan-STARRS 1	L5	6.4 km	MPC · JPL
751027	2015 AS_{303}	—	August 26, 2012	Haleakala	Pan-STARRS 1	·	2.6 km	MPC · JPL
751028	2015 BS	—	November 17, 2014	Mount Lemmon	Mount Lemmon Survey	·	1.7 km	MPC · JPL
751029	2015 BY_{6}	—	December 21, 2014	Haleakala	Pan-STARRS 1	·	540 m	MPC · JPL
751030	2015 BP_{8}	—	December 26, 2014	Haleakala	Pan-STARRS 1	·	2.4 km	MPC · JPL
751031	2015 BQ_{8}	—	October 7, 2005	Anderson Mesa	LONEOS	·	1.5 km	MPC · JPL
751032	2015 BS_{8}	—	August 12, 2013	Haleakala	Pan-STARRS 1	·	650 m	MPC · JPL
751033	2015 BG_{9}	—	October 31, 2010	Mount Lemmon	Mount Lemmon Survey	·	720 m	MPC · JPL
751034	2015 BW_{9}	—	February 17, 2010	Mount Lemmon	Mount Lemmon Survey	·	2.3 km	MPC · JPL
751035	2015 BN_{11}	—	August 15, 2013	Haleakala	Pan-STARRS 1	·	1.9 km	MPC · JPL
751036	2015 BA_{13}	—	October 15, 2006	Kitt Peak	Spacewatch	·	980 m	MPC · JPL
751037	2015 BX_{15}	—	March 14, 2007	Mount Lemmon	Mount Lemmon Survey	(5)	1.1 km	MPC · JPL
751038	2015 BD_{16}	—	December 21, 2014	Mount Lemmon	Mount Lemmon Survey	·	2.2 km	MPC · JPL
751039	2015 BK_{16}	—	October 28, 2014	Haleakala	Pan-STARRS 1	·	1.2 km	MPC · JPL
751040	2015 BU_{16}	—	February 13, 2008	Kitt Peak	Spacewatch	·	700 m	MPC · JPL
751041	2015 BB_{18}	—	January 16, 2015	Mount Lemmon	Mount Lemmon Survey	·	3.0 km	MPC · JPL
751042	2015 BK_{18}	—	October 16, 2003	Kitt Peak	Spacewatch	·	1.4 km	MPC · JPL
751043	2015 BN_{19}	—	November 2, 2008	Mount Lemmon	Mount Lemmon Survey	EOS	1.7 km	MPC · JPL
751044	2015 BO_{19}	—	February 8, 2011	Mount Lemmon	Mount Lemmon Survey	·	1.1 km	MPC · JPL
751045	2015 BY_{22}	—	December 2, 2014	Haleakala	Pan-STARRS 1	H	370 m	MPC · JPL
751046	2015 BU_{23}	—	December 9, 2010	Mount Lemmon	Mount Lemmon Survey	·	1.2 km	MPC · JPL
751047	2015 BO_{24}	—	January 16, 2015	Haleakala	Pan-STARRS 1	·	1.8 km	MPC · JPL
751048	2015 BQ_{25}	—	December 3, 2010	Mount Lemmon	Mount Lemmon Survey	·	1.1 km	MPC · JPL
751049	2015 BH_{30}	—	September 22, 2008	Mount Lemmon	Mount Lemmon Survey	·	1.2 km	MPC · JPL
751050	2015 BT_{30}	—	September 11, 2002	Palomar	NEAT	·	2.1 km	MPC · JPL
751051	2015 BT_{36}	—	October 30, 2013	Haleakala	Pan-STARRS 1	·	1.9 km	MPC · JPL
751052	2015 BX_{37}	—	August 6, 2012	Haleakala	Pan-STARRS 1	EUP	3.0 km	MPC · JPL
751053	2015 BR_{39}	—	December 29, 2014	Haleakala	Pan-STARRS 1	·	1.1 km	MPC · JPL
751054	2015 BV_{39}	—	June 18, 2013	Haleakala	Pan-STARRS 1	·	680 m	MPC · JPL
751055	2015 BD_{40}	—	January 17, 2015	Mount Lemmon	Mount Lemmon Survey	AGN	820 m	MPC · JPL
751056	2015 BF_{41}	—	June 4, 2011	Mount Lemmon	Mount Lemmon Survey	·	2.3 km	MPC · JPL
751057	2015 BY_{42}	—	September 27, 2003	Apache Point	SDSS	EOS	1.8 km	MPC · JPL
751058	2015 BQ_{43}	—	January 17, 2015	Mount Lemmon	Mount Lemmon Survey	TIR	2.0 km	MPC · JPL
751059	2015 BS_{45}	—	December 26, 2014	Haleakala	Pan-STARRS 1	·	2.4 km	MPC · JPL
751060	2015 BA_{46}	—	September 14, 2013	Haleakala	Pan-STARRS 1	·	2.5 km	MPC · JPL
751061	2015 BR_{46}	—	November 8, 2007	Mount Lemmon	Mount Lemmon Survey	·	650 m	MPC · JPL
751062	2015 BU_{46}	—	October 26, 2008	Mount Lemmon	Mount Lemmon Survey	·	2.2 km	MPC · JPL
751063	2015 BW_{46}	—	January 17, 2015	Haleakala	Pan-STARRS 1	·	2.2 km	MPC · JPL
751064	2015 BA_{50}	—	January 17, 2015	Haleakala	Pan-STARRS 1	·	560 m	MPC · JPL
751065	2015 BF_{51}	—	January 17, 2015	Haleakala	Pan-STARRS 1	·	2.2 km	MPC · JPL
751066	2015 BQ_{51}	—	January 17, 2015	Haleakala	Pan-STARRS 1	·	2.5 km	MPC · JPL
751067	2015 BA_{53}	—	September 2, 2010	Mount Lemmon	Mount Lemmon Survey	·	590 m	MPC · JPL
751068	2015 BZ_{55}	—	May 27, 2011	Kitt Peak	Spacewatch	·	2.9 km	MPC · JPL
751069	2015 BH_{56}	—	October 20, 2006	Kitt Peak	Spacewatch	V	490 m	MPC · JPL
751070	2015 BO_{56}	—	November 7, 2008	Mount Lemmon	Mount Lemmon Survey	·	1.8 km	MPC · JPL
751071	2015 BO_{58}	—	January 17, 2015	Haleakala	Pan-STARRS 1	·	2.8 km	MPC · JPL
751072	2015 BD_{59}	—	August 12, 2012	Siding Spring	SSS	·	2.7 km	MPC · JPL
751073	2015 BK_{60}	—	January 17, 2015	Haleakala	Pan-STARRS 1	·	2.0 km	MPC · JPL
751074	2015 BD_{61}	—	January 17, 2015	Haleakala	Pan-STARRS 1	·	990 m	MPC · JPL
751075	2015 BG_{62}	—	December 2, 2008	Kitt Peak	Spacewatch	·	1.7 km	MPC · JPL
751076	2015 BY_{64}	—	January 17, 2015	Haleakala	Pan-STARRS 1	ARM	2.9 km	MPC · JPL
751077	2015 BY_{66}	—	January 17, 2015	Haleakala	Pan-STARRS 1	H	390 m	MPC · JPL
751078	2015 BH_{67}	—	April 17, 2012	Catalina	CSS	·	580 m	MPC · JPL
751079	2015 BP_{68}	—	March 13, 2005	Kitt Peak	Spacewatch	·	1.9 km	MPC · JPL
751080	2015 BK_{70}	—	October 29, 2010	Mount Lemmon	Mount Lemmon Survey	·	640 m	MPC · JPL
751081	2015 BX_{70}	—	September 14, 2007	Mount Lemmon	Mount Lemmon Survey	·	2.2 km	MPC · JPL
751082	2015 BA_{73}	—	January 15, 2009	Kitt Peak	Spacewatch	·	2.5 km	MPC · JPL
751083	2015 BN_{73}	—	September 4, 2013	Mount Lemmon	Mount Lemmon Survey	KOR	1.0 km	MPC · JPL
751084	2015 BV_{77}	—	November 13, 2010	Mount Lemmon	Mount Lemmon Survey	·	580 m	MPC · JPL
751085	2015 BF_{78}	—	December 18, 2014	Haleakala	Pan-STARRS 1	LIX	2.3 km	MPC · JPL
751086	2015 BE_{80}	—	October 1, 2008	Kitt Peak	Spacewatch	·	1.8 km	MPC · JPL
751087	2015 BA_{81}	—	April 27, 2011	Kitt Peak	Spacewatch	·	2.9 km	MPC · JPL
751088	2015 BC_{82}	—	December 6, 2008	Kitt Peak	Spacewatch	EOS	1.5 km	MPC · JPL
751089	2015 BK_{84}	—	November 21, 2014	Haleakala	Pan-STARRS 1	·	570 m	MPC · JPL
751090	2015 BB_{86}	—	October 13, 2013	Mount Lemmon	Mount Lemmon Survey	·	2.3 km	MPC · JPL
751091	2015 BC_{93}	—	January 15, 2011	Mount Lemmon	Mount Lemmon Survey	·	1.7 km	MPC · JPL
751092	2015 BX_{95}	—	September 30, 2006	Mount Lemmon	Mount Lemmon Survey	·	830 m	MPC · JPL
751093	2015 BJ_{96}	—	April 28, 2011	Kitt Peak	Spacewatch	·	2.6 km	MPC · JPL
751094	2015 BR_{96}	—	December 6, 2007	Kitt Peak	Spacewatch	·	480 m	MPC · JPL
751095	2015 BY_{98}	—	January 16, 2015	Mount Lemmon	Mount Lemmon Survey	·	2.4 km	MPC · JPL
751096	2015 BV_{103}	—	March 14, 2011	Mount Lemmon	Mount Lemmon Survey	·	1.1 km	MPC · JPL
751097	2015 BH_{107}	—	October 11, 2007	Mount Lemmon	Mount Lemmon Survey	·	2.2 km	MPC · JPL
751098	2015 BK_{107}	—	July 27, 2011	Haleakala	Pan-STARRS 1	·	2.1 km	MPC · JPL
751099	2015 BA_{109}	—	October 23, 2011	Haleakala	Pan-STARRS 1	H	400 m	MPC · JPL
751100	2015 BA_{114}	—	January 17, 2015	Mount Lemmon	Mount Lemmon Survey	·	2.7 km	MPC · JPL

== 751101–751200 ==
back to top

Designation			Discovery			Properties		Ref
Permanent	Provisional	Named after	Date	Site	Discoverer(s)	Category	Diam.	Ref
751101	2015 BU_{114}	—	November 22, 2008	Kitt Peak	Spacewatch	·	2.8 km	MPC · JPL
751102	2015 BW_{117}	—	January 17, 2015	Mount Lemmon	Mount Lemmon Survey	·	2.3 km	MPC · JPL
751103	2015 BS_{122}	—	September 6, 2013	Mount Lemmon	Mount Lemmon Survey	THM	1.7 km	MPC · JPL
751104	2015 BF_{126}	—	January 17, 2015	Haleakala	Pan-STARRS 1	·	1.6 km	MPC · JPL
751105	2015 BO_{126}	—	August 18, 2002	Palomar	NEAT	MAS	580 m	MPC · JPL
751106	2015 BQ_{127}	—	January 17, 2015	Haleakala	Pan-STARRS 1	EOS	1.6 km	MPC · JPL
751107	2015 BC_{129}	—	December 30, 2008	Kitt Peak	Spacewatch	·	2.5 km	MPC · JPL
751108	2015 BW_{132}	—	January 17, 2015	Haleakala	Pan-STARRS 1	·	2.5 km	MPC · JPL
751109	2015 BO_{133}	—	July 14, 2013	Haleakala	Pan-STARRS 1	·	940 m	MPC · JPL
751110	2015 BQ_{136}	—	January 10, 2008	Mount Lemmon	Mount Lemmon Survey	·	650 m	MPC · JPL
751111	2015 BO_{138}	—	August 12, 2012	Siding Spring	SSS	·	2.5 km	MPC · JPL
751112	2015 BS_{139}	—	January 17, 2015	Haleakala	Pan-STARRS 1	(1547)	1.5 km	MPC · JPL
751113	2015 BF_{142}	—	January 17, 2015	Haleakala	Pan-STARRS 1	·	700 m	MPC · JPL
751114	2015 BH_{142}	—	December 13, 2010	Mount Lemmon	Mount Lemmon Survey	·	820 m	MPC · JPL
751115	2015 BF_{146}	—	January 2, 2008	Bergisch Gladbach	W. Bickel	·	580 m	MPC · JPL
751116	2015 BK_{146}	—	January 17, 2015	Haleakala	Pan-STARRS 1	·	2.6 km	MPC · JPL
751117	2015 BF_{149}	—	October 31, 2010	Tenerife	ESA OGS	·	540 m	MPC · JPL
751118	2015 BV_{149}	—	September 28, 2003	Kitt Peak	Spacewatch	·	530 m	MPC · JPL
751119	2015 BV_{150}	—	March 11, 2005	Mount Lemmon	Mount Lemmon Survey	·	570 m	MPC · JPL
751120	2015 BE_{152}	—	January 17, 2015	Haleakala	Pan-STARRS 1	·	970 m	MPC · JPL
751121	2015 BN_{156}	—	March 11, 2007	Mount Lemmon	Mount Lemmon Survey	H	530 m	MPC · JPL
751122	2015 BE_{158}	—	November 19, 2007	Mount Lemmon	Mount Lemmon Survey	·	710 m	MPC · JPL
751123	2015 BH_{158}	—	October 12, 2007	Mount Lemmon	Mount Lemmon Survey	·	2.1 km	MPC · JPL
751124	2015 BK_{158}	—	October 11, 2013	Catalina	CSS	·	1.5 km	MPC · JPL
751125	2015 BA_{159}	—	January 17, 2015	Haleakala	Pan-STARRS 1	·	520 m	MPC · JPL
751126	2015 BX_{171}	—	January 17, 2015	Haleakala	Pan-STARRS 1	·	690 m	MPC · JPL
751127	2015 BY_{172}	—	January 17, 2015	Haleakala	Pan-STARRS 1	·	770 m	MPC · JPL
751128	2015 BN_{176}	—	January 17, 2015	Haleakala	Pan-STARRS 1	·	2.5 km	MPC · JPL
751129	2015 BU_{184}	—	January 17, 2015	Haleakala	Pan-STARRS 1	·	2.6 km	MPC · JPL
751130	2015 BU_{186}	—	February 28, 2008	Mount Lemmon	Mount Lemmon Survey	·	780 m	MPC · JPL
751131	2015 BR_{188}	—	October 3, 2013	Mount Lemmon	Mount Lemmon Survey	·	570 m	MPC · JPL
751132	2015 BT_{197}	—	January 17, 2015	Haleakala	Pan-STARRS 1	NYS	800 m	MPC · JPL
751133	2015 BE_{198}	—	January 17, 2015	Haleakala	Pan-STARRS 1	·	2.3 km	MPC · JPL
751134	2015 BM_{198}	—	November 4, 2014	Haleakala	Pan-STARRS 1	·	3.1 km	MPC · JPL
751135	2015 BR_{198}	—	September 10, 2007	Kitt Peak	Spacewatch	EOS	1.5 km	MPC · JPL
751136	2015 BJ_{200}	—	January 17, 2015	Haleakala	Pan-STARRS 1	·	2.2 km	MPC · JPL
751137	2015 BM_{200}	—	January 17, 2015	Haleakala	Pan-STARRS 1	·	1.9 km	MPC · JPL
751138	2015 BA_{202}	—	September 19, 2003	Palomar	NEAT	·	540 m	MPC · JPL
751139	2015 BK_{203}	—	December 23, 2014	Mount Lemmon	Mount Lemmon Survey	L5	8.7 km	MPC · JPL
751140	2015 BW_{205}	—	November 13, 2002	Socorro	LINEAR	·	3.6 km	MPC · JPL
751141	2015 BG_{206}	—	December 26, 2014	Haleakala	Pan-STARRS 1	·	580 m	MPC · JPL
751142	2015 BN_{206}	—	December 31, 2007	Mount Lemmon	Mount Lemmon Survey	PHO	900 m	MPC · JPL
751143	2015 BZ_{207}	—	January 19, 2005	Kitt Peak	Spacewatch	·	1.6 km	MPC · JPL
751144	2015 BL_{208}	—	September 30, 2010	Mount Lemmon	Mount Lemmon Survey	NYS	870 m	MPC · JPL
751145	2015 BO_{209}	—	December 26, 2014	Haleakala	Pan-STARRS 1	VER	2.3 km	MPC · JPL
751146	2015 BA_{210}	—	July 14, 2013	Haleakala	Pan-STARRS 1	·	1.5 km	MPC · JPL
751147	2015 BD_{210}	—	January 18, 2015	Mount Lemmon	Mount Lemmon Survey	·	2.6 km	MPC · JPL
751148	2015 BW_{210}	—	October 30, 2008	Mount Lemmon	Mount Lemmon Survey	·	3.1 km	MPC · JPL
751149	2015 BA_{211}	—	September 10, 2010	Kitt Peak	Spacewatch	·	780 m	MPC · JPL
751150	2015 BK_{216}	—	February 10, 2010	Kitt Peak	Spacewatch	·	2.7 km	MPC · JPL
751151	2015 BM_{219}	—	October 3, 2013	Haleakala	Pan-STARRS 1	·	2.5 km	MPC · JPL
751152	2015 BC_{222}	—	December 21, 2014	Haleakala	Pan-STARRS 1	·	1.8 km	MPC · JPL
751153	2015 BX_{222}	—	March 22, 2009	Mount Lemmon	Mount Lemmon Survey	·	620 m	MPC · JPL
751154	2015 BY_{222}	—	January 18, 2015	Mount Lemmon	Mount Lemmon Survey	·	2.7 km	MPC · JPL
751155	2015 BW_{223}	—	September 30, 2005	Mount Lemmon	Mount Lemmon Survey	·	890 m	MPC · JPL
751156	2015 BU_{224}	—	August 26, 2012	Haleakala	Pan-STARRS 1	·	2.4 km	MPC · JPL
751157	2015 BG_{233}	—	December 26, 2014	Haleakala	Pan-STARRS 1	EOS	1.5 km	MPC · JPL
751158	2015 BZ_{233}	—	February 13, 2010	Mount Lemmon	Mount Lemmon Survey	·	2.4 km	MPC · JPL
751159	2015 BG_{234}	—	December 18, 2007	Kitt Peak	Spacewatch	·	570 m	MPC · JPL
751160	2015 BG_{236}	—	June 5, 2011	Mount Lemmon	Mount Lemmon Survey	ELF	3.0 km	MPC · JPL
751161	2015 BP_{236}	—	November 10, 2009	Kitt Peak	Spacewatch	·	1.6 km	MPC · JPL
751162	2015 BJ_{237}	—	December 29, 2014	Haleakala	Pan-STARRS 1	·	2.0 km	MPC · JPL
751163	2015 BX_{237}	—	November 27, 2014	Mount Lemmon	Mount Lemmon Survey	·	690 m	MPC · JPL
751164	2015 BZ_{237}	—	November 26, 2014	Haleakala	Pan-STARRS 1	·	530 m	MPC · JPL
751165	2015 BA_{242}	—	November 21, 2008	Kitt Peak	Spacewatch	·	2.3 km	MPC · JPL
751166	2015 BD_{243}	—	January 18, 2015	Haleakala	Pan-STARRS 1	·	2.4 km	MPC · JPL
751167	2015 BL_{244}	—	September 14, 2013	Haleakala	Pan-STARRS 1	LIX	2.7 km	MPC · JPL
751168	2015 BT_{244}	—	January 18, 2009	Mount Lemmon	Mount Lemmon Survey	·	2.5 km	MPC · JPL
751169	2015 BG_{246}	—	January 18, 2015	Haleakala	Pan-STARRS 1	·	1.8 km	MPC · JPL
751170	2015 BA_{248}	—	October 18, 2003	Kitt Peak	Spacewatch	·	540 m	MPC · JPL
751171	2015 BM_{248}	—	September 24, 2008	Catalina	CSS	·	1.9 km	MPC · JPL
751172	2015 BY_{248}	—	October 28, 2006	Kitt Peak	Spacewatch	MAS	580 m	MPC · JPL
751173	2015 BF_{249}	—	February 17, 2004	Kitt Peak	Spacewatch	·	930 m	MPC · JPL
751174	2015 BK_{251}	—	October 2, 2013	Mount Lemmon	Mount Lemmon Survey	THM	2.0 km	MPC · JPL
751175	2015 BX_{252}	—	February 6, 2007	Kitt Peak	Spacewatch	·	1 km	MPC · JPL
751176	2015 BY_{254}	—	September 25, 2011	Catalina	CSS	H	510 m	MPC · JPL
751177	2015 BB_{255}	—	May 26, 2003	Nogales	P. R. Holvorcem, M. Schwartz	·	2.1 km	MPC · JPL
751178	2015 BL_{257}	—	January 18, 2015	Haleakala	Pan-STARRS 1	TIR	2.3 km	MPC · JPL
751179	2015 BR_{258}	—	November 27, 2014	Mount Lemmon	Mount Lemmon Survey	TIR	2.9 km	MPC · JPL
751180	2015 BC_{261}	—	January 18, 2015	Haleakala	Pan-STARRS 1	EOS	1.6 km	MPC · JPL
751181	2015 BG_{261}	—	February 27, 2012	Haleakala	Pan-STARRS 1	·	540 m	MPC · JPL
751182	2015 BB_{265}	—	January 19, 2015	Mount Lemmon	Mount Lemmon Survey	·	2.9 km	MPC · JPL
751183	2015 BC_{268}	—	November 23, 2014	Haleakala	Pan-STARRS 1	·	3.0 km	MPC · JPL
751184	2015 BU_{269}	—	January 19, 2015	Mount Lemmon	Mount Lemmon Survey	·	2.5 km	MPC · JPL
751185	2015 BR_{272}	—	August 31, 2013	Haleakala	Pan-STARRS 1	·	2.9 km	MPC · JPL
751186	2015 BM_{273}	—	June 20, 2013	Haleakala	Pan-STARRS 1	·	2.2 km	MPC · JPL
751187	2015 BE_{278}	—	January 19, 2015	Kitt Peak	Spacewatch	·	2.8 km	MPC · JPL
751188	2015 BZ_{278}	—	October 5, 2013	Haleakala	Pan-STARRS 1	·	1.7 km	MPC · JPL
751189	2015 BH_{280}	—	August 13, 2012	Haleakala	Pan-STARRS 1	·	2.3 km	MPC · JPL
751190	2015 BY_{286}	—	January 19, 2015	Haleakala	Pan-STARRS 1	·	1.9 km	MPC · JPL
751191	2015 BH_{288}	—	January 19, 2015	Haleakala	Pan-STARRS 1	·	1.4 km	MPC · JPL
751192	2015 BZ_{290}	—	January 19, 2015	Haleakala	Pan-STARRS 1	·	2.7 km	MPC · JPL
751193	2015 BE_{292}	—	January 23, 2011	Mount Lemmon	Mount Lemmon Survey	MAS	600 m	MPC · JPL
751194	2015 BP_{292}	—	December 31, 2008	Kitt Peak	Spacewatch	EOS	1.7 km	MPC · JPL
751195	2015 BR_{293}	—	September 29, 2009	Mount Lemmon	Mount Lemmon Survey	·	1.4 km	MPC · JPL
751196	2015 BG_{295}	—	October 25, 2013	Haleakala	Pan-STARRS 1	·	1.9 km	MPC · JPL
751197	2015 BA_{298}	—	April 29, 2011	Westfield	R. Holmes	·	1.8 km	MPC · JPL
751198	2015 BB_{299}	—	March 28, 2008	Mount Lemmon	Mount Lemmon Survey	NYS	800 m	MPC · JPL
751199	2015 BY_{303}	—	January 19, 2015	Haleakala	Pan-STARRS 1	·	610 m	MPC · JPL
751200	2015 BT_{304}	—	February 17, 2007	Kitt Peak	Spacewatch	H	380 m	MPC · JPL

== 751201–751300 ==
back to top

Designation			Discovery			Properties		Ref
Permanent	Provisional	Named after	Date	Site	Discoverer(s)	Category	Diam.	Ref
751201	2015 BA_{305}	—	January 19, 2015	Haleakala	Pan-STARRS 1	H	410 m	MPC · JPL
751202	2015 BG_{306}	—	December 5, 2008	Kitt Peak	Spacewatch	·	3.4 km	MPC · JPL
751203	2015 BS_{312}	—	January 13, 2015	Haleakala	Pan-STARRS 1	KOR	990 m	MPC · JPL
751204	2015 BK_{314}	—	March 8, 2008	Mount Lemmon	Mount Lemmon Survey	·	730 m	MPC · JPL
751205	2015 BV_{316}	—	January 17, 2015	Haleakala	Pan-STARRS 1	·	580 m	MPC · JPL
751206	2015 BC_{318}	—	October 7, 2010	Catalina	CSS	·	560 m	MPC · JPL
751207	2015 BB_{319}	—	January 17, 2015	Haleakala	Pan-STARRS 1	TIR	2.5 km	MPC · JPL
751208	2015 BW_{321}	—	January 17, 2015	Haleakala	Pan-STARRS 1	·	3.0 km	MPC · JPL
751209	2015 BB_{323}	—	September 25, 2012	Mount Lemmon	Mount Lemmon Survey	·	2.8 km	MPC · JPL
751210	2015 BO_{327}	—	January 17, 2015	Haleakala	Pan-STARRS 1	EOS	1.5 km	MPC · JPL
751211	2015 BE_{329}	—	November 6, 2010	Mount Lemmon	Mount Lemmon Survey	·	910 m	MPC · JPL
751212	2015 BN_{330}	—	October 2, 2006	Mount Lemmon	Mount Lemmon Survey	·	860 m	MPC · JPL
751213	2015 BR_{342}	—	April 1, 2012	Mount Lemmon	Mount Lemmon Survey	·	1.1 km	MPC · JPL
751214	2015 BZ_{342}	—	December 5, 2005	Kitt Peak	Spacewatch	·	1.0 km	MPC · JPL
751215	2015 BB_{348}	—	January 18, 2015	Haleakala	Pan-STARRS 1	LIX	2.8 km	MPC · JPL
751216	2015 BA_{350}	—	November 6, 2008	Mount Lemmon	Mount Lemmon Survey	·	2.0 km	MPC · JPL
751217	2015 BX_{350}	—	May 26, 2006	Mount Lemmon	Mount Lemmon Survey	·	480 m	MPC · JPL
751218	2015 BV_{353}	—	October 5, 2013	Haleakala	Pan-STARRS 1	·	2.1 km	MPC · JPL
751219	2015 BM_{354}	—	January 18, 2015	Mount Lemmon	Mount Lemmon Survey	·	950 m	MPC · JPL
751220	2015 BJ_{357}	—	January 20, 2015	Kitt Peak	Spacewatch	EOS	1.6 km	MPC · JPL
751221	2015 BY_{357}	—	October 10, 2007	Mount Lemmon	Mount Lemmon Survey	HYG	2.1 km	MPC · JPL
751222	2015 BT_{358}	—	January 6, 2006	Kitt Peak	Spacewatch	·	1.2 km	MPC · JPL
751223	2015 BE_{359}	—	December 26, 2014	Haleakala	Pan-STARRS 1	·	2.0 km	MPC · JPL
751224	2015 BR_{359}	—	December 26, 2014	Haleakala	Pan-STARRS 1	PHO	900 m	MPC · JPL
751225	2015 BQ_{360}	—	December 22, 2003	Kitt Peak	Spacewatch	·	3.3 km	MPC · JPL
751226	2015 BF_{361}	—	August 15, 2013	Haleakala	Pan-STARRS 1	·	1.5 km	MPC · JPL
751227	2015 BT_{364}	—	December 26, 2014	Haleakala	Pan-STARRS 1	TIR	2.3 km	MPC · JPL
751228	2015 BO_{367}	—	April 2, 2009	Mount Lemmon	Mount Lemmon Survey	·	620 m	MPC · JPL
751229	2015 BZ_{370}	—	October 26, 2008	Mount Lemmon	Mount Lemmon Survey	·	2.4 km	MPC · JPL
751230	2015 BL_{376}	—	February 8, 1999	Kitt Peak	Spacewatch	·	2.5 km	MPC · JPL
751231	2015 BR_{378}	—	December 29, 2014	Haleakala	Pan-STARRS 1	(2076)	490 m	MPC · JPL
751232	2015 BQ_{384}	—	September 17, 2006	Kitt Peak	Spacewatch	·	790 m	MPC · JPL
751233	2015 BR_{384}	—	September 15, 2013	Haleakala	Pan-STARRS 1	NYS	1.1 km	MPC · JPL
751234	2015 BQ_{388}	—	September 12, 2013	Mount Lemmon	Mount Lemmon Survey	·	2.0 km	MPC · JPL
751235	2015 BU_{393}	—	January 20, 2015	Haleakala	Pan-STARRS 1	·	710 m	MPC · JPL
751236	2015 BM_{394}	—	January 20, 2015	Haleakala	Pan-STARRS 1	·	590 m	MPC · JPL
751237	2015 BN_{400}	—	October 11, 2007	Mount Lemmon	Mount Lemmon Survey	VER	2.3 km	MPC · JPL
751238	2015 BF_{402}	—	January 20, 2015	Haleakala	Pan-STARRS 1	V	510 m	MPC · JPL
751239	2015 BM_{404}	—	January 20, 2015	Haleakala	Pan-STARRS 1	·	550 m	MPC · JPL
751240	2015 BY_{408}	—	January 20, 2015	Haleakala	Pan-STARRS 1	EUP	2.6 km	MPC · JPL
751241	2015 BE_{409}	—	April 18, 2012	Mount Lemmon	Mount Lemmon Survey	·	660 m	MPC · JPL
751242	2015 BL_{415}	—	January 20, 2015	Haleakala	Pan-STARRS 1	EOS	1.6 km	MPC · JPL
751243	2015 BM_{415}	—	January 20, 2015	Haleakala	Pan-STARRS 1	·	2.3 km	MPC · JPL
751244	2015 BO_{415}	—	January 20, 2015	Haleakala	Pan-STARRS 1	TIR	2.1 km	MPC · JPL
751245	2015 BU_{415}	—	January 10, 2008	Kitt Peak	Spacewatch	·	500 m	MPC · JPL
751246	2015 BH_{416}	—	January 20, 2015	Haleakala	Pan-STARRS 1	·	1.1 km	MPC · JPL
751247	2015 BZ_{417}	—	September 5, 2007	Mount Lemmon	Mount Lemmon Survey	·	3.1 km	MPC · JPL
751248	2015 BL_{419}	—	October 12, 2010	Mount Lemmon	Mount Lemmon Survey	·	560 m	MPC · JPL
751249	2015 BV_{419}	—	January 20, 2015	Haleakala	Pan-STARRS 1	·	1.5 km	MPC · JPL
751250	2015 BB_{422}	—	May 7, 2011	Mount Lemmon	Mount Lemmon Survey	·	1.6 km	MPC · JPL
751251	2015 BM_{425}	—	January 20, 2015	Haleakala	Pan-STARRS 1	(5)	730 m	MPC · JPL
751252	2015 BB_{426}	—	January 20, 2015	Haleakala	Pan-STARRS 1	·	820 m	MPC · JPL
751253	2015 BZ_{426}	—	January 20, 2015	Haleakala	Pan-STARRS 1	·	2.6 km	MPC · JPL
751254	2015 BA_{430}	—	January 20, 2015	Haleakala	Pan-STARRS 1	·	2.3 km	MPC · JPL
751255	2015 BH_{432}	—	November 8, 2010	Mount Lemmon	Mount Lemmon Survey	·	590 m	MPC · JPL
751256	2015 BW_{436}	—	February 11, 1997	Kitt Peak	Spacewatch	PHO	800 m	MPC · JPL
751257	2015 BG_{438}	—	January 20, 2015	Haleakala	Pan-STARRS 1	·	670 m	MPC · JPL
751258	2015 BL_{439}	—	February 10, 2008	Kitt Peak	Spacewatch	·	680 m	MPC · JPL
751259	2015 BT_{439}	—	July 1, 2011	Kitt Peak	Spacewatch	·	2.3 km	MPC · JPL
751260	2015 BZ_{443}	—	January 20, 2015	Haleakala	Pan-STARRS 1	·	630 m	MPC · JPL
751261	2015 BW_{450}	—	January 20, 2015	Haleakala	Pan-STARRS 1	·	1.7 km	MPC · JPL
751262	2015 BZ_{453}	—	October 3, 2013	Mount Lemmon	Mount Lemmon Survey	THM	1.9 km	MPC · JPL
751263	2015 BE_{454}	—	January 20, 2015	Haleakala	Pan-STARRS 1	LIX	3.0 km	MPC · JPL
751264	2015 BJ_{457}	—	November 4, 2007	Mount Lemmon	Mount Lemmon Survey	·	600 m	MPC · JPL
751265	2015 BH_{459}	—	February 11, 2008	Mount Lemmon	Mount Lemmon Survey	NYS	780 m	MPC · JPL
751266	2015 BB_{461}	—	November 23, 2006	Mount Lemmon	Mount Lemmon Survey	·	890 m	MPC · JPL
751267	2015 BJ_{461}	—	September 10, 2007	Kitt Peak	Spacewatch	·	2.2 km	MPC · JPL
751268	2015 BT_{463}	—	October 20, 2008	Kitt Peak	Spacewatch	·	1.8 km	MPC · JPL
751269	2015 BU_{463}	—	February 22, 2007	Kitt Peak	Spacewatch	H	450 m	MPC · JPL
751270	2015 BA_{465}	—	October 14, 2004	Palomar	NEAT	·	2.8 km	MPC · JPL
751271	2015 BS_{467}	—	January 20, 2015	Haleakala	Pan-STARRS 1	·	2.5 km	MPC · JPL
751272	2015 BK_{468}	—	March 8, 2008	Mount Lemmon	Mount Lemmon Survey	·	720 m	MPC · JPL
751273	2015 BN_{471}	—	February 14, 2010	Mount Lemmon	Mount Lemmon Survey	EOS	1.4 km	MPC · JPL
751274	2015 BG_{472}	—	September 18, 2010	Mount Lemmon	Mount Lemmon Survey	·	630 m	MPC · JPL
751275	2015 BG_{473}	—	January 20, 2015	Haleakala	Pan-STARRS 1	·	2.7 km	MPC · JPL
751276	2015 BU_{473}	—	January 20, 2015	Haleakala	Pan-STARRS 1	·	2.3 km	MPC · JPL
751277	2015 BX_{473}	—	January 20, 2015	Haleakala	Pan-STARRS 1	·	2.4 km	MPC · JPL
751278	2015 BR_{476}	—	January 20, 2015	Haleakala	Pan-STARRS 1	·	890 m	MPC · JPL
751279	2015 BD_{481}	—	March 18, 2010	Mount Lemmon	Mount Lemmon Survey	·	2.6 km	MPC · JPL
751280	2015 BT_{485}	—	December 30, 2007	Kitt Peak	Spacewatch	·	580 m	MPC · JPL
751281	2015 BH_{490}	—	January 20, 2015	Kitt Peak	Spacewatch	·	2.9 km	MPC · JPL
751282	2015 BW_{494}	—	January 10, 2008	Mount Lemmon	Mount Lemmon Survey	V	600 m	MPC · JPL
751283	2015 BA_{506}	—	April 12, 2012	Haleakala	Pan-STARRS 1	·	580 m	MPC · JPL
751284	2015 BM_{506}	—	January 20, 2015	Haleakala	Pan-STARRS 1	·	3.1 km	MPC · JPL
751285	2015 BW_{508}	—	January 21, 2015	Kitt Peak	Spacewatch	·	2.6 km	MPC · JPL
751286	2015 BN_{514}	—	April 30, 2009	Mount Lemmon	Mount Lemmon Survey	T_{j} (2.92)	3.8 km	MPC · JPL
751287	2015 BE_{515}	—	September 24, 2008	Mount Lemmon	Mount Lemmon Survey	H	450 m	MPC · JPL
751288	2015 BG_{515}	—	January 14, 2015	Haleakala	Pan-STARRS 1	H	420 m	MPC · JPL
751289	2015 BO_{520}	—	March 10, 2007	Kitt Peak	Spacewatch	H	450 m	MPC · JPL
751290	2015 BV_{520}	—	September 1, 2013	Mount Lemmon	Mount Lemmon Survey	H	470 m	MPC · JPL
751291	2015 BP_{521}	—	September 30, 2013	Mount Lemmon	Mount Lemmon Survey	L5	7.3 km	MPC · JPL
751292	2015 BW_{521}	—	December 20, 2014	Haleakala	Pan-STARRS 1	H	470 m	MPC · JPL
751293	2015 BY_{521}	—	January 31, 2015	Haleakala	Pan-STARRS 1	H	400 m	MPC · JPL
751294	2015 BF_{532}	—	January 23, 2015	Haleakala	Pan-STARRS 1	·	2.5 km	MPC · JPL
751295	2015 BH_{532}	—	January 23, 2015	Haleakala	Pan-STARRS 1	·	2.6 km	MPC · JPL
751296	2015 BR_{532}	—	January 20, 2015	Mount Lemmon	Mount Lemmon Survey	V	500 m	MPC · JPL
751297	2015 BG_{538}	—	March 1, 2008	Kitt Peak	Spacewatch	(2076)	680 m	MPC · JPL
751298	2015 BD_{539}	—	October 3, 2013	Haleakala	Pan-STARRS 1	·	1.3 km	MPC · JPL
751299	2015 BW_{542}	—	January 29, 2015	Haleakala	Pan-STARRS 1	·	910 m	MPC · JPL
751300	2015 BA_{545}	—	November 1, 2007	Kitt Peak	Spacewatch	·	2.5 km	MPC · JPL

== 751301–751400 ==
back to top

Designation			Discovery			Properties		Ref
Permanent	Provisional	Named after	Date	Site	Discoverer(s)	Category	Diam.	Ref
751301	2015 BK_{545}	—	October 15, 2013	Mount Lemmon	Mount Lemmon Survey	·	2.2 km	MPC · JPL
751302	2015 BQ_{545}	—	January 30, 2009	Mount Lemmon	Mount Lemmon Survey	·	3.1 km	MPC · JPL
751303	2015 BQ_{547}	—	December 21, 2014	Haleakala	Pan-STARRS 1	·	870 m	MPC · JPL
751304	2015 BB_{548}	—	January 16, 2015	Haleakala	Pan-STARRS 1	·	1.3 km	MPC · JPL
751305	2015 BX_{548}	—	March 3, 2005	Kitt Peak	Spacewatch	EOS	1.5 km	MPC · JPL
751306	2015 BG_{551}	—	January 22, 2015	Haleakala	Pan-STARRS 1	·	910 m	MPC · JPL
751307	2015 BC_{553}	—	December 21, 2014	Mount Lemmon	Mount Lemmon Survey	·	670 m	MPC · JPL
751308	2015 BS_{555}	—	November 29, 2014	Haleakala	Pan-STARRS 1	·	550 m	MPC · JPL
751309	2015 BB_{556}	—	August 17, 2012	Haleakala	Pan-STARRS 1	·	2.8 km	MPC · JPL
751310	2015 BD_{556}	—	December 29, 2014	Haleakala	Pan-STARRS 1	·	3.3 km	MPC · JPL
751311	2015 BF_{556}	—	January 22, 2012	Haleakala	Pan-STARRS 1	·	660 m	MPC · JPL
751312	2015 BU_{557}	—	September 9, 2013	Haleakala	Pan-STARRS 1	·	1.3 km	MPC · JPL
751313	2015 BT_{561}	—	April 29, 2011	Kitt Peak	Spacewatch	·	3.3 km	MPC · JPL
751314	2015 BS_{565}	—	January 21, 2015	Haleakala	Pan-STARRS 1	·	540 m	MPC · JPL
751315	2015 BO_{566}	—	September 17, 2009	Mount Lemmon	Mount Lemmon Survey	V	480 m	MPC · JPL
751316	2015 BN_{568}	—	January 25, 2015	Haleakala	Pan-STARRS 1	·	950 m	MPC · JPL
751317	2015 BA_{570}	—	September 15, 2012	Tenerife	ESA OGS	·	2.4 km	MPC · JPL
751318	2015 BV_{576}	—	January 16, 2015	Haleakala	Pan-STARRS 1	·	2.2 km	MPC · JPL
751319	2015 BW_{578}	—	October 3, 2013	Catalina	CSS	·	2.7 km	MPC · JPL
751320	2015 BH_{580}	—	October 18, 2003	Kitt Peak	Spacewatch	·	1.5 km	MPC · JPL
751321	2015 BM_{590}	—	January 22, 2015	Haleakala	Pan-STARRS 1	EOS	1.5 km	MPC · JPL
751322	2015 BY_{590}	—	January 19, 2015	Mount Lemmon	Mount Lemmon Survey	·	2.9 km	MPC · JPL
751323	2015 BN_{591}	—	January 16, 2015	Mount Lemmon	Mount Lemmon Survey	·	1.7 km	MPC · JPL
751324	2015 BH_{594}	—	January 23, 2015	Haleakala	Pan-STARRS 1	·	2.3 km	MPC · JPL
751325	2015 BJ_{594}	—	January 18, 2015	Haleakala	Pan-STARRS 1	·	3.2 km	MPC · JPL
751326	2015 BK_{596}	—	January 20, 2015	Mount Lemmon	Mount Lemmon Survey	·	1.6 km	MPC · JPL
751327	2015 BM_{601}	—	January 20, 2015	Haleakala	Pan-STARRS 1	EOS	1.4 km	MPC · JPL
751328	2015 BC_{602}	—	January 23, 2015	Haleakala	Pan-STARRS 1	·	990 m	MPC · JPL
751329	2015 BD_{603}	—	January 20, 2015	Haleakala	Pan-STARRS 1	·	2.8 km	MPC · JPL
751330	2015 BW_{604}	—	January 25, 2015	Haleakala	Pan-STARRS 1	·	2.2 km	MPC · JPL
751331	2015 BT_{607}	—	January 18, 2015	Mount Lemmon	Mount Lemmon Survey	·	2.2 km	MPC · JPL
751332	2015 BK_{608}	—	January 28, 2015	Haleakala	Pan-STARRS 1	·	1.5 km	MPC · JPL
751333	2015 BB_{611}	—	January 20, 2015	Haleakala	Pan-STARRS 1	·	3.0 km	MPC · JPL
751334	2015 BW_{615}	—	January 16, 2015	Haleakala	Pan-STARRS 1	·	670 m	MPC · JPL
751335	2015 BT_{619}	—	January 20, 2015	Haleakala	Pan-STARRS 1	·	2.5 km	MPC · JPL
751336	2015 CJ	—	January 8, 2015	Haleakala	Pan-STARRS 1	·	1 km	MPC · JPL
751337	2015 CG_{2}	—	November 10, 2010	Mount Lemmon	Mount Lemmon Survey	·	630 m	MPC · JPL
751338	2015 CA_{3}	—	December 8, 2010	Mount Lemmon	Mount Lemmon Survey	·	880 m	MPC · JPL
751339	2015 CD_{3}	—	January 20, 2015	Haleakala	Pan-STARRS 1	NYS	610 m	MPC · JPL
751340	2015 CG_{3}	—	October 30, 2007	Kitt Peak	Spacewatch	·	2.3 km	MPC · JPL
751341	2015 CJ_{4}	—	January 20, 2015	Haleakala	Pan-STARRS 1	·	1.2 km	MPC · JPL
751342	2015 CX_{4}	—	February 8, 2008	Bergisch Gladbach	W. Bickel	·	470 m	MPC · JPL
751343	2015 CF_{5}	—	March 15, 2004	Kitt Peak	Spacewatch	·	2.2 km	MPC · JPL
751344	2015 CF_{7}	—	December 29, 2014	Mount Lemmon	Mount Lemmon Survey	·	2.1 km	MPC · JPL
751345	2015 CU_{7}	—	January 17, 2015	Haleakala	Pan-STARRS 1	·	2.6 km	MPC · JPL
751346	2015 CB_{8}	—	January 20, 2015	Haleakala	Pan-STARRS 1	·	760 m	MPC · JPL
751347	2015 CE_{9}	—	November 5, 2007	Mount Lemmon	Mount Lemmon Survey	·	510 m	MPC · JPL
751348	2015 CW_{10}	—	January 15, 2015	Mount Lemmon	Mount Lemmon Survey	(895)	2.7 km	MPC · JPL
751349	2015 CQ_{11}	—	April 1, 2008	Kitt Peak	Spacewatch	MAS	530 m	MPC · JPL
751350	2015 CD_{12}	—	December 25, 2010	Kitt Peak	Spacewatch	·	1.1 km	MPC · JPL
751351	2015 CK_{12}	—	December 21, 2014	Haleakala	Pan-STARRS 1	·	2.6 km	MPC · JPL
751352	2015 CS_{15}	—	February 8, 2015	Mount Lemmon	Mount Lemmon Survey	·	1.4 km	MPC · JPL
751353	2015 CY_{16}	—	August 22, 2004	Mauna Kea	Veillet, C.	·	1.2 km	MPC · JPL
751354	2015 CX_{17}	—	November 8, 2007	Kitt Peak	Spacewatch	·	3.1 km	MPC · JPL
751355	2015 CO_{19}	—	December 30, 2008	Kitt Peak	Spacewatch	VER	2.3 km	MPC · JPL
751356	2015 CF_{22}	—	October 24, 2013	Kitt Peak	Spacewatch	HOF	2.1 km	MPC · JPL
751357	2015 CZ_{22}	—	January 29, 2015	Haleakala	Pan-STARRS 1	H	450 m	MPC · JPL
751358	2015 CN_{23}	—	February 2, 2008	Kitt Peak	Spacewatch	·	750 m	MPC · JPL
751359	2015 CD_{24}	—	February 10, 2015	Kitt Peak	Spacewatch	·	750 m	MPC · JPL
751360	2015 CE_{24}	—	February 3, 2009	Mount Lemmon	Mount Lemmon Survey	·	2.5 km	MPC · JPL
751361	2015 CZ_{25}	—	March 9, 2005	Mount Lemmon	Mount Lemmon Survey	(883)	580 m	MPC · JPL
751362	2015 CC_{28}	—	January 15, 2015	Haleakala	Pan-STARRS 1	H	500 m	MPC · JPL
751363	2015 CD_{29}	—	February 13, 2004	Kitt Peak	Spacewatch	·	1.1 km	MPC · JPL
751364	2015 CR_{30}	—	February 7, 2015	Mount Lemmon	Mount Lemmon Survey	·	620 m	MPC · JPL
751365	2015 CF_{31}	—	September 30, 2010	Mount Lemmon	Mount Lemmon Survey	·	660 m	MPC · JPL
751366	2015 CN_{31}	—	February 11, 2015	Haleakala	Pan-STARRS 1	·	2.5 km	MPC · JPL
751367	2015 CU_{31}	—	January 2, 2009	Mount Lemmon	Mount Lemmon Survey	·	2.7 km	MPC · JPL
751368	2015 CR_{34}	—	December 26, 2014	Haleakala	Pan-STARRS 1	H	440 m	MPC · JPL
751369	2015 CV_{34}	—	January 24, 2015	Haleakala	Pan-STARRS 1	·	2.3 km	MPC · JPL
751370	2015 CF_{36}	—	February 12, 2015	Haleakala	Pan-STARRS 1	·	2.2 km	MPC · JPL
751371	2015 CJ_{37}	—	February 18, 2010	Mount Lemmon	Mount Lemmon Survey	·	2.9 km	MPC · JPL
751372	2015 CK_{39}	—	January 29, 2015	Haleakala	Pan-STARRS 1	EOS	1.7 km	MPC · JPL
751373	2015 CB_{46}	—	September 10, 2007	Kitt Peak	Spacewatch	·	2.5 km	MPC · JPL
751374	2015 CS_{49}	—	January 30, 2011	Kitt Peak	Spacewatch	·	960 m	MPC · JPL
751375	2015 CC_{52}	—	December 6, 2010	Mount Lemmon	Mount Lemmon Survey	·	970 m	MPC · JPL
751376	2015 CL_{52}	—	February 12, 2004	Kitt Peak	Spacewatch	·	860 m	MPC · JPL
751377	2015 CW_{54}	—	January 23, 2015	Haleakala	Pan-STARRS 1	TIR	2.3 km	MPC · JPL
751378	2015 CE_{55}	—	March 30, 2011	Mount Lemmon	Mount Lemmon Survey	·	860 m	MPC · JPL
751379	2015 CV_{55}	—	February 9, 2005	Mount Lemmon	Mount Lemmon Survey	·	590 m	MPC · JPL
751380	2015 CZ_{55}	—	January 19, 2015	Haleakala	Pan-STARRS 1	·	2.3 km	MPC · JPL
751381	2015 CA_{56}	—	February 28, 2008	Mount Lemmon	Mount Lemmon Survey	·	660 m	MPC · JPL
751382	2015 CJ_{58}	—	January 2, 2014	Mount Lemmon	Mount Lemmon Survey	TIR	2.9 km	MPC · JPL
751383	2015 CT_{62}	—	February 7, 2015	Haleakala	Pan-STARRS 1	H	580 m	MPC · JPL
751384	2015 CW_{62}	—	February 11, 2015	Mount Lemmon	Mount Lemmon Survey	·	2.7 km	MPC · JPL
751385 Zachwatowicz	2015 CN_{64}	Zachwatowicz	September 3, 2013	Tincana	Zolnowski, M., Kusiak, M.	·	1.2 km	MPC · JPL
751386	2015 CE_{66}	—	November 11, 2010	Mount Lemmon	Mount Lemmon Survey	·	630 m	MPC · JPL
751387	2015 CQ_{67}	—	January 20, 2015	Haleakala	Pan-STARRS 1	·	2.2 km	MPC · JPL
751388	2015 CT_{67}	—	January 19, 2004	Kitt Peak	Spacewatch	·	2.9 km	MPC · JPL
751389	2015 CV_{67}	—	January 20, 2015	Haleakala	Pan-STARRS 1	EOS	1.6 km	MPC · JPL
751390	2015 CH_{69}	—	January 23, 2015	Haleakala	Pan-STARRS 1	·	1.9 km	MPC · JPL
751391	2015 CZ_{72}	—	February 12, 2015	Haleakala	Pan-STARRS 1	·	1.8 km	MPC · JPL
751392	2015 CE_{77}	—	January 27, 2015	Haleakala	Pan-STARRS 1	·	600 m	MPC · JPL
751393	2015 DX	—	April 15, 2012	Haleakala	Pan-STARRS 1	·	650 m	MPC · JPL
751394	2015 DX_{1}	—	November 26, 2014	Haleakala	Pan-STARRS 1	·	2.8 km	MPC · JPL
751395	2015 DY_{1}	—	March 13, 2012	Mount Lemmon	Mount Lemmon Survey	·	630 m	MPC · JPL
751396	2015 DJ_{7}	—	October 19, 2010	Mount Lemmon	Mount Lemmon Survey	·	650 m	MPC · JPL
751397	2015 DB_{9}	—	November 11, 2013	Mount Lemmon	Mount Lemmon Survey	VER	2.4 km	MPC · JPL
751398	2015 DH_{9}	—	January 18, 2015	Haleakala	Pan-STARRS 1	·	2.3 km	MPC · JPL
751399	2015 DW_{10}	—	January 17, 2015	Haleakala	Pan-STARRS 1	·	2.6 km	MPC · JPL
751400	2015 DU_{12}	—	September 5, 2013	Catalina	CSS	·	2.1 km	MPC · JPL

== 751401–751500 ==
back to top

Designation			Discovery			Properties		Ref
Permanent	Provisional	Named after	Date	Site	Discoverer(s)	Category	Diam.	Ref
751401	2015 DR_{14}	—	September 12, 2013	Catalina	CSS	·	2.4 km	MPC · JPL
751402	2015 DW_{16}	—	October 8, 2012	Haleakala	Pan-STARRS 1	·	2.8 km	MPC · JPL
751403	2015 DM_{17}	—	January 27, 2015	Haleakala	Pan-STARRS 1	·	690 m	MPC · JPL
751404	2015 DT_{18}	—	January 24, 2015	Mount Lemmon	Mount Lemmon Survey	·	660 m	MPC · JPL
751405	2015 DT_{20}	—	April 28, 2012	Kitt Peak	Spacewatch	·	1.1 km	MPC · JPL
751406	2015 DW_{20}	—	October 18, 2007	Kitt Peak	Spacewatch	·	2.1 km	MPC · JPL
751407	2015 DM_{21}	—	September 26, 2009	Mount Lemmon	Mount Lemmon Survey	·	730 m	MPC · JPL
751408	2015 DJ_{22}	—	September 29, 2010	Mount Lemmon	Mount Lemmon Survey	·	520 m	MPC · JPL
751409	2015 DD_{23}	—	January 30, 2008	Mount Lemmon	Mount Lemmon Survey	·	560 m	MPC · JPL
751410	2015 DA_{27}	—	August 19, 2001	Cerro Tololo	Deep Ecliptic Survey	·	1.0 km	MPC · JPL
751411	2015 DK_{27}	—	March 14, 2004	Kitt Peak	Spacewatch	H	430 m	MPC · JPL
751412	2015 DN_{29}	—	December 4, 2010	Mount Lemmon	Mount Lemmon Survey	·	770 m	MPC · JPL
751413	2015 DJ_{31}	—	October 15, 2013	Mount Lemmon	Mount Lemmon Survey	PHO	680 m	MPC · JPL
751414	2015 DU_{31}	—	February 10, 2008	Kitt Peak	Spacewatch	·	690 m	MPC · JPL
751415	2015 DE_{34}	—	September 30, 2006	Kitt Peak	Spacewatch	·	770 m	MPC · JPL
751416	2015 DK_{35}	—	January 27, 2011	Mount Lemmon	Mount Lemmon Survey	·	770 m	MPC · JPL
751417	2015 DS_{37}	—	January 21, 2015	Haleakala	Pan-STARRS 1	·	2.1 km	MPC · JPL
751418	2015 DX_{37}	—	January 27, 2011	Mount Lemmon	Mount Lemmon Survey	·	880 m	MPC · JPL
751419	2015 DB_{38}	—	July 14, 2013	Haleakala	Pan-STARRS 1	·	880 m	MPC · JPL
751420	2015 DR_{38}	—	March 7, 2008	Kitt Peak	Spacewatch	·	730 m	MPC · JPL
751421	2015 DH_{39}	—	January 21, 2015	Haleakala	Pan-STARRS 1	T_{j} (2.99) · (895)	2.6 km	MPC · JPL
751422	2015 DD_{40}	—	January 27, 2015	Haleakala	Pan-STARRS 1	T_{j} (2.96)	2.5 km	MPC · JPL
751423	2015 DL_{42}	—	February 16, 2015	Haleakala	Pan-STARRS 1	·	2.1 km	MPC · JPL
751424	2015 DV_{42}	—	May 18, 2012	Haleakala	Pan-STARRS 1	·	930 m	MPC · JPL
751425	2015 DW_{42}	—	February 16, 2015	Haleakala	Pan-STARRS 1	H	390 m	MPC · JPL
751426	2015 DL_{44}	—	February 16, 2015	Haleakala	Pan-STARRS 1	·	580 m	MPC · JPL
751427	2015 DY_{46}	—	February 16, 2015	Haleakala	Pan-STARRS 1	V	640 m	MPC · JPL
751428	2015 DW_{49}	—	September 11, 2007	Kitt Peak	Spacewatch	·	2.4 km	MPC · JPL
751429	2015 DE_{52}	—	October 19, 2003	Apache Point	SDSS	·	550 m	MPC · JPL
751430	2015 DM_{56}	—	February 28, 2008	Kitt Peak	Spacewatch	·	920 m	MPC · JPL
751431	2015 DP_{58}	—	January 20, 2015	Kitt Peak	Spacewatch	·	2.7 km	MPC · JPL
751432	2015 DT_{59}	—	September 14, 2005	Kitt Peak	Spacewatch	·	1.0 km	MPC · JPL
751433	2015 DN_{71}	—	February 16, 2015	Haleakala	Pan-STARRS 1	·	950 m	MPC · JPL
751434	2015 DE_{72}	—	October 14, 2010	Mount Lemmon	Mount Lemmon Survey	NYS	660 m	MPC · JPL
751435	2015 DZ_{72}	—	April 14, 2008	Kitt Peak	Spacewatch	·	740 m	MPC · JPL
751436	2015 DX_{78}	—	September 6, 2008	Kitt Peak	Spacewatch	·	1.3 km	MPC · JPL
751437	2015 DN_{83}	—	January 27, 2015	Haleakala	Pan-STARRS 1	·	1.1 km	MPC · JPL
751438	2015 DP_{83}	—	November 20, 2006	Mount Lemmon	Mount Lemmon Survey	·	850 m	MPC · JPL
751439	2015 DC_{84}	—	February 16, 2015	Haleakala	Pan-STARRS 1	·	2.3 km	MPC · JPL
751440	2015 DV_{84}	—	January 14, 2011	Mount Lemmon	Mount Lemmon Survey	·	920 m	MPC · JPL
751441	2015 DP_{94}	—	December 1, 2014	Haleakala	Pan-STARRS 1	PHO	640 m	MPC · JPL
751442	2015 DK_{95}	—	September 15, 2007	Mount Lemmon	Mount Lemmon Survey	·	2.0 km	MPC · JPL
751443	2015 DP_{95}	—	February 16, 2015	Haleakala	Pan-STARRS 1	·	940 m	MPC · JPL
751444	2015 DC_{96}	—	August 14, 2013	Haleakala	Pan-STARRS 1	·	700 m	MPC · JPL
751445	2015 DB_{97}	—	February 16, 2015	Haleakala	Pan-STARRS 1	·	1.6 km	MPC · JPL
751446	2015 DS_{99}	—	February 7, 2011	Mount Lemmon	Mount Lemmon Survey	·	1.1 km	MPC · JPL
751447	2015 DL_{101}	—	September 15, 2007	Mount Lemmon	Mount Lemmon Survey	·	2.5 km	MPC · JPL
751448	2015 DH_{102}	—	October 2, 2013	Catalina	CSS	TIR	2.4 km	MPC · JPL
751449	2015 DC_{104}	—	December 22, 2008	Mount Lemmon	Mount Lemmon Survey	T_{j} (2.94)	3.7 km	MPC · JPL
751450	2015 DN_{105}	—	January 21, 2015	Haleakala	Pan-STARRS 1	·	2.5 km	MPC · JPL
751451	2015 DD_{108}	—	March 18, 2010	Mount Lemmon	Mount Lemmon Survey	·	2.2 km	MPC · JPL
751452	2015 DR_{108}	—	January 20, 2015	Mount Lemmon	Mount Lemmon Survey	·	2.3 km	MPC · JPL
751453	2015 DJ_{110}	—	September 9, 2007	Kitt Peak	Spacewatch	·	2.6 km	MPC · JPL
751454	2015 DM_{115}	—	September 17, 2010	Catalina	CSS	·	700 m	MPC · JPL
751455	2015 DO_{115}	—	January 20, 2015	Mount Lemmon	Mount Lemmon Survey	EUP	3.1 km	MPC · JPL
751456	2015 DS_{115}	—	November 2, 2013	Mount Lemmon	Mount Lemmon Survey	NAE	1.9 km	MPC · JPL
751457	2015 DX_{115}	—	October 5, 2013	Mount Lemmon	Mount Lemmon Survey	·	2.8 km	MPC · JPL
751458	2015 DB_{116}	—	March 16, 2012	Kitt Peak	Spacewatch	·	660 m	MPC · JPL
751459	2015 DF_{118}	—	November 5, 2010	Mount Lemmon	Mount Lemmon Survey	·	800 m	MPC · JPL
751460	2015 DQ_{118}	—	January 4, 2011	Mount Lemmon	Mount Lemmon Survey	·	810 m	MPC · JPL
751461	2015 DO_{119}	—	January 21, 2015	Haleakala	Pan-STARRS 1	·	2.6 km	MPC · JPL
751462	2015 DV_{122}	—	December 29, 2014	Haleakala	Pan-STARRS 1	·	2.5 km	MPC · JPL
751463	2015 DW_{124}	—	February 17, 2015	Haleakala	Pan-STARRS 1	ELF	2.7 km	MPC · JPL
751464	2015 DL_{126}	—	December 29, 2014	Haleakala	Pan-STARRS 1	EOS	1.7 km	MPC · JPL
751465	2015 DR_{126}	—	January 28, 2015	Haleakala	Pan-STARRS 1	·	660 m	MPC · JPL
751466	2015 DX_{128}	—	December 29, 2014	Haleakala	Pan-STARRS 1	·	2.2 km	MPC · JPL
751467	2015 DV_{139}	—	January 15, 2015	Haleakala	Pan-STARRS 1	·	2.5 km	MPC · JPL
751468	2015 DY_{140}	—	May 23, 2001	Cerro Tololo	Deep Ecliptic Survey	·	2.8 km	MPC · JPL
751469	2015 DY_{141}	—	January 18, 2015	Mount Lemmon	Mount Lemmon Survey	·	2.4 km	MPC · JPL
751470	2015 DB_{142}	—	October 2, 2013	Mount Lemmon	Mount Lemmon Survey	·	1.9 km	MPC · JPL
751471	2015 DG_{144}	—	September 1, 2013	Catalina	CSS	·	3.1 km	MPC · JPL
751472	2015 DN_{144}	—	January 17, 2015	Mount Lemmon	Mount Lemmon Survey	V	600 m	MPC · JPL
751473	2015 DW_{144}	—	October 25, 2008	Kitt Peak	Spacewatch	EMA	2.6 km	MPC · JPL
751474	2015 DN_{145}	—	January 19, 2015	Mount Lemmon	Mount Lemmon Survey	(1298)	2.5 km	MPC · JPL
751475	2015 DX_{148}	—	February 9, 2008	Mount Lemmon	Mount Lemmon Survey	·	560 m	MPC · JPL
751476	2015 DC_{150}	—	September 3, 2013	Kitt Peak	Spacewatch	·	2.4 km	MPC · JPL
751477	2015 DF_{152}	—	December 29, 2014	Haleakala	Pan-STARRS 1	·	1.1 km	MPC · JPL
751478	2015 DK_{153}	—	February 18, 2015	Haleakala	Pan-STARRS 1	H	380 m	MPC · JPL
751479	2015 DR_{155}	—	November 26, 2014	Haleakala	Pan-STARRS 1	H	630 m	MPC · JPL
751480	2015 DL_{156}	—	October 3, 2013	Haleakala	Pan-STARRS 1	·	2.1 km	MPC · JPL
751481	2015 DB_{157}	—	March 24, 2012	Catalina	CSS	·	690 m	MPC · JPL
751482	2015 DV_{158}	—	January 26, 2015	Haleakala	Pan-STARRS 1	·	1.1 km	MPC · JPL
751483	2015 DW_{159}	—	December 18, 2007	Mount Lemmon	Mount Lemmon Survey	·	670 m	MPC · JPL
751484	2015 DA_{160}	—	January 15, 2015	Haleakala	Pan-STARRS 1	·	1.2 km	MPC · JPL
751485	2015 DG_{161}	—	April 4, 2010	Catalina	CSS	·	2.3 km	MPC · JPL
751486	2015 DP_{161}	—	February 18, 2015	Mount Lemmon	Mount Lemmon Survey	·	1.4 km	MPC · JPL
751487	2015 DO_{162}	—	February 8, 2011	Mount Lemmon	Mount Lemmon Survey	·	940 m	MPC · JPL
751488	2015 DK_{166}	—	December 29, 2014	Haleakala	Pan-STARRS 1	EUP	2.6 km	MPC · JPL
751489	2015 DQ_{166}	—	January 23, 2015	Haleakala	Pan-STARRS 1	·	2.5 km	MPC · JPL
751490	2015 DX_{169}	—	October 9, 2012	Haleakala	Pan-STARRS 1	TIR	2.6 km	MPC · JPL
751491	2015 DC_{170}	—	November 1, 2013	Elena Remote	Oreshko, A.	·	2.2 km	MPC · JPL
751492	2015 DO_{189}	—	January 27, 2015	Haleakala	Pan-STARRS 1	·	820 m	MPC · JPL
751493	2015 DM_{192}	—	February 20, 2015	Haleakala	Pan-STARRS 1	·	1.8 km	MPC · JPL
751494	2015 DW_{194}	—	January 11, 2015	Haleakala	Pan-STARRS 1	·	540 m	MPC · JPL
751495	2015 DQ_{199}	—	July 17, 2013	Haleakala	Pan-STARRS 1	H	550 m	MPC · JPL
751496	2015 DU_{203}	—	January 23, 2015	Haleakala	Pan-STARRS 1	·	990 m	MPC · JPL
751497	2015 DC_{204}	—	January 23, 2015	Haleakala	Pan-STARRS 1	·	940 m	MPC · JPL
751498	2015 DC_{205}	—	April 15, 2008	Mount Lemmon	Mount Lemmon Survey	·	620 m	MPC · JPL
751499	2015 DJ_{206}	—	November 28, 2013	Mount Lemmon	Mount Lemmon Survey	V	520 m	MPC · JPL
751500	2015 DK_{206}	—	January 24, 2007	Mount Lemmon	Mount Lemmon Survey	·	1.0 km	MPC · JPL

== 751501–751600 ==
back to top

Designation			Discovery			Properties		Ref
Permanent	Provisional	Named after	Date	Site	Discoverer(s)	Category	Diam.	Ref
751501	2015 DE_{214}	—	October 5, 2013	Haleakala	Pan-STARRS 1	·	560 m	MPC · JPL
751502	2015 DU_{217}	—	October 8, 2012	Haleakala	Pan-STARRS 1	·	2.4 km	MPC · JPL
751503	2015 DR_{219}	—	January 23, 2015	Haleakala	Pan-STARRS 1	PHO	710 m	MPC · JPL
751504	2015 DL_{224}	—	January 31, 2008	Mount Lemmon	Mount Lemmon Survey	·	930 m	MPC · JPL
751505	2015 DK_{225}	—	February 29, 2012	Mount Lemmon	Mount Lemmon Survey	H	430 m	MPC · JPL
751506	2015 DP_{225}	—	February 24, 2015	Haleakala	Pan-STARRS 1	H	540 m	MPC · JPL
751507	2015 DU_{225}	—	October 18, 2009	Mount Lemmon	Mount Lemmon Survey	L4	8.3 km	MPC · JPL
751508	2015 DP_{233}	—	January 26, 2009	Mount Lemmon	Mount Lemmon Survey	·	2.0 km	MPC · JPL
751509	2015 DZ_{235}	—	January 28, 2015	Haleakala	Pan-STARRS 1	·	2.0 km	MPC · JPL
751510	2015 DZ_{236}	—	February 10, 2015	Mount Lemmon	Mount Lemmon Survey	·	830 m	MPC · JPL
751511	2015 DB_{240}	—	January 29, 2015	Haleakala	Pan-STARRS 1	·	2.8 km	MPC · JPL
751512	2015 DA_{242}	—	January 19, 2015	Haleakala	Pan-STARRS 1	V	520 m	MPC · JPL
751513	2015 DC_{245}	—	May 26, 2011	Mount Lemmon	Mount Lemmon Survey	·	850 m	MPC · JPL
751514	2015 DM_{246}	—	January 23, 2015	Haleakala	Pan-STARRS 1	·	850 m	MPC · JPL
751515	2015 DR_{246}	—	January 20, 2015	Haleakala	Pan-STARRS 1	EOS	1.4 km	MPC · JPL
751516	2015 DD_{248}	—	January 23, 2015	Haleakala	Pan-STARRS 1	·	790 m	MPC · JPL
751517	2015 DQ_{250}	—	February 27, 2015	Haleakala	Pan-STARRS 1	·	820 m	MPC · JPL
751518	2015 DM_{251}	—	February 27, 2015	Haleakala	Pan-STARRS 1	·	640 m	MPC · JPL
751519	2015 DS_{251}	—	April 11, 2016	Haleakala	Pan-STARRS 1	·	2.7 km	MPC · JPL
751520	2015 DT_{251}	—	February 16, 2015	Haleakala	Pan-STARRS 1	NYS	710 m	MPC · JPL
751521	2015 DA_{254}	—	February 16, 2015	Haleakala	Pan-STARRS 1	TIR	2.1 km	MPC · JPL
751522	2015 DV_{257}	—	February 26, 2015	Mount Lemmon	Mount Lemmon Survey	·	2.0 km	MPC · JPL
751523	2015 DL_{263}	—	January 28, 2015	Haleakala	Pan-STARRS 1	·	2.2 km	MPC · JPL
751524	2015 DD_{266}	—	February 16, 2015	Haleakala	Pan-STARRS 1	·	1.0 km	MPC · JPL
751525	2015 DO_{266}	—	February 16, 2015	Haleakala	Pan-STARRS 1	·	1.7 km	MPC · JPL
751526	2015 DH_{267}	—	February 20, 2015	Haleakala	Pan-STARRS 1	·	2.6 km	MPC · JPL
751527	2015 DP_{277}	—	February 16, 2015	Haleakala	Pan-STARRS 1	L4	7.1 km	MPC · JPL
751528	2015 DV_{289}	—	February 19, 2015	Haleakala	Pan-STARRS 1	EOS	1.4 km	MPC · JPL
751529	2015 DQ_{293}	—	February 18, 2015	Haleakala	Pan-STARRS 1	·	2.9 km	MPC · JPL
751530	2015 DV_{315}	—	January 27, 2015	Haleakala	Pan-STARRS 1	T_{j} (2.92) · AMO +1km	1.5 km	MPC · JPL
751531	2015 EM_{6}	—	February 11, 2008	Mount Lemmon	Mount Lemmon Survey	·	750 m	MPC · JPL
751532	2015 EG_{10}	—	December 18, 2014	Haleakala	Pan-STARRS 1	·	1.1 km	MPC · JPL
751533	2015 EN_{12}	—	January 15, 2015	Haleakala	Pan-STARRS 1	·	2.6 km	MPC · JPL
751534	2015 EU_{12}	—	December 26, 2008	Nyukasa	Nyukasa	HYG	2.6 km	MPC · JPL
751535	2015 EJ_{14}	—	September 18, 2012	Mount Lemmon	Mount Lemmon Survey	·	2.7 km	MPC · JPL
751536	2015 EP_{16}	—	February 13, 2011	Mount Lemmon	Mount Lemmon Survey	·	830 m	MPC · JPL
751537	2015 EN_{17}	—	February 11, 2008	Mount Lemmon	Mount Lemmon Survey	·	840 m	MPC · JPL
751538	2015 EL_{19}	—	January 20, 2015	Haleakala	Pan-STARRS 1	·	2.1 km	MPC · JPL
751539	2015 EE_{20}	—	February 15, 2015	Haleakala	Pan-STARRS 1	·	2.7 km	MPC · JPL
751540	2015 EG_{21}	—	March 21, 2009	Kitt Peak	Spacewatch	·	640 m	MPC · JPL
751541	2015 EA_{22}	—	April 30, 2008	Mount Lemmon	Mount Lemmon Survey	NYS	960 m	MPC · JPL
751542	2015 EL_{29}	—	January 21, 2015	Haleakala	Pan-STARRS 1	EOS	1.3 km	MPC · JPL
751543	2015 ET_{32}	—	November 27, 2013	Haleakala	Pan-STARRS 1	·	2.1 km	MPC · JPL
751544	2015 EA_{36}	—	January 21, 2015	Haleakala	Pan-STARRS 1	·	2.6 km	MPC · JPL
751545	2015 EE_{36}	—	February 10, 2015	Mount Lemmon	Mount Lemmon Survey	VER	2.2 km	MPC · JPL
751546	2015 EB_{38}	—	March 11, 2015	Kitt Peak	Spacewatch	·	2.4 km	MPC · JPL
751547	2015 EQ_{39}	—	December 13, 2010	Mount Lemmon	Mount Lemmon Survey	NYS	700 m	MPC · JPL
751548	2015 EZ_{45}	—	May 20, 2012	Mount Lemmon	Mount Lemmon Survey	PHO	940 m	MPC · JPL
751549	2015 EL_{46}	—	March 17, 2005	Mount Lemmon	Mount Lemmon Survey	·	530 m	MPC · JPL
751550	2015 EV_{49}	—	May 21, 2012	Mount Lemmon	Mount Lemmon Survey	·	630 m	MPC · JPL
751551	2015 EY_{49}	—	August 24, 2012	Kitt Peak	Spacewatch	·	1.7 km	MPC · JPL
751552	2015 EQ_{52}	—	January 26, 2015	Haleakala	Pan-STARRS 1	V	500 m	MPC · JPL
751553	2015 EX_{52}	—	October 9, 2012	Mount Lemmon	Mount Lemmon Survey	·	2.3 km	MPC · JPL
751554	2015 EA_{53}	—	September 13, 2013	Mount Lemmon	Mount Lemmon Survey	·	1.0 km	MPC · JPL
751555	2015 ED_{54}	—	March 14, 2015	Haleakala	Pan-STARRS 1	·	2.3 km	MPC · JPL
751556	2015 ES_{55}	—	March 14, 2015	Haleakala	Pan-STARRS 1	HYG	2.1 km	MPC · JPL
751557	2015 EK_{56}	—	February 10, 2015	Mount Lemmon	Mount Lemmon Survey	·	2.5 km	MPC · JPL
751558	2015 EU_{58}	—	April 9, 2010	Mount Lemmon	Mount Lemmon Survey	·	2.5 km	MPC · JPL
751559	2015 EB_{60}	—	February 16, 2015	Haleakala	Pan-STARRS 1	·	1.1 km	MPC · JPL
751560	2015 EV_{60}	—	January 3, 2012	Kitt Peak	Spacewatch	L4	8.2 km	MPC · JPL
751561	2015 EQ_{73}	—	September 30, 2009	Mount Lemmon	Mount Lemmon Survey	·	720 m	MPC · JPL
751562	2015 EC_{74}	—	November 30, 2005	Mount Lemmon	Mount Lemmon Survey	·	1.1 km	MPC · JPL
751563	2015 EG_{74}	—	March 14, 2015	Haleakala	Pan-STARRS 1	L4	7.8 km	MPC · JPL
751564	2015 ET_{74}	—	March 11, 2015	Mount Lemmon	Mount Lemmon Survey	H	510 m	MPC · JPL
751565	2015 EQ_{75}	—	March 15, 2015	Haleakala	Pan-STARRS 1	ARM	3.4 km	MPC · JPL
751566	2015 FE_{1}	—	January 15, 2015	Haleakala	Pan-STARRS 1	·	2.3 km	MPC · JPL
751567	2015 FK_{10}	—	November 7, 2012	Haleakala	Pan-STARRS 1	·	2.7 km	MPC · JPL
751568	2015 FM_{11}	—	October 6, 2012	Haleakala	Pan-STARRS 1	·	2.3 km	MPC · JPL
751569	2015 FW_{14}	—	December 12, 2012	Mount Lemmon	Mount Lemmon Survey	L4	6.9 km	MPC · JPL
751570	2015 FZ_{23}	—	February 3, 2009	Kitt Peak	Spacewatch	·	2.8 km	MPC · JPL
751571	2015 FH_{25}	—	February 27, 2015	Mount Lemmon	Mount Lemmon Survey	TIR	2.1 km	MPC · JPL
751572	2015 FR_{28}	—	January 15, 2015	Haleakala	Pan-STARRS 1	EUN	870 m	MPC · JPL
751573	2015 FO_{35}	—	November 15, 1999	Socorro	LINEAR	·	1.3 km	MPC · JPL
751574	2015 FH_{36}	—	February 1, 2012	Catalina	CSS	H	540 m	MPC · JPL
751575	2015 FA_{38}	—	March 17, 2015	Haleakala	Pan-STARRS 1	T_{j} (2.99)	2.6 km	MPC · JPL
751576	2015 FK_{38}	—	March 2, 2011	Catalina	CSS	·	1.1 km	MPC · JPL
751577	2015 FL_{39}	—	September 18, 2009	Kitt Peak	Spacewatch	·	880 m	MPC · JPL
751578	2015 FB_{41}	—	October 2, 2008	Mount Lemmon	Mount Lemmon Survey	L4	7.5 km	MPC · JPL
751579	2015 FF_{42}	—	October 25, 2013	Kitt Peak	Spacewatch	PHO	700 m	MPC · JPL
751580	2015 FD_{44}	—	September 28, 2013	Mount Lemmon	Mount Lemmon Survey	H	380 m	MPC · JPL
751581	2015 FH_{44}	—	February 1, 2009	Kitt Peak	Spacewatch	·	2.0 km	MPC · JPL
751582	2015 FW_{44}	—	October 3, 2013	Mount Lemmon	Mount Lemmon Survey	·	890 m	MPC · JPL
751583	2015 FQ_{46}	—	October 24, 2013	Mount Lemmon	Mount Lemmon Survey	AGN	820 m	MPC · JPL
751584	2015 FQ_{47}	—	January 18, 2015	Haleakala	Pan-STARRS 1	EOS	1.5 km	MPC · JPL
751585	2015 FY_{49}	—	January 16, 2015	Haleakala	Pan-STARRS 1	EOS	1.6 km	MPC · JPL
751586	2015 FO_{52}	—	November 23, 2014	Haleakala	Pan-STARRS 1	·	1.2 km	MPC · JPL
751587	2015 FD_{53}	—	January 26, 2015	Haleakala	Pan-STARRS 1	·	970 m	MPC · JPL
751588	2015 FF_{54}	—	October 31, 2007	Mount Lemmon	Mount Lemmon Survey	·	2.8 km	MPC · JPL
751589	2015 FT_{54}	—	February 8, 2011	Catalina	CSS	·	1.0 km	MPC · JPL
751590	2015 FJ_{55}	—	April 10, 2010	Mount Lemmon	Mount Lemmon Survey	·	2.4 km	MPC · JPL
751591	2015 FD_{56}	—	October 19, 2007	Mount Lemmon	Mount Lemmon Survey	·	2.2 km	MPC · JPL
751592	2015 FQ_{64}	—	October 2, 2013	Palomar	Palomar Transient Factory	·	3.3 km	MPC · JPL
751593	2015 FK_{65}	—	October 26, 2012	Mount Lemmon	Mount Lemmon Survey	·	2.6 km	MPC · JPL
751594	2015 FR_{68}	—	March 18, 2015	Haleakala	Pan-STARRS 1	·	3.1 km	MPC · JPL
751595	2015 FE_{74}	—	May 8, 2008	Mount Lemmon	Mount Lemmon Survey	·	760 m	MPC · JPL
751596	2015 FC_{75}	—	March 17, 2015	Haleakala	Pan-STARRS 1	·	1.1 km	MPC · JPL
751597	2015 FZ_{75}	—	May 22, 2011	Mount Lemmon	Mount Lemmon Survey	·	1.1 km	MPC · JPL
751598	2015 FT_{77}	—	October 14, 2009	Mount Lemmon	Mount Lemmon Survey	V	480 m	MPC · JPL
751599	2015 FB_{79}	—	January 30, 2011	Kitt Peak	Spacewatch	PHO	870 m	MPC · JPL
751600	2015 FD_{80}	—	October 12, 2013	Mount Lemmon	Mount Lemmon Survey	·	1.1 km	MPC · JPL

== 751601–751700 ==
back to top

Designation			Discovery			Properties		Ref
Permanent	Provisional	Named after	Date	Site	Discoverer(s)	Category	Diam.	Ref
751601	2015 FX_{82}	—	January 24, 2015	Haleakala	Pan-STARRS 1	·	2.0 km	MPC · JPL
751602	2015 FC_{93}	—	December 14, 2010	Mount Lemmon	Mount Lemmon Survey	·	810 m	MPC · JPL
751603	2015 FU_{95}	—	September 15, 2009	Kitt Peak	Spacewatch	·	870 m	MPC · JPL
751604	2015 FW_{97}	—	March 20, 2015	Haleakala	Pan-STARRS 1	·	2.0 km	MPC · JPL
751605	2015 FD_{103}	—	March 18, 2004	Palomar	NEAT	·	2.6 km	MPC · JPL
751606	2015 FF_{116}	—	August 24, 2011	Haleakala	Pan-STARRS 1	SYL	3.7 km	MPC · JPL
751607	2015 FG_{122}	—	December 14, 2010	Mount Lemmon	Mount Lemmon Survey	MAS	540 m	MPC · JPL
751608	2015 FW_{122}	—	April 21, 2004	Kitt Peak	Spacewatch	·	880 m	MPC · JPL
751609	2015 FW_{125}	—	January 23, 2015	Haleakala	Pan-STARRS 1	·	2.4 km	MPC · JPL
751610	2015 FL_{126}	—	September 6, 2012	Mount Lemmon	Mount Lemmon Survey	·	3.4 km	MPC · JPL
751611	2015 FM_{126}	—	February 26, 2004	Kitt Peak	Deep Ecliptic Survey	·	2.5 km	MPC · JPL
751612	2015 FO_{126}	—	October 26, 2013	Kitt Peak	Spacewatch	·	2.5 km	MPC · JPL
751613	2015 FJ_{127}	—	March 20, 2015	Haleakala	Pan-STARRS 1	·	610 m	MPC · JPL
751614	2015 FN_{127}	—	January 21, 2015	Haleakala	Pan-STARRS 1	·	2.3 km	MPC · JPL
751615	2015 FS_{128}	—	January 21, 2015	Haleakala	Pan-STARRS 1	·	2.6 km	MPC · JPL
751616	2015 FG_{129}	—	October 6, 2013	Kitt Peak	Spacewatch	·	2.5 km	MPC · JPL
751617	2015 FE_{133}	—	October 3, 2013	Kitt Peak	Spacewatch	ELF	3.0 km	MPC · JPL
751618	2015 FV_{137}	—	March 21, 2015	Haleakala	Pan-STARRS 1	·	1.0 km	MPC · JPL
751619	2015 FW_{138}	—	May 5, 2010	Mount Lemmon	Mount Lemmon Survey	·	1.7 km	MPC · JPL
751620	2015 FZ_{143}	—	January 19, 2015	Haleakala	Pan-STARRS 1	·	1.1 km	MPC · JPL
751621	2015 FC_{144}	—	April 11, 2010	Kitt Peak	Spacewatch	·	1.5 km	MPC · JPL
751622	2015 FG_{144}	—	September 28, 2003	Kitt Peak	Spacewatch	H	430 m	MPC · JPL
751623	2015 FK_{144}	—	October 2, 2013	Haleakala	Pan-STARRS 1	·	620 m	MPC · JPL
751624	2015 FJ_{147}	—	April 14, 2008	Kitt Peak	Spacewatch	·	830 m	MPC · JPL
751625	2015 FT_{147}	—	February 8, 1999	Mauna Kea	C. Veillet, J. Anderson	·	980 m	MPC · JPL
751626	2015 FP_{151}	—	November 11, 2009	Mount Lemmon	Mount Lemmon Survey	·	960 m	MPC · JPL
751627	2015 FZ_{153}	—	May 16, 2012	Mount Lemmon	Mount Lemmon Survey	·	540 m	MPC · JPL
751628	2015 FC_{155}	—	April 19, 2012	Kitt Peak	Spacewatch	·	660 m	MPC · JPL
751629	2015 FL_{155}	—	January 28, 2011	Mount Lemmon	Mount Lemmon Survey	·	880 m	MPC · JPL
751630	2015 FY_{159}	—	March 21, 2015	Haleakala	Pan-STARRS 1	·	1.1 km	MPC · JPL
751631	2015 FH_{161}	—	March 21, 2015	Haleakala	Pan-STARRS 1	·	3.3 km	MPC · JPL
751632	2015 FD_{162}	—	October 2, 2006	Mount Lemmon	Mount Lemmon Survey	·	2.8 km	MPC · JPL
751633	2015 FL_{167}	—	March 21, 2015	Haleakala	Pan-STARRS 1	·	1.0 km	MPC · JPL
751634	2015 FE_{168}	—	March 17, 2015	Kitt Peak	Spacewatch	NYS	970 m	MPC · JPL
751635	2015 FG_{170}	—	April 2, 2011	Haleakala	Pan-STARRS 1	·	1.0 km	MPC · JPL
751636	2015 FK_{170}	—	February 7, 2011	Mount Lemmon	Mount Lemmon Survey	·	980 m	MPC · JPL
751637	2015 FB_{173}	—	February 8, 2011	Mount Lemmon	Mount Lemmon Survey	MAS	550 m	MPC · JPL
751638	2015 FW_{183}	—	January 30, 2011	Mount Lemmon	Mount Lemmon Survey	·	900 m	MPC · JPL
751639	2015 FK_{186}	—	January 18, 2015	Haleakala	Pan-STARRS 1	TIR	2.7 km	MPC · JPL
751640	2015 FP_{187}	—	January 18, 2015	Haleakala	Pan-STARRS 1	·	2.5 km	MPC · JPL
751641	2015 FL_{190}	—	January 23, 2015	Haleakala	Pan-STARRS 1	·	960 m	MPC · JPL
751642	2015 FM_{192}	—	December 14, 2006	Kitt Peak	Spacewatch	PHO	810 m	MPC · JPL
751643	2015 FT_{192}	—	August 17, 2012	Haleakala	Pan-STARRS 1	PHO	850 m	MPC · JPL
751644	2015 FK_{193}	—	April 25, 2007	Mount Lemmon	Mount Lemmon Survey	·	1.1 km	MPC · JPL
751645	2015 FC_{194}	—	February 10, 2008	Kitt Peak	Spacewatch	(2076)	670 m	MPC · JPL
751646	2015 FD_{195}	—	March 22, 2015	Haleakala	Pan-STARRS 1	·	1.1 km	MPC · JPL
751647	2015 FD_{196}	—	December 10, 2010	Mount Lemmon	Mount Lemmon Survey	·	860 m	MPC · JPL
751648	2015 FN_{200}	—	April 15, 2012	Haleakala	Pan-STARRS 1	·	580 m	MPC · JPL
751649	2015 FS_{201}	—	September 26, 2006	Kitt Peak	Spacewatch	V	510 m	MPC · JPL
751650	2015 FD_{202}	—	January 10, 2007	Mount Lemmon	Mount Lemmon Survey	NYS	970 m	MPC · JPL
751651	2015 FH_{203}	—	March 1, 2008	Kitt Peak	Spacewatch	·	700 m	MPC · JPL
751652	2015 FQ_{206}	—	January 23, 2015	Haleakala	Pan-STARRS 1	·	1.2 km	MPC · JPL
751653	2015 FO_{207}	—	February 16, 2015	Haleakala	Pan-STARRS 1	·	2.0 km	MPC · JPL
751654	2015 FY_{208}	—	November 24, 2013	Haleakala	Pan-STARRS 1	PHO	880 m	MPC · JPL
751655	2015 FY_{209}	—	January 22, 2015	Haleakala	Pan-STARRS 1	·	570 m	MPC · JPL
751656	2015 FL_{211}	—	February 27, 2015	Mount Lemmon	Mount Lemmon Survey	H	390 m	MPC · JPL
751657	2015 FR_{214}	—	November 4, 2014	Mount Lemmon	Mount Lemmon Survey	PHO	930 m	MPC · JPL
751658	2015 FN_{225}	—	March 23, 2015	Haleakala	Pan-STARRS 1	·	2.1 km	MPC · JPL
751659	2015 FR_{226}	—	March 10, 2011	Kitt Peak	Spacewatch	·	730 m	MPC · JPL
751660	2015 FL_{232}	—	February 12, 2011	Mount Lemmon	Mount Lemmon Survey	MAS	540 m	MPC · JPL
751661	2015 FF_{237}	—	March 23, 2015	Haleakala	Pan-STARRS 1	·	2.3 km	MPC · JPL
751662	2015 FJ_{238}	—	March 22, 2015	Mount Lemmon	Mount Lemmon Survey	HOF	2.1 km	MPC · JPL
751663	2015 FR_{240}	—	March 23, 2015	Haleakala	Pan-STARRS 1	·	1.9 km	MPC · JPL
751664	2015 FH_{241}	—	September 18, 2001	Apache Point	SDSS	·	1.7 km	MPC · JPL
751665	2015 FC_{244}	—	April 14, 2008	Kitt Peak	Spacewatch	V	560 m	MPC · JPL
751666	2015 FE_{244}	—	March 27, 2008	Kitt Peak	Spacewatch	·	790 m	MPC · JPL
751667	2015 FZ_{245}	—	March 23, 2015	Haleakala	Pan-STARRS 1	·	1.0 km	MPC · JPL
751668	2015 FV_{249}	—	October 15, 2012	Haleakala	Pan-STARRS 1	·	2.3 km	MPC · JPL
751669	2015 FQ_{251}	—	August 24, 2011	Haleakala	Pan-STARRS 1	·	3.0 km	MPC · JPL
751670	2015 FT_{254}	—	October 3, 2013	Haleakala	Pan-STARRS 1	·	920 m	MPC · JPL
751671	2015 FT_{259}	—	March 24, 2015	Haleakala	Pan-STARRS 1	·	2.2 km	MPC · JPL
751672	2015 FH_{265}	—	January 27, 2015	Haleakala	Pan-STARRS 1	·	1.9 km	MPC · JPL
751673	2015 FC_{266}	—	November 3, 2010	Mount Lemmon	Mount Lemmon Survey	·	540 m	MPC · JPL
751674	2015 FP_{271}	—	February 18, 2015	Haleakala	Pan-STARRS 1	·	1.0 km	MPC · JPL
751675	2015 FK_{273}	—	September 28, 2009	Mount Lemmon	Mount Lemmon Survey	·	780 m	MPC · JPL
751676	2015 FM_{273}	—	March 24, 2015	Haleakala	Pan-STARRS 1	H	430 m	MPC · JPL
751677	2015 FU_{273}	—	January 19, 2015	Haleakala	Pan-STARRS 1	·	690 m	MPC · JPL
751678	2015 FP_{276}	—	January 12, 2008	Kitt Peak	Spacewatch	·	3.0 km	MPC · JPL
751679	2015 FQ_{276}	—	January 21, 2015	Haleakala	Pan-STARRS 1	·	590 m	MPC · JPL
751680	2015 FL_{277}	—	May 29, 2008	Mount Lemmon	Mount Lemmon Survey	·	1.1 km	MPC · JPL
751681	2015 FR_{277}	—	March 24, 2015	Haleakala	Pan-STARRS 1	·	1.0 km	MPC · JPL
751682	2015 FL_{279}	—	November 8, 2010	Kitt Peak	Spacewatch	·	620 m	MPC · JPL
751683	2015 FU_{280}	—	March 20, 2015	Cerro Paranal	Altmann, M., Prusti, T.	·	1.5 km	MPC · JPL
751684	2015 FK_{284}	—	March 24, 2015	Haleakala	Pan-STARRS 1	·	930 m	MPC · JPL
751685	2015 FJ_{290}	—	November 25, 2011	Haleakala	Pan-STARRS 1	H	470 m	MPC · JPL
751686	2015 FG_{292}	—	April 26, 2010	Mount Lemmon	Mount Lemmon Survey	·	2.7 km	MPC · JPL
751687	2015 FT_{294}	—	January 29, 2012	Mount Lemmon	Mount Lemmon Survey	H	510 m	MPC · JPL
751688	2015 FF_{297}	—	March 28, 2015	Haleakala	Pan-STARRS 1	·	760 m	MPC · JPL
751689	2015 FT_{297}	—	February 25, 2007	Mount Lemmon	Mount Lemmon Survey	H	460 m	MPC · JPL
751690	2015 FJ_{298}	—	March 28, 2015	Haleakala	Pan-STARRS 1	·	1.0 km	MPC · JPL
751691	2015 FW_{299}	—	December 31, 2013	Haleakala	Pan-STARRS 1	LIX	2.9 km	MPC · JPL
751692	2015 FF_{300}	—	March 28, 2015	Haleakala	Pan-STARRS 1	·	1.4 km	MPC · JPL
751693	2015 FA_{308}	—	March 23, 2015	Haleakala	Pan-STARRS 1	PHO	690 m	MPC · JPL
751694	2015 FF_{308}	—	April 22, 2004	Desert Eagle	W. K. Y. Yeung	NYS	920 m	MPC · JPL
751695	2015 FX_{309}	—	January 19, 2015	Mount Lemmon	Mount Lemmon Survey	EUP	2.6 km	MPC · JPL
751696	2015 FO_{316}	—	June 11, 2010	Mount Lemmon	Mount Lemmon Survey	HYG	2.3 km	MPC · JPL
751697	2015 FA_{317}	—	October 16, 2006	Catalina	CSS	·	930 m	MPC · JPL
751698	2015 FD_{321}	—	April 7, 2011	Kitt Peak	Spacewatch	·	1.3 km	MPC · JPL
751699	2015 FN_{324}	—	March 25, 2015	Haleakala	Pan-STARRS 1	·	2.7 km	MPC · JPL
751700	2015 FA_{328}	—	March 25, 2015	Haleakala	Pan-STARRS 1	·	610 m	MPC · JPL

== 751701–751800 ==
back to top

Designation			Discovery			Properties		Ref
Permanent	Provisional	Named after	Date	Site	Discoverer(s)	Category	Diam.	Ref
751701	2015 FL_{328}	—	March 25, 2015	Haleakala	Pan-STARRS 1	·	2.1 km	MPC · JPL
751702	2015 FK_{331}	—	January 14, 2011	Mount Lemmon	Mount Lemmon Survey	·	920 m	MPC · JPL
751703	2015 FZ_{331}	—	September 13, 2013	Mount Lemmon	Mount Lemmon Survey	H	490 m	MPC · JPL
751704	2015 FC_{334}	—	March 30, 2015	Haleakala	Pan-STARRS 1	H	430 m	MPC · JPL
751705	2015 FY_{334}	—	May 24, 2011	Nogales	M. Schwartz, P. R. Holvorcem	·	1.1 km	MPC · JPL
751706	2015 FP_{335}	—	March 24, 2015	Mount Lemmon	Mount Lemmon Survey	·	1.4 km	MPC · JPL
751707	2015 FQ_{340}	—	March 31, 2015	Haleakala	Pan-STARRS 1	·	720 m	MPC · JPL
751708	2015 FB_{344}	—	September 17, 2006	Kitt Peak	Spacewatch	PHO	650 m	MPC · JPL
751709	2015 FM_{349}	—	March 16, 2015	Haleakala	Pan-STARRS 1	·	3.1 km	MPC · JPL
751710	2015 FM_{351}	—	February 23, 2015	Haleakala	Pan-STARRS 1	·	1.2 km	MPC · JPL
751711	2015 FW_{352}	—	May 8, 2011	Mount Lemmon	Mount Lemmon Survey	·	870 m	MPC · JPL
751712	2015 FF_{353}	—	December 5, 2010	Mount Lemmon	Mount Lemmon Survey	·	660 m	MPC · JPL
751713	2015 FL_{353}	—	December 27, 2006	Mount Lemmon	Mount Lemmon Survey	NYS	860 m	MPC · JPL
751714	2015 FE_{354}	—	March 17, 2015	Haleakala	Pan-STARRS 1	·	610 m	MPC · JPL
751715	2015 FA_{355}	—	January 18, 2013	Mount Lemmon	Mount Lemmon Survey	L4	5.6 km	MPC · JPL
751716	2015 FO_{355}	—	March 17, 2015	Haleakala	Pan-STARRS 1	MAR	1.0 km	MPC · JPL
751717	2015 FU_{356}	—	December 13, 2006	Mount Lemmon	Mount Lemmon Survey	NYS	910 m	MPC · JPL
751718	2015 FK_{357}	—	March 17, 2015	Haleakala	Pan-STARRS 1	·	930 m	MPC · JPL
751719	2015 FU_{359}	—	March 17, 2015	Haleakala	Pan-STARRS 1	·	830 m	MPC · JPL
751720	2015 FO_{361}	—	December 5, 2012	Mount Lemmon	Mount Lemmon Survey	·	2.4 km	MPC · JPL
751721	2015 FU_{361}	—	September 6, 2008	Mount Lemmon	Mount Lemmon Survey	NYS	910 m	MPC · JPL
751722	2015 FZ_{361}	—	August 25, 2003	Palomar	NEAT	·	1.2 km	MPC · JPL
751723	2015 FP_{365}	—	March 18, 2015	Haleakala	Pan-STARRS 1	H	430 m	MPC · JPL
751724	2015 FZ_{366}	—	January 29, 2015	Haleakala	Pan-STARRS 1	PHO	730 m	MPC · JPL
751725	2015 FZ_{367}	—	October 8, 2012	Haleakala	Pan-STARRS 1	·	2.5 km	MPC · JPL
751726	2015 FT_{368}	—	February 20, 2015	Haleakala	Pan-STARRS 1	PHO	810 m	MPC · JPL
751727	2015 FD_{371}	—	January 28, 2015	Haleakala	Pan-STARRS 1	·	2.7 km	MPC · JPL
751728	2015 FD_{372}	—	March 18, 2015	Haleakala	Pan-STARRS 1	·	2.5 km	MPC · JPL
751729	2015 FM_{372}	—	March 18, 2015	Haleakala	Pan-STARRS 1	PHO	710 m	MPC · JPL
751730	2015 FV_{373}	—	March 18, 2015	Haleakala	Pan-STARRS 1	·	1.0 km	MPC · JPL
751731	2015 FC_{376}	—	March 18, 2015	Haleakala	Pan-STARRS 1	H	430 m	MPC · JPL
751732	2015 FS_{382}	—	October 26, 2013	Kitt Peak	Spacewatch	EOS	1.3 km	MPC · JPL
751733	2015 FX_{385}	—	October 4, 2006	Mount Lemmon	Mount Lemmon Survey	·	830 m	MPC · JPL
751734	2015 FB_{386}	—	March 20, 2015	Haleakala	Pan-STARRS 1	V	470 m	MPC · JPL
751735	2015 FC_{386}	—	February 24, 2015	Haleakala	Pan-STARRS 1	·	2.6 km	MPC · JPL
751736	2015 FR_{387}	—	March 20, 2015	Haleakala	Pan-STARRS 1	·	2.3 km	MPC · JPL
751737	2015 FX_{389}	—	October 18, 2012	Mount Lemmon	Mount Lemmon Survey	EOS	1.9 km	MPC · JPL
751738	2015 FM_{390}	—	October 11, 2012	Haleakala	Pan-STARRS 1	·	690 m	MPC · JPL
751739	2015 FD_{394}	—	October 13, 2010	Mount Lemmon	Mount Lemmon Survey	H	440 m	MPC · JPL
751740	2015 FL_{395}	—	March 22, 2015	Haleakala	Pan-STARRS 1	·	880 m	MPC · JPL
751741	2015 FU_{401}	—	March 17, 2015	Mount Lemmon	Mount Lemmon Survey	·	2.3 km	MPC · JPL
751742	2015 FZ_{403}	—	January 27, 2011	Kitt Peak	Spacewatch	·	900 m	MPC · JPL
751743	2015 FO_{404}	—	March 31, 2015	Haleakala	Pan-STARRS 1	·	2.8 km	MPC · JPL
751744	2015 FF_{409}	—	February 8, 2011	Mount Lemmon	Mount Lemmon Survey	CLA	1.2 km	MPC · JPL
751745	2015 FN_{409}	—	January 25, 2015	Haleakala	Pan-STARRS 1	EUN	850 m	MPC · JPL
751746	2015 FO_{412}	—	March 28, 2015	Haleakala	Pan-STARRS 1	PHO	770 m	MPC · JPL
751747	2015 FR_{412}	—	March 28, 2015	Haleakala	Pan-STARRS 1	PHO	810 m	MPC · JPL
751748	2015 FV_{412}	—	March 11, 2008	Kitt Peak	Spacewatch	V	540 m	MPC · JPL
751749	2015 FO_{414}	—	March 31, 2015	Haleakala	Pan-STARRS 1	EUN	820 m	MPC · JPL
751750	2015 FU_{414}	—	March 16, 2015	Mount Lemmon	Mount Lemmon Survey	·	790 m	MPC · JPL
751751	2015 FG_{416}	—	March 7, 2016	Haleakala	Pan-STARRS 1	·	1.8 km	MPC · JPL
751752	2015 FD_{418}	—	March 21, 2015	Haleakala	Pan-STARRS 1	·	3.1 km	MPC · JPL
751753	2015 FR_{419}	—	March 22, 2015	Haleakala	Pan-STARRS 1	·	920 m	MPC · JPL
751754	2015 FQ_{427}	—	March 30, 2015	Haleakala	Pan-STARRS 1	H	420 m	MPC · JPL
751755	2015 FC_{431}	—	March 25, 2015	Mount Lemmon	Mount Lemmon Survey	NYS	780 m	MPC · JPL
751756	2015 FD_{433}	—	March 28, 2015	Haleakala	Pan-STARRS 1	·	1.1 km	MPC · JPL
751757	2015 FQ_{433}	—	March 21, 2015	Haleakala	Pan-STARRS 1	·	1.1 km	MPC · JPL
751758	2015 FU_{433}	—	March 21, 2015	Haleakala	Pan-STARRS 1	·	2.5 km	MPC · JPL
751759	2015 FC_{434}	—	March 25, 2015	Haleakala	Pan-STARRS 1	·	890 m	MPC · JPL
751760	2015 FO_{436}	—	March 28, 2015	Haleakala	Pan-STARRS 1	·	2.5 km	MPC · JPL
751761	2015 FM_{438}	—	March 28, 2015	Mount Lemmon	Mount Lemmon Survey	H	490 m	MPC · JPL
751762	2015 FV_{438}	—	March 23, 2015	Haleakala	Pan-STARRS 1	·	2.4 km	MPC · JPL
751763	2015 FR_{441}	—	March 20, 2015	Haleakala	Pan-STARRS 1	·	960 m	MPC · JPL
751764	2015 FK_{442}	—	March 21, 2015	Haleakala	Pan-STARRS 1	·	2.4 km	MPC · JPL
751765	2015 FO_{443}	—	March 25, 2015	Mount Lemmon	Mount Lemmon Survey	EUP	2.3 km	MPC · JPL
751766	2015 FO_{450}	—	August 2, 2011	Haleakala	Pan-STARRS 1	·	2.8 km	MPC · JPL
751767	2015 GY_{2}	—	October 5, 2013	Mount Lemmon	Mount Lemmon Survey	·	920 m	MPC · JPL
751768	2015 GT_{4}	—	October 9, 2013	Mount Lemmon	Mount Lemmon Survey	·	2.2 km	MPC · JPL
751769	2015 GV_{4}	—	May 3, 2011	Mount Lemmon	Mount Lemmon Survey	·	920 m	MPC · JPL
751770	2015 GL_{7}	—	March 17, 2015	Haleakala	Pan-STARRS 1	·	1.3 km	MPC · JPL
751771	2015 GK_{8}	—	March 27, 2015	Haleakala	Pan-STARRS 1	·	2.7 km	MPC · JPL
751772	2015 GV_{14}	—	August 23, 2003	Palomar	NEAT	·	1.1 km	MPC · JPL
751773	2015 GA_{15}	—	February 27, 2015	Haleakala	Pan-STARRS 1	·	960 m	MPC · JPL
751774	2015 GO_{15}	—	March 14, 2004	Kitt Peak	Spacewatch	·	660 m	MPC · JPL
751775	2015 GC_{16}	—	September 15, 2007	Kitt Peak	Spacewatch	THB	2.0 km	MPC · JPL
751776	2015 GY_{17}	—	January 25, 2015	Haleakala	Pan-STARRS 1	·	920 m	MPC · JPL
751777	2015 GR_{18}	—	April 1, 2011	Kitt Peak	Spacewatch	·	1.0 km	MPC · JPL
751778	2015 GT_{20}	—	April 22, 2011	Kitt Peak	Spacewatch	·	1.1 km	MPC · JPL
751779	2015 GQ_{21}	—	March 29, 2004	Kitt Peak	Spacewatch	·	890 m	MPC · JPL
751780	2015 GS_{23}	—	March 25, 2015	Haleakala	Pan-STARRS 1	PHO	790 m	MPC · JPL
751781	2015 GK_{25}	—	March 18, 2015	Haleakala	Pan-STARRS 1	H	470 m	MPC · JPL
751782	2015 GG_{26}	—	May 13, 2011	Mount Lemmon	Mount Lemmon Survey	·	1.0 km	MPC · JPL
751783	2015 GC_{27}	—	November 17, 2010	Mount Lemmon	Mount Lemmon Survey	PHO	780 m	MPC · JPL
751784	2015 GF_{27}	—	October 10, 2008	Mount Lemmon	Mount Lemmon Survey	AMO	720 m	MPC · JPL
751785	2015 GZ_{28}	—	February 13, 2011	Mount Lemmon	Mount Lemmon Survey	·	870 m	MPC · JPL
751786	2015 GM_{29}	—	September 25, 2005	Palomar	NEAT	H	510 m	MPC · JPL
751787	2015 GJ_{30}	—	April 30, 2008	Mount Lemmon	Mount Lemmon Survey	·	760 m	MPC · JPL
751788	2015 GU_{34}	—	March 21, 2015	Haleakala	Pan-STARRS 1	·	990 m	MPC · JPL
751789	2015 GG_{36}	—	November 24, 2013	Haleakala	Pan-STARRS 1	·	890 m	MPC · JPL
751790	2015 GZ_{36}	—	October 12, 2005	Kitt Peak	Spacewatch	PHO	870 m	MPC · JPL
751791	2015 GV_{43}	—	January 25, 2015	Haleakala	Pan-STARRS 1	·	1.0 km	MPC · JPL
751792	2015 GW_{43}	—	February 2, 2006	Mauna Kea	P. A. Wiegert	·	800 m	MPC · JPL
751793	2015 GY_{43}	—	April 15, 2015	Haleakala	Pan-STARRS 1	·	2.4 km	MPC · JPL
751794	2015 GD_{48}	—	January 23, 2015	Haleakala	Pan-STARRS 1	·	1.2 km	MPC · JPL
751795	2015 GO_{48}	—	November 8, 2009	Kitt Peak	Spacewatch	·	1.3 km	MPC · JPL
751796	2015 GD_{49}	—	February 23, 2015	Haleakala	Pan-STARRS 1	·	1.7 km	MPC · JPL
751797	2015 GN_{52}	—	February 10, 2011	Mount Lemmon	Mount Lemmon Survey	MAS	540 m	MPC · JPL
751798	2015 GK_{65}	—	January 2, 2009	Kitt Peak	Spacewatch	KOR	1.1 km	MPC · JPL
751799	2015 GN_{65}	—	April 10, 2015	Haleakala	Pan-STARRS 1	L4	6.7 km	MPC · JPL
751800	2015 GY_{68}	—	January 22, 2015	Haleakala	Pan-STARRS 1	·	1.4 km	MPC · JPL

== 751801–751900 ==
back to top

Designation			Discovery			Properties		Ref
Permanent	Provisional	Named after	Date	Site	Discoverer(s)	Category	Diam.	Ref
751801	2015 HG_{4}	—	January 20, 2015	Haleakala	Pan-STARRS 1	·	2.0 km	MPC · JPL
751802	2015 HL_{4}	—	January 20, 2015	Haleakala	Pan-STARRS 1	·	2.6 km	MPC · JPL
751803	2015 HW_{4}	—	July 3, 2005	Palomar	NEAT	·	2.7 km	MPC · JPL
751804	2015 HY_{6}	—	March 18, 2015	Haleakala	Pan-STARRS 1	·	2.7 km	MPC · JPL
751805	2015 HN_{11}	—	April 17, 2015	Catalina	CSS	H	450 m	MPC · JPL
751806	2015 HL_{13}	—	September 20, 2011	Kitt Peak	Spacewatch	·	2.4 km	MPC · JPL
751807	2015 HN_{16}	—	September 14, 2009	Kitt Peak	Spacewatch	V	490 m	MPC · JPL
751808	2015 HT_{17}	—	October 23, 2013	Mount Lemmon	Mount Lemmon Survey	·	520 m	MPC · JPL
751809	2015 HW_{22}	—	March 22, 2015	Haleakala	Pan-STARRS 1	·	2.2 km	MPC · JPL
751810	2015 HU_{24}	—	January 28, 2015	Haleakala	Pan-STARRS 1	·	2.6 km	MPC · JPL
751811	2015 HX_{24}	—	March 27, 2015	Kitt Peak	Spacewatch	L4	7.1 km	MPC · JPL
751812	2015 HA_{26}	—	September 19, 2006	Catalina	CSS	·	3.3 km	MPC · JPL
751813	2015 HP_{30}	—	April 16, 2015	Mount Lemmon	Mount Lemmon Survey	·	1.2 km	MPC · JPL
751814	2015 HZ_{30}	—	August 15, 2009	Kitt Peak	Spacewatch	·	580 m	MPC · JPL
751815	2015 HJ_{31}	—	November 27, 2013	Haleakala	Pan-STARRS 1	·	600 m	MPC · JPL
751816	2015 HE_{33}	—	May 13, 2008	Mount Lemmon	Mount Lemmon Survey	·	920 m	MPC · JPL
751817	2015 HO_{33}	—	February 23, 2015	Haleakala	Pan-STARRS 1	·	910 m	MPC · JPL
751818	2015 HB_{36}	—	May 3, 2008	Mount Lemmon	Mount Lemmon Survey	V	580 m	MPC · JPL
751819	2015 HD_{37}	—	April 13, 2004	Kitt Peak	Spacewatch	·	970 m	MPC · JPL
751820	2015 HS_{44}	—	December 14, 2010	Mount Lemmon	Mount Lemmon Survey	·	610 m	MPC · JPL
751821	2015 HD_{46}	—	November 9, 2013	Kitt Peak	Spacewatch	·	630 m	MPC · JPL
751822	2015 HD_{47}	—	March 25, 2015	Haleakala	Pan-STARRS 1	·	940 m	MPC · JPL
751823	2015 HJ_{50}	—	April 16, 2015	Haleakala	Pan-STARRS 1	·	2.4 km	MPC · JPL
751824	2015 HN_{50}	—	February 23, 2015	Haleakala	Pan-STARRS 1	·	2.4 km	MPC · JPL
751825	2015 HV_{50}	—	September 15, 2004	Kitt Peak	Spacewatch	·	1.3 km	MPC · JPL
751826	2015 HA_{52}	—	March 4, 2011	Mount Lemmon	Mount Lemmon Survey	V	520 m	MPC · JPL
751827	2015 HK_{53}	—	January 28, 2015	Haleakala	Pan-STARRS 1	·	2.2 km	MPC · JPL
751828	2015 HR_{53}	—	March 18, 2001	Kitt Peak	Spacewatch	·	650 m	MPC · JPL
751829	2015 HC_{56}	—	April 18, 2015	Haleakala	Pan-STARRS 1	PHO	770 m	MPC · JPL
751830	2015 HU_{56}	—	September 18, 2012	Mount Lemmon	Mount Lemmon Survey	·	890 m	MPC · JPL
751831	2015 HR_{57}	—	April 18, 2015	Haleakala	Pan-STARRS 1	·	740 m	MPC · JPL
751832	2015 HN_{58}	—	February 12, 2011	Mount Lemmon	Mount Lemmon Survey	·	800 m	MPC · JPL
751833	2015 HJ_{62}	—	February 10, 2011	Mount Lemmon	Mount Lemmon Survey	·	720 m	MPC · JPL
751834	2015 HM_{62}	—	January 28, 2015	Haleakala	Pan-STARRS 1	·	1.2 km	MPC · JPL
751835	2015 HJ_{63}	—	February 25, 2011	Mount Lemmon	Mount Lemmon Survey	·	830 m	MPC · JPL
751836	2015 HD_{64}	—	February 25, 2011	Mount Lemmon	Mount Lemmon Survey	MAS	610 m	MPC · JPL
751837	2015 HX_{64}	—	May 14, 2004	Kitt Peak	Spacewatch	MAS	700 m	MPC · JPL
751838	2015 HM_{65}	—	February 19, 2009	Kitt Peak	Spacewatch	THM	1.7 km	MPC · JPL
751839	2015 HP_{66}	—	April 1, 2015	Haleakala	Pan-STARRS 1	·	900 m	MPC · JPL
751840	2015 HO_{68}	—	August 2, 2011	Haleakala	Pan-STARRS 1	EOS	1.2 km	MPC · JPL
751841	2015 HA_{70}	—	December 6, 2013	Haleakala	Pan-STARRS 1	·	1.3 km	MPC · JPL
751842	2015 HK_{71}	—	April 23, 2015	Haleakala	Pan-STARRS 1	MAS	520 m	MPC · JPL
751843	2015 HS_{73}	—	December 21, 2003	Kitt Peak	Spacewatch	·	1.3 km	MPC · JPL
751844	2015 HU_{76}	—	September 28, 2013	Mount Lemmon	Mount Lemmon Survey	PHO	890 m	MPC · JPL
751845	2015 HJ_{77}	—	April 23, 2015	Haleakala	Pan-STARRS 1	·	2.5 km	MPC · JPL
751846	2015 HF_{80}	—	January 27, 2007	Kitt Peak	Spacewatch	NYS	1.0 km	MPC · JPL
751847	2015 HK_{84}	—	January 16, 2007	Mount Lemmon	Mount Lemmon Survey	·	930 m	MPC · JPL
751848	2015 HK_{87}	—	October 21, 2006	Mount Lemmon	Mount Lemmon Survey	·	610 m	MPC · JPL
751849	2015 HP_{87}	—	May 24, 2011	Haleakala	Pan-STARRS 1	·	1.1 km	MPC · JPL
751850	2015 HN_{89}	—	October 19, 2011	Mount Lemmon	Mount Lemmon Survey	·	2.6 km	MPC · JPL
751851	2015 HY_{90}	—	April 23, 2015	Haleakala	Pan-STARRS 1	·	800 m	MPC · JPL
751852	2015 HD_{93}	—	June 12, 2008	Kitt Peak	Spacewatch	·	820 m	MPC · JPL
751853	2015 HQ_{95}	—	September 29, 2009	Kitt Peak	Spacewatch	·	510 m	MPC · JPL
751854	2015 HE_{97}	—	August 14, 2012	Haleakala	Pan-STARRS 1	MAS	570 m	MPC · JPL
751855	2015 HJ_{102}	—	February 9, 2010	Mount Lemmon	Mount Lemmon Survey	·	1.0 km	MPC · JPL
751856	2015 HO_{103}	—	March 22, 2015	Haleakala	Pan-STARRS 1	·	1 km	MPC · JPL
751857	2015 HN_{106}	—	September 6, 2008	Mount Lemmon	Mount Lemmon Survey	MAR	870 m	MPC · JPL
751858	2015 HC_{109}	—	April 13, 2015	Haleakala	Pan-STARRS 1	·	840 m	MPC · JPL
751859	2015 HF_{109}	—	January 28, 2015	Haleakala	Pan-STARRS 1	·	790 m	MPC · JPL
751860	2015 HP_{117}	—	April 22, 2015	Haute Provence	J. Jahn	·	990 m	MPC · JPL
751861	2015 HR_{117}	—	April 25, 2015	Haleakala	Pan-STARRS 1	·	960 m	MPC · JPL
751862	2015 HG_{120}	—	March 26, 2015	Kitt Peak	Spacewatch	·	590 m	MPC · JPL
751863	2015 HL_{124}	—	March 18, 2015	Haleakala	Pan-STARRS 1	·	900 m	MPC · JPL
751864	2015 HS_{126}	—	October 31, 2006	Mount Lemmon	Mount Lemmon Survey	THM	1.9 km	MPC · JPL
751865	2015 HT_{132}	—	June 11, 2007	Mauna Kea	D. D. Balam, K. Perrett	L4	6.5 km	MPC · JPL
751866	2015 HC_{133}	—	April 11, 2015	Kitt Peak	Spacewatch	MAS	650 m	MPC · JPL
751867	2015 HD_{134}	—	October 17, 2012	Mount Lemmon	Mount Lemmon Survey	EOS	1.5 km	MPC · JPL
751868	2015 HG_{135}	—	September 24, 2009	Mount Lemmon	Mount Lemmon Survey	3:2 · SHU	4.4 km	MPC · JPL
751869	2015 HP_{135}	—	April 23, 2015	Haleakala	Pan-STARRS 1	·	740 m	MPC · JPL
751870	2015 HU_{136}	—	September 24, 2005	Kitt Peak	Spacewatch	V	480 m	MPC · JPL
751871	2015 HB_{138}	—	June 6, 2011	Haleakala	Pan-STARRS 1	·	940 m	MPC · JPL
751872	2015 HU_{138}	—	October 14, 2009	Mount Lemmon	Mount Lemmon Survey	·	1.1 km	MPC · JPL
751873	2015 HA_{140}	—	April 30, 2011	Mount Lemmon	Mount Lemmon Survey	·	940 m	MPC · JPL
751874	2015 HS_{140}	—	April 23, 2015	Haleakala	Pan-STARRS 1	PHO	670 m	MPC · JPL
751875	2015 HR_{143}	—	October 11, 2012	Haleakala	Pan-STARRS 1	·	960 m	MPC · JPL
751876	2015 HC_{145}	—	April 23, 2015	Haleakala	Pan-STARRS 1	·	930 m	MPC · JPL
751877	2015 HF_{146}	—	November 12, 2005	Kitt Peak	Spacewatch	·	1.1 km	MPC · JPL
751878	2015 HS_{148}	—	September 19, 2012	Mount Lemmon	Mount Lemmon Survey	EUN	790 m	MPC · JPL
751879	2015 HV_{148}	—	October 27, 2013	Mount Lemmon	Mount Lemmon Survey	·	1.1 km	MPC · JPL
751880	2015 HG_{151}	—	October 2, 2003	Kitt Peak	Spacewatch	·	1.3 km	MPC · JPL
751881	2015 HJ_{152}	—	May 22, 2011	Mount Lemmon	Mount Lemmon Survey	·	640 m	MPC · JPL
751882	2015 HM_{153}	—	April 23, 2015	Haleakala	Pan-STARRS 1	·	920 m	MPC · JPL
751883	2015 HY_{161}	—	October 14, 2012	Kitt Peak	Spacewatch	MIS	1.9 km	MPC · JPL
751884	2015 HC_{166}	—	April 23, 2011	Haleakala	Pan-STARRS 1	NYS	1.0 km	MPC · JPL
751885	2015 HU_{169}	—	March 30, 2011	Haleakala	Pan-STARRS 1	·	930 m	MPC · JPL
751886	2015 HM_{171}	—	December 24, 2011	Mount Lemmon	Mount Lemmon Survey	H	590 m	MPC · JPL
751887	2015 HP_{172}	—	January 31, 2015	Haleakala	Pan-STARRS 1	·	2.5 km	MPC · JPL
751888	2015 HR_{172}	—	January 11, 2011	Kitt Peak	Spacewatch	·	1.1 km	MPC · JPL
751889	2015 HK_{175}	—	May 21, 2011	Haleakala	Pan-STARRS 1	·	800 m	MPC · JPL
751890	2015 HP_{176}	—	March 17, 2015	Haleakala	Pan-STARRS 1	·	2.7 km	MPC · JPL
751891	2015 HS_{179}	—	March 19, 2015	Haleakala	Pan-STARRS 1	·	940 m	MPC · JPL
751892	2015 HZ_{179}	—	November 28, 2013	Kitt Peak	Spacewatch	·	1.3 km	MPC · JPL
751893	2015 HQ_{183}	—	January 20, 2012	Catalina	CSS	H	510 m	MPC · JPL
751894	2015 HH_{184}	—	April 20, 2015	Haleakala	Pan-STARRS 1	H	490 m	MPC · JPL
751895	2015 HA_{185}	—	October 22, 2012	Mount Lemmon	Mount Lemmon Survey	·	2.5 km	MPC · JPL
751896	2015 HC_{186}	—	February 9, 2007	Kitt Peak	Spacewatch	·	900 m	MPC · JPL
751897	2015 HD_{186}	—	December 24, 2006	Kitt Peak	Spacewatch	·	1.1 km	MPC · JPL
751898	2015 HM_{188}	—	January 22, 2015	Haleakala	Pan-STARRS 1	·	2.3 km	MPC · JPL
751899	2015 HH_{189}	—	April 18, 2015	Haleakala	Pan-STARRS 1	·	2.8 km	MPC · JPL
751900	2015 HC_{190}	—	May 13, 2011	Mount Lemmon	Mount Lemmon Survey	·	820 m	MPC · JPL

== 751901–752000 ==
back to top

Designation			Discovery			Properties		Ref
Permanent	Provisional	Named after	Date	Site	Discoverer(s)	Category	Diam.	Ref
751901	2015 HH_{190}	—	September 3, 2008	Kitt Peak	Spacewatch	V	580 m	MPC · JPL
751902	2015 HN_{190}	—	December 14, 2013	Mount Lemmon	Mount Lemmon Survey	V	630 m	MPC · JPL
751903	2015 HD_{191}	—	October 22, 2008	Kitt Peak	Spacewatch	·	840 m	MPC · JPL
751904	2015 HX_{191}	—	June 5, 2011	Mount Lemmon	Mount Lemmon Survey	·	890 m	MPC · JPL
751905	2015 HT_{192}	—	April 24, 2015	Haleakala	Pan-STARRS 1	·	1.1 km	MPC · JPL
751906	2015 HJ_{193}	—	March 22, 2015	Mount Lemmon	Mount Lemmon Survey	MAS	710 m	MPC · JPL
751907	2015 HX_{196}	—	April 18, 2015	Mount Lemmon	Mount Lemmon Survey	H	460 m	MPC · JPL
751908	2015 HF_{201}	—	April 23, 2015	Haleakala	Pan-STARRS 1	JUN	730 m	MPC · JPL
751909	2015 HD_{203}	—	April 23, 2015	Catalina	CSS	·	1.0 km	MPC · JPL
751910	2015 HW_{208}	—	April 23, 2015	Haleakala	Pan-STARRS 1	MAR	680 m	MPC · JPL
751911	2015 HF_{209}	—	April 18, 2015	Haleakala	Pan-STARRS 1	·	2.9 km	MPC · JPL
751912	2015 HU_{210}	—	April 23, 2015	Haleakala	Pan-STARRS 1	HYG	2.3 km	MPC · JPL
751913	2015 HW_{212}	—	April 18, 2015	Haleakala	Pan-STARRS 1	·	920 m	MPC · JPL
751914	2015 HE_{213}	—	April 25, 2015	Haleakala	Pan-STARRS 1	·	2.2 km	MPC · JPL
751915	2015 HV_{215}	—	April 18, 2015	Haleakala	Pan-STARRS 1	·	1.0 km	MPC · JPL
751916	2015 HV_{216}	—	April 23, 2015	Haleakala	Pan-STARRS 1	·	990 m	MPC · JPL
751917	2015 HR_{221}	—	April 23, 2015	Haleakala	Pan-STARRS 1	T_{j} (2.94) · 3:2	4.4 km	MPC · JPL
751918	2015 HE_{227}	—	April 25, 2015	Haleakala	Pan-STARRS 1	·	1.1 km	MPC · JPL
751919	2015 HE_{233}	—	April 18, 2015	Cerro Tololo	DECam	·	2.4 km	MPC · JPL
751920	2015 HP_{298}	—	April 19, 2015	Cerro Tololo	DECam	·	1.4 km	MPC · JPL
751921	2015 JL_{1}	—	January 28, 2015	Haleakala	Pan-STARRS 1	BAR	990 m	MPC · JPL
751922	2015 JK_{6}	—	January 27, 2007	Mount Lemmon	Mount Lemmon Survey	·	1.0 km	MPC · JPL
751923	2015 JS_{6}	—	April 24, 2015	Haleakala	Pan-STARRS 1	·	1.2 km	MPC · JPL
751924	2015 JO_{8}	—	October 31, 2005	Mount Lemmon	Mount Lemmon Survey	H	380 m	MPC · JPL
751925	2015 JJ_{9}	—	August 26, 2012	Kitt Peak	Spacewatch	V	560 m	MPC · JPL
751926	2015 JN_{9}	—	October 21, 2007	Mount Lemmon	Mount Lemmon Survey	·	950 m	MPC · JPL
751927	2015 JT_{9}	—	March 21, 2015	Haleakala	Pan-STARRS 1	·	990 m	MPC · JPL
751928	2015 JV_{10}	—	May 15, 2015	Haleakala	Pan-STARRS 1	EUN	900 m	MPC · JPL
751929	2015 JM_{11}	—	November 26, 2014	Haleakala	Pan-STARRS 1	H	520 m	MPC · JPL
751930	2015 JG_{12}	—	May 9, 2015	Cerro Paranal	Altmann, M., Prusti, T.	·	950 m	MPC · JPL
751931	2015 JU_{13}	—	May 25, 2007	Mount Lemmon	Mount Lemmon Survey	·	740 m	MPC · JPL
751932	2015 JG_{14}	—	October 24, 2009	Kitt Peak	Spacewatch	·	1.3 km	MPC · JPL
751933	2015 JU_{19}	—	May 11, 2015	Mount Lemmon	Mount Lemmon Survey	·	1.7 km	MPC · JPL
751934	2015 JE_{22}	—	May 15, 2015	Haleakala	Pan-STARRS 1	·	1.2 km	MPC · JPL
751935	2015 JZ_{22}	—	May 11, 2015	Mount Lemmon	Mount Lemmon Survey	·	830 m	MPC · JPL
751936	2015 JT_{25}	—	May 12, 2015	Mount Lemmon	Mount Lemmon Survey	·	1.4 km	MPC · JPL
751937	2015 KY_{1}	—	March 25, 2015	Mount Lemmon	Mount Lemmon Survey	·	670 m	MPC · JPL
751938	2015 KM_{2}	—	December 20, 2014	Haleakala	Pan-STARRS 1	H	410 m	MPC · JPL
751939	2015 KV_{2}	—	January 28, 2015	Haleakala	Pan-STARRS 1	·	1.1 km	MPC · JPL
751940	2015 KX_{4}	—	January 31, 2015	Haleakala	Pan-STARRS 1	·	2.4 km	MPC · JPL
751941	2015 KA_{5}	—	May 18, 2015	Haleakala	Pan-STARRS 1	·	1 km	MPC · JPL
751942	2015 KX_{5}	—	September 20, 2011	Haleakala	Pan-STARRS 1	·	2.6 km	MPC · JPL
751943	2015 KD_{8}	—	May 1, 2015	Mount Lemmon	Mount Lemmon Survey	·	2.6 km	MPC · JPL
751944	2015 KJ_{8}	—	April 13, 2015	Haleakala	Pan-STARRS 1	·	830 m	MPC · JPL
751945	2015 KK_{9}	—	March 22, 2009	Catalina	CSS	EOS	1.5 km	MPC · JPL
751946	2015 KA_{11}	—	September 8, 2007	Mount Lemmon	Mount Lemmon Survey	JUN	700 m	MPC · JPL
751947	2015 KS_{11}	—	May 18, 2015	Haleakala	Pan-STARRS 1	·	1.1 km	MPC · JPL
751948	2015 KX_{12}	—	March 28, 2015	Haleakala	Pan-STARRS 1	BRG	970 m	MPC · JPL
751949	2015 KZ_{18}	—	October 23, 2013	Haleakala	Pan-STARRS 1	H	410 m	MPC · JPL
751950	2015 KD_{20}	—	February 25, 2006	Kitt Peak	Spacewatch	·	1.0 km	MPC · JPL
751951	2015 KH_{20}	—	October 26, 2008	Kitt Peak	Spacewatch	MAR	900 m	MPC · JPL
751952	2015 KA_{21}	—	March 21, 2015	Haleakala	Pan-STARRS 1	·	810 m	MPC · JPL
751953	2015 KJ_{23}	—	February 5, 2000	Kitt Peak	Spacewatch	·	730 m	MPC · JPL
751954	2015 KJ_{29}	—	March 28, 2004	Kitt Peak	Spacewatch	·	880 m	MPC · JPL
751955	2015 KL_{29}	—	September 26, 2013	Mount Lemmon	Mount Lemmon Survey	H	400 m	MPC · JPL
751956	2015 KQ_{29}	—	May 12, 2015	Mount Lemmon	Mount Lemmon Survey	HYG	2.2 km	MPC · JPL
751957	2015 KQ_{31}	—	May 10, 2015	Mount Lemmon	Mount Lemmon Survey	(5)	750 m	MPC · JPL
751958	2015 KC_{32}	—	May 10, 2015	Mount Lemmon	Mount Lemmon Survey	·	870 m	MPC · JPL
751959	2015 KG_{33}	—	May 12, 2015	Mount Lemmon	Mount Lemmon Survey	·	650 m	MPC · JPL
751960	2015 KN_{33}	—	September 21, 2003	Kitt Peak	Spacewatch	·	960 m	MPC · JPL
751961	2015 KH_{34}	—	October 16, 2003	Kitt Peak	Spacewatch	·	1.7 km	MPC · JPL
751962	2015 KF_{36}	—	May 19, 2015	Haleakala	Pan-STARRS 1	·	1.5 km	MPC · JPL
751963	2015 KP_{36}	—	May 19, 2015	Haleakala	Pan-STARRS 1	·	1.1 km	MPC · JPL
751964	2015 KQ_{36}	—	May 19, 2015	Haleakala	Pan-STARRS 1	·	1.1 km	MPC · JPL
751965	2015 KE_{37}	—	October 21, 2012	Mount Lemmon	Mount Lemmon Survey	V	560 m	MPC · JPL
751966	2015 KQ_{38}	—	June 10, 2011	Mount Lemmon	Mount Lemmon Survey	·	870 m	MPC · JPL
751967	2015 KX_{40}	—	January 27, 2007	Mount Lemmon	Mount Lemmon Survey	NYS	850 m	MPC · JPL
751968	2015 KE_{43}	—	September 17, 2012	Mount Lemmon	Mount Lemmon Survey	·	680 m	MPC · JPL
751969	2015 KJ_{43}	—	October 9, 2012	Mount Lemmon	Mount Lemmon Survey	MAS	530 m	MPC · JPL
751970	2015 KU_{44}	—	February 25, 2011	Mount Lemmon	Mount Lemmon Survey	MAS	520 m	MPC · JPL
751971	2015 KS_{46}	—	May 20, 2015	Haleakala	Pan-STARRS 1	·	860 m	MPC · JPL
751972	2015 KF_{47}	—	March 5, 2002	Anderson Mesa	LONEOS	·	1.0 km	MPC · JPL
751973	2015 KZ_{47}	—	May 20, 2015	Haleakala	Pan-STARRS 1	·	990 m	MPC · JPL
751974	2015 KQ_{48}	—	May 20, 2015	Haleakala	Pan-STARRS 1	·	2.2 km	MPC · JPL
751975	2015 KS_{49}	—	October 16, 2012	Mount Lemmon	Mount Lemmon Survey	·	790 m	MPC · JPL
751976	2015 KU_{49}	—	May 20, 2015	Haleakala	Pan-STARRS 1	·	920 m	MPC · JPL
751977	2015 KH_{50}	—	March 5, 2011	Dauban	C. Rinner, Kugel, F.	·	910 m	MPC · JPL
751978	2015 KY_{53}	—	January 3, 2014	Catalina	CSS	·	1.1 km	MPC · JPL
751979	2015 KB_{56}	—	June 27, 2011	Mount Lemmon	Mount Lemmon Survey	·	990 m	MPC · JPL
751980	2015 KE_{60}	—	April 25, 2015	Haleakala	Pan-STARRS 1	EUN	1.1 km	MPC · JPL
751981	2015 KN_{62}	—	May 11, 2015	Mount Lemmon	Mount Lemmon Survey	·	980 m	MPC · JPL
751982	2015 KN_{64}	—	April 2, 2011	Mount Lemmon	Mount Lemmon Survey	·	960 m	MPC · JPL
751983	2015 KX_{69}	—	September 24, 2008	Mount Lemmon	Mount Lemmon Survey	·	990 m	MPC · JPL
751984	2015 KS_{70}	—	May 21, 2015	Haleakala	Pan-STARRS 1	·	930 m	MPC · JPL
751985	2015 KT_{80}	—	May 21, 2015	Haleakala	Pan-STARRS 1	·	1.0 km	MPC · JPL
751986	2015 KG_{83}	—	May 21, 2015	Haleakala	Pan-STARRS 1	·	1.0 km	MPC · JPL
751987	2015 KZ_{84}	—	March 28, 2015	Haleakala	Pan-STARRS 1	·	800 m	MPC · JPL
751988	2015 KH_{87}	—	May 18, 2015	Mount Lemmon	Mount Lemmon Survey	·	1.0 km	MPC · JPL
751989	2015 KR_{90}	—	March 31, 2015	Haleakala	Pan-STARRS 1	·	590 m	MPC · JPL
751990	2015 KM_{91}	—	August 26, 2012	Haleakala	Pan-STARRS 1	·	780 m	MPC · JPL
751991	2015 KQ_{91}	—	May 21, 2015	Haleakala	Pan-STARRS 1	·	1.0 km	MPC · JPL
751992	2015 KD_{93}	—	September 20, 2011	Kitt Peak	Spacewatch	·	1.8 km	MPC · JPL
751993	2015 KX_{95}	—	July 30, 2008	Mount Lemmon	Mount Lemmon Survey	·	1.1 km	MPC · JPL
751994	2015 KK_{99}	—	December 31, 2013	Kitt Peak	Spacewatch	·	1.1 km	MPC · JPL
751995	2015 KR_{102}	—	May 21, 2015	Haleakala	Pan-STARRS 1	·	830 m	MPC · JPL
751996	2015 KW_{103}	—	September 13, 2007	Catalina	CSS	·	1.7 km	MPC · JPL
751997	2015 KM_{104}	—	June 6, 2011	Mount Lemmon	Mount Lemmon Survey	·	840 m	MPC · JPL
751998	2015 KB_{106}	—	March 16, 2007	Kitt Peak	Spacewatch	V	590 m	MPC · JPL
751999	2015 KM_{106}	—	May 21, 2015	Haleakala	Pan-STARRS 1	·	1.2 km	MPC · JPL
752000	2015 KK_{108}	—	December 22, 2008	Kitt Peak	Spacewatch	·	1.2 km	MPC · JPL

back to top

== Meaning of names ==
As minor planet discoveries are confirmed, they are given a permanent number by the IAU's Minor Planet Center (MPC), and the discoverers can then submit names for them, following the IAU's naming conventions. The list below concerns those minor planets in the specified number-range that have received names, and explains the meanings of those names.

Official naming citations of newly named small Solar System bodies are approved and published in a bulletin by IAU's Working Group for Small Bodies Nomenclature (WGSBN). Before May 2021, citations were published in MPC's Minor Planet Circulars for many decades. Recent citations can also be found on the JPL Small-Body Database (SBDB). Until his death in 2016, German astronomer Lutz D. Schmadel compiled these citations into the Dictionary of Minor Planet Names (DMP) and regularly updated the collection.

Based on Paul Herget's The Names of the Minor Planets, Schmadel also researched the unclear origin of numerous asteroids, most of which had been named prior to World War II. This article incorporates text from this source, which is in the public domain: SBDB New namings may only be added to this list below after official publication as the preannouncement of names is condemned. The WGSBN publishes a comprehensive guideline for the naming rules of non-cometary small Solar System bodies.

Named minor planet	Provisional	This minor planet was named for...	Ref · Catalog
751385 Zachwatowicz	2015 CN_{64}	Krystyna Zachwatowicz-Wajda, Polish film and theater set designer, costume designer and actress.	IAU · 751385
