= 2623 Zech =

Main-belt asteroid binary

Discovery
- Discovered by: K. Reinmuth
- Discovery site: Heidelberg Obs.
- Discovery date: 22 September 1919

Designations
- Named after: Gert Zech (ARI astronomer)
- Alternative designations: A919 SA · 1963 RE
- Minor planet category: main-belt · (inner)

Orbital characteristics
- Epoch 4 September 2017 (JD 2458000.5)
- Uncertainty parameter 0
- Observation arc: 97.70 yr (35,684 days)
- Aphelion: 2.7846 AU
- Perihelion: 1.7243 AU
- Semi-major axis: 2.2545 AU
- Eccentricity: 0.2352
- Orbital period (sidereal): 3.39 yr (1,236 days)
- Mean anomaly: 324.18°
- Mean motion: 0° 17^{m} 28.32^{s} / day
- Inclination: 4.0548°
- Longitude of ascending node: 349.11°
- Argument of perihelion: 22.883°
- Known satellites: 1

Physical characteristics
- Dimensions: 6.50 km (calculated); 7.61 km (estimate)
- Synodic rotation period: 2.7401±0.0002 h
- Geometric albedo: 0.20 (assumed)
- Spectral type: S
- Absolute magnitude (H): 13.13±0.59 · 13.3

2623 Zech, provisional designation A919 SA, is a stony binary asteroid from the inner regions of the asteroid belt, approximately 6.5 kilometers in diameter. It was discovered on 22 September 1919, by German astronomer Karl Reinmuth at Heidelberg Observatory in southwest Germany. It was named after German ARI astronomer Gert Zech.

== Orbit ==
Zech is a stony S-type asteroid that orbits the Sun in the inner main-belt at a distance of 1.7–2.8 AU once every 3 years and 5 months (1,236 days). Its orbit has an eccentricity of 0.24 and an inclination of 4° with respect to the ecliptic. The body's observation arc begins with its official discovery observation, as no precoveries were taken, and no prior identifications were made. On 8 June 2002, Zech passed 0.036 AU (5,400,000 km) from the major asteroid 3 Juno.

== Diameter ==
While "Johnston's Archive" estimates a diameter of 7.61 kilometers for Zech, the Collaborative Asteroid Lightcurve Link assumes a standard albedo for stony asteroids of 0.20 and calculates a diameter of 6.5 kilometers based on an absolute magnitude of 13.3. No observational results have been published by the space-based IRAS, Akari, and WISE/NEOWISE surveys.

== Binary system ==
=== Primary ===
In October 2004, a rotational lightcurve of Zech was obtained from photometric observations by American astronomer Donald P. Pray at Sugarloaf Mountain Observatory, Massachusetts, in a collaboration with other American and European astronomers from France, the Czech Republic, Serbia, Georgia and Ukraine. Lightcurve analysis gave a rotation period of 2.7401 hours with a brightness variation of 0.22 magnitude (U=n.a.). While not being a fast rotator, it has a relatively fast spin rate for its size, as most minor planets rotate between 2.2 and 20 hours.

=== Moon ===
During Pray's photometric observations, it was revealed that Zech (primary) is in fact an asynchronous binary asteroid with a minor planet moon orbiting it. The moon has an orbital period of 117.2 hours and a spin rate of 18.718 hours with an amplitude 0.08 magnitude. Based on Pray's secondary-to-primary mean diameter ratio (D_{s}/_{p}) of more than 0.29, the Johnston's Archive estimates a diameter of at least 2.21 kilometers for Zech's companion.

== Naming ==
This minor planet was named after German astronomer Gert Zech (born 1941) at ARI in Heidelberg. He was editor of Astronomy and Astrophysics Abstracts and is known for his publications on the observational determination of the length of the astronomical unit and the mass of the Earth–Moon system using the dynamical method by observing the near-Earth object 433 Eros. Naming citation was prepared by Lutz D. Schmadel who also proposed the name. The citation was published on 18 February 1992 (M.P.C. 19692).
