= List of minor planets: 756001–757000 =

The following is a partial list of minor planets, running from minor-planet number 756001 through 757000, inclusive. The primary data for this and other partial lists is based on JPL's "Small-Body Orbital Elements" and data available from the Minor Planet Center. Critical list information is also provided by the MPC, unless otherwise specified from Lowell Observatory. A detailed description of the table's columns and additional sources are given on the main page including a complete list of every page in this series, and a statistical break-up on the dynamical classification of minor planets.

Also see the summary list of all named bodies in numerical and alphabetical order, and the corresponding naming citations for the number range of this particular list. New namings may only be added to this list after official publication, as the preannouncement of names is condemned by the Working Group for Small Bodies Nomenclature of the International Astronomical Union.

Near-Earth obj.	MBA (inner)	MBA (outer)	Centaur
Mars-crosser	MBA (middle)	Jupiter trojan	Trans-Neptunian obj.
Unclassified

== 756001–756100 ==
Designation			Discovery			Properties		Ref
Permanent	Provisional	Named after	Date	Site	Discoverer(s)	Category	Diam.	Ref
756001	2017 XJ_{73}	—	December 12, 2017	Haleakala	Pan-STARRS 1	·	1.0 km	MPC · JPL
756002	2017 XP_{73}	—	December 12, 2017	Haleakala	Pan-STARRS 1	·	880 m	MPC · JPL
756003	2017 XV_{74}	—	December 14, 2017	Mount Lemmon	Mount Lemmon Survey	V	470 m	MPC · JPL
756004	2017 XY_{83}	—	January 31, 2015	Haleakala	Pan-STARRS 1	MAR	930 m	MPC · JPL
756005	2017 YJ_{6}	—	January 27, 2014	Mayhill-ISON	L. Elenin	·	1.7 km	MPC · JPL
756006	2017 YK_{6}	—	April 1, 2016	Haleakala	Pan-STARRS 1	H	430 m	MPC · JPL
756007	2017 YG_{13}	—	November 30, 2010	Mount Lemmon	Mount Lemmon Survey	·	700 m	MPC · JPL
756008	2017 YY_{19}	—	December 28, 2017	Mount Lemmon	Mount Lemmon Survey	(194)	1.5 km	MPC · JPL
756009	2017 YR_{26}	—	December 26, 2017	Mount Lemmon	Mount Lemmon Survey	L5	8.7 km	MPC · JPL
756010	2017 YM_{27}	—	December 24, 2017	Haleakala	Pan-STARRS 1	·	990 m	MPC · JPL
756011	2017 YQ_{28}	—	December 26, 2017	Mount Lemmon	Mount Lemmon Survey	·	1.8 km	MPC · JPL
756012	2017 YX_{35}	—	December 28, 2017	Haleakala	Pan-STARRS 1	·	1.9 km	MPC · JPL
756013	2017 YH_{46}	—	February 4, 2005	Kitt Peak	Spacewatch	HNS	940 m	MPC · JPL
756014	2017 YQ_{58}	—	April 24, 2014	Cerro Tololo	DECam	·	2.0 km	MPC · JPL
756015	2017 YH_{68}	—	February 3, 2009	Kitt Peak	Spacewatch	·	1.6 km	MPC · JPL
756016	2018 AY_{6}	—	December 14, 2010	Mount Lemmon	Mount Lemmon Survey	·	590 m	MPC · JPL
756017	2018 AE_{9}	—	November 14, 2017	Mount Lemmon	Mount Lemmon Survey	·	1.4 km	MPC · JPL
756018	2018 AS_{9}	—	December 31, 2013	Mount Lemmon	Mount Lemmon Survey	·	1.0 km	MPC · JPL
756019	2018 AT_{15}	—	September 26, 2006	Mount Lemmon	Mount Lemmon Survey	·	560 m	MPC · JPL
756020	2018 AB_{16}	—	July 5, 2016	Haleakala	Pan-STARRS 1	PHO	680 m	MPC · JPL
756021	2018 AR_{18}	—	November 3, 2005	Mount Lemmon	Mount Lemmon Survey	·	1.1 km	MPC · JPL
756022	2018 AA_{21}	—	January 12, 2018	Mount Lemmon	Mount Lemmon Survey	·	1.1 km	MPC · JPL
756023	2018 AP_{22}	—	March 11, 2014	Mount Lemmon	Mount Lemmon Survey	·	1.0 km	MPC · JPL
756024	2018 AA_{27}	—	January 14, 2018	Mount Lemmon	Mount Lemmon Survey	T_{j} (2.97) · 3:2	4.6 km	MPC · JPL
756025	2018 AF_{28}	—	January 11, 2018	Haleakala	Pan-STARRS 1	·	1.2 km	MPC · JPL
756026	2018 AM_{29}	—	January 12, 2018	Mount Lemmon	Mount Lemmon Survey	ERI	1.2 km	MPC · JPL
756027	2018 AW_{29}	—	April 18, 2015	Cerro Tololo	DECam	·	760 m	MPC · JPL
756028	2018 AX_{29}	—	January 11, 2018	Haleakala	Pan-STARRS 1	·	970 m	MPC · JPL
756029	2018 AL_{30}	—	January 14, 2018	Haleakala	Pan-STARRS 1	·	780 m	MPC · JPL
756030	2018 AQ_{32}	—	March 14, 2010	Mount Lemmon	Mount Lemmon Survey	·	860 m	MPC · JPL
756031	2018 AM_{33}	—	January 12, 2018	Haleakala	Pan-STARRS 1	HNS	700 m	MPC · JPL
756032	2018 AP_{34}	—	January 14, 2018	Mount Lemmon	Mount Lemmon Survey	MAR	1.0 km	MPC · JPL
756033	2018 AQ_{38}	—	January 12, 2018	Haleakala	Pan-STARRS 1	·	3.3 km	MPC · JPL
756034	2018 AV_{40}	—	January 14, 2018	Haleakala	Pan-STARRS 1	L5	6.6 km	MPC · JPL
756035	2018 AE_{46}	—	January 15, 2018	Haleakala	Pan-STARRS 1	L5	6.7 km	MPC · JPL
756036	2018 BD_{1}	—	January 15, 2013	Catalina	CSS	H	550 m	MPC · JPL
756037	2018 BP_{2}	—	July 25, 2011	Haleakala	Pan-STARRS 1	H	480 m	MPC · JPL
756038	2018 BS_{3}	—	February 9, 2005	Socorro	LINEAR	H	470 m	MPC · JPL
756039	2018 BX_{6}	—	December 6, 2007	Kitt Peak	Spacewatch	H	400 m	MPC · JPL
756040	2018 BV_{7}	—	September 17, 2009	Kitt Peak	Spacewatch	MAS	590 m	MPC · JPL
756041	2018 BZ_{9}	—	October 23, 2012	Kitt Peak	Spacewatch	·	2.0 km	MPC · JPL
756042	2018 BB_{11}	—	June 11, 2010	Mount Lemmon	Mount Lemmon Survey	HNS	1.2 km	MPC · JPL
756043	2018 BK_{12}	—	March 25, 2015	Mount Lemmon	Mount Lemmon Survey	·	630 m	MPC · JPL
756044	2018 BO_{12}	—	June 20, 2015	Haleakala	Pan-STARRS 2	·	1.2 km	MPC · JPL
756045	2018 BF_{18}	—	January 24, 2018	Mount Lemmon	Mount Lemmon Survey	H	440 m	MPC · JPL
756046	2018 BX_{21}	—	January 16, 2018	Haleakala	Pan-STARRS 1	·	1.7 km	MPC · JPL
756047	2018 CR	—	September 15, 2006	Kitt Peak	Spacewatch	·	830 m	MPC · JPL
756048	2018 CX_{3}	—	March 28, 2011	Mount Lemmon	Mount Lemmon Survey	·	740 m	MPC · JPL
756049	2018 CP_{4}	—	February 13, 2014	Haleakala	Pan-STARRS 1	BAR	1.1 km	MPC · JPL
756050	2018 CQ_{4}	—	March 16, 2004	Socorro	LINEAR	·	960 m	MPC · JPL
756051	2018 CK_{5}	—	October 11, 2012	Haleakala	Pan-STARRS 1	·	1.1 km	MPC · JPL
756052	2018 CQ_{5}	—	December 11, 2006	Catalina	CSS	PHO	810 m	MPC · JPL
756053	2018 CW_{7}	—	September 16, 2012	Mount Bigelow	CSS	JUN	1 km	MPC · JPL
756054	2018 CL_{10}	—	February 22, 2014	Catalina	CSS	·	1.5 km	MPC · JPL
756055	2018 CZ_{10}	—	October 17, 2009	Mount Lemmon	Mount Lemmon Survey	PHO	1.1 km	MPC · JPL
756056	2018 CO_{11}	—	March 29, 2008	Kitt Peak	Spacewatch	·	620 m	MPC · JPL
756057	2018 CJ_{13}	—	December 1, 2014	Haleakala	Pan-STARRS 1	H	450 m	MPC · JPL
756058	2018 CN_{14}	—	February 12, 2018	Haleakala	Pan-STARRS 1	H	430 m	MPC · JPL
756059	2018 CT_{18}	—	February 12, 2018	Haleakala	Pan-STARRS 1	·	910 m	MPC · JPL
756060	2018 CL_{20}	—	January 23, 2018	Mount Lemmon	Mount Lemmon Survey	·	1.0 km	MPC · JPL
756061	2018 CK_{21}	—	February 12, 2018	Haleakala	Pan-STARRS 1	·	1.1 km	MPC · JPL
756062	2018 CC_{32}	—	February 11, 2018	Haleakala	Pan-STARRS 1	L5	7.0 km	MPC · JPL
756063	2018 CY_{34}	—	February 5, 2018	Mount Lemmon	Mount Lemmon Survey	L5	8.0 km	MPC · JPL
756064	2018 DA_{1}	—	February 18, 2018	Mount Lemmon	Mount Lemmon Survey	APO · PHA	600 m	MPC · JPL
756065	2018 DH_{1}	—	February 22, 2018	XuYi	PMO NEO Survey Program	APO · PHA	210 m	MPC · JPL
756066	2018 DP_{2}	—	January 25, 2006	Kitt Peak	Spacewatch	MAR	810 m	MPC · JPL
756067	2018 DX_{6}	—	February 17, 2018	Mount Lemmon	Mount Lemmon Survey	·	960 m	MPC · JPL
756068	2018 DL_{7}	—	February 22, 2018	Mount Lemmon	Mount Lemmon Survey	·	880 m	MPC · JPL
756069	2018 ES	—	December 16, 2009	Catalina	CSS	H	440 m	MPC · JPL
756070	2018 EV_{4}	—	September 10, 2016	Mount Lemmon	Mount Lemmon Survey	·	1.8 km	MPC · JPL
756071	2018 EA_{5}	—	December 25, 2013	Mount Lemmon	Mount Lemmon Survey	·	860 m	MPC · JPL
756072	2018 EJ_{9}	—	February 28, 2014	Haleakala	Pan-STARRS 1	·	1.6 km	MPC · JPL
756073	2018 ER_{12}	—	March 14, 2011	Mount Lemmon	Mount Lemmon Survey	(2076)	680 m	MPC · JPL
756074	2018 FA_{5}	—	January 12, 2010	Catalina	CSS	H	420 m	MPC · JPL
756075	2018 FL_{6}	—	March 1, 2009	Kitt Peak	Spacewatch	·	1.5 km	MPC · JPL
756076	2018 FF_{7}	—	September 29, 2010	Mount Lemmon	Mount Lemmon Survey	·	2.0 km	MPC · JPL
756077	2018 FR_{10}	—	July 26, 2011	Haleakala	Pan-STARRS 1	·	920 m	MPC · JPL
756078	2018 FE_{14}	—	June 12, 2011	Mount Lemmon	Mount Lemmon Survey	·	1.0 km	MPC · JPL
756079	2018 FB_{15}	—	February 28, 2014	Haleakala	Pan-STARRS 1	·	710 m	MPC · JPL
756080	2018 FP_{17}	—	February 21, 2009	Mount Lemmon	Mount Lemmon Survey	·	1.2 km	MPC · JPL
756081	2018 FX_{17}	—	August 12, 2015	Haleakala	Pan-STARRS 1	·	1.3 km	MPC · JPL
756082	2018 FL_{21}	—	May 1, 2006	Mauna Kea	P. A. Wiegert	·	1.1 km	MPC · JPL
756083	2018 FP_{21}	—	May 21, 2014	Haleakala	Pan-STARRS 1	·	1.3 km	MPC · JPL
756084	2018 FV_{21}	—	January 19, 2013	Kitt Peak	Spacewatch	AGN	1.0 km	MPC · JPL
756085	2018 FN_{22}	—	February 28, 2014	Haleakala	Pan-STARRS 1	·	1.0 km	MPC · JPL
756086	2018 FX_{26}	—	March 14, 2013	Mount Lemmon	Mount Lemmon Survey	·	1.6 km	MPC · JPL
756087	2018 FK_{28}	—	January 28, 2009	Catalina	CSS	·	1.4 km	MPC · JPL
756088	2018 FX_{28}	—	March 18, 2018	Haleakala	Pan-STARRS 1	·	910 m	MPC · JPL
756089	2018 FR_{31}	—	February 14, 2004	Kitt Peak	Spacewatch	·	530 m	MPC · JPL
756090	2018 FW_{32}	—	October 21, 2016	Mount Lemmon	Mount Lemmon Survey	·	1.1 km	MPC · JPL
756091	2018 FB_{34}	—	March 17, 2018	Haleakala	Pan-STARRS 1	·	1.4 km	MPC · JPL
756092	2018 FX_{34}	—	March 18, 2018	Haleakala	Pan-STARRS 1	L5	8.2 km	MPC · JPL
756093	2018 FY_{34}	—	March 18, 2018	Haleakala	Pan-STARRS 1	L5	7.0 km	MPC · JPL
756094	2018 FG_{35}	—	January 25, 2009	Kitt Peak	Spacewatch	·	920 m	MPC · JPL
756095	2018 FH_{35}	—	March 28, 2018	Mount Lemmon	Mount Lemmon Survey	·	2.5 km	MPC · JPL
756096	2018 FR_{36}	—	April 24, 2014	Cerro Tololo	DECam	·	1.5 km	MPC · JPL
756097	2018 FW_{38}	—	March 27, 2018	Mount Lemmon	Mount Lemmon Survey	·	1.3 km	MPC · JPL
756098	2018 FJ_{39}	—	March 17, 2018	Haleakala	Pan-STARRS 1	·	1.0 km	MPC · JPL
756099	2018 FZ_{39}	—	March 18, 2018	Haleakala	Pan-STARRS 1	(5)	1.2 km	MPC · JPL
756100	2018 FA_{40}	—	March 17, 2018	Haleakala	Pan-STARRS 1	GAL	1.3 km	MPC · JPL

== 756101–756200 ==
back to top

Designation			Discovery			Properties		Ref
Permanent	Provisional	Named after	Date	Site	Discoverer(s)	Category	Diam.	Ref
756101	2018 FM_{40}	—	January 28, 2010	WISE	WISE	·	1.0 km	MPC · JPL
756102	2018 FQ_{44}	—	March 17, 2018	Haleakala	Pan-STARRS 1	·	1.7 km	MPC · JPL
756103	2018 FR_{45}	—	March 18, 2018	Haleakala	Pan-STARRS 1	·	1.2 km	MPC · JPL
756104	2018 FX_{53}	—	March 2, 2006	Kitt Peak	Spacewatch	L5	7.5 km	MPC · JPL
756105	2018 GR	—	August 2, 2011	Haleakala	Pan-STARRS 1	H	390 m	MPC · JPL
756106	2018 GU_{2}	—	September 16, 2009	Catalina	CSS	PHO	840 m	MPC · JPL
756107	2018 GM_{5}	—	August 15, 2009	Bergisch Gladbach	W. Bickel	·	640 m	MPC · JPL
756108	2018 GP_{10}	—	March 16, 2005	Catalina	CSS	·	1.5 km	MPC · JPL
756109	2018 GK_{11}	—	February 9, 2005	Kitt Peak	Spacewatch	·	1.2 km	MPC · JPL
756110	2018 GP_{12}	—	October 2, 2006	Mount Lemmon	Mount Lemmon Survey	·	520 m	MPC · JPL
756111	2018 GX_{12}	—	April 15, 2018	Mount Lemmon	Mount Lemmon Survey	·	2.1 km	MPC · JPL
756112	2018 GS_{16}	—	April 9, 2018	Cerro Paranal	Altmann, M., Prusti, T.	EUN	980 m	MPC · JPL
756113	2018 GX_{17}	—	April 10, 2018	Mount Lemmon	Mount Lemmon Survey	·	1.9 km	MPC · JPL
756114	2018 GC_{26}	—	April 12, 2018	Haleakala	Pan-STARRS 1	·	1.1 km	MPC · JPL
756115	2018 HY	—	January 14, 2015	Haleakala	Pan-STARRS 1	H	550 m	MPC · JPL
756116	2018 HB_{2}	—	April 23, 2018	Mount Lemmon	Mount Lemmon Survey	H	380 m	MPC · JPL
756117	2018 HF_{4}	—	November 17, 2012	Mount Lemmon	Mount Lemmon Survey	·	850 m	MPC · JPL
756118	2018 HC_{7}	—	April 16, 2018	Haleakala	Pan-STARRS 1	·	1.3 km	MPC · JPL
756119	2018 HR_{7}	—	April 5, 2014	Haleakala	Pan-STARRS 1	EUN	950 m	MPC · JPL
756120	2018 JR_{3}	—	March 14, 2007	Mount Lemmon	Mount Lemmon Survey	·	1.9 km	MPC · JPL
756121	2018 JA_{4}	—	September 9, 2015	Haleakala	Pan-STARRS 1	·	1.3 km	MPC · JPL
756122	2018 JF_{4}	—	December 29, 2008	Mount Lemmon	Mount Lemmon Survey	·	1.2 km	MPC · JPL
756123	2018 JG_{4}	—	December 1, 2014	Haleakala	Pan-STARRS 1	H	390 m	MPC · JPL
756124	2018 JZ_{4}	—	February 3, 2009	Mount Lemmon	Mount Lemmon Survey	·	1.3 km	MPC · JPL
756125	2018 JB_{5}	—	March 29, 2012	Haleakala	Pan-STARRS 1	·	2.2 km	MPC · JPL
756126	2018 KZ_{2}	—	August 28, 2006	Catalina	CSS	H	440 m	MPC · JPL
756127	2018 KH_{8}	—	May 18, 2018	Mount Lemmon	Mount Lemmon Survey	·	1.0 km	MPC · JPL
756128	2018 KO_{8}	—	May 19, 2018	Haleakala	Pan-STARRS 1	·	1.2 km	MPC · JPL
756129	2018 KE_{9}	—	November 3, 2015	Mount Lemmon	Mount Lemmon Survey	·	1.0 km	MPC · JPL
756130	2018 KE_{10}	—	May 23, 2014	Haleakala	Pan-STARRS 1	·	1.0 km	MPC · JPL
756131	2018 KJ_{10}	—	May 23, 2018	Haleakala	Pan-STARRS 1	·	1.4 km	MPC · JPL
756132	2018 LJ_{4}	—	May 13, 2018	Mount Lemmon	Mount Lemmon Survey	H	390 m	MPC · JPL
756133	2018 LK_{8}	—	January 18, 2008	Mount Lemmon	Mount Lemmon Survey	·	1.8 km	MPC · JPL
756134	2018 LY_{8}	—	September 28, 2014	Haleakala	Pan-STARRS 1	·	1.4 km	MPC · JPL
756135	2018 LN_{9}	—	July 25, 2014	Haleakala	Pan-STARRS 1	·	1.7 km	MPC · JPL
756136	2018 LU_{9}	—	January 28, 2004	Kitt Peak	Spacewatch	H	450 m	MPC · JPL
756137	2018 LC_{10}	—	April 5, 2014	Haleakala	Pan-STARRS 1	·	1.3 km	MPC · JPL
756138	2018 LH_{10}	—	October 25, 2015	Haleakala	Pan-STARRS 1	MAR	890 m	MPC · JPL
756139	2018 LE_{12}	—	March 30, 2016	Cerro Tololo	DECam	·	1.9 km	MPC · JPL
756140	2018 LO_{21}	—	June 13, 2018	Haleakala	Pan-STARRS 1	·	1.5 km	MPC · JPL
756141	2018 LH_{22}	—	June 15, 2018	Haleakala	Pan-STARRS 1	·	800 m	MPC · JPL
756142	2018 LY_{22}	—	June 8, 2018	Haleakala	Pan-STARRS 1	·	1.4 km	MPC · JPL
756143	2018 LD_{24}	—	June 10, 2018	Mount Lemmon	Mount Lemmon Survey	·	2.6 km	MPC · JPL
756144	2018 LW_{25}	—	June 13, 2018	Haleakala	Pan-STARRS 1	BRA	1.2 km	MPC · JPL
756145	2018 LN_{32}	—	May 19, 2014	Haleakala	Pan-STARRS 1	PHO	820 m	MPC · JPL
756146	2018 MO	—	March 12, 2008	Mount Lemmon	Mount Lemmon Survey	·	1.5 km	MPC · JPL
756147	2018 MD_{1}	—	April 10, 2013	Haleakala	Pan-STARRS 1	·	1.3 km	MPC · JPL
756148	2018 MA_{2}	—	May 3, 2005	Catalina	CSS	·	1.6 km	MPC · JPL
756149	2018 MB_{8}	—	July 5, 2014	Haleakala	Pan-STARRS 1	·	1.6 km	MPC · JPL
756150	2018 MU_{8}	—	March 28, 2016	Cerro Tololo	DECam	EOS	1.4 km	MPC · JPL
756151	2018 MJ_{9}	—	June 24, 2018	Haleakala	Pan-STARRS 1	·	2.2 km	MPC · JPL
756152	2018 MP_{9}	—	June 16, 2018	Haleakala	Pan-STARRS 1	·	3.0 km	MPC · JPL
756153	2018 NZ	—	September 4, 2016	Mount Lemmon	Mount Lemmon Survey	H	450 m	MPC · JPL
756154	2018 NH_{3}	—	January 20, 2009	Catalina	CSS	H	400 m	MPC · JPL
756155	2018 NP_{5}	—	September 12, 2015	Haleakala	Pan-STARRS 1	HNS	1 km	MPC · JPL
756156	2018 NH_{8}	—	August 31, 2005	Kitt Peak	Spacewatch	NEM	1.7 km	MPC · JPL
756157	2018 NE_{12}	—	September 23, 2014	Mount Lemmon	Mount Lemmon Survey	·	1.9 km	MPC · JPL
756158	2018 NJ_{12}	—	March 1, 2016	Mount Lemmon	Mount Lemmon Survey	·	2.4 km	MPC · JPL
756159	2018 NN_{12}	—	July 13, 2013	Haleakala	Pan-STARRS 1	H	440 m	MPC · JPL
756160	2018 NH_{13}	—	November 26, 2014	Haleakala	Pan-STARRS 1	EOS	1.3 km	MPC · JPL
756161	2018 NW_{15}	—	July 8, 2018	Haleakala	Pan-STARRS 1	·	2.6 km	MPC · JPL
756162	2018 NH_{23}	—	July 10, 2018	Haleakala	Pan-STARRS 1	L4	6.9 km	MPC · JPL
756163	2018 NH_{30}	—	August 22, 2014	Haleakala	Pan-STARRS 1	KON	1.8 km	MPC · JPL
756164	2018 ND_{58}	—	December 26, 2014	Haleakala	Pan-STARRS 1	·	2.7 km	MPC · JPL
756165	2018 OG_{1}	—	January 1, 2009	Kitt Peak	Spacewatch	V	520 m	MPC · JPL
756166	2018 PU	—	September 26, 2013	Catalina	CSS	·	2.4 km	MPC · JPL
756167	2018 PD_{3}	—	April 2, 2016	Mount Lemmon	Mount Lemmon Survey	·	2.4 km	MPC · JPL
756168	2018 PW_{5}	—	March 12, 2016	Haleakala	Pan-STARRS 1	·	2.2 km	MPC · JPL
756169	2018 PH_{7}	—	February 10, 2016	Haleakala	Pan-STARRS 1	EOS	1.3 km	MPC · JPL
756170	2018 PP_{10}	—	August 8, 2018	Haleakala	Pan-STARRS 1	APO	230 m	MPC · JPL
756171	2018 PL_{14}	—	November 21, 2014	Haleakala	Pan-STARRS 1	·	3.0 km	MPC · JPL
756172	2018 PK_{18}	—	June 16, 2018	Haleakala	Pan-STARRS 1	LIX	2.8 km	MPC · JPL
756173	2018 PC_{26}	—	June 22, 2012	Mount Lemmon	Mount Lemmon Survey	·	2.9 km	MPC · JPL
756174	2018 PJ_{26}	—	May 24, 2006	Mount Lemmon	Mount Lemmon Survey	·	3.5 km	MPC · JPL
756175	2018 PR_{27}	—	September 12, 2007	Kitt Peak	Spacewatch	·	2.8 km	MPC · JPL
756176	2018 PT_{27}	—	July 23, 2012	Mayhill-ISON	L. Elenin	THB	2.3 km	MPC · JPL
756177	2018 PP_{32}	—	August 13, 2018	Haleakala	Pan-STARRS 1	·	2.8 km	MPC · JPL
756178	2018 PX_{32}	—	August 11, 2018	Haleakala	Pan-STARRS 1	·	2.5 km	MPC · JPL
756179	2018 PR_{39}	—	December 25, 2013	Mount Lemmon	Mount Lemmon Survey	(1298)	2.7 km	MPC · JPL
756180	2018 PF_{44}	—	April 3, 2016	Haleakala	Pan-STARRS 1	·	2.3 km	MPC · JPL
756181	2018 PT_{55}	—	March 28, 2016	Cerro Tololo	DECam	·	2.1 km	MPC · JPL
756182	2018 PV_{55}	—	February 15, 2010	Mount Lemmon	Mount Lemmon Survey	·	2.1 km	MPC · JPL
756183	2018 QA_{6}	—	November 17, 2014	Mount Lemmon	Mount Lemmon Survey	·	3.1 km	MPC · JPL
756184	2018 QM_{9}	—	August 22, 2018	Haleakala	Pan-STARRS 1	EOS	1.5 km	MPC · JPL
756185	2018 QQ_{11}	—	March 12, 2016	Haleakala	Pan-STARRS 1	·	2.1 km	MPC · JPL
756186	2018 QU_{11}	—	August 22, 2018	Haleakala	Pan-STARRS 1	·	2.3 km	MPC · JPL
756187	2018 RL_{5}	—	August 30, 2013	Haleakala	Pan-STARRS 1	H	370 m	MPC · JPL
756188	2018 RC_{9}	—	January 21, 2015	Haleakala	Pan-STARRS 1	·	2.8 km	MPC · JPL
756189	2018 RG_{9}	—	November 15, 2010	Mount Lemmon	Mount Lemmon Survey	·	1.2 km	MPC · JPL
756190	2018 RH_{13}	—	January 14, 2016	Haleakala	Pan-STARRS 1	·	2.2 km	MPC · JPL
756191	2018 RY_{14}	—	August 13, 2012	Haleakala	Pan-STARRS 1	·	2.1 km	MPC · JPL
756192	2018 RW_{16}	—	September 10, 2007	Mount Lemmon	Mount Lemmon Survey	·	2.0 km	MPC · JPL
756193	2018 RP_{19}	—	May 21, 2012	Mount Lemmon	Mount Lemmon Survey	·	2.4 km	MPC · JPL
756194	2018 RU_{20}	—	August 31, 2014	Haleakala	Pan-STARRS 1	·	1.6 km	MPC · JPL
756195	2018 RC_{21}	—	June 21, 2018	Haleakala	Pan-STARRS 1	·	940 m	MPC · JPL
756196	2018 RP_{21}	—	January 16, 2015	Haleakala	Pan-STARRS 1	·	2.5 km	MPC · JPL
756197	2018 RE_{24}	—	August 21, 2012	Haleakala	Pan-STARRS 1	T_{j} (2.97)	2.7 km	MPC · JPL
756198	2018 RP_{27}	—	May 17, 2012	Mount Lemmon	Mount Lemmon Survey	·	1.7 km	MPC · JPL
756199	2018 RJ_{29}	—	October 16, 2013	Mount Lemmon	Mount Lemmon Survey	·	2.8 km	MPC · JPL
756200	2018 RC_{31}	—	December 13, 2014	Haleakala	Pan-STARRS 1	JUN	1.1 km	MPC · JPL

== 756201–756300 ==
back to top

Designation			Discovery			Properties		Ref
Permanent	Provisional	Named after	Date	Site	Discoverer(s)	Category	Diam.	Ref
756201	2018 RZ_{34}	—	August 19, 2018	Haleakala	Pan-STARRS 1	THB	2.4 km	MPC · JPL
756202	2018 RC_{35}	—	December 3, 2008	Mount Lemmon	Mount Lemmon Survey	EUP	3.0 km	MPC · JPL
756203	2018 RD_{35}	—	November 5, 2010	Mount Lemmon	Mount Lemmon Survey	H	440 m	MPC · JPL
756204	2018 RT_{35}	—	June 23, 2012	Mount Lemmon	Mount Lemmon Survey	·	2.8 km	MPC · JPL
756205	2018 RU_{35}	—	October 11, 2007	Catalina	CSS	·	2.2 km	MPC · JPL
756206	2018 RV_{35}	—	March 1, 2016	Haleakala	Pan-STARRS 1	BRA	1.5 km	MPC · JPL
756207	2018 RA_{37}	—	September 14, 2007	Mount Lemmon	Mount Lemmon Survey	·	2.8 km	MPC · JPL
756208	2018 RD_{38}	—	March 21, 2017	Haleakala	Pan-STARRS 1	·	1.2 km	MPC · JPL
756209	2018 RV_{38}	—	September 12, 2018	Mount Lemmon	Mount Lemmon Survey	·	2.3 km	MPC · JPL
756210	2018 RA_{39}	—	September 11, 2018	Mount Lemmon	Mount Lemmon Survey	·	3.3 km	MPC · JPL
756211	2018 RA_{44}	—	October 16, 2007	Mount Lemmon	Mount Lemmon Survey	·	2.0 km	MPC · JPL
756212	2018 RD_{44}	—	September 7, 2018	Mount Lemmon	Mount Lemmon Survey	EOS	1.7 km	MPC · JPL
756213	2018 RZ_{49}	—	September 11, 2018	Mount Lemmon	Mount Lemmon Survey	·	1.1 km	MPC · JPL
756214	2018 RZ_{53}	—	April 17, 2015	Cerro Tololo	DECam	EUP	1.9 km	MPC · JPL
756215	2018 RZ_{59}	—	September 13, 2018	Mount Lemmon	Mount Lemmon Survey	·	2.4 km	MPC · JPL
756216	2018 RY_{60}	—	September 14, 2018	Mount Lemmon	Mount Lemmon Survey	·	1.7 km	MPC · JPL
756217	2018 RQ_{61}	—	September 10, 2018	Mount Lemmon	Mount Lemmon Survey	·	1.2 km	MPC · JPL
756218	2018 RW_{66}	—	September 14, 2018	Mount Lemmon	Mount Lemmon Survey	EOS	1.5 km	MPC · JPL
756219	2018 SV_{1}	—	June 23, 2015	Haleakala	Pan-STARRS 1	H	410 m	MPC · JPL
756220	2018 SS_{5}	—	July 29, 2006	Siding Spring	SSS	(895)	3.5 km	MPC · JPL
756221	2018 SF_{6}	—	November 17, 2014	Haleakala	Pan-STARRS 1	·	1.6 km	MPC · JPL
756222	2018 SE_{7}	—	February 16, 2015	Haleakala	Pan-STARRS 1	·	2.0 km	MPC · JPL
756223	2018 SN_{11}	—	September 16, 2009	Kitt Peak	Spacewatch	·	2.1 km	MPC · JPL
756224	2018 ST_{11}	—	March 29, 2016	Cerro Tololo	DECam	THB	1.9 km	MPC · JPL
756225	2018 SB_{18}	—	September 16, 2018	Mount Lemmon	Mount Lemmon Survey	·	2.7 km	MPC · JPL
756226	2018 TX_{9}	—	September 13, 2007	Mount Lemmon	Mount Lemmon Survey	TIR	1.8 km	MPC · JPL
756227	2018 TL_{10}	—	September 11, 2007	Mount Lemmon	Mount Lemmon Survey	·	1.1 km	MPC · JPL
756228	2018 TB_{11}	—	October 12, 2007	Kitt Peak	Spacewatch	·	1.9 km	MPC · JPL
756229	2018 TY_{25}	—	October 5, 2018	Mount Lemmon	Mount Lemmon Survey	·	2.0 km	MPC · JPL
756230	2018 TZ_{25}	—	October 3, 2018	Haleakala	Pan-STARRS 2	EOS	1.4 km	MPC · JPL
756231	2018 TC_{31}	—	October 4, 2018	Haleakala	Pan-STARRS 2	TIR	2.3 km	MPC · JPL
756232	2018 TF_{36}	—	September 14, 2013	Haleakala	Pan-STARRS 1	TRE	2.3 km	MPC · JPL
756233	2018 TV_{37}	—	March 28, 2016	Cerro Tololo	DECam	·	2.5 km	MPC · JPL
756234	2018 US	—	October 1, 2005	Catalina	CSS	·	540 m	MPC · JPL
756235	2018 UB_{2}	—	November 10, 2005	Catalina	CSS	H	640 m	MPC · JPL
756236	2018 UZ_{3}	—	November 27, 2013	Haleakala	Pan-STARRS 1	EUP	3.5 km	MPC · JPL
756237	2018 US_{6}	—	July 31, 2014	Haleakala	Pan-STARRS 1	·	1.1 km	MPC · JPL
756238	2018 UB_{7}	—	February 17, 2015	Haleakala	Pan-STARRS 1	HYG	2.1 km	MPC · JPL
756239	2018 UM_{8}	—	October 3, 2014	Mount Lemmon	Mount Lemmon Survey	·	1 km	MPC · JPL
756240	2018 UK_{13}	—	November 9, 1999	Socorro	LINEAR	·	1.0 km	MPC · JPL
756241	2018 UR_{14}	—	December 2, 2010	Catalina	CSS	·	1.0 km	MPC · JPL
756242	2018 UK_{18}	—	December 13, 2007	Socorro	LINEAR	·	2.2 km	MPC · JPL
756243	2018 UG_{20}	—	October 17, 2018	Haleakala	Pan-STARRS 2	·	2.7 km	MPC · JPL
756244	2018 UO_{21}	—	September 15, 2006	Kitt Peak	Spacewatch	·	2.4 km	MPC · JPL
756245	2018 UZ_{22}	—	August 6, 2012	Haleakala	Pan-STARRS 1	EOS	1.6 km	MPC · JPL
756246	2018 UK_{26}	—	October 10, 2018	Mount Lemmon	Mount Lemmon Survey	·	1.8 km	MPC · JPL
756247	2018 UN_{26}	—	October 10, 2018	Mount Lemmon	Mount Lemmon Survey	·	2.3 km	MPC · JPL
756248	2018 VV_{1}	—	October 18, 2018	Mount Lemmon	Mount Lemmon Survey	AMO	360 m	MPC · JPL
756249	2018 VG_{2}	—	February 27, 2012	Haleakala	Pan-STARRS 1	H	450 m	MPC · JPL
756250	2018 VO_{2}	—	March 18, 2017	Haleakala	Pan-STARRS 1	H	510 m	MPC · JPL
756251	2018 VW_{2}	—	March 18, 2017	Haleakala	Pan-STARRS 1	H	470 m	MPC · JPL
756252	2018 VZ_{12}	—	February 16, 2010	Mount Lemmon	Mount Lemmon Survey	·	2.3 km	MPC · JPL
756253	2018 VK_{16}	—	November 19, 2007	Mount Lemmon	Mount Lemmon Survey	LIX	3.1 km	MPC · JPL
756254	2018 VP_{18}	—	March 2, 2009	Mount Lemmon	Mount Lemmon Survey	T_{j} (2.99) · EUP	2.9 km	MPC · JPL
756255	2018 VU_{27}	—	May 10, 2007	Mount Lemmon	Mount Lemmon Survey	H	420 m	MPC · JPL
756256	2018 VP_{28}	—	November 17, 2014	Haleakala	Pan-STARRS 1	·	1.3 km	MPC · JPL
756257	2018 VB_{29}	—	September 11, 2007	Mount Lemmon	Mount Lemmon Survey	·	3.8 km	MPC · JPL
756258	2018 VL_{29}	—	December 3, 2008	Mount Lemmon	Mount Lemmon Survey	·	3.1 km	MPC · JPL
756259	2018 VL_{30}	—	May 29, 2012	Mount Lemmon	Mount Lemmon Survey	·	3.2 km	MPC · JPL
756260	2018 VN_{30}	—	January 20, 2015	Haleakala	Pan-STARRS 1	·	2.7 km	MPC · JPL
756261	2018 VF_{35}	—	November 22, 2014	Haleakala	Pan-STARRS 1	·	1.0 km	MPC · JPL
756262	2018 VO_{41}	—	April 19, 2015	Cerro Tololo	DECam	·	2.7 km	MPC · JPL
756263	2018 VV_{41}	—	September 15, 2007	Mount Lemmon	Mount Lemmon Survey	·	1.7 km	MPC · JPL
756264	2018 VB_{45}	—	February 9, 2016	Haleakala	Pan-STARRS 1	·	2.2 km	MPC · JPL
756265	2018 VH_{47}	—	October 5, 2012	Mount Lemmon	Mount Lemmon Survey	·	2.5 km	MPC · JPL
756266	2018 VX_{48}	—	March 4, 2013	Haleakala	Pan-STARRS 1	·	570 m	MPC · JPL
756267	2018 VL_{49}	—	October 2, 2013	Haleakala	Pan-STARRS 1	·	1.4 km	MPC · JPL
756268	2018 VV_{51}	—	April 18, 2009	Kitt Peak	Spacewatch	(69559)	2.6 km	MPC · JPL
756269	2018 VS_{52}	—	October 23, 2007	Kitt Peak	Spacewatch	·	2.7 km	MPC · JPL
756270	2018 VY_{55}	—	November 17, 2007	Mount Lemmon	Mount Lemmon Survey	·	2.3 km	MPC · JPL
756271	2018 VZ_{55}	—	April 16, 2013	Haleakala	Pan-STARRS 1	·	1.5 km	MPC · JPL
756272	2018 VJ_{60}	—	December 8, 2010	Kitt Peak	Spacewatch	(5)	1.1 km	MPC · JPL
756273	2018 VC_{70}	—	October 16, 2012	Mount Lemmon	Mount Lemmon Survey	·	2.5 km	MPC · JPL
756274	2018 VM_{73}	—	June 2, 2014	Haleakala	Pan-STARRS 1	·	580 m	MPC · JPL
756275	2018 VY_{77}	—	April 1, 2017	Haleakala	Pan-STARRS 1	·	1.5 km	MPC · JPL
756276	2018 VG_{78}	—	September 22, 2009	Mount Lemmon	Mount Lemmon Survey	·	1.9 km	MPC · JPL
756277	2018 VK_{82}	—	May 29, 2012	Mount Lemmon	Mount Lemmon Survey	·	1.8 km	MPC · JPL
756278	2018 VY_{82}	—	January 21, 2012	Catalina	CSS	·	960 m	MPC · JPL
756279	2018 VB_{84}	—	January 7, 2005	Kitt Peak	Spacewatch	·	900 m	MPC · JPL
756280	2018 VE_{84}	—	December 19, 2003	Kitt Peak	Spacewatch	·	930 m	MPC · JPL
756281	2018 VJ_{84}	—	August 14, 2012	Haleakala	Pan-STARRS 1	·	2.3 km	MPC · JPL
756282	2018 VN_{84}	—	September 8, 2012	Bergisch Gladbach	W. Bickel	·	2.6 km	MPC · JPL
756283	2018 VE_{88}	—	August 29, 2006	Kitt Peak	Spacewatch	·	2.6 km	MPC · JPL
756284	2018 VD_{90}	—	October 10, 2012	Mount Lemmon	Mount Lemmon Survey	·	2.5 km	MPC · JPL
756285	2018 VU_{91}	—	March 20, 2015	Haleakala	Pan-STARRS 1	·	2.2 km	MPC · JPL
756286	2018 VH_{93}	—	April 18, 2015	Cerro Tololo	DECam	·	2.4 km	MPC · JPL
756287	2018 VM_{93}	—	September 23, 2011	Haleakala	Pan-STARRS 1	ULA	3.4 km	MPC · JPL
756288	2018 VJ_{94}	—	November 24, 2009	Kitt Peak	Spacewatch	·	1.4 km	MPC · JPL
756289	2018 VE_{101}	—	November 26, 2003	Kitt Peak	Spacewatch	·	880 m	MPC · JPL
756290	2018 VR_{102}	—	September 21, 2012	Kitt Peak	Spacewatch	·	2.9 km	MPC · JPL
756291	2018 VN_{108}	—	November 3, 2007	Kitt Peak	Spacewatch	·	2.5 km	MPC · JPL
756292	2018 VS_{109}	—	December 8, 2015	Haleakala	Pan-STARRS 1	·	1.4 km	MPC · JPL
756293	2018 VD_{110}	—	October 6, 2012	Haleakala	Pan-STARRS 1	T_{j} (2.91)	4.2 km	MPC · JPL
756294	2018 VK_{111}	—	October 9, 2013	Mount Lemmon	Mount Lemmon Survey	·	1.6 km	MPC · JPL
756295	2018 VZ_{114}	—	April 30, 2016	Haleakala	Pan-STARRS 1	EOS	1.7 km	MPC · JPL
756296	2018 VM_{118}	—	November 7, 2018	Mount Lemmon	Mount Lemmon Survey	H	470 m	MPC · JPL
756297	2018 VV_{122}	—	October 9, 2012	Mount Lemmon	Mount Lemmon Survey	(43176)	2.3 km	MPC · JPL
756298	2018 VX_{122}	—	October 10, 2018	Mount Lemmon	Mount Lemmon Survey	·	1.9 km	MPC · JPL
756299	2018 VZ_{122}	—	November 2, 2018	Mount Lemmon	Mount Lemmon Survey	·	1.8 km	MPC · JPL
756300	2018 VF_{123}	—	November 8, 2018	Mount Lemmon	Mount Lemmon Survey	·	2.6 km	MPC · JPL

== 756301–756400 ==
back to top

Designation			Discovery			Properties		Ref
Permanent	Provisional	Named after	Date	Site	Discoverer(s)	Category	Diam.	Ref
756301	2018 VA_{124}	—	November 9, 2018	Mount Lemmon	Mount Lemmon Survey	EOS	1.4 km	MPC · JPL
756302	2018 VJ_{125}	—	November 7, 2018	Mount Teide	ESA OGS	EOS	1.5 km	MPC · JPL
756303	2018 VR_{125}	—	May 11, 2015	Mount Lemmon	Mount Lemmon Survey	LIX	3.1 km	MPC · JPL
756304	2018 VJ_{128}	—	November 1, 2018	Mount Lemmon	Mount Lemmon Survey	·	1.2 km	MPC · JPL
756305	2018 VD_{132}	—	November 2, 2018	Mount Lemmon	Mount Lemmon Survey	·	2.8 km	MPC · JPL
756306	2018 VG_{139}	—	November 1, 2018	Haleakala	Pan-STARRS 2	·	1.3 km	MPC · JPL
756307	2018 VJ_{139}	—	September 20, 2014	Haleakala	Pan-STARRS 1	·	810 m	MPC · JPL
756308	2018 VG_{141}	—	July 26, 2017	Haleakala	Pan-STARRS 1	·	1.7 km	MPC · JPL
756309	2018 VR_{142}	—	November 2, 2018	Mount Lemmon	Mount Lemmon Survey	·	1.3 km	MPC · JPL
756310	2018 VR_{145}	—	April 2, 2016	Haleakala	Pan-STARRS 1	·	1.2 km	MPC · JPL
756311	2018 VX_{153}	—	November 7, 2018	Mount Lemmon	Mount Lemmon Survey	·	1.6 km	MPC · JPL
756312	2018 VY_{153}	—	January 27, 2015	Haleakala	Pan-STARRS 1	·	2.2 km	MPC · JPL
756313	2018 WO_{5}	—	October 8, 2012	Haleakala	Pan-STARRS 1	·	2.4 km	MPC · JPL
756314	2018 XQ_{1}	—	January 29, 1995	Kitt Peak	Spacewatch	H	380 m	MPC · JPL
756315	2018 XB_{3}	—	August 10, 2012	Kitt Peak	Spacewatch	H	580 m	MPC · JPL
756316	2018 XV_{5}	—	September 10, 2018	Mount Lemmon	Mount Lemmon Survey	APO +1km · PHA	1.0 km	MPC · JPL
756317	2018 XT_{7}	—	September 8, 2018	Mount Lemmon	Mount Lemmon Survey	·	2.8 km	MPC · JPL
756318	2018 XG_{13}	—	February 9, 2014	Mount Lemmon	Mount Lemmon Survey	·	2.2 km	MPC · JPL
756319	2018 XJ_{16}	—	September 9, 2018	Mount Lemmon	Mount Lemmon Survey	·	1.2 km	MPC · JPL
756320	2018 XX_{23}	—	December 14, 2018	Haleakala	Pan-STARRS 1	EOS	1.6 km	MPC · JPL
756321	2018 XE_{31}	—	December 4, 2018	Tenerife	ESA OGS	EOS	1.5 km	MPC · JPL
756322	2018 YJ_{1}	—	November 4, 2012	Kitt Peak	Spacewatch	LUT	4.3 km	MPC · JPL
756323	2018 YU_{4}	—	February 20, 2014	Haleakala	Pan-STARRS 1	·	1.6 km	MPC · JPL
756324	2018 YL_{6}	—	April 2, 2014	Mount Lemmon	Mount Lemmon Survey	·	2.4 km	MPC · JPL
756325	2019 AW_{1}	—	August 25, 2012	Haleakala	Pan-STARRS 1	H	450 m	MPC · JPL
756326	2019 AA_{4}	—	September 16, 2009	Mount Lemmon	Mount Lemmon Survey	H	380 m	MPC · JPL
756327	2019 AN_{5}	—	January 3, 2019	Haleakala	Pan-STARRS 1	APO · PHA	220 m	MPC · JPL
756328	2019 AJ_{20}	—	October 19, 2012	Mount Lemmon	Mount Lemmon Survey	·	2.8 km	MPC · JPL
756329	2019 AK_{20}	—	October 21, 2012	Mount Lemmon	Mount Lemmon Survey	·	3.1 km	MPC · JPL
756330	2019 AJ_{21}	—	October 22, 2012	Haleakala	Pan-STARRS 1	EOS	1.2 km	MPC · JPL
756331	2019 AF_{23}	—	July 26, 2015	Haleakala	Pan-STARRS 1	·	2.7 km	MPC · JPL
756332	2019 AO_{25}	—	March 4, 2016	Haleakala	Pan-STARRS 1	·	1.1 km	MPC · JPL
756333	2019 AF_{26}	—	February 26, 2009	Catalina	CSS	PHO	850 m	MPC · JPL
756334	2019 AF_{28}	—	October 24, 2014	Mount Lemmon	Mount Lemmon Survey	·	1.3 km	MPC · JPL
756335	2019 AC_{33}	—	April 18, 2015	Cerro Tololo	DECam	·	2.6 km	MPC · JPL
756336	2019 AX_{33}	—	February 26, 2014	Haleakala	Pan-STARRS 1	·	3.5 km	MPC · JPL
756337	2019 AH_{36}	—	October 3, 2013	Kitt Peak	Spacewatch	·	1.4 km	MPC · JPL
756338	2019 AV_{39}	—	January 13, 2019	Haleakala	Pan-STARRS 1	·	2.7 km	MPC · JPL
756339	2019 AD_{42}	—	May 29, 2015	Haleakala	Pan-STARRS 1	·	1.3 km	MPC · JPL
756340	2019 AV_{54}	—	January 14, 2019	Haleakala	Pan-STARRS 1	·	950 m	MPC · JPL
756341	2019 AB_{56}	—	January 14, 2019	Haleakala	Pan-STARRS 1	·	1.8 km	MPC · JPL
756342	2019 AC_{56}	—	January 13, 2019	Haleakala	Pan-STARRS 1	·	1.1 km	MPC · JPL
756343	2019 AF_{60}	—	January 7, 2019	Haleakala	Pan-STARRS 1	T_{j} (2.99) · EUP	2.8 km	MPC · JPL
756344	2019 AM_{64}	—	April 1, 2016	Haleakala	Pan-STARRS 1	·	960 m	MPC · JPL
756345	2019 AP_{64}	—	January 10, 2019	Haleakala	Pan-STARRS 1	·	990 m	MPC · JPL
756346	2019 AH_{84}	—	January 12, 2019	Haleakala	Pan-STARRS 1	L5	8.6 km	MPC · JPL
756347	2019 AC_{115}	—	January 3, 2019	Haleakala	Pan-STARRS 1	·	1.3 km	MPC · JPL
756348	2019 BV_{5}	—	January 8, 2016	Haleakala	Pan-STARRS 1	·	640 m	MPC · JPL
756349	2019 BJ_{6}	—	October 18, 2017	Haleakala	Pan-STARRS 1	EOS	1.6 km	MPC · JPL
756350	2019 BD_{8}	—	October 24, 2009	Kitt Peak	Spacewatch	3:2 · SHU	4.2 km	MPC · JPL
756351	2019 BY_{9}	—	January 17, 2019	Haleakala	Pan-STARRS 1	H	390 m	MPC · JPL
756352	2019 CU_{5}	—	April 21, 1998	Socorro	LINEAR	BAR	1.0 km	MPC · JPL
756353	2019 CD_{6}	—	September 5, 2010	Mount Lemmon	Mount Lemmon Survey	PHO	920 m	MPC · JPL
756354	2019 CM_{6}	—	September 5, 2017	Haleakala	Pan-STARRS 1	HNS	1.2 km	MPC · JPL
756355	2019 CR_{6}	—	December 16, 2012	Kislovodsk	V. Nevski, E. Romas	·	2.8 km	MPC · JPL
756356	2019 CY_{6}	—	October 11, 2010	Mount Lemmon	Mount Lemmon Survey	·	1.1 km	MPC · JPL
756357	2019 CK_{10}	—	February 1, 2009	Mount Lemmon	Mount Lemmon Survey	·	530 m	MPC · JPL
756358	2019 CM_{10}	—	January 28, 2014	Mount Lemmon	Mount Lemmon Survey	·	2.4 km	MPC · JPL
756359	2019 CQ_{13}	—	February 5, 2019	Haleakala	Pan-STARRS 1	·	1.4 km	MPC · JPL
756360	2019 CZ_{16}	—	February 8, 2019	Palomar	Zwicky Transient Facility	·	2.5 km	MPC · JPL
756361	2019 FW_{9}	—	March 29, 2019	Mount Lemmon	Mount Lemmon Survey	·	1.5 km	MPC · JPL
756362	2019 FX_{16}	—	March 29, 2019	Mount Lemmon	Mount Lemmon Survey	L5	8.8 km	MPC · JPL
756363	2019 FA_{17}	—	March 29, 2019	Mount Lemmon	Mount Lemmon Survey	L5	7.6 km	MPC · JPL
756364	2019 FT_{17}	—	April 23, 2015	Haleakala	Pan-STARRS 2	·	740 m	MPC · JPL
756365	2019 GR_{3}	—	July 19, 2009	Siding Spring	SSS	·	1.1 km	MPC · JPL
756366	2019 GQ_{4}	—	January 1, 2009	XuYi	PMO NEO Survey Program	·	510 m	MPC · JPL
756367	2019 GK_{6}	—	January 13, 2016	Mount Lemmon	Mount Lemmon Survey	L5	8.3 km	MPC · JPL
756368	2019 GK_{9}	—	March 28, 2015	Haleakala	Pan-STARRS 1	·	1.1 km	MPC · JPL
756369	2019 GN_{15}	—	October 16, 2007	Kitt Peak	Spacewatch	·	540 m	MPC · JPL
756370	2019 GB_{21}	—	February 8, 2019	Haleakala	Pan-STARRS 1	·	1.3 km	MPC · JPL
756371	2019 GH_{22}	—	August 10, 2007	Kitt Peak	Spacewatch	·	1.1 km	MPC · JPL
756372	2019 GF_{24}	—	April 3, 2019	Haleakala	Pan-STARRS 1	·	1.1 km	MPC · JPL
756373	2019 GQ_{24}	—	May 3, 2006	Kitt Peak	Spacewatch	·	1.2 km	MPC · JPL
756374	2019 GV_{24}	—	April 6, 2019	Haleakala	Pan-STARRS 1	·	1.1 km	MPC · JPL
756375	2019 GX_{24}	—	April 3, 2019	Haleakala	Pan-STARRS 1	·	1.1 km	MPC · JPL
756376	2019 GJ_{26}	—	April 6, 2019	Haleakala	Pan-STARRS 1	BAR	760 m	MPC · JPL
756377	2019 GC_{39}	—	April 12, 2011	Mount Lemmon	Mount Lemmon Survey	·	880 m	MPC · JPL
756378	2019 GO_{39}	—	April 6, 2019	Haleakala	Pan-STARRS 1	BRG	1.2 km	MPC · JPL
756379	2019 GK_{43}	—	September 10, 2007	Kitt Peak	Spacewatch	·	1.2 km	MPC · JPL
756380	2019 GS_{50}	—	April 5, 2019	Haleakala	Pan-STARRS 1	L5	6.9 km	MPC · JPL
756381	2019 GO_{51}	—	April 2, 2019	Haleakala	Pan-STARRS 1	·	600 m	MPC · JPL
756382	2019 GD_{52}	—	April 3, 2019	Haleakala	Pan-STARRS 1	·	570 m	MPC · JPL
756383	2019 GH_{52}	—	April 2, 2019	Haleakala	Pan-STARRS 1	L5	7.1 km	MPC · JPL
756384	2019 GK_{52}	—	April 5, 2019	Haleakala	Pan-STARRS 1	·	770 m	MPC · JPL
756385	2019 GL_{52}	—	April 7, 2019	Haleakala	Pan-STARRS 1	·	1.1 km	MPC · JPL
756386	2019 GH_{54}	—	April 5, 2019	Haleakala	Pan-STARRS 1	·	1.1 km	MPC · JPL
756387	2019 GK_{54}	—	April 5, 2019	Haleakala	Pan-STARRS 1	·	1.2 km	MPC · JPL
756388	2019 GO_{54}	—	April 18, 2015	Cerro Tololo	DECam	·	820 m	MPC · JPL
756389	2019 GF_{55}	—	April 2, 2019	Haleakala	Pan-STARRS 1	L5	7.7 km	MPC · JPL
756390	2019 GY_{55}	—	May 20, 2015	Cerro Tololo	DECam	·	1.1 km	MPC · JPL
756391	2019 GO_{56}	—	April 4, 2019	Haleakala	Pan-STARRS 1	JUN	900 m	MPC · JPL
756392	2019 GF_{62}	—	June 25, 2015	Haleakala	Pan-STARRS 1	·	1.4 km	MPC · JPL
756393	2019 GA_{65}	—	May 21, 2015	Haleakala	Pan-STARRS 1	·	1.1 km	MPC · JPL
756394	2019 GR_{65}	—	April 4, 2019	Haleakala	Pan-STARRS 1	(5)	940 m	MPC · JPL
756395	2019 GD_{70}	—	April 3, 2019	Haleakala	Pan-STARRS 1	·	1.2 km	MPC · JPL
756396	2019 GU_{70}	—	April 8, 2019	Haleakala	Pan-STARRS 1	·	1.1 km	MPC · JPL
756397	2019 GD_{74}	—	April 8, 2019	Haleakala	Pan-STARRS 1	·	640 m	MPC · JPL
756398	2019 GY_{74}	—	April 5, 2019	Haleakala	Pan-STARRS 1	L5	7.8 km	MPC · JPL
756399	2019 GL_{75}	—	April 3, 2019	Haleakala	Pan-STARRS 1	·	920 m	MPC · JPL
756400	2019 GH_{80}	—	April 7, 2019	Haleakala	Pan-STARRS 1	PHO	710 m	MPC · JPL

== 756401–756500 ==
back to top

Designation			Discovery			Properties		Ref
Permanent	Provisional	Named after	Date	Site	Discoverer(s)	Category	Diam.	Ref
756401	2019 GH_{81}	—	April 2, 2019	Haleakala	Pan-STARRS 1	L5	6.4 km	MPC · JPL
756402	2019 GU_{84}	—	April 3, 2019	Haleakala	Pan-STARRS 1	·	1.2 km	MPC · JPL
756403	2019 GL_{98}	—	April 3, 2019	Haleakala	Pan-STARRS 1	L5	6.5 km	MPC · JPL
756404	2019 GF_{118}	—	April 8, 2019	Haleakala	Pan-STARRS 1	L5	7.0 km	MPC · JPL
756405	2019 GF_{151}	—	April 5, 2019	Haleakala	Pan-STARRS 1	L5	6.5 km	MPC · JPL
756406	2019 GP_{172}	—	November 17, 2014	Haleakala	Pan-STARRS 1	L5	7.1 km	MPC · JPL
756407	2019 HA_{1}	—	February 3, 2012	Oukaïmeden	C. Rinner	PHO	810 m	MPC · JPL
756408	2019 HT_{1}	—	May 23, 2006	Mount Lemmon	Mount Lemmon Survey	·	530 m	MPC · JPL
756409	2019 HZ_{1}	—	July 19, 2006	Mauna Kea	P. A. Wiegert, D. Subasinghe	·	600 m	MPC · JPL
756410	2019 HP_{4}	—	April 2, 2006	Kitt Peak	Spacewatch	·	1.3 km	MPC · JPL
756411	2019 HK_{5}	—	April 26, 2019	Mount Lemmon	Mount Lemmon Survey	·	1.2 km	MPC · JPL
756412	2019 HS_{5}	—	October 21, 2007	Kitt Peak	Spacewatch	·	1.1 km	MPC · JPL
756413	2019 HR_{8}	—	April 15, 2015	Kitt Peak	M. W. Buie, L. H. Wasserman	EUN	900 m	MPC · JPL
756414	2019 JC_{4}	—	October 10, 2010	Mount Lemmon	Mount Lemmon Survey	·	640 m	MPC · JPL
756415	2019 JW_{11}	—	May 13, 2007	Mount Lemmon	Mount Lemmon Survey	·	800 m	MPC · JPL
756416	2019 JV_{12}	—	May 2, 2019	Mount Lemmon	Mount Lemmon Survey	·	1.2 km	MPC · JPL
756417	2019 JQ_{17}	—	October 13, 2016	Haleakala	Pan-STARRS 1	·	1.1 km	MPC · JPL
756418	2019 JN_{36}	—	January 10, 2007	Mount Lemmon	Mount Lemmon Survey	·	910 m	MPC · JPL
756419	2019 JR_{37}	—	November 12, 2010	Mount Lemmon	Mount Lemmon Survey	·	2.4 km	MPC · JPL
756420	2019 JU_{41}	—	June 24, 2011	Kitt Peak	Spacewatch	·	890 m	MPC · JPL
756421	2019 JS_{43}	—	May 27, 2006	Kitt Peak	Spacewatch	EUN	930 m	MPC · JPL
756422	2019 JL_{47}	—	October 11, 2015	Mount Lemmon	Mount Lemmon Survey	·	2.0 km	MPC · JPL
756423	2019 JU_{47}	—	May 2, 2019	Haleakala	Pan-STARRS 1	·	1.1 km	MPC · JPL
756424	2019 JG_{48}	—	April 6, 2019	Haleakala	Pan-STARRS 1	·	970 m	MPC · JPL
756425	2019 JV_{48}	—	May 1, 2019	Haleakala	Pan-STARRS 1	·	840 m	MPC · JPL
756426	2019 JM_{53}	—	May 1, 2019	Haleakala	Pan-STARRS 1	·	890 m	MPC · JPL
756427	2019 JC_{54}	—	May 26, 2015	Haleakala	Pan-STARRS 1	·	1.1 km	MPC · JPL
756428	2019 JY_{55}	—	October 2, 2003	Kitt Peak	Spacewatch	·	1.3 km	MPC · JPL
756429	2019 JS_{61}	—	May 2, 2019	Haleakala	Pan-STARRS 1	·	1.2 km	MPC · JPL
756430	2019 JR_{64}	—	May 1, 2019	Haleakala	Pan-STARRS 1	(194)	1.0 km	MPC · JPL
756431	2019 JX_{64}	—	May 5, 2019	Cerro Tololo	DECam	·	1.2 km	MPC · JPL
756432	2019 JH_{65}	—	May 1, 2019	Haleakala	Pan-STARRS 1	EUN	790 m	MPC · JPL
756433	2019 JF_{71}	—	August 31, 2009	Siding Spring	SSS	·	2.2 km	MPC · JPL
756434	2019 JT_{72}	—	July 28, 2011	Haleakala	Pan-STARRS 1	·	1.1 km	MPC · JPL
756435	2019 JY_{75}	—	May 9, 2019	Haleakala	Pan-STARRS 1	·	1.0 km	MPC · JPL
756436	2019 JN_{80}	—	May 26, 2015	Haleakala	Pan-STARRS 1	(5)	820 m	MPC · JPL
756437	2019 JT_{83}	—	June 11, 2015	Haleakala	Pan-STARRS 1	·	910 m	MPC · JPL
756438	2019 KZ_{6}	—	December 12, 2014	Haleakala	Pan-STARRS 1	L5	8.0 km	MPC · JPL
756439	2019 KT_{7}	—	May 30, 2019	Haleakala	Pan-STARRS 1	BRA	1.1 km	MPC · JPL
756440	2019 KF_{11}	—	May 27, 2019	Haleakala	Pan-STARRS 1	·	970 m	MPC · JPL
756441	2019 KA_{14}	—	June 16, 1998	Kitt Peak	Spacewatch	·	1.1 km	MPC · JPL
756442	2019 KB_{16}	—	May 27, 2019	Haleakala	Pan-STARRS 1	·	690 m	MPC · JPL
756443	2019 KU_{16}	—	November 5, 2016	Mount Lemmon	Mount Lemmon Survey	·	940 m	MPC · JPL
756444	2019 KJ_{20}	—	May 28, 2019	Mount Lemmon	Mount Lemmon Survey	EUN	950 m	MPC · JPL
756445	2019 KN_{20}	—	May 27, 2019	Haleakala	Pan-STARRS 2	·	900 m	MPC · JPL
756446	2019 KK_{21}	—	May 26, 2019	Haleakala	Pan-STARRS 1	EUN	780 m	MPC · JPL
756447	2019 KM_{22}	—	October 19, 2007	Mount Lemmon	Mount Lemmon Survey	·	1.1 km	MPC · JPL
756448	2019 KZ_{22}	—	May 30, 2019	Haleakala	Pan-STARRS 1	·	1.4 km	MPC · JPL
756449	2019 KU_{24}	—	May 25, 2015	Haleakala	Pan-STARRS 1	·	1.1 km	MPC · JPL
756450	2019 KP_{26}	—	May 25, 2019	Haleakala	Pan-STARRS 1	·	1.4 km	MPC · JPL
756451	2019 KF_{31}	—	September 25, 2008	Kitt Peak	Spacewatch	·	1.2 km	MPC · JPL
756452	2019 KJ_{32}	—	May 31, 2019	Haleakala	Pan-STARRS 1	(5)	960 m	MPC · JPL
756453	2019 KE_{41}	—	May 29, 2019	Haleakala	Pan-STARRS 1	·	1.3 km	MPC · JPL
756454	2019 KH_{45}	—	October 17, 2010	Mount Lemmon	Mount Lemmon Survey	·	1.9 km	MPC · JPL
756455	2019 KE_{63}	—	May 27, 2019	Haleakala	Pan-STARRS 1	·	2.6 km	MPC · JPL
756456	2019 LB_{3}	—	December 23, 2012	Haleakala	Pan-STARRS 1	H	440 m	MPC · JPL
756457	2019 LC_{10}	—	September 8, 2015	Haleakala	Pan-STARRS 1	·	1.8 km	MPC · JPL
756458	2019 LE_{13}	—	June 11, 2019	Palomar	Zwicky Transient Facility	·	2.2 km	MPC · JPL
756459	2019 LX_{14}	—	June 1, 2019	Haleakala	Pan-STARRS 2	·	1.1 km	MPC · JPL
756460	2019 LE_{15}	—	June 11, 2019	Haleakala	Pan-STARRS 1	·	1.0 km	MPC · JPL
756461	2019 LD_{16}	—	June 3, 2019	Haleakala	Pan-STARRS 1	·	1.1 km	MPC · JPL
756462	2019 MB	—	December 19, 2003	Socorro	LINEAR	T_{j} (2.97)	5.5 km	MPC · JPL
756463	2019 MM_{3}	—	January 20, 2017	Haleakala	Pan-STARRS 1	BAR	960 m	MPC · JPL
756464	2019 MD_{7}	—	July 8, 2015	Mount Lemmon	Mount Lemmon Survey	·	1.4 km	MPC · JPL
756465	2019 MQ_{11}	—	June 28, 2019	Haleakala	Pan-STARRS 1	·	1.6 km	MPC · JPL
756466	2019 MS_{12}	—	June 25, 2019	Haleakala	Pan-STARRS 1	·	950 m	MPC · JPL
756467	2019 MD_{13}	—	June 24, 2019	Palomar	Zwicky Transient Facility	·	970 m	MPC · JPL
756468	2019 MJ_{13}	—	November 23, 2015	Mount Lemmon	Mount Lemmon Survey	BAR	950 m	MPC · JPL
756469	2019 ML_{14}	—	March 23, 2015	Haleakala	Pan-STARRS 1	·	940 m	MPC · JPL
756470	2019 MM_{15}	—	January 17, 2018	Haleakala	Pan-STARRS 1	·	1.5 km	MPC · JPL
756471	2019 MB_{17}	—	June 27, 2019	Palomar	Zwicky Transient Facility	·	1.3 km	MPC · JPL
756472	2019 MC_{18}	—	June 24, 2019	Palomar	Zwicky Transient Facility	·	1.0 km	MPC · JPL
756473	2019 MY_{21}	—	June 22, 2019	Haleakala	Pan-STARRS 1	·	1.3 km	MPC · JPL
756474	2019 MU_{24}	—	April 18, 2015	Cerro Tololo	DECam	L4	6.6 km	MPC · JPL
756475	2019 NK	—	April 3, 2019	Mount Lemmon	Mount Lemmon Survey	L5	7.4 km	MPC · JPL
756476	2019 NC_{1}	—	July 1, 2019	Observatorio Campo	Amaral, L. S.	ATE	190 m	MPC · JPL
756477	2019 NH_{3}	—	July 4, 2019	Mount Lemmon	Mount Lemmon Survey	·	1.2 km	MPC · JPL
756478	2019 NK_{3}	—	April 29, 2015	Mount Lemmon	Mount Lemmon Survey	·	1.2 km	MPC · JPL
756479	2019 NV_{3}	—	April 20, 2015	Haleakala	Pan-STARRS 1	BAR	890 m	MPC · JPL
756480	2019 NC_{6}	—	November 2, 2005	Catalina	CSS	·	970 m	MPC · JPL
756481	2019 NT_{9}	—	July 7, 2019	Haleakala	Pan-STARRS 1	·	1.3 km	MPC · JPL
756482	2019 NH_{11}	—	April 29, 2014	Cerro Tololo	DECam	·	1.4 km	MPC · JPL
756483	2019 NN_{11}	—	March 20, 2015	Haleakala	Pan-STARRS 1	L4	5.9 km	MPC · JPL
756484	2019 NQ_{14}	—	September 12, 2016	Haleakala	Pan-STARRS 1	·	630 m	MPC · JPL
756485	2019 NY_{14}	—	June 3, 2014	Haleakala	Pan-STARRS 1	·	1.4 km	MPC · JPL
756486	2019 NZ_{21}	—	June 30, 2014	Mayhill-ISON	L. Elenin	·	1.8 km	MPC · JPL
756487	2019 NM_{22}	—	October 9, 2008	Mount Lemmon	Mount Lemmon Survey	·	2.0 km	MPC · JPL
756488	2019 NW_{37}	—	June 24, 2014	Haleakala	Pan-STARRS 1	EUN	1 km	MPC · JPL
756489	2019 NB_{38}	—	July 10, 2019	Haleakala	Pan-STARRS 1	·	2.1 km	MPC · JPL
756490	2019 NH_{38}	—	July 7, 2019	Haleakala	Pan-STARRS 1	·	1.9 km	MPC · JPL
756491	2019 NL_{38}	—	April 23, 2014	Cerro Tololo	DECam	·	720 m	MPC · JPL
756492	2019 NZ_{38}	—	July 7, 2019	Haleakala	Pan-STARRS 1	HOF	1.9 km	MPC · JPL
756493	2019 ND_{39}	—	April 29, 2014	Cerro Tololo	DECam	·	1.1 km	MPC · JPL
756494	2019 NT_{39}	—	July 10, 2019	Mount Lemmon	Mount Lemmon Survey	·	1.9 km	MPC · JPL
756495	2019 NL_{42}	—	June 2, 2014	Haleakala	Pan-STARRS 1	·	1.4 km	MPC · JPL
756496	2019 NV_{47}	—	July 4, 2019	Haleakala	Pan-STARRS 1	L4	7.0 km	MPC · JPL
756497	2019 NM_{51}	—	December 4, 2016	Mount Lemmon	Mount Lemmon Survey	·	720 m	MPC · JPL
756498	2019 NU_{51}	—	July 4, 2019	Haleakala	Pan-STARRS 2	L4	7.0 km	MPC · JPL
756499	2019 ND_{53}	—	July 1, 2019	Haleakala	Pan-STARRS 1	·	1.6 km	MPC · JPL
756500	2019 NU_{79}	—	January 18, 2012	Kitt Peak	Spacewatch	·	2.0 km	MPC · JPL

== 756501–756600 ==
back to top

Designation			Discovery			Properties		Ref
Permanent	Provisional	Named after	Date	Site	Discoverer(s)	Category	Diam.	Ref
756501	2019 NX_{79}	—	July 7, 2019	Haleakala	Pan-STARRS 1	·	1.1 km	MPC · JPL
756502	2019 NU_{81}	—	November 19, 2007	Kitt Peak	Spacewatch	·	1 km	MPC · JPL
756503	2019 NS_{82}	—	January 16, 2009	Kitt Peak	Spacewatch	·	1.5 km	MPC · JPL
756504	2019 OV_{4}	—	June 30, 2019	Haleakala	Pan-STARRS 2	·	1.3 km	MPC · JPL
756505	2019 OP_{5}	—	December 25, 2005	Kitt Peak	Spacewatch	3:2 · SHU	4.5 km	MPC · JPL
756506	2019 OF_{6}	—	November 17, 2009	Kitt Peak	Spacewatch	·	2.0 km	MPC · JPL
756507	2019 OD_{8}	—	January 31, 2006	Kitt Peak	Spacewatch	·	2.2 km	MPC · JPL
756508	2019 OR_{8}	—	April 16, 2007	Mount Lemmon	Mount Lemmon Survey	THM	1.6 km	MPC · JPL
756509 Zoltandeak	2019 OG_{9}	Zoltandeak	June 9, 2014	La Palma	EURONEAR	·	1.3 km	MPC · JPL
756510	2019 OL_{9}	—	October 24, 2014	Mount Lemmon	Mount Lemmon Survey	·	2.1 km	MPC · JPL
756511	2019 OA_{15}	—	August 21, 2010	Siding Spring	SSS	·	1.6 km	MPC · JPL
756512	2019 OD_{15}	—	October 16, 2006	Kitt Peak	Spacewatch	·	1.0 km	MPC · JPL
756513	2019 OO_{16}	—	December 30, 2008	Mount Lemmon	Mount Lemmon Survey	EUN	1.2 km	MPC · JPL
756514	2019 OB_{17}	—	July 28, 2019	Haleakala	Pan-STARRS 2	·	2.4 km	MPC · JPL
756515	2019 OC_{17}	—	February 2, 2013	Mount Lemmon	Mount Lemmon Survey	·	1.4 km	MPC · JPL
756516	2019 OT_{20}	—	July 26, 2015	Haleakala	Pan-STARRS 2	·	1.5 km	MPC · JPL
756517	2019 OU_{23}	—	July 28, 2019	Haleakala	Pan-STARRS 2	PHO	770 m	MPC · JPL
756518	2019 OU_{27}	—	July 25, 2019	Haleakala	Pan-STARRS 1	L4	6.8 km	MPC · JPL
756519	2019 PG_{3}	—	August 9, 2019	Haleakala	Pan-STARRS 2	AMO +1km	1.2 km	MPC · JPL
756520	2019 PA_{4}	—	May 23, 2001	Cerro Tololo	Deep Ecliptic Survey	·	1.3 km	MPC · JPL
756521	2019 PO_{5}	—	January 28, 2017	Haleakala	Pan-STARRS 1	(43176)	2.1 km	MPC · JPL
756522	2019 PQ_{5}	—	July 4, 2014	Haleakala	Pan-STARRS 1	·	1.2 km	MPC · JPL
756523	2019 PW_{9}	—	November 23, 2011	Mayhill-ISON	L. Elenin	·	1.3 km	MPC · JPL
756524	2019 PX_{11}	—	August 21, 2006	Kitt Peak	Spacewatch	·	1.3 km	MPC · JPL
756525	2019 PS_{13}	—	January 31, 2017	Mount Lemmon	Mount Lemmon Survey	·	2.4 km	MPC · JPL
756526	2019 PU_{16}	—	November 14, 2002	Palomar Mountain	NEAT	·	1.5 km	MPC · JPL
756527	2019 PG_{23}	—	March 26, 2011	Mount Lemmon	Mount Lemmon Survey	V	590 m	MPC · JPL
756528	2019 PU_{26}	—	November 17, 2006	Mount Lemmon	Mount Lemmon Survey	·	630 m	MPC · JPL
756529	2019 PT_{32}	—	May 23, 2014	Haleakala	Pan-STARRS 1	·	1.2 km	MPC · JPL
756530	2019 PX_{32}	—	August 5, 2019	Haleakala	Pan-STARRS 1	·	1.6 km	MPC · JPL
756531	2019 PO_{33}	—	August 9, 2019	Haleakala	Pan-STARRS 2	·	1.7 km	MPC · JPL
756532	2019 PW_{33}	—	August 4, 2019	Haleakala	Pan-STARRS 1	·	1.2 km	MPC · JPL
756533	2019 PB_{38}	—	August 12, 2019	Haleakala	Pan-STARRS 1	·	2.0 km	MPC · JPL
756534	2019 PZ_{45}	—	July 1, 2019	Haleakala	Pan-STARRS 1	·	1.3 km	MPC · JPL
756535	2019 QG_{9}	—	August 7, 2004	Palomar	NEAT	·	850 m	MPC · JPL
756536	2019 QS_{9}	—	February 14, 2013	Haleakala	Pan-STARRS 1	·	1.3 km	MPC · JPL
756537	2019 QC_{11}	—	July 1, 2019	Haleakala	Pan-STARRS 1	·	1.4 km	MPC · JPL
756538	2019 QR_{11}	—	January 4, 2016	Haleakala	Pan-STARRS 1	·	2.5 km	MPC · JPL
756539	2019 QA_{12}	—	March 13, 2012	Mount Lemmon	Mount Lemmon Survey	BRA	1 km	MPC · JPL
756540	2019 QD_{12}	—	July 30, 2014	Haleakala	Pan-STARRS 1	BRA	970 m	MPC · JPL
756541	2019 QZ_{12}	—	October 9, 2008	Catalina	CSS	·	2.4 km	MPC · JPL
756542	2019 QQ_{13}	—	August 27, 2019	Mount Lemmon	Mount Lemmon Survey	·	1.9 km	MPC · JPL
756543	2019 QU_{14}	—	August 26, 2019	Haleakala	Pan-STARRS 2	·	2.6 km	MPC · JPL
756544	2019 QJ_{27}	—	October 10, 2012	Mount Lemmon	Mount Lemmon Survey	·	1.3 km	MPC · JPL
756545	2019 QR_{30}	—	August 31, 2019	Haleakala	Pan-STARRS 1	·	660 m	MPC · JPL
756546	2019 QK_{32}	—	August 27, 2019	Mount Lemmon	Mount Lemmon Survey	·	2.1 km	MPC · JPL
756547	2019 QG_{33}	—	August 26, 2019	Haleakala	Pan-STARRS 2	EOS	1.7 km	MPC · JPL
756548	2019 QS_{40}	—	February 7, 2011	Mount Lemmon	Mount Lemmon Survey	·	1.5 km	MPC · JPL
756549	2019 QZ_{49}	—	August 29, 2019	Haleakala	Pan-STARRS 1	·	1.0 km	MPC · JPL
756550	2019 QC_{55}	—	August 28, 2019	Cerro Tololo	DECam	·	1.7 km	MPC · JPL
756551	2019 QX_{59}	—	August 28, 2019	Haleakala	Pan-STARRS 1	·	1.0 km	MPC · JPL
756552	2019 QE_{70}	—	November 8, 2009	Mount Lemmon	Mount Lemmon Survey	L4	5.8 km	MPC · JPL
756553	2019 QS_{70}	—	February 28, 2008	Mount Lemmon	Mount Lemmon Survey	NEM	1.6 km	MPC · JPL
756554	2019 RB_{6}	—	March 6, 2011	Mount Lemmon	Mount Lemmon Survey	·	3.3 km	MPC · JPL
756555	2019 RV_{6}	—	June 18, 2013	Mount Lemmon	Mount Lemmon Survey	·	2.3 km	MPC · JPL
756556	2019 RY_{9}	—	September 29, 2008	Mauna Kea	P. A. Wiegert	·	2.2 km	MPC · JPL
756557	2019 RJ_{14}	—	August 14, 2013	Haleakala	Pan-STARRS 1	·	2.6 km	MPC · JPL
756558	2019 RF_{16}	—	January 27, 2007	Kitt Peak	Spacewatch	·	2.2 km	MPC · JPL
756559	2019 RY_{20}	—	July 31, 2009	Kitt Peak	Spacewatch	·	1.6 km	MPC · JPL
756560	2019 RD_{28}	—	April 8, 2002	Palomar	NEAT	·	1.6 km	MPC · JPL
756561	2019 RU_{28}	—	September 8, 2019	Haleakala	Pan-STARRS 1	·	1.1 km	MPC · JPL
756562	2019 RW_{28}	—	September 7, 2019	Mount Lemmon	Mount Lemmon Survey	·	940 m	MPC · JPL
756563	2019 RN_{32}	—	September 4, 2019	Mount Lemmon	Mount Lemmon Survey	·	2.4 km	MPC · JPL
756564	2019 RL_{34}	—	October 8, 2008	Mount Lemmon	Mount Lemmon Survey	·	2.7 km	MPC · JPL
756565	2019 RO_{36}	—	September 1, 2019	Mount Lemmon	Mount Lemmon Survey	·	740 m	MPC · JPL
756566	2019 RP_{36}	—	September 6, 2019	Haleakala	Pan-STARRS 1	·	2.0 km	MPC · JPL
756567	2019 RW_{48}	—	July 4, 2018	Haleakala	Pan-STARRS 2	·	1.8 km	MPC · JPL
756568	2019 RZ_{59}	—	September 5, 2019	Mount Lemmon	Mount Lemmon Survey	·	1.5 km	MPC · JPL
756569	2019 RN_{74}	—	September 6, 2019	Haleakala	Pan-STARRS 1	·	1.1 km	MPC · JPL
756570	2019 RC_{81}	—	December 11, 2010	Mount Lemmon	Mount Lemmon Survey	THM	1.7 km	MPC · JPL
756571	2019 RG_{81}	—	April 10, 2013	Haleakala	Pan-STARRS 1	·	1.4 km	MPC · JPL
756572	2019 SU_{11}	—	September 3, 2013	Mount Lemmon	Mount Lemmon Survey	TIR	2.3 km	MPC · JPL
756573	2019 SV_{11}	—	March 10, 2016	Mount Lemmon	Mount Lemmon Survey	·	2.8 km	MPC · JPL
756574	2019 SO_{12}	—	May 29, 2019	Haleakala	Pan-STARRS 1	·	2.0 km	MPC · JPL
756575	2019 SJ_{22}	—	January 18, 2016	Haleakala	Pan-STARRS 1	·	2.7 km	MPC · JPL
756576	2019 SG_{30}	—	May 13, 2012	Mount Lemmon	Mount Lemmon Survey	·	2.5 km	MPC · JPL
756577	2019 SS_{32}	—	October 22, 2003	Kitt Peak	Spacewatch	·	2.1 km	MPC · JPL
756578	2019 SR_{35}	—	October 9, 2008	Mount Lemmon	Mount Lemmon Survey	·	1.9 km	MPC · JPL
756579	2019 SR_{37}	—	November 20, 2014	Haleakala	Pan-STARRS 1	·	1.9 km	MPC · JPL
756580	2019 SV_{38}	—	May 9, 2005	Cerro Tololo	Deep Ecliptic Survey	·	2.7 km	MPC · JPL
756581	2019 SC_{50}	—	January 13, 2016	Haleakala	Pan-STARRS 1	·	1.4 km	MPC · JPL
756582	2019 SH_{52}	—	September 21, 2009	Mount Lemmon	Mount Lemmon Survey	KOR	1.1 km	MPC · JPL
756583	2019 SL_{55}	—	November 17, 2014	Mount Lemmon	Mount Lemmon Survey	·	2.1 km	MPC · JPL
756584	2019 SW_{62}	—	September 26, 2014	Kitt Peak	Spacewatch	·	1.7 km	MPC · JPL
756585	2019 SO_{64}	—	May 1, 2016	Cerro Tololo	DECam	·	2.3 km	MPC · JPL
756586	2019 SJ_{67}	—	October 24, 2015	Mount Lemmon	Mount Lemmon Survey	BRG	1.2 km	MPC · JPL
756587	2019 SF_{82}	—	April 18, 2015	Cerro Tololo	DECam	3:2	3.5 km	MPC · JPL
756588	2019 SZ_{82}	—	September 28, 2019	Mount Lemmon	Mount Lemmon Survey	·	1.6 km	MPC · JPL
756589	2019 SE_{83}	—	September 24, 2019	Haleakala	Pan-STARRS 1	·	1.0 km	MPC · JPL
756590	2019 SF_{83}	—	September 24, 2019	Haleakala	Pan-STARRS 1	·	1.5 km	MPC · JPL
756591	2019 SD_{84}	—	September 25, 2019	Haleakala	Pan-STARRS 1	·	2.2 km	MPC · JPL
756592	2019 SF_{90}	—	September 28, 2019	Mount Lemmon	Mount Lemmon Survey	·	2.9 km	MPC · JPL
756593	2019 SW_{92}	—	September 19, 2008	Kitt Peak	Spacewatch	·	2.2 km	MPC · JPL
756594	2019 ST_{105}	—	September 20, 2019	Mount Lemmon	Mount Lemmon Survey	·	1.1 km	MPC · JPL
756595	2019 SP_{108}	—	April 10, 2016	Haleakala	Pan-STARRS 1	EUP	2.2 km	MPC · JPL
756596	2019 SA_{109}	—	March 4, 2016	Mount Lemmon	Mount Lemmon Survey	·	2.0 km	MPC · JPL
756597	2019 SL_{156}	—	September 28, 2019	Mount Lemmon	Mount Lemmon Survey	MAR	950 m	MPC · JPL
756598	2019 SL_{179}	—	September 28, 2019	Mount Lemmon	Mount Lemmon Survey	EUN	1.1 km	MPC · JPL
756599	2019 TJ_{8}	—	July 12, 2016	Mount Lemmon	Mount Lemmon Survey	H	500 m	MPC · JPL
756600	2019 TU_{8}	—	August 24, 2008	Kitt Peak	Spacewatch	·	2.9 km	MPC · JPL

== 756601–756700 ==
back to top

Designation			Discovery			Properties		Ref
Permanent	Provisional	Named after	Date	Site	Discoverer(s)	Category	Diam.	Ref
756601	2019 TV_{8}	—	September 23, 2008	Catalina	CSS	·	2.5 km	MPC · JPL
756602	2019 TX_{8}	—	December 20, 2014	Haleakala	Pan-STARRS 1	·	1.8 km	MPC · JPL
756603	2019 TR_{10}	—	February 14, 2016	Haleakala	Pan-STARRS 1	·	2.7 km	MPC · JPL
756604	2019 TR_{12}	—	September 28, 2008	Socorro	LINEAR	·	1.7 km	MPC · JPL
756605	2019 TV_{12}	—	November 2, 2008	Mount Lemmon	Mount Lemmon Survey	·	3.1 km	MPC · JPL
756606	2019 TY_{14}	—	September 30, 2005	Mount Lemmon	Mount Lemmon Survey	·	1.6 km	MPC · JPL
756607	2019 TZ_{15}	—	September 24, 2008	Mount Lemmon	Mount Lemmon Survey	·	2.2 km	MPC · JPL
756608	2019 TA_{17}	—	November 22, 2008	Kitt Peak	Spacewatch	·	2.2 km	MPC · JPL
756609	2019 TA_{18}	—	March 10, 2011	Kitt Peak	Spacewatch	·	2.5 km	MPC · JPL
756610	2019 TN_{20}	—	September 28, 2000	Kitt Peak	Spacewatch	·	1.6 km	MPC · JPL
756611	2019 TK_{21}	—	September 18, 2011	Mount Lemmon	Mount Lemmon Survey	3:2	4.6 km	MPC · JPL
756612	2019 TR_{21}	—	November 2, 2008	Mount Lemmon	Mount Lemmon Survey	VER	2.3 km	MPC · JPL
756613	2019 TC_{24}	—	September 9, 2013	Haleakala	Pan-STARRS 1	·	2.4 km	MPC · JPL
756614	2019 TD_{24}	—	December 13, 2010	Mount Lemmon	Mount Lemmon Survey	·	1.6 km	MPC · JPL
756615	2019 TK_{25}	—	September 23, 2008	Mount Lemmon	Mount Lemmon Survey	·	1.8 km	MPC · JPL
756616	2019 TF_{27}	—	March 19, 2017	Haleakala	Pan-STARRS 1	EOS	1.5 km	MPC · JPL
756617	2019 TH_{28}	—	November 19, 2009	Kitt Peak	Spacewatch	EOS	1.4 km	MPC · JPL
756618	2019 TO_{33}	—	October 5, 2019	Haleakala	Pan-STARRS 2	EOS	1.5 km	MPC · JPL
756619	2019 TJ_{34}	—	October 6, 2019	Haleakala	Pan-STARRS 1	PHO	660 m	MPC · JPL
756620	2019 TL_{34}	—	April 2, 2016	Haleakala	Pan-STARRS 1	·	1.7 km	MPC · JPL
756621	2019 TN_{34}	—	October 9, 2019	Haleakala	Pan-STARRS 1	·	3.1 km	MPC · JPL
756622	2019 TT_{34}	—	October 9, 2019	Mount Lemmon	Mount Lemmon Survey	·	2.6 km	MPC · JPL
756623	2019 TN_{37}	—	October 5, 2019	Haleakala	Pan-STARRS 1	·	1.5 km	MPC · JPL
756624	2019 TJ_{40}	—	September 4, 2019	Mount Lemmon	Mount Lemmon Survey	LIX	2.7 km	MPC · JPL
756625	2019 TS_{49}	—	February 11, 2016	Haleakala	Pan-STARRS 1	EOS	1.4 km	MPC · JPL
756626	2019 TZ_{53}	—	January 3, 2016	Haleakala	Pan-STARRS 1	·	2.1 km	MPC · JPL
756627	2019 TK_{69}	—	October 5, 2019	Haleakala	Pan-STARRS 1	·	1.3 km	MPC · JPL
756628	2019 UK_{1}	—	December 16, 2017	Mount Lemmon	Mount Lemmon Survey	H	460 m	MPC · JPL
756629	2019 UJ_{4}	—	October 6, 2019	Mount Lemmon	Mount Lemmon Survey	H	590 m	MPC · JPL
756630	2019 UV_{14}	—	May 15, 2016	Haleakala	Pan-STARRS 1	·	1.3 km	MPC · JPL
756631	2019 UC_{16}	—	November 19, 2014	Mount Lemmon	Mount Lemmon Survey	EOS	1.5 km	MPC · JPL
756632	2019 UM_{16}	—	October 21, 2008	Mount Lemmon	Mount Lemmon Survey	·	2.1 km	MPC · JPL
756633	2019 UU_{16}	—	October 31, 2008	Mount Lemmon	Mount Lemmon Survey	·	2.4 km	MPC · JPL
756634	2019 UV_{16}	—	October 9, 2013	Haleakala	Pan-STARRS 1	·	2.7 km	MPC · JPL
756635	2019 UE_{17}	—	October 27, 2008	Mount Lemmon	Mount Lemmon Survey	·	2.1 km	MPC · JPL
756636	2019 UR_{18}	—	October 31, 2008	Kitt Peak	Spacewatch	·	2.2 km	MPC · JPL
756637	2019 UD_{20}	—	October 21, 2019	Cerro Paranal	Altmann, M., Prusti, T.	·	1.3 km	MPC · JPL
756638	2019 UV_{21}	—	October 25, 2013	Mount Lemmon	Mount Lemmon Survey	·	2.5 km	MPC · JPL
756639	2019 UY_{21}	—	March 5, 2017	Haleakala	Pan-STARRS 1	·	1.8 km	MPC · JPL
756640	2019 UB_{25}	—	November 25, 2014	Haleakala	Pan-STARRS 1	·	2.1 km	MPC · JPL
756641	2019 UL_{25}	—	November 9, 2008	Kitt Peak	Spacewatch	·	2.3 km	MPC · JPL
756642	2019 UK_{26}	—	February 16, 2004	Kitt Peak	Spacewatch	VER	2.6 km	MPC · JPL
756643	2019 UG_{27}	—	March 30, 2008	Kitt Peak	Spacewatch	·	1.5 km	MPC · JPL
756644	2019 UO_{33}	—	October 22, 2019	Mount Lemmon	Mount Lemmon Survey	EOS	1.5 km	MPC · JPL
756645	2019 US_{33}	—	October 24, 2019	Mount Lemmon	Mount Lemmon Survey	·	2.5 km	MPC · JPL
756646	2019 UC_{34}	—	January 9, 2016	Haleakala	Pan-STARRS 1	·	2.5 km	MPC · JPL
756647	2019 UD_{34}	—	April 3, 2016	Haleakala	Pan-STARRS 1	EOS	1.4 km	MPC · JPL
756648	2019 UF_{34}	—	October 26, 2019	Mount Lemmon	Mount Lemmon Survey	·	2.3 km	MPC · JPL
756649	2019 UG_{34}	—	March 6, 2016	Haleakala	Pan-STARRS 1	·	2.8 km	MPC · JPL
756650	2019 UK_{34}	—	October 24, 2019	Haleakala	Pan-STARRS 1	EOS	1.4 km	MPC · JPL
756651	2019 UJ_{35}	—	October 24, 2019	Haleakala	Pan-STARRS 1	·	2.3 km	MPC · JPL
756652	2019 UP_{37}	—	October 23, 2019	Mount Lemmon	Mount Lemmon Survey	LIX	2.4 km	MPC · JPL
756653	2019 UY_{42}	—	June 15, 2010	Mount Lemmon	Mount Lemmon Survey	·	1.3 km	MPC · JPL
756654	2019 UT_{44}	—	August 22, 2014	Haleakala	Pan-STARRS 1	·	1.3 km	MPC · JPL
756655	2019 UP_{45}	—	October 23, 2019	Mount Lemmon	Mount Lemmon Survey	TIR	2.3 km	MPC · JPL
756656	2019 UV_{89}	—	March 18, 2016	Mount Lemmon	Mount Lemmon Survey	·	1.8 km	MPC · JPL
756657	2019 UH_{99}	—	October 26, 2019	Haleakala	Pan-STARRS 1	·	700 m	MPC · JPL
756658	2019 UC_{101}	—	October 24, 2019	Haleakala	Pan-STARRS 1	·	1.3 km	MPC · JPL
756659	2019 UC_{105}	—	October 25, 2019	Haleakala	Pan-STARRS 1	·	550 m	MPC · JPL
756660	2019 UX_{110}	—	June 13, 2018	Haleakala	Pan-STARRS 1	·	1.8 km	MPC · JPL
756661	2019 VG	—	January 20, 2018	Haleakala	Pan-STARRS 1	H	380 m	MPC · JPL
756662	2019 VT_{9}	—	May 1, 2016	Cerro Tololo	DECam	·	2.7 km	MPC · JPL
756663	2019 VQ_{17}	—	November 2, 2019	Haleakala	Pan-STARRS 1	TIR	2.5 km	MPC · JPL
756664	2019 VL_{23}	—	November 2, 2019	Haleakala	Pan-STARRS 1	·	2.9 km	MPC · JPL
756665	2019 VA_{31}	—	April 4, 2003	Kitt Peak	Spacewatch	·	1.0 km	MPC · JPL
756666	2019 WK_{7}	—	November 28, 2019	Haleakala	Pan-STARRS 1	H	410 m	MPC · JPL
756667	2019 WV_{7}	—	November 19, 2009	Kitt Peak	Spacewatch	GAL	1.4 km	MPC · JPL
756668	2019 WN_{8}	—	November 28, 2019	Haleakala	Pan-STARRS 1	T_{j} (2.99)	3.1 km	MPC · JPL
756669	2019 XG_{4}	—	July 9, 2018	Haleakala	Pan-STARRS 1	H	500 m	MPC · JPL
756670	2019 XS_{11}	—	November 26, 2014	Haleakala	Pan-STARRS 1	·	2.1 km	MPC · JPL
756671	2019 XN_{12}	—	December 3, 2019	Mount Lemmon	Mount Lemmon Survey	·	1.2 km	MPC · JPL
756672	2019 YU_{6}	—	December 31, 2019	Pleasant Groves	Holbrook, M.	·	510 m	MPC · JPL
756673	2019 YB_{8}	—	April 18, 2015	Cerro Tololo	DECam	·	1.9 km	MPC · JPL
756674	2019 YQ_{36}	—	December 17, 2019	Mount Lemmon	Mount Lemmon Survey	·	2.5 km	MPC · JPL
756675	2019 YC_{42}	—	August 11, 2018	Haleakala	Pan-STARRS 1	EOS	1.5 km	MPC · JPL
756676	2020 AY_{4}	—	January 28, 2015	Haleakala	Pan-STARRS 1	·	2.2 km	MPC · JPL
756677	2020 AC_{5}	—	May 18, 2015	Haleakala	Pan-STARRS 1	·	2.3 km	MPC · JPL
756678	2020 AE_{5}	—	January 1, 2020	Haleakala	Pan-STARRS 1	·	2.6 km	MPC · JPL
756679	2020 BG_{17}	—	February 20, 2009	Mount Lemmon	Mount Lemmon Survey	·	2.3 km	MPC · JPL
756680	2020 BU_{18}	—	January 29, 2020	Mount Lemmon	Mount Lemmon Survey	·	2.7 km	MPC · JPL
756681	2020 BG_{20}	—	April 23, 2015	Haleakala	Pan-STARRS 1	·	2.3 km	MPC · JPL
756682	2020 BV_{20}	—	January 28, 2020	Mount Lemmon	Mount Lemmon Survey	H	370 m	MPC · JPL
756683	2020 BE_{22}	—	January 19, 2020	Haleakala	Pan-STARRS 1	·	2.7 km	MPC · JPL
756684	2020 BR_{29}	—	October 21, 2018	Mount Lemmon	Mount Lemmon Survey	·	2.2 km	MPC · JPL
756685	2020 BR_{41}	—	March 14, 2016	Mount Lemmon	Mount Lemmon Survey	·	1.4 km	MPC · JPL
756686	2020 BV_{44}	—	February 20, 2009	Mount Lemmon	Mount Lemmon Survey	VER	2.2 km	MPC · JPL
756687	2020 BY_{45}	—	August 15, 2013	Haleakala	Pan-STARRS 1	·	1.4 km	MPC · JPL
756688	2020 BX_{56}	—	April 10, 2015	Mount Lemmon	Mount Lemmon Survey	·	2.2 km	MPC · JPL
756689	2020 BA_{65}	—	July 30, 2000	Cerro Tololo	Deep Ecliptic Survey	·	2.5 km	MPC · JPL
756690	2020 BD_{73}	—	November 28, 2013	Mount Lemmon	Mount Lemmon Survey	·	2.5 km	MPC · JPL
756691	2020 BS_{73}	—	January 13, 2010	WISE	WISE	·	2.8 km	MPC · JPL
756692	2020 BO_{80}	—	January 21, 2020	Haleakala	Pan-STARRS 1	·	2.3 km	MPC · JPL
756693	2020 BG_{84}	—	January 17, 2015	Haleakala	Pan-STARRS 1	EOS	1.5 km	MPC · JPL
756694	2020 BG_{90}	—	January 23, 2020	Haleakala	Pan-STARRS 1	H	380 m	MPC · JPL
756695	2020 BA_{93}	—	April 8, 2019	Haleakala	Pan-STARRS 1	L5	8.9 km	MPC · JPL
756696	2020 BU_{103}	—	October 12, 2007	Mount Lemmon	Mount Lemmon Survey	·	2.2 km	MPC · JPL
756697	2020 BF_{110}	—	January 24, 2020	Mount Lemmon	Mount Lemmon Survey	·	1.7 km	MPC · JPL
756698	2020 BE_{124}	—	October 1, 2008	Mount Lemmon	Mount Lemmon Survey	·	1.2 km	MPC · JPL
756699	2020 CO_{5}	—	January 25, 2012	Haleakala	Pan-STARRS 1	H	420 m	MPC · JPL
756700	2020 CF_{7}	—	December 29, 2014	Haleakala	Pan-STARRS 1	·	1.6 km	MPC · JPL

== 756701–756800 ==
back to top

Designation			Discovery			Properties		Ref
Permanent	Provisional	Named after	Date	Site	Discoverer(s)	Category	Diam.	Ref
756701	2020 DU_{10}	—	April 18, 2015	Cerro Tololo	DECam	·	2.4 km	MPC · JPL
756702	2020 DO_{12}	—	April 18, 2015	Cerro Tololo	DECam	VER	2.3 km	MPC · JPL
756703	2020 FE_{8}	—	July 27, 2017	Haleakala	Pan-STARRS 1	·	520 m	MPC · JPL
756704	2020 FQ_{8}	—	April 20, 2015	Haleakala	Pan-STARRS 1	·	1.5 km	MPC · JPL
756705	2020 FT_{8}	—	October 9, 2012	Mount Lemmon	Mount Lemmon Survey	L5	6.9 km	MPC · JPL
756706	2020 FJ_{9}	—	March 21, 2020	Haleakala	Pan-STARRS 2	·	510 m	MPC · JPL
756707	2020 FJ_{12}	—	March 23, 2020	Haleakala	Pan-STARRS 2	L5	8.1 km	MPC · JPL
756708	2020 FB_{14}	—	February 27, 2016	Mount Lemmon	Mount Lemmon Survey	·	740 m	MPC · JPL
756709	2020 FD_{19}	—	March 27, 2017	Haleakala	Pan-STARRS 1	·	670 m	MPC · JPL
756710	2020 GN_{3}	—	April 2, 2020	Haleakala	Pan-STARRS 1	AMO	500 m	MPC · JPL
756711	2020 GP_{4}	—	April 15, 2020	Mount Lemmon	Mount Lemmon Survey	·	2.4 km	MPC · JPL
756712	2020 GD_{14}	—	August 14, 2017	Haleakala	Pan-STARRS 1	·	670 m	MPC · JPL
756713	2020 HK_{9}	—	January 27, 2017	Haleakala	Pan-STARRS 1	L5	7.0 km	MPC · JPL
756714	2020 HU_{11}	—	April 16, 2020	Haleakala	Pan-STARRS 2	PHO	580 m	MPC · JPL
756715	2020 HG_{12}	—	April 6, 2019	Haleakala	Pan-STARRS 1	L5	6.3 km	MPC · JPL
756716	2020 HE_{14}	—	November 20, 2014	Haleakala	Pan-STARRS 1	L5	6.7 km	MPC · JPL
756717	2020 HN_{14}	—	April 20, 2020	Haleakala	Pan-STARRS 1	L5	7.1 km	MPC · JPL
756718	2020 HF_{16}	—	April 14, 2016	Haleakala	Pan-STARRS 1	·	960 m	MPC · JPL
756719	2020 HA_{17}	—	May 4, 2009	Mount Lemmon	Mount Lemmon Survey	TIR	2.2 km	MPC · JPL
756720	2020 HF_{19}	—	January 4, 2019	Haleakala	Pan-STARRS 1	·	2.4 km	MPC · JPL
756721	2020 HE_{20}	—	September 25, 2016	Haleakala	Pan-STARRS 1	·	2.4 km	MPC · JPL
756722	2020 HN_{20}	—	April 1, 2014	Mount Lemmon	Mount Lemmon Survey	·	2.1 km	MPC · JPL
756723	2020 HK_{21}	—	August 14, 2012	Haleakala	Pan-STARRS 1	·	970 m	MPC · JPL
756724	2020 HO_{21}	—	April 6, 2008	Mount Lemmon	Mount Lemmon Survey	L5	6.1 km	MPC · JPL
756725	2020 HR_{21}	—	October 24, 2014	Mount Lemmon	Mount Lemmon Survey	L5 · (291316)	7.5 km	MPC · JPL
756726	2020 HN_{22}	—	July 12, 2013	Haleakala	Pan-STARRS 1	·	940 m	MPC · JPL
756727	2020 HX_{27}	—	November 2, 2013	Kitt Peak	Spacewatch	L5	7.8 km	MPC · JPL
756728	2020 HD_{33}	—	September 16, 2009	Mount Lemmon	Mount Lemmon Survey	·	2.5 km	MPC · JPL
756729	2020 HF_{37}	—	April 18, 2020	Haleakala	Pan-STARRS 1	L5	7.5 km	MPC · JPL
756730	2020 HV_{39}	—	September 22, 2016	Mount Lemmon	Mount Lemmon Survey	·	2.2 km	MPC · JPL
756731	2020 HT_{40}	—	August 20, 2014	Haleakala	Pan-STARRS 1	·	540 m	MPC · JPL
756732	2020 HZ_{40}	—	April 16, 2020	Mount Lemmon	Mount Lemmon Survey	L5	6.6 km	MPC · JPL
756733	2020 HN_{41}	—	October 3, 2013	Mount Lemmon	Mount Lemmon Survey	L5	6.7 km	MPC · JPL
756734	2020 HV_{53}	—	April 9, 2013	Haleakala	Pan-STARRS 1	·	500 m	MPC · JPL
756735	2020 HX_{54}	—	March 29, 2019	Mount Lemmon	Mount Lemmon Survey	L5	6.8 km	MPC · JPL
756736	2020 HB_{57}	—	April 21, 2020	Haleakala	Pan-STARRS 2	L5	6.7 km	MPC · JPL
756737	2020 HS_{60}	—	April 22, 2020	Mount Lemmon	Mount Lemmon Survey	L5	6.5 km	MPC · JPL
756738	2020 HY_{67}	—	April 16, 2020	Mount Lemmon	Mount Lemmon Survey	L5	6.0 km	MPC · JPL
756739	2020 HA_{68}	—	September 14, 2017	Haleakala	Pan-STARRS 1	·	610 m	MPC · JPL
756740	2020 HK_{77}	—	April 22, 2020	Mount Lemmon	Mount Lemmon Survey	L5	7.5 km	MPC · JPL
756741	2020 HR_{92}	—	April 20, 2020	Haleakala	Pan-STARRS 1	L5	7.5 km	MPC · JPL
756742	2020 HE_{102}	—	April 5, 2019	Haleakala	Pan-STARRS 1	L5	7.0 km	MPC · JPL
756743	2020 HW_{104}	—	November 22, 2014	Mount Lemmon	Mount Lemmon Survey	·	890 m	MPC · JPL
756744	2020 HK_{110}	—	April 21, 2020	Haleakala	Pan-STARRS 2	L5	6.2 km	MPC · JPL
756745	2020 HV_{113}	—	April 19, 2020	Haleakala	Pan-STARRS 1	L5	7.3 km	MPC · JPL
756746	2020 HW_{115}	—	October 11, 2012	Haleakala	Pan-STARRS 1	L5	5.5 km	MPC · JPL
756747	2020 HY_{116}	—	April 23, 2020	Mount Lemmon	Mount Lemmon Survey	L5	6.5 km	MPC · JPL
756748	2020 HY_{138}	—	October 24, 2011	Kitt Peak	Spacewatch	TIR	2.3 km	MPC · JPL
756749	2020 HR_{154}	—	October 27, 2016	Haleakala	Pan-STARRS 1	·	2.8 km	MPC · JPL
756750	2020 JL_{5}	—	January 25, 2020	Haleakala	Pan-STARRS 1	L5	8.0 km	MPC · JPL
756751	2020 JD_{8}	—	February 1, 2012	Mount Lemmon	Mount Lemmon Survey	·	840 m	MPC · JPL
756752	2020 JL_{8}	—	November 2, 2013	Mount Lemmon	Mount Lemmon Survey	L5	9.7 km	MPC · JPL
756753	2020 JW_{12}	—	March 2, 2009	Mount Lemmon	Mount Lemmon Survey	·	720 m	MPC · JPL
756754	2020 JL_{17}	—	May 4, 2020	Haleakala	Pan-STARRS 1	·	1.1 km	MPC · JPL
756755	2020 JF_{26}	—	September 12, 2016	Haleakala	Pan-STARRS 1	VER	2.1 km	MPC · JPL
756756	2020 JX_{26}	—	May 14, 2020	Haleakala	Pan-STARRS 1	L5	8.9 km	MPC · JPL
756757	2020 JC_{28}	—	May 14, 2020	Haleakala	Pan-STARRS 1	·	2.2 km	MPC · JPL
756758	2020 JQ_{35}	—	October 3, 2013	Kitt Peak	Spacewatch	L5	7.4 km	MPC · JPL
756759	2020 KH_{2}	—	December 3, 2008	Mount Lemmon	Mount Lemmon Survey	H	390 m	MPC · JPL
756760	2020 KP_{9}	—	August 31, 2017	Haleakala	Pan-STARRS 1	·	650 m	MPC · JPL
756761	2020 KO_{17}	—	May 26, 2020	Mount Lemmon	Mount Lemmon Survey	·	1.2 km	MPC · JPL
756762	2020 KA_{18}	—	May 29, 2020	Haleakala	Pan-STARRS 2	·	1.1 km	MPC · JPL
756763	2020 KZ_{29}	—	May 21, 2020	Haleakala	Pan-STARRS 1	L5	6.2 km	MPC · JPL
756764	2020 MO_{8}	—	December 9, 2010	Mount Lemmon	Mount Lemmon Survey	·	2.3 km	MPC · JPL
756765	2020 ML_{18}	—	June 17, 2020	Haleakala	Pan-STARRS 2	(5)	1.0 km	MPC · JPL
756766	2020 MH_{23}	—	June 28, 2020	Haleakala	Pan-STARRS 1	·	1.2 km	MPC · JPL
756767	2020 MP_{29}	—	June 29, 2020	Haleakala	Pan-STARRS 1	·	850 m	MPC · JPL
756768	2020 OL_{3}	—	October 19, 2016	Mount Lemmon	Mount Lemmon Survey	BAR	1.2 km	MPC · JPL
756769	2020 OG_{4}	—	July 25, 2020	Haleakala	Pan-STARRS 2	AMO	680 m	MPC · JPL
756770	2020 OG_{5}	—	December 18, 2016	Mount Lemmon	Mount Lemmon Survey	·	1.1 km	MPC · JPL
756771	2020 OX_{9}	—	August 16, 2009	Catalina	CSS	·	930 m	MPC · JPL
756772	2020 OT_{10}	—	November 10, 2016	Kitt Peak	Spacewatch	·	1.0 km	MPC · JPL
756773	2020 OF_{14}	—	July 17, 2020	Haleakala	Pan-STARRS 1	·	970 m	MPC · JPL
756774	2020 OA_{15}	—	July 22, 2020	Haleakala	Pan-STARRS 2	·	990 m	MPC · JPL
756775	2020 OV_{25}	—	July 30, 2020	Mount Lemmon	Mount Lemmon Survey	EUN	700 m	MPC · JPL
756776	2020 OL_{29}	—	July 17, 2020	Haleakala	Pan-STARRS 1	NYS	970 m	MPC · JPL
756777	2020 OF_{33}	—	October 8, 2012	Haleakala	Pan-STARRS 1	·	950 m	MPC · JPL
756778	2020 OC_{41}	—	July 22, 2020	Haleakala	Pan-STARRS 2	·	2.8 km	MPC · JPL
756779	2020 OJ_{41}	—	July 23, 2020	Haleakala	Pan-STARRS 2	·	830 m	MPC · JPL
756780	2020 OR_{62}	—	September 28, 2011	Kitt Peak	Spacewatch	·	1.5 km	MPC · JPL
756781	2020 OY_{63}	—	October 26, 2009	Mount Lemmon	Mount Lemmon Survey	·	2.3 km	MPC · JPL
756782	2020 OK_{64}	—	May 23, 2014	Haleakala	Pan-STARRS 1	·	1.2 km	MPC · JPL
756783	2020 OC_{80}	—	May 1, 2016	Cerro Tololo	DECam	L4	5.9 km	MPC · JPL
756784	2020 PP_{6}	—	August 22, 2003	Palomar	NEAT	·	1.0 km	MPC · JPL
756785	2020 PG_{7}	—	August 20, 2015	Kitt Peak	Spacewatch	·	1.4 km	MPC · JPL
756786	2020 PF_{8}	—	November 6, 2008	Kitt Peak	Spacewatch	MAR	770 m	MPC · JPL
756787	2020 PU_{16}	—	May 22, 2015	Haleakala	Pan-STARRS 1	·	1.3 km	MPC · JPL
756788	2020 PE_{20}	—	August 11, 2020	Haleakala	Pan-STARRS 1	L4	7.0 km	MPC · JPL
756789	2020 PS_{21}	—	August 13, 2020	Haleakala	Pan-STARRS 1	·	1.1 km	MPC · JPL
756790	2020 PD_{26}	—	April 18, 2015	Cerro Tololo	DECam	L4	7.6 km	MPC · JPL
756791	2020 PN_{30}	—	September 22, 2008	Mount Lemmon	Mount Lemmon Survey	L4	6.9 km	MPC · JPL
756792	2020 PH_{37}	—	December 4, 2012	Kitt Peak	Spacewatch	·	1.0 km	MPC · JPL
756793	2020 PG_{39}	—	June 20, 2015	Haleakala	Pan-STARRS 1	·	1.6 km	MPC · JPL
756794	2020 PK_{39}	—	August 15, 2020	Mount Lemmon	Mount Lemmon Survey	MAR	890 m	MPC · JPL
756795	2020 PL_{39}	—	August 1, 2020	Haleakala	Pan-STARRS 1	·	990 m	MPC · JPL
756796	2020 PC_{44}	—	November 3, 2010	Mount Lemmon	Mount Lemmon Survey	L4	6.2 km	MPC · JPL
756797	2020 PK_{55}	—	November 3, 2010	Mount Lemmon	Mount Lemmon Survey	L4	6.0 km	MPC · JPL
756798	2020 PS_{59}	—	April 19, 2012	Mount Lemmon	Mount Lemmon Survey	·	790 m	MPC · JPL
756799	2020 PW_{73}	—	November 6, 2010	Mount Lemmon	Mount Lemmon Survey	L4	5.6 km	MPC · JPL
756800	2020 QO_{9}	—	September 13, 2007	Catalina	CSS	·	1.4 km	MPC · JPL

== 756801–756900 ==
back to top

Designation			Discovery			Properties		Ref
Permanent	Provisional	Named after	Date	Site	Discoverer(s)	Category	Diam.	Ref
756801	2020 QQ_{9}	—	June 8, 2012	Mount Lemmon	Mount Lemmon Survey	·	960 m	MPC · JPL
756802	2020 QH_{10}	—	August 24, 2020	Palomar	Zwicky Transient Facility	·	1.5 km	MPC · JPL
756803	2020 QY_{10}	—	December 30, 2013	Mount Lemmon	Mount Lemmon Survey	·	910 m	MPC · JPL
756804	2020 QW_{11}	—	July 26, 2020	Mount Lemmon	Mount Lemmon Survey	·	890 m	MPC · JPL
756805	2020 QO_{15}	—	August 18, 2020	Mount Lemmon	Mount Lemmon Survey	·	660 m	MPC · JPL
756806	2020 QS_{15}	—	August 18, 2020	Mount Lemmon	Mount Lemmon Survey	·	920 m	MPC · JPL
756807	2020 QQ_{18}	—	November 8, 2007	Mount Lemmon	Mount Lemmon Survey	·	1.2 km	MPC · JPL
756808	2020 QA_{27}	—	April 14, 2015	Mount Lemmon	Mount Lemmon Survey	L4	7.3 km	MPC · JPL
756809	2020 QT_{27}	—	August 23, 2020	Haleakala	Pan-STARRS 1	·	500 m	MPC · JPL
756810	2020 QJ_{28}	—	August 28, 2020	Mount Lemmon	Mount Lemmon Survey	·	1.0 km	MPC · JPL
756811	2020 QK_{28}	—	August 28, 2020	Mount Lemmon	Mount Lemmon Survey	·	1.6 km	MPC · JPL
756812	2020 QN_{29}	—	November 17, 2006	Kitt Peak	Spacewatch	·	1.5 km	MPC · JPL
756813	2020 QS_{30}	—	August 19, 2020	Haleakala	Pan-STARRS 1	L4	6.6 km	MPC · JPL
756814	2020 QX_{30}	—	August 23, 2020	Haleakala	Pan-STARRS 1	·	1.5 km	MPC · JPL
756815	2020 QT_{43}	—	July 3, 2011	Mount Lemmon	Mount Lemmon Survey	·	1.3 km	MPC · JPL
756816	2020 QW_{47}	—	February 19, 2013	Kitt Peak	Spacewatch	·	1.1 km	MPC · JPL
756817	2020 QU_{48}	—	April 23, 2014	Cerro Tololo	DECam	EUN	890 m	MPC · JPL
756818	2020 QC_{50}	—	August 23, 2020	Haleakala	Pan-STARRS 1	·	590 m	MPC · JPL
756819	2020 QN_{50}	—	April 12, 2016	Haleakala	Pan-STARRS 1	·	520 m	MPC · JPL
756820	2020 QO_{50}	—	May 21, 2015	Cerro Tololo	DECam	·	900 m	MPC · JPL
756821	2020 QZ_{50}	—	August 23, 2020	Haleakala	Pan-STARRS 1	·	1.3 km	MPC · JPL
756822	2020 QA_{87}	—	August 22, 2020	Haleakala	Pan-STARRS 1	HNS	770 m	MPC · JPL
756823	2020 RF_{10}	—	September 15, 2020	Haleakala	Pan-STARRS 1	·	810 m	MPC · JPL
756824	2020 RY_{10}	—	November 30, 2003	Kitt Peak	Spacewatch	·	1.1 km	MPC · JPL
756825	2020 RC_{24}	—	September 9, 2020	Haleakala	Pan-STARRS 1	·	1.2 km	MPC · JPL
756826	2020 RA_{25}	—	September 13, 2020	XuYi	PMO NEO Survey Program	·	690 m	MPC · JPL
756827	2020 RB_{36}	—	December 3, 2010	Mount Lemmon	Mount Lemmon Survey	L4	6.2 km	MPC · JPL
756828	2020 RO_{37}	—	December 18, 2016	Mount Lemmon	Mount Lemmon Survey	·	980 m	MPC · JPL
756829	2020 RW_{39}	—	November 25, 2016	Kitt Peak	Spacewatch	·	1.2 km	MPC · JPL
756830	2020 RH_{43}	—	January 22, 2013	Mount Lemmon	Mount Lemmon Survey	·	1.2 km	MPC · JPL
756831	2020 RX_{48}	—	July 18, 2007	Mount Lemmon	Mount Lemmon Survey	MIS	1.7 km	MPC · JPL
756832 Balogh	2020 RA_{49}	Balogh	October 11, 1999	Mauna Kea	D. D. Balam	·	1.2 km	MPC · JPL
756833	2020 RS_{53}	—	December 30, 2016	Mount Lemmon	Mount Lemmon Survey	·	1.1 km	MPC · JPL
756834	2020 RZ_{113}	—	February 21, 2007	Kitt Peak	Deep Ecliptic Survey	NYS	730 m	MPC · JPL
756835	2020 SA_{13}	—	September 22, 2020	Haleakala	Pan-STARRS 1	·	1.6 km	MPC · JPL
756836	2020 SF_{16}	—	September 14, 2020	Xingming	Sun, P., X. Gao	·	960 m	MPC · JPL
756837	2020 SC_{20}	—	January 20, 2009	Mount Lemmon	Mount Lemmon Survey	·	1.2 km	MPC · JPL
756838	2020 SD_{23}	—	November 30, 2010	Mount Lemmon	Mount Lemmon Survey	·	1.5 km	MPC · JPL
756839	2020 SQ_{24}	—	January 20, 2017	Haleakala	Pan-STARRS 1	·	1.0 km	MPC · JPL
756840	2020 SE_{28}	—	May 31, 2019	Haleakala	Pan-STARRS 1	·	1.6 km	MPC · JPL
756841	2020 SK_{28}	—	April 23, 2014	Cerro Tololo	DECam	·	1.2 km	MPC · JPL
756842	2020 SN_{28}	—	July 24, 2015	Haleakala	Pan-STARRS 1	·	1.2 km	MPC · JPL
756843	2020 SW_{28}	—	December 9, 2016	Mount Lemmon	Mount Lemmon Survey	·	1.4 km	MPC · JPL
756844	2020 SB_{31}	—	June 8, 2019	Haleakala	Pan-STARRS 1	EUN	830 m	MPC · JPL
756845	2020 SF_{37}	—	September 27, 2020	Mount Lemmon	Mount Lemmon Survey	·	1.3 km	MPC · JPL
756846	2020 SO_{60}	—	August 21, 2003	Palomar	NEAT	·	820 m	MPC · JPL
756847	2020 SM_{62}	—	September 28, 2020	Haleakala	Pan-STARRS 1	MAR	790 m	MPC · JPL
756848	2020 SW_{71}	—	January 2, 2016	Mount Lemmon	Mount Lemmon Survey	·	2.0 km	MPC · JPL
756849	2020 SK_{86}	—	September 17, 2020	Mount Lemmon	Mount Lemmon Survey	·	1.8 km	MPC · JPL
756850	2020 SV_{86}	—	August 11, 2015	Haleakala	Pan-STARRS 1	·	1.0 km	MPC · JPL
756851	2020 SL_{87}	—	January 17, 2013	Haleakala	Pan-STARRS 1	·	1.5 km	MPC · JPL
756852	2020 TL_{9}	—	June 27, 2015	Haleakala	Pan-STARRS 1	·	1.3 km	MPC · JPL
756853	2020 TU_{13}	—	October 15, 2007	Kitt Peak	Spacewatch	·	1.1 km	MPC · JPL
756854	2020 TX_{13}	—	October 23, 2003	Kitt Peak	Spacewatch	EUN	770 m	MPC · JPL
756855	2020 TO_{14}	—	October 14, 2020	Mount Lemmon	Mount Lemmon Survey	(5)	910 m	MPC · JPL
756856	2020 TU_{15}	—	February 10, 2008	Kitt Peak	Spacewatch	·	1.5 km	MPC · JPL
756857	2020 TY_{16}	—	October 16, 2015	Kitt Peak	Spacewatch	KOR	1.0 km	MPC · JPL
756858	2020 TT_{18}	—	September 19, 2014	Haleakala	Pan-STARRS 1	·	2.4 km	MPC · JPL
756859	2020 TB_{19}	—	February 20, 2009	Kitt Peak	Spacewatch	·	1.2 km	MPC · JPL
756860	2020 TX_{20}	—	November 15, 2003	Kitt Peak	Spacewatch	EUN	950 m	MPC · JPL
756861	2020 TG_{23}	—	October 15, 2020	Mount Lemmon	Mount Lemmon Survey	AGN	920 m	MPC · JPL
756862	2020 TB_{24}	—	April 23, 2014	Cerro Tololo	DECam	·	1.0 km	MPC · JPL
756863	2020 TR_{24}	—	October 15, 2020	Mount Lemmon	Mount Lemmon Survey	·	1.6 km	MPC · JPL
756864	2020 TH_{25}	—	October 14, 2020	Mount Lemmon	Mount Lemmon Survey	HOF	1.7 km	MPC · JPL
756865	2020 TM_{25}	—	October 14, 2020	Haleakala	Pan-STARRS 2	GEF	1.0 km	MPC · JPL
756866	2020 TZ_{26}	—	October 13, 2020	Mount Lemmon	Mount Lemmon Survey	·	990 m	MPC · JPL
756867	2020 TD_{28}	—	June 29, 2019	Haleakala	Pan-STARRS 1	·	1.2 km	MPC · JPL
756868	2020 TC_{65}	—	January 10, 1999	Kitt Peak	Spacewatch	·	2.9 km	MPC · JPL
756869	2020 TS_{92}	—	October 10, 2020	Haleakala	Pan-STARRS 1	L4	4.3 km	MPC · JPL
756870	2020 UG_{8}	—	November 19, 2008	Mount Lemmon	Mount Lemmon Survey	·	830 m	MPC · JPL
756871	2020 UB_{10}	—	April 29, 2014	Haleakala	Pan-STARRS 1	·	1.6 km	MPC · JPL
756872	2020 UD_{10}	—	October 22, 2020	Haleakala	Pan-STARRS 1	·	870 m	MPC · JPL
756873	2020 UQ_{54}	—	November 8, 2010	Mount Lemmon	Mount Lemmon Survey	L4	5.1 km	MPC · JPL
756874	2020 UO_{55}	—	March 21, 2017	Haleakala	Pan-STARRS 1	HYG	2.3 km	MPC · JPL
756875	2020 UC_{59}	—	February 12, 2008	Mount Lemmon	Mount Lemmon Survey	·	620 m	MPC · JPL
756876	2020 VU_{6}	—	November 14, 2020	Pleasant Groves	Holbrook, M.	APO +1km	900 m	MPC · JPL
756877	2020 VM_{7}	—	November 11, 2020	Mount Lemmon	Mount Lemmon Survey	·	2.0 km	MPC · JPL
756878	2020 WW_{12}	—	January 10, 2013	Haleakala	Pan-STARRS 1	EUN	630 m	MPC · JPL
756879	2020 WX_{18}	—	November 16, 2020	Mount Lemmon	Mount Lemmon Survey	·	670 m	MPC · JPL
756880	2020 XD_{5}	—	December 11, 2020	Haleakala	Pan-STARRS 1	APO · PHA	380 m	MPC · JPL
756881	2020 XG_{12}	—	December 3, 2010	Mount Lemmon	Mount Lemmon Survey	·	610 m	MPC · JPL
756882	2020 YO_{12}	—	December 13, 2015	Haleakala	Pan-STARRS 1	·	2.7 km	MPC · JPL
756883	2020 YY_{12}	—	August 23, 2003	Palomar	NEAT	(5)	1.2 km	MPC · JPL
756884	2020 YA_{14}	—	December 23, 2020	Haleakala	Pan-STARRS 1	·	2.9 km	MPC · JPL
756885	2020 YG_{18}	—	October 17, 2014	Mount Lemmon	Mount Lemmon Survey	·	1.7 km	MPC · JPL
756886	2021 AE_{25}	—	January 13, 2011	Mount Lemmon	Mount Lemmon Survey	·	1.7 km	MPC · JPL
756887	2021 BG_{9}	—	October 3, 2013	Haleakala	Pan-STARRS 1	·	2.5 km	MPC · JPL
756888	2021 BM_{11}	—	March 10, 2011	Mount Lemmon	Mount Lemmon Survey	EOS	1.4 km	MPC · JPL
756889	2021 CF_{11}	—	March 1, 2016	Haleakala	Pan-STARRS 1	EOS	1.6 km	MPC · JPL
756890	2021 CU_{14}	—	August 20, 2009	Kitt Peak	Spacewatch	(13314)	1.7 km	MPC · JPL
756891	2021 CH_{23}	—	March 31, 2016	Cerro Tololo	DECam	·	2.1 km	MPC · JPL
756892	2021 CE_{27}	—	April 1, 2017	Haleakala	Pan-STARRS 1	·	1.5 km	MPC · JPL
756893	2021 CC_{30}	—	November 26, 2013	Haleakala	Pan-STARRS 1	EOS	1.6 km	MPC · JPL
756894	2021 CJ_{41}	—	January 30, 2016	Mount Lemmon	Mount Lemmon Survey	·	1.4 km	MPC · JPL
756895	2021 DJ_{7}	—	January 2, 2009	Kitt Peak	Spacewatch	·	2.7 km	MPC · JPL
756896	2021 EH_{11}	—	September 19, 2003	Kitt Peak	Spacewatch	·	1.6 km	MPC · JPL
756897	2021 EB_{12}	—	March 28, 2016	Cerro Tololo	DECam	·	1.9 km	MPC · JPL
756898	2021 EA_{15}	—	September 13, 2013	Mount Lemmon	Mount Lemmon Survey	·	1.7 km	MPC · JPL
756899	2021 EN_{17}	—	November 9, 2013	Kitt Peak	Spacewatch	EOS	1.5 km	MPC · JPL
756900	2021 EF_{19}	—	December 21, 2008	Mount Lemmon	Mount Lemmon Survey	HYG	2.2 km	MPC · JPL

== 756901–757000 ==
back to top

Designation			Discovery			Properties		Ref
Permanent	Provisional	Named after	Date	Site	Discoverer(s)	Category	Diam.	Ref
756901	2021 EM_{22}	—	March 24, 2015	Haleakala	Pan-STARRS 1	·	2.4 km	MPC · JPL
756902	2021 EH_{27}	—	March 12, 2016	Haleakala	Pan-STARRS 1	·	2.2 km	MPC · JPL
756903	2021 EM_{37}	—	February 14, 2015	Mount Lemmon	Mount Lemmon Survey	VER	2.3 km	MPC · JPL
756904	2021 EB_{39}	—	April 8, 2006	Kitt Peak	Spacewatch	MAS	590 m	MPC · JPL
756905	2021 FW_{4}	—	October 13, 2007	Kitt Peak	Spacewatch	EOS	1.6 km	MPC · JPL
756906	2021 FJ_{5}	—	October 4, 2007	Kitt Peak	Spacewatch	·	2.4 km	MPC · JPL
756907	2021 FE_{7}	—	April 9, 2010	Kitt Peak	Spacewatch	·	2.4 km	MPC · JPL
756908	2021 FU_{8}	—	March 15, 2007	Kitt Peak	Spacewatch	·	1.6 km	MPC · JPL
756909	2021 FS_{9}	—	March 21, 2015	Mount Lemmon	Mount Lemmon Survey	·	2.1 km	MPC · JPL
756910	2021 FQ_{11}	—	September 9, 2013	Haleakala	Pan-STARRS 1	·	1.4 km	MPC · JPL
756911	2021 FF_{20}	—	April 30, 2005	Kitt Peak	Spacewatch	·	750 m	MPC · JPL
756912	2021 FT_{28}	—	February 10, 2016	Haleakala	Pan-STARRS 1	·	1.6 km	MPC · JPL
756913	2021 FL_{33}	—	January 26, 2011	Mount Lemmon	Mount Lemmon Survey	HOF	2.3 km	MPC · JPL
756914	2021 FJ_{36}	—	March 19, 2021	Haleakala	Pan-STARRS 1	T_{j} (2.83)	3.5 km	MPC · JPL
756915	2021 FW_{36}	—	October 11, 2012	Piszkéstető	K. Sárneczky	·	2.5 km	MPC · JPL
756916	2021 FP_{44}	—	September 29, 2005	Mount Lemmon	Mount Lemmon Survey	·	1.2 km	MPC · JPL
756917	2021 GT_{10}	—	January 3, 2016	Haleakala	Pan-STARRS 1	·	1.4 km	MPC · JPL
756918	2021 GZ_{11}	—	March 23, 2015	Haleakala	Pan-STARRS 1	·	2.6 km	MPC · JPL
756919	2021 GS_{19}	—	November 25, 2005	Kitt Peak	Spacewatch	AGN	900 m	MPC · JPL
756920	2021 GB_{26}	—	September 13, 2007	Mount Lemmon	Mount Lemmon Survey	EOS	1.3 km	MPC · JPL
756921	2021 GC_{26}	—	January 29, 2011	Mount Lemmon	Mount Lemmon Survey	·	1.3 km	MPC · JPL
756922	2021 GV_{34}	—	January 20, 2012	Mount Lemmon	Mount Lemmon Survey	·	1.2 km	MPC · JPL
756923	2021 GO_{36}	—	August 26, 2013	Haleakala	Pan-STARRS 1	·	1.0 km	MPC · JPL
756924	2021 GG_{41}	—	September 3, 2013	Mount Lemmon	Mount Lemmon Survey	KOR	960 m	MPC · JPL
756925	2021 GW_{54}	—	July 1, 2013	Haleakala	Pan-STARRS 1	·	1.0 km	MPC · JPL
756926	2021 GF_{70}	—	September 14, 2013	Haleakala	Pan-STARRS 1	·	1.6 km	MPC · JPL
756927	2021 GM_{79}	—	February 3, 2016	Haleakala	Pan-STARRS 1	·	2.5 km	MPC · JPL
756928	2021 GM_{80}	—	March 31, 2013	Mount Lemmon	Mount Lemmon Survey	·	840 m	MPC · JPL
756929	2021 GP_{85}	—	August 4, 2013	Haleakala	Pan-STARRS 1	·	960 m	MPC · JPL
756930	2021 GS_{86}	—	April 10, 2021	Haleakala	Pan-STARRS 1	EOS	1.3 km	MPC · JPL
756931	2021 GE_{99}	—	August 22, 2004	Kitt Peak	Spacewatch	·	590 m	MPC · JPL
756932	2021 GD_{105}	—	August 18, 2018	Haleakala	Pan-STARRS 1	·	1.5 km	MPC · JPL
756933	2021 GL_{106}	—	August 24, 2017	Haleakala	Pan-STARRS 1	·	2.3 km	MPC · JPL
756934	2021 GQ_{111}	—	January 28, 2015	Haleakala	Pan-STARRS 1	EOS	1.5 km	MPC · JPL
756935	2021 GM_{122}	—	April 6, 2021	Haleakala	Pan-STARRS 1	L5	5.6 km	MPC · JPL
756936	2021 GL_{132}	—	March 6, 2016	Haleakala	Pan-STARRS 1	·	1.6 km	MPC · JPL
756937	2021 GG_{160}	—	August 14, 2013	Haleakala	Pan-STARRS 1	·	1.6 km	MPC · JPL
756938	2021 GP_{166}	—	January 16, 2018	Haleakala	Pan-STARRS 1	L5	7.0 km	MPC · JPL
756939	2021 HH_{6}	—	April 16, 2021	Haleakala	Pan-STARRS 1	L5	6.4 km	MPC · JPL
756940	2021 HU_{8}	—	March 11, 2016	Mount Lemmon	Mount Lemmon Survey	·	1.2 km	MPC · JPL
756941	2021 HF_{20}	—	July 16, 2013	Haleakala	Pan-STARRS 1	·	1.1 km	MPC · JPL
756942	2021 JB_{8}	—	December 1, 2006	Mount Lemmon	Mount Lemmon Survey	·	1.1 km	MPC · JPL
756943	2021 JA_{12}	—	September 21, 2017	Haleakala	Pan-STARRS 1	EOS	1.3 km	MPC · JPL
756944	2021 JZ_{12}	—	March 1, 2016	Haleakala	Pan-STARRS 1	LEO	980 m	MPC · JPL
756945	2021 JR_{21}	—	January 4, 2016	Haleakala	Pan-STARRS 1	·	1.0 km	MPC · JPL
756946	2021 JU_{22}	—	October 10, 2012	Mount Lemmon	Mount Lemmon Survey	EOS	1.5 km	MPC · JPL
756947	2021 JG_{33}	—	November 13, 2012	Mount Lemmon	Mount Lemmon Survey	·	1.4 km	MPC · JPL
756948	2021 KZ_{3}	—	May 22, 2021	Mount Lemmon	Mount Lemmon Survey	BRG	1.3 km	MPC · JPL
756949	2021 KO_{12}	—	October 23, 2017	Mount Lemmon	Mount Lemmon Survey	·	2.3 km	MPC · JPL
756950	2021 LR_{4}	—	April 21, 2020	Haleakala	Pan-STARRS 1	L5	7.2 km	MPC · JPL
756951	2021 LB_{9}	—	June 6, 2021	Haleakala	Pan-STARRS 1	L5	6.7 km	MPC · JPL
756952	2021 LD_{13}	—	January 28, 2015	Haleakala	Pan-STARRS 1	H	430 m	MPC · JPL
756953	2021 LC_{14}	—	January 15, 2015	Haleakala	Pan-STARRS 1	L5	6.5 km	MPC · JPL
756954	2021 LN_{21}	—	July 25, 2011	Haleakala	Pan-STARRS 1	BRA	1.3 km	MPC · JPL
756955	2021 MG_{1}	—	June 22, 2021	Mount Lemmon	Mount Lemmon Survey	T_{j} (2.89) · APO +1km · PHA	840 m	MPC · JPL
756956	2021 MP_{1}	—	June 16, 2021	WISE	WISE	AMO +1km	1.1 km	MPC · JPL
756957	2021 NF_{1}	—	July 3, 2021	Črni Vrh	Mikuž, B.	AMO	380 m	MPC · JPL
756958	2021 NS_{5}	—	May 1, 2016	Cerro Tololo	DECam	AMO	730 m	MPC · JPL
756959	2021 NT_{27}	—	July 6, 2021	Haleakala	Pan-STARRS 1	·	950 m	MPC · JPL
756960	2021 PY_{86}	—	September 3, 2010	Mount Lemmon	Mount Lemmon Survey	·	2.1 km	MPC · JPL
756961	2021 PR_{152}	—	July 14, 2016	Haleakala	Pan-STARRS 1	·	2.0 km	MPC · JPL
756962	2021 QP_{55}	—	October 19, 2010	Mount Lemmon	Mount Lemmon Survey	·	850 m	MPC · JPL
756963	2021 RB_{100}	—	September 17, 2010	Mount Lemmon	Mount Lemmon Survey	V	460 m	MPC · JPL
756964	2021 RB_{143}	—	October 22, 2005	Kitt Peak	Spacewatch	·	520 m	MPC · JPL
756965	2021 SU_{3}	—	November 19, 2013	Haleakala	Pan-STARRS 1	H	530 m	MPC · JPL
756966	2021 SQ_{5}	—	September 27, 2021	Haleakala	Pan-STARRS 2	·	540 m	MPC · JPL
756967	2021 SQ_{8}	—	September 28, 2021	Haleakala	Pan-STARRS 2	·	2.0 km	MPC · JPL
756968	2021 SO_{60}	—	November 13, 2010	Mount Lemmon	Mount Lemmon Survey	L4	5.3 km	MPC · JPL
756969	2021 TM_{18}	—	October 9, 2008	Mount Lemmon	Mount Lemmon Survey	·	510 m	MPC · JPL
756970	2021 TF_{47}	—	September 27, 2009	Kitt Peak	Spacewatch	L4	6.2 km	MPC · JPL
756971	2021 VF_{50}	—	December 4, 2007	Catalina	CSS	·	620 m	MPC · JPL
756972	2021 XL_{8}	—	January 3, 2013	Mount Lemmon	Mount Lemmon Survey	·	1.9 km	MPC · JPL
756973	2022 BQ_{62}	—	March 5, 2011	Mount Lemmon	Mount Lemmon Survey	THM	1.3 km	MPC · JPL
756974	2022 CJ_{8}	—	February 1, 2022	Mount Lemmon	Mount Lemmon Survey	·	1.6 km	MPC · JPL
756975	2022 DR_{7}	—	February 18, 2008	Mount Lemmon	Mount Lemmon Survey	DOR	1.6 km	MPC · JPL
756976	2022 HH_{5}	—	July 21, 2012	Zelenchukskaya Stn	T. V. Krjačko, Satovski, B.	·	2.3 km	MPC · JPL
756977	2022 JA_{8}	—	February 10, 2016	Haleakala	Pan-STARRS 1	·	1.9 km	MPC · JPL
756978	2022 KR_{12}	—	March 12, 2016	Haleakala	Pan-STARRS 1	·	1.9 km	MPC · JPL
756979	2022 KD_{35}	—	November 22, 2014	Mount Lemmon	Mount Lemmon Survey	KOR	950 m	MPC · JPL
756980	2022 MF_{14}	—	June 23, 2022	Haleakala	Pan-STARRS 2	L5	8.5 km	MPC · JPL
756981	2022 OZ_{6}	—	June 22, 2010	Mount Lemmon	Mount Lemmon Survey	L5	6.6 km	MPC · JPL
756982	2022 OC_{48}	—	July 25, 2022	Haleakala	Pan-STARRS 2	L5	7.6 km	MPC · JPL
756983	2022 OS_{59}	—	August 30, 2011	Haleakala	Pan-STARRS 1	L5	7.3 km	MPC · JPL
756984	2022 QA_{11}	—	July 5, 2016	Haleakala	Pan-STARRS 1	VER	2.1 km	MPC · JPL
756985	2022 RG_{15}	—	July 31, 2016	Haleakala	Pan-STARRS 1	·	1.9 km	MPC · JPL
756986	2022 RO_{63}	—	June 19, 2010	Mount Lemmon	Mount Lemmon Survey	·	2.7 km	MPC · JPL
756987	2023 FS_{30}	—	March 31, 2023	Haleakala	Pan-STARRS 1	·	1.8 km	MPC · JPL
756988	2023 FB_{43}	—	March 11, 2011	Kitt Peak	Spacewatch	·	720 m	MPC · JPL
756989	2023 MK_{2}	—	September 26, 2013	Mount Lemmon	Mount Lemmon Survey	L5	9.6 km	MPC · JPL
756990	2023 MC_{6}	—	December 23, 2014	Mount Lemmon	Mount Lemmon Survey	L5	8.4 km	MPC · JPL
756991	2023 ME_{8}	—	June 17, 2023	Haleakala	Pan-STARRS 1	L5	9.2 km	MPC · JPL
756992	2023 NC_{4}	—	September 18, 2007	Kitt Peak	Spacewatch	THM	2.2 km	MPC · JPL
756993	2023 OT_{14}	—	January 7, 2006	Mount Lemmon	Mount Lemmon Survey	L5	8.3 km	MPC · JPL
756994	2023 PB	—	August 4, 2023	Haleakala	Pan-STARRS 1	APO	580 m	MPC · JPL
756995	2023 QN	—	August 17, 2023	Nauchnyi	G. Borisov	AMO	570 m	MPC · JPL
756996	2023 RK_{63}	—	August 7, 2012	Mayhill-ISON	L. Elenin	NYS	730 m	MPC · JPL
756997	2024 BU_{28}	—	October 30, 2021	Haleakala	Pan-STARRS 2	L4	4.9 km	MPC · JPL
756998	2024 CR_{9}	—	February 15, 2024	Haleakala	Pan-STARRS 1	AMO · PHA	450 m	MPC · JPL
756999	2024 LC_{7}	—	June 10, 2024	Kitt Peak	Bok NEO Survey	·	1.8 km	MPC · JPL
757000	1991 TY_{10}	—	October 11, 1991	Kitt Peak	Spacewatch	·	1.2 km	MPC · JPL

back to top

== Meaning of names ==
As minor planet discoveries are confirmed, they are given a permanent number by the IAU's Minor Planet Center (MPC), and the discoverers can then submit names for them, following the IAU's naming conventions. The list below concerns those minor planets in the specified number-range that have received names, and explains the meanings of those names.

Official naming citations of newly named small Solar System bodies are approved and published in a bulletin by IAU's Working Group for Small Bodies Nomenclature (WGSBN). Before May 2021, citations were published in MPC's Minor Planet Circulars for many decades. Recent citations can also be found on the JPL Small-Body Database (SBDB). Until his death in 2016, German astronomer Lutz D. Schmadel compiled these citations into the Dictionary of Minor Planet Names (DMP) and regularly updated the collection.

Based on Paul Herget's The Names of the Minor Planets, Schmadel also researched the unclear origin of numerous asteroids, most of which had been named prior to World War II. This article incorporates text from this source, which is in the public domain: SBDB New namings may only be added to this list below after official publication as the preannouncement of names is condemned. The WGSBN publishes a comprehensive guideline for the naming rules of non-cometary small Solar System bodies.

Named minor planet	Provisional	This minor planet was named for...	Ref · Catalog
756509 Zoltandeak	2019 OG_{9}	Zoltan Deak, Romanian amateur astronomer.	IAU · 756509
756832 Balogh	2020 RA_{49}	Michael Balogh (born 1972), Canadian Professor of Physics and Astronomy at the University of Waterloo.	IAU · 756832
