= 2201 Oljato =

Asteroid

Discovery
- Discovered by: H. L. Giclas
- Discovery site: Lowell Obs.
- Discovery date: 12 December 1947

Designations
- Named after: Oljato–Monument Valley (Navajo Reservation)
- Alternative designations: 1947 XC · 1979 VU_{2} 1979 XA
- Minor planet category: NEO · PHA · Amor

Orbital characteristics
- Epoch 4 September 2017 (JD 2458000.5)
- Uncertainty parameter 0
- Observation arc: 84.90 yr (31,008 days)
- Earliest precovery date: 3 December 1931
- Aphelion: 3.7257 AU
- Perihelion: 0.6243 AU
- Semi-major axis: 2.1750 AU
- Eccentricity: 0.7130
- Orbital period (sidereal): 3.21 yr (1,172 days)
- Mean anomaly: 255.69°
- Inclination: 2.5224°
- Longitude of ascending node: 74.991°
- Argument of perihelion: 98.264°
- Earth MOID: 0.0031 AU · 1.2 LD

Physical characteristics
- Dimensions: 1.80±0.1 km (IRAS:11); 2.15 km
- Synodic rotation period: 24 h 26 h (Note: Pravec (1995) web: rotation period 26 hours with a brightness amplitude of 0.1 mag. Summary figures for (2201) Oljato at Collaborative Asteroid Lightcurve Link (CALL))
- Geometric albedo: 0.24; 0.4328±0.030 (IRAS:11)
- Spectral type: SMASS = Sq · C · S
- Absolute magnitude (H): 15.00 · 15.25 · 15.50 · 15.50±0.42 · 15.55

2201 Oljato, provisional designation 1947 XC, is a stony and extremely eccentric active asteroid and sizable near-Earth object of the Apollo group, approximately 2 kilometers in diameter. It has an Earth minimum orbit intersection distance of 0.0031 AU (460 thousand km) and is associated with the Beta Taurids daytime meteor shower.

== Discovery ==
Oljato was discovered by American astronomer Henry L. Giclas at the U.S Lowell Observatory in Flagstaff, Arizona, on 12 December 1947. After its discovery, this near-Earth Apollo asteroid became a lost asteroid for 32 years and was recovered under the provisional designation 1979 XA, by the American astronomers Passey and Bus at the Californian Palomar Observatory in 1979.

== Orbit and classification ==
Oljato is a member of the Apollo asteroids, a subgroup of near-Earth asteroids which cross the orbit of Earth. It is also a potentially hazardous object due to its size and its Earth minimum orbit intersection distance (MOID) of 0.0031 AU (460,000 km), which is only about 1.2 lunar distances . It orbits the Sun at a distance of 0.6–3.7 AU once every 3 years and 3 months (1,172 days). Its orbit has an eccentricity of 0.71 and an inclination of 3° with respect to the ecliptic.

It was a target of Hubble search for transition comets, a spectroscopic study involving amateur astronomers and the use of the Hubble Space Telescope. The asteroid belongs to the Taurid Complex (also see Taurids), a group of near-Earth asteroids thought to be extinct cometary nuclei, that are associated with four meteor showers on Earth, due to their disintegration. The Taurid Complex includes several other Apollo asteroids such as 4183 Cuno, 4341 Poseidon, 5143 Heracles, and 5731 Zeus.

=== Close approaches ===
A recent notable close approach to Earth will be on 28 November 2024, passing at a nominal distance of 0.47 AU (70,000,000 km; 44,000,000 mi). Due to the eccentricity of its orbit, Earth is not the only planet it passes. In 2044 it will pass close to Venus (on 24 Apr at 0.08 AU) as well as Earth (on 30 May at 0.129 AU), and in 2046 it will pass Jupiter (on 15 Jan at 1.4 AU). However, although it crosses the orbit of Mars, it will pass Earth, Venus and Jupiter several times before the next notable close approach to Mars, which will not be until 30 July 2127, passing at a nominal distance of 0.0306 AU (4,580,000 km; 2,840,000 mi)

== Physical characteristics ==
Oljato has a rotation period of 26 hours. The stony asteroid is classified as a Sq-subtype in the SMASS taxonomic scheme, with a geometric albedo of 0.24. An alternative and exceptionally high albedo of 0.43 was determined by 11 observations from the Infrared Astronomical Satellite, IRAS.

== Naming ==
This minor planet was named after the Oljato–Monument Valley in Utah, on the Navajo Indian Reservation. The official naming citation was published by the Minor Planet Center on 28 March 1983 (M.P.C. 7782).
