= 4034 Vishnu =

Asteroid member of the Apollo group of asteroids

Discovery
- Discovered by: E. F. Helin
- Discovery site: Palomar Obs.
- Discovery date: 2 August 1986

Designations
- Named after: Vishnu (Hindu deity)
- Alternative designations: 1986 PA
- Minor planet category: Apollo · NEO · PHA

Orbital characteristics
- Epoch 6 January 2010 (JD 2455202.5)
- Uncertainty parameter 0
- Observation arc: 28.93 yr (10,565 days)
- Aphelion: 1.5299 AU
- Perihelion: 0.5891 AU
- Semi-major axis: 1.0595 AU
- Eccentricity: 0.4439
- Orbital period (sidereal): 1.09 yr (398 days)
- Mean anomaly: 62.851°
- Mean motion: 0° 54^{m} 13.32^{s} / day
- Inclination: 11.170°
- Longitude of ascending node: 158.01°
- Argument of perihelion: 296.60°
- Earth MOID: 0.0194 AU · 7.6 LD

Physical characteristics
- Mean diameter: 0.42 km
- Geometric albedo: 0.52
- Spectral type: SMASS = O
- Absolute magnitude (H): 18.4

4034 Vishnu (prov. designation: 1986 PA) is a rare-type asteroid classified as near-Earth object and potentially hazardous asteroid of the Apollo group, approximately 420 meters (1,400 feet) in diameter. It was discovered on 2 August 1986, by American astronomer Eleanor Helin at Palomar Observatory in California, United States. It is named after the Hindu deity Vishnu.

== Naming ==
This minor planet was named for the four-armed god of protection and preservation of good, Vishnu, one of the principal deities of Hinduism. The asteroid's name was proposed by Belgian amateur astronomer and professional meteorologist Jean Meeus. The approved naming citation was published by the Minor Planet Center on 15 July 2011 (M.P.C. 75547).

== Classification and orbit ==
Vishnu orbits the Sun at a distance of 0.6–1.5 AU once every 1 years and 1 month (398 days). Its orbit has an eccentricity of 0.44 and an inclination of 11° with respect to the ecliptic. As no precoveries were taken, and no prior identifications were made, the body's observation arc begins with its official discovery observation at Palomar in 1986.

Vishnu is a potentially hazardous asteroid due to its sufficiently large size and low Earth minimum orbital intersection distance of 0.0194 AU (2,900,000 km), which corresponds to 7.6 lunar distances.

Its highly eccentric orbit crosses the orbits of all inner planets except that of Mercury, which effectively makes it a Venus-crosser, Earth-crosser and Mars-crosser all at once. From 1800 to 2200, Vishnu has made and will make multiple approaches of Venus (71×), Earth (29×), and Mars (7×) within 30 gigameters. It has been observed by radar astronomy (Binzel) and the orbital solution includes non-gravitational forces.

== Physical parameters ==
In the SMASS taxonomy, Vishnu is a rare O-type asteroid, meaning it is similar to the asteroid 3628 Boznemcová, which is the best asteroid match to the spectra of L6 and LL6 ordinary chondrite meteorites. These L and LL chondrites have lower iron metal content, but higher iron oxide content in the silicates.

In the early 2000s, Vishnu has been observed in the thermal-infrared by the Keck telescope on Mauna Kea, Hawaii. The asteroid measures approximately 420 meters in diameter and its surface has a high albedo of 0.520. As of 2017, Vishnu's rotation period and shape remain unknown as no lightcurves have yet been obtained.
