= (159857) 2004 LJ1 =

Asteroid on an eccentric orbit

(159857) 2004 LJ_{1}
Discovery
- Discovered by: LINEAR
- Discovery site: Lincoln Lab's ETS
- Discovery date: 10 June 2004

Designations
- Minor planet category: Apollo · NEO · PHA

Orbital characteristics
- Epoch 4 September 2017 (JD 2458000.5)
- Uncertainty parameter 0
- Observation arc: 22.29 yr (8,141 days)
- Aphelion: 3.6072 AU
- Perihelion: 0.9203 AU
- Semi-major axis: 2.2637 AU
- Eccentricity: 0.5935
- Orbital period (sidereal): 3.41 yr (1,244 days)
- Mean anomaly: 286.61°
- Mean motion: 0° 17^{m} 21.84^{s} / day
- Inclination: 23.140°
- Longitude of ascending node: 235.58°
- Argument of perihelion: 139.97°
- Earth MOID: 0.0168 AU · 6.5 LD

Physical characteristics
- Mean diameter: 2.47 km (calculated); 3.070±1.324 km
- Synodic rotation period: 2.661±0.001 h (Note: Lightcurve plot of (159857) 2004 LJ_{1} from June to July 2014, by B. D. Warner at the CS3–Palmer Divide Station in California (U82). Quality code of 2. Summary figures at the LCDB and CS3 website.); 2.7247±0.0002 h 2.76 h (Note: Torppa (2011) web: Undated observation. Rotation period 2.76 hours with a brightness amplitude of 0.5 mag. Quality Code of 2. Summary figures at the LCDB)
- Geometric albedo: 0.130±0.158; 0.20 (assumed)
- Spectral type: S (assumed)
- Absolute magnitude (H): 15.11±0.94 · 15.4

(159857) 2004 LJ_{1} is an asteroid on an eccentric orbit, classified as near-Earth object and potentially hazardous asteroid of the Apollo group, approximately 3 kilometers in diameter. The asteroid was discovered on 10 June 2004, by astronomers of the LINEAR program at Lincoln Laboratory's Experimental Test Site near Socorro, New Mexico, in the United States. It is one of the largest potentially hazardous asteroids known to exist.

== Orbit and classification ==
2004 LJ_{1} is a member of the dynamical Apollo group, which are Earth-crossing asteroids. Apollo asteroids are the largest subgroup of near-Earth objects.

The body orbits the Sun at a distance of 0.9–3.6 AU once every 3 years and 5 months (1,244 days; semi-major axis of 2.26 AU). Its orbit has an eccentricity of 0.59 and an inclination of 23° with respect to the ecliptic. Its observation arc begins with a precovery from the Digitized Sky Survey taken at the Siding Spring Observatory, Australia, in February 1995, more than 9 years prior to its official discovery observation at Socorro.

=== Close approaches ===
With an absolute magnitude of at least 15.4, 2004 LJ_{1} is one of the brightest and presumably largest known potentially hazardous asteroid (see PHA-list). It has an Earth minimum orbital intersection distance of 0.0168 AU (2,510,000 km), which translates into 6.5 lunar distances (LD). On 16 November 2038, this asteroid will make its closest near-Earth encounter at a nominal distance of 0.0198 AU (7.7 LD). It is also classified as a Mars-crosser, crossing the orbit of the Red Planet at 1.66 AU.

Chronology of close approaches of large near-Earth objects since 1981 ^{(A)}

PHA	Date	Approach distance in lunar distances			Abs. mag (H)	Diameter ^{(C)} (m)	Ref ^{(D)}
PHA	Date	Nominal ^{(B)}	Minimum	Maximum	Abs. mag (H)	Diameter ^{(C)} (m)	Ref ^{(D)}
(143651) 2003 QO104	1981-05-18	2.761	2.760	2.761	16.0	1333–4306	data
2014 LJ21	1989-08-01	7.034	6.843	7.224	16.0	1333–4306	data
4179 Toutatis	1992-12-08	9.399	9.399	9.399	15.30	2440–2450	data
4179 Toutatis	2004-09-29	4.031	4.031	4.031	15.30	2440–2450	data
(159857) 2004 LJ1	2038-11-16	7.719	7.719	7.719	15.4	1746–4394	data
(4953) 1990 MU	2058-06-05	8.986	8.984	8.988	14.1	3199–10329	data
4179 Toutatis	2069-11-05	7.725	7.724	7.725	15.30	2440–2450	data
(52768) 1998 OR2	2079-04-16	4.611	4.611	4.612	15.8	1462–4721	data
(415029) 2011 UL21	2089-06-25	6.936	6.935	6.938	15.7	1531–4944	data
3200 Phaethon	2093-12-14	7.714	7.709	7.718	14.6	4900–5300	data
(52768) 1998 OR2	2127-04-16	6.536	6.510	6.563	15.8	1462–4721	data
^{(A)} This list includes near-Earth approaches of less than 10 lunar distances (LD) of objects with H brighter than 16.^{(B)} Nominal geocentric distance from the center of Earth to the center of the object (Earth has a radius of approximately 6,400 km).^{(C)} Diameter: estimated, theoretical mean-diameter based on H and albedo range between X and Y.^{(D)} Reference: data source from the JPL SBDB, with AU converted into LD (1 AU≈390 LD)^{(E)} Color codes: unobserved at close approach observed during close approach upcoming approaches

== Physical characteristics ==
2004 LJ_{1} is an assumed stony S-type asteroid.

=== Rotation period ===
Three rotational lightcurves of 2004 LJ_{1} have been obtained from photometric observations by Johanna Torppa, Adrián Galád and Brian Warner since 2004. Lightcurve analysis gave a consolidated rotation period of 2.7247 hours with a brightness amplitude between 0.15 and 0.59 magnitude (U=3).

=== Diameter and albedo ===
According to the survey carried out by the NEOWISE mission of NASA's Wide-field Infrared Survey Explorer, 2004 LJ_{1} measures 3.07 kilometers in diameter and its surface has an albedo of 0.13. The Collaborative Asteroid Lightcurve Link assumes a standard albedo for stony asteroids of 0.20 and calculates a diameter of 2.47 kilometers, based on an absolute magnitude of 15.4.

== Numbering and naming ==
This minor planet was numbered by the Minor Planet Center on 30 June 2007. As of 2018, it has not been named.
