= (415029) 2011 UL21 =

Apollo-class asteroid

(415029) 2011 UL_{21}
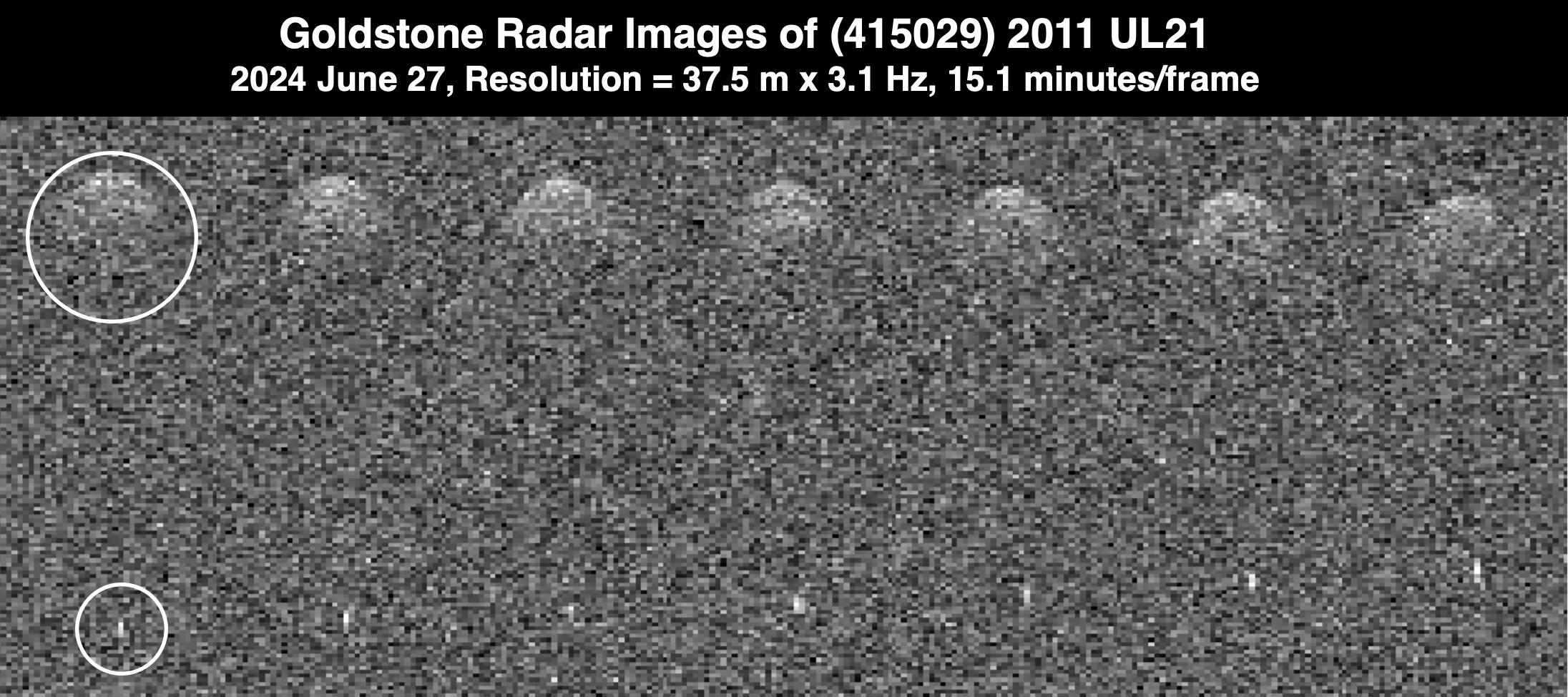

Discovery
- Discovered by: Catalina Sky Srvy.
- Discovery site: Catalina Stn.
- Discovery date: 17 October 2011

Designations
- Minor planet category: Apollo · NEO · PHA

Orbital characteristics
- Epoch 13 January 2016 (JD 2,457,400.5)
- Uncertainty parameter 0
- Observation arc: 9,379 days (25.68 yr)
- Aphelion: 3.5091 AU (524.95 Gm)
- Perihelion: 0.73606 AU (110.113 Gm)
- Semi-major axis: 2.1226 AU (317.54 Gm)
- Eccentricity: 0.65323
- Orbital period (sidereal): 3.09 yr (1129.5 d)
- Mean anomaly: 110.19°
- Mean motion: 0° 19^{m} 7.392^{s} / day
- Inclination: 34.845°
- Longitude of ascending node: 275.60°
- Argument of perihelion: 284.74°
- Known satellites: 1 moonlet discovered
- Earth MOID: 0.0185982 AU (2.78225 Gm)

Physical characteristics
- Mean diameter: 2.5 km
- Mass: 2.1×10^{13} kg (assumed)
- Absolute magnitude (H): 15.8

(415029) 2011 UL_{21} is an Apollo-class potentially hazardous asteroid discovered on 17 October 2011, by the Catalina Sky Survey project. The asteroid is estimated to have a diameter of 2.5 kilometres (1.6 mi). It was rated at Torino scale 1 on 27 October 2011, with an observation arc of 9.6 days. 2011 UL_{21} is the largest asteroid ever to be rated above a 0 on the Torino scale.

== Description ==
2011 UL_{21} briefly had about a 1 in a million chance of impacting in 2029. Its cumulative impact probability dropped to 1 in 71 million by 2 November 2011 when the observation arc reached 15 days. It was removed from the Sentry risk table on 4 November 2011 when all impact scenarios for the next 100 years or more were ruled out. During 2029, the closest approach to Earth is 1.6 AU. Palomar Observatory precovery images from 1989 and 1990 have extended the observation arc to 22 years.

With an absolute magnitude of 15.8, it is one of the brightest and therefore largest potentially hazardous asteroids (PHA) detected since (242450) 2004 QY2. The next largest PHA (based on absolute magnitude) discovered in 2011 is 2011 WO_{41} with an absolute magnitude of 16.8.

On 27 June 2024 it had a relatively close fly-by with the Earth, reaching a minimum distance of 0.044 AU (6.6 million km; 4.1 million mi) from it. It was revealed to be orbited by a moonlet.

Chronology of close approaches of large near-Earth objects since 1981 ^{(A)}

PHA	Date	Approach distance in lunar distances			Abs. mag (H)	Diameter ^{(C)} (m)	Ref ^{(D)}
PHA	Date	Nominal ^{(B)}	Minimum	Maximum	Abs. mag (H)	Diameter ^{(C)} (m)	Ref ^{(D)}
(143651) 2003 QO104	1981-05-18	2.761	2.760	2.761	16.0	1333–4306	data
2014 LJ21	1989-08-01	7.034	6.843	7.224	16.0	1333–4306	data
4179 Toutatis	1992-12-08	9.399	9.399	9.399	15.30	2440–2450	data
4179 Toutatis	2004-09-29	4.031	4.031	4.031	15.30	2440–2450	data
(159857) 2004 LJ1	2038-11-16	7.719	7.719	7.719	15.4	1746–4394	data
(4953) 1990 MU	2058-06-05	8.986	8.984	8.988	14.1	3199–10329	data
4179 Toutatis	2069-11-05	7.725	7.724	7.725	15.30	2440–2450	data
(52768) 1998 OR2	2079-04-16	4.611	4.611	4.612	15.8	1462–4721	data
(415029) 2011 UL21	2089-06-25	6.936	6.935	6.938	15.7	1531–4944	data
3200 Phaethon	2093-12-14	7.714	7.709	7.718	14.6	4900–5300	data
(52768) 1998 OR2	2127-04-16	6.536	6.510	6.563	15.8	1462–4721	data
^{(A)} This list includes near-Earth approaches of less than 10 lunar distances (LD) of objects with H brighter than 16.^{(B)} Nominal geocentric distance from the center of Earth to the center of the object (Earth has a radius of approximately 6,400 km).^{(C)} Diameter: estimated, theoretical mean-diameter based on H and albedo range between X and Y.^{(D)} Reference: data source from the JPL SBDB, with AU converted into LD (1 AU≈390 LD)^{(E)} Color codes: unobserved at close approach observed during close approach upcoming approaches

== See also ==
- 2024 MK – a near-Earth object that made a close approach on 29 June 2024
