= 4341 Poseidon =

Near-Earth asteroid

Discovery
- Discovered by: C. Shoemaker
- Discovery site: Palomar Obs.
- Discovery date: 29 May 1987

Designations
- Named after: Poseidon (Greek mythology)
- Alternative designations: 1987 KF
- Minor planet category: Apollo · NEO

Orbital characteristics
- Epoch 4 September 2017 (JD 2458000.5)
- Uncertainty parameter 0
- Observation arc: 30.05 yr (10,975 days)
- Aphelion: 3.0819 AU
- Perihelion: 0.5881 AU
- Semi-major axis: 1.8350 AU
- Eccentricity: 0.6795
- Orbital period (sidereal): 2.49 yr (908 days)
- Mean anomaly: 93.192°
- Mean motion: 0° 23^{m} 47.4^{s} / day
- Inclination: 11.852°
- Longitude of ascending node: 108.11°
- Argument of perihelion: 15.652°
- Earth MOID: 0.1941 AU · 75.6 LD

Physical characteristics
- Mean diameter: 2.32 km (derived)
- Synodic rotation period: 6.262 h 6.2656 h
- Geometric albedo: 0.18 (assumed)
- Spectral type: SMASS = O
- Absolute magnitude (H): 15.65 · 16.0 · 16.11±0.80

4341 Poseidon (prov. designation: 1987 KF) is a rare-type asteroid classified as near-Earth object of the Apollo group, approximately 2.3 kilometers (1.4 miles) in diameter. It was discovered by American astronomer Carolyn Shoemaker at Palomar Observatory on 29 May 1987. The asteroid was named after Poseidon from Greek mythology.

== Orbit and classification ==
Poseidon orbits the Sun at a distance of 0.6–3.1 AU once every 2 years and 6 months (908 days). Its orbit has an eccentricity of 0.68 and an inclination of 12° with respect to the ecliptic.

As no precoveries were taken, the asteroid's observation arc begins with its discovery in 1987. Poseidon may be associated with the Taurid Complex of meteor showers. It has an Earth minimum orbital intersection distance of 0.1941 AU (29,000,000 km), which corresponds to 75.6 lunar distances.

== Naming ==
This minor planet was named for the "God of the Sea", Poseidon, one of the Twelve Olympians in Greek mythology. He was also referred to as "Earth-Shaker" due to his role in provoking earthquakes, which were then thought to be caused by ocean waves beating on the shore. He was the brother of Zeus (see 5731 Zeus), and an enemy of the Trojans in the Trojan War. The naming citation was published by the Minor Planet Center on 30 January 1991 (M.P.C. 17656).

== Physical characteristics ==
In the SMASS classification, Poseidon is an O-type asteroid.

=== Diameter and albedo ===
The Collaborative Asteroid Lightcurve Link assumes an albedo of 0.18 and derives a diameter of 2.32 kilometers with an absolute magnitude of 15.65. As of 2017, no other estimates for its diameter and albedo have been published.

=== Lightcurves ===
In 1998, a rotational lightcurve of Poseidon was published from photometric observations made by Czech astronomer Petr Pravec at Ondřejov Observatory. It gave a period of 6.262 hours with a brightness variation of 0.08 magnitude (U=2).

A second lightcurve was obtained during the Near-Earth Objects Follow-up Program which gave a concurring period of 6.2656 hours and an amplitude of 0.07 magnitude (U=2). A low brightness variation typically indicates that the body has a nearly spheroidal shape.
