= 12923 Zephyr =

Stony asteroid

Discovery
- Discovered by: LONEOS
- Discovery site: Anderson Mesa Stn.
- Discovery date: 11 April 1999

Designations
- Pronunciation: /ˈzɛfər/
- Named after: Zephyrus (Greek mythology)
- Alternative designations: 1999 GK_{4}
- Minor planet category: NEO; Apollo; PHA

Orbital characteristics
- Epoch 4 September 2017 (JD 2458000.5)
- Uncertainty parameter 0
- Observation arc: 61.75 yr (22,554 days)
- Earliest precovery date: 21 April 1955
- Aphelion: 2.9267 AU
- Perihelion: 0.9964 AU
- Semi-major axis: 1.9615 AU
- Eccentricity: 0.4920
- Orbital period (sidereal): 2.75 yr (1,003 days)
- Mean anomaly: 199.23°
- Mean motion: 0° 21^{m} 31.68^{s} / day
- Inclination: 5.3045°
- Longitude of ascending node: 168.21°
- Argument of perihelion: 147.06°
- Earth MOID: 0.0211 AU (8.2 LD)

Physical characteristics
- Mean diameter: 1.86±0.46 km; 2.060±0.013 km; 2.062 km
- Synodic rotation period: 3.891 h (Note: Pravec (1999) web: rotation period 3.891 hours with a brightness amplitude of 0.18 mag. Summary figures for (12923) Zephyr at LCDB and Ondrejov Asteroid Photometry Project (data sheet))
- Geometric albedo: 0.1764; 0.199±0.034; 0.20±0.16; 0.21±0.17
- Spectral type: SMASS = S: S
- Absolute magnitude (H): 15.40±0.1 (R); 15.77±0.24; 15.8; 15.93±0.078

12923 Zephyr (prov. designation: 1999 GK_{4}) is a stony asteroid, classified as potentially hazardous asteroid and near-Earth object of the Apollo group, approximately 2 kilometers (1.2 miles) in diameter. It was discovered on 11 April 1999, by astronomers of the Lowell Observatory Near-Earth Object Search at Anderson Mesa Station near Flagstaff, Arizona. The asteroid was named after the deity Zephyrus from Greek mythology.

== Orbit and classification ==
Zephyr orbits the Sun at a distance of 1.0–2.9 AU once every 2 years and 9 months (1,003 days). Its orbit has an eccentricity of 0.49 and an inclination of 5° with respect to the ecliptic. The body's observation arc begins with a precovery taken at Palomar Observatory in April 1955, almost 44 years prior to its official discovery observation at Anderson Mesa.

=== Close encounters ===
This near-Earth asteroid has an Earth minimum orbital intersection distance of 0.0211 AU (3,160,000 km), which corresponds to 8.2 lunar distances. This short distance as well as its sufficiently large size makes it a potentially hazardous asteroid. In September 2010, the asteroid approached Earth at 0.2546 AU (38,100,000 km); it will make close encounters with Earth again in 2021, 2032 and 2043.

== Naming ==
This minor planet was named after the god of the west wind, Zephyrus, from Greek mythology. The name was suggested by M. Smitherman. The official naming citation was published by the Minor Planet Center on 28 September 2004 (M.P.C. 52768).

== Physical characteristics ==
In the SMASS classification, Zephyr is a common S-type asteroid. The body is also characterized as a stony asteroid by the Infrared Telescope Facility, and in the Tholen classification (noisy spectrum).

=== Rotation period ===
In April 1999, a rotational lightcurve of Zephyr was obtained from photometric observations by Czech astronomer Petr Pravec at Ondřejov Observatory. Lightcurve analysis gave a well-defined rotation period of 3.891 hours with a brightness amplitude of 0.18 magnitude (U=3).

=== Diameter and albedo ===
According to the survey carried out by the NEOWISE mission of NASA's Wide-field Infrared Survey Explorer and the ExploreNEOs survey of the Spitzer Space Telescope, Zephyr measures between 1.86 and 2.062 kilometers in diameter and its surface has an albedo between 0.1764 and 0.21.

The Collaborative Asteroid Lightcurve Link adopts Petr Pravec's revised WISE data, with albedo of 0.1764 and a diameter of 2.06 kilometers based on an absolute magnitude of 15.93.
