= 5143 Heracles =

Highly eccentric, rare-type asteroid and synchronous binary system

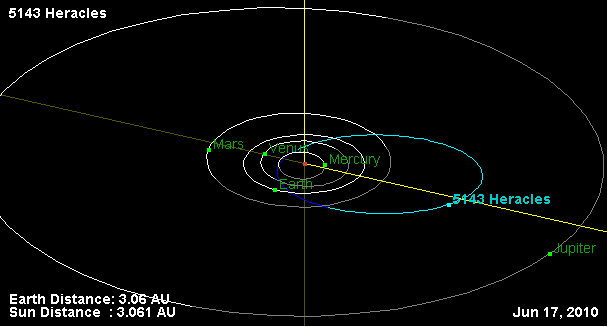
- Orbit of 5143 Heracles

Discovery
- Discovered by: C. Shoemaker
- Discovery site: Palomar Obs.
- Discovery date: 7 November 1991

Designations
- Pronunciation: /ˈhɛrəkliːz/
- Named after: Ἡρακλῆς Hēraklēs (Greek mythology)
- Alternative designations: 1991 VL · 1962 PG
- Minor planet category: Apollo · NEO
- Adjectives: Heraclean /hɛrəˈkliːən/

Orbital characteristics
- Epoch 4 September 2017 (JD 2458000.5)
- Uncertainty parameter 0
- Observation arc: 63.58 yr (23,224 days)
- Earliest precovery date: 30 November 1953
- Aphelion: 3.2494 AU
- Perihelion: 0.4174 AU
- Semi-major axis: 1.8334 AU
- Eccentricity: 0.7723
- Orbital period (sidereal): 2.48 yr (907 days)
- Mean anomaly: 93.744°
- Mean motion: 0° 23^{m} 49.2^{s} / day
- Inclination: 9.0330°
- Longitude of ascending node: 309.52°
- Argument of perihelion: 227.77°
- Known satellites: 1 (0.6±0.3 km; orb. 17 h)
- Earth MOID: 0.0584 AU · 22.8 LD

Physical characteristics
- Dimensions: 3.26 km 3.28±0.09 km 3.41 km 4.5±0.7 km 4.83 km (taken); 4.833 km 4.843±0.378 km
- Synodic rotation period: 2.704±0.002 h (Note: Warner (2017c): lightcurve plot of (5143) Heracles, with a rotation period 2.704±0.002 hours and a brightness amplitude of 0.15 mag (Quality Code of 2; 133 points). Observations from 12 to 17 September 2016, at CS3-Palmer Divide Station. Summary figures at Collaborative Asteroid Lightcurve Link (CALL)); 2.7060±0.0002 h 2.706±0.001 h 2.7063 h 2.7065±0.0005 h 3.0149±0.0002 h 5.990±0.0111 h
- Geometric albedo: 0.1481; 0.20±0.05; 0.227±0.054; 0.38; 0.40±0.22; 0.412±0.030; 0.42
- Spectral type: SMASS = O Q · C · O V–R = 0.420±0.070
- Absolute magnitude (H): 13.786±0.004 (R) · 13.8 · 14.0 · 14.10±0.04 · 14.27 · 14.27±0.09 · 14.52±0.02 (R)

5143 Heracles (provisional designation 1991 VL) is a highly eccentric, rare-type asteroid and synchronous binary system, classified as a near-Earth object of the Apollo group, approximately 4.8 kilometers in diameter. The asteroid was discovered on 7 November 1991, by American astronomer Carolyn Shoemaker at Palomar Observatory in California, United States. It is named for the Greek divine hero Heracles. It has an Earth minimum orbit intersection distance of 0.058 AU (8.7 million km) and is associated with the Beta Taurids daytime meteor shower.

== Classification and orbit ==
Heracles orbits the Sun in the inner main-belt at a distance of 0.4–3.2 AU once every 2 years and 6 months (907 days). Its orbit has an eccentricity of 0.77 and an inclination of 9° with respect to the ecliptic. The first precovery was taken at Palomar during the Digitized Sky Survey in 1953, extending the body's observation arc by 38 years prior to its official discovery observation.

Due to its high eccentricity, Heracles is also a Mercury-grazer and a Mars-crosser. It has a minimum orbital intersection distance with Earth of 0.0584 AU (8,740,000 km) which corresponds to 22.8 lunar distances.

== Physical characteristics ==
=== Spectral type ===
In the SMASS taxonomy, Heracles is a rare O-type asteroid, which have spectra similar to those of stony chondritic meteorites of the L6 and LL6 type. However, it has also been characterized as a carbonaceous C-type, as well as a stony Sk and Q-type asteroid.

=== Lightcurves ===
A large number of rotational lightcurves of Heracles were obtained from photometric observations between 2006 and 2016. Lightcurve data gives a rotation period between 2.7051 and 2.7065 hours with a brightness variation of 0.05 to 0.20 magnitude (U=3/3/3/3/3-).

=== Diameters ===
According to the surveys carried out by the Spitzer Space Telescope, the Japanese Akari satellite, and NASA's Wide-field Infrared Survey Explorer with its subsequent NEOWISE mission, the asteroid measures between 3.26 and 4.843 kilometers in diameter, and its surface has an albedo between 0.20 and 0.24. The Collaborative Asteroid Lightcurve Link adopts the results from Petr Pravec's revised WISE data, that is, an albedo of 0.1481 and a diameter of 4.83 kilometers with an absolute magnitude of 14.27.

== Binary system ==
On 12 July 2012, it was announced that Heracles is an assumed synchronous binary asteroid with a minor-planet moon orbiting its primary in a retrograde motion approximately every 16 hours. The companion was discovered in December 2011, by a team of astronomers using radar observations from Arecibo Observatory in Puerto Rico, following months of intensive photometric lightcurve observations (see above).

A longer orbital period of 40–57 hours cannot be excluded, which would then no longer be a synchronous system. Estimated diameters for Heracles and its moon are 3.6±1.2 and 0.6±0.3 kilometer, respectively.

Follow-up observations in 2016 confirmed an orbital period of 17 hours for the asteroid moon.

== Naming ==
This minor planet was named after Heracles, the divine gatekeeper of Mount Olympus and one of the greatest heroes in Greek mythology, known for his strength and his Twelve Labors. Heracles is the son of Zeus and Alcmena, after whom the asteroids 5731 Zeus and 82 Alkmene were named. In the Roman adaptation, Heracles is known as Hercules. The approved naming citation was published by the Minor Planet Center on 14 July 1992 (M.P.C. 20523).
