= (111253) 2001 XU10 =

Asteroid

(111253) 2001 XU_{10}
Discovery
- Discovered by: LINEAR
- Discovery site: Lincoln Lab's ETS
- Discovery date: 9 December 2001

Designations
- Minor planet category: Apollo · NEO · PHA

Orbital characteristics
- Epoch 4 September 2017 (JD 2458000.5)
- Uncertainty parameter 0
- Observation arc: 17.94 yr (6,552 days)
- Aphelion: 2.5242 AU
- Perihelion: 0.9832 AU
- Semi-major axis: 1.7537 AU
- Eccentricity: 0.4394
- Orbital period (sidereal): 2.32 yr (848 days)
- Mean anomaly: 38.733°
- Mean motion: 0° 25^{m} 27.84^{s} / day
- Inclination: 42.020°
- Longitude of ascending node: 310.17°
- Argument of perihelion: 6.9341°
- Earth MOID: 0.0293 AU · 11.4 LD

Physical characteristics
- Dimensions: 3.006±0.893 km
- Geometric albedo: 0.178±0.156
- Absolute magnitude (H): 15.2

(111253) 2001 XU_{10} is an asteroid on an eccentric orbit, classified as near-Earth object and potentially hazardous asteroid of the Apollo group, approximately 3 kilometers in diameter. It was discovered on 9 December 2001, by astronomers of the LINEAR program at Lincoln Laboratory's Experimental Test Site near Socorro, New Mexico, in the United States. The asteroid is one of the largest potentially hazardous asteroids.

== Orbit and classification ==
2001 XU_{10} orbits the Sun at a distance of 0.98–2.52 AU once every 2 years and 4 months (848 days; semi-major axis of 1.75 AU). Its orbit has an eccentricity of 0.44 and an inclination of 42° with respect to the ecliptic. The body's observation arc begins with a precovery taken by the Sloan Digital Sky Survey in February 2000.

2001 XU_{10} is a member of the Apollo asteroids, the largest subgroup of near-Earth asteroids which cross the orbit of Earth. It is also a Mars-crosser, as it crosses the orbit of the Red Planet at 1.66 AU.

=== Close approaches ===
With an absolute magnitude of 15.2, 2001 XU_{10} is one of the brightest and presumably largest known potentially hazardous asteroid. It has an Earth minimum orbital intersection distance of 0.0293 AU (4,380,000 km), which translates into 11.4 lunar distances (LD). On 29 July 2054, this asteroid will make its closest near-Earth encounter of the 21st century at a nominal distance of 0.079 AU (31.1 LD).

== Physical characteristics ==
According to the survey carried out by the NEOWISE mission of NASA's Wide-field Infrared Survey Explorer, 2001 XU_{10} measures 3.006 kilometers in diameter and its surface has an albedo of 0.178.

As of 2018, no rotational lightcurve of 2001 XU_{10} has been obtained from photometric observations. The asteroid's rotation period, spin axis and shape remain unknown. In addition, the body's spectral type has never been assessed.

== Numbering and naming ==
This minor planet was numbered by the Minor Planet Center on 19 October 2005. As of 2018, it has not been named.
