= (89830) 2002 CE =

Near-Earth asteroid

Discovery
- Discovered by: LINEAR
- Discovery site: Lincoln Lab's ETS
- Discovery date: 1 February 2002

Designations
- Minor planet category: Amor · NEO · PHA

Orbital characteristics
- Epoch 4 September 2017 (JD 2458000.5)
- Uncertainty parameter 0
- Observation arc: 34.91 yr (12,752 days)
- Aphelion: 3.1314 AU
- Perihelion: 1.0234 AU
- Semi-major axis: 2.0774 AU
- Eccentricity: 0.5074
- Orbital period (sidereal): 2.99 yr (1,094 days)
- Mean anomaly: 117.79°
- Mean motion: 0° 19^{m} 45.12^{s} / day
- Inclination: 43.701°
- Longitude of ascending node: 19.934°
- Argument of perihelion: 5.7062°
- Earth MOID: 0.0277 AU · 10.8 LD

Physical characteristics
- Mean diameter: 3.11 km (calculated); 5.067±2.155 km
- Synodic rotation period: 2.6149±0.0008 h (Note: Pravec (2004) web: rotation period 2.6149±0.0008 hours with a brightness amplitude of 0.09 mag. Summary figures for (89830) 2002 CE at the LCEB and Pravec, P.; Wolf, M.; Sarounova, L. (2004). Quality Code of 2−. Observation period: 11–23 October 2004. Observer's comment (Pravec): several longer periods are also possible (see Ondrejov data))
- Geometric albedo: 0.079±0.075; 0.20 (assumed)
- Spectral type: S
- Absolute magnitude (H): 14.80±0.3 · 14.9 · 15.67±0.27

(89830) 2002 CE is a stony asteroid, classified as a near-Earth object and potentially hazardous asteroid of the Amor group, approximately 3.1 kilometers in diameter. It was discovered on 1 February 2002, by astronomers of the LINEAR program at Lincoln Laboratory's Experimental Test Site near Socorro, New Mexico, in the United States. This asteroid is one of the largest potentially hazardous asteroid known to exist.

== Orbit and classification ==
2002 CE is a member of the dynamical Amor group, which are Mars-crossing asteroids that approach the orbit of Earth from beyond, but do not cross it.

It orbits the Sun at a distance of 1.0–3.1 AU once every 2 years and 12 months (1,094 days; semi-major axis of 2.08 AU). Its orbit has a high eccentricity of 0.51 and an inclination of 44° with respect to the ecliptic.

The body's observation arc begins with a precovery from the Digitized Sky Survey taken at the Siding Spring Observatory, Australia, in May 1982, nearly 20 years prior to its official discovery observation at Socorro.

=== Close approaches ===
With an absolute magnitude of 14.9, 2002 CE is one of the brightest and largest known potentially hazardous asteroid (see PHA-list). It has an Earth minimum orbital intersection distance of 0.0277 AU (4,140,000 km), which corresponds to 10.8 lunar distances.

== Physical characteristics ==
2002 CE has been characterized as a common, stony S-type asteroid by astronomers conducting spectroscopic observations using the New Technology Telescope at La Silla, Chile, and the 2.2-meter telescope of the Calar Alto Observatory in Spain.

=== Rotation period ===
In October 2004, a rotational lightcurve of 2002 CE was obtained from photometric observations by Czech astronomer Petr Pravec at the Ondřejov Observatory. Lightcurve analysis gave a rotation period of 2.6149 hours with a low brightness amplitude of 0.09 magnitude (U=2-). Several longer periods are also possible.

=== Diameter and albedo ===
According to the survey carried out by the NEOWISE mission of NASA's Wide-field Infrared Survey Explorer, 2002 CE measures 5.067 kilometers in diameter and its surface has a low albedo of 0.079. Conversely, the Collaborative Asteroid Lightcurve Link assumes a stony standard albedo of 0.20 and calculates a smaller diameter of 3.11 kilometers based on an absolute magnitude of 14.9.

== Numbering and naming ==
This minor planet was numbered by the Minor Planet Center on 30 August 2004. As of 2018, it has not been named.
