= (8201) 1994 AH2 =

Near-Earth asteroid

(8201) 1994 AH_{2}
Discovery
- Discovered by: G. J. Garradd
- Discovery site: Siding Spring Obs.
- Discovery date: 5 January 1994

Designations
- Minor planet category: Apollo · NEO; Alinda group

Orbital characteristics
- Epoch 4 September 2017 (JD 2458000.5)
- Uncertainty parameter 0
- Observation arc: 34.86 yr (12,731 days)
- Aphelion: 4.3322 AU
- Perihelion: 0.7436 AU
- Semi-major axis: 2.5379 AU
- Eccentricity: 0.7070
- Orbital period (sidereal): 4.04 yr (1,477 days)
- Mean anomaly: 285.46°
- Mean motion: 0° 14^{m} 37.68^{s} / day
- Inclination: 9.5538°
- Longitude of ascending node: 164.12°
- Argument of perihelion: 25.120°
- Earth MOID: 0.1012 AU · 39.4 LD
- Jupiter MOID: 0.6611 AU

Physical characteristics
- Dimensions: 1.859±0.183 km 2.17 km (calculated); 2.2 km
- Synodic rotation period: 23.949 h 24 h (Note: Pravec (1998) web: Observation from 15 July 1998. Rotation period 24 hours with a brightness amplitude of 0.3 mag. No quality rating available. Summary figures at Collaborative Asteroid Lightcurve Link (CALL) for (8201) and Pravec, P.; Wolf, M.; Sarounova, L. (1998))
- Geometric albedo: 0.15 (estimated); 0.154±0.042; 0.18 (assumed)
- Spectral type: SMASS=O · O
- Absolute magnitude (H): 15.8 · 16.3

(8201) 1994 AH_{2} is a highly eccentric, rare-type asteroid, classified as a near-Earth object of the Apollo group of asteroids, approximately 2 kilometers in diameter. It was discovered on 5 January 1994, by Australian amateur astronomer Gordon Garradd during the AANEAS survey at the Siding Spring Observatory, Australia. It has an Earth minimum orbit intersection distance of 0.1 AU (15 million km) and is associated with the Beta Taurids daytime meteor shower.

== Orbit and classification ==
The asteroid orbits the Sun at a distance of 0.7–4.3 AU once every 4.04 years (1,477 days). Its orbit has an eccentricity of 0.71 and an inclination of 10° with respect to the ecliptic. It is a member of the Alinda group of asteroids with a 3:1 resonance with Jupiter that has excited the eccentricity of the orbit over the eons. As an Alinda asteroid it makes approaches to Jupiter, Earth, and Venus.

1994 AH_{2} has an Earth minimum orbital intersection distance of 0.1012 AU (15,100,000 km), which corresponds to 39.4 lunar distances. Due to its elongated orbit, it also approaches the orbit of Jupiter within 0.1022 AU (15,300,000 km). On 4 January 2079, it will pass 0.3595 AU (53,800,000 km) from the Earth.

A first precovery was taken at the discovering observatory in 1981, extending the asteroid's observation arc by 13 years prior to its discovery.

== Physical characteristics ==
In the SMASS classification, 1994 AH_{2} is characterized as a rare O-type asteroid.

=== Rotation period ===
In the late 1990s, Czech astronomer Petr Pravec obtained two rotational lightcurves for this asteroid from photometric observations taken at the Ondřejov Observatory, Czech Republic. They gave a longer-than average rotation period of 23.949 and 24 hours with a brightness variation of 0.27 and 0.3 magnitude, respectively (U=2/n.a.).

=== Diameter and albedo ===
According to the survey carried out by the NEOWISE mission of NASA's Wide-field Infrared Survey Explorer, the asteroid measures 1.86 kilometers in diameter and its surface has an albedo of 0.154. The Collaborative Asteroid Lightcurve Link assumes an albedo of 0.18 and calculates a diameter of 2.17 kilometers, based on an absolute magnitude of 15.8. American astronomer Richard Binzel gives a diameter of 2.2 kilometers.

== Naming ==
As of 2017, 1994 AH_{2} remains unnamed.
