= (90075) 2002 VU94 =

Asteroid on an eccentric orbit

(90075) 2002 VU_{94}
Discovery
- Discovered by: NEAT
- Discovery site: Palomar Obs.
- Discovery date: 13 November 2002

Designations
- Minor planet category: Apollo · NEO · PHA

Orbital characteristics
- Epoch 4 September 2017 (JD 2458000.5)
- Uncertainty parameter 0
- Observation arc: 62.16 yr (22,704 days)
- Aphelion: 3.3631 AU
- Perihelion: 0.9045 AU
- Semi-major axis: 2.1338 AU
- Eccentricity: 0.5761
- Orbital period (sidereal): 3.12 yr (1,138 days)
- Mean anomaly: 26.512°
- Mean motion: 0° 18^{m} 58.32^{s} / day
- Inclination: 8.9155°
- Longitude of ascending node: 226.78°
- Argument of perihelion: 30.617°
- Earth MOID: 0.0301 AU · 11.7 LD

Physical characteristics
- Dimensions: 2.233±0.084 km 2.59 km (calculated)
- Synodic rotation period: 7.878±0.002 h 7.879±0.002 h (Note: Warner (2018) web: Observation from 2017-08-12. Rotation period 7.879±0.002 hours with a brightness amplitude of 0.64±0.02 mag. Quality Code of 3-. Currently unpublished (not on ADS). Summary figures for (90075) at the LCDB); 7.88±0.01 h 7.90±0.01 h
- Geometric albedo: 0.20 (assumed); 0.294±0.040
- Spectral type: S (assumed)
- Absolute magnitude (H): 15.2 · 15.3

(90075) 2002 VU_{94} is an asteroid on an eccentric orbit, classified as a near-Earth object and potentially hazardous asteroid of the Apollo group, approximately 2.5 kilometers in diameter. It was discovered on 13 November 2002, by astronomers of the Near-Earth Asteroid Tracking program at Palomar Observatory in California, United States. It is one of the largest potentially hazardous asteroids known.

== Orbit and classification ==
2002 VU_{94} is a member of the dynamical Apollo group, which are Earth-crossing asteroids. Apollo asteroids are the largest subgroup of near-Earth objects. It orbits the Sun at a distance of 0.9–3.4 AU once every 3 years and 1 month (1,138 days; semi-major axis of 2.13 AU). Its orbit has an eccentricity of 0.58 and an inclination of 9° with respect to the ecliptic.

The body's observation arc begins with a precovery from the Digitized Sky Survey taken at the Palomar Observatory in October 1955, or 47 years prior to its official discovery observation.

=== Close approaches ===
With an absolute magnitude of 15.3, 2002 VU_{94} is one of the brightest and largest known potentially hazardous asteroid (see PHA-list). It has an Earth minimum orbital intersection distance of 0.0301 AU (4,500,000 km), which translates into 11.7 lunar distances. On 18 May 2092, the body will make its closest near-Earth encounter at a nominal distance of 0.095 AU (37 LD). The asteroid is also Mars-crosser, crossing the orbit of the Red Planet at 1.66 AU.

== Physical characteristics ==
2002 VU_{94} is an assumed, stony S-type asteroid.

=== Rotation period ===
In 2014 and 2017, several rotational lightcurves (Note: Four lightcurve plots of (90075) 2002 VU_{94} by B. D. Warner at CS3 (2014/2017). Plot-1, Plot-2, Plot-3 and Plot-4. Summary figures at the LCDB and CS3 website.) of 2002 VU_{94} were obtained from photometric observations by American astronomer Brian Warner at the Palmer Divide Station (U82) in California. Lightcurve analysis gave a consolidated rotation period of 7.879 hours with a brightness amplitude between 0.31 and 0.64 magnitude (U=3-).

In 2017, Warner also modeled the photometric data and determined a sidereal period of 7.878512 hours, as well as a spin axis of (73.0°, −50.0°) in ecliptic coordinates (λ, β).

=== Diameter and albedo ===
According to the survey carried out by the NEOWISE mission of NASA's Wide-field Infrared Survey Explorer, 2002 VU_{94} measures 2.233 kilometers in diameter and its surface has an albedo of 0.294, while the Collaborative Asteroid Lightcurve Link assumes a standard albedo for stony asteroids of 0.20, and calculates a diameter of 2.59 kilometers based on an absolute magnitude of 15.3.

== Numbering and naming ==
This minor planet was numbered by the Minor Planet Center on 30 August 2004. As of 2018, it has not been named.
