= Jocasta (disambiguation) =

Jocasta or Iocaste (Ancient Greek: Ἰοκάστη) is a character in Greek mythology.

It may also refer to:

- Iocaste (moon), a moon of Jupiter
- Jocasta (band), a 1990s Britpop band
- Jocasta (Rome character), a minor character in the TV series Rome
- Jocasta (Marvel Comics), a Marvel Comics character
- Jocaste (crustacean), a shrimp genus
- Jocasta Nu, a minor Star Wars character
- 899 Jokaste, a minor planet orbiting the Sun
- Jocasta Ayrs, a character from the novel Cloud Atlas
- Jocasta Cameron, a character from the novel series Outlander
