= 224 Oceana =

Main-belt asteroid

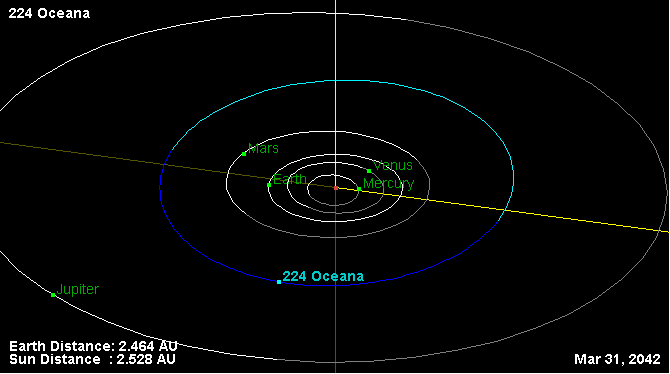
- Orbital diagram

Discovery
- Discovered by: Johann Palisa
- Discovery date: 30 March 1882

Designations
- Pronunciation: /oʊʃiːˈeɪnə/, /oʊʃiːˈɑːnə/
- Named after: Pacific Ocean
- Alternative designations: A882 FA, 1899 EA; 1933 HO
- Minor planet category: Main belt

Orbital characteristics
- Epoch 31 July 2016 (JD 2457600.5)
- Uncertainty parameter 0
- Observation arc: 117.02 yr (42742 d)
- Aphelion: 2.75930 AU (412.785 Gm)
- Perihelion: 2.53086 AU (378.611 Gm)
- Semi-major axis: 2.64508 AU (395.698 Gm)
- Eccentricity: 0.043182
- Orbital period (sidereal): 4.30 yr (1571.3 d)
- Average orbital speed: 18.31 km/s
- Mean anomaly: 1.46287°
- Mean motion: 0° 13^{m} 44.8^{s} / day
- Inclination: 5.84243°
- Longitude of ascending node: 352.815°
- Argument of perihelion: 284.346°

Physical characteristics
- Dimensions: 61.82±2.1 km
- Mass: (6.9±2.2)×10^{17} kg (Note: Calculated from its standard gravitational parameter GM = 0.046±0.015 km^{3}/s^{2}.)
- Mean density: 6.60 g/cm^{3} (Note: Assuming a diameter of 58.2 km.)
- Synodic rotation period: 9.401 h (0.3917 d)
- Geometric albedo: 0.1694±0.012
- Spectral type: M
- Absolute magnitude (H): 8.59

224 Oceana is an asteroid from the asteroid belt. It was discovered by Austrian astronomer Johann Palisa on 30 March 1882, in Vienna. It was named after the Pacific Ocean. Based upon its spectrum, it is classified as an M-type asteroid, but is not metallic.

A light curve generated from photometric observations of this asteroid at Pulkovo Observatory show a rotation period of 9.401 ± 0.001 hours and a brightness variation of 0.09 ± 0.01 in magnitude.

224 Oceana was one of five minor planets included in the 1993 study, Transition Comets -- UV Search for OH Emissions in Asteroids, which was research involving amateur astronomers who were permitted to make use of the Hubble Space Telescope.
