= Hubble search for transition comets =

Hubble search for transition comets (Transition Comets—UV Search for OH Emissions in Asteroids) was a study involving amateur astronomers and the use of the Hubble Space Telescope, one of only six studies involving amateur astronomers approved by NASA.

In the beginning years of the Hubble Space Telescope (HST) project, NASA and Congress were interested in finding ways for amateur astronomers to participate in HST research. The director of the Space Telescope Science Institute (STScI), Riccardo Giacconi, decided to allocate some of his "Director's Discretionary" time to amateur observing programs. In December 1985, the leaders of seven national amateur astronomy organizations met at STScI in Baltimore to discuss the participation of amateur astronomers in the HST project.

In December 1985, the leaders of seven national amateur astronomy organizations met at STScI in Baltimore to discuss the participation of amateur astronomers in the HST project:

   Janet Mattei, American Association of Variable Star Observers (AAVSO)
   John Westfall, Association of Lunar and Planetary Observers (ALPO)
   George Ellis, Astronomical League
   Jesse Eichenlaub, Independent Space Research Group
   Gerald Persha, International Amateur-Pro Photoelectric Photometry (IAPPP)
   David Dunham, International Occultation Timing Association (IOTA)
   Stephen Edberg, Western Amateur Astronomers[3][4]

The team used the Hubble Space Telescope to perform a spectroscopic search for OH emission from five asteroids. OH emission would indicate that the asteroids were once comets. 944 Hidalgo and 2201 Oljato move in elliptical, comet-like orbits. 182 Elsa, 224 Oceana, and 899 Jokaste are main-belt asteroids. The last three have been observed with coma (Kresak, 1977). Concurrently with the spectroscopic study, ground-based visual observations were carried out by 80 amateur astronomers in 22 countries.

== The amateur observing team ==
The final team had over 70 primary observers. Observers were located in 24 states of the U.S., and 22 different countries.

== Research and study ==
Scientists suspect that some asteroids were once comets. A comet loses part of its mass with each passage around the Sun. It would appear that some would eventually use all of their volatiles, or perhaps cover these under a blanket of dust after repeated passages around the Sun. Such an object might then have an asteroid appearance.

The asteroid 944 Hidalgo is most frequently discussed as being in a comet-like orbit. In fact, Kresak (1977) identified it as an "extinct comet nucleus". In addition, comets tend to approach Jupiter closely while asteroids do not. Hidalgo approaches Jupiter at nearly the same distance as 3 comets: Comet Encke, Comet Arend-Rigaux, and Comet Neujmin I, all of which exhibit the low levels of activity expected of comets before they become extinct.

The Pioneer Venus Orbiter detected magnetic field disturbances that are correlated with 2201 Oljato. This could be caused by an outgassing of H at a rate of about 10^{−4} that for an active comet. Oljato's possible comet-like nature is supported by its unusual UV reflectance. It has been interpreted as Rayleigh scattering from a cloud of fine particles around it.

On December 13, 1923, the astronomer Josep Comas Solá observed the asteroid 224 Oceana with a coma. The asteroid was photographed with a faint halo 30 arc-seconds across. The asteroid's magnitude was determined to be 11.6, and at the asteroid's heliocentric distance of 167 million miles, this made the coma about 24,000 miles across.

The existence of volatiles on asteroids would be of great significance to future miners of the asteroid belt. Volatiles could supply water, fuel and oxygen for missions.

For the 1993 study involving amateur astronomers and the Hubble Space Telescope, 944 Hidalgo and 2201 Oljato were examined with the Hubble Space telescope's Faint Object Spectrograph for 3085 A emission of OH. These two asteroids were selected because of the nature of their orbits, their meteor-shower associations, and their other characteristics (see Weissman et al. (1989) for a full discussion of their comet-like features). The amber detector was used in the accumulation mode with spectral element G270H. This element covers wavelengths 2325-3225 A. The aperture was 1 arc-second.

The asteroids 182 Elsa, 224 Oceana, and 899 Jokaste were also observed with the Faint Object Spectrograph, and with the same spectral element G270H.

The team leaders placed advertisements in amateur astronomy publications for amateur observers who would be willing to observe these objects in the visible spectrum from the ground, while the HST was making studies in the UV. The ground-based observers were asked to check for evidence of a dust coma.

== Results ==
The spectra for 944 Hidalgo, and 2201 Oljato are essentially identical to the solar spectrum. No OH emission, or other emission lines were apparent.

Ground-based observations of these two objects were limited to several CCD images of the area in which 2201 Oljato was calculated to appear. Both 944 Hidalgo, and 2201 Oljato were near 19th magnitude. This placed them beyond the limit of most amateur telescopes.

None of the other three asteroids showed signs of the cometary emission that would be expected from a weakly active cometary nucleus. This should not be surprising, since the targets lie in stable main-belt orbits.

Ground-based observations of 182 Elsa, 224 Oceana, and 899 Jokaste were conducted visually, photographically, with VHS, and with CCD equipment. 224 Oceana was at 12th magnitude during the HST observations. 182 Elsa was also at 12th magnitude, and 899 Jokaste appeared at 15th magnitude.

All visual observations showed point images, with no sign of a dust coma. Photographic images gave the same result. A number of observers were able to accumulate CCD images in order to reach fainter magnitudes. Using this method, two observers reported signs of a possible short tail on the asteroid 899 Jokaste. This appeared around 17th magnitude. Studies of nearby stars on the original image suggest that this was due to a small amount of trailing during guiding. There was no further evidence of a coma around any of the three asteroids.

Observations of 944 Hidalgo and 2201 Oljato had to be conducted before the Hubble Space Telescope servicing mission. As a result, the two asteroids were not in convenient positions to detect OH. Hidalgo was imaged at 5 Astronomical Units from the Sun, and moving away. This is approximately the same distance as SL-9 was before it impacted on Jupiter. The Hubble Space Telescope, using the same Faint Object Spectrograph and spectral element G270H, also failed to find any evidence of OH from SL-9.

2201 Oljato was near aphelion when it was observed. From the distance of the asteroid belt, any OH signature may have been hidden by noise in the data of the 19th magnitude asteroid. Ideally, both objects should have been studied shortly after perihelion passage.

The main-belt asteroids 224 Oceana, 182 Elsa, and 899 Jokaste were observed near opposition, but did not show any evidence of OH emission. The last two were observed when the Hubble Space Telescope was having guidance problems, and had to present special orientation to the Sun due to the loss of one solar panel. The reports of previous coma may have been due to impacts.
