= (242450) 2004 QY2 =

Asteroid on an eccentric orbit

(242450) 2004 QY_{2}
Discovery
- Discovered by: SSS
- Discovery site: Siding Spring Obs.
- Discovery date: 20 August 2004

Designations
- Minor planet category: Apollo · NEO · PHA

Orbital characteristics
- Epoch 4 September 2017 (JD 2458000.5)
- Uncertainty parameter 0
- Observation arc: 11.61 yr (4,242 days)
- Aphelion: 1.6013 AU
- Perihelion: 0.5666 AU
- Semi-major axis: 1.0840 AU
- Eccentricity: 0.4773
- Orbital period (sidereal): 1.13 yr (412 days)
- Mean anomaly: 123.98°
- Mean motion: 0° 52^{m} 23.88^{s} / day
- Inclination: 37.026°
- Longitude of ascending node: 295.31°
- Argument of perihelion: 104.96°
- Earth MOID: 0.0469 AU · 18.3 LD

Physical characteristics
- Mean diameter: 2.914±0.084 km 3.320 km
- Geometric albedo: 0.274±0.044
- Absolute magnitude (H): 14.7

(242450) 2004 QY_{2} is an asteroid on an eccentric orbit, classified as a near-Earth object and potentially hazardous asteroid of the Apollo group, approximately 3 kilometers (2 miles) in diameter. It was discovered on 20 August 2004 by the Siding Spring Survey at an apparent magnitude of 16.5 using the 0.5-metre (20 in) Uppsala Southern Schmidt Telescope. It is one of the largest potentially hazardous asteroids known to exist.

== Orbit and classification ==
2004 QY_{2} orbits the Sun at a distance of 0.6–1.6 AU once every 14 months (412 days; semi-major axis of 1.08 AU). Its orbit has an eccentricity of 0.48 and an inclination of 37° with respect to the ecliptic. The body's observation arc begins with its official discovery observation at Siding Spring.

The object is a member of the Apollo asteroids, the largest subgroup of near-Earth asteroids which cross the orbit of Earth. Unlike many other members of this dynamical group, 2004 QY_{2} is not a Mars-crosser, as its aphelion is too small to cross the orbit of the Red Planet at 1.66 AU.

=== Close approaches ===
With an absolute magnitude of 14.7, 2004 QY_{2} is one of the brightest potentially hazardous asteroids ever discovered (see PHA-list). It has an Earth minimum orbital intersection distance of 0.0469 AU (7,020,000 km), which translates into 18.3 lunar distances. On 29 July 2012, it passed Earth at a distance of 0.4314 AU (64,540,000 km; 40,100,000 mi).

=== Sentry Risk Table ===
Due to its originally estimated size of 5.5 kilometers, 2004 QY_{2} was one of the largest objects to appear on the Sentry Risk Table. It was removed from the Sentry Risk Table on 25 August 2004.

== Physical characteristics ==
According to the survey carried out by the NEOWISE mission of NASA's Wide-field Infrared Survey Explorer, 2004 QY_{2} has an albedo of 0.274, and it measures 2.914 and 3.320 kilometers in diameter, respectively.

As of 2018, no rotational lightcurve of 2004 QY_{2} has been obtained from photometric observations. The body's rotation period, shape and spin axis remain unknown. In addition, the body's spectral type has never been assessed.

== Numbering and naming ==
This minor planet was numbered by the Minor Planet Center on 26 June 2006. As of 2018, it has not been named.
