= O-type asteroid =

Asteroid spectral type

O-type asteroids are a rare type of asteroids that have spectra similar to the unusual asteroid 3628 Boznemcová, which is the best asteroid match to the spectra of L6 and LL6 ordinary chondrite meteorites. Their spectra have a deep absorption feature longward of 0.75 μm.

== List ==
Seven asteroids have been classified as O-type by the second Small Main-Belt Asteroid Spectroscopic Survey (SMASSII) and none by Tholen's Eight-Color Asteroid Survey. With the exception of main-belt asteroid 3628 Božněmcová, all other bodies are near-Earth asteroids from the Apollo, Aten or Amor group:

Designation	Class	Diam.	Refs
3628 Božněmcová	main-belt	6.914 km	MPC · JPL
4034 Vishnu	Apollo	0.42 km	MPC · JPL
4341 Poseidon	Apollo	2 km	MPC · JPL
5143 Heracles	Apollo	4.843 km	MPC · JPL
(8201) 1994 AH2	Apollo	1.859 km	MPC · JPL
(162385) 2000 BM19	Aten	0.57 km	MPC · JPL
1997 RT	Amor	0.3 km	MPC · JPL
Diameter: averaged estimates only; may change over time

== See also ==
- Asteroid spectral types
