= 899 Jokaste =

Minor planet

Discovery
- Discovered by: Max Wolf
- Discovery site: Heidelberg
- Discovery date: 3 August 1918

Designations
- Pronunciation: German: [joːkastə] Classically: p/dʒoʊˈkæstiː/
- Alternative designations: 1918 EB

Orbital characteristics
- Epoch 31 July 2016 (JD 2457600.5)
- Uncertainty parameter 0
- Observation arc: 97.71 yr (35688 days)
- Aphelion: 3.4884 AU (521.86 Gm)
- Perihelion: 2.3242 AU (347.70 Gm)
- Semi-major axis: 2.9063 AU (434.78 Gm)
- Eccentricity: 0.20028
- Orbital period (sidereal): 4.95 yr (1809.7 d)
- Mean anomaly: 229.912°
- Mean motion: 0° 11^{m} 56.148^{s} / day
- Inclination: 12.467°
- Longitude of ascending node: 252.430°
- Argument of perihelion: 127.690°
- Earth MOID: 1.35068 AU (202.059 Gm)
- Jupiter MOID: 2.07017 AU (309.693 Gm)
- T_{Jupiter}: 3.220

Physical characteristics
- Mean radius: 13.845±0.45 km
- Synodic rotation period: 6.245 h (0.2602 d)
- Geometric albedo: 0.2026±0.014
- Absolute magnitude (H): 10.14

899 Jokaste is a minor planet orbiting the Sun. It was one of five minor planets included in the 1993 study, Transition Comets -- UV Search for OH Emissions in Asteroids, which was research involving amateur astronomers who were permitted to make use of the Hubble Space Telescope. Not to be confused with Iocaste, a moon of Jupiter.
