= Potentially hazardous object =

Hazardous near-Earth asteroid or comet

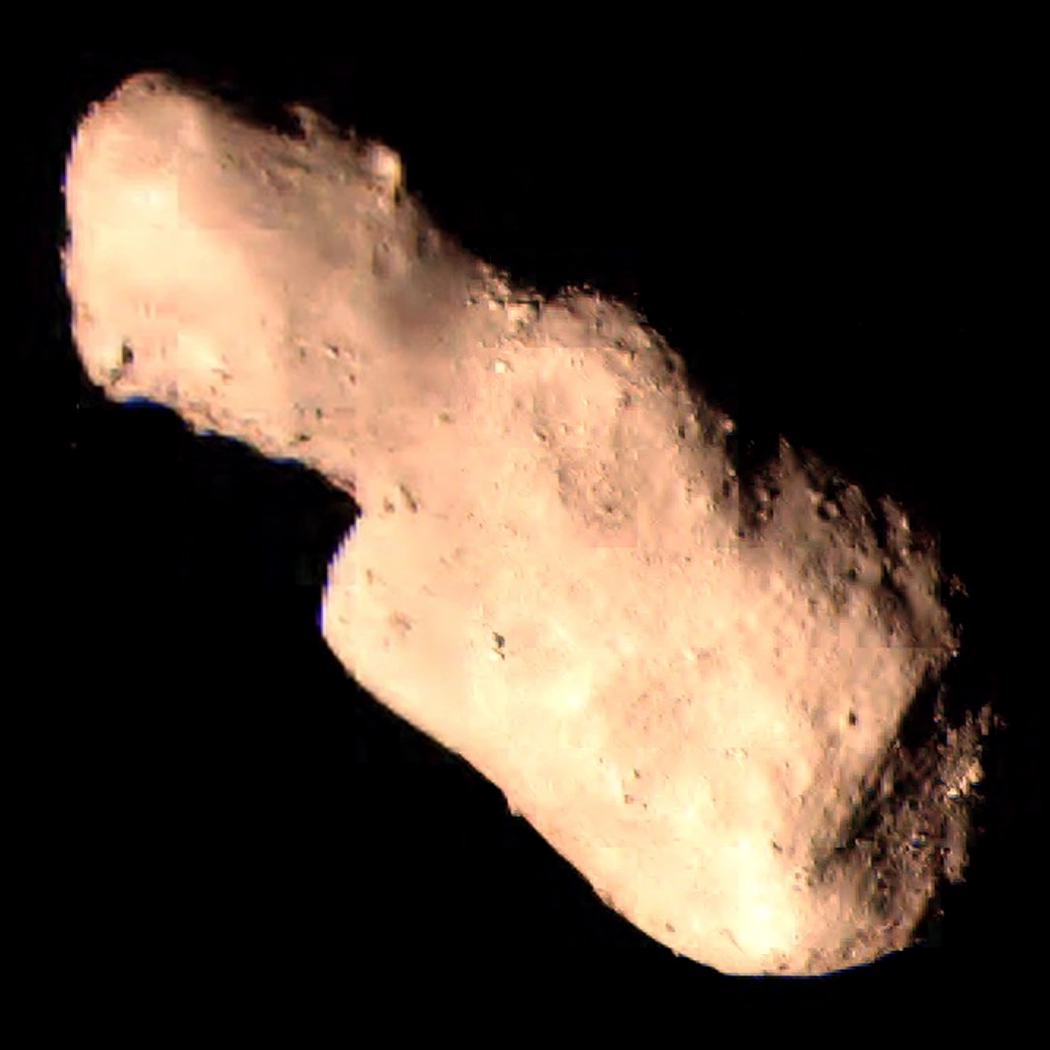
The asteroid Toutatis is listed as a potentially hazardous near-Earth asteroid, yet poses no immediate threat to Earth. (Optical image taken by Chang'e 2 in 2012.)

A potentially hazardous object (PHO) is a near-Earth object – either an asteroid or a comet – with an orbit that can make close approaches to the Earth and which is large enough to cause significant regional damage in the event of impact. They are conventionally defined as having a minimum orbit intersection distance with Earth of less than 0.05 astronomical units (19.5 lunar distances) and an absolute magnitude of 22 or brighter, the latter of which roughly corresponds to a size larger than 140 meters. More than 99% of the known potentially hazardous objects pose no impact threat over the next 100 years. As of February 2025, just 21 of the known potentially hazardous objects listed on the Sentry Risk Table could not be excluded as potential threats over the next hundred years. Over hundreds if not thousands of years, though, the orbits of some "potentially hazardous" asteroids can evolve to live up to their name.

Most of these objects are potentially hazardous asteroids (PHAs), and a few are comets. As of November 2022 there are 2,304 known PHAs (about 8% of the total near-Earth population), of which 153 are estimated to be larger than one kilometer in diameter. (Note: An object's calculated mean diameter is only a rough estimate. It is inferred from the object's varying brightness—observed and measured at various times—and the assumed, yet often unknown reflectivity of its surface. NASA's Asteroid Size Estimator is a tool for a generic absolute magnitude-to-diameter conversion for an assumed geometric albedo.) Most of the discovered PHAs are Apollo asteroids (1,965) and fewer belong to the group of Aten asteroids (185).

A potentially hazardous object can be known not to be a threat to Earth for the next 100 years or more, if its orbit is reasonably well determined. Potentially hazardous asteroids with some threat of impacting Earth in the next 100 years are listed on the Sentry Risk Table. As of September 2022, only 17 potentially hazardous asteroids are listed on the Sentry Risk Table. Most potentially hazardous asteroids are ruled out as hazardous to at least several hundreds of years when their competing best orbit models are sufficiently constrained, but recent discoveries whose orbital constraints are little-known have divergent or incomplete mechanical models until observation yields further data. After several astronomical surveys, the number of known PHAs has increased tenfold since the end of the 1990s. The Minor Planet Center's website List of the Potentially Hazardous Asteroids also publishes detailed information for these objects.

In May 2021, NASA astronomers reported that 5 to 10 years of preparation may be needed to avoid a potential impactor, as most recently based on a simulated exercise conducted by the 2021 Planetary Defense Conference.

== Overview ==
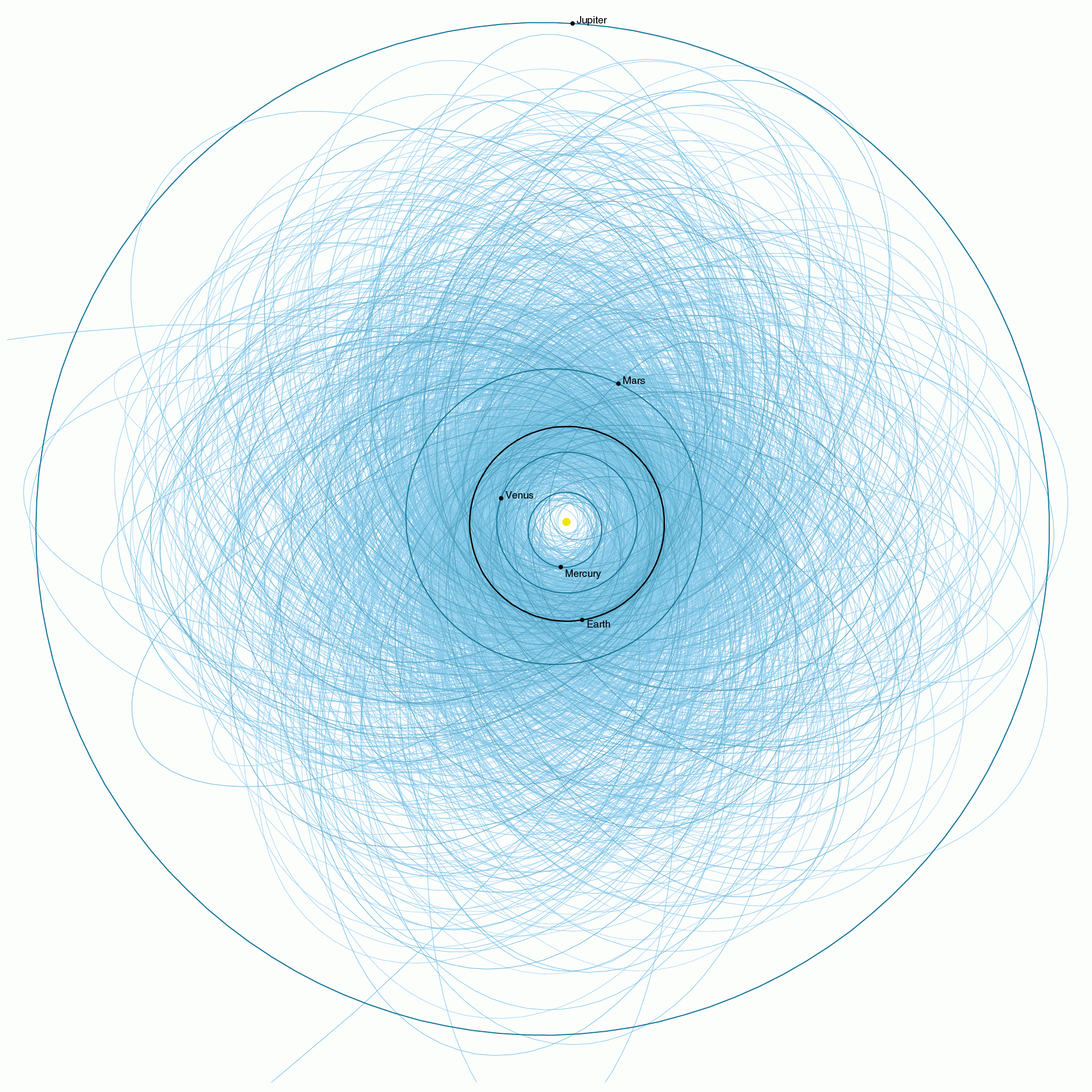
Plot of orbits of known potentially hazardous asteroids, with sizes over 140 metres (460 ft) and that pass within 7.6 million kilometres (4.7×10^{6} mi) of Earth's orbit. Epoch as of early 2013.

An object is considered a PHO if its minimum orbit intersection distance (MOID) with respect to Earth is less than 0.05 AU (7,500,000 km; 4,600,000 mi)— approximately 19.5 lunar distances— and its absolute magnitude is brighter than 22, approximately corresponding to a diameter above 140 meters (460 ft). This is big enough to cause regional devastation to human settlements unprecedented in human history in the case of a land impact, or a major tsunami in the case of an ocean impact. Such impact events occur on average around once per 10,000 years. NEOWISE data estimates that there are 4,700 ± 1,500 potentially hazardous asteroids with a diameter greater than 100 meters.

=== Levels of hazard ===
The two main scales used to categorize the impact hazards of asteroids are the Palermo scale and the Torino scale.

=== Potentially hazardous comet ===
A potentially hazardous comet (PHC) is a comet which meets the definition for a PHO. Known PHCs include: 109P/Swift-Tuttle, 55P/Tempel–Tuttle, 15P/Finlay, 289P/Blanpain, 255P/Levy, 206P/Barnard–Boattini, 21P/Giacobini–Zinner, and 73P/Schwassmann–Wachmann. Halley's Comet fit the criteria before AD 837, when it passed the Earth at a distance of 0.033 AU. It now has an MOID of 0.075 AU.

=== Numbers ===
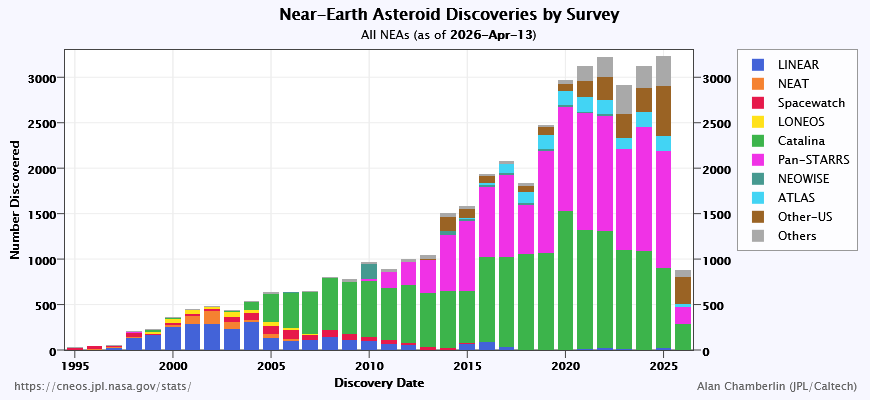
Detected NEAs by various projects. The broader class of NEAs includes all PHAs as a subset.: LINEAR; NEAT; Spacewatch; LONEOS; CSS / Pan-STARRS; NEOWISE; ATLAS; Other - US; Others

In 2012 NASA estimated 20 to 30 percent of these objects have been found. During an asteroid's close approaches to another planet it will be subject to gravitational perturbation, modifying its orbit, and potentially changing a previously non-threatening asteroid into a PHA or vice versa. This is a reflection of the dynamic character of the Solar System.

Several astronomical survey projects such as Lincoln Near-Earth Asteroid Research, Catalina Sky Survey and Pan-STARRS continue to search for more PHOs. Each one found is studied by various means, including optical, radar, and infrared to determine its characteristics, such as size, composition, rotation state, and to more accurately determine its orbit. Both professional and amateur astronomers participate in such observation and tracking.

=== Size ===
Asteroids larger than approximately 35 meters (approximately 115 feet) across can pose a threat to a town or city. However the diameter of most small asteroids is not well determined, as it is usually only estimated based on their brightness and distance, rather than directly measured, e.g. from radar observations. For this reason NASA and the Jet Propulsion Laboratory use the more practical measure of absolute magnitude (H). Any asteroid with an absolute magnitude of 22.0 or brighter is assumed to be of the required size.

Only a coarse estimation of size can be found from the object's magnitude because an assumption must be made for its albedo which is also not usually known for certain. The NASA near-Earth object program uses an assumed albedo of 0.14 for this purpose. In May 2016, the asteroid size estimates arising from the Wide-field Infrared Survey Explorer and NEOWISE missions have been questioned. Although the early original criticism had not undergone peer review, a more recent peer-reviewed study was subsequently published.

== Largest PHAs ==
With a mean diameter of approximately 7 kilometers (4.3 miles), Apollo asteroid (53319) 1999 JM8 is likely the largest known potentially hazardous object, despite its fainter absolute magnitude of 15.2, compared to other listed objects in the table below (note: calculated mean diameters in table are inferred from the object's brightness and its (assumed) albedo. They are only an approximation.).

Brightest Potentially Hazardous Asteroids
| Designation | Discovery | | | (H) (mag) | D (km) | Orbital description | | | | | | | Remarks | References |
| Designation | Year | Place | Discoverer | (H) (mag) | D (km) | Class | a (AU) | e | i (°) | q (AU) | Q (AU) | MOID (AU) | Remarks | References |
|---|---|---|---|---|---|---|---|---|---|---|---|---|---|---|
| (4953) 1990 MU | 1990 | 413 | R. H. McNaught | 14.1 | 3 | APO | 1.621 | 0.658 | 24.4 | 0.555 | 2.687 | 0.02640 | — | MPC · JPL · catalog |
| 3122 Florence | 1981 | 413 | S. J. Bus | 14.1 | 5 | AMO | 1.769 | 0.423 | 22.2 | 1.020 | 2.518 | 0.04430 | — | MPC · JPL · catalog |
| (16960) 1998 QS52 | 1998 | 704 | LINEAR | 14.3 | 4 | APO | 2.203 | 0.858 | 17.5 | 0.313 | 4.093 | 0.01443 | — | MPC · JPL · catalog |
| 4183 Cuno | 1959 | 074 | C. Hoffmeister | 14.4 | 4 | APO | 1.982 | 0.634 | 6.7 | 0.725 | 3.240 | 0.02825 | — | MPC · JPL · catalog |
| 3200 Phaethon | 1983 | 500 | IRAS | 14.6 | 5.8 | APO | 1.271 | 0.890 | 22.3 | 0.140 | 2.402 | 0.01945 | — | MPC · JPL · catalog |
| (242450) 2004 QY2 | 2004 | E12 | Siding Spring Survey | 14.7 | 3 | APO | 1.084 | 0.477 | 37.0 | 0.567 | 1.601 | 0.04686 | — | MPC · JPL · catalog |
| (89830) 2002 CE | 2002 | 704 | LINEAR | 14.9 | 3.1 | AMO | 2.077 | 0.507 | 43.7 | 1.023 | 3.131 | 0.02767 | — | MPC · JPL · catalog |
| (137427) 1999 TF211 | 1999 | 704 | LINEAR | 15.1 | 2.9 | APO | 2.448 | 0.610 | 39.2 | 0.955 | 3.942 | 0.01787 | — | MPC · JPL · catalog |
| (111253) 2001 XU10 | 2001 | 704 | LINEAR | 15.2 | 3 | APO | 1.754 | 0.439 | 42.0 | 0.983 | 2.524 | 0.02934 | — | MPC · JPL · catalog |
| (53319) 1999 JM8 | 1999 | 704 | LINEAR | 15.2 | 7 | APO | 2.726 | 0.641 | 13.8 | 0.978 | 4.474 | 0.02346 | Likely largest PHO | MPC · JPL · catalog |
| 1981 Midas | 1973 | 675 | C. T. Kowal | 15.2 | 2 | APO | 1.776 | 0.650 | 39.8 | 0.621 | 2.931 | 0.00449 | — | MPC · JPL · catalog |
| 2201 Oljato | 1947 | 690 | H. L. Giclas | 15.25 | 2.1 | APO | 2.175 | 0.713 | 2.5 | 0.624 | 3.726 | 0.00305 | — | MPC · JPL · catalog |
| (90075) 2002 VU94 | 2002 | 644 | NEAT | 15.3 | 2.2 | APO | 2.134 | 0.576 | 8.9 | 0.904 | 3.363 | 0.03010 | — | MPC · JPL · catalog |
| 4179 Toutatis | 1989 | 010 | C. Pollas | 15.30 | 2.5 | APO | 2.536 | 0.629 | 0.4 | 0.940 | 4.132 | 0.00615 | — | MPC · JPL · catalog |
| (159857) 2004 LJ1 | 2004 | 704 | LINEAR | 15.4 | 3 | APO | 2.264 | 0.593 | 23.1 | 0.920 | 3.607 | 0.01682 | — | MPC · JPL · catalog |
| (85713) 1998 SS49 | 1998 | 704 | LINEAR | 15.6 | 3.5 | APO | 1.924 | 0.639 | 10.8 | 0.694 | 3.154 | 0.00234 | — | MPC · JPL · catalog |
| 4486 Mithra | 1987 | 071 | E. W. Elst; V. G. Shkodrov | 15.6 | 2 | APO | 2.200 | 0.663 | 3.0 | 0.742 | 3.658 | 0.04626 | — | MPC · JPL · catalog |
| 1620 Geographos | 1951 | 675 | A. G. Wilson; R. Minkowski | 15.60 | 2.5 | APO | 1.245 | 0.335 | 13.3 | 0.828 | 1.663 | 0.03007 | — | MPC · JPL · catalog |
| (415029) 2011 UL21 | 2011 | 703 | CSS | 15.7 | 2.5 | APO | 2.122 | 0.653 | 34.9 | 0.736 | 3.509 | 0.01925 | — | MPC · JPL · catalog |
| (242216) 2003 RN10 | 2003 | 699 | LONEOS | 15.7 | 2.5 | AMO | 2.231 | 0.541 | 39.6 | 1.024 | 3.438 | 0.00956 | — | MPC · JPL · catalog |
| 12923 Zephyr | 1999 | 699 | LONEOS | 15.8 | 2 | APO | 1.962 | 0.492 | 5.3 | 0.996 | 2.927 | 0.02115 | — | MPC · JPL · catalog |
| (52768) 1998 OR2 | 1998 | 566 | NEAT | 15.8 | 2 | APO | 2.380 | 0.573 | 5.9 | 1.017 | 3.743 | 0.01573 | — | MPC · JPL · catalog |

=== Statistics ===
Below is a list of the largest PHAs (based on absolute magnitude, H ) discovered in a given year. Historical data of the cumulative number of discovered PHA since 1999 are displayed in the bar charts— one for the total number and the other for objects larger than one kilometer. PHAs brighter than absolute magnitude 17.75 are likely larger than 1 km in size.

Brightest PHA discoveries of each calendar year since 1989
| Number | Name | Year | (H) | Refs |
|---|---|---|---|---|
| 4179 | Toutatis | 1989 | 15.3 | MPC · JPL · catalog |
| 4953 | 1990 MU | 1990 | 14.9 | MPC · JPL · catalog |
| 7341 | 1991 VH | 1991 | 17.0 | MPC · JPL · catalog |
| 10115 | 1992 SK | 1992 | 17.2 | MPC · JPL · catalog |
| 39572 | 1993 DQ_{1} | 1993 | 16.6 | MPC · JPL · catalog |
| 7482 | 1994 PC_{1} | 1994 | 16.7 | MPC · JPL · catalog |
| 243566 | 1995 SA | 1995 | 17.4 | MPC · JPL · catalog |
| 8566 | 1996 EN | 1996 | 16.3 | MPC · JPL · catalog |
| 35396 | 1997 XF11 | 1997 | 17.0 | MPC · JPL · catalog |
| 16960 | 1998 QS_{52} | 1998 | 14.4 | MPC · JPL · catalog |
| 137427 | 1999 TF_{211} | 1999 | 15.3 | MPC · JPL · catalog |
| 138095 | 2000 DK_{79} | 2000 | 16.0 | MPC · JPL · catalog |
| 111253 | 2001 XU_{10} | 2001 | 15.3 | MPC · JPL · catalog |
| 89830 | 2002 CE | 2002 | 15.0 | MPC · JPL · catalog |
| 242216 | 2003 RN_{10} | 2003 | 15.7 | MPC · JPL · catalog |
| 242450 | 2004 QY_{2} | 2004 | 14.6 | MPC · JPL · catalog |
| 308242 | 2005 GO_{21} | 2005 | 16.3 | MPC · JPL · catalog |
| 374851 | 2006 VV_{2} | 2006 | 16.7 | MPC · JPL · catalog |
| 214869 | 2007 PA_{8} | 2007 | 16.5 | MPC · JPL · catalog |
| 294739 | 2008 CM | 2008 | 17.1 | MPC · JPL · catalog |
| 523630 | 2009 OG | 2009 | 16.2 | MPC · JPL · catalog |
| 458122 | 2010 EW_{45} | 2010 | 17.6 | MPC · JPL · catalog |
| 415029 | 2011 UL_{21} | 2011 | 15.9 | MPC · JPL · catalog |
| 746849 | 2012 HJ1 | 2012 | 17.9 | MPC · JPL · catalog |
| 507716 | 2013 UP_{8} | 2013 | 16.4 | MPC · JPL · catalog |
| 533671 | Nabu | 2014 | 16.1 | MPC · JPL · catalog |
| 802885 | 2015 HY116 | 2015 | 17.6 | MPC · JPL · — |
| 620095 | 2016 CB194 | 2016 | 17.6 | MPC · JPL · catalog |
| – | 2017 CH1 | 2017 | 17.9 | MPC · JPL · — |
| 756316 | 2018 XV5 | 2018 | 17.7 | MPC · JPL · catalog |
| – | 2019 RU3 | 2019 | 18.1 | MPC · JPL · — |
| – | 2020 SL1 | 2020 | 17.7 | MPC · JPL · — |
| – | 2021 HK12 | 2021 | 17.7 | MPC · JPL · — |
| – | 2022 AP7 | 2022 | 17.3 | MPC · JPL · — |
| 887030 | 2023 QF5 | 2023 | 18.3 | MPC · JPL · — |
| – | 2024 YU4 | 2024 | 19.0 | MPC · JPL · — |

Cumulative number of discovered potentially hazardous asteroids larger than 1 kilometer as of January 1 each year. As of January 2025, there are 154 known PHAs larger than one kilometer.
Cumulative number of all discovered PHAs as of January 1 of each year. As of January 2025, there are 2473 PHAs.

== Gallery ==
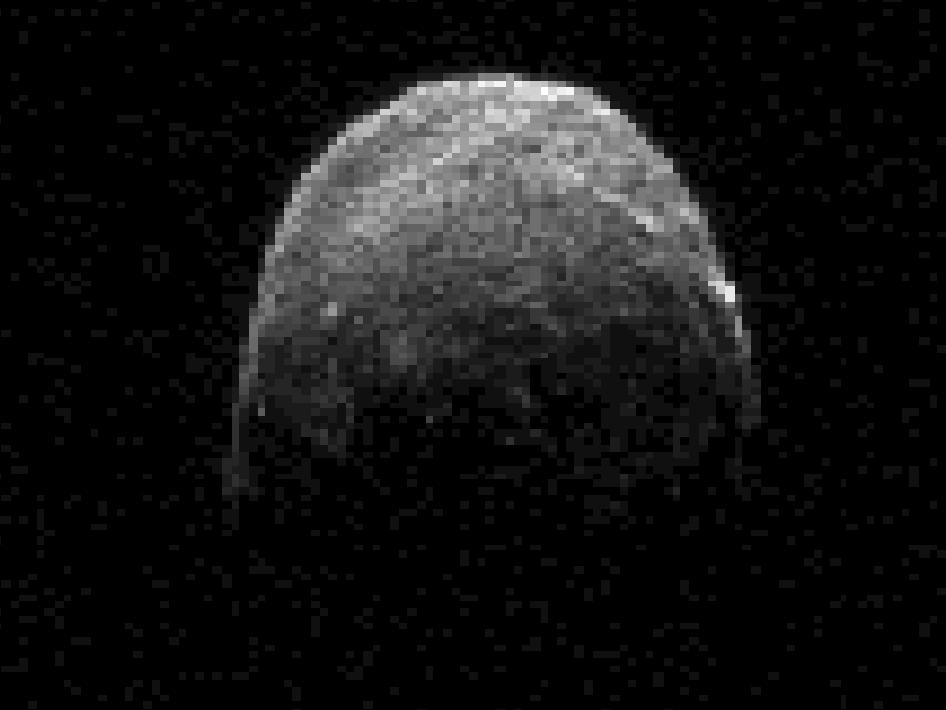
Radar image of the 350-meter PHO (308635) 2005 YU55

== See also ==
- Asteroid impact avoidance
- Earth-grazing fireball
- Global catastrophic risk
- List of asteroid close approaches to Earth
- Scout (NASA program) – JPL program to monitor the Minor Planet Center's catalog for Earth impacts; short term warnings
- Sentry (monitoring system) – JPL program to monitor the Minor Planet Center's catalog for Earth impacts
- Spaceguard – Efforts to study asteroids that might impact Earth
