= 3628 Božněmcová =

Asteroid

Discovery
- Discovered by: Z. Vávrová
- Discovery site: Kleť Obs.
- Discovery date: 25 November 1979

Designations
- Named after: Božena Němcová (Czech writer)
- Alternative designations: 1979 WD · 1930 MQ; 1962 JP · 1975 XT_{4} 1978 JX · 1979 YB_{10} 1985 CQ_{2}
- Minor planet category: main-belt · (middle)

Orbital characteristics
- Epoch 4 September 2017 (JD 2458000.5)
- Uncertainty parameter 0
- Observation arc: 86.76 yr (31,689 days)
- Aphelion: 3.2963 AU
- Perihelion: 1.7799 AU
- Semi-major axis: 2.5381 AU
- Eccentricity: 0.2987
- Orbital period (sidereal): 4.04 yr (1,477 days)
- Mean anomaly: 174.61°
- Mean motion: 0° 14^{m} 37.32^{s} / day
- Inclination: 6.8866°
- Longitude of ascending node: 156.74°
- Argument of perihelion: 187.79°

Physical characteristics
- Dimensions: 5.40±1.17 km 6.914±0.143 km 8.14±0.34 km 8.18 km (calculated)
- Synodic rotation period: 3.335410±0.000057 h
- Geometric albedo: 0.20 (assumed); 0.256±0.024; 0.32±0.13; 0.3370±0.0705; 0.359±0.029
- Spectral type: SMASS = O · O
- Absolute magnitude (H): 12.60 · 12.8 · 13.05±0.34 · 13.11

3628 Božněmcová, provisional designation 1979 WD, is a rare O-type asteroid from the middle region of the asteroid belt, approximately 7 kilometers in diameter. It was discovered on 25 November 1979, by Czech astronomer Zdeňka Vávrová at Kleť Observatory in the Czech Republic. It is named for Czech writer Božena Němcová.

== Orbit and classification ==
Božněmcová orbits the Sun in the central main-belt at a distance of 1.8–3.3 AU once every 4.04 years (1,477 days). Its orbit has an eccentricity of 0.30 and an inclination of 7° with respect to the ecliptic. It was first identified as 1930 MQ at Lowell Observatory in 1930, extending the body's observation arc by 49 years prior to its official discovery observation at Klet.

== Physical characteristics ==
In the SMASS taxonomy, Božněmcová is a bright O-type asteroid, a rare group with spectra that best fits those of the L6 and LL6 ordinary chondrite-type meteorites.

=== Rotation period ===
In September 2007, a rotational lightcurve of Božněmcová was obtained from photometric observations by American astronomer Brian Warner at his Palmer Divide Observatory in Colorado. Lightcurve analysis gave a well-defined rotation period of 3.335410 hours with a low brightness amplitude of 0.09 magnitude (U=3).

=== Diameter and albedo ===
According to the surveys carried out by the Japanese Akari satellite and NASA's Wide-field Infrared Survey Explorer with its subsequent NEOWISE mission, Božněmcová measures between 5.40 and 8.14 kilometers in diameter, and its surface has an albedo between 0.256 and 0.359. The Collaborative Asteroid Lightcurve Link assumes a standard albedo for stony asteroids of 0.20 and calculates a diameter of 8.18 kilometers at an absolute magnitude of 12.8, as the lower the albedo (reflectivity), the larger the body's diameter for an unchanged brightness.

== Naming ==
This minor planet was named in memory of Božena Němcová (1820–1862), a Czech writer, author of the novella The Grandmother (Czech: Babička), the most frequently read book in Czech literature. The official naming citation was published by the Minor Planet Center on 4 June 1993 (M.P.C. 22245).
