= (4953) 1990 MU =

Asteroid

- Orbit of asteroid (4953) 1990 MU viewed from the north ecliptic pole at the epoch of 1 January 2010

Discovery
- Discovered by: Robert H. McNaught
- Discovery site: Siding Spring Obs
- Discovery date: 23 June 1990

Designations
- Minor planet category: NEO · Apollo · PHA

Orbital characteristics
- Epoch 13 January 2016 (JD 2457400.5)
- Uncertainty parameter 0
- Observation arc: 41.16 yr (15032 days)
- Earliest precovery date: 21 July 1974 (Siding Spring Observatory)
- Aphelion: 2.6874 AU (402.03 Gm)
- Perihelion: 0.55508 AU (83.039 Gm)
- Semi-major axis: 1.6212 AU (242.53 Gm)
- Eccentricity: 0.65762
- Orbital period (sidereal): 2.06 yr (754.00 d)
- Average orbital speed: .4774 deg/day
- Mean anomaly: 197.22°
- Mean motion: 0.47746°/day
- Inclination: 24.388°
- Longitude of ascending node: 77.737°
- Argument of perihelion: 77.748°
- Earth MOID: 0.0256049 AU (3,830,440 km)

Physical characteristics
- Mean diameter: 2.8 km
- Synodic rotation period: 14.218 h
- Absolute magnitude (H): 14.1

(4953) 1990 MU is a large Earth-crossing asteroid (ECA) belonging to the Apollo group of near-Earth objects which also cross the orbits of Mars and Venus. At approximately 3 km in diameter, it is one of the largest known ECAs. It has been assigned the permanent number (4953) from the Minor Planet Center. With an observation arc of 45 years, the asteroid's orbit is well defined, and its trajectory is accurately predictable through to the year 2186.

== Description ==
1990 MU was first observed over three nights in 1990. By itself, this was not enough for the asteroid to be given a permanent number since the orbit could not be calculated accurately enough for the object to be subsequently recovered. However, the object was precovered by the Anglo-Australian Near-Earth Asteroid Survey on six photographic plates from the UK Schmidt Telescope dating back to 1974. This technique has more success with the Amor group of asteroids which do not cross the orbit of the Earth and consequently have long periods of opposition when they can be observed. In this respect the Apollo asteroid 1990 MU is somewhat unusual.

Line of intersection of orbits of 1990 MU and Earth's ecliptic plane

Animation of 1990 MU's orbit around Sun – 2027 close approach Earth · Sun · 1990 MU

1990 MU has an Earth minimum orbit intersection distance (MOID) of 0.0263 AU (3,930,000 km), which is close enough to classify it as a potentially hazardous asteroid (PHA). It will make a close approach to Earth on 6 June 2027 at 0.0308 AU (4,610,000 km), becoming as bright as apparent magnitude 9.7 on 8 June 2027, and even closer on 5 June 2058 at 0.0231 AU (3,460,000 km). It also made a close approach to Venus on 5 October 2012 at 0.0567 AU (8,480,000 km) and will again on 3 September 2041 at 0.0581 AU (8,690,000 km). 1990 MU has made close approaches to Earth in the past; in June 1996 it approached within 0.25 AU and in May 1990 it approached to 0.1418 AU. The Earth MOID of 1990 MU has been decreasing (becoming more hazardous) during the 20th century, while the Venus MOID (0.0455) has been increasing.

Besides its original discovery at Siding Spring Observatory in Australia, 1990 MU has also been studied by radar at Goldstone Observatory in California, and Arecibo Observatory in Puerto Rico. Lightcurves have been obtained at La Silla Observatory in Chile.

The albedo of 1990 MU was measured by the ExploreNEOs project of the Spitzer Space Telescope in August 2009. The result obtained was 0.79 and was the second highest albedo measured by the project. However, ExploreNEO do not believe this is a plausible figure, they state that the albedo of an NEO is not likely to be much over 0.5 and their measurement uncertainty is "around a factor of 2".

The Gaia mission of the European Space Agency, launched in December 2013, has been tasked with measuring the Yarkovsky effect on near-Earth asteroids (NEAs). The Yarkovsky effect is a small non-gravitational force on rotating bodies that can affect their trajectories. Its effect on small bodies like asteroids can be significant and needs to be taken into account in predicting an asteroid's position. 1990 MU has been selected as one of the most promising NEAs for this measurement by Gaia.

H < 15 asteroids passing less than 10 LD from Earth
Asteroid	Date	Nominal approach distance (LD)	84% chance at least (LD)	84% chance at most (LD)	Absolute magnitude (H)	Size (meters)
3200 Phaethon	2093-12-14	7.714	7.709	7.719	14.6	5100
(4953) 1990 MU	2058-06-05	8.986	8.984	8.988	14.1	3000

== See also ==
- List of Mars-crossing minor planets
- List of Venus-crossing minor planets
