= 5731 Zeus =

Apollo asteroid and near-Earth object

Zeus
Discovery
- Discovered by: C. S. Shoemaker
- Discovery site: Palomar Observatory
- Discovery date: 4 November 1988

Designations
- Pronunciation: /ˈzjuːs/
- Named after: Zeus
- Alternative designations: 1988 VP4
- Minor planet category: Apollo

Orbital characteristics
- Epoch 13 January 2016 (JD 2457400.5)
- Uncertainty parameter 0
- Observation arc: 9972 days (27.30 yr)
- Aphelion: 3.742369097314678 AU (559.85044833175 Gm)
- Perihelion: 0.7835569964232790 AU (117.21845823701 Gm)
- Semi-major axis: 2.262963046869 AU (338.5344532844 Gm)
- Eccentricity: 0.6537473302944990
- Orbital period (sidereal): 3.40 yr (1243.4 d)
- Mean anomaly: 322.1440564184060°
- Mean motion: 0° 17^{m} 22.294^{s} / day
- Inclination: 11.42805771205560°
- Longitude of ascending node: 281.6911159636840°
- Argument of perihelion: 217.0194868226350°
- Earth MOID: 0.0717527 AU (10.73405 Gm)

Physical characteristics
- Absolute magnitude (H): 15.6

5731 Zeus /ˈzjuːs/ is an Apollo asteroid and near-Earth object discovered on 4 November 1988, by Carolyn Shoemaker at Palomar Observatory. Based on its observed brightness and assumed albedo it is estimated to have a diameter between 2.1 and 4.7 km. It is named after the Greek god of thunder and the sky, Zeus.
