= Asteroid spectral types =

Classification type of a class of astronomical objects

Distribution of asteroid spectral types by distance from the Sun

An asteroid spectral type is assigned to asteroids based on their reflectance spectrum, color, and sometimes albedo. These types are thought to correspond to an asteroid's surface composition. For small bodies that are not internally differentiated, the surface and internal compositions are presumably similar, while large bodies such as Ceres and Vesta are known to have internal structure. Over the years, there has been a number of surveys that resulted in a set of different taxonomic systems such as the Tholen, SMASS and Bus–DeMeo classifications.

== Taxonomic systems ==
In 1975, astronomers Clark R. Chapman, David Morrison, and Ben Zellner developed a simple taxonomic system for asteroids based on color, albedo, and spectral shape. The three categories were labelled "C" for dark carbonaceous objects, "S" for stony (siliceous) objects, and "U" for those that did not fit into either C or S. This basic division of asteroid spectra has since been expanded and clarified. A number of classification schemes are currently in existence, and while they strive to retain some mutual consistency, quite a few asteroids are sorted into different classes depending on the particular scheme. This is due to the use of different criteria for each approach. The two most widely used classifications are described below:

=== Overview of Tholen and SMASS ===
Summary of asteroid taxonomic classes
Tholen Class	SMASSII (Bus Class)	Albedo	Spectral Features
A	A	moderate	Very steep red slope shortward of 0.75 μm; moderately deep absorption feature longward of 0.75 μm.
B, F	B	low	Linear, generally featureless spectra. Differences in UV absorption features and presence/absence of narrow absorption feature near 0.7 μm.
C, G	C, Cb, Ch, Cg, Chg	low	Linear, generally featureless spectra. Differences in UV absorption features and presence/absence of narrow absorption feature near 0.7 μm.
D	D	low	Relatively featureless spectrum with very steep red slope.
E, M, P	X, Xc, Xe, Xk	from low (P) to very high (E)	Generally featureless spectrum with reddish slope; differences in subtle absorption features and/or spectral curvature and/or peak relative reflectance.
Q	Q	moderate	Reddish slope shortward of 0.7 μm; deep, rounded absorption feature longward of 0.75 μm.
R	R	moderate	Moderate reddish slope downward of 0.7 μm; deep absorption longward of 0.75 μm.
S	S, Sa, Sk, Sl, Sq, Sr	moderate	Moderately steep reddish slope downward of 0.7 μm; moderate to steep absorption longward of 0.75 μm; peak of reflectance at 0.73 μm. Bus subgroups intermediate between S and A, K, L, Q, R classes.
T	T	low	Moderately reddish shortward of 0.75 μm; flat afterward.
V	V	moderate	Reddish shortward of 0.7 μm; extremely deep absorption longward of 0.75 μm.
—	K	moderate	Moderately steep red slope shortward of 0.75 μm; smoothly angled maximum and flat to blueish longward of 0.75 μm, with little or no curvature.
—	L, Ld	moderate	Very steep red slope shortward of 0.75 μm; flat longward of 0.75 μm; differences in peak level.
—	O	—	Peculiar trend, known so far for very few asteroids.

=== S3OS2 classification ===
The Small Solar System Objects Spectroscopic Survey (S^{3}OS^{2} or S3OS2, also known as the Lazzaro classification) observed 820 asteroids, using the former ESO 1.52-metre telescope at La Silla Observatory during 1996–2001. This survey applied both the Tholen and Bus–Binzel (SMASS) taxonomy to the observed objects, many of which had previously not been classified. For the Tholen-like classification, the survey introduced a new "Caa-type", which shows a broad absorption band associated indicating an aqueous alteration of the body's surface. The Caa class corresponds to Tholen's C-type and to the SMASS' hydrated Ch-type (including some Cgh-, Cg-, and C-types), and was assigned to 106 bodies or 13% of the surveyed objects. In addition, S3OS2 uses the K-class for both classification schemes, a type which does not exist in the original Tholen taxonomy.

=== Bus–DeMeo classification ===
The Bus-DeMeo classification is an asteroid taxonomic system designed by Francesca DeMeo, Schelte Bus and Stephen Slivan in 2009. It is based on reflectance spectrum characteristics for 371 asteroids measured over the wavelength 0.45–2.45 micrometers. This system of 24 classes introduces a new "Sv"-type and is based upon a principal component analysis, in accordance with the SMASS taxonomy, which itself is based upon the Tholen classification.

=== Tholen classification ===
The most widely used taxonomy is that of David J. Tholen, first proposed in 1984. This classification was developed from broad band spectra (between 0.31 μm and 1.06 μm) obtained during the Eight-Color Asteroid Survey (ECAS) in the 1980s, in combination with albedo measurements. The original formulation was based on 978 asteroids. The Tholen scheme includes 14 types with the majority of asteroids falling into one of three broad categories, and several smaller types (also see § Overview of Tholen and SMASS above). The types are, with their largest exemplars in parentheses:

==== C-group ====
Asteroids in the C-group are dark, carbonaceous objects. Most bodies in this group belong to the standard C-type (e.g., 10 Hygiea), and the somewhat "brighter" B-type (2 Pallas). The F-type (704 Interamnia) and G-type (1 Ceres) are much rarer. Other low-albedo classes are the D-types (624 Hektor), typically seen in the outer asteroid belt and among the Jupiter trojans, as well as the rare T-type asteroids (96 Aegle) from the inner main-belt. 101955 Bennu is B-type or F-type.

==== S-group ====
Asteroids with an S-type (15 Eunomia, 3 Juno) are siliceous (or "stony") objects. Another large group are the stony-like V-type (4 Vesta), also known as "vestoids" most common among the members of the large Vesta family, thought to have originated from a large impact crater on Vesta. Other small classes include the A-type (246 Asporina), Q-type (1862 Apollo), and R-type asteroids (349 Dembowska).

==== X-group ====
The umbrella group of X-type asteroid can be further divided into three subgroups, depending on the degree of the object's reflectivity (dark, intermediate, bright). The darkest ones are related to the C-group, with an albedo below 0.1. These are the "primitive" P-type (259 Aletheia, 190 Ismene), which differ from the "metallic" M-type (16 Psyche) with an intermediate albedo of 0.10 to 0.30, and from the bright "enstatite" E-type asteroid, mostly seen among the members of the Hungaria family in the innermost region of the asteroid belt.

==== Taxonomic features ====
The Tholen taxonomy may encompass up to four letters (e.g. "SCTU"). The classification scheme uses the letter "I" for "inconsistent" spectral data, and should not be confused with a spectral type. An example is the Themistian asteroid 515 Athalia, which, at the time of classification was inconsistent, as the body's spectrum and albedo was that of a stony and carbonaceous asteroid, respectively. When the underlying numerical color analysis was ambiguous, objects were assigned two or three types rather than just one (e.g. "CG" or "SCT"), whereby the sequence of types reflects the order of increasing numerical standard deviation, with the best fitting spectral type mentioned first. The Tholen taxonomy also has additional notations, appended to the spectral type. The letter "U" is a qualifying flag, used for asteroids with an "unusual" spectrum, that falls far from the determined cluster center in the numerical analysis. The notation ":" (single colon) and "::" (two colons) are appended when the spectral data is "noisy" or "very noisy", respectively. For example, the Mars-crosser 1747 Wright has an "AU:" class, which means that it is an A-type asteroid, though with an unusual and noisy spectrum.

=== SMASS classification ===
This is a more recent taxonomy introduced by American astronomers Schelte Bus and Richard Binzel in 2002, based on the Small Main-Belt Asteroid Spectroscopic Survey (SMASS) of 1,447 asteroids. This survey produced spectra of a far higher resolution than ECAS (see Tholen classification above), and was able to resolve a variety of narrow spectral features. However, a somewhat smaller range of wavelengths (0.44 μm to 0.92 μm) was observed. Also, albedos were not considered. Attempting to keep to the Tholen taxonomy as much as possible given the differing data, asteroids were sorted into the 26 types given below. As for the Tholen taxonomy, the majority of bodies fall into the three broad C, S, and X categories, with a few unusual bodies categorized into several smaller types (also see § Overview of Tholen and SMASS above):

- C-group of carbonaceous objects includes the C-type asteroid, the most "standard" of the non-B carbonaceous objects, the "brighter" B-type asteroid largely overlapping with the Tholen B- and F types, the Cb-type that transition between the plain C- and B-type objects, and the Cg, Ch, and Cgh-types that are somewhat related to the Tholen G-type. The "h" stands for "hydrated".
- S-group of siliceous (stony) objects includes the most common S-type asteroid, as well as the A-, Q-, and R-types. New classes include the K-type (181 Eucharis, 221 Eos) and L-type (83 Beatrix) asteroids. There are also five classes, Sa, Sq, Sr, Sk, and Sl that transition between plain the S-type and the other corresponding types in this group.
- X-group of mostly metallic objects. This includes the most common X-type asteroids as well as the M, E, or P-type as classified by Tholen. The Xe, Xc, and Xk are transitional types between the plain X- and the corresponding E, C and K classes.
- Other spectral classes include the T-, D-, and V-types (4 Vesta). The Ld-type is a new class and has more extreme spectral features than the L-type asteroid. The new class of O-type asteroids has since only been assigned to the asteroid 3628 Božněmcová.

A significant number of small asteroids were found to fall in the Q, R, and V types, which were represented by only a single body in the Tholen scheme. In the Bus and Binzel SMASS scheme only a single type was assigned to any particular asteroid.

== Color indices ==
Wavelengths

The characterization of an asteroid includes the measurement of its color indices derived from a photometric system. This is done by measuring the object's brightness through a set of different, wavelength-specific filters, so-called passbands. In the UBV photometric system, which is also used to characterize distant objects in addition to classical asteroids, the three basic filters are:

- U: passband for the ultraviolet light, (~320-380 nm, mean 364 nm)
- B: passband for the blue light, including some violet, (~395-500 nm, mean 442 nm)
- V: passband sensitive to visible light, more specifically the green-yellow portion of the visible light (~510-600 nm, mean 540 nm)

Wavelengths of the visible light
Colors	violet	blue	cyan	green	yellow	orange	red
Wavelengths	380–450 nm	450–495 nm	495–520 nm	520–570 nm	570–590 nm	590–620 nm	620–750 nm

In an observation, the brightness of an object is measured twice through a different filter. The resulting difference in magnitude is called the color index. For asteroids, the U−B or B−V color indices are the most common ones. In addition, the V−R, V−I and R−I indices, where the photometric letters stand for visible (V), red (R) and infrared (I), are also used. A photometric sequence such as V–R–B–I can be obtained from observations within a few minutes.

Mean-color indices of dynamical groups in the outer Solar System
Groups	Color index			
Groups	B−V	V−R	V−I	R−I
Plutinos	0.895±0.190	0.568±0.106	1.095±0.201	0.536±0.135
Cubewanos	0.973±0.174	0.622±0.126	1.181±0.237	0.586±0.148
Centaurs	0.886±0.213	0.573±0.127	1.104±0.245	0.548±0.150
SDOs	0.875±0.159	0.553±0.132	1.070±0.220	0.517±0.102
Comets	0.795±0.035	0.441±0.122	0.935±0.141	0.451±0.059
Jupiter trojans	0.777±0.091	0.445±0.048	0.861±0.090	0.416±0.057

== Appraisal ==
These classification schemes are expected to be refined and/or replaced as further research progresses. However, for now the spectral classification based on the two above coarse resolution spectroscopic surveys from the 1990s is still the standard. Scientists have been unable to agree on a better taxonomic system, largely due to the difficulty of obtaining detailed measurements consistently for a large sample of asteroids (e.g. finer resolution spectra, or non-spectral data such as densities would be very useful).

== Correlation with meteorite types ==
Some groupings of asteroids have been correlated with meteorite types:

- C-type – Carbonaceous chondrite meteorites
- S-type – Stony meteorites
- M-type – Iron meteorites
- V-type – HED meteorites

== See also ==
- Asteroid mining
