= Meanings of minor-planet names: 313001–314000 =

As minor planet discoveries are confirmed, they are given a permanent number by the IAU's Minor Planet Center (MPC), and the discoverers can then submit names for them, following the IAU's naming conventions. The list below concerns those minor planets in the specified number-range that have received names, and explains the meanings of those names.

Official naming citations of newly named small Solar System bodies are approved and published in a bulletin by IAU's Working Group for Small Bodies Nomenclature (WGSBN). Before May 2021, citations were published in MPC's Minor Planet Circulars for many decades. Recent citations can also be found on the JPL Small-Body Database (SBDB). Until his death in 2016, German astronomer Lutz D. Schmadel compiled these citations into the Dictionary of Minor Planet Names (DMP) and regularly updated the collection.

Based on Paul Herget's The Names of the Minor Planets, Schmadel also researched the unclear origin of numerous asteroids, most of which had been named prior to World War II. This article incorporates text from this source, which is in the public domain: SBDB New namings may only be added to this list below after official publication as the preannouncement of names is condemned. The WGSBN publishes a comprehensive guideline for the naming rules of non-cometary small Solar System bodies.

== 313001–313100 ==
Named minor planet	Provisional	This minor planet was named for...	Ref · Catalog
There are no named minor planets in this number range

== 313101–313200 ==
back to top

Named minor planet	Provisional	This minor planet was named for...	Ref · Catalog
313116 Pálvenetianer	2000 YX_{31}	Pál Venetianer (born 1935), a Hungarian molecular biologist and biochemist.	JPL · 313116

== 313201–313300 ==
back to top

Named minor planet	Provisional	This minor planet was named for...	Ref · Catalog
There are no named minor planets in this number range

== 313301–313400 ==
back to top

Named minor planet	Provisional	This minor planet was named for...	Ref · Catalog
313384 Holetschek	2002 LP_{60}	Johann Holetschek (1846–1923), Austrian astronomer who specialised in comets and their orbits, brightnesses and tails.	JPL · 313384

== 313401–313500 ==
back to top

Named minor planet	Provisional	This minor planet was named for...	Ref · Catalog
There are no named minor planets in this number range

== 313501–313600 ==
back to top

Named minor planet	Provisional	This minor planet was named for...	Ref · Catalog
There are no named minor planets in this number range

== 313601–313700 ==
back to top

Named minor planet	Provisional	This minor planet was named for...	Ref · Catalog
There are no named minor planets in this number range

== 313701–313800 ==
back to top

Named minor planet	Provisional	This minor planet was named for...	Ref · Catalog
There are no named minor planets in this number range

== 313801–313900 ==
back to top

Named minor planet	Provisional	This minor planet was named for...	Ref · Catalog
313892 Furnish	2004 JF	James F. Furnish (1950–2021) was a commercial fisherman and owner of the Hylah Ruth of Astoria, Oregon. He fished from California to Alaska, and the Columbia River for fish, crab, and a digger of razor clams. Furnish was actively involved with community government and school issues.	IAU · 313892

== 313901–314000 ==
back to top

Named minor planet	Provisional	This minor planet was named for...	Ref · Catalog
313921 Daassou	2004 RP_{1}	Ahmed Daassou (born 1981), who has been a professor at Cadi Ayyad University in Morocco	JPL · 313921

back to top

Preceded by 312,001–313,000	Meanings of minor-planet names List of minor planets: 313,001–314,000	Succeeded by 314,001–315,000
