= List of minor planets: 313001–314000 =

The following is a partial list of minor planets, running from minor-planet number 313001 through 314000, inclusive. The primary data for this and other partial lists is based on JPL's "Small-Body Orbital Elements" and data available from the Minor Planet Center. Critical list information is also provided by the MPC, unless otherwise specified from Lowell Observatory. A detailed description of the table's columns and additional sources are given on the main page including a complete list of every page in this series, and a statistical break-up on the dynamical classification of minor planets.

Also see the summary list of all named bodies in numerical and alphabetical order, and the corresponding naming citations for the number range of this particular list. New namings may only be added to this list after official publication, as the preannouncement of names is condemned by the Working Group for Small Bodies Nomenclature of the International Astronomical Union.

| Near-Earth obj. | MBA (inner) | MBA (outer) | Centaur |
| Mars-crosser | MBA (middle) | Jupiter trojan | Trans-Neptunian obj. |
| Unclassified |

== 313001–313100 ==
| Designation | | | Discovery | | | Properties | | Ref |
| Permanent | Provisional | Named after | Date | Site | Discoverer(s) | Category | Diam. | Ref |
|---|---|---|---|---|---|---|---|---|
| 313001 | 1999 UH_{17} | — | October 29, 1999 | Kitt Peak | Spacewatch | · | 1.4 km | MPC · JPL |
| 313002 | 1999 UD_{33} | — | October 31, 1999 | Kitt Peak | Spacewatch | · | 2.2 km | MPC · JPL |
| 313003 | 1999 UX_{33} | — | October 6, 1999 | Socorro | LINEAR | EOS | 2.5 km | MPC · JPL |
| 313004 | 1999 UM_{44} | — | October 29, 1999 | Anderson Mesa | LONEOS | · | 1.7 km | MPC · JPL |
| 313005 | 1999 UZ_{46} | — | October 30, 1999 | Anderson Mesa | LONEOS | · | 2.0 km | MPC · JPL |
| 313006 | 1999 VY_{14} | — | November 2, 1999 | Kitt Peak | Spacewatch | · | 3.9 km | MPC · JPL |
| 313007 | 1999 VL_{16} | — | November 2, 1999 | Kitt Peak | Spacewatch | · | 1.2 km | MPC · JPL |
| 313008 | 1999 VD_{19} | — | November 8, 1999 | Višnjan | K. Korlević | · | 2.3 km | MPC · JPL |
| 313009 | 1999 VO_{62} | — | November 4, 1999 | Socorro | LINEAR | MAS | 980 m | MPC · JPL |
| 313010 | 1999 VJ_{106} | — | November 9, 1999 | Socorro | LINEAR | EOS | 2.8 km | MPC · JPL |
| 313011 | 1999 VA_{109} | — | November 9, 1999 | Socorro | LINEAR | · | 3.7 km | MPC · JPL |
| 313012 | 1999 VC_{137} | — | November 9, 1999 | Socorro | LINEAR | · | 3.9 km | MPC · JPL |
| 313013 | 1999 VB_{139} | — | November 9, 1999 | Kitt Peak | Spacewatch | · | 1.4 km | MPC · JPL |
| 313014 | 1999 VA_{188} | — | November 15, 1999 | Socorro | LINEAR | · | 4.2 km | MPC · JPL |
| 313015 | 1999 VP_{217} | — | November 5, 1999 | Socorro | LINEAR | MAS | 970 m | MPC · JPL |
| 313016 | 1999 VD_{223} | — | November 5, 1999 | Socorro | LINEAR | · | 1.7 km | MPC · JPL |
| 313017 | 1999 WJ_{5} | — | November 28, 1999 | Kitt Peak | Spacewatch | NYS | 1.3 km | MPC · JPL |
| 313018 | 1999 WU_{10} | — | November 28, 1999 | Kitt Peak | Spacewatch | MAS | 910 m | MPC · JPL |
| 313019 | 1999 WR_{19} | — | November 16, 1999 | Kitt Peak | Spacewatch | MAS | 900 m | MPC · JPL |
| 313020 | 1999 XZ_{37} | — | December 6, 1999 | Gnosca | S. Sposetti | NYS | 1.4 km | MPC · JPL |
| 313021 | 1999 XS_{201} | — | December 12, 1999 | Socorro | LINEAR | · | 3.5 km | MPC · JPL |
| 313022 | 1999 YR_{12} | — | December 27, 1999 | Kitt Peak | Spacewatch | L4 | 8.8 km | MPC · JPL |
| 313023 | 2000 AN_{209} | — | January 5, 2000 | Kitt Peak | Spacewatch | · | 3.0 km | MPC · JPL |
| 313024 | 2000 AV_{210} | — | January 5, 2000 | Kitt Peak | Spacewatch | L4 · ERY | 11 km | MPC · JPL |
| 313025 | 2000 AT_{219} | — | January 8, 2000 | Kitt Peak | Spacewatch | · | 1.7 km | MPC · JPL |
| 313026 | 2000 CF_{45} | — | February 2, 2000 | Socorro | LINEAR | · | 1.3 km | MPC · JPL |
| 313027 | 2000 CC_{80} | — | February 8, 2000 | Kitt Peak | Spacewatch | · | 1.4 km | MPC · JPL |
| 313028 | 2000 DU_{4} | — | February 28, 2000 | Socorro | LINEAR | · | 1.5 km | MPC · JPL |
| 313029 | 2000 DP_{81} | — | February 28, 2000 | Socorro | LINEAR | · | 1.9 km | MPC · JPL |
| 313030 | 2000 DR_{96} | — | February 29, 2000 | Socorro | LINEAR | · | 1.4 km | MPC · JPL |
| 313031 | 2000 FA_{71} | — | March 29, 2000 | Kitt Peak | Spacewatch | · | 1.7 km | MPC · JPL |
| 313032 | 2000 GQ_{180} | — | April 6, 2000 | Socorro | LINEAR | · | 1.1 km | MPC · JPL |
| 313033 | 2000 JR_{4} | — | May 1, 2000 | Kitt Peak | Spacewatch | · | 2.3 km | MPC · JPL |
| 313034 | 2000 KM_{75} | — | May 27, 2000 | Socorro | LINEAR | · | 2.3 km | MPC · JPL |
| 313035 | 2000 OW_{35} | — | July 31, 2000 | Kitt Peak | Spacewatch | BRG | 2.0 km | MPC · JPL |
| 313036 | 2000 PL | — | August 2, 2000 | San Marcello | L. Tesi, M. Tombelli | · | 940 m | MPC · JPL |
| 313037 | 2000 PK_{3} | — | August 1, 2000 | Socorro | LINEAR | PHO | 1.5 km | MPC · JPL |
| 313038 | 2000 QH | — | August 21, 2000 | Prescott | P. G. Comba | · | 1.9 km | MPC · JPL |
| 313039 | 2000 QQ_{25} | — | August 26, 2000 | Socorro | LINEAR | PHO | 1.3 km | MPC · JPL |
| 313040 | 2000 QB_{60} | — | August 26, 2000 | Socorro | LINEAR | · | 660 m | MPC · JPL |
| 313041 | 2000 QN_{70} | — | August 28, 2000 | Socorro | LINEAR | PHO | 1.2 km | MPC · JPL |
| 313042 | 2000 QA_{97} | — | August 28, 2000 | Socorro | LINEAR | · | 1.3 km | MPC · JPL |
| 313043 | 2000 QE_{137} | — | August 31, 2000 | Socorro | LINEAR | H | 810 m | MPC · JPL |
| 313044 | 2000 QA_{144} | — | August 31, 2000 | Socorro | LINEAR | · | 930 m | MPC · JPL |
| 313045 | 2000 QR_{148} | — | August 26, 2000 | Socorro | LINEAR | PHO | 1.5 km | MPC · JPL |
| 313046 | 2000 QH_{150} | — | August 25, 2000 | Socorro | LINEAR | · | 1.7 km | MPC · JPL |
| 313047 | 2000 QL_{200} | — | August 29, 2000 | Socorro | LINEAR | · | 2.7 km | MPC · JPL |
| 313048 | 2000 QX_{209} | — | August 31, 2000 | Socorro | LINEAR | · | 830 m | MPC · JPL |
| 313049 | 2000 QN_{210} | — | August 31, 2000 | Socorro | LINEAR | (2076) | 850 m | MPC · JPL |
| 313050 | 2000 QE_{216} | — | August 31, 2000 | Socorro | LINEAR | V | 920 m | MPC · JPL |
| 313051 | 2000 RV_{36} | — | September 2, 2000 | Socorro | LINEAR | PHO | 1.6 km | MPC · JPL |
| 313052 | 2000 RL_{52} | — | September 2, 2000 | Kitt Peak | Spacewatch | · | 2.8 km | MPC · JPL |
| 313053 | 2000 RP_{73} | — | September 2, 2000 | Socorro | LINEAR | · | 1.3 km | MPC · JPL |
| 313054 | 2000 RU_{99} | — | September 5, 2000 | Anderson Mesa | LONEOS | H | 660 m | MPC · JPL |
| 313055 | 2000 SB_{10} | — | September 23, 2000 | Socorro | LINEAR | PHO | 1.4 km | MPC · JPL |
| 313056 | 2000 SZ_{28} | — | September 23, 2000 | Socorro | LINEAR | · | 910 m | MPC · JPL |
| 313057 | 2000 SU_{33} | — | September 24, 2000 | Socorro | LINEAR | EOS | 2.6 km | MPC · JPL |
| 313058 | 2000 SW_{36} | — | September 24, 2000 | Socorro | LINEAR | · | 3.2 km | MPC · JPL |
| 313059 | 2000 SL_{40} | — | September 24, 2000 | Socorro | LINEAR | · | 890 m | MPC · JPL |
| 313060 | 2000 SZ_{52} | — | September 24, 2000 | Socorro | LINEAR | · | 1.0 km | MPC · JPL |
| 313061 | 2000 SR_{59} | — | September 24, 2000 | Socorro | LINEAR | · | 880 m | MPC · JPL |
| 313062 | 2000 SS_{89} | — | September 29, 2000 | Emerald Lane | L. Ball | · | 1.0 km | MPC · JPL |
| 313063 | 2000 SM_{103} | — | September 24, 2000 | Socorro | LINEAR | · | 840 m | MPC · JPL |
| 313064 | 2000 SU_{133} | — | September 23, 2000 | Socorro | LINEAR | · | 1.0 km | MPC · JPL |
| 313065 | 2000 SS_{144} | — | September 24, 2000 | Socorro | LINEAR | · | 760 m | MPC · JPL |
| 313066 | 2000 ST_{154} | — | September 24, 2000 | Socorro | LINEAR | · | 1.2 km | MPC · JPL |
| 313067 | 2000 SF_{160} | — | September 27, 2000 | Socorro | LINEAR | H | 780 m | MPC · JPL |
| 313068 | 2000 SE_{164} | — | September 24, 2000 | Socorro | LINEAR | PHO | 1.1 km | MPC · JPL |
| 313069 | 2000 SZ_{177} | — | September 28, 2000 | Socorro | LINEAR | · | 1.2 km | MPC · JPL |
| 313070 | 2000 SZ_{214} | — | September 26, 2000 | Socorro | LINEAR | · | 950 m | MPC · JPL |
| 313071 | 2000 SA_{224} | — | September 27, 2000 | Socorro | LINEAR | · | 950 m | MPC · JPL |
| 313072 | 2000 SE_{233} | — | September 28, 2000 | Socorro | LINEAR | H | 560 m | MPC · JPL |
| 313073 | 2000 SZ_{235} | — | September 24, 2000 | Socorro | LINEAR | · | 1.1 km | MPC · JPL |
| 313074 | 2000 SS_{236} | — | September 24, 2000 | Socorro | LINEAR | · | 920 m | MPC · JPL |
| 313075 | 2000 SN_{240} | — | September 26, 2000 | Socorro | LINEAR | PHO | 1.1 km | MPC · JPL |
| 313076 | 2000 SU_{252} | — | September 24, 2000 | Socorro | LINEAR | · | 3.6 km | MPC · JPL |
| 313077 | 2000 SU_{319} | — | September 27, 2000 | Socorro | LINEAR | · | 2.3 km | MPC · JPL |
| 313078 | 2000 SJ_{366} | — | September 23, 2000 | Anderson Mesa | LONEOS | H | 740 m | MPC · JPL |
| 313079 | 2000 SP_{376} | — | September 23, 2000 | Socorro | LINEAR | · | 1.1 km | MPC · JPL |
| 313080 | 2000 TB_{11} | — | October 1, 2000 | Socorro | LINEAR | · | 860 m | MPC · JPL |
| 313081 | 2000 TJ_{16} | — | October 1, 2000 | Socorro | LINEAR | · | 1.1 km | MPC · JPL |
| 313082 | 2000 TR_{20} | — | September 26, 2000 | Haleakala | NEAT | V | 880 m | MPC · JPL |
| 313083 | 2000 TB_{25} | — | October 2, 2000 | Socorro | LINEAR | · | 890 m | MPC · JPL |
| 313084 | 2000 TH_{35} | — | October 6, 2000 | Anderson Mesa | LONEOS | · | 4.0 km | MPC · JPL |
| 313085 | 2000 TB_{45} | — | October 1, 2000 | Socorro | LINEAR | · | 820 m | MPC · JPL |
| 313086 | 2000 TR_{67} | — | October 2, 2000 | Socorro | LINEAR | · | 840 m | MPC · JPL |
| 313087 | 2000 UD_{12} | — | October 18, 2000 | Socorro | LINEAR | · | 960 m | MPC · JPL |
| 313088 | 2000 UQ_{21} | — | October 24, 2000 | Socorro | LINEAR | · | 930 m | MPC · JPL |
| 313089 | 2000 UP_{56} | — | September 28, 2000 | Socorro | LINEAR | NYS | 1.4 km | MPC · JPL |
| 313090 | 2000 UY_{67} | — | October 25, 2000 | Socorro | LINEAR | · | 1.3 km | MPC · JPL |
| 313091 | 2000 UM_{70} | — | October 25, 2000 | Socorro | LINEAR | · | 1.3 km | MPC · JPL |
| 313092 | 2000 UG_{73} | — | October 25, 2000 | Socorro | LINEAR | · | 1.5 km | MPC · JPL |
| 313093 | 2000 UC_{95} | — | October 25, 2000 | Socorro | LINEAR | · | 3.8 km | MPC · JPL |
| 313094 | 2000 US_{100} | — | October 25, 2000 | Socorro | LINEAR | · | 2.6 km | MPC · JPL |
| 313095 | 2000 VY_{1} | — | November 1, 2000 | Socorro | LINEAR | H | 780 m | MPC · JPL |
| 313096 | 2000 VL_{10} | — | November 1, 2000 | Socorro | LINEAR | · | 1.0 km | MPC · JPL |
| 313097 | 2000 VR_{40} | — | November 1, 2000 | Socorro | LINEAR | · | 1.0 km | MPC · JPL |
| 313098 | 2000 VR_{64} | — | November 1, 2000 | Socorro | LINEAR | · | 1.3 km | MPC · JPL |
| 313099 | 2000 WO_{29} | — | November 21, 2000 | Socorro | LINEAR | H | 630 m | MPC · JPL |
| 313100 | 2000 WS_{46} | — | November 21, 2000 | Socorro | LINEAR | fast | 2.6 km | MPC · JPL |

== 313101–313200 ==
back to top

| Designation | | | Discovery | | | Properties | | Ref |
| Permanent | Provisional | Named after | Date | Site | Discoverer(s) | Category | Diam. | Ref |
|---|---|---|---|---|---|---|---|---|
| 313101 | 2000 WC_{70} | — | November 19, 2000 | Socorro | LINEAR | · | 2.4 km | MPC · JPL |
| 313102 | 2000 WQ_{70} | — | November 19, 2000 | Socorro | LINEAR | · | 1.2 km | MPC · JPL |
| 313103 | 2000 WD_{76} | — | November 20, 2000 | Socorro | LINEAR | NYS | 1.1 km | MPC · JPL |
| 313104 | 2000 WE_{76} | — | November 20, 2000 | Socorro | LINEAR | · | 870 m | MPC · JPL |
| 313105 | 2000 WQ_{89} | — | November 21, 2000 | Socorro | LINEAR | · | 1.3 km | MPC · JPL |
| 313106 | 2000 WT_{96} | — | November 21, 2000 | Socorro | LINEAR | · | 1.6 km | MPC · JPL |
| 313107 | 2000 WF_{151} | — | November 29, 2000 | Socorro | LINEAR | H | 800 m | MPC · JPL |
| 313108 | 2000 WY_{152} | — | November 29, 2000 | Socorro | LINEAR | · | 1.3 km | MPC · JPL |
| 313109 | 2000 WP_{176} | — | November 26, 2000 | Kitt Peak | Spacewatch | · | 2.6 km | MPC · JPL |
| 313110 | 2000 XC_{6} | — | December 1, 2000 | Socorro | LINEAR | · | 4.3 km | MPC · JPL |
| 313111 | 2000 XF_{9} | — | December 1, 2000 | Socorro | LINEAR | PHO | 1.8 km | MPC · JPL |
| 313112 | 2000 XG_{44} | — | December 5, 2000 | Socorro | LINEAR | H | 690 m | MPC · JPL |
| 313113 | 2000 XP_{44} | — | December 6, 2000 | Bohyunsan | Jeon, Y.-B., Lee, B.-C. | · | 1.1 km | MPC · JPL |
| 313114 | 2000 YV_{15} | — | December 22, 2000 | Anderson Mesa | LONEOS | · | 1.3 km | MPC · JPL |
| 313115 | 2000 YL_{17} | — | December 28, 2000 | Fountain Hills | C. W. Juels | · | 3.6 km | MPC · JPL |
| 313116 Pálvenetianer | 2000 YX_{31} | Pálvenetianer | December 31, 2000 | Piszkéstető | K. Sárneczky, L. Kiss | MAS | 710 m | MPC · JPL |
| 313117 | 2000 YE_{40} | — | December 30, 2000 | Socorro | LINEAR | · | 1.4 km | MPC · JPL |
| 313118 | 2000 YY_{106} | — | December 30, 2000 | Socorro | LINEAR | · | 4.6 km | MPC · JPL |
| 313119 | 2000 YP_{114} | — | December 30, 2000 | Socorro | LINEAR | · | 6.6 km | MPC · JPL |
| 313120 | 2000 YF_{123} | — | December 28, 2000 | Kitt Peak | Spacewatch | · | 1.2 km | MPC · JPL |
| 313121 | 2000 YV_{123} | — | December 28, 2000 | Kitt Peak | Spacewatch | · | 4.0 km | MPC · JPL |
| 313122 | 2000 YU_{137} | — | December 29, 2000 | Fair Oaks Ranch | J. V. McClusky | H | 870 m | MPC · JPL |
| 313123 | 2001 AK_{2} | — | January 2, 2001 | Socorro | LINEAR | H | 950 m | MPC · JPL |
| 313124 | 2001 AL_{2} | — | January 2, 2001 | Socorro | LINEAR | H | 760 m | MPC · JPL |
| 313125 | 2001 AQ_{6} | — | January 2, 2001 | Socorro | LINEAR | · | 1.6 km | MPC · JPL |
| 313126 | 2001 AL_{46} | — | January 15, 2001 | Socorro | LINEAR | PHO | 1.6 km | MPC · JPL |
| 313127 | 2001 AD_{47} | — | January 15, 2001 | Socorro | LINEAR | PHO | 1.5 km | MPC · JPL |
| 313128 | 2001 BB_{1} | — | January 16, 2001 | Haleakala | NEAT | H | 790 m | MPC · JPL |
| 313129 | 2001 BG_{2} | — | January 18, 2001 | Kitt Peak | Spacewatch | PHO | 2.0 km | MPC · JPL |
| 313130 | 2001 BN_{3} | — | January 18, 2001 | Socorro | LINEAR | · | 3.4 km | MPC · JPL |
| 313131 | 2001 BT_{6} | — | January 19, 2001 | Socorro | LINEAR | · | 3.9 km | MPC · JPL |
| 313132 | 2001 BF_{56} | — | January 19, 2001 | Socorro | LINEAR | · | 1.8 km | MPC · JPL |
| 313133 | 2001 BA_{74} | — | January 30, 2001 | Socorro | LINEAR | · | 2.4 km | MPC · JPL |
| 313134 | 2001 BJ_{83} | — | January 18, 2001 | Socorro | LINEAR | · | 3.8 km | MPC · JPL |
| 313135 | 2001 CW_{5} | — | February 1, 2001 | Socorro | LINEAR | MAS | 1.0 km | MPC · JPL |
| 313136 | 2001 CX_{9} | — | February 2, 2001 | Socorro | LINEAR | H | 720 m | MPC · JPL |
| 313137 | 2001 CE_{11} | — | February 1, 2001 | Socorro | LINEAR | · | 4.8 km | MPC · JPL |
| 313138 | 2001 CV_{18} | — | February 2, 2001 | Socorro | LINEAR | · | 5.6 km | MPC · JPL |
| 313139 | 2001 CZ_{24} | — | February 1, 2001 | Socorro | LINEAR | · | 2.9 km | MPC · JPL |
| 313140 | 2001 CE_{27} | — | February 2, 2001 | Anderson Mesa | LONEOS | · | 3.7 km | MPC · JPL |
| 313141 | 2001 CK_{31} | — | February 12, 2001 | Oaxaca | Roe, J. M. | · | 3.2 km | MPC · JPL |
| 313142 | 2001 DM_{2} | — | February 16, 2001 | Kitt Peak | Spacewatch | L4 | 11 km | MPC · JPL |
| 313143 | 2001 DT_{5} | — | February 16, 2001 | Socorro | LINEAR | · | 4.9 km | MPC · JPL |
| 313144 | 2001 DZ_{7} | — | February 16, 2001 | Kitt Peak | Spacewatch | · | 1.6 km | MPC · JPL |
| 313145 | 2001 DA_{9} | — | February 17, 2001 | Socorro | LINEAR | H | 840 m | MPC · JPL |
| 313146 | 2001 DH_{13} | — | February 19, 2001 | Oizumi | T. Kobayashi | H | 870 m | MPC · JPL |
| 313147 | 2001 DY_{13} | — | February 2, 2001 | Socorro | LINEAR | · | 4.1 km | MPC · JPL |
| 313148 | 2001 DU_{14} | — | February 16, 2001 | Desert Beaver | W. K. Y. Yeung | · | 4.5 km | MPC · JPL |
| 313149 | 2001 DW_{17} | — | February 16, 2001 | Socorro | LINEAR | · | 4.7 km | MPC · JPL |
| 313150 | 2001 DG_{18} | — | February 16, 2001 | Socorro | LINEAR | H | 820 m | MPC · JPL |
| 313151 | 2001 DZ_{42} | — | February 19, 2001 | Socorro | LINEAR | MAS | 1.0 km | MPC · JPL |
| 313152 | 2001 DU_{54} | — | February 16, 2001 | Kitt Peak | Spacewatch | · | 3.8 km | MPC · JPL |
| 313153 | 2001 DX_{54} | — | February 16, 2001 | Kitt Peak | Spacewatch | NYS | 1.2 km | MPC · JPL |
| 313154 | 2001 DY_{58} | — | February 21, 2001 | Socorro | LINEAR | · | 6.4 km | MPC · JPL |
| 313155 | 2001 DB_{62} | — | February 19, 2001 | Socorro | LINEAR | · | 5.5 km | MPC · JPL |
| 313156 | 2001 DS_{72} | — | February 19, 2001 | Socorro | LINEAR | · | 3.5 km | MPC · JPL |
| 313157 | 2001 DB_{73} | — | February 19, 2001 | Socorro | LINEAR | EUP | 4.1 km | MPC · JPL |
| 313158 | 2001 DD_{83} | — | February 22, 2001 | Kitt Peak | Spacewatch | · | 3.3 km | MPC · JPL |
| 313159 | 2001 DZ_{101} | — | February 16, 2001 | Socorro | LINEAR | · | 1.5 km | MPC · JPL |
| 313160 | 2001 DF_{103} | — | February 16, 2001 | Socorro | LINEAR | · | 4.1 km | MPC · JPL |
| 313161 | 2001 EE_{17} | — | March 14, 2001 | Socorro | LINEAR | EUP | 5.2 km | MPC · JPL |
| 313162 | 2001 FS | — | March 16, 2001 | Socorro | LINEAR | · | 1.9 km | MPC · JPL |
| 313163 | 2001 FX_{15} | — | March 19, 2001 | Anderson Mesa | LONEOS | · | 4.1 km | MPC · JPL |
| 313164 | 2001 FB_{29} | — | March 19, 2001 | Socorro | LINEAR | EUP | 4.4 km | MPC · JPL |
| 313165 | 2001 FC_{65} | — | March 19, 2001 | Socorro | LINEAR | ERI | 1.5 km | MPC · JPL |
| 313166 | 2001 FW_{66} | — | March 19, 2001 | Socorro | LINEAR | · | 4.8 km | MPC · JPL |
| 313167 | 2001 FT_{83} | — | March 26, 2001 | Kitt Peak | Spacewatch | · | 1.2 km | MPC · JPL |
| 313168 | 2001 FU_{136} | — | March 21, 2001 | Anderson Mesa | LONEOS | · | 3.3 km | MPC · JPL |
| 313169 | 2001 FU_{171} | — | March 24, 2001 | Haleakala | NEAT | T_{j} (2.98) | 5.7 km | MPC · JPL |
| 313170 | 2001 FC_{187} | — | March 19, 2001 | Anderson Mesa | LONEOS | · | 5.1 km | MPC · JPL |
| 313171 | 2001 HF_{68} | — | April 27, 2001 | Socorro | LINEAR | T_{j} (2.98) | 4.6 km | MPC · JPL |
| 313172 | 2001 KQ_{23} | — | May 17, 2001 | Socorro | LINEAR | · | 2.1 km | MPC · JPL |
| 313173 | 2001 ME_{6} | — | June 20, 2001 | Palomar | NEAT | EUN | 2.0 km | MPC · JPL |
| 313174 | 2001 MV_{11} | — | June 21, 2001 | Palomar | NEAT | KON | 3.0 km | MPC · JPL |
| 313175 | 2001 MB_{15} | — | June 28, 2001 | Anderson Mesa | LONEOS | · | 1.9 km | MPC · JPL |
| 313176 | 2001 MH_{22} | — | June 29, 2001 | Haleakala | NEAT | EUN | 1.6 km | MPC · JPL |
| 313177 | 2001 OB_{3} | — | July 19, 2001 | Reedy Creek | J. Broughton | · | 2.1 km | MPC · JPL |
| 313178 | 2001 OY_{43} | — | July 23, 2001 | Palomar | NEAT | · | 2.2 km | MPC · JPL |
| 313179 | 2001 OK_{44} | — | July 23, 2001 | Palomar | NEAT | · | 2.8 km | MPC · JPL |
| 313180 | 2001 OA_{69} | — | July 17, 2001 | Haleakala | NEAT | · | 1.5 km | MPC · JPL |
| 313181 | 2001 OD_{74} | — | July 26, 2001 | Palomar | NEAT | · | 880 m | MPC · JPL |
| 313182 | 2001 ON_{86} | — | July 28, 2001 | Haleakala | NEAT | · | 1.9 km | MPC · JPL |
| 313183 | 2001 OU_{107} | — | July 30, 2001 | Socorro | LINEAR | · | 1.8 km | MPC · JPL |
| 313184 | 2001 PZ_{5} | — | August 10, 2001 | Haleakala | NEAT | · | 1.9 km | MPC · JPL |
| 313185 | 2001 PC_{24} | — | August 11, 2001 | Haleakala | NEAT | · | 1.5 km | MPC · JPL |
| 313186 | 2001 PV_{30} | — | August 10, 2001 | Palomar | NEAT | · | 1.9 km | MPC · JPL |
| 313187 | 2001 QK_{2} | — | August 17, 2001 | Reedy Creek | J. Broughton | EUN | 2.2 km | MPC · JPL |
| 313188 | 2001 QG_{44} | — | August 16, 2001 | Socorro | LINEAR | EUN · slow | 1.8 km | MPC · JPL |
| 313189 | 2001 QR_{91} | — | August 19, 2001 | Socorro | LINEAR | · | 1.6 km | MPC · JPL |
| 313190 | 2001 QA_{92} | — | August 19, 2001 | Socorro | LINEAR | · | 2.5 km | MPC · JPL |
| 313191 | 2001 QE_{103} | — | August 19, 2001 | Socorro | LINEAR | · | 1.9 km | MPC · JPL |
| 313192 | 2001 QT_{113} | — | August 25, 2001 | Ondřejov | P. Kušnirák, P. Pravec | · | 2.3 km | MPC · JPL |
| 313193 | 2001 QO_{115} | — | August 17, 2001 | Socorro | LINEAR | · | 3.1 km | MPC · JPL |
| 313194 | 2001 QR_{115} | — | August 17, 2001 | Socorro | LINEAR | · | 2.6 km | MPC · JPL |
| 313195 | 2001 QH_{158} | — | August 23, 2001 | Anderson Mesa | LONEOS | · | 2.7 km | MPC · JPL |
| 313196 | 2001 QK_{173} | — | August 25, 2001 | Socorro | LINEAR | MAR | 1.3 km | MPC · JPL |
| 313197 | 2001 QU_{187} | — | August 21, 2001 | Haleakala | NEAT | 526 | 3.5 km | MPC · JPL |
| 313198 | 2001 QV_{202} | — | August 23, 2001 | Anderson Mesa | LONEOS | ADE | 2.4 km | MPC · JPL |
| 313199 | 2001 QV_{206} | — | August 23, 2001 | Anderson Mesa | LONEOS | · | 2.4 km | MPC · JPL |
| 313200 | 2001 QH_{217} | — | August 23, 2001 | Anderson Mesa | LONEOS | EUN | 1.3 km | MPC · JPL |

== 313201–313300 ==
back to top

| Designation | | | Discovery | | | Properties | | Ref |
| Permanent | Provisional | Named after | Date | Site | Discoverer(s) | Category | Diam. | Ref |
|---|---|---|---|---|---|---|---|---|
| 313201 | 2001 QU_{230} | — | August 24, 2001 | Anderson Mesa | LONEOS | · | 1.8 km | MPC · JPL |
| 313202 | 2001 RV | — | September 7, 2001 | Goodricke-Pigott | R. A. Tucker | ADE | 2.8 km | MPC · JPL |
| 313203 | 2001 RC_{7} | — | September 10, 2001 | Desert Eagle | W. K. Y. Yeung | · | 2.5 km | MPC · JPL |
| 313204 | 2001 RW_{49} | — | September 10, 2001 | Socorro | LINEAR | · | 2.3 km | MPC · JPL |
| 313205 | 2001 RU_{50} | — | September 11, 2001 | Socorro | LINEAR | · | 2.3 km | MPC · JPL |
| 313206 | 2001 RS_{52} | — | September 12, 2001 | Socorro | LINEAR | T_{j} (2.99) · 3:2 | 5.8 km | MPC · JPL |
| 313207 | 2001 RW_{82} | — | September 11, 2001 | Anderson Mesa | LONEOS | · | 1.8 km | MPC · JPL |
| 313208 | 2001 RR_{96} | — | September 12, 2001 | Kitt Peak | Spacewatch | MAR | 1.4 km | MPC · JPL |
| 313209 | 2001 RT_{152} | — | September 11, 2001 | Anderson Mesa | LONEOS | · | 2.7 km | MPC · JPL |
| 313210 | 2001 SW_{1} | — | September 17, 2001 | Desert Eagle | W. K. Y. Yeung | · | 930 m | MPC · JPL |
| 313211 | 2001 SM_{41} | — | September 16, 2001 | Socorro | LINEAR | · | 2.6 km | MPC · JPL |
| 313212 | 2001 SY_{98} | — | September 20, 2001 | Socorro | LINEAR | · | 2.6 km | MPC · JPL |
| 313213 | 2001 SD_{137} | — | September 16, 2001 | Socorro | LINEAR | NEM | 2.2 km | MPC · JPL |
| 313214 | 2001 SX_{143} | — | September 16, 2001 | Socorro | LINEAR | · | 2.1 km | MPC · JPL |
| 313215 | 2001 SB_{193} | — | September 19, 2001 | Socorro | LINEAR | 3:2 | 5.1 km | MPC · JPL |
| 313216 | 2001 SA_{222} | — | September 19, 2001 | Socorro | LINEAR | (13314) | 2.0 km | MPC · JPL |
| 313217 | 2001 SH_{233} | — | September 19, 2001 | Socorro | LINEAR | · | 2.3 km | MPC · JPL |
| 313218 | 2001 SF_{250} | — | September 19, 2001 | Socorro | LINEAR | · | 2.6 km | MPC · JPL |
| 313219 | 2001 SU_{271} | — | September 20, 2001 | Socorro | LINEAR | · | 2.1 km | MPC · JPL |
| 313220 | 2001 SC_{284} | — | September 22, 2001 | Kitt Peak | Spacewatch | 3:2 | 5.5 km | MPC · JPL |
| 313221 | 2001 SS_{306} | — | September 20, 2001 | Socorro | LINEAR | · | 1.5 km | MPC · JPL |
| 313222 | 2001 SF_{338} | — | September 20, 2001 | Socorro | LINEAR | · | 1.9 km | MPC · JPL |
| 313223 | 2001 SZ_{341} | — | September 21, 2001 | Palomar | NEAT | · | 2.3 km | MPC · JPL |
| 313224 | 2001 SK_{344} | — | August 17, 2001 | Socorro | LINEAR | GEF | 1.3 km | MPC · JPL |
| 313225 | 2001 TG_{60} | — | October 13, 2001 | Socorro | LINEAR | · | 3.6 km | MPC · JPL |
| 313226 | 2001 TY_{82} | — | October 14, 2001 | Socorro | LINEAR | · | 2.2 km | MPC · JPL |
| 313227 | 2001 TW_{108} | — | October 14, 2001 | Socorro | LINEAR | · | 2.5 km | MPC · JPL |
| 313228 | 2001 TM_{121} | — | October 15, 2001 | Socorro | LINEAR | · | 2.8 km | MPC · JPL |
| 313229 | 2001 TJ_{152} | — | October 10, 2001 | Palomar | NEAT | · | 800 m | MPC · JPL |
| 313230 | 2001 TJ_{189} | — | October 14, 2001 | Socorro | LINEAR | · | 3.0 km | MPC · JPL |
| 313231 | 2001 TN_{203} | — | October 11, 2001 | Socorro | LINEAR | EUN | 2.0 km | MPC · JPL |
| 313232 | 2001 TL_{211} | — | October 13, 2001 | Palomar | NEAT | · | 2.5 km | MPC · JPL |
| 313233 | 2001 TG_{236} | — | October 15, 2001 | Palomar | NEAT | · | 2.5 km | MPC · JPL |
| 313234 | 2001 TD_{241} | — | October 15, 2001 | Kitt Peak | Spacewatch | · | 920 m | MPC · JPL |
| 313235 | 2001 TN_{244} | — | October 14, 2001 | Apache Point | SDSS | NEM | 2.0 km | MPC · JPL |
| 313236 | 2001 TB_{259} | — | October 10, 2001 | Palomar | NEAT | NEM | 2.2 km | MPC · JPL |
| 313237 | 2001 TJ_{260} | — | October 14, 2001 | Apache Point | SDSS | · | 1.8 km | MPC · JPL |
| 313238 | 2001 UF_{9} | — | October 17, 2001 | Socorro | LINEAR | · | 2.5 km | MPC · JPL |
| 313239 | 2001 UY_{30} | — | October 16, 2001 | Socorro | LINEAR | · | 3.0 km | MPC · JPL |
| 313240 | 2001 US_{37} | — | October 17, 2001 | Socorro | LINEAR | · | 1.8 km | MPC · JPL |
| 313241 | 2001 UC_{46} | — | October 17, 2001 | Socorro | LINEAR | (18466) | 3.4 km | MPC · JPL |
| 313242 | 2001 UM_{67} | — | October 20, 2001 | Socorro | LINEAR | · | 1.1 km | MPC · JPL |
| 313243 | 2001 UZ_{72} | — | October 16, 2001 | Socorro | LINEAR | DOR | 2.7 km | MPC · JPL |
| 313244 | 2001 UW_{88} | — | October 16, 2001 | Palomar | NEAT | DOR | 2.9 km | MPC · JPL |
| 313245 | 2001 UH_{98} | — | October 17, 2001 | Socorro | LINEAR | DOR | 2.3 km | MPC · JPL |
| 313246 | 2001 UN_{138} | — | October 15, 2001 | Kitt Peak | Spacewatch | · | 2.1 km | MPC · JPL |
| 313247 | 2001 UO_{138} | — | October 23, 2001 | Socorro | LINEAR | · | 1.8 km | MPC · JPL |
| 313248 | 2001 UR_{144} | — | October 23, 2001 | Socorro | LINEAR | · | 2.5 km | MPC · JPL |
| 313249 | 2001 UC_{202} | — | October 21, 2001 | Socorro | LINEAR | · | 2.1 km | MPC · JPL |
| 313250 | 2001 UQ_{202} | — | October 19, 2001 | Palomar | NEAT | · | 2.0 km | MPC · JPL |
| 313251 | 2001 UE_{224} | — | October 26, 2001 | Palomar | NEAT | · | 2.7 km | MPC · JPL |
| 313252 | 2001 VS_{28} | — | November 9, 2001 | Socorro | LINEAR | · | 960 m | MPC · JPL |
| 313253 | 2001 VS_{89} | — | November 12, 2001 | Socorro | LINEAR | · | 670 m | MPC · JPL |
| 313254 | 2001 VP_{101} | — | November 12, 2001 | Socorro | LINEAR | · | 770 m | MPC · JPL |
| 313255 | 2001 VM_{106} | — | November 12, 2001 | Socorro | LINEAR | · | 2.0 km | MPC · JPL |
| 313256 | 2001 VX_{126} | — | November 11, 2001 | Apache Point | SDSS | · | 2.2 km | MPC · JPL |
| 313257 | 2001 VJ_{133} | — | November 11, 2001 | Apache Point | SDSS | · | 1.8 km | MPC · JPL |
| 313258 | 2001 WK_{18} | — | November 17, 2001 | Socorro | LINEAR | · | 640 m | MPC · JPL |
| 313259 | 2001 WX_{61} | — | November 19, 2001 | Socorro | LINEAR | · | 2.2 km | MPC · JPL |
| 313260 | 2001 WZ_{90} | — | November 21, 2001 | Socorro | LINEAR | · | 760 m | MPC · JPL |
| 313261 | 2001 XP_{12} | — | December 9, 2001 | Socorro | LINEAR | DOR | 3.1 km | MPC · JPL |
| 313262 | 2001 XF_{33} | — | December 10, 2001 | Kitt Peak | Spacewatch | · | 1.2 km | MPC · JPL |
| 313263 | 2001 XD_{69} | — | December 11, 2001 | Socorro | LINEAR | GEF | 1.8 km | MPC · JPL |
| 313264 | 2001 XK_{123} | — | December 14, 2001 | Socorro | LINEAR | · | 920 m | MPC · JPL |
| 313265 | 2001 XC_{125} | — | December 14, 2001 | Socorro | LINEAR | · | 2.5 km | MPC · JPL |
| 313266 | 2001 XG_{174} | — | December 14, 2001 | Socorro | LINEAR | · | 720 m | MPC · JPL |
| 313267 | 2001 XN_{218} | — | December 15, 2001 | Socorro | LINEAR | WAT | 3.1 km | MPC · JPL |
| 313268 | 2001 XR_{236} | — | December 15, 2001 | Socorro | LINEAR | · | 820 m | MPC · JPL |
| 313269 | 2001 YF | — | December 17, 2001 | Palomar | NEAT | · | 3.3 km | MPC · JPL |
| 313270 | 2001 YL_{12} | — | December 17, 2001 | Socorro | LINEAR | · | 840 m | MPC · JPL |
| 313271 | 2001 YF_{63} | — | December 18, 2001 | Socorro | LINEAR | · | 800 m | MPC · JPL |
| 313272 | 2001 YM_{87} | — | December 18, 2001 | Socorro | LINEAR | · | 4.8 km | MPC · JPL |
| 313273 | 2001 YY_{94} | — | December 17, 2001 | Palomar | NEAT | EOS | 2.5 km | MPC · JPL |
| 313274 | 2001 YW_{154} | — | December 19, 2001 | Palomar | NEAT | · | 2.9 km | MPC · JPL |
| 313275 | 2001 YJ_{162} | — | December 19, 2001 | Palomar | NEAT | · | 2.9 km | MPC · JPL |
| 313276 | 2002 AX_{1} | — | January 6, 2002 | Socorro | LINEAR | ATE · slow | 380 m | MPC · JPL |
| 313277 | 2002 AN_{24} | — | January 8, 2002 | Palomar | NEAT | · | 2.6 km | MPC · JPL |
| 313278 | 2002 AL_{34} | — | January 12, 2002 | Kitt Peak | Spacewatch | · | 4.6 km | MPC · JPL |
| 313279 | 2002 AF_{110} | — | January 9, 2002 | Socorro | LINEAR | · | 880 m | MPC · JPL |
| 313280 | 2002 AK_{112} | — | January 9, 2002 | Socorro | LINEAR | · | 970 m | MPC · JPL |
| 313281 | 2002 AR_{170} | — | January 14, 2002 | Socorro | LINEAR | · | 1.9 km | MPC · JPL |
| 313282 | 2002 AB_{192} | — | January 12, 2002 | Kitt Peak | Spacewatch | · | 1.1 km | MPC · JPL |
| 313283 | 2002 AR_{206} | — | January 13, 2002 | Apache Point | SDSS | · | 3.4 km | MPC · JPL |
| 313284 | 2002 CO_{4} | — | February 7, 2002 | Socorro | LINEAR | · | 980 m | MPC · JPL |
| 313285 | 2002 CY_{19} | — | February 4, 2002 | Palomar | NEAT | · | 880 m | MPC · JPL |
| 313286 | 2002 CA_{27} | — | February 6, 2002 | Socorro | LINEAR | · | 3.8 km | MPC · JPL |
| 313287 | 2002 CL_{28} | — | February 6, 2002 | Socorro | LINEAR | · | 2.5 km | MPC · JPL |
| 313288 | 2002 CA_{34} | — | February 6, 2002 | Socorro | LINEAR | · | 2.2 km | MPC · JPL |
| 313289 | 2002 CX_{70} | — | February 7, 2002 | Socorro | LINEAR | · | 670 m | MPC · JPL |
| 313290 | 2002 CE_{90} | — | February 7, 2002 | Socorro | LINEAR | · | 990 m | MPC · JPL |
| 313291 | 2002 CB_{116} | — | February 14, 2002 | Haleakala | NEAT | H | 600 m | MPC · JPL |
| 313292 | 2002 CN_{119} | — | February 7, 2002 | Socorro | LINEAR | · | 860 m | MPC · JPL |
| 313293 | 2002 CU_{126} | — | February 7, 2002 | Socorro | LINEAR | · | 2.9 km | MPC · JPL |
| 313294 | 2002 CG_{139} | — | February 8, 2002 | Socorro | LINEAR | · | 2.7 km | MPC · JPL |
| 313295 | 2002 CY_{147} | — | February 10, 2002 | Socorro | LINEAR | · | 670 m | MPC · JPL |
| 313296 | 2002 CO_{161} | — | February 8, 2002 | Socorro | LINEAR | · | 3.0 km | MPC · JPL |
| 313297 | 2002 CT_{181} | — | February 10, 2002 | Socorro | LINEAR | NAE | 3.6 km | MPC · JPL |
| 313298 | 2002 CD_{201} | — | February 10, 2002 | Socorro | LINEAR | EOS | 4.4 km | MPC · JPL |
| 313299 | 2002 CM_{201} | — | February 10, 2002 | Socorro | LINEAR | · | 670 m | MPC · JPL |
| 313300 | 2002 CL_{209} | — | February 10, 2002 | Socorro | LINEAR | · | 3.4 km | MPC · JPL |

== 313301–313400 ==
back to top

| Designation | | | Discovery | | | Properties | | Ref |
| Permanent | Provisional | Named after | Date | Site | Discoverer(s) | Category | Diam. | Ref |
|---|---|---|---|---|---|---|---|---|
| 313301 | 2002 CS_{248} | — | February 14, 2002 | Haleakala | NEAT | · | 3.3 km | MPC · JPL |
| 313302 | 2002 CQ_{252} | — | February 4, 2002 | Palomar | NEAT | EOS | 2.4 km | MPC · JPL |
| 313303 | 2002 CU_{269} | — | February 7, 2002 | Kitt Peak | Spacewatch | L4 | 13 km | MPC · JPL |
| 313304 | 2002 CJ_{291} | — | February 10, 2002 | Socorro | LINEAR | · | 1.2 km | MPC · JPL |
| 313305 | 2002 CU_{305} | — | February 3, 2002 | Palomar | NEAT | · | 990 m | MPC · JPL |
| 313306 | 2002 CS_{306} | — | February 7, 2002 | Socorro | LINEAR | · | 4.6 km | MPC · JPL |
| 313307 | 2002 CQ_{310} | — | February 7, 2002 | Palomar | NEAT | · | 730 m | MPC · JPL |
| 313308 | 2002 DF_{18} | — | February 20, 2002 | Socorro | LINEAR | · | 1.0 km | MPC · JPL |
| 313309 | 2002 EH_{8} | — | March 12, 2002 | Kitt Peak | Spacewatch | · | 880 m | MPC · JPL |
| 313310 | 2002 EW_{10} | — | March 14, 2002 | Socorro | LINEAR | · | 2.1 km | MPC · JPL |
| 313311 | 2002 EG_{21} | — | March 10, 2002 | Palomar | NEAT | · | 2.5 km | MPC · JPL |
| 313312 | 2002 EL_{38} | — | March 12, 2002 | Kitt Peak | Spacewatch | · | 650 m | MPC · JPL |
| 313313 | 2002 EW_{39} | — | March 9, 2002 | Socorro | LINEAR | · | 620 m | MPC · JPL |
| 313314 | 2002 EM_{43} | — | March 12, 2002 | Socorro | LINEAR | · | 2.8 km | MPC · JPL |
| 313315 | 2002 EX_{49} | — | March 12, 2002 | Palomar | NEAT | · | 630 m | MPC · JPL |
| 313316 | 2002 EZ_{53} | — | March 13, 2002 | Socorro | LINEAR | · | 2.2 km | MPC · JPL |
| 313317 | 2002 EC_{63} | — | March 13, 2002 | Socorro | LINEAR | · | 960 m | MPC · JPL |
| 313318 | 2002 EY_{64} | — | March 13, 2002 | Socorro | LINEAR | · | 820 m | MPC · JPL |
| 313319 | 2002 EW_{80} | — | March 13, 2002 | Palomar | NEAT | · | 2.6 km | MPC · JPL |
| 313320 | 2002 ET_{120} | — | March 11, 2002 | Kitt Peak | Spacewatch | · | 2.8 km | MPC · JPL |
| 313321 | 2002 EA_{124} | — | March 12, 2002 | Kitt Peak | Spacewatch | · | 660 m | MPC · JPL |
| 313322 | 2002 EC_{144} | — | March 13, 2002 | Kitt Peak | Spacewatch | · | 2.4 km | MPC · JPL |
| 313323 | 2002 EJ_{152} | — | March 15, 2002 | Palomar | NEAT | L4 | 10 km | MPC · JPL |
| 313324 | 2002 EQ_{158} | — | March 5, 2002 | Apache Point | SDSS | · | 1.5 km | MPC · JPL |
| 313325 | 2002 EF_{162} | — | March 13, 2002 | Kitt Peak | Spacewatch | · | 3.1 km | MPC · JPL |
| 313326 | 2002 EJ_{162} | — | March 15, 2002 | Palomar | NEAT | V | 570 m | MPC · JPL |
| 313327 | 2002 ET_{162} | — | March 13, 2002 | Palomar | NEAT | · | 890 m | MPC · JPL |
| 313328 | 2002 FE_{4} | — | March 20, 2002 | Desert Eagle | W. K. Y. Yeung | · | 790 m | MPC · JPL |
| 313329 | 2002 FH_{5} | — | March 20, 2002 | Socorro | LINEAR | · | 1.1 km | MPC · JPL |
| 313330 | 2002 FY_{15} | — | March 16, 2002 | Haleakala | NEAT | · | 3.2 km | MPC · JPL |
| 313331 | 2002 FR_{24} | — | March 19, 2002 | Anderson Mesa | LONEOS | EOS | 2.7 km | MPC · JPL |
| 313332 | 2002 FA_{36} | — | March 21, 2002 | Socorro | LINEAR | · | 4.3 km | MPC · JPL |
| 313333 | 2002 FU_{41} | — | March 19, 2002 | Haleakala | NEAT | · | 3.9 km | MPC · JPL |
| 313334 | 2002 GA_{2} | — | April 4, 2002 | Socorro | LINEAR | · | 2.9 km | MPC · JPL |
| 313335 | 2002 GJ_{4} | — | April 9, 2002 | Socorro | LINEAR | H | 700 m | MPC · JPL |
| 313336 | 2002 GC_{26} | — | April 12, 2002 | Palomar | NEAT | PHO | 2.4 km | MPC · JPL |
| 313337 | 2002 GN_{35} | — | March 17, 2002 | Kitt Peak | Spacewatch | MAS | 800 m | MPC · JPL |
| 313338 | 2002 GJ_{38} | — | April 2, 2002 | Kitt Peak | Spacewatch | · | 930 m | MPC · JPL |
| 313339 | 2002 GE_{45} | — | April 4, 2002 | Palomar | NEAT | · | 2.6 km | MPC · JPL |
| 313340 | 2002 GZ_{45} | — | April 4, 2002 | Palomar | NEAT | · | 3.3 km | MPC · JPL |
| 313341 | 2002 GE_{49} | — | April 4, 2002 | Palomar | NEAT | · | 930 m | MPC · JPL |
| 313342 | 2002 GH_{69} | — | April 8, 2002 | Palomar | NEAT | · | 720 m | MPC · JPL |
| 313343 | 2002 GG_{73} | — | April 9, 2002 | Anderson Mesa | LONEOS | · | 4.7 km | MPC · JPL |
| 313344 | 2002 GZ_{92} | — | April 9, 2002 | Socorro | LINEAR | · | 2.9 km | MPC · JPL |
| 313345 | 2002 GT_{100} | — | April 10, 2002 | Socorro | LINEAR | EOS | 3.0 km | MPC · JPL |
| 313346 | 2002 GM_{108} | — | April 11, 2002 | Palomar | NEAT | · | 780 m | MPC · JPL |
| 313347 | 2002 GU_{109} | — | April 11, 2002 | Palomar | NEAT | · | 4.3 km | MPC · JPL |
| 313348 | 2002 GQ_{110} | — | April 10, 2002 | Socorro | LINEAR | EOS | 3.1 km | MPC · JPL |
| 313349 | 2002 GS_{120} | — | April 12, 2002 | Palomar | NEAT | EOS | 2.8 km | MPC · JPL |
| 313350 | 2002 GK_{123} | — | April 10, 2002 | Palomar | NEAT | · | 1.9 km | MPC · JPL |
| 313351 | 2002 GY_{124} | — | April 12, 2002 | Kitt Peak | Spacewatch | · | 4.0 km | MPC · JPL |
| 313352 | 2002 GX_{127} | — | April 12, 2002 | Socorro | LINEAR | · | 1.0 km | MPC · JPL |
| 313353 | 2002 GX_{133} | — | April 12, 2002 | Socorro | LINEAR | · | 3.1 km | MPC · JPL |
| 313354 | 2002 GC_{134} | — | April 12, 2002 | Socorro | LINEAR | V | 800 m | MPC · JPL |
| 313355 | 2002 GG_{136} | — | April 12, 2002 | Socorro | LINEAR | · | 3.7 km | MPC · JPL |
| 313356 | 2002 GS_{145} | — | April 12, 2002 | Socorro | LINEAR | · | 880 m | MPC · JPL |
| 313357 | 2002 GU_{146} | — | April 13, 2002 | Palomar | NEAT | L4 | 16 km | MPC · JPL |
| 313358 | 2002 GP_{153} | — | April 12, 2002 | Palomar | NEAT | · | 6.2 km | MPC · JPL |
| 313359 | 2002 GA_{176} | — | April 11, 2002 | Socorro | LINEAR | · | 2.3 km | MPC · JPL |
| 313360 | 2002 GV_{179} | — | April 4, 2002 | Palomar | NEAT | EOS | 2.2 km | MPC · JPL |
| 313361 | 2002 GT_{183} | — | April 9, 2002 | Palomar | NEAT | · | 3.4 km | MPC · JPL |
| 313362 | 2002 GE_{184} | — | April 14, 2002 | Palomar | NEAT | · | 2.2 km | MPC · JPL |
| 313363 | 2002 GM_{190} | — | December 18, 2004 | Mount Lemmon | Mount Lemmon Survey | · | 960 m | MPC · JPL |
| 313364 | 2002 GS_{190} | — | December 20, 2004 | Mount Lemmon | Mount Lemmon Survey | · | 1.6 km | MPC · JPL |
| 313365 | 2002 HD_{13} | — | April 22, 2002 | Socorro | LINEAR | H | 820 m | MPC · JPL |
| 313366 | 2002 JE_{24} | — | May 8, 2002 | Socorro | LINEAR | · | 4.1 km | MPC · JPL |
| 313367 | 2002 JL_{27} | — | May 8, 2002 | Socorro | LINEAR | · | 1.8 km | MPC · JPL |
| 313368 | 2002 JL_{30} | — | May 9, 2002 | Socorro | LINEAR | · | 4.2 km | MPC · JPL |
| 313369 | 2002 JM_{34} | — | May 9, 2002 | Socorro | LINEAR | T_{j} (2.99) | 7.9 km | MPC · JPL |
| 313370 | 2002 JW_{67} | — | May 9, 2002 | Socorro | LINEAR | H | 730 m | MPC · JPL |
| 313371 | 2002 JD_{98} | — | May 8, 2002 | Socorro | LINEAR | PHO | 3.0 km | MPC · JPL |
| 313372 | 2002 JJ_{100} | — | May 6, 2002 | Socorro | LINEAR | · | 3.5 km | MPC · JPL |
| 313373 | 2002 JN_{120} | — | May 5, 2002 | Palomar | NEAT | · | 4.1 km | MPC · JPL |
| 313374 | 2002 JH_{144} | — | May 13, 2002 | Palomar | NEAT | · | 4.3 km | MPC · JPL |
| 313375 | 2002 JM_{145} | — | May 14, 2002 | Palomar | NEAT | · | 5.4 km | MPC · JPL |
| 313376 | 2002 JS_{150} | — | March 4, 2005 | Mount Lemmon | Mount Lemmon Survey | · | 1.1 km | MPC · JPL |
| 313377 | 2002 KK_{2} | — | May 16, 2002 | Haleakala | NEAT | · | 940 m | MPC · JPL |
| 313378 | 2002 KT_{13} | — | May 19, 2002 | Palomar | NEAT | · | 1.0 km | MPC · JPL |
| 313379 | 2002 KP_{16} | — | December 5, 2007 | Kitt Peak | Spacewatch | · | 1.6 km | MPC · JPL |
| 313380 | 2002 LE_{16} | — | June 6, 2002 | Socorro | LINEAR | · | 1.6 km | MPC · JPL |
| 313381 | 2002 LG_{25} | — | June 3, 2002 | Socorro | LINEAR | · | 4.2 km | MPC · JPL |
| 313382 | 2002 LG_{33} | — | June 4, 2002 | Anderson Mesa | LONEOS | · | 4.4 km | MPC · JPL |
| 313383 | 2002 LS_{49} | — | June 8, 2002 | Palomar | NEAT | · | 4.6 km | MPC · JPL |
| 313384 Holetschek | 2002 LP_{60} | Holetschek | June 12, 2002 | Palomar | M. Meyer | NYS | 1.3 km | MPC · JPL |
| 313385 | 2002 NZ_{20} | — | July 9, 2002 | Socorro | LINEAR | · | 4.5 km | MPC · JPL |
| 313386 | 2002 NG_{22} | — | July 9, 2002 | Socorro | LINEAR | · | 1.4 km | MPC · JPL |
| 313387 | 2002 ND_{42} | — | July 14, 2002 | Palomar | NEAT | NYS | 1.4 km | MPC · JPL |
| 313388 | 2002 NU_{54} | — | July 5, 2002 | Palomar | NEAT | PHO | 3.3 km | MPC · JPL |
| 313389 | 2002 NZ_{59} | — | July 14, 2002 | Palomar | NEAT | · | 1.6 km | MPC · JPL |
| 313390 | 2002 NS_{62} | — | July 5, 2002 | Palomar | NEAT | · | 1.8 km | MPC · JPL |
| 313391 | 2002 NL_{64} | — | July 2, 2002 | Palomar | NEAT | · | 1.3 km | MPC · JPL |
| 313392 | 2002 NG_{68} | — | July 12, 2002 | Palomar | NEAT | · | 1.3 km | MPC · JPL |
| 313393 | 2002 NQ_{71} | — | July 9, 2002 | Palomar | NEAT | V | 740 m | MPC · JPL |
| 313394 | 2002 NK_{73} | — | July 5, 2002 | Palomar | NEAT | NYS | 1.1 km | MPC · JPL |
| 313395 | 2002 NP_{73} | — | July 6, 2002 | Palomar | NEAT | · | 1.4 km | MPC · JPL |
| 313396 | 2002 ND_{74} | — | August 12, 2002 | Cerro Tololo | Deep Ecliptic Survey | · | 1.3 km | MPC · JPL |
| 313397 | 2002 NH_{76} | — | May 8, 2005 | Kitt Peak | Spacewatch | · | 2.3 km | MPC · JPL |
| 313398 | 2002 NG_{77} | — | December 31, 2007 | Mount Lemmon | Mount Lemmon Survey | · | 1.3 km | MPC · JPL |
| 313399 | 2002 PW_{19} | — | August 6, 2002 | Palomar | NEAT | · | 1.3 km | MPC · JPL |
| 313400 | 2002 PO_{53} | — | August 8, 2002 | Palomar | NEAT | · | 1.7 km | MPC · JPL |

== 313401–313500 ==
back to top

| Designation | | | Discovery | | | Properties | | Ref |
| Permanent | Provisional | Named after | Date | Site | Discoverer(s) | Category | Diam. | Ref |
|---|---|---|---|---|---|---|---|---|
| 313401 | 2002 PQ_{70} | — | August 11, 2002 | Socorro | LINEAR | · | 5.3 km | MPC · JPL |
| 313402 | 2002 PU_{75} | — | August 8, 2002 | Palomar | NEAT | · | 1.5 km | MPC · JPL |
| 313403 | 2002 PF_{80} | — | August 11, 2002 | Palomar | NEAT | · | 1.8 km | MPC · JPL |
| 313404 | 2002 PG_{101} | — | August 12, 2002 | Socorro | LINEAR | · | 1.6 km | MPC · JPL |
| 313405 | 2002 PC_{105} | — | August 12, 2002 | Socorro | LINEAR | · | 1.7 km | MPC · JPL |
| 313406 | 2002 PP_{128} | — | August 14, 2002 | Socorro | LINEAR | · | 1.8 km | MPC · JPL |
| 313407 | 2002 PA_{130} | — | August 15, 2002 | Socorro | LINEAR | (5) | 1.2 km | MPC · JPL |
| 313408 | 2002 PU_{138} | — | August 11, 2002 | Palomar | NEAT | H | 770 m | MPC · JPL |
| 313409 | 2002 PN_{155} | — | August 8, 2002 | Palomar | S. F. Hönig | H | 580 m | MPC · JPL |
| 313410 | 2002 PL_{159} | — | August 8, 2002 | Palomar | S. F. Hönig | · | 1.2 km | MPC · JPL |
| 313411 | 2002 PE_{171} | — | August 7, 2002 | Palomar | NEAT | T_{j} (2.98) | 3.6 km | MPC · JPL |
| 313412 | 2002 PY_{173} | — | August 8, 2002 | Palomar | NEAT | (5) | 890 m | MPC · JPL |
| 313413 | 2002 PK_{175} | — | August 7, 2002 | Palomar | NEAT | CYB | 5.9 km | MPC · JPL |
| 313414 | 2002 PN_{177} | — | August 29, 2002 | Kitt Peak | Spacewatch | · | 1.3 km | MPC · JPL |
| 313415 | 2002 PU_{179} | — | August 8, 2002 | Palomar | NEAT | · | 1.2 km | MPC · JPL |
| 313416 | 2002 PB_{180} | — | August 8, 2002 | Palomar | NEAT | · | 1.2 km | MPC · JPL |
| 313417 | 2002 PJ_{197} | — | May 26, 2006 | Mount Lemmon | Mount Lemmon Survey | · | 2.0 km | MPC · JPL |
| 313418 | 2002 QE_{5} | — | August 16, 2002 | Palomar | NEAT | · | 1.9 km | MPC · JPL |
| 313419 | 2002 QL_{22} | — | August 18, 2002 | Palomar | NEAT | · | 1.3 km | MPC · JPL |
| 313420 | 2002 QK_{35} | — | August 29, 2002 | Palomar | NEAT | · | 1.3 km | MPC · JPL |
| 313421 | 2002 QP_{42} | — | August 30, 2002 | Palomar | NEAT | · | 3.5 km | MPC · JPL |
| 313422 | 2002 QK_{48} | — | August 29, 2002 | Palomar | S. F. Hönig | · | 3.3 km | MPC · JPL |
| 313423 | 2002 QR_{49} | — | August 29, 2002 | Palomar | R. Matson | · | 1.1 km | MPC · JPL |
| 313424 | 2002 QO_{53} | — | August 29, 2002 | Palomar | S. F. Hönig | · | 1.3 km | MPC · JPL |
| 313425 | 2002 QT_{54} | — | August 29, 2002 | Palomar | S. F. Hönig | · | 1.4 km | MPC · JPL |
| 313426 | 2002 QO_{72} | — | August 18, 2002 | Palomar | NEAT | · | 1.8 km | MPC · JPL |
| 313427 | 2002 QL_{75} | — | August 30, 2002 | Palomar | NEAT | · | 1.4 km | MPC · JPL |
| 313428 | 2002 QR_{79} | — | August 17, 2002 | Palomar | NEAT | · | 1.3 km | MPC · JPL |
| 313429 | 2002 QZ_{81} | — | August 17, 2002 | Palomar | NEAT | · | 1.7 km | MPC · JPL |
| 313430 | 2002 QK_{86} | — | August 17, 2002 | Palomar | NEAT | · | 1.1 km | MPC · JPL |
| 313431 | 2002 QX_{97} | — | August 18, 2002 | Palomar | NEAT | · | 980 m | MPC · JPL |
| 313432 | 2002 QC_{116} | — | August 18, 2002 | Palomar | NEAT | · | 1.4 km | MPC · JPL |
| 313433 | 2002 QL_{126} | — | August 17, 2002 | Palomar | NEAT | · | 3.8 km | MPC · JPL |
| 313434 | 2002 QL_{146} | — | August 18, 2006 | Kitt Peak | Spacewatch | · | 1.6 km | MPC · JPL |
| 313435 | 2002 RC_{3} | — | September 4, 2002 | Anderson Mesa | LONEOS | V | 1.1 km | MPC · JPL |
| 313436 | 2002 RU_{5} | — | September 3, 2002 | Palomar | NEAT | · | 1.8 km | MPC · JPL |
| 313437 | 2002 RM_{8} | — | September 3, 2002 | Haleakala | NEAT | · | 1.2 km | MPC · JPL |
| 313438 | 2002 RA_{14} | — | September 4, 2002 | Anderson Mesa | LONEOS | (5) | 1.2 km | MPC · JPL |
| 313439 | 2002 RH_{42} | — | September 5, 2002 | Socorro | LINEAR | · | 2.2 km | MPC · JPL |
| 313440 | 2002 RL_{91} | — | September 5, 2002 | Socorro | LINEAR | · | 1.2 km | MPC · JPL |
| 313441 | 2002 RJ_{105} | — | September 5, 2002 | Socorro | LINEAR | · | 1.6 km | MPC · JPL |
| 313442 | 2002 RM_{143} | — | September 11, 2002 | Palomar | NEAT | · | 1.8 km | MPC · JPL |
| 313443 | 2002 RK_{156} | — | September 11, 2002 | Palomar | NEAT | · | 1.5 km | MPC · JPL |
| 313444 | 2002 RS_{163} | — | September 12, 2002 | Palomar | NEAT | · | 1.2 km | MPC · JPL |
| 313445 | 2002 RQ_{176} | — | September 13, 2002 | Palomar | NEAT | (5) | 1.2 km | MPC · JPL |
| 313446 | 2002 RA_{178} | — | September 13, 2002 | Palomar | NEAT | · | 1.2 km | MPC · JPL |
| 313447 | 2002 RL_{183} | — | September 11, 2002 | Palomar | NEAT | EUN | 1.6 km | MPC · JPL |
| 313448 | 2002 RC_{186} | — | September 12, 2002 | Palomar | NEAT | · | 1.5 km | MPC · JPL |
| 313449 | 2002 RN_{191} | — | September 12, 2002 | Palomar | NEAT | NYS | 1.5 km | MPC · JPL |
| 313450 | 2002 RJ_{218} | — | September 14, 2002 | Haleakala | NEAT | SYL · CYB | 5.6 km | MPC · JPL |
| 313451 | 2002 RN_{223} | — | September 13, 2002 | Haleakala | NEAT | (5) | 1.2 km | MPC · JPL |
| 313452 | 2002 RF_{254} | — | September 14, 2002 | Palomar | NEAT | · | 1.0 km | MPC · JPL |
| 313453 | 2002 RV_{264} | — | September 13, 2002 | Palomar | NEAT | · | 1.3 km | MPC · JPL |
| 313454 | 2002 RH_{266} | — | September 15, 2002 | Palomar | NEAT | · | 1.3 km | MPC · JPL |
| 313455 | 2002 SE_{1} | — | September 26, 2002 | Palomar | NEAT | (5) | 1.4 km | MPC · JPL |
| 313456 | 2002 SF_{8} | — | September 27, 2002 | Palomar | NEAT | (5) | 1.5 km | MPC · JPL |
| 313457 | 2002 SW_{28} | — | September 28, 2002 | Haleakala | NEAT | · | 3.0 km | MPC · JPL |
| 313458 | 2002 SG_{35} | — | September 29, 2002 | Haleakala | NEAT | · | 1.8 km | MPC · JPL |
| 313459 | 2002 SB_{37} | — | September 29, 2002 | Kitt Peak | Spacewatch | · | 1.2 km | MPC · JPL |
| 313460 | 2002 SC_{38} | — | September 30, 2002 | Socorro | LINEAR | (5) | 1.0 km | MPC · JPL |
| 313461 | 2002 SZ_{46} | — | September 29, 2002 | Haleakala | NEAT | EUN | 1.9 km | MPC · JPL |
| 313462 | 2002 SQ_{71} | — | September 17, 2002 | Palomar | NEAT | · | 1.3 km | MPC · JPL |
| 313463 | 2002 TH_{3} | — | October 1, 2002 | Anderson Mesa | LONEOS | (5) | 1.4 km | MPC · JPL |
| 313464 | 2002 TT_{4} | — | October 1, 2002 | Socorro | LINEAR | (5) | 1.5 km | MPC · JPL |
| 313465 | 2002 TH_{36} | — | October 2, 2002 | Socorro | LINEAR | (5) | 1.6 km | MPC · JPL |
| 313466 | 2002 TC_{55} | — | October 2, 2002 | Socorro | LINEAR | · | 1.9 km | MPC · JPL |
| 313467 | 2002 TZ_{83} | — | October 2, 2002 | Haleakala | NEAT | · | 2.3 km | MPC · JPL |
| 313468 | 2002 TL_{92} | — | October 3, 2002 | Socorro | LINEAR | · | 1.6 km | MPC · JPL |
| 313469 | 2002 TZ_{92} | — | October 2, 2002 | Socorro | LINEAR | · | 1.5 km | MPC · JPL |
| 313470 | 2002 TT_{113} | — | October 3, 2002 | Palomar | NEAT | CYB | 6.7 km | MPC · JPL |
| 313471 | 2002 TT_{120} | — | October 3, 2002 | Palomar | NEAT | · | 1.8 km | MPC · JPL |
| 313472 | 2002 TW_{132} | — | October 4, 2002 | Palomar | NEAT | (5) | 1.2 km | MPC · JPL |
| 313473 | 2002 TG_{153} | — | October 5, 2002 | Palomar | NEAT | · | 1.1 km | MPC · JPL |
| 313474 | 2002 TD_{160} | — | October 5, 2002 | Palomar | NEAT | · | 3.7 km | MPC · JPL |
| 313475 | 2002 TV_{163} | — | October 5, 2002 | Palomar | NEAT | · | 1.9 km | MPC · JPL |
| 313476 | 2002 TH_{179} | — | October 13, 2002 | Palomar | NEAT | EUN | 1.7 km | MPC · JPL |
| 313477 | 2002 TA_{180} | — | October 14, 2002 | Socorro | LINEAR | · | 3.0 km | MPC · JPL |
| 313478 | 2002 TY_{202} | — | October 4, 2002 | Socorro | LINEAR | · | 1.8 km | MPC · JPL |
| 313479 | 2002 TZ_{208} | — | October 5, 2002 | Socorro | LINEAR | KON | 3.2 km | MPC · JPL |
| 313480 | 2002 TO_{216} | — | October 6, 2002 | Palomar | NEAT | · | 2.4 km | MPC · JPL |
| 313481 | 2002 TD_{246} | — | October 9, 2002 | Anderson Mesa | LONEOS | (5) | 1.2 km | MPC · JPL |
| 313482 | 2002 TG_{254} | — | October 9, 2002 | Anderson Mesa | LONEOS | (5) | 1.4 km | MPC · JPL |
| 313483 | 2002 TB_{265} | — | October 10, 2002 | Socorro | LINEAR | EUN | 1.8 km | MPC · JPL |
| 313484 | 2002 TM_{271} | — | October 9, 2002 | Socorro | LINEAR | (5) | 1.5 km | MPC · JPL |
| 313485 | 2002 TH_{299} | — | October 13, 2002 | Kitt Peak | Spacewatch | MIS | 2.5 km | MPC · JPL |
| 313486 | 2002 TW_{325} | — | October 5, 2002 | Apache Point | SDSS | · | 1.2 km | MPC · JPL |
| 313487 | 2002 TE_{359} | — | October 10, 2002 | Apache Point | SDSS | · | 2.8 km | MPC · JPL |
| 313488 | 2002 TP_{362} | — | October 10, 2002 | Apache Point | SDSS | NYS | 1.5 km | MPC · JPL |
| 313489 | 2002 TA_{370} | — | October 10, 2002 | Apache Point | SDSS | KON | 2.4 km | MPC · JPL |
| 313490 | 2002 TD_{372} | — | October 10, 2002 | Apache Point | SDSS | · | 1.3 km | MPC · JPL |
| 313491 | 2002 UN_{55} | — | October 29, 2002 | Apache Point | SDSS | · | 1.7 km | MPC · JPL |
| 313492 | 2002 VT_{2} | — | November 2, 2002 | Haleakala | NEAT | · | 1.3 km | MPC · JPL |
| 313493 | 2002 VM_{10} | — | November 1, 2002 | Palomar | NEAT | · | 1.5 km | MPC · JPL |
| 313494 | 2002 VB_{29} | — | November 5, 2002 | Anderson Mesa | LONEOS | · | 2.1 km | MPC · JPL |
| 313495 | 2002 VD_{30} | — | November 5, 2002 | Socorro | LINEAR | · | 1.8 km | MPC · JPL |
| 313496 | 2002 VR_{37} | — | November 4, 2002 | Haleakala | NEAT | · | 1.9 km | MPC · JPL |
| 313497 | 2002 VC_{39} | — | November 5, 2002 | Socorro | LINEAR | · | 1.4 km | MPC · JPL |
| 313498 | 2002 VP_{40} | — | November 6, 2002 | Socorro | LINEAR | · | 2.2 km | MPC · JPL |
| 313499 | 2002 VY_{41} | — | November 5, 2002 | Palomar | NEAT | MIS | 3.0 km | MPC · JPL |
| 313500 | 2002 VV_{60} | — | November 4, 2002 | Palomar | NEAT | (5) | 1.2 km | MPC · JPL |

== 313501–313600 ==
back to top

| Designation | | | Discovery | | | Properties | | Ref |
| Permanent | Provisional | Named after | Date | Site | Discoverer(s) | Category | Diam. | Ref |
|---|---|---|---|---|---|---|---|---|
| 313501 | 2002 VS_{65} | — | November 7, 2002 | Socorro | LINEAR | · | 1.3 km | MPC · JPL |
| 313502 | 2002 VQ_{83} | — | November 7, 2002 | Socorro | LINEAR | EUN | 1.6 km | MPC · JPL |
| 313503 | 2002 VF_{100} | — | November 11, 2002 | Socorro | LINEAR | EUN | 1.6 km | MPC · JPL |
| 313504 | 2002 VO_{115} | — | November 11, 2002 | Kingsnake | J. V. McClusky | MAR | 1.3 km | MPC · JPL |
| 313505 | 2002 VE_{116} | — | November 12, 2002 | Anderson Mesa | LONEOS | · | 2.5 km | MPC · JPL |
| 313506 | 2002 VJ_{116} | — | November 12, 2002 | Socorro | LINEAR | · | 1.8 km | MPC · JPL |
| 313507 | 2002 VV_{120} | — | November 12, 2002 | Palomar | NEAT | · | 2.0 km | MPC · JPL |
| 313508 | 2002 VJ_{127} | — | November 15, 2002 | Palomar | NEAT | EUN | 1.5 km | MPC · JPL |
| 313509 | 2002 VZ_{138} | — | November 14, 2002 | Palomar | NEAT | KON | 2.6 km | MPC · JPL |
| 313510 | 2002 VH_{139} | — | November 6, 2002 | Socorro | LINEAR | · | 1.4 km | MPC · JPL |
| 313511 | 2002 VR_{139} | — | November 13, 2002 | Palomar | NEAT | · | 2.0 km | MPC · JPL |
| 313512 | 2002 VN_{141} | — | November 6, 2002 | Palomar | NEAT | EUN | 1.7 km | MPC · JPL |
| 313513 | 2002 VZ_{147} | — | April 2, 2005 | Kitt Peak | Spacewatch | · | 2.7 km | MPC · JPL |
| 313514 | 2002 WJ_{5} | — | November 24, 2002 | Palomar | NEAT | · | 2.2 km | MPC · JPL |
| 313515 | 2002 WZ_{6} | — | November 24, 2002 | Palomar | NEAT | · | 1.8 km | MPC · JPL |
| 313516 | 2002 WE_{18} | — | November 30, 2002 | Socorro | LINEAR | · | 2.5 km | MPC · JPL |
| 313517 | 2002 WR_{27} | — | November 24, 2002 | Palomar | NEAT | · | 2.0 km | MPC · JPL |
| 313518 | 2002 XP_{1} | — | December 1, 2002 | Socorro | LINEAR | · | 1.5 km | MPC · JPL |
| 313519 | 2002 XS_{4} | — | December 4, 2002 | Desert Eagle | W. K. Y. Yeung | · | 2.1 km | MPC · JPL |
| 313520 | 2002 XO_{7} | — | December 2, 2002 | Socorro | LINEAR | · | 1.9 km | MPC · JPL |
| 313521 | 2002 XW_{11} | — | December 3, 2002 | Palomar | NEAT | BAR | 2.0 km | MPC · JPL |
| 313522 | 2002 XM_{22} | — | December 3, 2002 | Palomar | NEAT | · | 2.5 km | MPC · JPL |
| 313523 | 2002 XR_{26} | — | December 3, 2002 | Palomar | NEAT | EUN | 1.7 km | MPC · JPL |
| 313524 | 2002 XU_{26} | — | December 3, 2002 | Palomar | NEAT | · | 2.7 km | MPC · JPL |
| 313525 | 2002 XP_{31} | — | December 6, 2002 | Socorro | LINEAR | · | 2.0 km | MPC · JPL |
| 313526 | 2002 XA_{37} | — | December 6, 2002 | Socorro | LINEAR | · | 3.7 km | MPC · JPL |
| 313527 | 2002 XC_{37} | — | December 7, 2002 | Socorro | LINEAR | · | 2.5 km | MPC · JPL |
| 313528 | 2002 XK_{37} | — | December 7, 2002 | Desert Eagle | W. K. Y. Yeung | MIS | 2.5 km | MPC · JPL |
| 313529 | 2002 XF_{38} | — | December 6, 2002 | Socorro | LINEAR | · | 4.0 km | MPC · JPL |
| 313530 | 2002 XR_{53} | — | December 10, 2002 | Palomar | NEAT | · | 1.9 km | MPC · JPL |
| 313531 | 2002 XN_{71} | — | December 10, 2002 | Socorro | LINEAR | · | 2.0 km | MPC · JPL |
| 313532 | 2002 XK_{79} | — | December 11, 2002 | Socorro | LINEAR | EUN | 1.9 km | MPC · JPL |
| 313533 | 2002 XA_{88} | — | December 12, 2002 | Palomar | NEAT | · | 1.8 km | MPC · JPL |
| 313534 | 2002 XN_{92} | — | December 5, 2002 | Kitt Peak | M. W. Buie | MAR | 1.3 km | MPC · JPL |
| 313535 | 2002 XB_{117} | — | December 7, 2002 | Palomar | NEAT | · | 1.4 km | MPC · JPL |
| 313536 | 2002 XJ_{117} | — | December 11, 2002 | Palomar | NEAT | · | 1.6 km | MPC · JPL |
| 313537 | 2002 YY_{11} | — | December 31, 2002 | Socorro | LINEAR | PAL | 2.1 km | MPC · JPL |
| 313538 | 2002 YB_{12} | — | December 31, 2002 | Socorro | LINEAR | APO · moon | 770 m | MPC · JPL |
| 313539 | 2002 YT_{27} | — | December 31, 2002 | Socorro | LINEAR | JUN | 1.4 km | MPC · JPL |
| 313540 | 2003 AV_{32} | — | January 5, 2003 | Socorro | LINEAR | · | 3.1 km | MPC · JPL |
| 313541 | 2003 AT_{57} | — | January 5, 2003 | Socorro | LINEAR | · | 2.7 km | MPC · JPL |
| 313542 | 2003 AR_{63} | — | January 8, 2003 | Socorro | LINEAR | LEO | 2.2 km | MPC · JPL |
| 313543 | 2003 AK_{77} | — | December 5, 2002 | Socorro | LINEAR | · | 2.2 km | MPC · JPL |
| 313544 | 2003 AB_{78} | — | January 10, 2003 | Socorro | LINEAR | · | 3.5 km | MPC · JPL |
| 313545 | 2003 AO_{81} | — | January 10, 2003 | Socorro | LINEAR | JUN | 1.2 km | MPC · JPL |
| 313546 | 2003 AY_{81} | — | January 13, 2003 | Socorro | LINEAR | EUN · | 4.9 km | MPC · JPL |
| 313547 | 2003 AC_{85} | — | January 7, 2003 | Socorro | LINEAR | · | 1.9 km | MPC · JPL |
| 313548 | 2003 BL_{1} | — | January 23, 2003 | Socorro | LINEAR | AMO | 480 m | MPC · JPL |
| 313549 | 2003 BD_{3} | — | January 24, 2003 | La Silla | A. Boattini, H. Scholl | · | 2.1 km | MPC · JPL |
| 313550 | 2003 BT_{3} | — | January 23, 2003 | La Silla | A. Boattini, H. Scholl | · | 2.5 km | MPC · JPL |
| 313551 | 2003 BV_{12} | — | January 26, 2003 | Haleakala | NEAT | · | 2.6 km | MPC · JPL |
| 313552 | 2003 BX_{33} | — | January 28, 2003 | Haleakala | NEAT | APO | 230 m | MPC · JPL |
| 313553 | 2003 BL_{35} | — | January 27, 2003 | Kitt Peak | Spacewatch | · | 2.2 km | MPC · JPL |
| 313554 | 2003 BY_{61} | — | January 28, 2003 | Socorro | LINEAR | EUN | 2.2 km | MPC · JPL |
| 313555 | 2003 BO_{67} | — | January 27, 2003 | Anderson Mesa | LONEOS | GEF | 1.6 km | MPC · JPL |
| 313556 | 2003 BY_{70} | — | January 31, 2003 | Kitt Peak | Spacewatch | · | 2.9 km | MPC · JPL |
| 313557 | 2003 BZ_{71} | — | January 28, 2003 | Socorro | LINEAR | · | 2.1 km | MPC · JPL |
| 313558 | 2003 BU_{73} | — | January 29, 2003 | Palomar | NEAT | · | 2.4 km | MPC · JPL |
| 313559 | 2003 BR_{74} | — | January 29, 2003 | Palomar | NEAT | · | 1.8 km | MPC · JPL |
| 313560 | 2003 BD_{75} | — | January 29, 2003 | Palomar | NEAT | GEF | 1.5 km | MPC · JPL |
| 313561 | 2003 BE_{78} | — | January 30, 2003 | Haleakala | NEAT | · | 2.1 km | MPC · JPL |
| 313562 | 2003 BU_{80} | — | January 30, 2003 | Anderson Mesa | LONEOS | · | 1.7 km | MPC · JPL |
| 313563 | 2003 BL_{92} | — | January 27, 2003 | Socorro | LINEAR | · | 2.3 km | MPC · JPL |
| 313564 | 2003 BJ_{93} | — | January 29, 2003 | Palomar | NEAT | · | 1.5 km | MPC · JPL |
| 313565 | 2003 CU | — | January 7, 2003 | Socorro | LINEAR | · | 2.8 km | MPC · JPL |
| 313566 | 2003 CX_{19} | — | February 9, 2003 | Palomar | NEAT | · | 2.3 km | MPC · JPL |
| 313567 | 2003 DE | — | February 19, 2003 | Haleakala | NEAT | (32418) | 2.6 km | MPC · JPL |
| 313568 | 2003 DW_{4} | — | February 22, 2003 | Palomar | NEAT | · | 3.4 km | MPC · JPL |
| 313569 | 2003 DA_{6} | — | February 22, 2003 | Palomar | NEAT | · | 2.6 km | MPC · JPL |
| 313570 | 2003 DS_{6} | — | February 23, 2003 | Campo Imperatore | CINEOS | · | 2.2 km | MPC · JPL |
| 313571 | 2003 DG_{7} | — | February 23, 2003 | Campo Imperatore | CINEOS | · | 2.3 km | MPC · JPL |
| 313572 | 2003 DE_{15} | — | February 26, 2003 | Socorro | LINEAR | · | 2.4 km | MPC · JPL |
| 313573 | 2003 DV_{20} | — | February 22, 2003 | Palomar | NEAT | · | 2.5 km | MPC · JPL |
| 313574 | 2003 EO_{1} | — | March 6, 2003 | Socorro | LINEAR | · | 2.3 km | MPC · JPL |
| 313575 | 2003 ES_{2} | — | March 5, 2003 | Socorro | LINEAR | · | 2.9 km | MPC · JPL |
| 313576 | 2003 ER_{4} | — | March 7, 2003 | Palomar | NEAT | · | 2.1 km | MPC · JPL |
| 313577 | 2003 EG_{33} | — | March 7, 2003 | Anderson Mesa | LONEOS | EUN | 1.8 km | MPC · JPL |
| 313578 | 2003 EJ_{35} | — | March 7, 2003 | Socorro | LINEAR | · | 2.9 km | MPC · JPL |
| 313579 | 2003 ES_{36} | — | March 8, 2003 | Palomar | NEAT | · | 2.5 km | MPC · JPL |
| 313580 | 2003 EM_{51} | — | March 11, 2003 | Palomar | NEAT | L4 | 10 km | MPC · JPL |
| 313581 | 2003 FJ_{3} | — | March 24, 2003 | Socorro | LINEAR | · | 3.3 km | MPC · JPL |
| 313582 | 2003 FJ_{25} | — | March 24, 2003 | Kitt Peak | Spacewatch | · | 2.5 km | MPC · JPL |
| 313583 | 2003 FW_{26} | — | March 24, 2003 | Kitt Peak | Spacewatch | · | 3.1 km | MPC · JPL |
| 313584 | 2003 FS_{33} | — | March 23, 2003 | Kitt Peak | Spacewatch | EOS | 1.9 km | MPC · JPL |
| 313585 | 2003 FK_{44} | — | March 23, 2003 | Kitt Peak | Spacewatch | · | 2.1 km | MPC · JPL |
| 313586 | 2003 FW_{88} | — | March 29, 2003 | Kitt Peak | Spacewatch | EUN | 1.9 km | MPC · JPL |
| 313587 | 2003 FE_{106} | — | March 26, 2003 | Palomar | NEAT | GEF | 1.7 km | MPC · JPL |
| 313588 | 2003 GX_{40} | — | April 9, 2003 | Palomar | NEAT | · | 2.4 km | MPC · JPL |
| 313589 | 2003 HL_{51} | — | April 29, 2003 | Haleakala | NEAT | · | 2.7 km | MPC · JPL |
| 313590 | 2003 KE_{7} | — | May 23, 2003 | Kitt Peak | Spacewatch | EOS | 1.9 km | MPC · JPL |
| 313591 | 2003 MB_{7} | — | June 28, 2003 | Socorro | LINEAR | · | 2.2 km | MPC · JPL |
| 313592 | 2003 NH_{1} | — | July 2, 2003 | Socorro | LINEAR | THB | 4.0 km | MPC · JPL |
| 313593 | 2003 NQ_{4} | — | July 4, 2003 | Socorro | LINEAR | · | 1.2 km | MPC · JPL |
| 313594 | 2003 NB_{7} | — | July 6, 2003 | Reedy Creek | J. Broughton | · | 1.2 km | MPC · JPL |
| 313595 | 2003 NC_{13} | — | July 7, 2003 | Kitt Peak | Spacewatch | · | 1.4 km | MPC · JPL |
| 313596 | 2003 OB_{8} | — | July 25, 2003 | Reedy Creek | J. Broughton | · | 2.6 km | MPC · JPL |
| 313597 | 2003 ON_{8} | — | July 26, 2003 | Reedy Creek | J. Broughton | · | 1.3 km | MPC · JPL |
| 313598 | 2003 OU_{10} | — | July 27, 2003 | Reedy Creek | J. Broughton | TIR | 4.6 km | MPC · JPL |
| 313599 | 2003 OF_{20} | — | July 30, 2003 | Campo Imperatore | CINEOS | · | 4.2 km | MPC · JPL |
| 313600 | 2003 OV_{28} | — | July 24, 2003 | Palomar | NEAT | · | 1.3 km | MPC · JPL |

== 313601–313700 ==
back to top

| Designation | | | Discovery | | | Properties | | Ref |
| Permanent | Provisional | Named after | Date | Site | Discoverer(s) | Category | Diam. | Ref |
|---|---|---|---|---|---|---|---|---|
| 313601 | 2003 OL_{33} | — | July 24, 2003 | Palomar | NEAT | · | 4.2 km | MPC · JPL |
| 313602 | 2003 PS | — | August 1, 2003 | Socorro | LINEAR | · | 1.9 km | MPC · JPL |
| 313603 | 2003 QT_{3} | — | August 17, 2003 | Haleakala | NEAT | · | 1.2 km | MPC · JPL |
| 313604 | 2003 QT_{21} | — | August 22, 2003 | Palomar | NEAT | · | 1.7 km | MPC · JPL |
| 313605 | 2003 QG_{25} | — | August 22, 2003 | Palomar | NEAT | · | 1.0 km | MPC · JPL |
| 313606 | 2003 QB_{27} | — | August 22, 2003 | Campo Imperatore | CINEOS | · | 1.3 km | MPC · JPL |
| 313607 | 2003 QL_{30} | — | August 24, 2003 | Reedy Creek | J. Broughton | · | 1.7 km | MPC · JPL |
| 313608 | 2003 QT_{35} | — | August 22, 2003 | Palomar | NEAT | · | 3.9 km | MPC · JPL |
| 313609 | 2003 QH_{38} | — | August 22, 2003 | Socorro | LINEAR | · | 1.4 km | MPC · JPL |
| 313610 | 2003 QD_{44} | — | August 22, 2003 | Haleakala | NEAT | · | 1.5 km | MPC · JPL |
| 313611 | 2003 QK_{58} | — | August 23, 2003 | Palomar | NEAT | NYS | 1.3 km | MPC · JPL |
| 313612 | 2003 QR_{58} | — | August 23, 2003 | Palomar | NEAT | NYS | 1.2 km | MPC · JPL |
| 313613 | 2003 QP_{62} | — | August 23, 2003 | Socorro | LINEAR | · | 2.2 km | MPC · JPL |
| 313614 | 2003 QX_{65} | — | August 25, 2003 | Socorro | LINEAR | · | 1.5 km | MPC · JPL |
| 313615 | 2003 QZ_{74} | — | August 24, 2003 | Socorro | LINEAR | · | 4.7 km | MPC · JPL |
| 313616 | 2003 QT_{76} | — | August 24, 2003 | Socorro | LINEAR | · | 1.6 km | MPC · JPL |
| 313617 | 2003 QC_{87} | — | August 25, 2003 | Socorro | LINEAR | NYS | 1.0 km | MPC · JPL |
| 313618 | 2003 QU_{94} | — | August 29, 2003 | Socorro | LINEAR | · | 1.2 km | MPC · JPL |
| 313619 | 2003 QE_{107} | — | August 31, 2003 | Socorro | LINEAR | V | 1.0 km | MPC · JPL |
| 313620 | 2003 QW_{108} | — | August 31, 2003 | Socorro | LINEAR | · | 4.0 km | MPC · JPL |
| 313621 | 2003 QP_{109} | — | August 31, 2003 | Socorro | LINEAR | · | 1.3 km | MPC · JPL |
| 313622 | 2003 QJ_{111} | — | August 31, 2003 | Socorro | LINEAR | · | 2.2 km | MPC · JPL |
| 313623 | 2003 RD_{3} | — | September 1, 2003 | Socorro | LINEAR | · | 1.1 km | MPC · JPL |
| 313624 | 2003 RZ_{11} | — | September 14, 2003 | Palomar | NEAT | PHO | 1.7 km | MPC · JPL |
| 313625 | 2003 RH_{14} | — | September 15, 2003 | Kleť | M. Tichý | · | 3.7 km | MPC · JPL |
| 313626 | 2003 RB_{17} | — | September 15, 2003 | Palomar | NEAT | · | 1.2 km | MPC · JPL |
| 313627 | 2003 RW_{20} | — | September 15, 2003 | Anderson Mesa | LONEOS | · | 1.4 km | MPC · JPL |
| 313628 | 2003 RC_{23} | — | September 13, 2003 | Haleakala | NEAT | · | 1.8 km | MPC · JPL |
| 313629 | 2003 RE_{23} | — | September 13, 2003 | Haleakala | NEAT | · | 1.1 km | MPC · JPL |
| 313630 | 2003 RH_{27} | — | September 2, 2003 | Socorro | LINEAR | URS | 4.8 km | MPC · JPL |
| 313631 | 2003 ST_{8} | — | September 17, 2003 | Kitt Peak | Spacewatch | · | 1.1 km | MPC · JPL |
| 313632 | 2003 SE_{11} | — | September 17, 2003 | Socorro | LINEAR | H | 830 m | MPC · JPL |
| 313633 | 2003 SZ_{13} | — | September 17, 2003 | Kitt Peak | Spacewatch | · | 1.5 km | MPC · JPL |
| 313634 | 2003 SB_{14} | — | September 17, 2003 | Kitt Peak | Spacewatch | · | 4.2 km | MPC · JPL |
| 313635 | 2003 SV_{31} | — | September 18, 2003 | Kitt Peak | Spacewatch | MAS | 820 m | MPC · JPL |
| 313636 | 2003 SJ_{33} | — | September 16, 2003 | Anderson Mesa | LONEOS | · | 1.1 km | MPC · JPL |
| 313637 | 2003 SG_{35} | — | September 18, 2003 | Kitt Peak | Spacewatch | NYS | 1.1 km | MPC · JPL |
| 313638 | 2003 SC_{40} | — | September 16, 2003 | Palomar | NEAT | · | 6.1 km | MPC · JPL |
| 313639 | 2003 SA_{47} | — | September 16, 2003 | Anderson Mesa | LONEOS | · | 1.6 km | MPC · JPL |
| 313640 | 2003 SL_{49} | — | September 18, 2003 | Palomar | NEAT | ERI | 2.2 km | MPC · JPL |
| 313641 | 2003 SH_{59} | — | September 17, 2003 | Anderson Mesa | LONEOS | · | 5.2 km | MPC · JPL |
| 313642 | 2003 SG_{63} | — | September 17, 2003 | Socorro | LINEAR | · | 1.5 km | MPC · JPL |
| 313643 | 2003 SW_{94} | — | September 19, 2003 | Kitt Peak | Spacewatch | · | 1.1 km | MPC · JPL |
| 313644 | 2003 SE_{98} | — | September 19, 2003 | Kitt Peak | Spacewatch | · | 1.4 km | MPC · JPL |
| 313645 | 2003 SC_{103} | — | September 20, 2003 | Socorro | LINEAR | · | 2.3 km | MPC · JPL |
| 313646 | 2003 SA_{120} | — | September 17, 2003 | Kitt Peak | Spacewatch | MAS | 650 m | MPC · JPL |
| 313647 | 2003 SS_{122} | — | September 18, 2003 | Socorro | LINEAR | THB | 4.2 km | MPC · JPL |
| 313648 | 2003 SW_{124} | — | September 18, 2003 | Črni Vrh | Mikuž, H. | · | 2.1 km | MPC · JPL |
| 313649 | 2003 SP_{128} | — | September 20, 2003 | Socorro | LINEAR | ERI | 2.0 km | MPC · JPL |
| 313650 | 2003 SU_{133} | — | September 18, 2003 | Palomar | NEAT | · | 1.5 km | MPC · JPL |
| 313651 | 2003 SW_{155} | — | September 19, 2003 | Anderson Mesa | LONEOS | · | 1.6 km | MPC · JPL |
| 313652 | 2003 SC_{160} | — | September 20, 2003 | Socorro | LINEAR | · | 1.2 km | MPC · JPL |
| 313653 | 2003 SL_{164} | — | September 20, 2003 | Anderson Mesa | LONEOS | · | 1.6 km | MPC · JPL |
| 313654 | 2003 SA_{165} | — | September 20, 2003 | Anderson Mesa | LONEOS | V | 920 m | MPC · JPL |
| 313655 | 2003 SZ_{170} | — | September 23, 2003 | Uccle | T. Pauwels | NYS | 1.2 km | MPC · JPL |
| 313656 | 2003 SY_{176} | — | September 18, 2003 | Palomar | NEAT | · | 1.4 km | MPC · JPL |
| 313657 | 2003 SP_{180} | — | September 19, 2003 | Kitt Peak | Spacewatch | · | 1.4 km | MPC · JPL |
| 313658 | 2003 SJ_{181} | — | September 20, 2003 | Socorro | LINEAR | TIR | 4.3 km | MPC · JPL |
| 313659 | 2003 SE_{184} | — | September 21, 2003 | Kitt Peak | Spacewatch | MAS | 750 m | MPC · JPL |
| 313660 | 2003 SO_{184} | — | September 21, 2003 | Kitt Peak | Spacewatch | NYS | 1.2 km | MPC · JPL |
| 313661 | 2003 SJ_{188} | — | September 22, 2003 | Anderson Mesa | LONEOS | V | 850 m | MPC · JPL |
| 313662 | 2003 SZ_{189} | — | September 24, 2003 | Palomar | NEAT | ERI | 1.7 km | MPC · JPL |
| 313663 | 2003 SQ_{190} | — | September 17, 2003 | Kitt Peak | Spacewatch | · | 1.3 km | MPC · JPL |
| 313664 | 2003 SP_{192} | — | September 20, 2003 | Socorro | LINEAR | V | 860 m | MPC · JPL |
| 313665 | 2003 SB_{193} | — | September 20, 2003 | Palomar | NEAT | · | 1.1 km | MPC · JPL |
| 313666 | 2003 SW_{194} | — | September 20, 2003 | Palomar | NEAT | · | 1.0 km | MPC · JPL |
| 313667 | 2003 SD_{196} | — | September 20, 2003 | Palomar | NEAT | · | 1.3 km | MPC · JPL |
| 313668 | 2003 SL_{202} | — | September 22, 2003 | Anderson Mesa | LONEOS | · | 5.1 km | MPC · JPL |
| 313669 | 2003 SP_{207} | — | September 26, 2003 | Socorro | LINEAR | MAS | 1.1 km | MPC · JPL |
| 313670 | 2003 SG_{208} | — | September 23, 2003 | Palomar | NEAT | · | 1.6 km | MPC · JPL |
| 313671 | 2003 SG_{209} | — | September 24, 2003 | Haleakala | NEAT | · | 950 m | MPC · JPL |
| 313672 | 2003 SO_{220} | — | September 29, 2003 | Desert Eagle | W. K. Y. Yeung | · | 1.8 km | MPC · JPL |
| 313673 | 2003 SW_{223} | — | September 30, 2003 | Desert Eagle | W. K. Y. Yeung | · | 1.7 km | MPC · JPL |
| 313674 | 2003 SV_{226} | — | September 26, 2003 | Socorro | LINEAR | MAS | 840 m | MPC · JPL |
| 313675 | 2003 SS_{227} | — | September 27, 2003 | Socorro | LINEAR | · | 1.7 km | MPC · JPL |
| 313676 | 2003 SF_{230} | — | September 24, 2003 | Palomar | NEAT | · | 4.4 km | MPC · JPL |
| 313677 | 2003 SW_{258} | — | September 28, 2003 | Socorro | LINEAR | · | 2.2 km | MPC · JPL |
| 313678 | 2003 SA_{266} | — | September 29, 2003 | Socorro | LINEAR | NYS | 1.5 km | MPC · JPL |
| 313679 | 2003 ST_{277} | — | September 30, 2003 | Socorro | LINEAR | ERI | 1.5 km | MPC · JPL |
| 313680 | 2003 SV_{287} | — | September 30, 2003 | Kitt Peak | Spacewatch | NYS | 1.2 km | MPC · JPL |
| 313681 | 2003 SA_{300} | — | September 17, 2003 | Palomar | NEAT | · | 1.6 km | MPC · JPL |
| 313682 | 2003 SF_{300} | — | September 17, 2003 | Palomar | NEAT | · | 1.3 km | MPC · JPL |
| 313683 | 2003 SO_{307} | — | September 27, 2003 | Socorro | LINEAR | · | 1.4 km | MPC · JPL |
| 313684 | 2003 SV_{311} | — | September 29, 2003 | Kitt Peak | Spacewatch | EOS | 2.6 km | MPC · JPL |
| 313685 | 2003 SP_{328} | — | September 21, 2003 | Anderson Mesa | LONEOS | V | 780 m | MPC · JPL |
| 313686 | 2003 SD_{333} | — | September 16, 2003 | Kitt Peak | Spacewatch | THM | 3.0 km | MPC · JPL |
| 313687 | 2003 SK_{344} | — | September 17, 2003 | Kitt Peak | Spacewatch | · | 2.7 km | MPC · JPL |
| 313688 | 2003 SY_{345} | — | September 18, 2003 | Palomar | NEAT | · | 940 m | MPC · JPL |
| 313689 | 2003 SW_{371} | — | September 26, 2003 | Apache Point | SDSS | · | 950 m | MPC · JPL |
| 313690 | 2003 SP_{382} | — | September 26, 2003 | Apache Point | SDSS | MAS | 790 m | MPC · JPL |
| 313691 | 2003 SG_{405} | — | September 27, 2003 | Apache Point | SDSS | V | 830 m | MPC · JPL |
| 313692 | 2003 TC_{6} | — | October 1, 2003 | Anderson Mesa | LONEOS | · | 1.3 km | MPC · JPL |
| 313693 | 2003 TZ_{11} | — | October 14, 2003 | Anderson Mesa | LONEOS | · | 2.8 km | MPC · JPL |
| 313694 | 2003 TB_{13} | — | October 5, 2003 | Socorro | LINEAR | PHO | 2.8 km | MPC · JPL |
| 313695 | 2003 TT_{13} | — | October 5, 2003 | Socorro | LINEAR | H | 580 m | MPC · JPL |
| 313696 | 2003 TY_{15} | — | October 15, 2003 | Anderson Mesa | LONEOS | · | 1.3 km | MPC · JPL |
| 313697 | 2003 TN_{16} | — | October 15, 2003 | Anderson Mesa | LONEOS | · | 1.7 km | MPC · JPL |
| 313698 | 2003 TE_{47} | — | October 3, 2003 | Kitt Peak | Spacewatch | V | 890 m | MPC · JPL |
| 313699 | 2003 TH_{50} | — | October 3, 2003 | Haleakala | NEAT | · | 1.5 km | MPC · JPL |
| 313700 | 2003 TV_{56} | — | October 5, 2003 | Kitt Peak | Spacewatch | V | 680 m | MPC · JPL |

== 313701–313800 ==
back to top

| Designation | | | Discovery | | | Properties | | Ref |
| Permanent | Provisional | Named after | Date | Site | Discoverer(s) | Category | Diam. | Ref |
|---|---|---|---|---|---|---|---|---|
| 313701 | 2003 UN_{3} | — | October 16, 2003 | Socorro | LINEAR | H | 3.0 km | MPC · JPL |
| 313702 | 2003 UH_{23} | — | October 22, 2003 | Socorro | LINEAR | · | 1.3 km | MPC · JPL |
| 313703 | 2003 UG_{24} | — | October 21, 2003 | Kitt Peak | Spacewatch | · | 1.1 km | MPC · JPL |
| 313704 | 2003 UG_{28} | — | October 17, 2003 | Kitt Peak | Spacewatch | · | 1.2 km | MPC · JPL |
| 313705 | 2003 UL_{42} | — | October 17, 2003 | Kitt Peak | Spacewatch | · | 4.6 km | MPC · JPL |
| 313706 | 2003 UN_{57} | — | October 21, 2003 | Socorro | LINEAR | NYS | 1.5 km | MPC · JPL |
| 313707 | 2003 UT_{61} | — | October 16, 2003 | Anderson Mesa | LONEOS | · | 1.4 km | MPC · JPL |
| 313708 | 2003 UE_{64} | — | October 16, 2003 | Anderson Mesa | LONEOS | · | 1.7 km | MPC · JPL |
| 313709 | 2003 UU_{74} | — | October 17, 2003 | Anderson Mesa | LONEOS | · | 1.4 km | MPC · JPL |
| 313710 | 2003 UW_{76} | — | October 17, 2003 | Anderson Mesa | LONEOS | · | 1.4 km | MPC · JPL |
| 313711 | 2003 US_{83} | — | October 17, 2003 | Anderson Mesa | LONEOS | · | 1.3 km | MPC · JPL |
| 313712 | 2003 UW_{88} | — | October 19, 2003 | Anderson Mesa | LONEOS | · | 2.0 km | MPC · JPL |
| 313713 | 2003 UE_{94} | — | October 18, 2003 | Kitt Peak | Spacewatch | NYS | 1.3 km | MPC · JPL |
| 313714 | 2003 UC_{97} | — | October 19, 2003 | Kitt Peak | Spacewatch | · | 1.6 km | MPC · JPL |
| 313715 | 2003 UW_{113} | — | October 20, 2003 | Socorro | LINEAR | V | 860 m | MPC · JPL |
| 313716 | 2003 UT_{118} | — | October 17, 2003 | Kitt Peak | Spacewatch | (6769) | 1.1 km | MPC · JPL |
| 313717 | 2003 UA_{120} | — | October 18, 2003 | Kitt Peak | Spacewatch | · | 1.2 km | MPC · JPL |
| 313718 | 2003 UM_{123} | — | October 19, 2003 | Kitt Peak | Spacewatch | · | 1.2 km | MPC · JPL |
| 313719 | 2003 UV_{129} | — | October 18, 2003 | Palomar | NEAT | · | 1.5 km | MPC · JPL |
| 313720 | 2003 UA_{132} | — | October 19, 2003 | Palomar | NEAT | · | 880 m | MPC · JPL |
| 313721 | 2003 UU_{149} | — | October 20, 2003 | Socorro | LINEAR | NYS | 1.9 km | MPC · JPL |
| 313722 | 2003 UL_{151} | — | October 21, 2003 | Socorro | LINEAR | · | 1.5 km | MPC · JPL |
| 313723 | 2003 US_{151} | — | October 21, 2003 | Socorro | LINEAR | · | 1.5 km | MPC · JPL |
| 313724 | 2003 UF_{152} | — | October 21, 2003 | Kitt Peak | Spacewatch | V | 870 m | MPC · JPL |
| 313725 | 2003 UF_{163} | — | October 21, 2003 | Socorro | LINEAR | NYS | 1.5 km | MPC · JPL |
| 313726 | 2003 UM_{169} | — | October 22, 2003 | Kitt Peak | Spacewatch | · | 1.1 km | MPC · JPL |
| 313727 | 2003 UF_{171} | — | October 19, 2003 | Kitt Peak | Spacewatch | NYS | 1.7 km | MPC · JPL |
| 313728 | 2003 UH_{173} | — | October 20, 2003 | Palomar | NEAT | · | 1.6 km | MPC · JPL |
| 313729 | 2003 UG_{174} | — | October 21, 2003 | Kitt Peak | Spacewatch | MAS | 990 m | MPC · JPL |
| 313730 | 2003 UC_{177} | — | October 21, 2003 | Anderson Mesa | LONEOS | · | 1.1 km | MPC · JPL |
| 313731 | 2003 US_{183} | — | October 21, 2003 | Palomar | NEAT | NYS | 1.5 km | MPC · JPL |
| 313732 | 2003 UV_{185} | — | October 22, 2003 | Socorro | LINEAR | MAS | 1.1 km | MPC · JPL |
| 313733 | 2003 UJ_{192} | — | October 23, 2003 | Anderson Mesa | LONEOS | · | 1.4 km | MPC · JPL |
| 313734 | 2003 UP_{198} | — | October 21, 2003 | Kitt Peak | Spacewatch | NYS | 2.1 km | MPC · JPL |
| 313735 | 2003 UC_{199} | — | October 21, 2003 | Socorro | LINEAR | · | 1.3 km | MPC · JPL |
| 313736 | 2003 UE_{200} | — | October 21, 2003 | Socorro | LINEAR | NYS | 1.2 km | MPC · JPL |
| 313737 | 2003 UK_{202} | — | October 21, 2003 | Socorro | LINEAR | · | 1.6 km | MPC · JPL |
| 313738 | 2003 UF_{209} | — | October 23, 2003 | Anderson Mesa | LONEOS | · | 1.2 km | MPC · JPL |
| 313739 | 2003 UQ_{213} | — | October 24, 2003 | Socorro | LINEAR | V | 780 m | MPC · JPL |
| 313740 | 2003 UP_{219} | — | October 21, 2003 | Kitt Peak | Spacewatch | · | 1.1 km | MPC · JPL |
| 313741 | 2003 UX_{221} | — | October 22, 2003 | Kitt Peak | Spacewatch | NYS | 1.3 km | MPC · JPL |
| 313742 | 2003 UH_{230} | — | October 23, 2003 | Kitt Peak | Spacewatch | · | 1.4 km | MPC · JPL |
| 313743 | 2003 UR_{236} | — | October 23, 2003 | Anderson Mesa | LONEOS | · | 1.7 km | MPC · JPL |
| 313744 | 2003 UV_{241} | — | October 24, 2003 | Socorro | LINEAR | NYS | 1.2 km | MPC · JPL |
| 313745 | 2003 UJ_{243} | — | October 24, 2003 | Socorro | LINEAR | NYS | 1.5 km | MPC · JPL |
| 313746 | 2003 UP_{244} | — | October 24, 2003 | Kitt Peak | Spacewatch | · | 1.5 km | MPC · JPL |
| 313747 | 2003 UA_{250} | — | October 25, 2003 | Socorro | LINEAR | · | 1.2 km | MPC · JPL |
| 313748 | 2003 UE_{251} | — | October 25, 2003 | Socorro | LINEAR | · | 1.2 km | MPC · JPL |
| 313749 | 2003 UB_{267} | — | October 28, 2003 | Socorro | LINEAR | · | 1.7 km | MPC · JPL |
| 313750 | 2003 UU_{317} | — | October 17, 2003 | Goodricke-Pigott | R. A. Tucker | · | 1.3 km | MPC · JPL |
| 313751 | 2003 UW_{339} | — | October 18, 2003 | Kitt Peak | Spacewatch | NYS | 1.4 km | MPC · JPL |
| 313752 | 2003 UK_{365} | — | October 20, 2003 | Kitt Peak | Spacewatch | · | 1.2 km | MPC · JPL |
| 313753 | 2003 UW_{370} | — | October 22, 2003 | Apache Point | SDSS | LUT | 5.8 km | MPC · JPL |
| 313754 | 2003 UD_{405} | — | October 23, 2003 | Apache Point | SDSS | · | 1.2 km | MPC · JPL |
| 313755 | 2003 VP_{10} | — | November 15, 2003 | Kitt Peak | Spacewatch | MAS | 890 m | MPC · JPL |
| 313756 | 2003 WA_{29} | — | January 10, 1997 | Kitt Peak | Spacewatch | V | 830 m | MPC · JPL |
| 313757 | 2003 WE_{51} | — | November 19, 2003 | Kitt Peak | Spacewatch | MAS | 750 m | MPC · JPL |
| 313758 | 2003 WA_{59} | — | November 18, 2003 | Kitt Peak | Spacewatch | · | 1.4 km | MPC · JPL |
| 313759 | 2003 WW_{79} | — | November 20, 2003 | Socorro | LINEAR | · | 1.3 km | MPC · JPL |
| 313760 | 2003 WG_{98} | — | November 24, 2003 | Socorro | LINEAR | · | 2.3 km | MPC · JPL |
| 313761 | 2003 WP_{113} | — | November 20, 2003 | Socorro | LINEAR | · | 2.0 km | MPC · JPL |
| 313762 | 2003 WS_{115} | — | November 20, 2003 | Socorro | LINEAR | · | 1.5 km | MPC · JPL |
| 313763 | 2003 WQ_{116} | — | November 20, 2003 | Socorro | LINEAR | · | 1.4 km | MPC · JPL |
| 313764 | 2003 WY_{128} | — | November 21, 2003 | Kitt Peak | Spacewatch | · | 1.4 km | MPC · JPL |
| 313765 | 2003 WG_{145} | — | November 21, 2003 | Socorro | LINEAR | NYS | 1.3 km | MPC · JPL |
| 313766 | 2003 WP_{156} | — | November 29, 2003 | Kitt Peak | Spacewatch | · | 2.5 km | MPC · JPL |
| 313767 | 2003 WZ_{168} | — | November 19, 2003 | Catalina | CSS | · | 1.3 km | MPC · JPL |
| 313768 | 2003 WO_{188} | — | November 20, 2003 | Socorro | LINEAR | NYS | 1.4 km | MPC · JPL |
| 313769 | 2003 XG_{14} | — | December 15, 2003 | Socorro | LINEAR | H | 710 m | MPC · JPL |
| 313770 | 2003 XG_{18} | — | December 14, 2003 | Kitt Peak | Spacewatch | · | 1.8 km | MPC · JPL |
| 313771 | 2003 XR_{31} | — | December 1, 2003 | Kitt Peak | Spacewatch | NYS | 920 m | MPC · JPL |
| 313772 | 2003 YU | — | December 17, 2003 | Socorro | LINEAR | H | 730 m | MPC · JPL |
| 313773 | 2003 YJ_{1} | — | December 17, 2003 | Socorro | LINEAR | H | 950 m | MPC · JPL |
| 313774 | 2003 YM_{6} | — | December 17, 2003 | Socorro | LINEAR | V | 830 m | MPC · JPL |
| 313775 | 2003 YA_{12} | — | December 17, 2003 | Socorro | LINEAR | · | 1.9 km | MPC · JPL |
| 313776 | 2003 YN_{18} | — | December 17, 2003 | Kitt Peak | Spacewatch | · | 1.7 km | MPC · JPL |
| 313777 | 2003 YQ_{19} | — | December 17, 2003 | Kitt Peak | Spacewatch | · | 1.5 km | MPC · JPL |
| 313778 | 2003 YG_{21} | — | December 17, 2003 | Kitt Peak | Spacewatch | · | 1.4 km | MPC · JPL |
| 313779 | 2003 YW_{24} | — | December 18, 2003 | Socorro | LINEAR | · | 2.5 km | MPC · JPL |
| 313780 | 2003 YY_{30} | — | December 18, 2003 | Socorro | LINEAR | PHO | 1.1 km | MPC · JPL |
| 313781 | 2003 YG_{45} | — | December 17, 2003 | Socorro | LINEAR | V | 880 m | MPC · JPL |
| 313782 | 2003 YQ_{46} | — | December 17, 2003 | Kitt Peak | Spacewatch | · | 1.1 km | MPC · JPL |
| 313783 | 2003 YS_{49} | — | December 18, 2003 | Socorro | LINEAR | · | 1.6 km | MPC · JPL |
| 313784 | 2003 YY_{64} | — | December 19, 2003 | Socorro | LINEAR | · | 1.6 km | MPC · JPL |
| 313785 | 2003 YQ_{66} | — | December 20, 2003 | Socorro | LINEAR | H | 820 m | MPC · JPL |
| 313786 | 2003 YZ_{70} | — | December 18, 2003 | Socorro | LINEAR | · | 2.8 km | MPC · JPL |
| 313787 | 2003 YB_{71} | — | December 18, 2003 | Socorro | LINEAR | · | 1.8 km | MPC · JPL |
| 313788 | 2003 YX_{90} | — | December 20, 2003 | Socorro | LINEAR | PHO | 1.5 km | MPC · JPL |
| 313789 | 2003 YE_{97} | — | December 19, 2003 | Socorro | LINEAR | · | 1.6 km | MPC · JPL |
| 313790 | 2003 YL_{111} | — | December 22, 2003 | Goodricke-Pigott | Reddy, V. | PHO | 1.5 km | MPC · JPL |
| 313791 | 2003 YO_{117} | — | December 27, 2003 | Socorro | LINEAR | H | 840 m | MPC · JPL |
| 313792 | 2003 YO_{141} | — | December 28, 2003 | Socorro | LINEAR | · | 1.8 km | MPC · JPL |
| 313793 | 2003 YD_{154} | — | December 29, 2003 | Socorro | LINEAR | · | 2.0 km | MPC · JPL |
| 313794 | 2003 YA_{155} | — | December 30, 2003 | Socorro | LINEAR | (194) | 2.2 km | MPC · JPL |
| 313795 | 2003 YH_{159} | — | December 17, 2003 | Socorro | LINEAR | · | 2.0 km | MPC · JPL |
| 313796 | 2003 YV_{168} | — | December 18, 2003 | Socorro | LINEAR | PHO | 1.4 km | MPC · JPL |
| 313797 | 2004 AA | — | January 2, 2004 | Desert Moon | Stevens, B. L. | MAS | 800 m | MPC · JPL |
| 313798 | 2004 AY_{4} | — | January 12, 2004 | Palomar | NEAT | H | 760 m | MPC · JPL |
| 313799 | 2004 AD_{8} | — | January 12, 2004 | Palomar | NEAT | H | 840 m | MPC · JPL |
| 313800 | 2004 BS_{12} | — | January 17, 2004 | Palomar | NEAT | · | 1.1 km | MPC · JPL |

== 313801–313900 ==
back to top

| Designation | | | Discovery | | | Properties | | Ref |
| Permanent | Provisional | Named after | Date | Site | Discoverer(s) | Category | Diam. | Ref |
|---|---|---|---|---|---|---|---|---|
| 313801 | 2004 BH_{13} | — | January 17, 2004 | Palomar | NEAT | 3:2 · SHU | 9.4 km | MPC · JPL |
| 313802 | 2004 BL_{16} | — | January 16, 2004 | Kitt Peak | Spacewatch | (194) | 1.8 km | MPC · JPL |
| 313803 | 2004 BK_{17} | — | January 17, 2004 | Palomar | NEAT | · | 2.2 km | MPC · JPL |
| 313804 | 2004 BC_{21} | — | January 17, 2004 | Palomar | NEAT | · | 960 m | MPC · JPL |
| 313805 | 2004 BE_{22} | — | January 18, 2004 | Kitt Peak | Spacewatch | (5) | 1.7 km | MPC · JPL |
| 313806 | 2004 BR_{22} | — | January 17, 2004 | Palomar | NEAT | · | 3.3 km | MPC · JPL |
| 313807 | 2004 BY_{34} | — | January 19, 2004 | Kitt Peak | Spacewatch | (5) | 1.4 km | MPC · JPL |
| 313808 | 2004 BA_{39} | — | January 21, 2004 | Kitt Peak | Spacewatch | · | 1.7 km | MPC · JPL |
| 313809 | 2004 BH_{41} | — | January 22, 2004 | Socorro | LINEAR | APO | 490 m | MPC · JPL |
| 313810 | 2004 BK_{56} | — | January 23, 2004 | Anderson Mesa | LONEOS | BAR | 2.0 km | MPC · JPL |
| 313811 | 2004 BZ_{59} | — | January 21, 2004 | Socorro | LINEAR | · | 2.3 km | MPC · JPL |
| 313812 | 2004 BD_{65} | — | January 22, 2004 | Socorro | LINEAR | · | 1.2 km | MPC · JPL |
| 313813 | 2004 BA_{69} | — | January 27, 2004 | Socorro | LINEAR | · | 3.9 km | MPC · JPL |
| 313814 | 2004 BU_{84} | — | January 27, 2004 | Anderson Mesa | LONEOS | · | 2.4 km | MPC · JPL |
| 313815 | 2004 BW_{84} | — | January 27, 2004 | Socorro | LINEAR | (5) | 1.3 km | MPC · JPL |
| 313816 | 2004 BN_{99} | — | January 27, 2004 | Kitt Peak | Spacewatch | · | 1.6 km | MPC · JPL |
| 313817 | 2004 BO_{101} | — | January 28, 2004 | Socorro | LINEAR | · | 2.4 km | MPC · JPL |
| 313818 | 2004 BR_{102} | — | January 30, 2004 | Socorro | LINEAR | · | 1.8 km | MPC · JPL |
| 313819 | 2004 BH_{119} | — | January 30, 2004 | Anderson Mesa | LONEOS | · | 2.1 km | MPC · JPL |
| 313820 | 2004 BP_{121} | — | January 17, 2004 | Palomar | NEAT | · | 1.8 km | MPC · JPL |
| 313821 | 2004 BY_{129} | — | January 16, 2004 | Kitt Peak | Spacewatch | · | 990 m | MPC · JPL |
| 313822 | 2004 BS_{146} | — | January 22, 2004 | Socorro | LINEAR | 3:2 | 7.8 km | MPC · JPL |
| 313823 | 2004 CM_{1} | — | February 10, 2004 | Palomar | NEAT | H | 700 m | MPC · JPL |
| 313824 | 2004 CW_{1} | — | February 10, 2004 | Palomar | NEAT | H | 960 m | MPC · JPL |
| 313825 | 2004 CK_{2} | — | February 11, 2004 | Palomar | NEAT | H | 760 m | MPC · JPL |
| 313826 | 2004 CT_{4} | — | February 10, 2004 | Palomar | NEAT | · | 2.0 km | MPC · JPL |
| 313827 | 2004 CG_{5} | — | February 10, 2004 | Palomar | NEAT | · | 1.8 km | MPC · JPL |
| 313828 | 2004 CW_{13} | — | February 11, 2004 | Anderson Mesa | LONEOS | · | 1.1 km | MPC · JPL |
| 313829 | 2004 CG_{14} | — | February 11, 2004 | Kitt Peak | Spacewatch | · | 1.2 km | MPC · JPL |
| 313830 | 2004 CD_{22} | — | February 11, 2004 | Catalina | CSS | · | 1.4 km | MPC · JPL |
| 313831 | 2004 CW_{22} | — | February 12, 2004 | Kitt Peak | Spacewatch | · | 1.8 km | MPC · JPL |
| 313832 | 2004 CE_{27} | — | February 11, 2004 | Palomar | NEAT | · | 1.5 km | MPC · JPL |
| 313833 | 2004 CS_{50} | — | February 9, 2004 | Anderson Mesa | LONEOS | · | 3.9 km | MPC · JPL |
| 313834 | 2004 CU_{56} | — | February 10, 2004 | Palomar | NEAT | H | 730 m | MPC · JPL |
| 313835 | 2004 CR_{74} | — | February 11, 2004 | Catalina | CSS | · | 450 m | MPC · JPL |
| 313836 | 2004 CM_{84} | — | February 13, 2004 | Kitt Peak | Spacewatch | · | 1.3 km | MPC · JPL |
| 313837 | 2004 CP_{100} | — | February 15, 2004 | Catalina | CSS | · | 1.4 km | MPC · JPL |
| 313838 | 2004 DR_{1} | — | February 18, 2004 | Socorro | LINEAR | H | 750 m | MPC · JPL |
| 313839 | 2004 DJ_{2} | — | February 18, 2004 | Goodricke-Pigott | Goodricke-Pigott | H | 960 m | MPC · JPL |
| 313840 | 2004 DD_{18} | — | February 18, 2004 | Socorro | LINEAR | H | 790 m | MPC · JPL |
| 313841 | 2004 DV_{22} | — | February 18, 2004 | Socorro | LINEAR | (5) | 1.6 km | MPC · JPL |
| 313842 | 2004 DC_{25} | — | February 19, 2004 | Socorro | LINEAR | H | 570 m | MPC · JPL |
| 313843 | 2004 DQ_{26} | — | February 16, 2004 | Socorro | LINEAR | · | 1.4 km | MPC · JPL |
| 313844 | 2004 DM_{45} | — | February 16, 2004 | Socorro | LINEAR | H | 830 m | MPC · JPL |
| 313845 | 2004 DZ_{58} | — | February 23, 2004 | Socorro | LINEAR | · | 1.9 km | MPC · JPL |
| 313846 | 2004 DL_{62} | — | February 19, 2004 | Socorro | LINEAR | · | 2.4 km | MPC · JPL |
| 313847 | 2004 EF_{32} | — | March 15, 2004 | Palomar | NEAT | BRA | 2.5 km | MPC · JPL |
| 313848 | 2004 EQ_{33} | — | March 15, 2004 | Kitt Peak | Spacewatch | H | 630 m | MPC · JPL |
| 313849 | 2004 EY_{37} | — | March 14, 2004 | Kitt Peak | Spacewatch | · | 1.1 km | MPC · JPL |
| 313850 | 2004 EO_{39} | — | March 15, 2004 | Kitt Peak | Spacewatch | · | 1.6 km | MPC · JPL |
| 313851 | 2004 EB_{41} | — | March 15, 2004 | Kitt Peak | Spacewatch | · | 1.0 km | MPC · JPL |
| 313852 | 2004 ED_{43} | — | March 15, 2004 | Catalina | CSS | · | 1.3 km | MPC · JPL |
| 313853 | 2004 EV_{62} | — | March 13, 2004 | Palomar | NEAT | EUN | 1.2 km | MPC · JPL |
| 313854 | 2004 EB_{95} | — | March 15, 2004 | Socorro | LINEAR | ADE | 3.3 km | MPC · JPL |
| 313855 | 2004 EF_{114} | — | March 15, 2004 | Palomar | NEAT | HNS | 1.7 km | MPC · JPL |
| 313856 | 2004 FK | — | March 16, 2004 | Catalina | CSS | H | 1.1 km | MPC · JPL |
| 313857 | 2004 FS_{7} | — | March 16, 2004 | Socorro | LINEAR | · | 2.2 km | MPC · JPL |
| 313858 | 2004 FZ_{9} | — | March 16, 2004 | Campo Imperatore | CINEOS | EUN | 1.2 km | MPC · JPL |
| 313859 | 2004 FM_{65} | — | March 19, 2004 | Socorro | LINEAR | · | 1.3 km | MPC · JPL |
| 313860 | 2004 FJ_{68} | — | March 20, 2004 | Socorro | LINEAR | · | 2.9 km | MPC · JPL |
| 313861 | 2004 FL_{112} | — | March 26, 2004 | Kitt Peak | Spacewatch | · | 1.3 km | MPC · JPL |
| 313862 | 2004 FB_{121} | — | March 23, 2004 | Socorro | LINEAR | · | 2.4 km | MPC · JPL |
| 313863 | 2004 FT_{122} | — | March 26, 2004 | Socorro | LINEAR | H | 680 m | MPC · JPL |
| 313864 | 2004 FC_{131} | — | March 22, 2004 | Anderson Mesa | LONEOS | · | 2.1 km | MPC · JPL |
| 313865 | 2004 FK_{136} | — | March 27, 2004 | Anderson Mesa | LONEOS | · | 2.5 km | MPC · JPL |
| 313866 | 2004 FW_{139} | — | March 26, 2004 | Socorro | LINEAR | BAR | 1.6 km | MPC · JPL |
| 313867 | 2004 FP_{143} | — | March 28, 2004 | Socorro | LINEAR | · | 1.8 km | MPC · JPL |
| 313868 | 2004 FC_{144} | — | March 29, 2004 | Kitt Peak | Spacewatch | (5) | 1.3 km | MPC · JPL |
| 313869 | 2004 GG_{15} | — | April 14, 2004 | Socorro | LINEAR | · | 2.7 km | MPC · JPL |
| 313870 | 2004 GV_{18} | — | April 14, 2004 | Anderson Mesa | LONEOS | · | 2.5 km | MPC · JPL |
| 313871 | 2004 GH_{19} | — | April 14, 2004 | Socorro | LINEAR | · | 2.0 km | MPC · JPL |
| 313872 | 2004 GE_{27} | — | April 15, 2004 | Socorro | LINEAR | · | 2.9 km | MPC · JPL |
| 313873 | 2004 GB_{34} | — | April 12, 2004 | Palomar | NEAT | EUN | 2.0 km | MPC · JPL |
| 313874 | 2004 GG_{35} | — | April 13, 2004 | Kitt Peak | Spacewatch | · | 1.7 km | MPC · JPL |
| 313875 | 2004 GN_{36} | — | April 13, 2004 | Palomar | NEAT | · | 1.8 km | MPC · JPL |
| 313876 | 2004 GF_{48} | — | April 12, 2004 | Kitt Peak | Spacewatch | · | 2.4 km | MPC · JPL |
| 313877 | 2004 GS_{49} | — | April 12, 2004 | Kitt Peak | Spacewatch | · | 1.5 km | MPC · JPL |
| 313878 | 2004 GU_{73} | — | April 2, 2004 | Haleakala | NEAT | · | 1.8 km | MPC · JPL |
| 313879 | 2004 GT_{77} | — | April 15, 2004 | Socorro | LINEAR | · | 2.6 km | MPC · JPL |
| 313880 | 2004 GB_{78} | — | April 13, 2004 | Palomar | NEAT | · | 2.2 km | MPC · JPL |
| 313881 | 2004 HX | — | April 16, 2004 | Socorro | LINEAR | · | 3.6 km | MPC · JPL |
| 313882 | 2004 HX_{2} | — | April 16, 2004 | Socorro | LINEAR | · | 1.2 km | MPC · JPL |
| 313883 | 2004 HU_{8} | — | April 16, 2004 | Socorro | LINEAR | · | 1.8 km | MPC · JPL |
| 313884 | 2004 HU_{15} | — | April 16, 2004 | Kitt Peak | Spacewatch | · | 1.4 km | MPC · JPL |
| 313885 | 2004 HU_{37} | — | April 22, 2004 | Kitt Peak | Spacewatch | · | 1.8 km | MPC · JPL |
| 313886 | 2004 HO_{46} | — | April 22, 2004 | Kitt Peak | Spacewatch | · | 1.2 km | MPC · JPL |
| 313887 | 2004 HH_{48} | — | April 22, 2004 | Siding Spring | SSS | · | 2.1 km | MPC · JPL |
| 313888 | 2004 HK_{48} | — | April 22, 2004 | Siding Spring | SSS | · | 2.5 km | MPC · JPL |
| 313889 | 2004 HD_{62} | — | April 26, 2004 | Siding Spring | SSS | · | 2.7 km | MPC · JPL |
| 313890 | 2004 HJ_{66} | — | April 20, 2004 | Kitt Peak | Spacewatch | · | 2.3 km | MPC · JPL |
| 313891 | 2004 HW_{70} | — | April 24, 2004 | Socorro | LINEAR | · | 2.8 km | MPC · JPL |
| 313892 Furnish | 2004 JF | Furnish | May 8, 2004 | Wrightwood | J. W. Young | · | 1.7 km | MPC · JPL |
| 313893 | 2004 JO_{10} | — | May 12, 2004 | Catalina | CSS | RAF | 1.5 km | MPC · JPL |
| 313894 | 2004 JT_{47} | — | May 13, 2004 | Kitt Peak | Spacewatch | · | 1.8 km | MPC · JPL |
| 313895 | 2004 KA_{16} | — | May 24, 2004 | Socorro | LINEAR | · | 3.1 km | MPC · JPL |
| 313896 | 2004 KY_{18} | — | May 21, 2004 | Campo Imperatore | CINEOS | L4 | 15 km | MPC · JPL |
| 313897 | 2004 LX_{3} | — | June 11, 2004 | Socorro | LINEAR | · | 2.1 km | MPC · JPL |
| 313898 | 2004 LD_{4} | — | June 10, 2004 | Anderson Mesa | LONEOS | · | 3.3 km | MPC · JPL |
| 313899 | 2004 LR_{4} | — | June 11, 2004 | Kitt Peak | Spacewatch | · | 2.6 km | MPC · JPL |
| 313900 | 2004 ND_{3} | — | July 12, 2004 | Reedy Creek | J. Broughton | · | 2.6 km | MPC · JPL |

== 313901–314000 ==
back to top

| Designation | | | Discovery | | | Properties | | Ref |
| Permanent | Provisional | Named after | Date | Site | Discoverer(s) | Category | Diam. | Ref |
|---|---|---|---|---|---|---|---|---|
| 313901 | 2004 NA_{6} | — | July 11, 2004 | Socorro | LINEAR | · | 2.5 km | MPC · JPL |
| 313902 | 2004 NE_{12} | — | July 11, 2004 | Socorro | LINEAR | EUN | 1.6 km | MPC · JPL |
| 313903 | 2004 NH_{19} | — | July 14, 2004 | Socorro | LINEAR | · | 2.8 km | MPC · JPL |
| 313904 | 2004 NE_{23} | — | July 11, 2004 | Socorro | LINEAR | · | 3.9 km | MPC · JPL |
| 313905 | 2004 NB_{29} | — | July 14, 2004 | Socorro | LINEAR | · | 4.9 km | MPC · JPL |
| 313906 | 2004 PP_{1} | — | August 7, 2004 | Charleston | R. Holmes | · | 3.6 km | MPC · JPL |
| 313907 | 2004 PO_{26} | — | August 9, 2004 | Bergisch Gladbach | W. Bickel | · | 3.0 km | MPC · JPL |
| 313908 | 2004 PO_{29} | — | August 7, 2004 | Palomar | NEAT | · | 3.1 km | MPC · JPL |
| 313909 | 2004 PF_{49} | — | August 8, 2004 | Palomar | NEAT | · | 4.2 km | MPC · JPL |
| 313910 | 2004 PO_{63} | — | August 10, 2004 | Socorro | LINEAR | EOS | 2.8 km | MPC · JPL |
| 313911 | 2004 PE_{72} | — | August 8, 2004 | Socorro | LINEAR | · | 2.9 km | MPC · JPL |
| 313912 | 2004 PY_{79} | — | August 9, 2004 | Socorro | LINEAR | · | 2.7 km | MPC · JPL |
| 313913 | 2004 PP_{82} | — | August 10, 2004 | Socorro | LINEAR | · | 3.4 km | MPC · JPL |
| 313914 | 2004 PF_{103} | — | August 12, 2004 | Socorro | LINEAR | · | 1.0 km | MPC · JPL |
| 313915 | 2004 PW_{108} | — | August 10, 2004 | Socorro | LINEAR | · | 740 m | MPC · JPL |
| 313916 | 2004 PS_{117} | — | August 9, 2004 | Palomar | NEAT | · | 4.8 km | MPC · JPL |
| 313917 | 2004 QO_{7} | — | August 22, 2004 | Bergisch Gladbach | W. Bickel | · | 3.5 km | MPC · JPL |
| 313918 | 2004 QC_{22} | — | August 24, 2004 | Socorro | LINEAR | T_{j} (2.97) | 5.2 km | MPC · JPL |
| 313919 | 2004 RB | — | August 21, 2004 | Siding Spring | SSS | EOS | 2.1 km | MPC · JPL |
| 313920 | 2004 RQ | — | September 3, 2004 | Palomar | NEAT | · | 3.5 km | MPC · JPL |
| 313921 Daassou | 2004 RP_{1} | Daassou | September 5, 2004 | Vicques | M. Ory | · | 2.6 km | MPC · JPL |
| 313922 | 2004 RG_{7} | — | September 5, 2004 | Palomar | NEAT | TIR | 4.2 km | MPC · JPL |
| 313923 | 2004 RK_{17} | — | September 7, 2004 | Kitt Peak | Spacewatch | EOS | 2.3 km | MPC · JPL |
| 313924 | 2004 RA_{26} | — | September 4, 2004 | Palomar | NEAT | · | 3.7 km | MPC · JPL |
| 313925 | 2004 RY_{36} | — | September 7, 2004 | Kitt Peak | Spacewatch | · | 2.6 km | MPC · JPL |
| 313926 | 2004 RM_{59} | — | September 8, 2004 | Socorro | LINEAR | · | 4.5 km | MPC · JPL |
| 313927 | 2004 RQ_{59} | — | September 8, 2004 | Socorro | LINEAR | · | 4.7 km | MPC · JPL |
| 313928 | 2004 RM_{60} | — | September 8, 2004 | Socorro | LINEAR | · | 3.4 km | MPC · JPL |
| 313929 | 2004 RN_{81} | — | September 8, 2004 | Socorro | LINEAR | · | 5.3 km | MPC · JPL |
| 313930 | 2004 RF_{85} | — | September 7, 2004 | Bergisch Gladbach | W. Bickel | · | 3.8 km | MPC · JPL |
| 313931 | 2004 RT_{90} | — | September 8, 2004 | Socorro | LINEAR | · | 3.1 km | MPC · JPL |
| 313932 | 2004 RQ_{92} | — | September 8, 2004 | Socorro | LINEAR | · | 2.6 km | MPC · JPL |
| 313933 | 2004 RH_{95} | — | September 8, 2004 | Socorro | LINEAR | · | 2.9 km | MPC · JPL |
| 313934 | 2004 RL_{95} | — | September 8, 2004 | Socorro | LINEAR | EOS | 2.2 km | MPC · JPL |
| 313935 | 2004 RN_{97} | — | September 8, 2004 | Socorro | LINEAR | · | 2.5 km | MPC · JPL |
| 313936 | 2004 RS_{98} | — | September 8, 2004 | Socorro | LINEAR | · | 3.5 km | MPC · JPL |
| 313937 | 2004 RP_{99} | — | September 8, 2004 | Socorro | LINEAR | · | 2.7 km | MPC · JPL |
| 313938 | 2004 RB_{101} | — | September 8, 2004 | Socorro | LINEAR | · | 4.1 km | MPC · JPL |
| 313939 | 2004 RH_{101} | — | September 8, 2004 | Socorro | LINEAR | · | 3.6 km | MPC · JPL |
| 313940 | 2004 RN_{128} | — | September 7, 2004 | Kitt Peak | Spacewatch | · | 3.6 km | MPC · JPL |
| 313941 | 2004 RV_{147} | — | September 9, 2004 | Socorro | LINEAR | · | 3.0 km | MPC · JPL |
| 313942 | 2004 RW_{147} | — | September 9, 2004 | Socorro | LINEAR | · | 3.9 km | MPC · JPL |
| 313943 | 2004 RR_{151} | — | September 9, 2004 | Kitt Peak | Spacewatch | · | 2.5 km | MPC · JPL |
| 313944 | 2004 RZ_{155} | — | September 10, 2004 | Socorro | LINEAR | · | 4.5 km | MPC · JPL |
| 313945 | 2004 RN_{159} | — | September 10, 2004 | Socorro | LINEAR | EOS | 2.0 km | MPC · JPL |
| 313946 | 2004 RR_{159} | — | September 10, 2004 | Socorro | LINEAR | · | 5.2 km | MPC · JPL |
| 313947 | 2004 RO_{177} | — | September 10, 2004 | Socorro | LINEAR | · | 2.7 km | MPC · JPL |
| 313948 | 2004 RK_{178} | — | September 10, 2004 | Socorro | LINEAR | · | 4.1 km | MPC · JPL |
| 313949 | 2004 RJ_{180} | — | September 10, 2004 | Socorro | LINEAR | · | 2.9 km | MPC · JPL |
| 313950 | 2004 RV_{182} | — | September 10, 2004 | Socorro | LINEAR | · | 1.0 km | MPC · JPL |
| 313951 | 2004 RQ_{195} | — | September 10, 2004 | Socorro | LINEAR | · | 5.2 km | MPC · JPL |
| 313952 | 2004 RT_{197} | — | September 10, 2004 | Socorro | LINEAR | EOS | 2.8 km | MPC · JPL |
| 313953 | 2004 RX_{198} | — | September 10, 2004 | Socorro | LINEAR | · | 4.3 km | MPC · JPL |
| 313954 | 2004 RC_{204} | — | September 12, 2004 | Socorro | LINEAR | · | 3.3 km | MPC · JPL |
| 313955 | 2004 RF_{215} | — | September 11, 2004 | Socorro | LINEAR | · | 3.8 km | MPC · JPL |
| 313956 | 2004 RB_{237} | — | September 10, 2004 | Kitt Peak | Spacewatch | EOS | 2.2 km | MPC · JPL |
| 313957 | 2004 RJ_{250} | — | September 13, 2004 | Socorro | LINEAR | · | 2.9 km | MPC · JPL |
| 313958 | 2004 RT_{255} | — | September 6, 2004 | Palomar | NEAT | · | 4.3 km | MPC · JPL |
| 313959 | 2004 RB_{272} | — | September 11, 2004 | Kitt Peak | Spacewatch | VER | 2.6 km | MPC · JPL |
| 313960 | 2004 RH_{301} | — | September 11, 2004 | Kitt Peak | Spacewatch | · | 2.2 km | MPC · JPL |
| 313961 | 2004 RM_{307} | — | September 13, 2004 | Socorro | LINEAR | · | 5.3 km | MPC · JPL |
| 313962 | 2004 RT_{312} | — | September 15, 2004 | Socorro | LINEAR | T_{j} (2.98) | 4.9 km | MPC · JPL |
| 313963 | 2004 RS_{338} | — | September 7, 2004 | Kitt Peak | Spacewatch | · | 3.3 km | MPC · JPL |
| 313964 | 2004 RL_{340} | — | September 6, 2004 | Socorro | LINEAR | · | 7.4 km | MPC · JPL |
| 313965 | 2004 RQ_{343} | — | September 14, 2004 | Socorro | LINEAR | · | 5.3 km | MPC · JPL |
| 313966 | 2004 RJ_{346} | — | September 8, 2004 | Socorro | LINEAR | · | 4.3 km | MPC · JPL |
| 313967 | 2004 SN_{1} | — | September 16, 2004 | Kitt Peak | Spacewatch | · | 3.0 km | MPC · JPL |
| 313968 | 2004 SF_{29} | — | September 17, 2004 | Socorro | LINEAR | · | 3.3 km | MPC · JPL |
| 313969 | 2004 SF_{38} | — | September 17, 2004 | Kitt Peak | Spacewatch | · | 2.9 km | MPC · JPL |
| 313970 | 2004 SG_{59} | — | September 18, 2004 | Socorro | LINEAR | · | 920 m | MPC · JPL |
| 313971 | 2004 TZ_{1} | — | September 10, 2004 | Socorro | LINEAR | · | 3.5 km | MPC · JPL |
| 313972 | 2004 TL_{6} | — | October 2, 2004 | Palomar | NEAT | LIX | 5.0 km | MPC · JPL |
| 313973 | 2004 TD_{11} | — | October 8, 2004 | Socorro | LINEAR | · | 3.8 km | MPC · JPL |
| 313974 | 2004 TW_{56} | — | October 5, 2004 | Kitt Peak | Spacewatch | · | 720 m | MPC · JPL |
| 313975 | 2004 TU_{58} | — | October 5, 2004 | Kitt Peak | Spacewatch | · | 2.0 km | MPC · JPL |
| 313976 | 2004 TF_{61} | — | October 5, 2004 | Anderson Mesa | LONEOS | · | 700 m | MPC · JPL |
| 313977 | 2004 TQ_{62} | — | October 5, 2004 | Kitt Peak | Spacewatch | · | 690 m | MPC · JPL |
| 313978 | 2004 TZ_{65} | — | October 5, 2004 | Anderson Mesa | LONEOS | V | 940 m | MPC · JPL |
| 313979 | 2004 TN_{78} | — | October 4, 2004 | Socorro | LINEAR | fast | 4.9 km | MPC · JPL |
| 313980 | 2004 TW_{79} | — | October 5, 2004 | Kitt Peak | Spacewatch | · | 3.3 km | MPC · JPL |
| 313981 | 2004 TJ_{80} | — | October 5, 2004 | Kitt Peak | Spacewatch | · | 2.5 km | MPC · JPL |
| 313982 | 2004 TU_{84} | — | October 5, 2004 | Kitt Peak | Spacewatch | · | 4.4 km | MPC · JPL |
| 313983 | 2004 TX_{90} | — | October 5, 2004 | Kitt Peak | Spacewatch | · | 3.5 km | MPC · JPL |
| 313984 | 2004 TY_{93} | — | October 5, 2004 | Kitt Peak | Spacewatch | · | 5.3 km | MPC · JPL |
| 313985 | 2004 TG_{102} | — | October 6, 2004 | Palomar | NEAT | EMA | 4.2 km | MPC · JPL |
| 313986 | 2004 TQ_{119} | — | September 15, 2004 | Socorro | LINEAR | · | 4.0 km | MPC · JPL |
| 313987 | 2004 TV_{124} | — | October 7, 2004 | Socorro | LINEAR | · | 3.7 km | MPC · JPL |
| 313988 | 2004 TR_{133} | — | October 7, 2004 | Anderson Mesa | LONEOS | · | 1.6 km | MPC · JPL |
| 313989 | 2004 TZ_{138} | — | October 9, 2004 | Anderson Mesa | LONEOS | · | 4.0 km | MPC · JPL |
| 313990 | 2004 TT_{147} | — | October 6, 2004 | Kitt Peak | Spacewatch | · | 3.7 km | MPC · JPL |
| 313991 | 2004 TW_{171} | — | October 8, 2004 | Socorro | LINEAR | · | 4.4 km | MPC · JPL |
| 313992 | 2004 TA_{183} | — | October 7, 2004 | Kitt Peak | Spacewatch | · | 4.4 km | MPC · JPL |
| 313993 | 2004 TZ_{194} | — | October 7, 2004 | Kitt Peak | Spacewatch | · | 4.1 km | MPC · JPL |
| 313994 | 2004 TQ_{201} | — | October 7, 2004 | Kitt Peak | Spacewatch | · | 720 m | MPC · JPL |
| 313995 | 2004 TV_{210} | — | October 8, 2004 | Kitt Peak | Spacewatch | · | 880 m | MPC · JPL |
| 313996 | 2004 TE_{225} | — | October 8, 2004 | Kitt Peak | Spacewatch | · | 2.7 km | MPC · JPL |
| 313997 | 2004 TG_{255} | — | October 9, 2004 | Kitt Peak | Spacewatch | · | 650 m | MPC · JPL |
| 313998 | 2004 TM_{261} | — | October 9, 2004 | Kitt Peak | Spacewatch | · | 3.6 km | MPC · JPL |
| 313999 | 2004 TY_{336} | — | October 11, 2004 | Kitt Peak | Spacewatch | · | 930 m | MPC · JPL |
| 314000 | 2004 TN_{346} | — | October 15, 2004 | Anderson Mesa | LONEOS | · | 5.2 km | MPC · JPL |

back to top

== See also ==
- Meanings of minor-planet names: 313001–314000
