= List of minor planets: 315001–316000 =

The following is a partial list of minor planets, running from minor-planet number 315001 through 316000, inclusive. The primary data for this and other partial lists is based on JPL's "Small-Body Orbital Elements" and data available from the Minor Planet Center. Critical list information is also provided by the MPC, unless otherwise specified from Lowell Observatory. A detailed description of the table's columns and additional sources are given on the main page including a complete list of every page in this series, and a statistical break-up on the dynamical classification of minor planets.

Also see the summary list of all named bodies in numerical and alphabetical order, and the corresponding naming citations for the number range of this particular list. New namings may only be added to this list after official publication, as the preannouncement of names is condemned by the Working Group for Small Bodies Nomenclature of the International Astronomical Union.

Near-Earth obj.	MBA (inner)	MBA (outer)	Centaur
Mars-crosser	MBA (middle)	Jupiter trojan	Trans-Neptunian obj.
Unclassified

== 315001–315100 ==
Designation			Discovery			Properties		Ref
Permanent	Provisional	Named after	Date	Site	Discoverer(s)	Category	Diam.	Ref
315001	2007 AD_{25}	—	January 15, 2007	Catalina	CSS	·	1.9 km	MPC · JPL
315002	2007 AP_{27}	—	January 9, 2007	Mount Lemmon	Mount Lemmon Survey	·	2.0 km	MPC · JPL
315003	2007 AS_{27}	—	January 10, 2007	Kitt Peak	Spacewatch	·	3.5 km	MPC · JPL
315004	2007 AE_{28}	—	January 8, 2007	Mount Lemmon	Mount Lemmon Survey	EOS	2.3 km	MPC · JPL
315005	2007 BE	—	January 16, 2007	Anderson Mesa	LONEOS	H	650 m	MPC · JPL
315006	2007 BA_{1}	—	January 16, 2007	Mount Lemmon	Mount Lemmon Survey	·	3.2 km	MPC · JPL
315007	2007 BE_{8}	—	January 24, 2007	Mount Lemmon	Mount Lemmon Survey	·	2.0 km	MPC · JPL
315008	2007 BP_{10}	—	January 17, 2007	Palomar	NEAT	·	2.0 km	MPC · JPL
315009	2007 BL_{17}	—	January 17, 2007	Palomar	NEAT	·	1.9 km	MPC · JPL
315010	2007 BR_{23}	—	January 24, 2007	Mount Lemmon	Mount Lemmon Survey	EOS	1.8 km	MPC · JPL
315011	2007 BO_{30}	—	January 24, 2007	Catalina	CSS	TIR	3.9 km	MPC · JPL
315012 Hutchings	2007 BD_{31}	Hutchings	January 20, 2007	Mauna Kea	D. D. Balam	·	2.0 km	MPC · JPL
315013	2007 BX_{33}	—	January 24, 2007	Mount Lemmon	Mount Lemmon Survey	EOS	2.1 km	MPC · JPL
315014	2007 BD_{35}	—	January 24, 2007	Mount Lemmon	Mount Lemmon Survey	·	2.5 km	MPC · JPL
315015	2007 BB_{38}	—	January 24, 2007	Mount Lemmon	Mount Lemmon Survey	KOR	1.5 km	MPC · JPL
315016	2007 BX_{38}	—	January 24, 2007	Catalina	CSS	BRA	1.8 km	MPC · JPL
315017	2007 BH_{44}	—	January 24, 2007	Catalina	CSS	H	720 m	MPC · JPL
315018	2007 BA_{48}	—	January 26, 2007	Kitt Peak	Spacewatch	·	3.3 km	MPC · JPL
315019	2007 BW_{48}	—	January 26, 2007	Kitt Peak	Spacewatch	·	2.4 km	MPC · JPL
315020	2007 BG_{49}	—	January 28, 2007	Kitt Peak	Spacewatch	AMO	640 m	MPC · JPL
315021	2007 BG_{57}	—	January 24, 2007	Socorro	LINEAR	·	2.3 km	MPC · JPL
315022	2007 BE_{58}	—	January 24, 2007	Catalina	CSS	·	3.8 km	MPC · JPL
315023	2007 BG_{62}	—	January 27, 2007	Mount Lemmon	Mount Lemmon Survey	·	1.9 km	MPC · JPL
315024	2007 BA_{64}	—	January 27, 2007	Mount Lemmon	Mount Lemmon Survey	·	3.2 km	MPC · JPL
315025	2007 BE_{66}	—	January 27, 2007	Mount Lemmon	Mount Lemmon Survey	·	3.8 km	MPC · JPL
315026	2007 BD_{69}	—	January 27, 2007	Mount Lemmon	Mount Lemmon Survey	·	4.2 km	MPC · JPL
315027	2007 BT_{69}	—	January 27, 2007	Mount Lemmon	Mount Lemmon Survey	·	1.6 km	MPC · JPL
315028	2007 BK_{74}	—	January 17, 2007	Kitt Peak	Spacewatch	EOS	2.0 km	MPC · JPL
315029	2007 BT_{74}	—	January 26, 2007	Kitt Peak	Spacewatch	·	2.2 km	MPC · JPL
315030	2007 BR_{77}	—	January 25, 2007	Kitt Peak	Spacewatch	SYL · CYB	4.0 km	MPC · JPL
315031	2007 BA_{78}	—	January 27, 2007	Mount Lemmon	Mount Lemmon Survey	·	3.2 km	MPC · JPL
315032	2007 CF_{4}	—	February 6, 2007	Kitt Peak	Spacewatch	·	2.9 km	MPC · JPL
315033	2007 CE_{8}	—	February 6, 2007	Kitt Peak	Spacewatch	·	2.3 km	MPC · JPL
315034	2007 CG_{17}	—	January 27, 2007	Kitt Peak	Spacewatch	·	1.9 km	MPC · JPL
315035	2007 CL_{19}	—	February 5, 2007	Palomar	NEAT	·	4.5 km	MPC · JPL
315036	2007 CH_{21}	—	February 6, 2007	Palomar	NEAT	EOS	2.0 km	MPC · JPL
315037	2007 CL_{22}	—	February 6, 2007	Mount Lemmon	Mount Lemmon Survey	·	2.7 km	MPC · JPL
315038	2007 CO_{23}	—	February 7, 2007	Mount Lemmon	Mount Lemmon Survey	KOR	1.3 km	MPC · JPL
315039	2007 CV_{24}	—	February 8, 2007	Mount Lemmon	Mount Lemmon Survey	EOS	2.0 km	MPC · JPL
315040	2007 CR_{26}	—	February 9, 2007	Marly	P. Kocher	·	3.3 km	MPC · JPL
315041	2007 CF_{32}	—	February 6, 2007	Mount Lemmon	Mount Lemmon Survey	·	2.1 km	MPC · JPL
315042	2007 CE_{35}	—	February 6, 2007	Kitt Peak	Spacewatch	EOS	2.9 km	MPC · JPL
315043	2007 CO_{35}	—	February 6, 2007	Mount Lemmon	Mount Lemmon Survey	·	2.4 km	MPC · JPL
315044	2007 CR_{44}	—	February 8, 2007	Palomar	NEAT	·	3.4 km	MPC · JPL
315045	2007 CX_{48}	—	February 10, 2007	Mount Lemmon	Mount Lemmon Survey	·	1.8 km	MPC · JPL
315046 Gianniferrari	2007 CG_{51}	Gianniferrari	February 13, 2007	San Marcello	L. Tesi, Fagioli, G.	·	2.9 km	MPC · JPL
315047	2007 CW_{51}	—	January 17, 2007	Catalina	CSS	·	3.3 km	MPC · JPL
315048	2007 CG_{53}	—	February 13, 2007	Socorro	LINEAR	·	3.2 km	MPC · JPL
315049	2007 CX_{55}	—	February 13, 2007	Socorro	LINEAR	·	3.5 km	MPC · JPL
315050	2007 CR_{59}	—	January 26, 2007	Anderson Mesa	LONEOS	·	2.8 km	MPC · JPL
315051	2007 CW_{60}	—	February 10, 2007	Catalina	CSS	·	4.5 km	MPC · JPL
315052	2007 CF_{66}	—	February 10, 2007	Catalina	CSS	LIX	4.9 km	MPC · JPL
315053	2007 DZ	—	February 16, 2007	Calvin-Rehoboth	Calvin College	TIR	4.0 km	MPC · JPL
315054	2007 DP_{12}	—	February 16, 2007	Mount Lemmon	Mount Lemmon Survey	·	3.9 km	MPC · JPL
315055	2007 DM_{13}	—	February 16, 2007	Palomar	NEAT	EMA	5.6 km	MPC · JPL
315056	2007 DK_{14}	—	February 17, 2007	Kitt Peak	Spacewatch	EOS	1.9 km	MPC · JPL
315057	2007 DG_{16}	—	February 17, 2007	Kitt Peak	Spacewatch	EOS	2.4 km	MPC · JPL
315058	2007 DS_{17}	—	February 17, 2007	Kitt Peak	Spacewatch	·	2.4 km	MPC · JPL
315059	2007 DK_{20}	—	February 17, 2007	Kitt Peak	Spacewatch	·	2.4 km	MPC · JPL
315060	2007 DL_{28}	—	February 17, 2007	Kitt Peak	Spacewatch	·	3.3 km	MPC · JPL
315061	2007 DQ_{28}	—	February 17, 2007	Kitt Peak	Spacewatch	·	3.3 km	MPC · JPL
315062	2007 DW_{30}	—	February 17, 2007	Kitt Peak	Spacewatch	·	2.2 km	MPC · JPL
315063	2007 DP_{31}	—	February 17, 2007	Kitt Peak	Spacewatch	·	2.7 km	MPC · JPL
315064	2007 DS_{32}	—	February 17, 2007	Kitt Peak	Spacewatch	·	2.5 km	MPC · JPL
315065	2007 DC_{33}	—	February 17, 2007	Kitt Peak	Spacewatch	·	2.6 km	MPC · JPL
315066	2007 DL_{35}	—	February 17, 2007	Kitt Peak	Spacewatch	·	2.2 km	MPC · JPL
315067	2007 DD_{36}	—	February 17, 2007	Kitt Peak	Spacewatch	·	3.3 km	MPC · JPL
315068	2007 DE_{36}	—	February 17, 2007	Kitt Peak	Spacewatch	EOS	2.9 km	MPC · JPL
315069	2007 DW_{37}	—	February 17, 2007	Kitt Peak	Spacewatch	·	2.3 km	MPC · JPL
315070	2007 DH_{41}	—	February 19, 2007	Mount Lemmon	Mount Lemmon Survey	·	4.6 km	MPC · JPL
315071	2007 DY_{42}	—	February 17, 2007	Catalina	CSS	·	3.1 km	MPC · JPL
315072	2007 DH_{43}	—	November 20, 2006	Mount Lemmon	Mount Lemmon Survey	·	3.9 km	MPC · JPL
315073	2007 DZ_{45}	—	February 21, 2007	Mount Lemmon	Mount Lemmon Survey	VER	4.5 km	MPC · JPL
315074	2007 DC_{52}	—	February 17, 2007	Mount Lemmon	Mount Lemmon Survey	CYB	5.1 km	MPC · JPL
315075	2007 DO_{52}	—	February 19, 2007	Mount Lemmon	Mount Lemmon Survey	EOS	2.6 km	MPC · JPL
315076	2007 DS_{58}	—	February 21, 2007	Mount Lemmon	Mount Lemmon Survey	·	3.1 km	MPC · JPL
315077	2007 DT_{58}	—	February 21, 2007	Mount Lemmon	Mount Lemmon Survey	·	3.4 km	MPC · JPL
315078	2007 DQ_{59}	—	February 22, 2007	Anderson Mesa	LONEOS	·	4.5 km	MPC · JPL
315079	2007 DB_{60}	—	February 22, 2007	Socorro	LINEAR	·	4.4 km	MPC · JPL
315080	2007 DM_{65}	—	February 21, 2007	Kitt Peak	Spacewatch	ANF	1.4 km	MPC · JPL
315081	2007 DK_{69}	—	February 21, 2007	Kitt Peak	Spacewatch	·	2.0 km	MPC · JPL
315082	2007 DP_{70}	—	February 21, 2007	Kitt Peak	Spacewatch	·	2.1 km	MPC · JPL
315083	2007 DU_{70}	—	February 21, 2007	Kitt Peak	Spacewatch	EOS	2.5 km	MPC · JPL
315084	2007 DE_{71}	—	February 21, 2007	Kitt Peak	Spacewatch	·	1.8 km	MPC · JPL
315085	2007 DS_{71}	—	February 21, 2007	Kitt Peak	Spacewatch	·	2.6 km	MPC · JPL
315086	2007 DO_{81}	—	February 23, 2007	Mount Lemmon	Mount Lemmon Survey	EOS	2.0 km	MPC · JPL
315087	2007 DL_{83}	—	February 25, 2007	Mount Lemmon	Mount Lemmon Survey	·	4.0 km	MPC · JPL
315088 Daniels	2007 DT_{84}	Daniels	February 21, 2007	Charleston	R. Holmes	EOS	2.1 km	MPC · JPL
315089	2007 DC_{86}	—	January 27, 2007	Mount Lemmon	Mount Lemmon Survey	EOS	2.7 km	MPC · JPL
315090	2007 DS_{88}	—	February 23, 2007	Kitt Peak	Spacewatch	·	3.3 km	MPC · JPL
315091	2007 DL_{90}	—	February 23, 2007	Kitt Peak	Spacewatch	EOS	2.8 km	MPC · JPL
315092	2007 DJ_{91}	—	February 23, 2007	Mount Lemmon	Mount Lemmon Survey	·	3.3 km	MPC · JPL
315093	2007 DK_{91}	—	February 23, 2007	Mount Lemmon	Mount Lemmon Survey	EOS	1.9 km	MPC · JPL
315094	2007 DS_{91}	—	February 23, 2007	Mount Lemmon	Mount Lemmon Survey	·	3.6 km	MPC · JPL
315095	2007 DL_{99}	—	February 25, 2007	Mount Lemmon	Mount Lemmon Survey	·	3.5 km	MPC · JPL
315096	2007 DG_{112}	—	February 27, 2007	Kitt Peak	Spacewatch	·	3.2 km	MPC · JPL
315097	2007 DW_{116}	—	February 23, 2007	Catalina	CSS	·	4.4 km	MPC · JPL
315098	2007 EX	—	March 10, 2007	Siding Spring	SSS	ATE +1km	990 m	MPC · JPL
315099	2007 EK_{3}	—	March 9, 2007	Catalina	CSS	(5651)	4.4 km	MPC · JPL
315100	2007 EA_{4}	—	March 9, 2007	Kitt Peak	Spacewatch	·	4.6 km	MPC · JPL

== 315101–315200 ==
back to top

Designation			Discovery			Properties		Ref
Permanent	Provisional	Named after	Date	Site	Discoverer(s)	Category	Diam.	Ref
315101	2007 EU_{5}	—	March 9, 2007	Mount Lemmon	Mount Lemmon Survey	·	2.8 km	MPC · JPL
315102	2007 EO_{8}	—	March 9, 2007	Mount Lemmon	Mount Lemmon Survey	·	3.9 km	MPC · JPL
315103	2007 EX_{8}	—	March 9, 2007	Mount Lemmon	Mount Lemmon Survey	·	4.3 km	MPC · JPL
315104	2007 EP_{14}	—	November 17, 2006	Kitt Peak	Spacewatch	EOS	2.7 km	MPC · JPL
315105	2007 ET_{19}	—	March 10, 2007	Mount Lemmon	Mount Lemmon Survey	·	3.3 km	MPC · JPL
315106	2007 EQ_{21}	—	March 10, 2007	Palomar	NEAT	·	1.9 km	MPC · JPL
315107	2007 EX_{25}	—	March 11, 2007	Marly	P. Kocher	·	2.5 km	MPC · JPL
315108	2007 EY_{31}	—	March 10, 2007	Palomar	NEAT	EOS	2.4 km	MPC · JPL
315109	2007 EQ_{36}	—	March 11, 2007	Anderson Mesa	LONEOS	·	3.7 km	MPC · JPL
315110	2007 EL_{37}	—	March 11, 2007	Mount Lemmon	Mount Lemmon Survey	·	3.4 km	MPC · JPL
315111	2007 EU_{37}	—	March 11, 2007	Mount Lemmon	Mount Lemmon Survey	·	3.8 km	MPC · JPL
315112	2007 EB_{42}	—	March 9, 2007	Kitt Peak	Spacewatch	·	2.4 km	MPC · JPL
315113	2007 EK_{48}	—	March 9, 2007	Kitt Peak	Spacewatch	H	800 m	MPC · JPL
315114	2007 ED_{50}	—	March 10, 2007	Mount Lemmon	Mount Lemmon Survey	(159)	2.9 km	MPC · JPL
315115	2007 EJ_{51}	—	March 10, 2007	Palomar	NEAT	·	5.0 km	MPC · JPL
315116	2007 EX_{51}	—	March 11, 2007	Catalina	CSS	H	620 m	MPC · JPL
315117	2007 EL_{53}	—	March 11, 2007	Mount Lemmon	Mount Lemmon Survey	·	3.7 km	MPC · JPL
315118	2007 EU_{65}	—	March 10, 2007	Kitt Peak	Spacewatch	·	3.5 km	MPC · JPL
315119	2007 EC_{69}	—	March 10, 2007	Kitt Peak	Spacewatch	·	3.2 km	MPC · JPL
315120	2007 EM_{75}	—	March 10, 2007	Kitt Peak	Spacewatch	EMA	3.1 km	MPC · JPL
315121	2007 EW_{79}	—	March 10, 2007	Kitt Peak	Spacewatch	·	4.1 km	MPC · JPL
315122	2007 EG_{81}	—	March 11, 2007	Mount Lemmon	Mount Lemmon Survey	·	7.4 km	MPC · JPL
315123	2007 EE_{82}	—	March 11, 2007	Anderson Mesa	LONEOS	·	4.7 km	MPC · JPL
315124	2007 EG_{82}	—	March 11, 2007	Anderson Mesa	LONEOS	TIR	4.0 km	MPC · JPL
315125	2007 EV_{84}	—	March 12, 2007	Catalina	CSS	EOS	3.0 km	MPC · JPL
315126	2007 EC_{85}	—	March 12, 2007	Catalina	CSS	·	5.1 km	MPC · JPL
315127	2007 ES_{87}	—	March 12, 2007	Catalina	CSS	H	680 m	MPC · JPL
315128	2007 EE_{91}	—	March 9, 2007	Kitt Peak	Spacewatch	EUP	4.1 km	MPC · JPL
315129	2007 ED_{96}	—	March 10, 2007	Mount Lemmon	Mount Lemmon Survey	·	3.2 km	MPC · JPL
315130	2007 EO_{98}	—	February 26, 2007	Mount Lemmon	Mount Lemmon Survey	·	2.4 km	MPC · JPL
315131	2007 EH_{100}	—	March 11, 2007	Kitt Peak	Spacewatch	·	2.7 km	MPC · JPL
315132	2007 EM_{100}	—	March 11, 2007	Catalina	CSS	·	4.1 km	MPC · JPL
315133	2007 EV_{103}	—	February 23, 2007	Mount Lemmon	Mount Lemmon Survey	·	2.5 km	MPC · JPL
315134	2007 EU_{108}	—	March 11, 2007	Kitt Peak	Spacewatch	·	3.0 km	MPC · JPL
315135	2007 EJ_{112}	—	March 11, 2007	Kitt Peak	Spacewatch	·	4.7 km	MPC · JPL
315136	2007 EK_{113}	—	March 12, 2007	Kitt Peak	Spacewatch	·	1.8 km	MPC · JPL
315137	2007 EM_{113}	—	March 12, 2007	Kitt Peak	Spacewatch	EOS	1.8 km	MPC · JPL
315138	2007 EP_{122}	—	November 24, 2006	Mount Lemmon	Mount Lemmon Survey	·	3.5 km	MPC · JPL
315139	2007 EM_{126}	—	March 9, 2007	Kitt Peak	Spacewatch	·	2.7 km	MPC · JPL
315140	2007 EO_{129}	—	February 23, 2007	Mount Lemmon	Mount Lemmon Survey	THM	2.3 km	MPC · JPL
315141	2007 EZ_{144}	—	March 12, 2007	Mount Lemmon	Mount Lemmon Survey	·	3.6 km	MPC · JPL
315142	2007 EJ_{154}	—	March 12, 2007	Kitt Peak	Spacewatch	·	3.2 km	MPC · JPL
315143	2007 EU_{160}	—	March 14, 2007	Catalina	CSS	·	4.5 km	MPC · JPL
315144	2007 EC_{161}	—	March 14, 2007	Catalina	CSS	EUP	4.9 km	MPC · JPL
315145	2007 EU_{169}	—	March 13, 2007	Kitt Peak	Spacewatch	CYB	4.1 km	MPC · JPL
315146	2007 EA_{171}	—	March 15, 2007	Catalina	CSS	TIR	3.3 km	MPC · JPL
315147	2007 EO_{173}	—	March 14, 2007	Kitt Peak	Spacewatch	HYG	3.2 km	MPC · JPL
315148	2007 EJ_{183}	—	March 12, 2007	Mount Lemmon	Mount Lemmon Survey	·	1.7 km	MPC · JPL
315149	2007 EF_{213}	—	March 15, 2007	Siding Spring	SSS	·	4.6 km	MPC · JPL
315150	2007 EZ_{215}	—	March 12, 2007	Catalina	CSS	·	3.7 km	MPC · JPL
315151	2007 EH_{219}	—	March 14, 2007	Mount Lemmon	Mount Lemmon Survey	·	3.8 km	MPC · JPL
315152	2007 ET_{222}	—	March 10, 2007	Catalina	CSS	·	6.0 km	MPC · JPL
315153	2007 ED_{223}	—	March 12, 2007	Catalina	CSS	·	3.7 km	MPC · JPL
315154	2007 FC_{2}	—	March 16, 2007	Catalina	CSS	TIR	4.0 km	MPC · JPL
315155	2007 FC_{12}	—	March 17, 2007	Socorro	LINEAR	·	3.7 km	MPC · JPL
315156	2007 FL_{12}	—	March 17, 2007	Socorro	LINEAR	H	730 m	MPC · JPL
315157	2007 FQ_{13}	—	March 19, 2007	Mount Lemmon	Mount Lemmon Survey	HYG	3.2 km	MPC · JPL
315158	2007 FS_{18}	—	March 20, 2007	Mount Lemmon	Mount Lemmon Survey	·	4.3 km	MPC · JPL
315159	2007 FX_{22}	—	February 26, 2007	Mount Lemmon	Mount Lemmon Survey	·	3.4 km	MPC · JPL
315160	2007 FE_{23}	—	March 20, 2007	Kitt Peak	Spacewatch	·	3.6 km	MPC · JPL
315161	2007 FL_{23}	—	March 20, 2007	Kitt Peak	Spacewatch	THM	3.0 km	MPC · JPL
315162	2007 FL_{24}	—	November 12, 1999	Kitt Peak	Spacewatch	THM	2.6 km	MPC · JPL
315163	2007 FR_{30}	—	March 20, 2007	Mount Lemmon	Mount Lemmon Survey	·	4.4 km	MPC · JPL
315164	2007 FB_{32}	—	March 20, 2007	Kitt Peak	Spacewatch	·	3.4 km	MPC · JPL
315165	2007 FZ_{36}	—	March 26, 2007	Kitt Peak	Spacewatch	·	3.9 km	MPC · JPL
315166 Pawelmaksym	2007 GA_{4}	Pawelmaksym	April 6, 2007	Charleston	Astronomical Research Observatory	·	3.8 km	MPC · JPL
315167	2007 GE_{4}	—	April 11, 2007	Catalina	CSS	·	4.9 km	MPC · JPL
315168	2007 GE_{21}	—	April 11, 2007	Mount Lemmon	Mount Lemmon Survey	H	770 m	MPC · JPL
315169	2007 GH_{33}	—	April 11, 2007	Catalina	CSS	EUP	4.7 km	MPC · JPL
315170	2007 GW_{37}	—	April 14, 2007	Kitt Peak	Spacewatch	·	3.1 km	MPC · JPL
315171	2007 GB_{69}	—	April 15, 2007	Mount Lemmon	Mount Lemmon Survey	·	2.9 km	MPC · JPL
315172	2007 GY_{74}	—	January 3, 2006	Socorro	LINEAR	·	4.4 km	MPC · JPL
315173	2007 HS_{4}	—	April 18, 2007	Socorro	LINEAR	H	640 m	MPC · JPL
315174 Sellek	2007 HG_{5}	Sellek	March 20, 2007	Catalina	CSS	THB	5.2 km	MPC · JPL
315175	2007 HW_{14}	—	April 20, 2007	Wildberg	R. Apitzsch	H	760 m	MPC · JPL
315176	2007 HX_{41}	—	April 22, 2007	Mount Lemmon	Mount Lemmon Survey	·	2.9 km	MPC · JPL
315177	2007 HB_{47}	—	April 20, 2007	Mount Lemmon	Mount Lemmon Survey	·	3.3 km	MPC · JPL
315178	2007 HF_{64}	—	April 22, 2007	Mount Lemmon	Mount Lemmon Survey	·	2.0 km	MPC · JPL
315179	2007 HG_{78}	—	April 23, 2007	Catalina	CSS	EOS	2.8 km	MPC · JPL
315180	2007 HO_{80}	—	April 25, 2007	Mount Lemmon	Mount Lemmon Survey	·	2.2 km	MPC · JPL
315181	2007 HA_{90}	—	March 20, 2007	Anderson Mesa	LONEOS	·	4.7 km	MPC · JPL
315182	2007 JP_{36}	—	May 9, 2007	Mount Lemmon	Mount Lemmon Survey	·	2.4 km	MPC · JPL
315183	2007 JK_{42}	—	May 10, 2007	Catalina	CSS	H	840 m	MPC · JPL
315184	2007 JM_{42}	—	May 11, 2007	Catalina	CSS	·	5.4 km	MPC · JPL
315185	2007 KD_{1}	—	May 16, 2007	Mount Lemmon	Mount Lemmon Survey	H	660 m	MPC · JPL
315186 Schade	2007 LD_{30}	Schade	June 11, 2007	Mauna Kea	D. D. Balam	·	1.0 km	MPC · JPL
315187	2007 OS_{1}	—	July 19, 2007	La Sagra	OAM	·	2.1 km	MPC · JPL
315188	2007 PZ_{13}	—	August 8, 2007	Socorro	LINEAR	·	5.6 km	MPC · JPL
315189	2007 PQ_{20}	—	August 9, 2007	Socorro	LINEAR	·	810 m	MPC · JPL
315190	2007 PE_{22}	—	August 10, 2007	Kitt Peak	Spacewatch	·	1.1 km	MPC · JPL
315191	2007 PH_{22}	—	August 10, 2007	Kitt Peak	Spacewatch	·	780 m	MPC · JPL
315192	2007 PG_{27}	—	August 10, 2007	Tiki	S. F. Hönig, Teamo, N.	·	770 m	MPC · JPL
315193	2007 PZ_{36}	—	August 13, 2007	Socorro	LINEAR	·	810 m	MPC · JPL
315194	2007 PO_{37}	—	August 13, 2007	Socorro	LINEAR	·	830 m	MPC · JPL
315195	2007 PM_{40}	—	August 13, 2007	Socorro	LINEAR	L4	16 km	MPC · JPL
315196	2007 PG_{43}	—	August 9, 2007	Socorro	LINEAR	·	1.3 km	MPC · JPL
315197	2007 PF_{45}	—	August 10, 2007	Kitt Peak	Spacewatch	·	630 m	MPC · JPL
315198	2007 PB_{49}	—	August 12, 2007	Purple Mountain	PMO NEO Survey Program	·	670 m	MPC · JPL
315199	2007 QD	—	August 16, 2007	San Marcello	San Marcello	V	820 m	MPC · JPL
315200	2007 QQ_{9}	—	August 22, 2007	Socorro	LINEAR	·	930 m	MPC · JPL

== 315201–315300 ==
back to top

Designation			Discovery			Properties		Ref
Permanent	Provisional	Named after	Date	Site	Discoverer(s)	Category	Diam.	Ref
315201	2007 QX_{9}	—	August 22, 2007	Socorro	LINEAR	·	1.1 km	MPC · JPL
315202	2007 QN_{12}	—	August 23, 2007	Siding Spring	SSS	PHO	1.4 km	MPC · JPL
315203	2007 QK_{15}	—	August 24, 2007	Kitt Peak	Spacewatch	L4	9.4 km	MPC · JPL
315204	2007 QM_{15}	—	August 24, 2007	Kitt Peak	Spacewatch	L4	10 km	MPC · JPL
315205	2007 QO_{15}	—	August 24, 2007	Kitt Peak	Spacewatch	L4 · ERY	9.2 km	MPC · JPL
315206	2007 RQ_{1}	—	September 4, 2007	Mayhill	Lowe, A.	·	930 m	MPC · JPL
315207	2007 RP_{10}	—	September 3, 2007	Catalina	CSS	·	1.1 km	MPC · JPL
315208	2007 RS_{22}	—	September 3, 2007	Catalina	CSS	L4	13 km	MPC · JPL
315209	2007 RC_{37}	—	September 8, 2007	Mount Lemmon	Mount Lemmon Survey	·	940 m	MPC · JPL
315210	2007 RO_{48}	—	September 9, 2007	Mount Lemmon	Mount Lemmon Survey	·	680 m	MPC · JPL
315211	2007 RX_{52}	—	September 9, 2007	Kitt Peak	Spacewatch	·	860 m	MPC · JPL
315212	2007 RJ_{60}	—	September 10, 2007	Catalina	CSS	·	1.2 km	MPC · JPL
315213	2007 RL_{87}	—	September 10, 2007	Mount Lemmon	Mount Lemmon Survey	·	970 m	MPC · JPL
315214	2007 RV_{95}	—	September 10, 2007	Kitt Peak	Spacewatch	·	900 m	MPC · JPL
315215	2007 RL_{97}	—	September 10, 2007	Kitt Peak	Spacewatch	·	1.3 km	MPC · JPL
315216	2007 RM_{105}	—	September 11, 2007	Catalina	CSS	·	1.3 km	MPC · JPL
315217	2007 RJ_{108}	—	September 11, 2007	Kitt Peak	Spacewatch	NYS	760 m	MPC · JPL
315218 La Boétie	2007 RR_{133}	La Boétie	September 13, 2007	Saint-Sulpice	B. Christophe	V	850 m	MPC · JPL
315219	2007 RX_{137}	—	September 14, 2007	Anderson Mesa	LONEOS	·	740 m	MPC · JPL
315220	2007 RK_{140}	—	September 13, 2007	Socorro	LINEAR	·	860 m	MPC · JPL
315221	2007 RS_{148}	—	September 12, 2007	Catalina	CSS	·	850 m	MPC · JPL
315222	2007 RA_{149}	—	September 12, 2007	Catalina	CSS	·	840 m	MPC · JPL
315223	2007 RP_{154}	—	September 10, 2007	Catalina	CSS	·	820 m	MPC · JPL
315224	2007 RR_{154}	—	September 10, 2007	Mount Lemmon	Mount Lemmon Survey	L4	9.8 km	MPC · JPL
315225	2007 RO_{155}	—	September 10, 2007	Mount Lemmon	Mount Lemmon Survey	·	710 m	MPC · JPL
315226	2007 RN_{175}	—	September 10, 2007	Kitt Peak	Spacewatch	·	920 m	MPC · JPL
315227	2007 RB_{179}	—	September 10, 2007	Mount Lemmon	Mount Lemmon Survey	·	1.3 km	MPC · JPL
315228	2007 RC_{192}	—	September 11, 2007	Kitt Peak	Spacewatch	·	680 m	MPC · JPL
315229	2007 RW_{206}	—	September 10, 2007	Kitt Peak	Spacewatch	·	740 m	MPC · JPL
315230	2007 RA_{213}	—	September 12, 2007	Anderson Mesa	LONEOS	·	870 m	MPC · JPL
315231	2007 RX_{227}	—	September 10, 2007	Mount Lemmon	Mount Lemmon Survey	MAS	970 m	MPC · JPL
315232	2007 RY_{227}	—	September 10, 2007	Mount Lemmon	Mount Lemmon Survey	·	830 m	MPC · JPL
315233	2007 RG_{247}	—	September 12, 2007	Catalina	CSS	·	910 m	MPC · JPL
315234	2007 RP_{260}	—	September 14, 2007	Mount Lemmon	Mount Lemmon Survey	·	860 m	MPC · JPL
315235	2007 RH_{261}	—	September 14, 2007	Kitt Peak	Spacewatch	PHO	1.3 km	MPC · JPL
315236	2007 RX_{269}	—	September 15, 2007	Kitt Peak	Spacewatch	·	900 m	MPC · JPL
315237	2007 RW_{272}	—	September 15, 2007	Kitt Peak	Spacewatch	·	960 m	MPC · JPL
315238	2007 RK_{275}	—	August 14, 2007	Siding Spring	SSS	PHO	1.5 km	MPC · JPL
315239	2007 RB_{280}	—	September 10, 2007	Catalina	CSS	·	950 m	MPC · JPL
315240	2007 RP_{284}	—	September 11, 2007	Purple Mountain	PMO NEO Survey Program	·	750 m	MPC · JPL
315241	2007 RN_{290}	—	September 10, 2007	Mount Lemmon	Mount Lemmon Survey	NYS	990 m	MPC · JPL
315242	2007 RB_{291}	—	September 14, 2007	Mount Lemmon	Mount Lemmon Survey	MAS	630 m	MPC · JPL
315243	2007 RE_{296}	—	September 14, 2007	Mount Lemmon	Mount Lemmon Survey	MAS	610 m	MPC · JPL
315244	2007 RT_{296}	—	September 14, 2007	Mount Lemmon	Mount Lemmon Survey	·	1.0 km	MPC · JPL
315245	2007 RY_{298}	—	September 12, 2007	Catalina	CSS	·	1.1 km	MPC · JPL
315246	2007 RP_{300}	—	September 15, 2007	Lulin	LUSS	·	790 m	MPC · JPL
315247	2007 RO_{311}	—	September 12, 2007	Catalina	CSS	V	980 m	MPC · JPL
315248	2007 RX_{320}	—	September 10, 2007	Kitt Peak	Spacewatch	·	830 m	MPC · JPL
315249	2007 SS_{3}	—	September 16, 2007	Socorro	LINEAR	·	820 m	MPC · JPL
315250	2007 SR_{5}	—	September 19, 2007	Socorro	LINEAR	·	740 m	MPC · JPL
315251	2007 SJ_{11}	—	September 16, 2007	Taunus	E. Schwab, R. Kling	·	770 m	MPC · JPL
315252	2007 TW_{7}	—	October 7, 2007	Calvin-Rehoboth	L. A. Molnar	·	750 m	MPC · JPL
315253	2007 TY_{8}	—	October 6, 2007	Bergisch Gladbach	W. Bickel	·	1.2 km	MPC · JPL
315254	2007 TK_{10}	—	October 6, 2007	Socorro	LINEAR	MAS	1.1 km	MPC · JPL
315255	2007 TP_{10}	—	October 6, 2007	Socorro	LINEAR	·	930 m	MPC · JPL
315256	2007 TK_{12}	—	October 6, 2007	Socorro	LINEAR	·	1.3 km	MPC · JPL
315257	2007 TO_{14}	—	October 7, 2007	Altschwendt	W. Ries	·	670 m	MPC · JPL
315258	2007 TK_{18}	—	October 8, 2007	Goodricke-Pigott	R. A. Tucker	·	800 m	MPC · JPL
315259	2007 TO_{18}	—	October 8, 2007	Goodricke-Pigott	R. A. Tucker	(2076)	1.4 km	MPC · JPL
315260	2007 TN_{27}	—	October 4, 2007	Kitt Peak	Spacewatch	·	740 m	MPC · JPL
315261	2007 TM_{40}	—	October 6, 2007	Kitt Peak	Spacewatch	V	720 m	MPC · JPL
315262	2007 TE_{41}	—	October 6, 2007	Kitt Peak	Spacewatch	·	1.5 km	MPC · JPL
315263	2007 TA_{46}	—	October 7, 2007	Catalina	CSS	·	3.2 km	MPC · JPL
315264	2007 TQ_{46}	—	October 4, 2007	Kitt Peak	Spacewatch	·	1.0 km	MPC · JPL
315265	2007 TL_{48}	—	October 4, 2007	Kitt Peak	Spacewatch	·	1.3 km	MPC · JPL
315266	2007 TX_{57}	—	October 4, 2007	Kitt Peak	Spacewatch	·	810 m	MPC · JPL
315267	2007 TJ_{61}	—	October 7, 2007	Mount Lemmon	Mount Lemmon Survey	·	1.7 km	MPC · JPL
315268	2007 TR_{64}	—	October 7, 2007	Mount Lemmon	Mount Lemmon Survey	MAS	720 m	MPC · JPL
315269	2007 TM_{66}	—	October 10, 2007	Cordell-Lorenz	D. T. Durig	·	810 m	MPC · JPL
315270	2007 TP_{69}	—	October 14, 2007	Mayhill	Lowe, A.	·	880 m	MPC · JPL
315271	2007 TA_{76}	—	October 4, 2007	Kitt Peak	Spacewatch	·	940 m	MPC · JPL
315272	2007 TQ_{81}	—	October 7, 2007	Catalina	CSS	·	890 m	MPC · JPL
315273	2007 TO_{87}	—	October 8, 2007	Mount Lemmon	Mount Lemmon Survey	·	910 m	MPC · JPL
315274	2007 TX_{87}	—	October 8, 2007	Mount Lemmon	Mount Lemmon Survey	·	810 m	MPC · JPL
315275	2007 TJ_{90}	—	October 8, 2007	Mount Lemmon	Mount Lemmon Survey	·	1.2 km	MPC · JPL
315276 Yurigradovsky	2007 TK_{91}	Yurigradovsky	October 1, 2007	Andrushivka	Andrushivka	·	1.1 km	MPC · JPL
315277	2007 TT_{105}	—	October 15, 2007	Taunus	Karge, S., R. Kling	V	830 m	MPC · JPL
315278	2007 TS_{107}	—	October 4, 2007	Catalina	CSS	·	790 m	MPC · JPL
315279	2007 TP_{108}	—	October 7, 2007	Catalina	CSS	·	840 m	MPC · JPL
315280	2007 TD_{109}	—	October 7, 2007	Catalina	CSS	·	800 m	MPC · JPL
315281	2007 TG_{112}	—	October 8, 2007	Catalina	CSS	V	880 m	MPC · JPL
315282	2007 TG_{114}	—	October 8, 2007	Catalina	CSS	·	1.9 km	MPC · JPL
315283	2007 TM_{119}	—	October 9, 2007	Kitt Peak	Spacewatch	·	1.1 km	MPC · JPL
315284	2007 TW_{124}	—	October 6, 2007	Kitt Peak	Spacewatch	·	1.1 km	MPC · JPL
315285	2007 TG_{125}	—	October 6, 2007	Kitt Peak	Spacewatch	·	1.1 km	MPC · JPL
315286	2007 TM_{125}	—	October 6, 2007	Kitt Peak	Spacewatch	NYS	1.3 km	MPC · JPL
315287	2007 TK_{128}	—	October 6, 2007	Kitt Peak	Spacewatch	·	1.1 km	MPC · JPL
315288	2007 TL_{129}	—	October 6, 2007	Kitt Peak	Spacewatch	·	1.3 km	MPC · JPL
315289	2007 TH_{133}	—	October 7, 2007	Mount Lemmon	Mount Lemmon Survey	·	700 m	MPC · JPL
315290	2007 TN_{145}	—	October 6, 2007	Socorro	LINEAR	·	870 m	MPC · JPL
315291	2007 TJ_{147}	—	October 7, 2007	Socorro	LINEAR	·	2.1 km	MPC · JPL
315292	2007 TM_{148}	—	October 7, 2007	Socorro	LINEAR	·	900 m	MPC · JPL
315293	2007 TO_{155}	—	October 9, 2007	Socorro	LINEAR	·	800 m	MPC · JPL
315294	2007 TK_{156}	—	October 9, 2007	Socorro	LINEAR	V	970 m	MPC · JPL
315295	2007 TB_{157}	—	October 9, 2007	Socorro	LINEAR	·	770 m	MPC · JPL
315296	2007 TF_{157}	—	October 9, 2007	Socorro	LINEAR	·	1.5 km	MPC · JPL
315297	2007 TB_{158}	—	October 9, 2007	Socorro	LINEAR	·	910 m	MPC · JPL
315298	2007 TH_{160}	—	October 9, 2007	Socorro	LINEAR	·	2.7 km	MPC · JPL
315299	2007 TF_{163}	—	October 11, 2007	Socorro	LINEAR	(2076)	880 m	MPC · JPL
315300	2007 TQ_{169}	—	October 12, 2007	Socorro	LINEAR	·	1.4 km	MPC · JPL

== 315301–315400 ==
back to top

Designation			Discovery			Properties		Ref
Permanent	Provisional	Named after	Date	Site	Discoverer(s)	Category	Diam.	Ref
315301	2007 TA_{174}	—	October 4, 2007	Catalina	CSS	·	940 m	MPC · JPL
315302	2007 TV_{177}	—	October 6, 2007	Kitt Peak	Spacewatch	MAS	800 m	MPC · JPL
315303	2007 TM_{187}	—	October 13, 2007	Socorro	LINEAR	·	1 km	MPC · JPL
315304	2007 TS_{199}	—	October 8, 2007	Kitt Peak	Spacewatch	·	860 m	MPC · JPL
315305	2007 TO_{204}	—	October 8, 2007	Mount Lemmon	Mount Lemmon Survey	·	1.1 km	MPC · JPL
315306	2007 TN_{212}	—	October 7, 2007	Kitt Peak	Spacewatch	·	1.2 km	MPC · JPL
315307	2007 TE_{216}	—	October 7, 2007	Kitt Peak	Spacewatch	NYS	890 m	MPC · JPL
315308	2007 TO_{216}	—	October 7, 2007	Kitt Peak	Spacewatch	·	1.3 km	MPC · JPL
315309	2007 TF_{233}	—	October 8, 2007	Kitt Peak	Spacewatch	·	1.2 km	MPC · JPL
315310	2007 TE_{234}	—	October 8, 2007	Kitt Peak	Spacewatch	·	1.1 km	MPC · JPL
315311	2007 TX_{236}	—	October 9, 2007	Mount Lemmon	Mount Lemmon Survey	·	760 m	MPC · JPL
315312	2007 TU_{244}	—	October 8, 2007	Catalina	CSS	·	1.7 km	MPC · JPL
315313	2007 TL_{257}	—	October 10, 2007	Kitt Peak	Spacewatch	·	650 m	MPC · JPL
315314	2007 TC_{273}	—	October 9, 2007	Kitt Peak	Spacewatch	·	1.5 km	MPC · JPL
315315	2007 TS_{290}	—	October 12, 2007	Mount Lemmon	Mount Lemmon Survey	·	1.1 km	MPC · JPL
315316	2007 TJ_{296}	—	October 10, 2007	Mount Lemmon	Mount Lemmon Survey	·	840 m	MPC · JPL
315317	2007 TQ_{299}	—	October 12, 2007	Kitt Peak	Spacewatch	·	840 m	MPC · JPL
315318	2007 TU_{309}	—	October 10, 2007	Mount Lemmon	Mount Lemmon Survey	NYS	1.2 km	MPC · JPL
315319	2007 TH_{317}	—	October 12, 2007	Kitt Peak	Spacewatch	·	1.3 km	MPC · JPL
315320	2007 TY_{332}	—	October 11, 2007	Kitt Peak	Spacewatch	·	820 m	MPC · JPL
315321	2007 TW_{333}	—	October 11, 2007	Kitt Peak	Spacewatch	·	760 m	MPC · JPL
315322	2007 TB_{347}	—	October 13, 2007	Mount Lemmon	Mount Lemmon Survey	·	910 m	MPC · JPL
315323	2007 TD_{353}	—	October 8, 2007	Mount Lemmon	Mount Lemmon Survey	·	1.2 km	MPC · JPL
315324	2007 TP_{354}	—	October 10, 2007	Catalina	CSS	·	1.7 km	MPC · JPL
315325	2007 TP_{367}	—	October 10, 2007	Anderson Mesa	LONEOS	·	1.2 km	MPC · JPL
315326	2007 TJ_{368}	—	October 10, 2007	Mount Lemmon	Mount Lemmon Survey	NYS	1.6 km	MPC · JPL
315327	2007 TK_{373}	—	October 14, 2007	Kitt Peak	Spacewatch	·	830 m	MPC · JPL
315328	2007 TQ_{379}	—	October 13, 2007	Mount Lemmon	Mount Lemmon Survey	·	930 m	MPC · JPL
315329	2007 TQ_{380}	—	October 14, 2007	Kitt Peak	Spacewatch	·	940 m	MPC · JPL
315330	2007 TC_{381}	—	October 14, 2007	Kitt Peak	Spacewatch	MAS	830 m	MPC · JPL
315331	2007 TD_{392}	—	October 15, 2007	Catalina	CSS	·	850 m	MPC · JPL
315332	2007 TW_{392}	—	October 15, 2007	Kitt Peak	Spacewatch	NYS	1.3 km	MPC · JPL
315333	2007 TK_{393}	—	October 13, 2007	Catalina	CSS	·	1.8 km	MPC · JPL
315334	2007 TC_{411}	—	October 13, 2007	Catalina	CSS	·	1.3 km	MPC · JPL
315335	2007 TH_{411}	—	October 13, 2007	Catalina	CSS	·	930 m	MPC · JPL
315336	2007 TM_{418}	—	October 4, 2007	Kitt Peak	Spacewatch	·	1.6 km	MPC · JPL
315337	2007 TH_{419}	—	October 11, 2007	Kitt Peak	Spacewatch	V	800 m	MPC · JPL
315338	2007 TO_{419}	—	October 15, 2007	Kitt Peak	Spacewatch	·	910 m	MPC · JPL
315339	2007 TQ_{441}	—	February 15, 2002	Haleakala	NEAT	V	880 m	MPC · JPL
315340	2007 TP_{445}	—	October 6, 2007	Kitt Peak	Spacewatch	·	810 m	MPC · JPL
315341	2007 TU_{445}	—	October 7, 2007	Kitt Peak	Spacewatch	·	830 m	MPC · JPL
315342	2007 TF_{451}	—	October 15, 2007	Mount Lemmon	Mount Lemmon Survey	·	1.5 km	MPC · JPL
315343	2007 UW_{2}	—	October 16, 2007	7300	W. K. Y. Yeung	·	860 m	MPC · JPL
315344	2007 UO_{4}	—	October 16, 2007	Bisei SG Center	BATTeRS	·	1.1 km	MPC · JPL
315345	2007 UE_{10}	—	October 17, 2007	Anderson Mesa	LONEOS	V	920 m	MPC · JPL
315346	2007 UT_{10}	—	October 18, 2007	Anderson Mesa	LONEOS	·	910 m	MPC · JPL
315347	2007 UA_{11}	—	October 19, 2007	Anderson Mesa	LONEOS	·	1.7 km	MPC · JPL
315348	2007 UB_{11}	—	October 19, 2007	Anderson Mesa	LONEOS	·	950 m	MPC · JPL
315349	2007 UO_{11}	—	October 19, 2007	Socorro	LINEAR	NYS	1.3 km	MPC · JPL
315350	2007 UN_{13}	—	October 16, 2007	Kitt Peak	Spacewatch	MAS	780 m	MPC · JPL
315351	2007 UX_{14}	—	October 17, 2007	Catalina	CSS	·	2.0 km	MPC · JPL
315352	2007 UY_{28}	—	October 18, 2007	Kitt Peak	Spacewatch	·	1.1 km	MPC · JPL
315353	2007 UL_{44}	—	October 18, 2007	Mount Lemmon	Mount Lemmon Survey	·	910 m	MPC · JPL
315354	2007 UP_{45}	—	October 19, 2007	Kitt Peak	Spacewatch	·	720 m	MPC · JPL
315355	2007 UG_{46}	—	October 20, 2007	Catalina	CSS	NYS	1.0 km	MPC · JPL
315356	2007 UV_{54}	—	October 30, 2007	Kitt Peak	Spacewatch	·	1.1 km	MPC · JPL
315357	2007 UR_{57}	—	October 30, 2007	Mount Lemmon	Mount Lemmon Survey	·	740 m	MPC · JPL
315358	2007 UG_{58}	—	October 30, 2007	Mount Lemmon	Mount Lemmon Survey	·	990 m	MPC · JPL
315359	2007 UC_{65}	—	October 30, 2007	Mount Lemmon	Mount Lemmon Survey	MAS	660 m	MPC · JPL
315360	2007 UY_{71}	—	October 31, 2007	Kitt Peak	Spacewatch	·	750 m	MPC · JPL
315361	2007 UY_{78}	—	October 30, 2007	Mount Lemmon	Mount Lemmon Survey	·	1.1 km	MPC · JPL
315362	2007 UQ_{101}	—	October 30, 2007	Kitt Peak	Spacewatch	NYS	1.1 km	MPC · JPL
315363	2007 UZ_{127}	—	October 20, 2007	Mount Lemmon	Mount Lemmon Survey	·	1.2 km	MPC · JPL
315364	2007 UC_{142}	—	October 26, 2007	Mount Lemmon	Mount Lemmon Survey	·	2.1 km	MPC · JPL
315365	2007 VB	—	November 1, 2007	Mayhill	Lowe, A.	NYS	1.4 km	MPC · JPL
315366	2007 VU_{1}	—	November 1, 2007	Socorro	LINEAR	·	1.3 km	MPC · JPL
315367	2007 VV_{1}	—	November 1, 2007	Socorro	LINEAR	·	770 m	MPC · JPL
315368	2007 VX_{2}	—	November 2, 2007	Mount Lemmon	Mount Lemmon Survey	L4	11 km	MPC · JPL
315369	2007 VG_{6}	—	November 3, 2007	Mount Lemmon	Mount Lemmon Survey	L4	10 km	MPC · JPL
315370	2007 VT_{9}	—	November 3, 2007	7300	W. K. Y. Yeung	·	1.6 km	MPC · JPL
315371	2007 VJ_{18}	—	November 1, 2007	Mount Lemmon	Mount Lemmon Survey	MAS	740 m	MPC · JPL
315372	2007 VQ_{26}	—	November 2, 2007	Mount Lemmon	Mount Lemmon Survey	·	750 m	MPC · JPL
315373	2007 VS_{38}	—	November 2, 2007	Catalina	CSS	·	1.3 km	MPC · JPL
315374	2007 VN_{39}	—	November 3, 2007	Kitt Peak	Spacewatch	·	780 m	MPC · JPL
315375	2007 VV_{42}	—	November 3, 2007	Mount Lemmon	Mount Lemmon Survey	(5)	1.4 km	MPC · JPL
315376	2007 VM_{49}	—	November 1, 2007	Kitt Peak	Spacewatch	·	2.1 km	MPC · JPL
315377	2007 VO_{50}	—	November 1, 2007	Kitt Peak	Spacewatch	·	860 m	MPC · JPL
315378	2007 VC_{54}	—	November 1, 2007	Kitt Peak	Spacewatch	·	3.5 km	MPC · JPL
315379	2007 VU_{54}	—	November 1, 2007	Kitt Peak	Spacewatch	NYS	1.2 km	MPC · JPL
315380	2007 VE_{55}	—	November 1, 2007	Kitt Peak	Spacewatch	V	820 m	MPC · JPL
315381	2007 VN_{63}	—	November 1, 2007	Kitt Peak	Spacewatch	·	1.3 km	MPC · JPL
315382	2007 VQ_{64}	—	November 1, 2007	Kitt Peak	Spacewatch	·	1.2 km	MPC · JPL
315383	2007 VX_{66}	—	November 2, 2007	Kitt Peak	Spacewatch	·	1.0 km	MPC · JPL
315384	2007 VP_{72}	—	November 1, 2007	Kitt Peak	Spacewatch	·	880 m	MPC · JPL
315385	2007 VM_{83}	—	November 4, 2007	Mount Lemmon	Mount Lemmon Survey	·	1.6 km	MPC · JPL
315386	2007 VY_{86}	—	November 2, 2007	Socorro	LINEAR	V	700 m	MPC · JPL
315387	2007 VG_{89}	—	November 4, 2007	Socorro	LINEAR	NYS	1.1 km	MPC · JPL
315388	2007 VP_{91}	—	November 7, 2007	Bisei SG Center	BATTeRS	NYS	1.1 km	MPC · JPL
315389	2007 VT_{97}	—	January 17, 2005	Kitt Peak	Spacewatch	·	800 m	MPC · JPL
315390	2007 VH_{105}	—	November 3, 2007	Kitt Peak	Spacewatch	MAS	770 m	MPC · JPL
315391	2007 VX_{107}	—	November 3, 2007	Kitt Peak	Spacewatch	NYS	1.2 km	MPC · JPL
315392	2007 VN_{111}	—	November 3, 2007	Kitt Peak	Spacewatch	·	710 m	MPC · JPL
315393	2007 VH_{114}	—	November 3, 2007	Kitt Peak	Spacewatch	MAS	700 m	MPC · JPL
315394	2007 VY_{118}	—	November 4, 2007	Kitt Peak	Spacewatch	NYS	1.2 km	MPC · JPL
315395	2007 VU_{121}	—	November 5, 2007	Kitt Peak	Spacewatch	(2076)	910 m	MPC · JPL
315396	2007 VJ_{125}	—	November 5, 2007	Purple Mountain	PMO NEO Survey Program	·	1.3 km	MPC · JPL
315397	2007 VS_{135}	—	November 3, 2007	Mount Lemmon	Mount Lemmon Survey	·	1.8 km	MPC · JPL
315398	2007 VR_{138}	—	November 2, 2007	Kitt Peak	Spacewatch	V	690 m	MPC · JPL
315399	2007 VE_{141}	—	November 4, 2007	Mount Lemmon	Mount Lemmon Survey	·	740 m	MPC · JPL
315400	2007 VE_{143}	—	November 4, 2007	Kitt Peak	Spacewatch	·	930 m	MPC · JPL

== 315401–315500 ==
back to top

Designation			Discovery			Properties		Ref
Permanent	Provisional	Named after	Date	Site	Discoverer(s)	Category	Diam.	Ref
315401	2007 VU_{144}	—	November 4, 2007	Kitt Peak	Spacewatch	·	1.2 km	MPC · JPL
315402	2007 VZ_{153}	—	November 4, 2007	Kitt Peak	Spacewatch	·	1.4 km	MPC · JPL
315403	2007 VM_{168}	—	November 5, 2007	Kitt Peak	Spacewatch	NYS	1.2 km	MPC · JPL
315404	2007 VM_{181}	—	November 7, 2007	Mount Lemmon	Mount Lemmon Survey	·	2.6 km	MPC · JPL
315405	2007 VZ_{183}	—	November 12, 2007	Socorro	LINEAR	PHO	3.4 km	MPC · JPL
315406	2007 VF_{185}	—	November 6, 2007	Kitt Peak	Spacewatch	·	1.1 km	MPC · JPL
315407	2007 VE_{192}	—	November 4, 2007	Mount Lemmon	Mount Lemmon Survey	·	1.3 km	MPC · JPL
315408	2007 VJ_{193}	—	November 4, 2007	Mount Lemmon	Mount Lemmon Survey	·	1.8 km	MPC · JPL
315409	2007 VS_{194}	—	November 5, 2007	Mount Lemmon	Mount Lemmon Survey	·	1.4 km	MPC · JPL
315410	2007 VE_{197}	—	November 7, 2007	Mount Lemmon	Mount Lemmon Survey	JUN	1.2 km	MPC · JPL
315411	2007 VJ_{198}	—	November 8, 2007	Mount Lemmon	Mount Lemmon Survey	·	1.4 km	MPC · JPL
315412	2007 VQ_{198}	—	November 8, 2007	Mount Lemmon	Mount Lemmon Survey	·	1.3 km	MPC · JPL
315413	2007 VE_{219}	—	November 9, 2007	Kitt Peak	Spacewatch	·	1.2 km	MPC · JPL
315414	2007 VH_{227}	—	November 12, 2007	Catalina	CSS	·	1.3 km	MPC · JPL
315415	2007 VC_{233}	—	November 7, 2007	Kitt Peak	Spacewatch	·	860 m	MPC · JPL
315416	2007 VK_{233}	—	November 8, 2007	Kitt Peak	Spacewatch	NYS	1.3 km	MPC · JPL
315417	2007 VZ_{237}	—	November 12, 2007	Catalina	CSS	·	1.3 km	MPC · JPL
315418	2007 VE_{241}	—	November 11, 2007	Mount Lemmon	Mount Lemmon Survey	MAR	1.3 km	MPC · JPL
315419	2007 VW_{244}	—	November 14, 2007	Bisei SG Center	BATTeRS	MAS	740 m	MPC · JPL
315420	2007 VU_{245}	—	November 8, 2007	Catalina	CSS	V	740 m	MPC · JPL
315421	2007 VY_{247}	—	November 13, 2007	Mount Lemmon	Mount Lemmon Survey	·	1.0 km	MPC · JPL
315422	2007 VY_{251}	—	November 12, 2007	Mount Lemmon	Mount Lemmon Survey	·	1.3 km	MPC · JPL
315423	2007 VQ_{252}	—	November 12, 2007	Mount Lemmon	Mount Lemmon Survey	·	1.3 km	MPC · JPL
315424	2007 VU_{254}	—	November 15, 2007	Anderson Mesa	LONEOS	·	1.1 km	MPC · JPL
315425	2007 VZ_{255}	—	November 13, 2007	Kitt Peak	Spacewatch	·	1.2 km	MPC · JPL
315426	2007 VZ_{259}	—	November 15, 2007	Mount Lemmon	Mount Lemmon Survey	·	880 m	MPC · JPL
315427	2007 VS_{263}	—	November 13, 2007	Mount Lemmon	Mount Lemmon Survey	·	970 m	MPC · JPL
315428	2007 VJ_{286}	—	November 14, 2007	Kitt Peak	Spacewatch	V	790 m	MPC · JPL
315429	2007 VG_{291}	—	November 14, 2007	Kitt Peak	Spacewatch	MAS	620 m	MPC · JPL
315430	2007 VQ_{292}	—	November 14, 2007	Kitt Peak	Spacewatch	V	930 m	MPC · JPL
315431	2007 VX_{292}	—	November 15, 2007	Catalina	CSS	PHO	1.1 km	MPC · JPL
315432	2007 VX_{294}	—	November 14, 2007	Kitt Peak	Spacewatch	(5)	1.8 km	MPC · JPL
315433	2007 VM_{295}	—	November 13, 2007	Catalina	CSS	V	710 m	MPC · JPL
315434	2007 VD_{299}	—	November 11, 2007	Anderson Mesa	LONEOS	·	990 m	MPC · JPL
315435	2007 VQ_{301}	—	November 11, 2007	Bisei SG Center	BATTeRS	·	1.1 km	MPC · JPL
315436	2007 VA_{311}	—	November 8, 2007	Mount Lemmon	Mount Lemmon Survey	RAF	1.0 km	MPC · JPL
315437	2007 VZ_{312}	—	November 3, 2007	Kitt Peak	Spacewatch	·	1.1 km	MPC · JPL
315438	2007 VP_{326}	—	November 4, 2007	Kitt Peak	Spacewatch	·	1.3 km	MPC · JPL
315439	2007 VN_{335}	—	November 14, 2007	Mount Lemmon	Mount Lemmon Survey	·	2.1 km	MPC · JPL
315440	2007 WX_{1}	—	November 17, 2007	Mayhill	Lowe, A.	·	1.3 km	MPC · JPL
315441	2007 WD_{11}	—	March 25, 2006	Kitt Peak	Spacewatch	·	1.1 km	MPC · JPL
315442	2007 WJ_{15}	—	November 18, 2007	Mount Lemmon	Mount Lemmon Survey	NYS	1.2 km	MPC · JPL
315443	2007 WL_{24}	—	November 18, 2007	Mount Lemmon	Mount Lemmon Survey	·	1.3 km	MPC · JPL
315444	2007 WV_{25}	—	November 18, 2007	Mount Lemmon	Mount Lemmon Survey	·	820 m	MPC · JPL
315445	2007 WM_{41}	—	November 18, 2007	Mount Lemmon	Mount Lemmon Survey	(5)	1.3 km	MPC · JPL
315446	2007 WQ_{54}	—	November 19, 2007	Mount Lemmon	Mount Lemmon Survey	·	1.7 km	MPC · JPL
315447	2007 WS_{59}	—	November 18, 2007	Kitt Peak	Spacewatch	MAS	640 m	MPC · JPL
315448	2007 WZ_{60}	—	November 18, 2007	Kitt Peak	Spacewatch	·	1.4 km	MPC · JPL
315449	2007 XD_{3}	—	December 3, 2007	Catalina	CSS	·	2.6 km	MPC · JPL
315450	2007 XQ_{5}	—	December 4, 2007	Catalina	CSS	·	1.2 km	MPC · JPL
315451	2007 XF_{9}	—	December 4, 2007	Mount Lemmon	Mount Lemmon Survey	slow	1.8 km	MPC · JPL
315452	2007 XJ_{12}	—	December 4, 2007	Kitt Peak	Spacewatch	·	810 m	MPC · JPL
315453	2007 XL_{13}	—	December 4, 2007	Catalina	CSS	·	2.0 km	MPC · JPL
315454	2007 XE_{15}	—	December 5, 2007	Bisei SG Center	BATTeRS	PHO	1.7 km	MPC · JPL
315455	2007 XY_{20}	—	December 12, 2007	La Sagra	OAM	MAS	920 m	MPC · JPL
315456	2007 XB_{22}	—	December 10, 2007	Socorro	LINEAR	·	1.7 km	MPC · JPL
315457	2007 XC_{28}	—	December 14, 2007	Purple Mountain	PMO NEO Survey Program	·	1.2 km	MPC · JPL
315458	2007 XC_{30}	—	December 15, 2007	Catalina	CSS	·	1.8 km	MPC · JPL
315459	2007 XM_{32}	—	December 15, 2007	Catalina	CSS	·	1.6 km	MPC · JPL
315460	2007 XZ_{32}	—	December 15, 2007	Kitt Peak	Spacewatch	·	1.8 km	MPC · JPL
315461	2007 XN_{37}	—	December 13, 2007	Socorro	LINEAR	·	1.4 km	MPC · JPL
315462	2007 XM_{42}	—	December 14, 2007	Mount Lemmon	Mount Lemmon Survey	(5)	1.0 km	MPC · JPL
315463	2007 XP_{51}	—	December 4, 2007	Mount Lemmon	Mount Lemmon Survey	MAS	670 m	MPC · JPL
315464	2007 XA_{53}	—	December 4, 2007	Mount Lemmon	Mount Lemmon Survey	·	1.6 km	MPC · JPL
315465	2007 XV_{53}	—	December 15, 2007	Mount Lemmon	Mount Lemmon Survey	HNS	1.4 km	MPC · JPL
315466	2007 XY_{53}	—	December 14, 2007	Mount Lemmon	Mount Lemmon Survey	·	1.9 km	MPC · JPL
315467	2007 XW_{54}	—	December 4, 2007	Mount Lemmon	Mount Lemmon Survey	MAS	880 m	MPC · JPL
315468	2007 XZ_{56}	—	September 30, 2003	Kitt Peak	Spacewatch	NYS	1.1 km	MPC · JPL
315469	2007 XX_{58}	—	December 14, 2007	Mount Lemmon	Mount Lemmon Survey	·	1.4 km	MPC · JPL
315470	2007 YR_{3}	—	December 17, 2007	Mount Lemmon	Mount Lemmon Survey	·	1.1 km	MPC · JPL
315471	2007 YY_{7}	—	December 16, 2007	Mount Lemmon	Mount Lemmon Survey	V	970 m	MPC · JPL
315472	2007 YC_{10}	—	December 16, 2007	Mount Lemmon	Mount Lemmon Survey	·	1.5 km	MPC · JPL
315473	2007 YQ_{12}	—	December 17, 2007	Mount Lemmon	Mount Lemmon Survey	·	1.7 km	MPC · JPL
315474	2007 YR_{15}	—	December 16, 2007	Kitt Peak	Spacewatch	·	1.2 km	MPC · JPL
315475	2007 YG_{16}	—	December 16, 2007	Kitt Peak	Spacewatch	MAS	730 m	MPC · JPL
315476	2007 YC_{21}	—	December 16, 2007	Kitt Peak	Spacewatch	MAS	660 m	MPC · JPL
315477	2007 YP_{33}	—	March 11, 2005	Kitt Peak	Spacewatch	·	880 m	MPC · JPL
315478	2007 YH_{34}	—	December 28, 2007	Kitt Peak	Spacewatch	·	1.3 km	MPC · JPL
315479	2007 YQ_{38}	—	December 30, 2007	Mount Lemmon	Mount Lemmon Survey	NYS	1.3 km	MPC · JPL
315480	2007 YK_{50}	—	December 28, 2007	Kitt Peak	Spacewatch	·	910 m	MPC · JPL
315481	2007 YP_{58}	—	December 30, 2007	Kitt Peak	Spacewatch	·	1.5 km	MPC · JPL
315482	2007 YL_{63}	—	December 31, 2007	Kitt Peak	Spacewatch	(5)	1.3 km	MPC · JPL
315483	2007 YV_{63}	—	December 31, 2007	Kitt Peak	Spacewatch	·	1.2 km	MPC · JPL
315484	2007 YD_{66}	—	December 30, 2007	Mount Lemmon	Mount Lemmon Survey	·	1.0 km	MPC · JPL
315485	2007 YS_{67}	—	December 17, 2007	Mount Lemmon	Mount Lemmon Survey	·	1.5 km	MPC · JPL
315486	2007 YK_{71}	—	December 16, 2007	Socorro	LINEAR	EUN	1.7 km	MPC · JPL
315487	2007 YS_{71}	—	December 18, 2007	Socorro	LINEAR	·	1.4 km	MPC · JPL
315488	2007 YZ_{71}	—	December 18, 2007	Kitt Peak	Spacewatch	MAR	1.1 km	MPC · JPL
315489	2007 YF_{72}	—	December 18, 2007	Mount Lemmon	Mount Lemmon Survey	·	3.4 km	MPC · JPL
315490	2008 AF	—	January 1, 2008	Bisei SG Center	BATTeRS	ERI	1.5 km	MPC · JPL
315491	2008 AL	—	January 1, 2008	Kitt Peak	Spacewatch	·	1.5 km	MPC · JPL
315492	2008 AV	—	January 4, 2008	Andrushivka	Andrushivka	·	1.8 km	MPC · JPL
315493 Zimin	2008 AE_{2}	Zimin	January 6, 2008	Zelenchukskaya Stn	Korotkiy, S., T. V. Krjačko	V	1.0 km	MPC · JPL
315494	2008 AQ_{2}	—	January 7, 2008	La Sagra	OAM	HNS	1.6 km	MPC · JPL
315495	2008 AQ_{3}	—	January 10, 2008	Badlands	Tozzi, F.	·	1.6 km	MPC · JPL
315496	2008 AW_{3}	—	January 6, 2008	La Sagra	OAM	·	1.3 km	MPC · JPL
315497	2008 AN_{4}	—	January 9, 2008	Lulin	LUSS	BAR	1.6 km	MPC · JPL
315498	2008 AO_{14}	—	January 10, 2008	Kitt Peak	Spacewatch	·	1.1 km	MPC · JPL
315499	2008 AX_{14}	—	January 10, 2008	Kitt Peak	Spacewatch	·	1.1 km	MPC · JPL
315500	2008 AD_{16}	—	October 23, 2006	Catalina	CSS	EUN	1.8 km	MPC · JPL

== 315501–315600 ==
back to top

Designation			Discovery			Properties		Ref
Permanent	Provisional	Named after	Date	Site	Discoverer(s)	Category	Diam.	Ref
315501	2008 AM_{20}	—	January 10, 2008	Mount Lemmon	Mount Lemmon Survey	·	890 m	MPC · JPL
315502	2008 AC_{23}	—	January 10, 2008	Mount Lemmon	Mount Lemmon Survey	(5)	1.3 km	MPC · JPL
315503	2008 AV_{25}	—	January 10, 2008	Mount Lemmon	Mount Lemmon Survey	·	1.2 km	MPC · JPL
315504	2008 AJ_{28}	—	January 10, 2008	Mount Lemmon	Mount Lemmon Survey	·	1.7 km	MPC · JPL
315505	2008 AM_{28}	—	January 10, 2008	Mount Lemmon	Mount Lemmon Survey	EUN	1.5 km	MPC · JPL
315506	2008 AH_{29}	—	January 10, 2008	Goodricke-Pigott	R. A. Tucker	·	2.3 km	MPC · JPL
315507	2008 AE_{30}	—	January 11, 2008	Desert Eagle	W. K. Y. Yeung	·	1.8 km	MPC · JPL
315508	2008 AB_{31}	—	January 12, 2008	Mount Lemmon	Mount Lemmon Survey	AMO	840 m	MPC · JPL
315509	2008 AS_{34}	—	January 10, 2008	Kitt Peak	Spacewatch	·	1.3 km	MPC · JPL
315510	2008 AB_{44}	—	January 10, 2008	Kitt Peak	Spacewatch	·	1.7 km	MPC · JPL
315511	2008 AY_{47}	—	January 11, 2008	Kitt Peak	Spacewatch	·	1.2 km	MPC · JPL
315512	2008 AR_{54}	—	January 11, 2008	Kitt Peak	Spacewatch	·	1.9 km	MPC · JPL
315513	2008 AS_{57}	—	January 11, 2008	Kitt Peak	Spacewatch	(5)	1.2 km	MPC · JPL
315514	2008 AW_{60}	—	January 11, 2008	Kitt Peak	Spacewatch	·	1.8 km	MPC · JPL
315515	2008 AH_{67}	—	January 11, 2008	Kitt Peak	Spacewatch	·	1.3 km	MPC · JPL
315516	2008 AE_{68}	—	January 11, 2008	Kitt Peak	Spacewatch	(5)	1.5 km	MPC · JPL
315517	2008 AW_{68}	—	January 11, 2008	Mount Lemmon	Mount Lemmon Survey	·	1.7 km	MPC · JPL
315518	2008 AC_{69}	—	January 11, 2008	Kitt Peak	Spacewatch	·	1.1 km	MPC · JPL
315519	2008 AA_{71}	—	January 12, 2008	Kitt Peak	Spacewatch	·	1.5 km	MPC · JPL
315520	2008 AH_{71}	—	January 12, 2008	Kitt Peak	Spacewatch	·	1.6 km	MPC · JPL
315521	2008 AX_{72}	—	January 10, 2008	Kitt Peak	Spacewatch	·	2.0 km	MPC · JPL
315522	2008 AN_{81}	—	October 21, 2006	Kitt Peak	Spacewatch	·	1.6 km	MPC · JPL
315523	2008 AZ_{88}	—	January 13, 2008	Kitt Peak	Spacewatch	MAS	810 m	MPC · JPL
315524	2008 AT_{99}	—	January 14, 2008	Kitt Peak	Spacewatch	·	2.8 km	MPC · JPL
315525	2008 AL_{105}	—	January 15, 2008	Mount Lemmon	Mount Lemmon Survey	NYS	1.3 km	MPC · JPL
315526	2008 AB_{108}	—	January 15, 2008	Kitt Peak	Spacewatch	·	1.3 km	MPC · JPL
315527	2008 AO_{114}	—	January 1, 2008	Kitt Peak	Spacewatch	·	2.1 km	MPC · JPL
315528	2008 AA_{118}	—	January 11, 2008	Mount Lemmon	Mount Lemmon Survey	·	1.8 km	MPC · JPL
315529 Claudinefrieden	2008 AN_{120}	Claudinefrieden	January 6, 2008	Mauna Kea	P. A. Wiegert	·	1.0 km	MPC · JPL
315530	2008 AP_{129}	—	January 11, 2008	Palomar	M. E. Schwamb, M. E. Brown	Haumea	218 km	MPC · JPL
315531	2008 AR_{129}	—	January 11, 2008	Mount Lemmon	Mount Lemmon Survey	WIT	1.2 km	MPC · JPL
315532	2008 AB_{135}	—	January 10, 2008	Kitt Peak	Spacewatch	·	2.5 km	MPC · JPL
315533	2008 AV_{137}	—	January 11, 2008	Socorro	LINEAR	MAR	1.8 km	MPC · JPL
315534	2008 BH_{5}	—	January 16, 2008	Kitt Peak	Spacewatch	·	1.6 km	MPC · JPL
315535	2008 BS_{9}	—	January 16, 2008	Kitt Peak	Spacewatch	·	1.5 km	MPC · JPL
315536	2008 BS_{12}	—	December 18, 2007	Mount Lemmon	Mount Lemmon Survey	·	1.4 km	MPC · JPL
315537	2008 BY_{15}	—	January 28, 2008	Lulin	LUSS	·	1.9 km	MPC · JPL
315538	2008 BA_{17}	—	January 27, 2008	Marly	P. Kocher	·	1.1 km	MPC · JPL
315539	2008 BE_{23}	—	January 31, 2008	Mount Lemmon	Mount Lemmon Survey	(5)	1.1 km	MPC · JPL
315540	2008 BT_{34}	—	January 30, 2008	Mount Lemmon	Mount Lemmon Survey	·	1.4 km	MPC · JPL
315541	2008 BU_{38}	—	January 31, 2008	Mount Lemmon	Mount Lemmon Survey	·	1.7 km	MPC · JPL
315542	2008 BW_{38}	—	January 31, 2008	Mount Lemmon	Mount Lemmon Survey	·	2.0 km	MPC · JPL
315543	2008 BR_{40}	—	January 31, 2008	Catalina	CSS	·	1.6 km	MPC · JPL
315544	2008 BS_{43}	—	January 30, 2008	Catalina	CSS	·	1.2 km	MPC · JPL
315545	2008 BJ_{46}	—	January 30, 2008	Kitt Peak	Spacewatch	MAR	2.0 km	MPC · JPL
315546	2008 BQ_{47}	—	January 31, 2008	Mount Lemmon	Mount Lemmon Survey	EUN	1.7 km	MPC · JPL
315547	2008 BV_{48}	—	January 30, 2008	Catalina	CSS	·	1.9 km	MPC · JPL
315548	2008 BK_{49}	—	January 19, 2008	Mount Lemmon	Mount Lemmon Survey	·	1.6 km	MPC · JPL
315549	2008 BB_{52}	—	January 18, 2008	Kitt Peak	Spacewatch	(5)	1.1 km	MPC · JPL
315550	2008 BR_{52}	—	February 11, 2004	Kitt Peak	Spacewatch	·	1.3 km	MPC · JPL
315551	2008 CL_{4}	—	January 10, 2008	Kitt Peak	Spacewatch	·	1.4 km	MPC · JPL
315552	2008 CM_{5}	—	February 5, 2008	La Sagra	OAM	·	1.8 km	MPC · JPL
315553	2008 CM_{9}	—	September 25, 2006	Kitt Peak	Spacewatch	·	980 m	MPC · JPL
315554	2008 CE_{14}	—	February 3, 2008	Kitt Peak	Spacewatch	·	1.9 km	MPC · JPL
315555	2008 CZ_{15}	—	February 3, 2008	Kitt Peak	Spacewatch	·	1.6 km	MPC · JPL
315556	2008 CB_{20}	—	February 6, 2008	Catalina	CSS	·	1.8 km	MPC · JPL
315557	2008 CT_{22}	—	February 7, 2008	La Sagra	OAM	·	1.5 km	MPC · JPL
315558	2008 CA_{24}	—	February 1, 2008	Kitt Peak	Spacewatch	·	870 m	MPC · JPL
315559	2008 CR_{27}	—	February 2, 2008	Kitt Peak	Spacewatch	·	1.5 km	MPC · JPL
315560	2008 CU_{28}	—	February 2, 2008	Kitt Peak	Spacewatch	·	1.2 km	MPC · JPL
315561	2008 CZ_{32}	—	February 2, 2008	Kitt Peak	Spacewatch	·	1.0 km	MPC · JPL
315562	2008 CV_{36}	—	February 2, 2008	Kitt Peak	Spacewatch	·	1.3 km	MPC · JPL
315563	2008 CW_{38}	—	February 2, 2008	Mount Lemmon	Mount Lemmon Survey	·	1.1 km	MPC · JPL
315564	2008 CY_{38}	—	February 2, 2008	Mount Lemmon	Mount Lemmon Survey	·	1.6 km	MPC · JPL
315565	2008 CS_{40}	—	February 2, 2008	Kitt Peak	Spacewatch	(5)	1.1 km	MPC · JPL
315566	2008 CS_{43}	—	February 2, 2008	Kitt Peak	Spacewatch	·	1.6 km	MPC · JPL
315567	2008 CP_{46}	—	February 2, 2008	Kitt Peak	Spacewatch	·	2.6 km	MPC · JPL
315568	2008 CA_{47}	—	February 2, 2008	Kitt Peak	Spacewatch	·	2.3 km	MPC · JPL
315569	2008 CE_{48}	—	February 3, 2008	Catalina	CSS	·	1.9 km	MPC · JPL
315570	2008 CY_{50}	—	February 6, 2008	Catalina	CSS	·	2.8 km	MPC · JPL
315571	2008 CX_{53}	—	February 7, 2008	Catalina	CSS	·	1.9 km	MPC · JPL
315572	2008 CV_{55}	—	February 7, 2008	Kitt Peak	Spacewatch	·	1.4 km	MPC · JPL
315573	2008 CT_{58}	—	February 7, 2008	Mount Lemmon	Mount Lemmon Survey	·	1.4 km	MPC · JPL
315574	2008 CX_{58}	—	February 7, 2008	Mount Lemmon	Mount Lemmon Survey	·	1.3 km	MPC · JPL
315575	2008 CP_{59}	—	February 7, 2008	Mount Lemmon	Mount Lemmon Survey	·	2.1 km	MPC · JPL
315576	2008 CY_{66}	—	February 8, 2008	Catalina	CSS	·	3.1 km	MPC · JPL
315577 Carmenchu	2008 CB_{70}	Carmenchu	February 9, 2008	La Cañada	Lacruz, J.	·	1.3 km	MPC · JPL
315578	2008 CT_{73}	—	February 6, 2008	Catalina	CSS	·	1.6 km	MPC · JPL
315579 Vandersyppe	2008 CH_{74}	Vandersyppe	February 10, 2008	Uccle	P. De Cat	·	1.2 km	MPC · JPL
315580	2008 CL_{75}	—	February 9, 2008	Mount Lemmon	Mount Lemmon Survey	·	1.3 km	MPC · JPL
315581	2008 CP_{76}	—	February 6, 2008	Catalina	CSS	·	1.4 km	MPC · JPL
315582	2008 CV_{76}	—	February 6, 2008	Catalina	CSS	·	1.9 km	MPC · JPL
315583	2008 CF_{86}	—	February 7, 2008	Mount Lemmon	Mount Lemmon Survey	·	1.3 km	MPC · JPL
315584	2008 CM_{86}	—	February 7, 2008	Mount Lemmon	Mount Lemmon Survey	·	2.3 km	MPC · JPL
315585	2008 CJ_{88}	—	February 7, 2008	Mount Lemmon	Mount Lemmon Survey	(5)	1.7 km	MPC · JPL
315586	2008 CQ_{88}	—	February 7, 2008	Mount Lemmon	Mount Lemmon Survey	·	2.1 km	MPC · JPL
315587	2008 CM_{90}	—	February 8, 2008	Catalina	CSS	·	1.7 km	MPC · JPL
315588	2008 CJ_{103}	—	February 9, 2008	Kitt Peak	Spacewatch	·	1.0 km	MPC · JPL
315589	2008 CC_{117}	—	February 12, 2008	Mayhill	Lowe, A.	·	1.7 km	MPC · JPL
315590	2008 CZ_{117}	—	February 12, 2008	Wildberg	R. Apitzsch	·	1.3 km	MPC · JPL
315591	2008 CM_{119}	—	February 13, 2008	Schiaparelli	Schiaparelli	·	2.6 km	MPC · JPL
315592	2008 CU_{124}	—	February 7, 2008	Kitt Peak	Spacewatch	·	1.9 km	MPC · JPL
315593	2008 CY_{126}	—	February 8, 2008	Kitt Peak	Spacewatch	·	1.8 km	MPC · JPL
315594	2008 CL_{130}	—	February 8, 2008	Kitt Peak	Spacewatch	·	4.7 km	MPC · JPL
315595	2008 CK_{131}	—	February 8, 2008	Kitt Peak	Spacewatch	·	1.3 km	MPC · JPL
315596	2008 CG_{132}	—	February 8, 2008	Kitt Peak	Spacewatch	·	1.7 km	MPC · JPL
315597	2008 CO_{140}	—	February 8, 2008	Kitt Peak	Spacewatch	·	1.5 km	MPC · JPL
315598	2008 CG_{150}	—	February 9, 2008	Kitt Peak	Spacewatch	·	1.6 km	MPC · JPL
315599	2008 CF_{152}	—	March 31, 2004	Kitt Peak	Spacewatch	·	1.3 km	MPC · JPL
315600	2008 CG_{154}	—	February 9, 2008	Kitt Peak	Spacewatch	·	1.7 km	MPC · JPL

== 315601–315700 ==
back to top

Designation			Discovery			Properties		Ref
Permanent	Provisional	Named after	Date	Site	Discoverer(s)	Category	Diam.	Ref
315601	2008 CS_{157}	—	February 9, 2008	Catalina	CSS	·	1.8 km	MPC · JPL
315602	2008 CN_{160}	—	February 9, 2008	Kitt Peak	Spacewatch	·	2.2 km	MPC · JPL
315603	2008 CJ_{163}	—	February 10, 2008	Catalina	CSS	HNS	1.4 km	MPC · JPL
315604	2008 CK_{168}	—	February 11, 2008	Kitt Peak	Spacewatch	·	4.2 km	MPC · JPL
315605	2008 CX_{175}	—	February 6, 2008	Socorro	LINEAR	·	3.7 km	MPC · JPL
315606	2008 CU_{178}	—	January 18, 2008	Mount Lemmon	Mount Lemmon Survey	HNS	1.2 km	MPC · JPL
315607	2008 CL_{179}	—	February 6, 2008	Catalina	CSS	·	3.1 km	MPC · JPL
315608	2008 CY_{179}	—	February 8, 2008	Catalina	CSS	·	1.8 km	MPC · JPL
315609	2008 CN_{180}	—	February 9, 2008	Catalina	CSS	·	1.5 km	MPC · JPL
315610	2008 CP_{180}	—	February 9, 2008	Catalina	CSS	·	1.8 km	MPC · JPL
315611	2008 CS_{180}	—	February 9, 2008	Catalina	CSS	PHO	1.3 km	MPC · JPL
315612	2008 CX_{181}	—	February 11, 2008	Mount Lemmon	Mount Lemmon Survey	EUN	1.8 km	MPC · JPL
315613	2008 CN_{182}	—	February 11, 2008	Mount Lemmon	Mount Lemmon Survey	·	2.1 km	MPC · JPL
315614	2008 CZ_{182}	—	February 11, 2008	Mount Lemmon	Mount Lemmon Survey	GEF	1.6 km	MPC · JPL
315615	2008 CZ_{184}	—	February 2, 2008	Kitt Peak	Spacewatch	·	860 m	MPC · JPL
315616	2008 CP_{192}	—	February 3, 2008	Kitt Peak	Spacewatch	·	1.9 km	MPC · JPL
315617	2008 CW_{194}	—	February 13, 2008	Mount Lemmon	Mount Lemmon Survey	EOS	2.4 km	MPC · JPL
315618	2008 CD_{199}	—	February 13, 2008	Kitt Peak	Spacewatch	·	1.5 km	MPC · JPL
315619	2008 CE_{199}	—	February 13, 2008	Kitt Peak	Spacewatch	·	1.4 km	MPC · JPL
315620	2008 CM_{199}	—	February 13, 2008	Mount Lemmon	Mount Lemmon Survey	·	1.5 km	MPC · JPL
315621	2008 CQ_{199}	—	February 13, 2008	Mount Lemmon	Mount Lemmon Survey	·	2.4 km	MPC · JPL
315622	2008 CW_{199}	—	February 13, 2008	Mount Lemmon	Mount Lemmon Survey	WIT	1.2 km	MPC · JPL
315623	2008 CZ_{200}	—	February 11, 2008	Mount Lemmon	Mount Lemmon Survey	·	2.0 km	MPC · JPL
315624	2008 CF_{204}	—	February 10, 2008	Kitt Peak	Spacewatch	·	2.3 km	MPC · JPL
315625	2008 CS_{205}	—	February 2, 2008	Kitt Peak	Spacewatch	·	2.0 km	MPC · JPL
315626	2008 CY_{205}	—	February 3, 2008	Kitt Peak	Spacewatch	(5)	1.1 km	MPC · JPL
315627	2008 CV_{209}	—	February 7, 2008	Mount Lemmon	Mount Lemmon Survey	·	1.2 km	MPC · JPL
315628	2008 CD_{210}	—	August 29, 2006	Kitt Peak	Spacewatch	·	1.2 km	MPC · JPL
315629	2008 CE_{213}	—	February 9, 2008	Socorro	LINEAR	·	1.8 km	MPC · JPL
315630	2008 CU_{215}	—	February 13, 2008	Mount Lemmon	Mount Lemmon Survey	·	2.9 km	MPC · JPL
315631	2008 DV_{5}	—	February 24, 2008	Kitt Peak	Spacewatch	·	1.1 km	MPC · JPL
315632	2008 DC_{14}	—	February 26, 2008	Mount Lemmon	Mount Lemmon Survey	·	2.3 km	MPC · JPL
315633	2008 DC_{15}	—	February 26, 2008	Mount Lemmon	Mount Lemmon Survey	·	1.5 km	MPC · JPL
315634	2008 DL_{18}	—	February 26, 2008	Mount Lemmon	Mount Lemmon Survey	·	1.1 km	MPC · JPL
315635	2008 DN_{20}	—	February 28, 2008	Mount Lemmon	Mount Lemmon Survey	·	890 m	MPC · JPL
315636	2008 DF_{26}	—	February 29, 2008	Purple Mountain	PMO NEO Survey Program	·	2.5 km	MPC · JPL
315637	2008 DN_{26}	—	February 26, 2008	Mount Lemmon	Mount Lemmon Survey	·	1.6 km	MPC · JPL
315638	2008 DG_{28}	—	February 24, 2008	Kitt Peak	Spacewatch	·	1.2 km	MPC · JPL
315639	2008 DK_{30}	—	February 26, 2008	Mount Lemmon	Mount Lemmon Survey	·	1.3 km	MPC · JPL
315640	2008 DD_{32}	—	February 27, 2008	Kitt Peak	Spacewatch	·	1.9 km	MPC · JPL
315641	2008 DG_{32}	—	February 27, 2008	Kitt Peak	Spacewatch	·	1.4 km	MPC · JPL
315642	2008 DS_{33}	—	February 27, 2008	Catalina	CSS	·	3.5 km	MPC · JPL
315643	2008 DV_{33}	—	February 27, 2008	Kitt Peak	Spacewatch	·	1.8 km	MPC · JPL
315644	2008 DL_{34}	—	February 27, 2008	Kitt Peak	Spacewatch	·	3.2 km	MPC · JPL
315645	2008 DS_{34}	—	February 27, 2008	Mount Lemmon	Mount Lemmon Survey	·	2.2 km	MPC · JPL
315646	2008 DP_{37}	—	February 10, 2008	Mount Lemmon	Mount Lemmon Survey	WIT	1.1 km	MPC · JPL
315647	2008 DX_{37}	—	February 27, 2008	Mount Lemmon	Mount Lemmon Survey	·	2.3 km	MPC · JPL
315648	2008 DR_{38}	—	February 27, 2008	Kitt Peak	Spacewatch	EUN	1.5 km	MPC · JPL
315649	2008 DF_{44}	—	February 28, 2008	Kitt Peak	Spacewatch	·	1.7 km	MPC · JPL
315650	2008 DA_{46}	—	July 30, 2005	Palomar	NEAT	MRX	1.2 km	MPC · JPL
315651	2008 DH_{46}	—	February 28, 2008	Mount Lemmon	Mount Lemmon Survey	·	1.1 km	MPC · JPL
315652	2008 DZ_{46}	—	February 28, 2008	Kitt Peak	Spacewatch	(5)	1.2 km	MPC · JPL
315653	2008 DO_{47}	—	February 28, 2008	Mount Lemmon	Mount Lemmon Survey	NEM	2.8 km	MPC · JPL
315654	2008 DX_{47}	—	February 13, 2008	Mount Lemmon	Mount Lemmon Survey	·	1.8 km	MPC · JPL
315655	2008 DR_{48}	—	April 25, 2004	Apache Point	SDSS	HNS	1.2 km	MPC · JPL
315656	2008 DO_{53}	—	February 29, 2008	Mount Lemmon	Mount Lemmon Survey	·	1.6 km	MPC · JPL
315657	2008 DR_{55}	—	February 27, 2008	Kitt Peak	Spacewatch	·	2.1 km	MPC · JPL
315658	2008 DU_{56}	—	February 29, 2008	Catalina	CSS	EUN	1.7 km	MPC · JPL
315659	2008 DX_{57}	—	February 28, 2008	Catalina	CSS	·	2.1 km	MPC · JPL
315660	2008 DE_{58}	—	February 29, 2008	Catalina	CSS	·	2.7 km	MPC · JPL
315661	2008 DH_{60}	—	February 28, 2008	Kitt Peak	Spacewatch	·	1.9 km	MPC · JPL
315662	2008 DO_{60}	—	February 28, 2008	Mount Lemmon	Mount Lemmon Survey	·	2.0 km	MPC · JPL
315663	2008 DW_{60}	—	February 28, 2008	Mount Lemmon	Mount Lemmon Survey	MIS	2.8 km	MPC · JPL
315664	2008 DD_{61}	—	February 28, 2008	Mount Lemmon	Mount Lemmon Survey	·	1.3 km	MPC · JPL
315665	2008 DN_{61}	—	February 28, 2008	Mount Lemmon	Mount Lemmon Survey	·	1.7 km	MPC · JPL
315666	2008 DT_{72}	—	February 3, 2008	Kitt Peak	Spacewatch	·	1.9 km	MPC · JPL
315667	2008 DR_{73}	—	February 27, 2008	Mount Lemmon	Mount Lemmon Survey	EOS	1.9 km	MPC · JPL
315668	2008 DA_{77}	—	February 28, 2008	Kitt Peak	Spacewatch	KOR	1.8 km	MPC · JPL
315669	2008 DH_{79}	—	February 27, 2008	Catalina	CSS	·	1.4 km	MPC · JPL
315670	2008 DS_{79}	—	February 29, 2008	Catalina	CSS	·	2.0 km	MPC · JPL
315671	2008 DF_{83}	—	February 28, 2008	Kitt Peak	Spacewatch	·	1.8 km	MPC · JPL
315672	2008 DJ_{88}	—	October 21, 2000	Kitt Peak	Spacewatch	EOS	2.5 km	MPC · JPL
315673	2008 EO_{4}	—	March 2, 2008	Mount Lemmon	Mount Lemmon Survey	·	1.5 km	MPC · JPL
315674	2008 EA_{5}	—	March 3, 2008	Grove Creek	Tozzi, F.	·	2.3 km	MPC · JPL
315675	2008 EJ_{7}	—	March 5, 2008	Vail-Jarnac	Jarnac	·	2.2 km	MPC · JPL
315676	2008 ER_{8}	—	March 6, 2008	La Sagra	OAM	HNS	1.7 km	MPC · JPL
315677	2008 EV_{10}	—	March 1, 2008	Kitt Peak	Spacewatch	PAD	2.2 km	MPC · JPL
315678	2008 EA_{11}	—	March 1, 2008	Kitt Peak	Spacewatch	(5)	1.4 km	MPC · JPL
315679	2008 EL_{11}	—	March 1, 2008	Kitt Peak	Spacewatch	·	1.7 km	MPC · JPL
315680	2008 EW_{15}	—	March 1, 2008	Kitt Peak	Spacewatch	EUN	1.5 km	MPC · JPL
315681	2008 EC_{19}	—	March 2, 2008	Catalina	CSS	·	1.8 km	MPC · JPL
315682	2008 EL_{23}	—	March 3, 2008	Catalina	CSS	·	2.9 km	MPC · JPL
315683	2008 EQ_{26}	—	March 4, 2008	Catalina	CSS	EUN	2.0 km	MPC · JPL
315684	2008 EP_{28}	—	March 4, 2008	Mount Lemmon	Mount Lemmon Survey	·	2.8 km	MPC · JPL
315685	2008 EJ_{29}	—	March 4, 2008	Mount Lemmon	Mount Lemmon Survey	DOR	2.8 km	MPC · JPL
315686	2008 EP_{33}	—	March 1, 2008	Catalina	CSS	·	2.7 km	MPC · JPL
315687	2008 EE_{34}	—	March 2, 2008	Catalina	CSS	EUN	1.5 km	MPC · JPL
315688	2008 EK_{36}	—	March 3, 2008	Kitt Peak	Spacewatch	·	2.6 km	MPC · JPL
315689	2008 EF_{37}	—	March 4, 2008	Kitt Peak	Spacewatch	·	1.6 km	MPC · JPL
315690	2008 EM_{41}	—	March 4, 2008	Mount Lemmon	Mount Lemmon Survey	·	2.7 km	MPC · JPL
315691	2008 EV_{42}	—	March 4, 2008	Mount Lemmon	Mount Lemmon Survey	·	2.4 km	MPC · JPL
315692	2008 EG_{47}	—	March 5, 2008	Mount Lemmon	Mount Lemmon Survey	·	2.4 km	MPC · JPL
315693	2008 EU_{51}	—	March 6, 2008	Mount Lemmon	Mount Lemmon Survey	·	2.4 km	MPC · JPL
315694	2008 ED_{55}	—	March 6, 2008	Kitt Peak	Spacewatch	·	1.8 km	MPC · JPL
315695	2008 EH_{55}	—	March 6, 2008	Mount Lemmon	Mount Lemmon Survey	·	2.2 km	MPC · JPL
315696	2008 EW_{56}	—	March 7, 2008	Catalina	CSS	·	2.0 km	MPC · JPL
315697	2008 EW_{60}	—	March 8, 2008	Mount Lemmon	Mount Lemmon Survey	·	2.2 km	MPC · JPL
315698	2008 EJ_{73}	—	March 7, 2008	Catalina	CSS	·	1.8 km	MPC · JPL
315699	2008 EF_{74}	—	March 7, 2008	Kitt Peak	Spacewatch	AGN	1.6 km	MPC · JPL
315700	2008 EX_{81}	—	March 4, 2008	Socorro	LINEAR	·	1.3 km	MPC · JPL

== 315701–315800 ==
back to top

Designation			Discovery			Properties		Ref
Permanent	Provisional	Named after	Date	Site	Discoverer(s)	Category	Diam.	Ref
315701	2008 EE_{83}	—	March 8, 2008	Socorro	LINEAR	·	2.7 km	MPC · JPL
315702	2008 EX_{83}	—	March 8, 2008	Catalina	CSS	·	1.7 km	MPC · JPL
315703	2008 ET_{85}	—	March 7, 2008	Mount Lemmon	Mount Lemmon Survey	(12739)	1.5 km	MPC · JPL
315704	2008 EY_{85}	—	March 7, 2008	Catalina	CSS	·	1.5 km	MPC · JPL
315705	2008 EB_{90}	—	March 11, 2008	Socorro	LINEAR	·	3.0 km	MPC · JPL
315706	2008 EP_{90}	—	March 11, 2008	Kitt Peak	Spacewatch	·	2.9 km	MPC · JPL
315707	2008 EC_{95}	—	March 5, 2008	Mount Lemmon	Mount Lemmon Survey	AEO	1.3 km	MPC · JPL
315708	2008 ED_{95}	—	March 5, 2008	Mount Lemmon	Mount Lemmon Survey	·	2.6 km	MPC · JPL
315709	2008 EP_{98}	—	March 3, 2008	Catalina	CSS	·	2.7 km	MPC · JPL
315710	2008 EL_{99}	—	March 4, 2008	Catalina	CSS	(5)	1.6 km	MPC · JPL
315711	2008 EB_{105}	—	March 6, 2008	Mount Lemmon	Mount Lemmon Survey	·	1.8 km	MPC · JPL
315712	2008 EF_{109}	—	March 7, 2008	Catalina	CSS	·	3.4 km	MPC · JPL
315713	2008 EH_{111}	—	March 8, 2008	Kitt Peak	Spacewatch	·	2.3 km	MPC · JPL
315714	2008 EN_{111}	—	March 8, 2008	Kitt Peak	Spacewatch	·	2.3 km	MPC · JPL
315715	2008 EC_{112}	—	March 8, 2008	Kitt Peak	Spacewatch	·	1.5 km	MPC · JPL
315716	2008 EL_{113}	—	March 8, 2008	Catalina	CSS	·	2.4 km	MPC · JPL
315717	2008 ER_{115}	—	March 8, 2008	Mount Lemmon	Mount Lemmon Survey	KOR	1.4 km	MPC · JPL
315718	2008 EJ_{117}	—	March 8, 2008	Kitt Peak	Spacewatch	LEO	1.9 km	MPC · JPL
315719	2008 ET_{119}	—	March 9, 2008	Kitt Peak	Spacewatch	MRX	1.1 km	MPC · JPL
315720	2008 EF_{120}	—	March 9, 2008	Kitt Peak	Spacewatch	·	3.2 km	MPC · JPL
315721	2008 EC_{122}	—	March 9, 2008	Kitt Peak	Spacewatch	AGN	1.0 km	MPC · JPL
315722	2008 EY_{125}	—	March 10, 2008	Kitt Peak	Spacewatch	·	1.9 km	MPC · JPL
315723	2008 EB_{131}	—	March 11, 2008	Kitt Peak	Spacewatch	AEO	1.2 km	MPC · JPL
315724	2008 EX_{131}	—	March 11, 2008	Kitt Peak	Spacewatch	·	1.8 km	MPC · JPL
315725	2008 EB_{135}	—	March 11, 2008	Kitt Peak	Spacewatch	·	1.8 km	MPC · JPL
315726	2008 EF_{135}	—	March 11, 2008	Kitt Peak	Spacewatch	·	1.3 km	MPC · JPL
315727	2008 EV_{136}	—	March 11, 2008	Kitt Peak	Spacewatch	·	1.1 km	MPC · JPL
315728	2008 EN_{139}	—	March 11, 2008	Catalina	CSS	·	1.7 km	MPC · JPL
315729	2008 ES_{141}	—	March 12, 2008	Mount Lemmon	Mount Lemmon Survey	BRG	1.4 km	MPC · JPL
315730	2008 EK_{143}	—	March 13, 2008	Catalina	CSS	·	1.9 km	MPC · JPL
315731	2008 EM_{148}	—	March 2, 2008	Kitt Peak	Spacewatch	·	2.1 km	MPC · JPL
315732	2008 EH_{150}	—	March 9, 2008	Kitt Peak	Spacewatch	·	1.8 km	MPC · JPL
315733	2008 EY_{150}	—	March 4, 2008	Mount Lemmon	Mount Lemmon Survey	EUN	1.5 km	MPC · JPL
315734	2008 EZ_{152}	—	March 11, 2008	Mount Lemmon	Mount Lemmon Survey	HOF	2.6 km	MPC · JPL
315735	2008 EN_{156}	—	March 1, 2008	Kitt Peak	Spacewatch	·	1.7 km	MPC · JPL
315736	2008 EG_{160}	—	March 1, 2008	Kitt Peak	Spacewatch	·	2.3 km	MPC · JPL
315737	2008 EL_{165}	—	March 2, 2008	Mount Lemmon	Mount Lemmon Survey	HNS	1.6 km	MPC · JPL
315738	2008 EG_{167}	—	March 8, 2008	Kitt Peak	Spacewatch	AGN	1.5 km	MPC · JPL
315739	2008 EK_{168}	—	October 8, 2005	Catalina	CSS	·	3.5 km	MPC · JPL
315740	2008 FK_{2}	—	March 25, 2008	Kitt Peak	Spacewatch	EUN	1.9 km	MPC · JPL
315741	2008 FN_{2}	—	October 13, 2001	Kitt Peak	Spacewatch	·	2.2 km	MPC · JPL
315742	2008 FC_{4}	—	March 25, 2008	Kitt Peak	Spacewatch	·	1.9 km	MPC · JPL
315743	2008 FV_{4}	—	March 26, 2008	Mount Lemmon	Mount Lemmon Survey	·	1.7 km	MPC · JPL
315744	2008 FQ_{7}	—	March 30, 2008	Piszkéstető	K. Sárneczky	NEM	2.5 km	MPC · JPL
315745	2008 FS_{10}	—	March 26, 2008	Kitt Peak	Spacewatch	HOF	2.6 km	MPC · JPL
315746	2008 FZ_{10}	—	March 26, 2008	Kitt Peak	Spacewatch	·	2.1 km	MPC · JPL
315747	2008 FK_{14}	—	March 26, 2008	Mount Lemmon	Mount Lemmon Survey	·	1.6 km	MPC · JPL
315748	2008 FM_{14}	—	March 26, 2008	Mount Lemmon	Mount Lemmon Survey	·	2.3 km	MPC · JPL
315749	2008 FD_{15}	—	March 26, 2008	Kitt Peak	Spacewatch	EOS	3.6 km	MPC · JPL
315750	2008 FR_{24}	—	March 27, 2008	Kitt Peak	Spacewatch	·	3.5 km	MPC · JPL
315751	2008 FP_{26}	—	March 27, 2008	Kitt Peak	Spacewatch	·	2.6 km	MPC · JPL
315752	2008 FE_{27}	—	March 27, 2008	Kitt Peak	Spacewatch	·	2.4 km	MPC · JPL
315753	2008 FB_{35}	—	March 28, 2008	Mount Lemmon	Mount Lemmon Survey	·	1.6 km	MPC · JPL
315754	2008 FG_{38}	—	March 28, 2008	Kitt Peak	Spacewatch	AGN	1.3 km	MPC · JPL
315755	2008 FO_{38}	—	March 28, 2008	Kitt Peak	Spacewatch	·	1.5 km	MPC · JPL
315756	2008 FH_{42}	—	February 27, 2008	Mount Lemmon	Mount Lemmon Survey	·	1.9 km	MPC · JPL
315757	2008 FH_{50}	—	March 28, 2008	Kitt Peak	Spacewatch	HOF	3.0 km	MPC · JPL
315758	2008 FL_{52}	—	March 28, 2008	Mount Lemmon	Mount Lemmon Survey	·	1.4 km	MPC · JPL
315759	2008 FK_{55}	—	March 28, 2008	Mount Lemmon	Mount Lemmon Survey	EOS	2.1 km	MPC · JPL
315760	2008 FD_{57}	—	March 28, 2008	Mount Lemmon	Mount Lemmon Survey	·	2.2 km	MPC · JPL
315761	2008 FY_{59}	—	March 29, 2008	Mount Lemmon	Mount Lemmon Survey	ADE	2.9 km	MPC · JPL
315762	2008 FS_{63}	—	March 27, 2008	Kitt Peak	Spacewatch	·	3.3 km	MPC · JPL
315763	2008 FK_{64}	—	March 28, 2008	Mount Lemmon	Mount Lemmon Survey	·	1.9 km	MPC · JPL
315764	2008 FP_{65}	—	March 28, 2008	Mount Lemmon	Mount Lemmon Survey	MIS	2.3 km	MPC · JPL
315765	2008 FW_{68}	—	March 28, 2008	Mount Lemmon	Mount Lemmon Survey	·	3.1 km	MPC · JPL
315766	2008 FU_{69}	—	March 28, 2008	Kitt Peak	Spacewatch	EOS	2.5 km	MPC · JPL
315767	2008 FY_{69}	—	September 10, 2004	Kitt Peak	Spacewatch	·	2.1 km	MPC · JPL
315768	2008 FM_{75}	—	March 31, 2008	Mount Lemmon	Mount Lemmon Survey	·	1.2 km	MPC · JPL
315769	2008 FA_{76}	—	March 31, 2008	Mayhill	Lowe, A.	·	2.2 km	MPC · JPL
315770	2008 FG_{76}	—	March 30, 2008	Catalina	CSS	·	2.8 km	MPC · JPL
315771	2008 FV_{80}	—	March 27, 2008	Mount Lemmon	Mount Lemmon Survey	·	1.0 km	MPC · JPL
315772	2008 FK_{87}	—	March 28, 2008	Mount Lemmon	Mount Lemmon Survey	·	2.0 km	MPC · JPL
315773	2008 FR_{94}	—	March 29, 2008	Kitt Peak	Spacewatch	AEO	1.6 km	MPC · JPL
315774	2008 FU_{96}	—	March 29, 2008	Catalina	CSS	·	2.0 km	MPC · JPL
315775	2008 FP_{102}	—	March 30, 2008	Kitt Peak	Spacewatch	·	3.5 km	MPC · JPL
315776	2008 FT_{103}	—	March 30, 2008	Kitt Peak	Spacewatch	(159)	3.1 km	MPC · JPL
315777	2008 FO_{104}	—	February 10, 2008	Mount Lemmon	Mount Lemmon Survey	·	1.5 km	MPC · JPL
315778	2008 FU_{104}	—	March 30, 2008	Kitt Peak	Spacewatch	·	2.1 km	MPC · JPL
315779	2008 FO_{105}	—	March 31, 2008	Kitt Peak	Spacewatch	·	2.0 km	MPC · JPL
315780	2008 FG_{109}	—	March 31, 2008	Mount Lemmon	Mount Lemmon Survey	·	2.1 km	MPC · JPL
315781	2008 FR_{109}	—	March 31, 2008	Mount Lemmon	Mount Lemmon Survey	·	2.3 km	MPC · JPL
315782	2008 FO_{114}	—	March 31, 2008	Mount Lemmon	Mount Lemmon Survey	AGN	1.1 km	MPC · JPL
315783	2008 FV_{115}	—	March 31, 2008	Mount Lemmon	Mount Lemmon Survey	KOR	1.5 km	MPC · JPL
315784	2008 FY_{115}	—	March 31, 2008	Mount Lemmon	Mount Lemmon Survey	KOR	1.3 km	MPC · JPL
315785	2008 FJ_{116}	—	March 31, 2008	Mount Lemmon	Mount Lemmon Survey	MIS	2.2 km	MPC · JPL
315786	2008 FM_{123}	—	March 28, 2008	Kitt Peak	Spacewatch	VER	4.1 km	MPC · JPL
315787	2008 FN_{125}	—	March 31, 2008	Kitt Peak	Spacewatch	·	1.9 km	MPC · JPL
315788	2008 FO_{129}	—	March 31, 2008	Kitt Peak	Spacewatch	·	3.2 km	MPC · JPL
315789	2008 FC_{130}	—	March 29, 2008	Catalina	CSS	EOS	2.3 km	MPC · JPL
315790	2008 FF_{131}	—	March 31, 2008	Mount Lemmon	Mount Lemmon Survey	·	2.2 km	MPC · JPL
315791	2008 FM_{131}	—	March 29, 2008	Mount Lemmon	Mount Lemmon Survey	·	1.0 km	MPC · JPL
315792	2008 FV_{133}	—	March 28, 2008	Mount Lemmon	Mount Lemmon Survey	KOR	1.7 km	MPC · JPL
315793	2008 GK_{1}	—	April 3, 2008	La Sagra	OAM	·	1.9 km	MPC · JPL
315794	2008 GA_{2}	—	April 5, 2008	Socorro	LINEAR	·	2.5 km	MPC · JPL
315795	2008 GW_{3}	—	August 29, 2005	Kitt Peak	Spacewatch	WIT	1.1 km	MPC · JPL
315796	2008 GA_{7}	—	April 1, 2008	Kitt Peak	Spacewatch	·	3.4 km	MPC · JPL
315797	2008 GN_{7}	—	April 1, 2008	Kitt Peak	Spacewatch	·	2.2 km	MPC · JPL
315798	2008 GU_{7}	—	April 1, 2008	Kitt Peak	Spacewatch	·	2.0 km	MPC · JPL
315799	2008 GE_{8}	—	April 1, 2008	Kitt Peak	Spacewatch	·	1.0 km	MPC · JPL
315800	2008 GS_{15}	—	March 13, 2008	Kitt Peak	Spacewatch	AGN	1.2 km	MPC · JPL

== 315801–315900 ==
back to top

Designation			Discovery			Properties		Ref
Permanent	Provisional	Named after	Date	Site	Discoverer(s)	Category	Diam.	Ref
315801	2008 GT_{16}	—	April 3, 2008	Kitt Peak	Spacewatch	DOR	3.1 km	MPC · JPL
315802	2008 GH_{23}	—	April 1, 2008	Mount Lemmon	Mount Lemmon Survey	HOF	3.5 km	MPC · JPL
315803	2008 GS_{23}	—	April 1, 2008	Mount Lemmon	Mount Lemmon Survey	·	1.7 km	MPC · JPL
315804	2008 GA_{27}	—	April 3, 2008	Kitt Peak	Spacewatch	·	2.1 km	MPC · JPL
315805	2008 GV_{31}	—	April 3, 2008	Kitt Peak	Spacewatch	VER	3.2 km	MPC · JPL
315806	2008 GX_{38}	—	April 3, 2008	Mount Lemmon	Mount Lemmon Survey	·	3.6 km	MPC · JPL
315807	2008 GU_{42}	—	April 4, 2008	Mount Lemmon	Mount Lemmon Survey	·	1.6 km	MPC · JPL
315808	2008 GC_{55}	—	April 5, 2008	Mount Lemmon	Mount Lemmon Survey	·	2.1 km	MPC · JPL
315809	2008 GZ_{59}	—	April 5, 2008	Kitt Peak	Spacewatch	·	1.1 km	MPC · JPL
315810	2008 GO_{62}	—	April 5, 2008	Catalina	CSS	·	2.6 km	MPC · JPL
315811	2008 GR_{64}	—	April 6, 2008	Kitt Peak	Spacewatch	·	2.2 km	MPC · JPL
315812	2008 GL_{72}	—	April 7, 2008	Mount Lemmon	Mount Lemmon Survey	·	1.8 km	MPC · JPL
315813	2008 GE_{73}	—	April 7, 2008	Mount Lemmon	Mount Lemmon Survey	·	1.8 km	MPC · JPL
315814	2008 GL_{78}	—	April 7, 2008	Kitt Peak	Spacewatch	·	2.0 km	MPC · JPL
315815	2008 GV_{81}	—	April 8, 2008	Kitt Peak	Spacewatch	·	1.7 km	MPC · JPL
315816	2008 GF_{82}	—	April 8, 2008	Kitt Peak	Spacewatch	·	3.9 km	MPC · JPL
315817	2008 GJ_{83}	—	April 8, 2008	Kitt Peak	Spacewatch	·	2.8 km	MPC · JPL
315818	2008 GS_{88}	—	April 6, 2008	Kitt Peak	Spacewatch	·	1.7 km	MPC · JPL
315819	2008 GV_{92}	—	April 6, 2008	Mount Lemmon	Mount Lemmon Survey	EOS	3.1 km	MPC · JPL
315820	2008 GF_{93}	—	April 6, 2008	Catalina	CSS	·	1.7 km	MPC · JPL
315821	2008 GP_{95}	—	April 8, 2008	Kitt Peak	Spacewatch	MRX ·	3.4 km	MPC · JPL
315822	2008 GU_{95}	—	April 8, 2008	Kitt Peak	Spacewatch	·	2.1 km	MPC · JPL
315823	2008 GX_{96}	—	April 8, 2008	Kitt Peak	Spacewatch	·	1.6 km	MPC · JPL
315824	2008 GZ_{96}	—	April 8, 2008	Kitt Peak	Spacewatch	AGN	1.6 km	MPC · JPL
315825	2008 GT_{97}	—	April 8, 2008	Kitt Peak	Spacewatch	AGN	1.4 km	MPC · JPL
315826	2008 GP_{100}	—	April 9, 2008	Kitt Peak	Spacewatch	AST	2.0 km	MPC · JPL
315827	2008 GH_{103}	—	April 11, 2008	Kitt Peak	Spacewatch	AST	1.6 km	MPC · JPL
315828	2008 GB_{106}	—	April 11, 2008	Mount Lemmon	Mount Lemmon Survey	·	2.2 km	MPC · JPL
315829	2008 GY_{112}	—	April 13, 2008	Catalina	CSS	·	2.6 km	MPC · JPL
315830	2008 GE_{118}	—	March 29, 2008	Kitt Peak	Spacewatch	·	2.0 km	MPC · JPL
315831	2008 GY_{123}	—	April 13, 2008	Mount Lemmon	Mount Lemmon Survey	·	3.1 km	MPC · JPL
315832	2008 GA_{124}	—	April 13, 2008	Mount Lemmon	Mount Lemmon Survey	·	3.3 km	MPC · JPL
315833	2008 GG_{127}	—	April 14, 2008	Mount Lemmon	Mount Lemmon Survey	·	3.4 km	MPC · JPL
315834	2008 GD_{129}	—	April 1, 2008	Kitt Peak	Spacewatch	THM	2.6 km	MPC · JPL
315835	2008 GV_{131}	—	April 6, 2008	Kitt Peak	Spacewatch	·	2.0 km	MPC · JPL
315836	2008 GW_{133}	—	April 3, 2008	Mount Lemmon	Mount Lemmon Survey	·	2.4 km	MPC · JPL
315837	2008 GZ_{141}	—	April 12, 2008	Socorro	LINEAR	·	3.5 km	MPC · JPL
315838	2008 HD_{1}	—	April 24, 2008	Kitt Peak	Spacewatch	·	1.9 km	MPC · JPL
315839	2008 HU_{5}	—	April 24, 2008	Kitt Peak	Spacewatch	·	2.4 km	MPC · JPL
315840	2008 HU_{8}	—	April 24, 2008	Kitt Peak	Spacewatch	EOS	2.2 km	MPC · JPL
315841	2008 HW_{8}	—	April 3, 2008	Mount Lemmon	Mount Lemmon Survey	EOS	2.3 km	MPC · JPL
315842	2008 HP_{11}	—	April 24, 2008	Kitt Peak	Spacewatch	·	3.9 km	MPC · JPL
315843	2008 HE_{12}	—	April 24, 2008	Kitt Peak	Spacewatch	·	3.2 km	MPC · JPL
315844	2008 HF_{12}	—	April 24, 2008	Catalina	CSS	(5)	1.5 km	MPC · JPL
315845	2008 HE_{13}	—	April 25, 2008	Kitt Peak	Spacewatch	·	2.3 km	MPC · JPL
315846	2008 HF_{13}	—	April 25, 2008	Kitt Peak	Spacewatch	·	2.0 km	MPC · JPL
315847	2008 HP_{15}	—	April 25, 2008	Kitt Peak	Spacewatch	·	2.0 km	MPC · JPL
315848	2008 HD_{19}	—	April 26, 2008	Mount Lemmon	Mount Lemmon Survey	(13314)	1.8 km	MPC · JPL
315849	2008 HW_{19}	—	April 14, 2008	Mount Lemmon	Mount Lemmon Survey	·	3.5 km	MPC · JPL
315850	2008 HA_{26}	—	April 4, 2008	Kitt Peak	Spacewatch	·	3.6 km	MPC · JPL
315851	2008 HT_{27}	—	April 28, 2008	Kitt Peak	Spacewatch	HOF	3.0 km	MPC · JPL
315852	2008 HY_{32}	—	October 1, 2005	Kitt Peak	Spacewatch	HOF	2.7 km	MPC · JPL
315853	2008 HQ_{33}	—	April 26, 2008	Kitt Peak	Spacewatch	EOS	2.1 km	MPC · JPL
315854	2008 HJ_{34}	—	April 27, 2008	Kitt Peak	Spacewatch	·	5.8 km	MPC · JPL
315855	2008 HP_{34}	—	April 27, 2008	Kitt Peak	Spacewatch	·	2.6 km	MPC · JPL
315856	2008 HO_{36}	—	April 30, 2008	Kitt Peak	Spacewatch	·	2.8 km	MPC · JPL
315857	2008 HK_{42}	—	April 27, 2008	Kitt Peak	Spacewatch	·	3.7 km	MPC · JPL
315858	2008 HZ_{42}	—	April 27, 2008	Mount Lemmon	Mount Lemmon Survey	·	1.6 km	MPC · JPL
315859	2008 HL_{47}	—	April 28, 2008	Kitt Peak	Spacewatch	·	2.2 km	MPC · JPL
315860	2008 HN_{47}	—	April 28, 2008	Kitt Peak	Spacewatch	EOS	2.2 km	MPC · JPL
315861	2008 HC_{49}	—	April 29, 2008	Mount Lemmon	Mount Lemmon Survey	·	3.8 km	MPC · JPL
315862	2008 HV_{50}	—	April 29, 2008	Kitt Peak	Spacewatch	AEO	1.1 km	MPC · JPL
315863	2008 HX_{55}	—	April 29, 2008	Kitt Peak	Spacewatch	·	3.2 km	MPC · JPL
315864	2008 HN_{57}	—	April 30, 2008	Kitt Peak	Spacewatch	EOS	2.2 km	MPC · JPL
315865	2008 HR_{59}	—	April 30, 2008	Kitt Peak	Spacewatch	·	2.3 km	MPC · JPL
315866	2008 HW_{61}	—	April 30, 2008	Mount Lemmon	Mount Lemmon Survey	·	3.5 km	MPC · JPL
315867	2008 HN_{66}	—	April 26, 2008	Catalina	CSS	·	7.3 km	MPC · JPL
315868	2008 HJ_{67}	—	April 29, 2008	Kitt Peak	Spacewatch	·	2.3 km	MPC · JPL
315869	2008 HH_{70}	—	April 17, 2008	Mount Lemmon	Mount Lemmon Survey	·	5.7 km	MPC · JPL
315870	2008 JD_{9}	—	November 27, 2006	Mount Lemmon	Mount Lemmon Survey	·	4.9 km	MPC · JPL
315871	2008 JE_{9}	—	May 2, 2008	Kitt Peak	Spacewatch	EOS	1.8 km	MPC · JPL
315872	2008 JP_{10}	—	May 3, 2008	Mount Lemmon	Mount Lemmon Survey	·	1.8 km	MPC · JPL
315873	2008 JJ_{12}	—	May 3, 2008	Kitt Peak	Spacewatch	·	4.2 km	MPC · JPL
315874	2008 JX_{12}	—	May 3, 2008	Kitt Peak	Spacewatch	·	2.3 km	MPC · JPL
315875	2008 JB_{21}	—	May 9, 2008	Bergisch Gladbach	W. Bickel	·	3.3 km	MPC · JPL
315876	2008 JA_{24}	—	May 7, 2008	Kitt Peak	Spacewatch	·	3.5 km	MPC · JPL
315877	2008 JB_{28}	—	May 8, 2008	Kitt Peak	Spacewatch	·	2.6 km	MPC · JPL
315878	2008 JJ_{29}	—	May 12, 2008	Kitt Peak	Spacewatch	·	2.1 km	MPC · JPL
315879	2008 JT_{29}	—	May 11, 2008	Kitt Peak	Spacewatch	·	3.1 km	MPC · JPL
315880	2008 JP_{40}	—	May 14, 2008	Mount Lemmon	Mount Lemmon Survey	·	3.2 km	MPC · JPL
315881	2008 KZ	—	May 26, 2008	Kitt Peak	Spacewatch	EOS	2.6 km	MPC · JPL
315882	2008 KL_{7}	—	May 27, 2008	Kitt Peak	Spacewatch	EOS ·	4.5 km	MPC · JPL
315883	2008 KU_{8}	—	May 27, 2008	Kitt Peak	Spacewatch	·	1.6 km	MPC · JPL
315884	2008 KM_{14}	—	May 27, 2008	Kitt Peak	Spacewatch	·	3.8 km	MPC · JPL
315885	2008 KL_{17}	—	May 27, 2008	Kitt Peak	Spacewatch	·	3.6 km	MPC · JPL
315886	2008 KZ_{20}	—	May 28, 2008	Mount Lemmon	Mount Lemmon Survey	MRX	1.1 km	MPC · JPL
315887	2008 KV_{26}	—	May 29, 2008	Kitt Peak	Spacewatch	·	2.9 km	MPC · JPL
315888	2008 KG_{29}	—	May 29, 2008	Kitt Peak	Spacewatch	·	3.0 km	MPC · JPL
315889	2008 KH_{31}	—	May 29, 2008	Kitt Peak	Spacewatch	VER	3.3 km	MPC · JPL
315890	2008 KJ_{37}	—	May 29, 2008	Mount Lemmon	Mount Lemmon Survey	·	3.5 km	MPC · JPL
315891	2008 KA_{38}	—	May 30, 2008	Kitt Peak	Spacewatch	EOS	2.6 km	MPC · JPL
315892	2008 KU_{42}	—	May 31, 2008	Kitt Peak	Spacewatch	EOS	2.2 km	MPC · JPL
315893	2008 LJ_{3}	—	June 1, 2008	Kitt Peak	Spacewatch	·	4.0 km	MPC · JPL
315894	2008 LB_{4}	—	June 2, 2008	Kitt Peak	Spacewatch	·	4.1 km	MPC · JPL
315895	2008 LJ_{7}	—	June 3, 2008	Kitt Peak	Spacewatch	·	3.9 km	MPC · JPL
315896	2008 LZ_{9}	—	June 6, 2008	Kitt Peak	Spacewatch	·	2.6 km	MPC · JPL
315897	2008 QZ_{2}	—	August 24, 2008	Dauban	Kugel, F.	H	650 m	MPC · JPL
315898	2008 QD_{4}	—	August 25, 2008	La Sagra	OAM	T_{j} (2.38) · centaur	30 km	MPC · JPL
315899	2008 QG_{20}	—	August 30, 2008	Alter Satzberg	Pietschnig, M.	·	4.0 km	MPC · JPL
315900	2008 QX_{20}	—	August 26, 2008	Socorro	LINEAR	·	3.9 km	MPC · JPL

== 315901–316000 ==
back to top

Designation			Discovery			Properties		Ref
Permanent	Provisional	Named after	Date	Site	Discoverer(s)	Category	Diam.	Ref
315901	2008 QY_{36}	—	August 21, 2008	Kitt Peak	Spacewatch	L4	7.7 km	MPC · JPL
315902	2008 QS_{40}	—	August 24, 2008	Kitt Peak	Spacewatch	L4	9.2 km	MPC · JPL
315903	2008 QJ_{42}	—	August 24, 2008	Kitt Peak	Spacewatch	L4	11 km	MPC · JPL
315904	2008 RD_{1}	—	September 2, 2008	Calvin-Rehoboth	L. A. Molnar	LIX	5.8 km	MPC · JPL
315905	2008 RC_{2}	—	September 2, 2008	Kitt Peak	Spacewatch	L4	8.6 km	MPC · JPL
315906	2008 RD_{4}	—	September 2, 2008	Kitt Peak	Spacewatch	L4	8.4 km	MPC · JPL
315907	2008 RF_{20}	—	September 4, 2008	Kitt Peak	Spacewatch	L4	9.5 km	MPC · JPL
315908	2008 RX_{33}	—	September 2, 2008	Kitt Peak	Spacewatch	HIL · 3:2	7.1 km	MPC · JPL
315909	2008 RO_{63}	—	February 13, 2002	Kitt Peak	Spacewatch	L4	9.2 km	MPC · JPL
315910	2008 RH_{64}	—	September 4, 2008	Kitt Peak	Spacewatch	L4	13 km	MPC · JPL
315911	2008 RH_{67}	—	September 4, 2008	Kitt Peak	Spacewatch	L4	13 km	MPC · JPL
315912	2008 RT_{85}	—	September 5, 2008	Kitt Peak	Spacewatch	·	4.3 km	MPC · JPL
315913	2008 RP_{109}	—	September 2, 2008	Kitt Peak	Spacewatch	L4	7.2 km	MPC · JPL
315914	2008 RE_{113}	—	September 5, 2008	Kitt Peak	Spacewatch	L4	8.5 km	MPC · JPL
315915	2008 RB_{123}	—	September 5, 2008	Kitt Peak	Spacewatch	L4	8.9 km	MPC · JPL
315916	2008 RO_{124}	—	September 6, 2008	Mount Lemmon	Mount Lemmon Survey	L4	9.8 km	MPC · JPL
315917	2008 RO_{125}	—	September 7, 2008	Mount Lemmon	Mount Lemmon Survey	L4	7.0 km	MPC · JPL
315918	2008 RT_{126}	—	September 4, 2008	Kitt Peak	Spacewatch	L4 · ERY	8.4 km	MPC · JPL
315919	2008 RG_{127}	—	September 6, 2008	Kitt Peak	Spacewatch	L4	9.2 km	MPC · JPL
315920	2008 RG_{145}	—	September 6, 2008	Kitt Peak	Spacewatch	·	3.3 km	MPC · JPL
315921	2008 SL_{23}	—	September 19, 2008	Kitt Peak	Spacewatch	L4	9.2 km	MPC · JPL
315922	2008 SW_{28}	—	September 19, 2008	Kitt Peak	Spacewatch	L4	9.1 km	MPC · JPL
315923	2008 SM_{39}	—	September 20, 2008	Kitt Peak	Spacewatch	L4	10 km	MPC · JPL
315924	2008 SX_{85}	—	September 20, 2008	Kitt Peak	Spacewatch	HIL · 3:2 · (6124)	6.5 km	MPC · JPL
315925	2008 SE_{96}	—	September 21, 2008	Kitt Peak	Spacewatch	L4	9.6 km	MPC · JPL
315926	2008 SW_{149}	—	September 29, 2008	Dauban	Kugel, F.	L4	10 km	MPC · JPL
315927	2008 SS_{150}	—	September 28, 2008	Socorro	LINEAR	H	770 m	MPC · JPL
315928	2008 SP_{198}	—	September 25, 2008	Bergisch Gladbach	W. Bickel	L4	10 km	MPC · JPL
315929	2008 SQ_{219}	—	September 30, 2008	La Sagra	OAM	·	6.7 km	MPC · JPL
315930	2008 SG_{221}	—	March 4, 2005	Kitt Peak	Spacewatch	HIL · 3:2 · (6124)	8.1 km	MPC · JPL
315931	2008 SY_{233}	—	September 28, 2008	Mount Lemmon	Mount Lemmon Survey	L4	9.9 km	MPC · JPL
315932	2008 SX_{274}	—	September 22, 2008	Kitt Peak	Spacewatch	L4	9.9 km	MPC · JPL
315933	2008 SR_{275}	—	September 23, 2008	Kitt Peak	Spacewatch	L4	10 km	MPC · JPL
315934	2008 SV_{279}	—	September 24, 2008	Mount Lemmon	Mount Lemmon Survey	L4	11 km	MPC · JPL
315935	2008 TK_{15}	—	October 1, 2008	Mount Lemmon	Mount Lemmon Survey	L4	6.6 km	MPC · JPL
315936	2008 TD_{29}	—	October 1, 2008	Mount Lemmon	Mount Lemmon Survey	L4	15 km	MPC · JPL
315937	2008 TE_{49}	—	October 2, 2008	Kitt Peak	Spacewatch	L4	8.0 km	MPC · JPL
315938	2008 TV_{49}	—	October 2, 2008	Kitt Peak	Spacewatch	L4	9.7 km	MPC · JPL
315939	2008 TN_{59}	—	October 2, 2008	Kitt Peak	Spacewatch	L4	7.7 km	MPC · JPL
315940	2008 TJ_{85}	—	October 3, 2008	Mount Lemmon	Mount Lemmon Survey	L4	11 km	MPC · JPL
315941 Elenagómez	2008 TE_{91}	Elenagómez	October 3, 2008	La Sagra	OAM	L4	8.0 km	MPC · JPL
315942	2008 TG_{101}	—	October 6, 2008	Kitt Peak	Spacewatch	L4	10 km	MPC · JPL
315943	2008 TY_{116}	—	October 6, 2008	Mount Lemmon	Mount Lemmon Survey	L4	9.3 km	MPC · JPL
315944	2008 TN_{118}	—	October 7, 2008	Kitt Peak	Spacewatch	L4	10 km	MPC · JPL
315945	2008 TR_{118}	—	October 7, 2008	Kitt Peak	Spacewatch	L4	8.5 km	MPC · JPL
315946	2008 TL_{121}	—	October 7, 2008	Mount Lemmon	Mount Lemmon Survey	H	660 m	MPC · JPL
315947	2008 TL_{122}	—	October 7, 2008	Catalina	CSS	H	660 m	MPC · JPL
315948	2008 TL_{125}	—	October 8, 2008	Mount Lemmon	Mount Lemmon Survey	L4	9.2 km	MPC · JPL
315949	2008 TJ_{126}	—	October 8, 2008	Mount Lemmon	Mount Lemmon Survey	L4 · ERY	10 km	MPC · JPL
315950	2008 TT_{127}	—	October 8, 2008	Mount Lemmon	Mount Lemmon Survey	L4 · ERY	9.4 km	MPC · JPL
315951	2008 TL_{144}	—	October 9, 2008	Mount Lemmon	Mount Lemmon Survey	L4	7.4 km	MPC · JPL
315952	2008 TO_{148}	—	October 9, 2008	Mount Lemmon	Mount Lemmon Survey	L4	10 km	MPC · JPL
315953	2008 TK_{150}	—	October 9, 2008	Mount Lemmon	Mount Lemmon Survey	L4	8.0 km	MPC · JPL
315954	2008 TJ_{176}	—	October 7, 2008	Kitt Peak	Spacewatch	L4 · ERY	9.4 km	MPC · JPL
315955	2008 UJ_{4}	—	October 24, 2008	Socorro	LINEAR	H	710 m	MPC · JPL
315956	2008 UJ_{9}	—	September 24, 2008	Kitt Peak	Spacewatch	L4	10 km	MPC · JPL
315957	2008 UO_{9}	—	October 17, 2008	Kitt Peak	Spacewatch	L4	10 km	MPC · JPL
315958	2008 UR_{59}	—	October 21, 2008	Mount Lemmon	Mount Lemmon Survey	L4	9.9 km	MPC · JPL
315959	2008 US_{83}	—	October 22, 2008	Mount Lemmon	Mount Lemmon Survey	H	670 m	MPC · JPL
315960	2008 UB_{190}	—	October 25, 2008	Mount Lemmon	Mount Lemmon Survey	L4	9.0 km	MPC · JPL
315961	2008 UO_{202}	—	October 26, 2008	Socorro	LINEAR	H	560 m	MPC · JPL
315962	2008 UY_{202}	—	October 28, 2008	Socorro	LINEAR	H	540 m	MPC · JPL
315963	2008 VV_{2}	—	November 2, 2008	Socorro	LINEAR	H	620 m	MPC · JPL
315964	2008 WH_{17}	—	November 17, 2008	Kitt Peak	Spacewatch	L4	8.7 km	MPC · JPL
315965	2008 WA_{90}	—	November 22, 2008	Mount Lemmon	Mount Lemmon Survey	H	870 m	MPC · JPL
315966	2008 WA_{97}	—	November 18, 2008	Catalina	CSS	H	830 m	MPC · JPL
315967	2008 XJ_{15}	—	December 2, 2008	Catalina	CSS	H	720 m	MPC · JPL
315968	2008 YG_{24}	—	December 19, 2008	Hibiscus	Teamo, N.	·	3.3 km	MPC · JPL
315969	2009 AB_{33}	—	January 15, 2009	Kitt Peak	Spacewatch	·	1.1 km	MPC · JPL
315970	2009 AP_{33}	—	January 15, 2009	Kitt Peak	Spacewatch	·	1.1 km	MPC · JPL
315971	2009 BY_{110}	—	January 31, 2009	Mount Lemmon	Mount Lemmon Survey	·	840 m	MPC · JPL
315972	2009 BA_{113}	—	January 31, 2009	Mount Lemmon	Mount Lemmon Survey	·	710 m	MPC · JPL
315973	2009 BJ_{145}	—	January 30, 2009	Kitt Peak	Spacewatch	·	640 m	MPC · JPL
315974	2009 BR_{156}	—	January 31, 2009	Kitt Peak	Spacewatch	·	1.4 km	MPC · JPL
315975	2009 BX_{156}	—	January 31, 2009	Kitt Peak	Spacewatch	·	1.1 km	MPC · JPL
315976	2009 CN_{11}	—	February 1, 2009	Mount Lemmon	Mount Lemmon Survey	·	780 m	MPC · JPL
315977	2009 CW_{11}	—	February 1, 2009	Kitt Peak	Spacewatch	VER	5.4 km	MPC · JPL
315978	2009 CQ_{14}	—	February 1, 2009	Kitt Peak	Spacewatch	·	790 m	MPC · JPL
315979	2009 CC_{23}	—	February 1, 2009	Kitt Peak	Spacewatch	·	790 m	MPC · JPL
315980	2009 CY_{35}	—	February 2, 2009	Mount Lemmon	Mount Lemmon Survey	·	1.1 km	MPC · JPL
315981	2009 CY_{43}	—	February 14, 2009	Kitt Peak	Spacewatch	·	910 m	MPC · JPL
315982	2009 CZ_{58}	—	February 4, 2009	Mount Lemmon	Mount Lemmon Survey	·	770 m	MPC · JPL
315983	2009 CB_{60}	—	February 5, 2009	Kitt Peak	Spacewatch	·	930 m	MPC · JPL
315984	2009 CO_{64}	—	February 3, 2009	Kitt Peak	Spacewatch	·	810 m	MPC · JPL
315985	2009 CE_{65}	—	February 5, 2009	Mount Lemmon	Mount Lemmon Survey	·	900 m	MPC · JPL
315986	2009 DU_{5}	—	February 16, 2009	Kitt Peak	Spacewatch	·	1.1 km	MPC · JPL
315987	2009 DA_{16}	—	February 16, 2009	La Sagra	OAM	·	650 m	MPC · JPL
315988	2009 DR_{31}	—	February 20, 2009	Kitt Peak	Spacewatch	·	960 m	MPC · JPL
315989	2009 DU_{42}	—	February 21, 2009	La Sagra	OAM	·	860 m	MPC · JPL
315990	2009 DZ_{50}	—	February 19, 2009	Kitt Peak	Spacewatch	·	920 m	MPC · JPL
315991	2009 DA_{64}	—	February 22, 2009	Kitt Peak	Spacewatch	·	910 m	MPC · JPL
315992	2009 DN_{64}	—	February 22, 2009	Kitt Peak	Spacewatch	·	1.2 km	MPC · JPL
315993	2009 DQ_{77}	—	March 25, 2006	Kitt Peak	Spacewatch	·	820 m	MPC · JPL
315994	2009 DT_{86}	—	February 27, 2009	Kitt Peak	Spacewatch	·	960 m	MPC · JPL
315995	2009 DG_{97}	—	February 26, 2009	Kitt Peak	Spacewatch	·	900 m	MPC · JPL
315996	2009 DW_{116}	—	February 27, 2009	Kitt Peak	Spacewatch	·	700 m	MPC · JPL
315997	2009 DQ_{117}	—	February 27, 2009	Kitt Peak	Spacewatch	NYS	1.3 km	MPC · JPL
315998	2009 DG_{125}	—	February 19, 2009	Kitt Peak	Spacewatch	·	1.1 km	MPC · JPL
315999	2009 DP_{127}	—	February 20, 2009	Kitt Peak	Spacewatch	·	590 m	MPC · JPL
316000	2009 DF_{128}	—	February 21, 2009	Kitt Peak	Spacewatch	·	730 m	MPC · JPL

back to top

== See also ==
- Meanings of minor-planet names: 315001–316000
