= Meanings of minor-planet names: 315001–316000 =

As minor planet discoveries are confirmed, they are given a permanent number by the IAU's Minor Planet Center (MPC), and the discoverers can then submit names for them, following the IAU's naming conventions. The list below concerns those minor planets in the specified number-range that have received names, and explains the meanings of those names.

Official naming citations of newly named small Solar System bodies are approved and published in a bulletin by IAU's Working Group for Small Bodies Nomenclature (WGSBN). Before May 2021, citations were published in MPC's Minor Planet Circulars for many decades. Recent citations can also be found on the JPL Small-Body Database (SBDB). Until his death in 2016, German astronomer Lutz D. Schmadel compiled these citations into the Dictionary of Minor Planet Names (DMP) and regularly updated the collection.

Based on Paul Herget's The Names of the Minor Planets, Schmadel also researched the unclear origin of numerous asteroids, most of which had been named prior to World War II. This article incorporates text from this source, which is in the public domain: SBDB New namings may only be added to this list below after official publication as the preannouncement of names is condemned. The WGSBN publishes a comprehensive guideline for the naming rules of non-cometary small Solar System bodies.

== 315001–315100 ==
Named minor planet	Provisional	This minor planet was named for...	Ref · Catalog
315012 Hutchings	2007 BD_{31}	John Barrie Hutchings (born 1941), an astrophysicist who uses observations from the entire electromagnetic spectrum to probe intrinsically luminous stars, X-ray binaries, neutron stars and stellar-mass black holes, as well as active galactic nuclei and quasars.	JPL · 315012
315046 Gianniferrari	2007 CG_{51}	Gianni Ferrari (born 1938) is the founder of the Modena Amateur Astronomers Group. He has given many lectures and written several articles and computer programs and also two books about sundial calculations.	JPL · 315046
315088 Daniels	2007 DT_{84}	Steven W. Daniels (born 1959), a Physics Professor and department chair at Eastern Illinois University.	JPL · 315088

== 315101–315200 ==
back to top

Named minor planet	Provisional	This minor planet was named for...	Ref · Catalog
315166 Pawelmaksym	2007 GA_{4}	Pawel Maksym (1983–2013), an astronomy popularizer in Poland.	MPC · 315166
315174 Sellek	2007 HG_{5}	Douglas J. Sellek (1945–1996), a middle-school science teacher and an advocate of the sciences	JPL · 315174
315186 Schade	2007 LD_{30}	David Joseph Schade (born 1953), who has served as leader for the NRC-Canadian Astronomy Data Centre since 2001, which has contributed numerous innovations to data management for, inter alia, HST, CFHT, Gemini, JCMT and MOST observatories and to the Virtual Observatory.	JPL · 315186

== 315201–315300 ==
back to top

Named minor planet	Provisional	This minor planet was named for...	Ref · Catalog
315218 La Boétie	2007 RR_{133}	Étienne de La Boétie (1530–1563) was a French writer and a founder of modern political philosophy.	JPL · 315218
315276 Yurigradovsky	2007 TK_{91}	Yuri Grygorovych Gradovsky (born 1956), a history teacher by education, is a Ukrainian composer, and the founder and leader of the Drevlyany music band of the Zhytomyr Philharmonic.	JPL · 315276

== 315301–315400 ==
back to top

Named minor planet	Provisional	This minor planet was named for...	Ref · Catalog
There are no named minor planets in this number range

== 315401–315500 ==
back to top

Named minor planet	Provisional	This minor planet was named for...	Ref · Catalog
315493 Zimin	2008 AE_{2}	Dmitry Borisovich Zimin (born 1933), a Russian scientist and inventor.	JPL · 315493

== 315501–315600 ==
back to top

Named minor planet	Provisional	This minor planet was named for...	Ref · Catalog
315529 Claudinefrieden	2008 AN_{120}	Claudine Frieden, Swiss administrator who has supported the International Foundation High Altitude Research Stations Jungfraujoch and Gornergrat's administrative work for over 13 years.	IAU · 315529
315577 Carmenchu	2008 CB_{70}	Carmen Castillo Bartolomé (born 1959), a Spanish artist.	JPL · 315577
315579 Vandersyppe	2008 CH_{74}	Anne Vandersyppe (1958–2019) was a member of the Solar Physics and Space Weather department of the Royal Observatory of Belgium.	IAU · 315579

== 315601–315700 ==
back to top

Named minor planet	Provisional	This minor planet was named for...	Ref · Catalog
There are no named minor planets in this number range

== 315701–315800 ==
back to top

Named minor planet	Provisional	This minor planet was named for...	Ref · Catalog
There are no named minor planets in this number range

== 315801–315900 ==
back to top

Named minor planet	Provisional	This minor planet was named for...	Ref · Catalog
There are no named minor planets in this number range

== 315901–316000 ==
back to top

Named minor planet	Provisional	This minor planet was named for...	Ref · Catalog
315941 Elenagómez	2008 TE_{91}	Elena Gómez Servera (born 1985), the only Spanish artistic gymnast to have been world champion, winning the gold medal at the 2002 World Championships in Hungary.	IAU · 315941

back to top

Preceded by 314,001–315,000	Meanings of minor-planet names List of minor planets: 315,001–316,000	Succeeded by 316,001–317,000
