= Zhang Xiangtong =

Chinese neurophysiologist and academician (1907-2007)

- Born: November 27, 1907; Zhengding, Hebei, Qing dynasty
- Died: November 4, 2007 (aged 99); Shanghai, China
- Education: Peking University; Yale University
- Scientific career
- Fields: Neuroscience; Physiology
- Workplaces: Yale School of Medicine; Rockefeller Institute for Medical Research; Shanghai Institutes for Biological Sciences, CAS
- Academic advisors: John Farquhar Fulton, Clinton N. Woolsey

Chinese name
- Traditional Chinese: 張香桐
- Simplified Chinese: 张香桐
Transcriptions
Standard Mandarin
- Hanyu Pinyin: Zhāng Xiāngtóng
- Wade–Giles: Chang Hsiang-t'ung

Zhang Xiangtong (Chinese: 张香桐; November 27, 1907 – November 4, 2007), also romanized as Hsiang-Tung Chang, was a Chinese neurophysiologist and an academician of Chinese Academy of Sciences (CAS).

== Career ==
He carried out fundamental studies on the structure and function of the central nervous system. Chang was one of the pioneers in the study of dendritic potentials and among the first to recognize the functional significance of dendrites in the central nervous system. He was the first to propose a fundamental distinction between axosomatic and axodendritic synapses.

Chang was regarded as one of founders of China's neuroscience. He helped found Shanghai Institute of Brain Research of CAS (later Institute of Neuroscience of CAS), which is a part of Shanghai Institutes for Biological Sciences nowadays.

Chang was born in Zhengding, Hebei Province. He graduated from the Department of Psychology, Peking University in 1933, and obtained a doctor of philosophy in physiology from Yale University in the United States in 1946. From 1948 to 1952, Chang was an assistant professor at Yale School of Medicine. From 1952 to 1956, Chang was an associate researcher at Rockefeller Institute for Medical Research. After his return to China in late 1956, he served as a research fellow at Shanghai Institute of Physiology of CAS. He became the director of Shanghai Institute of Brain Research of CAS in 1980 and, since his retirement in 1984, the honorary director of the Institute.

In the 1940s and 50s, Chang focused on auditory, visual and sensorimotor systems.

== Awards and honors ==
- Chang was elected a foreign academician of the USSR Academy of Sciences in 1966, an honorary foreign member of Royal Academy of Medicine of Belgium in 1982 and an honorary member of International Association for the Study of Pain in 1989.
- He received the Lifetime Achievement Award from International Neural Network Society in 1993.
- Asteroid 316450 Changhsiangtung, discovered by the PMO NEO Survey Program at Purple Mountain in 2008, was named in his memory. The official naming citation was published by the Minor Planet Center on February 5, 2020 (M.P.C. 121135).
