= Meanings of minor-planet names: 316001–317000 =

As minor planet discoveries are confirmed, they are given a permanent number by the IAU's Minor Planet Center (MPC), and the discoverers can then submit names for them, following the IAU's naming conventions. The list below concerns those minor planets in the specified number-range that have received names, and explains the meanings of those names.

Official naming citations of newly named small Solar System bodies are approved and published in a bulletin by IAU's Working Group for Small Bodies Nomenclature (WGSBN). Before May 2021, citations were published in MPC's Minor Planet Circulars for many decades. Recent citations can also be found on the JPL Small-Body Database (SBDB). Until his death in 2016, German astronomer Lutz D. Schmadel compiled these citations into the Dictionary of Minor Planet Names (DMP) and regularly updated the collection.

Based on Paul Herget's The Names of the Minor Planets, Schmadel also researched the unclear origin of numerous asteroids, most of which had been named prior to World War II. This article incorporates text from this source, which is in the public domain: SBDB New namings may only be added to this list below after official publication as the preannouncement of names is condemned. The WGSBN publishes a comprehensive guideline for the naming rules of non-cometary small Solar System bodies.

== 316001–316100 ==
Named minor planet	Provisional	This minor planet was named for...	Ref · Catalog
316010 Daviddubey	2009 FC_{5}	David Richard Jacob Dubey (born 1997), a grandson of British discoverer Norman Falla	JPL · 316010
316020 Linshuhow	2009 FV_{29}	Jeremy Lin (Jeremy Shu-How Lin; born 1988), an American professional basketball player in NBA	JPL · 316020
316028 Patrickwils	2009 FR_{45}	Patrick Wils (born 1960), a Belgian amateur astronomer.	JPL · 316028
316039 Breizh	2009 GB_{3}	Breizh (Brittany) is the Breton name of a historical and cultural region in northwestern France, and one of the six so-called Celtic nations.	IAU · 316039
316042 Tilofranz	2009 HP_{2}	Tilo Franz Schwab (born 2008), son of German discoverer Erwin Schwab	JPL · 316042
316080 Boni	2009 KD	Boniface Alfonsi (born 1950) is a Corsican retired private detective and author. He wrote La vérité est mon métier in 2012. The discoverer met him under the night sky of Erbaghjolu in 2020.	IAU · 316080
316084 Mykolapokropyvny	2009 KT_{8}	Mykola Petrovych Pokropyvny (born 1966), the director of the Ivan Ogienko Zhytomyr College of Culture and Arts.	JPL · 316084

== 316101–316200 ==
back to top

Named minor planet	Provisional	This minor planet was named for...	Ref · Catalog
316138 Giorgione	2009 SL_{170}	Giorgione (1477–1510) was an Italian painter of the Venetian school in the High Renaissance from Venice.	JPL · 316138
316186 Kathrynjoyce	2010 KJ_{41}	Kathryn Mainzer (born 1946), an American artist and graphic designer who is the mother of Amy Mainzer, PI of the NEOWISE mission.	JPL · 316186

== 316201–316300 ==
back to top

Named minor planet	Provisional	This minor planet was named for...	Ref · Catalog
316201 Malala	2010 ML_{48}	Malala Yousafzai (born 1997), a Pakistani human rights activist who advocates for the rights of women and girls and worldwide access to education.	JPL · 316201
316202 Johnfowler	2010 MX_{54}	John Fowler (born 1942), an American scientist.	JPL · 316202

== 316301–316400 ==
back to top

Named minor planet	Provisional	This minor planet was named for...	Ref · Catalog
There are no named minor planets in this number range

== 316401–316500 ==
back to top

Named minor planet	Provisional	This minor planet was named for...	Ref · Catalog
316450 Changhsiangtung	2010 UZ_{71}	Zhang Xiangtong (1907–2007), an academician of the Chinese Academy of Sciences, was a leader of neurophysiology and a founder of neuroscience in China. He was the first to discover dendritic functions of neurons in the brain.	JPL · 316450

== 316501–316600 ==
back to top

Named minor planet	Provisional	This minor planet was named for...	Ref · Catalog
316527 Jürgenoberst	2010 VW_{201}	Jürgen Oberst (born 1955), a German planetary scientist and expert in remote sensing at the Planetary Geodesy Department of the German Aerospace Center, and a professor for Planetary Geodesy at Technische Universität Berlin.	IAU · 316527

== 316601–316700 ==
back to top

Named minor planet	Provisional	This minor planet was named for...	Ref · Catalog
There are no named minor planets in this number range

== 316701–316800 ==
back to top

Named minor planet	Provisional	This minor planet was named for...	Ref · Catalog
316709 POSS	1997 EE_{60}	The Palomar Observatory Sky Surveys (POSS) a major astronomical survey conducted at Palomar Observatory using the Samuel Oschin telescope. POSS-I was undertaken from 1949 to 1958, while POSS-II took from 1987 until 2002. The discovery of this minor planet is based on two photographic plates obtained from the second survey.	IAU · 316709
316741 Janefletcher	1998 WS_{44}	Jane Fletcher (born 1967), the producer of the BBC television programme The Sky at Night from 2002 to 2013.	JPL · 316741

== 316801–316900 ==
back to top

Named minor planet	Provisional	This minor planet was named for...	Ref · Catalog
There are no named minor planets in this number range

== 316901–317000 ==
back to top

Named minor planet	Provisional	This minor planet was named for...	Ref · Catalog
317000 Simonepastore	2001 PY_{28}	Simone Pastore (b. 1986), an Italian amateur astronomer.	IAU · 317000

back to top

Preceded by 315,001–316,000	Meanings of minor-planet names List of minor planets: 316,001–317,000	Succeeded by 317,001–318,000
