= List of minor planets: 316001–317000 =

The following is a partial list of minor planets, running from minor-planet number 316001 through 317000, inclusive. The primary data for this and other partial lists is based on JPL's "Small-Body Orbital Elements" and data available from the Minor Planet Center. Critical list information is also provided by the MPC, unless otherwise specified from Lowell Observatory. A detailed description of the table's columns and additional sources are given on the main page including a complete list of every page in this series, and a statistical break-up on the dynamical classification of minor planets.

Also see the summary list of all named bodies in numerical and alphabetical order, and the corresponding naming citations for the number range of this particular list. New namings may only be added to this list after official publication, as the preannouncement of names is condemned by the Working Group for Small Bodies Nomenclature of the International Astronomical Union.

Near-Earth obj.	MBA (inner)	MBA (outer)	Centaur
Mars-crosser	MBA (middle)	Jupiter trojan	Trans-Neptunian obj.
Unclassified

== 316001–316100 ==
Designation			Discovery			Properties		Ref
Permanent	Provisional	Named after	Date	Site	Discoverer(s)	Category	Diam.	Ref
316001	2009 EN_{4}	—	March 15, 2009	La Sagra	OAM	·	890 m	MPC · JPL
316002	2009 EK_{13}	—	March 15, 2009	Catalina	CSS	·	1.4 km	MPC · JPL
316003	2009 ED_{16}	—	March 15, 2009	Kitt Peak	Spacewatch	·	610 m	MPC · JPL
316004	2009 EV_{17}	—	March 15, 2009	Kitt Peak	Spacewatch	·	680 m	MPC · JPL
316005	2009 EC_{21}	—	March 15, 2009	La Sagra	OAM	·	970 m	MPC · JPL
316006	2009 EN_{22}	—	March 2, 2009	Mount Lemmon	Mount Lemmon Survey	·	850 m	MPC · JPL
316007	2009 EU_{25}	—	March 7, 2009	Mount Lemmon	Mount Lemmon Survey	·	810 m	MPC · JPL
316008	2009 FQ_{1}	—	March 16, 2009	La Sagra	OAM	·	1.3 km	MPC · JPL
316009	2009 FE_{3}	—	March 18, 2009	Mayhill	Lowe, A.	·	720 m	MPC · JPL
316010 Daviddubey	2009 FC_{5}	Daviddubey	March 19, 2009	Mayhill	Falla, N.	·	750 m	MPC · JPL
316011	2009 FC_{16}	—	March 17, 2009	Kitt Peak	Spacewatch	·	970 m	MPC · JPL
316012	2009 FE_{17}	—	March 16, 2009	La Sagra	OAM	·	880 m	MPC · JPL
316013	2009 FQ_{17}	—	March 17, 2009	La Sagra	OAM	·	880 m	MPC · JPL
316014	2009 FJ_{19}	—	March 19, 2009	Hibiscus	Teamo, N.	·	750 m	MPC · JPL
316015	2009 FC_{21}	—	March 19, 2009	Mount Lemmon	Mount Lemmon Survey	·	1.2 km	MPC · JPL
316016	2009 FO_{21}	—	March 22, 2009	Vicques	M. Ory	·	710 m	MPC · JPL
316017	2009 FS_{22}	—	March 19, 2009	Kitt Peak	Spacewatch	·	1 km	MPC · JPL
316018	2009 FC_{24}	—	March 19, 2009	La Sagra	OAM	·	810 m	MPC · JPL
316019	2009 FY_{24}	—	March 22, 2009	La Sagra	OAM	·	1.2 km	MPC · JPL
316020 Linshuhow	2009 FV_{29}	Linshuhow	March 21, 2009	Lulin	Tsai, Y.-S., T. Chen	·	720 m	MPC · JPL
316021	2009 FP_{30}	—	March 25, 2009	Sierra Stars	Tozzi, F.	·	1.3 km	MPC · JPL
316022	2009 FF_{36}	—	March 26, 2009	Mount Lemmon	Mount Lemmon Survey	·	680 m	MPC · JPL
316023	2009 FL_{37}	—	March 24, 2009	Mount Lemmon	Mount Lemmon Survey	·	810 m	MPC · JPL
316024	2009 FA_{39}	—	March 21, 2009	Catalina	CSS	·	1.3 km	MPC · JPL
316025	2009 FU_{41}	—	March 26, 2009	Mount Lemmon	Mount Lemmon Survey	·	690 m	MPC · JPL
316026	2009 FS_{42}	—	March 28, 2009	Kitt Peak	Spacewatch	·	840 m	MPC · JPL
316027	2009 FE_{45}	—	March 27, 2009	Kitt Peak	Spacewatch	·	890 m	MPC · JPL
316028 Patrickwils	2009 FR_{45}	Patrickwils	March 31, 2009	Uccle	P. De Cat	·	890 m	MPC · JPL
316029	2009 FC_{46}	—	March 28, 2009	Kitt Peak	Spacewatch	MAS	910 m	MPC · JPL
316030	2009 FF_{47}	—	March 28, 2009	Kitt Peak	Spacewatch	·	1.5 km	MPC · JPL
316031	2009 FN_{48}	—	March 24, 2009	Mount Lemmon	Mount Lemmon Survey	·	1.5 km	MPC · JPL
316032	2009 FX_{53}	—	March 29, 2009	Mount Lemmon	Mount Lemmon Survey	·	1.4 km	MPC · JPL
316033	2009 FW_{63}	—	March 29, 2009	Kitt Peak	Spacewatch	·	890 m	MPC · JPL
316034	2009 FL_{67}	—	March 19, 2009	Mount Lemmon	Mount Lemmon Survey	·	740 m	MPC · JPL
316035	2009 FK_{68}	—	October 18, 2007	Kitt Peak	Spacewatch	·	690 m	MPC · JPL
316036	2009 FC_{69}	—	March 16, 2009	Kitt Peak	Spacewatch	·	950 m	MPC · JPL
316037	2009 FK_{71}	—	March 31, 2009	Mount Lemmon	Mount Lemmon Survey	·	1.0 km	MPC · JPL
316038	2009 FH_{76}	—	March 26, 2009	Kitt Peak	Spacewatch	MAS	670 m	MPC · JPL
316039 Breizh	2009 GB_{3}	Breizh	April 14, 2009	Vicques	M. Ory	·	800 m	MPC · JPL
316040	2009 HX	—	April 16, 2009	Catalina	CSS	NYS	900 m	MPC · JPL
316041	2009 HH_{1}	—	April 17, 2009	Kitt Peak	Spacewatch	·	820 m	MPC · JPL
316042 Tilofranz	2009 HP_{2}	Tilofranz	April 19, 2009	Tzec Maun	E. Schwab	ERI	1.4 km	MPC · JPL
316043	2009 HY_{2}	—	April 16, 2009	Catalina	CSS	·	920 m	MPC · JPL
316044	2009 HQ_{7}	—	April 17, 2009	Kitt Peak	Spacewatch	(2076)	870 m	MPC · JPL
316045	2009 HA_{8}	—	April 17, 2009	Kitt Peak	Spacewatch	·	720 m	MPC · JPL
316046	2009 HC_{16}	—	April 18, 2009	Kitt Peak	Spacewatch	·	890 m	MPC · JPL
316047	2009 HN_{25}	—	April 17, 2009	Catalina	CSS	·	1 km	MPC · JPL
316048	2009 HO_{41}	—	April 20, 2009	Kitt Peak	Spacewatch	·	710 m	MPC · JPL
316049	2009 HT_{41}	—	April 20, 2009	Kitt Peak	Spacewatch	·	870 m	MPC · JPL
316050	2009 HQ_{45}	—	April 21, 2009	La Sagra	OAM	·	720 m	MPC · JPL
316051	2009 HV_{45}	—	April 21, 2009	La Sagra	OAM	·	1.1 km	MPC · JPL
316052	2009 HP_{52}	—	April 17, 2009	Catalina	CSS	·	880 m	MPC · JPL
316053	2009 HK_{53}	—	April 19, 2009	Catalina	CSS	·	3.5 km	MPC · JPL
316054	2009 HH_{54}	—	April 20, 2009	Kitt Peak	Spacewatch	·	1.5 km	MPC · JPL
316055	2009 HB_{57}	—	April 22, 2009	Kitt Peak	Spacewatch	(2076)	790 m	MPC · JPL
316056	2009 HS_{57}	—	April 24, 2009	Tzec Maun	Karge, S.	V	890 m	MPC · JPL
316057	2009 HS_{60}	—	August 28, 2006	Catalina	CSS	MAS	830 m	MPC · JPL
316058	2009 HA_{61}	—	April 20, 2009	Mount Lemmon	Mount Lemmon Survey	·	710 m	MPC · JPL
316059	2009 HC_{64}	—	April 22, 2009	Kitt Peak	Spacewatch	·	1.1 km	MPC · JPL
316060	2009 HP_{65}	—	November 23, 2006	Mount Lemmon	Mount Lemmon Survey	·	2.2 km	MPC · JPL
316061	2009 HL_{75}	—	April 28, 2009	Catalina	CSS	·	980 m	MPC · JPL
316062	2009 HQ_{77}	—	April 23, 2009	La Sagra	OAM	NYS	1.0 km	MPC · JPL
316063	2009 HT_{77}	—	April 23, 2009	La Sagra	OAM	·	850 m	MPC · JPL
316064	2009 HB_{80}	—	April 27, 2009	Purple Mountain	PMO NEO Survey Program	BRG	2.2 km	MPC · JPL
316065	2009 HR_{80}	—	April 28, 2009	Catalina	CSS	V	760 m	MPC · JPL
316066	2009 HA_{83}	—	April 26, 2009	Siding Spring	SSS	·	1.3 km	MPC · JPL
316067	2009 HC_{83}	—	April 27, 2009	Kitt Peak	Spacewatch	·	610 m	MPC · JPL
316068	2009 HO_{94}	—	April 28, 2009	Cerro Burek	Burek, Cerro	·	950 m	MPC · JPL
316069	2009 HG_{98}	—	April 20, 2009	Kitt Peak	Spacewatch	·	880 m	MPC · JPL
316070	2009 HR_{98}	—	April 28, 2009	Mount Lemmon	Mount Lemmon Survey	MAS	760 m	MPC · JPL
316071	2009 HZ_{98}	—	April 21, 2009	Kitt Peak	Spacewatch	·	1.4 km	MPC · JPL
316072	2009 HW_{99}	—	April 22, 2009	Mount Lemmon	Mount Lemmon Survey	·	870 m	MPC · JPL
316073	2009 HX_{101}	—	April 18, 2009	Kitt Peak	Spacewatch	MAR	1.4 km	MPC · JPL
316074	2009 HX_{106}	—	April 24, 2009	Mount Lemmon	Mount Lemmon Survey	·	1.3 km	MPC · JPL
316075	2009 JD_{7}	—	May 13, 2009	Mount Lemmon	Mount Lemmon Survey	V	960 m	MPC · JPL
316076	2009 JC_{11}	—	May 14, 2009	Kitt Peak	Spacewatch	·	1.4 km	MPC · JPL
316077	2009 JO_{12}	—	May 15, 2009	La Sagra	OAM	·	2.0 km	MPC · JPL
316078	2009 JZ_{13}	—	May 2, 2009	Cerro Burek	Burek, Cerro	·	1.2 km	MPC · JPL
316079	2009 JV_{16}	—	May 14, 2009	Kitt Peak	Spacewatch	NYS	1.2 km	MPC · JPL
316080 Boni	2009 KD	Boni	May 16, 2009	Vicques	M. Ory	V	850 m	MPC · JPL
316081	2009 KY	—	May 16, 2009	Dauban	Kugel, F.	·	880 m	MPC · JPL
316082	2009 KB_{3}	—	May 20, 2009	Mayhill	Lowe, A.	·	2.7 km	MPC · JPL
316083	2009 KZ_{3}	—	May 24, 2009	Catalina	CSS	NYS	1.3 km	MPC · JPL
316084 Mykolapokropyvny	2009 KT_{8}	Mykolapokropyvny	May 26, 2009	Andrushivka	Andrushivka	JUN	1.4 km	MPC · JPL
316085	2009 KT_{9}	—	May 25, 2009	Kitt Peak	Spacewatch	L5	10 km	MPC · JPL
316086	2009 KU_{9}	—	May 25, 2009	Kitt Peak	Spacewatch	·	1.6 km	MPC · JPL
316087	2009 KB_{13}	—	May 25, 2009	Kitt Peak	Spacewatch	MAS	800 m	MPC · JPL
316088	2009 KH_{13}	—	May 25, 2009	Kitt Peak	Spacewatch	V	710 m	MPC · JPL
316089	2009 KH_{15}	—	May 26, 2009	Catalina	CSS	·	1.2 km	MPC · JPL
316090	2009 KW_{28}	—	May 31, 2009	Catalina	CSS	·	1.5 km	MPC · JPL
316091	2009 KC_{29}	—	May 27, 2009	Mount Lemmon	Mount Lemmon Survey	·	1.3 km	MPC · JPL
316092	2009 KT_{30}	—	May 20, 2009	Sierra Stars	R. Matson	·	930 m	MPC · JPL
316093	2009 LB_{1}	—	June 12, 2009	Catalina	CSS	·	1.4 km	MPC · JPL
316094	2009 LA_{7}	—	June 15, 2009	Mount Lemmon	Mount Lemmon Survey	·	2.9 km	MPC · JPL
316095	2009 MX_{4}	—	January 16, 2008	Kitt Peak	Spacewatch	·	1.9 km	MPC · JPL
316096	2009 NQ_{1}	—	June 14, 2009	Kitt Peak	Spacewatch	LIX	4.4 km	MPC · JPL
316097	2009 OW	—	July 18, 2009	Tiki	Teamo, N.	HYG	3.8 km	MPC · JPL
316098	2009 OO_{1}	—	July 19, 2009	Vallemare Borbona	V. S. Casulli	·	4.0 km	MPC · JPL
316099	2009 OU_{3}	—	July 16, 2009	La Sagra	OAM	·	4.3 km	MPC · JPL
316100	2009 OG_{5}	—	July 25, 2009	La Sagra	OAM	·	6.1 km	MPC · JPL

== 316101–316200 ==
back to top

Designation			Discovery			Properties		Ref
Permanent	Provisional	Named after	Date	Site	Discoverer(s)	Category	Diam.	Ref
316101	2009 OP_{13}	—	July 27, 2009	Kitt Peak	Spacewatch	·	2.5 km	MPC · JPL
316102	2009 OE_{14}	—	July 14, 2009	Kitt Peak	Spacewatch	·	4.2 km	MPC · JPL
316103	2009 OQ_{17}	—	July 28, 2009	Kitt Peak	Spacewatch	HYG	3.2 km	MPC · JPL
316104	2009 OP_{18}	—	June 23, 2009	Mount Lemmon	Mount Lemmon Survey	GEF	1.7 km	MPC · JPL
316105	2009 OV_{24}	—	July 31, 2009	Catalina	CSS	·	5.1 km	MPC · JPL
316106	2009 PM	—	August 12, 2009	Sandlot	G. Hug	·	820 m	MPC · JPL
316107	2009 PM_{3}	—	December 10, 2005	Kitt Peak	Spacewatch	EOS	2.4 km	MPC · JPL
316108	2009 PO_{4}	—	August 14, 2009	La Sagra	OAM	DOR	3.0 km	MPC · JPL
316109	2009 PL_{5}	—	August 15, 2009	La Sagra	OAM	·	3.7 km	MPC · JPL
316110	2009 PF_{9}	—	August 15, 2009	Kitt Peak	Spacewatch	THM	3.0 km	MPC · JPL
316111	2009 PY_{10}	—	August 15, 2009	Socorro	LINEAR	·	5.7 km	MPC · JPL
316112	2009 PA_{15}	—	August 15, 2009	Catalina	CSS	·	2.1 km	MPC · JPL
316113	2009 PV_{16}	—	August 15, 2009	Catalina	CSS	EOS	2.3 km	MPC · JPL
316114	2009 QY_{5}	—	August 18, 2009	Calvin-Rehoboth	L. A. Molnar	TIR	4.5 km	MPC · JPL
316115	2009 QL_{13}	—	August 16, 2009	Kitt Peak	Spacewatch	·	2.5 km	MPC · JPL
316116	2009 QN_{13}	—	August 16, 2009	Kitt Peak	Spacewatch	·	3.3 km	MPC · JPL
316117	2009 QT_{21}	—	August 20, 2009	La Sagra	OAM	BRA	1.9 km	MPC · JPL
316118	2009 QY_{22}	—	August 20, 2009	La Sagra	OAM	·	3.9 km	MPC · JPL
316119	2009 QL_{26}	—	August 20, 2009	Magasa	Osservatorio Cima Rest	L4	11 km	MPC · JPL
316120	2009 QM_{26}	—	August 21, 2009	Sandlot	G. Hug	·	2.1 km	MPC · JPL
316121	2009 QN_{27}	—	July 28, 2009	Kitt Peak	Spacewatch	VER	3.6 km	MPC · JPL
316122	2009 QP_{31}	—	August 21, 2009	La Sagra	OAM	·	2.9 km	MPC · JPL
316123	2009 QT_{35}	—	August 25, 2009	Sandlot	G. Hug	·	4.6 km	MPC · JPL
316124	2009 QH_{47}	—	August 28, 2009	La Sagra	OAM	EOS	3.0 km	MPC · JPL
316125	2009 QB_{54}	—	August 19, 2009	Kitt Peak	Spacewatch	·	2.8 km	MPC · JPL
316126	2009 RG_{30}	—	September 14, 2009	Catalina	CSS	GAL	2.1 km	MPC · JPL
316127	2009 RY_{34}	—	September 14, 2009	Kitt Peak	Spacewatch	L4	7.4 km	MPC · JPL
316128	2009 RB_{57}	—	December 16, 1999	Kitt Peak	Spacewatch	L4	8.8 km	MPC · JPL
316129	2009 RH_{64}	—	September 15, 2009	Kitt Peak	Spacewatch	L4	8.2 km	MPC · JPL
316130	2009 RA_{74}	—	September 15, 2009	Kitt Peak	Spacewatch	L4 · ERY	10 km	MPC · JPL
316131	2009 SW_{15}	—	September 19, 2009	Bisei SG Center	BATTeRS	·	3.9 km	MPC · JPL
316132	2009 SO_{19}	—	September 22, 2009	Taunus	Karge, S., R. Kling	L4	8.3 km	MPC · JPL
316133	2009 SX_{33}	—	October 25, 1997	Caussols	ODAS	L4	9.8 km	MPC · JPL
316134	2009 SV_{43}	—	September 16, 2009	Kitt Peak	Spacewatch	L4	9.0 km	MPC · JPL
316135	2009 SX_{65}	—	September 17, 2009	Kitt Peak	Spacewatch	L4	7.8 km	MPC · JPL
316136	2009 SC_{99}	—	December 10, 2005	Kitt Peak	Spacewatch	·	3.3 km	MPC · JPL
316137	2009 SM_{131}	—	September 18, 2009	Kitt Peak	Spacewatch	L4	8.4 km	MPC · JPL
316138 Giorgione	2009 SL_{170}	Giorgione	September 26, 2009	Saint-Sulpice	B. Christophe	·	3.6 km	MPC · JPL
316139	2009 SH_{237}	—	April 15, 2007	Mount Lemmon	Mount Lemmon Survey	EOS	3.1 km	MPC · JPL
316140	2009 SY_{239}	—	September 17, 2009	Catalina	CSS	·	4.1 km	MPC · JPL
316141	2009 SM_{248}	—	September 16, 2009	Kitt Peak	Spacewatch	L4	12 km	MPC · JPL
316142	2009 SL_{280}	—	September 25, 2009	Kitt Peak	Spacewatch	·	3.4 km	MPC · JPL
316143	2009 SL_{287}	—	September 25, 2009	Kitt Peak	Spacewatch	·	4.6 km	MPC · JPL
316144	2009 SD_{304}	—	September 16, 2009	Kitt Peak	Spacewatch	L4	10 km	MPC · JPL
316145	2009 SC_{330}	—	March 25, 2007	Mount Lemmon	Mount Lemmon Survey	T_{j} (2.94) · 3:2	8.2 km	MPC · JPL
316146	2009 SV_{347}	—	September 16, 2009	Kitt Peak	Spacewatch	L4	8.6 km	MPC · JPL
316147	2009 SM_{348}	—	September 16, 2009	Mount Lemmon	Mount Lemmon Survey	L4	11 km	MPC · JPL
316148	2009 SK_{352}	—	September 22, 2009	Mount Lemmon	Mount Lemmon Survey	L4	8.4 km	MPC · JPL
316149	2009 ST_{355}	—	September 25, 2009	Kitt Peak	Spacewatch	L4	10 km	MPC · JPL
316150	2009 SW_{355}	—	September 29, 2009	Mount Lemmon	Mount Lemmon Survey	L4	9.2 km	MPC · JPL
316151	2009 SJ_{356}	—	September 16, 2009	Kitt Peak	Spacewatch	·	3.5 km	MPC · JPL
316152	2009 SV_{361}	—	September 30, 2009	Mount Lemmon	Mount Lemmon Survey	L4	11 km	MPC · JPL
316153	2009 TZ_{24}	—	October 14, 2009	Catalina	CSS	L4	10 km	MPC · JPL
316154	2009 TP_{39}	—	October 14, 2009	La Sagra	OAM	EOS	2.5 km	MPC · JPL
316155	2009 TW_{41}	—	October 15, 2009	La Sagra	OAM	L4	10 km	MPC · JPL
316156	2009 UW_{4}	—	October 18, 2009	Bisei SG Center	BATTeRS	L4	9.9 km	MPC · JPL
316157	2009 UT_{13}	—	October 18, 2009	Kitt Peak	Spacewatch	L4	8.5 km	MPC · JPL
316158	2009 UW_{26}	—	October 21, 2009	Catalina	CSS	L4	17 km	MPC · JPL
316159	2009 UH_{29}	—	October 18, 2009	Mount Lemmon	Mount Lemmon Survey	L4	8.2 km	MPC · JPL
316160	2009 UW_{51}	—	August 24, 2008	Kitt Peak	Spacewatch	L4	8.5 km	MPC · JPL
316161	2009 UT_{76}	—	April 25, 2003	Kitt Peak	Spacewatch	L4	11 km	MPC · JPL
316162	2009 UE_{108}	—	October 23, 2009	Kitt Peak	Spacewatch	L4	9.9 km	MPC · JPL
316163	2009 VE_{46}	—	November 9, 2009	Kitt Peak	Spacewatch	L4	7.8 km	MPC · JPL
316164	2009 VM_{71}	—	November 10, 2009	Kitt Peak	Spacewatch	L4	7.3 km	MPC · JPL
316165	2009 VP_{110}	—	December 12, 1999	Kitt Peak	Spacewatch	L4	14 km	MPC · JPL
316166	2009 WQ_{1}	—	November 16, 2009	Kitt Peak	Spacewatch	L4	7.9 km	MPC · JPL
316167	2009 WM_{29}	—	November 16, 2009	Mount Lemmon	Mount Lemmon Survey	·	4.1 km	MPC · JPL
316168	2009 WA_{57}	—	November 16, 2009	Mount Lemmon	Mount Lemmon Survey	L4	8.1 km	MPC · JPL
316169	2009 WQ_{96}	—	September 22, 2008	Kitt Peak	Spacewatch	L4	8.0 km	MPC · JPL
316170	2009 WV_{149}	—	November 19, 2009	Mount Lemmon	Mount Lemmon Survey	L4	15 km	MPC · JPL
316171	2009 WV_{197}	—	August 5, 2008	Siding Spring	SSS	·	4.4 km	MPC · JPL
316172	2009 WJ_{218}	—	November 20, 2009	La Silla	La Silla	·	4.1 km	MPC · JPL
316173	2009 WB_{240}	—	November 17, 2009	Catalina	CSS	L4	11 km	MPC · JPL
316174	2009 WM_{250}	—	November 23, 2009	Mount Lemmon	Mount Lemmon Survey	L4 · (222861)	10 km	MPC · JPL
316175	2010 BM_{33}	—	February 13, 2002	Kitt Peak	Spacewatch	L4	14 km	MPC · JPL
316176	2010 BB_{46}	—	July 15, 2004	Cerro Tololo	Deep Ecliptic Survey	L4	10 km	MPC · JPL
316177	2010 BW_{70}	—	May 14, 2004	Kitt Peak	Spacewatch	L4	15 km	MPC · JPL
316178	2010 CX_{159}	—	February 15, 2010	Kitt Peak	Spacewatch	·	1.6 km	MPC · JPL
316179	2010 EN_{65}	—	March 7, 2010	La Silla	D. L. Rabinowitz, S. Tourtellotte	centaur	204 km	MPC · JPL
316180	2010 GN_{76}	—	April 10, 2010	WISE	WISE	·	2.3 km	MPC · JPL
316181	2010 GY_{126}	—	April 10, 2010	Kitt Peak	Spacewatch	H	660 m	MPC · JPL
316182	2010 GP_{150}	—	October 23, 2003	Apache Point	SDSS	·	1.6 km	MPC · JPL
316183	2010 HB_{39}	—	April 21, 2010	WISE	WISE	·	1.3 km	MPC · JPL
316184	2010 JS_{126}	—	May 13, 2010	WISE	WISE	GEF	1.0 km	MPC · JPL
316185	2010 JN_{129}	—	May 13, 2010	WISE	WISE	·	1.8 km	MPC · JPL
316186 Kathrynjoyce	2010 KJ_{41}	Kathrynjoyce	May 19, 2010	WISE	WISE	·	2.9 km	MPC · JPL
316187	2010 KD_{47}	—	May 21, 2010	WISE	WISE	·	4.5 km	MPC · JPL
316188	2010 KH_{62}	—	June 18, 2006	Palomar	NEAT	·	2.3 km	MPC · JPL
316189	2010 KY_{74}	—	December 27, 2006	Mount Lemmon	Mount Lemmon Survey	VER	3.1 km	MPC · JPL
316190	2010 KE_{129}	—	May 10, 2005	Mount Lemmon	Mount Lemmon Survey	·	2.0 km	MPC · JPL
316191	2010 LK_{12}	—	May 1, 2009	Mount Lemmon	Mount Lemmon Survey	NAE	3.8 km	MPC · JPL
316192	2010 LO_{53}	—	June 8, 2010	WISE	WISE	·	1.8 km	MPC · JPL
316193	2010 LJ_{71}	—	June 10, 2010	WISE	WISE	·	1.9 km	MPC · JPL
316194	2010 LZ_{80}	—	June 11, 2010	WISE	WISE	NYS ·	1.4 km	MPC · JPL
316195	2010 LN_{100}	—	June 13, 2010	WISE	WISE	·	2.8 km	MPC · JPL
316196	2010 LF_{119}	—	June 14, 2010	WISE	WISE	·	3.7 km	MPC · JPL
316197	2010 ME_{10}	—	September 17, 2006	Catalina	CSS	(194)	1.6 km	MPC · JPL
316198	2010 MP_{33}	—	June 21, 2010	WISE	WISE	·	3.0 km	MPC · JPL
316199	2010 MA_{37}	—	June 21, 2010	WISE	WISE	·	2.3 km	MPC · JPL
316200	2010 MT_{41}	—	August 22, 2004	Kitt Peak	Spacewatch	·	4.3 km	MPC · JPL

== 316201–316300 ==
back to top

Designation			Discovery			Properties		Ref
Permanent	Provisional	Named after	Date	Site	Discoverer(s)	Category	Diam.	Ref
316201 Malala	2010 ML_{48}	Malala	June 23, 2010	WISE	WISE	·	4.1 km	MPC · JPL
316202 Johnfowler	2010 MX_{54}	Johnfowler	June 16, 2010	WISE	WISE	HOF	2.5 km	MPC · JPL
316203	2010 MV_{56}	—	February 27, 2008	Kitt Peak	Spacewatch	·	4.0 km	MPC · JPL
316204	2010 ML_{61}	—	June 24, 2010	WISE	WISE	·	2.9 km	MPC · JPL
316205	2010 MK_{69}	—	October 23, 2001	Palomar	NEAT	·	3.8 km	MPC · JPL
316206	2010 MU_{74}	—	June 26, 2010	WISE	WISE	T_{j} (2.98) · HIL · 3:2	5.2 km	MPC · JPL
316207	2010 MR_{80}	—	October 10, 2005	Catalina	CSS	·	3.7 km	MPC · JPL
316208	2010 MT_{81}	—	April 7, 2008	Kitt Peak	Spacewatch	HYG	2.9 km	MPC · JPL
316209	2010 MD_{94}	—	June 28, 2010	WISE	WISE	·	2.6 km	MPC · JPL
316210	2010 MJ_{95}	—	January 11, 2008	Mount Lemmon	Mount Lemmon Survey	ADE	3.5 km	MPC · JPL
316211	2010 MB_{99}	—	February 12, 2004	Palomar	NEAT	·	2.1 km	MPC · JPL
316212	2010 MG_{103}	—	July 28, 2005	Palomar	NEAT	HOF	2.5 km	MPC · JPL
316213	2010 NB_{5}	—	July 6, 2010	Mount Lemmon	Mount Lemmon Survey	·	1.3 km	MPC · JPL
316214	2010 NU_{6}	—	September 19, 2006	Catalina	CSS	·	1.8 km	MPC · JPL
316215	2010 NV_{13}	—	July 5, 2010	WISE	WISE	·	4.4 km	MPC · JPL
316216	2010 NE_{17}	—	March 9, 2005	Kitt Peak	Spacewatch	CLA	1.6 km	MPC · JPL
316217	2010 NV_{23}	—	September 23, 2005	Kitt Peak	Spacewatch	·	3.0 km	MPC · JPL
316218	2010 NF_{27}	—	March 9, 2007	Kitt Peak	Spacewatch	·	4.0 km	MPC · JPL
316219	2010 NJ_{34}	—	July 8, 2010	WISE	WISE	·	2.6 km	MPC · JPL
316220	2010 NQ_{38}	—	March 11, 2008	Kitt Peak	Spacewatch	·	4.0 km	MPC · JPL
316221	2010 NX_{38}	—	July 4, 2005	Palomar	NEAT	·	2.9 km	MPC · JPL
316222	2010 NG_{44}	—	July 9, 2010	WISE	WISE	·	4.2 km	MPC · JPL
316223	2010 NL_{56}	—	August 8, 2004	Anderson Mesa	LONEOS	·	4.4 km	MPC · JPL
316224	2010 NO_{57}	—	September 25, 2005	Kitt Peak	Spacewatch	·	2.7 km	MPC · JPL
316225	2010 NG_{67}	—	October 3, 2006	Mount Lemmon	Mount Lemmon Survey	·	2.6 km	MPC · JPL
316226	2010 NJ_{75}	—	August 8, 2004	Palomar	NEAT	TIR	2.0 km	MPC · JPL
316227	2010 NF_{82}	—	December 30, 2007	Kitt Peak	Spacewatch	·	3.8 km	MPC · JPL
316228	2010 NX_{106}	—	July 12, 2010	WISE	WISE	·	3.6 km	MPC · JPL
316229	2010 NL_{110}	—	December 21, 2006	Mount Lemmon	Mount Lemmon Survey	EOS	2.7 km	MPC · JPL
316230	2010 NF_{112}	—	July 13, 2010	WISE	WISE	·	4.4 km	MPC · JPL
316231	2010 NY_{114}	—	July 14, 2010	WISE	WISE	AST	1.7 km	MPC · JPL
316232	2010 OT_{4}	—	July 16, 2010	WISE	WISE	NEM	2.9 km	MPC · JPL
316233	2010 OV_{4}	—	October 22, 2005	Kitt Peak	Spacewatch	·	3.9 km	MPC · JPL
316234	2010 OQ_{13}	—	September 13, 2004	Kitt Peak	Spacewatch	·	2.6 km	MPC · JPL
316235	2010 OU_{19}	—	December 15, 2006	Kitt Peak	Spacewatch	·	4.1 km	MPC · JPL
316236	2010 OB_{20}	—	August 1, 2005	Siding Spring	SSS	·	2.3 km	MPC · JPL
316237	2010 OX_{21}	—	August 7, 2004	Palomar	NEAT	·	3.7 km	MPC · JPL
316238	2010 OY_{22}	—	March 26, 2003	Kitt Peak	Spacewatch	·	4.1 km	MPC · JPL
316239	2010 OP_{25}	—	March 14, 2007	Kitt Peak	Spacewatch	·	3.3 km	MPC · JPL
316240	2010 OZ_{27}	—	July 19, 2010	WISE	WISE	·	5.4 km	MPC · JPL
316241	2010 OX_{28}	—	July 19, 2010	WISE	WISE	·	1.7 km	MPC · JPL
316242	2010 OA_{31}	—	December 4, 2005	Catalina	CSS	·	2.7 km	MPC · JPL
316243	2010 OG_{31}	—	December 1, 2005	Kitt Peak	Spacewatch	·	4.0 km	MPC · JPL
316244	2010 OL_{32}	—	April 14, 2004	Kitt Peak	Spacewatch	·	4.2 km	MPC · JPL
316245	2010 OS_{39}	—	December 27, 2000	Kitt Peak	Spacewatch	·	5.0 km	MPC · JPL
316246	2010 OZ_{40}	—	September 15, 2004	Kitt Peak	Spacewatch	URS	6.0 km	MPC · JPL
316247	2010 OF_{42}	—	February 11, 2002	Socorro	LINEAR	EOS	2.7 km	MPC · JPL
316248	2010 OK_{50}	—	January 5, 2003	Kitt Peak	Spacewatch	·	3.2 km	MPC · JPL
316249	2010 OL_{55}	—	September 8, 1999	Socorro	LINEAR	slow	1.8 km	MPC · JPL
316250	2010 ON_{65}	—	February 19, 2001	Kitt Peak	Spacewatch	·	5.8 km	MPC · JPL
316251	2010 OV_{66}	—	March 31, 2008	Mount Lemmon	Mount Lemmon Survey	·	4.6 km	MPC · JPL
316252	2010 OA_{70}	—	November 22, 2006	Kitt Peak	Spacewatch	·	3.0 km	MPC · JPL
316253	2010 OA_{72}	—	September 26, 1992	Kitt Peak	Spacewatch	·	5.7 km	MPC · JPL
316254	2010 OE_{86}	—	November 20, 2006	Mount Lemmon	Mount Lemmon Survey	·	2.8 km	MPC · JPL
316255	2010 OG_{88}	—	July 27, 2010	WISE	WISE	EUN	2.2 km	MPC · JPL
316256	2010 OF_{89}	—	January 19, 1996	Kitt Peak	Spacewatch	EOS	2.8 km	MPC · JPL
316257	2010 OH_{97}	—	March 12, 2003	Kitt Peak	Spacewatch	PAD	3.1 km	MPC · JPL
316258	2010 OE_{100}	—	July 20, 2010	Shenton Park	Luckas, P.	·	2.0 km	MPC · JPL
316259	2010 OH_{100}	—	July 21, 2010	Bisei SG Center	BATTeRS	·	790 m	MPC · JPL
316260	2010 OQ_{107}	—	October 13, 1999	Apache Point	SDSS	EMA	3.8 km	MPC · JPL
316261	2010 ON_{113}	—	December 27, 2006	Mount Lemmon	Mount Lemmon Survey	·	2.9 km	MPC · JPL
316262	2010 OP_{116}	—	November 27, 2006	Kitt Peak	Spacewatch	·	4.2 km	MPC · JPL
316263	2010 OT_{121}	—	July 31, 2010	WISE	WISE	·	1.4 km	MPC · JPL
316264	2010 PV_{8}	—	August 3, 2010	Socorro	LINEAR	·	1.1 km	MPC · JPL
316265	2010 PT_{9}	—	August 4, 2010	Socorro	LINEAR	·	1.9 km	MPC · JPL
316266	2010 PE_{22}	—	September 10, 2004	Socorro	LINEAR	·	3.9 km	MPC · JPL
316267	2010 PW_{25}	—	August 8, 2010	WISE	WISE	L4 · ERY	10 km	MPC · JPL
316268	2010 PJ_{26}	—	August 7, 2010	La Sagra	OAM	·	1.8 km	MPC · JPL
316269	2010 PG_{30}	—	October 4, 1999	Kitt Peak	Spacewatch	·	2.6 km	MPC · JPL
316270	2010 PV_{33}	—	June 17, 2005	Mount Lemmon	Mount Lemmon Survey	NEM	2.0 km	MPC · JPL
316271	2010 PA_{35}	—	February 21, 2007	Mount Lemmon	Mount Lemmon Survey	·	4.1 km	MPC · JPL
316272	2010 PY_{39}	—	April 3, 2008	Kitt Peak	Spacewatch	·	4.6 km	MPC · JPL
316273	2010 PL_{42}	—	January 4, 2001	Socorro	LINEAR	·	4.6 km	MPC · JPL
316274	2010 PH_{49}	—	November 10, 1999	Kitt Peak	Spacewatch	·	5.3 km	MPC · JPL
316275	2010 PP_{50}	—	April 6, 2008	Mount Lemmon	Mount Lemmon Survey	·	3.3 km	MPC · JPL
316276	2010 PL_{51}	—	September 9, 2004	Socorro	LINEAR	·	4.9 km	MPC · JPL
316277	2010 PW_{52}	—	February 13, 2004	Kitt Peak	Spacewatch	·	3.5 km	MPC · JPL
316278	2010 PD_{55}	—	July 1, 2005	Kitt Peak	Spacewatch	·	2.6 km	MPC · JPL
316279	2010 PZ_{57}	—	August 9, 2010	Purple Mountain	PMO NEO Survey Program	·	2.1 km	MPC · JPL
316280	2010 PO_{61}	—	August 10, 2010	Kitt Peak	Spacewatch	MAS	950 m	MPC · JPL
316281	2010 PR_{64}	—	August 10, 2010	Kitt Peak	Spacewatch	V	780 m	MPC · JPL
316282	2010 PC_{65}	—	August 10, 2010	Kitt Peak	Spacewatch	·	1.4 km	MPC · JPL
316283	2010 PG_{72}	—	July 22, 2001	Palomar	NEAT	ADE	3.2 km	MPC · JPL
316284	2010 PY_{76}	—	August 11, 2010	La Sagra	OAM	·	930 m	MPC · JPL
316285	2010 PB_{80}	—	August 13, 2010	Kitt Peak	Spacewatch	·	1.1 km	MPC · JPL
316286	2010 QK_{5}	—	March 31, 2009	Mount Lemmon	Mount Lemmon Survey	PHO	1.4 km	MPC · JPL
316287	2010 RG_{2}	—	September 1, 2010	Socorro	LINEAR	·	1.3 km	MPC · JPL
316288	2010 RC_{3}	—	September 1, 2010	Socorro	LINEAR	MAS	1.0 km	MPC · JPL
316289	2010 RM_{4}	—	March 8, 2005	Mount Lemmon	Mount Lemmon Survey	·	1.4 km	MPC · JPL
316290	2010 RD_{9}	—	September 1, 2010	Socorro	LINEAR	·	1.7 km	MPC · JPL
316291	2010 RJ_{10}	—	September 2, 2010	Mount Lemmon	Mount Lemmon Survey	·	1.9 km	MPC · JPL
316292	2010 RJ_{20}	—	September 3, 2010	Mount Lemmon	Mount Lemmon Survey	615	1.7 km	MPC · JPL
316293	2010 RZ_{36}	—	September 2, 2010	Mount Lemmon	Mount Lemmon Survey	(16286)	2.5 km	MPC · JPL
316294	2010 RD_{38}	—	September 5, 2010	La Sagra	OAM	·	2.1 km	MPC · JPL
316295	2010 RD_{40}	—	September 4, 2010	La Sagra	OAM	TIR	3.6 km	MPC · JPL
316296	2010 RH_{40}	—	October 3, 2000	Socorro	LINEAR	·	1.1 km	MPC · JPL
316297	2010 RB_{48}	—	August 30, 2005	Kitt Peak	Spacewatch	·	1.9 km	MPC · JPL
316298	2010 RV_{51}	—	September 9, 2004	Apache Point	SDSS Collaboration	THM	2.2 km	MPC · JPL
316299	2010 RP_{56}	—	October 2, 2006	Kitt Peak	Spacewatch	·	1.4 km	MPC · JPL
316300	2010 RX_{59}	—	September 26, 2006	Kitt Peak	Spacewatch	·	1.1 km	MPC · JPL

== 316301–316400 ==
back to top

Designation			Discovery			Properties		Ref
Permanent	Provisional	Named after	Date	Site	Discoverer(s)	Category	Diam.	Ref
316301	2010 RY_{59}	—	August 28, 2005	Kitt Peak	Spacewatch	·	1.7 km	MPC · JPL
316302	2010 RY_{61}	—	October 3, 1999	Kitt Peak	Spacewatch	EOS	2.1 km	MPC · JPL
316303	2010 RV_{62}	—	September 3, 2010	Mount Lemmon	Mount Lemmon Survey	·	760 m	MPC · JPL
316304	2010 RY_{63}	—	September 9, 2010	Kitt Peak	Spacewatch	·	1.4 km	MPC · JPL
316305	2010 RR_{65}	—	September 4, 2010	Socorro	LINEAR	·	1.8 km	MPC · JPL
316306	2010 RG_{66}	—	March 9, 2005	Mount Lemmon	Mount Lemmon Survey	·	1.3 km	MPC · JPL
316307	2010 RD_{67}	—	September 5, 2010	Dauban	Kugel, F.	·	2.2 km	MPC · JPL
316308	2010 RH_{67}	—	December 10, 2004	Kitt Peak	Spacewatch	·	1.0 km	MPC · JPL
316309	2010 RU_{68}	—	November 18, 2003	Kitt Peak	Spacewatch	·	1.7 km	MPC · JPL
316310	2010 RX_{68}	—	March 6, 2008	Mount Lemmon	Mount Lemmon Survey	GEF	1.3 km	MPC · JPL
316311	2010 RE_{69}	—	November 22, 2006	Kitt Peak	Spacewatch	·	2.1 km	MPC · JPL
316312	2010 RH_{78}	—	April 21, 2004	Kitt Peak	Spacewatch	GEF	1.3 km	MPC · JPL
316313	2010 RH_{90}	—	February 28, 2000	Kitt Peak	Spacewatch	·	2.0 km	MPC · JPL
316314	2010 RK_{90}	—	October 22, 2006	Mount Lemmon	Mount Lemmon Survey	·	2.5 km	MPC · JPL
316315	2010 RO_{98}	—	September 10, 2010	Kitt Peak	Spacewatch	·	1.3 km	MPC · JPL
316316	2010 RS_{98}	—	February 9, 2008	Kitt Peak	Spacewatch	·	1.5 km	MPC · JPL
316317	2010 RF_{101}	—	February 2, 2005	Kitt Peak	Spacewatch	·	1.5 km	MPC · JPL
316318	2010 RO_{101}	—	September 10, 2010	Kitt Peak	Spacewatch	·	1.7 km	MPC · JPL
316319	2010 RV_{101}	—	November 23, 2003	Kitt Peak	Spacewatch	·	1.7 km	MPC · JPL
316320	2010 RE_{103}	—	September 28, 2003	Kitt Peak	Spacewatch	·	1.1 km	MPC · JPL
316321	2010 RG_{104}	—	October 11, 1999	Kitt Peak	Spacewatch	CLA	1.8 km	MPC · JPL
316322	2010 RL_{108}	—	May 24, 2006	Mount Lemmon	Mount Lemmon Survey	·	1.1 km	MPC · JPL
316323	2010 RW_{108}	—	April 8, 2002	Palomar	NEAT	·	1.2 km	MPC · JPL
316324	2010 RS_{109}	—	September 13, 2010	Kachina	Hobart, J.	526	2.9 km	MPC · JPL
316325	2010 RT_{110}	—	September 18, 2001	Kitt Peak	Spacewatch	·	1.5 km	MPC · JPL
316326	2010 RB_{112}	—	October 18, 2001	Palomar	NEAT	·	1.7 km	MPC · JPL
316327	2010 RJ_{112}	—	September 11, 2010	Kitt Peak	Spacewatch	·	2.2 km	MPC · JPL
316328	2010 RW_{114}	—	September 7, 1999	Kitt Peak	Spacewatch	V	660 m	MPC · JPL
316329	2010 RB_{115}	—	May 13, 2004	Kitt Peak	Spacewatch	·	1.9 km	MPC · JPL
316330	2010 RM_{116}	—	September 18, 2003	Anderson Mesa	LONEOS	·	870 m	MPC · JPL
316331	2010 RB_{119}	—	October 21, 2001	Socorro	LINEAR	·	2.9 km	MPC · JPL
316332	2010 RG_{123}	—	September 18, 2001	Kitt Peak	Spacewatch	·	2.0 km	MPC · JPL
316333	2010 RP_{123}	—	September 19, 2001	Ondřejov	Ondřejov, Observatoř	·	2.1 km	MPC · JPL
316334	2010 RS_{124}	—	October 11, 2001	Kitt Peak	Spacewatch	·	1.8 km	MPC · JPL
316335	2010 RP_{125}	—	October 12, 1999	Kitt Peak	Spacewatch	HYG	2.9 km	MPC · JPL
316336	2010 RZ_{125}	—	February 9, 2005	Anderson Mesa	LONEOS	·	1.1 km	MPC · JPL
316337	2010 RM_{126}	—	November 2, 2007	Mount Lemmon	Mount Lemmon Survey	·	790 m	MPC · JPL
316338	2010 RU_{126}	—	April 29, 2003	Kitt Peak	Spacewatch	·	2.5 km	MPC · JPL
316339	2010 RZ_{128}	—	October 27, 2005	Kitt Peak	Spacewatch	(1298)	2.8 km	MPC · JPL
316340	2010 RA_{129}	—	July 30, 2005	Palomar	NEAT	·	2.8 km	MPC · JPL
316341	2010 RG_{136}	—	September 30, 2006	Mount Lemmon	Mount Lemmon Survey	·	1.6 km	MPC · JPL
316342	2010 RH_{141}	—	October 13, 1999	Apache Point	SDSS	·	1.4 km	MPC · JPL
316343	2010 RL_{143}	—	November 15, 2006	Kitt Peak	Spacewatch	·	1.5 km	MPC · JPL
316344	2010 RH_{146}	—	September 19, 2001	Kitt Peak	Spacewatch	·	1.5 km	MPC · JPL
316345	2010 RZ_{146}	—	September 17, 2006	Kitt Peak	Spacewatch	·	1.3 km	MPC · JPL
316346	2010 RR_{147}	—	August 29, 2005	Kitt Peak	Spacewatch	AGN	1.6 km	MPC · JPL
316347	2010 RE_{151}	—	August 18, 2006	Kitt Peak	Spacewatch	·	1.4 km	MPC · JPL
316348	2010 RF_{151}	—	September 15, 2010	Kitt Peak	Spacewatch	·	1.7 km	MPC · JPL
316349	2010 RW_{152}	—	February 18, 2008	Mount Lemmon	Mount Lemmon Survey	·	2.2 km	MPC · JPL
316350	2010 RG_{156}	—	February 9, 2008	Mount Lemmon	Mount Lemmon Survey	·	1.7 km	MPC · JPL
316351	2010 RV_{160}	—	September 4, 1999	Catalina	CSS	·	3.8 km	MPC · JPL
316352	2010 RJ_{164}	—	October 12, 2002	Socorro	LINEAR	·	1.4 km	MPC · JPL
316353	2010 RZ_{164}	—	September 30, 1999	Catalina	CSS	TIR	3.0 km	MPC · JPL
316354	2010 RZ_{169}	—	December 17, 2001	Socorro	LINEAR	KOR	1.4 km	MPC · JPL
316355	2010 RD_{174}	—	December 14, 2003	Kitt Peak	Spacewatch	·	1.3 km	MPC · JPL
316356	2010 RH_{175}	—	February 28, 2008	Kitt Peak	Spacewatch	·	2.0 km	MPC · JPL
316357	2010 RW_{175}	—	October 15, 2001	Kitt Peak	Spacewatch	·	2.0 km	MPC · JPL
316358	2010 RZ_{176}	—	September 30, 2003	Kitt Peak	Spacewatch	·	1.6 km	MPC · JPL
316359	2010 RV_{177}	—	September 29, 2005	Kitt Peak	Spacewatch	·	1.8 km	MPC · JPL
316360	2010 RO_{180}	—	September 28, 2000	Socorro	LINEAR	·	1.0 km	MPC · JPL
316361	2010 SM_{2}	—	July 29, 2000	Prescott	P. G. Comba	·	2.1 km	MPC · JPL
316362	2010 SB_{11}	—	October 18, 1995	Kitt Peak	Spacewatch	·	1.2 km	MPC · JPL
316363	2010 SU_{18}	—	July 4, 2005	Mount Lemmon	Mount Lemmon Survey	(12739)	2.1 km	MPC · JPL
316364	2010 SJ_{19}	—	August 29, 2005	Kitt Peak	Spacewatch	KOR	1.5 km	MPC · JPL
316365	2010 SD_{20}	—	January 17, 2004	Palomar	NEAT	·	1.3 km	MPC · JPL
316366	2010 SX_{21}	—	October 13, 1999	Socorro	LINEAR	·	3.7 km	MPC · JPL
316367	2010 SP_{27}	—	March 13, 2007	Mount Lemmon	Mount Lemmon Survey	·	2.6 km	MPC · JPL
316368	2010 SQ_{27}	—	September 24, 2005	Kitt Peak	Spacewatch	KOR	1.3 km	MPC · JPL
316369	2010 SU_{27}	—	September 18, 1999	Kitt Peak	Spacewatch	·	2.7 km	MPC · JPL
316370	2010 SZ_{30}	—	August 6, 2005	Palomar	NEAT	BRA	1.8 km	MPC · JPL
316371	2010 SL_{32}	—	March 12, 2007	Mount Lemmon	Mount Lemmon Survey	HYG	3.2 km	MPC · JPL
316372	2010 SJ_{36}	—	September 19, 2010	Kitt Peak	Spacewatch	·	2.0 km	MPC · JPL
316373	2010 SL_{37}	—	October 23, 2006	Catalina	CSS	·	2.1 km	MPC · JPL
316374	2010 SK_{39}	—	July 9, 2005	Kitt Peak	Spacewatch	·	1.7 km	MPC · JPL
316375	2010 TJ_{3}	—	November 19, 2006	Kitt Peak	Spacewatch	(12739)	1.6 km	MPC · JPL
316376	2010 TL_{9}	—	September 20, 2001	Socorro	LINEAR	NEM	2.2 km	MPC · JPL
316377	2010 TQ_{9}	—	November 15, 2006	Kitt Peak	Spacewatch	·	1.5 km	MPC · JPL
316378	2010 TG_{12}	—	September 19, 2006	Catalina	CSS	V	900 m	MPC · JPL
316379	2010 TA_{14}	—	November 22, 2006	Kitt Peak	Spacewatch	·	1.5 km	MPC · JPL
316380	2010 TE_{15}	—	March 3, 1997	Kitt Peak	Spacewatch	·	1.2 km	MPC · JPL
316381	2010 TJ_{17}	—	December 4, 2005	Kitt Peak	Spacewatch	·	3.4 km	MPC · JPL
316382	2010 TV_{23}	—	March 26, 2008	Mount Lemmon	Mount Lemmon Survey	·	1.7 km	MPC · JPL
316383	2010 TW_{23}	—	April 14, 2004	Kitt Peak	Spacewatch	·	1.9 km	MPC · JPL
316384	2010 TV_{24}	—	October 28, 2005	Catalina	CSS	·	4.3 km	MPC · JPL
316385	2010 TX_{28}	—	April 13, 2004	Kitt Peak	Spacewatch	·	1.6 km	MPC · JPL
316386	2010 TN_{34}	—	February 13, 2008	Mount Lemmon	Mount Lemmon Survey	·	1.7 km	MPC · JPL
316387	2010 TD_{35}	—	December 2, 1994	Kitt Peak	Spacewatch	EOS	2.3 km	MPC · JPL
316388	2010 TL_{35}	—	February 10, 2002	Socorro	LINEAR	·	1.9 km	MPC · JPL
316389	2010 TC_{36}	—	May 13, 2004	Kitt Peak	Spacewatch	HOF	2.5 km	MPC · JPL
316390	2010 TB_{41}	—	December 1, 2006	Kitt Peak	Spacewatch	·	2.3 km	MPC · JPL
316391	2010 TF_{43}	—	October 14, 2001	Apache Point	SDSS	·	1.3 km	MPC · JPL
316392	2010 TL_{46}	—	November 19, 2003	Kitt Peak	Spacewatch	·	1.5 km	MPC · JPL
316393	2010 TY_{49}	—	November 10, 1999	Kitt Peak	Spacewatch	·	3.7 km	MPC · JPL
316394	2010 TQ_{50}	—	April 15, 2008	Mount Lemmon	Mount Lemmon Survey	EOS	2.3 km	MPC · JPL
316395	2010 TW_{52}	—	March 16, 2005	Mount Lemmon	Mount Lemmon Survey	MAS	720 m	MPC · JPL
316396	2010 TK_{53}	—	October 22, 2005	Kitt Peak	Spacewatch	·	1.9 km	MPC · JPL
316397	2010 TZ_{56}	—	September 23, 2005	Kitt Peak	Spacewatch	·	2.5 km	MPC · JPL
316398	2010 TE_{62}	—	December 27, 2006	Mount Lemmon	Mount Lemmon Survey	·	1.8 km	MPC · JPL
316399	2010 TL_{62}	—	January 30, 2000	Kitt Peak	Spacewatch	·	1.4 km	MPC · JPL
316400	2010 TQ_{65}	—	August 29, 2006	Kitt Peak	Spacewatch	·	1.5 km	MPC · JPL

== 316401–316500 ==
back to top

Designation			Discovery			Properties		Ref
Permanent	Provisional	Named after	Date	Site	Discoverer(s)	Category	Diam.	Ref
316401	2010 TB_{67}	—	September 11, 2005	Kitt Peak	Spacewatch	KOR	1.3 km	MPC · JPL
316402	2010 TB_{70}	—	March 8, 2008	Mount Lemmon	Mount Lemmon Survey	WIT	1.1 km	MPC · JPL
316403	2010 TA_{72}	—	November 16, 2006	Kitt Peak	Spacewatch	(12739)	1.7 km	MPC · JPL
316404	2010 TP_{74}	—	March 19, 1999	Kitt Peak	Spacewatch	·	640 m	MPC · JPL
316405	2010 TG_{75}	—	March 11, 2005	Mount Lemmon	Mount Lemmon Survey	V	790 m	MPC · JPL
316406	2010 TJ_{81}	—	May 9, 2002	Socorro	LINEAR	V	970 m	MPC · JPL
316407	2010 TM_{84}	—	September 13, 2005	Kitt Peak	Spacewatch	KOR	1.2 km	MPC · JPL
316408	2010 TY_{89}	—	March 11, 2008	Kitt Peak	Spacewatch	KOR	1.3 km	MPC · JPL
316409	2010 TS_{91}	—	February 28, 2008	Mount Lemmon	Mount Lemmon Survey	·	1.7 km	MPC · JPL
316410	2010 TG_{95}	—	August 29, 2005	Kitt Peak	Spacewatch	KOR	1.3 km	MPC · JPL
316411	2010 TY_{99}	—	September 23, 2005	Kitt Peak	Spacewatch	HOF	2.5 km	MPC · JPL
316412	2010 TT_{100}	—	August 27, 2005	Kitt Peak	Spacewatch	KOR	1.6 km	MPC · JPL
316413	2010 TV_{100}	—	March 11, 2005	Kitt Peak	Spacewatch	MAS	900 m	MPC · JPL
316414	2010 TY_{103}	—	April 2, 1995	Kitt Peak	Spacewatch	·	1.7 km	MPC · JPL
316415	2010 TB_{109}	—	January 29, 2003	Apache Point	SDSS	(12739)	1.7 km	MPC · JPL
316416	2010 TF_{111}	—	October 15, 2001	Kitt Peak	Spacewatch	·	1.8 km	MPC · JPL
316417	2010 TN_{115}	—	March 14, 2007	Mount Lemmon	Mount Lemmon Survey	·	3.5 km	MPC · JPL
316418	2010 TU_{116}	—	August 28, 2005	Kitt Peak	Spacewatch	AST	2.0 km	MPC · JPL
316419	2010 TW_{116}	—	April 3, 2008	Mount Lemmon	Mount Lemmon Survey	HOF	2.1 km	MPC · JPL
316420	2010 TE_{120}	—	September 12, 2001	Kitt Peak	Spacewatch	·	2.0 km	MPC · JPL
316421	2010 TA_{122}	—	November 25, 2006	Kitt Peak	Spacewatch	AGN	1.3 km	MPC · JPL
316422	2010 TZ_{130}	—	August 22, 2004	Kitt Peak	Spacewatch	·	3.4 km	MPC · JPL
316423	2010 TM_{136}	—	April 30, 1997	Kitt Peak	Spacewatch	PHO	2.8 km	MPC · JPL
316424	2010 TK_{139}	—	July 30, 2009	Kitt Peak	Spacewatch	·	2.8 km	MPC · JPL
316425	2010 TK_{143}	—	November 15, 2006	Mount Lemmon	Mount Lemmon Survey	·	2.3 km	MPC · JPL
316426	2010 TG_{150}	—	November 17, 2001	Socorro	LINEAR	(13314)	3.0 km	MPC · JPL
316427	2010 TS_{151}	—	September 28, 2006	Mount Lemmon	Mount Lemmon Survey	·	1.9 km	MPC · JPL
316428	2010 TY_{152}	—	February 23, 2007	Kitt Peak	Spacewatch	·	2.2 km	MPC · JPL
316429	2010 TC_{159}	—	March 17, 2009	Catalina	CSS	·	760 m	MPC · JPL
316430	2010 TF_{166}	—	April 5, 2008	Kitt Peak	Spacewatch	·	3.2 km	MPC · JPL
316431	2010 TH_{167}	—	October 15, 2010	Sandlot	G. Hug	L4	10 km	MPC · JPL
316432	2010 TQ_{167}	—	August 21, 2006	Kitt Peak	Spacewatch	V	810 m	MPC · JPL
316433	2010 TP_{168}	—	October 9, 2010	Mount Lemmon	Mount Lemmon Survey	EOS	2.8 km	MPC · JPL
316434	2010 TL_{172}	—	September 27, 2006	Kitt Peak	Spacewatch	·	1.3 km	MPC · JPL
316435	2010 TG_{175}	—	August 31, 2003	Socorro	LINEAR	V	910 m	MPC · JPL
316436	2010 TX_{182}	—	September 28, 2006	Kitt Peak	Spacewatch	·	1.2 km	MPC · JPL
316437	2010 UA_{1}	—	September 10, 2004	Socorro	LINEAR	EOS	3.0 km	MPC · JPL
316438	2010 UN_{4}	—	September 1, 2005	Palomar	NEAT	GEF	2.0 km	MPC · JPL
316439	2010 UT_{11}	—	September 30, 2006	Catalina	CSS	·	2.1 km	MPC · JPL
316440	2010 UL_{17}	—	December 16, 2000	Kitt Peak	Spacewatch	·	3.0 km	MPC · JPL
316441	2010 UY_{21}	—	September 30, 2006	Mount Lemmon	Mount Lemmon Survey	·	1.5 km	MPC · JPL
316442	2010 UJ_{32}	—	February 4, 2005	Mount Lemmon	Mount Lemmon Survey	·	1.1 km	MPC · JPL
316443	2010 UF_{47}	—	March 11, 2005	Kitt Peak	Spacewatch	V	850 m	MPC · JPL
316444	2010 UJ_{49}	—	November 5, 2005	Kitt Peak	Spacewatch	·	2.9 km	MPC · JPL
316445	2010 UQ_{51}	—	December 21, 2005	Kitt Peak	Spacewatch	·	3.8 km	MPC · JPL
316446	2010 UT_{53}	—	February 13, 2002	Apache Point	SDSS	L4 · ERY	8.6 km	MPC · JPL
316447	2010 UM_{58}	—	April 12, 2002	Palomar	NEAT	·	4.1 km	MPC · JPL
316448	2010 UA_{63}	—	September 3, 2000	Apache Point	SDSS	·	2.7 km	MPC · JPL
316449	2010 UL_{65}	—	December 1, 2006	Mount Lemmon	Mount Lemmon Survey	·	1.6 km	MPC · JPL
316450 Changhsiangtung	2010 UZ_{71}	Changhsiangtung	February 29, 2008	XuYi	PMO NEO Survey Program	·	2.1 km	MPC · JPL
316451	2010 UQ_{72}	—	February 24, 2008	Mount Lemmon	Mount Lemmon Survey	·	1.7 km	MPC · JPL
316452	2010 UM_{74}	—	July 30, 2005	Palomar	NEAT	·	2.5 km	MPC · JPL
316453	2010 US_{76}	—	September 16, 2003	Kitt Peak	Spacewatch	·	4.8 km	MPC · JPL
316454	2010 UY_{78}	—	August 25, 2005	Palomar	NEAT	WIT	1.7 km	MPC · JPL
316455	2010 UW_{81}	—	October 28, 2010	Catalina	CSS	·	2.9 km	MPC · JPL
316456	2010 UK_{82}	—	September 30, 2005	Kitt Peak	Spacewatch	·	1.9 km	MPC · JPL
316457	2010 UC_{84}	—	September 13, 2005	Kitt Peak	Spacewatch	AGN	1.4 km	MPC · JPL
316458	2010 UA_{88}	—	July 18, 2005	Palomar	NEAT	·	2.5 km	MPC · JPL
316459	2010 UN_{89}	—	March 19, 2001	Anderson Mesa	LONEOS	·	1.4 km	MPC · JPL
316460	2010 UP_{91}	—	August 15, 2004	Campo Imperatore	CINEOS	·	2.9 km	MPC · JPL
316461	2010 UQ_{91}	—	September 3, 2008	Kitt Peak	Spacewatch	L4	8.4 km	MPC · JPL
316462	2010 UE_{95}	—	September 19, 2001	Socorro	LINEAR	·	2.3 km	MPC · JPL
316463	2010 UR_{95}	—	May 28, 2000	Socorro	LINEAR	·	2.4 km	MPC · JPL
316464	2010 UT_{95}	—	August 8, 2004	Socorro	LINEAR	·	3.5 km	MPC · JPL
316465	2010 UA_{96}	—	August 11, 2004	Socorro	LINEAR	·	2.9 km	MPC · JPL
316466	2010 UW_{97}	—	November 30, 2005	Kitt Peak	Spacewatch	·	2.9 km	MPC · JPL
316467	2010 UC_{98}	—	April 15, 1996	Kitt Peak	Spacewatch	·	1.5 km	MPC · JPL
316468	2010 UH_{98}	—	March 15, 2004	Kitt Peak	Spacewatch	·	1.4 km	MPC · JPL
316469	2010 UG_{99}	—	October 21, 2001	Kitt Peak	Spacewatch	·	1.7 km	MPC · JPL
316470	2010 VE_{7}	—	October 8, 1999	Kitt Peak	Spacewatch	HYG	2.7 km	MPC · JPL
316471	2010 VD_{11}	—	February 11, 2002	Socorro	LINEAR	·	2.4 km	MPC · JPL
316472	2010 VF_{14}	—	June 17, 2009	Kitt Peak	Spacewatch	T_{j} (2.98) · 3:2	3.6 km	MPC · JPL
316473	2010 VD_{17}	—	November 25, 2005	Catalina	CSS	·	3.4 km	MPC · JPL
316474	2010 VR_{24}	—	December 4, 1999	Kitt Peak	Spacewatch	·	3.1 km	MPC · JPL
316475	2010 VQ_{29}	—	September 17, 2004	Socorro	LINEAR	·	2.9 km	MPC · JPL
316476	2010 VT_{30}	—	March 14, 2007	Catalina	CSS	·	5.4 km	MPC · JPL
316477	2010 VD_{36}	—	August 21, 2006	Kitt Peak	Spacewatch	KON	3.4 km	MPC · JPL
316478	2010 VW_{36}	—	September 15, 2004	Kitt Peak	Spacewatch	·	2.9 km	MPC · JPL
316479	2010 VJ_{44}	—	October 25, 2005	Mount Lemmon	Mount Lemmon Survey	·	2.8 km	MPC · JPL
316480	2010 VX_{46}	—	October 4, 2004	Kitt Peak	Spacewatch	·	3.6 km	MPC · JPL
316481	2010 VN_{47}	—	September 4, 2010	Kitt Peak	Spacewatch	·	3.8 km	MPC · JPL
316482	2010 VP_{47}	—	October 10, 2005	Kitt Peak	Spacewatch	AGN	1.4 km	MPC · JPL
316483	2010 VD_{52}	—	January 17, 2007	Mount Lemmon	Mount Lemmon Survey	THM	2.9 km	MPC · JPL
316484	2010 VM_{61}	—	November 4, 2010	La Sagra	OAM	L4 · ERY	10 km	MPC · JPL
316485	2010 VV_{70}	—	January 10, 2007	Kitt Peak	Spacewatch	·	2.6 km	MPC · JPL
316486	2010 VK_{71}	—	July 13, 2001	Palomar	NEAT	·	1.9 km	MPC · JPL
316487	2010 VT_{76}	—	November 2, 2005	Mount Lemmon	Mount Lemmon Survey	EOS	2.0 km	MPC · JPL
316488	2010 VD_{77}	—	November 16, 2001	Kitt Peak	Spacewatch	·	2.4 km	MPC · JPL
316489	2010 VB_{82}	—	September 29, 2001	Palomar	NEAT	·	2.4 km	MPC · JPL
316490	2010 VE_{85}	—	November 1, 1999	Kitt Peak	Spacewatch	·	2.6 km	MPC · JPL
316491	2010 VZ_{86}	—	October 3, 2005	Kitt Peak	Spacewatch	·	2.1 km	MPC · JPL
316492	2010 VJ_{93}	—	October 22, 2003	Kitt Peak	Spacewatch	CYB	4.2 km	MPC · JPL
316493	2010 VM_{97}	—	November 25, 2005	Kitt Peak	Spacewatch	·	2.5 km	MPC · JPL
316494	2010 VX_{97}	—	April 13, 2004	Kitt Peak	Spacewatch	·	1.9 km	MPC · JPL
316495	2010 VV_{99}	—	January 16, 2005	Kitt Peak	Spacewatch	·	1 km	MPC · JPL
316496	2010 VT_{102}	—	November 30, 2005	Kitt Peak	Spacewatch	·	2.2 km	MPC · JPL
316497	2010 VG_{103}	—	May 5, 2008	Mount Lemmon	Mount Lemmon Survey	EOS	2.5 km	MPC · JPL
316498	2010 VK_{104}	—	September 7, 1999	Kitt Peak	Spacewatch	·	2.6 km	MPC · JPL
316499	2010 VC_{111}	—	September 23, 2004	Kitt Peak	Spacewatch	·	3.7 km	MPC · JPL
316500	2010 VF_{112}	—	January 27, 2007	Mount Lemmon	Mount Lemmon Survey	·	2.1 km	MPC · JPL

== 316501–316600 ==
back to top

Designation			Discovery			Properties		Ref
Permanent	Provisional	Named after	Date	Site	Discoverer(s)	Category	Diam.	Ref
316501	2010 VB_{113}	—	October 23, 2006	Mount Lemmon	Mount Lemmon Survey	·	1.6 km	MPC · JPL
316502	2010 VC_{116}	—	January 29, 2003	Kitt Peak	Spacewatch	·	1.9 km	MPC · JPL
316503	2010 VN_{117}	—	September 16, 2003	Kitt Peak	Spacewatch	URS	5.5 km	MPC · JPL
316504	2010 VU_{117}	—	October 18, 2004	Kitt Peak	Deep Ecliptic Survey	·	4.1 km	MPC · JPL
316505	2010 VY_{130}	—	March 21, 2002	Kitt Peak	Spacewatch	·	4.8 km	MPC · JPL
316506	2010 VC_{136}	—	November 5, 2005	Kitt Peak	Spacewatch	KOR	1.6 km	MPC · JPL
316507	2010 VK_{143}	—	April 11, 2003	Kitt Peak	Spacewatch	·	2.1 km	MPC · JPL
316508	2010 VD_{144}	—	May 2, 2003	Kitt Peak	Spacewatch	L4	10 km	MPC · JPL
316509	2010 VW_{152}	—	October 22, 2005	Kitt Peak	Spacewatch	KOR	1.7 km	MPC · JPL
316510	2010 VT_{153}	—	November 20, 2001	Socorro	LINEAR	·	2.6 km	MPC · JPL
316511	2010 VT_{156}	—	March 10, 2007	Mount Lemmon	Mount Lemmon Survey	EOS	2.6 km	MPC · JPL
316512	2010 VL_{160}	—	February 9, 2005	Kitt Peak	Spacewatch	·	1.0 km	MPC · JPL
316513	2010 VT_{160}	—	August 30, 2005	Kitt Peak	Spacewatch	·	2.0 km	MPC · JPL
316514	2010 VM_{162}	—	February 10, 2007	Mount Lemmon	Mount Lemmon Survey	·	2.7 km	MPC · JPL
316515	2010 VX_{162}	—	September 26, 2005	Kitt Peak	Spacewatch	MRX	1.3 km	MPC · JPL
316516	2010 VL_{164}	—	November 11, 2004	Kitt Peak	Spacewatch	CYB	4.6 km	MPC · JPL
316517	2010 VD_{167}	—	September 29, 2005	Kitt Peak	Spacewatch	·	1.9 km	MPC · JPL
316518	2010 VR_{168}	—	February 23, 2007	Catalina	CSS	EOS	2.3 km	MPC · JPL
316519	2010 VO_{169}	—	September 23, 2004	Kitt Peak	Spacewatch	·	2.4 km	MPC · JPL
316520	2010 VD_{182}	—	January 4, 2006	Mount Lemmon	Mount Lemmon Survey	·	4.4 km	MPC · JPL
316521	2010 VZ_{192}	—	October 1, 2000	Kitt Peak	Spacewatch	·	2.4 km	MPC · JPL
316522	2010 VP_{193}	—	August 18, 2009	Kitt Peak	Spacewatch	3:2	5.3 km	MPC · JPL
316523	2010 VL_{195}	—	August 22, 2004	Kitt Peak	Spacewatch	·	2.9 km	MPC · JPL
316524	2010 VE_{196}	—	January 1, 2001	Kitt Peak	Spacewatch	·	4.3 km	MPC · JPL
316525	2010 VN_{200}	—	January 5, 2006	Catalina	CSS	VER	3.5 km	MPC · JPL
316526	2010 VX_{200}	—	December 29, 2005	Socorro	LINEAR	·	3.5 km	MPC · JPL
316527 Jürgenoberst	2010 VW_{201}	Jürgenoberst	March 19, 2001	Socorro	LINEAR	·	4.9 km	MPC · JPL
316528	2010 VC_{202}	—	March 18, 2004	Kitt Peak	Spacewatch	L4	10 km	MPC · JPL
316529	2010 WM	—	October 13, 2001	Kitt Peak	Spacewatch	·	2.1 km	MPC · JPL
316530	2010 WK_{4}	—	April 4, 2005	Catalina	CSS	V	920 m	MPC · JPL
316531	2010 WL_{12}	—	September 7, 2004	Kitt Peak	Spacewatch	EOS	1.7 km	MPC · JPL
316532	2010 WC_{17}	—	January 27, 2007	Kitt Peak	Spacewatch	·	2.1 km	MPC · JPL
316533	2010 WB_{29}	—	April 25, 2007	Kitt Peak	Spacewatch	CYB	5.2 km	MPC · JPL
316534	2010 WF_{32}	—	October 8, 2004	Kitt Peak	Spacewatch	·	3.1 km	MPC · JPL
316535	2010 WA_{34}	—	October 25, 2005	Mount Lemmon	Mount Lemmon Survey	KOR	1.9 km	MPC · JPL
316536	2010 WT_{35}	—	November 27, 1998	Kitt Peak	Spacewatch	L4	6.8 km	MPC · JPL
316537	2010 WP_{58}	—	September 27, 2009	Mount Lemmon	Mount Lemmon Survey	L4	10 km	MPC · JPL
316538	2010 WG_{67}	—	November 2, 2010	Kitt Peak	Spacewatch	L4	10 km	MPC · JPL
316539	2010 WN_{68}	—	August 7, 2008	Kitt Peak	Spacewatch	3:2 · SHU	5.9 km	MPC · JPL
316540	2010 WZ_{70}	—	November 7, 1996	Kitt Peak	Spacewatch	AGN	1.4 km	MPC · JPL
316541	2010 WV_{72}	—	March 30, 2008	Kitt Peak	Spacewatch	HYG	3.3 km	MPC · JPL
316542	2010 XJ_{21}	—	October 21, 2003	Kitt Peak	Spacewatch	CYB	5.5 km	MPC · JPL
316543	2010 XG_{35}	—	August 10, 2010	Kitt Peak	Spacewatch	·	2.3 km	MPC · JPL
316544	2010 XJ_{47}	—	April 1, 2008	Mount Lemmon	Mount Lemmon Survey	·	2.3 km	MPC · JPL
316545	2010 XX_{47}	—	August 28, 2005	Kitt Peak	Spacewatch	·	1.9 km	MPC · JPL
316546	2010 XY_{66}	—	April 29, 2008	Mount Lemmon	Mount Lemmon Survey	·	2.5 km	MPC · JPL
316547	2010 XP_{68}	—	October 15, 2004	Mount Lemmon	Mount Lemmon Survey	URS	5.1 km	MPC · JPL
316548	2010 XR_{72}	—	July 19, 2009	Siding Spring	SSS	URS	5.2 km	MPC · JPL
316549	2010 XD_{78}	—	October 9, 1993	La Silla	E. W. Elst	EOS	2.8 km	MPC · JPL
316550	2010 XE_{81}	—	January 17, 2010	WISE	WISE	L4	10 km	MPC · JPL
316551	2010 XA_{84}	—	August 24, 2008	Kitt Peak	Spacewatch	L4 · ERY	8.5 km	MPC · JPL
316552	2010 XF_{87}	—	April 7, 2003	Kitt Peak	Spacewatch	L4 · (8060)	9.8 km	MPC · JPL
316553	2010 YT_{1}	—	October 13, 2009	La Sagra	OAM	L4	14 km	MPC · JPL
316554	2011 AU_{49}	—	January 31, 2006	Kitt Peak	Spacewatch	·	2.1 km	MPC · JPL
316555	2011 AY_{77}	—	September 21, 2008	Mount Lemmon	Mount Lemmon Survey	T_{j} (2.98) · EUP	4.2 km	MPC · JPL
316556	2011 BD_{102}	—	October 17, 2003	Kitt Peak	Spacewatch	EOS	2.7 km	MPC · JPL
316557	2011 CD_{3}	—	April 25, 2001	Anderson Mesa	LONEOS	·	3.4 km	MPC · JPL
316558	2011 CR_{29}	—	April 5, 2000	Socorro	LINEAR	MAS	990 m	MPC · JPL
316559	2011 DZ_{51}	—	September 18, 1995	Kitt Peak	Spacewatch	·	2.3 km	MPC · JPL
316560	2011 EZ_{22}	—	October 1, 2005	Mount Lemmon	Mount Lemmon Survey	·	1.4 km	MPC · JPL
316561	2011 EN_{28}	—	October 17, 2009	Catalina	CSS	·	1.1 km	MPC · JPL
316562	2011 FB_{45}	—	October 16, 1999	Kitt Peak	Spacewatch	·	2.1 km	MPC · JPL
316563	2011 FL_{56}	—	May 6, 2002	Kitt Peak	Spacewatch	·	3.3 km	MPC · JPL
316564	2011 FJ_{88}	—	February 13, 2002	Kitt Peak	Spacewatch	·	1.5 km	MPC · JPL
316565	2011 FG_{131}	—	February 24, 2006	Mount Lemmon	Mount Lemmon Survey	·	2.3 km	MPC · JPL
316566	2011 GN_{67}	—	December 10, 2009	Mount Lemmon	Mount Lemmon Survey	HOF	3.2 km	MPC · JPL
316567	2011 GY_{77}	—	November 8, 2008	Kitt Peak	Spacewatch	·	4.9 km	MPC · JPL
316568	2011 GZ_{77}	—	February 15, 2007	Catalina	CSS	·	1.4 km	MPC · JPL
316569	2011 MD_{4}	—	October 30, 2005	Mount Lemmon	Mount Lemmon Survey	·	820 m	MPC · JPL
316570	2011 QE_{67}	—	September 12, 2007	Catalina	CSS	·	1.8 km	MPC · JPL
316571	2011 RA_{19}	—	August 20, 2006	Palomar	NEAT	·	1.8 km	MPC · JPL
316572	2011 SW_{24}	—	March 10, 1997	Kitt Peak	Spacewatch	·	2.9 km	MPC · JPL
316573	2011 SM_{47}	—	September 19, 2006	Catalina	CSS	EOS	2.8 km	MPC · JPL
316574	2011 SX_{105}	—	September 27, 2006	Catalina	CSS	·	3.4 km	MPC · JPL
316575	2011 SL_{116}	—	August 1, 2000	Cerro Tololo	Deep Ecliptic Survey	·	2.7 km	MPC · JPL
316576	2011 SS_{116}	—	December 30, 2008	Kitt Peak	Spacewatch	NYS	1.5 km	MPC · JPL
316577	2011 SB_{210}	—	February 7, 2002	Kitt Peak	Spacewatch	V	700 m	MPC · JPL
316578	2011 SV_{254}	—	October 11, 2004	Kitt Peak	Spacewatch	·	2.3 km	MPC · JPL
316579	2011 TD_{5}	—	October 13, 2002	Palomar	NEAT	·	2.3 km	MPC · JPL
316580	2011 TR_{5}	—	September 8, 2001	Socorro	LINEAR	·	2.2 km	MPC · JPL
316581	2011 TX_{14}	—	August 26, 2000	Socorro	LINEAR	·	3.7 km	MPC · JPL
316582	2011 US_{13}	—	March 24, 2003	Kitt Peak	Spacewatch	·	3.5 km	MPC · JPL
316583	2011 UU_{25}	—	January 8, 2002	Kitt Peak	Spacewatch	·	2.5 km	MPC · JPL
316584	2011 UJ_{61}	—	March 17, 2004	Catalina	CSS	·	4.3 km	MPC · JPL
316585	2011 UV_{80}	—	September 27, 2006	Mount Lemmon	Mount Lemmon Survey	·	2.5 km	MPC · JPL
316586	2011 UV_{146}	—	March 29, 2009	Siding Spring	SSS	·	3.2 km	MPC · JPL
316587	2011 UH_{157}	—	October 15, 2002	Palomar	NEAT	·	1.9 km	MPC · JPL
316588	2011 UA_{159}	—	March 15, 2002	Kitt Peak	Spacewatch	PHO	1.6 km	MPC · JPL
316589	2011 UQ_{162}	—	August 16, 2004	Siding Spring	SSS	·	5.1 km	MPC · JPL
316590	2011 UX_{162}	—	January 25, 2009	Catalina	CSS	·	1.5 km	MPC · JPL
316591	2011 UA_{172}	—	September 24, 2000	Socorro	LINEAR	·	3.3 km	MPC · JPL
316592	2011 US_{173}	—	April 16, 2004	Socorro	LINEAR	·	4.9 km	MPC · JPL
316593	2011 UY_{186}	—	August 25, 2001	Socorro	LINEAR	·	750 m	MPC · JPL
316594	2011 UL_{190}	—	November 15, 1998	Kitt Peak	Spacewatch	·	4.1 km	MPC · JPL
316595	2011 UV_{198}	—	September 29, 2005	Kitt Peak	Spacewatch	THM	2.3 km	MPC · JPL
316596	2011 UR_{200}	—	November 20, 2006	Mount Lemmon	Mount Lemmon Survey	·	3.4 km	MPC · JPL
316597	2011 UT_{206}	—	January 15, 1999	Kitt Peak	Spacewatch	·	4.0 km	MPC · JPL
316598	2011 UW_{289}	—	February 29, 2008	XuYi	PMO NEO Survey Program	·	4.4 km	MPC · JPL
316599	2011 UX_{311}	—	August 6, 2005	Palomar	NEAT	·	2.5 km	MPC · JPL
316600	2011 UC_{331}	—	May 14, 2005	Mount Lemmon	Mount Lemmon Survey	·	2.3 km	MPC · JPL

== 316601–316700 ==
back to top

Designation			Discovery			Properties		Ref
Permanent	Provisional	Named after	Date	Site	Discoverer(s)	Category	Diam.	Ref
316601	2011 UQ_{337}	—	December 27, 1999	Kitt Peak	Spacewatch	·	1.8 km	MPC · JPL
316602	2011 US_{338}	—	October 28, 1995	Kitt Peak	Spacewatch	·	3.3 km	MPC · JPL
316603	2011 UJ_{359}	—	September 12, 2001	Kitt Peak	Spacewatch	PAD	2.9 km	MPC · JPL
316604	2011 VG_{5}	—	June 4, 2003	Kitt Peak	Spacewatch	ULA · CYB ·	6.6 km	MPC · JPL
316605	2011 VM_{16}	—	November 16, 2006	Mount Lemmon	Mount Lemmon Survey	·	2.8 km	MPC · JPL
316606	2011 VZ_{18}	—	March 27, 2009	Mount Lemmon	Mount Lemmon Survey	·	2.2 km	MPC · JPL
316607	2011 WC_{3}	—	October 12, 2005	Kitt Peak	Spacewatch	·	3.3 km	MPC · JPL
316608	2011 WC_{10}	—	July 27, 2005	Palomar	NEAT	KOR	2.0 km	MPC · JPL
316609	2011 WU_{16}	—	October 7, 2004	Socorro	LINEAR	·	1.1 km	MPC · JPL
316610	2011 WK_{27}	—	November 13, 2002	Palomar	NEAT	·	2.3 km	MPC · JPL
316611	2011 WA_{30}	—	April 26, 2006	Siding Spring	SSS	·	2.6 km	MPC · JPL
316612	2011 WS_{35}	—	May 18, 2002	Palomar	NEAT	·	1.8 km	MPC · JPL
316613	2011 WV_{38}	—	October 9, 2002	Socorro	LINEAR	MIS	2.6 km	MPC · JPL
316614	2011 WX_{41}	—	May 22, 2006	Kitt Peak	Spacewatch	·	1.8 km	MPC · JPL
316615	2011 WO_{43}	—	October 8, 2002	Palomar	NEAT	·	2.0 km	MPC · JPL
316616	2011 WT_{43}	—	September 24, 1960	Palomar	C. J. van Houten, I. van Houten-Groeneveld, T. Gehrels	(5)	1.5 km	MPC · JPL
316617	2011 WJ_{46}	—	September 16, 2009	Catalina	CSS	L4	10 km	MPC · JPL
316618	2011 WJ_{57}	—	May 3, 2003	Kitt Peak	Spacewatch	·	3.1 km	MPC · JPL
316619	2011 WU_{57}	—	October 29, 2005	Catalina	CSS	·	4.4 km	MPC · JPL
316620	2011 WY_{63}	—	March 26, 2001	Kitt Peak	Spacewatch	NYS	960 m	MPC · JPL
316621	2011 WN_{70}	—	August 31, 2005	Kitt Peak	Spacewatch	THM	2.1 km	MPC · JPL
316622	2011 WB_{71}	—	September 28, 2006	Catalina	CSS	·	2.7 km	MPC · JPL
316623	2011 WH_{85}	—	November 4, 2002	Kitt Peak	Spacewatch	·	2.1 km	MPC · JPL
316624	2011 WM_{88}	—	January 20, 2001	Haleakala	NEAT	L4	20 km	MPC · JPL
316625	2011 WF_{89}	—	July 5, 2005	Kitt Peak	Spacewatch	·	2.1 km	MPC · JPL
316626	2011 WT_{90}	—	October 16, 1998	Kitt Peak	Spacewatch	L4	10 km	MPC · JPL
316627	2011 WH_{100}	—	April 5, 2003	Kitt Peak	Spacewatch	·	1 km	MPC · JPL
316628	2011 WL_{112}	—	December 6, 2002	Socorro	LINEAR	·	2.2 km	MPC · JPL
316629	2011 WR_{113}	—	June 19, 2007	Kitt Peak	Spacewatch	L4	10 km	MPC · JPL
316630	2011 WF_{114}	—	November 29, 1995	Kitt Peak	Spacewatch	EUN	1.8 km	MPC · JPL
316631	2011 WY_{114}	—	October 30, 2005	Mount Lemmon	Mount Lemmon Survey	CYB	5.8 km	MPC · JPL
316632	2011 WS_{116}	—	August 17, 2002	Haleakala	NEAT	·	2.4 km	MPC · JPL
316633	2011 WR_{119}	—	October 20, 2006	Kitt Peak	Spacewatch	KOR	1.5 km	MPC · JPL
316634	2011 WK_{126}	—	December 29, 2003	Kitt Peak	Spacewatch	·	1.2 km	MPC · JPL
316635	2011 XO	—	May 26, 2006	Mount Lemmon	Mount Lemmon Survey	·	1.9 km	MPC · JPL
316636	2011 XY	—	December 24, 1997	Xinglong	SCAP	H	1.0 km	MPC · JPL
316637	2011 XK_{1}	—	September 27, 2006	Catalina	CSS	JUN	1.4 km	MPC · JPL
316638	2011 YA_{2}	—	May 22, 2006	Kitt Peak	Spacewatch	V	800 m	MPC · JPL
316639	2011 YA_{22}	—	October 25, 2005	Kitt Peak	Spacewatch	·	4.7 km	MPC · JPL
316640	2011 YA_{23}	—	October 26, 2005	Kitt Peak	Spacewatch	EOS	2.4 km	MPC · JPL
316641	2011 YF_{23}	—	November 5, 2005	Mount Lemmon	Mount Lemmon Survey	·	2.7 km	MPC · JPL
316642	2011 YU_{23}	—	September 28, 2003	Anderson Mesa	LONEOS	PHO	2.2 km	MPC · JPL
316643	2011 YV_{25}	—	March 10, 2005	Catalina	CSS	·	1.9 km	MPC · JPL
316644	2011 YE_{26}	—	August 25, 1995	Kitt Peak	Spacewatch	·	2.7 km	MPC · JPL
316645	2011 YF_{35}	—	February 13, 2004	Kitt Peak	Spacewatch	(5)	1.4 km	MPC · JPL
316646	2011 YS_{37}	—	September 26, 2003	Apache Point	SDSS	·	1.2 km	MPC · JPL
316647	2011 YU_{38}	—	January 28, 1996	Kitt Peak	Spacewatch	·	2.4 km	MPC · JPL
316648	2011 YU_{57}	—	November 22, 2005	Kitt Peak	Spacewatch	·	4.6 km	MPC · JPL
316649	1019 T-2	—	September 29, 1973	Palomar	C. J. van Houten, I. van Houten-Groeneveld, T. Gehrels	·	1.8 km	MPC · JPL
316650	1987 UL	—	October 17, 1987	Palomar	C. S. Shoemaker	·	2.3 km	MPC · JPL
316651	1990 OL	—	July 22, 1990	Palomar	E. F. Helin	·	2.9 km	MPC · JPL
316652	1992 EK_{13}	—	March 2, 1992	La Silla	UESAC	·	1.4 km	MPC · JPL
316653	1993 BV_{8}	—	January 21, 1993	Kitt Peak	Spacewatch	·	1.6 km	MPC · JPL
316654	1993 NF_{1}	—	July 12, 1993	La Silla	E. W. Elst	·	2.2 km	MPC · JPL
316655	1993 TT_{7}	—	October 9, 1993	Kitt Peak	Spacewatch	·	3.5 km	MPC · JPL
316656	1993 TQ_{10}	—	October 15, 1993	Kitt Peak	Spacewatch	·	3.7 km	MPC · JPL
316657	1993 TQ_{22}	—	October 9, 1993	La Silla	E. W. Elst	·	900 m	MPC · JPL
316658	1993 TC_{46}	—	October 10, 1993	La Silla	E. W. Elst	·	2.4 km	MPC · JPL
316659	1993 UV_{1}	—	October 20, 1993	Kitt Peak	Spacewatch	·	1.5 km	MPC · JPL
316660	1993 YM_{1}	—	December 16, 1993	Kitt Peak	Spacewatch	·	1.4 km	MPC · JPL
316661	1994 JZ_{3}	—	May 3, 1994	Kitt Peak	Spacewatch	·	1.0 km	MPC · JPL
316662	1994 SZ_{1}	—	September 27, 1994	Kitt Peak	Spacewatch	NYS	1.4 km	MPC · JPL
316663	1994 SV_{11}	—	September 29, 1994	Kitt Peak	Spacewatch	·	2.6 km	MPC · JPL
316664	1995 BU_{11}	—	January 29, 1995	Kitt Peak	Spacewatch	NYS	740 m	MPC · JPL
316665	1995 DD_{6}	—	February 24, 1995	Kitt Peak	Spacewatch	·	650 m	MPC · JPL
316666	1995 DG_{10}	—	February 25, 1995	Kitt Peak	Spacewatch	·	3.7 km	MPC · JPL
316667	1995 FG_{4}	—	March 23, 1995	Kitt Peak	Spacewatch	·	3.9 km	MPC · JPL
316668	1995 OT_{10}	—	July 22, 1995	Kitt Peak	Spacewatch	·	890 m	MPC · JPL
316669	1995 OE_{16}	—	July 26, 1995	Kitt Peak	Spacewatch	MRX	1.1 km	MPC · JPL
316670	1995 QE_{14}	—	August 27, 1995	Kitt Peak	Spacewatch	·	1.9 km	MPC · JPL
316671	1995 RN	—	September 1, 1995	Haleakala	AMOS	·	2.6 km	MPC · JPL
316672	1995 SD_{20}	—	September 18, 1995	Kitt Peak	Spacewatch	(5)	1.3 km	MPC · JPL
316673	1995 ST_{22}	—	September 19, 1995	Kitt Peak	Spacewatch	·	1.1 km	MPC · JPL
316674	1995 SH_{25}	—	September 19, 1995	Kitt Peak	Spacewatch	KOR	2.0 km	MPC · JPL
316675	1995 SO_{48}	—	September 26, 1995	Kitt Peak	Spacewatch	·	1.8 km	MPC · JPL
316676	1995 SM_{63}	—	September 25, 1995	Kitt Peak	Spacewatch	·	1.2 km	MPC · JPL
316677	1995 TU_{11}	—	October 15, 1995	Kitt Peak	Spacewatch	·	2.5 km	MPC · JPL
316678	1995 UO_{12}	—	October 17, 1995	Kitt Peak	Spacewatch	·	1.2 km	MPC · JPL
316679	1995 UD_{16}	—	October 17, 1995	Kitt Peak	Spacewatch	·	2.0 km	MPC · JPL
316680	1995 UM_{20}	—	October 19, 1995	Kitt Peak	Spacewatch	KOR	1.4 km	MPC · JPL
316681	1995 UO_{58}	—	October 17, 1995	Kitt Peak	Spacewatch	·	1.0 km	MPC · JPL
316682	1995 US_{61}	—	October 24, 1995	Kitt Peak	Spacewatch	·	800 m	MPC · JPL
316683	1995 UJ_{80}	—	October 19, 1995	Kitt Peak	Spacewatch	·	1.2 km	MPC · JPL
316684	1995 VT_{11}	—	November 15, 1995	Kitt Peak	Spacewatch	·	1.2 km	MPC · JPL
316685	1996 AS_{10}	—	January 13, 1996	Kitt Peak	Spacewatch	·	2.0 km	MPC · JPL
316686	1996 BX_{9}	—	January 21, 1996	Kitt Peak	Spacewatch	WIT	1.1 km	MPC · JPL
316687	1996 BX_{12}	—	January 27, 1996	Kitt Peak	Spacewatch	·	1.1 km	MPC · JPL
316688	1996 BE_{14}	—	January 16, 1996	Kitt Peak	Spacewatch	·	3.1 km	MPC · JPL
316689	1996 EX_{5}	—	March 11, 1996	Kitt Peak	Spacewatch	·	2.5 km	MPC · JPL
316690	1996 EA_{8}	—	March 11, 1996	Kitt Peak	Spacewatch	·	2.0 km	MPC · JPL
316691	1996 GQ_{5}	—	April 11, 1996	Kitt Peak	Spacewatch	·	720 m	MPC · JPL
316692	1996 GX_{5}	—	April 11, 1996	Kitt Peak	Spacewatch	L5	10 km	MPC · JPL
316693	1996 JU_{4}	—	May 10, 1996	Kitt Peak	Spacewatch	L5	10 km	MPC · JPL
316694	1996 TW_{1}	—	October 3, 1996	Xinglong	SCAP	·	1.7 km	MPC · JPL
316695	1996 TE_{9}	—	October 13, 1996	Haleakala	NEAT	AMO	580 m	MPC · JPL
316696	1996 TG_{17}	—	October 4, 1996	Kitt Peak	Spacewatch	·	2.0 km	MPC · JPL
316697	1996 TE_{26}	—	October 7, 1996	Kitt Peak	Spacewatch	·	3.4 km	MPC · JPL
316698	1996 TF_{30}	—	October 7, 1996	Kitt Peak	Spacewatch	·	1.1 km	MPC · JPL
316699	1996 TR_{46}	—	October 10, 1996	Kitt Peak	Spacewatch	·	2.5 km	MPC · JPL
316700	1996 VQ_{9}	—	November 3, 1996	Kitt Peak	Spacewatch	·	2.2 km	MPC · JPL

== 316701–316800 ==
back to top

Designation			Discovery			Properties		Ref
Permanent	Provisional	Named after	Date	Site	Discoverer(s)	Category	Diam.	Ref
316701	1996 VQ_{14}	—	November 5, 1996	Kitt Peak	Spacewatch	MAS	620 m	MPC · JPL
316702	1996 VH_{18}	—	November 6, 1996	Kitt Peak	Spacewatch	·	1.4 km	MPC · JPL
316703	1996 VF_{26}	—	November 10, 1996	Kitt Peak	Spacewatch	·	1.5 km	MPC · JPL
316704	1996 XT_{3}	—	December 2, 1996	Kitt Peak	Spacewatch	H	800 m	MPC · JPL
316705	1996 XA_{16}	—	December 4, 1996	Kitt Peak	Spacewatch	V	650 m	MPC · JPL
316706	1996 XA_{20}	—	December 12, 1996	Prescott	P. G. Comba	NYS	1.2 km	MPC · JPL
316707	1997 CP_{11}	—	February 3, 1997	Kitt Peak	Spacewatch	·	1.2 km	MPC · JPL
316708	1997 EU_{26}	—	March 4, 1997	Kitt Peak	Spacewatch	·	1.4 km	MPC · JPL
316709 POSS	1997 EE_{60}	POSS	March 6, 1997	Palomar	Lowe, A.	·	2.4 km	MPC · JPL
316710	1997 GQ_{2}	—	April 7, 1997	Kitt Peak	Spacewatch	NYS	1.4 km	MPC · JPL
316711	1997 GA_{5}	—	April 7, 1997	Kitt Peak	Spacewatch	H	530 m	MPC · JPL
316712	1997 SD_{3}	—	September 25, 1997	Farra d'Isonzo	Farra d'Isonzo	·	1.7 km	MPC · JPL
316713	1997 SA_{8}	—	September 23, 1997	Kitt Peak	Spacewatch	·	1.3 km	MPC · JPL
316714	1997 SB_{13}	—	September 28, 1997	Kitt Peak	Spacewatch	·	730 m	MPC · JPL
316715	1997 TO_{20}	—	October 3, 1997	Kitt Peak	Spacewatch	·	1.3 km	MPC · JPL
316716	1997 WS_{6}	—	November 23, 1997	Kitt Peak	Spacewatch	·	960 m	MPC · JPL
316717	1997 WN_{20}	—	November 25, 1997	Kitt Peak	Spacewatch	·	1.5 km	MPC · JPL
316718	1997 XM_{3}	—	December 3, 1997	Caussols	ODAS	(5)	2.2 km	MPC · JPL
316719	1997 YY_{13}	—	December 31, 1997	Oizumi	T. Kobayashi	·	2.5 km	MPC · JPL
316720	1998 BE_{7}	—	January 24, 1998	Haleakala	NEAT	T_{j} (2.97)	6.0 km	MPC · JPL
316721	1998 BB_{20}	—	January 22, 1998	Kitt Peak	Spacewatch	·	1.6 km	MPC · JPL
316722	1998 DQ_{17}	—	February 23, 1998	Kitt Peak	Spacewatch	·	1.2 km	MPC · JPL
316723	1998 DV_{21}	—	February 22, 1998	Kitt Peak	Spacewatch	·	1.8 km	MPC · JPL
316724	1998 FX_{132}	—	March 20, 1998	Socorro	LINEAR	PHO	1.6 km	MPC · JPL
316725	1998 HC_{4}	—	April 19, 1998	Kitt Peak	Spacewatch	V	820 m	MPC · JPL
316726	1998 HA_{7}	—	April 23, 1998	Socorro	LINEAR	PHO	1.2 km	MPC · JPL
316727	1998 QF_{58}	—	August 30, 1998	Kitt Peak	Spacewatch	VER	2.9 km	MPC · JPL
316728	1998 QB_{60}	—	August 26, 1998	Kitt Peak	Spacewatch	EOS	2.3 km	MPC · JPL
316729	1998 QU_{94}	—	August 19, 1998	Socorro	LINEAR	·	2.3 km	MPC · JPL
316730	1998 RW_{2}	—	September 13, 1998	Kitt Peak	Spacewatch	·	780 m	MPC · JPL
316731	1998 RG_{81}	—	September 14, 1998	Kitt Peak	Spacewatch	·	2.9 km	MPC · JPL
316732	1998 SY_{20}	—	September 21, 1998	Kitt Peak	Spacewatch	·	1.5 km	MPC · JPL
316733	1998 ST_{120}	—	September 26, 1998	Socorro	LINEAR	EMA	3.9 km	MPC · JPL
316734	1998 SE_{125}	—	September 26, 1998	Socorro	LINEAR	·	1.4 km	MPC · JPL
316735	1998 SR_{166}	—	September 21, 1998	Anderson Mesa	LONEOS	·	1.8 km	MPC · JPL
316736	1998 UJ_{9}	—	October 16, 1998	Kitt Peak	Spacewatch	·	4.0 km	MPC · JPL
316737	1998 UW_{9}	—	October 16, 1998	Kitt Peak	Spacewatch	·	3.7 km	MPC · JPL
316738	1998 WB_{35}	—	November 18, 1998	Kitt Peak	Spacewatch	·	1.8 km	MPC · JPL
316739	1998 WM_{38}	—	November 21, 1998	Kitt Peak	Spacewatch	AGN	1.4 km	MPC · JPL
316740	1998 WG_{39}	—	November 15, 1998	Kitt Peak	Spacewatch	·	2.1 km	MPC · JPL
316741 Janefletcher	1998 WS_{44}	Janefletcher	November 17, 1998	La Palma	A. Fitzsimmons	·	5.3 km	MPC · JPL
316742	1998 XQ_{7}	—	December 8, 1998	Kitt Peak	Spacewatch	·	2.9 km	MPC · JPL
316743	1999 AQ_{7}	—	January 13, 1999	Socorro	LINEAR	·	2.7 km	MPC · JPL
316744	1999 AC_{31}	—	January 14, 1999	Kitt Peak	Spacewatch	·	1.3 km	MPC · JPL
316745	1999 CM_{134}	—	February 7, 1999	Kitt Peak	Spacewatch	·	2.5 km	MPC · JPL
316746	1999 FT_{81}	—	March 20, 1999	Apache Point	SDSS	·	850 m	MPC · JPL
316747	1999 FC_{88}	—	May 9, 2005	Mount Lemmon	Mount Lemmon Survey	·	2.4 km	MPC · JPL
316748	1999 GV_{62}	—	April 12, 1999	Kitt Peak	Spacewatch	·	1.7 km	MPC · JPL
316749	1999 JQ_{7}	—	May 8, 1999	Catalina	CSS	·	2.5 km	MPC · JPL
316750	1999 JG_{47}	—	May 10, 1999	Socorro	LINEAR	·	2.1 km	MPC · JPL
316751	1999 JH_{91}	—	May 12, 1999	Socorro	LINEAR	·	2.4 km	MPC · JPL
316752	1999 QV_{2}	—	August 21, 1999	Kitt Peak	Spacewatch	·	470 m	MPC · JPL
316753	1999 RR_{7}	—	September 3, 1999	Kitt Peak	Spacewatch	EOS	2.4 km	MPC · JPL
316754	1999 RN_{17}	—	September 7, 1999	Socorro	LINEAR	·	1.3 km	MPC · JPL
316755	1999 RZ_{35}	—	September 12, 1999	Prescott	P. G. Comba	·	1.7 km	MPC · JPL
316756	1999 RW_{44}	—	September 13, 1999	Promiod	Sala, G. A.	·	990 m	MPC · JPL
316757	1999 RK_{219}	—	September 6, 1999	Kitt Peak	Spacewatch	·	1.3 km	MPC · JPL
316758	1999 RY_{246}	—	September 4, 1999	Catalina	CSS	·	2.8 km	MPC · JPL
316759	1999 SV_{3}	—	September 29, 1999	Socorro	LINEAR	·	5.2 km	MPC · JPL
316760	1999 SJ_{19}	—	September 30, 1999	Catalina	CSS	H	750 m	MPC · JPL
316761	1999 TB_{23}	—	October 3, 1999	Kitt Peak	Spacewatch	NAE	2.6 km	MPC · JPL
316762	1999 TK_{33}	—	October 4, 1999	Socorro	LINEAR	V	1.1 km	MPC · JPL
316763	1999 TG_{41}	—	October 2, 1999	Kitt Peak	Spacewatch	THB	3.0 km	MPC · JPL
316764	1999 TG_{44}	—	October 3, 1999	Kitt Peak	Spacewatch	·	1.3 km	MPC · JPL
316765	1999 TY_{44}	—	October 3, 1999	Kitt Peak	Spacewatch	·	3.3 km	MPC · JPL
316766	1999 TW_{45}	—	October 3, 1999	Kitt Peak	Spacewatch	·	1.2 km	MPC · JPL
316767	1999 TZ_{48}	—	October 4, 1999	Kitt Peak	Spacewatch	HYG	2.3 km	MPC · JPL
316768	1999 TN_{49}	—	October 4, 1999	Kitt Peak	Spacewatch	·	1.4 km	MPC · JPL
316769	1999 TD_{52}	—	October 4, 1999	Kitt Peak	Spacewatch	·	2.5 km	MPC · JPL
316770	1999 TH_{52}	—	October 4, 1999	Kitt Peak	Spacewatch	NYS	1.2 km	MPC · JPL
316771	1999 TT_{53}	—	October 6, 1999	Kitt Peak	Spacewatch	CLA	1.6 km	MPC · JPL
316772	1999 TR_{72}	—	October 9, 1999	Kitt Peak	Spacewatch	·	2.9 km	MPC · JPL
316773	1999 TB_{74}	—	October 10, 1999	Kitt Peak	Spacewatch	NYS	1.2 km	MPC · JPL
316774	1999 TG_{79}	—	October 11, 1999	Kitt Peak	Spacewatch	·	3.0 km	MPC · JPL
316775	1999 TU_{123}	—	October 15, 1999	Socorro	LINEAR	MAS	980 m	MPC · JPL
316776	1999 TH_{134}	—	October 6, 1999	Socorro	LINEAR	·	2.8 km	MPC · JPL
316777	1999 TB_{137}	—	September 30, 1999	Catalina	CSS	·	3.3 km	MPC · JPL
316778	1999 TT_{139}	—	October 6, 1999	Socorro	LINEAR	EOS	2.5 km	MPC · JPL
316779	1999 TP_{141}	—	October 6, 1999	Socorro	LINEAR	NYS	1.2 km	MPC · JPL
316780	1999 TU_{148}	—	October 7, 1999	Socorro	LINEAR	MAS	1.1 km	MPC · JPL
316781	1999 TJ_{150}	—	October 7, 1999	Socorro	LINEAR	·	730 m	MPC · JPL
316782	1999 TL_{153}	—	October 7, 1999	Socorro	LINEAR	PHO	1.2 km	MPC · JPL
316783	1999 TM_{154}	—	October 7, 1999	Socorro	LINEAR	·	1.1 km	MPC · JPL
316784	1999 TV_{160}	—	October 9, 1999	Socorro	LINEAR	·	3.0 km	MPC · JPL
316785	1999 TA_{166}	—	October 10, 1999	Socorro	LINEAR	·	1.8 km	MPC · JPL
316786	1999 TV_{170}	—	October 10, 1999	Socorro	LINEAR	TIR	3.5 km	MPC · JPL
316787	1999 TA_{172}	—	October 10, 1999	Socorro	LINEAR	·	3.3 km	MPC · JPL
316788	1999 TP_{173}	—	October 10, 1999	Socorro	LINEAR	·	1.0 km	MPC · JPL
316789	1999 TW_{179}	—	October 10, 1999	Socorro	LINEAR	·	2.9 km	MPC · JPL
316790	1999 TS_{197}	—	October 12, 1999	Socorro	LINEAR	·	3.1 km	MPC · JPL
316791	1999 TS_{201}	—	October 13, 1999	Socorro	LINEAR	NYS	1.7 km	MPC · JPL
316792	1999 TU_{229}	—	October 6, 1999	Socorro	LINEAR	·	2.0 km	MPC · JPL
316793	1999 TM_{237}	—	October 4, 1999	Kitt Peak	Spacewatch	·	1.2 km	MPC · JPL
316794	1999 TU_{237}	—	October 4, 1999	Kitt Peak	Spacewatch	·	1.3 km	MPC · JPL
316795	1999 TK_{243}	—	October 6, 1999	Socorro	LINEAR	·	2.4 km	MPC · JPL
316796	1999 TW_{253}	—	October 11, 1999	Kitt Peak	Spacewatch	·	1.6 km	MPC · JPL
316797	1999 TE_{259}	—	October 9, 1999	Socorro	LINEAR	·	6.0 km	MPC · JPL
316798	1999 TL_{300}	—	October 3, 1999	Kitt Peak	Spacewatch	·	2.8 km	MPC · JPL
316799	1999 US_{15}	—	October 29, 1999	Catalina	CSS	·	2.2 km	MPC · JPL
316800	1999 UM_{27}	—	October 30, 1999	Kitt Peak	Spacewatch	V	730 m	MPC · JPL

== 316801–316900 ==
back to top

Designation			Discovery			Properties		Ref
Permanent	Provisional	Named after	Date	Site	Discoverer(s)	Category	Diam.	Ref
316801	1999 UB_{29}	—	October 31, 1999	Kitt Peak	Spacewatch	·	2.6 km	MPC · JPL
316802	1999 UA_{32}	—	October 31, 1999	Kitt Peak	Spacewatch	EOS	2.6 km	MPC · JPL
316803	1999 UK_{33}	—	October 31, 1999	Kitt Peak	Spacewatch	·	3.2 km	MPC · JPL
316804	1999 UF_{35}	—	October 31, 1999	Kitt Peak	Spacewatch	·	2.5 km	MPC · JPL
316805	1999 VB_{63}	—	November 4, 1999	Socorro	LINEAR	NYS	1.3 km	MPC · JPL
316806	1999 VL_{73}	—	November 1, 1999	Kitt Peak	Spacewatch	·	1.5 km	MPC · JPL
316807	1999 VK_{99}	—	November 9, 1999	Socorro	LINEAR	·	2.3 km	MPC · JPL
316808	1999 VX_{99}	—	November 9, 1999	Socorro	LINEAR	·	1.5 km	MPC · JPL
316809	1999 VQ_{106}	—	November 9, 1999	Socorro	LINEAR	·	3.5 km	MPC · JPL
316810	1999 VE_{109}	—	November 9, 1999	Socorro	LINEAR	·	4.0 km	MPC · JPL
316811	1999 VF_{121}	—	November 4, 1999	Kitt Peak	Spacewatch	·	1.6 km	MPC · JPL
316812	1999 VY_{129}	—	November 11, 1999	Kitt Peak	Spacewatch	·	3.4 km	MPC · JPL
316813	1999 VT_{161}	—	November 14, 1999	Socorro	LINEAR	·	1.3 km	MPC · JPL
316814	1999 VC_{165}	—	November 14, 1999	Socorro	LINEAR	·	2.3 km	MPC · JPL
316815	1999 VO_{167}	—	November 14, 1999	Socorro	LINEAR	·	1.6 km	MPC · JPL
316816	1999 VH_{206}	—	October 6, 1999	Socorro	LINEAR	·	3.3 km	MPC · JPL
316817	1999 VO_{207}	—	November 12, 1999	Socorro	LINEAR	·	3.0 km	MPC · JPL
316818	1999 VG_{209}	—	November 14, 1999	Socorro	LINEAR	AGN	1.6 km	MPC · JPL
316819	1999 VR_{215}	—	November 3, 1999	Socorro	LINEAR	LIX	3.5 km	MPC · JPL
316820	1999 VY_{215}	—	November 1, 1999	Kitt Peak	Spacewatch	·	2.5 km	MPC · JPL
316821	1999 VW_{217}	—	October 6, 1999	Socorro	LINEAR	·	3.1 km	MPC · JPL
316822	1999 WS_{15}	—	November 29, 1999	Kitt Peak	Spacewatch	·	2.3 km	MPC · JPL
316823	1999 WS_{25}	—	November 29, 1999	Kitt Peak	Spacewatch	·	1.2 km	MPC · JPL
316824	1999 XK_{65}	—	December 7, 1999	Socorro	LINEAR	·	1.6 km	MPC · JPL
316825	1999 XG_{149}	—	December 8, 1999	Kitt Peak	Spacewatch	·	1.1 km	MPC · JPL
316826	1999 XJ_{152}	—	December 8, 1999	Kitt Peak	Spacewatch	EOS	2.7 km	MPC · JPL
316827	1999 XL_{225}	—	December 13, 1999	Kitt Peak	Spacewatch	·	950 m	MPC · JPL
316828	1999 XZ_{236}	—	December 5, 1999	Catalina	CSS	TIR	4.0 km	MPC · JPL
316829	1999 YS	—	December 16, 1999	Socorro	LINEAR	·	4.4 km	MPC · JPL
316830	2000 AS_{146}	—	January 7, 2000	Socorro	LINEAR	T_{j} (2.99)	5.8 km	MPC · JPL
316831	2000 BP_{9}	—	January 26, 2000	Kitt Peak	Spacewatch	·	2.9 km	MPC · JPL
316832	2000 BM_{20}	—	January 26, 2000	Kitt Peak	Spacewatch	·	2.2 km	MPC · JPL
316833	2000 BC_{52}	—	January 27, 2000	Kitt Peak	Spacewatch	L4	9.2 km	MPC · JPL
316834	2000 CO_{74}	—	February 8, 2000	Kitt Peak	Spacewatch	THM	2.6 km	MPC · JPL
316835	2000 CB_{101}	—	January 28, 2000	Kitt Peak	Spacewatch	L4	10 km	MPC · JPL
316836	2000 CQ_{132}	—	February 4, 2000	Kitt Peak	Spacewatch	·	2.0 km	MPC · JPL
316837	2000 CW_{140}	—	February 6, 2000	Kitt Peak	Spacewatch	·	750 m	MPC · JPL
316838	2000 CF_{142}	—	February 3, 2000	Kitt Peak	Spacewatch	KOR	1.6 km	MPC · JPL
316839	2000 DS_{9}	—	February 26, 2000	Kitt Peak	Spacewatch	KOR	1.6 km	MPC · JPL
316840	2000 DB_{12}	—	February 27, 2000	Kitt Peak	Spacewatch	·	2.0 km	MPC · JPL
316841	2000 DA_{90}	—	February 27, 2000	Kitt Peak	Spacewatch	·	1.1 km	MPC · JPL
316842	2000 ER_{99}	—	March 12, 2000	Kitt Peak	Spacewatch	·	2.0 km	MPC · JPL
316843	2000 EW_{123}	—	March 11, 2000	Anderson Mesa	LONEOS	·	1.4 km	MPC · JPL
316844	2000 EP_{170}	—	March 5, 2000	Socorro	LINEAR	·	1.2 km	MPC · JPL
316845	2000 FG_{2}	—	March 25, 2000	Kitt Peak	Spacewatch	·	740 m	MPC · JPL
316846	2000 FZ_{72}	—	March 26, 2000	Anderson Mesa	LONEOS	BRG	2.0 km	MPC · JPL
316847	2000 GQ_{9}	—	April 5, 2000	Socorro	LINEAR	NYS	1.4 km	MPC · JPL
316848	2000 GW_{19}	—	April 5, 2000	Socorro	LINEAR	·	1.1 km	MPC · JPL
316849	2000 GH_{47}	—	April 5, 2000	Socorro	LINEAR	·	1.7 km	MPC · JPL
316850	2000 GS_{120}	—	April 5, 2000	Kitt Peak	Spacewatch	·	2.3 km	MPC · JPL
316851	2000 GT_{130}	—	April 6, 2000	Kitt Peak	Spacewatch	·	2.2 km	MPC · JPL
316852	2000 GH_{145}	—	April 10, 2000	Kitt Peak	Spacewatch	·	1.4 km	MPC · JPL
316853	2000 HJ_{8}	—	April 27, 2000	Socorro	LINEAR	·	1.7 km	MPC · JPL
316854	2000 HA_{83}	—	April 29, 2000	Socorro	LINEAR	·	1.5 km	MPC · JPL
316855	2000 JK_{72}	—	May 1, 2000	Kitt Peak	Spacewatch	·	5.8 km	MPC · JPL
316856	2000 JU_{78}	—	May 4, 2000	Kitt Peak	Spacewatch	MAR	1.3 km	MPC · JPL
316857	2000 NH_{10}	—	July 6, 2000	Anderson Mesa	LONEOS	·	1 km	MPC · JPL
316858	2000 PW_{6}	—	August 4, 2000	Socorro	LINEAR	H	730 m	MPC · JPL
316859	2000 QN_{4}	—	August 24, 2000	Socorro	LINEAR	·	3.2 km	MPC · JPL
316860	2000 QX_{17}	—	August 24, 2000	Socorro	LINEAR	·	2.7 km	MPC · JPL
316861	2000 QA_{43}	—	August 24, 2000	Socorro	LINEAR	EUN	1.8 km	MPC · JPL
316862	2000 QV_{56}	—	August 26, 2000	Socorro	LINEAR	·	2.5 km	MPC · JPL
316863	2000 QF_{70}	—	August 26, 2000	Socorro	LINEAR	H	780 m	MPC · JPL
316864	2000 QB_{81}	—	August 24, 2000	Socorro	LINEAR	·	930 m	MPC · JPL
316865	2000 QT_{113}	—	August 24, 2000	Socorro	LINEAR	NYS	1.4 km	MPC · JPL
316866	2000 QD_{124}	—	August 26, 2000	Socorro	LINEAR	·	970 m	MPC · JPL
316867	2000 QH_{144}	—	August 31, 2000	Socorro	LINEAR	·	960 m	MPC · JPL
316868	2000 QY_{147}	—	August 31, 2000	Socorro	LINEAR	H	760 m	MPC · JPL
316869	2000 QW_{153}	—	August 29, 2000	Socorro	LINEAR	·	1.7 km	MPC · JPL
316870	2000 QE_{174}	—	August 31, 2000	Socorro	LINEAR	·	920 m	MPC · JPL
316871	2000 QD_{180}	—	August 31, 2000	Socorro	LINEAR	H	750 m	MPC · JPL
316872	2000 QO_{192}	—	August 26, 2000	Socorro	LINEAR	·	2.9 km	MPC · JPL
316873	2000 QU_{223}	—	August 24, 2000	Socorro	LINEAR	·	2.8 km	MPC · JPL
316874	2000 QP_{254}	—	August 31, 2000	Socorro	LINEAR	·	990 m	MPC · JPL
316875	2000 RU_{26}	—	September 1, 2000	Socorro	LINEAR	·	2.0 km	MPC · JPL
316876	2000 RF_{43}	—	September 3, 2000	Socorro	LINEAR	·	3.3 km	MPC · JPL
316877	2000 RY_{70}	—	September 2, 2000	Socorro	LINEAR	·	1.8 km	MPC · JPL
316878	2000 RF_{91}	—	September 3, 2000	Socorro	LINEAR	·	2.0 km	MPC · JPL
316879	2000 RS_{96}	—	September 4, 2000	Anderson Mesa	LONEOS	·	950 m	MPC · JPL
316880	2000 RM_{107}	—	September 3, 2000	Apache Point	SDSS	KOR	1.9 km	MPC · JPL
316881	2000 SB_{17}	—	September 23, 2000	Socorro	LINEAR	·	2.1 km	MPC · JPL
316882	2000 SC_{19}	—	September 23, 2000	Socorro	LINEAR	·	2.6 km	MPC · JPL
316883	2000 SA_{24}	—	September 24, 2000	Socorro	LINEAR	·	2.7 km	MPC · JPL
316884	2000 SL_{24}	—	September 26, 2000	Socorro	LINEAR	H	750 m	MPC · JPL
316885	2000 SO_{28}	—	September 23, 2000	Socorro	LINEAR	·	2.0 km	MPC · JPL
316886	2000 SZ_{31}	—	September 24, 2000	Socorro	LINEAR	·	1.5 km	MPC · JPL
316887	2000 SZ_{41}	—	September 24, 2000	Socorro	LINEAR	DOR	2.9 km	MPC · JPL
316888	2000 SG_{48}	—	September 23, 2000	Socorro	LINEAR	·	3.7 km	MPC · JPL
316889	2000 SF_{54}	—	September 24, 2000	Socorro	LINEAR	·	1.6 km	MPC · JPL
316890	2000 SY_{57}	—	September 24, 2000	Socorro	LINEAR	·	1.1 km	MPC · JPL
316891	2000 SN_{80}	—	September 24, 2000	Socorro	LINEAR	NYS	1.5 km	MPC · JPL
316892	2000 SJ_{93}	—	September 23, 2000	Socorro	LINEAR	·	2.9 km	MPC · JPL
316893	2000 SD_{100}	—	September 23, 2000	Socorro	LINEAR	·	1.9 km	MPC · JPL
316894	2000 SV_{135}	—	September 23, 2000	Socorro	LINEAR	·	2.4 km	MPC · JPL
316895	2000 SW_{138}	—	September 23, 2000	Socorro	LINEAR	·	2.6 km	MPC · JPL
316896	2000 SY_{140}	—	September 23, 2000	Socorro	LINEAR	·	2.6 km	MPC · JPL
316897	2000 SR_{190}	—	September 23, 2000	Kitt Peak	Spacewatch	·	2.4 km	MPC · JPL
316898	2000 SN_{195}	—	September 24, 2000	Socorro	LINEAR	·	2.8 km	MPC · JPL
316899	2000 SP_{214}	—	September 26, 2000	Socorro	LINEAR	·	2.5 km	MPC · JPL
316900	2000 SQ_{227}	—	September 27, 2000	Socorro	LINEAR	H	870 m	MPC · JPL

== 316901–317000 ==
back to top

Designation			Discovery			Properties		Ref
Permanent	Provisional	Named after	Date	Site	Discoverer(s)	Category	Diam.	Ref
316901	2000 SV_{227}	—	September 28, 2000	Socorro	LINEAR	·	960 m	MPC · JPL
316902	2000 SW_{282}	—	September 23, 2000	Socorro	LINEAR	·	3.1 km	MPC · JPL
316903	2000 SD_{289}	—	September 27, 2000	Socorro	LINEAR	·	820 m	MPC · JPL
316904	2000 SC_{290}	—	September 27, 2000	Socorro	LINEAR	·	950 m	MPC · JPL
316905	2000 SO_{362}	—	September 19, 2000	Haleakala	NEAT	·	830 m	MPC · JPL
316906	2000 TJ_{2}	—	October 2, 2000	Anza	M. Collins, Sipe, R.	·	3.3 km	MPC · JPL
316907	2000 TJ_{20}	—	October 1, 2000	Socorro	LINEAR	·	1.2 km	MPC · JPL
316908	2000 TG_{27}	—	September 24, 2000	Socorro	LINEAR	·	890 m	MPC · JPL
316909	2000 TK_{54}	—	October 1, 2000	Socorro	LINEAR	·	1 km	MPC · JPL
316910	2000 UY_{17}	—	October 24, 2000	Socorro	LINEAR	(5)	1.6 km	MPC · JPL
316911	2000 UN_{19}	—	October 25, 2000	Socorro	LINEAR	·	1.8 km	MPC · JPL
316912	2000 UG_{23}	—	October 24, 2000	Socorro	LINEAR	·	1.1 km	MPC · JPL
316913	2000 UY_{55}	—	October 24, 2000	Socorro	LINEAR	·	3.7 km	MPC · JPL
316914	2000 UT_{64}	—	October 25, 2000	Socorro	LINEAR	·	760 m	MPC · JPL
316915	2000 UG_{107}	—	October 30, 2000	Socorro	LINEAR	·	990 m	MPC · JPL
316916	2000 VB_{9}	—	November 1, 2000	Socorro	LINEAR	·	1 km	MPC · JPL
316917	2000 VL_{21}	—	November 1, 2000	Socorro	LINEAR	V	1.0 km	MPC · JPL
316918	2000 WZ_{17}	—	November 21, 2000	Socorro	LINEAR	·	1.0 km	MPC · JPL
316919	2000 WK_{22}	—	November 20, 2000	Socorro	LINEAR	·	2.6 km	MPC · JPL
316920	2000 WW_{75}	—	November 20, 2000	Socorro	LINEAR	·	870 m	MPC · JPL
316921	2000 WA_{104}	—	November 27, 2000	Socorro	LINEAR	·	1.9 km	MPC · JPL
316922	2000 WB_{165}	—	November 22, 2000	Haleakala	NEAT	·	4.7 km	MPC · JPL
316923	2000 XC_{46}	—	December 15, 2000	Socorro	LINEAR	PHO	1.4 km	MPC · JPL
316924	2000 YB_{5}	—	December 19, 2000	Socorro	LINEAR	·	1.7 km	MPC · JPL
316925	2000 YD_{34}	—	December 28, 2000	Socorro	LINEAR	·	1.9 km	MPC · JPL
316926	2000 YV_{44}	—	December 30, 2000	Socorro	LINEAR	·	1.9 km	MPC · JPL
316927	2000 YF_{45}	—	December 30, 2000	Socorro	LINEAR	PHO	1.5 km	MPC · JPL
316928	2000 YN_{51}	—	December 30, 2000	Socorro	LINEAR	·	2.1 km	MPC · JPL
316929	2000 YC_{92}	—	December 30, 2000	Socorro	LINEAR	·	2.9 km	MPC · JPL
316930	2000 YK_{96}	—	December 30, 2000	Socorro	LINEAR	·	3.1 km	MPC · JPL
316931	2001 AE	—	January 1, 2001	Kitt Peak	Spacewatch	·	2.9 km	MPC · JPL
316932	2001 AA_{13}	—	January 2, 2001	Socorro	LINEAR	·	1.6 km	MPC · JPL
316933	2001 AV_{50}	—	January 15, 2001	Kitt Peak	Spacewatch	EOS	3.0 km	MPC · JPL
316934	2001 AA_{52}	—	January 5, 2001	Socorro	LINEAR	·	1.4 km	MPC · JPL
316935	2001 BO_{5}	—	January 19, 2001	Socorro	LINEAR	H	680 m	MPC · JPL
316936	2001 BT_{12}	—	January 21, 2001	Kitt Peak	Spacewatch	·	1.7 km	MPC · JPL
316937	2001 BO_{83}	—	January 26, 2001	Kitt Peak	Spacewatch	MAS	690 m	MPC · JPL
316938	2001 CC_{20}	—	February 3, 2001	Socorro	LINEAR	H	650 m	MPC · JPL
316939	2001 CW_{20}	—	February 4, 2001	Socorro	LINEAR	PHO	1.6 km	MPC · JPL
316940	2001 CH_{33}	—	February 13, 2001	Socorro	LINEAR	T_{j} (2.99) · EUP	4.9 km	MPC · JPL
316941	2001 CY_{45}	—	February 15, 2001	Socorro	LINEAR	·	4.7 km	MPC · JPL
316942	2001 CF_{49}	—	February 1, 2001	Anderson Mesa	LONEOS	·	2.9 km	MPC · JPL
316943	2001 DW_{1}	—	February 16, 2001	Kitt Peak	Spacewatch	·	1.8 km	MPC · JPL
316944	2001 DQ_{5}	—	February 16, 2001	Socorro	LINEAR	·	1.5 km	MPC · JPL
316945	2001 DF_{8}	—	February 17, 2001	Kitt Peak	Spacewatch	·	3.0 km	MPC · JPL
316946	2001 DK_{15}	—	February 16, 2001	Socorro	LINEAR	·	1.4 km	MPC · JPL
316947	2001 DN_{15}	—	February 16, 2001	Socorro	LINEAR	·	1.2 km	MPC · JPL
316948	2001 DP_{15}	—	February 16, 2001	Socorro	LINEAR	EUP	4.4 km	MPC · JPL
316949	2001 DW_{20}	—	February 16, 2001	Socorro	LINEAR	·	4.6 km	MPC · JPL
316950	2001 DT_{34}	—	January 3, 2001	Socorro	LINEAR	·	1.5 km	MPC · JPL
316951	2001 DB_{48}	—	February 21, 2001	Kitt Peak	Spacewatch	EOS	2.6 km	MPC · JPL
316952	2001 DS_{60}	—	February 19, 2001	Socorro	LINEAR	EOS	3.0 km	MPC · JPL
316953	2001 DX_{80}	—	February 22, 2001	Nogales	Tenagra II	EOS	3.1 km	MPC · JPL
316954	2001 DS_{81}	—	February 21, 2001	Kitt Peak	Spacewatch	EOS	2.1 km	MPC · JPL
316955	2001 DH_{87}	—	February 27, 2001	Kitt Peak	Spacewatch	·	4.3 km	MPC · JPL
316956	2001 DK_{90}	—	February 22, 2001	Kitt Peak	Spacewatch	NYS	1.1 km	MPC · JPL
316957	2001 EN_{22}	—	March 15, 2001	Kitt Peak	Spacewatch	·	1.4 km	MPC · JPL
316958	2001 FG_{1}	—	March 18, 2001	Junk Bond	D. Healy	·	2.4 km	MPC · JPL
316959	2001 FA_{20}	—	March 19, 2001	Anderson Mesa	LONEOS	·	1.5 km	MPC · JPL
316960	2001 FU_{27}	—	March 18, 2001	Socorro	LINEAR	·	2.0 km	MPC · JPL
316961	2001 FM_{30}	—	March 21, 2001	Haleakala	NEAT	·	3.6 km	MPC · JPL
316962	2001 FY_{56}	—	March 21, 2001	Anderson Mesa	LONEOS	T_{j} (2.99)	5.7 km	MPC · JPL
316963	2001 FD_{57}	—	March 21, 2001	Haleakala	NEAT	·	4.1 km	MPC · JPL
316964	2001 FD_{71}	—	March 19, 2001	Socorro	LINEAR	·	4.1 km	MPC · JPL
316965	2001 FE_{71}	—	March 19, 2001	Socorro	LINEAR	·	3.9 km	MPC · JPL
316966	2001 FY_{73}	—	March 19, 2001	Socorro	LINEAR	·	4.0 km	MPC · JPL
316967	2001 FZ_{80}	—	March 23, 2001	Socorro	LINEAR	·	1.3 km	MPC · JPL
316968	2001 FR_{81}	—	March 23, 2001	Socorro	LINEAR	TIR	4.0 km	MPC · JPL
316969	2001 FQ_{83}	—	March 26, 2001	Kitt Peak	Spacewatch	EOS	2.7 km	MPC · JPL
316970	2001 FT_{120}	—	March 26, 2001	Socorro	LINEAR	·	1.4 km	MPC · JPL
316971	2001 FL_{130}	—	March 29, 2001	Socorro	LINEAR	PHO	1.2 km	MPC · JPL
316972	2001 FV_{131}	—	March 20, 2001	Haleakala	NEAT	URS	4.4 km	MPC · JPL
316973	2001 FV_{140}	—	March 22, 2001	Kitt Peak	Spacewatch	V	720 m	MPC · JPL
316974	2001 FP_{147}	—	March 24, 2001	Anderson Mesa	LONEOS	·	3.3 km	MPC · JPL
316975	2001 FF_{154}	—	March 22, 2001	Cima Ekar	Cima Ekar	EOS	2.4 km	MPC · JPL
316976	2001 FH_{159}	—	March 29, 2001	Anderson Mesa	LONEOS	·	1.2 km	MPC · JPL
316977	2001 FV_{159}	—	March 29, 2001	Anderson Mesa	LONEOS	·	1.5 km	MPC · JPL
316978	2001 FY_{180}	—	March 20, 2001	Anderson Mesa	LONEOS	TIR	3.8 km	MPC · JPL
316979	2001 FK_{184}	—	March 26, 2001	Kitt Peak	M. W. Buie	EOS	1.9 km	MPC · JPL
316980	2001 GV_{3}	—	April 15, 2001	Socorro	LINEAR	·	5.7 km	MPC · JPL
316981	2001 GW_{11}	—	April 15, 2001	Socorro	LINEAR	·	5.7 km	MPC · JPL
316982	2001 HS_{13}	—	April 21, 2001	Socorro	LINEAR	EUP	4.7 km	MPC · JPL
316983	2001 HD_{57}	—	April 25, 2001	Anderson Mesa	LONEOS	H	920 m	MPC · JPL
316984	2001 JC	—	May 2, 2001	Socorro	LINEAR	·	1.6 km	MPC · JPL
316985	2001 KV_{63}	—	May 20, 2001	Haleakala	NEAT	T_{j} (2.95) · EUP	6.9 km	MPC · JPL
316986	2001 LJ	—	June 12, 2001	Kitt Peak	Spacewatch	T_{j} (2.9) · CYB	5.1 km	MPC · JPL
316987	2001 LU	—	June 12, 2001	Kitt Peak	Spacewatch	CYB	3.9 km	MPC · JPL
316988	2001 MN_{26}	—	June 15, 2001	Socorro	LINEAR	EUN	2.1 km	MPC · JPL
316989	2001 NL_{5}	—	July 13, 2001	Palomar	NEAT	·	2.4 km	MPC · JPL
316990	2001 NB_{11}	—	July 14, 2001	Haleakala	NEAT	·	2.4 km	MPC · JPL
316991	2001 OJ_{11}	—	July 17, 2001	Palomar	NEAT	·	2.0 km	MPC · JPL
316992	2001 OP_{19}	—	July 18, 2001	Palomar	NEAT	·	1.5 km	MPC · JPL
316993	2001 OQ_{63}	—	July 22, 2001	Palomar	NEAT	·	2.7 km	MPC · JPL
316994	2001 OB_{93}	—	July 24, 2001	Palomar	NEAT	·	1.5 km	MPC · JPL
316995	2001 OD_{111}	—	July 20, 2001	Palomar	NEAT	·	1.6 km	MPC · JPL
316996	2001 OK_{111}	—	July 25, 2001	Haleakala	NEAT	KON	3.2 km	MPC · JPL
316997	2001 OS_{111}	—	July 27, 2001	Anderson Mesa	LONEOS	·	2.9 km	MPC · JPL
316998	2001 PZ_{18}	—	August 10, 2001	Palomar	NEAT	·	1.7 km	MPC · JPL
316999	2001 PR_{21}	—	August 10, 2001	Haleakala	NEAT	·	990 m	MPC · JPL
317000 Simonepastore	2001 PY_{28}	Simonepastore	August 13, 2001	San Marcello	A. Boattini, M. Tombelli	JUN	1.6 km	MPC · JPL

back to top

== See also ==
- Meanings of minor-planet names: 316001–317000
