= Meanings of minor-planet names: 314001–315000 =

As minor planet discoveries are confirmed, they are given a permanent number by the IAU's Minor Planet Center (MPC), and the discoverers can then submit names for them, following the IAU's naming conventions. The list below concerns those minor planets in the specified number-range that have received names, and explains the meanings of those names.

Official naming citations of newly named small Solar System bodies are approved and published in a bulletin by IAU's Working Group for Small Bodies Nomenclature (WGSBN). Before May 2021, citations were published in MPC's Minor Planet Circulars for many decades. Recent citations can also be found on the JPL Small-Body Database (SBDB). Until his death in 2016, German astronomer Lutz D. Schmadel compiled these citations into the Dictionary of Minor Planet Names (DMP) and regularly updated the collection.

Based on Paul Herget's The Names of the Minor Planets, Schmadel also researched the unclear origin of numerous asteroids, most of which had been named prior to World War II. This article incorporates text from this source, which is in the public domain: SBDB New namings may only be added to this list below after official publication as the preannouncement of names is condemned. The WGSBN publishes a comprehensive guideline for the naming rules of non-cometary small Solar System bodies.

== 314001–314100 ==
Named minor planet	Provisional	This minor planet was named for...	Ref · Catalog
314040 Tavannes	2005 AU	Tavannes is a municipality of the Swiss canton of Bern.	JPL · 314040
314082 Dryope	2005 CZ_{36}	Dryope was the daughter of King Dryops.	JPL · 314082

== 314101–314200 ==
back to top

Named minor planet	Provisional	This minor planet was named for...	Ref · Catalog
314159 Mattparker	2005 FW_{1}	Matthew Thomas Parker (b. 1980), an Australian recreational mathematician, author, and science communicator based in the United Kingdom.	IAU · 314159
314163 Kittenberger	2005 GX	Kálmán Kittenberger (1881–1958), a Hungarian traveller, African researcher, zoologist, teacher, hunter and writer on natural history.	JPL · 314163

== 314201–314300 ==
back to top

Named minor planet	Provisional	This minor planet was named for...	Ref · Catalog
There are no named minor planets in this number range

== 314301–314400 ==
back to top

Named minor planet	Provisional	This minor planet was named for...	Ref · Catalog
There are no named minor planets in this number range

== 314401–314500 ==
back to top

Named minor planet	Provisional	This minor planet was named for...	Ref · Catalog
There are no named minor planets in this number range

== 314501–314600 ==
back to top

Named minor planet	Provisional	This minor planet was named for...	Ref · Catalog
There are no named minor planets in this number range

== 314601–314700 ==
back to top

Named minor planet	Provisional	This minor planet was named for...	Ref · Catalog
314650 Neilnorman	2006 OC_{1}	Neil Norman (born 1972) is a British astronomer, writer, broadcaster, humorist and creator of the Comet Watch internet resource. He is a Fellow of the Royal Astronomical Society and creator of the Solar System Bodies and Minor Solar System Bodies internet resources.	JPL · 314650

== 314701–314800 ==
back to top

Named minor planet	Provisional	This minor planet was named for...	Ref · Catalog
314703 Davidflynn	2006 RN_{107}	David P. Flynn, American computer scientis.	IAU · 314703

== 314801–314900 ==
back to top

Named minor planet	Provisional	This minor planet was named for...	Ref · Catalog
314808 Martindutertre	2006 TQ_{105}	Saint-Martin-du-Tertre is a French town to the north of Paris that is twinned with the municipality of San Marcello Piteglio, the discovery site for this minor planet.	JPL · 314808

== 314901–315000 ==
back to top

Named minor planet	Provisional	This minor planet was named for...	Ref · Catalog
314988 Sireland	2006 XO_{67}	Sarah Ireland (born 1996), interested in the pursuit of astronomical knowledge, following in the Canadian tradition of astronomical excellence and embodying the spirit of Beyond the International Year of Astronomy.	JPL · 314988

back to top

Preceded by 313,001–314,000	Meanings of minor-planet names List of minor planets: 314,001–315,000	Succeeded by 315,001–316,000
