= List of minor planets: 314001–315000 =

The following is a partial list of minor planets, running from minor-planet number 314001 through 315000, inclusive. The primary data for this and other partial lists is based on JPL's "Small-Body Orbital Elements" and data available from the Minor Planet Center. Critical list information is also provided by the MPC, unless otherwise specified from Lowell Observatory. A detailed description of the table's columns and additional sources are given on the main page including a complete list of every page in this series, and a statistical break-up on the dynamical classification of minor planets.

Also see the summary list of all named bodies in numerical and alphabetical order, and the corresponding naming citations for the number range of this particular list. New namings may only be added to this list after official publication, as the preannouncement of names is condemned by the Working Group for Small Bodies Nomenclature of the International Astronomical Union.

Near-Earth obj.	MBA (inner)	MBA (outer)	Centaur
Mars-crosser	MBA (middle)	Jupiter trojan	Trans-Neptunian obj.
Unclassified

== 314001–314100 ==
Designation			Discovery			Properties		Ref
Permanent	Provisional	Named after	Date	Site	Discoverer(s)	Category	Diam.	Ref
314001	2004 TU_{346}	—	October 15, 2004	Anderson Mesa	LONEOS	·	4.2 km	MPC · JPL
314002	2004 TA_{348}	—	October 4, 2004	Kitt Peak	Spacewatch	·	3.0 km	MPC · JPL
314003	2004 TO_{359}	—	October 9, 2004	Anderson Mesa	LONEOS	EOS	3.0 km	MPC · JPL
314004	2004 TG_{366}	—	October 9, 2004	Socorro	LINEAR	·	940 m	MPC · JPL
314005	2004 UK	—	October 18, 2004	Socorro	LINEAR	·	1.4 km	MPC · JPL
314006	2004 UX_{3}	—	October 16, 2004	Socorro	LINEAR	·	1.0 km	MPC · JPL
314007	2004 UO_{5}	—	October 19, 2004	Socorro	LINEAR	·	1.0 km	MPC · JPL
314008	2004 UW_{7}	—	October 21, 2004	Socorro	LINEAR	·	830 m	MPC · JPL
314009	2004 VR_{22}	—	November 4, 2004	Catalina	CSS	·	4.5 km	MPC · JPL
314010	2004 VO_{23}	—	November 5, 2004	Palomar	NEAT	·	1.2 km	MPC · JPL
314011	2004 VV_{28}	—	November 4, 2004	Catalina	CSS	·	4.1 km	MPC · JPL
314012	2004 VS_{63}	—	November 10, 2004	Kitt Peak	Spacewatch	·	1.2 km	MPC · JPL
314013	2004 VA_{81}	—	November 4, 2004	Kitt Peak	Spacewatch	·	580 m	MPC · JPL
314014	2004 VV_{99}	—	November 9, 2004	Mauna Kea	Veillet, C.	THM	2.6 km	MPC · JPL
314015	2004 VK_{112}	—	November 2, 2004	Anderson Mesa	LONEOS	·	4.7 km	MPC · JPL
314016	2004 VC_{130}	—	November 4, 2004	Kitt Peak	Spacewatch	·	700 m	MPC · JPL
314017	2004 WO_{3}	—	November 17, 2004	Campo Imperatore	CINEOS	·	5.0 km	MPC · JPL
314018	2004 WK_{5}	—	November 19, 2004	Socorro	LINEAR	·	5.0 km	MPC · JPL
314019	2004 WP_{11}	—	November 17, 2004	Campo Imperatore	CINEOS	·	640 m	MPC · JPL
314020	2004 XF_{9}	—	December 2, 2004	Catalina	CSS	·	1.2 km	MPC · JPL
314021	2004 XP_{19}	—	December 8, 2004	Socorro	LINEAR	·	850 m	MPC · JPL
314022	2004 XR_{20}	—	December 8, 2004	Socorro	LINEAR	slow	1.2 km	MPC · JPL
314023	2004 XS_{25}	—	December 9, 2004	Catalina	CSS	·	900 m	MPC · JPL
314024	2004 XH_{30}	—	December 10, 2004	Campo Imperatore	CINEOS	·	850 m	MPC · JPL
314025	2004 XO_{32}	—	December 10, 2004	Socorro	LINEAR	·	880 m	MPC · JPL
314026	2004 XH_{40}	—	December 10, 2004	Socorro	LINEAR	·	1.1 km	MPC · JPL
314027	2004 XJ_{48}	—	December 10, 2004	Socorro	LINEAR	·	1.0 km	MPC · JPL
314028	2004 XO_{64}	—	December 2, 2004	Kitt Peak	Spacewatch	·	770 m	MPC · JPL
314029	2004 XJ_{76}	—	December 10, 2004	Kitt Peak	Spacewatch	·	900 m	MPC · JPL
314030	2004 XK_{94}	—	December 11, 2004	Kitt Peak	Spacewatch	·	840 m	MPC · JPL
314031	2004 XZ_{106}	—	December 11, 2004	Socorro	LINEAR	·	1.1 km	MPC · JPL
314032	2004 XB_{107}	—	December 11, 2004	Catalina	CSS	·	700 m	MPC · JPL
314033	2004 XC_{107}	—	December 11, 2004	Catalina	CSS	·	770 m	MPC · JPL
314034	2004 XW_{119}	—	December 12, 2004	Kitt Peak	Spacewatch	·	780 m	MPC · JPL
314035	2004 XS_{142}	—	December 9, 2004	Kitt Peak	Spacewatch	·	750 m	MPC · JPL
314036	2004 YY_{5}	—	December 16, 2004	Socorro	LINEAR	·	5.2 km	MPC · JPL
314037	2004 YT_{21}	—	December 18, 2004	Mount Lemmon	Mount Lemmon Survey	·	890 m	MPC · JPL
314038	2004 YB_{32}	—	December 16, 2004	Anderson Mesa	LONEOS	·	1.4 km	MPC · JPL
314039	2004 YT_{36}	—	December 20, 2004	Mount Lemmon	Mount Lemmon Survey	V	790 m	MPC · JPL
314040 Tavannes	2005 AU	Tavannes	January 4, 2005	Vicques	M. Ory	·	1.1 km	MPC · JPL
314041	2005 AT_{2}	—	January 6, 2005	Catalina	CSS	·	880 m	MPC · JPL
314042	2005 AF_{3}	—	January 6, 2005	Catalina	CSS	·	1.1 km	MPC · JPL
314043	2005 AM_{4}	—	January 6, 2005	Catalina	CSS	·	920 m	MPC · JPL
314044	2005 AP_{5}	—	January 6, 2005	Catalina	CSS	·	760 m	MPC · JPL
314045	2005 AC_{7}	—	January 6, 2005	Catalina	CSS	·	1.0 km	MPC · JPL
314046	2005 AB_{12}	—	January 6, 2005	Catalina	CSS	·	1.1 km	MPC · JPL
314047	2005 AS_{13}	—	January 7, 2005	Socorro	LINEAR	·	800 m	MPC · JPL
314048	2005 AR_{14}	—	January 6, 2005	Catalina	CSS	·	860 m	MPC · JPL
314049	2005 AH_{15}	—	January 7, 2005	Socorro	LINEAR	·	1.1 km	MPC · JPL
314050	2005 AU_{17}	—	January 6, 2005	Socorro	LINEAR	·	940 m	MPC · JPL
314051	2005 AM_{21}	—	January 6, 2005	Catalina	CSS	·	940 m	MPC · JPL
314052	2005 AW_{24}	—	January 7, 2005	Kitt Peak	Spacewatch	·	940 m	MPC · JPL
314053	2005 AG_{29}	—	January 14, 2005	Kvistaberg	Uppsala-DLR Asteroid Survey	·	850 m	MPC · JPL
314054	2005 AJ_{34}	—	January 13, 2005	Kitt Peak	Spacewatch	·	890 m	MPC · JPL
314055	2005 AK_{36}	—	January 13, 2005	Socorro	LINEAR	·	890 m	MPC · JPL
314056	2005 AZ_{38}	—	January 13, 2005	Kitt Peak	Spacewatch	NYS	960 m	MPC · JPL
314057	2005 AN_{39}	—	January 13, 2005	Socorro	LINEAR	·	1.3 km	MPC · JPL
314058	2005 AU_{45}	—	January 15, 2005	Kitt Peak	Spacewatch	·	930 m	MPC · JPL
314059	2005 AZ_{52}	—	January 13, 2005	Catalina	CSS	·	2.3 km	MPC · JPL
314060	2005 AQ_{58}	—	January 15, 2005	Socorro	LINEAR	·	1.1 km	MPC · JPL
314061	2005 AR_{70}	—	January 15, 2005	Kitt Peak	Spacewatch	·	840 m	MPC · JPL
314062	2005 AA_{75}	—	January 15, 2005	Kitt Peak	Spacewatch	·	1.2 km	MPC · JPL
314063	2005 AU_{76}	—	January 15, 2005	Kitt Peak	Spacewatch	NYS	980 m	MPC · JPL
314064	2005 BV_{5}	—	January 16, 2005	Socorro	LINEAR	V	800 m	MPC · JPL
314065	2005 BP_{6}	—	January 16, 2005	Socorro	LINEAR	·	1.1 km	MPC · JPL
314066	2005 BZ_{9}	—	January 16, 2005	Socorro	LINEAR	·	910 m	MPC · JPL
314067	2005 BS_{11}	—	January 16, 2005	Kitt Peak	Spacewatch	V	780 m	MPC · JPL
314068	2005 BV_{20}	—	January 16, 2005	Kitt Peak	Spacewatch	·	780 m	MPC · JPL
314069	2005 BB_{27}	—	January 18, 2005	Catalina	CSS	PHO	1.1 km	MPC · JPL
314070	2005 CG_{1}	—	February 1, 2005	Catalina	CSS	·	780 m	MPC · JPL
314071	2005 CO_{1}	—	February 1, 2005	Catalina	CSS	·	850 m	MPC · JPL
314072	2005 CQ_{6}	—	February 1, 2005	Catalina	CSS	PHO	1.6 km	MPC · JPL
314073	2005 CW_{6}	—	February 3, 2005	Palomar	NEAT	PHO	2.0 km	MPC · JPL
314074	2005 CP_{10}	—	February 1, 2005	Kitt Peak	Spacewatch	·	970 m	MPC · JPL
314075	2005 CC_{11}	—	February 1, 2005	Kitt Peak	Spacewatch	·	810 m	MPC · JPL
314076	2005 CQ_{17}	—	February 2, 2005	Socorro	LINEAR	·	970 m	MPC · JPL
314077	2005 CF_{22}	—	February 3, 2005	Socorro	LINEAR	·	940 m	MPC · JPL
314078	2005 CZ_{22}	—	February 1, 2005	Catalina	CSS	·	1.3 km	MPC · JPL
314079	2005 CV_{25}	—	February 4, 2005	Kitt Peak	Spacewatch	APO	410 m	MPC · JPL
314080	2005 CQ_{28}	—	February 1, 2005	Kitt Peak	Spacewatch	·	920 m	MPC · JPL
314081	2005 CU_{32}	—	February 2, 2005	Kitt Peak	Spacewatch	·	1.1 km	MPC · JPL
314082 Dryope	2005 CZ_{36}	Dryope	February 6, 2005	Uccle	E. W. Elst, H. Debehogne	APO +1km · PHA	1.1 km	MPC · JPL
314083	2005 CR_{38}	—	February 3, 2005	Socorro	LINEAR	·	1.0 km	MPC · JPL
314084	2005 CN_{44}	—	February 2, 2005	Kitt Peak	Spacewatch	V	830 m	MPC · JPL
314085	2005 CO_{47}	—	February 2, 2005	Kitt Peak	Spacewatch	·	960 m	MPC · JPL
314086	2005 CU_{50}	—	February 2, 2005	Socorro	LINEAR	·	1.2 km	MPC · JPL
314087	2005 CV_{57}	—	February 2, 2005	Catalina	CSS	·	1.1 km	MPC · JPL
314088	2005 CO_{60}	—	February 4, 2005	Kitt Peak	Spacewatch	(2076)	810 m	MPC · JPL
314089	2005 CE_{62}	—	February 14, 2005	Mayhill	Lowe, A.	NYS	950 m	MPC · JPL
314090	2005 CV_{65}	—	February 9, 2005	Kitt Peak	Spacewatch	NYS	1.3 km	MPC · JPL
314091	2005 DS_{1}	—	February 28, 2005	Goodricke-Pigott	R. A. Tucker	·	1.3 km	MPC · JPL
314092	2005 EC_{14}	—	March 3, 2005	Kitt Peak	Spacewatch	·	860 m	MPC · JPL
314093	2005 EF_{14}	—	March 3, 2005	Kitt Peak	Spacewatch	PHO	3.0 km	MPC · JPL
314094	2005 EW_{15}	—	March 3, 2005	Kitt Peak	Spacewatch	NYS	1.1 km	MPC · JPL
314095	2005 EE_{18}	—	March 3, 2005	Kitt Peak	Spacewatch	·	1.1 km	MPC · JPL
314096	2005 EP_{22}	—	September 30, 2003	Kitt Peak	Spacewatch	·	1.4 km	MPC · JPL
314097	2005 EX_{25}	—	March 3, 2005	Catalina	CSS	NYS	990 m	MPC · JPL
314098	2005 EK_{35}	—	March 3, 2005	Socorro	LINEAR	·	1.5 km	MPC · JPL
314099	2005 EC_{44}	—	March 3, 2005	Kitt Peak	Spacewatch	·	1.3 km	MPC · JPL
314100	2005 EB_{49}	—	March 3, 2005	Catalina	CSS	NYS	1.0 km	MPC · JPL

== 314101–314200 ==
back to top

Designation			Discovery			Properties		Ref
Permanent	Provisional	Named after	Date	Site	Discoverer(s)	Category	Diam.	Ref
314101	2005 EZ_{52}	—	March 4, 2005	Kitt Peak	Spacewatch	MAS	700 m	MPC · JPL
314102	2005 EM_{55}	—	March 4, 2005	Kitt Peak	Spacewatch	·	1.0 km	MPC · JPL
314103	2005 EG_{74}	—	March 3, 2005	Kitt Peak	Spacewatch	·	1.4 km	MPC · JPL
314104	2005 ER_{78}	—	March 3, 2005	Catalina	CSS	·	1.3 km	MPC · JPL
314105	2005 EY_{78}	—	March 3, 2005	Catalina	CSS	·	1.9 km	MPC · JPL
314106	2005 EO_{79}	—	March 3, 2005	Catalina	CSS	3:2	7.6 km	MPC · JPL
314107	2005 EQ_{80}	—	March 4, 2005	Kitt Peak	Spacewatch	·	1.1 km	MPC · JPL
314108	2005 EP_{84}	—	March 4, 2005	Socorro	LINEAR	·	1.4 km	MPC · JPL
314109	2005 EU_{87}	—	March 4, 2005	Mount Lemmon	Mount Lemmon Survey	·	1.2 km	MPC · JPL
314110	2005 ED_{90}	—	March 8, 2005	Anderson Mesa	LONEOS	PHO	1.2 km	MPC · JPL
314111	2005 ES_{90}	—	March 8, 2005	Socorro	LINEAR	·	990 m	MPC · JPL
314112	2005 EY_{90}	—	March 8, 2005	Socorro	LINEAR	·	1.3 km	MPC · JPL
314113	2005 EN_{94}	—	March 8, 2005	Kitt Peak	Spacewatch	·	1.2 km	MPC · JPL
314114	2005 EO_{94}	—	March 8, 2005	Anderson Mesa	LONEOS	NYS	1.3 km	MPC · JPL
314115	2005 EO_{103}	—	March 4, 2005	Kitt Peak	Spacewatch	·	1.2 km	MPC · JPL
314116	2005 EP_{103}	—	March 4, 2005	Kitt Peak	Spacewatch	MAS	730 m	MPC · JPL
314117	2005 ET_{104}	—	March 4, 2005	Mount Lemmon	Mount Lemmon Survey	·	880 m	MPC · JPL
314118	2005 EW_{119}	—	March 8, 2005	Anderson Mesa	LONEOS	·	1.1 km	MPC · JPL
314119	2005 EU_{131}	—	March 9, 2005	Mount Lemmon	Mount Lemmon Survey	·	1.3 km	MPC · JPL
314120	2005 EC_{138}	—	March 9, 2005	Mount Lemmon	Mount Lemmon Survey	MAS	830 m	MPC · JPL
314121	2005 EC_{147}	—	March 10, 2005	Mount Lemmon	Mount Lemmon Survey	NYS	1.1 km	MPC · JPL
314122	2005 ET_{151}	—	March 10, 2005	Kitt Peak	Spacewatch	NYS	1.4 km	MPC · JPL
314123	2005 EZ_{151}	—	March 10, 2005	Kitt Peak	Spacewatch	·	1.4 km	MPC · JPL
314124	2005 EJ_{152}	—	March 10, 2005	Kitt Peak	Spacewatch	MAS	940 m	MPC · JPL
314125	2005 EL_{154}	—	March 8, 2005	Mount Lemmon	Mount Lemmon Survey	·	1.3 km	MPC · JPL
314126	2005 EN_{155}	—	March 8, 2005	Mount Lemmon	Mount Lemmon Survey	NYS	1.1 km	MPC · JPL
314127	2005 EM_{157}	—	March 9, 2005	Mount Lemmon	Mount Lemmon Survey	MAS	820 m	MPC · JPL
314128	2005 EJ_{161}	—	March 9, 2005	Mount Lemmon	Mount Lemmon Survey	·	1.4 km	MPC · JPL
314129	2005 ER_{164}	—	March 11, 2005	Kitt Peak	Spacewatch	·	1.5 km	MPC · JPL
314130	2005 EM_{165}	—	March 11, 2005	Kitt Peak	Spacewatch	NYS	1.2 km	MPC · JPL
314131	2005 EB_{179}	—	March 9, 2005	Kitt Peak	Spacewatch	·	1.2 km	MPC · JPL
314132	2005 EK_{179}	—	March 9, 2005	Kitt Peak	Spacewatch	NYS	960 m	MPC · JPL
314133	2005 EU_{180}	—	March 9, 2005	Mount Lemmon	Mount Lemmon Survey	·	940 m	MPC · JPL
314134	2005 EC_{185}	—	March 9, 2005	Kitt Peak	Spacewatch	·	1.3 km	MPC · JPL
314135	2005 EC_{187}	—	March 10, 2005	Mount Lemmon	Mount Lemmon Survey	NYS	1.1 km	MPC · JPL
314136	2005 EA_{190}	—	March 11, 2005	Mount Lemmon	Mount Lemmon Survey	V	620 m	MPC · JPL
314137	2005 EM_{190}	—	March 11, 2005	Mount Lemmon	Mount Lemmon Survey	·	1.1 km	MPC · JPL
314138	2005 EW_{192}	—	March 11, 2005	Mount Lemmon	Mount Lemmon Survey	NYS	1.3 km	MPC · JPL
314139	2005 EO_{197}	—	March 11, 2005	Mount Lemmon	Mount Lemmon Survey	·	1.2 km	MPC · JPL
314140	2005 EP_{197}	—	March 3, 2005	Kitt Peak	Spacewatch	NYS	1.1 km	MPC · JPL
314141	2005 ED_{198}	—	March 11, 2005	Mount Lemmon	Mount Lemmon Survey	NYS	1.4 km	MPC · JPL
314142	2005 EE_{203}	—	March 10, 2005	Mount Lemmon	Mount Lemmon Survey	NYS	1.4 km	MPC · JPL
314143	2005 ED_{208}	—	March 4, 2005	Kitt Peak	Spacewatch	·	1.7 km	MPC · JPL
314144	2005 EQ_{210}	—	March 4, 2005	Kitt Peak	Spacewatch	·	1.5 km	MPC · JPL
314145	2005 ET_{212}	—	March 4, 2005	Mount Lemmon	Mount Lemmon Survey	CLA	1.5 km	MPC · JPL
314146	2005 EO_{213}	—	March 4, 2005	Socorro	LINEAR	·	1.8 km	MPC · JPL
314147	2005 ED_{233}	—	March 10, 2005	Anderson Mesa	LONEOS	·	1.3 km	MPC · JPL
314148	2005 EU_{244}	—	March 11, 2005	Mount Lemmon	Mount Lemmon Survey	·	1.1 km	MPC · JPL
314149	2005 ET_{247}	—	March 12, 2005	Socorro	LINEAR	NYS	1.5 km	MPC · JPL
314150	2005 EQ_{251}	—	March 10, 2005	Anderson Mesa	LONEOS	·	1.2 km	MPC · JPL
314151	2005 EQ_{266}	—	March 13, 2005	Kitt Peak	Spacewatch	NYS	1.0 km	MPC · JPL
314152	2005 EZ_{271}	—	March 9, 2005	Socorro	LINEAR	·	1.5 km	MPC · JPL
314153	2005 EH_{273}	—	March 3, 2005	Kitt Peak	Spacewatch	NYS	1.1 km	MPC · JPL
314154	2005 EL_{279}	—	March 10, 2005	Anderson Mesa	LONEOS	PHO	1.1 km	MPC · JPL
314155	2005 EN_{281}	—	March 10, 2005	Anderson Mesa	LONEOS	·	1.2 km	MPC · JPL
314156	2005 EG_{292}	—	March 10, 2005	Catalina	CSS	V	920 m	MPC · JPL
314157	2005 EE_{324}	—	March 3, 2005	Catalina	CSS	·	1.1 km	MPC · JPL
314158	2005 EL_{324}	—	March 10, 2005	Mount Lemmon	Mount Lemmon Survey	·	1.4 km	MPC · JPL
314159 Mattparker	2005 FW_{1}	Mattparker	March 16, 2005	Mount Lemmon	Mount Lemmon Survey	·	1.2 km	MPC · JPL
314160	2005 FV_{5}	—	March 31, 2005	Vail-Jarnac	Jarnac	·	1.2 km	MPC · JPL
314161	2005 FY_{7}	—	March 30, 2005	Catalina	CSS	·	3.0 km	MPC · JPL
314162	2005 FL_{8}	—	March 21, 2005	Junk Bond	Junk Bond	·	1.3 km	MPC · JPL
314163 Kittenberger	2005 GX	Kittenberger	April 1, 2005	Piszkéstető	K. Sárneczky	·	1.0 km	MPC · JPL
314164	2005 GD_{11}	—	April 1, 2005	Anderson Mesa	LONEOS	·	1.3 km	MPC · JPL
314165	2005 GF_{25}	—	April 2, 2005	Palomar	NEAT	3:2	6.3 km	MPC · JPL
314166	2005 GP_{36}	—	April 2, 2005	Mount Lemmon	Mount Lemmon Survey	·	1.2 km	MPC · JPL
314167	2005 GX_{45}	—	April 5, 2005	Mount Lemmon	Mount Lemmon Survey	NYS	1.1 km	MPC · JPL
314168	2005 GK_{46}	—	April 5, 2005	Mount Lemmon	Mount Lemmon Survey	·	1.0 km	MPC · JPL
314169	2005 GA_{61}	—	April 1, 2005	Anderson Mesa	LONEOS	·	2.0 km	MPC · JPL
314170	2005 GW_{62}	—	April 2, 2005	Mount Lemmon	Mount Lemmon Survey	·	880 m	MPC · JPL
314171	2005 GT_{73}	—	April 4, 2005	Catalina	CSS	·	1.7 km	MPC · JPL
314172	2005 GZ_{73}	—	April 4, 2005	Catalina	CSS	PHO	1.3 km	MPC · JPL
314173	2005 GM_{74}	—	April 5, 2005	Anderson Mesa	LONEOS	·	1.6 km	MPC · JPL
314174	2005 GE_{98}	—	April 7, 2005	Mount Lemmon	Mount Lemmon Survey	MAS	740 m	MPC · JPL
314175	2005 GZ_{99}	—	April 9, 2005	Kitt Peak	Spacewatch	·	1.8 km	MPC · JPL
314176	2005 GW_{111}	—	April 5, 2005	Palomar	NEAT	3:2	11 km	MPC · JPL
314177	2005 GE_{119}	—	April 11, 2005	Anderson Mesa	LONEOS	NYS	1.5 km	MPC · JPL
314178	2005 GV_{120}	—	April 5, 2005	Mount Lemmon	Mount Lemmon Survey	·	1.1 km	MPC · JPL
314179	2005 GF_{126}	—	April 11, 2005	Anderson Mesa	LONEOS	MAS	910 m	MPC · JPL
314180	2005 GS_{128}	—	April 1, 2005	Catalina	CSS	PHO	1.4 km	MPC · JPL
314181	2005 GO_{136}	—	April 10, 2005	Kitt Peak	Spacewatch	3:2	6.6 km	MPC · JPL
314182	2005 GY_{153}	—	April 14, 2005	Kitt Peak	Spacewatch	·	1.3 km	MPC · JPL
314183	2005 GU_{167}	—	April 11, 2005	Mount Lemmon	Mount Lemmon Survey	MAS	740 m	MPC · JPL
314184	2005 GD_{169}	—	April 12, 2005	Kitt Peak	Spacewatch	·	1.1 km	MPC · JPL
314185	2005 GA_{181}	—	March 9, 2005	Mount Lemmon	Mount Lemmon Survey	·	1.2 km	MPC · JPL
314186	2005 GU_{181}	—	April 12, 2005	Kitt Peak	Spacewatch	MAS	660 m	MPC · JPL
314187	2005 HR_{6}	—	April 19, 2005	Catalina	CSS	H	980 m	MPC · JPL
314188	2005 JL_{50}	—	May 4, 2005	Kitt Peak	Spacewatch	NYS	1.1 km	MPC · JPL
314189	2005 JV_{70}	—	May 7, 2005	Catalina	CSS	·	1.4 km	MPC · JPL
314190	2005 JO_{119}	—	May 10, 2005	Kitt Peak	Spacewatch	·	2.7 km	MPC · JPL
314191	2005 JS_{119}	—	May 10, 2005	Kitt Peak	Spacewatch	L4	10 km	MPC · JPL
314192	2005 JP_{125}	—	May 11, 2005	Kitt Peak	Spacewatch	·	2.5 km	MPC · JPL
314193	2005 JF_{126}	—	May 12, 2005	Kitt Peak	Spacewatch	·	1.7 km	MPC · JPL
314194	2005 JU_{138}	—	May 13, 2005	Mount Lemmon	Mount Lemmon Survey	NYS	1.4 km	MPC · JPL
314195	2005 JH_{143}	—	May 15, 2005	Mount Lemmon	Mount Lemmon Survey	MAR	1.4 km	MPC · JPL
314196	2005 JZ_{153}	—	May 4, 2005	Kitt Peak	Spacewatch	·	1.6 km	MPC · JPL
314197	2005 KX	—	May 16, 2005	Kitt Peak	Spacewatch	·	1.0 km	MPC · JPL
314198	2005 KG_{3}	—	May 17, 2005	Mount Lemmon	Mount Lemmon Survey	NYS	1.3 km	MPC · JPL
314199	2005 LB_{4}	—	June 1, 2005	Kitt Peak	Spacewatch	·	1.4 km	MPC · JPL
314200	2005 LK_{14}	—	June 4, 2005	Kitt Peak	Spacewatch	MAR	1.4 km	MPC · JPL

== 314201–314300 ==
back to top

Designation			Discovery			Properties		Ref
Permanent	Provisional	Named after	Date	Site	Discoverer(s)	Category	Diam.	Ref
314201	2005 LM_{20}	—	June 4, 2005	Kitt Peak	Spacewatch	·	2.2 km	MPC · JPL
314202	2005 LZ_{22}	—	June 8, 2005	Kitt Peak	Spacewatch	EUN	1.6 km	MPC · JPL
314203	2005 LN_{27}	—	June 9, 2005	Kitt Peak	Spacewatch	EUN	1.4 km	MPC · JPL
314204	2005 LD_{45}	—	June 13, 2005	Kitt Peak	Spacewatch	EUN	1.3 km	MPC · JPL
314205	2005 MG_{8}	—	June 15, 2005	Mount Lemmon	Mount Lemmon Survey	·	2.5 km	MPC · JPL
314206	2005 MG_{13}	—	June 29, 2005	Palomar	NEAT	·	2.2 km	MPC · JPL
314207	2005 MV_{21}	—	June 30, 2005	Kitt Peak	Spacewatch	·	2.4 km	MPC · JPL
314208	2005 MX_{30}	—	June 30, 2005	Kitt Peak	Spacewatch	·	1.4 km	MPC · JPL
314209	2005 MX_{40}	—	June 30, 2005	Palomar	NEAT	JUN	1.5 km	MPC · JPL
314210	2005 MT_{52}	—	June 30, 2005	Palomar	NEAT	EUN	1.4 km	MPC · JPL
314211	2005 MX_{52}	—	June 23, 2005	Palomar	NEAT	H	710 m	MPC · JPL
314212	2005 NJ_{1}	—	July 2, 2005	Catalina	CSS	APO · PHA · critical	690 m	MPC · JPL
314213	2005 NW_{4}	—	July 3, 2005	Mount Lemmon	Mount Lemmon Survey	·	1.9 km	MPC · JPL
314214	2005 NE_{16}	—	July 2, 2005	Kitt Peak	Spacewatch	·	1.2 km	MPC · JPL
314215	2005 NP_{46}	—	July 6, 2005	Kitt Peak	Spacewatch	·	1.5 km	MPC · JPL
314216	2005 NC_{61}	—	July 11, 2005	Kitt Peak	Spacewatch	·	1.5 km	MPC · JPL
314217	2005 NO_{61}	—	July 11, 2005	Kitt Peak	Spacewatch	·	1.9 km	MPC · JPL
314218	2005 NV_{87}	—	June 15, 2005	Mount Lemmon	Mount Lemmon Survey	·	2.1 km	MPC · JPL
314219	2005 NA_{101}	—	July 7, 2005	Kitt Peak	Spacewatch	·	1.7 km	MPC · JPL
314220	2005 NA_{102}	—	July 15, 2005	Mount Lemmon	Mount Lemmon Survey	·	1.7 km	MPC · JPL
314221	2005 NE_{122}	—	July 2, 2005	Catalina	CSS	·	2.7 km	MPC · JPL
314222	2005 NT_{123}	—	July 12, 2005	Mount Lemmon	Mount Lemmon Survey	·	4.0 km	MPC · JPL
314223	2005 NT_{124}	—	July 11, 2005	Mount Lemmon	Mount Lemmon Survey	·	2.3 km	MPC · JPL
314224	2005 OU	—	July 17, 2005	Palomar	NEAT	MAR	1.2 km	MPC · JPL
314225	2005 OR_{5}	—	July 28, 2005	Palomar	NEAT	EUN	1.7 km	MPC · JPL
314226	2005 OU_{9}	—	July 27, 2005	Palomar	NEAT	·	1.8 km	MPC · JPL
314227	2005 OJ_{19}	—	July 27, 2005	Palomar	NEAT	H	760 m	MPC · JPL
314228	2005 OY_{27}	—	July 29, 2005	Socorro	LINEAR	·	3.5 km	MPC · JPL
314229	2005 OF_{28}	—	July 30, 2005	Palomar	NEAT	·	1.4 km	MPC · JPL
314230	2005 PV_{1}	—	August 1, 2005	Siding Spring	SSS	·	2.2 km	MPC · JPL
314231	2005 PX_{3}	—	August 6, 2005	Reedy Creek	J. Broughton	·	2.1 km	MPC · JPL
314232	2005 PO_{14}	—	August 4, 2005	Palomar	NEAT	·	2.0 km	MPC · JPL
314233	2005 PT_{14}	—	August 4, 2005	Palomar	NEAT	EUN	1.3 km	MPC · JPL
314234	2005 QJ_{6}	—	August 24, 2005	Palomar	NEAT	·	2.6 km	MPC · JPL
314235	2005 QP_{17}	—	August 25, 2005	Palomar	NEAT	·	2.7 km	MPC · JPL
314236	2005 QY_{21}	—	August 27, 2005	Kitt Peak	Spacewatch	·	2.3 km	MPC · JPL
314237	2005 QP_{22}	—	August 27, 2005	Anderson Mesa	LONEOS	·	2.4 km	MPC · JPL
314238	2005 QA_{28}	—	August 27, 2005	Kitt Peak	Spacewatch	AGN	1.6 km	MPC · JPL
314239	2005 QP_{43}	—	August 26, 2005	Palomar	NEAT	·	2.0 km	MPC · JPL
314240	2005 QO_{46}	—	August 26, 2005	Palomar	NEAT	KOR	2.1 km	MPC · JPL
314241	2005 QP_{53}	—	August 28, 2005	Kitt Peak	Spacewatch	·	2.2 km	MPC · JPL
314242	2005 QR_{55}	—	August 28, 2005	Kitt Peak	Spacewatch	KOR	1.4 km	MPC · JPL
314243	2005 QZ_{57}	—	August 25, 2005	Palomar	NEAT	·	1.9 km	MPC · JPL
314244	2005 QD_{65}	—	August 26, 2005	Palomar	NEAT	·	2.3 km	MPC · JPL
314245	2005 QK_{77}	—	August 24, 2005	Palomar	NEAT	·	2.6 km	MPC · JPL
314246	2005 QM_{77}	—	August 25, 2005	Palomar	NEAT	·	2.1 km	MPC · JPL
314247	2005 QL_{88}	—	August 31, 2005	Drebach	J. Kandler	AGN	1.3 km	MPC · JPL
314248	2005 QE_{93}	—	August 26, 2005	Palomar	NEAT	MRX	1.4 km	MPC · JPL
314249	2005 QV_{97}	—	August 27, 2005	Palomar	NEAT	·	2.4 km	MPC · JPL
314250	2005 QJ_{99}	—	August 30, 2005	Kitt Peak	Spacewatch	·	2.0 km	MPC · JPL
314251	2005 QH_{100}	—	August 29, 2005	Kitt Peak	Spacewatch	·	2.2 km	MPC · JPL
314252	2005 QB_{101}	—	August 27, 2005	Palomar	NEAT	·	2.8 km	MPC · JPL
314253	2005 QM_{101}	—	August 27, 2005	Palomar	NEAT	·	2.1 km	MPC · JPL
314254	2005 QW_{103}	—	August 27, 2005	Palomar	NEAT	HOF	2.9 km	MPC · JPL
314255	2005 QW_{117}	—	August 28, 2005	Kitt Peak	Spacewatch	·	1.9 km	MPC · JPL
314256	2005 QA_{122}	—	August 28, 2005	Kitt Peak	Spacewatch	HOF	2.6 km	MPC · JPL
314257	2005 QG_{124}	—	August 28, 2005	Kitt Peak	Spacewatch	·	2.0 km	MPC · JPL
314258	2005 QD_{127}	—	August 28, 2005	Kitt Peak	Spacewatch	·	2.0 km	MPC · JPL
314259	2005 QU_{136}	—	August 28, 2005	Kitt Peak	Spacewatch	·	1.7 km	MPC · JPL
314260	2005 QA_{139}	—	August 28, 2005	Kitt Peak	Spacewatch	·	2.8 km	MPC · JPL
314261	2005 QH_{145}	—	August 27, 2005	Anderson Mesa	LONEOS	·	2.6 km	MPC · JPL
314262	2005 QM_{149}	—	August 28, 2005	Siding Spring	SSS	·	2.4 km	MPC · JPL
314263	2005 QX_{153}	—	August 27, 2005	Palomar	NEAT	·	2.8 km	MPC · JPL
314264	2005 QT_{154}	—	July 28, 2005	Palomar	NEAT	·	2.3 km	MPC · JPL
314265	2005 QP_{166}	—	August 26, 2005	Palomar	NEAT	·	1.6 km	MPC · JPL
314266	2005 QE_{167}	—	August 26, 2005	Palomar	NEAT	EUN	1.7 km	MPC · JPL
314267	2005 QN_{177}	—	August 29, 2005	Kitt Peak	Spacewatch	·	2.1 km	MPC · JPL
314268	2005 QY_{181}	—	August 31, 2005	Kitt Peak	Spacewatch	·	2.9 km	MPC · JPL
314269	2005 RC_{2}	—	September 2, 2005	Palomar	NEAT	T_{j} (2.94)	4.3 km	MPC · JPL
314270	2005 RQ_{16}	—	September 1, 2005	Anderson Mesa	LONEOS	·	1.9 km	MPC · JPL
314271	2005 RF_{26}	—	September 12, 2005	Junk Bond	D. Healy	·	2.1 km	MPC · JPL
314272	2005 RU_{30}	—	September 11, 2005	Kitt Peak	Spacewatch	·	2.4 km	MPC · JPL
314273	2005 RT_{39}	—	September 14, 2005	Catalina	CSS	H	890 m	MPC · JPL
314274	2005 RM_{51}	—	September 11, 2005	Kitt Peak	Spacewatch	WIT	1.2 km	MPC · JPL
314275	2005 SF_{17}	—	September 26, 2005	Kitt Peak	Spacewatch	PAD	2.0 km	MPC · JPL
314276	2005 SP_{22}	—	September 23, 2005	Kitt Peak	Spacewatch	·	3.7 km	MPC · JPL
314277	2005 SF_{23}	—	September 23, 2005	Catalina	CSS	·	2.5 km	MPC · JPL
314278	2005 SC_{30}	—	September 23, 2005	Catalina	CSS	H ·	870 m	MPC · JPL
314279	2005 SJ_{32}	—	September 23, 2005	Kitt Peak	Spacewatch	·	1.8 km	MPC · JPL
314280	2005 SN_{32}	—	September 23, 2005	Kitt Peak	Spacewatch	·	1.9 km	MPC · JPL
314281	2005 SP_{33}	—	September 23, 2005	Kitt Peak	Spacewatch	·	2.3 km	MPC · JPL
314282	2005 SN_{38}	—	September 24, 2005	Kitt Peak	Spacewatch	KOR	1.4 km	MPC · JPL
314283	2005 SJ_{42}	—	September 24, 2005	Kitt Peak	Spacewatch	HOF	2.8 km	MPC · JPL
314284	2005 SH_{47}	—	September 24, 2005	Kitt Peak	Spacewatch	HOF	2.8 km	MPC · JPL
314285	2005 SY_{55}	—	September 25, 2005	Kitt Peak	Spacewatch	·	2.7 km	MPC · JPL
314286	2005 SS_{62}	—	September 26, 2005	Kitt Peak	Spacewatch	·	2.3 km	MPC · JPL
314287	2005 SG_{63}	—	September 26, 2005	Palomar	NEAT	·	2.4 km	MPC · JPL
314288	2005 SJ_{67}	—	September 27, 2005	Kitt Peak	Spacewatch	·	1.5 km	MPC · JPL
314289	2005 SN_{69}	—	September 27, 2005	Kitt Peak	Spacewatch	·	2.4 km	MPC · JPL
314290	2005 SZ_{71}	—	September 23, 2005	Anderson Mesa	LONEOS	·	3.6 km	MPC · JPL
314291	2005 SA_{75}	—	September 24, 2005	Kitt Peak	Spacewatch	KOR	1.3 km	MPC · JPL
314292	2005 SR_{79}	—	September 24, 2005	Kitt Peak	Spacewatch	KOR	1.2 km	MPC · JPL
314293	2005 SU_{81}	—	September 24, 2005	Kitt Peak	Spacewatch	HOF	3.2 km	MPC · JPL
314294	2005 SE_{82}	—	September 24, 2005	Kitt Peak	Spacewatch	KOR	1.1 km	MPC · JPL
314295	2005 SH_{94}	—	September 25, 2005	Kitt Peak	Spacewatch	·	2.2 km	MPC · JPL
314296	2005 SQ_{96}	—	September 25, 2005	Palomar	NEAT	·	2.6 km	MPC · JPL
314297	2005 SH_{97}	—	September 25, 2005	Palomar	NEAT	·	4.1 km	MPC · JPL
314298	2005 SZ_{99}	—	September 25, 2005	Kitt Peak	Spacewatch	·	1.9 km	MPC · JPL
314299	2005 ST_{100}	—	September 25, 2005	Kitt Peak	Spacewatch	·	1.8 km	MPC · JPL
314300	2005 SN_{101}	—	September 25, 2005	Kitt Peak	Spacewatch	·	2.0 km	MPC · JPL

== 314301–314400 ==
back to top

Designation			Discovery			Properties		Ref
Permanent	Provisional	Named after	Date	Site	Discoverer(s)	Category	Diam.	Ref
314301	2005 SJ_{109}	—	September 26, 2005	Kitt Peak	Spacewatch	·	1.7 km	MPC · JPL
314302	2005 SY_{114}	—	September 27, 2005	Kitt Peak	Spacewatch	·	2.0 km	MPC · JPL
314303	2005 SA_{133}	—	September 29, 2005	Kitt Peak	Spacewatch	·	2.1 km	MPC · JPL
314304	2005 SK_{134}	—	September 23, 2005	Catalina	CSS	H · slow	790 m	MPC · JPL
314305	2005 SU_{136}	—	September 24, 2005	Kitt Peak	Spacewatch	·	2.5 km	MPC · JPL
314306	2005 SV_{138}	—	September 25, 2005	Kitt Peak	Spacewatch	·	1.6 km	MPC · JPL
314307	2005 SO_{141}	—	September 25, 2005	Kitt Peak	Spacewatch	·	2.6 km	MPC · JPL
314308	2005 SP_{143}	—	September 25, 2005	Kitt Peak	Spacewatch	·	2.4 km	MPC · JPL
314309	2005 SG_{160}	—	September 27, 2005	Kitt Peak	Spacewatch	AGN	1.2 km	MPC · JPL
314310	2005 SZ_{167}	—	September 29, 2005	Palomar	NEAT	·	3.1 km	MPC · JPL
314311	2005 SK_{172}	—	September 29, 2005	Kitt Peak	Spacewatch	·	1.8 km	MPC · JPL
314312	2005 SZ_{174}	—	September 29, 2005	Kitt Peak	Spacewatch	·	2.8 km	MPC · JPL
314313	2005 SG_{188}	—	September 29, 2005	Mount Lemmon	Mount Lemmon Survey	THM	2.0 km	MPC · JPL
314314	2005 SX_{189}	—	September 29, 2005	Mount Lemmon	Mount Lemmon Survey	·	1.6 km	MPC · JPL
314315	2005 SJ_{190}	—	September 29, 2005	Anderson Mesa	LONEOS	·	2.9 km	MPC · JPL
314316	2005 SY_{193}	—	September 29, 2005	Kitt Peak	Spacewatch	·	2.8 km	MPC · JPL
314317	2005 SA_{199}	—	September 30, 2005	Kitt Peak	Spacewatch	KOR	1.3 km	MPC · JPL
314318	2005 SY_{204}	—	September 30, 2005	Anderson Mesa	LONEOS	H	780 m	MPC · JPL
314319	2005 SD_{218}	—	September 30, 2005	Palomar	NEAT	H	710 m	MPC · JPL
314320	2005 SU_{232}	—	September 30, 2005	Mount Lemmon	Mount Lemmon Survey	·	2.3 km	MPC · JPL
314321	2005 SE_{241}	—	September 30, 2005	Kitt Peak	Spacewatch	HOF	2.5 km	MPC · JPL
314322	2005 SN_{260}	—	September 23, 2005	Catalina	CSS	·	2.3 km	MPC · JPL
314323	2005 SP_{271}	—	September 30, 2005	Mount Lemmon	Mount Lemmon Survey	·	3.3 km	MPC · JPL
314324	2005 SA_{281}	—	September 29, 2005	Kitt Peak	Spacewatch	·	2.4 km	MPC · JPL
314325	2005 SN_{281}	—	September 30, 2005	Mauna Kea	Mauna Kea	·	5.1 km	MPC · JPL
314326	2005 SF_{285}	—	October 27, 2005	Catalina	CSS	EOS	2.0 km	MPC · JPL
314327	2005 SQ_{293}	—	September 28, 2005	Palomar	NEAT	·	2.6 km	MPC · JPL
314328	2005 TA_{4}	—	October 1, 2005	Anderson Mesa	LONEOS	·	2.8 km	MPC · JPL
314329	2005 TY_{15}	—	October 1, 2005	Kitt Peak	Spacewatch	AEO	1.3 km	MPC · JPL
314330	2005 TG_{16}	—	October 1, 2005	Kitt Peak	Spacewatch	·	2.6 km	MPC · JPL
314331	2005 TG_{19}	—	October 1, 2005	Mount Lemmon	Mount Lemmon Survey	·	3.4 km	MPC · JPL
314332	2005 TZ_{22}	—	October 1, 2005	Mount Lemmon	Mount Lemmon Survey	·	2.1 km	MPC · JPL
314333	2005 TP_{23}	—	October 1, 2005	Catalina	CSS	·	2.1 km	MPC · JPL
314334	2005 TX_{23}	—	October 1, 2005	Catalina	CSS	HOF	4.4 km	MPC · JPL
314335	2005 TL_{28}	—	October 1, 2005	Kitt Peak	Spacewatch	CYB	3.1 km	MPC · JPL
314336	2005 TR_{38}	—	October 1, 2005	Mount Lemmon	Mount Lemmon Survey	HOF	2.3 km	MPC · JPL
314337	2005 TT_{49}	—	October 9, 2005	Goodricke-Pigott	R. A. Tucker	·	2.3 km	MPC · JPL
314338	2005 TL_{51}	—	October 11, 2005	Bergisch Gladbach	W. Bickel	·	3.8 km	MPC · JPL
314339	2005 TB_{57}	—	October 1, 2005	Mount Lemmon	Mount Lemmon Survey	AGN	1.4 km	MPC · JPL
314340	2005 TN_{70}	—	October 6, 2005	Mount Lemmon	Mount Lemmon Survey	KOR	1.4 km	MPC · JPL
314341	2005 TS_{71}	—	October 3, 2005	Catalina	CSS	H	700 m	MPC · JPL
314342	2005 TT_{74}	—	October 1, 2005	Catalina	CSS	·	2.5 km	MPC · JPL
314343	2005 TU_{85}	—	October 3, 2005	Kitt Peak	Spacewatch	·	2.3 km	MPC · JPL
314344	2005 TQ_{86}	—	October 5, 2005	Kitt Peak	Spacewatch	·	2.0 km	MPC · JPL
314345	2005 TQ_{89}	—	October 5, 2005	Mount Lemmon	Mount Lemmon Survey	·	2.1 km	MPC · JPL
314346	2005 TY_{112}	—	October 7, 2005	Kitt Peak	Spacewatch	·	1.7 km	MPC · JPL
314347	2005 TD_{115}	—	October 7, 2005	Kitt Peak	Spacewatch	·	2.2 km	MPC · JPL
314348	2005 TK_{115}	—	October 7, 2005	Kitt Peak	Spacewatch	AGN	1.3 km	MPC · JPL
314349	2005 TJ_{117}	—	September 26, 2005	Kitt Peak	Spacewatch	·	2.0 km	MPC · JPL
314350	2005 TE_{118}	—	October 7, 2005	Kitt Peak	Spacewatch	KOR	1.2 km	MPC · JPL
314351	2005 TB_{130}	—	October 7, 2005	Kitt Peak	Spacewatch	KOR	1.3 km	MPC · JPL
314352	2005 TA_{131}	—	October 7, 2005	Kitt Peak	Spacewatch	KOR	1.6 km	MPC · JPL
314353	2005 TH_{134}	—	October 10, 2005	Catalina	CSS	·	3.7 km	MPC · JPL
314354	2005 TY_{136}	—	October 6, 2005	Kitt Peak	Spacewatch	·	3.5 km	MPC · JPL
314355	2005 TA_{157}	—	October 9, 2005	Kitt Peak	Spacewatch	·	1.9 km	MPC · JPL
314356	2005 TC_{158}	—	October 9, 2005	Kitt Peak	Spacewatch	615	1.8 km	MPC · JPL
314357	2005 TA_{161}	—	October 9, 2005	Kitt Peak	Spacewatch	·	2.8 km	MPC · JPL
314358	2005 TU_{162}	—	October 9, 2005	Kitt Peak	Spacewatch	·	4.0 km	MPC · JPL
314359	2005 TA_{194}	—	October 1, 2005	Kitt Peak	Spacewatch	·	1.9 km	MPC · JPL
314360	2005 TJ_{195}	—	October 1, 2005	Kitt Peak	Spacewatch	·	1.8 km	MPC · JPL
314361	2005 TK_{197}	—	October 1, 2005	Catalina	CSS	EOS	2.9 km	MPC · JPL
314362	2005 UN_{4}	—	October 25, 2005	Socorro	LINEAR	EUP	5.1 km	MPC · JPL
314363	2005 UQ_{5}	—	October 25, 2005	Socorro	LINEAR	H	870 m	MPC · JPL
314364	2005 UA_{39}	—	October 24, 2005	Kitt Peak	Spacewatch	·	1.7 km	MPC · JPL
314365	2005 UB_{39}	—	October 24, 2005	Kitt Peak	Spacewatch	·	2.2 km	MPC · JPL
314366	2005 UM_{39}	—	October 24, 2005	Kitt Peak	Spacewatch	KOR	1.4 km	MPC · JPL
314367	2005 UO_{39}	—	October 24, 2005	Kitt Peak	Spacewatch	·	2.3 km	MPC · JPL
314368	2005 UR_{39}	—	October 24, 2005	Kitt Peak	Spacewatch	·	2.4 km	MPC · JPL
314369	2005 UH_{40}	—	October 24, 2005	Kitt Peak	Spacewatch	THM	2.6 km	MPC · JPL
314370	2005 UZ_{40}	—	October 24, 2005	Kitt Peak	Spacewatch	fast	2.9 km	MPC · JPL
314371	2005 UT_{42}	—	October 22, 2005	Kitt Peak	Spacewatch	·	2.2 km	MPC · JPL
314372	2005 UO_{46}	—	October 22, 2005	Kitt Peak	Spacewatch	EUP	4.3 km	MPC · JPL
314373	2005 UP_{46}	—	October 22, 2005	Catalina	CSS	EOS	2.8 km	MPC · JPL
314374	2005 UJ_{49}	—	October 23, 2005	Catalina	CSS	·	2.6 km	MPC · JPL
314375	2005 UJ_{66}	—	October 22, 2005	Kitt Peak	Spacewatch	·	3.6 km	MPC · JPL
314376	2005 UP_{70}	—	October 23, 2005	Catalina	CSS	EOS	2.8 km	MPC · JPL
314377	2005 UT_{70}	—	October 23, 2005	Catalina	CSS	·	3.1 km	MPC · JPL
314378	2005 UA_{77}	—	October 24, 2005	Palomar	NEAT	·	2.6 km	MPC · JPL
314379	2005 UO_{78}	—	October 25, 2005	Anderson Mesa	LONEOS	·	3.8 km	MPC · JPL
314380	2005 UX_{84}	—	October 22, 2005	Kitt Peak	Spacewatch	KOR	1.7 km	MPC · JPL
314381	2005 UA_{91}	—	October 22, 2005	Kitt Peak	Spacewatch	·	2.9 km	MPC · JPL
314382	2005 UD_{95}	—	October 22, 2005	Kitt Peak	Spacewatch	·	2.0 km	MPC · JPL
314383	2005 UZ_{99}	—	October 22, 2005	Kitt Peak	Spacewatch	·	2.3 km	MPC · JPL
314384	2005 UF_{101}	—	October 22, 2005	Kitt Peak	Spacewatch	·	2.2 km	MPC · JPL
314385	2005 UA_{103}	—	October 22, 2005	Kitt Peak	Spacewatch	·	2.9 km	MPC · JPL
314386	2005 US_{110}	—	October 22, 2005	Kitt Peak	Spacewatch	·	2.6 km	MPC · JPL
314387	2005 UL_{113}	—	October 22, 2005	Kitt Peak	Spacewatch	·	1.8 km	MPC · JPL
314388	2005 UW_{114}	—	October 22, 2005	Palomar	NEAT	·	5.5 km	MPC · JPL
314389	2005 UG_{135}	—	October 25, 2005	Kitt Peak	Spacewatch	KOR	1.4 km	MPC · JPL
314390	2005 UT_{138}	—	October 25, 2005	Kitt Peak	Spacewatch	·	2.8 km	MPC · JPL
314391	2005 UR_{159}	—	October 21, 2005	Palomar	NEAT	·	2.8 km	MPC · JPL
314392	2005 UQ_{161}	—	October 25, 2005	Kitt Peak	Spacewatch	·	2.8 km	MPC · JPL
314393	2005 UJ_{166}	—	October 24, 2005	Kitt Peak	Spacewatch	·	1.8 km	MPC · JPL
314394	2005 UT_{181}	—	October 24, 2005	Kitt Peak	Spacewatch	·	1.8 km	MPC · JPL
314395	2005 UW_{182}	—	October 24, 2005	Kitt Peak	Spacewatch	KOR	1.6 km	MPC · JPL
314396	2005 UR_{190}	—	October 27, 2005	Mount Lemmon	Mount Lemmon Survey	·	2.3 km	MPC · JPL
314397	2005 UJ_{199}	—	October 25, 2005	Kitt Peak	Spacewatch	·	2.0 km	MPC · JPL
314398	2005 UG_{200}	—	October 25, 2005	Kitt Peak	Spacewatch	·	1.7 km	MPC · JPL
314399	2005 UT_{205}	—	October 26, 2005	Kitt Peak	Spacewatch	·	2.3 km	MPC · JPL
314400	2005 UD_{208}	—	October 27, 2005	Kitt Peak	Spacewatch	KOR	1.4 km	MPC · JPL

== 314401–314500 ==
back to top

Designation			Discovery			Properties		Ref
Permanent	Provisional	Named after	Date	Site	Discoverer(s)	Category	Diam.	Ref
314401	2005 US_{218}	—	October 25, 2005	Kitt Peak	Spacewatch	·	2.0 km	MPC · JPL
314402	2005 UH_{225}	—	October 25, 2005	Kitt Peak	Spacewatch	AGN	1.5 km	MPC · JPL
314403	2005 UY_{237}	—	October 25, 2005	Kitt Peak	Spacewatch	·	2.1 km	MPC · JPL
314404	2005 UA_{251}	—	October 23, 2005	Catalina	CSS	TIR	3.0 km	MPC · JPL
314405	2005 UN_{252}	—	October 26, 2005	Kitt Peak	Spacewatch	EOS	3.1 km	MPC · JPL
314406	2005 UR_{253}	—	October 27, 2005	Mount Lemmon	Mount Lemmon Survey	EOS	3.2 km	MPC · JPL
314407	2005 UV_{275}	—	September 30, 2005	Mount Lemmon	Mount Lemmon Survey	·	1.6 km	MPC · JPL
314408	2005 UZ_{282}	—	October 26, 2005	Kitt Peak	Spacewatch	·	1.6 km	MPC · JPL
314409	2005 UE_{284}	—	October 26, 2005	Kitt Peak	Spacewatch	EOS	1.7 km	MPC · JPL
314410	2005 UT_{312}	—	October 29, 2005	Catalina	CSS	·	3.5 km	MPC · JPL
314411	2005 UY_{312}	—	October 29, 2005	Catalina	CSS	EMA	5.4 km	MPC · JPL
314412	2005 UZ_{315}	—	October 25, 2005	Kitt Peak	Spacewatch	·	1.8 km	MPC · JPL
314413	2005 UD_{323}	—	October 28, 2005	Mount Lemmon	Mount Lemmon Survey	·	2.9 km	MPC · JPL
314414	2005 UR_{327}	—	October 29, 2005	Kitt Peak	Spacewatch	·	2.9 km	MPC · JPL
314415	2005 UL_{347}	—	October 31, 2005	Kitt Peak	Spacewatch	·	1.9 km	MPC · JPL
314416	2005 UF_{349}	—	October 25, 2005	Catalina	CSS	·	3.7 km	MPC · JPL
314417	2005 UL_{350}	—	October 28, 2005	Catalina	CSS	HYG	3.3 km	MPC · JPL
314418	2005 UD_{370}	—	October 27, 2005	Kitt Peak	Spacewatch	·	4.2 km	MPC · JPL
314419	2005 UN_{372}	—	October 27, 2005	Kitt Peak	Spacewatch	·	4.3 km	MPC · JPL
314420	2005 UG_{374}	—	October 27, 2005	Kitt Peak	Spacewatch	·	1.7 km	MPC · JPL
314421	2005 UL_{398}	—	October 31, 2005	Anderson Mesa	LONEOS	EOS	2.4 km	MPC · JPL
314422	2005 UO_{414}	—	October 25, 2005	Kitt Peak	Spacewatch	KOR	1.5 km	MPC · JPL
314423	2005 UG_{417}	—	October 25, 2005	Kitt Peak	Spacewatch	·	2.9 km	MPC · JPL
314424	2005 UQ_{425}	—	October 28, 2005	Kitt Peak	Spacewatch	·	1.3 km	MPC · JPL
314425	2005 US_{429}	—	October 28, 2005	Kitt Peak	Spacewatch	·	2.8 km	MPC · JPL
314426	2005 UC_{441}	—	October 29, 2005	Palomar	NEAT	·	1.9 km	MPC · JPL
314427	2005 UA_{446}	—	October 31, 2005	Mount Lemmon	Mount Lemmon Survey	THM	2.3 km	MPC · JPL
314428	2005 UO_{447}	—	October 30, 2005	Kitt Peak	Spacewatch	KOR	1.4 km	MPC · JPL
314429	2005 UW_{449}	—	October 30, 2005	Mount Lemmon	Mount Lemmon Survey	·	2.6 km	MPC · JPL
314430	2005 UE_{477}	—	October 25, 2005	Kitt Peak	Spacewatch	·	2.5 km	MPC · JPL
314431	2005 UM_{480}	—	October 22, 2005	Palomar	NEAT	H	740 m	MPC · JPL
314432	2005 UR_{480}	—	October 24, 2005	Siding Spring	SSS	H	740 m	MPC · JPL
314433	2005 UO_{495}	—	October 26, 2005	Anderson Mesa	LONEOS	·	2.9 km	MPC · JPL
314434	2005 UW_{511}	—	October 28, 2005	Mount Lemmon	Mount Lemmon Survey	·	2.9 km	MPC · JPL
314435	2005 UU_{513}	—	October 24, 2005	Kitt Peak	Spacewatch	EOS	2.4 km	MPC · JPL
314436	2005 UX_{515}	—	October 22, 2005	Apache Point	A. C. Becker	·	2.0 km	MPC · JPL
314437	2005 UZ_{521}	—	October 26, 2005	Apache Point	A. C. Becker	·	1.7 km	MPC · JPL
314438	2005 UJ_{526}	—	October 25, 2005	Kitt Peak	Spacewatch	·	2.4 km	MPC · JPL
314439	2005 UH_{527}	—	October 25, 2005	Mount Lemmon	Mount Lemmon Survey	THM	2.5 km	MPC · JPL
314440	2005 UT_{530}	—	October 22, 2005	Kitt Peak	Spacewatch	EOS	1.8 km	MPC · JPL
314441	2005 VO_{15}	—	November 1, 2005	Catalina	CSS	·	3.3 km	MPC · JPL
314442	2005 VE_{16}	—	November 2, 2005	Socorro	LINEAR	·	4.3 km	MPC · JPL
314443	2005 VP_{25}	—	November 2, 2005	Socorro	LINEAR	·	3.1 km	MPC · JPL
314444	2005 VN_{50}	—	November 3, 2005	Catalina	CSS	·	2.0 km	MPC · JPL
314445	2005 VN_{59}	—	November 5, 2005	Kitt Peak	Spacewatch	·	1.9 km	MPC · JPL
314446	2005 VF_{65}	—	November 1, 2005	Mount Lemmon	Mount Lemmon Survey	·	2.0 km	MPC · JPL
314447	2005 VN_{79}	—	November 3, 2005	Socorro	LINEAR	·	4.9 km	MPC · JPL
314448	2005 VK_{87}	—	November 6, 2005	Kitt Peak	Spacewatch	·	2.3 km	MPC · JPL
314449	2005 VW_{91}	—	November 6, 2005	Mount Lemmon	Mount Lemmon Survey	EOS	2.3 km	MPC · JPL
314450	2005 VG_{103}	—	November 2, 2005	Mount Lemmon	Mount Lemmon Survey	LIX	3.9 km	MPC · JPL
314451	2005 VQ_{113}	—	November 10, 2005	Kitt Peak	Spacewatch	·	2.7 km	MPC · JPL
314452	2005 VR_{113}	—	November 10, 2005	Kitt Peak	Spacewatch	·	2.0 km	MPC · JPL
314453	2005 VX_{114}	—	November 11, 2005	Kitt Peak	Spacewatch	EOS	2.4 km	MPC · JPL
314454	2005 VR_{117}	—	November 11, 2005	Kitt Peak	Spacewatch	THM	3.2 km	MPC · JPL
314455	2005 VZ_{133}	—	November 1, 2005	Apache Point	A. C. Becker	·	2.4 km	MPC · JPL
314456	2005 VD_{134}	—	November 1, 2005	Apache Point	A. C. Becker	·	2.2 km	MPC · JPL
314457	2005 WL	—	November 20, 2005	Wrightwood	J. W. Young	·	2.0 km	MPC · JPL
314458	2005 WM_{1}	—	November 21, 2005	Socorro	LINEAR	T_{j} (2.98)	4.2 km	MPC · JPL
314459	2005 WQ_{6}	—	November 21, 2005	Catalina	CSS	·	3.4 km	MPC · JPL
314460	2005 WL_{8}	—	November 21, 2005	Kitt Peak	Spacewatch	·	2.4 km	MPC · JPL
314461	2005 WC_{9}	—	November 21, 2005	Kitt Peak	Spacewatch	·	2.3 km	MPC · JPL
314462	2005 WW_{17}	—	November 22, 2005	Kitt Peak	Spacewatch	·	3.2 km	MPC · JPL
314463	2005 WD_{20}	—	November 21, 2005	Kitt Peak	Spacewatch	·	2.0 km	MPC · JPL
314464	2005 WR_{32}	—	November 21, 2005	Kitt Peak	Spacewatch	EOS	2.4 km	MPC · JPL
314465	2005 WM_{44}	—	November 22, 2005	Kitt Peak	Spacewatch	·	3.1 km	MPC · JPL
314466	2005 WR_{58}	—	November 30, 2005	Junk Bond	D. Healy	(21885)	3.8 km	MPC · JPL
314467	2005 WM_{60}	—	November 24, 2005	Palomar	NEAT	·	3.5 km	MPC · JPL
314468	2005 WF_{67}	—	November 22, 2005	Kitt Peak	Spacewatch	·	2.1 km	MPC · JPL
314469	2005 WO_{69}	—	November 26, 2005	Kitt Peak	Spacewatch	EOS	2.0 km	MPC · JPL
314470	2005 WY_{71}	—	November 22, 2005	Kitt Peak	Spacewatch	·	2.2 km	MPC · JPL
314471	2005 WS_{72}	—	November 25, 2005	Kitt Peak	Spacewatch	EOS	2.6 km	MPC · JPL
314472	2005 WX_{72}	—	November 25, 2005	Kitt Peak	Spacewatch	·	3.2 km	MPC · JPL
314473	2005 WU_{78}	—	November 25, 2005	Kitt Peak	Spacewatch	·	2.3 km	MPC · JPL
314474	2005 WC_{82}	—	October 25, 2005	Mount Lemmon	Mount Lemmon Survey	·	3.8 km	MPC · JPL
314475	2005 WG_{90}	—	November 28, 2005	Socorro	LINEAR	·	3.0 km	MPC · JPL
314476	2005 WC_{94}	—	November 26, 2005	Kitt Peak	Spacewatch	·	2.7 km	MPC · JPL
314477	2005 WS_{97}	—	November 26, 2005	Mount Lemmon	Mount Lemmon Survey	·	3.2 km	MPC · JPL
314478	2005 WS_{98}	—	November 28, 2005	Palomar	NEAT	·	4.3 km	MPC · JPL
314479	2005 WO_{102}	—	November 24, 2005	Palomar	NEAT	·	3.8 km	MPC · JPL
314480	2005 WQ_{114}	—	November 28, 2005	Catalina	CSS	·	3.7 km	MPC · JPL
314481	2005 WE_{115}	—	November 29, 2005	Mount Lemmon	Mount Lemmon Survey	·	4.3 km	MPC · JPL
314482	2005 WO_{120}	—	November 29, 2005	Socorro	LINEAR	·	5.7 km	MPC · JPL
314483	2005 WJ_{131}	—	November 25, 2005	Mount Lemmon	Mount Lemmon Survey	·	1.9 km	MPC · JPL
314484	2005 WC_{137}	—	November 26, 2005	Mount Lemmon	Mount Lemmon Survey	·	2.0 km	MPC · JPL
314485	2005 WZ_{141}	—	November 29, 2005	Mount Lemmon	Mount Lemmon Survey	·	2.3 km	MPC · JPL
314486	2005 WZ_{142}	—	November 29, 2005	Socorro	LINEAR	·	5.2 km	MPC · JPL
314487	2005 WT_{145}	—	September 15, 2004	Kitt Peak	Spacewatch	·	2.5 km	MPC · JPL
314488	2005 WR_{165}	—	November 29, 2005	Mount Lemmon	Mount Lemmon Survey	THM	1.8 km	MPC · JPL
314489	2005 WW_{166}	—	November 29, 2005	Mount Lemmon	Mount Lemmon Survey	·	1.8 km	MPC · JPL
314490	2005 WO_{171}	—	November 30, 2005	Kitt Peak	Spacewatch	·	2.5 km	MPC · JPL
314491	2005 WU_{179}	—	November 21, 2005	Catalina	CSS	·	2.9 km	MPC · JPL
314492	2005 WD_{182}	—	November 25, 2005	Catalina	CSS	·	3.1 km	MPC · JPL
314493	2005 WH_{183}	—	November 28, 2005	Socorro	LINEAR	·	2.9 km	MPC · JPL
314494	2005 WW_{184}	—	November 29, 2005	Socorro	LINEAR	·	3.6 km	MPC · JPL
314495	2005 WQ_{186}	—	November 29, 2005	Kitt Peak	Spacewatch	·	2.7 km	MPC · JPL
314496	2005 WS_{190}	—	November 21, 2005	Anderson Mesa	LONEOS	·	4.1 km	MPC · JPL
314497	2005 WF_{191}	—	November 21, 2005	Catalina	CSS	·	2.7 km	MPC · JPL
314498	2005 WQ_{192}	—	November 26, 2005	Catalina	CSS	·	1.9 km	MPC · JPL
314499	2005 WL_{194}	—	November 29, 2005	Catalina	CSS	EUP	3.6 km	MPC · JPL
314500	2005 WS_{195}	—	November 25, 2005	Mount Lemmon	Mount Lemmon Survey	·	4.3 km	MPC · JPL

== 314501–314600 ==
back to top

Designation			Discovery			Properties		Ref
Permanent	Provisional	Named after	Date	Site	Discoverer(s)	Category	Diam.	Ref
314501	2005 WP_{198}	—	November 25, 2005	Kitt Peak	Spacewatch	·	2.9 km	MPC · JPL
314502	2005 WB_{208}	—	November 22, 2005	Kitt Peak	Spacewatch	THM	2.4 km	MPC · JPL
314503	2005 WB_{211}	—	November 22, 2005	Kitt Peak	Spacewatch	·	2.4 km	MPC · JPL
314504	2005 XL_{2}	—	December 1, 2005	Mount Lemmon	Mount Lemmon Survey	·	3.5 km	MPC · JPL
314505	2005 XV_{2}	—	December 1, 2005	Kitt Peak	Spacewatch	·	3.2 km	MPC · JPL
314506	2005 XG_{3}	—	December 1, 2005	Palomar	NEAT	EOS	2.5 km	MPC · JPL
314507	2005 XL_{24}	—	December 2, 2005	Catalina	CSS	H	680 m	MPC · JPL
314508	2005 XS_{30}	—	December 1, 2005	Kitt Peak	Spacewatch	·	3.9 km	MPC · JPL
314509	2005 XS_{34}	—	December 4, 2005	Kitt Peak	Spacewatch	·	4.2 km	MPC · JPL
314510	2005 XM_{36}	—	December 4, 2005	Kitt Peak	Spacewatch	·	2.3 km	MPC · JPL
314511	2005 XD_{57}	—	December 1, 2005	Kitt Peak	Spacewatch	TEL	1.9 km	MPC · JPL
314512	2005 XM_{67}	—	December 5, 2005	Socorro	LINEAR	EOS	4.0 km	MPC · JPL
314513	2005 XE_{69}	—	December 6, 2005	Kitt Peak	Spacewatch	·	4.3 km	MPC · JPL
314514	2005 XX_{70}	—	December 6, 2005	Catalina	CSS	TIR	3.5 km	MPC · JPL
314515	2005 XD_{79}	—	December 5, 2005	Socorro	LINEAR	·	4.3 km	MPC · JPL
314516	2005 XW_{82}	—	December 1, 2005	Anderson Mesa	LONEOS	·	3.1 km	MPC · JPL
314517	2005 XF_{90}	—	November 30, 2005	Kitt Peak	Spacewatch	·	3.3 km	MPC · JPL
314518	2005 YO_{1}	—	December 21, 2005	Catalina	CSS	THB	4.2 km	MPC · JPL
314519	2005 YM_{2}	—	December 21, 2005	Kitt Peak	Spacewatch	·	3.0 km	MPC · JPL
314520	2005 YP_{4}	—	December 21, 2005	Kitt Peak	Spacewatch	·	3.1 km	MPC · JPL
314521	2005 YH_{6}	—	December 21, 2005	Kitt Peak	Spacewatch	·	2.8 km	MPC · JPL
314522	2005 YF_{9}	—	December 21, 2005	Kitt Peak	Spacewatch	·	1.9 km	MPC · JPL
314523	2005 YC_{11}	—	December 21, 2005	Kitt Peak	Spacewatch	·	2.5 km	MPC · JPL
314524	2005 YS_{14}	—	December 22, 2005	Kitt Peak	Spacewatch	HYG	4.0 km	MPC · JPL
314525	2005 YP_{16}	—	December 22, 2005	Kitt Peak	Spacewatch	·	4.4 km	MPC · JPL
314526	2005 YW_{16}	—	December 22, 2005	Kitt Peak	Spacewatch	·	3.1 km	MPC · JPL
314527	2005 YH_{20}	—	December 24, 2005	Kitt Peak	Spacewatch	·	3.7 km	MPC · JPL
314528	2005 YX_{25}	—	December 24, 2005	Kitt Peak	Spacewatch	·	3.9 km	MPC · JPL
314529	2005 YH_{27}	—	December 22, 2005	Kitt Peak	Spacewatch	EOS	2.6 km	MPC · JPL
314530	2005 YR_{27}	—	December 22, 2005	Kitt Peak	Spacewatch	HYG	4.0 km	MPC · JPL
314531	2005 YS_{30}	—	December 22, 2005	Kitt Peak	Spacewatch	·	3.0 km	MPC · JPL
314532	2005 YQ_{41}	—	December 22, 2005	Kitt Peak	Spacewatch	·	5.9 km	MPC · JPL
314533	2005 YO_{42}	—	December 24, 2005	Kitt Peak	Spacewatch	VER	4.0 km	MPC · JPL
314534	2005 YD_{43}	—	December 24, 2005	Kitt Peak	Spacewatch	·	4.6 km	MPC · JPL
314535	2005 YU_{48}	—	December 22, 2005	Kitt Peak	Spacewatch	·	3.9 km	MPC · JPL
314536	2005 YM_{54}	—	December 25, 2005	Kitt Peak	Spacewatch	·	3.6 km	MPC · JPL
314537	2005 YS_{68}	—	December 26, 2005	Kitt Peak	Spacewatch	·	3.7 km	MPC · JPL
314538	2005 YU_{68}	—	December 26, 2005	Kitt Peak	Spacewatch	·	4.0 km	MPC · JPL
314539	2005 YQ_{73}	—	December 24, 2005	Kitt Peak	Spacewatch	·	5.4 km	MPC · JPL
314540	2005 YK_{82}	—	December 24, 2005	Kitt Peak	Spacewatch	·	4.6 km	MPC · JPL
314541	2005 YE_{84}	—	December 24, 2005	Kitt Peak	Spacewatch	·	5.0 km	MPC · JPL
314542	2005 YT_{90}	—	December 26, 2005	Mount Lemmon	Mount Lemmon Survey	·	4.0 km	MPC · JPL
314543	2005 YA_{92}	—	December 27, 2005	Mount Lemmon	Mount Lemmon Survey	·	3.1 km	MPC · JPL
314544	2005 YS_{94}	—	December 22, 2005	Palomar	NEAT	·	2.9 km	MPC · JPL
314545	2005 YY_{106}	—	December 25, 2005	Mount Lemmon	Mount Lemmon Survey	·	4.4 km	MPC · JPL
314546	2005 YJ_{113}	—	December 25, 2005	Mount Lemmon	Mount Lemmon Survey	HYG	4.1 km	MPC · JPL
314547	2005 YU_{113}	—	December 25, 2005	Kitt Peak	Spacewatch	·	3.7 km	MPC · JPL
314548	2005 YE_{118}	—	December 25, 2005	Kitt Peak	Spacewatch	(21885)	3.9 km	MPC · JPL
314549	2005 YW_{124}	—	December 26, 2005	Kitt Peak	Spacewatch	·	4.3 km	MPC · JPL
314550	2005 YA_{125}	—	December 26, 2005	Kitt Peak	Spacewatch	·	3.2 km	MPC · JPL
314551	2005 YE_{125}	—	December 26, 2005	Kitt Peak	Spacewatch	·	4.8 km	MPC · JPL
314552	2005 YS_{125}	—	December 26, 2005	Kitt Peak	Spacewatch	·	3.6 km	MPC · JPL
314553	2005 YP_{139}	—	December 28, 2005	Kitt Peak	Spacewatch	THM	2.4 km	MPC · JPL
314554	2005 YS_{153}	—	December 29, 2005	Socorro	LINEAR	·	4.2 km	MPC · JPL
314555	2005 YP_{155}	—	December 25, 2005	Mount Lemmon	Mount Lemmon Survey	·	2.9 km	MPC · JPL
314556	2005 YU_{155}	—	December 25, 2005	Catalina	CSS	·	6.0 km	MPC · JPL
314557	2005 YV_{158}	—	March 23, 1995	Kitt Peak	Spacewatch	·	2.7 km	MPC · JPL
314558	2005 YT_{160}	—	December 27, 2005	Kitt Peak	Spacewatch	·	3.6 km	MPC · JPL
314559	2005 YM_{163}	—	January 8, 1995	Kitt Peak	Spacewatch	·	3.9 km	MPC · JPL
314560	2005 YQ_{165}	—	December 25, 2005	Anderson Mesa	LONEOS	·	4.9 km	MPC · JPL
314561	2005 YK_{168}	—	December 29, 2005	Kitt Peak	Spacewatch	·	4.5 km	MPC · JPL
314562	2005 YX_{168}	—	December 30, 2005	Kitt Peak	Spacewatch	·	3.6 km	MPC · JPL
314563	2005 YQ_{169}	—	December 30, 2005	Socorro	LINEAR	TIR	4.0 km	MPC · JPL
314564	2005 YF_{176}	—	December 22, 2005	Kitt Peak	Spacewatch	EUP	5.1 km	MPC · JPL
314565	2005 YW_{176}	—	December 22, 2005	Kitt Peak	Spacewatch	·	3.0 km	MPC · JPL
314566	2005 YH_{180}	—	December 30, 2005	Socorro	LINEAR	·	3.6 km	MPC · JPL
314567	2005 YV_{181}	—	December 25, 2005	Anderson Mesa	LONEOS	TIR	3.9 km	MPC · JPL
314568	2005 YA_{182}	—	December 27, 2005	Socorro	LINEAR	(22805)	5.4 km	MPC · JPL
314569	2005 YH_{184}	—	December 27, 2005	Kitt Peak	Spacewatch	·	2.7 km	MPC · JPL
314570	2005 YN_{187}	—	December 28, 2005	Kitt Peak	Spacewatch	·	3.2 km	MPC · JPL
314571	2005 YX_{190}	—	December 30, 2005	Kitt Peak	Spacewatch	·	3.8 km	MPC · JPL
314572	2005 YV_{197}	—	December 25, 2005	Kitt Peak	Spacewatch	·	4.4 km	MPC · JPL
314573	2005 YF_{213}	—	December 29, 2005	Socorro	LINEAR	·	3.9 km	MPC · JPL
314574	2005 YX_{213}	—	December 29, 2005	Socorro	LINEAR	·	5.2 km	MPC · JPL
314575	2005 YJ_{214}	—	December 30, 2005	Catalina	CSS	·	4.0 km	MPC · JPL
314576	2005 YR_{215}	—	December 10, 2005	Kitt Peak	Spacewatch	EUP	4.3 km	MPC · JPL
314577	2005 YJ_{216}	—	December 29, 2005	Mount Lemmon	Mount Lemmon Survey	·	2.9 km	MPC · JPL
314578	2005 YZ_{220}	—	December 23, 2005	Socorro	LINEAR	·	4.2 km	MPC · JPL
314579	2005 YQ_{235}	—	December 28, 2005	Kitt Peak	Spacewatch	·	3.2 km	MPC · JPL
314580	2005 YG_{248}	—	December 31, 2005	Kitt Peak	Spacewatch	·	4.4 km	MPC · JPL
314581	2005 YA_{265}	—	December 25, 2005	Kitt Peak	Spacewatch	THM	2.8 km	MPC · JPL
314582	2005 YJ_{274}	—	December 30, 2005	Mount Lemmon	Mount Lemmon Survey	VER	4.0 km	MPC · JPL
314583	2005 YN_{288}	—	December 29, 2005	Mount Lemmon	Mount Lemmon Survey	·	2.2 km	MPC · JPL
314584	2006 AC_{8}	—	January 7, 2006	Anderson Mesa	LONEOS	THB	3.6 km	MPC · JPL
314585	2006 AQ_{9}	—	January 4, 2006	Mount Lemmon	Mount Lemmon Survey	·	3.6 km	MPC · JPL
314586	2006 AN_{10}	—	January 4, 2006	Mount Lemmon	Mount Lemmon Survey	·	3.6 km	MPC · JPL
314587	2006 AJ_{11}	—	January 4, 2006	Kitt Peak	Spacewatch	·	3.5 km	MPC · JPL
314588	2006 AW_{12}	—	January 5, 2006	Catalina	CSS	EOS	3.0 km	MPC · JPL
314589	2006 AW_{18}	—	January 5, 2006	Catalina	CSS	EUP	4.9 km	MPC · JPL
314590	2006 AZ_{18}	—	January 5, 2006	Kitt Peak	Spacewatch	HYG	3.4 km	MPC · JPL
314591	2006 AB_{26}	—	January 5, 2006	Socorro	LINEAR	VER	3.9 km	MPC · JPL
314592	2006 AK_{32}	—	April 13, 2001	Kitt Peak	Spacewatch	·	4.4 km	MPC · JPL
314593	2006 AO_{45}	—	January 2, 2006	Mount Lemmon	Mount Lemmon Survey	·	4.4 km	MPC · JPL
314594	2006 AV_{47}	—	January 7, 2006	Kitt Peak	Spacewatch	·	3.5 km	MPC · JPL
314595	2006 AS_{61}	—	January 5, 2006	Kitt Peak	Spacewatch	·	4.7 km	MPC · JPL
314596	2006 AT_{71}	—	January 6, 2006	Mount Lemmon	Mount Lemmon Survey	·	3.7 km	MPC · JPL
314597	2006 AP_{74}	—	January 6, 2006	Socorro	LINEAR	·	4.8 km	MPC · JPL
314598	2006 AV_{81}	—	January 5, 2006	Socorro	LINEAR	TIR	5.5 km	MPC · JPL
314599	2006 AX_{90}	—	December 22, 2005	Kitt Peak	Spacewatch	THM	1.8 km	MPC · JPL
314600	2006 AH_{97}	—	January 5, 2006	Catalina	CSS	·	2.7 km	MPC · JPL

== 314601–314700 ==
back to top

Designation			Discovery			Properties		Ref
Permanent	Provisional	Named after	Date	Site	Discoverer(s)	Category	Diam.	Ref
314601	2006 BE_{1}	—	January 20, 2006	Palomar	NEAT	·	3.9 km	MPC · JPL
314602	2006 BD_{6}	—	January 20, 2006	Catalina	CSS	·	4.7 km	MPC · JPL
314603	2006 BD_{28}	—	January 22, 2006	Mount Lemmon	Mount Lemmon Survey	CYB	2.8 km	MPC · JPL
314604	2006 BN_{57}	—	January 23, 2006	Kitt Peak	Spacewatch	·	4.7 km	MPC · JPL
314605	2006 BK_{73}	—	January 23, 2006	Kitt Peak	Spacewatch	·	2.8 km	MPC · JPL
314606	2006 BL_{150}	—	January 24, 2006	Anderson Mesa	LONEOS	·	1.3 km	MPC · JPL
314607	2006 BJ_{201}	—	January 31, 2006	Mount Lemmon	Mount Lemmon Survey	·	4.4 km	MPC · JPL
314608	2006 BQ_{274}	—	January 23, 2006	Kitt Peak	Spacewatch	·	4.0 km	MPC · JPL
314609	2006 BM_{278}	—	January 23, 2006	Kitt Peak	Spacewatch	·	4.4 km	MPC · JPL
314610	2006 CL_{44}	—	February 3, 2006	Kitt Peak	Spacewatch	LIX	4.0 km	MPC · JPL
314611	2006 DH_{12}	—	February 20, 2006	Mount Lemmon	Mount Lemmon Survey	·	3.9 km	MPC · JPL
314612	2006 DZ_{24}	—	February 20, 2006	Kitt Peak	Spacewatch	·	780 m	MPC · JPL
314613	2006 DQ_{51}	—	February 24, 2006	Kitt Peak	Spacewatch	·	3.8 km	MPC · JPL
314614	2006 DD_{59}	—	February 24, 2006	Mount Lemmon	Mount Lemmon Survey	V	850 m	MPC · JPL
314615	2006 DY_{91}	—	February 24, 2006	Mount Lemmon	Mount Lemmon Survey	·	720 m	MPC · JPL
314616	2006 DF_{104}	—	February 25, 2006	Mount Lemmon	Mount Lemmon Survey	·	1.1 km	MPC · JPL
314617	2006 DC_{121}	—	February 22, 2006	Catalina	CSS	·	4.8 km	MPC · JPL
314618	2006 DU_{123}	—	February 24, 2006	Mount Lemmon	Mount Lemmon Survey	·	3.0 km	MPC · JPL
314619	2006 DZ_{210}	—	February 24, 2006	Palomar	NEAT	·	5.6 km	MPC · JPL
314620	2006 EG_{62}	—	March 5, 2006	Kitt Peak	Spacewatch	·	790 m	MPC · JPL
314621	2006 FO_{7}	—	March 23, 2006	Kitt Peak	Spacewatch	·	680 m	MPC · JPL
314622	2006 FR_{11}	—	March 23, 2006	Kitt Peak	Spacewatch	·	700 m	MPC · JPL
314623	2006 FD_{29}	—	March 24, 2006	Mount Lemmon	Mount Lemmon Survey	·	670 m	MPC · JPL
314624	2006 FO_{41}	—	March 26, 2006	Mount Lemmon	Mount Lemmon Survey	·	980 m	MPC · JPL
314625	2006 FB_{54}	—	March 26, 2006	Mount Lemmon	Mount Lemmon Survey	·	640 m	MPC · JPL
314626	2006 GC_{13}	—	April 2, 2006	Kitt Peak	Spacewatch	·	640 m	MPC · JPL
314627	2006 GY_{26}	—	April 2, 2006	Kitt Peak	Spacewatch	V	700 m	MPC · JPL
314628	2006 HU_{2}	—	April 18, 2006	Kitt Peak	Spacewatch	·	990 m	MPC · JPL
314629	2006 HB_{9}	—	April 19, 2006	Kitt Peak	Spacewatch	·	800 m	MPC · JPL
314630	2006 HH_{16}	—	April 20, 2006	Kitt Peak	Spacewatch	·	740 m	MPC · JPL
314631	2006 HB_{17}	—	April 20, 2006	Catalina	CSS	·	4.8 km	MPC · JPL
314632	2006 HU_{39}	—	April 21, 2006	Catalina	CSS	·	1.1 km	MPC · JPL
314633	2006 HT_{46}	—	April 20, 2006	Kitt Peak	Spacewatch	·	750 m	MPC · JPL
314634	2006 HK_{63}	—	April 24, 2006	Kitt Peak	Spacewatch	·	1.5 km	MPC · JPL
314635	2006 HL_{101}	—	April 30, 2006	Kitt Peak	Spacewatch	·	1.5 km	MPC · JPL
314636	2006 HE_{102}	—	April 30, 2006	Kitt Peak	Spacewatch	·	590 m	MPC · JPL
314637	2006 JK	—	May 1, 2006	Reedy Creek	J. Broughton	·	1.1 km	MPC · JPL
314638	2006 JQ_{26}	—	May 5, 2006	Reedy Creek	J. Broughton	·	970 m	MPC · JPL
314639	2006 JX_{28}	—	May 3, 2006	Kitt Peak	Spacewatch	·	1.1 km	MPC · JPL
314640	2006 JW_{29}	—	May 3, 2006	Kitt Peak	Spacewatch	·	730 m	MPC · JPL
314641	2006 JM_{33}	—	May 4, 2006	Kitt Peak	Spacewatch	·	700 m	MPC · JPL
314642	2006 JY_{33}	—	May 4, 2006	Kitt Peak	Spacewatch	·	1.1 km	MPC · JPL
314643	2006 JZ_{44}	—	May 7, 2006	Mount Lemmon	Mount Lemmon Survey	·	1.0 km	MPC · JPL
314644	2006 KE_{7}	—	May 19, 2006	Mount Lemmon	Mount Lemmon Survey	·	670 m	MPC · JPL
314645	2006 KY_{11}	—	May 20, 2006	Kitt Peak	Spacewatch	·	1.4 km	MPC · JPL
314646	2006 KP_{27}	—	May 20, 2006	Kitt Peak	Spacewatch	·	1.8 km	MPC · JPL
314647	2006 KW_{101}	—	May 27, 2006	Kitt Peak	Spacewatch	3:2	6.6 km	MPC · JPL
314648	2006 KH_{112}	—	May 31, 2006	Mount Lemmon	Mount Lemmon Survey	·	830 m	MPC · JPL
314649	2006 KG_{144}	—	May 23, 2006	Mount Lemmon	Mount Lemmon Survey	·	600 m	MPC · JPL
314650 Neilnorman	2006 OC_{1}	Neilnorman	July 19, 2006	Roeser	Dawson, M.	·	2.6 km	MPC · JPL
314651	2006 OC_{2}	—	July 18, 2006	Lulin	LUSS	L4	10 km	MPC · JPL
314652	2006 OK_{2}	—	July 18, 2006	Lulin	LUSS	(2076)	950 m	MPC · JPL
314653	2006 OG_{4}	—	July 21, 2006	Mount Lemmon	Mount Lemmon Survey	·	1.5 km	MPC · JPL
314654	2006 OJ_{8}	—	July 20, 2006	Palomar	NEAT	·	1.5 km	MPC · JPL
314655	2006 OZ_{12}	—	July 20, 2006	Palomar	NEAT	·	2.0 km	MPC · JPL
314656	2006 OJ_{13}	—	July 21, 2006	Catalina	CSS	·	1.3 km	MPC · JPL
314657	2006 OW_{20}	—	July 25, 2006	Palomar	NEAT	·	1.9 km	MPC · JPL
314658	2006 PC_{3}	—	March 11, 2005	Mount Lemmon	Mount Lemmon Survey	V	950 m	MPC · JPL
314659	2006 PV_{9}	—	August 13, 2006	Palomar	NEAT	(1338) (FLO)	790 m	MPC · JPL
314660	2006 PG_{23}	—	August 12, 2006	Palomar	NEAT	NYS	1.2 km	MPC · JPL
314661	2006 QC_{12}	—	August 16, 2006	Siding Spring	SSS	·	1.6 km	MPC · JPL
314662	2006 QX_{13}	—	August 17, 2006	Palomar	NEAT	·	1.9 km	MPC · JPL
314663	2006 QH_{15}	—	August 17, 2006	Palomar	NEAT	V	990 m	MPC · JPL
314664	2006 QS_{15}	—	August 17, 2006	Palomar	NEAT	V	740 m	MPC · JPL
314665	2006 QZ_{24}	—	August 18, 2006	Socorro	LINEAR	·	1.4 km	MPC · JPL
314666	2006 QQ_{38}	—	August 18, 2006	Anderson Mesa	LONEOS	PHO	2.1 km	MPC · JPL
314667	2006 QR_{47}	—	August 20, 2006	Kitt Peak	Spacewatch	·	1.6 km	MPC · JPL
314668	2006 QB_{56}	—	August 18, 2006	Kitt Peak	Spacewatch	·	2.1 km	MPC · JPL
314669	2006 QW_{63}	—	August 24, 2006	Palomar	NEAT	·	1.3 km	MPC · JPL
314670	2006 QX_{77}	—	August 22, 2006	Palomar	NEAT	EUN	1.3 km	MPC · JPL
314671	2006 QN_{85}	—	August 27, 2006	Kitt Peak	Spacewatch	·	810 m	MPC · JPL
314672	2006 QP_{88}	—	August 27, 2006	Kitt Peak	Spacewatch	·	1.1 km	MPC · JPL
314673	2006 QT_{93}	—	August 16, 2006	Palomar	NEAT	V	720 m	MPC · JPL
314674	2006 QS_{99}	—	August 24, 2006	Palomar	NEAT	·	1.5 km	MPC · JPL
314675	2006 QK_{106}	—	August 28, 2006	Catalina	CSS	·	1.1 km	MPC · JPL
314676	2006 QM_{106}	—	August 28, 2006	Catalina	CSS	NYS	1.6 km	MPC · JPL
314677	2006 QU_{108}	—	August 28, 2006	Catalina	CSS	·	4.3 km	MPC · JPL
314678	2006 QJ_{114}	—	August 27, 2006	Anderson Mesa	LONEOS	V	810 m	MPC · JPL
314679	2006 QF_{126}	—	August 16, 2006	Palomar	NEAT	·	2.4 km	MPC · JPL
314680	2006 QF_{135}	—	August 27, 2006	Anderson Mesa	LONEOS	·	2.7 km	MPC · JPL
314681	2006 QL_{136}	—	August 29, 2006	Anderson Mesa	LONEOS	·	1.7 km	MPC · JPL
314682	2006 QQ_{142}	—	August 29, 2006	Anderson Mesa	LONEOS	·	3.7 km	MPC · JPL
314683	2006 QY_{145}	—	August 18, 2006	Kitt Peak	Spacewatch	·	1.3 km	MPC · JPL
314684	2006 QC_{156}	—	August 19, 2006	Kitt Peak	Spacewatch	·	1.4 km	MPC · JPL
314685	2006 QZ_{182}	—	August 19, 2006	Kitt Peak	Spacewatch	·	1.6 km	MPC · JPL
314686	2006 QS_{183}	—	August 29, 2006	Anderson Mesa	LONEOS	EUN	1.7 km	MPC · JPL
314687	2006 RK	—	September 2, 2006	Costitx	OAM	EUN	1.5 km	MPC · JPL
314688	2006 RX	—	September 1, 2006	Marly	Observatoire Naef	·	4.2 km	MPC · JPL
314689	2006 RT_{5}	—	September 14, 2006	Kitt Peak	Spacewatch	NYS	1.4 km	MPC · JPL
314690	2006 RD_{12}	—	September 13, 2006	Palomar	NEAT	·	2.6 km	MPC · JPL
314691	2006 RN_{28}	—	September 15, 2006	Kitt Peak	Spacewatch	·	1.2 km	MPC · JPL
314692	2006 RQ_{28}	—	September 15, 2006	Kitt Peak	Spacewatch	·	1.0 km	MPC · JPL
314693	2006 RH_{51}	—	September 14, 2006	Kitt Peak	Spacewatch	·	1.6 km	MPC · JPL
314694	2006 RS_{51}	—	September 14, 2006	Kitt Peak	Spacewatch	·	1.6 km	MPC · JPL
314695	2006 RF_{56}	—	September 14, 2006	Kitt Peak	Spacewatch	·	2.1 km	MPC · JPL
314696	2006 RQ_{66}	—	September 14, 2006	Kitt Peak	Spacewatch	·	2.0 km	MPC · JPL
314697	2006 RQ_{71}	—	September 15, 2006	Kitt Peak	Spacewatch	·	2.3 km	MPC · JPL
314698	2006 RZ_{72}	—	September 15, 2006	Kitt Peak	Spacewatch	MAS	930 m	MPC · JPL
314699	2006 RJ_{86}	—	September 15, 2006	Kitt Peak	Spacewatch	(5)	1.2 km	MPC · JPL
314700	2006 RB_{97}	—	September 15, 2006	Kitt Peak	Spacewatch	·	1.3 km	MPC · JPL

== 314701–314800 ==
back to top

Designation			Discovery			Properties		Ref
Permanent	Provisional	Named after	Date	Site	Discoverer(s)	Category	Diam.	Ref
314701	2006 RN_{100}	—	September 14, 2006	Catalina	CSS	·	2.0 km	MPC · JPL
314702	2006 RC_{101}	—	September 14, 2006	Palomar	NEAT	ADE	2.0 km	MPC · JPL
314703 Davidflynn	2006 RN_{107}	Davidflynn	September 14, 2006	Mauna Kea	Masiero, J.	·	1.4 km	MPC · JPL
314704	2006 RL_{121}	—	September 15, 2006	Kitt Peak	Spacewatch	·	1.8 km	MPC · JPL
314705	2006 SR	—	September 16, 2006	Catalina	CSS	·	2.6 km	MPC · JPL
314706	2006 SC_{1}	—	September 16, 2006	Kitt Peak	Spacewatch	·	880 m	MPC · JPL
314707	2006 SB_{2}	—	September 16, 2006	Catalina	CSS	·	1.7 km	MPC · JPL
314708	2006 SS_{6}	—	September 17, 2006	Hibiscus	S. F. Hönig	·	1.6 km	MPC · JPL
314709	2006 SY_{8}	—	September 17, 2006	Catalina	CSS	·	1.9 km	MPC · JPL
314710	2006 SH_{12}	—	September 16, 2006	Anderson Mesa	LONEOS	·	2.0 km	MPC · JPL
314711	2006 SP_{18}	—	September 17, 2006	Kitt Peak	Spacewatch	·	2.2 km	MPC · JPL
314712	2006 SL_{23}	—	September 18, 2006	Anderson Mesa	LONEOS	(1547)	1.9 km	MPC · JPL
314713	2006 SL_{24}	—	September 16, 2006	Catalina	CSS	EUN	1.5 km	MPC · JPL
314714	2006 SR_{27}	—	September 16, 2006	Catalina	CSS	·	1.9 km	MPC · JPL
314715	2006 SH_{50}	—	September 16, 2006	Anderson Mesa	LONEOS	KON	2.6 km	MPC · JPL
314716	2006 SX_{52}	—	September 19, 2006	Catalina	CSS	·	2.1 km	MPC · JPL
314717	2006 SV_{56}	—	September 20, 2006	Catalina	CSS	JUN	1.2 km	MPC · JPL
314718	2006 SB_{57}	—	September 18, 2006	Calvin-Rehoboth	Calvin College	·	1.5 km	MPC · JPL
314719	2006 SO_{62}	—	September 18, 2006	Catalina	CSS	·	1.8 km	MPC · JPL
314720	2006 SQ_{64}	—	September 22, 2006	San Marcello	San Marcello	·	1.9 km	MPC · JPL
314721	2006 SD_{71}	—	September 19, 2006	Kitt Peak	Spacewatch	·	2.1 km	MPC · JPL
314722	2006 SD_{72}	—	September 19, 2006	Kitt Peak	Spacewatch	·	1.4 km	MPC · JPL
314723	2006 SJ_{75}	—	September 19, 2006	Kitt Peak	Spacewatch	·	1.8 km	MPC · JPL
314724	2006 SY_{75}	—	September 19, 2006	Kitt Peak	Spacewatch	·	1.4 km	MPC · JPL
314725	2006 SB_{78}	—	September 23, 2006	Piszkéstető	K. Sárneczky, Kuli, Z.	·	1.2 km	MPC · JPL
314726	2006 SY_{78}	—	September 16, 2006	Catalina	CSS	·	1.7 km	MPC · JPL
314727	2006 SD_{84}	—	September 18, 2006	Kitt Peak	Spacewatch	·	1.4 km	MPC · JPL
314728	2006 SN_{84}	—	September 18, 2006	Kitt Peak	Spacewatch	(5)	1.1 km	MPC · JPL
314729	2006 SG_{90}	—	September 18, 2006	Kitt Peak	Spacewatch	·	1.5 km	MPC · JPL
314730	2006 SE_{91}	—	September 18, 2006	Kitt Peak	Spacewatch	·	1.3 km	MPC · JPL
314731	2006 SB_{92}	—	September 18, 2006	Kitt Peak	Spacewatch	·	2.2 km	MPC · JPL
314732	2006 SU_{96}	—	September 18, 2006	Kitt Peak	Spacewatch	·	1.3 km	MPC · JPL
314733	2006 SJ_{98}	—	September 18, 2006	Kitt Peak	Spacewatch	·	1.5 km	MPC · JPL
314734	2006 SY_{100}	—	September 19, 2006	Kitt Peak	Spacewatch	·	1.1 km	MPC · JPL
314735	2006 SO_{101}	—	September 19, 2006	Catalina	CSS	·	1.2 km	MPC · JPL
314736	2006 SB_{112}	—	September 22, 2006	Catalina	CSS	·	1.8 km	MPC · JPL
314737	2006 SD_{115}	—	September 24, 2006	Kitt Peak	Spacewatch	·	990 m	MPC · JPL
314738	2006 SV_{121}	—	September 19, 2006	Catalina	CSS	·	1.6 km	MPC · JPL
314739	2006 SX_{122}	—	September 19, 2006	Catalina	CSS	·	1.6 km	MPC · JPL
314740	2006 SC_{127}	—	September 24, 2006	Anderson Mesa	LONEOS	·	1.7 km	MPC · JPL
314741	2006 SR_{127}	—	September 24, 2006	Anderson Mesa	LONEOS	·	1.8 km	MPC · JPL
314742	2006 SX_{143}	—	September 19, 2006	Kitt Peak	Spacewatch	·	1.0 km	MPC · JPL
314743	2006 SX_{147}	—	September 19, 2006	Kitt Peak	Spacewatch	·	1.2 km	MPC · JPL
314744	2006 SZ_{159}	—	September 23, 2006	Kitt Peak	Spacewatch	·	1.5 km	MPC · JPL
314745	2006 SK_{168}	—	September 25, 2006	Kitt Peak	Spacewatch	·	1.9 km	MPC · JPL
314746	2006 SR_{184}	—	September 25, 2006	Mount Lemmon	Mount Lemmon Survey	·	2.3 km	MPC · JPL
314747	2006 SE_{188}	—	September 26, 2006	Kitt Peak	Spacewatch	·	1.5 km	MPC · JPL
314748	2006 SX_{197}	—	September 27, 2006	Vail-Jarnac	Jarnac	·	2.5 km	MPC · JPL
314749	2006 SV_{201}	—	September 24, 2006	Kitt Peak	Spacewatch	·	1.2 km	MPC · JPL
314750	2006 SE_{209}	—	September 26, 2006	Kitt Peak	Spacewatch	·	2.0 km	MPC · JPL
314751	2006 SF_{217}	—	September 28, 2006	Kitt Peak	Spacewatch	·	1.4 km	MPC · JPL
314752	2006 SA_{239}	—	September 26, 2006	Mount Lemmon	Mount Lemmon Survey	NYS	1.3 km	MPC · JPL
314753	2006 SD_{259}	—	September 26, 2006	Kitt Peak	Spacewatch	·	1.3 km	MPC · JPL
314754	2006 SA_{298}	—	October 13, 1998	Kitt Peak	Spacewatch	·	1.4 km	MPC · JPL
314755	2006 SS_{310}	—	September 27, 2006	Kitt Peak	Spacewatch	·	1.3 km	MPC · JPL
314756	2006 SH_{319}	—	September 27, 2006	Kitt Peak	Spacewatch	(5)	1.4 km	MPC · JPL
314757	2006 SD_{324}	—	September 27, 2006	Kitt Peak	Spacewatch	·	2.1 km	MPC · JPL
314758	2006 SD_{326}	—	September 27, 2006	Kitt Peak	Spacewatch	·	1.2 km	MPC · JPL
314759	2006 ST_{328}	—	September 27, 2006	Kitt Peak	Spacewatch	·	1.3 km	MPC · JPL
314760	2006 SG_{329}	—	September 27, 2006	Kitt Peak	Spacewatch	·	1.2 km	MPC · JPL
314761	2006 SO_{333}	—	September 28, 2006	Kitt Peak	Spacewatch	·	1.2 km	MPC · JPL
314762	2006 SP_{337}	—	September 28, 2006	Kitt Peak	Spacewatch	·	1.8 km	MPC · JPL
314763	2006 SE_{340}	—	September 28, 2006	Kitt Peak	Spacewatch	·	1.4 km	MPC · JPL
314764	2006 SF_{340}	—	September 28, 2006	Kitt Peak	Spacewatch	(5)	1.2 km	MPC · JPL
314765	2006 SP_{349}	—	September 29, 2006	Anderson Mesa	LONEOS	EUN	2.4 km	MPC · JPL
314766	2006 SH_{354}	—	September 30, 2006	Catalina	CSS	·	1.7 km	MPC · JPL
314767	2006 SY_{357}	—	September 30, 2006	Mount Lemmon	Mount Lemmon Survey	·	1.4 km	MPC · JPL
314768	2006 SN_{360}	—	September 30, 2006	Mount Lemmon	Mount Lemmon Survey	·	1.2 km	MPC · JPL
314769	2006 SQ_{362}	—	September 30, 2006	Mount Lemmon	Mount Lemmon Survey	·	2.3 km	MPC · JPL
314770	2006 SW_{362}	—	September 30, 2006	Mount Lemmon	Mount Lemmon Survey	·	2.0 km	MPC · JPL
314771	2006 SD_{367}	—	September 25, 2006	Catalina	CSS	EUN	1.8 km	MPC · JPL
314772	2006 SB_{372}	—	September 27, 2006	Mount Lemmon	Mount Lemmon Survey	·	1.2 km	MPC · JPL
314773	2006 SC_{379}	—	September 18, 2006	Apache Point	A. C. Becker	·	2.2 km	MPC · JPL
314774	2006 SE_{390}	—	September 30, 2006	Apache Point	A. C. Becker	EUN	1.3 km	MPC · JPL
314775	2006 SO_{390}	—	September 30, 2006	Apache Point	A. C. Becker	·	2.0 km	MPC · JPL
314776	2006 SR_{390}	—	September 16, 2006	Kitt Peak	Spacewatch	MIS	2.7 km	MPC · JPL
314777	2006 SM_{391}	—	September 18, 2006	Kitt Peak	Spacewatch	EUN	1.3 km	MPC · JPL
314778	2006 SF_{397}	—	September 19, 2006	Kitt Peak	Spacewatch	·	1.2 km	MPC · JPL
314779	2006 SA_{398}	—	September 27, 2006	Mount Lemmon	Mount Lemmon Survey	·	1.6 km	MPC · JPL
314780	2006 SZ_{401}	—	September 27, 2006	Kitt Peak	Spacewatch	KON	2.7 km	MPC · JPL
314781	2006 SJ_{402}	—	September 25, 2006	Mount Lemmon	Mount Lemmon Survey	·	1.1 km	MPC · JPL
314782	2006 SH_{413}	—	September 22, 2006	Catalina	CSS	·	2.8 km	MPC · JPL
314783	2006 TM_{14}	—	October 10, 2006	Palomar	NEAT	·	1.7 km	MPC · JPL
314784	2006 TC_{17}	—	October 11, 2006	Kitt Peak	Spacewatch	·	1.5 km	MPC · JPL
314785	2006 TM_{17}	—	October 11, 2006	Kitt Peak	Spacewatch	·	2.0 km	MPC · JPL
314786	2006 TU_{17}	—	October 11, 2006	Kitt Peak	Spacewatch	·	1.6 km	MPC · JPL
314787	2006 TF_{18}	—	October 11, 2006	Kitt Peak	Spacewatch	·	2.7 km	MPC · JPL
314788	2006 TO_{18}	—	October 11, 2006	Kitt Peak	Spacewatch	·	1.4 km	MPC · JPL
314789	2006 TH_{19}	—	September 28, 2006	Mount Lemmon	Mount Lemmon Survey	·	1.9 km	MPC · JPL
314790	2006 TT_{20}	—	October 11, 2006	Kitt Peak	Spacewatch	·	1.6 km	MPC · JPL
314791	2006 TJ_{35}	—	October 12, 2006	Kitt Peak	Spacewatch	NEM	2.3 km	MPC · JPL
314792	2006 TD_{36}	—	October 12, 2006	Kitt Peak	Spacewatch	·	1.8 km	MPC · JPL
314793	2006 TW_{37}	—	October 12, 2006	Kitt Peak	Spacewatch	·	1.5 km	MPC · JPL
314794	2006 TP_{38}	—	October 12, 2006	Kitt Peak	Spacewatch	·	1.8 km	MPC · JPL
314795	2006 TN_{42}	—	October 12, 2006	Kitt Peak	Spacewatch	·	2.5 km	MPC · JPL
314796	2006 TZ_{45}	—	October 12, 2006	Kitt Peak	Spacewatch	·	1.6 km	MPC · JPL
314797	2006 TX_{46}	—	October 12, 2006	Kitt Peak	Spacewatch	·	2.5 km	MPC · JPL
314798	2006 TC_{50}	—	October 12, 2006	Palomar	NEAT	·	1.5 km	MPC · JPL
314799	2006 TT_{52}	—	October 12, 2006	Kitt Peak	Spacewatch	(13314)	2.4 km	MPC · JPL
314800	2006 TF_{62}	—	October 9, 2006	Palomar	NEAT	EUN	1.3 km	MPC · JPL

== 314801–314900 ==
back to top

Designation			Discovery			Properties		Ref
Permanent	Provisional	Named after	Date	Site	Discoverer(s)	Category	Diam.	Ref
314801	2006 TC_{72}	—	October 11, 2006	Palomar	NEAT	EUN	1.6 km	MPC · JPL
314802	2006 TQ_{76}	—	October 11, 2006	Palomar	NEAT	MAR	1.3 km	MPC · JPL
314803	2006 TE_{82}	—	October 13, 2006	Kitt Peak	Spacewatch	·	3.5 km	MPC · JPL
314804	2006 TS_{93}	—	October 15, 2006	Kitt Peak	Spacewatch	·	1.4 km	MPC · JPL
314805	2006 TP_{94}	—	October 15, 2006	Lulin	Lin, C.-S., Q. Ye	·	1.9 km	MPC · JPL
314806	2006 TJ_{95}	—	October 2, 2006	Siding Spring	SSS	(116763)	2.5 km	MPC · JPL
314807	2006 TL_{100}	—	October 15, 2006	Kitt Peak	Spacewatch	·	1.7 km	MPC · JPL
314808 Martindutertre	2006 TQ_{105}	Martindutertre	October 15, 2006	San Marcello	L. Tesi, Fagioli, G.	MAR	2.1 km	MPC · JPL
314809	2006 UL_{2}	—	October 16, 2006	Kitt Peak	Spacewatch	·	1.9 km	MPC · JPL
314810	2006 UK_{6}	—	October 16, 2006	Catalina	CSS	·	1.8 km	MPC · JPL
314811	2006 UD_{13}	—	October 17, 2006	Mount Lemmon	Mount Lemmon Survey	·	1.6 km	MPC · JPL
314812	2006 UW_{13}	—	October 17, 2006	Mount Lemmon	Mount Lemmon Survey	·	1.5 km	MPC · JPL
314813	2006 UY_{26}	—	October 16, 2006	Kitt Peak	Spacewatch	·	1.2 km	MPC · JPL
314814	2006 US_{32}	—	October 16, 2006	Kitt Peak	Spacewatch	·	1.4 km	MPC · JPL
314815	2006 UM_{42}	—	October 16, 2006	Kitt Peak	Spacewatch	·	1.8 km	MPC · JPL
314816	2006 UF_{43}	—	October 16, 2006	Kitt Peak	Spacewatch	·	1.9 km	MPC · JPL
314817	2006 UL_{45}	—	October 16, 2006	Kitt Peak	Spacewatch	·	1.8 km	MPC · JPL
314818	2006 UR_{45}	—	October 16, 2006	Kitt Peak	Spacewatch	AGN	1.0 km	MPC · JPL
314819	2006 UN_{46}	—	October 16, 2006	Kitt Peak	Spacewatch	·	1.7 km	MPC · JPL
314820	2006 UK_{47}	—	October 16, 2006	Bergisch Gladbach	W. Bickel	NYS	1.6 km	MPC · JPL
314821	2006 UT_{50}	—	October 17, 2006	Kitt Peak	Spacewatch	·	1.6 km	MPC · JPL
314822	2006 UE_{69}	—	October 16, 2006	Catalina	CSS	·	3.0 km	MPC · JPL
314823	2006 UG_{69}	—	October 16, 2006	Catalina	CSS	·	1.9 km	MPC · JPL
314824	2006 UW_{70}	—	October 16, 2006	Catalina	CSS	·	2.1 km	MPC · JPL
314825	2006 UJ_{77}	—	October 17, 2006	Kitt Peak	Spacewatch	·	1.8 km	MPC · JPL
314826	2006 UZ_{78}	—	October 17, 2006	Kitt Peak	Spacewatch	·	1.3 km	MPC · JPL
314827	2006 UN_{84}	—	October 17, 2006	Mount Lemmon	Mount Lemmon Survey	·	1.8 km	MPC · JPL
314828	2006 UT_{101}	—	October 18, 2006	Kitt Peak	Spacewatch	·	1.5 km	MPC · JPL
314829	2006 UY_{101}	—	October 18, 2006	Kitt Peak	Spacewatch	·	1.2 km	MPC · JPL
314830	2006 US_{103}	—	October 18, 2006	Kitt Peak	Spacewatch	·	1.8 km	MPC · JPL
314831	2006 UR_{104}	—	October 18, 2006	Kitt Peak	Spacewatch	·	1.2 km	MPC · JPL
314832	2006 UH_{106}	—	October 18, 2006	Kitt Peak	Spacewatch	PAD	1.9 km	MPC · JPL
314833	2006 UK_{107}	—	October 18, 2006	Kitt Peak	Spacewatch	·	2.2 km	MPC · JPL
314834	2006 UQ_{107}	—	October 18, 2006	Kitt Peak	Spacewatch	MAR	1.5 km	MPC · JPL
314835	2006 UQ_{129}	—	October 19, 2006	Kitt Peak	Spacewatch	·	1.3 km	MPC · JPL
314836	2006 UK_{131}	—	October 19, 2006	Kitt Peak	Spacewatch	·	1.7 km	MPC · JPL
314837	2006 UQ_{136}	—	October 19, 2006	Mount Lemmon	Mount Lemmon Survey	·	1.8 km	MPC · JPL
314838	2006 UZ_{165}	—	October 21, 2006	Mount Lemmon	Mount Lemmon Survey	·	1.5 km	MPC · JPL
314839	2006 UE_{167}	—	October 21, 2006	Mount Lemmon	Mount Lemmon Survey	·	1.1 km	MPC · JPL
314840	2006 UL_{168}	—	October 21, 2006	Mount Lemmon	Mount Lemmon Survey	·	1.6 km	MPC · JPL
314841	2006 UG_{178}	—	October 16, 2006	Catalina	CSS	HNS	1.7 km	MPC · JPL
314842	2006 UT_{178}	—	September 30, 2006	Catalina	CSS	·	1.8 km	MPC · JPL
314843	2006 UT_{181}	—	January 10, 1999	Xinglong	SCAP	·	1.9 km	MPC · JPL
314844	2006 UT_{183}	—	October 17, 2006	Catalina	CSS	·	1.7 km	MPC · JPL
314845	2006 UP_{184}	—	October 20, 2006	Catalina	CSS	EUN	1.4 km	MPC · JPL
314846	2006 UE_{187}	—	October 19, 2006	Catalina	CSS	·	1.7 km	MPC · JPL
314847	2006 UP_{187}	—	October 19, 2006	Catalina	CSS	EUN	1.4 km	MPC · JPL
314848	2006 UQ_{192}	—	October 19, 2006	Catalina	CSS	EUN	1.7 km	MPC · JPL
314849	2006 UC_{193}	—	October 19, 2006	Palomar	NEAT	·	3.1 km	MPC · JPL
314850	2006 UL_{197}	—	October 20, 2006	Kitt Peak	Spacewatch	·	1.6 km	MPC · JPL
314851	2006 UZ_{199}	—	October 21, 2006	Catalina	CSS	·	1.6 km	MPC · JPL
314852	2006 UT_{200}	—	October 21, 2006	Kitt Peak	Spacewatch	·	2.0 km	MPC · JPL
314853	2006 UH_{216}	—	October 29, 2006	Kitami	K. Endate	·	1.6 km	MPC · JPL
314854	2006 UE_{229}	—	October 20, 2006	Palomar	NEAT	AEO	1.6 km	MPC · JPL
314855	2006 UM_{231}	—	October 21, 2006	Palomar	NEAT	(5)	1.3 km	MPC · JPL
314856	2006 UG_{232}	—	October 21, 2006	Palomar	NEAT	·	1.7 km	MPC · JPL
314857	2006 UK_{233}	—	October 21, 2006	Palomar	NEAT	MIS	3.5 km	MPC · JPL
314858	2006 UG_{237}	—	October 23, 2006	Kitt Peak	Spacewatch	·	1.9 km	MPC · JPL
314859	2006 US_{239}	—	October 23, 2006	Kitt Peak	Spacewatch	·	1.4 km	MPC · JPL
314860	2006 UH_{244}	—	October 27, 2006	Mount Lemmon	Mount Lemmon Survey	·	1.1 km	MPC · JPL
314861	2006 UJ_{248}	—	October 27, 2006	Mount Lemmon	Mount Lemmon Survey	·	1.3 km	MPC · JPL
314862	2006 UV_{252}	—	October 27, 2006	Mount Lemmon	Mount Lemmon Survey	·	1.4 km	MPC · JPL
314863	2006 UX_{252}	—	October 27, 2006	Mount Lemmon	Mount Lemmon Survey	·	1.4 km	MPC · JPL
314864	2006 UV_{253}	—	October 27, 2006	Catalina	CSS	·	2.6 km	MPC · JPL
314865	2006 UQ_{259}	—	October 28, 2006	Mount Lemmon	Mount Lemmon Survey	·	1.6 km	MPC · JPL
314866	2006 UD_{265}	—	October 27, 2006	Catalina	CSS	·	1.5 km	MPC · JPL
314867	2006 UF_{270}	—	October 27, 2006	Mount Lemmon	Mount Lemmon Survey	·	1.5 km	MPC · JPL
314868	2006 UC_{274}	—	October 27, 2006	Kitt Peak	Spacewatch	EUN	1.5 km	MPC · JPL
314869	2006 UM_{278}	—	October 28, 2006	Kitt Peak	Spacewatch	·	1.6 km	MPC · JPL
314870	2006 UD_{280}	—	October 28, 2006	Mount Lemmon	Mount Lemmon Survey	(29841)	1.3 km	MPC · JPL
314871	2006 UH_{288}	—	October 29, 2006	Catalina	CSS	·	2.4 km	MPC · JPL
314872	2006 UH_{328}	—	October 17, 2006	Catalina	CSS	·	2.2 km	MPC · JPL
314873	2006 UX_{334}	—	October 21, 2006	Kitt Peak	Spacewatch	MIS	2.6 km	MPC · JPL
314874	2006 VE_{4}	—	November 9, 2006	Kitt Peak	Spacewatch	·	2.5 km	MPC · JPL
314875	2006 VA_{8}	—	November 10, 2006	Kitt Peak	Spacewatch	·	2.5 km	MPC · JPL
314876	2006 VB_{15}	—	November 9, 2006	Kitt Peak	Spacewatch	·	1.5 km	MPC · JPL
314877	2006 VC_{20}	—	November 9, 2006	Kitt Peak	Spacewatch	·	1.8 km	MPC · JPL
314878	2006 VL_{22}	—	November 10, 2006	Kitt Peak	Spacewatch	·	1.8 km	MPC · JPL
314879	2006 VC_{23}	—	November 10, 2006	Kitt Peak	Spacewatch	·	1.6 km	MPC · JPL
314880	2006 VA_{29}	—	November 10, 2006	Kitt Peak	Spacewatch	·	2.3 km	MPC · JPL
314881	2006 VE_{33}	—	November 11, 2006	Catalina	CSS	·	2.5 km	MPC · JPL
314882	2006 VV_{37}	—	November 11, 2006	Palomar	NEAT	·	2.9 km	MPC · JPL
314883	2006 VZ_{38}	—	November 12, 2006	Mount Lemmon	Mount Lemmon Survey	KOR	1.3 km	MPC · JPL
314884	2006 VU_{46}	—	November 9, 2006	Kitt Peak	Spacewatch	·	2.5 km	MPC · JPL
314885	2006 VJ_{47}	—	November 9, 2006	Kitt Peak	Spacewatch	WIT	900 m	MPC · JPL
314886	2006 VL_{47}	—	November 9, 2006	Kitt Peak	Spacewatch	·	1.4 km	MPC · JPL
314887	2006 VX_{47}	—	November 10, 2006	Kitt Peak	Spacewatch	·	1.2 km	MPC · JPL
314888	2006 VR_{51}	—	November 10, 2006	Kitt Peak	Spacewatch	·	2.5 km	MPC · JPL
314889	2006 VQ_{53}	—	November 11, 2006	Kitt Peak	Spacewatch	·	1.7 km	MPC · JPL
314890	2006 VP_{59}	—	November 11, 2006	Kitt Peak	Spacewatch	·	1.8 km	MPC · JPL
314891	2006 VE_{60}	—	November 11, 2006	Kitt Peak	Spacewatch	·	1.6 km	MPC · JPL
314892	2006 VU_{65}	—	November 11, 2006	Kitt Peak	Spacewatch	·	2.1 km	MPC · JPL
314893	2006 VK_{69}	—	November 11, 2006	Kitt Peak	Spacewatch	·	1.5 km	MPC · JPL
314894	2006 VL_{70}	—	November 11, 2006	Kitt Peak	Spacewatch	·	2.0 km	MPC · JPL
314895	2006 VN_{71}	—	November 11, 2006	Mount Lemmon	Mount Lemmon Survey	·	1.5 km	MPC · JPL
314896	2006 VE_{77}	—	November 12, 2006	Mount Lemmon	Mount Lemmon Survey	EUN	1.6 km	MPC · JPL
314897	2006 VB_{79}	—	November 12, 2006	Mount Lemmon	Mount Lemmon Survey	·	1.6 km	MPC · JPL
314898	2006 VJ_{83}	—	November 13, 2006	Kitt Peak	Spacewatch	·	1.5 km	MPC · JPL
314899	2006 VZ_{83}	—	November 13, 2006	Mount Lemmon	Mount Lemmon Survey	·	1.2 km	MPC · JPL
314900	2006 VB_{89}	—	November 14, 2006	Socorro	LINEAR	615	1.9 km	MPC · JPL

== 314901–315000 ==
back to top

Designation			Discovery			Properties		Ref
Permanent	Provisional	Named after	Date	Site	Discoverer(s)	Category	Diam.	Ref
314901	2006 VT_{93}	—	November 15, 2006	Mount Lemmon	Mount Lemmon Survey	·	1.9 km	MPC · JPL
314902	2006 VA_{95}	—	November 15, 2006	Wildberg	R. Apitzsch	·	1.8 km	MPC · JPL
314903	2006 VP_{102}	—	November 12, 2006	Mount Lemmon	Mount Lemmon Survey	EUN	1.6 km	MPC · JPL
314904	2006 VV_{102}	—	November 12, 2006	Mount Lemmon	Mount Lemmon Survey	·	3.6 km	MPC · JPL
314905	2006 VN_{106}	—	October 17, 2006	Catalina	CSS	·	2.2 km	MPC · JPL
314906	2006 VY_{116}	—	November 14, 2006	Kitt Peak	Spacewatch	·	1.6 km	MPC · JPL
314907	2006 VB_{117}	—	November 14, 2006	Kitt Peak	Spacewatch	(11882)	1.6 km	MPC · JPL
314908	2006 VQ_{119}	—	November 14, 2006	Kitt Peak	Spacewatch	·	1.6 km	MPC · JPL
314909	2006 VR_{119}	—	November 14, 2006	Kitt Peak	Spacewatch	·	1.8 km	MPC · JPL
314910	2006 VX_{139}	—	November 15, 2006	Kitt Peak	Spacewatch	·	2.1 km	MPC · JPL
314911	2006 VZ_{144}	—	November 15, 2006	Catalina	CSS	526	2.9 km	MPC · JPL
314912	2006 VQ_{145}	—	November 15, 2006	Catalina	CSS	·	2.3 km	MPC · JPL
314913	2006 VB_{152}	—	November 9, 2006	Palomar	NEAT	WIT	1.2 km	MPC · JPL
314914	2006 VT_{154}	—	November 8, 2006	Palomar	NEAT	·	2.9 km	MPC · JPL
314915	2006 VS_{170}	—	November 1, 2006	Kitt Peak	Spacewatch	·	3.2 km	MPC · JPL
314916	2006 WC_{9}	—	November 16, 2006	Kitt Peak	Spacewatch	·	4.0 km	MPC · JPL
314917	2006 WR_{12}	—	November 16, 2006	Mount Lemmon	Mount Lemmon Survey	MRX	960 m	MPC · JPL
314918	2006 WB_{16}	—	November 17, 2006	Kitt Peak	Spacewatch	·	1.6 km	MPC · JPL
314919	2006 WP_{19}	—	November 17, 2006	Mount Lemmon	Mount Lemmon Survey	·	1.6 km	MPC · JPL
314920	2006 WR_{24}	—	November 17, 2006	Mount Lemmon	Mount Lemmon Survey	·	1.7 km	MPC · JPL
314921	2006 WN_{25}	—	November 17, 2006	Mount Lemmon	Mount Lemmon Survey	·	2.3 km	MPC · JPL
314922	2006 WE_{29}	—	November 21, 2006	Great Shefford	Birtwhistle, P.	MAR	1.5 km	MPC · JPL
314923	2006 WX_{31}	—	November 16, 2006	Catalina	CSS	·	2.1 km	MPC · JPL
314924	2006 WM_{33}	—	November 16, 2006	Kitt Peak	Spacewatch	·	1.4 km	MPC · JPL
314925	2006 WW_{38}	—	November 16, 2006	Kitt Peak	Spacewatch	·	1.7 km	MPC · JPL
314926	2006 WJ_{41}	—	November 16, 2006	Kitt Peak	Spacewatch	·	1.7 km	MPC · JPL
314927	2006 WT_{48}	—	October 16, 2001	Palomar	NEAT	·	2.3 km	MPC · JPL
314928	2006 WX_{49}	—	May 10, 2004	Kitt Peak	Spacewatch	·	2.2 km	MPC · JPL
314929	2006 WC_{53}	—	November 16, 2006	Catalina	CSS	·	1.8 km	MPC · JPL
314930	2006 WN_{53}	—	November 16, 2006	Catalina	CSS	·	2.3 km	MPC · JPL
314931	2006 WZ_{53}	—	November 16, 2006	Kitt Peak	Spacewatch	·	2.7 km	MPC · JPL
314932	2006 WL_{54}	—	November 16, 2006	Kitt Peak	Spacewatch	·	1.8 km	MPC · JPL
314933	2006 WY_{65}	—	November 17, 2006	Kitt Peak	Spacewatch	·	3.6 km	MPC · JPL
314934	2006 WX_{66}	—	November 17, 2006	Mount Lemmon	Mount Lemmon Survey	·	1.9 km	MPC · JPL
314935	2006 WP_{68}	—	November 17, 2006	Mount Lemmon	Mount Lemmon Survey	·	2.3 km	MPC · JPL
314936	2006 WD_{83}	—	November 18, 2006	Kitt Peak	Spacewatch	·	1.9 km	MPC · JPL
314937	2006 WL_{93}	—	November 19, 2006	Kitt Peak	Spacewatch	·	2.1 km	MPC · JPL
314938	2006 WY_{97}	—	November 19, 2006	Kitt Peak	Spacewatch	·	2.0 km	MPC · JPL
314939	2006 WG_{98}	—	November 19, 2006	Kitt Peak	Spacewatch	·	2.0 km	MPC · JPL
314940	2006 WY_{99}	—	November 19, 2006	Catalina	CSS	·	2.5 km	MPC · JPL
314941	2006 WM_{100}	—	November 19, 2006	Catalina	CSS	·	2.1 km	MPC · JPL
314942	2006 WQ_{101}	—	November 19, 2006	Catalina	CSS	·	2.5 km	MPC · JPL
314943	2006 WC_{102}	—	November 19, 2006	Catalina	CSS	·	2.0 km	MPC · JPL
314944	2006 WA_{103}	—	November 19, 2006	Kitt Peak	Spacewatch	·	2.2 km	MPC · JPL
314945	2006 WO_{108}	—	November 19, 2006	Kitt Peak	Spacewatch	MRX	1.1 km	MPC · JPL
314946	2006 WQ_{109}	—	November 19, 2006	Kitt Peak	Spacewatch	·	1.9 km	MPC · JPL
314947	2006 WV_{111}	—	November 19, 2006	Catalina	CSS	·	2.7 km	MPC · JPL
314948	2006 WJ_{113}	—	November 19, 2006	Kitt Peak	Spacewatch	·	2.7 km	MPC · JPL
314949	2006 WA_{114}	—	November 20, 2006	Kitt Peak	Spacewatch	·	1.4 km	MPC · JPL
314950	2006 WD_{116}	—	November 20, 2006	Socorro	LINEAR	·	3.3 km	MPC · JPL
314951	2006 WK_{122}	—	November 21, 2006	Mount Lemmon	Mount Lemmon Survey	·	3.1 km	MPC · JPL
314952	2006 WF_{132}	—	November 18, 2006	Kitt Peak	Spacewatch	·	1.4 km	MPC · JPL
314953	2006 WS_{133}	—	November 18, 2006	Mount Lemmon	Mount Lemmon Survey	·	1.4 km	MPC · JPL
314954	2006 WJ_{134}	—	November 18, 2006	Mount Lemmon	Mount Lemmon Survey	·	1.3 km	MPC · JPL
314955	2006 WP_{143}	—	November 20, 2006	Kitt Peak	Spacewatch	·	1.8 km	MPC · JPL
314956	2006 WG_{148}	—	November 20, 2006	Socorro	LINEAR	EUP	5.6 km	MPC · JPL
314957	2006 WN_{162}	—	November 23, 2006	Kitt Peak	Spacewatch	·	1.5 km	MPC · JPL
314958	2006 WW_{165}	—	November 23, 2006	Kitt Peak	Spacewatch	·	1.8 km	MPC · JPL
314959	2006 WV_{170}	—	March 20, 1999	Socorro	LINEAR	·	2.2 km	MPC · JPL
314960	2006 WG_{174}	—	November 23, 2006	Kitt Peak	Spacewatch	AGN	1.1 km	MPC · JPL
314961	2006 WB_{189}	—	November 24, 2006	Mount Lemmon	Mount Lemmon Survey	·	2.3 km	MPC · JPL
314962	2006 WC_{190}	—	November 25, 2006	Catalina	CSS	DOR	2.6 km	MPC · JPL
314963	2006 WP_{191}	—	November 27, 2006	Kitt Peak	Spacewatch	·	3.1 km	MPC · JPL
314964	2006 WF_{192}	—	November 27, 2006	Kitt Peak	Spacewatch	·	1.8 km	MPC · JPL
314965	2006 WO_{192}	—	November 27, 2006	Kitt Peak	Spacewatch	·	1.5 km	MPC · JPL
314966	2006 WC_{198}	—	November 21, 2006	Mount Lemmon	Mount Lemmon Survey	·	2.4 km	MPC · JPL
314967	2006 WV_{202}	—	November 27, 2006	Mount Lemmon	Mount Lemmon Survey	NAE	3.3 km	MPC · JPL
314968	2006 XE	—	December 9, 2006	7300	W. K. Y. Yeung	·	2.1 km	MPC · JPL
314969	2006 XZ_{1}	—	December 11, 2006	Socorro	LINEAR	·	2.5 km	MPC · JPL
314970	2006 XR_{8}	—	December 9, 2006	Palomar	NEAT	·	4.3 km	MPC · JPL
314971	2006 XG_{10}	—	December 9, 2006	Kitt Peak	Spacewatch	·	2.9 km	MPC · JPL
314972	2006 XB_{11}	—	November 14, 2006	Mount Lemmon	Mount Lemmon Survey	TEL	1.8 km	MPC · JPL
314973	2006 XW_{12}	—	December 10, 2006	Kitt Peak	Spacewatch	NEM	2.2 km	MPC · JPL
314974	2006 XL_{13}	—	December 10, 2006	Kitt Peak	Spacewatch	·	1.4 km	MPC · JPL
314975	2006 XL_{15}	—	December 10, 2006	Kitt Peak	Spacewatch	PAD	3.1 km	MPC · JPL
314976	2006 XL_{17}	—	December 10, 2006	Kitt Peak	Spacewatch	·	2.5 km	MPC · JPL
314977	2006 XT_{19}	—	July 29, 2005	Palomar	NEAT	·	3.2 km	MPC · JPL
314978	2006 XO_{21}	—	December 12, 2006	Kitt Peak	Spacewatch	·	1.6 km	MPC · JPL
314979	2006 XU_{30}	—	December 13, 2006	Kitt Peak	Spacewatch	·	3.3 km	MPC · JPL
314980	2006 XV_{35}	—	December 11, 2006	Kitt Peak	Spacewatch	AGN	1.5 km	MPC · JPL
314981	2006 XX_{39}	—	December 12, 2006	Palomar	NEAT	·	1.5 km	MPC · JPL
314982	2006 XS_{41}	—	December 12, 2006	Mount Lemmon	Mount Lemmon Survey	·	2.5 km	MPC · JPL
314983	2006 XL_{42}	—	December 12, 2006	Catalina	CSS	·	2.5 km	MPC · JPL
314984	2006 XD_{43}	—	December 12, 2006	Mount Lemmon	Mount Lemmon Survey	·	1.5 km	MPC · JPL
314985	2006 XE_{46}	—	December 13, 2006	Mount Lemmon	Mount Lemmon Survey	AGN	1.4 km	MPC · JPL
314986	2006 XX_{46}	—	December 13, 2006	Catalina	CSS	·	2.1 km	MPC · JPL
314987	2006 XR_{62}	—	December 15, 2006	Kitt Peak	Spacewatch	·	2.8 km	MPC · JPL
314988 Sireland	2006 XO_{67}	Sireland	December 13, 2006	Mauna Kea	D. D. Balam	EOS	2.2 km	MPC · JPL
314989	2006 XR_{70}	—	December 12, 2006	Kitt Peak	Spacewatch	(16286)	2.3 km	MPC · JPL
314990	2006 YW_{4}	—	December 17, 2006	Mount Lemmon	Mount Lemmon Survey	AEO	1.3 km	MPC · JPL
314991	2006 YE_{8}	—	December 20, 2006	Mount Lemmon	Mount Lemmon Survey	·	2.6 km	MPC · JPL
314992	2006 YX_{11}	—	December 20, 2006	Farra d'Isonzo	Farra d'Isonzo	·	2.2 km	MPC · JPL
314993	2006 YW_{15}	—	December 20, 2006	Catalina	CSS	·	3.6 km	MPC · JPL
314994	2006 YD_{23}	—	December 21, 2006	Kitt Peak	Spacewatch	AGN	1.1 km	MPC · JPL
314995	2006 YW_{41}	—	December 22, 2006	Kitt Peak	Spacewatch	·	1.9 km	MPC · JPL
314996	2006 YG_{53}	—	December 21, 2006	Mount Lemmon	Mount Lemmon Survey	·	2.8 km	MPC · JPL
314997	2007 AB_{3}	—	January 8, 2007	Kitt Peak	Spacewatch	·	1.8 km	MPC · JPL
314998	2007 AP_{6}	—	January 8, 2007	Kitt Peak	Spacewatch	H	710 m	MPC · JPL
314999	2007 AO_{7}	—	December 13, 2006	Mount Lemmon	Mount Lemmon Survey	·	2.7 km	MPC · JPL
315000	2007 AY_{19}	—	January 10, 2007	Mount Lemmon	Mount Lemmon Survey	H	730 m	MPC · JPL

back to top

== See also ==
- Meanings of minor-planet names: 314001–315000
