= List of minor planets: 800001–801000 =

The following is a partial list of minor planets, running from minor-planet number 800001 through 801000, inclusive. The primary data for this and other partial lists is based on JPL's "Small-Body Orbital Elements" and data available from the Minor Planet Center. Critical list information is also provided by the MPC, unless otherwise specified from Lowell Observatory. A detailed description of the table's columns and additional sources are given on the main page including a complete list of every page in this series, and a statistical break-up on the dynamical classification of minor planets.

Also see the summary list of all named bodies in numerical and alphabetical order, and the corresponding naming citations for the number range of this particular list. New namings may only be added to this list after official publication, as the preannouncement of names is condemned by the Working Group for Small Bodies Nomenclature of the International Astronomical Union.

Near-Earth obj.	MBA (inner)	MBA (outer)	Centaur
Mars-crosser	MBA (middle)	Jupiter trojan	Trans-Neptunian obj.
Unclassified

== 800001–800100 ==
Designation			Discovery			Properties		Ref
Permanent	Provisional	Named after	Date	Site	Discoverer(s)	Category	Diam.	Ref
800001	2013 YW_{88}	—	December 28, 2013	Kitt Peak	Spacewatch	H	480 m	MPC · JPL
800002	2013 YZ_{88}	—	December 28, 2013	Kitt Peak	Spacewatch	V	480 m	MPC · JPL
800003	2013 YS_{89}	—	December 28, 2013	Kitt Peak	Spacewatch	·	1.5 km	MPC · JPL
800004	2013 YW_{104}	—	December 28, 2013	Kitt Peak	Spacewatch	·	860 m	MPC · JPL
800005	2013 YQ_{114}	—	January 7, 2006	Mount Lemmon	Mount Lemmon Survey	·	590 m	MPC · JPL
800006	2013 YE_{119}	—	December 30, 2013	Haleakala	Pan-STARRS 1	·	640 m	MPC · JPL
800007	2013 YF_{125}	—	December 30, 2013	Mount Lemmon	Mount Lemmon Survey	·	1.1 km	MPC · JPL
800008	2013 YV_{126}	—	January 16, 2009	Mount Lemmon	Mount Lemmon Survey	·	1.4 km	MPC · JPL
800009	2013 YL_{130}	—	December 31, 2013	Mount Lemmon	Mount Lemmon Survey	·	1.6 km	MPC · JPL
800010	2013 YM_{130}	—	December 31, 2013	Mount Lemmon	Mount Lemmon Survey	·	1.6 km	MPC · JPL
800011	2013 YZ_{130}	—	December 31, 2013	Mount Lemmon	Mount Lemmon Survey	EOS	1.4 km	MPC · JPL
800012	2013 YY_{132}	—	December 31, 2013	Mount Lemmon	Mount Lemmon Survey	·	1.6 km	MPC · JPL
800013	2013 YE_{134}	—	December 31, 2013	Mount Lemmon	Mount Lemmon Survey	·	1.4 km	MPC · JPL
800014	2013 YW_{137}	—	December 6, 2013	Haleakala	Pan-STARRS 1	EOS	1.4 km	MPC · JPL
800015	2013 YV_{138}	—	December 6, 2013	Haleakala	Pan-STARRS 1	·	1.0 km	MPC · JPL
800016	2013 YZ_{139}	—	August 26, 2012	Haleakala	Pan-STARRS 1	·	1.1 km	MPC · JPL
800017	2013 YC_{140}	—	December 23, 2013	Mount Lemmon	Mount Lemmon Survey	·	1.8 km	MPC · JPL
800018	2013 YV_{143}	—	December 14, 2013	Mount Lemmon	Mount Lemmon Survey	·	1.9 km	MPC · JPL
800019	2013 YS_{146}	—	December 31, 2013	Mount Lemmon	Mount Lemmon Survey	·	1.3 km	MPC · JPL
800020	2013 YE_{147}	—	July 28, 2011	Haleakala	Pan-STARRS 1	·	3.1 km	MPC · JPL
800021	2013 YC_{153}	—	December 31, 2013	Kitt Peak	Spacewatch	·	1.4 km	MPC · JPL
800022	2013 YF_{153}	—	October 26, 2009	Mount Lemmon	Mount Lemmon Survey	V	480 m	MPC · JPL
800023	2013 YL_{155}	—	December 24, 2013	Mount Lemmon	Mount Lemmon Survey	·	1.9 km	MPC · JPL
800024	2013 YH_{156}	—	December 31, 2013	Mount Lemmon	Mount Lemmon Survey	H	480 m	MPC · JPL
800025	2013 YT_{158}	—	November 14, 2017	Mount Lemmon	Mount Lemmon Survey	MAR	820 m	MPC · JPL
800026	2013 YM_{160}	—	September 12, 2007	Catalina	CSS	·	1.4 km	MPC · JPL
800027	2013 YQ_{160}	—	December 23, 2013	Mount Lemmon	Mount Lemmon Survey	·	1.0 km	MPC · JPL
800028	2013 YW_{161}	—	December 31, 2013	Haleakala	Pan-STARRS 1	PHO	560 m	MPC · JPL
800029	2013 YA_{163}	—	December 24, 2013	Mount Lemmon	Mount Lemmon Survey	PAD	1.1 km	MPC · JPL
800030	2013 YF_{163}	—	December 31, 2013	Kitt Peak	Spacewatch	AGN	870 m	MPC · JPL
800031	2013 YC_{164}	—	December 25, 2013	Mount Lemmon	Mount Lemmon Survey	·	760 m	MPC · JPL
800032	2013 YN_{164}	—	December 28, 2013	Kitt Peak	Spacewatch	·	660 m	MPC · JPL
800033	2013 YO_{165}	—	December 28, 2013	Kitt Peak	Spacewatch	·	1.0 km	MPC · JPL
800034	2013 YY_{165}	—	December 30, 2013	Haleakala	Pan-STARRS 1	3:2 · SHU	3.8 km	MPC · JPL
800035	2013 YS_{166}	—	December 23, 2013	Mount Lemmon	Mount Lemmon Survey	·	1.1 km	MPC · JPL
800036	2013 YH_{167}	—	December 25, 2013	Mount Lemmon	Mount Lemmon Survey	EOS	1.2 km	MPC · JPL
800037	2013 YV_{167}	—	December 27, 2013	Kitt Peak	Spacewatch	T_{j} (2.96)	1.7 km	MPC · JPL
800038	2013 YP_{169}	—	December 29, 2013	Haleakala	Pan-STARRS 1	·	1.2 km	MPC · JPL
800039	2013 YC_{170}	—	December 31, 2013	Haleakala	Pan-STARRS 1	·	970 m	MPC · JPL
800040	2013 YS_{172}	—	December 31, 2013	Mount Lemmon	Mount Lemmon Survey	·	2.1 km	MPC · JPL
800041	2014 AV_{7}	—	January 1, 2009	Mount Lemmon	Mount Lemmon Survey	·	1.3 km	MPC · JPL
800042	2014 AB_{10}	—	October 17, 2012	Mount Lemmon	Mount Lemmon Survey	EOS	1.4 km	MPC · JPL
800043	2014 AQ_{20}	—	September 17, 2009	Kitt Peak	Spacewatch	·	640 m	MPC · JPL
800044	2014 AT_{22}	—	March 11, 2011	Mount Lemmon	Mount Lemmon Survey	·	670 m	MPC · JPL
800045	2014 AB_{25}	—	January 3, 2014	Mount Lemmon	Mount Lemmon Survey	·	2.2 km	MPC · JPL
800046	2014 AZ_{27}	—	October 5, 2002	Palomar Mountain	NEAT	slow	1.9 km	MPC · JPL
800047	2014 AF_{31}	—	January 4, 2014	Mount Lemmon	Mount Lemmon Survey	·	1.2 km	MPC · JPL
800048	2014 AE_{34}	—	January 2, 2014	Mount Lemmon	Mount Lemmon Survey	·	670 m	MPC · JPL
800049	2014 AQ_{37}	—	December 25, 2013	Mount Lemmon	Mount Lemmon Survey	·	660 m	MPC · JPL
800050	2014 AW_{46}	—	January 5, 2014	Haleakala	Pan-STARRS 1	·	680 m	MPC · JPL
800051	2014 AV_{48}	—	January 20, 2009	Mount Lemmon	Mount Lemmon Survey	·	1.7 km	MPC · JPL
800052	2014 AL_{51}	—	November 29, 2013	Mount Lemmon	Mount Lemmon Survey	H	500 m	MPC · JPL
800053	2014 AE_{53}	—	January 4, 2014	Mount Lemmon	Mount Lemmon Survey	·	1.6 km	MPC · JPL
800054	2014 AD_{54}	—	January 9, 2014	Haleakala	Pan-STARRS 1	H	470 m	MPC · JPL
800055	2014 AE_{54}	—	January 9, 2014	Haleakala	Pan-STARRS 1	H	480 m	MPC · JPL
800056	2014 AB_{55}	—	January 2, 2014	Catalina	CSS	AMO	720 m	MPC · JPL
800057	2014 AS_{58}	—	January 1, 2014	Haleakala	Pan-STARRS 1	·	940 m	MPC · JPL
800058	2014 AB_{63}	—	January 9, 2014	Haleakala	Pan-STARRS 1	H	440 m	MPC · JPL
800059	2014 AJ_{65}	—	January 1, 2014	Haleakala	Pan-STARRS 1	·	1.4 km	MPC · JPL
800060	2014 AL_{65}	—	January 2, 2014	Kitt Peak	Spacewatch	·	1.3 km	MPC · JPL
800061	2014 AF_{68}	—	January 1, 2014	Haleakala	Pan-STARRS 1	·	1.7 km	MPC · JPL
800062	2014 AG_{68}	—	January 1, 2014	Haleakala	Pan-STARRS 1	·	1.2 km	MPC · JPL
800063	2014 AW_{68}	—	January 1, 2014	Kitt Peak	Spacewatch	·	2.1 km	MPC · JPL
800064	2014 AH_{70}	—	January 4, 2014	Mount Lemmon	Mount Lemmon Survey	·	2.3 km	MPC · JPL
800065	2014 AV_{74}	—	January 7, 2014	Mount Lemmon	Mount Lemmon Survey	·	2.3 km	MPC · JPL
800066	2014 AZ_{75}	—	January 9, 2014	Kitt Peak	Spacewatch	MRX	770 m	MPC · JPL
800067	2014 AG_{76}	—	January 9, 2014	Haleakala	Pan-STARRS 1	·	940 m	MPC · JPL
800068	2014 AQ_{78}	—	January 1, 2014	Haleakala	Pan-STARRS 1	·	1.8 km	MPC · JPL
800069	2014 AX_{78}	—	January 5, 2014	Kitt Peak	Spacewatch	·	1.7 km	MPC · JPL
800070	2014 AJ_{80}	—	January 7, 2014	Haleakala	Pan-STARRS 1	·	1.4 km	MPC · JPL
800071	2014 AO_{80}	—	January 1, 2014	Haleakala	Pan-STARRS 1	·	1.6 km	MPC · JPL
800072	2014 AV_{80}	—	January 10, 2014	Kitt Peak	Spacewatch	·	1.3 km	MPC · JPL
800073	2014 BF_{2}	—	January 3, 2014	Kitt Peak	Spacewatch	(5)	770 m	MPC · JPL
800074	2014 BU_{8}	—	January 21, 2014	Haleakala	Pan-STARRS 1	H	490 m	MPC · JPL
800075	2014 BH_{9}	—	January 21, 2014	Haleakala	Pan-STARRS 1	H	430 m	MPC · JPL
800076	2014 BX_{18}	—	November 3, 2007	Kitt Peak	Spacewatch	·	1.5 km	MPC · JPL
800077	2014 BK_{22}	—	January 23, 2014	Mount Lemmon	Mount Lemmon Survey	(5)	840 m	MPC · JPL
800078	2014 BR_{25}	—	December 28, 2013	Kitt Peak	Spacewatch	PHO	590 m	MPC · JPL
800079	2014 BB_{28}	—	January 21, 2014	Mount Lemmon	Mount Lemmon Survey	·	1.4 km	MPC · JPL
800080	2014 BP_{31}	—	December 11, 2013	Mount Lemmon	Mount Lemmon Survey	T_{j} (2.97)	940 m	MPC · JPL
800081	2014 BR_{31}	—	December 28, 2013	Kitt Peak	Spacewatch	·	2.1 km	MPC · JPL
800082	2014 BB_{41}	—	September 21, 2009	Mount Lemmon	Mount Lemmon Survey	·	710 m	MPC · JPL
800083	2014 BA_{43}	—	January 25, 2014	Haleakala	Pan-STARRS 1	H	430 m	MPC · JPL
800084	2014 BO_{50}	—	December 24, 2013	Mount Lemmon	Mount Lemmon Survey	H	400 m	MPC · JPL
800085	2014 BL_{51}	—	December 13, 2013	Mount Lemmon	Mount Lemmon Survey	·	1.5 km	MPC · JPL
800086	2014 BZ_{51}	—	January 24, 2014	Haleakala	Pan-STARRS 1	·	2.1 km	MPC · JPL
800087	2014 BA_{53}	—	December 31, 2013	Kitt Peak	Spacewatch	·	1.8 km	MPC · JPL
800088	2014 BH_{54}	—	February 3, 2009	Kitt Peak	Spacewatch	·	1.1 km	MPC · JPL
800089	2014 BC_{57}	—	January 9, 2014	Mount Lemmon	Mount Lemmon Survey	·	2.2 km	MPC · JPL
800090	2014 BQ_{69}	—	January 31, 2014	Haleakala	Pan-STARRS 1	·	1.9 km	MPC · JPL
800091	2014 BT_{72}	—	January 28, 2014	Kitt Peak	Spacewatch	V	500 m	MPC · JPL
800092	2014 BJ_{73}	—	January 23, 2014	Mount Lemmon	Mount Lemmon Survey	EOS	1.4 km	MPC · JPL
800093	2014 BP_{75}	—	January 29, 2014	Kitt Peak	Spacewatch	·	1.9 km	MPC · JPL
800094	2014 BY_{75}	—	January 26, 2014	Haleakala	Pan-STARRS 1	EOS	1.3 km	MPC · JPL
800095	2014 BG_{77}	—	January 21, 2014	Mount Lemmon	Mount Lemmon Survey	·	1.6 km	MPC · JPL
800096	2014 BF_{79}	—	January 29, 2014	Kitt Peak	Spacewatch	·	1.2 km	MPC · JPL
800097	2014 BN_{79}	—	January 25, 2014	Haleakala	Pan-STARRS 1	EOS	1.1 km	MPC · JPL
800098	2014 BV_{79}	—	January 25, 2014	Haleakala	Pan-STARRS 1	·	1.2 km	MPC · JPL
800099	2014 BR_{80}	—	January 26, 2014	Haleakala	Pan-STARRS 1	·	1.0 km	MPC · JPL
800100	2014 BP_{81}	—	January 28, 2014	Mount Lemmon	Mount Lemmon Survey	·	1.6 km	MPC · JPL

== 800101–800200 ==
back to top

Designation			Discovery			Properties		Ref
Permanent	Provisional	Named after	Date	Site	Discoverer(s)	Category	Diam.	Ref
800101	2014 BR_{84}	—	January 25, 2014	Haleakala	Pan-STARRS 1	·	1.8 km	MPC · JPL
800102	2014 BT_{84}	—	January 25, 2014	Haleakala	Pan-STARRS 1	·	1.4 km	MPC · JPL
800103	2014 BV_{85}	—	January 24, 2014	Haleakala	Pan-STARRS 1	·	1.0 km	MPC · JPL
800104	2014 BZ_{85}	—	January 28, 2014	Mount Lemmon	Mount Lemmon Survey	EOS	1.2 km	MPC · JPL
800105	2014 BC_{90}	—	January 24, 2014	Haleakala	Pan-STARRS 1	·	1.9 km	MPC · JPL
800106	2014 BY_{90}	—	January 23, 2014	Kitt Peak	Spacewatch	·	1.1 km	MPC · JPL
800107	2014 BB_{91}	—	January 31, 2014	Haleakala	Pan-STARRS 1	·	1.4 km	MPC · JPL
800108	2014 BC_{92}	—	January 25, 2014	Haleakala	Pan-STARRS 1	·	1.6 km	MPC · JPL
800109	2014 BD_{92}	—	January 21, 2014	Mount Lemmon	Mount Lemmon Survey	·	1.6 km	MPC · JPL
800110	2014 BQ_{92}	—	January 24, 2014	Haleakala	Pan-STARRS 1	·	1.4 km	MPC · JPL
800111	2014 BS_{94}	—	January 24, 2014	Haleakala	Pan-STARRS 1	·	1.5 km	MPC · JPL
800112	2014 CY_{1}	—	January 26, 2014	Haleakala	Pan-STARRS 1	H	520 m	MPC · JPL
800113 Zaharydonchev	2014 CB_{2}	Zaharydonchev	February 4, 2014	Smolyan	Bulgarian National Observatory	·	1.8 km	MPC · JPL
800114	2014 CY_{5}	—	January 24, 2014	Haleakala	Pan-STARRS 1	·	1.9 km	MPC · JPL
800115	2014 CU_{6}	—	January 10, 2014	Kitt Peak	Spacewatch	·	820 m	MPC · JPL
800116	2014 CC_{10}	—	January 28, 2014	Mount Lemmon	Mount Lemmon Survey	·	1.0 km	MPC · JPL
800117	2014 CZ_{11}	—	March 26, 2001	Kitt Peak	Deep Ecliptic Survey	·	1.1 km	MPC · JPL
800118	2014 CC_{14}	—	February 10, 2014	Haleakala	Pan-STARRS 1	H	480 m	MPC · JPL
800119	2014 CW_{18}	—	February 9, 2014	Haleakala	Pan-STARRS 1	H	430 m	MPC · JPL
800120	2014 CA_{24}	—	February 9, 2014	Kitt Peak	Spacewatch	NYS	830 m	MPC · JPL
800121	2014 CT_{26}	—	March 28, 2009	Kitt Peak	Spacewatch	·	1.4 km	MPC · JPL
800122	2014 CP_{28}	—	February 11, 2014	Mount Lemmon	Mount Lemmon Survey	·	2.3 km	MPC · JPL
800123	2014 CY_{29}	—	February 6, 2014	Mount Lemmon	Mount Lemmon Survey	NYS	750 m	MPC · JPL
800124	2014 CW_{31}	—	February 10, 2014	Haleakala	Pan-STARRS 1	·	2.1 km	MPC · JPL
800125	2014 CZ_{31}	—	February 11, 2014	Mount Lemmon	Mount Lemmon Survey	·	2.2 km	MPC · JPL
800126	2014 CH_{32}	—	February 9, 2014	Mount Lemmon	Mount Lemmon Survey	·	1.3 km	MPC · JPL
800127	2014 CQ_{32}	—	March 27, 2003	Palomar Mountain	NEAT	·	900 m	MPC · JPL
800128	2014 CU_{32}	—	February 10, 2014	Haleakala	Pan-STARRS 1	·	1.2 km	MPC · JPL
800129	2014 CY_{33}	—	February 10, 2014	Haleakala	Pan-STARRS 1	·	840 m	MPC · JPL
800130	2014 CX_{35}	—	February 10, 2014	Haleakala	Pan-STARRS 1	·	1.5 km	MPC · JPL
800131	2014 CA_{36}	—	February 10, 2014	Haleakala	Pan-STARRS 1	·	840 m	MPC · JPL
800132	2014 CS_{37}	—	February 9, 2014	Kitt Peak	Spacewatch	·	1.7 km	MPC · JPL
800133	2014 DD	—	January 29, 2014	Catalina	CSS	·	500 m	MPC · JPL
800134	2014 DJ_{2}	—	January 23, 2014	Catalina	CSS	T_{j} (2.96)	1.7 km	MPC · JPL
800135	2014 DG_{4}	—	February 19, 2014	Mount Lemmon	Mount Lemmon Survey	EMA	2.1 km	MPC · JPL
800136	2014 DA_{6}	—	April 1, 2003	Catalina	CSS	T_{j} (2.98)	2.2 km	MPC · JPL
800137	2014 DK_{6}	—	November 18, 2007	Mount Lemmon	Mount Lemmon Survey	·	1.8 km	MPC · JPL
800138	2014 DP_{8}	—	January 9, 2014	Haleakala	Pan-STARRS 1	H	450 m	MPC · JPL
800139	2014 DO_{9}	—	February 23, 2007	Kitt Peak	Spacewatch	·	790 m	MPC · JPL
800140	2014 DB_{10}	—	June 19, 2009	Kitt Peak	Spacewatch	H	440 m	MPC · JPL
800141	2014 DZ_{10}	—	January 28, 2014	Mount Lemmon	Mount Lemmon Survey	H	420 m	MPC · JPL
800142	2014 DW_{19}	—	February 22, 2014	Kitt Peak	Spacewatch	·	2.5 km	MPC · JPL
800143	2014 DB_{22}	—	February 24, 2014	Haleakala	Pan-STARRS 1	H	450 m	MPC · JPL
800144	2014 DK_{25}	—	February 20, 2014	Mount Lemmon	Mount Lemmon Survey	·	2.5 km	MPC · JPL
800145	2014 DQ_{25}	—	February 20, 2014	Mount Lemmon	Mount Lemmon Survey	·	1.9 km	MPC · JPL
800146	2014 DF_{26}	—	April 20, 2009	Kitt Peak	Spacewatch	·	1.7 km	MPC · JPL
800147	2014 DN_{27}	—	December 28, 2002	Kitt Peak	Spacewatch	·	1.0 km	MPC · JPL
800148	2014 DD_{30}	—	February 9, 2014	Kitt Peak	Spacewatch	·	1.9 km	MPC · JPL
800149	2014 DR_{32}	—	February 21, 2014	Kitt Peak	Spacewatch	·	1.4 km	MPC · JPL
800150	2014 DP_{33}	—	January 29, 2014	Mount Lemmon	Mount Lemmon Survey	TIR	2.2 km	MPC · JPL
800151	2014 DF_{34}	—	February 22, 2014	Kitt Peak	Spacewatch	·	1.8 km	MPC · JPL
800152	2014 DN_{34}	—	January 23, 2014	Mount Lemmon	Mount Lemmon Survey	·	2.0 km	MPC · JPL
800153	2014 DJ_{36}	—	January 8, 1999	Kitt Peak	Spacewatch	·	690 m	MPC · JPL
800154	2014 DF_{44}	—	February 26, 2014	Mount Lemmon	Mount Lemmon Survey	·	2.1 km	MPC · JPL
800155	2014 DC_{52}	—	February 26, 2014	Haleakala	Pan-STARRS 1	KOR	970 m	MPC · JPL
800156	2014 DV_{58}	—	February 26, 2014	Haleakala	Pan-STARRS 1	L4 · ERY	5.7 km	MPC · JPL
800157	2014 DW_{59}	—	February 26, 2014	Haleakala	Pan-STARRS 1	TIR	2.0 km	MPC · JPL
800158	2014 DX_{60}	—	February 26, 2014	Haleakala	Pan-STARRS 1	·	2.2 km	MPC · JPL
800159	2014 DT_{65}	—	February 26, 2014	Haleakala	Pan-STARRS 1	·	1.7 km	MPC · JPL
800160	2014 DS_{68}	—	February 26, 2014	Haleakala	Pan-STARRS 1	·	2.3 km	MPC · JPL
800161	2014 DH_{70}	—	February 26, 2014	Haleakala	Pan-STARRS 1	·	970 m	MPC · JPL
800162	2014 DG_{72}	—	February 26, 2014	Haleakala	Pan-STARRS 1	·	1.9 km	MPC · JPL
800163	2014 DJ_{75}	—	December 4, 2012	Mount Lemmon	Mount Lemmon Survey	·	1.9 km	MPC · JPL
800164	2014 DZ_{75}	—	February 26, 2014	Haleakala	Pan-STARRS 1	·	830 m	MPC · JPL
800165	2014 DA_{76}	—	February 26, 2014	Haleakala	Pan-STARRS 1	·	1.9 km	MPC · JPL
800166	2014 DD_{76}	—	February 26, 2014	Kitt Peak	Spacewatch	TIR	1.8 km	MPC · JPL
800167	2014 DY_{83}	—	February 25, 2014	Kitt Peak	Spacewatch	·	1.6 km	MPC · JPL
800168	2014 DH_{84}	—	February 25, 2014	Kitt Peak	Spacewatch	·	1.9 km	MPC · JPL
800169	2014 DO_{87}	—	February 26, 2014	Mount Lemmon	Mount Lemmon Survey	·	1.6 km	MPC · JPL
800170	2014 DU_{87}	—	February 26, 2014	Mount Lemmon	Mount Lemmon Survey	·	1.3 km	MPC · JPL
800171	2014 DA_{88}	—	January 28, 2014	Kitt Peak	Spacewatch	·	1.8 km	MPC · JPL
800172	2014 DO_{90}	—	February 26, 2014	Haleakala	Pan-STARRS 1	·	1.6 km	MPC · JPL
800173	2014 DX_{90}	—	October 22, 2012	Haleakala	Pan-STARRS 1	·	1.4 km	MPC · JPL
800174	2014 DZ_{90}	—	February 26, 2014	Mount Lemmon	Mount Lemmon Survey	·	2.2 km	MPC · JPL
800175	2014 DK_{92}	—	February 26, 2014	Haleakala	Pan-STARRS 1	L4	5.8 km	MPC · JPL
800176	2014 DY_{97}	—	February 27, 2014	Mount Lemmon	Mount Lemmon Survey	·	1.6 km	MPC · JPL
800177	2014 DH_{98}	—	February 10, 2014	Haleakala	Pan-STARRS 1	·	1.7 km	MPC · JPL
800178	2014 DY_{98}	—	January 9, 2014	Mount Lemmon	Mount Lemmon Survey	·	1.5 km	MPC · JPL
800179	2014 DA_{103}	—	September 5, 2007	Anderson Mesa	LONEOS	·	2.0 km	MPC · JPL
800180	2014 DP_{107}	—	November 6, 2005	Kitt Peak	Spacewatch	NYS	890 m	MPC · JPL
800181	2014 DC_{110}	—	April 10, 2010	Mount Lemmon	Mount Lemmon Survey	·	1.1 km	MPC · JPL
800182	2014 DJ_{111}	—	January 28, 2014	Kitt Peak	Spacewatch	·	1.4 km	MPC · JPL
800183	2014 DQ_{113}	—	January 29, 2014	Kitt Peak	Spacewatch	·	960 m	MPC · JPL
800184	2014 DO_{114}	—	February 26, 2014	Mount Lemmon	Mount Lemmon Survey	·	1.6 km	MPC · JPL
800185	2014 DH_{116}	—	February 9, 2014	Mount Lemmon	Mount Lemmon Survey	T_{j} (2.97)	1.9 km	MPC · JPL
800186	2014 DR_{126}	—	February 28, 2014	Haleakala	Pan-STARRS 1	·	1.5 km	MPC · JPL
800187	2014 DQ_{130}	—	February 28, 2014	Haleakala	Pan-STARRS 1	·	2.0 km	MPC · JPL
800188	2014 DY_{132}	—	February 28, 2014	Haleakala	Pan-STARRS 1	THM	1.4 km	MPC · JPL
800189	2014 DF_{133}	—	February 22, 2014	Kitt Peak	Spacewatch	·	750 m	MPC · JPL
800190	2014 DT_{133}	—	February 28, 2014	Haleakala	Pan-STARRS 1	·	1.7 km	MPC · JPL
800191	2014 DX_{133}	—	February 28, 2014	Haleakala	Pan-STARRS 1	·	1.4 km	MPC · JPL
800192	2014 DF_{134}	—	February 28, 2014	Haleakala	Pan-STARRS 1	·	1.9 km	MPC · JPL
800193	2014 DU_{135}	—	February 28, 2014	Haleakala	Pan-STARRS 1	·	1.9 km	MPC · JPL
800194	2014 DD_{138}	—	February 28, 2014	Haleakala	Pan-STARRS 1	·	1.9 km	MPC · JPL
800195	2014 DZ_{138}	—	February 28, 2014	Haleakala	Pan-STARRS 1	·	870 m	MPC · JPL
800196	2014 DW_{144}	—	February 27, 2014	Kitt Peak	Spacewatch	·	2.0 km	MPC · JPL
800197	2014 DL_{145}	—	February 28, 2014	Haleakala	Pan-STARRS 1	·	2.1 km	MPC · JPL
800198	2014 DQ_{145}	—	February 28, 2014	Haleakala	Pan-STARRS 1	THB	2.3 km	MPC · JPL
800199	2014 DP_{148}	—	February 26, 2014	Haleakala	Pan-STARRS 1	AGN	900 m	MPC · JPL
800200	2014 DJ_{152}	—	February 26, 2014	Haleakala	Pan-STARRS 1	·	2.4 km	MPC · JPL

== 800201–800300 ==
back to top

Designation			Discovery			Properties		Ref
Permanent	Provisional	Named after	Date	Site	Discoverer(s)	Category	Diam.	Ref
800201	2014 DS_{153}	—	February 28, 2014	Haleakala	Pan-STARRS 1	THM	1.6 km	MPC · JPL
800202	2014 DY_{153}	—	February 28, 2014	Haleakala	Pan-STARRS 1	·	2.2 km	MPC · JPL
800203	2014 DP_{154}	—	February 28, 2014	Haleakala	Pan-STARRS 1	·	1.4 km	MPC · JPL
800204	2014 DT_{157}	—	February 20, 2014	Haleakala	Pan-STARRS 1	·	1.3 km	MPC · JPL
800205	2014 DW_{158}	—	February 26, 2014	Haleakala	Pan-STARRS 1	·	2.3 km	MPC · JPL
800206	2014 DK_{161}	—	February 26, 2014	Mount Lemmon	Mount Lemmon Survey	·	2.0 km	MPC · JPL
800207	2014 DA_{162}	—	February 22, 2014	Mount Lemmon	Mount Lemmon Survey	T_{j} (2.99) · EUP	2.4 km	MPC · JPL
800208	2014 DO_{162}	—	February 25, 2014	Haleakala	Pan-STARRS 1	·	1.7 km	MPC · JPL
800209	2014 DT_{162}	—	August 1, 2016	Haleakala	Pan-STARRS 1	·	2.0 km	MPC · JPL
800210	2014 DY_{162}	—	February 26, 2014	Haleakala	Pan-STARRS 1	·	2.0 km	MPC · JPL
800211	2014 DA_{165}	—	February 28, 2014	Haleakala	Pan-STARRS 1	·	1.6 km	MPC · JPL
800212	2014 DE_{165}	—	February 28, 2014	Haleakala	Pan-STARRS 1	·	1.8 km	MPC · JPL
800213	2014 DG_{166}	—	February 26, 2014	Mount Lemmon	Mount Lemmon Survey	·	2.2 km	MPC · JPL
800214	2014 DX_{167}	—	February 26, 2014	Haleakala	Pan-STARRS 1	VER	1.8 km	MPC · JPL
800215	2014 DY_{167}	—	February 27, 2014	Haleakala	Pan-STARRS 1	·	1.8 km	MPC · JPL
800216	2014 DF_{168}	—	February 27, 2014	Kitt Peak	Spacewatch	·	1.6 km	MPC · JPL
800217	2014 DK_{169}	—	February 27, 2014	Haleakala	Pan-STARRS 1	·	890 m	MPC · JPL
800218	2014 DS_{169}	—	February 28, 2014	Haleakala	Pan-STARRS 1	·	1.1 km	MPC · JPL
800219	2014 DX_{169}	—	February 28, 2014	Haleakala	Pan-STARRS 1	·	1.7 km	MPC · JPL
800220	2014 DF_{170}	—	February 27, 2014	Kitt Peak	Spacewatch	·	900 m	MPC · JPL
800221	2014 DS_{170}	—	February 26, 2014	Mount Lemmon	Mount Lemmon Survey	·	1.7 km	MPC · JPL
800222	2014 DE_{171}	—	February 28, 2014	Haleakala	Pan-STARRS 1	·	1.4 km	MPC · JPL
800223	2014 DK_{171}	—	February 28, 2014	Haleakala	Pan-STARRS 1	URS	2.2 km	MPC · JPL
800224	2014 DM_{171}	—	February 27, 2014	Mount Lemmon	Mount Lemmon Survey	HYG	1.7 km	MPC · JPL
800225	2014 DS_{171}	—	February 28, 2014	Haleakala	Pan-STARRS 1	THM	1.9 km	MPC · JPL
800226	2014 DX_{171}	—	February 24, 2014	Haleakala	Pan-STARRS 1	·	1.9 km	MPC · JPL
800227	2014 DY_{171}	—	February 24, 2014	Haleakala	Pan-STARRS 1	·	1.7 km	MPC · JPL
800228	2014 DA_{172}	—	February 18, 2014	Mount Lemmon	Mount Lemmon Survey	·	1.3 km	MPC · JPL
800229	2014 DG_{172}	—	February 26, 2014	Mount Lemmon	Mount Lemmon Survey	·	2.0 km	MPC · JPL
800230	2014 DT_{172}	—	February 26, 2014	Haleakala	Pan-STARRS 1	·	1.9 km	MPC · JPL
800231	2014 DW_{172}	—	February 24, 2014	Haleakala	Pan-STARRS 1	·	2.2 km	MPC · JPL
800232	2014 DY_{172}	—	February 26, 2014	Haleakala	Pan-STARRS 1	·	2.2 km	MPC · JPL
800233	2014 DB_{173}	—	February 26, 2014	Haleakala	Pan-STARRS 1	·	1.4 km	MPC · JPL
800234	2014 DE_{173}	—	February 27, 2014	Kitt Peak	Spacewatch	·	1.2 km	MPC · JPL
800235	2014 DJ_{173}	—	February 24, 2014	Haleakala	Pan-STARRS 1	T_{j} (2.98)	2.3 km	MPC · JPL
800236	2014 DM_{173}	—	February 26, 2014	Haleakala	Pan-STARRS 1	EOS	1.1 km	MPC · JPL
800237	2014 DS_{173}	—	February 27, 2014	Kitt Peak	Spacewatch	·	2.1 km	MPC · JPL
800238	2014 DN_{174}	—	February 28, 2014	Haleakala	Pan-STARRS 1	·	710 m	MPC · JPL
800239	2014 DH_{176}	—	February 27, 2014	Haleakala	Pan-STARRS 1	EOS	1.3 km	MPC · JPL
800240	2014 DP_{176}	—	February 26, 2014	Mount Lemmon	Mount Lemmon Survey	EMA	2.1 km	MPC · JPL
800241	2014 DK_{177}	—	February 26, 2014	Haleakala	Pan-STARRS 1	·	1.3 km	MPC · JPL
800242	2014 DO_{177}	—	February 26, 2014	Haleakala	Pan-STARRS 1	HOF	2.0 km	MPC · JPL
800243	2014 DR_{177}	—	February 28, 2014	Haleakala	Pan-STARRS 1	·	1.6 km	MPC · JPL
800244	2014 DT_{177}	—	February 26, 2014	Haleakala	Pan-STARRS 1	(1298)	1.9 km	MPC · JPL
800245	2014 DK_{178}	—	February 26, 2014	Haleakala	Pan-STARRS 1	·	1.9 km	MPC · JPL
800246	2014 DM_{179}	—	February 24, 2014	Haleakala	Pan-STARRS 1	·	1.7 km	MPC · JPL
800247	2014 DV_{179}	—	February 26, 2014	Haleakala	Pan-STARRS 1	·	680 m	MPC · JPL
800248	2014 DN_{180}	—	February 24, 2014	Haleakala	Pan-STARRS 1	EOS	1.3 km	MPC · JPL
800249	2014 DP_{180}	—	February 26, 2014	Haleakala	Pan-STARRS 1	·	1.4 km	MPC · JPL
800250	2014 DU_{183}	—	February 27, 2014	Haleakala	Pan-STARRS 1	·	2.1 km	MPC · JPL
800251	2014 DF_{184}	—	February 28, 2014	Haleakala	Pan-STARRS 1	·	2.2 km	MPC · JPL
800252	2014 DJ_{184}	—	February 26, 2014	Mount Lemmon	Mount Lemmon Survey	L4	6.5 km	MPC · JPL
800253	2014 DF_{185}	—	February 20, 2014	Mount Lemmon	Mount Lemmon Survey	·	1.7 km	MPC · JPL
800254	2014 DN_{186}	—	February 26, 2014	Haleakala	Pan-STARRS 1	(5)	840 m	MPC · JPL
800255	2014 DR_{186}	—	February 28, 2014	Haleakala	Pan-STARRS 1	·	820 m	MPC · JPL
800256	2014 DX_{186}	—	February 22, 2014	Kitt Peak	Spacewatch	·	1.2 km	MPC · JPL
800257	2014 DH_{187}	—	February 28, 2014	Haleakala	Pan-STARRS 1	HYG	1.9 km	MPC · JPL
800258	2014 DH_{188}	—	February 28, 2014	Haleakala	Pan-STARRS 1	TIR	1.8 km	MPC · JPL
800259	2014 DT_{188}	—	February 28, 2014	Haleakala	Pan-STARRS 1	·	1.9 km	MPC · JPL
800260	2014 DV_{189}	—	February 26, 2014	Haleakala	Pan-STARRS 1	·	1.2 km	MPC · JPL
800261	2014 DS_{191}	—	February 28, 2014	Haleakala	Pan-STARRS 1	·	2.2 km	MPC · JPL
800262	2014 DV_{191}	—	February 28, 2014	Haleakala	Pan-STARRS 1	L4	5.4 km	MPC · JPL
800263	2014 DP_{193}	—	February 27, 2014	Mount Lemmon	Mount Lemmon Survey	·	1.1 km	MPC · JPL
800264	2014 DW_{193}	—	February 26, 2014	Haleakala	Pan-STARRS 1	·	610 m	MPC · JPL
800265	2014 DN_{195}	—	February 26, 2014	Haleakala	Pan-STARRS 1	·	2.0 km	MPC · JPL
800266	2014 DJ_{196}	—	February 22, 2014	Kitt Peak	Spacewatch	·	2.1 km	MPC · JPL
800267	2014 DJ_{197}	—	February 26, 2014	Haleakala	Pan-STARRS 1	EOS	1.2 km	MPC · JPL
800268	2014 DP_{197}	—	February 28, 2014	Haleakala	Pan-STARRS 1	·	2.2 km	MPC · JPL
800269	2014 DT_{197}	—	February 26, 2014	Haleakala	Pan-STARRS 1	EOS	1.2 km	MPC · JPL
800270	2014 DS_{198}	—	February 28, 2014	Haleakala	Pan-STARRS 1	·	1.1 km	MPC · JPL
800271	2014 DT_{200}	—	February 28, 2014	Mount Lemmon	Mount Lemmon Survey	·	2.4 km	MPC · JPL
800272	2014 DU_{200}	—	February 28, 2014	Haleakala	Pan-STARRS 1	·	1.9 km	MPC · JPL
800273	2014 DX_{200}	—	February 24, 2014	Haleakala	Pan-STARRS 1	LIX	2.2 km	MPC · JPL
800274	2014 DE_{201}	—	February 26, 2014	Haleakala	Pan-STARRS 1	·	1.5 km	MPC · JPL
800275	2014 DH_{201}	—	February 28, 2014	Haleakala	Pan-STARRS 1	L4	6.3 km	MPC · JPL
800276	2014 DJ_{201}	—	February 28, 2014	Haleakala	Pan-STARRS 1	EOS	1.1 km	MPC · JPL
800277	2014 DN_{201}	—	February 28, 2014	Haleakala	Pan-STARRS 1	·	1.9 km	MPC · JPL
800278	2014 DW_{201}	—	February 27, 2014	Mount Lemmon	Mount Lemmon Survey	EOS	1.3 km	MPC · JPL
800279	2014 DK_{202}	—	July 7, 2005	Mauna Kea	Veillet, C.	·	1.2 km	MPC · JPL
800280	2014 DG_{207}	—	September 28, 2021	Haleakala	Pan-STARRS 2	·	2.1 km	MPC · JPL
800281	2014 DQ_{211}	—	February 26, 2014	Haleakala	Pan-STARRS 1	·	2.3 km	MPC · JPL
800282	2014 DX_{211}	—	February 27, 2014	Mount Lemmon	Mount Lemmon Survey	·	1.6 km	MPC · JPL
800283	2014 DC_{212}	—	February 20, 2014	Mount Lemmon	Mount Lemmon Survey	·	1.7 km	MPC · JPL
800284	2014 DL_{212}	—	February 26, 2014	Haleakala	Pan-STARRS 1	L4	6.1 km	MPC · JPL
800285	2014 EW_{2}	—	February 25, 2014	Kitt Peak	Spacewatch	EOS	1.3 km	MPC · JPL
800286	2014 ES_{8}	—	March 6, 2014	Mount Lemmon	Mount Lemmon Survey	·	1.9 km	MPC · JPL
800287	2014 EF_{10}	—	February 22, 2014	Kitt Peak	Spacewatch	T_{j} (2.9)	2.2 km	MPC · JPL
800288	2014 EX_{10}	—	October 1, 2005	Mount Lemmon	Mount Lemmon Survey	·	600 m	MPC · JPL
800289	2014 EA_{11}	—	February 26, 2014	Haleakala	Pan-STARRS 1	TIR	1.8 km	MPC · JPL
800290	2014 EO_{11}	—	March 7, 2014	Mount Lemmon	Mount Lemmon Survey	(69559)	2.2 km	MPC · JPL
800291	2014 ET_{11}	—	March 7, 2014	Mount Lemmon	Mount Lemmon Survey	·	1.9 km	MPC · JPL
800292	2014 EW_{14}	—	March 5, 2014	Haleakala	Pan-STARRS 1	·	2.3 km	MPC · JPL
800293	2014 EP_{17}	—	November 23, 2009	Mount Lemmon	Mount Lemmon Survey	·	820 m	MPC · JPL
800294	2014 EB_{19}	—	March 10, 2007	Mount Lemmon	Mount Lemmon Survey	·	860 m	MPC · JPL
800295	2014 EC_{23}	—	March 8, 2014	Kitt Peak	Spacewatch	·	1.7 km	MPC · JPL
800296	2014 EG_{25}	—	September 19, 1998	Sacramento Peak	SDSS	·	850 m	MPC · JPL
800297	2014 EF_{26}	—	February 25, 2014	Kitt Peak	Spacewatch	·	1.9 km	MPC · JPL
800298	2014 EN_{29}	—	February 22, 2014	Mount Lemmon	Mount Lemmon Survey	·	930 m	MPC · JPL
800299	2014 EU_{34}	—	March 8, 2014	Mount Lemmon	Mount Lemmon Survey	URS	2.4 km	MPC · JPL
800300	2014 EQ_{37}	—	March 8, 2014	Mount Lemmon	Mount Lemmon Survey	·	1.6 km	MPC · JPL

== 800301–800400 ==
back to top

Designation			Discovery			Properties		Ref
Permanent	Provisional	Named after	Date	Site	Discoverer(s)	Category	Diam.	Ref
800301	2014 EM_{39}	—	February 27, 2014	Haleakala	Pan-STARRS 1	·	1.1 km	MPC · JPL
800302	2014 EN_{40}	—	March 8, 2014	Mount Lemmon	Mount Lemmon Survey	·	1.5 km	MPC · JPL
800303	2014 EO_{43}	—	February 18, 2008	Mount Lemmon	Mount Lemmon Survey	T_{j} (2.96)	2.6 km	MPC · JPL
800304	2014 EE_{47}	—	March 10, 2014	Kitt Peak	Spacewatch	·	1.8 km	MPC · JPL
800305	2014 EZ_{52}	—	August 2, 2011	Haleakala	Pan-STARRS 1	EOS	1.2 km	MPC · JPL
800306	2014 EJ_{56}	—	June 15, 2015	Haleakala	Pan-STARRS 1	EOS	1.2 km	MPC · JPL
800307	2014 ES_{59}	—	May 20, 2015	Cerro Tololo	DECam	·	1.2 km	MPC · JPL
800308	2014 EB_{61}	—	July 7, 2016	Haleakala	Pan-STARRS 1	·	1.9 km	MPC · JPL
800309	2014 EG_{61}	—	February 24, 2014	Haleakala	Pan-STARRS 1	·	1.6 km	MPC · JPL
800310	2014 EU_{61}	—	March 2, 2014	Cerro Tololo	High Cadence Transient Survey	·	1.1 km	MPC · JPL
800311	2014 ES_{68}	—	April 11, 2010	Kitt Peak	Spacewatch	·	950 m	MPC · JPL
800312	2014 EU_{68}	—	February 28, 2014	Haleakala	Pan-STARRS 1	·	1.6 km	MPC · JPL
800313	2014 EP_{70}	—	November 12, 2012	Mount Lemmon	Mount Lemmon Survey	·	1.2 km	MPC · JPL
800314	2014 EG_{72}	—	April 18, 2015	Cerro Tololo	DECam	L4	5.5 km	MPC · JPL
800315	2014 EH_{72}	—	March 2, 2014	Cerro Tololo	High Cadence Transient Survey	·	1.3 km	MPC · JPL
800316	2014 EE_{78}	—	July 11, 2016	Haleakala	Pan-STARRS 1	·	1.3 km	MPC · JPL
800317	2014 EF_{80}	—	October 7, 2007	Mount Lemmon	Mount Lemmon Survey	·	1.3 km	MPC · JPL
800318	2014 EL_{80}	—	March 2, 2014	Cerro Tololo	High Cadence Transient Survey	·	960 m	MPC · JPL
800319	2014 EZ_{81}	—	January 11, 2008	Kitt Peak	Spacewatch	·	1.8 km	MPC · JPL
800320	2014 EZ_{85}	—	December 3, 2012	Mount Lemmon	Mount Lemmon Survey	·	1.2 km	MPC · JPL
800321	2014 EP_{87}	—	August 26, 2016	Haleakala	Pan-STARRS 1	EOS	1.3 km	MPC · JPL
800322	2014 EF_{89}	—	April 18, 2015	Cerro Tololo	DECam	L4	5.3 km	MPC · JPL
800323	2014 EO_{93}	—	November 7, 2012	Haleakala	Pan-STARRS 1	·	1.5 km	MPC · JPL
800324	2014 EO_{96}	—	October 6, 2016	Haleakala	Pan-STARRS 1	·	1.2 km	MPC · JPL
800325	2014 EJ_{98}	—	November 13, 2017	Haleakala	Pan-STARRS 1	·	1.4 km	MPC · JPL
800326	2014 EK_{98}	—	May 21, 2015	Haleakala	Pan-STARRS 1	·	2.1 km	MPC · JPL
800327	2014 EJ_{100}	—	May 22, 2015	Haleakala	Pan-STARRS 1	·	2.0 km	MPC · JPL
800328	2014 EN_{106}	—	March 3, 2014	Cerro Tololo	High Cadence Transient Survey	·	1.1 km	MPC · JPL
800329	2014 EO_{114}	—	February 26, 2014	Haleakala	Pan-STARRS 1	EOS	1.2 km	MPC · JPL
800330	2014 EG_{115}	—	October 20, 2008	Mount Lemmon	Mount Lemmon Survey	·	610 m	MPC · JPL
800331	2014 EG_{118}	—	March 3, 2014	Cerro Tololo	High Cadence Transient Survey	·	2.1 km	MPC · JPL
800332	2014 EG_{119}	—	April 18, 2015	Cerro Tololo	DECam	L4	5.2 km	MPC · JPL
800333	2014 EJ_{121}	—	February 28, 2014	Haleakala	Pan-STARRS 1	T_{j} (2.97)	1.4 km	MPC · JPL
800334	2014 EO_{121}	—	April 15, 2015	Kitt Peak	Research and Education Collaborative Occultation Network	·	1.7 km	MPC · JPL
800335	2014 EK_{125}	—	October 8, 2012	Haleakala	Pan-STARRS 1	·	1.1 km	MPC · JPL
800336	2014 EA_{126}	—	September 12, 2016	Haleakala	Pan-STARRS 1	·	1.2 km	MPC · JPL
800337	2014 EC_{127}	—	January 11, 2008	Kitt Peak	Spacewatch	·	2.1 km	MPC · JPL
800338	2014 EX_{127}	—	October 22, 2017	Mount Lemmon	Mount Lemmon Survey	EOS	1.1 km	MPC · JPL
800339	2014 EQ_{129}	—	March 3, 2014	Cerro Tololo	High Cadence Transient Survey	·	770 m	MPC · JPL
800340	2014 ES_{134}	—	February 28, 2014	Haleakala	Pan-STARRS 1	·	1.8 km	MPC · JPL
800341	2014 ET_{136}	—	February 28, 2014	Haleakala	Pan-STARRS 1	·	1.1 km	MPC · JPL
800342	2014 EM_{137}	—	October 15, 2017	Mount Lemmon	Mount Lemmon Survey	·	1.8 km	MPC · JPL
800343	2014 EN_{138}	—	March 3, 2014	Cerro Tololo	High Cadence Transient Survey	·	1.4 km	MPC · JPL
800344	2014 EP_{139}	—	October 18, 2012	Haleakala	Pan-STARRS 1	·	1.4 km	MPC · JPL
800345	2014 EZ_{139}	—	March 3, 2014	Cerro Tololo	High Cadence Transient Survey	·	2.0 km	MPC · JPL
800346	2014 EP_{141}	—	March 9, 2014	Calar Alto	S. Hellmich, G. Proffe	·	1.8 km	MPC · JPL
800347	2014 ER_{142}	—	September 2, 2010	Mount Lemmon	Mount Lemmon Survey	·	1.9 km	MPC · JPL
800348	2014 EL_{144}	—	August 29, 2016	Mount Lemmon	Mount Lemmon Survey	EOS	1.4 km	MPC · JPL
800349	2014 EV_{145}	—	October 22, 2012	Mount Lemmon	Mount Lemmon Survey	·	1.2 km	MPC · JPL
800350	2014 EU_{147}	—	February 28, 2014	Haleakala	Pan-STARRS 1	·	810 m	MPC · JPL
800351	2014 EK_{148}	—	April 19, 2009	Mount Lemmon	Mount Lemmon Survey	·	1.7 km	MPC · JPL
800352	2014 EE_{149}	—	February 10, 2014	Haleakala	Pan-STARRS 1	·	1.6 km	MPC · JPL
800353	2014 ET_{154}	—	November 4, 2012	Mount Lemmon	Mount Lemmon Survey	·	970 m	MPC · JPL
800354	2014 EG_{156}	—	April 2, 2014	Mount Lemmon	Mount Lemmon Survey	·	1.2 km	MPC · JPL
800355	2014 EN_{160}	—	September 30, 2017	Haleakala	Pan-STARRS 1	·	1.8 km	MPC · JPL
800356	2014 EA_{162}	—	October 27, 2017	Mount Lemmon	Mount Lemmon Survey	EOS	1.6 km	MPC · JPL
800357	2014 EV_{163}	—	March 4, 2014	Cerro Tololo	High Cadence Transient Survey	·	1.5 km	MPC · JPL
800358	2014 EB_{167}	—	May 20, 2015	Cerro Tololo	DECam	·	1.9 km	MPC · JPL
800359	2014 EZ_{167}	—	October 10, 2012	Mount Lemmon	Mount Lemmon Survey	·	700 m	MPC · JPL
800360	2014 EB_{168}	—	July 11, 2016	Haleakala	Pan-STARRS 1	·	2.2 km	MPC · JPL
800361	2014 EZ_{170}	—	March 5, 2014	Haleakala	Pan-STARRS 1	·	1.6 km	MPC · JPL
800362	2014 EK_{174}	—	August 8, 2016	Haleakala	Pan-STARRS 1	VER	1.9 km	MPC · JPL
800363	2014 ES_{174}	—	March 4, 2014	Cerro Tololo	High Cadence Transient Survey	·	1.2 km	MPC · JPL
800364	2014 EV_{175}	—	September 2, 2017	Haleakala	Pan-STARRS 1	EUP	2.4 km	MPC · JPL
800365	2014 EE_{182}	—	February 28, 2014	Haleakala	Pan-STARRS 1	·	660 m	MPC · JPL
800366	2014 ED_{183}	—	August 24, 2011	XuYi	PMO NEO Survey Program	·	850 m	MPC · JPL
800367	2014 ET_{189}	—	May 20, 2015	Cerro Tololo	DECam	·	1.3 km	MPC · JPL
800368	2014 EO_{196}	—	February 28, 2014	Haleakala	Pan-STARRS 1	·	1.0 km	MPC · JPL
800369	2014 EQ_{196}	—	March 4, 2014	Cerro Tololo	High Cadence Transient Survey	·	1.8 km	MPC · JPL
800370	2014 EV_{196}	—	August 1, 2016	Haleakala	Pan-STARRS 1	·	1.6 km	MPC · JPL
800371	2014 EV_{197}	—	January 28, 2014	Kitt Peak	Spacewatch	·	1.9 km	MPC · JPL
800372	2014 EV_{199}	—	September 20, 2011	Haleakala	Pan-STARRS 1	EUN	720 m	MPC · JPL
800373	2014 EZ_{202}	—	February 28, 2014	Haleakala	Pan-STARRS 1	·	1.3 km	MPC · JPL
800374	2014 EV_{204}	—	May 21, 2015	Haleakala	Pan-STARRS 1	EOS	1.1 km	MPC · JPL
800375	2014 EH_{205}	—	April 17, 2015	Cerro Tololo	DECam	L4	6.0 km	MPC · JPL
800376	2014 EH_{207}	—	April 18, 2015	Cerro Tololo	DECam	L4	5.3 km	MPC · JPL
800377	2014 EV_{208}	—	September 23, 2017	Haleakala	Pan-STARRS 1	·	1.6 km	MPC · JPL
800378	2014 EW_{212}	—	November 21, 2017	Haleakala	Pan-STARRS 1	·	1.1 km	MPC · JPL
800379	2014 EY_{218}	—	February 26, 2014	Haleakala	Pan-STARRS 1	·	850 m	MPC · JPL
800380	2014 EL_{220}	—	March 5, 2014	Cerro Tololo	High Cadence Transient Survey	·	1.2 km	MPC · JPL
800381	2014 EC_{225}	—	August 2, 2016	Haleakala	Pan-STARRS 1	EOS	1.3 km	MPC · JPL
800382	2014 EA_{227}	—	April 23, 2015	Haleakala	Pan-STARRS 1	·	2.2 km	MPC · JPL
800383	2014 EE_{229}	—	May 20, 2015	Cerro Tololo	DECam	·	1.8 km	MPC · JPL
800384	2014 EV_{229}	—	April 25, 2015	Haleakala	Pan-STARRS 1	·	2.3 km	MPC · JPL
800385	2014 EC_{230}	—	September 22, 2011	Kitt Peak	Spacewatch	·	1.7 km	MPC · JPL
800386	2014 EX_{237}	—	March 24, 2014	Haleakala	Pan-STARRS 1	·	2.0 km	MPC · JPL
800387	2014 EE_{239}	—	August 26, 2016	Haleakala	Pan-STARRS 1	·	2.3 km	MPC · JPL
800388	2014 EA_{242}	—	August 8, 2016	Haleakala	Pan-STARRS 1	·	1.2 km	MPC · JPL
800389	2014 EF_{244}	—	February 28, 2014	Haleakala	Pan-STARRS 1	(5)	820 m	MPC · JPL
800390	2014 ED_{245}	—	March 5, 2014	Cerro Tololo	High Cadence Transient Survey	·	1.9 km	MPC · JPL
800391	2014 ET_{247}	—	February 28, 2014	Haleakala	Pan-STARRS 1	L4	5.7 km	MPC · JPL
800392	2014 EK_{248}	—	November 6, 2010	Mount Lemmon	Mount Lemmon Survey	L4	6.1 km	MPC · JPL
800393	2014 EE_{250}	—	March 8, 2014	Mount Lemmon	Mount Lemmon Survey	·	2.5 km	MPC · JPL
800394	2014 EF_{251}	—	March 12, 2014	Haleakala	Pan-STARRS 1	·	1.1 km	MPC · JPL
800395	2014 EV_{251}	—	December 8, 2012	Mount Lemmon	Mount Lemmon Survey	·	1.8 km	MPC · JPL
800396	2014 EW_{251}	—	March 11, 2014	Mount Lemmon	Mount Lemmon Survey	·	2.0 km	MPC · JPL
800397	2014 EX_{252}	—	March 11, 2014	Mount Lemmon	Mount Lemmon Survey	·	2.1 km	MPC · JPL
800398	2014 EB_{253}	—	March 7, 2014	Mount Lemmon	Mount Lemmon Survey	·	2.1 km	MPC · JPL
800399	2014 EG_{253}	—	March 12, 2014	Mount Lemmon	Mount Lemmon Survey	·	2.5 km	MPC · JPL
800400	2014 EO_{253}	—	March 11, 2014	Mount Lemmon	Mount Lemmon Survey	THB · critical	2.1 km	MPC · JPL

== 800401–800500 ==
back to top

Designation			Discovery			Properties		Ref
Permanent	Provisional	Named after	Date	Site	Discoverer(s)	Category	Diam.	Ref
800401	2014 ER_{253}	—	March 12, 2014	Mount Lemmon	Mount Lemmon Survey	·	1.6 km	MPC · JPL
800402	2014 ED_{254}	—	March 6, 2014	Mount Lemmon	Mount Lemmon Survey	THM	1.3 km	MPC · JPL
800403	2014 EM_{254}	—	March 8, 2014	Mount Lemmon	Mount Lemmon Survey	EMA	2.0 km	MPC · JPL
800404	2014 EP_{254}	—	March 12, 2014	Mount Lemmon	Mount Lemmon Survey	·	1.6 km	MPC · JPL
800405	2014 EQ_{255}	—	March 10, 2014	Kitt Peak	Spacewatch	·	650 m	MPC · JPL
800406	2014 EN_{257}	—	March 11, 2014	Mount Lemmon	Mount Lemmon Survey	L4	6.8 km	MPC · JPL
800407	2014 EX_{257}	—	March 11, 2014	Mount Lemmon	Mount Lemmon Survey	·	2.4 km	MPC · JPL
800408	2014 ER_{258}	—	March 12, 2014	Mount Lemmon	Mount Lemmon Survey	TEL	1.2 km	MPC · JPL
800409	2014 EO_{259}	—	March 12, 2014	Mount Lemmon	Mount Lemmon Survey	·	1.7 km	MPC · JPL
800410	2014 FS	—	April 18, 2006	Palomar Mountain	NEAT	H	490 m	MPC · JPL
800411	2014 FA_{2}	—	March 20, 2014	Mount Lemmon	Mount Lemmon Survey	·	2.1 km	MPC · JPL
800412	2014 FK_{2}	—	January 6, 2008	Mauna Kea	P. A. Wiegert	·	1.9 km	MPC · JPL
800413	2014 FN_{2}	—	March 5, 2014	Bergisch Gladbach	W. Bickel	·	1.4 km	MPC · JPL
800414	2014 FY_{3}	—	March 12, 2014	Mount Lemmon	Mount Lemmon Survey	·	1.5 km	MPC · JPL
800415	2014 FQ_{4}	—	March 20, 2014	Mount Lemmon	Mount Lemmon Survey	·	1.7 km	MPC · JPL
800416	2014 FH_{5}	—	March 20, 2014	Mount Lemmon	Mount Lemmon Survey	·	1.8 km	MPC · JPL
800417	2014 FZ_{7}	—	February 26, 2014	Haleakala	Pan-STARRS 1	·	2.1 km	MPC · JPL
800418	2014 FG_{10}	—	March 20, 2014	Mount Lemmon	Mount Lemmon Survey	·	1.9 km	MPC · JPL
800419	2014 FS_{13}	—	March 20, 2014	Mount Lemmon	Mount Lemmon Survey	·	1.3 km	MPC · JPL
800420	2014 FV_{16}	—	February 28, 2014	Haleakala	Pan-STARRS 1	LIX	2.2 km	MPC · JPL
800421	2014 FX_{16}	—	March 21, 2009	Kitt Peak	Spacewatch	·	1.6 km	MPC · JPL
800422	2014 FE_{17}	—	August 25, 2004	Kitt Peak	Spacewatch	·	2.0 km	MPC · JPL
800423	2014 FB_{21}	—	March 23, 2014	Kitt Peak	Spacewatch	·	2.0 km	MPC · JPL
800424	2014 FJ_{22}	—	February 28, 2014	Haleakala	Pan-STARRS 1	MAR	670 m	MPC · JPL
800425	2014 FB_{24}	—	February 28, 2014	Haleakala	Pan-STARRS 1	EOS	1.3 km	MPC · JPL
800426	2014 FC_{28}	—	February 28, 2014	Haleakala	Pan-STARRS 1	·	1.8 km	MPC · JPL
800427	2014 FX_{35}	—	March 24, 2014	Haleakala	Pan-STARRS 1	·	1.1 km	MPC · JPL
800428	2014 FK_{37}	—	March 26, 2003	Kitt Peak	Spacewatch	NYS	820 m	MPC · JPL
800429	2014 FA_{46}	—	March 12, 2014	Mount Lemmon	Mount Lemmon Survey	·	2.2 km	MPC · JPL
800430	2014 FO_{46}	—	March 26, 2014	Mount Lemmon	Mount Lemmon Survey	·	1.8 km	MPC · JPL
800431	2014 FQ_{46}	—	October 8, 2004	Kitt Peak	Spacewatch	·	1.3 km	MPC · JPL
800432	2014 FU_{55}	—	February 26, 2014	Haleakala	Pan-STARRS 1	·	770 m	MPC · JPL
800433	2014 FQ_{59}	—	March 30, 2014	Cerro Tololo	DECam	L4	4.8 km	MPC · JPL
800434	2014 FW_{60}	—	March 10, 2014	Kitt Peak	Spacewatch	·	710 m	MPC · JPL
800435	2014 FN_{64}	—	February 26, 2014	Haleakala	Pan-STARRS 1	MAS	590 m	MPC · JPL
800436	2014 FN_{66}	—	April 10, 2014	Haleakala	Pan-STARRS 1	·	1.4 km	MPC · JPL
800437	2014 FD_{72}	—	March 22, 2015	Haleakala	Pan-STARRS 1	L4 · ERY	5.8 km	MPC · JPL
800438	2014 FG_{77}	—	May 2, 2001	Palomar Mountain	NEAT	·	1.2 km	MPC · JPL
800439	2014 FU_{77}	—	January 11, 2008	Kitt Peak	Spacewatch	·	2.0 km	MPC · JPL
800440	2014 FQ_{78}	—	March 22, 2014	Mount Lemmon	Mount Lemmon Survey	·	1.7 km	MPC · JPL
800441	2014 FH_{79}	—	September 30, 2017	Haleakala	Pan-STARRS 1	·	2.5 km	MPC · JPL
800442	2014 FB_{80}	—	March 17, 2018	Mount Lemmon	Mount Lemmon Survey	·	800 m	MPC · JPL
800443	2014 FE_{81}	—	July 5, 2016	Mount Lemmon	Mount Lemmon Survey	·	1.7 km	MPC · JPL
800444	2014 FA_{82}	—	March 24, 2014	Haleakala	Pan-STARRS 1	NEM	1.5 km	MPC · JPL
800445	2014 FD_{82}	—	March 28, 2014	Mount Lemmon	Mount Lemmon Survey	·	1.8 km	MPC · JPL
800446	2014 FG_{82}	—	March 24, 2014	Haleakala	Pan-STARRS 1	·	1.9 km	MPC · JPL
800447	2014 FH_{82}	—	March 26, 2014	Mount Lemmon	Mount Lemmon Survey	·	2.0 km	MPC · JPL
800448	2014 FL_{82}	—	March 25, 2014	Mount Lemmon	Mount Lemmon Survey	·	1.2 km	MPC · JPL
800449	2014 FM_{82}	—	March 31, 2014	Mount Lemmon	Mount Lemmon Survey	·	1.9 km	MPC · JPL
800450	2014 FS_{82}	—	March 23, 2014	Mount Lemmon	Mount Lemmon Survey	·	2.1 km	MPC · JPL
800451	2014 FK_{83}	—	March 24, 2014	Haleakala	Pan-STARRS 1	·	2.2 km	MPC · JPL
800452	2014 FS_{83}	—	March 22, 2014	Mount Lemmon	Mount Lemmon Survey	critical	1.7 km	MPC · JPL
800453	2014 FA_{84}	—	March 24, 2014	Haleakala	Pan-STARRS 1	·	1.5 km	MPC · JPL
800454	2014 FF_{84}	—	March 28, 2014	Mount Lemmon	Mount Lemmon Survey	·	2.3 km	MPC · JPL
800455	2014 FY_{84}	—	March 31, 2014	Mount Lemmon	Mount Lemmon Survey	·	2.1 km	MPC · JPL
800456	2014 FC_{85}	—	March 29, 2014	Mount Lemmon	Mount Lemmon Survey	·	1.7 km	MPC · JPL
800457 Floriangoebel	2014 FC_{86}	Floriangoebel	March 27, 2014	Roque de los Muchachos	EURONEAR	·	1.3 km	MPC · JPL
800458	2014 FG_{87}	—	March 28, 2014	Mount Lemmon	Mount Lemmon Survey	·	2.1 km	MPC · JPL
800459	2014 FR_{87}	—	February 26, 2014	Haleakala	Pan-STARRS 1	·	1.7 km	MPC · JPL
800460	2014 FV_{87}	—	March 22, 2014	Mount Lemmon	Mount Lemmon Survey	TIR	1.7 km	MPC · JPL
800461	2014 FS_{88}	—	March 24, 2014	Haleakala	Pan-STARRS 1	EOS	1.3 km	MPC · JPL
800462	2014 FA_{90}	—	March 28, 2014	Mount Lemmon	Mount Lemmon Survey	L4	5.6 km	MPC · JPL
800463	2014 FM_{90}	—	December 17, 2018	Haleakala	Pan-STARRS 1	·	1.2 km	MPC · JPL
800464	2014 FO_{92}	—	November 21, 2017	Haleakala	Pan-STARRS 1	·	1.3 km	MPC · JPL
800465	2014 FW_{96}	—	March 24, 2014	Haleakala	Pan-STARRS 1	·	2.1 km	MPC · JPL
800466	2014 GR_{2}	—	February 28, 2014	Haleakala	Pan-STARRS 1	·	2.0 km	MPC · JPL
800467	2014 GW_{2}	—	April 1, 2014	Mount Lemmon	Mount Lemmon Survey	·	860 m	MPC · JPL
800468	2014 GE_{5}	—	February 22, 2014	Mount Lemmon	Mount Lemmon Survey	T_{j} (2.96)	2.1 km	MPC · JPL
800469	2014 GK_{5}	—	February 26, 2014	Haleakala	Pan-STARRS 1	·	1.7 km	MPC · JPL
800470	2014 GE_{10}	—	April 2, 2014	Mount Lemmon	Mount Lemmon Survey	·	770 m	MPC · JPL
800471	2014 GP_{10}	—	January 31, 2008	Mount Lemmon	Mount Lemmon Survey	·	1.8 km	MPC · JPL
800472	2014 GA_{11}	—	February 26, 2014	Haleakala	Pan-STARRS 1	·	940 m	MPC · JPL
800473	2014 GX_{12}	—	April 2, 2014	Mount Lemmon	Mount Lemmon Survey	·	2.1 km	MPC · JPL
800474	2014 GJ_{13}	—	February 9, 2010	Kitt Peak	Spacewatch	·	1.2 km	MPC · JPL
800475	2014 GJ_{16}	—	April 2, 2014	Mount Lemmon	Mount Lemmon Survey	·	2.0 km	MPC · JPL
800476	2014 GV_{19}	—	April 4, 2014	Mount Lemmon	Mount Lemmon Survey	·	870 m	MPC · JPL
800477	2014 GN_{21}	—	September 29, 2011	Mount Lemmon	Mount Lemmon Survey	·	1.5 km	MPC · JPL
800478	2014 GY_{26}	—	March 12, 2014	Mount Lemmon	Mount Lemmon Survey	·	2.5 km	MPC · JPL
800479	2014 GP_{29}	—	September 26, 2012	Haleakala	Pan-STARRS 1	H	520 m	MPC · JPL
800480	2014 GG_{30}	—	October 1, 2010	Kitt Peak	Spacewatch	THM	1.9 km	MPC · JPL
800481	2014 GT_{32}	—	March 25, 2014	Kitt Peak	Spacewatch	·	740 m	MPC · JPL
800482	2014 GN_{33}	—	April 5, 2014	Haleakala	Pan-STARRS 1	T_{j} (2.93)	1.5 km	MPC · JPL
800483	2014 GU_{39}	—	February 28, 2014	Haleakala	Pan-STARRS 1	T_{j} (2.98)	2.3 km	MPC · JPL
800484	2014 GS_{43}	—	April 6, 2014	Mount Lemmon	Mount Lemmon Survey	·	2.2 km	MPC · JPL
800485	2014 GY_{46}	—	April 26, 2003	Kitt Peak	Spacewatch	H	420 m	MPC · JPL
800486	2014 GE_{52}	—	April 9, 2014	Haleakala	Pan-STARRS 1	RAF	610 m	MPC · JPL
800487	2014 GG_{52}	—	April 9, 2014	Haleakala	Pan-STARRS 1	·	2.0 km	MPC · JPL
800488	2014 GJ_{53}	—	April 1, 2014	Catalina	CSS	T_{j} (2.98) · critical	3.0 km	MPC · JPL
800489	2014 GX_{55}	—	March 31, 2014	Kitt Peak	Spacewatch	·	2.0 km	MPC · JPL
800490	2014 GB_{56}	—	April 9, 2014	Kitt Peak	Spacewatch	THB	1.9 km	MPC · JPL
800491	2014 GC_{56}	—	April 10, 2014	Haleakala	Pan-STARRS 1	·	2.5 km	MPC · JPL
800492	2014 GG_{60}	—	February 17, 2010	Mount Lemmon	Mount Lemmon Survey	·	840 m	MPC · JPL
800493	2014 GO_{60}	—	April 4, 2014	Haleakala	Pan-STARRS 1	·	830 m	MPC · JPL
800494	2014 GB_{61}	—	April 4, 2014	Haleakala	Pan-STARRS 1	·	1.3 km	MPC · JPL
800495	2014 GP_{63}	—	April 5, 2014	Haleakala	Pan-STARRS 1	THM	1.8 km	MPC · JPL
800496	2014 GY_{67}	—	April 5, 2014	Haleakala	Pan-STARRS 1	·	2.0 km	MPC · JPL
800497	2014 GU_{69}	—	July 25, 2015	Haleakala	Pan-STARRS 1	·	1.3 km	MPC · JPL
800498	2014 GA_{70}	—	August 29, 2016	Mount Lemmon	Mount Lemmon Survey	·	2.2 km	MPC · JPL
800499	2014 GN_{70}	—	April 5, 2014	Haleakala	Pan-STARRS 1	·	2.2 km	MPC · JPL
800500	2014 GT_{70}	—	March 26, 2014	Mount Lemmon	Mount Lemmon Survey	·	1.4 km	MPC · JPL

== 800501–800600 ==
back to top

Designation			Discovery			Properties		Ref
Permanent	Provisional	Named after	Date	Site	Discoverer(s)	Category	Diam.	Ref
800501	2014 GL_{71}	—	April 10, 2014	Haleakala	Pan-STARRS 1	·	1.8 km	MPC · JPL
800502	2014 GU_{71}	—	April 1, 2014	Mount Lemmon	Mount Lemmon Survey	·	2.1 km	MPC · JPL
800503	2014 GO_{72}	—	April 5, 2014	Haleakala	Pan-STARRS 1	·	1.8 km	MPC · JPL
800504	2014 GB_{74}	—	April 5, 2014	Haleakala	Pan-STARRS 1	·	1.1 km	MPC · JPL
800505	2014 GC_{77}	—	April 4, 2014	Haleakala	Pan-STARRS 1	·	2.4 km	MPC · JPL
800506	2014 GG_{77}	—	April 5, 2014	Haleakala	Pan-STARRS 1	THB · critical	1.7 km	MPC · JPL
800507	2014 GL_{77}	—	April 5, 2014	Haleakala	Pan-STARRS 1	VER	2.3 km	MPC · JPL
800508	2014 GV_{77}	—	April 6, 2014	Mount Lemmon	Mount Lemmon Survey	URS	2.4 km	MPC · JPL
800509	2014 GA_{78}	—	April 8, 2014	Haleakala	Pan-STARRS 1	·	1.9 km	MPC · JPL
800510	2014 GB_{78}	—	April 5, 2014	Haleakala	Pan-STARRS 1	·	1.8 km	MPC · JPL
800511	2014 GE_{78}	—	April 2, 2014	Kitt Peak	Spacewatch	·	2.1 km	MPC · JPL
800512	2014 GF_{78}	—	April 4, 2014	Haleakala	Pan-STARRS 1	·	2.1 km	MPC · JPL
800513	2014 GZ_{78}	—	April 10, 2014	Haleakala	Pan-STARRS 1	EUN	870 m	MPC · JPL
800514	2014 GY_{79}	—	April 5, 2014	Haleakala	Pan-STARRS 1	EOS	1.4 km	MPC · JPL
800515	2014 GA_{81}	—	April 5, 2014	Haleakala	Pan-STARRS 1	URS	2.1 km	MPC · JPL
800516	2014 GO_{82}	—	April 4, 2014	Haleakala	Pan-STARRS 1	MAR	890 m	MPC · JPL
800517	2014 GK_{85}	—	April 5, 2014	Haleakala	Pan-STARRS 1	·	1.8 km	MPC · JPL
800518	2014 GD_{86}	—	April 5, 2014	Haleakala	Pan-STARRS 1	VER	2.2 km	MPC · JPL
800519	2014 GU_{86}	—	April 5, 2014	Haleakala	Pan-STARRS 1	·	1.9 km	MPC · JPL
800520	2014 GV_{87}	—	April 1, 2014	Mount Lemmon	Mount Lemmon Survey	EOS	1.3 km	MPC · JPL
800521	2014 GM_{88}	—	April 5, 2014	Haleakala	Pan-STARRS 1	·	2.3 km	MPC · JPL
800522	2014 GP_{88}	—	April 5, 2014	Haleakala	Pan-STARRS 1	EOS	1.4 km	MPC · JPL
800523	2014 GW_{88}	—	April 5, 2014	Haleakala	Pan-STARRS 1	·	1.0 km	MPC · JPL
800524	2014 GJ_{91}	—	April 5, 2014	Haleakala	Pan-STARRS 1	·	1.9 km	MPC · JPL
800525	2014 GR_{91}	—	April 10, 2014	Haleakala	Pan-STARRS 1	·	1.3 km	MPC · JPL
800526	2014 GC_{92}	—	April 5, 2014	Haleakala	Pan-STARRS 1	·	920 m	MPC · JPL
800527	2014 GJ_{93}	—	April 5, 2014	Haleakala	Pan-STARRS 1	EOS	1.4 km	MPC · JPL
800528	2014 GR_{98}	—	April 5, 2014	Haleakala	Pan-STARRS 1	VER	1.8 km	MPC · JPL
800529	2014 GT_{98}	—	April 5, 2014	Haleakala	Pan-STARRS 1	·	1.8 km	MPC · JPL
800530	2014 GA_{99}	—	April 5, 2014	Haleakala	Pan-STARRS 1	·	1.8 km	MPC · JPL
800531	2014 GC_{99}	—	April 5, 2014	Haleakala	Pan-STARRS 1	VER	2.0 km	MPC · JPL
800532	2014 GJ_{100}	—	April 8, 2014	Mount Lemmon	Mount Lemmon Survey	THB	2.1 km	MPC · JPL
800533	2014 GT_{103}	—	April 9, 2014	Haleakala	Pan-STARRS 1	·	2.0 km	MPC · JPL
800534	2014 HS_{8}	—	March 25, 2014	Kitt Peak	Spacewatch	·	2.3 km	MPC · JPL
800535	2014 HC_{13}	—	January 17, 2013	Haleakala	Pan-STARRS 1	·	1.5 km	MPC · JPL
800536	2014 HQ_{14}	—	March 22, 2014	Kitt Peak	Spacewatch	·	2.2 km	MPC · JPL
800537	2014 HO_{16}	—	April 5, 2014	Haleakala	Pan-STARRS 1	·	1.9 km	MPC · JPL
800538	2014 HY_{16}	—	March 26, 2014	Kitt Peak	Spacewatch	·	1.0 km	MPC · JPL
800539	2014 HU_{22}	—	April 21, 2014	Mount Lemmon	Mount Lemmon Survey	·	1.5 km	MPC · JPL
800540	2014 HZ_{22}	—	April 8, 2014	Haleakala	Pan-STARRS 1	EUP	2.5 km	MPC · JPL
800541	2014 HW_{26}	—	April 4, 2014	Haleakala	Pan-STARRS 1	H	380 m	MPC · JPL
800542	2014 HB_{28}	—	April 24, 2014	Haleakala	Pan-STARRS 1	H	410 m	MPC · JPL
800543	2014 HT_{32}	—	March 27, 2014	Haleakala	Pan-STARRS 1	·	1.1 km	MPC · JPL
800544	2014 HC_{34}	—	February 7, 2008	Mount Lemmon	Mount Lemmon Survey	·	1.6 km	MPC · JPL
800545	2014 HJ_{34}	—	April 6, 2014	Kitt Peak	Spacewatch	·	2.3 km	MPC · JPL
800546	2014 HD_{35}	—	January 11, 2010	Kitt Peak	Spacewatch	·	790 m	MPC · JPL
800547	2014 HN_{35}	—	April 24, 2014	Mount Lemmon	Mount Lemmon Survey	(31811)	2.0 km	MPC · JPL
800548	2014 HR_{39}	—	April 24, 2014	Mount Lemmon	Mount Lemmon Survey	·	2.4 km	MPC · JPL
800549	2014 HZ_{40}	—	April 24, 2014	Mount Lemmon	Mount Lemmon Survey	·	2.1 km	MPC · JPL
800550	2014 HG_{41}	—	April 5, 2014	Haleakala	Pan-STARRS 1	·	1.8 km	MPC · JPL
800551	2014 HD_{42}	—	April 23, 2014	Haleakala	Pan-STARRS 1	·	2.2 km	MPC · JPL
800552	2014 HE_{45}	—	April 24, 2014	Haleakala	Pan-STARRS 1	·	2.3 km	MPC · JPL
800553	2014 HY_{45}	—	April 5, 2014	Haleakala	Pan-STARRS 1	PHO	630 m	MPC · JPL
800554	2014 HN_{49}	—	March 3, 2008	Mount Lemmon	Mount Lemmon Survey	·	2.0 km	MPC · JPL
800555	2014 HR_{50}	—	April 5, 2014	Haleakala	Pan-STARRS 1	TIR	1.8 km	MPC · JPL
800556	2014 HM_{51}	—	April 23, 2014	Cerro Tololo-DECam	DECam	·	1.8 km	MPC · JPL
800557	2014 HG_{52}	—	April 23, 2014	Cerro Tololo-DECam	DECam	LIX	2.1 km	MPC · JPL
800558	2014 HQ_{52}	—	April 2, 2014	Kitt Peak	Spacewatch	·	1.6 km	MPC · JPL
800559	2014 HT_{54}	—	April 23, 2014	Cerro Tololo-DECam	DECam	·	1.1 km	MPC · JPL
800560	2014 HG_{55}	—	November 4, 2005	Kitt Peak	Spacewatch	·	2.2 km	MPC · JPL
800561	2014 HJ_{58}	—	April 2, 2014	Mount Lemmon	Mount Lemmon Survey	VER	2.1 km	MPC · JPL
800562	2014 HK_{60}	—	September 4, 2010	Mount Lemmon	Mount Lemmon Survey	·	1.8 km	MPC · JPL
800563	2014 HM_{62}	—	September 30, 2016	Haleakala	Pan-STARRS 1	·	2.0 km	MPC · JPL
800564	2014 HE_{63}	—	April 23, 2014	Cerro Tololo-DECam	DECam	·	1.2 km	MPC · JPL
800565	2014 HS_{66}	—	April 23, 2014	Cerro Tololo-DECam	DECam	·	2.1 km	MPC · JPL
800566	2014 HY_{70}	—	June 26, 2015	Haleakala	Pan-STARRS 1	KOR	900 m	MPC · JPL
800567	2014 HP_{71}	—	January 31, 2006	Kitt Peak	Spacewatch	MAS	600 m	MPC · JPL
800568	2014 HV_{71}	—	April 5, 2014	Haleakala	Pan-STARRS 1	EOS	1.4 km	MPC · JPL
800569	2014 HZ_{71}	—	October 4, 1999	Kitt Peak	Spacewatch	·	1.8 km	MPC · JPL
800570	2014 HB_{76}	—	April 23, 2014	Cerro Tololo-DECam	DECam	·	1.2 km	MPC · JPL
800571	2014 HM_{77}	—	August 22, 2003	Palomar Mountain	NEAT	·	940 m	MPC · JPL
800572	2014 HH_{80}	—	April 20, 2014	Mount Lemmon	Mount Lemmon Survey	·	1.8 km	MPC · JPL
800573	2014 HR_{81}	—	April 23, 2014	Cerro Tololo-DECam	DECam	·	1.4 km	MPC · JPL
800574	2014 HO_{82}	—	April 23, 2014	Cerro Tololo-DECam	DECam	·	750 m	MPC · JPL
800575	2014 HR_{83}	—	April 23, 2014	Cerro Tololo-DECam	DECam	·	2.0 km	MPC · JPL
800576	2014 HQ_{84}	—	September 21, 2011	Kitt Peak	Spacewatch	·	2.5 km	MPC · JPL
800577	2014 HT_{84}	—	April 4, 2014	Haleakala	Pan-STARRS 1	TIR	1.9 km	MPC · JPL
800578	2014 HD_{86}	—	November 2, 2010	Mount Lemmon	Mount Lemmon Survey	·	2.1 km	MPC · JPL
800579	2014 HO_{87}	—	April 23, 2014	Cerro Tololo-DECam	DECam	·	2.2 km	MPC · JPL
800580	2014 HL_{88}	—	October 17, 2010	Mount Lemmon	Mount Lemmon Survey	·	2.0 km	MPC · JPL
800581	2014 HE_{90}	—	October 27, 2011	Mount Lemmon	Mount Lemmon Survey	·	1.8 km	MPC · JPL
800582	2014 HN_{90}	—	April 23, 2014	Cerro Tololo-DECam	DECam	·	2.0 km	MPC · JPL
800583	2014 HE_{91}	—	April 23, 2014	Cerro Tololo-DECam	DECam	·	1.8 km	MPC · JPL
800584	2014 HU_{92}	—	April 23, 2014	Cerro Tololo-DECam	DECam	·	1.9 km	MPC · JPL
800585	2014 HO_{97}	—	October 26, 2016	Mount Lemmon	Mount Lemmon Survey	EOS	1.2 km	MPC · JPL
800586	2014 HT_{98}	—	July 24, 2015	Haleakala	Pan-STARRS 1	·	1 km	MPC · JPL
800587	2014 HM_{102}	—	April 5, 2014	Haleakala	Pan-STARRS 1	·	2.1 km	MPC · JPL
800588	2014 HU_{102}	—	April 23, 2014	Cerro Tololo-DECam	DECam	·	1.9 km	MPC · JPL
800589	2014 HS_{105}	—	April 23, 2014	Cerro Tololo-DECam	DECam	·	1.8 km	MPC · JPL
800590	2014 HD_{107}	—	April 24, 2014	Mount Lemmon	Mount Lemmon Survey	·	2.3 km	MPC · JPL
800591	2014 HZ_{108}	—	September 8, 2016	Haleakala	Pan-STARRS 1	·	2.2 km	MPC · JPL
800592	2014 HH_{109}	—	January 3, 2013	ASC-Kislovodsk	Nevski, V.	·	2.1 km	MPC · JPL
800593	2014 HL_{109}	—	April 24, 2014	Mount Lemmon	Mount Lemmon Survey	·	1.8 km	MPC · JPL
800594	2014 HF_{110}	—	April 23, 2014	Cerro Tololo-DECam	DECam	·	1.9 km	MPC · JPL
800595	2014 HK_{113}	—	April 24, 2014	Mount Lemmon	Mount Lemmon Survey	·	2.2 km	MPC · JPL
800596	2014 HN_{114}	—	April 23, 2014	Cerro Tololo-DECam	DECam	·	1.7 km	MPC · JPL
800597	2014 HD_{118}	—	April 23, 2014	Cerro Tololo-DECam	DECam	·	1.9 km	MPC · JPL
800598	2014 HT_{119}	—	April 23, 2014	Cerro Tololo-DECam	DECam	EOS	1.1 km	MPC · JPL
800599	2014 HD_{124}	—	April 24, 2014	Haleakala	Pan-STARRS 1	AMO · APO	380 m	MPC · JPL
800600	2014 HU_{128}	—	March 29, 2014	Mount Lemmon	Mount Lemmon Survey	·	2.1 km	MPC · JPL

== 800601–800700 ==
back to top

Designation			Discovery			Properties		Ref
Permanent	Provisional	Named after	Date	Site	Discoverer(s)	Category	Diam.	Ref
800601	2014 HU_{129}	—	April 22, 2014	Calar Alto-CASADO	Mottola, S., Hellmich, S.	·	1.7 km	MPC · JPL
800602	2014 HV_{129}	—	April 23, 2014	Mount Lemmon	Mount Lemmon Survey	·	2.0 km	MPC · JPL
800603	2014 HU_{130}	—	March 24, 2014	Haleakala	Pan-STARRS 1	·	1.2 km	MPC · JPL
800604	2014 HH_{131}	—	June 18, 2007	Kitt Peak	Spacewatch	·	750 m	MPC · JPL
800605	2014 HO_{131}	—	March 25, 2014	Mount Lemmon	Mount Lemmon Survey	·	2.1 km	MPC · JPL
800606	2014 HE_{132}	—	April 24, 2014	Mount Lemmon	Mount Lemmon Survey	·	1.9 km	MPC · JPL
800607	2014 HP_{133}	—	April 27, 2008	Mount Lemmon	Mount Lemmon Survey	·	2.5 km	MPC · JPL
800608	2014 HG_{137}	—	April 5, 2014	Haleakala	Pan-STARRS 1	·	1.5 km	MPC · JPL
800609	2014 HD_{146}	—	March 24, 2014	Haleakala	Pan-STARRS 1	·	1.3 km	MPC · JPL
800610	2014 HQ_{146}	—	February 28, 2014	Haleakala	Pan-STARRS 1	HYG	1.9 km	MPC · JPL
800611	2014 HT_{150}	—	April 23, 2014	Cerro Tololo-DECam	DECam	·	3.0 km	MPC · JPL
800612	2014 HH_{152}	—	May 14, 2009	Mount Lemmon	Mount Lemmon Survey	EOS	1.4 km	MPC · JPL
800613	2014 HC_{157}	—	April 24, 2014	Cerro Tololo-DECam	DECam	·	2.0 km	MPC · JPL
800614	2014 HA_{162}	—	March 28, 2014	Kitt Peak	Spacewatch	·	2.1 km	MPC · JPL
800615	2014 HY_{165}	—	April 24, 2006	Kitt Peak	Spacewatch	EUN	850 m	MPC · JPL
800616	2014 HM_{166}	—	February 28, 2014	Haleakala	Pan-STARRS 1	T_{j} (2.98)	2.2 km	MPC · JPL
800617	2014 HG_{172}	—	April 29, 2014	Haleakala	Pan-STARRS 1	·	2.2 km	MPC · JPL
800618	2014 HH_{177}	—	February 26, 2014	Haleakala	Pan-STARRS 1	T_{j} (2.9)	1.7 km	MPC · JPL
800619	2014 HV_{180}	—	April 9, 2014	Kitt Peak	Spacewatch	T_{j} (2.98)	2.1 km	MPC · JPL
800620	2014 HG_{190}	—	April 30, 2014	Haleakala	Pan-STARRS 1	·	2.0 km	MPC · JPL
800621	2014 HE_{191}	—	April 24, 2014	Haleakala	Pan-STARRS 1	·	3.0 km	MPC · JPL
800622	2014 HD_{201}	—	April 24, 2014	Haleakala	Pan-STARRS 1	·	2.4 km	MPC · JPL
800623	2014 HJ_{201}	—	September 5, 2010	Mount Lemmon	Mount Lemmon Survey	T_{j} (2.99)	2.9 km	MPC · JPL
800624	2014 HN_{201}	—	April 29, 2014	Haleakala	Pan-STARRS 1	DOR	1.6 km	MPC · JPL
800625	2014 HQ_{201}	—	April 30, 2014	Haleakala	Pan-STARRS 1	LIX	2.7 km	MPC · JPL
800626	2014 HK_{204}	—	April 21, 2014	Mount Lemmon	Mount Lemmon Survey	·	2.1 km	MPC · JPL
800627	2014 HE_{205}	—	April 24, 2014	Haleakala	Pan-STARRS 1	·	1.4 km	MPC · JPL
800628	2014 HU_{205}	—	April 4, 2014	Kitt Peak	Spacewatch	·	1.7 km	MPC · JPL
800629	2014 HK_{207}	—	April 30, 2014	Haleakala	Pan-STARRS 1	·	3.0 km	MPC · JPL
800630	2014 HS_{207}	—	April 30, 2014	Haleakala	Pan-STARRS 1	THB	1.7 km	MPC · JPL
800631	2014 HA_{212}	—	April 29, 2014	Haleakala	Pan-STARRS 1	TIR	1.8 km	MPC · JPL
800632	2014 HF_{212}	—	April 21, 2014	Mount Lemmon	Mount Lemmon Survey	·	2.0 km	MPC · JPL
800633	2014 HM_{213}	—	August 7, 2015	Haleakala	Pan-STARRS 1	·	2.5 km	MPC · JPL
800634	2014 HL_{218}	—	April 30, 2014	Haleakala	Pan-STARRS 1	·	2.0 km	MPC · JPL
800635	2014 HQ_{218}	—	April 28, 2014	Haleakala	Pan-STARRS 1	·	1.9 km	MPC · JPL
800636	2014 HV_{218}	—	April 30, 2014	Haleakala	Pan-STARRS 1	LIX	2.9 km	MPC · JPL
800637	2014 HW_{219}	—	April 30, 2014	Haleakala	Pan-STARRS 1	T_{j} (2.99) · EUP	1.8 km	MPC · JPL
800638	2014 HA_{220}	—	April 29, 2014	Haleakala	Pan-STARRS 1	·	1.2 km	MPC · JPL
800639	2014 HB_{220}	—	April 20, 2014	Mount Lemmon	Mount Lemmon Survey	·	1.8 km	MPC · JPL
800640	2014 HV_{221}	—	April 30, 2014	Haleakala	Pan-STARRS 1	·	2.3 km	MPC · JPL
800641	2014 HF_{222}	—	April 30, 2014	Haleakala	Pan-STARRS 1	T_{j} (2.99)	2.2 km	MPC · JPL
800642	2014 HO_{222}	—	April 28, 2014	Mount Lemmon	Mount Lemmon Survey	·	2.0 km	MPC · JPL
800643	2014 HS_{222}	—	April 29, 2014	Haleakala	Pan-STARRS 1	·	2.2 km	MPC · JPL
800644	2014 HD_{223}	—	April 29, 2014	Haleakala	Pan-STARRS 1	VER	2.0 km	MPC · JPL
800645	2014 HJ_{223}	—	April 23, 2014	Mount Lemmon	Mount Lemmon Survey	T_{j} (2.99)	1.9 km	MPC · JPL
800646	2014 HK_{223}	—	April 30, 2014	Mount Lemmon	Mount Lemmon Survey	·	2.0 km	MPC · JPL
800647	2014 HX_{223}	—	April 20, 2014	Kitt Peak	Spacewatch	·	2.0 km	MPC · JPL
800648	2014 HY_{223}	—	April 29, 2014	Haleakala	Pan-STARRS 1	·	2.3 km	MPC · JPL
800649	2014 HX_{224}	—	April 24, 2014	Mount Lemmon	Mount Lemmon Survey	·	2.0 km	MPC · JPL
800650	2014 HB_{225}	—	April 29, 2014	Haleakala	Pan-STARRS 1	T_{j} (2.98)	2.4 km	MPC · JPL
800651	2014 HP_{225}	—	April 24, 2014	Mount Lemmon	Mount Lemmon Survey	·	2.4 km	MPC · JPL
800652	2014 HV_{226}	—	April 29, 2014	Haleakala	Pan-STARRS 1	·	1.3 km	MPC · JPL
800653	2014 HO_{227}	—	April 24, 2014	Mount Lemmon	Mount Lemmon Survey	·	2.0 km	MPC · JPL
800654	2014 HT_{229}	—	April 29, 2014	Haleakala	Pan-STARRS 1	·	2.2 km	MPC · JPL
800655	2014 HC_{230}	—	April 21, 2014	Kitt Peak	Spacewatch	·	1.0 km	MPC · JPL
800656	2014 HW_{230}	—	April 24, 2014	Mount Lemmon	Mount Lemmon Survey	T_{j} (2.91)	2.6 km	MPC · JPL
800657	2014 HC_{231}	—	April 24, 2014	Mount Lemmon	Mount Lemmon Survey	·	1.1 km	MPC · JPL
800658	2014 HD_{231}	—	April 20, 2014	Mount Lemmon	Mount Lemmon Survey	TIR	2.1 km	MPC · JPL
800659	2014 HD_{234}	—	April 24, 2014	Mount Lemmon	Mount Lemmon Survey	·	2.1 km	MPC · JPL
800660	2014 HJ_{234}	—	April 30, 2014	Mount Lemmon	Mount Lemmon Survey	TIR	2.2 km	MPC · JPL
800661	2014 HL_{234}	—	April 30, 2014	Haleakala	Pan-STARRS 1	·	2.2 km	MPC · JPL
800662	2014 HM_{234}	—	April 24, 2014	Mount Lemmon	Mount Lemmon Survey	·	2.3 km	MPC · JPL
800663	2014 HN_{234}	—	April 24, 2014	Haleakala	Pan-STARRS 1	·	2.0 km	MPC · JPL
800664	2014 HZ_{235}	—	April 23, 2014	Haleakala	Pan-STARRS 1	·	910 m	MPC · JPL
800665	2014 HS_{236}	—	April 29, 2014	Haleakala	Pan-STARRS 1	·	1.1 km	MPC · JPL
800666	2014 HQ_{239}	—	May 23, 2014	Haleakala	Pan-STARRS 1	·	1.6 km	MPC · JPL
800667	2014 HT_{239}	—	May 23, 2014	Haleakala	Pan-STARRS 1	·	2.4 km	MPC · JPL
800668	2014 HA_{241}	—	November 2, 2011	Mount Lemmon	Mount Lemmon Survey	·	2.7 km	MPC · JPL
800669	2014 HK_{241}	—	April 28, 2014	Cerro Tololo	DECam	·	2.3 km	MPC · JPL
800670	2014 HB_{243}	—	October 25, 2016	Haleakala	Pan-STARRS 1	·	1.9 km	MPC · JPL
800671	2014 HF_{243}	—	April 29, 2014	Cerro Tololo	DECam	·	1.5 km	MPC · JPL
800672	2014 HR_{244}	—	April 28, 2014	Cerro Tololo	DECam	·	1.9 km	MPC · JPL
800673	2014 HA_{246}	—	November 17, 2015	Cerro Paranal	Gaia Ground Based Optical Tracking	NYS	710 m	MPC · JPL
800674	2014 HF_{247}	—	April 23, 2014	Haleakala	Pan-STARRS 1	THB	1.7 km	MPC · JPL
800675	2014 HR_{249}	—	April 23, 2014	Cerro Tololo	DECam	·	1.8 km	MPC · JPL
800676	2014 HM_{253}	—	April 23, 2014	Cerro Tololo	DECam	·	2.2 km	MPC · JPL
800677	2014 HZ_{256}	—	April 23, 2014	Cerro Tololo	DECam	AGN	780 m	MPC · JPL
800678	2014 HQ_{261}	—	April 28, 2014	Cerro Tololo	DECam	·	2.5 km	MPC · JPL
800679	2014 HM_{262}	—	April 23, 2014	Cerro Tololo	DECam	·	1.6 km	MPC · JPL
800680	2014 HN_{265}	—	April 28, 2014	Cerro Tololo	DECam	·	2.0 km	MPC · JPL
800681	2014 HM_{266}	—	April 28, 2014	Cerro Tololo	DECam	·	2.3 km	MPC · JPL
800682	2014 HW_{271}	—	April 21, 2014	Mount Lemmon	Mount Lemmon Survey	·	1.9 km	MPC · JPL
800683	2014 HK_{274}	—	April 30, 2009	Kitt Peak	Spacewatch	·	1.3 km	MPC · JPL
800684	2014 HW_{274}	—	April 21, 2014	Mount Lemmon	Mount Lemmon Survey	·	2.0 km	MPC · JPL
800685	2014 HY_{274}	—	April 29, 2014	Haleakala	Pan-STARRS 1	·	1.9 km	MPC · JPL
800686	2014 HX_{283}	—	April 23, 2014	Cerro Tololo	DECam	·	1.7 km	MPC · JPL
800687	2014 HU_{284}	—	November 2, 2011	Mount Lemmon	Mount Lemmon Survey	·	2.1 km	MPC · JPL
800688	2014 HZ_{288}	—	August 13, 2004	Cerro Tololo	Deep Ecliptic Survey	THM	1.5 km	MPC · JPL
800689	2014 HQ_{293}	—	April 30, 2014	Haleakala	Pan-STARRS 1	BRA	950 m	MPC · JPL
800690	2014 HP_{296}	—	April 23, 2014	Cerro Tololo	DECam	·	1.6 km	MPC · JPL
800691	2014 HV_{296}	—	April 28, 2014	Cerro Tololo	DECam	·	2.2 km	MPC · JPL
800692	2014 HQ_{301}	—	April 28, 2014	Cerro Tololo	DECam	TIR	1.6 km	MPC · JPL
800693	2014 HV_{301}	—	April 23, 2014	Cerro Tololo	DECam	·	2.0 km	MPC · JPL
800694	2014 HK_{302}	—	April 23, 2014	Cerro Tololo	DECam	·	2.2 km	MPC · JPL
800695	2014 HV_{302}	—	April 25, 2014	Cerro Tololo-DECam	DECam	·	2.2 km	MPC · JPL
800696	2014 HF_{303}	—	April 28, 2014	Cerro Tololo	DECam	·	2.3 km	MPC · JPL
800697	2014 HN_{303}	—	April 23, 2014	Cerro Tololo	DECam	URS	2.1 km	MPC · JPL
800698	2014 HT_{303}	—	April 23, 2014	Cerro Tololo	DECam	·	1.9 km	MPC · JPL
800699	2014 HQ_{304}	—	April 29, 2014	Haleakala	Pan-STARRS 1	·	2.0 km	MPC · JPL
800700	2014 HV_{305}	—	April 29, 2014	Haleakala	Pan-STARRS 1	·	2.4 km	MPC · JPL

== 800701–800800 ==
back to top

Designation			Discovery			Properties		Ref
Permanent	Provisional	Named after	Date	Site	Discoverer(s)	Category	Diam.	Ref
800701	2014 HR_{307}	—	April 23, 2014	Cerro Tololo	DECam	HYG	1.9 km	MPC · JPL
800702	2014 HA_{309}	—	September 11, 2016	Mount Lemmon	Mount Lemmon Survey	LIX	2.4 km	MPC · JPL
800703	2014 HY_{309}	—	April 24, 2014	Cerro Tololo	DECam	EOS	1.3 km	MPC · JPL
800704	2014 HD_{311}	—	April 23, 2014	Cerro Tololo	DECam	EOS	1.1 km	MPC · JPL
800705	2014 HB_{312}	—	September 23, 2011	Haleakala	Pan-STARRS 1	·	2.2 km	MPC · JPL
800706	2014 HL_{312}	—	April 28, 2014	Cerro Tololo	DECam	·	2.3 km	MPC · JPL
800707	2014 HV_{314}	—	April 23, 2014	Cerro Tololo	DECam	·	980 m	MPC · JPL
800708	2014 HU_{319}	—	August 20, 2015	Kitt Peak	Spacewatch	LIX	2.7 km	MPC · JPL
800709	2014 HW_{319}	—	October 4, 2016	Mount Lemmon	Mount Lemmon Survey	·	2.1 km	MPC · JPL
800710	2014 HU_{327}	—	October 22, 2011	Mount Lemmon	Mount Lemmon Survey	·	1.9 km	MPC · JPL
800711	2014 HE_{328}	—	April 23, 2014	Cerro Tololo	DECam	·	1.6 km	MPC · JPL
800712	2014 HM_{331}	—	April 27, 2014	Cerro Tololo	DECam	LIX	2.0 km	MPC · JPL
800713	2014 HY_{337}	—	April 28, 2014	Cerro Tololo	DECam	·	1.4 km	MPC · JPL
800714	2014 HL_{338}	—	April 28, 2014	Cerro Tololo	DECam	T_{j} (2.99)	2.2 km	MPC · JPL
800715	2014 HD_{345}	—	April 23, 2014	Cerro Tololo	DECam	VER	1.6 km	MPC · JPL
800716	2014 HG_{354}	—	April 23, 2014	Cerro Tololo	DECam	L4	5.2 km	MPC · JPL
800717	2014 HC_{356}	—	April 23, 2014	Cerro Tololo	DECam	·	1.9 km	MPC · JPL
800718	2014 HG_{356}	—	April 23, 2014	Cerro Tololo	DECam	·	1.7 km	MPC · JPL
800719	2014 HW_{357}	—	April 30, 2014	Haleakala	Pan-STARRS 1	·	2.4 km	MPC · JPL
800720	2014 HN_{358}	—	April 23, 2014	Cerro Tololo	DECam	·	1.9 km	MPC · JPL
800721	2014 HX_{361}	—	April 21, 2014	Mount Lemmon	Mount Lemmon Survey	·	1.9 km	MPC · JPL
800722	2014 HN_{528}	—	April 23, 2014	Cerro Tololo	DECam	·	1.3 km	MPC · JPL
800723	2014 HY_{528}	—	April 25, 2014	Cerro Tololo-DECam	DECam	·	1.5 km	MPC · JPL
800724	2014 JT	—	April 25, 2014	Mount Lemmon	Mount Lemmon Survey	·	2.7 km	MPC · JPL
800725	2014 JB_{1}	—	May 1, 2014	Mount Lemmon	Mount Lemmon Survey	·	2.8 km	MPC · JPL
800726	2014 JJ_{1}	—	April 5, 2014	Haleakala	Pan-STARRS 1	THM	1.8 km	MPC · JPL
800727	2014 JK_{2}	—	September 8, 2011	Kitt Peak	Spacewatch	MAS	590 m	MPC · JPL
800728	2014 JY_{4}	—	May 1, 2014	Mount Lemmon	Mount Lemmon Survey	·	2.5 km	MPC · JPL
800729	2014 JL_{9}	—	May 3, 2014	Mount Lemmon	Mount Lemmon Survey	·	780 m	MPC · JPL
800730	2014 JW_{9}	—	May 3, 2014	Mount Lemmon	Mount Lemmon Survey	·	2.1 km	MPC · JPL
800731	2014 JT_{11}	—	May 3, 2014	Mount Lemmon	Mount Lemmon Survey	·	2.0 km	MPC · JPL
800732	2014 JQ_{12}	—	September 21, 2011	Haleakala	Pan-STARRS 1	·	1 km	MPC · JPL
800733	2014 JB_{16}	—	April 24, 2014	Haleakala	Pan-STARRS 1	·	2.0 km	MPC · JPL
800734	2014 JG_{22}	—	April 14, 2008	Mount Lemmon	Mount Lemmon Survey	THB	1.8 km	MPC · JPL
800735	2014 JL_{29}	—	April 28, 2014	Haleakala	Pan-STARRS 1	·	2.3 km	MPC · JPL
800736	2014 JF_{30}	—	October 12, 2010	Mount Lemmon	Mount Lemmon Survey	·	2.6 km	MPC · JPL
800737	2014 JX_{30}	—	April 29, 2014	ESA OGS	ESA OGS	H	450 m	MPC · JPL
800738	2014 JN_{32}	—	May 3, 2014	Mount Lemmon	Mount Lemmon Survey	PHO	720 m	MPC · JPL
800739	2014 JD_{44}	—	April 7, 2014	Kitt Peak	Spacewatch	3:2	4.2 km	MPC · JPL
800740	2014 JA_{47}	—	May 6, 2014	Haleakala	Pan-STARRS 1	·	890 m	MPC · JPL
800741	2014 JW_{47}	—	May 6, 2014	Haleakala	Pan-STARRS 1	LIX	2.7 km	MPC · JPL
800742	2014 JR_{50}	—	April 20, 2014	Mount Lemmon	Mount Lemmon Survey	THB	2.3 km	MPC · JPL
800743	2014 JP_{52}	—	July 20, 2004	Siding Spring	SSS	·	2.4 km	MPC · JPL
800744	2014 JZ_{60}	—	May 6, 2014	Mount Lemmon	Mount Lemmon Survey	·	1.9 km	MPC · JPL
800745	2014 JY_{61}	—	April 28, 2014	Haleakala	Pan-STARRS 1	·	2.2 km	MPC · JPL
800746	2014 JD_{63}	—	April 8, 2014	Haleakala	Pan-STARRS 1	PHO	820 m	MPC · JPL
800747	2014 JE_{65}	—	May 3, 2014	Mount Lemmon	Mount Lemmon Survey	·	1.8 km	MPC · JPL
800748	2014 JH_{65}	—	April 25, 2003	Kitt Peak	Spacewatch	·	2.0 km	MPC · JPL
800749	2014 JG_{66}	—	November 6, 2010	Mount Lemmon	Mount Lemmon Survey	LIX	2.9 km	MPC · JPL
800750	2014 JH_{67}	—	April 25, 2014	Mount Lemmon	Mount Lemmon Survey	·	1.1 km	MPC · JPL
800751	2014 JK_{71}	—	May 8, 2014	Haleakala	Pan-STARRS 1	·	3.3 km	MPC · JPL
800752	2014 JL_{71}	—	February 3, 2013	Haleakala	Pan-STARRS 1	·	2.5 km	MPC · JPL
800753	2014 JC_{77}	—	May 8, 2014	Haleakala	Pan-STARRS 1	·	2.4 km	MPC · JPL
800754	2014 JF_{77}	—	May 9, 2014	Kitt Peak	Spacewatch	THM	1.7 km	MPC · JPL
800755	2014 JM_{77}	—	April 21, 2014	Kitt Peak	Spacewatch	TIR	2.2 km	MPC · JPL
800756	2014 JF_{81}	—	May 10, 2014	Haleakala	Pan-STARRS 1	H	530 m	MPC · JPL
800757	2014 JA_{82}	—	April 25, 2014	Mount Lemmon	Mount Lemmon Survey	·	2.5 km	MPC · JPL
800758	2014 JY_{82}	—	May 6, 2014	Haleakala	Pan-STARRS 1	·	2.2 km	MPC · JPL
800759	2014 JD_{83}	—	May 6, 2014	Haleakala	Pan-STARRS 1	·	2.1 km	MPC · JPL
800760	2014 JO_{83}	—	May 9, 2014	Haleakala	Pan-STARRS 1	·	1.9 km	MPC · JPL
800761	2014 JR_{83}	—	February 4, 2009	Mount Lemmon	Mount Lemmon Survey	·	1.2 km	MPC · JPL
800762	2014 JO_{85}	—	May 4, 2014	Mount Lemmon	Mount Lemmon Survey	THM	1.8 km	MPC · JPL
800763	2014 JT_{86}	—	May 8, 2014	Haleakala	Pan-STARRS 1	·	930 m	MPC · JPL
800764	2014 JW_{87}	—	May 3, 2014	Kitt Peak	Spacewatch	·	2.1 km	MPC · JPL
800765	2014 JP_{89}	—	October 14, 2010	Mount Lemmon	Mount Lemmon Survey	·	2.4 km	MPC · JPL
800766	2014 JY_{90}	—	May 9, 2014	Kitt Peak	Spacewatch	·	870 m	MPC · JPL
800767	2014 JG_{91}	—	April 28, 2014	Haleakala	Pan-STARRS 1	T_{j} (2.98)	2.7 km	MPC · JPL
800768	2014 JQ_{92}	—	May 9, 2014	Haleakala	Pan-STARRS 1	plutino	103 km	MPC · JPL
800769	2014 JL_{93}	—	May 5, 2014	Mount Lemmon	Mount Lemmon Survey	·	2.0 km	MPC · JPL
800770	2014 JO_{94}	—	May 6, 2014	Haleakala	Pan-STARRS 1	(895)	2.7 km	MPC · JPL
800771	2014 JX_{95}	—	May 5, 2014	Kitt Peak	Spacewatch	·	2.5 km	MPC · JPL
800772	2014 JY_{96}	—	May 7, 2014	Haleakala	Pan-STARRS 1	·	2.5 km	MPC · JPL
800773	2014 JN_{97}	—	May 4, 2014	Haleakala	Pan-STARRS 1	·	1.8 km	MPC · JPL
800774	2014 JG_{98}	—	September 4, 2007	Mount Lemmon	Mount Lemmon Survey	MAS	660 m	MPC · JPL
800775	2014 JA_{99}	—	May 7, 2014	Haleakala	Pan-STARRS 1	·	2.1 km	MPC · JPL
800776	2014 JV_{99}	—	May 7, 2014	Haleakala	Pan-STARRS 1	·	880 m	MPC · JPL
800777	2014 JB_{100}	—	May 6, 2014	Mount Lemmon	Mount Lemmon Survey	MAR	780 m	MPC · JPL
800778	2014 JJ_{100}	—	May 8, 2014	Haleakala	Pan-STARRS 1	T_{j} (2.96)	2.5 km	MPC · JPL
800779	2014 JJ_{101}	—	May 7, 2014	Haleakala	Pan-STARRS 1	·	1.4 km	MPC · JPL
800780	2014 JR_{101}	—	May 7, 2014	Haleakala	Pan-STARRS 1	TIR	1.9 km	MPC · JPL
800781	2014 JK_{102}	—	May 6, 2014	Haleakala	Pan-STARRS 1	·	2.1 km	MPC · JPL
800782	2014 JF_{103}	—	May 8, 2014	Haleakala	Pan-STARRS 1	(69559)	2.0 km	MPC · JPL
800783	2014 JL_{105}	—	May 2, 2014	Mount Lemmon	Mount Lemmon Survey	TIR	1.5 km	MPC · JPL
800784	2014 JJ_{106}	—	May 7, 2014	Haleakala	Pan-STARRS 1	·	1.7 km	MPC · JPL
800785	2014 JR_{106}	—	May 2, 2014	Kitt Peak	Spacewatch	·	1.9 km	MPC · JPL
800786	2014 JT_{106}	—	May 3, 2014	Mount Lemmon	Mount Lemmon Survey	·	650 m	MPC · JPL
800787	2014 JR_{107}	—	May 3, 2014	Mount Lemmon	Mount Lemmon Survey	NEM	1.5 km	MPC · JPL
800788	2014 JZ_{107}	—	May 7, 2014	Haleakala	Pan-STARRS 1	EOS	1.5 km	MPC · JPL
800789	2014 JY_{108}	—	May 6, 2014	Haleakala	Pan-STARRS 1	·	2.3 km	MPC · JPL
800790	2014 JZ_{108}	—	May 5, 2014	Haleakala	Pan-STARRS 1	·	1.9 km	MPC · JPL
800791	2014 JB_{109}	—	May 2, 2014	Mount Lemmon	Mount Lemmon Survey	·	2.2 km	MPC · JPL
800792	2014 JV_{109}	—	May 7, 2014	Haleakala	Pan-STARRS 1	·	2.1 km	MPC · JPL
800793	2014 JZ_{109}	—	May 8, 2014	Haleakala	Pan-STARRS 1	·	1.9 km	MPC · JPL
800794	2014 JB_{110}	—	May 8, 2014	Haleakala	Pan-STARRS 1	TIR	1.9 km	MPC · JPL
800795	2014 JS_{112}	—	May 10, 2014	Haleakala	Pan-STARRS 1	T_{j} (2.96)	2.7 km	MPC · JPL
800796	2014 JA_{113}	—	May 8, 2014	Haleakala	Pan-STARRS 1	·	1.6 km	MPC · JPL
800797	2014 JE_{113}	—	May 8, 2014	Haleakala	Pan-STARRS 1	HOF	1.7 km	MPC · JPL
800798	2014 JG_{114}	—	May 7, 2014	Haleakala	Pan-STARRS 1	(43176)	2.2 km	MPC · JPL
800799	2014 JJ_{117}	—	May 4, 2014	Haleakala	Pan-STARRS 1	T_{j} (2.98)	1.7 km	MPC · JPL
800800	2014 JV_{117}	—	May 9, 2014	Haleakala	Pan-STARRS 1	·	2.6 km	MPC · JPL

== 800801–800900 ==
back to top

Designation			Discovery			Properties		Ref
Permanent	Provisional	Named after	Date	Site	Discoverer(s)	Category	Diam.	Ref
800801	2014 JV_{118}	—	May 7, 2014	Haleakala	Pan-STARRS 1	TIR	1.8 km	MPC · JPL
800802	2014 JX_{120}	—	May 4, 2014	Mount Lemmon	Mount Lemmon Survey	·	2.5 km	MPC · JPL
800803	2014 JE_{122}	—	May 6, 2014	Haleakala	Pan-STARRS 1	·	2.2 km	MPC · JPL
800804	2014 JC_{123}	—	May 3, 2014	Mount Lemmon	Mount Lemmon Survey	·	2.5 km	MPC · JPL
800805	2014 JA_{124}	—	May 7, 2014	Haleakala	Pan-STARRS 1	·	1.7 km	MPC · JPL
800806	2014 JG_{124}	—	May 7, 2014	Haleakala	Pan-STARRS 1	·	1.7 km	MPC · JPL
800807	2014 JW_{125}	—	May 4, 2014	Haleakala	Pan-STARRS 1	VER	2.1 km	MPC · JPL
800808	2014 JY_{125}	—	May 7, 2014	Haleakala	Pan-STARRS 1	·	2.3 km	MPC · JPL
800809	2014 JD_{126}	—	May 2, 2014	Mount Lemmon	Mount Lemmon Survey	·	2.0 km	MPC · JPL
800810	2014 JQ_{127}	—	May 2, 2014	Mount Lemmon	Mount Lemmon Survey	·	2.2 km	MPC · JPL
800811	2014 JS_{127}	—	May 7, 2014	Haleakala	Pan-STARRS 1	·	1.9 km	MPC · JPL
800812	2014 JT_{127}	—	May 7, 2014	Haleakala	Pan-STARRS 1	·	2.2 km	MPC · JPL
800813	2014 JZ_{127}	—	May 6, 2014	Mount Lemmon	Mount Lemmon Survey	THB	1.8 km	MPC · JPL
800814	2014 JC_{128}	—	May 7, 2014	Haleakala	Pan-STARRS 1	·	1.5 km	MPC · JPL
800815	2014 JE_{128}	—	May 4, 2014	Haleakala	Pan-STARRS 1	·	2.0 km	MPC · JPL
800816	2014 JK_{128}	—	May 9, 2014	Haleakala	Pan-STARRS 1	MAR	850 m	MPC · JPL
800817	2014 JG_{129}	—	May 8, 2014	Haleakala	Pan-STARRS 1	·	2.4 km	MPC · JPL
800818	2014 JQ_{130}	—	May 9, 2014	Haleakala	Pan-STARRS 1	·	1.8 km	MPC · JPL
800819	2014 JT_{130}	—	May 8, 2014	Haleakala	Pan-STARRS 1	·	1.2 km	MPC · JPL
800820	2014 JW_{130}	—	May 2, 2014	Mount Lemmon	Mount Lemmon Survey	·	1.9 km	MPC · JPL
800821	2014 JW_{132}	—	May 8, 2014	Haleakala	Pan-STARRS 1	THB	1.7 km	MPC · JPL
800822	2014 JV_{134}	—	May 6, 2014	Haleakala	Pan-STARRS 1	·	2.1 km	MPC · JPL
800823	2014 JY_{140}	—	May 8, 2014	Haleakala	Pan-STARRS 1	·	2.4 km	MPC · JPL
800824	2014 JC_{145}	—	May 7, 2014	Haleakala	Pan-STARRS 1	·	1.3 km	MPC · JPL
800825	2014 JD_{147}	—	May 7, 2014	Haleakala	Pan-STARRS 1	EOS	1.3 km	MPC · JPL
800826	2014 JF_{147}	—	May 8, 2014	Haleakala	Pan-STARRS 1	·	2.0 km	MPC · JPL
800827	2014 JT_{147}	—	May 7, 2014	Haleakala	Pan-STARRS 1	·	2.1 km	MPC · JPL
800828	2014 JM_{153}	—	May 8, 2014	Haleakala	Pan-STARRS 1	·	1.1 km	MPC · JPL
800829	2014 KX_{2}	—	April 30, 2014	Haleakala	Pan-STARRS 1	·	1.6 km	MPC · JPL
800830	2014 KQ_{7}	—	April 5, 2014	Haleakala	Pan-STARRS 1	·	760 m	MPC · JPL
800831	2014 KS_{9}	—	May 8, 2014	Haleakala	Pan-STARRS 1	·	1.1 km	MPC · JPL
800832	2014 KJ_{15}	—	February 28, 2014	Haleakala	Pan-STARRS 1	·	1.1 km	MPC · JPL
800833	2014 KX_{15}	—	May 4, 2014	Mount Lemmon	Mount Lemmon Survey	·	2.7 km	MPC · JPL
800834	2014 KU_{18}	—	October 28, 2010	Mount Lemmon	Mount Lemmon Survey	·	2.4 km	MPC · JPL
800835	2014 KD_{24}	—	April 5, 2014	Haleakala	Pan-STARRS 1	·	1.8 km	MPC · JPL
800836	2014 KA_{25}	—	May 4, 2014	Haleakala	Pan-STARRS 1	·	2.8 km	MPC · JPL
800837	2014 KF_{28}	—	March 28, 2014	Mount Lemmon	Mount Lemmon Survey	·	1.1 km	MPC · JPL
800838	2014 KV_{30}	—	April 25, 2014	Mount Lemmon	Mount Lemmon Survey	LIX	2.7 km	MPC · JPL
800839	2014 KN_{31}	—	May 4, 2014	Haleakala	Pan-STARRS 1	LIX	2.5 km	MPC · JPL
800840	2014 KK_{32}	—	May 7, 2014	Haleakala	Pan-STARRS 1	VER	2.1 km	MPC · JPL
800841	2014 KT_{32}	—	September 10, 2007	Kitt Peak	Spacewatch	·	1.1 km	MPC · JPL
800842	2014 KO_{35}	—	May 4, 2014	Mount Lemmon	Mount Lemmon Survey	·	2.1 km	MPC · JPL
800843	2014 KP_{36}	—	March 26, 2014	Mount Lemmon	Mount Lemmon Survey	THB	2.3 km	MPC · JPL
800844	2014 KL_{38}	—	April 6, 2014	Mount Lemmon	Mount Lemmon Survey	THB	2.2 km	MPC · JPL
800845	2014 KG_{40}	—	May 21, 2014	Haleakala	Pan-STARRS 1	·	1.1 km	MPC · JPL
800846	2014 KR_{47}	—	July 17, 2004	Cerro Tololo	Deep Ecliptic Survey	THM	1.6 km	MPC · JPL
800847	2014 KX_{47}	—	May 2, 2014	Mount Lemmon	Mount Lemmon Survey	THM	1.6 km	MPC · JPL
800848	2014 KC_{51}	—	May 21, 2014	Haleakala	Pan-STARRS 1	PHO	740 m	MPC · JPL
800849	2014 KO_{51}	—	April 22, 2014	Mount Lemmon	Mount Lemmon Survey	·	2.7 km	MPC · JPL
800850	2014 KH_{52}	—	May 4, 2014	Mount Lemmon	Mount Lemmon Survey	·	1.0 km	MPC · JPL
800851	2014 KO_{52}	—	May 7, 2014	Haleakala	Pan-STARRS 1	·	2.1 km	MPC · JPL
800852	2014 KG_{53}	—	May 4, 2014	Mount Lemmon	Mount Lemmon Survey	T_{j} (2.99)	2.8 km	MPC · JPL
800853	2014 KU_{54}	—	May 7, 2014	Haleakala	Pan-STARRS 1	TIR	2.1 km	MPC · JPL
800854	2014 KF_{55}	—	May 3, 2014	Mount Lemmon	Mount Lemmon Survey	URS	2.5 km	MPC · JPL
800855	2014 KT_{55}	—	May 24, 2014	Kitt Peak	Spacewatch	·	2.7 km	MPC · JPL
800856	2014 KK_{56}	—	May 7, 2014	Haleakala	Pan-STARRS 1	·	2.7 km	MPC · JPL
800857	2014 KJ_{57}	—	March 18, 2010	Kitt Peak	Spacewatch	·	910 m	MPC · JPL
800858	2014 KX_{60}	—	May 24, 2014	Haleakala	Pan-STARRS 1	·	2.6 km	MPC · JPL
800859	2014 KP_{61}	—	April 7, 2008	Kitt Peak	Spacewatch	·	3.0 km	MPC · JPL
800860	2014 KE_{63}	—	February 17, 2013	Mount Lemmon	Mount Lemmon Survey	·	2.4 km	MPC · JPL
800861	2014 KS_{63}	—	May 21, 2014	Haleakala	Pan-STARRS 1	·	2.5 km	MPC · JPL
800862	2014 KK_{68}	—	April 25, 2008	Kitt Peak	Spacewatch	·	2.3 km	MPC · JPL
800863	2014 KP_{68}	—	May 4, 2014	Kitt Peak	Spacewatch	·	1.7 km	MPC · JPL
800864	2014 KW_{68}	—	May 23, 2014	Haleakala	Pan-STARRS 1	·	2.2 km	MPC · JPL
800865	2014 KF_{70}	—	May 7, 2014	Haleakala	Pan-STARRS 1	·	2.0 km	MPC · JPL
800866	2014 KK_{70}	—	May 24, 2014	Mount Lemmon	Mount Lemmon Survey	·	2.0 km	MPC · JPL
800867	2014 KG_{77}	—	May 7, 2014	Haleakala	Pan-STARRS 1	·	840 m	MPC · JPL
800868	2014 KJ_{81}	—	May 21, 2014	Haleakala	Pan-STARRS 1	EUP	2.6 km	MPC · JPL
800869	2014 KV_{81}	—	May 24, 2006	Kitt Peak	Spacewatch	H	450 m	MPC · JPL
800870	2014 KD_{82}	—	May 28, 2014	Mount Lemmon	Mount Lemmon Survey	·	2.3 km	MPC · JPL
800871	2014 KW_{88}	—	May 7, 2014	Haleakala	Pan-STARRS 1	·	1.9 km	MPC · JPL
800872	2014 KY_{88}	—	May 9, 2014	Haleakala	Pan-STARRS 1	·	1.8 km	MPC · JPL
800873	2014 KZ_{88}	—	May 21, 2014	Haleakala	Pan-STARRS 1	T_{j} (2.99) · EUP	2.0 km	MPC · JPL
800874	2014 KU_{96}	—	February 13, 2013	Haleakala	Pan-STARRS 1	·	2.3 km	MPC · JPL
800875	2014 KN_{99}	—	February 28, 2014	Haleakala	Pan-STARRS 1	·	1.0 km	MPC · JPL
800876	2014 KY_{100}	—	May 28, 2014	Haleakala	Pan-STARRS 1	·	1.4 km	MPC · JPL
800877	2014 KS_{103}	—	May 26, 2014	Haleakala	Pan-STARRS 1	·	1.7 km	MPC · JPL
800878	2014 KD_{106}	—	May 27, 2014	Haleakala	Pan-STARRS 1	THB	2.1 km	MPC · JPL
800879	2014 KU_{106}	—	November 2, 2010	Mount Lemmon	Mount Lemmon Survey	THM	2.0 km	MPC · JPL
800880	2014 KB_{107}	—	May 20, 2014	Haleakala	Pan-STARRS 1	·	1.5 km	MPC · JPL
800881	2014 KX_{108}	—	February 9, 2013	Haleakala	Pan-STARRS 1	·	1.8 km	MPC · JPL
800882	2014 KF_{110}	—	May 23, 2014	Haleakala	Pan-STARRS 1	TIR	2.4 km	MPC · JPL
800883	2014 KW_{110}	—	May 7, 2014	Haleakala	Pan-STARRS 1	·	2.2 km	MPC · JPL
800884	2014 KJ_{113}	—	May 21, 2014	Haleakala	Pan-STARRS 1	·	1.1 km	MPC · JPL
800885	2014 KS_{113}	—	October 7, 2016	Haleakala	Pan-STARRS 1	·	2.4 km	MPC · JPL
800886	2014 KW_{113}	—	May 27, 2014	Haleakala	Pan-STARRS 1	·	2.5 km	MPC · JPL
800887	2014 KX_{113}	—	May 28, 2014	Haleakala	Pan-STARRS 1	·	1.1 km	MPC · JPL
800888	2014 KD_{115}	—	May 23, 2014	Haleakala	Pan-STARRS 1	·	2.3 km	MPC · JPL
800889	2014 KA_{117}	—	May 27, 2014	Haleakala	Pan-STARRS 1	·	920 m	MPC · JPL
800890	2014 KL_{117}	—	May 23, 2014	Haleakala	Pan-STARRS 1	·	2.6 km	MPC · JPL
800891	2014 KA_{118}	—	October 28, 2017	Haleakala	Pan-STARRS 1	·	2.2 km	MPC · JPL
800892	2014 KJ_{118}	—	May 26, 2014	Haleakala	Pan-STARRS 1	TIR	1.9 km	MPC · JPL
800893	2014 KJ_{123}	—	May 23, 2014	Haleakala	Pan-STARRS 1	·	2.1 km	MPC · JPL
800894	2014 KV_{124}	—	May 24, 2014	Haleakala	Pan-STARRS 1	HYG	1.8 km	MPC · JPL
800895	2014 KF_{125}	—	May 27, 2014	Haleakala	Pan-STARRS 1	T_{j} (2.91)	2.0 km	MPC · JPL
800896	2014 KX_{125}	—	May 23, 2014	Haleakala	Pan-STARRS 1	·	2.5 km	MPC · JPL
800897	2014 KY_{125}	—	May 24, 2014	Haleakala	Pan-STARRS 1	·	1.8 km	MPC · JPL
800898	2014 KA_{126}	—	May 20, 2014	Haleakala	Pan-STARRS 1	THM	1.8 km	MPC · JPL
800899	2014 KF_{126}	—	May 23, 2014	Haleakala	Pan-STARRS 1	HNS	780 m	MPC · JPL
800900	2014 KH_{126}	—	May 21, 2014	Haleakala	Pan-STARRS 1	·	2.0 km	MPC · JPL

== 800901–801000 ==
back to top

Designation			Discovery			Properties		Ref
Permanent	Provisional	Named after	Date	Site	Discoverer(s)	Category	Diam.	Ref
800901	2014 KK_{126}	—	May 28, 2014	Haleakala	Pan-STARRS 1	URS	2.3 km	MPC · JPL
800902	2014 KE_{127}	—	May 21, 2014	Haleakala	Pan-STARRS 1	AGN	850 m	MPC · JPL
800903	2014 KJ_{127}	—	May 28, 2014	Mount Lemmon	Mount Lemmon Survey	·	2.1 km	MPC · JPL
800904	2014 KK_{127}	—	May 7, 2014	Haleakala	Pan-STARRS 1	TIR	1.9 km	MPC · JPL
800905	2014 KM_{127}	—	May 23, 2014	Haleakala	Pan-STARRS 1	·	1.8 km	MPC · JPL
800906	2014 KN_{127}	—	May 28, 2014	Haleakala	Pan-STARRS 1	·	2.3 km	MPC · JPL
800907	2014 KF_{128}	—	May 21, 2014	Haleakala	Pan-STARRS 1	·	1.9 km	MPC · JPL
800908	2014 KK_{128}	—	May 25, 2014	Haleakala	Pan-STARRS 1	THB	2.0 km	MPC · JPL
800909	2014 KJ_{129}	—	May 27, 2014	Haleakala	Pan-STARRS 1	·	1.2 km	MPC · JPL
800910	2014 KP_{129}	—	May 7, 2014	Haleakala	Pan-STARRS 1	·	2.3 km	MPC · JPL
800911	2014 KN_{130}	—	May 21, 2014	Haleakala	Pan-STARRS 1	·	1.5 km	MPC · JPL
800912	2014 KF_{134}	—	May 23, 2014	Haleakala	Pan-STARRS 1	·	2.2 km	MPC · JPL
800913	2014 KN_{136}	—	May 24, 2014	Haleakala	Pan-STARRS 1	·	2.1 km	MPC · JPL
800914	2014 KR_{136}	—	May 28, 2014	Haleakala	Pan-STARRS 1	·	1.2 km	MPC · JPL
800915	2014 KJ_{137}	—	May 23, 2014	Haleakala	Pan-STARRS 1	·	1.7 km	MPC · JPL
800916	2014 KL_{139}	—	May 2, 2014	Mount Lemmon	Mount Lemmon Survey	·	2.0 km	MPC · JPL
800917	2014 KC_{140}	—	May 23, 2014	Haleakala	Pan-STARRS 1	VER	2.0 km	MPC · JPL
800918	2014 KD_{140}	—	May 21, 2014	Haleakala	Pan-STARRS 1	VER	2.3 km	MPC · JPL
800919	2014 KG_{140}	—	May 23, 2014	Haleakala	Pan-STARRS 1	·	2.3 km	MPC · JPL
800920	2014 KH_{140}	—	May 7, 2014	Haleakala	Pan-STARRS 1	·	2.2 km	MPC · JPL
800921	2014 KV_{140}	—	May 23, 2014	Haleakala	Pan-STARRS 1	·	2.0 km	MPC · JPL
800922	2014 KB_{141}	—	May 22, 2014	Mount Lemmon	Mount Lemmon Survey	·	2.5 km	MPC · JPL
800923	2014 KG_{141}	—	May 24, 2014	Haleakala	Pan-STARRS 1	·	1.9 km	MPC · JPL
800924	2014 KR_{141}	—	May 23, 2014	Haleakala	Pan-STARRS 1	·	2.1 km	MPC · JPL
800925	2014 KS_{141}	—	May 23, 2014	Haleakala	Pan-STARRS 1	·	2.5 km	MPC · JPL
800926	2014 KD_{142}	—	May 20, 2014	Haleakala	Pan-STARRS 1	·	920 m	MPC · JPL
800927	2014 KZ_{142}	—	May 21, 2014	Haleakala	Pan-STARRS 1	·	1.3 km	MPC · JPL
800928	2014 KR_{143}	—	May 23, 2014	Haleakala	Pan-STARRS 1	VER	1.8 km	MPC · JPL
800929	2014 KZ_{143}	—	May 28, 2014	Haleakala	Pan-STARRS 1	·	1.5 km	MPC · JPL
800930	2014 KE_{144}	—	May 22, 2014	Haleakala	Pan-STARRS 1	AST	1.3 km	MPC · JPL
800931	2014 KQ_{146}	—	May 30, 2014	Kitt Peak	Research and Education Collaborative Occultation Network	·	1.6 km	MPC · JPL
800932	2014 KT_{147}	—	May 30, 2014	Haleakala	Pan-STARRS 1	·	2.4 km	MPC · JPL
800933	2014 KE_{148}	—	May 23, 2014	Haleakala	Pan-STARRS 1	·	2.1 km	MPC · JPL
800934	2014 KG_{157}	—	May 23, 2014	Haleakala	Pan-STARRS 1	·	2.6 km	MPC · JPL
800935	2014 KJ_{157}	—	May 21, 2014	Haleakala	Pan-STARRS 1	·	2.2 km	MPC · JPL
800936	2014 KX_{157}	—	May 23, 2014	Haleakala	Pan-STARRS 1	·	1.9 km	MPC · JPL
800937	2014 KS_{158}	—	May 27, 2014	Haleakala	Pan-STARRS 1	·	1.8 km	MPC · JPL
800938	2014 KP_{162}	—	May 23, 2014	Haleakala	Pan-STARRS 1	·	2.2 km	MPC · JPL
800939	2014 KW_{164}	—	May 26, 2014	Haleakala	Pan-STARRS 1	EUN	750 m	MPC · JPL
800940	2014 LA_{3}	—	June 2, 2014	Mount Lemmon	Mount Lemmon Survey	·	2.4 km	MPC · JPL
800941	2014 LM_{4}	—	April 25, 2014	Kitt Peak	Spacewatch	LIX	2.3 km	MPC · JPL
800942	2014 LT_{7}	—	December 12, 2012	Kitt Peak	Spacewatch	·	2.0 km	MPC · JPL
800943	2014 LE_{14}	—	May 22, 2014	Mount Lemmon	Mount Lemmon Survey	·	960 m	MPC · JPL
800944	2014 LW_{19}	—	May 7, 2014	Haleakala	Pan-STARRS 1	EUN	810 m	MPC · JPL
800945	2014 LW_{20}	—	July 8, 2010	WISE	WISE	·	1.9 km	MPC · JPL
800946	2014 LX_{23}	—	April 1, 2008	Mount Lemmon	Mount Lemmon Survey	·	1.9 km	MPC · JPL
800947	2014 LS_{29}	—	June 6, 2014	Haleakala	Pan-STARRS 1	LIX	2.7 km	MPC · JPL
800948	2014 LJ_{33}	—	June 6, 2014	Mount Lemmon	Mount Lemmon Survey	·	2.4 km	MPC · JPL
800949	2014 LU_{35}	—	June 3, 2014	Haleakala	Pan-STARRS 1	MAR	840 m	MPC · JPL
800950	2014 LN_{38}	—	June 4, 2014	Haleakala	Pan-STARRS 1	EOS	1.4 km	MPC · JPL
800951	2014 LO_{38}	—	June 4, 2014	Mount Lemmon	Mount Lemmon Survey	·	1.6 km	MPC · JPL
800952	2014 LR_{39}	—	May 7, 2014	Haleakala	Pan-STARRS 1	·	2.6 km	MPC · JPL
800953	2014 LU_{39}	—	June 4, 2014	Haleakala	Pan-STARRS 1	·	2.6 km	MPC · JPL
800954	2014 LJ_{40}	—	June 2, 2014	Haleakala	Pan-STARRS 1	EUN	790 m	MPC · JPL
800955	2014 LY_{40}	—	August 21, 2015	Haleakala	Pan-STARRS 1	·	1.9 km	MPC · JPL
800956	2014 LF_{41}	—	June 4, 2014	Haleakala	Pan-STARRS 1	·	1.1 km	MPC · JPL
800957	2014 MU_{1}	—	May 25, 2014	Haleakala	Pan-STARRS 1	T_{j} (2.97)	2.9 km	MPC · JPL
800958	2014 MV_{1}	—	May 12, 2014	Mount Lemmon	Mount Lemmon Survey	T_{j} (2.99)	2.3 km	MPC · JPL
800959	2014 MH_{10}	—	May 26, 2014	Haleakala	Pan-STARRS 1	LIX	2.4 km	MPC · JPL
800960	2014 MN_{10}	—	May 19, 2014	Haleakala	Pan-STARRS 1	TIR	2.0 km	MPC · JPL
800961	2014 ML_{11}	—	June 2, 2014	Haleakala	Pan-STARRS 1	·	2.5 km	MPC · JPL
800962	2014 MM_{28}	—	April 22, 2014	Mount Lemmon	Mount Lemmon Survey	·	2.7 km	MPC · JPL
800963	2014 MP_{28}	—	May 26, 2014	Haleakala	Pan-STARRS 1	·	2.7 km	MPC · JPL
800964	2014 MC_{32}	—	May 7, 2014	Haleakala	Pan-STARRS 1	·	1.2 km	MPC · JPL
800965	2014 MV_{35}	—	May 28, 2014	Haleakala	Pan-STARRS 1	·	2.6 km	MPC · JPL
800966	2014 MY_{38}	—	May 31, 2009	Mount Lemmon	Mount Lemmon Survey	·	2.2 km	MPC · JPL
800967	2014 MC_{43}	—	April 28, 2014	Haleakala	Pan-STARRS 1	·	2.5 km	MPC · JPL
800968	2014 MY_{46}	—	May 31, 2014	Haleakala	Pan-STARRS 1	·	2.3 km	MPC · JPL
800969	2014 MT_{47}	—	May 7, 2014	Haleakala	Pan-STARRS 1	·	1.9 km	MPC · JPL
800970	2014 MU_{54}	—	February 15, 2013	Haleakala	Pan-STARRS 1	·	900 m	MPC · JPL
800971	2014 MN_{56}	—	June 27, 2014	Haleakala	Pan-STARRS 1	·	1.0 km	MPC · JPL
800972	2014 MZ_{64}	—	June 27, 2014	Haleakala	Pan-STARRS 1	·	870 m	MPC · JPL
800973	2014 MK_{68}	—	August 14, 2006	Palomar Mountain	NEAT	·	2.9 km	MPC · JPL
800974	2014 MG_{70}	—	June 27, 2014	Haleakala	Pan-STARRS 1	cubewano (hot)	282 km	MPC · JPL
800975	2014 MA_{76}	—	June 27, 2014	Haleakala	Pan-STARRS 1	EUN	1 km	MPC · JPL
800976	2014 MZ_{76}	—	June 28, 2014	Haleakala	Pan-STARRS 1	·	1.0 km	MPC · JPL
800977	2014 MW_{77}	—	January 20, 2013	Mount Lemmon	Mount Lemmon Survey	·	860 m	MPC · JPL
800978	2014 ME_{79}	—	June 28, 2014	Haleakala	Pan-STARRS 1	·	1.1 km	MPC · JPL
800979	2014 MJ_{79}	—	June 24, 2014	Haleakala	Pan-STARRS 1	T_{j} (2.95)	2.9 km	MPC · JPL
800980	2014 MT_{84}	—	January 4, 2016	Haleakala	Pan-STARRS 1	·	890 m	MPC · JPL
800981	2014 MD_{85}	—	June 28, 2014	Haleakala	Pan-STARRS 1	·	2.4 km	MPC · JPL
800982	2014 MS_{92}	—	June 27, 2014	Haleakala	Pan-STARRS 1	·	1.0 km	MPC · JPL
800983	2014 MX_{92}	—	June 29, 2014	Haleakala	Pan-STARRS 1	·	890 m	MPC · JPL
800984	2014 MN_{95}	—	June 24, 2014	Kitt Peak	Spacewatch	·	1.1 km	MPC · JPL
800985	2014 MO_{95}	—	June 21, 2014	Haleakala	Pan-STARRS 1	·	1.1 km	MPC · JPL
800986	2014 MR_{95}	—	June 25, 2014	Mount Lemmon	Mount Lemmon Survey	3:2 · (6124)	4.5 km	MPC · JPL
800987	2014 MU_{97}	—	June 27, 2014	Haleakala	Pan-STARRS 1	·	1.5 km	MPC · JPL
800988	2014 MC_{100}	—	February 22, 2009	Kitt Peak	Spacewatch	·	1.2 km	MPC · JPL
800989	2014 MP_{100}	—	June 21, 2014	Mount Lemmon	Mount Lemmon Survey	·	2.4 km	MPC · JPL
800990	2014 MV_{100}	—	November 24, 2011	Haleakala	Pan-STARRS 1	MAR	930 m	MPC · JPL
800991	2014 ME_{101}	—	June 24, 2014	Haleakala	Pan-STARRS 1	·	1.5 km	MPC · JPL
800992	2014 MR_{101}	—	June 28, 2014	Haleakala	Pan-STARRS 1	EUN	920 m	MPC · JPL
800993	2014 MZ_{102}	—	June 30, 2014	Haleakala	Pan-STARRS 1	·	1.3 km	MPC · JPL
800994	2014 ME_{104}	—	June 30, 2014	Haleakala	Pan-STARRS 1	·	1.6 km	MPC · JPL
800995	2014 NN_{1}	—	June 5, 2014	Haleakala	Pan-STARRS 1	·	2.4 km	MPC · JPL
800996	2014 NM_{19}	—	July 2, 2014	Mount Lemmon	Mount Lemmon Survey	·	770 m	MPC · JPL
800997	2014 NN_{21}	—	May 31, 2014	Haleakala	Pan-STARRS 1	TIR	1.8 km	MPC · JPL
800998	2014 NS_{31}	—	July 2, 2014	Haleakala	Pan-STARRS 1	·	760 m	MPC · JPL
800999	2014 NA_{45}	—	July 3, 2014	Haleakala	Pan-STARRS 1	BRA	950 m	MPC · JPL
801000	2014 NP_{50}	—	January 26, 2012	Haleakala	Pan-STARRS 1	RAF	750 m	MPC · JPL

back to top

== Meaning of names ==
As minor planet discoveries are confirmed, they are given a permanent number by the IAU's Minor Planet Center (MPC), and the discoverers can then submit names for them, following the IAU's naming conventions. The list below concerns those minor planets in the specified number-range that have received names, and explains the meanings of those names.

Official naming citations of newly named small Solar System bodies are approved and published in a bulletin by IAU's Working Group for Small Bodies Nomenclature (WGSBN). Before May 2021, citations were published in MPC's Minor Planet Circulars for many decades. Recent citations can also be found on the JPL Small-Body Database (SBDB). Until his death in 2016, German astronomer Lutz D. Schmadel compiled these citations into the Dictionary of Minor Planet Names (DMP) and regularly updated the collection.

Based on Paul Herget's The Names of the Minor Planets, Schmadel also researched the unclear origin of numerous asteroids, most of which had been named prior to World War II. This article incorporates text from this source, which is in the public domain: SBDB New namings may only be added to this list below after official publication as the preannouncement of names is condemned. The WGSBN publishes a comprehensive guideline for the naming rules of non-cometary small Solar System bodies.

Named minor planet	Provisional	This minor planet was named for...	Ref · Catalog
800113 Zaharydonchev	2014 CB_{2}	Zahary Donchev, Bulgarian astronomer.	IAU · 800113
800457 Floriangoebel	2014 FC_{86}	Florian Goebel, German researcher in high-energy astronomy.	IAU · 800457
