= List of minor planets: 702001–703000 =

The following is a partial list of minor planets, running from minor-planet number 702001 through 703000, inclusive. The primary data for this and other partial lists is based on JPL's "Small-Body Orbital Elements" and data available from the Minor Planet Center. Critical list information is also provided by the MPC, unless otherwise specified from Lowell Observatory. A detailed description of the table's columns and additional sources are given on the main page including a complete list of every page in this series, and a statistical break-up on the dynamical classification of minor planets.

Also see the summary list of all named bodies in numerical and alphabetical order, and the corresponding naming citations for the number range of this particular list. New namings may only be added to this list after official publication, as the preannouncement of names is condemned by the Working Group for Small Bodies Nomenclature of the International Astronomical Union.

Near-Earth obj.	MBA (inner)	MBA (outer)	Centaur
Mars-crosser	MBA (middle)	Jupiter trojan	Trans-Neptunian obj.
Unclassified

== 702001–702100 ==
Designation			Discovery			Properties		Ref
Permanent	Provisional	Named after	Date	Site	Discoverer(s)	Category	Diam.	Ref
702001	2005 UR_{483}	—	October 1, 2005	Anderson Mesa	LONEOS	·	1.2 km	MPC; JPL
702002	2005 UQ_{487}	—	October 3, 2005	Catalina	CSS	BRA	1.6 km	MPC; JPL
702003	2005 UH_{492}	—	October 24, 2005	Palomar	NEAT	GEF	1.1 km	MPC; JPL
702004	2005 UZ_{500}	—	October 27, 2005	Catalina	CSS	BRA	1.4 km	MPC; JPL
702005	2005 UF_{519}	—	October 1, 2005	Apache Point	SDSS Collaboration	EOS	1.5 km	MPC; JPL
702006	2005 UN_{520}	—	October 27, 2005	Apache Point	SDSS Collaboration	·	1.4 km	MPC; JPL
702007	2005 UF_{521}	—	October 27, 2005	Apache Point	SDSS Collaboration	NYS	800 m	MPC; JPL
702008	2005 UF_{531}	—	October 29, 2005	Kitt Peak	Spacewatch	KOR	1.3 km	MPC; JPL
702009	2005 UA_{534}	—	October 28, 2005	Kitt Peak	Spacewatch	·	530 m	MPC; JPL
702010	2005 UU_{534}	—	December 31, 2013	Kitt Peak	Spacewatch	NYS	1.1 km	MPC; JPL
702011	2005 UA_{535}	—	September 26, 2013	Mount Lemmon	Mount Lemmon Survey	·	890 m	MPC; JPL
702012	2005 UC_{535}	—	April 12, 2012	Haleakala	Pan-STARRS 1	BRA	1.7 km	MPC; JPL
702013	2005 UH_{535}	—	October 22, 2005	Kitt Peak	Spacewatch	NYS	1.1 km	MPC; JPL
702014	2005 UR_{535}	—	August 14, 2012	Haleakala	Pan-STARRS 1	V	580 m	MPC; JPL
702015	2005 UA_{536}	—	July 14, 2016	Haleakala	Pan-STARRS 1	·	1.0 km	MPC; JPL
702016	2005 UD_{536}	—	October 24, 2005	Mauna Kea	A. Boattini	LIX	2.6 km	MPC; JPL
702017	2005 UP_{536}	—	March 14, 2012	Mount Lemmon	Mount Lemmon Survey	BRA	1.2 km	MPC; JPL
702018	2005 UQ_{539}	—	October 25, 2005	Catalina	CSS	H	430 m	MPC; JPL
702019	2005 UB_{540}	—	October 28, 2005	Mount Lemmon	Mount Lemmon Survey	·	750 m	MPC; JPL
702020	2005 UL_{540}	—	October 1, 2014	Haleakala	Pan-STARRS 1	·	1.9 km	MPC; JPL
702021	2005 UR_{544}	—	October 27, 2005	Kitt Peak	Spacewatch	·	1.9 km	MPC; JPL
702022	2005 UT_{544}	—	December 24, 2017	Haleakala	Pan-STARRS 1	HYG	1.9 km	MPC; JPL
702023	2005 UX_{545}	—	June 2, 2016	Haleakala	Pan-STARRS 1	·	1.1 km	MPC; JPL
702024	2005 UM_{554}	—	October 29, 2005	Kitt Peak	Spacewatch	VER	2.1 km	MPC; JPL
702025	2005 UH_{555}	—	May 24, 2020	Haleakala	Pan-STARRS 1	·	660 m	MPC; JPL
702026	2005 UK_{555}	—	October 28, 2005	Mount Lemmon	Mount Lemmon Survey	·	1.5 km	MPC; JPL
702027	2005 UN_{559}	—	October 27, 2005	Kitt Peak	Spacewatch	·	1.3 km	MPC; JPL
702028	2005 VP_{2}	—	November 3, 2005	Mount Lemmon	Mount Lemmon Survey	·	1.5 km	MPC; JPL
702029	2005 VZ_{9}	—	November 2, 2005	Mount Lemmon	Mount Lemmon Survey	·	560 m	MPC; JPL
702030	2005 VV_{22}	—	November 1, 2005	Kitt Peak	Spacewatch	AGN	910 m	MPC; JPL
702031	2005 VW_{22}	—	November 1, 2005	Kitt Peak	Spacewatch	GEF	980 m	MPC; JPL
702032	2005 VM_{26}	—	November 3, 2005	Mount Lemmon	Mount Lemmon Survey	·	860 m	MPC; JPL
702033	2005 VF_{27}	—	November 3, 2005	Mount Lemmon	Mount Lemmon Survey	·	1.5 km	MPC; JPL
702034	2005 VC_{37}	—	November 3, 2005	Mount Lemmon	Mount Lemmon Survey	·	1.9 km	MPC; JPL
702035	2005 VN_{40}	—	November 4, 2005	Mount Lemmon	Mount Lemmon Survey	·	1.4 km	MPC; JPL
702036	2005 VT_{55}	—	November 4, 2005	Kitt Peak	Spacewatch	EOS	1.5 km	MPC; JPL
702037	2005 VM_{63}	—	October 30, 2005	Kitt Peak	Spacewatch	·	1.7 km	MPC; JPL
702038	2005 VM_{73}	—	November 6, 2005	Kitt Peak	Spacewatch	·	860 m	MPC; JPL
702039	2005 VQ_{86}	—	November 5, 2005	Mount Lemmon	Mount Lemmon Survey	·	1.2 km	MPC; JPL
702040	2005 VA_{91}	—	November 6, 2005	Kitt Peak	Spacewatch	H	470 m	MPC; JPL
702041	2005 VZ_{108}	—	November 6, 2005	Mount Lemmon	Mount Lemmon Survey	·	1.5 km	MPC; JPL
702042	2005 VL_{116}	—	November 11, 2005	Kitt Peak	Spacewatch	·	810 m	MPC; JPL
702043	2005 VN_{130}	—	October 26, 2005	Apache Point	SDSS Collaboration	·	1.8 km	MPC; JPL
702044	2005 VE_{131}	—	October 26, 2005	Apache Point	SDSS Collaboration	·	1.8 km	MPC; JPL
702045	2005 VN_{132}	—	October 27, 2005	Apache Point	SDSS Collaboration	·	2.8 km	MPC; JPL
702046	2005 VX_{134}	—	December 6, 2015	Mount Lemmon	Mount Lemmon Survey	·	1.9 km	MPC; JPL
702047	2005 VD_{139}	—	November 12, 2005	Kitt Peak	Spacewatch	·	1.2 km	MPC; JPL
702048	2005 VY_{139}	—	December 15, 2009	Mount Lemmon	Mount Lemmon Survey	HNS	1.1 km	MPC; JPL
702049	2005 VA_{140}	—	November 5, 2005	Kitt Peak	Spacewatch	·	1.7 km	MPC; JPL
702050	2005 VD_{142}	—	March 31, 2011	Haleakala	Pan-STARRS 1	·	790 m	MPC; JPL
702051	2005 VP_{142}	—	September 4, 2011	Haleakala	Pan-STARRS 1	·	3.2 km	MPC; JPL
702052	2005 VS_{143}	—	September 30, 2005	Mount Lemmon	Mount Lemmon Survey	·	1.1 km	MPC; JPL
702053	2005 VH_{144}	—	January 20, 2013	Kitt Peak	Spacewatch	·	580 m	MPC; JPL
702054	2005 VQ_{144}	—	February 27, 2012	Haleakala	Pan-STARRS 1	·	1.5 km	MPC; JPL
702055	2005 VC_{145}	—	May 21, 2017	Haleakala	Pan-STARRS 1	·	1.3 km	MPC; JPL
702056	2005 VH_{146}	—	March 27, 2017	Haleakala	Pan-STARRS 1	·	1.5 km	MPC; JPL
702057	2005 VW_{148}	—	August 20, 2014	Haleakala	Pan-STARRS 1	KOR	1.1 km	MPC; JPL
702058	2005 VE_{150}	—	September 17, 2010	Mount Lemmon	Mount Lemmon Survey	·	1.9 km	MPC; JPL
702059	2005 VK_{151}	—	November 5, 2005	Mount Lemmon	Mount Lemmon Survey	KOR	1.1 km	MPC; JPL
702060	2005 VN_{154}	—	November 4, 2005	Mount Lemmon	Mount Lemmon Survey	·	890 m	MPC; JPL
702061	2005 VU_{155}	—	November 12, 2005	Kitt Peak	Spacewatch	·	1.9 km	MPC; JPL
702062	2005 VM_{156}	—	November 7, 2005	Mauna Kea	A. Boattini	·	1.9 km	MPC; JPL
702063	2005 VA_{157}	—	November 3, 2005	Kitt Peak	Spacewatch	·	930 m	MPC; JPL
702064	2005 VV_{157}	—	November 1, 2005	Kitt Peak	Spacewatch	·	1.4 km	MPC; JPL
702065	2005 WE_{9}	—	November 12, 2005	Kitt Peak	Spacewatch	·	1.7 km	MPC; JPL
702066	2005 WA_{15}	—	October 27, 2005	Mount Lemmon	Mount Lemmon Survey	·	2.5 km	MPC; JPL
702067	2005 WX_{22}	—	November 12, 2005	Kitt Peak	Spacewatch	·	1.6 km	MPC; JPL
702068	2005 WD_{30}	—	November 21, 2005	Kitt Peak	Spacewatch	EOS	1.5 km	MPC; JPL
702069	2005 WX_{36}	—	November 22, 2005	Kitt Peak	Spacewatch	·	1.1 km	MPC; JPL
702070	2005 WZ_{38}	—	October 25, 2005	Mount Lemmon	Mount Lemmon Survey	·	2.0 km	MPC; JPL
702071	2005 WU_{41}	—	October 18, 2001	Palomar	NEAT	MAS	650 m	MPC; JPL
702072	2005 WH_{45}	—	October 28, 2005	Mount Lemmon	Mount Lemmon Survey	·	1.2 km	MPC; JPL
702073	2005 WR_{52}	—	November 25, 2005	Mount Lemmon	Mount Lemmon Survey	AGN	940 m	MPC; JPL
702074	2005 WN_{64}	—	October 27, 2005	Mount Lemmon	Mount Lemmon Survey	·	1.1 km	MPC; JPL
702075	2005 WV_{70}	—	February 23, 2012	Mount Lemmon	Mount Lemmon Survey	KOR	1.0 km	MPC; JPL
702076	2005 WK_{78}	—	November 25, 2005	Kitt Peak	Spacewatch	·	1.1 km	MPC; JPL
702077	2005 WC_{88}	—	November 28, 2005	Mount Lemmon	Mount Lemmon Survey	·	1.1 km	MPC; JPL
702078	2005 WB_{128}	—	November 25, 2005	Mount Lemmon	Mount Lemmon Survey	·	1.1 km	MPC; JPL
702079	2005 WG_{128}	—	November 25, 2005	Mount Lemmon	Mount Lemmon Survey	MAS	650 m	MPC; JPL
702080	2005 WT_{128}	—	November 25, 2005	Mount Lemmon	Mount Lemmon Survey	THM	1.6 km	MPC; JPL
702081	2005 WH_{131}	—	November 25, 2005	Mount Lemmon	Mount Lemmon Survey	·	1.0 km	MPC; JPL
702082	2005 WW_{139}	—	February 3, 2012	Haleakala	Pan-STARRS 1	·	1.7 km	MPC; JPL
702083	2005 WA_{146}	—	November 25, 2005	Kitt Peak	Spacewatch	·	1.6 km	MPC; JPL
702084	2005 WJ_{162}	—	August 25, 2004	Kitt Peak	Spacewatch	·	1.8 km	MPC; JPL
702085	2005 WL_{174}	—	November 26, 2005	Kitt Peak	Spacewatch	AGN	960 m	MPC; JPL
702086	2005 WG_{188}	—	November 30, 2005	Kitt Peak	Spacewatch	·	1.1 km	MPC; JPL
702087	2005 WA_{204}	—	November 25, 2005	Mount Lemmon	Mount Lemmon Survey	LIX	3.2 km	MPC; JPL
702088	2005 WM_{214}	—	January 24, 2012	Haleakala	Pan-STARRS 1	·	2.1 km	MPC; JPL
702089	2005 WD_{215}	—	February 15, 2013	Haleakala	Pan-STARRS 1	·	2.6 km	MPC; JPL
702090	2005 WL_{217}	—	November 26, 2005	Mount Lemmon	Mount Lemmon Survey	·	1.6 km	MPC; JPL
702091	2005 WO_{219}	—	November 30, 2005	Mount Lemmon	Mount Lemmon Survey	·	1.6 km	MPC; JPL
702092	2005 XU_{12}	—	November 12, 2005	Kitt Peak	Spacewatch	·	1.5 km	MPC; JPL
702093	2005 XK_{15}	—	December 1, 2005	Mount Lemmon	Mount Lemmon Survey	·	1.1 km	MPC; JPL
702094	2005 XX_{15}	—	August 1, 2000	Cerro Tololo	Deep Ecliptic Survey	·	1.0 km	MPC; JPL
702095	2005 XO_{17}	—	December 1, 2005	Kitt Peak	Spacewatch	·	1.0 km	MPC; JPL
702096	2005 XR_{17}	—	December 1, 2005	Kitt Peak	Spacewatch	·	1.3 km	MPC; JPL
702097	2005 XL_{19}	—	December 2, 2005	Kitt Peak	Spacewatch	KOR	1.0 km	MPC; JPL
702098	2005 XT_{22}	—	October 29, 2005	Mount Lemmon	Mount Lemmon Survey	·	2.0 km	MPC; JPL
702099	2005 XX_{30}	—	December 1, 2005	Kitt Peak	Spacewatch	·	2.0 km	MPC; JPL
702100	2005 XP_{53}	—	November 3, 2005	Kitt Peak	Spacewatch	·	560 m	MPC; JPL

== 702101–702200 ==
back to top

Designation			Discovery			Properties		Ref
Permanent	Provisional	Named after	Date	Site	Discoverer(s)	Category	Diam.	Ref
702101	2005 XC_{68}	—	December 6, 2005	Kitt Peak	Spacewatch	·	2.0 km	MPC; JPL
702102	2005 XF_{72}	—	December 6, 2005	Kitt Peak	Spacewatch	EOS	1.6 km	MPC; JPL
702103	2005 XQ_{75}	—	November 30, 2005	Kitt Peak	Spacewatch	·	2.3 km	MPC; JPL
702104	2005 XJ_{77}	—	December 8, 2005	Kitt Peak	Spacewatch	·	2.4 km	MPC; JPL
702105	2005 XD_{78}	—	October 28, 2005	Kitt Peak	Spacewatch	·	490 m	MPC; JPL
702106	2005 XO_{81}	—	December 7, 2005	Kitt Peak	Spacewatch	THM	1.8 km	MPC; JPL
702107	2005 XM_{88}	—	December 5, 2005	Kitt Peak	Spacewatch	·	1.6 km	MPC; JPL
702108	2005 XP_{94}	—	September 30, 2005	Mount Lemmon	Mount Lemmon Survey	·	1.4 km	MPC; JPL
702109	2005 XC_{101}	—	December 1, 2005	Kitt Peak	Wasserman, L. H., Millis, R. L.	·	1.8 km	MPC; JPL
702110	2005 XR_{103}	—	December 1, 2005	Kitt Peak	Wasserman, L. H., Millis, R. L.	THM	1.7 km	MPC; JPL
702111	2005 XV_{107}	—	October 30, 2005	Kitt Peak	Spacewatch	HOF	2.3 km	MPC; JPL
702112	2005 XY_{116}	—	December 4, 2005	Kitt Peak	Spacewatch	·	590 m	MPC; JPL
702113	2005 XG_{118}	—	February 23, 2007	Mount Lemmon	Mount Lemmon Survey	·	1.7 km	MPC; JPL
702114	2005 XZ_{119}	—	December 2, 2005	Mount Lemmon	Mount Lemmon Survey	·	840 m	MPC; JPL
702115	2005 XM_{120}	—	January 8, 2010	Mount Lemmon	Mount Lemmon Survey	·	1.0 km	MPC; JPL
702116	2005 XR_{120}	—	December 7, 2005	Kitt Peak	Spacewatch	MAR	810 m	MPC; JPL
702117	2005 XU_{120}	—	September 19, 2014	Haleakala	Pan-STARRS 1	·	1.7 km	MPC; JPL
702118	2005 XX_{120}	—	March 21, 2010	Kitt Peak	Spacewatch	(2076)	690 m	MPC; JPL
702119	2005 XK_{121}	—	April 30, 2011	Mount Lemmon	Mount Lemmon Survey	·	630 m	MPC; JPL
702120	2005 XC_{122}	—	August 4, 2011	Haleakala	Pan-STARRS 1	·	550 m	MPC; JPL
702121	2005 XG_{125}	—	December 4, 2005	Mount Lemmon	Mount Lemmon Survey	KOR	1.1 km	MPC; JPL
702122	2005 XO_{125}	—	September 5, 2010	Mount Lemmon	Mount Lemmon Survey	·	2.0 km	MPC; JPL
702123	2005 XC_{126}	—	April 10, 2018	Mount Lemmon	Mount Lemmon Survey	H	570 m	MPC; JPL
702124	2005 XD_{126}	—	January 22, 2013	Mount Lemmon	Mount Lemmon Survey	T_{j} (2.97) · 3:2	5.3 km	MPC; JPL
702125	2005 XH_{126}	—	December 5, 2008	Kitt Peak	Spacewatch	·	1.1 km	MPC; JPL
702126	2005 XR_{126}	—	January 9, 2016	Haleakala	Pan-STARRS 1	·	1.6 km	MPC; JPL
702127	2005 XH_{127}	—	December 1, 2005	Kitt Peak	Spacewatch	·	2.8 km	MPC; JPL
702128	2005 XH_{130}	—	August 27, 2014	Haleakala	Pan-STARRS 1	KOR	1.1 km	MPC; JPL
702129	2005 XC_{131}	—	May 14, 2008	Mount Lemmon	Mount Lemmon Survey	·	1.5 km	MPC; JPL
702130	2005 XM_{131}	—	November 3, 2015	Mount Lemmon	Mount Lemmon Survey	·	1.3 km	MPC; JPL
702131	2005 XJ_{132}	—	December 1, 2005	Mount Lemmon	Mount Lemmon Survey	·	1.4 km	MPC; JPL
702132	2005 XV_{132}	—	December 8, 2005	Kitt Peak	Spacewatch	·	570 m	MPC; JPL
702133	2005 XF_{133}	—	December 2, 2005	Kitt Peak	Spacewatch	·	1.7 km	MPC; JPL
702134	2005 XB_{136}	—	December 1, 2005	Kitt Peak	Wasserman, L. H., Millis, R. L.	·	990 m	MPC; JPL
702135	2005 YR_{9}	—	November 25, 2005	Kitt Peak	Spacewatch	NYS	1.1 km	MPC; JPL
702136	2005 YD_{20}	—	December 24, 2005	Kitt Peak	Spacewatch	·	1.8 km	MPC; JPL
702137	2005 YS_{21}	—	December 24, 2005	Kitt Peak	Spacewatch	·	1.8 km	MPC; JPL
702138	2005 YQ_{69}	—	December 26, 2005	Kitt Peak	Spacewatch	·	1.6 km	MPC; JPL
702139	2005 YS_{74}	—	December 8, 2005	Kitt Peak	Spacewatch	·	2.3 km	MPC; JPL
702140	2005 YU_{74}	—	December 5, 2005	Kitt Peak	Spacewatch	·	1.6 km	MPC; JPL
702141	2005 YW_{75}	—	December 24, 2005	Kitt Peak	Spacewatch	·	1.2 km	MPC; JPL
702142	2005 YG_{78}	—	December 24, 2005	Kitt Peak	Spacewatch	·	1.0 km	MPC; JPL
702143	2005 YK_{99}	—	December 10, 2005	Kitt Peak	Spacewatch	TEL	1.2 km	MPC; JPL
702144	2005 YU_{111}	—	December 25, 2005	Kitt Peak	Spacewatch	EOS	1.2 km	MPC; JPL
702145	2005 YO_{113}	—	December 25, 2005	Kitt Peak	Spacewatch	·	2.7 km	MPC; JPL
702146	2005 YF_{138}	—	December 26, 2005	Kitt Peak	Spacewatch	·	1.3 km	MPC; JPL
702147	2005 YX_{138}	—	December 1, 2005	Mount Lemmon	Mount Lemmon Survey	·	2.4 km	MPC; JPL
702148	2005 YH_{144}	—	November 29, 2005	Mount Lemmon	Mount Lemmon Survey	TIR	2.4 km	MPC; JPL
702149	2005 YV_{150}	—	December 25, 2005	Kitt Peak	Spacewatch	·	1.2 km	MPC; JPL
702150	2005 YT_{152}	—	December 6, 2005	Kitt Peak	Spacewatch	·	1.9 km	MPC; JPL
702151	2005 YC_{159}	—	December 27, 2005	Kitt Peak	Spacewatch	·	1.1 km	MPC; JPL
702152	2005 YQ_{160}	—	December 27, 2005	Kitt Peak	Spacewatch	·	1.8 km	MPC; JPL
702153	2005 YP_{166}	—	December 27, 2005	Kitt Peak	Spacewatch	EOS	1.5 km	MPC; JPL
702154	2005 YC_{169}	—	December 30, 2005	Kitt Peak	Spacewatch	·	2.2 km	MPC; JPL
702155	2005 YX_{169}	—	December 31, 2005	Kitt Peak	Spacewatch	MAR	970 m	MPC; JPL
702156	2005 YP_{174}	—	December 29, 2005	Palomar	NEAT	EUP	3.7 km	MPC; JPL
702157	2005 YW_{198}	—	December 25, 2005	Kitt Peak	Spacewatch	·	1.4 km	MPC; JPL
702158	2005 YL_{203}	—	August 21, 2019	Mount Lemmon	Mount Lemmon Survey	·	1.4 km	MPC; JPL
702159	2005 YQ_{215}	—	December 2, 2005	Kitt Peak	Spacewatch	·	650 m	MPC; JPL
702160	2005 YM_{224}	—	December 24, 2005	Kitt Peak	Spacewatch	·	1.5 km	MPC; JPL
702161	2005 YL_{230}	—	December 26, 2005	Kitt Peak	Spacewatch	·	2.1 km	MPC; JPL
702162	2005 YM_{230}	—	December 26, 2005	Kitt Peak	Spacewatch	·	2.4 km	MPC; JPL
702163	2005 YS_{235}	—	December 28, 2005	Kitt Peak	Spacewatch	·	510 m	MPC; JPL
702164	2005 YG_{240}	—	December 29, 2005	Mount Lemmon	Mount Lemmon Survey	·	1.9 km	MPC; JPL
702165	2005 YW_{242}	—	December 30, 2005	Kitt Peak	Spacewatch	EOS	1.5 km	MPC; JPL
702166	2005 YL_{243}	—	December 30, 2005	Kitt Peak	Spacewatch	·	2.1 km	MPC; JPL
702167	2005 YL_{245}	—	December 30, 2005	Mount Lemmon	Mount Lemmon Survey	·	450 m	MPC; JPL
702168	2005 YW_{250}	—	December 28, 2005	Kitt Peak	Spacewatch	·	1.6 km	MPC; JPL
702169	2005 YU_{254}	—	December 30, 2005	Kitt Peak	Spacewatch	EOS	1.5 km	MPC; JPL
702170	2005 YH_{255}	—	December 30, 2005	Kitt Peak	Spacewatch	PHO	880 m	MPC; JPL
702171	2005 YZ_{262}	—	December 25, 2005	Kitt Peak	Spacewatch	·	510 m	MPC; JPL
702172	2005 YJ_{263}	—	December 5, 2005	Mount Lemmon	Mount Lemmon Survey	·	1.7 km	MPC; JPL
702173	2005 YN_{266}	—	December 27, 2005	Kitt Peak	Spacewatch	(5)	1.1 km	MPC; JPL
702174	2005 YO_{270}	—	December 1, 2005	Mount Lemmon	Mount Lemmon Survey	H	570 m	MPC; JPL
702175	2005 YO_{286}	—	December 30, 2005	Kitt Peak	Spacewatch	·	2.8 km	MPC; JPL
702176	2005 YJ_{294}	—	November 13, 2010	Kitt Peak	Spacewatch	·	2.1 km	MPC; JPL
702177	2005 YS_{294}	—	April 23, 2007	Mount Lemmon	Mount Lemmon Survey	MAR	750 m	MPC; JPL
702178	2005 YH_{296}	—	October 8, 2012	Haleakala	Pan-STARRS 1	V	640 m	MPC; JPL
702179	2005 YP_{299}	—	November 9, 2009	Kitt Peak	Spacewatch	·	1.5 km	MPC; JPL
702180	2006 AR_{1}	—	January 2, 2006	Mount Lemmon	Mount Lemmon Survey	·	2.4 km	MPC; JPL
702181	2006 AF_{6}	—	December 27, 2005	Catalina	CSS	BAR	1.2 km	MPC; JPL
702182	2006 AQ_{17}	—	December 28, 2005	Kitt Peak	Spacewatch	·	1.4 km	MPC; JPL
702183	2006 AJ_{27}	—	January 5, 2006	Mount Lemmon	Mount Lemmon Survey	·	2.4 km	MPC; JPL
702184	2006 AV_{29}	—	January 2, 2006	Mount Lemmon	Mount Lemmon Survey	·	830 m	MPC; JPL
702185	2006 AU_{44}	—	January 7, 2006	Mount Lemmon	Mount Lemmon Survey	·	1.8 km	MPC; JPL
702186	2006 AZ_{52}	—	December 22, 2005	Kitt Peak	Spacewatch	·	2.1 km	MPC; JPL
702187	2006 AS_{53}	—	January 5, 2006	Kitt Peak	Spacewatch	(12739)	1.4 km	MPC; JPL
702188	2006 AC_{59}	—	January 4, 2006	Kitt Peak	Spacewatch	THM	2.1 km	MPC; JPL
702189	2006 AC_{61}	—	December 28, 2005	Kitt Peak	Spacewatch	·	2.2 km	MPC; JPL
702190	2006 AK_{76}	—	December 29, 2005	Kitt Peak	Spacewatch	·	1.1 km	MPC; JPL
702191	2006 AG_{80}	—	January 5, 2006	Mount Lemmon	Mount Lemmon Survey	·	2.6 km	MPC; JPL
702192	2006 AX_{87}	—	August 10, 2004	Campo Imperatore	CINEOS	·	1.0 km	MPC; JPL
702193	2006 AR_{89}	—	January 5, 2006	Kitt Peak	Spacewatch	·	2.6 km	MPC; JPL
702194	2006 AL_{92}	—	January 7, 2006	Mount Lemmon	Mount Lemmon Survey	·	1.1 km	MPC; JPL
702195	2006 AC_{93}	—	January 7, 2006	Kitt Peak	Spacewatch	EOS	1.3 km	MPC; JPL
702196	2006 AR_{108}	—	January 10, 2006	Mount Lemmon	Mount Lemmon Survey	·	1.2 km	MPC; JPL
702197	2006 AF_{109}	—	October 15, 2009	Mount Lemmon	Mount Lemmon Survey	·	1.8 km	MPC; JPL
702198	2006 AJ_{109}	—	January 8, 2006	Kitt Peak	Spacewatch	·	2.0 km	MPC; JPL
702199	2006 AM_{109}	—	January 4, 2006	Kitt Peak	Spacewatch	KON	1.8 km	MPC; JPL
702200	2006 AN_{110}	—	January 18, 2015	Haleakala	Pan-STARRS 1	·	1.4 km	MPC; JPL

== 702201–702300 ==
back to top

Designation			Discovery			Properties		Ref
Permanent	Provisional	Named after	Date	Site	Discoverer(s)	Category	Diam.	Ref
702201	2006 AQ_{111}	—	December 24, 2005	Kitt Peak	Spacewatch	·	2.0 km	MPC; JPL
702202	2006 AW_{111}	—	January 26, 2017	Mount Lemmon	Mount Lemmon Survey	·	2.4 km	MPC; JPL
702203	2006 AK_{112}	—	October 1, 2014	Haleakala	Pan-STARRS 1	EOS	1.3 km	MPC; JPL
702204	2006 AE_{113}	—	September 4, 2014	Haleakala	Pan-STARRS 1	EOS	1.4 km	MPC; JPL
702205	2006 AJ_{113}	—	June 6, 2018	Haleakala	Pan-STARRS 1	·	1.3 km	MPC; JPL
702206	2006 AS_{113}	—	December 10, 2010	Mount Lemmon	Mount Lemmon Survey	EOS	1.5 km	MPC; JPL
702207	2006 AZ_{114}	—	January 9, 2006	Kitt Peak	Spacewatch	T_{j} (2.96) · 3:2	3.9 km	MPC; JPL
702208	2006 AL_{115}	—	January 5, 2006	Kitt Peak	Spacewatch	·	1.1 km	MPC; JPL
702209	2006 AB_{116}	—	January 7, 2006	Mount Lemmon	Mount Lemmon Survey	·	1.2 km	MPC; JPL
702210	2006 AD_{116}	—	January 5, 2006	Kitt Peak	Spacewatch	·	1.5 km	MPC; JPL
702211	2006 AO_{117}	—	January 8, 2006	Mount Lemmon	Mount Lemmon Survey	·	1.1 km	MPC; JPL
702212	2006 AS_{117}	—	January 7, 2006	Kitt Peak	Spacewatch	·	1.4 km	MPC; JPL
702213	2006 BK	—	January 18, 2006	Catalina	CSS	PHO	1.2 km	MPC; JPL
702214	2006 BB_{5}	—	January 16, 1996	Kitt Peak	Spacewatch	·	2.0 km	MPC; JPL
702215	2006 BC_{5}	—	January 21, 2006	Kitt Peak	Spacewatch	·	1.7 km	MPC; JPL
702216	2006 BD_{12}	—	January 21, 2006	Kitt Peak	Spacewatch	·	990 m	MPC; JPL
702217	2006 BA_{16}	—	January 8, 2006	Kitt Peak	Spacewatch	·	2.7 km	MPC; JPL
702218	2006 BK_{24}	—	January 8, 2006	Mount Lemmon	Mount Lemmon Survey	MAR	1.0 km	MPC; JPL
702219	2006 BU_{29}	—	January 23, 2006	Kitt Peak	Spacewatch	·	570 m	MPC; JPL
702220	2006 BK_{35}	—	January 23, 2006	Kitt Peak	Spacewatch	·	990 m	MPC; JPL
702221	2006 BF_{41}	—	January 22, 2006	Mount Lemmon	Mount Lemmon Survey	NYS	1.1 km	MPC; JPL
702222	2006 BK_{42}	—	January 23, 2006	Kitt Peak	Spacewatch	·	1.7 km	MPC; JPL
702223	2006 BL_{48}	—	January 25, 2006	Kitt Peak	Spacewatch	·	1.9 km	MPC; JPL
702224	2006 BG_{49}	—	January 7, 2006	Kitt Peak	Spacewatch	·	1.2 km	MPC; JPL
702225	2006 BT_{50}	—	January 25, 2006	Kitt Peak	Spacewatch	·	2.4 km	MPC; JPL
702226	2006 BF_{58}	—	January 23, 2006	Mount Lemmon	Mount Lemmon Survey	·	1.3 km	MPC; JPL
702227	2006 BL_{68}	—	December 2, 2005	Kitt Peak	Wasserman, L. H., Millis, R. L.	·	1.7 km	MPC; JPL
702228	2006 BF_{78}	—	January 23, 2006	Mount Lemmon	Mount Lemmon Survey	·	2.0 km	MPC; JPL
702229	2006 BE_{79}	—	May 25, 2001	Palomar	NEAT	TIR	2.7 km	MPC; JPL
702230	2006 BG_{85}	—	January 25, 2006	Kitt Peak	Spacewatch	MAR	750 m	MPC; JPL
702231	2006 BK_{112}	—	January 25, 2006	Kitt Peak	Spacewatch	·	1.4 km	MPC; JPL
702232	2006 BG_{113}	—	January 25, 2006	Kitt Peak	Spacewatch	·	620 m	MPC; JPL
702233	2006 BT_{122}	—	January 26, 2006	Kitt Peak	Spacewatch	·	1.3 km	MPC; JPL
702234	2006 BV_{132}	—	November 21, 2001	Apache Point	SDSS Collaboration	·	910 m	MPC; JPL
702235	2006 BK_{134}	—	January 27, 2006	Mount Lemmon	Mount Lemmon Survey	·	2.3 km	MPC; JPL
702236	2006 BQ_{137}	—	January 28, 2006	Mount Lemmon	Mount Lemmon Survey	·	2.2 km	MPC; JPL
702237	2006 BG_{141}	—	January 25, 2006	Kitt Peak	Spacewatch	·	1.4 km	MPC; JPL
702238	2006 BM_{151}	—	January 25, 2006	Kitt Peak	Spacewatch	·	990 m	MPC; JPL
702239	2006 BJ_{159}	—	November 7, 2005	Mauna Kea	A. Boattini	·	1.1 km	MPC; JPL
702240	2006 BK_{162}	—	January 26, 2006	Mount Lemmon	Mount Lemmon Survey	·	2.0 km	MPC; JPL
702241	2006 BS_{166}	—	January 26, 2006	Mount Lemmon	Mount Lemmon Survey	·	2.5 km	MPC; JPL
702242	2006 BW_{167}	—	October 7, 2005	Mauna Kea	A. Boattini	THM	2.0 km	MPC; JPL
702243	2006 BY_{169}	—	August 3, 2014	Haleakala	Pan-STARRS 1	·	2.1 km	MPC; JPL
702244	2006 BC_{174}	—	January 27, 2006	Kitt Peak	Spacewatch	·	1.1 km	MPC; JPL
702245	2006 BV_{175}	—	January 27, 2006	Kitt Peak	Spacewatch	·	1.2 km	MPC; JPL
702246	2006 BT_{176}	—	January 27, 2006	Kitt Peak	Spacewatch	·	770 m	MPC; JPL
702247	2006 BJ_{180}	—	September 11, 2004	Kitt Peak	Spacewatch	·	1.3 km	MPC; JPL
702248	2006 BN_{193}	—	January 30, 2006	Kitt Peak	Spacewatch	·	840 m	MPC; JPL
702249	2006 BP_{205}	—	January 31, 2006	Mount Lemmon	Mount Lemmon Survey	·	1.7 km	MPC; JPL
702250	2006 BM_{206}	—	January 5, 2006	Mount Lemmon	Mount Lemmon Survey	·	1.9 km	MPC; JPL
702251	2006 BW_{208}	—	September 21, 2000	Kitt Peak	Deep Ecliptic Survey	·	1.2 km	MPC; JPL
702252	2006 BH_{209}	—	January 31, 2006	Mount Lemmon	Mount Lemmon Survey	NYS	1.1 km	MPC; JPL
702253	2006 BU_{212}	—	February 2, 2006	Kitt Peak	Spacewatch	·	2.2 km	MPC; JPL
702254	2006 BL_{218}	—	January 27, 2006	Mount Lemmon	Mount Lemmon Survey	·	1.9 km	MPC; JPL
702255	2006 BO_{224}	—	January 30, 2006	Kitt Peak	Spacewatch	·	540 m	MPC; JPL
702256	2006 BX_{228}	—	January 31, 2006	Kitt Peak	Spacewatch	·	770 m	MPC; JPL
702257	2006 BE_{234}	—	January 31, 2006	Kitt Peak	Spacewatch	·	1.3 km	MPC; JPL
702258	2006 BR_{234}	—	January 31, 2006	Kitt Peak	Spacewatch	KOR	1.1 km	MPC; JPL
702259	2006 BN_{237}	—	January 31, 2006	Kitt Peak	Spacewatch	KOR	1.0 km	MPC; JPL
702260	2006 BM_{241}	—	January 31, 2006	Kitt Peak	Spacewatch	·	930 m	MPC; JPL
702261	2006 BY_{241}	—	January 31, 2006	Kitt Peak	Spacewatch	·	1.6 km	MPC; JPL
702262	2006 BC_{244}	—	January 31, 2006	Kitt Peak	Spacewatch	·	1.7 km	MPC; JPL
702263	2006 BG_{244}	—	January 25, 2006	Kitt Peak	Spacewatch	·	990 m	MPC; JPL
702264	2006 BL_{249}	—	January 31, 2006	Kitt Peak	Spacewatch	·	1.4 km	MPC; JPL
702265	2006 BX_{249}	—	January 31, 2006	Mount Lemmon	Mount Lemmon Survey	EOS	1.4 km	MPC; JPL
702266	2006 BO_{252}	—	January 31, 2006	Kitt Peak	Spacewatch	·	1.4 km	MPC; JPL
702267	2006 BX_{253}	—	January 31, 2006	Kitt Peak	Spacewatch	·	2.0 km	MPC; JPL
702268	2006 BY_{254}	—	January 31, 2006	Kitt Peak	Spacewatch	·	2.2 km	MPC; JPL
702269	2006 BA_{257}	—	January 31, 2006	Kitt Peak	Spacewatch	·	2.1 km	MPC; JPL
702270	2006 BZ_{259}	—	January 31, 2006	Mount Lemmon	Mount Lemmon Survey	·	1.8 km	MPC; JPL
702271	2006 BM_{260}	—	January 31, 2006	Kitt Peak	Spacewatch	·	830 m	MPC; JPL
702272	2006 BC_{261}	—	January 31, 2006	Mount Lemmon	Mount Lemmon Survey	L5	6.1 km	MPC; JPL
702273	2006 BL_{284}	—	September 28, 2008	Mount Lemmon	Mount Lemmon Survey	HOF	2.2 km	MPC; JPL
702274	2006 BM_{285}	—	February 16, 2015	Haleakala	Pan-STARRS 1	·	1.1 km	MPC; JPL
702275	2006 BG_{286}	—	January 22, 2006	Mount Lemmon	Mount Lemmon Survey	KOR	1.1 km	MPC; JPL
702276	2006 BZ_{286}	—	January 23, 2006	Kitt Peak	Spacewatch	(5)	1.1 km	MPC; JPL
702277	2006 BB_{287}	—	January 23, 2006	Kitt Peak	Spacewatch	THM	2.1 km	MPC; JPL
702278	2006 BJ_{288}	—	June 3, 2011	Mount Lemmon	Mount Lemmon Survey	·	1.1 km	MPC; JPL
702279	2006 BL_{288}	—	January 30, 2006	Kitt Peak	Spacewatch	·	1.6 km	MPC; JPL
702280	2006 BO_{288}	—	January 31, 2006	Kitt Peak	Spacewatch	·	1.1 km	MPC; JPL
702281	2006 BX_{288}	—	August 31, 2011	Haleakala	Pan-STARRS 1	L5	8.2 km	MPC; JPL
702282	2006 BE_{289}	—	January 31, 2006	Kitt Peak	Spacewatch	·	2.1 km	MPC; JPL
702283	2006 BV_{289}	—	January 30, 2006	Kitt Peak	Spacewatch	·	2.5 km	MPC; JPL
702284	2006 BX_{289}	—	October 4, 2013	Mount Lemmon	Mount Lemmon Survey	·	1.4 km	MPC; JPL
702285	2006 BL_{291}	—	August 27, 2014	Haleakala	Pan-STARRS 1	·	2.3 km	MPC; JPL
702286	2006 BV_{291}	—	January 26, 2006	Mount Lemmon	Mount Lemmon Survey	·	1.7 km	MPC; JPL
702287	2006 BE_{293}	—	January 27, 2006	Mount Lemmon	Mount Lemmon Survey	EOS	1.5 km	MPC; JPL
702288	2006 BG_{293}	—	September 19, 2014	Haleakala	Pan-STARRS 1	·	2.4 km	MPC; JPL
702289	2006 BJ_{293}	—	January 25, 2006	Kitt Peak	Spacewatch	·	850 m	MPC; JPL
702290	2006 BQ_{293}	—	January 23, 2006	Kitt Peak	Spacewatch	L5	10 km	MPC; JPL
702291	2006 BS_{293}	—	January 23, 2006	Kitt Peak	Spacewatch	EOS	1.4 km	MPC; JPL
702292	2006 BG_{295}	—	March 15, 2012	Mount Lemmon	Mount Lemmon Survey	EOS	1.8 km	MPC; JPL
702293	2006 BH_{295}	—	January 31, 2006	Mount Lemmon	Mount Lemmon Survey	L5	9.2 km	MPC; JPL
702294	2006 BW_{295}	—	January 31, 2006	Kitt Peak	Spacewatch	·	2.5 km	MPC; JPL
702295	2006 BZ_{295}	—	April 23, 2018	Mount Lemmon	Mount Lemmon Survey	EOS	1.4 km	MPC; JPL
702296	2006 BK_{298}	—	January 27, 2006	Mount Lemmon	Mount Lemmon Survey	·	2.5 km	MPC; JPL
702297	2006 BG_{302}	—	January 31, 2006	Kitt Peak	Spacewatch	·	1.7 km	MPC; JPL
702298	2006 CK_{3}	—	February 1, 2006	Mount Lemmon	Mount Lemmon Survey	·	810 m	MPC; JPL
702299	2006 CV_{6}	—	February 1, 2006	Mount Lemmon	Mount Lemmon Survey	·	580 m	MPC; JPL
702300	2006 CG_{7}	—	February 1, 2006	Mount Lemmon	Mount Lemmon Survey	·	1.1 km	MPC; JPL

== 702301–702400 ==
back to top

Designation			Discovery			Properties		Ref
Permanent	Provisional	Named after	Date	Site	Discoverer(s)	Category	Diam.	Ref
702301	2006 CV_{16}	—	February 1, 2006	Mount Lemmon	Mount Lemmon Survey	·	1.3 km	MPC; JPL
702302	2006 CN_{19}	—	February 1, 2006	Mount Lemmon	Mount Lemmon Survey	·	2.5 km	MPC; JPL
702303	2006 CE_{21}	—	February 1, 2006	Mount Lemmon	Mount Lemmon Survey	·	2.6 km	MPC; JPL
702304	2006 CK_{27}	—	February 2, 2006	Kitt Peak	Spacewatch	EOS	1.4 km	MPC; JPL
702305	2006 CA_{30}	—	August 26, 2003	Cerro Tololo	Deep Ecliptic Survey	·	1.8 km	MPC; JPL
702306	2006 CS_{30}	—	February 2, 2006	Kitt Peak	Spacewatch	·	1.1 km	MPC; JPL
702307	2006 CS_{31}	—	February 2, 2006	Kitt Peak	Spacewatch	·	3.3 km	MPC; JPL
702308	2006 CH_{33}	—	January 9, 2006	Kitt Peak	Spacewatch	·	2.0 km	MPC; JPL
702309	2006 CM_{33}	—	February 2, 2006	Mount Lemmon	Mount Lemmon Survey	·	2.1 km	MPC; JPL
702310	2006 CF_{36}	—	February 2, 2006	Mount Lemmon	Mount Lemmon Survey	·	1.2 km	MPC; JPL
702311	2006 CU_{45}	—	February 7, 2006	Kitt Peak	Spacewatch	·	1.9 km	MPC; JPL
702312	2006 CF_{46}	—	February 7, 2006	Mount Lemmon	Mount Lemmon Survey	EUN	1.3 km	MPC; JPL
702313	2006 CW_{55}	—	February 4, 2006	Mount Lemmon	Mount Lemmon Survey	ANF	1.2 km	MPC; JPL
702314	2006 CP_{56}	—	January 2, 2009	Kitt Peak	Spacewatch	·	580 m	MPC; JPL
702315	2006 CU_{58}	—	July 20, 1999	Kitt Peak	Spacewatch	·	1.6 km	MPC; JPL
702316	2006 CW_{68}	—	February 1, 2006	Kitt Peak	Spacewatch	·	1.2 km	MPC; JPL
702317	2006 CR_{70}	—	December 2, 2005	Kitt Peak	L. H. Wasserman, R. L. Millis	·	2.1 km	MPC; JPL
702318	2006 CS_{73}	—	May 15, 2013	Haleakala	Pan-STARRS 1	·	2.8 km	MPC; JPL
702319	2006 CU_{75}	—	February 3, 2006	Mauna Kea	P. A. Wiegert, R. Rasmussen	·	1.8 km	MPC; JPL
702320	2006 CM_{76}	—	February 3, 2006	Mauna Kea	P. A. Wiegert, R. Rasmussen	·	2.1 km	MPC; JPL
702321	2006 CR_{77}	—	February 6, 2002	Kitt Peak	Deep Ecliptic Survey	·	1.0 km	MPC; JPL
702322	2006 CU_{78}	—	September 10, 2007	Mount Lemmon	Mount Lemmon Survey	·	520 m	MPC; JPL
702323	2006 CP_{79}	—	March 13, 2010	Kitt Peak	Spacewatch	MAS	670 m	MPC; JPL
702324	2006 CB_{82}	—	February 2, 2006	Kitt Peak	Spacewatch	L5	10 km	MPC; JPL
702325	2006 CC_{82}	—	October 8, 2012	Haleakala	Pan-STARRS 1	·	1.4 km	MPC; JPL
702326	2006 CD_{82}	—	January 27, 2011	Mount Lemmon	Mount Lemmon Survey	·	2.0 km	MPC; JPL
702327	2006 CP_{84}	—	January 9, 2017	Mount Lemmon	Mount Lemmon Survey	·	2.2 km	MPC; JPL
702328	2006 CU_{84}	—	December 19, 2009	Mount Lemmon	Mount Lemmon Survey	·	1.3 km	MPC; JPL
702329	2006 CW_{84}	—	February 5, 2006	Mount Lemmon	Mount Lemmon Survey	·	2.1 km	MPC; JPL
702330	2006 CX_{85}	—	January 4, 2017	Haleakala	Pan-STARRS 1	·	2.9 km	MPC; JPL
702331	2006 CZ_{85}	—	May 14, 2015	Haleakala	Pan-STARRS 1	EUN	950 m	MPC; JPL
702332	2006 CF_{86}	—	February 3, 2017	Haleakala	Pan-STARRS 1	EMA	2.1 km	MPC; JPL
702333	2006 CX_{86}	—	February 4, 2017	Haleakala	Pan-STARRS 1	EOS	1.4 km	MPC; JPL
702334	2006 CK_{87}	—	March 29, 2018	Mount Lemmon	Mount Lemmon Survey	·	2.3 km	MPC; JPL
702335	2006 CX_{87}	—	March 6, 2011	Mount Lemmon	Mount Lemmon Survey	·	1.3 km	MPC; JPL
702336	2006 CT_{88}	—	September 24, 2012	Kitt Peak	Spacewatch	·	830 m	MPC; JPL
702337	2006 CY_{88}	—	February 4, 2006	Kitt Peak	Spacewatch	VER	2.0 km	MPC; JPL
702338	2006 CK_{89}	—	July 28, 2014	Haleakala	Pan-STARRS 1	·	1.9 km	MPC; JPL
702339	2006 CJ_{92}	—	February 4, 2006	Mount Lemmon	Mount Lemmon Survey	·	970 m	MPC; JPL
702340	2006 CK_{93}	—	April 21, 2007	Cerro Tololo	Wasserman, L. H.	·	1.4 km	MPC; JPL
702341	2006 CT_{93}	—	October 16, 2009	Kitt Peak	Spacewatch	·	2.1 km	MPC; JPL
702342	2006 DQ_{4}	—	February 20, 2006	Kitt Peak	Spacewatch	·	2.5 km	MPC; JPL
702343	2006 DU_{15}	—	January 23, 2006	Kitt Peak	Spacewatch	KOR	1.3 km	MPC; JPL
702344	2006 DZ_{18}	—	February 20, 2006	Kitt Peak	Spacewatch	KOR	1.2 km	MPC; JPL
702345	2006 DV_{22}	—	February 20, 2006	Kitt Peak	Spacewatch	·	630 m	MPC; JPL
702346	2006 DH_{30}	—	February 20, 2006	Kitt Peak	Spacewatch	·	2.0 km	MPC; JPL
702347	2006 DU_{46}	—	January 26, 2006	Mount Lemmon	Mount Lemmon Survey	·	1.6 km	MPC; JPL
702348	2006 DA_{51}	—	February 23, 2006	Mount Lemmon	Mount Lemmon Survey	·	1.4 km	MPC; JPL
702349	2006 DM_{55}	—	February 24, 2006	Mount Lemmon	Mount Lemmon Survey	L5	8.6 km	MPC; JPL
702350	2006 DD_{61}	—	February 24, 2006	Kitt Peak	Spacewatch	·	2.1 km	MPC; JPL
702351	2006 DA_{71}	—	September 28, 2001	Palomar	NEAT	·	560 m	MPC; JPL
702352	2006 DJ_{73}	—	February 22, 2006	Mount Lemmon	Mount Lemmon Survey	·	3.1 km	MPC; JPL
702353	2006 DO_{75}	—	January 23, 2006	Kitt Peak	Spacewatch	V	520 m	MPC; JPL
702354	2006 DR_{77}	—	February 24, 2006	Kitt Peak	Spacewatch	KOR	1.2 km	MPC; JPL
702355	2006 DK_{85}	—	February 24, 2006	Mount Lemmon	Mount Lemmon Survey	·	900 m	MPC; JPL
702356	2006 DA_{90}	—	February 24, 2006	Kitt Peak	Spacewatch	·	2.0 km	MPC; JPL
702357	2006 DM_{104}	—	February 25, 2006	Kitt Peak	Spacewatch	·	2.0 km	MPC; JPL
702358	2006 DJ_{106}	—	February 25, 2006	Mount Lemmon	Mount Lemmon Survey	·	1.3 km	MPC; JPL
702359	2006 DW_{117}	—	February 27, 2006	Kitt Peak	Spacewatch	·	2.0 km	MPC; JPL
702360	2006 DH_{133}	—	February 25, 2006	Kitt Peak	Spacewatch	·	1.6 km	MPC; JPL
702361	2006 DZ_{134}	—	January 31, 2006	Kitt Peak	Spacewatch	EOS	1.6 km	MPC; JPL
702362	2006 DK_{139}	—	February 25, 2006	Kitt Peak	Spacewatch	·	690 m	MPC; JPL
702363	2006 DU_{149}	—	February 25, 2006	Kitt Peak	Spacewatch	·	920 m	MPC; JPL
702364	2006 DX_{150}	—	February 25, 2006	Kitt Peak	Spacewatch	·	1.1 km	MPC; JPL
702365	2006 DH_{156}	—	February 27, 2006	Kitt Peak	Spacewatch	THM	2.0 km	MPC; JPL
702366	2006 DK_{163}	—	February 27, 2006	Mount Lemmon	Mount Lemmon Survey	MIS	1.9 km	MPC; JPL
702367	2006 DK_{164}	—	February 27, 2006	Kitt Peak	Spacewatch	·	1.6 km	MPC; JPL
702368	2006 DE_{180}	—	February 27, 2006	Mount Lemmon	Mount Lemmon Survey	·	1.6 km	MPC; JPL
702369	2006 DP_{183}	—	February 27, 2006	Kitt Peak	Spacewatch	·	1.9 km	MPC; JPL
702370	2006 DJ_{194}	—	February 28, 2006	Mount Lemmon	Mount Lemmon Survey	·	1.1 km	MPC; JPL
702371	2006 DE_{209}	—	February 27, 2006	Mount Lemmon	Mount Lemmon Survey	·	790 m	MPC; JPL
702372	2006 DA_{211}	—	February 24, 2006	Kitt Peak	Spacewatch	·	570 m	MPC; JPL
702373	2006 DG_{217}	—	February 27, 2006	Kitt Peak	Spacewatch	·	1.8 km	MPC; JPL
702374	2006 DQ_{219}	—	February 20, 2006	Mount Lemmon	Mount Lemmon Survey	·	1.6 km	MPC; JPL
702375	2006 DH_{220}	—	July 1, 2008	Kitt Peak	Spacewatch	·	2.2 km	MPC; JPL
702376	2006 DM_{220}	—	July 3, 2016	Mount Lemmon	Mount Lemmon Survey	(5)	1.1 km	MPC; JPL
702377	2006 DY_{220}	—	April 14, 2015	Cerro Paranal	Altmann, M., Prusti, T.	·	1.1 km	MPC; JPL
702378	2006 DZ_{220}	—	January 6, 2010	Kitt Peak	Spacewatch	·	980 m	MPC; JPL
702379	2006 DA_{221}	—	August 23, 2014	Haleakala	Pan-STARRS 1	·	1.9 km	MPC; JPL
702380	2006 DR_{221}	—	October 1, 2008	Kitt Peak	Spacewatch	·	2.3 km	MPC; JPL
702381	2006 DT_{221}	—	February 24, 2006	Kitt Peak	Spacewatch	·	1.3 km	MPC; JPL
702382	2006 DU_{221}	—	February 25, 2006	Kitt Peak	Spacewatch	·	1.2 km	MPC; JPL
702383	2006 DC_{223}	—	September 17, 2014	Haleakala	Pan-STARRS 1	·	2.0 km	MPC; JPL
702384	2006 DF_{223}	—	February 27, 2006	Kitt Peak	Spacewatch	·	1.1 km	MPC; JPL
702385	2006 DG_{223}	—	August 28, 2014	Haleakala	Pan-STARRS 1	·	2.3 km	MPC; JPL
702386	2006 DY_{224}	—	February 24, 2006	Kitt Peak	Spacewatch	·	1.3 km	MPC; JPL
702387	2006 DC_{226}	—	February 25, 2006	Kitt Peak	Spacewatch	·	1.9 km	MPC; JPL
702388	2006 EB_{4}	—	March 2, 2006	Kitt Peak	Spacewatch	EUN	800 m	MPC; JPL
702389	2006 EM_{4}	—	March 2, 2006	Kitt Peak	Spacewatch	KOR	1.1 km	MPC; JPL
702390	2006 EU_{7}	—	March 2, 2006	Kitt Peak	Spacewatch	·	2.0 km	MPC; JPL
702391	2006 EC_{13}	—	March 2, 2006	Kitt Peak	Spacewatch	VER	2.0 km	MPC; JPL
702392	2006 EC_{15}	—	February 24, 2006	Kitt Peak	Spacewatch	·	520 m	MPC; JPL
702393	2006 EG_{27}	—	February 1, 2006	Mount Lemmon	Mount Lemmon Survey	L5	8.0 km	MPC; JPL
702394	2006 EL_{27}	—	March 3, 2006	Kitt Peak	Spacewatch	·	1.0 km	MPC; JPL
702395	2006 EO_{27}	—	March 3, 2006	Mount Lemmon	Mount Lemmon Survey	·	2.4 km	MPC; JPL
702396	2006 EH_{38}	—	March 4, 2006	Kitt Peak	Spacewatch	KOR	1.2 km	MPC; JPL
702397	2006 EY_{41}	—	March 4, 2006	Catalina	CSS	THB	2.6 km	MPC; JPL
702398	2006 EE_{42}	—	March 4, 2006	Kitt Peak	Spacewatch	·	2.0 km	MPC; JPL
702399	2006 EX_{54}	—	March 5, 2006	Kitt Peak	Spacewatch	·	2.6 km	MPC; JPL
702400	2006 EH_{55}	—	March 22, 2001	Kitt Peak	Spacewatch	·	2.0 km	MPC; JPL

== 702401–702500 ==
back to top

Designation			Discovery			Properties		Ref
Permanent	Provisional	Named after	Date	Site	Discoverer(s)	Category	Diam.	Ref
702401	2006 ED_{77}	—	September 6, 2008	Mount Lemmon	Mount Lemmon Survey	·	1.3 km	MPC; JPL
702402	2006 EO_{77}	—	November 7, 2012	Mount Lemmon	Mount Lemmon Survey	·	1.2 km	MPC; JPL
702403	2006 EC_{78}	—	March 27, 2012	Mount Lemmon	Mount Lemmon Survey	·	2.7 km	MPC; JPL
702404	2006 EQ_{78}	—	March 22, 2015	Haleakala	Pan-STARRS 1	·	1.3 km	MPC; JPL
702405	2006 EW_{78}	—	December 17, 2012	ESA OGS	ESA OGS	·	1 km	MPC; JPL
702406	2006 EZ_{78}	—	September 24, 2008	Mount Lemmon	Mount Lemmon Survey	·	2.9 km	MPC; JPL
702407	2006 EW_{79}	—	March 2, 2006	Mount Lemmon	Mount Lemmon Survey	VER	2.1 km	MPC; JPL
702408	2006 EK_{80}	—	May 16, 2018	Mount Lemmon	Mount Lemmon Survey	VER	1.9 km	MPC; JPL
702409	2006 ET_{81}	—	March 3, 2006	Kitt Peak	Spacewatch	·	1.4 km	MPC; JPL
702410	2006 EX_{81}	—	March 2, 2006	Mount Lemmon	Mount Lemmon Survey	·	1.9 km	MPC; JPL
702411	2006 EV_{82}	—	March 3, 2006	Kitt Peak	Spacewatch	LIX	2.3 km	MPC; JPL
702412	2006 FW_{4}	—	January 31, 2006	Kitt Peak	Spacewatch	·	620 m	MPC; JPL
702413	2006 FA_{12}	—	March 23, 2006	Kitt Peak	Spacewatch	·	1.9 km	MPC; JPL
702414	2006 FU_{16}	—	March 23, 2006	Kitt Peak	Spacewatch	·	980 m	MPC; JPL
702415	2006 FH_{23}	—	March 24, 2006	Kitt Peak	Spacewatch	·	2.6 km	MPC; JPL
702416	2006 FW_{42}	—	October 31, 2005	Mauna Kea	A. Boattini	·	1.8 km	MPC; JPL
702417	2006 FM_{56}	—	March 25, 2006	Kitt Peak	Spacewatch	·	2.4 km	MPC; JPL
702418	2006 FP_{56}	—	March 25, 2006	Kitt Peak	Spacewatch	(5)	1.5 km	MPC; JPL
702419	2006 FV_{56}	—	October 20, 2008	Kitt Peak	Spacewatch	·	2.1 km	MPC; JPL
702420	2006 FW_{56}	—	September 6, 2008	Mount Lemmon	Mount Lemmon Survey	·	2.7 km	MPC; JPL
702421	2006 FS_{57}	—	March 23, 2006	Kitt Peak	Spacewatch	·	710 m	MPC; JPL
702422	2006 FF_{58}	—	March 25, 2006	Mount Lemmon	Mount Lemmon Survey	·	1.9 km	MPC; JPL
702423	2006 FL_{58}	—	December 5, 2016	Mount Lemmon	Mount Lemmon Survey	(5)	1.1 km	MPC; JPL
702424	2006 FU_{58}	—	August 12, 2013	Kitt Peak	Spacewatch	·	2.0 km	MPC; JPL
702425	2006 FH_{59}	—	February 5, 2016	Haleakala	Pan-STARRS 1	·	2.2 km	MPC; JPL
702426	2006 FP_{59}	—	September 6, 2008	Mount Lemmon	Mount Lemmon Survey	·	2.6 km	MPC; JPL
702427	2006 FZ_{59}	—	March 23, 2006	Kitt Peak	Spacewatch	·	490 m	MPC; JPL
702428	2006 FE_{60}	—	April 27, 2012	Haleakala	Pan-STARRS 1	·	2.5 km	MPC; JPL
702429	2006 GJ_{6}	—	April 2, 2006	Kitt Peak	Spacewatch	·	1.2 km	MPC; JPL
702430	2006 GT_{6}	—	April 2, 2006	Kitt Peak	Spacewatch	·	990 m	MPC; JPL
702431	2006 GU_{8}	—	April 2, 2006	Kitt Peak	Spacewatch	·	1.2 km	MPC; JPL
702432	2006 GF_{14}	—	April 2, 2006	Kitt Peak	Spacewatch	·	2.7 km	MPC; JPL
702433	2006 GL_{15}	—	April 2, 2006	Kitt Peak	Spacewatch	·	1.8 km	MPC; JPL
702434	2006 GZ_{15}	—	April 2, 2006	Kitt Peak	Spacewatch	·	870 m	MPC; JPL
702435	2006 GZ_{17}	—	April 2, 2006	Kitt Peak	Spacewatch	·	1.0 km	MPC; JPL
702436	2006 GU_{27}	—	April 2, 2006	Kitt Peak	Spacewatch	·	2.9 km	MPC; JPL
702437	2006 GJ_{29}	—	April 2, 2006	Kitt Peak	Spacewatch	VER	2.1 km	MPC; JPL
702438	2006 GU_{30}	—	February 27, 2006	Mount Lemmon	Mount Lemmon Survey	·	1.4 km	MPC; JPL
702439	2006 GP_{34}	—	April 7, 2006	Catalina	CSS	·	2.9 km	MPC; JPL
702440	2006 GS_{40}	—	February 24, 2006	Palomar	NEAT	·	2.5 km	MPC; JPL
702441	2006 GT_{48}	—	March 26, 2006	Kitt Peak	Spacewatch	·	3.1 km	MPC; JPL
702442	2006 GR_{53}	—	January 20, 2002	Kitt Peak	Spacewatch	·	650 m	MPC; JPL
702443	2006 GB_{56}	—	March 3, 2006	Kitt Peak	Spacewatch	·	850 m	MPC; JPL
702444	2006 GC_{56}	—	April 7, 2006	Kitt Peak	Spacewatch	HYG	2.3 km	MPC; JPL
702445	2006 GE_{56}	—	October 27, 2008	Kitt Peak	Spacewatch	·	940 m	MPC; JPL
702446	2006 GH_{56}	—	February 10, 2016	Haleakala	Pan-STARRS 1	·	2.5 km	MPC; JPL
702447	2006 GT_{56}	—	April 7, 2006	Kitt Peak	Spacewatch	EOS	1.5 km	MPC; JPL
702448	2006 GV_{56}	—	April 7, 2006	Kitt Peak	Spacewatch	·	2.4 km	MPC; JPL
702449	2006 GJ_{57}	—	April 2, 2006	Kitt Peak	Spacewatch	·	2.2 km	MPC; JPL
702450	2006 GL_{57}	—	January 25, 2015	Haleakala	Pan-STARRS 1	·	1.4 km	MPC; JPL
702451	2006 GK_{59}	—	April 7, 2006	Kitt Peak	Spacewatch	V	480 m	MPC; JPL
702452	2006 HQ_{15}	—	April 20, 2006	Kitt Peak	Spacewatch	EOS	1.7 km	MPC; JPL
702453	2006 HL_{16}	—	April 20, 2006	Kitt Peak	Spacewatch	·	2.0 km	MPC; JPL
702454	2006 HJ_{37}	—	April 5, 2006	Bergisch Gladbach	W. Bickel	·	1.3 km	MPC; JPL
702455	2006 HO_{37}	—	March 24, 2006	Mount Lemmon	Mount Lemmon Survey	·	1.9 km	MPC; JPL
702456	2006 HQ_{45}	—	April 25, 2006	Kitt Peak	Spacewatch	·	960 m	MPC; JPL
702457	2006 HR_{46}	—	April 20, 2006	Kitt Peak	Spacewatch	·	610 m	MPC; JPL
702458	2006 HP_{73}	—	April 25, 2006	Kitt Peak	Spacewatch	·	2.4 km	MPC; JPL
702459	2006 HY_{74}	—	April 25, 2006	Kitt Peak	Spacewatch	·	1.1 km	MPC; JPL
702460	2006 HL_{80}	—	April 26, 2006	Kitt Peak	Spacewatch	·	2.7 km	MPC; JPL
702461	2006 HT_{80}	—	April 26, 2006	Kitt Peak	Spacewatch	·	860 m	MPC; JPL
702462	2006 HM_{90}	—	April 26, 2006	Kitt Peak	Spacewatch	·	900 m	MPC; JPL
702463	2006 HD_{95}	—	February 18, 2002	Cerro Tololo	Deep Lens Survey	·	1.1 km	MPC; JPL
702464	2006 HX_{96}	—	April 30, 2006	Kitt Peak	Spacewatch	·	1.5 km	MPC; JPL
702465	2006 HF_{106}	—	April 30, 2006	Kitt Peak	Spacewatch	·	680 m	MPC; JPL
702466	2006 HV_{110}	—	April 30, 2006	Kitt Peak	Spacewatch	URS	3.3 km	MPC; JPL
702467	2006 HN_{118}	—	April 30, 2006	Kitt Peak	Spacewatch	·	2.5 km	MPC; JPL
702468	2006 HV_{125}	—	April 30, 2006	Kitt Peak	Spacewatch	·	460 m	MPC; JPL
702469	2006 HO_{130}	—	March 5, 2006	Kitt Peak	Spacewatch	·	2.0 km	MPC; JPL
702470	2006 HJ_{132}	—	December 3, 2005	Mauna Kea	A. Boattini	AST	1.4 km	MPC; JPL
702471	2006 HB_{136}	—	September 30, 2003	Kitt Peak	Spacewatch	·	1.3 km	MPC; JPL
702472	2006 HM_{141}	—	April 27, 2006	Cerro Tololo	Deep Ecliptic Survey	L5	7.6 km	MPC; JPL
702473	2006 HT_{141}	—	February 24, 2006	Kitt Peak	Spacewatch	·	1.7 km	MPC; JPL
702474	2006 HQ_{142}	—	April 27, 2006	Cerro Tololo	Deep Ecliptic Survey	·	860 m	MPC; JPL
702475	2006 HX_{145}	—	December 10, 2004	Kitt Peak	Spacewatch	·	820 m	MPC; JPL
702476	2006 HX_{147}	—	May 24, 2006	Kitt Peak	Spacewatch	·	2.3 km	MPC; JPL
702477	2006 HV_{154}	—	April 19, 2006	Mount Lemmon	Mount Lemmon Survey	·	1.2 km	MPC; JPL
702478	2006 HN_{156}	—	April 15, 2013	Haleakala	Pan-STARRS 1	·	600 m	MPC; JPL
702479	2006 HE_{157}	—	April 20, 2006	Kitt Peak	Spacewatch	·	1.3 km	MPC; JPL
702480	2006 HK_{157}	—	October 8, 2008	Kitt Peak	Spacewatch	EOS	1.6 km	MPC; JPL
702481	2006 HR_{157}	—	March 16, 2016	Mount Lemmon	Mount Lemmon Survey	·	1.7 km	MPC; JPL
702482	2006 HO_{158}	—	March 13, 2011	Kitt Peak	Spacewatch	·	1.5 km	MPC; JPL
702483	2006 HR_{159}	—	April 26, 2006	Kitt Peak	Spacewatch	·	990 m	MPC; JPL
702484	2006 JH_{4}	—	May 2, 2006	Mount Lemmon	Mount Lemmon Survey	HYG	2.4 km	MPC; JPL
702485	2006 JP_{5}	—	May 3, 2006	Mount Lemmon	Mount Lemmon Survey	EUP	2.6 km	MPC; JPL
702486	2006 JZ_{6}	—	April 8, 2006	Kitt Peak	Spacewatch	·	580 m	MPC; JPL
702487	2006 JG_{8}	—	May 1, 2006	Kitt Peak	Spacewatch	·	1.3 km	MPC; JPL
702488	2006 JS_{8}	—	May 1, 2006	Kitt Peak	Spacewatch	·	1.2 km	MPC; JPL
702489	2006 JN_{17}	—	May 2, 2006	Mount Lemmon	Mount Lemmon Survey	EOS	1.6 km	MPC; JPL
702490	2006 JQ_{19}	—	May 2, 2006	Mount Lemmon	Mount Lemmon Survey	EOS	1.7 km	MPC; JPL
702491	2006 JL_{21}	—	April 24, 2006	Kitt Peak	Spacewatch	·	3.1 km	MPC; JPL
702492	2006 JU_{21}	—	May 2, 2006	Kitt Peak	Spacewatch	·	1.1 km	MPC; JPL
702493	2006 JH_{22}	—	May 2, 2006	Kitt Peak	Spacewatch	·	2.2 km	MPC; JPL
702494	2006 JE_{24}	—	April 19, 2006	Mount Lemmon	Mount Lemmon Survey	·	540 m	MPC; JPL
702495	2006 JA_{27}	—	May 7, 2006	Kitt Peak	Spacewatch	·	1.6 km	MPC; JPL
702496	2006 JH_{27}	—	May 1, 2006	Kitt Peak	Spacewatch	·	2.7 km	MPC; JPL
702497	2006 JK_{31}	—	April 21, 2006	Kitt Peak	Spacewatch	·	1.0 km	MPC; JPL
702498	2006 JD_{33}	—	April 21, 2006	Kitt Peak	Spacewatch	·	2.7 km	MPC; JPL
702499	2006 JY_{41}	—	May 2, 2006	Mount Nyukasa	A. Nakanishi, F. Futaba	·	1.2 km	MPC; JPL
702500	2006 JD_{51}	—	May 2, 2006	Mount Lemmon	Mount Lemmon Survey	THM	1.8 km	MPC; JPL

== 702501–702600 ==
back to top

Designation			Discovery			Properties		Ref
Permanent	Provisional	Named after	Date	Site	Discoverer(s)	Category	Diam.	Ref
702501	2006 JM_{52}	—	May 5, 2006	Kitt Peak	Spacewatch	·	2.2 km	MPC; JPL
702502	2006 JC_{62}	—	May 1, 2006	Kitt Peak	Deep Ecliptic Survey	·	1.3 km	MPC; JPL
702503	2006 JZ_{65}	—	May 1, 2006	Kitt Peak	Deep Ecliptic Survey	·	2.3 km	MPC; JPL
702504	2006 JE_{69}	—	May 6, 2006	Mount Lemmon	Mount Lemmon Survey	·	1.6 km	MPC; JPL
702505	2006 JR_{72}	—	May 3, 2006	Mount Lemmon	Mount Lemmon Survey	EOS	1.6 km	MPC; JPL
702506	2006 JZ_{76}	—	October 10, 2004	Kitt Peak	Spacewatch	·	650 m	MPC; JPL
702507	2006 JL_{78}	—	May 1, 2006	Mauna Kea	P. A. Wiegert	·	2.2 km	MPC; JPL
702508	2006 JJ_{82}	—	May 1, 2006	Kitt Peak	Spacewatch	ARM	2.7 km	MPC; JPL
702509	2006 JU_{82}	—	May 23, 2012	Mount Lemmon	Mount Lemmon Survey	·	3.2 km	MPC; JPL
702510	2006 JB_{83}	—	October 8, 2012	Kitt Peak	Spacewatch	(5)	1.1 km	MPC; JPL
702511	2006 JJ_{83}	—	April 9, 2006	Kitt Peak	Spacewatch	·	1.1 km	MPC; JPL
702512	2006 JS_{83}	—	January 3, 2016	Haleakala	Pan-STARRS 1	·	2.6 km	MPC; JPL
702513	2006 JA_{84}	—	September 24, 2014	Kitt Peak	Spacewatch	·	3.4 km	MPC; JPL
702514	2006 JC_{85}	—	May 6, 2006	Mount Lemmon	Mount Lemmon Survey	·	1.5 km	MPC; JPL
702515	2006 JO_{85}	—	May 6, 2006	Mount Lemmon	Mount Lemmon Survey	·	1.3 km	MPC; JPL
702516	2006 JH_{86}	—	February 5, 2017	Haleakala	Pan-STARRS 1	·	1.7 km	MPC; JPL
702517	2006 JJ_{86}	—	February 20, 2015	Haleakala	Pan-STARRS 1	·	2.5 km	MPC; JPL
702518	2006 JS_{87}	—	October 9, 2007	Mount Lemmon	Mount Lemmon Survey	·	760 m	MPC; JPL
702519	2006 JY_{88}	—	May 8, 2006	Mount Lemmon	Mount Lemmon Survey	HYG	2.5 km	MPC; JPL
702520	2006 JF_{90}	—	May 7, 2006	Mount Lemmon	Mount Lemmon Survey	·	470 m	MPC; JPL
702521	2006 JL_{90}	—	May 6, 2006	Mount Lemmon	Mount Lemmon Survey	·	2.4 km	MPC; JPL
702522	2006 JN_{90}	—	May 6, 2006	Kitt Peak	Spacewatch	·	2.3 km	MPC; JPL
702523	2006 JV_{90}	—	May 6, 2006	Mount Lemmon	Mount Lemmon Survey	·	1.5 km	MPC; JPL
702524	2006 KM_{6}	—	May 19, 2006	Mount Lemmon	Mount Lemmon Survey	·	1.1 km	MPC; JPL
702525	2006 KZ_{6}	—	May 19, 2006	Mount Lemmon	Mount Lemmon Survey	VER	2.3 km	MPC; JPL
702526	2006 KT_{13}	—	May 20, 2006	Kitt Peak	Spacewatch	·	2.4 km	MPC; JPL
702527	2006 KU_{15}	—	May 20, 2006	Kitt Peak	Spacewatch	·	2.5 km	MPC; JPL
702528	2006 KU_{20}	—	May 19, 2006	Mount Lemmon	Mount Lemmon Survey	·	690 m	MPC; JPL
702529	2006 KV_{21}	—	May 6, 2006	Mount Lemmon	Mount Lemmon Survey	·	2.7 km	MPC; JPL
702530	2006 KH_{24}	—	May 19, 2006	Mount Lemmon	Mount Lemmon Survey	·	940 m	MPC; JPL
702531	2006 KP_{24}	—	May 19, 2006	Mount Lemmon	Mount Lemmon Survey	·	2.3 km	MPC; JPL
702532	2006 KW_{26}	—	May 20, 2006	Kitt Peak	Spacewatch	EUN	960 m	MPC; JPL
702533	2006 KN_{27}	—	April 30, 2006	Kitt Peak	Spacewatch	·	1.7 km	MPC; JPL
702534	2006 KR_{30}	—	May 20, 2006	Kitt Peak	Spacewatch	VER	2.2 km	MPC; JPL
702535	2006 KH_{32}	—	May 20, 2006	Kitt Peak	Spacewatch	·	2.5 km	MPC; JPL
702536	2006 KE_{33}	—	May 20, 2006	Kitt Peak	Spacewatch	·	2.0 km	MPC; JPL
702537	2006 KO_{35}	—	April 24, 2006	Kitt Peak	Spacewatch	·	2.7 km	MPC; JPL
702538	2006 KP_{35}	—	May 20, 2006	Kitt Peak	Spacewatch	URS	3.0 km	MPC; JPL
702539	2006 KB_{36}	—	May 20, 2006	Kitt Peak	Spacewatch	·	3.8 km	MPC; JPL
702540	2006 KS_{37}	—	May 23, 2006	Kitt Peak	Spacewatch	H	370 m	MPC; JPL
702541	2006 KB_{39}	—	May 25, 2006	Mount Lemmon	Mount Lemmon Survey	·	2.3 km	MPC; JPL
702542	2006 KO_{44}	—	May 21, 2006	Kitt Peak	Spacewatch	HNS	980 m	MPC; JPL
702543	2006 KB_{52}	—	May 21, 2006	Kitt Peak	Spacewatch	·	2.5 km	MPC; JPL
702544	2006 KH_{59}	—	May 22, 2006	Kitt Peak	Spacewatch	·	530 m	MPC; JPL
702545	2006 KP_{61}	—	May 22, 2006	Kitt Peak	Spacewatch	EOS	1.7 km	MPC; JPL
702546	2006 KC_{66}	—	May 24, 2006	Mount Lemmon	Mount Lemmon Survey	·	680 m	MPC; JPL
702547	2006 KV_{66}	—	May 24, 2006	Kitt Peak	Spacewatch	·	2.1 km	MPC; JPL
702548	2006 KX_{66}	—	September 18, 2003	Palomar	NEAT	·	800 m	MPC; JPL
702549	2006 KE_{67}	—	May 24, 2006	Mount Lemmon	Mount Lemmon Survey	·	1.5 km	MPC; JPL
702550	2006 KJ_{72}	—	May 22, 2006	Kitt Peak	Spacewatch	·	2.4 km	MPC; JPL
702551	2006 KG_{78}	—	May 24, 2006	Mount Lemmon	Mount Lemmon Survey	·	2.4 km	MPC; JPL
702552	2006 KV_{79}	—	May 25, 2006	Mount Lemmon	Mount Lemmon Survey	·	2.2 km	MPC; JPL
702553	2006 KO_{80}	—	May 25, 2006	Mount Lemmon	Mount Lemmon Survey	·	1.5 km	MPC; JPL
702554	2006 KA_{81}	—	May 25, 2006	Mount Lemmon	Mount Lemmon Survey	·	2.5 km	MPC; JPL
702555	2006 KR_{81}	—	May 25, 2006	Mount Lemmon	Mount Lemmon Survey	·	570 m	MPC; JPL
702556	2006 KB_{82}	—	May 25, 2006	Mount Lemmon	Mount Lemmon Survey	·	2.6 km	MPC; JPL
702557	2006 KZ_{84}	—	February 20, 2006	Kitt Peak	Spacewatch	·	2.1 km	MPC; JPL
702558	2006 KM_{88}	—	May 24, 2006	Kitt Peak	Spacewatch	TIR	2.2 km	MPC; JPL
702559	2006 KT_{92}	—	September 30, 2003	Kitt Peak	Spacewatch	·	610 m	MPC; JPL
702560	2006 KA_{94}	—	May 25, 2006	Kitt Peak	Spacewatch	JUN	980 m	MPC; JPL
702561	2006 KV_{97}	—	May 26, 2006	Kitt Peak	Spacewatch	·	2.8 km	MPC; JPL
702562	2006 KH_{98}	—	May 26, 2006	Kitt Peak	Spacewatch	·	3.0 km	MPC; JPL
702563	2006 KR_{98}	—	May 26, 2006	Kitt Peak	Spacewatch	·	2.1 km	MPC; JPL
702564	2006 KZ_{98}	—	May 26, 2006	Kitt Peak	Spacewatch	·	3.1 km	MPC; JPL
702565	2006 KJ_{100}	—	April 19, 2006	Kitt Peak	Spacewatch	·	1.1 km	MPC; JPL
702566	2006 KL_{101}	—	May 26, 2006	Kitt Peak	Spacewatch	·	1.3 km	MPC; JPL
702567	2006 KQ_{106}	—	May 31, 2006	Mount Lemmon	Mount Lemmon Survey	·	2.5 km	MPC; JPL
702568	2006 KU_{106}	—	May 6, 2006	Mount Lemmon	Mount Lemmon Survey	·	520 m	MPC; JPL
702569	2006 KG_{109}	—	May 6, 2006	Mount Lemmon	Mount Lemmon Survey	·	1.3 km	MPC; JPL
702570	2006 KY_{110}	—	May 31, 2006	Mount Lemmon	Mount Lemmon Survey	·	670 m	MPC; JPL
702571	2006 KC_{126}	—	May 25, 2006	Mauna Kea	P. A. Wiegert	·	1.8 km	MPC; JPL
702572	2006 KK_{131}	—	May 25, 2006	Mauna Kea	P. A. Wiegert	·	1.0 km	MPC; JPL
702573	2006 KO_{138}	—	May 23, 2006	Mount Lemmon	Mount Lemmon Survey	3:2	5.2 km	MPC; JPL
702574	2006 KX_{143}	—	May 23, 2006	Kitt Peak	Spacewatch	·	1.4 km	MPC; JPL
702575	2006 KB_{146}	—	May 21, 2006	Mount Lemmon	Mount Lemmon Survey	EUN	1.1 km	MPC; JPL
702576	2006 KP_{146}	—	May 21, 2015	Haleakala	Pan-STARRS 1	·	1.5 km	MPC; JPL
702577	2006 KQ_{146}	—	September 29, 2008	Mount Lemmon	Mount Lemmon Survey	·	2.8 km	MPC; JPL
702578	2006 KF_{147}	—	April 11, 2011	Mount Lemmon	Mount Lemmon Survey	EOS	1.8 km	MPC; JPL
702579	2006 KA_{149}	—	December 22, 2014	Haleakala	Pan-STARRS 1	H	470 m	MPC; JPL
702580	2006 KG_{149}	—	March 19, 2009	Kitt Peak	Spacewatch	·	710 m	MPC; JPL
702581	2006 KJ_{149}	—	March 7, 2016	Haleakala	Pan-STARRS 1	·	2.5 km	MPC; JPL
702582	2006 KL_{149}	—	September 14, 2013	Haleakala	Pan-STARRS 1	EOS	1.6 km	MPC; JPL
702583	2006 KQ_{149}	—	September 26, 2013	Catalina	CSS	·	2.7 km	MPC; JPL
702584	2006 KV_{149}	—	October 17, 2010	Mount Lemmon	Mount Lemmon Survey	·	600 m	MPC; JPL
702585	2006 KB_{150}	—	November 17, 2014	Haleakala	Pan-STARRS 1	·	2.3 km	MPC; JPL
702586	2006 KH_{150}	—	April 1, 2017	Haleakala	Pan-STARRS 1	·	2.3 km	MPC; JPL
702587	2006 KK_{150}	—	November 22, 2014	Haleakala	Pan-STARRS 1	T_{j} (2.97)	3.4 km	MPC; JPL
702588	2006 KY_{150}	—	October 13, 2016	Haleakala	Pan-STARRS 1	·	1.4 km	MPC; JPL
702589	2006 KH_{151}	—	May 21, 2006	Kitt Peak	Spacewatch	·	1.3 km	MPC; JPL
702590	2006 KS_{151}	—	October 9, 2007	Kitt Peak	Spacewatch	EUN	960 m	MPC; JPL
702591	2006 KO_{152}	—	November 2, 2012	Mount Lemmon	Mount Lemmon Survey	·	1.3 km	MPC; JPL
702592	2006 KU_{152}	—	October 6, 2016	Haleakala	Pan-STARRS 1	·	1.5 km	MPC; JPL
702593	2006 KF_{153}	—	November 2, 2007	Mount Lemmon	Mount Lemmon Survey	·	1.2 km	MPC; JPL
702594	2006 KP_{154}	—	May 22, 2006	Kitt Peak	Spacewatch	·	2.2 km	MPC; JPL
702595	2006 KX_{156}	—	May 30, 2006	Mount Lemmon	Mount Lemmon Survey	V	550 m	MPC; JPL
702596	2006 LX_{8}	—	February 4, 2016	Haleakala	Pan-STARRS 1	·	2.2 km	MPC; JPL
702597	2006 LY_{8}	—	November 3, 2016	Haleakala	Pan-STARRS 1	·	1.7 km	MPC; JPL
702598	2006 MP_{1}	—	June 18, 2006	Kitt Peak	Spacewatch	·	3.7 km	MPC; JPL
702599	2006 ML_{3}	—	June 3, 2006	Mount Lemmon	Mount Lemmon Survey	·	800 m	MPC; JPL
702600	2006 MQ_{8}	—	May 30, 2006	Mount Lemmon	Mount Lemmon Survey	·	900 m	MPC; JPL

== 702601–702700 ==
back to top

Designation			Discovery			Properties		Ref
Permanent	Provisional	Named after	Date	Site	Discoverer(s)	Category	Diam.	Ref
702601	2006 MC_{16}	—	August 10, 2007	Kitt Peak	Spacewatch	·	2.3 km	MPC; JPL
702602	2006 MP_{16}	—	October 13, 2016	Haleakala	Pan-STARRS 1	·	1.7 km	MPC; JPL
702603	2006 OV_{3}	—	June 11, 2006	Palomar	NEAT	PHO	1.2 km	MPC; JPL
702604	2006 OA_{17}	—	July 21, 2006	Mount Lemmon	Mount Lemmon Survey	·	880 m	MPC; JPL
702605	2006 OM_{19}	—	July 20, 2006	Siding Spring	SSS	·	820 m	MPC; JPL
702606	2006 OF_{22}	—	June 22, 2006	Kitt Peak	Spacewatch	·	2.8 km	MPC; JPL
702607	2006 OA_{26}	—	July 21, 2006	Mount Lemmon	Mount Lemmon Survey	·	1.3 km	MPC; JPL
702608	2006 OH_{27}	—	July 21, 2006	Mount Lemmon	Mount Lemmon Survey	·	1.3 km	MPC; JPL
702609	2006 OD_{33}	—	July 19, 2006	Mauna Kea	P. A. Wiegert, D. Subasinghe	SUL	1.7 km	MPC; JPL
702610	2006 OV_{37}	—	July 19, 2006	Mauna Kea	P. A. Wiegert, D. Subasinghe	·	790 m	MPC; JPL
702611	2006 OY_{37}	—	June 4, 2006	Mount Lemmon	Mount Lemmon Survey	·	620 m	MPC; JPL
702612	2006 ON_{38}	—	July 18, 2006	Mount Lemmon	Mount Lemmon Survey	·	2.0 km	MPC; JPL
702613	2006 OP_{38}	—	February 19, 2009	Kitt Peak	Spacewatch	MAS	660 m	MPC; JPL
702614	2006 OX_{39}	—	September 18, 2010	Mount Lemmon	Mount Lemmon Survey	MAS	490 m	MPC; JPL
702615	2006 OG_{40}	—	April 2, 2019	Kitt Peak	Spacewatch	·	1.4 km	MPC; JPL
702616	2006 OB_{41}	—	September 6, 2019	Haleakala	Pan-STARRS 1	L4	5.9 km	MPC; JPL
702617	2006 PE_{2}	—	August 12, 2006	Palomar	NEAT	·	660 m	MPC; JPL
702618	2006 PS_{7}	—	August 12, 2006	Palomar	NEAT	·	2.0 km	MPC; JPL
702619	2006 PX_{23}	—	August 12, 2006	Palomar	NEAT	·	1.5 km	MPC; JPL
702620	2006 PV_{31}	—	September 19, 1998	Apache Point	SDSS	·	1.0 km	MPC; JPL
702621	2006 QN_{5}	—	August 19, 2006	Kitt Peak	Spacewatch	·	1.6 km	MPC; JPL
702622	2006 QZ_{5}	—	August 19, 2006	Pla D'Arguines	R. Ferrando, Ferrando, M.	H	470 m	MPC; JPL
702623	2006 QT_{7}	—	August 19, 2006	Kitt Peak	Spacewatch	·	670 m	MPC; JPL
702624	2006 QJ_{17}	—	August 17, 2006	Palomar	NEAT	(2076)	680 m	MPC; JPL
702625	2006 QY_{17}	—	August 16, 2006	Siding Spring	SSS	·	1.2 km	MPC; JPL
702626	2006 QR_{23}	—	August 22, 2006	Palomar	NEAT	H	370 m	MPC; JPL
702627	2006 QU_{26}	—	August 19, 2006	Kitt Peak	Spacewatch	·	760 m	MPC; JPL
702628	2006 QE_{31}	—	May 23, 2001	Cerro Tololo	Deep Ecliptic Survey	H	490 m	MPC; JPL
702629	2006 QC_{39}	—	August 19, 2006	Anderson Mesa	LONEOS	·	1.9 km	MPC; JPL
702630	2006 QD_{50}	—	August 22, 2006	Palomar	NEAT	NYS	960 m	MPC; JPL
702631	2006 QV_{51}	—	August 23, 2006	Palomar	NEAT	·	610 m	MPC; JPL
702632	2006 QG_{54}	—	August 16, 2006	Siding Spring	SSS	·	3.7 km	MPC; JPL
702633	2006 QB_{62}	—	August 22, 2006	Palomar	NEAT	·	1.7 km	MPC; JPL
702634	2006 QP_{67}	—	August 21, 2006	Kitt Peak	Spacewatch	·	1.4 km	MPC; JPL
702635	2006 QS_{76}	—	August 21, 2006	Kitt Peak	Spacewatch	·	1.6 km	MPC; JPL
702636	2006 QA_{77}	—	August 21, 2006	Palomar	NEAT	PHO	710 m	MPC; JPL
702637	2006 QB_{84}	—	August 19, 2006	Kitt Peak	Spacewatch	·	1.4 km	MPC; JPL
702638	2006 QS_{87}	—	August 19, 2006	Kitt Peak	Spacewatch	AEO	960 m	MPC; JPL
702639	2006 QP_{96}	—	August 22, 2006	Palomar	NEAT	·	1.0 km	MPC; JPL
702640	2006 QR_{97}	—	August 22, 2006	Palomar	NEAT	·	1.9 km	MPC; JPL
702641	2006 QM_{105}	—	August 28, 2006	Catalina	CSS	V	510 m	MPC; JPL
702642	2006 QJ_{106}	—	June 20, 2006	Mount Lemmon	Mount Lemmon Survey	·	1.7 km	MPC; JPL
702643	2006 QA_{113}	—	August 19, 2006	Palomar	NEAT	·	710 m	MPC; JPL
702644	2006 QP_{118}	—	August 21, 2006	Kitt Peak	Spacewatch	·	1.7 km	MPC; JPL
702645	2006 QZ_{123}	—	August 29, 2006	Anderson Mesa	LONEOS	·	1.3 km	MPC; JPL
702646	2006 QR_{125}	—	August 24, 2006	Palomar	NEAT	·	830 m	MPC; JPL
702647	2006 QR_{138}	—	August 28, 2006	Siding Spring	SSS	·	1.3 km	MPC; JPL
702648	2006 QT_{138}	—	August 16, 2006	Palomar	NEAT	·	2.2 km	MPC; JPL
702649	2006 QA_{144}	—	August 29, 2006	Catalina	CSS	·	1.5 km	MPC; JPL
702650	2006 QP_{152}	—	August 19, 2006	Kitt Peak	Spacewatch	·	1.3 km	MPC; JPL
702651	2006 QN_{153}	—	August 19, 2006	Kitt Peak	Spacewatch	MAS	640 m	MPC; JPL
702652	2006 QA_{162}	—	August 20, 2006	Kitt Peak	Spacewatch	·	2.6 km	MPC; JPL
702653	2006 QD_{163}	—	August 16, 2006	Lulin	LUSS	MRX	1.1 km	MPC; JPL
702654	2006 QB_{175}	—	August 22, 2006	Cerro Tololo	Deep Ecliptic Survey	·	690 m	MPC; JPL
702655	2006 QU_{177}	—	August 21, 2006	Cerro Tololo	Wasserman, L. H.	·	1.5 km	MPC; JPL
702656	2006 QW_{178}	—	August 21, 2006	Kitt Peak	Spacewatch	AST	1.4 km	MPC; JPL
702657	2006 QE_{189}	—	August 20, 2006	Kitt Peak	Spacewatch	·	840 m	MPC; JPL
702658	2006 QF_{189}	—	January 17, 2015	Mount Lemmon	Mount Lemmon Survey	·	600 m	MPC; JPL
702659	2006 QR_{190}	—	August 8, 2013	Kitt Peak	Spacewatch	·	670 m	MPC; JPL
702660	2006 QW_{191}	—	October 19, 2010	Mount Lemmon	Mount Lemmon Survey	MAS	630 m	MPC; JPL
702661	2006 QF_{192}	—	January 18, 2009	Mount Lemmon	Mount Lemmon Survey	·	3.3 km	MPC; JPL
702662	2006 QM_{192}	—	March 15, 2013	Kitt Peak	Spacewatch	·	1.5 km	MPC; JPL
702663	2006 QQ_{192}	—	September 18, 2011	Mount Lemmon	Mount Lemmon Survey	AST	1.5 km	MPC; JPL
702664	2006 QA_{195}	—	August 19, 2006	Kitt Peak	Spacewatch	·	1.3 km	MPC; JPL
702665	2006 QB_{195}	—	August 19, 2006	Kitt Peak	Spacewatch	·	2.9 km	MPC; JPL
702666	2006 QU_{196}	—	January 23, 2013	Mount Lemmon	Mount Lemmon Survey	DOR	1.7 km	MPC; JPL
702667	2006 QF_{198}	—	October 22, 2011	Mount Lemmon	Mount Lemmon Survey	(17392)	1.2 km	MPC; JPL
702668	2006 QL_{198}	—	September 29, 2011	Mount Lemmon	Mount Lemmon Survey	·	1.6 km	MPC; JPL
702669	2006 QP_{201}	—	November 8, 2007	Kitt Peak	Spacewatch	HOF	2.1 km	MPC; JPL
702670	2006 QS_{201}	—	August 19, 2006	Kitt Peak	Spacewatch	·	1.5 km	MPC; JPL
702671	2006 QZ_{202}	—	August 19, 2006	Kitt Peak	Spacewatch	·	2.5 km	MPC; JPL
702672	2006 QA_{208}	—	August 29, 2006	Kitt Peak	Spacewatch	V	540 m	MPC; JPL
702673	2006 RM_{1}	—	September 12, 2006	Uccle	T. Pauwels	·	910 m	MPC; JPL
702674	2006 RD_{4}	—	September 12, 2006	Catalina	CSS	MIS	2.3 km	MPC; JPL
702675	2006 RN_{15}	—	September 14, 2006	Catalina	CSS	·	1.8 km	MPC; JPL
702676	2006 RS_{19}	—	August 28, 2006	Catalina	CSS	·	1.4 km	MPC; JPL
702677	2006 RR_{45}	—	September 14, 2006	Kitt Peak	Spacewatch	·	960 m	MPC; JPL
702678	2006 RT_{60}	—	September 13, 2006	Palomar	NEAT	·	960 m	MPC; JPL
702679	2006 RA_{64}	—	August 23, 2006	Palomar	NEAT	·	1.9 km	MPC; JPL
702680	2006 RD_{64}	—	August 28, 2006	Catalina	CSS	EUN	1.2 km	MPC; JPL
702681	2006 RX_{67}	—	August 28, 2006	Catalina	CSS	·	1.2 km	MPC; JPL
702682	2006 RF_{83}	—	September 15, 2006	Kitt Peak	Spacewatch	·	1.5 km	MPC; JPL
702683	2006 RK_{98}	—	September 14, 2006	Palomar	NEAT	·	2.0 km	MPC; JPL
702684	2006 RA_{104}	—	September 11, 2006	Apache Point	SDSS Collaboration	AGN	960 m	MPC; JPL
702685	2006 RO_{104}	—	October 22, 2006	Catalina	CSS	·	1.6 km	MPC; JPL
702686 Zehr	2006 RV_{105}	Zehr	September 14, 2006	Mauna Kea	Masiero, J., R. Jedicke	·	2.2 km	MPC; JPL
702687	2006 RC_{114}	—	September 14, 2006	Kitt Peak	Spacewatch	·	1.6 km	MPC; JPL
702688 Federicocolombo	2006 RF_{114}	Federicocolombo	September 14, 2006	Mauna Kea	Masiero, J., R. Jedicke	·	1.6 km	MPC; JPL
702689	2006 RN_{115}	—	September 25, 2006	Mount Lemmon	Mount Lemmon Survey	HOF	2.1 km	MPC; JPL
702690	2006 RN_{123}	—	September 14, 2012	Mount Lemmon	Mount Lemmon Survey	·	3.2 km	MPC; JPL
702691	2006 RB_{126}	—	September 15, 2006	Kitt Peak	Spacewatch	·	1.4 km	MPC; JPL
702692	2006 RD_{127}	—	September 15, 2006	Kitt Peak	Spacewatch	·	730 m	MPC; JPL
702693	2006 RT_{127}	—	September 15, 2006	Kitt Peak	Spacewatch	·	570 m	MPC; JPL
702694	2006 SV_{1}	—	August 28, 2006	Catalina	CSS	·	1.6 km	MPC; JPL
702695	2006 SO_{20}	—	September 19, 2006	Eskridge	G. Hug	NYS	850 m	MPC; JPL
702696	2006 SB_{25}	—	September 18, 2006	Kitt Peak	Spacewatch	·	1.0 km	MPC; JPL
702697	2006 SQ_{29}	—	September 17, 2006	Kitt Peak	Spacewatch	·	1.5 km	MPC; JPL
702698	2006 SW_{32}	—	September 17, 2006	Kitt Peak	Spacewatch	·	1.8 km	MPC; JPL
702699	2006 SY_{38}	—	September 18, 2006	Kitt Peak	Spacewatch	·	1.9 km	MPC; JPL
702700	2006 SD_{40}	—	September 18, 2006	Catalina	CSS	MAS	550 m	MPC; JPL

== 702701–702800 ==
back to top

Designation			Discovery			Properties		Ref
Permanent	Provisional	Named after	Date	Site	Discoverer(s)	Category	Diam.	Ref
702701	2006 SR_{48}	—	September 17, 2006	Kitt Peak	Spacewatch	(2076)	710 m	MPC; JPL
702702	2006 SP_{62}	—	September 18, 2006	Catalina	CSS	·	1.6 km	MPC; JPL
702703	2006 SW_{64}	—	September 20, 2006	Bergisch Gladbach	W. Bickel	·	1.3 km	MPC; JPL
702704	2006 SH_{71}	—	September 19, 2006	Kitt Peak	Spacewatch	·	530 m	MPC; JPL
702705	2006 SP_{76}	—	September 20, 2006	Kitt Peak	Spacewatch	·	900 m	MPC; JPL
702706	2006 SA_{81}	—	September 14, 2006	Kitt Peak	Spacewatch	·	2.5 km	MPC; JPL
702707	2006 SL_{118}	—	January 28, 2014	Mount Lemmon	Mount Lemmon Survey	·	2.0 km	MPC; JPL
702708	2006 SC_{124}	—	September 19, 2006	Catalina	CSS	·	1.8 km	MPC; JPL
702709	2006 SW_{127}	—	September 17, 2006	Catalina	CSS	PHO	930 m	MPC; JPL
702710	2006 SG_{128}	—	September 17, 2006	Anderson Mesa	LONEOS	(2076)	770 m	MPC; JPL
702711	2006 SO_{137}	—	September 20, 2006	Catalina	CSS	·	1.6 km	MPC; JPL
702712	2006 SS_{141}	—	September 25, 2006	Anderson Mesa	LONEOS	·	1.8 km	MPC; JPL
702713	2006 SF_{150}	—	September 19, 2006	Kitt Peak	Spacewatch	·	1.3 km	MPC; JPL
702714	2006 SV_{177}	—	September 25, 2006	Kitt Peak	Spacewatch	DOR	2.3 km	MPC; JPL
702715	2006 SR_{178}	—	September 25, 2006	Mount Lemmon	Mount Lemmon Survey	MAS	520 m	MPC; JPL
702716	2006 SC_{180}	—	September 25, 2006	Mount Lemmon	Mount Lemmon Survey	KOR	950 m	MPC; JPL
702717	2006 SG_{204}	—	September 25, 2006	Kitt Peak	Spacewatch	·	3.0 km	MPC; JPL
702718	2006 ST_{209}	—	September 26, 2006	Mount Lemmon	Mount Lemmon Survey	·	1.3 km	MPC; JPL
702719	2006 SG_{214}	—	September 27, 2006	Mount Lemmon	Mount Lemmon Survey	·	1.8 km	MPC; JPL
702720	2006 SQ_{221}	—	September 15, 2006	Kitt Peak	Spacewatch	·	1.1 km	MPC; JPL
702721	2006 SZ_{221}	—	September 16, 2006	Kitt Peak	Spacewatch	EOS	1.2 km	MPC; JPL
702722	2006 SU_{224}	—	September 15, 2006	Kitt Peak	Spacewatch	·	1.6 km	MPC; JPL
702723	2006 SY_{224}	—	September 26, 2006	Kitt Peak	Spacewatch	V	430 m	MPC; JPL
702724	2006 SB_{225}	—	September 26, 2006	Kitt Peak	Spacewatch	·	750 m	MPC; JPL
702725	2006 SO_{225}	—	August 29, 2006	Kitt Peak	Spacewatch	·	2.9 km	MPC; JPL
702726	2006 SG_{228}	—	September 26, 2006	Kitt Peak	Spacewatch	·	1.6 km	MPC; JPL
702727	2006 SQ_{228}	—	September 26, 2006	Kitt Peak	Spacewatch	·	1.6 km	MPC; JPL
702728	2006 SL_{229}	—	September 26, 2006	Kitt Peak	Spacewatch	·	1.5 km	MPC; JPL
702729	2006 SS_{232}	—	September 26, 2006	Kitt Peak	Spacewatch	·	880 m	MPC; JPL
702730	2006 SN_{233}	—	September 17, 2006	Kitt Peak	Spacewatch	·	1.6 km	MPC; JPL
702731	2006 SE_{244}	—	September 18, 2006	Kitt Peak	Spacewatch	·	560 m	MPC; JPL
702732	2006 SR_{247}	—	September 15, 2006	Kitt Peak	Spacewatch	·	1.7 km	MPC; JPL
702733	2006 SZ_{248}	—	September 26, 2006	Kitt Peak	Spacewatch	·	1.5 km	MPC; JPL
702734	2006 SR_{252}	—	September 26, 2006	Kitt Peak	Spacewatch	·	1.6 km	MPC; JPL
702735	2006 SD_{267}	—	September 26, 2006	Kitt Peak	Spacewatch	·	1.6 km	MPC; JPL
702736	2006 SP_{271}	—	September 18, 2006	Kitt Peak	Spacewatch	·	1.3 km	MPC; JPL
702737	2006 SN_{275}	—	September 27, 2006	Mount Lemmon	Mount Lemmon Survey	·	1.3 km	MPC; JPL
702738	2006 SE_{276}	—	September 29, 2006	Eskridge	G. Hug	EUN	1.1 km	MPC; JPL
702739	2006 SP_{276}	—	September 20, 2006	Kitt Peak	Spacewatch	NYS	970 m	MPC; JPL
702740	2006 SQ_{278}	—	September 28, 2006	Mount Lemmon	Mount Lemmon Survey	·	1.3 km	MPC; JPL
702741	2006 ST_{285}	—	September 28, 2006	Kitt Peak	Spacewatch	AGN	910 m	MPC; JPL
702742	2006 SQ_{293}	—	September 17, 2006	Kitt Peak	Spacewatch	·	3.1 km	MPC; JPL
702743	2006 SU_{294}	—	September 17, 2006	Kitt Peak	Spacewatch	·	1.6 km	MPC; JPL
702744	2006 SR_{296}	—	September 25, 2006	Kitt Peak	Spacewatch	·	1.5 km	MPC; JPL
702745	2006 SK_{299}	—	September 26, 2006	Mount Lemmon	Mount Lemmon Survey	·	850 m	MPC; JPL
702746	2006 SV_{299}	—	September 26, 2006	Mount Lemmon	Mount Lemmon Survey	MRX	830 m	MPC; JPL
702747	2006 SK_{305}	—	September 27, 2006	Kitt Peak	Spacewatch	NYS	1.2 km	MPC; JPL
702748	2006 SW_{306}	—	September 27, 2006	Kitt Peak	Spacewatch	·	1.8 km	MPC; JPL
702749	2006 SD_{309}	—	September 17, 2006	Kitt Peak	Spacewatch	·	2.3 km	MPC; JPL
702750	2006 SP_{311}	—	September 17, 2006	Kitt Peak	Spacewatch	·	1.2 km	MPC; JPL
702751	2006 SM_{315}	—	September 17, 2006	Kitt Peak	Spacewatch	·	590 m	MPC; JPL
702752	2006 SW_{317}	—	September 17, 2006	Kitt Peak	Spacewatch	·	1 km	MPC; JPL
702753	2006 SD_{325}	—	September 27, 2006	Kitt Peak	Spacewatch	·	930 m	MPC; JPL
702754	2006 SB_{327}	—	September 19, 2006	Kitt Peak	Spacewatch	NYS	840 m	MPC; JPL
702755	2006 SE_{338}	—	September 28, 2006	Kitt Peak	Spacewatch	·	1.4 km	MPC; JPL
702756	2006 SB_{339}	—	June 14, 2005	Kitt Peak	Spacewatch	·	1.4 km	MPC; JPL
702757	2006 SM_{340}	—	September 28, 2006	Kitt Peak	Spacewatch	·	1.4 km	MPC; JPL
702758	2006 SB_{346}	—	October 25, 2011	Haleakala	Pan-STARRS 1	·	1.5 km	MPC; JPL
702759	2006 SG_{358}	—	September 30, 2006	Mount Lemmon	Mount Lemmon Survey	·	1.7 km	MPC; JPL
702760	2006 SD_{359}	—	September 30, 2006	Catalina	CSS	·	1.5 km	MPC; JPL
702761	2006 SV_{374}	—	September 16, 2006	Apache Point	SDSS Collaboration	·	1.7 km	MPC; JPL
702762	2006 SF_{375}	—	September 15, 2006	Kitt Peak	Spacewatch	WIT	760 m	MPC; JPL
702763	2006 SC_{376}	—	September 17, 2006	Apache Point	SDSS Collaboration	AGN	970 m	MPC; JPL
702764	2006 SO_{376}	—	September 17, 2006	Apache Point	SDSS Collaboration	·	720 m	MPC; JPL
702765	2006 SL_{378}	—	September 18, 2006	Apache Point	SDSS Collaboration	·	1.6 km	MPC; JPL
702766	2006 SM_{379}	—	September 11, 2006	Apache Point	SDSS Collaboration	·	1.3 km	MPC; JPL
702767	2006 SD_{385}	—	October 17, 2006	Catalina	CSS	·	1.8 km	MPC; JPL
702768	2006 SK_{386}	—	November 16, 2006	Catalina	CSS	·	2.0 km	MPC; JPL
702769	2006 SO_{386}	—	September 11, 2006	Apache Point	SDSS Collaboration	·	1.4 km	MPC; JPL
702770	2006 ST_{386}	—	September 29, 2006	Apache Point	SDSS Collaboration	EUN	1.1 km	MPC; JPL
702771	2006 SJ_{388}	—	September 19, 2006	Apache Point	SDSS Collaboration	·	2.1 km	MPC; JPL
702772	2006 SQ_{395}	—	September 17, 2006	Mauna Kea	Masiero, J., R. Jedicke	·	540 m	MPC; JPL
702773	2006 SB_{404}	—	September 30, 2006	Mount Lemmon	Mount Lemmon Survey	·	3.3 km	MPC; JPL
702774	2006 SS_{414}	—	May 20, 2014	Haleakala	Pan-STARRS 1	AGN	980 m	MPC; JPL
702775	2006 SP_{419}	—	November 2, 2011	Mount Lemmon	Mount Lemmon Survey	·	1.4 km	MPC; JPL
702776	2006 SN_{422}	—	September 17, 2006	Catalina	CSS	·	1.7 km	MPC; JPL
702777	2006 SR_{422}	—	August 27, 2006	Kitt Peak	Spacewatch	·	630 m	MPC; JPL
702778	2006 ST_{422}	—	September 19, 2006	Catalina	CSS	·	1.6 km	MPC; JPL
702779	2006 SF_{423}	—	September 25, 2006	Mount Lemmon	Mount Lemmon Survey	·	1.7 km	MPC; JPL
702780	2006 SY_{423}	—	September 28, 2006	Catalina	CSS	V	610 m	MPC; JPL
702781	2006 SV_{425}	—	December 5, 2010	Mount Lemmon	Mount Lemmon Survey	·	620 m	MPC; JPL
702782	2006 SF_{426}	—	July 15, 2013	Haleakala	Pan-STARRS 1	·	770 m	MPC; JPL
702783	2006 SH_{426}	—	September 25, 2006	Kitt Peak	Spacewatch	·	1.8 km	MPC; JPL
702784	2006 SK_{426}	—	September 17, 2006	Kitt Peak	Spacewatch	·	600 m	MPC; JPL
702785	2006 SS_{427}	—	September 17, 2006	Kitt Peak	Spacewatch	·	1.6 km	MPC; JPL
702786	2006 ST_{428}	—	November 13, 2007	Mount Lemmon	Mount Lemmon Survey	·	1.6 km	MPC; JPL
702787	2006 SQ_{430}	—	February 13, 2008	Kitt Peak	Spacewatch	GEF	1.0 km	MPC; JPL
702788	2006 SA_{431}	—	September 27, 2006	Kitt Peak	Spacewatch	·	1.4 km	MPC; JPL
702789	2006 SF_{433}	—	September 15, 2006	Kitt Peak	Spacewatch	·	3.1 km	MPC; JPL
702790	2006 SN_{433}	—	September 17, 2006	Kitt Peak	Spacewatch	·	2.8 km	MPC; JPL
702791	2006 SG_{434}	—	March 4, 2016	Mount Lemmon	Mount Lemmon Survey	(260)	3.0 km	MPC; JPL
702792	2006 SW_{434}	—	September 26, 2006	Kitt Peak	Spacewatch	·	1.4 km	MPC; JPL
702793	2006 SZ_{434}	—	September 18, 2006	Kitt Peak	Spacewatch	·	1.2 km	MPC; JPL
702794	2006 SA_{435}	—	September 26, 2006	Moletai	K. Černis, Zdanavicius, J.	·	1.6 km	MPC; JPL
702795	2006 SH_{435}	—	September 19, 2006	Kitt Peak	Spacewatch	·	3.2 km	MPC; JPL
702796	2006 SJ_{435}	—	November 2, 2007	Kitt Peak	Spacewatch	·	2.5 km	MPC; JPL
702797	2006 SW_{439}	—	March 1, 2016	Mount Lemmon	Mount Lemmon Survey	·	3.2 km	MPC; JPL
702798	2006 SK_{441}	—	November 15, 2011	Mount Lemmon	Mount Lemmon Survey	·	1.3 km	MPC; JPL
702799	2006 SQ_{444}	—	July 23, 2015	Haleakala	Pan-STARRS 1	·	1.5 km	MPC; JPL
702800	2006 SX_{445}	—	September 18, 2006	Kitt Peak	Spacewatch	·	840 m	MPC; JPL

== 702801–702900 ==
back to top

Designation			Discovery			Properties		Ref
Permanent	Provisional	Named after	Date	Site	Discoverer(s)	Category	Diam.	Ref
702801	2006 SE_{447}	—	September 17, 2006	Kitt Peak	Spacewatch	HOF	1.8 km	MPC; JPL
702802	2006 SH_{447}	—	September 19, 2006	Kitt Peak	Spacewatch	·	1.6 km	MPC; JPL
702803	2006 SL_{448}	—	September 28, 2006	Catalina	CSS	·	1.9 km	MPC; JPL
702804	2006 SX_{449}	—	September 18, 2006	Catalina	CSS	·	1.7 km	MPC; JPL
702805	2006 SB_{451}	—	September 19, 2006	Kitt Peak	Spacewatch	KOR	980 m	MPC; JPL
702806	2006 SB_{452}	—	September 17, 2006	Kitt Peak	Spacewatch	·	1.6 km	MPC; JPL
702807	2006 SJ_{452}	—	September 17, 2006	Kitt Peak	Spacewatch	AGN	1.0 km	MPC; JPL
702808	2006 SN_{452}	—	September 27, 2006	Mount Lemmon	Mount Lemmon Survey	·	900 m	MPC; JPL
702809	2006 SR_{452}	—	September 30, 2006	Mount Lemmon	Mount Lemmon Survey	·	1.5 km	MPC; JPL
702810	2006 SU_{452}	—	September 28, 2006	Mount Lemmon	Mount Lemmon Survey	·	2.0 km	MPC; JPL
702811	2006 SE_{454}	—	September 25, 2006	Mount Lemmon	Mount Lemmon Survey	HOF	1.7 km	MPC; JPL
702812	2006 SP_{460}	—	September 28, 2006	Mount Lemmon	Mount Lemmon Survey	KOR	1.3 km	MPC; JPL
702813	2006 SW_{462}	—	September 26, 2006	Mount Lemmon	Mount Lemmon Survey	3:2	3.5 km	MPC; JPL
702814	2006 TC_{7}	—	September 28, 2006	Catalina	CSS	GEF	1.3 km	MPC; JPL
702815	2006 TK_{21}	—	September 17, 2006	Kitt Peak	Spacewatch	H	450 m	MPC; JPL
702816	2006 TT_{23}	—	September 30, 2006	Mount Lemmon	Mount Lemmon Survey	·	1.4 km	MPC; JPL
702817	2006 TT_{38}	—	October 12, 2006	Kitt Peak	Spacewatch	·	1.6 km	MPC; JPL
702818	2006 TP_{41}	—	October 12, 2006	Palomar	NEAT	·	790 m	MPC; JPL
702819	2006 TD_{80}	—	October 13, 2006	Kitt Peak	Spacewatch	·	3.1 km	MPC; JPL
702820	2006 TZ_{82}	—	October 13, 2006	Kitt Peak	Spacewatch	·	1.6 km	MPC; JPL
702821	2006 TX_{87}	—	October 13, 2006	Kitt Peak	Spacewatch	·	1.8 km	MPC; JPL
702822	2006 TB_{88}	—	October 13, 2006	Kitt Peak	Spacewatch	·	2.0 km	MPC; JPL
702823	2006 TD_{94}	—	September 15, 2006	Kitt Peak	Spacewatch	·	1.4 km	MPC; JPL
702824	2006 TQ_{104}	—	October 2, 2006	Mount Lemmon	Mount Lemmon Survey	·	1.8 km	MPC; JPL
702825	2006 TA_{114}	—	October 1, 2006	Apache Point	SDSS Collaboration	·	1.3 km	MPC; JPL
702826	2006 TD_{114}	—	October 1, 2006	Apache Point	SDSS Collaboration	·	2.4 km	MPC; JPL
702827	2006 TT_{117}	—	September 19, 2006	Catalina	CSS	·	1.4 km	MPC; JPL
702828	2006 TG_{131}	—	October 2, 2006	Mount Lemmon	Mount Lemmon Survey	HOF	2.0 km	MPC; JPL
702829	2006 TJ_{131}	—	October 3, 2006	Mount Lemmon	Mount Lemmon Survey	WIT	800 m	MPC; JPL
702830	2006 TD_{134}	—	October 11, 2006	Palomar	NEAT	·	620 m	MPC; JPL
702831	2006 TJ_{134}	—	October 11, 2006	Palomar	NEAT	BAP	800 m	MPC; JPL
702832	2006 TT_{134}	—	October 2, 2006	Mount Lemmon	Mount Lemmon Survey	NYS	640 m	MPC; JPL
702833	2006 TX_{134}	—	October 31, 2010	Mount Lemmon	Mount Lemmon Survey	HNS	970 m	MPC; JPL
702834	2006 TS_{135}	—	October 4, 2006	Mount Lemmon	Mount Lemmon Survey	·	830 m	MPC; JPL
702835	2006 TL_{137}	—	October 1, 2006	Kitt Peak	Spacewatch	AGN	900 m	MPC; JPL
702836	2006 TY_{137}	—	October 24, 2011	Haleakala	Pan-STARRS 1	·	1.3 km	MPC; JPL
702837	2006 TQ_{139}	—	October 2, 2006	Mount Lemmon	Mount Lemmon Survey	·	1.5 km	MPC; JPL
702838	2006 TJ_{141}	—	September 19, 2006	Kitt Peak	Spacewatch	MRX	730 m	MPC; JPL
702839	2006 TE_{142}	—	October 2, 2006	Mount Lemmon	Mount Lemmon Survey	AGN	1.0 km	MPC; JPL
702840	2006 TS_{144}	—	October 1, 2006	Piszkéstető	K. Sárneczky	NAE	1.5 km	MPC; JPL
702841	2006 TH_{145}	—	October 2, 2006	Mount Lemmon	Mount Lemmon Survey	·	1.6 km	MPC; JPL
702842	2006 UF_{15}	—	October 17, 2006	Mount Lemmon	Mount Lemmon Survey	·	1.1 km	MPC; JPL
702843	2006 UB_{19}	—	October 16, 2006	Kitt Peak	Spacewatch	·	1.2 km	MPC; JPL
702844	2006 UQ_{23}	—	October 3, 2006	Kitt Peak	Spacewatch	·	1.5 km	MPC; JPL
702845	2006 UT_{23}	—	September 25, 2006	Kitt Peak	Spacewatch	·	2.2 km	MPC; JPL
702846	2006 UH_{25}	—	September 26, 2006	Mount Lemmon	Mount Lemmon Survey	AGN	940 m	MPC; JPL
702847	2006 UK_{44}	—	October 16, 2006	Kitt Peak	Spacewatch	·	1.0 km	MPC; JPL
702848	2006 UX_{50}	—	September 30, 2006	Kitt Peak	Spacewatch	·	1.7 km	MPC; JPL
702849	2006 UO_{55}	—	October 18, 2006	Kitt Peak	Spacewatch	GEF	1.1 km	MPC; JPL
702850	2006 UQ_{56}	—	October 18, 2006	Kitt Peak	Spacewatch	·	1.6 km	MPC; JPL
702851	2006 UK_{60}	—	September 26, 2006	Kitt Peak	Spacewatch	·	1.3 km	MPC; JPL
702852	2006 UD_{72}	—	October 17, 2006	Kitt Peak	Spacewatch	·	1 km	MPC; JPL
702853	2006 UE_{78}	—	September 26, 2006	Mount Lemmon	Mount Lemmon Survey	PHO	950 m	MPC; JPL
702854	2006 UQ_{91}	—	January 5, 2003	Socorro	LINEAR	·	1.6 km	MPC; JPL
702855	2006 UU_{91}	—	October 18, 2006	Kitt Peak	Spacewatch	·	1.6 km	MPC; JPL
702856	2006 UZ_{102}	—	October 18, 2006	Kitt Peak	Spacewatch	·	1.5 km	MPC; JPL
702857	2006 UE_{105}	—	October 18, 2006	Kitt Peak	Spacewatch	·	830 m	MPC; JPL
702858	2006 UU_{107}	—	October 18, 2006	Kitt Peak	Spacewatch	HNS	1.1 km	MPC; JPL
702859	2006 UM_{108}	—	October 18, 2006	Kitt Peak	Spacewatch	·	1.7 km	MPC; JPL
702860	2006 UA_{114}	—	September 18, 2006	Kitt Peak	Spacewatch	·	730 m	MPC; JPL
702861	2006 UT_{116}	—	October 19, 2006	Kitt Peak	Spacewatch	H	300 m	MPC; JPL
702862	2006 UE_{120}	—	October 19, 2006	Kitt Peak	Spacewatch	·	1.9 km	MPC; JPL
702863	2006 UU_{122}	—	September 27, 2006	Kitt Peak	Spacewatch	·	1.5 km	MPC; JPL
702864	2006 UY_{123}	—	October 19, 2006	Kitt Peak	Spacewatch	·	740 m	MPC; JPL
702865	2006 UH_{126}	—	October 2, 2006	Mount Lemmon	Mount Lemmon Survey	AEO	1.0 km	MPC; JPL
702866	2006 UQ_{126}	—	September 28, 2006	Mount Lemmon	Mount Lemmon Survey	·	1.4 km	MPC; JPL
702867	2006 UU_{126}	—	October 2, 2006	Mount Lemmon	Mount Lemmon Survey	AEO	960 m	MPC; JPL
702868	2006 UK_{134}	—	September 19, 1998	Apache Point	SDSS Collaboration	·	1.0 km	MPC; JPL
702869	2006 UO_{141}	—	October 19, 2006	Kitt Peak	Spacewatch	·	1.6 km	MPC; JPL
702870	2006 UA_{143}	—	October 4, 2006	Mount Lemmon	Mount Lemmon Survey	·	1.4 km	MPC; JPL
702871	2006 UQ_{144}	—	October 20, 2006	Kitt Peak	Spacewatch	·	580 m	MPC; JPL
702872	2006 UX_{145}	—	September 17, 2006	Catalina	CSS	·	1.6 km	MPC; JPL
702873	2006 UW_{147}	—	September 26, 1995	Kitt Peak	Spacewatch	MAS	550 m	MPC; JPL
702874	2006 UD_{155}	—	September 14, 2006	Kitt Peak	Spacewatch	·	1.9 km	MPC; JPL
702875	2006 UH_{156}	—	October 2, 2006	Mount Lemmon	Mount Lemmon Survey	·	620 m	MPC; JPL
702876	2006 UY_{157}	—	October 21, 2006	Mount Lemmon	Mount Lemmon Survey	·	610 m	MPC; JPL
702877	2006 UQ_{158}	—	October 21, 2006	Mount Lemmon	Mount Lemmon Survey	·	1.9 km	MPC; JPL
702878	2006 US_{158}	—	October 21, 2006	Mount Lemmon	Mount Lemmon Survey	·	1.2 km	MPC; JPL
702879	2006 UA_{160}	—	September 19, 2006	Kitt Peak	Spacewatch	WIT	740 m	MPC; JPL
702880	2006 UW_{193}	—	October 20, 2006	Kitt Peak	Spacewatch	·	1.5 km	MPC; JPL
702881	2006 UV_{195}	—	September 19, 2006	Kitt Peak	Spacewatch	·	1.4 km	MPC; JPL
702882	2006 UY_{195}	—	October 4, 2006	Mount Lemmon	Mount Lemmon Survey	H	370 m	MPC; JPL
702883	2006 UM_{203}	—	October 11, 2006	Palomar	NEAT	·	1.9 km	MPC; JPL
702884	2006 UJ_{204}	—	October 23, 2006	Catalina	CSS	JUN	930 m	MPC; JPL
702885	2006 UU_{205}	—	September 19, 2006	Kitt Peak	Spacewatch	·	1.4 km	MPC; JPL
702886	2006 UX_{205}	—	October 23, 2006	Kitt Peak	Spacewatch	·	1.6 km	MPC; JPL
702887	2006 UE_{208}	—	October 23, 2006	Kitt Peak	Spacewatch	KOR	1.1 km	MPC; JPL
702888	2006 UF_{216}	—	September 28, 2006	Mount Lemmon	Mount Lemmon Survey	·	1.4 km	MPC; JPL
702889	2006 UC_{217}	—	October 29, 2006	Wildberg	R. Apitzsch	·	1.3 km	MPC; JPL
702890	2006 UD_{238}	—	October 23, 2006	Kitt Peak	Spacewatch	KOR	1.0 km	MPC; JPL
702891	2006 UF_{242}	—	October 16, 2006	Kitt Peak	Spacewatch	·	1.2 km	MPC; JPL
702892	2006 UW_{244}	—	October 27, 2006	Mount Lemmon	Mount Lemmon Survey	KON	1.8 km	MPC; JPL
702893	2006 UG_{251}	—	October 27, 2006	Mount Lemmon	Mount Lemmon Survey	KOR	1.1 km	MPC; JPL
702894	2006 UL_{251}	—	October 27, 2006	Mount Lemmon	Mount Lemmon Survey	MAR	740 m	MPC; JPL
702895	2006 UQ_{260}	—	October 20, 2006	Kitt Peak	Spacewatch	·	1.3 km	MPC; JPL
702896	2006 UA_{264}	—	October 17, 2006	Catalina	CSS	·	810 m	MPC; JPL
702897	2006 UB_{279}	—	October 28, 2006	Mount Lemmon	Mount Lemmon Survey	AGN	1.0 km	MPC; JPL
702898	2006 UZ_{280}	—	October 12, 2006	Kitt Peak	Spacewatch	·	2.2 km	MPC; JPL
702899	2006 UH_{308}	—	September 30, 2006	Mount Lemmon	Mount Lemmon Survey	·	1.7 km	MPC; JPL
702900	2006 UR_{309}	—	October 19, 2006	Kitt Peak	Deep Ecliptic Survey	·	1.2 km	MPC; JPL

== 702901–703000 ==
back to top

Designation			Discovery			Properties		Ref
Permanent	Provisional	Named after	Date	Site	Discoverer(s)	Category	Diam.	Ref
702901	2006 UT_{313}	—	October 19, 2006	Kitt Peak	Deep Ecliptic Survey	·	890 m	MPC; JPL
702902	2006 UW_{317}	—	November 15, 2006	Kitt Peak	Spacewatch	·	540 m	MPC; JPL
702903	2006 UH_{330}	—	September 28, 2006	Kitt Peak	Spacewatch	VER	2.0 km	MPC; JPL
702904	2006 UP_{333}	—	October 22, 2006	Apache Point	SDSS Collaboration	·	2.3 km	MPC; JPL
702905	2006 UO_{339}	—	October 26, 2006	Mauna Kea	P. A. Wiegert	·	1.2 km	MPC; JPL
702906	2006 UO_{363}	—	October 17, 2006	Kitt Peak	Spacewatch	MAR	930 m	MPC; JPL
702907	2006 UX_{363}	—	October 19, 2006	Mount Lemmon	Mount Lemmon Survey	·	1.5 km	MPC; JPL
702908	2006 UZ_{363}	—	October 20, 2006	Mount Lemmon	Mount Lemmon Survey	BRA	1.3 km	MPC; JPL
702909	2006 US_{364}	—	October 22, 2006	Mount Lemmon	Mount Lemmon Survey	·	1 km	MPC; JPL
702910	2006 UW_{364}	—	October 22, 2006	Catalina	CSS	HNS	1.3 km	MPC; JPL
702911	2006 UA_{366}	—	February 12, 2011	Mount Lemmon	Mount Lemmon Survey	(2076)	660 m	MPC; JPL
702912	2006 UE_{368}	—	October 20, 2006	Mount Lemmon	Mount Lemmon Survey	·	1.7 km	MPC; JPL
702913	2006 US_{368}	—	February 28, 2008	Kitt Peak	Spacewatch	·	1 km	MPC; JPL
702914	2006 UV_{368}	—	October 13, 2006	Kitt Peak	Spacewatch	·	1.5 km	MPC; JPL
702915	2006 UZ_{368}	—	October 19, 2006	Kitt Peak	Spacewatch	·	2.2 km	MPC; JPL
702916	2006 UL_{370}	—	March 7, 2013	Nogales	M. Schwartz, P. R. Holvorcem	JUN	1.0 km	MPC; JPL
702917	2006 UH_{374}	—	October 23, 2006	Mount Lemmon	Mount Lemmon Survey	HOF	2.4 km	MPC; JPL
702918	2006 UO_{375}	—	July 13, 2013	Haleakala	Pan-STARRS 1	NYS	870 m	MPC; JPL
702919	2006 UU_{375}	—	October 22, 2006	Mount Lemmon	Mount Lemmon Survey	·	2.4 km	MPC; JPL
702920	2006 UG_{377}	—	October 24, 2015	Mount Lemmon	Mount Lemmon Survey	·	1.7 km	MPC; JPL
702921	2006 UY_{378}	—	October 21, 2006	Mount Lemmon	Mount Lemmon Survey	·	1.4 km	MPC; JPL
702922	2006 UK_{380}	—	October 20, 2006	Mount Lemmon	Mount Lemmon Survey	·	3.0 km	MPC; JPL
702923	2006 UZ_{381}	—	October 28, 2006	Kitt Peak	Spacewatch	·	1.3 km	MPC; JPL
702924	2006 US_{382}	—	October 22, 2006	Kitt Peak	Spacewatch	·	840 m	MPC; JPL
702925	2006 UA_{391}	—	October 20, 2006	Kitt Peak	Spacewatch	·	1.3 km	MPC; JPL
702926	2006 US_{391}	—	October 22, 2006	Catalina	CSS	·	1.0 km	MPC; JPL
702927	2006 UK_{395}	—	October 19, 2006	Kitt Peak	Spacewatch	·	1.1 km	MPC; JPL
702928	2006 VW_{4}	—	November 10, 2006	Kitt Peak	Spacewatch	NYS	850 m	MPC; JPL
702929	2006 VG_{11}	—	October 20, 2006	Kitt Peak	Spacewatch	·	1.1 km	MPC; JPL
702930	2006 VH_{31}	—	September 30, 2006	Mount Lemmon	Mount Lemmon Survey	KOR	1.2 km	MPC; JPL
702931	2006 VT_{39}	—	November 1, 2006	Kitt Peak	Spacewatch	·	1.7 km	MPC; JPL
702932	2006 VN_{40}	—	October 12, 2006	Kitt Peak	Spacewatch	·	1.4 km	MPC; JPL
702933	2006 VK_{47}	—	November 9, 2006	Kitt Peak	Spacewatch	·	1.7 km	MPC; JPL
702934	2006 VD_{57}	—	October 21, 2006	Mount Lemmon	Mount Lemmon Survey	·	2.0 km	MPC; JPL
702935	2006 VN_{59}	—	October 21, 2006	Mount Lemmon	Mount Lemmon Survey	·	1.6 km	MPC; JPL
702936	2006 VN_{66}	—	November 11, 2006	Catalina	CSS	MAS	650 m	MPC; JPL
702937	2006 VP_{72}	—	October 28, 2006	Mount Lemmon	Mount Lemmon Survey	V	490 m	MPC; JPL
702938	2006 VO_{74}	—	November 11, 2006	Mount Lemmon	Mount Lemmon Survey	·	900 m	MPC; JPL
702939	2006 VY_{78}	—	November 12, 2006	Mount Lemmon	Mount Lemmon Survey	KOR	1.1 km	MPC; JPL
702940	2006 VC_{82}	—	November 13, 2006	Kitt Peak	Spacewatch	·	1.7 km	MPC; JPL
702941	2006 VY_{87}	—	November 14, 2006	Mount Lemmon	Mount Lemmon Survey	·	3.2 km	MPC; JPL
702942	2006 VA_{93}	—	October 23, 2006	Mount Lemmon	Mount Lemmon Survey	·	1.7 km	MPC; JPL
702943	2006 VS_{95}	—	October 31, 2006	Kitt Peak	Spacewatch	·	1.6 km	MPC; JPL
702944	2006 VM_{97}	—	November 11, 2006	Kitt Peak	Spacewatch	·	1.7 km	MPC; JPL
702945	2006 VF_{100}	—	September 18, 2006	Catalina	CSS	·	1.4 km	MPC; JPL
702946	2006 VH_{100}	—	October 21, 2006	Mount Lemmon	Mount Lemmon Survey	·	850 m	MPC; JPL
702947	2006 VJ_{118}	—	September 28, 2006	Mount Lemmon	Mount Lemmon Survey	BRA	1.4 km	MPC; JPL
702948	2006 VM_{122}	—	November 14, 2006	Kitt Peak	Spacewatch	·	1.1 km	MPC; JPL
702949	2006 VO_{126}	—	October 20, 2006	Kitt Peak	Spacewatch	·	1.8 km	MPC; JPL
702950	2006 VQ_{132}	—	November 15, 2006	Kitt Peak	Spacewatch	·	1.6 km	MPC; JPL
702951	2006 VV_{148}	—	September 27, 2006	Mount Lemmon	Mount Lemmon Survey	NYS	1.0 km	MPC; JPL
702952	2006 VG_{154}	—	October 17, 2006	Kitt Peak	Spacewatch	(13314)	1.6 km	MPC; JPL
702953	2006 VO_{173}	—	November 12, 2006	Mount Lemmon	Mount Lemmon Survey	EUN	820 m	MPC; JPL
702954	2006 VP_{177}	—	November 18, 2006	Mount Lemmon	Mount Lemmon Survey	·	1.8 km	MPC; JPL
702955	2006 VU_{177}	—	October 20, 2012	Kitt Peak	Spacewatch	·	2.8 km	MPC; JPL
702956	2006 VD_{180}	—	November 12, 2006	Mount Lemmon	Mount Lemmon Survey	·	1.6 km	MPC; JPL
702957	2006 VZ_{180}	—	June 26, 2015	Haleakala	Pan-STARRS 1	·	1.2 km	MPC; JPL
702958	2006 VP_{182}	—	November 15, 2006	Mount Lemmon	Mount Lemmon Survey	·	1.6 km	MPC; JPL
702959	2006 VH_{186}	—	November 12, 2006	Mount Lemmon	Mount Lemmon Survey	KOR	980 m	MPC; JPL
702960	2006 WQ	—	November 16, 2006	Kitt Peak	Spacewatch	PHO	810 m	MPC; JPL
702961 Tamineilson	2006 WZ	Tamineilson	November 18, 2006	Nogales	J.-C. Merlin	·	870 m	MPC; JPL
702962	2006 WH_{6}	—	November 16, 2006	Kitt Peak	Spacewatch	·	1.7 km	MPC; JPL
702963	2006 WZ_{9}	—	November 16, 2006	Mount Lemmon	Mount Lemmon Survey	·	1.0 km	MPC; JPL
702964	2006 WJ_{13}	—	November 16, 2006	Mount Lemmon	Mount Lemmon Survey	·	1.8 km	MPC; JPL
702965	2006 WG_{22}	—	November 17, 2006	Mount Lemmon	Mount Lemmon Survey	·	1.5 km	MPC; JPL
702966	2006 WC_{32}	—	October 4, 2006	Mount Lemmon	Mount Lemmon Survey	·	890 m	MPC; JPL
702967	2006 WC_{35}	—	September 28, 2006	Mount Lemmon	Mount Lemmon Survey	·	2.6 km	MPC; JPL
702968	2006 WK_{35}	—	November 16, 2006	Kitt Peak	Spacewatch	·	1.4 km	MPC; JPL
702969	2006 WA_{42}	—	September 1, 2010	Mount Lemmon	Mount Lemmon Survey	HOF	1.9 km	MPC; JPL
702970	2006 WH_{46}	—	November 16, 2006	Kitt Peak	Spacewatch	·	1.7 km	MPC; JPL
702971	2006 WJ_{52}	—	November 16, 2006	Kitt Peak	Spacewatch	·	1.7 km	MPC; JPL
702972	2006 WN_{54}	—	November 16, 2006	Kitt Peak	Spacewatch	·	1.1 km	MPC; JPL
702973	2006 WJ_{68}	—	November 17, 2006	Mount Lemmon	Mount Lemmon Survey	VER	2.4 km	MPC; JPL
702974	2006 WC_{72}	—	September 27, 2006	Mount Lemmon	Mount Lemmon Survey	NYS	920 m	MPC; JPL
702975	2006 WU_{76}	—	November 18, 2006	Kitt Peak	Spacewatch	AST	1.4 km	MPC; JPL
702976	2006 WD_{86}	—	November 18, 2006	Kitt Peak	Spacewatch	SYL	3.9 km	MPC; JPL
702977	2006 WC_{92}	—	October 4, 2006	Mount Lemmon	Mount Lemmon Survey	·	1.8 km	MPC; JPL
702978	2006 WY_{92}	—	November 19, 2006	Kitt Peak	Spacewatch	HOF	2.3 km	MPC; JPL
702979	2006 WF_{93}	—	November 19, 2006	Kitt Peak	Spacewatch	·	550 m	MPC; JPL
702980	2006 WB_{95}	—	November 11, 2006	Kitt Peak	Spacewatch	BRA	1.4 km	MPC; JPL
702981	2006 WW_{96}	—	November 19, 2006	Kitt Peak	Spacewatch	·	2.5 km	MPC; JPL
702982	2006 WV_{102}	—	November 19, 2006	Kitt Peak	Spacewatch	KOR	1.1 km	MPC; JPL
702983	2006 WG_{106}	—	November 11, 2006	Kitt Peak	Spacewatch	EUN	1.1 km	MPC; JPL
702984	2006 WC_{107}	—	July 21, 2006	Mount Lemmon	Mount Lemmon Survey	·	630 m	MPC; JPL
702985	2006 WL_{122}	—	November 21, 2006	Mount Lemmon	Mount Lemmon Survey	·	700 m	MPC; JPL
702986	2006 WH_{135}	—	November 18, 2006	Mount Lemmon	Mount Lemmon Survey	·	520 m	MPC; JPL
702987	2006 WN_{135}	—	November 18, 2006	Mount Lemmon	Mount Lemmon Survey	·	1.9 km	MPC; JPL
702988	2006 WD_{151}	—	October 16, 2006	Kitt Peak	Spacewatch	KOR	1.2 km	MPC; JPL
702989	2006 WC_{155}	—	September 28, 2006	Mount Lemmon	Mount Lemmon Survey	·	1.7 km	MPC; JPL
702990	2006 WZ_{157}	—	November 22, 2006	Kitt Peak	Spacewatch	·	780 m	MPC; JPL
702991	2006 WE_{166}	—	November 23, 2006	Kitt Peak	Spacewatch	KOR	1.0 km	MPC; JPL
702992	2006 WM_{174}	—	November 23, 2006	Kitt Peak	Spacewatch	PAD	1.4 km	MPC; JPL
702993	2006 WP_{175}	—	November 23, 2006	Mount Lemmon	Mount Lemmon Survey	·	1.4 km	MPC; JPL
702994	2006 WD_{209}	—	November 21, 2006	Mount Lemmon	Mount Lemmon Survey	·	1.7 km	MPC; JPL
702995	2006 WD_{210}	—	September 8, 2011	Kitt Peak	Spacewatch	·	2.5 km	MPC; JPL
702996	2006 WK_{210}	—	November 25, 2006	Mount Lemmon	Mount Lemmon Survey	V	560 m	MPC; JPL
702997	2006 WG_{213}	—	September 14, 2013	Mount Lemmon	Mount Lemmon Survey	·	1.0 km	MPC; JPL
702998	2006 WA_{217}	—	September 28, 2006	Catalina	CSS	EUN	1.5 km	MPC; JPL
702999	2006 WH_{217}	—	November 17, 2006	Catalina	CSS	·	1.7 km	MPC; JPL
703000	2006 WW_{217}	—	June 7, 2011	Mount Lemmon	Mount Lemmon Survey	H	580 m	MPC; JPL

back to top

== Meaning of names ==
As minor planet discoveries are confirmed, they are given a permanent number by the IAU's Minor Planet Center (MPC), and the discoverers can then submit names for them, following the IAU's naming conventions. The list below concerns those minor planets in the specified number-range that have received names, and explains the meanings of those names.

Official naming citations of newly named small Solar System bodies are approved and published in a bulletin by IAU's Working Group for Small Bodies Nomenclature (WGSBN). Before May 2021, citations were published in MPC's Minor Planet Circulars for many decades. Recent citations can also be found on the JPL Small-Body Database (SBDB). Until his death in 2016, German astronomer Lutz D. Schmadel compiled these citations into the Dictionary of Minor Planet Names (DMP) and regularly updated the collection.

Based on Paul Herget's The Names of the Minor Planets, Schmadel also researched the unclear origin of numerous asteroids, most of which had been named prior to World War II. This article incorporates text from this source, which is in the public domain: SBDB New namings may only be added to this list below after official publication as the preannouncement of names is condemned. The WGSBN publishes a comprehensive guideline for the naming rules of non-cometary small Solar System bodies.

Named minor planet	Provisional	This minor planet was named for...	Ref; Catalog
702686 Zehr	2006 RV_{105}	Larry Daniel Zehr, retired Canadian entrepreneur, amateur astronomer and photographer.	IAU · 702686
702688 Federicocolombo	2006 RF_{114}	Federico Colombo, Italian neurosurgeon, and a pioneer in radiosurgery and neurosurgery.	IAU · 702688
702961 Tamineilson	2006 WZ	Tamara "Tami" Neilson, Canadian country and soul singer, songwriter.	IAU · 702961
