= List of minor planets: 671001–672000 =

The following is a partial list of minor planets, running from minor-planet number 671001 through 672000, inclusive. The primary data for this and other partial lists is based on JPL's "Small-Body Orbital Elements" and data available from the Minor Planet Center. Critical list information is also provided by the MPC, unless otherwise specified from Lowell Observatory. A detailed description of the table's columns and additional sources are given on the main page including a complete list of every page in this series, and a statistical break-up on the dynamical classification of minor planets.

Also see the summary list of all named bodies in numerical and alphabetical order, and the corresponding naming citations for the number range of this particular list. New namings may only be added to this list after official publication, as the preannouncement of names is condemned by the Working Group for Small Bodies Nomenclature of the International Astronomical Union.

Near-Earth obj.	MBA (inner)	MBA (outer)	Centaur
Mars-crosser	MBA (middle)	Jupiter trojan	Trans-Neptunian obj.
Unclassified

== 671001–671100 ==
Designation			Discovery			Properties		Ref
Permanent	Provisional	Named after	Date	Site	Discoverer(s)	Category	Diam.	Ref
671001	2014 EV_{51}	—	February 10, 2014	Haleakala	Pan-STARRS 1	·	2.0 km	MPC · JPL
671002	2014 EC_{52}	—	March 11, 2014	Catalina	CSS	H	510 m	MPC · JPL
671003	2014 EM_{52}	—	April 10, 2010	Kitt Peak	Spacewatch	EUN	920 m	MPC · JPL
671004	2014 EY_{53}	—	June 13, 2015	Haleakala	Pan-STARRS 1	EUN	900 m	MPC · JPL
671005	2014 EA_{60}	—	September 15, 2012	Kitt Peak	Spacewatch	·	540 m	MPC · JPL
671006	2014 EM_{60}	—	October 25, 2009	Kitt Peak	Spacewatch	·	430 m	MPC · JPL
671007	2014 EQ_{62}	—	January 17, 2013	Mount Lemmon	Mount Lemmon Survey	·	2.4 km	MPC · JPL
671008	2014 EG_{68}	—	November 8, 2009	Kitt Peak	Spacewatch	L4	7.9 km	MPC · JPL
671009	2014 ET_{68}	—	May 25, 2006	Mount Lemmon	Mount Lemmon Survey	·	1.7 km	MPC · JPL
671010	2014 EQ_{72}	—	September 24, 2017	Haleakala	Pan-STARRS 1	·	1.8 km	MPC · JPL
671011	2014 EV_{72}	—	March 22, 2009	Mount Lemmon	Mount Lemmon Survey	EOS	1.5 km	MPC · JPL
671012	2014 EZ_{73}	—	January 3, 2014	Mount Lemmon	Mount Lemmon Survey	·	1.7 km	MPC · JPL
671013	2014 ES_{74}	—	May 21, 2015	Cerro Tololo	DECam	·	1.6 km	MPC · JPL
671014	2014 EU_{89}	—	August 14, 2016	Haleakala	Pan-STARRS 1	·	1.5 km	MPC · JPL
671015	2014 EF_{98}	—	September 24, 2008	Kitt Peak	Spacewatch	·	1.3 km	MPC · JPL
671016	2014 EQ_{99}	—	November 16, 2006	Kitt Peak	Spacewatch	·	600 m	MPC · JPL
671017	2014 ED_{101}	—	September 22, 2009	Mount Lemmon	Mount Lemmon Survey	L4	7.9 km	MPC · JPL
671018	2014 EV_{105}	—	August 3, 2016	Haleakala	Pan-STARRS 1	·	1.3 km	MPC · JPL
671019	2014 EQ_{108}	—	September 20, 2009	Kitt Peak	Spacewatch	L4	6.2 km	MPC · JPL
671020	2014 EU_{113}	—	October 22, 2012	Haleakala	Pan-STARRS 1	·	580 m	MPC · JPL
671021	2014 EP_{114}	—	November 24, 2009	Kitt Peak	Spacewatch	·	640 m	MPC · JPL
671022	2014 ET_{114}	—	July 12, 2016	Haleakala	Pan-STARRS 1	·	1.4 km	MPC · JPL
671023	2014 EC_{116}	—	March 3, 2014	Cerro Tololo-DECam	DECam	L4	6.5 km	MPC · JPL
671024	2014 EK_{118}	—	March 3, 2014	Cerro Tololo	DECam	L4	6.3 km	MPC · JPL
671025	2014 ET_{118}	—	November 10, 2010	Mount Lemmon	Mount Lemmon Survey	L4	5.7 km	MPC · JPL
671026	2014 EU_{120}	—	September 23, 2005	Kitt Peak	Spacewatch	·	610 m	MPC · JPL
671027	2014 EF_{131}	—	September 23, 2011	Kitt Peak	Spacewatch	·	1.6 km	MPC · JPL
671028	2014 EX_{132}	—	October 6, 2016	Mount Lemmon	Mount Lemmon Survey	·	1.4 km	MPC · JPL
671029	2014 EB_{137}	—	August 2, 2008	Charleston	R. Holmes	·	590 m	MPC · JPL
671030	2014 EH_{143}	—	September 24, 2017	Haleakala	Pan-STARRS 1	·	1.6 km	MPC · JPL
671031	2014 EB_{150}	—	April 25, 2015	Haleakala	Pan-STARRS 1	EOS	1.4 km	MPC · JPL
671032	2014 EZ_{155}	—	March 11, 2005	Mount Lemmon	Mount Lemmon Survey	WIT	1.0 km	MPC · JPL
671033	2014 EN_{166}	—	February 28, 2014	Haleakala	Pan-STARRS 1	EOS	1.4 km	MPC · JPL
671034	2014 EW_{183}	—	March 4, 2014	Cerro Tololo-DECam	DECam	·	1.3 km	MPC · JPL
671035	2014 EN_{184}	—	May 18, 2015	Haleakala	Pan-STARRS 1	·	1.8 km	MPC · JPL
671036	2014 EB_{188}	—	March 4, 2014	Cerro Tololo	DECam	L4	5.7 km	MPC · JPL
671037	2014 EQ_{195}	—	February 28, 2014	Haleakala	Pan-STARRS 1	·	2.1 km	MPC · JPL
671038	2014 EO_{205}	—	July 7, 2016	Haleakala	Pan-STARRS 1	·	1.7 km	MPC · JPL
671039	2014 EM_{219}	—	July 29, 2008	Mount Lemmon	Mount Lemmon Survey	L4	8.9 km	MPC · JPL
671040	2014 EQ_{220}	—	August 26, 2016	Haleakala	Pan-STARRS 1	·	1.5 km	MPC · JPL
671041	2014 EY_{222}	—	September 1, 2005	Kitt Peak	Spacewatch	·	630 m	MPC · JPL
671042	2014 ES_{223}	—	September 6, 2016	Mount Lemmon	Mount Lemmon Survey	·	2.5 km	MPC · JPL
671043	2014 ER_{225}	—	September 19, 2011	Haleakala	Pan-STARRS 1	VER	2.0 km	MPC · JPL
671044	2014 EO_{231}	—	September 29, 2011	Mount Lemmon	Mount Lemmon Survey	EOS	1.6 km	MPC · JPL
671045	2014 ED_{233}	—	September 27, 2011	Mount Lemmon	Mount Lemmon Survey	·	3.0 km	MPC · JPL
671046	2014 EQ_{239}	—	September 4, 2016	Mount Lemmon	Mount Lemmon Survey	EUN	1.1 km	MPC · JPL
671047	2014 EG_{244}	—	February 21, 2009	Kitt Peak	Spacewatch	·	2.0 km	MPC · JPL
671048	2014 EC_{246}	—	November 14, 2012	Mount Lemmon	Mount Lemmon Survey	·	1.3 km	MPC · JPL
671049	2014 EY_{249}	—	March 9, 2014	Haleakala	Pan-STARRS 1	WIT	1.1 km	MPC · JPL
671050	2014 EF_{250}	—	March 13, 2014	Mount Lemmon	Mount Lemmon Survey	·	1.7 km	MPC · JPL
671051	2014 ES_{252}	—	December 31, 2008	Kitt Peak	Spacewatch	·	1.7 km	MPC · JPL
671052	2014 EO_{255}	—	March 3, 2014	Oukaïmeden	M. Ory	·	540 m	MPC · JPL
671053	2014 EL_{256}	—	March 8, 2014	Mount Lemmon	Mount Lemmon Survey	EOS	1.6 km	MPC · JPL
671054	2014 EO_{256}	—	March 5, 2014	Haleakala	Pan-STARRS 1	·	1.6 km	MPC · JPL
671055	2014 FT_{4}	—	January 22, 2013	Mount Lemmon	Mount Lemmon Survey	L4	7.0 km	MPC · JPL
671056	2014 FU_{4}	—	September 27, 2009	Mount Lemmon	Mount Lemmon Survey	L4	6.0 km	MPC · JPL
671057	2014 FL_{6}	—	March 22, 2014	Mount Lemmon	Mount Lemmon Survey	·	1.5 km	MPC · JPL
671058	2014 FK_{7}	—	April 17, 2009	Mount Lemmon	Mount Lemmon Survey	H	500 m	MPC · JPL
671059	2014 FE_{10}	—	February 28, 2009	Kitt Peak	Spacewatch	KOR	1.4 km	MPC · JPL
671060	2014 FY_{11}	—	March 20, 2014	Mount Lemmon	Mount Lemmon Survey	MAR	970 m	MPC · JPL
671061	2014 FW_{12}	—	October 23, 2011	Mount Lemmon	Mount Lemmon Survey	·	1.5 km	MPC · JPL
671062	2014 FX_{12}	—	February 26, 2014	Haleakala	Pan-STARRS 1	·	1.6 km	MPC · JPL
671063	2014 FR_{13}	—	September 30, 2008	Mount Lemmon	Mount Lemmon Survey	·	1.4 km	MPC · JPL
671064	2014 FD_{14}	—	November 16, 1995	Kitt Peak	Spacewatch	·	1.7 km	MPC · JPL
671065	2014 FK_{14}	—	February 27, 2014	Kitt Peak	Spacewatch	·	600 m	MPC · JPL
671066	2014 FT_{15}	—	March 13, 2014	Kitt Peak	Spacewatch	·	520 m	MPC · JPL
671067	2014 FE_{25}	—	December 31, 2007	Kitt Peak	Spacewatch	·	2.4 km	MPC · JPL
671068	2014 FW_{28}	—	February 28, 2014	Haleakala	Pan-STARRS 1	·	1.4 km	MPC · JPL
671069	2014 FE_{31}	—	January 27, 2007	Mount Lemmon	Mount Lemmon Survey	·	380 m	MPC · JPL
671070	2014 FD_{38}	—	March 27, 2014	Catalina	CSS	H	440 m	MPC · JPL
671071	2014 FF_{38}	—	March 27, 2014	Mount Lemmon	Mount Lemmon Survey	H	390 m	MPC · JPL
671072	2014 FA_{39}	—	February 19, 2009	Kitt Peak	Spacewatch	·	1.3 km	MPC · JPL
671073	2014 FT_{43}	—	November 27, 2010	Mount Lemmon	Mount Lemmon Survey	L4	6.2 km	MPC · JPL
671074	2014 FN_{45}	—	March 25, 2014	Haleakala	Pan-STARRS 1	EOS	1.6 km	MPC · JPL
671075	2014 FJ_{46}	—	March 12, 2014	Mount Lemmon	Mount Lemmon Survey	·	2.1 km	MPC · JPL
671076	2014 FP_{47}	—	March 30, 2014	Catalina	CSS	APO · fast	120 m	MPC · JPL
671077	2014 FQ_{49}	—	March 25, 2014	Catalina	CSS	·	590 m	MPC · JPL
671078	2014 FC_{58}	—	November 26, 2012	Mount Lemmon	Mount Lemmon Survey	·	1.3 km	MPC · JPL
671079	2014 FY_{62}	—	February 4, 2005	Catalina	CSS	·	2.4 km	MPC · JPL
671080	2014 FJ_{63}	—	October 18, 2012	Haleakala	Pan-STARRS 1	·	690 m	MPC · JPL
671081	2014 FY_{63}	—	June 7, 2011	Kitt Peak	Spacewatch	·	640 m	MPC · JPL
671082	2014 FU_{64}	—	February 26, 2014	Haleakala	Pan-STARRS 1	H	400 m	MPC · JPL
671083	2014 FA_{65}	—	June 24, 2011	Mount Lemmon	Mount Lemmon Survey	·	610 m	MPC · JPL
671084	2014 FZ_{65}	—	August 13, 2004	Palomar	NEAT	TIR	2.7 km	MPC · JPL
671085	2014 FK_{66}	—	September 18, 2007	Siding Spring	SSS	H	480 m	MPC · JPL
671086	2014 FT_{68}	—	February 28, 2014	Haleakala	Pan-STARRS 1	·	1.9 km	MPC · JPL
671087	2014 FY_{71}	—	March 28, 2014	Cerro Tololo	S. S. Sheppard, C. A. Trujillo	cubewano (hot)	408 km	MPC · JPL
671088	2014 FB_{72}	—	January 10, 2002	Palomar	NEAT	centaur	105 km	MPC · JPL
671089	2014 FF_{73}	—	March 27, 2014	Haleakala	Pan-STARRS 1	·	1.4 km	MPC · JPL
671090	2014 FE_{77}	—	May 25, 2009	Kitt Peak	Spacewatch	·	2.1 km	MPC · JPL
671091	2014 FF_{77}	—	January 20, 2008	Mount Lemmon	Mount Lemmon Survey	·	1.8 km	MPC · JPL
671092	2014 FJ_{77}	—	September 22, 2016	Mount Lemmon	Mount Lemmon Survey	·	1.7 km	MPC · JPL
671093	2014 FS_{77}	—	March 25, 2014	Kitt Peak	Spacewatch	·	540 m	MPC · JPL
671094	2014 FB_{78}	—	March 22, 2014	Piszkés-tető	K. Sárneczky, T. Szalai	PHO	790 m	MPC · JPL
671095	2014 FF_{79}	—	October 30, 2016	Catalina	CSS	MAR	960 m	MPC · JPL
671096	2014 FN_{79}	—	March 26, 2014	Mount Lemmon	Mount Lemmon Survey	·	1.5 km	MPC · JPL
671097	2014 FL_{80}	—	March 26, 2014	Mount Lemmon	Mount Lemmon Survey	EOS	1.4 km	MPC · JPL
671098	2014 FH_{81}	—	March 24, 2014	Haleakala	Pan-STARRS 1	·	570 m	MPC · JPL
671099	2014 FP_{84}	—	March 28, 2014	Mount Lemmon	Mount Lemmon Survey	EOS	1.5 km	MPC · JPL
671100	2014 FO_{89}	—	March 24, 2014	Haleakala	Pan-STARRS 1	EOS	1.4 km	MPC · JPL

== 671101–671200 ==
back to top

Designation			Discovery			Properties		Ref
Permanent	Provisional	Named after	Date	Site	Discoverer(s)	Category	Diam.	Ref
671101	2014 GO_{1}	—	October 6, 2002	Haleakala	NEAT	H	470 m	MPC · JPL
671102	2014 GL_{7}	—	April 1, 2014	Mount Lemmon	Mount Lemmon Survey	·	680 m	MPC · JPL
671103	2014 GK_{11}	—	November 12, 2012	Mount Lemmon	Mount Lemmon Survey	·	550 m	MPC · JPL
671104	2014 GP_{12}	—	April 7, 2007	Mount Lemmon	Mount Lemmon Survey	PHO	650 m	MPC · JPL
671105	2014 GC_{16}	—	January 31, 2009	Mount Lemmon	Mount Lemmon Survey	·	2.1 km	MPC · JPL
671106	2014 GM_{16}	—	January 10, 2014	Haleakala	Pan-STARRS 1	·	1.7 km	MPC · JPL
671107	2014 GY_{16}	—	April 3, 2014	Elena Remote	Oreshko, A.	GAL	1.2 km	MPC · JPL
671108	2014 GK_{20}	—	April 4, 2014	Mount Lemmon	Mount Lemmon Survey	·	1.7 km	MPC · JPL
671109	2014 GM_{21}	—	April 21, 2009	Kitt Peak	Spacewatch	EOS	1.5 km	MPC · JPL
671110	2014 GX_{24}	—	March 29, 2014	Mayhill-ISON	L. Elenin	·	1.3 km	MPC · JPL
671111	2014 GN_{25}	—	October 9, 2007	Kitt Peak	Spacewatch	·	1.7 km	MPC · JPL
671112	2014 GW_{25}	—	April 4, 2014	Kitt Peak	Spacewatch	·	650 m	MPC · JPL
671113	2014 GN_{27}	—	May 31, 2008	Kitt Peak	Spacewatch	·	1.1 km	MPC · JPL
671114	2014 GJ_{28}	—	March 27, 2014	Haleakala	Pan-STARRS 1	·	540 m	MPC · JPL
671115	2014 GF_{30}	—	April 4, 2014	Haleakala	Pan-STARRS 1	·	1.3 km	MPC · JPL
671116	2014 GD_{32}	—	May 4, 2001	Palomar	NEAT	·	2.1 km	MPC · JPL
671117	2014 GQ_{32}	—	April 2, 2014	Kitt Peak	Spacewatch	H	350 m	MPC · JPL
671118	2014 GV_{32}	—	October 20, 2003	Socorro	LINEAR	·	1.6 km	MPC · JPL
671119	2014 GL_{42}	—	December 26, 2009	Kitt Peak	Spacewatch	·	880 m	MPC · JPL
671120	2014 GU_{43}	—	March 8, 2014	Mount Lemmon	Mount Lemmon Survey	·	1.9 km	MPC · JPL
671121	2014 GD_{48}	—	April 7, 2014	Mount Lemmon	Mount Lemmon Survey	·	1.5 km	MPC · JPL
671122	2014 GK_{48}	—	March 10, 2014	Mount Lemmon	Mount Lemmon Survey	·	2.1 km	MPC · JPL
671123	2014 GZ_{48}	—	March 25, 2014	Haleakala	Pan-STARRS 1	H	390 m	MPC · JPL
671124	2014 GY_{49}	—	May 25, 2009	Palomar	Palomar Transient Factory	H	450 m	MPC · JPL
671125	2014 GL_{50}	—	April 5, 2014	Haleakala	Pan-STARRS 1	·	3.0 km	MPC · JPL
671126	2014 GG_{51}	—	November 13, 2007	Mount Lemmon	Mount Lemmon Survey	·	2.0 km	MPC · JPL
671127	2014 GX_{54}	—	October 6, 2012	Haleakala	Pan-STARRS 1	H	370 m	MPC · JPL
671128	2014 GL_{55}	—	April 4, 2014	Haleakala	Pan-STARRS 1	·	2.2 km	MPC · JPL
671129	2014 GB_{60}	—	December 1, 2003	Kitt Peak	Spacewatch	·	1.1 km	MPC · JPL
671130	2014 GP_{61}	—	April 5, 2014	Haleakala	Pan-STARRS 1	·	1.1 km	MPC · JPL
671131	2014 GA_{62}	—	April 4, 2014	Kitt Peak	Spacewatch	·	2.0 km	MPC · JPL
671132	2014 GF_{62}	—	April 5, 2014	Haleakala	Pan-STARRS 1	·	1.5 km	MPC · JPL
671133	2014 GJ_{62}	—	April 2, 2014	Mount Lemmon	Mount Lemmon Survey	·	1.1 km	MPC · JPL
671134	2014 GN_{63}	—	April 5, 2014	Haleakala	Pan-STARRS 1	EOS	1.4 km	MPC · JPL
671135	2014 GE_{64}	—	December 12, 2012	Mount Lemmon	Mount Lemmon Survey	·	2.3 km	MPC · JPL
671136	2014 GU_{64}	—	April 24, 2009	Kitt Peak	Spacewatch	·	3.0 km	MPC · JPL
671137	2014 GD_{65}	—	April 14, 2010	Mount Lemmon	Mount Lemmon Survey	HNS	1.3 km	MPC · JPL
671138	2014 GR_{65}	—	April 5, 2014	Haleakala	Pan-STARRS 1	·	580 m	MPC · JPL
671139	2014 GY_{65}	—	June 20, 2006	Mount Lemmon	Mount Lemmon Survey	·	1.3 km	MPC · JPL
671140	2014 GB_{66}	—	April 6, 2014	Mount Lemmon	Mount Lemmon Survey	·	1.7 km	MPC · JPL
671141	2014 GQ_{66}	—	April 5, 2014	Haleakala	Pan-STARRS 1	·	580 m	MPC · JPL
671142	2014 GV_{66}	—	January 5, 2013	Cerro Tololo-DECam	DECam	PHO	950 m	MPC · JPL
671143	2014 GF_{69}	—	April 5, 2014	Haleakala	Pan-STARRS 1	·	470 m	MPC · JPL
671144	2014 GX_{69}	—	April 4, 2014	Mount Lemmon	Mount Lemmon Survey	·	1.2 km	MPC · JPL
671145	2014 GQ_{70}	—	April 10, 2014	Haleakala	Pan-STARRS 1	·	550 m	MPC · JPL
671146	2014 GA_{72}	—	April 5, 2014	Haleakala	Pan-STARRS 1	L4	6.9 km	MPC · JPL
671147	2014 GB_{72}	—	April 5, 2014	Haleakala	Pan-STARRS 1	THM	1.7 km	MPC · JPL
671148	2014 GJ_{73}	—	April 5, 2014	Haleakala	Pan-STARRS 1	V	320 m	MPC · JPL
671149	2014 GP_{74}	—	April 5, 2014	Haleakala	Pan-STARRS 1	THM	1.9 km	MPC · JPL
671150	2014 GQ_{74}	—	April 5, 2014	Haleakala	Pan-STARRS 1	TEL	1.1 km	MPC · JPL
671151	2014 GR_{77}	—	April 1, 2003	Apache Point	SDSS Collaboration	·	2.3 km	MPC · JPL
671152	2014 GL_{79}	—	April 4, 2014	Kitt Peak	Spacewatch	H	320 m	MPC · JPL
671153	2014 GN_{80}	—	April 1, 2014	Mount Lemmon	Mount Lemmon Survey	EOS	1.5 km	MPC · JPL
671154	2014 GJ_{83}	—	April 5, 2014	Haleakala	Pan-STARRS 1	·	610 m	MPC · JPL
671155	2014 GN_{83}	—	April 5, 2014	Haleakala	Pan-STARRS 1	·	400 m	MPC · JPL
671156	2014 GP_{84}	—	April 9, 2014	Haleakala	Pan-STARRS 1	·	690 m	MPC · JPL
671157	2014 GV_{86}	—	April 7, 2014	Mount Lemmon	Mount Lemmon Survey	·	1.8 km	MPC · JPL
671158	2014 GY_{86}	—	April 4, 2014	Mount Lemmon	Mount Lemmon Survey	EOS	1.7 km	MPC · JPL
671159	2014 GX_{89}	—	April 5, 2014	Haleakala	Pan-STARRS 1	EOS	1.4 km	MPC · JPL
671160	2014 HR_{2}	—	April 4, 2014	XuYi	PMO NEO Survey Program	H	610 m	MPC · JPL
671161	2014 HB_{4}	—	April 22, 2014	Mount Lemmon	Mount Lemmon Survey	PHO	1.0 km	MPC · JPL
671162	2014 HU_{6}	—	April 4, 2014	Haleakala	Pan-STARRS 1	·	2.1 km	MPC · JPL
671163	2014 HW_{6}	—	April 6, 2014	Mount Lemmon	Mount Lemmon Survey	EOS	1.3 km	MPC · JPL
671164	2014 HG_{8}	—	September 27, 2003	Kitt Peak	Spacewatch	RAF	900 m	MPC · JPL
671165	2014 HH_{8}	—	January 4, 2013	Cerro Tololo-DECam	DECam	·	1.6 km	MPC · JPL
671166	2014 HR_{9}	—	October 26, 2011	Kitt Peak	Spacewatch	·	2.3 km	MPC · JPL
671167	2014 HS_{10}	—	April 4, 2005	Mount Lemmon	Mount Lemmon Survey	·	1.9 km	MPC · JPL
671168	2014 HH_{11}	—	September 22, 2011	Mount Lemmon	Mount Lemmon Survey	·	2.0 km	MPC · JPL
671169	2014 HR_{11}	—	February 27, 2014	Kitt Peak	Spacewatch	·	660 m	MPC · JPL
671170	2014 HW_{12}	—	April 5, 2014	Haleakala	Pan-STARRS 1	·	420 m	MPC · JPL
671171	2014 HG_{16}	—	April 21, 2014	Mount Lemmon	Mount Lemmon Survey	·	1.5 km	MPC · JPL
671172	2014 HA_{21}	—	April 5, 2014	Haleakala	Pan-STARRS 1	·	1.6 km	MPC · JPL
671173	2014 HC_{21}	—	April 5, 2014	Haleakala	Pan-STARRS 1	·	470 m	MPC · JPL
671174	2014 HM_{21}	—	February 26, 2009	Mount Lemmon	Mount Lemmon Survey	·	1.5 km	MPC · JPL
671175	2014 HJ_{24}	—	March 30, 2003	Kitt Peak	Deep Ecliptic Survey	·	3.5 km	MPC · JPL
671176	2014 HY_{25}	—	December 17, 2012	Nogales	M. Schwartz, P. R. Holvorcem	·	1.3 km	MPC · JPL
671177	2014 HF_{26}	—	April 5, 2014	Haleakala	Pan-STARRS 1	·	1.6 km	MPC · JPL
671178	2014 HE_{30}	—	April 4, 2014	Haleakala	Pan-STARRS 1	·	550 m	MPC · JPL
671179	2014 HR_{30}	—	April 24, 2014	Mount Lemmon	Mount Lemmon Survey	EOS	1.5 km	MPC · JPL
671180	2014 HN_{31}	—	April 6, 2014	Mount Lemmon	Mount Lemmon Survey	·	560 m	MPC · JPL
671181	2014 HC_{35}	—	August 21, 2006	Kitt Peak	Spacewatch	·	1.8 km	MPC · JPL
671182	2014 HE_{37}	—	September 8, 2011	Haleakala	Pan-STARRS 1	BRA	1.7 km	MPC · JPL
671183	2014 HG_{39}	—	April 24, 2014	Mount Lemmon	Mount Lemmon Survey	V	380 m	MPC · JPL
671184	2014 HC_{41}	—	April 20, 2007	Saint-Sulpice	B. Christophe	·	630 m	MPC · JPL
671185	2014 HR_{41}	—	September 22, 2011	Kitt Peak	Spacewatch	·	2.0 km	MPC · JPL
671186	2014 HF_{42}	—	April 5, 2014	Haleakala	Pan-STARRS 1	NYS	740 m	MPC · JPL
671187	2014 HG_{44}	—	October 19, 2011	Mount Lemmon	Mount Lemmon Survey	·	1.8 km	MPC · JPL
671188	2014 HT_{44}	—	April 24, 2014	Haleakala	Pan-STARRS 1	·	1.4 km	MPC · JPL
671189	2014 HM_{45}	—	March 25, 2014	Mount Lemmon	Mount Lemmon Survey	·	2.5 km	MPC · JPL
671190	2014 HJ_{46}	—	April 23, 2014	Mount Lemmon	Mount Lemmon Survey	H	530 m	MPC · JPL
671191	2014 HP_{46}	—	May 19, 2009	Marly	P. Kocher	H	540 m	MPC · JPL
671192	2014 HR_{46}	—	October 30, 2007	Catalina	CSS	H	430 m	MPC · JPL
671193	2014 HR_{49}	—	October 20, 2011	Mount Lemmon	Mount Lemmon Survey	·	2.0 km	MPC · JPL
671194	2014 HS_{68}	—	April 5, 2014	Haleakala	Pan-STARRS 1	·	1.0 km	MPC · JPL
671195	2014 HZ_{73}	—	December 10, 2012	Haleakala	Pan-STARRS 1	·	670 m	MPC · JPL
671196	2014 HC_{76}	—	April 23, 2014	Cerro Tololo-DECam	DECam	·	580 m	MPC · JPL
671197	2014 HX_{81}	—	April 20, 2014	Mount Lemmon	Mount Lemmon Survey	·	970 m	MPC · JPL
671198	2014 HG_{87}	—	April 23, 2014	Cerro Tololo-DECam	DECam	EOS	1.4 km	MPC · JPL
671199	2014 HU_{87}	—	March 25, 2014	Kitt Peak	Spacewatch	·	480 m	MPC · JPL
671200	2014 HN_{91}	—	April 23, 2014	Cerro Tololo-DECam	DECam	·	1.3 km	MPC · JPL

== 671201–671300 ==
back to top

Designation			Discovery			Properties		Ref
Permanent	Provisional	Named after	Date	Site	Discoverer(s)	Category	Diam.	Ref
671201	2014 HB_{92}	—	April 20, 2014	Mount Lemmon	Mount Lemmon Survey	EOS	1.4 km	MPC · JPL
671202	2014 HF_{93}	—	April 23, 2014	Cerro Tololo-DECam	DECam	·	710 m	MPC · JPL
671203	2014 HV_{98}	—	April 21, 2009	Bergisch Gladbach	W. Bickel	HOF	3.2 km	MPC · JPL
671204	2014 HP_{99}	—	April 23, 2014	Cerro Tololo-DECam	DECam	·	1.1 km	MPC · JPL
671205	2014 HB_{103}	—	April 23, 2014	Cerro Tololo-DECam	DECam	·	2.1 km	MPC · JPL
671206	2014 HF_{111}	—	April 23, 2014	Cerro Tololo-DECam	DECam	·	720 m	MPC · JPL
671207	2014 HX_{114}	—	April 24, 2014	Mount Lemmon	Mount Lemmon Survey	EOS	1.6 km	MPC · JPL
671208	2014 HF_{115}	—	February 16, 2010	Kitt Peak	Spacewatch	·	720 m	MPC · JPL
671209	2014 HX_{115}	—	April 23, 2014	Cerro Tololo-DECam	DECam	·	2.5 km	MPC · JPL
671210	2014 HE_{116}	—	April 23, 2014	Cerro Tololo-DECam	DECam	·	2.0 km	MPC · JPL
671211	2014 HB_{118}	—	October 27, 2011	Mount Lemmon	Mount Lemmon Survey	·	2.1 km	MPC · JPL
671212	2014 HF_{123}	—	April 5, 2014	Haleakala	Pan-STARRS 1	H	370 m	MPC · JPL
671213	2014 HG_{128}	—	April 5, 2014	Haleakala	Pan-STARRS 1	·	2.1 km	MPC · JPL
671214	2014 HQ_{128}	—	April 4, 2014	Haleakala	Pan-STARRS 1	·	670 m	MPC · JPL
671215	2014 HY_{129}	—	April 23, 2014	Cerro Tololo-DECam	DECam	·	560 m	MPC · JPL
671216	2014 HY_{130}	—	March 31, 2014	Kitt Peak	Spacewatch	·	1.8 km	MPC · JPL
671217	2014 HK_{132}	—	April 18, 2007	Kitt Peak	Spacewatch	·	620 m	MPC · JPL
671218	2014 HH_{134}	—	September 9, 2007	Mount Lemmon	Mount Lemmon Survey	·	1.4 km	MPC · JPL
671219	2014 HQ_{138}	—	September 21, 2011	Kitt Peak	Spacewatch	·	2.6 km	MPC · JPL
671220	2014 HC_{140}	—	April 5, 2014	Haleakala	Pan-STARRS 1	·	2.1 km	MPC · JPL
671221	2014 HV_{140}	—	October 26, 2011	Haleakala	Pan-STARRS 1	·	1.8 km	MPC · JPL
671222	2014 HV_{146}	—	November 23, 2003	Kitt Peak	Spacewatch	·	1.7 km	MPC · JPL
671223	2014 HD_{148}	—	September 20, 2011	Kitt Peak	Spacewatch	AGN	1.2 km	MPC · JPL
671224	2014 HB_{149}	—	August 29, 2011	La Sagra	OAM	JUN	960 m	MPC · JPL
671225	2014 HJ_{153}	—	October 30, 2011	Mount Lemmon	Mount Lemmon Survey	·	3.1 km	MPC · JPL
671226	2014 HL_{159}	—	April 24, 2014	Mount Lemmon	Mount Lemmon Survey	·	2.6 km	MPC · JPL
671227	2014 HL_{160}	—	October 20, 2012	Haleakala	Pan-STARRS 1	V	510 m	MPC · JPL
671228	2014 HH_{162}	—	April 25, 2014	Mount Lemmon	Mount Lemmon Survey	·	1.8 km	MPC · JPL
671229	2014 HB_{163}	—	April 24, 2014	Mount Lemmon	Mount Lemmon Survey	·	1.8 km	MPC · JPL
671230	2014 HC_{164}	—	April 28, 2014	Haleakala	Pan-STARRS 1	MAR	1.1 km	MPC · JPL
671231	2014 HK_{167}	—	April 1, 2003	Apache Point	SDSS Collaboration	·	2.2 km	MPC · JPL
671232	2014 HK_{168}	—	April 25, 2014	Mount Lemmon	Mount Lemmon Survey	·	650 m	MPC · JPL
671233	2014 HW_{169}	—	September 19, 1998	Apache Point	SDSS Collaboration	·	1.6 km	MPC · JPL
671234	2014 HY_{169}	—	March 24, 2014	Haleakala	Pan-STARRS 1	·	580 m	MPC · JPL
671235	2014 HD_{171}	—	December 30, 1999	Mauna Kea	C. Veillet, I. Gable	·	1.6 km	MPC · JPL
671236	2014 HZ_{174}	—	April 29, 2014	Haleakala	Pan-STARRS 1	·	530 m	MPC · JPL
671237	2014 HA_{175}	—	January 10, 2013	Haleakala	Pan-STARRS 1	EOS	1.5 km	MPC · JPL
671238	2014 HM_{175}	—	January 15, 2007	Mauna Kea	P. A. Wiegert	·	1.4 km	MPC · JPL
671239	2014 HF_{179}	—	April 24, 2014	Kitt Peak	Spacewatch	·	2.9 km	MPC · JPL
671240	2014 HO_{180}	—	May 3, 2009	Cerro Burek	Burek, Cerro	H	430 m	MPC · JPL
671241	2014 HA_{181}	—	March 6, 2008	Mount Lemmon	Mount Lemmon Survey	·	2.3 km	MPC · JPL
671242	2014 HM_{182}	—	April 4, 2014	Mount Lemmon	Mount Lemmon Survey	·	2.0 km	MPC · JPL
671243	2014 HR_{184}	—	May 2, 2014	ESA OGS	ESA OGS	APO	350 m	MPC · JPL
671244	2014 HK_{186}	—	April 29, 2014	Haleakala	Pan-STARRS 1	·	590 m	MPC · JPL
671245	2014 HW_{186}	—	May 3, 2014	Mount Lemmon	Mount Lemmon Survey	·	1.8 km	MPC · JPL
671246	2014 HD_{187}	—	April 30, 2014	Haleakala	Pan-STARRS 1	·	2.6 km	MPC · JPL
671247	2014 HU_{189}	—	June 11, 2004	Kitt Peak	Spacewatch	·	480 m	MPC · JPL
671248	2014 HP_{191}	—	May 11, 2005	Palomar	NEAT	·	1.8 km	MPC · JPL
671249	2014 HR_{194}	—	January 4, 2013	Cerro Tololo-DECam	DECam	EUN	1.3 km	MPC · JPL
671250	2014 HO_{195}	—	March 28, 2014	Haleakala	Pan-STARRS 1	H	430 m	MPC · JPL
671251	2014 HB_{204}	—	April 30, 2014	Haleakala	Pan-STARRS 1	·	2.1 km	MPC · JPL
671252	2014 HD_{206}	—	October 1, 2010	Mount Lemmon	Mount Lemmon Survey	·	1.3 km	MPC · JPL
671253	2014 HV_{207}	—	April 30, 2014	Haleakala	Pan-STARRS 1	·	2.3 km	MPC · JPL
671254	2014 HD_{208}	—	October 1, 2010	Mount Lemmon	Mount Lemmon Survey	·	1.6 km	MPC · JPL
671255	2014 HE_{212}	—	April 30, 2014	Haleakala	Pan-STARRS 1	·	450 m	MPC · JPL
671256	2014 HB_{213}	—	April 30, 2014	Haleakala	Pan-STARRS 1	·	1.9 km	MPC · JPL
671257	2014 HF_{214}	—	April 30, 2014	Haleakala	Pan-STARRS 1	·	620 m	MPC · JPL
671258	2014 HL_{216}	—	April 30, 2014	Haleakala	Pan-STARRS 1	·	1.4 km	MPC · JPL
671259	2014 HB_{222}	—	April 23, 2014	Mount Lemmon	Mount Lemmon Survey	·	560 m	MPC · JPL
671260	2014 HP_{222}	—	April 28, 2014	Haleakala	Pan-STARRS 1	·	2.3 km	MPC · JPL
671261	2014 HM_{223}	—	April 29, 2014	Haleakala	Pan-STARRS 1	·	500 m	MPC · JPL
671262	2014 HU_{227}	—	April 30, 2014	Haleakala	Pan-STARRS 1	·	620 m	MPC · JPL
671263	2014 HC_{237}	—	April 29, 2014	Haleakala	Pan-STARRS 1	·	1.8 km	MPC · JPL
671264	2014 HL_{256}	—	April 25, 2014	Cerro Tololo	DECam	V	470 m	MPC · JPL
671265	2014 HC_{257}	—	October 24, 2011	Haleakala	Pan-STARRS 1	·	2.0 km	MPC · JPL
671266	2014 HX_{288}	—	April 25, 2014	Cerro Tololo	DECam	·	730 m	MPC · JPL
671267	2014 HU_{293}	—	April 29, 2014	Cerro Tololo-DECam	DECam	·	2.4 km	MPC · JPL
671268	2014 HJ_{296}	—	May 21, 2014	Haleakala	Pan-STARRS 1	·	2.1 km	MPC · JPL
671269	2014 HK_{297}	—	October 10, 2015	Haleakala	Pan-STARRS 1	·	760 m	MPC · JPL
671270	2014 HU_{307}	—	April 24, 2014	Cerro Tololo-DECam	DECam	EMA	2.0 km	MPC · JPL
671271 Richardadsouza	2014 HJ_{308}	Richardadsouza	November 24, 2012	Mount Graham	K. Černis, R. P. Boyle	·	1.9 km	MPC · JPL
671272	2014 JC	—	December 30, 2010	Črni Vrh	Matičič, S.	H	610 m	MPC · JPL
671273	2014 JE_{1}	—	April 5, 2014	Haleakala	Pan-STARRS 1	·	1.8 km	MPC · JPL
671274	2014 JX_{1}	—	March 8, 2014	Mount Lemmon	Mount Lemmon Survey	·	1.3 km	MPC · JPL
671275	2014 JH_{2}	—	May 2, 2014	Mount Lemmon	Mount Lemmon Survey	·	2.8 km	MPC · JPL
671276	2014 JR_{3}	—	May 1, 2014	Mount Lemmon	Mount Lemmon Survey	·	680 m	MPC · JPL
671277	2014 JB_{5}	—	October 18, 2012	Haleakala	Pan-STARRS 1	MAS	490 m	MPC · JPL
671278	2014 JS_{5}	—	November 18, 2011	Mount Lemmon	Mount Lemmon Survey	·	2.1 km	MPC · JPL
671279	2014 JL_{8}	—	February 28, 2014	Haleakala	Pan-STARRS 1	·	2.2 km	MPC · JPL
671280	2014 JY_{9}	—	May 3, 2014	Mount Lemmon	Mount Lemmon Survey	·	2.0 km	MPC · JPL
671281	2014 JH_{10}	—	April 3, 2014	XuYi	PMO NEO Survey Program	·	2.2 km	MPC · JPL
671282	2014 JT_{12}	—	April 25, 2014	Mount Lemmon	Mount Lemmon Survey	·	1.2 km	MPC · JPL
671283	2014 JZ_{12}	—	July 5, 2011	Haleakala	Pan-STARRS 1	·	1.9 km	MPC · JPL
671284	2014 JX_{13}	—	January 24, 2007	Mount Lemmon	Mount Lemmon Survey	·	2.5 km	MPC · JPL
671285	2014 JA_{15}	—	April 30, 2014	Haleakala	Pan-STARRS 1	H	460 m	MPC · JPL
671286	2014 JR_{15}	—	November 8, 2010	Mauna Kea	Forshay, P., M. Micheli	·	2.1 km	MPC · JPL
671287	2014 JA_{16}	—	March 23, 2014	Kitt Peak	Spacewatch	·	1.5 km	MPC · JPL
671288	2014 JS_{20}	—	April 30, 2006	Kitt Peak	Spacewatch	·	980 m	MPC · JPL
671289	2014 JX_{20}	—	April 29, 2014	Kitt Peak	Spacewatch	·	2.0 km	MPC · JPL
671290	2014 JG_{21}	—	November 22, 2012	Kitt Peak	Spacewatch	·	720 m	MPC · JPL
671291	2014 JZ_{21}	—	February 28, 2014	Haleakala	Pan-STARRS 1	·	530 m	MPC · JPL
671292	2014 JC_{25}	—	May 6, 2014	Mount Lemmon	Mount Lemmon Survey	H	450 m	MPC · JPL
671293	2014 JJ_{25}	—	April 24, 2014	Haleakala	Pan-STARRS 1	H	340 m	MPC · JPL
671294	2014 JO_{25}	—	May 5, 2014	Mount Lemmon	Mount Lemmon Survey	APO +1km · PHA	940 m	MPC · JPL
671295	2014 JW_{25}	—	October 22, 2008	Kitt Peak	Spacewatch	·	600 m	MPC · JPL
671296	2014 JX_{26}	—	May 4, 2014	Haleakala	Pan-STARRS 1	·	2.3 km	MPC · JPL
671297	2014 JD_{29}	—	September 28, 2003	Apache Point	SDSS Collaboration	·	1.3 km	MPC · JPL
671298	2014 JO_{34}	—	February 13, 2008	Kitt Peak	Spacewatch	·	1.8 km	MPC · JPL
671299	2014 JY_{38}	—	May 2, 2014	Kitt Peak	Spacewatch	TEL	1.2 km	MPC · JPL
671300	2014 JZ_{38}	—	May 4, 2014	Haleakala	Pan-STARRS 1	PHO	910 m	MPC · JPL

== 671301–671400 ==
back to top

Designation			Discovery			Properties		Ref
Permanent	Provisional	Named after	Date	Site	Discoverer(s)	Category	Diam.	Ref
671301	2014 JG_{41}	—	September 8, 2004	Apache Point	SDSS Collaboration	THM	2.1 km	MPC · JPL
671302	2014 JY_{42}	—	May 5, 2014	Haleakala	Pan-STARRS 1	·	2.6 km	MPC · JPL
671303	2014 JH_{43}	—	September 14, 2007	Catalina	CSS	·	1.3 km	MPC · JPL
671304	2014 JY_{44}	—	April 5, 2014	Haleakala	Pan-STARRS 1	·	1.7 km	MPC · JPL
671305	2014 JL_{46}	—	October 10, 2002	Palomar	NEAT	·	2.2 km	MPC · JPL
671306	2014 JB_{48}	—	May 6, 2014	Haleakala	Pan-STARRS 1	·	2.4 km	MPC · JPL
671307	2014 JF_{48}	—	February 28, 2008	Kitt Peak	Spacewatch	·	1.8 km	MPC · JPL
671308	2014 JK_{51}	—	September 26, 2003	Apache Point	SDSS Collaboration	·	980 m	MPC · JPL
671309	2014 JM_{52}	—	June 1, 2003	Kitt Peak	Spacewatch	EUP	3.3 km	MPC · JPL
671310	2014 JJ_{54}	—	September 6, 2012	Haleakala	Pan-STARRS 1	H	440 m	MPC · JPL
671311	2014 JP_{54}	—	June 19, 2009	Mount Lemmon	Mount Lemmon Survey	H	470 m	MPC · JPL
671312	2014 JZ_{55}	—	April 7, 2014	Mount Lemmon	Mount Lemmon Survey	H	410 m	MPC · JPL
671313	2014 JJ_{56}	—	May 6, 2014	Haleakala	Pan-STARRS 1	H	380 m	MPC · JPL
671314	2014 JL_{56}	—	December 3, 2010	Kitt Peak	Spacewatch	·	5.0 km	MPC · JPL
671315	2014 JP_{56}	—	April 12, 2011	Mount Lemmon	Mount Lemmon Survey	H	390 m	MPC · JPL
671316	2014 JA_{57}	—	December 5, 2010	Mount Lemmon	Mount Lemmon Survey	H	430 m	MPC · JPL
671317	2014 JW_{58}	—	May 4, 2014	Haleakala	Pan-STARRS 1	·	2.8 km	MPC · JPL
671318	2014 JM_{61}	—	March 28, 2014	Mount Lemmon	Mount Lemmon Survey	·	490 m	MPC · JPL
671319	2014 JO_{62}	—	April 24, 2014	Kitt Peak	Spacewatch	·	470 m	MPC · JPL
671320	2014 JG_{63}	—	May 8, 2014	Haleakala	Pan-STARRS 1	URS	2.6 km	MPC · JPL
671321	2014 JQ_{63}	—	April 28, 2003	Apache Point	SDSS Collaboration	EUP	2.0 km	MPC · JPL
671322	2014 JJ_{67}	—	May 8, 2014	Haleakala	Pan-STARRS 1	·	1.7 km	MPC · JPL
671323	2014 JA_{72}	—	July 24, 2001	Palomar	NEAT	·	2.2 km	MPC · JPL
671324	2014 JS_{72}	—	April 30, 2014	Haleakala	Pan-STARRS 1	·	1.9 km	MPC · JPL
671325	2014 JJ_{73}	—	May 8, 2014	Haleakala	Pan-STARRS 1	·	2.5 km	MPC · JPL
671326	2014 JP_{73}	—	April 30, 2014	Haleakala	Pan-STARRS 1	V	440 m	MPC · JPL
671327	2014 JN_{75}	—	August 12, 2010	Kitt Peak	Spacewatch	·	1.5 km	MPC · JPL
671328	2014 JR_{75}	—	April 30, 2014	Haleakala	Pan-STARRS 1	·	840 m	MPC · JPL
671329	2014 JP_{76}	—	May 8, 2014	Haleakala	Pan-STARRS 1	T_{j} (2.99) · (895)	3.4 km	MPC · JPL
671330	2014 JD_{79}	—	September 15, 2003	Palomar	NEAT	PHO	1.2 km	MPC · JPL
671331	2014 JZ_{79}	—	September 29, 2011	Kitt Peak	Spacewatch	·	1.6 km	MPC · JPL
671332	2014 JQ_{82}	—	May 4, 2014	Haleakala	Pan-STARRS 1	·	1.3 km	MPC · JPL
671333	2014 JX_{83}	—	September 29, 2003	Anderson Mesa	LONEOS	EUN	1.2 km	MPC · JPL
671334	2014 JO_{84}	—	May 10, 2014	Haleakala	Pan-STARRS 1	·	990 m	MPC · JPL
671335	2014 JH_{85}	—	May 12, 2007	Mount Lemmon	Mount Lemmon Survey	·	910 m	MPC · JPL
671336	2014 JR_{85}	—	May 6, 2014	Haleakala	Pan-STARRS 1	·	2.4 km	MPC · JPL
671337	2014 JT_{85}	—	May 6, 2014	Haleakala	Pan-STARRS 1	EOS	1.8 km	MPC · JPL
671338	2014 JW_{85}	—	April 13, 2013	Haleakala	Pan-STARRS 1	·	2.7 km	MPC · JPL
671339	2014 JY_{89}	—	May 6, 2014	Haleakala	Pan-STARRS 1	·	1.0 km	MPC · JPL
671340	2014 JC_{90}	—	May 8, 2014	Haleakala	Pan-STARRS 1	·	1.6 km	MPC · JPL
671341	2014 JH_{92}	—	May 5, 2014	Haleakala	Pan-STARRS 1	·	1.9 km	MPC · JPL
671342	2014 JV_{100}	—	May 7, 2014	Haleakala	Pan-STARRS 1	·	1.8 km	MPC · JPL
671343	2014 JW_{102}	—	May 6, 2014	Haleakala	Pan-STARRS 1	·	2.2 km	MPC · JPL
671344	2014 JE_{105}	—	May 6, 2014	Haleakala	Pan-STARRS 1	·	660 m	MPC · JPL
671345	2014 JH_{105}	—	May 4, 2014	Haleakala	Pan-STARRS 1	·	790 m	MPC · JPL
671346	2014 JO_{106}	—	March 13, 2007	Mount Lemmon	Mount Lemmon Survey	·	650 m	MPC · JPL
671347	2014 JV_{106}	—	May 8, 2014	Haleakala	Pan-STARRS 1	·	1.5 km	MPC · JPL
671348	2014 JM_{107}	—	May 8, 2014	Haleakala	Pan-STARRS 1	·	2.6 km	MPC · JPL
671349	2014 JA_{108}	—	May 7, 2014	Haleakala	Pan-STARRS 1	·	810 m	MPC · JPL
671350	2014 JO_{108}	—	May 8, 2014	Haleakala	Pan-STARRS 1	·	2.2 km	MPC · JPL
671351	2014 JT_{108}	—	October 27, 2005	Mount Lemmon	Mount Lemmon Survey	·	2.3 km	MPC · JPL
671352	2014 JR_{111}	—	May 2, 2014	Mount Lemmon	Mount Lemmon Survey	VER	1.9 km	MPC · JPL
671353	2014 JA_{119}	—	May 6, 2014	Haleakala	Pan-STARRS 1	·	720 m	MPC · JPL
671354	2014 JY_{124}	—	May 6, 2014	Mount Lemmon	Mount Lemmon Survey	·	2.0 km	MPC · JPL
671355	2014 JG_{127}	—	May 7, 2014	Haleakala	Pan-STARRS 1	·	2.3 km	MPC · JPL
671356	2014 JK_{127}	—	May 5, 2014	Mount Lemmon	Mount Lemmon Survey	HYG	2.1 km	MPC · JPL
671357	2014 KT_{2}	—	September 26, 2006	Catalina	CSS	AGN	1.5 km	MPC · JPL
671358	2014 KE_{4}	—	May 20, 2014	Haleakala	Pan-STARRS 1	H	400 m	MPC · JPL
671359	2014 KA_{7}	—	August 30, 2005	Kitt Peak	Spacewatch	·	1.6 km	MPC · JPL
671360	2014 KM_{7}	—	September 25, 2008	Kitt Peak	Spacewatch	·	550 m	MPC · JPL
671361	2014 KJ_{8}	—	March 19, 2009	Mount Lemmon	Mount Lemmon Survey	·	1.7 km	MPC · JPL
671362	2014 KH_{13}	—	May 21, 2014	Haleakala	Pan-STARRS 1	·	2.8 km	MPC · JPL
671363	2014 KY_{14}	—	April 30, 2014	Haleakala	Pan-STARRS 1	·	3.2 km	MPC · JPL
671364	2014 KW_{15}	—	May 4, 2014	Mount Lemmon	Mount Lemmon Survey	·	1.5 km	MPC · JPL
671365	2014 KD_{16}	—	May 24, 2001	Cerro Tololo	Deep Ecliptic Survey	·	1.8 km	MPC · JPL
671366	2014 KY_{20}	—	May 8, 2014	Mount Lemmon	Mount Lemmon Survey	T_{j} (2.99)	2.9 km	MPC · JPL
671367	2014 KM_{21}	—	May 4, 2014	Mount Lemmon	Mount Lemmon Survey	H	360 m	MPC · JPL
671368	2014 KS_{25}	—	April 14, 2008	Mount Lemmon	Mount Lemmon Survey	·	2.4 km	MPC · JPL
671369	2014 KA_{29}	—	May 4, 2014	Mount Lemmon	Mount Lemmon Survey	·	720 m	MPC · JPL
671370	2014 KZ_{29}	—	May 4, 2014	Haleakala	Pan-STARRS 1	·	600 m	MPC · JPL
671371	2014 KR_{30}	—	May 21, 2007	Kitt Peak	Spacewatch	·	630 m	MPC · JPL
671372	2014 KA_{31}	—	August 25, 2011	Piszkés-tető	K. Sárneczky, S. Kürti	·	1.3 km	MPC · JPL
671373	2014 KC_{31}	—	May 4, 2014	Haleakala	Pan-STARRS 1	·	1.8 km	MPC · JPL
671374	2014 KJ_{31}	—	May 2, 2014	Kitt Peak	Spacewatch	V	450 m	MPC · JPL
671375	2014 KO_{33}	—	May 4, 2014	Mount Lemmon	Mount Lemmon Survey	·	500 m	MPC · JPL
671376	2014 KL_{34}	—	August 30, 2011	Haleakala	Pan-STARRS 1	·	540 m	MPC · JPL
671377	2014 KP_{34}	—	August 1, 2001	Palomar	NEAT	·	2.0 km	MPC · JPL
671378	2014 KJ_{37}	—	December 21, 2012	Mount Lemmon	Mount Lemmon Survey	·	1.9 km	MPC · JPL
671379	2014 KK_{38}	—	April 22, 2009	Kitt Peak	Spacewatch	H	350 m	MPC · JPL
671380	2014 KW_{38}	—	May 10, 2014	Haleakala	Pan-STARRS 1	H	380 m	MPC · JPL
671381	2014 KA_{39}	—	October 27, 2008	Mount Lemmon	Mount Lemmon Survey	·	580 m	MPC · JPL
671382	2014 KC_{40}	—	May 23, 2014	Haleakala	Pan-STARRS 1	H	390 m	MPC · JPL
671383	2014 KH_{44}	—	February 13, 2004	Kitt Peak	Spacewatch	·	2.4 km	MPC · JPL
671384	2014 KX_{44}	—	April 28, 2014	Haleakala	Pan-STARRS 1	H	470 m	MPC · JPL
671385	2014 KM_{45}	—	September 22, 2012	Mount Lemmon	Mount Lemmon Survey	H	380 m	MPC · JPL
671386	2014 KL_{47}	—	August 24, 2011	Haleakala	Pan-STARRS 1	·	510 m	MPC · JPL
671387	2014 KT_{48}	—	December 13, 2006	Mount Lemmon	Mount Lemmon Survey	KOR	1.3 km	MPC · JPL
671388	2014 KE_{49}	—	April 25, 2014	Mount Lemmon	Mount Lemmon Survey	EOS	1.8 km	MPC · JPL
671389	2014 KN_{50}	—	May 4, 2014	Haleakala	Pan-STARRS 1	·	610 m	MPC · JPL
671390	2014 KT_{50}	—	May 21, 2014	Haleakala	Pan-STARRS 1	EOS	1.9 km	MPC · JPL
671391	2014 KD_{52}	—	May 7, 2014	Haleakala	Pan-STARRS 1	(883)	520 m	MPC · JPL
671392	2014 KN_{52}	—	May 22, 2014	Mount Lemmon	Mount Lemmon Survey	·	2.5 km	MPC · JPL
671393	2014 KU_{53}	—	May 22, 2014	Mount Lemmon	Mount Lemmon Survey	V	420 m	MPC · JPL
671394	2014 KF_{54}	—	December 23, 2012	Haleakala	Pan-STARRS 1	·	2.0 km	MPC · JPL
671395	2014 KG_{57}	—	May 24, 2014	Mount Lemmon	Mount Lemmon Survey	·	1.9 km	MPC · JPL
671396	2014 KT_{57}	—	October 26, 2011	Haleakala	Pan-STARRS 1	·	1.2 km	MPC · JPL
671397	2014 KW_{58}	—	June 30, 2005	Palomar	NEAT	·	2.2 km	MPC · JPL
671398	2014 KB_{59}	—	May 6, 2014	Haleakala	Pan-STARRS 1	·	2.2 km	MPC · JPL
671399	2014 KW_{60}	—	October 11, 2007	Kitt Peak	Spacewatch	EUN	1.2 km	MPC · JPL
671400	2014 KN_{64}	—	October 1, 2010	Mount Lemmon	Mount Lemmon Survey	·	2.5 km	MPC · JPL

== 671401–671500 ==
back to top

Designation			Discovery			Properties		Ref
Permanent	Provisional	Named after	Date	Site	Discoverer(s)	Category	Diam.	Ref
671401	2014 KO_{64}	—	October 17, 2010	Mount Lemmon	Mount Lemmon Survey	·	2.3 km	MPC · JPL
671402	2014 KY_{67}	—	February 14, 2010	Mount Lemmon	Mount Lemmon Survey	·	600 m	MPC · JPL
671403	2014 KC_{69}	—	May 23, 2014	Haleakala	Pan-STARRS 1	·	2.4 km	MPC · JPL
671404	2014 KA_{70}	—	May 23, 2014	Haleakala	Pan-STARRS 1	·	2.1 km	MPC · JPL
671405	2014 KV_{72}	—	May 7, 2014	Haleakala	Pan-STARRS 1	·	2.2 km	MPC · JPL
671406	2014 KT_{74}	—	November 25, 2011	Les Engarouines	L. Bernasconi	·	2.1 km	MPC · JPL
671407	2014 KF_{75}	—	October 28, 2008	Mount Lemmon	Mount Lemmon Survey	·	510 m	MPC · JPL
671408	2014 KR_{75}	—	October 18, 2011	Mount Lemmon	Mount Lemmon Survey	·	650 m	MPC · JPL
671409	2014 KN_{77}	—	January 15, 2004	Kitt Peak	Spacewatch	·	1.9 km	MPC · JPL
671410	2014 KW_{78}	—	April 30, 2014	Haleakala	Pan-STARRS 1	·	840 m	MPC · JPL
671411	2014 KF_{79}	—	May 10, 2014	Haleakala	Pan-STARRS 1	·	620 m	MPC · JPL
671412	2014 KG_{79}	—	May 27, 2014	Mount Lemmon	Mount Lemmon Survey	NYS	650 m	MPC · JPL
671413	2014 KY_{82}	—	May 21, 2014	Haleakala	Pan-STARRS 1	·	830 m	MPC · JPL
671414	2014 KG_{86}	—	May 24, 2014	Haleakala	Pan-STARRS 1	·	1.7 km	MPC · JPL
671415	2014 KB_{89}	—	May 10, 2014	Mount Lemmon	Mount Lemmon Survey	·	2.3 km	MPC · JPL
671416	2014 KR_{89}	—	May 1, 2003	Apache Point	SDSS	H	490 m	MPC · JPL
671417	2014 KZ_{90}	—	October 12, 2007	Mount Lemmon	Mount Lemmon Survey	H	310 m	MPC · JPL
671418	2014 KX_{91}	—	April 5, 2014	Haleakala	Pan-STARRS 1	PHO	610 m	MPC · JPL
671419	2014 KF_{92}	—	February 25, 2007	Mount Lemmon	Mount Lemmon Survey	·	710 m	MPC · JPL
671420	2014 KG_{95}	—	April 30, 2014	Haleakala	Pan-STARRS 1	·	2.7 km	MPC · JPL
671421	2014 KK_{95}	—	August 27, 2005	Palomar	NEAT	·	2.4 km	MPC · JPL
671422	2014 KN_{95}	—	December 25, 2005	Kitt Peak	Spacewatch	·	2.9 km	MPC · JPL
671423	2014 KU_{97}	—	May 26, 2014	Haleakala	Pan-STARRS 1	H	440 m	MPC · JPL
671424	2014 KC_{100}	—	May 10, 2014	Haleakala	Pan-STARRS 1	H	320 m	MPC · JPL
671425	2014 KU_{105}	—	May 31, 2014	Haleakala	Pan-STARRS 1	·	2.2 km	MPC · JPL
671426	2014 KM_{106}	—	May 7, 2014	Haleakala	Pan-STARRS 1	·	2.8 km	MPC · JPL
671427	2014 KS_{106}	—	October 13, 2010	Mount Lemmon	Mount Lemmon Survey	·	2.2 km	MPC · JPL
671428	2014 KV_{106}	—	May 21, 2014	Kitt Peak	Spacewatch	·	630 m	MPC · JPL
671429	2014 KP_{107}	—	May 21, 2014	Haleakala	Pan-STARRS 1	·	2.6 km	MPC · JPL
671430	2014 KS_{107}	—	August 9, 2010	Kitt Peak	Spacewatch	·	2.3 km	MPC · JPL
671431	2014 KO_{108}	—	October 6, 2011	Les Engarouines	L. Bernasconi	·	2.3 km	MPC · JPL
671432	2014 KC_{110}	—	February 14, 2013	Kitt Peak	Spacewatch	·	2.2 km	MPC · JPL
671433	2014 KS_{111}	—	May 26, 2014	Haleakala	Pan-STARRS 1	·	1.0 km	MPC · JPL
671434	2014 KX_{111}	—	May 27, 2014	Haleakala	Pan-STARRS 1	·	2.5 km	MPC · JPL
671435	2014 KC_{112}	—	May 28, 2014	Haleakala	Pan-STARRS 1	(8737)	2.2 km	MPC · JPL
671436	2014 KM_{113}	—	August 21, 2015	Haleakala	Pan-STARRS 1	·	2.0 km	MPC · JPL
671437	2014 KV_{113}	—	June 28, 2015	Haleakala	Pan-STARRS 1	·	2.6 km	MPC · JPL
671438	2014 KO_{114}	—	March 15, 2010	Catalina	CSS	·	830 m	MPC · JPL
671439	2014 KF_{115}	—	May 28, 2014	Haleakala	Pan-STARRS 1	·	640 m	MPC · JPL
671440	2014 KP_{117}	—	October 9, 2016	Haleakala	Pan-STARRS 1	·	1.9 km	MPC · JPL
671441	2014 KR_{117}	—	November 15, 2011	Mount Lemmon	Mount Lemmon Survey	·	2.2 km	MPC · JPL
671442	2014 KT_{117}	—	May 28, 2014	Haleakala	Pan-STARRS 1	T_{j} (2.99)	2.4 km	MPC · JPL
671443	2014 KD_{119}	—	May 26, 2014	Haleakala	Pan-STARRS 1	TIR	2.1 km	MPC · JPL
671444	2014 KU_{125}	—	May 26, 2014	Haleakala	Pan-STARRS 1	·	3.0 km	MPC · JPL
671445	2014 KH_{127}	—	May 17, 2014	Haleakala	Pan-STARRS 1	·	2.3 km	MPC · JPL
671446	2014 KC_{129}	—	May 27, 2014	Haleakala	Pan-STARRS 1	·	1.3 km	MPC · JPL
671447	2014 KW_{129}	—	May 27, 2014	Haleakala	Pan-STARRS 1	·	2.1 km	MPC · JPL
671448	2014 KP_{141}	—	May 23, 2014	Haleakala	Pan-STARRS 1	·	2.3 km	MPC · JPL
671449	2014 LD_{2}	—	June 2, 2014	Mount Lemmon	Mount Lemmon Survey	·	2.1 km	MPC · JPL
671450	2014 LC_{7}	—	January 18, 2008	Mount Lemmon	Mount Lemmon Survey	·	1.9 km	MPC · JPL
671451	2014 LG_{7}	—	May 7, 2014	Haleakala	Pan-STARRS 1	·	790 m	MPC · JPL
671452	2014 LH_{7}	—	May 21, 2014	Mount Lemmon	Mount Lemmon Survey	·	1.0 km	MPC · JPL
671453	2014 LQ_{8}	—	May 7, 2014	Haleakala	Pan-STARRS 1	·	2.5 km	MPC · JPL
671454	2014 LS_{9}	—	June 3, 2014	Mount Lemmon	Mount Lemmon Survey	H	340 m	MPC · JPL
671455	2014 LB_{12}	—	May 25, 2014	Haleakala	Pan-STARRS 1	·	600 m	MPC · JPL
671456	2014 LZ_{13}	—	May 4, 2014	Mount Lemmon	Mount Lemmon Survey	·	980 m	MPC · JPL
671457	2014 LH_{17}	—	June 1, 2014	Haleakala	Pan-STARRS 1	H	410 m	MPC · JPL
671458	2014 LR_{17}	—	May 7, 2014	Haleakala	Pan-STARRS 1	·	2.2 km	MPC · JPL
671459	2014 LZ_{19}	—	February 1, 2013	Kitt Peak	Spacewatch	·	1.8 km	MPC · JPL
671460	2014 LB_{20}	—	April 1, 2003	Apache Point	SDSS Collaboration	·	1.5 km	MPC · JPL
671461	2014 LC_{20}	—	July 26, 2001	Palomar	NEAT	·	2.3 km	MPC · JPL
671462	2014 LU_{20}	—	January 16, 2004	Palomar	NEAT	·	2.0 km	MPC · JPL
671463	2014 LY_{23}	—	April 10, 2014	Haleakala	Pan-STARRS 1	·	2.9 km	MPC · JPL
671464	2014 LQ_{24}	—	November 4, 2004	Kitt Peak	Spacewatch	·	3.2 km	MPC · JPL
671465	2014 LR_{24}	—	May 26, 2014	Haleakala	Pan-STARRS 1	·	770 m	MPC · JPL
671466	2014 LS_{25}	—	June 9, 2014	Mount Lemmon	Mount Lemmon Survey	H	490 m	MPC · JPL
671467	2014 LO_{28}	—	June 1, 2014	Haleakala	Pan-STARRS 1	cubewano (hot)	140 km	MPC · JPL
671468	2014 LQ_{28}	—	June 3, 2014	Haleakala	Pan-STARRS 1	cubewano (cold) · moon	232 km	MPC · JPL
671469	2014 LF_{29}	—	August 25, 2003	Palomar	NEAT	·	3.1 km	MPC · JPL
671470	2014 LN_{30}	—	June 5, 2014	Haleakala	Pan-STARRS 1	·	2.6 km	MPC · JPL
671471	2014 LP_{30}	—	July 23, 2003	Palomar	NEAT	·	3.1 km	MPC · JPL
671472	2014 LV_{32}	—	September 4, 2007	Mount Lemmon	Mount Lemmon Survey	·	730 m	MPC · JPL
671473	2014 LK_{37}	—	June 4, 2014	Haleakala	Pan-STARRS 1	·	2.4 km	MPC · JPL
671474	2014 LU_{37}	—	June 2, 2014	Haleakala	Pan-STARRS 1	·	3.9 km	MPC · JPL
671475	2014 LC_{39}	—	June 5, 2014	Haleakala	Pan-STARRS 1	MAS	700 m	MPC · JPL
671476	2014 ML	—	September 15, 2009	Mount Lemmon	Mount Lemmon Survey	T_{j} (2.95)	2.1 km	MPC · JPL
671477	2014 MF_{1}	—	December 13, 2001	La Silla	Barbieri, C.	·	3.1 km	MPC · JPL
671478	2014 MH_{4}	—	June 20, 2014	Kitt Peak	Spacewatch	·	600 m	MPC · JPL
671479	2014 MG_{10}	—	May 6, 2014	Haleakala	Pan-STARRS 1	·	650 m	MPC · JPL
671480	2014 MT_{10}	—	September 1, 2005	Palomar	NEAT	BRA	1.9 km	MPC · JPL
671481	2014 MP_{11}	—	January 17, 2013	Haleakala	Pan-STARRS 1	·	940 m	MPC · JPL
671482	2014 MM_{12}	—	March 5, 2013	Haleakala	Pan-STARRS 1	·	2.5 km	MPC · JPL
671483	2014 MK_{13}	—	June 21, 2014	Haleakala	Pan-STARRS 1	·	2.4 km	MPC · JPL
671484	2014 MA_{16}	—	November 6, 2010	Kitt Peak	Spacewatch	·	3.1 km	MPC · JPL
671485	2014 MQ_{16}	—	January 4, 2012	Kitt Peak	Spacewatch	·	3.6 km	MPC · JPL
671486	2014 MK_{17}	—	June 23, 2014	Mount Lemmon	Mount Lemmon Survey	·	1.4 km	MPC · JPL
671487	2014 MG_{21}	—	June 4, 2014	Haleakala	Pan-STARRS 1	·	3.4 km	MPC · JPL
671488	2014 MN_{23}	—	September 30, 2006	Mount Lemmon	Mount Lemmon Survey	·	2.0 km	MPC · JPL
671489	2014 MQ_{23}	—	October 13, 2010	Mount Lemmon	Mount Lemmon Survey	·	2.9 km	MPC · JPL
671490	2014 MR_{23}	—	May 21, 2014	Haleakala	Pan-STARRS 1	·	660 m	MPC · JPL
671491	2014 MM_{24}	—	June 20, 2014	Haleakala	Pan-STARRS 1	·	2.4 km	MPC · JPL
671492	2014 MW_{24}	—	June 25, 2014	Mount Lemmon	Mount Lemmon Survey	·	2.6 km	MPC · JPL
671493	2014 ML_{25}	—	May 3, 2008	Mount Lemmon	Mount Lemmon Survey	·	2.4 km	MPC · JPL
671494	2014 MO_{26}	—	June 27, 2014	Haleakala	Pan-STARRS 1	H	360 m	MPC · JPL
671495	2014 MD_{28}	—	January 18, 2012	Kitt Peak	Spacewatch	(116763)	1.8 km	MPC · JPL
671496	2014 MW_{28}	—	October 24, 2003	Kitt Peak	Deep Ecliptic Survey	·	1.9 km	MPC · JPL
671497	2014 MB_{29}	—	September 30, 2006	Mount Lemmon	Mount Lemmon Survey	KOR	1.4 km	MPC · JPL
671498	2014 MJ_{30}	—	May 21, 2014	Haleakala	Pan-STARRS 1	·	1.7 km	MPC · JPL
671499	2014 MJ_{34}	—	May 7, 2014	Haleakala	Pan-STARRS 1	·	2.8 km	MPC · JPL
671500	2014 MT_{36}	—	June 26, 2014	Haleakala	Pan-STARRS 1	·	560 m	MPC · JPL

== 671501–671600 ==
back to top

Designation			Discovery			Properties		Ref
Permanent	Provisional	Named after	Date	Site	Discoverer(s)	Category	Diam.	Ref
671501	2014 ME_{39}	—	March 5, 2013	Mount Lemmon	Mount Lemmon Survey	·	2.5 km	MPC · JPL
671502	2014 MM_{39}	—	June 2, 2002	Kitt Peak	Spacewatch	·	3.0 km	MPC · JPL
671503	2014 MN_{39}	—	June 27, 2014	Haleakala	Pan-STARRS 1	·	2.5 km	MPC · JPL
671504	2014 MY_{39}	—	April 30, 2013	Palomar	Palomar Transient Factory	·	3.1 km	MPC · JPL
671505	2014 MA_{41}	—	April 5, 2003	Kitt Peak	Spacewatch	·	4.5 km	MPC · JPL
671506	2014 MO_{42}	—	January 17, 2013	Mount Lemmon	Mount Lemmon Survey	·	2.4 km	MPC · JPL
671507	2014 ML_{44}	—	May 8, 2014	Haleakala	Pan-STARRS 1	TIR	2.0 km	MPC · JPL
671508	2014 MM_{44}	—	May 8, 2014	Haleakala	Pan-STARRS 1	·	2.3 km	MPC · JPL
671509	2014 MX_{44}	—	February 22, 2007	Kitt Peak	Spacewatch	·	2.7 km	MPC · JPL
671510	2014 MK_{45}	—	June 27, 2014	Haleakala	Pan-STARRS 1	·	3.0 km	MPC · JPL
671511	2014 MK_{48}	—	January 27, 2007	Mount Lemmon	Mount Lemmon Survey	·	2.2 km	MPC · JPL
671512	2014 MH_{52}	—	June 5, 2014	Haleakala	Pan-STARRS 1	·	3.4 km	MPC · JPL
671513	2014 MK_{52}	—	April 12, 2013	Haleakala	Pan-STARRS 1	VER	2.6 km	MPC · JPL
671514	2014 MP_{53}	—	May 31, 2014	Haleakala	Pan-STARRS 1	·	2.1 km	MPC · JPL
671515	2014 MB_{54}	—	November 13, 2010	Mount Lemmon	Mount Lemmon Survey	·	2.2 km	MPC · JPL
671516	2014 MD_{54}	—	March 10, 2007	Mount Lemmon	Mount Lemmon Survey	VER	2.5 km	MPC · JPL
671517	2014 MQ_{54}	—	June 30, 2014	Haleakala	Pan-STARRS 1	·	1.3 km	MPC · JPL
671518	2014 MS_{55}	—	March 29, 2008	Kitt Peak	Spacewatch	HYG	2.7 km	MPC · JPL
671519	2014 MZ_{57}	—	December 2, 2010	Mount Lemmon	Mount Lemmon Survey	·	3.2 km	MPC · JPL
671520	2014 MD_{60}	—	September 17, 2003	Kitt Peak	Spacewatch	·	3.4 km	MPC · JPL
671521	2014 MD_{63}	—	June 28, 2014	Haleakala	Pan-STARRS 1	·	2.9 km	MPC · JPL
671522	2014 MN_{64}	—	June 5, 2014	Haleakala	Pan-STARRS 1	·	2.5 km	MPC · JPL
671523	2014 MJ_{65}	—	March 14, 2013	Nogales	M. Schwartz, P. R. Holvorcem	·	2.6 km	MPC · JPL
671524	2014 MQ_{66}	—	March 6, 2013	Haleakala	Pan-STARRS 1	THB	2.2 km	MPC · JPL
671525	2014 MZ_{68}	—	January 2, 2012	Kitt Peak	Spacewatch	T_{j} (2.98) · EUP	3.6 km	MPC · JPL
671526	2014 MM_{69}	—	August 17, 2009	Catalina	CSS	TIR	3.7 km	MPC · JPL
671527	2014 MQ_{69}	—	April 15, 2010	WISE	WISE	·	1.0 km	MPC · JPL
671528	2014 MP_{70}	—	June 26, 2014	Mount Lemmon	Mount Lemmon Survey	H	460 m	MPC · JPL
671529	2014 MU_{71}	—	June 20, 2014	Haleakala	Pan-STARRS 1	·	1.4 km	MPC · JPL
671530	2014 MK_{72}	—	January 1, 2008	Mount Lemmon	Mount Lemmon Survey	·	1.9 km	MPC · JPL
671531	2014 MJ_{73}	—	June 30, 2014	Haleakala	Pan-STARRS 1	·	2.3 km	MPC · JPL
671532	2014 MK_{73}	—	June 30, 2014	Haleakala	Pan-STARRS 1	·	2.5 km	MPC · JPL
671533	2014 MP_{77}	—	March 5, 2013	Haleakala	Pan-STARRS 1	V	580 m	MPC · JPL
671534	2014 MB_{78}	—	April 30, 2009	Kitt Peak	Spacewatch	·	1.4 km	MPC · JPL
671535	2014 MQ_{78}	—	June 27, 2014	Haleakala	Pan-STARRS 1	VER	2.6 km	MPC · JPL
671536	2014 MZ_{78}	—	September 6, 2016	Haleakala	Pan-STARRS 1	·	2.2 km	MPC · JPL
671537	2014 MD_{79}	—	October 25, 2016	Haleakala	Pan-STARRS 1	·	2.2 km	MPC · JPL
671538	2014 MK_{80}	—	June 28, 2014	Haleakala	Pan-STARRS 1	·	2.7 km	MPC · JPL
671539	2014 MR_{80}	—	June 29, 2014	Haleakala	Pan-STARRS 1	·	2.7 km	MPC · JPL
671540	2014 MO_{82}	—	June 18, 2014	Haleakala	Pan-STARRS 1	EOS	1.8 km	MPC · JPL
671541	2014 MD_{83}	—	November 6, 2016	Cerro Paranal	Altmann, M., Prusti, T.	EOS	1.5 km	MPC · JPL
671542	2014 MM_{83}	—	June 27, 2014	Haleakala	Pan-STARRS 1	·	2.2 km	MPC · JPL
671543	2014 MN_{84}	—	June 30, 2014	Haleakala	Pan-STARRS 1	·	2.7 km	MPC · JPL
671544	2014 MS_{84}	—	June 20, 2014	Haleakala	Pan-STARRS 1	·	2.6 km	MPC · JPL
671545	2014 MN_{85}	—	January 31, 2017	Haleakala	Pan-STARRS 1	·	860 m	MPC · JPL
671546	2014 MU_{85}	—	January 3, 2017	Haleakala	Pan-STARRS 1	·	770 m	MPC · JPL
671547	2014 MJ_{86}	—	June 24, 2014	Haleakala	Pan-STARRS 1	URS	2.7 km	MPC · JPL
671548	2014 MD_{88}	—	June 29, 2014	Mount Lemmon	Mount Lemmon Survey	·	2.4 km	MPC · JPL
671549	2014 MG_{89}	—	June 22, 2014	Haleakala	Pan-STARRS 1	·	2.2 km	MPC · JPL
671550	2014 MC_{91}	—	June 24, 2014	Haleakala	Pan-STARRS 1	·	2.8 km	MPC · JPL
671551	2014 MB_{99}	—	June 27, 2014	Haleakala	Pan-STARRS 1	·	2.6 km	MPC · JPL
671552	2014 ML_{100}	—	June 21, 2014	Haleakala	Pan-STARRS 1	·	2.9 km	MPC · JPL
671553	2014 NH_{1}	—	September 28, 2011	Mount Lemmon	Mount Lemmon Survey	·	660 m	MPC · JPL
671554	2014 NF_{9}	—	February 16, 2013	Catalina	CSS	EUN	1.4 km	MPC · JPL
671555	2014 NF_{11}	—	June 4, 2014	Haleakala	Pan-STARRS 1	·	850 m	MPC · JPL
671556	2014 NE_{12}	—	June 4, 2014	Haleakala	Pan-STARRS 1	TIR	2.6 km	MPC · JPL
671557	2014 NH_{13}	—	July 1, 2014	Haleakala	Pan-STARRS 1	·	2.7 km	MPC · JPL
671558	2014 NX_{13}	—	May 25, 2014	Haleakala	Pan-STARRS 1	TIR	2.3 km	MPC · JPL
671559	2014 NA_{18}	—	May 26, 2014	Haleakala	Pan-STARRS 1	·	2.7 km	MPC · JPL
671560	2014 NK_{19}	—	July 2, 2014	Mount Lemmon	Mount Lemmon Survey	EOS	1.4 km	MPC · JPL
671561	2014 NS_{21}	—	June 24, 2014	Haleakala	Pan-STARRS 1	H	440 m	MPC · JPL
671562	2014 NQ_{23}	—	May 7, 2014	Haleakala	Pan-STARRS 1	·	2.4 km	MPC · JPL
671563	2014 NE_{24}	—	February 26, 2007	Mount Lemmon	Mount Lemmon Survey	EOS	2.3 km	MPC · JPL
671564	2014 NN_{24}	—	June 2, 2014	Haleakala	Pan-STARRS 1	·	1.3 km	MPC · JPL
671565	2014 NX_{27}	—	February 8, 2013	Haleakala	Pan-STARRS 1	·	890 m	MPC · JPL
671566	2014 NQ_{29}	—	December 10, 2005	Kitt Peak	Spacewatch	EOS	1.7 km	MPC · JPL
671567	2014 NV_{29}	—	August 20, 2009	Kitt Peak	Spacewatch	·	2.7 km	MPC · JPL
671568	2014 NR_{32}	—	July 2, 2014	Haleakala	Pan-STARRS 1	PHO	820 m	MPC · JPL
671569	2014 NW_{33}	—	February 6, 2013	Kitt Peak	Spacewatch	·	1.7 km	MPC · JPL
671570	2014 NO_{34}	—	May 11, 2013	Mount Lemmon	Mount Lemmon Survey	EOS	1.9 km	MPC · JPL
671571	2014 NH_{37}	—	July 2, 2014	Haleakala	Pan-STARRS 1	H	440 m	MPC · JPL
671572	2014 NU_{42}	—	December 9, 2009	La Sagra	OAM	H	540 m	MPC · JPL
671573	2014 NL_{43}	—	May 4, 2013	Haleakala	Pan-STARRS 1	·	2.5 km	MPC · JPL
671574	2014 NX_{43}	—	July 3, 2014	Haleakala	Pan-STARRS 1	H	490 m	MPC · JPL
671575	2014 NV_{45}	—	June 29, 2014	Haleakala	Pan-STARRS 1	H	310 m	MPC · JPL
671576	2014 NS_{46}	—	July 2, 2014	Mount Lemmon	Mount Lemmon Survey	·	1.3 km	MPC · JPL
671577	2014 ND_{47}	—	September 24, 2009	Mount Lemmon	Mount Lemmon Survey	·	2.7 km	MPC · JPL
671578	2014 NL_{49}	—	April 16, 2013	Haleakala	Pan-STARRS 1	URS	3.3 km	MPC · JPL
671579	2014 NQ_{50}	—	June 26, 2014	Haleakala	Pan-STARRS 1	LUT	4.3 km	MPC · JPL
671580	2014 NO_{51}	—	May 15, 2008	Mount Lemmon	Mount Lemmon Survey	·	2.5 km	MPC · JPL
671581	2014 NY_{51}	—	June 17, 2010	Mount Lemmon	Mount Lemmon Survey	JUN	1.1 km	MPC · JPL
671582	2014 NH_{52}	—	June 27, 2007	Kitt Peak	Spacewatch	·	670 m	MPC · JPL
671583	2014 NF_{53}	—	July 4, 2014	Haleakala	Pan-STARRS 1	·	3.7 km	MPC · JPL
671584	2014 NK_{57}	—	August 18, 2003	Haleakala	NEAT	·	2.6 km	MPC · JPL
671585	2014 NN_{57}	—	July 6, 2014	Haleakala	Pan-STARRS 1	·	800 m	MPC · JPL
671586	2014 NB_{60}	—	June 26, 2014	Haleakala	Pan-STARRS 1	PHO	1.0 km	MPC · JPL
671587	2014 NN_{60}	—	June 26, 2014	Haleakala	Pan-STARRS 1	·	1.3 km	MPC · JPL
671588	2014 NA_{62}	—	February 7, 2003	Palomar	NEAT	·	2.8 km	MPC · JPL
671589	2014 NJ_{63}	—	June 27, 2014	Haleakala	Pan-STARRS 1	H	460 m	MPC · JPL
671590	2014 NX_{70}	—	September 19, 2010	Kitt Peak	Spacewatch	·	1.0 km	MPC · JPL
671591	2014 NL_{73}	—	July 4, 2014	Haleakala	Pan-STARRS 1	·	2.2 km	MPC · JPL
671592	2014 NR_{86}	—	July 1, 2014	Haleakala	Pan-STARRS 1	H	380 m	MPC · JPL
671593	2014 NT_{86}	—	July 7, 2014	Haleakala	Pan-STARRS 1	plutino	307 km	MPC · JPL
671594	2014 NZ_{89}	—	July 1, 2014	Haleakala	Pan-STARRS 1	·	920 m	MPC · JPL
671595	2014 ND_{90}	—	July 4, 2014	Haleakala	Pan-STARRS 1	·	880 m	MPC · JPL
671596	2014 OQ_{2}	—	December 8, 2012	Nogales	M. Schwartz, P. R. Holvorcem	H	600 m	MPC · JPL
671597	2014 OS_{2}	—	December 5, 2005	Kitt Peak	Spacewatch	·	2.2 km	MPC · JPL
671598	2014 OO_{3}	—	February 16, 2012	Haleakala	Pan-STARRS 1	·	2.9 km	MPC · JPL
671599	2014 OY_{4}	—	July 25, 2014	Haleakala	Pan-STARRS 1	H	370 m	MPC · JPL
671600	2014 OT_{6}	—	April 20, 2013	Palomar	Palomar Transient Factory	·	2.1 km	MPC · JPL

== 671601–671700 ==
back to top

Designation			Discovery			Properties		Ref
Permanent	Provisional	Named after	Date	Site	Discoverer(s)	Category	Diam.	Ref
671601	2014 OQ_{7}	—	January 21, 2012	Catalina	CSS	·	2.5 km	MPC · JPL
671602	2014 OF_{14}	—	July 25, 2014	Haleakala	Pan-STARRS 1	·	2.2 km	MPC · JPL
671603	2014 OE_{15}	—	July 25, 2014	Haleakala	Pan-STARRS 1	3:2	3.4 km	MPC · JPL
671604	2014 OF_{15}	—	March 18, 2010	Kitt Peak	Spacewatch	·	500 m	MPC · JPL
671605	2014 OX_{15}	—	October 23, 2011	Haleakala	Pan-STARRS 1	PHO	1.0 km	MPC · JPL
671606	2014 OV_{19}	—	January 19, 2012	Haleakala	Pan-STARRS 1	·	1.8 km	MPC · JPL
671607	2014 OH_{21}	—	September 29, 2010	Mount Lemmon	Mount Lemmon Survey	·	1.2 km	MPC · JPL
671608	2014 OX_{28}	—	July 25, 2014	Haleakala	Pan-STARRS 1	·	1.1 km	MPC · JPL
671609	2014 OP_{29}	—	July 25, 2014	Haleakala	Pan-STARRS 1	·	420 m	MPC · JPL
671610	2014 OQ_{30}	—	January 29, 2011	Mount Lemmon	Mount Lemmon Survey	·	3.3 km	MPC · JPL
671611	2014 OP_{38}	—	May 7, 2014	Haleakala	Pan-STARRS 1	T_{j} (2.98)	3.0 km	MPC · JPL
671612	2014 OC_{40}	—	January 2, 2009	Mount Lemmon	Mount Lemmon Survey	·	930 m	MPC · JPL
671613	2014 OV_{40}	—	June 27, 2014	Haleakala	Pan-STARRS 1	V	480 m	MPC · JPL
671614	2014 OX_{47}	—	June 27, 2014	Haleakala	Pan-STARRS 1	EUP	3.5 km	MPC · JPL
671615	2014 OD_{49}	—	April 17, 2013	Haleakala	Pan-STARRS 1	·	2.7 km	MPC · JPL
671616	2014 OM_{49}	—	June 27, 2014	Haleakala	Pan-STARRS 1	MAS	490 m	MPC · JPL
671617	2014 OZ_{51}	—	December 8, 2010	Mayhill-ISON	L. Elenin	EOS	2.4 km	MPC · JPL
671618	2014 OL_{56}	—	December 4, 2010	Mount Lemmon	Mount Lemmon Survey	EOS	2.1 km	MPC · JPL
671619	2014 OG_{62}	—	December 11, 2010	Mount Lemmon	Mount Lemmon Survey	·	2.9 km	MPC · JPL
671620	2014 OU_{63}	—	October 21, 2003	Kitt Peak	Spacewatch	·	910 m	MPC · JPL
671621	2014 ON_{64}	—	November 12, 2010	Mount Lemmon	Mount Lemmon Survey	·	2.5 km	MPC · JPL
671622	2014 OO_{65}	—	July 6, 2014	Haleakala	Pan-STARRS 1	EUP	2.7 km	MPC · JPL
671623	2014 OP_{66}	—	July 25, 2014	Haleakala	Pan-STARRS 1	(5)	870 m	MPC · JPL
671624	2014 OJ_{68}	—	January 5, 2013	Mount Lemmon	Mount Lemmon Survey	·	760 m	MPC · JPL
671625	2014 OV_{69}	—	February 15, 2013	Haleakala	Pan-STARRS 1	·	920 m	MPC · JPL
671626	2014 OK_{72}	—	July 6, 2014	Haleakala	Pan-STARRS 1	·	730 m	MPC · JPL
671627	2014 OV_{76}	—	October 2, 2010	Kitt Peak	Spacewatch	·	2.0 km	MPC · JPL
671628	2014 OC_{77}	—	December 1, 2005	Kitt Peak	Spacewatch	·	2.3 km	MPC · JPL
671629	2014 OK_{79}	—	June 30, 2014	Haleakala	Pan-STARRS 1	·	950 m	MPC · JPL
671630	2014 OS_{79}	—	February 23, 2012	Mount Lemmon	Mount Lemmon Survey	·	2.9 km	MPC · JPL
671631	2014 OD_{82}	—	January 18, 2012	Mount Lemmon	Mount Lemmon Survey	EOS	1.8 km	MPC · JPL
671632	2014 OR_{82}	—	November 30, 2003	Kitt Peak	Spacewatch	·	900 m	MPC · JPL
671633	2014 OT_{83}	—	April 12, 2013	Nogales	M. Schwartz, P. R. Holvorcem	·	2.5 km	MPC · JPL
671634	2014 OH_{84}	—	March 5, 2010	Kitt Peak	Spacewatch	·	750 m	MPC · JPL
671635	2014 OM_{84}	—	March 20, 2010	Kitt Peak	Spacewatch	MAS	580 m	MPC · JPL
671636	2014 OJ_{85}	—	July 26, 2014	Haleakala	Pan-STARRS 1	PHO	640 m	MPC · JPL
671637	2014 OR_{88}	—	October 15, 2004	Mount Lemmon	Mount Lemmon Survey	·	2.8 km	MPC · JPL
671638	2014 OS_{89}	—	June 2, 2014	Haleakala	Pan-STARRS 1	·	410 m	MPC · JPL
671639	2014 OX_{89}	—	July 2, 2014	Haleakala	Pan-STARRS 1	·	770 m	MPC · JPL
671640	2014 OD_{94}	—	August 18, 2009	Kitt Peak	Spacewatch	·	2.0 km	MPC · JPL
671641	2014 OJ_{95}	—	March 17, 2013	Mount Lemmon	Mount Lemmon Survey	H	510 m	MPC · JPL
671642	2014 OQ_{95}	—	July 26, 2014	Haleakala	Pan-STARRS 1	H	420 m	MPC · JPL
671643	2014 OE_{96}	—	July 26, 2014	Haleakala	Pan-STARRS 1	MAS	720 m	MPC · JPL
671644	2014 OA_{99}	—	July 26, 2014	Haleakala	Pan-STARRS 1	·	1.5 km	MPC · JPL
671645	2014 OB_{101}	—	August 28, 2003	Palomar	NEAT	·	3.0 km	MPC · JPL
671646	2014 OL_{101}	—	July 26, 2014	Haleakala	Pan-STARRS 1	·	600 m	MPC · JPL
671647	2014 OR_{102}	—	July 26, 2014	Haleakala	Pan-STARRS 1	TIR	2.9 km	MPC · JPL
671648	2014 OS_{106}	—	February 15, 2010	Kitt Peak	Spacewatch	·	560 m	MPC · JPL
671649	2014 ON_{109}	—	January 24, 2006	Anderson Mesa	LONEOS	·	2.5 km	MPC · JPL
671650	2014 OH_{110}	—	December 14, 2010	Mount Lemmon	Mount Lemmon Survey	·	2.4 km	MPC · JPL
671651	2014 OO_{110}	—	July 25, 2014	Haleakala	Pan-STARRS 1	·	950 m	MPC · JPL
671652	2014 OV_{111}	—	June 3, 2014	Haleakala	Pan-STARRS 1	H	470 m	MPC · JPL
671653	2014 OP_{112}	—	April 1, 2003	Apache Point	SDSS	·	2.5 km	MPC · JPL
671654	2014 OY_{119}	—	July 25, 2014	Haleakala	Pan-STARRS 1	·	1.1 km	MPC · JPL
671655	2014 OL_{120}	—	June 29, 2014	Haleakala	Pan-STARRS 1	·	800 m	MPC · JPL
671656	2014 OC_{127}	—	June 20, 2014	Kitt Peak	Spacewatch	·	760 m	MPC · JPL
671657	2014 OC_{128}	—	October 20, 2007	Mount Lemmon	Mount Lemmon Survey	·	1.1 km	MPC · JPL
671658	2014 OM_{131}	—	August 10, 2010	La Sagra	OAM	JUN	710 m	MPC · JPL
671659	2014 OY_{133}	—	October 7, 2005	Mauna Kea	A. Boattini	·	3.2 km	MPC · JPL
671660	2014 OB_{134}	—	January 23, 2006	Kitt Peak	Spacewatch	·	600 m	MPC · JPL
671661	2014 OB_{138}	—	April 11, 2013	Mount Lemmon	Mount Lemmon Survey	·	1.5 km	MPC · JPL
671662	2014 OK_{138}	—	July 27, 2014	Haleakala	Pan-STARRS 1	·	2.5 km	MPC · JPL
671663	2014 OY_{142}	—	December 29, 2011	Mount Lemmon	Mount Lemmon Survey	·	2.6 km	MPC · JPL
671664	2014 OW_{145}	—	February 19, 2009	Kitt Peak	Spacewatch	CLA	1.3 km	MPC · JPL
671665	2014 OA_{147}	—	July 27, 2014	Haleakala	Pan-STARRS 1	·	1.1 km	MPC · JPL
671666	2014 OC_{147}	—	July 2, 2014	Haleakala	Pan-STARRS 1	VER	2.3 km	MPC · JPL
671667	2014 OP_{148}	—	July 25, 2014	Haleakala	Pan-STARRS 1	·	950 m	MPC · JPL
671668	2014 OP_{150}	—	February 4, 2006	Kitt Peak	Spacewatch	MAS	550 m	MPC · JPL
671669	2014 OA_{152}	—	July 27, 2014	Haleakala	Pan-STARRS 1	·	1.1 km	MPC · JPL
671670	2014 OM_{153}	—	February 11, 2008	Mount Lemmon	Mount Lemmon Survey	·	1.7 km	MPC · JPL
671671	2014 OQ_{153}	—	September 28, 2003	Anderson Mesa	LONEOS	·	900 m	MPC · JPL
671672	2014 OS_{157}	—	July 27, 2014	Haleakala	Pan-STARRS 1	·	2.7 km	MPC · JPL
671673	2014 OF_{161}	—	October 28, 2006	Mount Lemmon	Mount Lemmon Survey	·	1.2 km	MPC · JPL
671674	2014 OG_{161}	—	October 22, 2003	Kitt Peak	Deep Ecliptic Survey	·	2.2 km	MPC · JPL
671675	2014 OC_{162}	—	July 27, 2014	Haleakala	Pan-STARRS 1	·	550 m	MPC · JPL
671676	2014 OW_{162}	—	July 27, 2014	Haleakala	Pan-STARRS 1	·	3.2 km	MPC · JPL
671677	2014 OW_{175}	—	February 15, 2010	Kitt Peak	Spacewatch	·	610 m	MPC · JPL
671678	2014 OQ_{181}	—	June 28, 2014	Haleakala	Pan-STARRS 1	H	370 m	MPC · JPL
671679	2014 OQ_{185}	—	February 16, 2013	Mount Lemmon	Mount Lemmon Survey	H	340 m	MPC · JPL
671680	2014 OT_{185}	—	July 8, 2014	Haleakala	Pan-STARRS 1	·	970 m	MPC · JPL
671681	2014 OJ_{186}	—	July 27, 2014	Haleakala	Pan-STARRS 1	·	2.1 km	MPC · JPL
671682	2014 OG_{189}	—	March 10, 2005	Mount Lemmon	Mount Lemmon Survey	·	1.1 km	MPC · JPL
671683	2014 OZ_{189}	—	July 27, 2014	Haleakala	Pan-STARRS 1	·	890 m	MPC · JPL
671684	2014 OH_{190}	—	February 14, 2013	Haleakala	Pan-STARRS 1	·	1.1 km	MPC · JPL
671685	2014 OH_{192}	—	July 27, 2014	Haleakala	Pan-STARRS 1	·	1.4 km	MPC · JPL
671686	2014 ON_{193}	—	October 19, 2007	Kitt Peak	Spacewatch	·	700 m	MPC · JPL
671687	2014 OK_{195}	—	July 27, 2014	Haleakala	Pan-STARRS 1	H	430 m	MPC · JPL
671688	2014 OR_{198}	—	September 19, 2003	Palomar	NEAT	EOS	2.3 km	MPC · JPL
671689	2014 OW_{202}	—	July 25, 2014	Haleakala	Pan-STARRS 1	·	2.3 km	MPC · JPL
671690	2014 OV_{205}	—	November 17, 2011	Kitt Peak	Spacewatch	·	700 m	MPC · JPL
671691	2014 OM_{206}	—	April 28, 2008	Mount Lemmon	Mount Lemmon Survey	·	2.2 km	MPC · JPL
671692	2014 OK_{207}	—	January 5, 2013	Mount Lemmon	Mount Lemmon Survey	H	420 m	MPC · JPL
671693	2014 OP_{207}	—	January 13, 2013	Catalina	CSS	H	520 m	MPC · JPL
671694	2014 OB_{210}	—	July 2, 2014	Haleakala	Pan-STARRS 1	·	2.4 km	MPC · JPL
671695	2014 OE_{211}	—	July 25, 2014	Haleakala	Pan-STARRS 1	·	940 m	MPC · JPL
671696	2014 OE_{212}	—	February 15, 2012	Haleakala	Pan-STARRS 1	·	2.2 km	MPC · JPL
671697	2014 OW_{218}	—	November 26, 2011	Mount Lemmon	Mount Lemmon Survey	·	2.0 km	MPC · JPL
671698	2014 OQ_{219}	—	April 26, 2010	Mount Lemmon	Mount Lemmon Survey	·	900 m	MPC · JPL
671699	2014 OR_{220}	—	September 14, 2007	Mount Lemmon	Mount Lemmon Survey	·	920 m	MPC · JPL
671700	2014 OM_{227}	—	May 4, 2002	Palomar	NEAT	·	3.0 km	MPC · JPL

== 671701–671800 ==
back to top

Designation			Discovery			Properties		Ref
Permanent	Provisional	Named after	Date	Site	Discoverer(s)	Category	Diam.	Ref
671701	2014 OM_{234}	—	July 28, 2014	Haleakala	Pan-STARRS 1	·	840 m	MPC · JPL
671702	2014 OR_{238}	—	July 2, 2014	Haleakala	Pan-STARRS 1	HYG	2.6 km	MPC · JPL
671703	2014 OG_{241}	—	June 27, 2014	Haleakala	Pan-STARRS 1	PHO	640 m	MPC · JPL
671704	2014 OK_{241}	—	June 21, 2014	Haleakala	Pan-STARRS 1	·	2.3 km	MPC · JPL
671705	2014 OE_{244}	—	July 29, 2014	Haleakala	Pan-STARRS 1	·	2.8 km	MPC · JPL
671706	2014 OS_{251}	—	January 30, 2011	Mount Lemmon	Mount Lemmon Survey	SYL	3.4 km	MPC · JPL
671707	2014 OL_{253}	—	September 23, 2008	Mount Lemmon	Mount Lemmon Survey	·	710 m	MPC · JPL
671708	2014 OS_{254}	—	January 4, 2001	Haleakala	NEAT	·	3.1 km	MPC · JPL
671709	2014 OT_{254}	—	February 6, 2006	Kitt Peak	Spacewatch	AEG	2.3 km	MPC · JPL
671710	2014 OX_{255}	—	June 27, 2014	Haleakala	Pan-STARRS 1	V	480 m	MPC · JPL
671711	2014 OS_{260}	—	December 29, 2011	Mount Lemmon	Mount Lemmon Survey	·	1.2 km	MPC · JPL
671712	2014 OB_{261}	—	April 15, 2013	Haleakala	Pan-STARRS 1	·	2.8 km	MPC · JPL
671713	2014 OM_{261}	—	July 29, 2014	Haleakala	Pan-STARRS 1	·	1.0 km	MPC · JPL
671714	2014 OL_{266}	—	April 17, 2013	Haleakala	Pan-STARRS 1	·	2.9 km	MPC · JPL
671715	2014 ON_{269}	—	November 10, 2010	Mount Lemmon	Mount Lemmon Survey	·	1.7 km	MPC · JPL
671716	2014 OQ_{270}	—	October 16, 2009	Mount Lemmon	Mount Lemmon Survey	·	2.7 km	MPC · JPL
671717	2014 OY_{270}	—	November 4, 2010	Mount Lemmon	Mount Lemmon Survey	·	1.9 km	MPC · JPL
671718	2014 OQ_{274}	—	May 2, 2008	Kitt Peak	Spacewatch	·	2.2 km	MPC · JPL
671719	2014 OR_{276}	—	September 28, 2003	Kitt Peak	Spacewatch	·	1 km	MPC · JPL
671720	2014 OH_{278}	—	July 29, 2014	Haleakala	Pan-STARRS 1	·	970 m	MPC · JPL
671721	2014 OO_{278}	—	August 28, 2005	Kitt Peak	Spacewatch	AGN	1.1 km	MPC · JPL
671722	2014 OS_{280}	—	July 29, 2014	Haleakala	Pan-STARRS 1	·	860 m	MPC · JPL
671723	2014 OL_{289}	—	July 8, 2014	Haleakala	Pan-STARRS 1	·	580 m	MPC · JPL
671724	2014 OA_{294}	—	July 29, 2014	Haleakala	Pan-STARRS 1	H	430 m	MPC · JPL
671725	2014 OD_{295}	—	August 29, 2005	Kitt Peak	Spacewatch	·	1.3 km	MPC · JPL
671726	2014 OD_{297}	—	March 23, 2012	Bergisch Gladbach	W. Bickel	EOS	2.0 km	MPC · JPL
671727	2014 OH_{297}	—	July 29, 2014	Haleakala	Pan-STARRS 1	H	440 m	MPC · JPL
671728	2014 OL_{297}	—	February 26, 2012	Kitt Peak	Spacewatch	·	2.2 km	MPC · JPL
671729	2014 OE_{298}	—	August 22, 2004	Kitt Peak	Spacewatch	KOR	1.3 km	MPC · JPL
671730	2014 OF_{298}	—	December 4, 2010	Catalina	CSS	·	1.1 km	MPC · JPL
671731	2014 OY_{298}	—	October 9, 2010	Catalina	CSS	·	1.0 km	MPC · JPL
671732	2014 OE_{302}	—	July 25, 2014	Haleakala	Pan-STARRS 1	·	2.7 km	MPC · JPL
671733	2014 OK_{305}	—	January 31, 2012	Kitt Peak	Spacewatch	·	2.5 km	MPC · JPL
671734	2014 OL_{306}	—	November 26, 2011	Mount Lemmon	Mount Lemmon Survey	·	2.7 km	MPC · JPL
671735	2014 OF_{310}	—	July 27, 2014	Haleakala	Pan-STARRS 1	·	1.3 km	MPC · JPL
671736	2014 OU_{312}	—	March 31, 2008	Mount Lemmon	Mount Lemmon Survey	·	1.8 km	MPC · JPL
671737	2014 OR_{314}	—	September 16, 2007	Lulin	LUSS	·	900 m	MPC · JPL
671738	2014 OG_{315}	—	March 19, 2010	Mount Lemmon	Mount Lemmon Survey	·	670 m	MPC · JPL
671739	2014 OJ_{316}	—	July 3, 2014	Haleakala	Pan-STARRS 1	V	490 m	MPC · JPL
671740	2014 OJ_{317}	—	July 7, 2014	Haleakala	Pan-STARRS 1	·	820 m	MPC · JPL
671741	2014 OW_{318}	—	January 25, 2006	Kitt Peak	Spacewatch	·	730 m	MPC · JPL
671742	2014 OD_{331}	—	June 27, 2014	ESA OGS	ESA OGS	MAS	560 m	MPC · JPL
671743	2014 OG_{333}	—	July 8, 2014	Haleakala	Pan-STARRS 1	T_{j} (2.99)	3.0 km	MPC · JPL
671744	2014 OL_{333}	—	February 23, 2007	Catalina	CSS	·	2.9 km	MPC · JPL
671745	2014 OB_{343}	—	December 8, 2008	Mount Lemmon	Mount Lemmon Survey	·	840 m	MPC · JPL
671746	2014 OE_{345}	—	January 19, 2012	Mount Lemmon	Mount Lemmon Survey	·	2.2 km	MPC · JPL
671747	2014 OM_{346}	—	July 28, 2014	Haleakala	Pan-STARRS 1	·	950 m	MPC · JPL
671748	2014 OF_{352}	—	April 2, 2013	Mount Lemmon	Mount Lemmon Survey	·	2.0 km	MPC · JPL
671749	2014 OV_{353}	—	July 28, 2014	Haleakala	Pan-STARRS 1	·	2.3 km	MPC · JPL
671750	2014 OW_{353}	—	October 26, 2009	Kitt Peak	Spacewatch	·	2.6 km	MPC · JPL
671751	2014 ON_{355}	—	June 27, 2014	Haleakala	Pan-STARRS 1	H	350 m	MPC · JPL
671752	2014 OX_{357}	—	June 26, 2014	Haleakala	Pan-STARRS 1	·	1.3 km	MPC · JPL
671753	2014 OB_{358}	—	October 10, 2004	Kitt Peak	Spacewatch	·	2.0 km	MPC · JPL
671754	2014 OW_{360}	—	July 28, 2014	Haleakala	Pan-STARRS 1	V	480 m	MPC · JPL
671755	2014 OR_{363}	—	July 29, 2014	Haleakala	Pan-STARRS 1	H	380 m	MPC · JPL
671756	2014 OU_{364}	—	July 25, 2014	Haleakala	Pan-STARRS 1	H	360 m	MPC · JPL
671757	2014 OQ_{369}	—	January 20, 2009	Kitt Peak	Spacewatch	·	890 m	MPC · JPL
671758	2014 OV_{373}	—	July 25, 2014	Haleakala	Pan-STARRS 1	·	2.4 km	MPC · JPL
671759	2014 OD_{375}	—	September 27, 2003	Kitt Peak	Spacewatch	·	930 m	MPC · JPL
671760	2014 OO_{379}	—	June 20, 2014	Haleakala	Pan-STARRS 1	·	3.3 km	MPC · JPL
671761	2014 OP_{379}	—	September 15, 2009	Catalina	CSS	·	3.5 km	MPC · JPL
671762	2014 OK_{380}	—	December 5, 2005	Mount Lemmon	Mount Lemmon Survey	LIX	3.4 km	MPC · JPL
671763	2014 OL_{380}	—	January 19, 2012	Kitt Peak	Spacewatch	·	3.1 km	MPC · JPL
671764	2014 OR_{381}	—	January 2, 2012	Kitt Peak	Spacewatch	·	4.0 km	MPC · JPL
671765	2014 OB_{383}	—	August 20, 2009	Kitt Peak	Spacewatch	·	2.8 km	MPC · JPL
671766	2014 OU_{384}	—	March 2, 2013	Mount Lemmon	Mount Lemmon Survey	BAR	1.0 km	MPC · JPL
671767	2014 OV_{388}	—	July 7, 2014	Haleakala	Pan-STARRS 1	·	3.1 km	MPC · JPL
671768	2014 OC_{390}	—	April 11, 2013	Kitt Peak	Spacewatch	·	2.7 km	MPC · JPL
671769	2014 OA_{391}	—	May 8, 2013	Haleakala	Pan-STARRS 1	VER	2.7 km	MPC · JPL
671770	2014 OE_{391}	—	June 18, 2013	Haleakala	Pan-STARRS 1	·	1.9 km	MPC · JPL
671771	2014 OP_{391}	—	June 2, 2014	Mount Lemmon	Mount Lemmon Survey	H	500 m	MPC · JPL
671772	2014 OA_{395}	—	July 31, 2014	Haleakala	Pan-STARRS 1	H	430 m	MPC · JPL
671773	2014 OC_{395}	—	July 31, 2014	Haleakala	Pan-STARRS 1	H	460 m	MPC · JPL
671774	2014 OT_{395}	—	July 31, 2014	Haleakala	Pan-STARRS 1	H	340 m	MPC · JPL
671775	2014 OU_{398}	—	October 10, 2007	Mount Lemmon	Mount Lemmon Survey	·	1 km	MPC · JPL
671776	2014 OX_{398}	—	February 11, 2004	Palomar	NEAT	·	1.8 km	MPC · JPL
671777	2014 OB_{399}	—	July 25, 2014	Haleakala	Pan-STARRS 1	·	1.2 km	MPC · JPL
671778	2014 OU_{402}	—	April 6, 2013	Mount Lemmon	Mount Lemmon Survey	·	980 m	MPC · JPL
671779	2014 OQ_{407}	—	October 24, 2005	Kitt Peak	Spacewatch	KOR	1.0 km	MPC · JPL
671780	2014 OK_{409}	—	April 13, 2013	Kitt Peak	Spacewatch	·	2.3 km	MPC · JPL
671781	2014 OX_{410}	—	July 28, 2014	Haleakala	Pan-STARRS 1	·	1.2 km	MPC · JPL
671782	2014 OG_{411}	—	July 28, 2014	Haleakala	Pan-STARRS 1	·	2.6 km	MPC · JPL
671783	2014 OW_{413}	—	April 2, 2013	Mount Lemmon	Mount Lemmon Survey	·	1.0 km	MPC · JPL
671784	2014 OD_{417}	—	July 25, 2014	Haleakala	Pan-STARRS 1	·	950 m	MPC · JPL
671785	2014 OG_{417}	—	July 29, 2014	Haleakala	Pan-STARRS 1	·	990 m	MPC · JPL
671786	2014 OO_{417}	—	March 13, 2008	Mount Lemmon	Mount Lemmon Survey	H	390 m	MPC · JPL
671787	2014 OW_{421}	—	November 23, 2017	Mount Lemmon	Mount Lemmon Survey	H	480 m	MPC · JPL
671788	2014 OP_{427}	—	July 25, 2014	Haleakala	Pan-STARRS 1	THM	1.6 km	MPC · JPL
671789	2014 OG_{451}	—	July 25, 2014	Haleakala	Pan-STARRS 1	·	860 m	MPC · JPL
671790	2014 OS_{459}	—	July 28, 2014	Haleakala	Pan-STARRS 1	PHO	860 m	MPC · JPL
671791	2014 PD_{6}	—	June 2, 2014	Haleakala	Pan-STARRS 1	·	2.4 km	MPC · JPL
671792	2014 PC_{9}	—	October 24, 2005	Mauna Kea	A. Boattini	URS	3.8 km	MPC · JPL
671793	2014 PR_{12}	—	July 25, 2014	Haleakala	Pan-STARRS 1	·	620 m	MPC · JPL
671794	2014 PU_{17}	—	March 4, 2008	Mount Lemmon	Mount Lemmon Survey	AGN	1.2 km	MPC · JPL
671795	2014 PD_{19}	—	June 26, 2014	Haleakala	Pan-STARRS 1	·	700 m	MPC · JPL
671796	2014 PE_{19}	—	April 23, 2007	Mount Graham	Grazian, A., Gredel, R.	·	1.7 km	MPC · JPL
671797	2014 PJ_{19}	—	February 21, 2012	Kitt Peak	Spacewatch	EOS	2.0 km	MPC · JPL
671798	2014 PX_{19}	—	September 21, 2009	Mount Lemmon	Mount Lemmon Survey	·	2.8 km	MPC · JPL
671799	2014 PE_{21}	—	September 16, 2003	Kitt Peak	Spacewatch	VER	2.1 km	MPC · JPL
671800	2014 PX_{22}	—	April 17, 2013	Haleakala	Pan-STARRS 1	·	1.8 km	MPC · JPL

== 671801–671900 ==
back to top

Designation			Discovery			Properties		Ref
Permanent	Provisional	Named after	Date	Site	Discoverer(s)	Category	Diam.	Ref
671801	2014 PK_{25}	—	September 14, 2005	Kitt Peak	Spacewatch	·	2.1 km	MPC · JPL
671802	2014 PN_{25}	—	February 9, 2013	Haleakala	Pan-STARRS 1	·	890 m	MPC · JPL
671803	2014 PO_{25}	—	September 22, 2009	Mount Lemmon	Mount Lemmon Survey	·	2.6 km	MPC · JPL
671804	2014 PT_{27}	—	April 30, 2006	Kitt Peak	Spacewatch	·	810 m	MPC · JPL
671805	2014 PF_{28}	—	October 1, 2003	Kitt Peak	Spacewatch	·	2.5 km	MPC · JPL
671806	2014 PU_{28}	—	March 16, 2012	Mount Lemmon	Mount Lemmon Survey	·	3.3 km	MPC · JPL
671807	2014 PZ_{29}	—	November 9, 2004	Goodricke-Pigott	R. A. Tucker	·	1.8 km	MPC · JPL
671808	2014 PQ_{31}	—	August 4, 2014	Haleakala	Pan-STARRS 1	·	770 m	MPC · JPL
671809	2014 PF_{34}	—	September 11, 2010	Kitt Peak	Spacewatch	·	1.1 km	MPC · JPL
671810	2014 PT_{38}	—	February 16, 2012	Haleakala	Pan-STARRS 1	EOS	1.6 km	MPC · JPL
671811	2014 PR_{39}	—	July 7, 2014	Haleakala	Pan-STARRS 1	·	1.0 km	MPC · JPL
671812	2014 PY_{40}	—	July 28, 2014	Haleakala	Pan-STARRS 1	·	1.5 km	MPC · JPL
671813	2014 PZ_{41}	—	July 7, 2014	Haleakala	Pan-STARRS 1	·	910 m	MPC · JPL
671814	2014 PA_{42}	—	July 26, 2014	Haleakala	Pan-STARRS 1	·	2.8 km	MPC · JPL
671815	2014 PO_{42}	—	July 26, 2014	Haleakala	Pan-STARRS 1	H	430 m	MPC · JPL
671816	2014 PF_{43}	—	August 4, 2014	Haleakala	Pan-STARRS 1	·	3.2 km	MPC · JPL
671817	2014 PL_{46}	—	January 10, 2013	Haleakala	Pan-STARRS 1	PHO	670 m	MPC · JPL
671818	2014 PO_{46}	—	September 19, 1998	Apache Point	SDSS Collaboration	·	2.9 km	MPC · JPL
671819	2014 PS_{46}	—	September 29, 2003	Kitt Peak	Spacewatch	·	2.5 km	MPC · JPL
671820	2014 PZ_{46}	—	April 10, 2013	Mount Lemmon	Mount Lemmon Survey	VER	2.7 km	MPC · JPL
671821	2014 PU_{50}	—	January 27, 2006	Mount Lemmon	Mount Lemmon Survey	VER	2.1 km	MPC · JPL
671822	2014 PJ_{53}	—	February 13, 2010	Mount Lemmon	Mount Lemmon Survey	H	330 m	MPC · JPL
671823	2014 PZ_{53}	—	August 3, 2014	Haleakala	Pan-STARRS 1	H	430 m	MPC · JPL
671824	2014 PC_{55}	—	February 3, 2012	Haleakala	Pan-STARRS 1	·	2.3 km	MPC · JPL
671825	2014 PY_{56}	—	September 23, 2003	Haleakala	NEAT	·	4.1 km	MPC · JPL
671826	2014 PJ_{58}	—	July 2, 2014	Haleakala	Pan-STARRS 1	·	740 m	MPC · JPL
671827	2014 PQ_{59}	—	August 14, 2014	Haleakala	Pan-STARRS 1	H	580 m	MPC · JPL
671828	2014 PK_{60}	—	August 14, 2014	Haleakala	Pan-STARRS 1	·	2.0 km	MPC · JPL
671829	2014 PK_{61}	—	March 13, 2013	Palomar	Palomar Transient Factory	·	2.0 km	MPC · JPL
671830	2014 PY_{62}	—	December 25, 2011	Mount Lemmon	Mount Lemmon Survey	·	1.2 km	MPC · JPL
671831	2014 PK_{64}	—	June 26, 2014	Haleakala	Pan-STARRS 1	·	2.1 km	MPC · JPL
671832	2014 PO_{65}	—	June 21, 2014	Haleakala	Pan-STARRS 1	·	3.7 km	MPC · JPL
671833	2014 PH_{67}	—	July 26, 2014	Haleakala	Pan-STARRS 1	PHO	840 m	MPC · JPL
671834	2014 PS_{69}	—	June 27, 2014	Haleakala	Pan-STARRS 1	·	650 m	MPC · JPL
671835	2014 PT_{70}	—	September 18, 2006	Catalina	CSS	H	410 m	MPC · JPL
671836	2014 PB_{71}	—	February 6, 2010	Mount Lemmon	Mount Lemmon Survey	H	440 m	MPC · JPL
671837	2014 PS_{78}	—	October 26, 2011	Haleakala	Pan-STARRS 1	·	560 m	MPC · JPL
671838	2014 PN_{82}	—	August 6, 2014	Haleakala	Pan-STARRS 1	·	1.0 km	MPC · JPL
671839	2014 PU_{82}	—	August 6, 2014	Haleakala	Pan-STARRS 1	·	770 m	MPC · JPL
671840	2014 PL_{87}	—	August 14, 2014	Haleakala	Pan-STARRS 1	·	1.1 km	MPC · JPL
671841	2014 PB_{91}	—	August 3, 2014	Haleakala	Pan-STARRS 1	·	2.5 km	MPC · JPL
671842	2014 PZ_{94}	—	August 6, 2014	Haleakala	Pan-STARRS 1	·	680 m	MPC · JPL
671843	2014 QF	—	November 16, 2009	Kitt Peak	Spacewatch	·	2.5 km	MPC · JPL
671844	2014 QL	—	January 27, 2007	Mount Lemmon	Mount Lemmon Survey	·	1.2 km	MPC · JPL
671845	2014 QV	—	July 28, 2009	Kitt Peak	Spacewatch	H	440 m	MPC · JPL
671846	2014 QZ	—	September 19, 2003	Socorro	LINEAR	·	3.3 km	MPC · JPL
671847	2014 QM_{1}	—	October 11, 2007	Kitt Peak	Spacewatch	·	770 m	MPC · JPL
671848	2014 QE_{2}	—	June 7, 2014	Haleakala	Pan-STARRS 1	T_{j} (2.72)	3.9 km	MPC · JPL
671849	2014 QX_{2}	—	July 3, 2014	Haleakala	Pan-STARRS 1	·	320 m	MPC · JPL
671850	2014 QB_{3}	—	December 23, 2012	Haleakala	Pan-STARRS 1	H	460 m	MPC · JPL
671851	2014 QS_{6}	—	July 3, 2014	Haleakala	Pan-STARRS 1	·	2.7 km	MPC · JPL
671852	2014 QO_{7}	—	October 13, 2010	Mount Lemmon	Mount Lemmon Survey	·	1.8 km	MPC · JPL
671853	2014 QC_{10}	—	June 3, 2014	Haleakala	Pan-STARRS 1	·	3.1 km	MPC · JPL
671854	2014 QL_{17}	—	August 18, 2014	Haleakala	Pan-STARRS 1	·	1.6 km	MPC · JPL
671855	2014 QP_{17}	—	March 11, 2013	Kitt Peak	Spacewatch	T_{j} (2.99) · EUP	2.7 km	MPC · JPL
671856	2014 QH_{19}	—	September 28, 2008	Mount Lemmon	Mount Lemmon Survey	·	3.6 km	MPC · JPL
671857	2014 QL_{22}	—	November 8, 2010	Catalina	CSS	·	940 m	MPC · JPL
671858	2014 QQ_{29}	—	September 20, 2003	Palomar	NEAT	·	2.9 km	MPC · JPL
671859	2014 QJ_{30}	—	October 14, 2009	Mount Lemmon	Mount Lemmon Survey	·	3.7 km	MPC · JPL
671860	2014 QS_{32}	—	July 2, 2014	Haleakala	Pan-STARRS 1	H	440 m	MPC · JPL
671861	2014 QP_{34}	—	July 4, 2014	Haleakala	Pan-STARRS 1	·	750 m	MPC · JPL
671862	2014 QW_{35}	—	November 28, 2010	Kitt Peak	Spacewatch	·	2.8 km	MPC · JPL
671863	2014 QH_{45}	—	June 2, 2014	Mount Lemmon	Mount Lemmon Survey	V	550 m	MPC · JPL
671864	2014 QJ_{45}	—	August 3, 2014	Haleakala	Pan-STARRS 1	·	850 m	MPC · JPL
671865	2014 QS_{49}	—	March 12, 2007	Mount Lemmon	Mount Lemmon Survey	EOS	1.7 km	MPC · JPL
671866	2014 QU_{51}	—	July 28, 2014	Haleakala	Pan-STARRS 1	·	990 m	MPC · JPL
671867	2014 QD_{54}	—	August 30, 2009	Bergisch Gladbach	W. Bickel	·	2.9 km	MPC · JPL
671868	2014 QU_{54}	—	November 2, 2010	Kitt Peak	Spacewatch	·	2.0 km	MPC · JPL
671869	2014 QM_{55}	—	June 29, 2014	Haleakala	Pan-STARRS 1	·	2.0 km	MPC · JPL
671870	2014 QO_{56}	—	November 5, 2010	Mount Lemmon	Mount Lemmon Survey	EOS	1.6 km	MPC · JPL
671871	2014 QS_{56}	—	March 17, 2007	Kitt Peak	Spacewatch	EOS	1.8 km	MPC · JPL
671872	2014 QO_{57}	—	September 16, 2009	Kitt Peak	Spacewatch	HYG	2.0 km	MPC · JPL
671873	2014 QU_{58}	—	June 29, 2014	Haleakala	Pan-STARRS 1	·	2.7 km	MPC · JPL
671874	2014 QG_{61}	—	July 7, 2014	Haleakala	Pan-STARRS 1	·	560 m	MPC · JPL
671875	2014 QJ_{65}	—	June 29, 2014	Haleakala	Pan-STARRS 1	PHO	900 m	MPC · JPL
671876	2014 QL_{69}	—	April 12, 2013	Haleakala	Pan-STARRS 1	·	2.6 km	MPC · JPL
671877	2014 QH_{70}	—	August 20, 2014	Haleakala	Pan-STARRS 1	·	3.2 km	MPC · JPL
671878	2014 QK_{72}	—	December 2, 2005	Mount Lemmon	Mount Lemmon Survey	EOS	1.2 km	MPC · JPL
671879	2014 QQ_{72}	—	October 1, 2011	Mount Lemmon	Mount Lemmon Survey	·	620 m	MPC · JPL
671880	2014 QR_{74}	—	July 2, 2014	Mount Lemmon	Mount Lemmon Survey	·	1.3 km	MPC · JPL
671881	2014 QE_{76}	—	October 14, 2010	Mount Lemmon	Mount Lemmon Survey	·	2.1 km	MPC · JPL
671882	2014 QQ_{76}	—	September 15, 2003	Haleakala	NEAT	·	2.8 km	MPC · JPL
671883	2014 QD_{77}	—	April 13, 2013	Haleakala	Pan-STARRS 1	·	1.4 km	MPC · JPL
671884	2014 QY_{77}	—	February 17, 2007	Mount Lemmon	Mount Lemmon Survey	·	2.2 km	MPC · JPL
671885	2014 QG_{82}	—	May 7, 2014	Haleakala	Pan-STARRS 1	·	2.0 km	MPC · JPL
671886	2014 QJ_{84}	—	September 21, 2003	Kitt Peak	Spacewatch	TIR	2.2 km	MPC · JPL
671887	2014 QW_{87}	—	August 20, 2009	Kitt Peak	Spacewatch	VER	2.1 km	MPC · JPL
671888	2014 QS_{92}	—	August 20, 2014	Haleakala	Pan-STARRS 1	·	2.5 km	MPC · JPL
671889	2014 QZ_{92}	—	February 27, 2012	Haleakala	Pan-STARRS 1	EOS	1.6 km	MPC · JPL
671890	2014 QH_{93}	—	August 20, 2014	Haleakala	Pan-STARRS 1	·	1.8 km	MPC · JPL
671891	2014 QW_{93}	—	August 20, 2014	Haleakala	Pan-STARRS 1	·	2.0 km	MPC · JPL
671892	2014 QO_{94}	—	August 20, 2014	Haleakala	Pan-STARRS 1	·	830 m	MPC · JPL
671893	2014 QR_{95}	—	June 30, 2014	Haleakala	Pan-STARRS 1	·	2.1 km	MPC · JPL
671894	2014 QL_{97}	—	October 3, 2003	Kitt Peak	Spacewatch	·	1 km	MPC · JPL
671895	2014 QB_{98}	—	October 24, 2005	Mauna Kea	A. Boattini	·	3.0 km	MPC · JPL
671896	2014 QO_{99}	—	November 30, 2005	Mount Lemmon	Mount Lemmon Survey	·	2.4 km	MPC · JPL
671897	2014 QU_{100}	—	August 20, 2014	Haleakala	Pan-STARRS 1	URS	2.3 km	MPC · JPL
671898	2014 QR_{104}	—	March 31, 2008	Kitt Peak	Spacewatch	·	1.3 km	MPC · JPL
671899	2014 QK_{105}	—	February 23, 2012	Kitt Peak	Spacewatch	·	2.3 km	MPC · JPL
671900	2014 QN_{106}	—	July 30, 2014	Kitt Peak	Spacewatch	·	2.7 km	MPC · JPL

== 671901–672000 ==
back to top

Designation			Discovery			Properties		Ref
Permanent	Provisional	Named after	Date	Site	Discoverer(s)	Category	Diam.	Ref
671901	2014 QP_{108}	—	August 16, 2009	Kitt Peak	Spacewatch	·	2.2 km	MPC · JPL
671902	2014 QQ_{109}	—	March 6, 2013	Haleakala	Pan-STARRS 1	V	480 m	MPC · JPL
671903	2014 QX_{112}	—	August 20, 2014	Haleakala	Pan-STARRS 1	·	920 m	MPC · JPL
671904	2014 QO_{122}	—	March 3, 2013	Mount Lemmon	Mount Lemmon Survey	NYS	1.1 km	MPC · JPL
671905	2014 QS_{131}	—	September 27, 2009	Kitt Peak	Spacewatch	·	2.2 km	MPC · JPL
671906	2014 QY_{135}	—	February 9, 2007	Catalina	CSS	·	1.1 km	MPC · JPL
671907	2014 QZ_{136}	—	July 7, 2014	Haleakala	Pan-STARRS 1	NYS	950 m	MPC · JPL
671908	2014 QB_{144}	—	February 14, 2013	Kitt Peak	Spacewatch	·	840 m	MPC · JPL
671909	2014 QN_{144}	—	July 7, 2014	Haleakala	Pan-STARRS 1	·	760 m	MPC · JPL
671910	2014 QM_{145}	—	August 20, 2014	Haleakala	Pan-STARRS 1	·	1.1 km	MPC · JPL
671911	2014 QB_{146}	—	October 15, 2007	Mount Lemmon	Mount Lemmon Survey	·	620 m	MPC · JPL
671912	2014 QO_{146}	—	August 20, 2014	Haleakala	Pan-STARRS 1	·	740 m	MPC · JPL
671913	2014 QL_{148}	—	August 28, 2006	Lulin	LUSS	H	500 m	MPC · JPL
671914	2014 QU_{149}	—	October 13, 2007	Kitt Peak	Spacewatch	·	860 m	MPC · JPL
671915	2014 QB_{150}	—	March 2, 2013	Kitt Peak	Spacewatch	·	1.1 km	MPC · JPL
671916	2014 QQ_{150}	—	August 20, 2014	Haleakala	Pan-STARRS 1	·	900 m	MPC · JPL
671917	2014 QO_{151}	—	August 6, 2014	Haleakala	Pan-STARRS 1	EUN	820 m	MPC · JPL
671918	2014 QW_{154}	—	April 13, 2013	Haleakala	Pan-STARRS 1	·	2.6 km	MPC · JPL
671919	2014 QN_{155}	—	August 17, 2009	Kitt Peak	Spacewatch	·	3.3 km	MPC · JPL
671920	2014 QY_{155}	—	April 13, 2013	Haleakala	Pan-STARRS 1	·	2.6 km	MPC · JPL
671921	2014 QZ_{155}	—	March 28, 2012	Mount Lemmon	Mount Lemmon Survey	·	3.5 km	MPC · JPL
671922	2014 QT_{156}	—	September 16, 2010	Kitt Peak	Spacewatch	·	1.7 km	MPC · JPL
671923	2014 QC_{160}	—	March 13, 2007	Kitt Peak	Spacewatch	EOS	1.9 km	MPC · JPL
671924	2014 QG_{161}	—	June 27, 2014	Haleakala	Pan-STARRS 1	·	1.5 km	MPC · JPL
671925	2014 QN_{163}	—	July 29, 2014	Haleakala	Pan-STARRS 1	·	2.5 km	MPC · JPL
671926	2014 QS_{165}	—	October 23, 2004	Kitt Peak	Spacewatch	·	2.4 km	MPC · JPL
671927	2014 QY_{169}	—	August 18, 2014	Haleakala	Pan-STARRS 1	·	730 m	MPC · JPL
671928	2014 QZ_{169}	—	August 18, 2014	Haleakala	Pan-STARRS 1	·	1.0 km	MPC · JPL
671929	2014 QM_{173}	—	June 19, 2010	Mount Lemmon	Mount Lemmon Survey	·	980 m	MPC · JPL
671930	2014 QK_{179}	—	July 31, 2014	Haleakala	Pan-STARRS 1	·	480 m	MPC · JPL
671931	2014 QZ_{180}	—	January 19, 2008	Kitt Peak	Spacewatch	MAR	1.2 km	MPC · JPL
671932	2014 QF_{184}	—	December 25, 2005	Mount Lemmon	Mount Lemmon Survey	EOS	1.5 km	MPC · JPL
671933	2014 QG_{184}	—	January 8, 2000	Kitt Peak	Spacewatch	EOS	1.9 km	MPC · JPL
671934	2014 QK_{186}	—	January 2, 2011	Mount Lemmon	Mount Lemmon Survey	EOS	1.5 km	MPC · JPL
671935	2014 QT_{190}	—	December 6, 2011	Haleakala	Pan-STARRS 1	·	1.1 km	MPC · JPL
671936	2014 QM_{193}	—	April 17, 2009	Kitt Peak	Spacewatch	·	1.2 km	MPC · JPL
671937	2014 QU_{193}	—	August 22, 2014	Haleakala	Pan-STARRS 1	TIR	1.7 km	MPC · JPL
671938	2014 QW_{199}	—	January 4, 2011	Mount Lemmon	Mount Lemmon Survey	·	3.1 km	MPC · JPL
671939	2014 QD_{207}	—	June 24, 2014	Haleakala	Pan-STARRS 1	EOS	1.8 km	MPC · JPL
671940	2014 QH_{217}	—	July 28, 2014	Haleakala	Pan-STARRS 1	·	970 m	MPC · JPL
671941	2014 QM_{220}	—	August 22, 2014	Haleakala	Pan-STARRS 1	·	860 m	MPC · JPL
671942	2014 QG_{224}	—	April 19, 2013	Mount Lemmon	Mount Lemmon Survey	·	2.3 km	MPC · JPL
671943	2014 QP_{232}	—	August 20, 2014	Haleakala	Pan-STARRS 1	AGN	950 m	MPC · JPL
671944	2014 QU_{233}	—	August 22, 2014	Haleakala	Pan-STARRS 1	·	3.0 km	MPC · JPL
671945	2014 QH_{235}	—	October 12, 2005	Bergisch Gladbach	W. Bickel	·	980 m	MPC · JPL
671946	2014 QE_{236}	—	July 28, 2014	Haleakala	Pan-STARRS 1	(5)	670 m	MPC · JPL
671947	2014 QZ_{240}	—	August 22, 2014	Haleakala	Pan-STARRS 1	·	670 m	MPC · JPL
671948	2014 QQ_{241}	—	August 6, 2014	Haleakala	Pan-STARRS 1	·	920 m	MPC · JPL
671949	2014 QQ_{242}	—	December 11, 2010	Mount Lemmon	Mount Lemmon Survey	·	2.4 km	MPC · JPL
671950	2014 QF_{249}	—	April 5, 2013	Palomar	Palomar Transient Factory	·	690 m	MPC · JPL
671951	2014 QV_{251}	—	August 22, 2014	Haleakala	Pan-STARRS 1	·	530 m	MPC · JPL
671952	2014 QN_{254}	—	September 30, 2003	Apache Point	SDSS Collaboration	·	1.4 km	MPC · JPL
671953	2014 QX_{258}	—	May 1, 2003	Kitt Peak	Spacewatch	·	2.7 km	MPC · JPL
671954	2014 QC_{263}	—	August 22, 2014	Haleakala	Pan-STARRS 1	·	1.5 km	MPC · JPL
671955	2014 QG_{263}	—	January 31, 2006	Kitt Peak	Spacewatch	·	2.3 km	MPC · JPL
671956	2014 QZ_{263}	—	March 29, 2012	Haleakala	Pan-STARRS 1	·	2.5 km	MPC · JPL
671957	2014 QZ_{264}	—	October 1, 2009	Mount Lemmon	Mount Lemmon Survey	EOS	2.0 km	MPC · JPL
671958	2014 QJ_{267}	—	October 15, 2007	Mount Lemmon	Mount Lemmon Survey	·	540 m	MPC · JPL
671959	2014 QK_{267}	—	August 20, 2003	Campo Imperatore	CINEOS	·	1.0 km	MPC · JPL
671960	2014 QW_{267}	—	October 29, 2010	Kitt Peak	Spacewatch	·	960 m	MPC · JPL
671961	2014 QD_{271}	—	February 6, 2013	Kitt Peak	Spacewatch	·	2.8 km	MPC · JPL
671962	2014 QC_{272}	—	September 28, 2009	Kitt Peak	Spacewatch	·	2.5 km	MPC · JPL
671963	2014 QN_{279}	—	September 19, 2006	Kitt Peak	Spacewatch	·	1.0 km	MPC · JPL
671964	2014 QT_{279}	—	January 26, 2012	Mount Lemmon	Mount Lemmon Survey	MAS	590 m	MPC · JPL
671965	2014 QZ_{280}	—	July 25, 2014	Haleakala	Pan-STARRS 1	·	920 m	MPC · JPL
671966	2014 QN_{281}	—	August 24, 2014	Haleakala	Pan-STARRS 1	EUN	850 m	MPC · JPL
671967	2014 QO_{281}	—	August 24, 2014	Haleakala	Pan-STARRS 1	·	1.2 km	MPC · JPL
671968	2014 QT_{293}	—	August 25, 2014	Haleakala	Pan-STARRS 1	H	350 m	MPC · JPL
671969	2014 QN_{295}	—	March 13, 2013	Haleakala	Pan-STARRS 1	T_{j} (2.94)	4.0 km	MPC · JPL
671970	2014 QO_{296}	—	August 20, 2014	Haleakala	Pan-STARRS 1	APO · PHA	350 m	MPC · JPL
671971	2014 QY_{299}	—	February 27, 2012	Haleakala	Pan-STARRS 1	·	1.6 km	MPC · JPL
671972	2014 QG_{300}	—	August 20, 2014	Haleakala	Pan-STARRS 1	·	1.1 km	MPC · JPL
671973	2014 QE_{307}	—	October 1, 2005	Mount Lemmon	Mount Lemmon Survey	EUN	830 m	MPC · JPL
671974	2014 QF_{307}	—	August 28, 2005	Kitt Peak	Spacewatch	·	1.2 km	MPC · JPL
671975	2014 QO_{307}	—	March 3, 2009	Mount Lemmon	Mount Lemmon Survey	·	1.2 km	MPC · JPL
671976	2014 QV_{309}	—	September 20, 2009	Mount Lemmon	Mount Lemmon Survey	·	2.8 km	MPC · JPL
671977	2014 QJ_{311}	—	July 1, 2014	Haleakala	Pan-STARRS 1	PHO	770 m	MPC · JPL
671978	2014 QF_{312}	—	June 2, 2014	Haleakala	Pan-STARRS 1	·	510 m	MPC · JPL
671979	2014 QP_{312}	—	January 6, 2012	Kitt Peak	Spacewatch	·	2.3 km	MPC · JPL
671980	2014 QU_{314}	—	June 5, 2014	Haleakala	Pan-STARRS 1	·	2.1 km	MPC · JPL
671981	2014 QG_{321}	—	February 28, 2012	Haleakala	Pan-STARRS 1	·	2.6 km	MPC · JPL
671982	2014 QR_{321}	—	August 25, 2014	Haleakala	Pan-STARRS 1	H	350 m	MPC · JPL
671983	2014 QF_{324}	—	August 25, 2014	Haleakala	Pan-STARRS 1	·	1.7 km	MPC · JPL
671984	2014 QU_{324}	—	August 25, 2014	Haleakala	Pan-STARRS 1	KOR	1.1 km	MPC · JPL
671985	2014 QL_{327}	—	September 7, 2008	Mount Lemmon	Mount Lemmon Survey	·	2.6 km	MPC · JPL
671986	2014 QW_{327}	—	September 18, 2003	Anderson Mesa	LONEOS	·	1.3 km	MPC · JPL
671987	2014 QK_{328}	—	September 29, 2010	Vail-Jarnac	Glinos, T.	·	1.2 km	MPC · JPL
671988	2014 QZ_{328}	—	August 25, 2014	Haleakala	Pan-STARRS 1	·	2.2 km	MPC · JPL
671989	2014 QE_{329}	—	August 25, 2014	Haleakala	Pan-STARRS 1	·	820 m	MPC · JPL
671990	2014 QT_{330}	—	August 25, 2014	Haleakala	Pan-STARRS 1	·	2.2 km	MPC · JPL
671991	2014 QK_{332}	—	August 25, 2014	Haleakala	Pan-STARRS 1	·	1.5 km	MPC · JPL
671992	2014 QK_{333}	—	August 25, 2014	Haleakala	Pan-STARRS 1	·	1.0 km	MPC · JPL
671993	2014 QU_{335}	—	September 27, 2006	Kitt Peak	Spacewatch	H	390 m	MPC · JPL
671994	2014 QH_{337}	—	January 19, 2012	Haleakala	Pan-STARRS 1	·	2.6 km	MPC · JPL
671995	2014 QU_{340}	—	October 18, 2007	Mount Lemmon	Mount Lemmon Survey	·	1.0 km	MPC · JPL
671996	2014 QX_{340}	—	August 20, 2014	Haleakala	Pan-STARRS 1	V	480 m	MPC · JPL
671997	2014 QB_{342}	—	August 10, 2010	Kitt Peak	Spacewatch	·	850 m	MPC · JPL
671998	2014 QG_{343}	—	July 30, 2005	Palomar	NEAT	·	2.2 km	MPC · JPL
671999	2014 QG_{351}	—	February 5, 2011	Haleakala	Pan-STARRS 1	·	1.9 km	MPC · JPL
672000	2014 QN_{353}	—	July 31, 2014	Haleakala	Pan-STARRS 1	·	570 m	MPC · JPL

back to top

== Meaning of names ==
As minor planet discoveries are confirmed, they are given a permanent number by the IAU's Minor Planet Center (MPC), and the discoverers can then submit names for them, following the IAU's naming conventions. The list below concerns those minor planets in the specified number-range that have received names, and explains the meanings of those names.

Official naming citations of newly named small Solar System bodies are approved and published in a bulletin by IAU's Working Group for Small Bodies Nomenclature (WGSBN). Before May 2021, citations were published in MPC's Minor Planet Circulars for many decades. Recent citations can also be found on the JPL Small-Body Database (SBDB). Until his death in 2016, German astronomer Lutz D. Schmadel compiled these citations into the Dictionary of Minor Planet Names (DMP) and regularly updated the collection.

Based on Paul Herget's The Names of the Minor Planets, Schmadel also researched the unclear origin of numerous asteroids, most of which had been named prior to World War II. This article incorporates text from this source, which is in the public domain: SBDB New namings may only be added to this list below after official publication as the preannouncement of names is condemned. The WGSBN publishes a comprehensive guideline for the naming rules of non-cometary small Solar System bodies.

Named minor planet	Provisional	This minor planet was named for...	Ref · Catalog
671271 Richardadsouza	2014 HJ_{308}	Richard A. D'Souza, Indian Jesuit, has been an astronomer at the Vatican Observatory since 2016.	IAU · 671271
