= List of minor planets: 415001–416000 =

The following is a partial list of minor planets, running from minor-planet number 415001 through 416000, inclusive. The primary data for this and other partial lists is based on JPL's "Small-Body Orbital Elements" and data available from the Minor Planet Center. Critical list information is also provided by the MPC, unless otherwise specified from Lowell Observatory. A detailed description of the table's columns and additional sources are given on the main page including a complete list of every page in this series, and a statistical break-up on the dynamical classification of minor planets.

Also see the summary list of all named bodies in numerical and alphabetical order, and the corresponding naming citations for the number range of this particular list. New namings may only be added to this list after official publication, as the preannouncement of names is condemned by the Working Group for Small Bodies Nomenclature of the International Astronomical Union.

Near-Earth obj.	MBA (inner)	MBA (outer)	Centaur
Mars-crosser	MBA (middle)	Jupiter trojan	Trans-Neptunian obj.
Unclassified

== 415001–415100 ==
Designation			Discovery			Properties		Ref
Permanent	Provisional	Named after	Date	Site	Discoverer(s)	Category	Diam.	Ref
415001	2011 FS_{60}	—	March 8, 2005	Mount Lemmon	Mount Lemmon Survey	THM	2.1 km	MPC · JPL
415002	2011 FN_{63}	—	November 18, 2009	Kitt Peak	Spacewatch	·	2.1 km	MPC · JPL
415003	2011 FP_{89}	—	April 2, 2006	Kitt Peak	Spacewatch	EOS	2.4 km	MPC · JPL
415004	2011 FC_{102}	—	April 19, 2007	Mount Lemmon	Mount Lemmon Survey	DOR	2.1 km	MPC · JPL
415005	2011 FM_{105}	—	December 1, 2005	Socorro	LINEAR	·	1.8 km	MPC · JPL
415006	2011 FS_{147}	—	April 26, 2006	Anderson Mesa	LONEOS	·	4.0 km	MPC · JPL
415007	2011 GW_{20}	—	November 30, 2008	Mount Lemmon	Mount Lemmon Survey	CYB	4.6 km	MPC · JPL
415008	2011 GS_{58}	—	April 2, 2006	Kitt Peak	Spacewatch	·	2.0 km	MPC · JPL
415009	2011 GE_{67}	—	March 15, 2010	WISE	WISE	·	3.5 km	MPC · JPL
415010	2011 HF_{22}	—	October 6, 2008	Kitt Peak	Spacewatch	EUP	3.5 km	MPC · JPL
415011	2011 HL_{34}	—	September 23, 2008	Kitt Peak	Spacewatch	LIX	5.0 km	MPC · JPL
415012	2011 HR_{36}	—	September 24, 2008	Mount Lemmon	Mount Lemmon Survey	URS	2.7 km	MPC · JPL
415013	2011 HV_{64}	—	November 24, 2003	Kitt Peak	Spacewatch	·	4.2 km	MPC · JPL
415014	2011 HD_{66}	—	October 23, 2008	Kitt Peak	Spacewatch	·	3.1 km	MPC · JPL
415015	2011 HR_{85}	—	October 23, 2003	Kitt Peak	Spacewatch	·	2.5 km	MPC · JPL
415016	2011 HT_{88}	—	October 7, 2008	Mount Lemmon	Mount Lemmon Survey	·	3.0 km	MPC · JPL
415017	2011 HS_{93}	—	April 26, 2011	Kitt Peak	Spacewatch	3:2	5.6 km	MPC · JPL
415018	2011 HC_{98}	—	November 21, 2003	Kitt Peak	Spacewatch	EUP	2.7 km	MPC · JPL
415019	2011 HJ_{102}	—	August 23, 2007	Kitt Peak	Spacewatch	CYB	3.8 km	MPC · JPL
415020	2011 JO_{2}	—	December 31, 2008	Mount Lemmon	Mount Lemmon Survey	·	4.8 km	MPC · JPL
415021	2011 JJ_{16}	—	March 4, 2005	Catalina	CSS	·	3.2 km	MPC · JPL
415022	2011 MP_{10}	—	June 26, 2011	Mount Lemmon	Mount Lemmon Survey	H	790 m	MPC · JPL
415023	2011 NC_{2}	—	January 27, 2006	Kitt Peak	Spacewatch	L5	8.6 km	MPC · JPL
415024	2011 QS_{51}	—	November 19, 2000	Socorro	LINEAR	H	850 m	MPC · JPL
415025	2011 QJ_{80}	—	July 25, 2008	Mount Lemmon	Mount Lemmon Survey	·	1 km	MPC · JPL
415026	2011 QT_{85}	—	March 28, 2008	Mount Lemmon	Mount Lemmon Survey	L5	9.2 km	MPC · JPL
415027	2011 SG_{5}	—	September 18, 2011	Catalina	CSS	APO	750 m	MPC · JPL
415028	2011 SF_{187}	—	March 9, 2007	Kitt Peak	Spacewatch	·	810 m	MPC · JPL
415029	2011 UL_{21}	—	October 17, 2011	Catalina	CSS	APO +1km · PHA	2.3 km	MPC · JPL
415030	2011 UA_{354}	—	September 29, 2011	Mount Lemmon	Mount Lemmon Survey	·	1.0 km	MPC · JPL
415031	2011 WC_{13}	—	February 26, 2010	WISE	WISE	·	1.4 km	MPC · JPL
415032	2011 WK_{75}	—	December 25, 2005	Kitt Peak	Spacewatch	·	770 m	MPC · JPL
415033	2011 WT_{77}	—	March 5, 2006	Kitt Peak	Spacewatch	·	700 m	MPC · JPL
415034	2011 WB_{141}	—	December 30, 2008	Kitt Peak	Spacewatch	·	560 m	MPC · JPL
415035	2011 YT_{4}	—	October 19, 2007	Catalina	CSS	·	1.2 km	MPC · JPL
415036	2011 YB_{24}	—	November 27, 2011	Mount Lemmon	Mount Lemmon Survey	·	800 m	MPC · JPL
415037	2011 YV_{32}	—	October 4, 2004	Kitt Peak	Spacewatch	·	800 m	MPC · JPL
415038	2011 YB_{42}	—	October 8, 2004	Kitt Peak	Spacewatch	·	750 m	MPC · JPL
415039	2011 YN_{45}	—	April 12, 2005	Mount Lemmon	Mount Lemmon Survey	NYS	1.3 km	MPC · JPL
415040	2011 YO_{45}	—	December 16, 2007	Kitt Peak	Spacewatch	·	990 m	MPC · JPL
415041	2011 YL_{48}	—	November 14, 2007	Mount Lemmon	Mount Lemmon Survey	·	1.8 km	MPC · JPL
415042	2011 YY_{58}	—	October 12, 2007	Kitt Peak	Spacewatch	MAS	590 m	MPC · JPL
415043	2011 YC_{59}	—	November 16, 2007	Mount Lemmon	Mount Lemmon Survey	V	620 m	MPC · JPL
415044	2011 YG_{61}	—	December 13, 2004	Kitt Peak	Spacewatch	V	600 m	MPC · JPL
415045	2011 YQ_{66}	—	November 3, 2007	Mount Lemmon	Mount Lemmon Survey	·	990 m	MPC · JPL
415046	2011 YO_{67}	—	February 9, 2005	Anderson Mesa	LONEOS	·	1.1 km	MPC · JPL
415047	2011 YP_{73}	—	October 14, 2007	Mount Lemmon	Mount Lemmon Survey	MAS	610 m	MPC · JPL
415048	2011 YC_{74}	—	October 8, 2004	Kitt Peak	Spacewatch	·	610 m	MPC · JPL
415049	2011 YA_{79}	—	October 7, 2004	Kitt Peak	Spacewatch	·	730 m	MPC · JPL
415050	2012 AK_{2}	—	November 11, 2004	Kitt Peak	Spacewatch	·	620 m	MPC · JPL
415051	2012 AX_{5}	—	October 23, 2003	Kitt Peak	Spacewatch	·	1.4 km	MPC · JPL
415052	2012 AW_{6}	—	November 7, 2007	Kitt Peak	Spacewatch	V	870 m	MPC · JPL
415053	2012 AR_{12}	—	December 22, 2004	Catalina	CSS	·	1.1 km	MPC · JPL
415054	2012 AE_{24}	—	December 30, 2011	Kitt Peak	Spacewatch	V	570 m	MPC · JPL
415055	2012 BC	—	May 8, 2005	Mount Lemmon	Mount Lemmon Survey	·	1.3 km	MPC · JPL
415056	2012 BC_{10}	—	March 11, 1997	Kitt Peak	Spacewatch	·	1.1 km	MPC · JPL
415057	2012 BV_{11}	—	December 18, 2004	Mount Lemmon	Mount Lemmon Survey	·	750 m	MPC · JPL
415058	2012 BH_{19}	—	October 3, 2006	Mount Lemmon	Mount Lemmon Survey	·	1.5 km	MPC · JPL
415059	2012 BP_{22}	—	March 23, 2009	XuYi	PMO NEO Survey Program	·	880 m	MPC · JPL
415060	2012 BH_{26}	—	January 6, 2005	Catalina	CSS	·	800 m	MPC · JPL
415061	2012 BW_{27}	—	December 18, 2007	Kitt Peak	Spacewatch	·	1.0 km	MPC · JPL
415062	2012 BM_{44}	—	November 20, 2003	Socorro	LINEAR	NYS	1.6 km	MPC · JPL
415063	2012 BO_{44}	—	October 12, 2007	Kitt Peak	Spacewatch	·	650 m	MPC · JPL
415064	2012 BD_{51}	—	August 20, 2010	XuYi	PMO NEO Survey Program	·	1.6 km	MPC · JPL
415065	2012 BH_{53}	—	January 11, 2008	Mount Lemmon	Mount Lemmon Survey	·	1.0 km	MPC · JPL
415066	2012 BV_{54}	—	December 4, 2007	Kitt Peak	Spacewatch	MAS	770 m	MPC · JPL
415067	2012 BE_{55}	—	November 3, 2007	Mount Lemmon	Mount Lemmon Survey	·	1.0 km	MPC · JPL
415068	2012 BL_{56}	—	April 4, 2005	Catalina	CSS	·	960 m	MPC · JPL
415069	2012 BZ_{56}	—	September 28, 2003	Kitt Peak	Spacewatch	·	1.4 km	MPC · JPL
415070	2012 BS_{59}	—	November 20, 2003	Socorro	LINEAR	·	1.1 km	MPC · JPL
415071	2012 BU_{62}	—	November 30, 2003	Kitt Peak	Spacewatch	·	1.5 km	MPC · JPL
415072	2012 BJ_{65}	—	October 15, 2007	Mount Lemmon	Mount Lemmon Survey	·	710 m	MPC · JPL
415073	2012 BZ_{67}	—	January 4, 2012	Mount Lemmon	Mount Lemmon Survey	·	1.0 km	MPC · JPL
415074	2012 BF_{70}	—	January 10, 2008	Mount Lemmon	Mount Lemmon Survey	·	830 m	MPC · JPL
415075	2012 BS_{72}	—	November 19, 2004	Catalina	CSS	·	540 m	MPC · JPL
415076	2012 BR_{80}	—	September 13, 2007	Mount Lemmon	Mount Lemmon Survey	·	630 m	MPC · JPL
415077	2012 BQ_{82}	—	December 18, 2004	Mount Lemmon	Mount Lemmon Survey	·	720 m	MPC · JPL
415078	2012 BN_{88}	—	September 28, 2006	Mount Lemmon	Mount Lemmon Survey	·	1.1 km	MPC · JPL
415079	2012 BH_{93}	—	March 26, 2009	Mount Lemmon	Mount Lemmon Survey	V	680 m	MPC · JPL
415080	2012 BN_{98}	—	March 10, 2005	Mount Lemmon	Mount Lemmon Survey	·	1.1 km	MPC · JPL
415081	2012 BX_{99}	—	December 31, 2000	Kitt Peak	Spacewatch	·	1.1 km	MPC · JPL
415082	2012 BW_{109}	—	April 7, 2005	Anderson Mesa	LONEOS	·	1.5 km	MPC · JPL
415083	2012 BH_{110}	—	February 2, 2008	Kitt Peak	Spacewatch	·	1.2 km	MPC · JPL
415084	2012 BO_{111}	—	December 15, 2003	Kitt Peak	Spacewatch	·	1.3 km	MPC · JPL
415085	2012 BZ_{111}	—	December 4, 2007	Mount Lemmon	Mount Lemmon Survey	·	1.3 km	MPC · JPL
415086	2012 BT_{112}	—	November 9, 2007	Kitt Peak	Spacewatch	·	860 m	MPC · JPL
415087	2012 BD_{113}	—	March 1, 2008	Kitt Peak	Spacewatch	·	1.4 km	MPC · JPL
415088	2012 BF_{120}	—	October 14, 2007	Mount Lemmon	Mount Lemmon Survey	·	850 m	MPC · JPL
415089	2012 BR_{124}	—	January 20, 2012	Kitt Peak	Spacewatch	·	1.3 km	MPC · JPL
415090	2012 BM_{127}	—	March 11, 2005	Mount Lemmon	Mount Lemmon Survey	·	1.3 km	MPC · JPL
415091	2012 BG_{130}	—	November 4, 2007	Kitt Peak	Spacewatch	MAS	690 m	MPC · JPL
415092	2012 BY_{134}	—	October 20, 2007	Mount Lemmon	Mount Lemmon Survey	·	1.1 km	MPC · JPL
415093	2012 BW_{140}	—	January 18, 2012	Kitt Peak	Spacewatch	PHO	840 m	MPC · JPL
415094	2012 BR_{148}	—	December 12, 2006	Kitt Peak	Spacewatch	·	1.8 km	MPC · JPL
415095	2012 BN_{151}	—	January 7, 2005	Kitt Peak	Spacewatch	·	990 m	MPC · JPL
415096	2012 BY_{151}	—	March 10, 2005	Anderson Mesa	LONEOS	·	1.3 km	MPC · JPL
415097	2012 BG_{152}	—	September 11, 2010	Catalina	CSS	V	810 m	MPC · JPL
415098	2012 CR_{6}	—	December 4, 2007	Kitt Peak	Spacewatch	·	1.2 km	MPC · JPL
415099	2012 CT_{8}	—	October 23, 2007	Kitt Peak	Spacewatch	·	640 m	MPC · JPL
415100	2012 CC_{13}	—	November 15, 2007	Mount Lemmon	Mount Lemmon Survey	·	1.0 km	MPC · JPL

== 415101–415200 ==
back to top

Designation			Discovery			Properties		Ref
Permanent	Provisional	Named after	Date	Site	Discoverer(s)	Category	Diam.	Ref
415101	2012 CF_{13}	—	February 2, 2008	Mount Lemmon	Mount Lemmon Survey	·	1.8 km	MPC · JPL
415102	2012 CD_{15}	—	January 21, 2012	Kitt Peak	Spacewatch	KON	2.1 km	MPC · JPL
415103	2012 CT_{15}	—	October 21, 2007	Mount Lemmon	Mount Lemmon Survey	·	1.1 km	MPC · JPL
415104	2012 CU_{20}	—	November 13, 2010	Mount Lemmon	Mount Lemmon Survey	·	1.8 km	MPC · JPL
415105	2012 CF_{23}	—	January 19, 2008	Mount Lemmon	Mount Lemmon Survey	·	1.6 km	MPC · JPL
415106	2012 CP_{30}	—	September 23, 2006	Kitt Peak	Spacewatch	·	1.2 km	MPC · JPL
415107	2012 CG_{34}	—	January 4, 2012	Mount Lemmon	Mount Lemmon Survey	·	1.4 km	MPC · JPL
415108	2012 CK_{34}	—	December 11, 2004	Socorro	LINEAR	·	720 m	MPC · JPL
415109	2012 CR_{35}	—	December 4, 2007	Mount Lemmon	Mount Lemmon Survey	·	1.2 km	MPC · JPL
415110	2012 CS_{41}	—	January 27, 2012	Kitt Peak	Spacewatch	·	2.5 km	MPC · JPL
415111	2012 CY_{47}	—	March 1, 2005	Kitt Peak	Spacewatch	·	650 m	MPC · JPL
415112	2012 CZ_{47}	—	December 18, 2007	Mount Lemmon	Mount Lemmon Survey	NYS	1.1 km	MPC · JPL
415113	2012 CV_{50}	—	March 10, 2005	Mount Lemmon	Mount Lemmon Survey	·	1.1 km	MPC · JPL
415114	2012 CB_{52}	—	October 18, 2003	Kitt Peak	Spacewatch	·	1.1 km	MPC · JPL
415115	2012 CG_{56}	—	November 8, 2007	Kitt Peak	Spacewatch	V	660 m	MPC · JPL
415116	2012 CY_{56}	—	November 4, 2004	Kitt Peak	Spacewatch	·	670 m	MPC · JPL
415117	2012 DC_{1}	—	October 30, 2010	Mount Lemmon	Mount Lemmon Survey	·	1.9 km	MPC · JPL
415118	2012 DG_{13}	—	November 2, 2007	Kitt Peak	Spacewatch	·	740 m	MPC · JPL
415119	2012 DJ_{15}	—	February 27, 2006	Catalina	CSS	·	4.4 km	MPC · JPL
415120	2012 DH_{18}	—	March 8, 2005	Mount Lemmon	Mount Lemmon Survey	MAS	860 m	MPC · JPL
415121	2012 DG_{19}	—	March 26, 2008	Kitt Peak	Spacewatch	·	1.6 km	MPC · JPL
415122	2012 DE_{22}	—	November 28, 1999	Kitt Peak	Spacewatch	·	1.3 km	MPC · JPL
415123	2012 DH_{27}	—	September 17, 2006	Kitt Peak	Spacewatch	·	830 m	MPC · JPL
415124	2012 DX_{29}	—	April 29, 2008	Mount Lemmon	Mount Lemmon Survey	·	1.8 km	MPC · JPL
415125	2012 DN_{32}	—	February 21, 2007	Kitt Peak	Spacewatch	·	2.1 km	MPC · JPL
415126	2012 DG_{35}	—	September 21, 2003	Kitt Peak	Spacewatch	·	1.1 km	MPC · JPL
415127	2012 DH_{35}	—	April 3, 2008	Kitt Peak	Spacewatch	MIS	2.7 km	MPC · JPL
415128	2012 DM_{36}	—	March 12, 2007	Kitt Peak	Spacewatch	·	1.7 km	MPC · JPL
415129	2012 DS_{36}	—	November 1, 2006	Kitt Peak	Spacewatch	·	1.0 km	MPC · JPL
415130	2012 DA_{38}	—	September 28, 2009	Mount Lemmon	Mount Lemmon Survey	·	2.6 km	MPC · JPL
415131	2012 DP_{38}	—	March 1, 2008	Kitt Peak	Spacewatch	HNS	1.3 km	MPC · JPL
415132	2012 DS_{38}	—	April 19, 1994	Kitt Peak	Spacewatch	·	940 m	MPC · JPL
415133	2012 DY_{39}	—	May 5, 2008	Mount Lemmon	Mount Lemmon Survey	·	1.5 km	MPC · JPL
415134	2012 DJ_{46}	—	April 14, 2008	Kitt Peak	Spacewatch	·	1.1 km	MPC · JPL
415135	2012 DO_{54}	—	September 3, 2007	Catalina	CSS	·	590 m	MPC · JPL
415136	2012 DG_{55}	—	December 1, 2003	Kitt Peak	Spacewatch	·	1.1 km	MPC · JPL
415137	2012 DY_{57}	—	April 15, 2008	Kitt Peak	Spacewatch	·	1.7 km	MPC · JPL
415138	2012 DE_{59}	—	October 23, 2003	Kitt Peak	Spacewatch	·	1.4 km	MPC · JPL
415139	2012 DM_{61}	—	January 17, 2008	Mount Lemmon	Mount Lemmon Survey	·	1.2 km	MPC · JPL
415140	2012 DV_{61}	—	October 15, 2009	Mount Lemmon	Mount Lemmon Survey	·	3.1 km	MPC · JPL
415141	2012 DF_{65}	—	November 6, 2010	Mount Lemmon	Mount Lemmon Survey	·	1.6 km	MPC · JPL
415142	2012 DY_{76}	—	January 10, 2007	Mount Lemmon	Mount Lemmon Survey	MRX	1.1 km	MPC · JPL
415143	2012 DC_{82}	—	December 18, 2007	Kitt Peak	Spacewatch	·	1.1 km	MPC · JPL
415144	2012 DC_{86}	—	August 27, 2006	Kitt Peak	Spacewatch	V	690 m	MPC · JPL
415145	2012 DS_{93}	—	April 28, 2008	Mount Lemmon	Mount Lemmon Survey	·	1.4 km	MPC · JPL
415146	2012 DM_{95}	—	February 1, 2012	Kitt Peak	Spacewatch	·	1.5 km	MPC · JPL
415147	2012 EV_{3}	—	October 13, 2006	Kitt Peak	Spacewatch	(5)	1.2 km	MPC · JPL
415148	2012 EJ_{17}	—	April 9, 2007	Kitt Peak	Spacewatch	·	4.6 km	MPC · JPL
415149	2012 FN_{2}	—	March 10, 2005	Mount Lemmon	Mount Lemmon Survey	MAS	610 m	MPC · JPL
415150	2012 FR_{2}	—	December 12, 2006	Kitt Peak	Spacewatch	·	1.7 km	MPC · JPL
415151 (22521)	2012 FS_{8}	—	October 1, 2005	Catalina	CSS	·	1.7 km	MPC · JPL
415152	2012 FU_{18}	—	October 23, 2009	Mount Lemmon	Mount Lemmon Survey	·	2.5 km	MPC · JPL
415153	2012 FE_{19}	—	November 1, 2005	Kitt Peak	Spacewatch	·	1.9 km	MPC · JPL
415154	2012 FK_{25}	—	September 23, 2005	Kitt Peak	Spacewatch	·	2.0 km	MPC · JPL
415155	2012 FP_{25}	—	April 6, 2008	Kitt Peak	Spacewatch	·	1.7 km	MPC · JPL
415156	2012 FQ_{25}	—	February 1, 2012	Mount Lemmon	Mount Lemmon Survey	HNS	1.1 km	MPC · JPL
415157	2012 FE_{26}	—	February 19, 2007	Mount Lemmon	Mount Lemmon Survey	·	2.0 km	MPC · JPL
415158	2012 FL_{28}	—	October 30, 2005	Kitt Peak	Spacewatch	WIT	860 m	MPC · JPL
415159	2012 FD_{32}	—	March 7, 2003	Socorro	LINEAR	·	2.0 km	MPC · JPL
415160	2012 FB_{35}	—	October 1, 2005	Mount Lemmon	Mount Lemmon Survey	·	1.8 km	MPC · JPL
415161	2012 FS_{36}	—	December 25, 2010	Mount Lemmon	Mount Lemmon Survey	·	2.0 km	MPC · JPL
415162	2012 FR_{38}	—	February 11, 2008	Mount Lemmon	Mount Lemmon Survey	·	1.5 km	MPC · JPL
415163	2012 FX_{38}	—	November 6, 2010	Kitt Peak	Spacewatch	·	1.7 km	MPC · JPL
415164	2012 FB_{44}	—	October 10, 1993	Kitt Peak	Spacewatch	EOS	1.9 km	MPC · JPL
415165	2012 FD_{45}	—	February 16, 2001	Kitt Peak	Spacewatch	·	1.0 km	MPC · JPL
415166	2012 FJ_{50}	—	December 19, 2003	Kitt Peak	Spacewatch	NYS	1.0 km	MPC · JPL
415167	2012 FF_{52}	—	October 1, 2005	Kitt Peak	Spacewatch	·	1.7 km	MPC · JPL
415168	2012 FV_{52}	—	February 2, 2006	Kitt Peak	Spacewatch	·	2.7 km	MPC · JPL
415169	2012 FW_{53}	—	January 3, 2011	Mount Lemmon	Mount Lemmon Survey	·	2.1 km	MPC · JPL
415170	2012 FD_{61}	—	December 13, 1999	Kitt Peak	Spacewatch	MAS	590 m	MPC · JPL
415171	2012 FW_{67}	—	January 18, 2008	Mount Lemmon	Mount Lemmon Survey	NYS	1.1 km	MPC · JPL
415172	2012 FL_{68}	—	October 2, 2010	Kitt Peak	Spacewatch	·	1.2 km	MPC · JPL
415173	2012 FS_{70}	—	March 12, 2007	Catalina	CSS	·	3.1 km	MPC · JPL
415174	2012 FX_{70}	—	September 30, 2005	Mount Lemmon	Mount Lemmon Survey	·	1.5 km	MPC · JPL
415175	2012 FC_{72}	—	March 15, 2008	Mount Lemmon	Mount Lemmon Survey	·	1.7 km	MPC · JPL
415176	2012 FE_{72}	—	October 11, 2005	Kitt Peak	Spacewatch	·	2.1 km	MPC · JPL
415177	2012 FZ_{72}	—	December 19, 2003	Kitt Peak	Spacewatch	·	1.4 km	MPC · JPL
415178	2012 FG_{75}	—	February 10, 2008	Mount Lemmon	Mount Lemmon Survey	HNS	1.5 km	MPC · JPL
415179	2012 FM_{76}	—	September 18, 2003	Kitt Peak	Spacewatch	·	4.0 km	MPC · JPL
415180	2012 FY_{77}	—	February 9, 2007	Catalina	CSS	·	3.1 km	MPC · JPL
415181	2012 FF_{78}	—	February 17, 2010	WISE	WISE	·	4.3 km	MPC · JPL
415182	2012 GA	—	September 29, 2005	Mount Lemmon	Mount Lemmon Survey	(1547)	2.0 km	MPC · JPL
415183	2012 GR_{4}	—	January 5, 2003	Socorro	LINEAR	·	1.7 km	MPC · JPL
415184	2012 GZ_{8}	—	March 12, 2007	Kitt Peak	Spacewatch	·	2.2 km	MPC · JPL
415185	2012 GT_{9}	—	November 13, 2010	Mount Lemmon	Mount Lemmon Survey	·	1.2 km	MPC · JPL
415186	2012 GP_{10}	—	September 26, 2008	Mount Lemmon	Mount Lemmon Survey	·	3.1 km	MPC · JPL
415187	2012 GE_{11}	—	February 13, 2008	Mount Lemmon	Mount Lemmon Survey	·	1.7 km	MPC · JPL
415188	2012 GZ_{12}	—	September 27, 2009	Kitt Peak	Spacewatch	EOS	1.9 km	MPC · JPL
415189	2012 GB_{14}	—	April 6, 2008	Kitt Peak	Spacewatch	·	1.6 km	MPC · JPL
415190	2012 GX_{15}	—	October 19, 2003	Kitt Peak	Spacewatch	·	3.6 km	MPC · JPL
415191	2012 GO_{20}	—	November 10, 2005	Mount Lemmon	Mount Lemmon Survey	·	2.3 km	MPC · JPL
415192	2012 GG_{24}	—	May 28, 2008	Kitt Peak	Spacewatch	EUN	1.2 km	MPC · JPL
415193	2012 GQ_{24}	—	November 15, 2010	Catalina	CSS	KON	3.0 km	MPC · JPL
415194	2012 GS_{24}	—	September 26, 2006	Kitt Peak	Spacewatch	MAS	800 m	MPC · JPL
415195	2012 GL_{25}	—	October 28, 2005	Kitt Peak	Spacewatch	MRX	1.0 km	MPC · JPL
415196	2012 GO_{25}	—	November 6, 2005	Mount Lemmon	Mount Lemmon Survey	·	2.0 km	MPC · JPL
415197	2012 GY_{34}	—	March 17, 2012	Kitt Peak	Spacewatch	·	2.5 km	MPC · JPL
415198	2012 GU_{35}	—	March 28, 2012	Kitt Peak	Spacewatch	·	2.0 km	MPC · JPL
415199	2012 GM_{39}	—	February 22, 2006	Catalina	CSS	·	3.9 km	MPC · JPL
415200	2012 GS_{39}	—	January 30, 2012	Mount Lemmon	Mount Lemmon Survey	·	2.9 km	MPC · JPL

== 415201–415300 ==
back to top

Designation			Discovery			Properties		Ref
Permanent	Provisional	Named after	Date	Site	Discoverer(s)	Category	Diam.	Ref
415201	2012 HW	—	November 14, 2010	Kitt Peak	Spacewatch	·	1.4 km	MPC · JPL
415202	2012 HH_{11}	—	April 11, 2003	Kitt Peak	Spacewatch	·	2.4 km	MPC · JPL
415203	2012 HT_{12}	—	January 4, 2010	Kitt Peak	Spacewatch	·	3.6 km	MPC · JPL
415204	2012 HZ_{14}	—	January 27, 2010	WISE	WISE	EOS	4.0 km	MPC · JPL
415205	2012 HG_{17}	—	April 18, 2012	Kitt Peak	Spacewatch	VER	3.0 km	MPC · JPL
415206	2012 HU_{18}	—	February 10, 2007	Catalina	CSS	JUN	1.3 km	MPC · JPL
415207	2012 HP_{29}	—	September 21, 2009	Kitt Peak	Spacewatch	KOR	1.2 km	MPC · JPL
415208	2012 HA_{32}	—	November 17, 2006	Mount Lemmon	Mount Lemmon Survey	·	1.5 km	MPC · JPL
415209	2012 HC_{35}	—	November 10, 2004	Kitt Peak	Spacewatch	·	2.6 km	MPC · JPL
415210	2012 HW_{38}	—	October 1, 2003	Kitt Peak	Spacewatch	·	2.5 km	MPC · JPL
415211	2012 HJ_{39}	—	October 10, 2008	Mount Lemmon	Mount Lemmon Survey	·	3.3 km	MPC · JPL
415212	2012 HV_{40}	—	February 22, 2007	Catalina	CSS	·	2.6 km	MPC · JPL
415213	2012 HX_{43}	—	March 14, 2012	Mount Lemmon	Mount Lemmon Survey	·	4.6 km	MPC · JPL
415214	2012 HQ_{44}	—	October 1, 2005	Mount Lemmon	Mount Lemmon Survey	·	1.7 km	MPC · JPL
415215	2012 HV_{49}	—	October 7, 2008	Mount Lemmon	Mount Lemmon Survey	·	3.5 km	MPC · JPL
415216	2012 HW_{49}	—	November 27, 2009	Mount Lemmon	Mount Lemmon Survey	EOS	2.4 km	MPC · JPL
415217	2012 HT_{54}	—	November 6, 2005	Mount Lemmon	Mount Lemmon Survey	·	2.6 km	MPC · JPL
415218	2012 HC_{56}	—	April 1, 2008	Kitt Peak	Spacewatch	·	1.3 km	MPC · JPL
415219	2012 HO_{60}	—	October 20, 2003	Kitt Peak	Spacewatch	·	3.6 km	MPC · JPL
415220	2012 HE_{61}	—	March 13, 2007	Mount Lemmon	Mount Lemmon Survey	EOS	2.4 km	MPC · JPL
415221	2012 HT_{62}	—	March 9, 2007	Kitt Peak	Spacewatch	HOF	3.1 km	MPC · JPL
415222	2012 HL_{65}	—	September 17, 2009	Mount Lemmon	Mount Lemmon Survey	·	4.6 km	MPC · JPL
415223	2012 HN_{65}	—	September 26, 2005	Kitt Peak	Spacewatch	ADE	2.4 km	MPC · JPL
415224	2012 HH_{66}	—	November 26, 2003	Kitt Peak	Spacewatch	VER	3.4 km	MPC · JPL
415225	2012 HP_{66}	—	May 5, 2008	Mount Lemmon	Mount Lemmon Survey	·	1.3 km	MPC · JPL
415226	2012 HM_{67}	—	February 17, 2007	Kitt Peak	Spacewatch	·	1.9 km	MPC · JPL
415227	2012 HH_{68}	—	May 22, 1998	Kitt Peak	Spacewatch	·	3.2 km	MPC · JPL
415228	2012 HS_{72}	—	November 16, 2006	Mount Lemmon	Mount Lemmon Survey	·	1.1 km	MPC · JPL
415229	2012 HM_{73}	—	November 10, 2009	Kitt Peak	Spacewatch	EOS	2.1 km	MPC · JPL
415230	2012 HT_{75}	—	February 22, 2007	Catalina	CSS	·	1.9 km	MPC · JPL
415231	2012 HY_{75}	—	December 8, 2010	Mount Lemmon	Mount Lemmon Survey	·	2.1 km	MPC · JPL
415232	2012 HS_{78}	—	October 24, 2009	Kitt Peak	Spacewatch	·	3.0 km	MPC · JPL
415233	2012 HL_{79}	—	October 8, 2008	Catalina	CSS	EOS	2.4 km	MPC · JPL
415234	2012 JB_{1}	—	September 29, 2008	Catalina	CSS	·	3.9 km	MPC · JPL
415235	2012 JZ_{3}	—	September 3, 2008	Kitt Peak	Spacewatch	EOS	1.6 km	MPC · JPL
415236	2012 JF_{9}	—	October 27, 2005	Kitt Peak	Spacewatch	·	1.4 km	MPC · JPL
415237	2012 JV_{12}	—	October 20, 2003	Socorro	LINEAR	·	3.0 km	MPC · JPL
415238	2012 JE_{13}	—	October 20, 2003	Kitt Peak	Spacewatch	EOS	2.2 km	MPC · JPL
415239	2012 JW_{16}	—	September 28, 2003	Anderson Mesa	LONEOS	·	3.4 km	MPC · JPL
415240	2012 JQ_{19}	—	March 27, 2003	Socorro	LINEAR	ADE	2.4 km	MPC · JPL
415241	2012 JR_{20}	—	November 22, 2009	Kitt Peak	Spacewatch	·	3.1 km	MPC · JPL
415242	2012 JE_{23}	—	September 29, 2008	Mount Lemmon	Mount Lemmon Survey	TIR	3.2 km	MPC · JPL
415243	2012 JN_{25}	—	November 9, 2009	Mount Lemmon	Mount Lemmon Survey	·	2.1 km	MPC · JPL
415244	2012 JO_{33}	—	November 30, 2005	Mount Lemmon	Mount Lemmon Survey	·	2.1 km	MPC · JPL
415245	2012 JD_{39}	—	October 12, 1999	Kitt Peak	Spacewatch	·	2.4 km	MPC · JPL
415246	2012 JD_{41}	—	November 30, 2003	Kitt Peak	Spacewatch	(5651)	3.6 km	MPC · JPL
415247	2012 JH_{42}	—	December 27, 2005	Mount Lemmon	Mount Lemmon Survey	·	2.2 km	MPC · JPL
415248	2012 JM_{43}	—	April 24, 2001	Kitt Peak	Spacewatch	·	2.7 km	MPC · JPL
415249	2012 JV_{44}	—	November 21, 2009	Kitt Peak	Spacewatch	VER	2.8 km	MPC · JPL
415250	2012 JX_{47}	—	November 30, 2003	Kitt Peak	Spacewatch	·	3.2 km	MPC · JPL
415251	2012 JB_{53}	—	February 23, 2011	Kitt Peak	Spacewatch	·	2.8 km	MPC · JPL
415252	2012 JC_{58}	—	February 2, 2006	Kitt Peak	Spacewatch	·	2.0 km	MPC · JPL
415253	2012 JB_{61}	—	November 5, 1999	Kitt Peak	Spacewatch	KOR	1.5 km	MPC · JPL
415254	2012 JB_{63}	—	January 16, 2011	Mount Lemmon	Mount Lemmon Survey	·	2.4 km	MPC · JPL
415255	2012 KK_{19}	—	September 4, 2008	Kitt Peak	Spacewatch	·	2.4 km	MPC · JPL
415256	2012 KG_{22}	—	March 14, 2007	Kitt Peak	Spacewatch	BRA	1.3 km	MPC · JPL
415257	2012 KY_{22}	—	November 19, 2006	Kitt Peak	Spacewatch	·	1.3 km	MPC · JPL
415258	2012 KW_{23}	—	February 25, 2006	Kitt Peak	Spacewatch	·	2.5 km	MPC · JPL
415259	2012 KA_{26}	—	September 29, 2005	Mount Lemmon	Mount Lemmon Survey	·	1.2 km	MPC · JPL
415260	2012 KR_{28}	—	April 20, 2007	Kitt Peak	Spacewatch	·	2.3 km	MPC · JPL
415261	2012 KK_{30}	—	September 24, 2008	Kitt Peak	Spacewatch	·	2.5 km	MPC · JPL
415262	2012 KQ_{49}	—	September 22, 2008	Kitt Peak	Spacewatch	·	3.1 km	MPC · JPL
415263	2012 LT_{12}	—	March 10, 2011	Mount Lemmon	Mount Lemmon Survey	·	3.9 km	MPC · JPL
415264	2012 LM_{14}	—	April 24, 2012	Mount Lemmon	Mount Lemmon Survey	·	3.1 km	MPC · JPL
415265	2012 RB_{5}	—	March 11, 2008	Kitt Peak	Spacewatch	L5	9.1 km	MPC · JPL
415266	2013 BA	—	December 21, 2012	Mount Lemmon	Mount Lemmon Survey	H	750 m	MPC · JPL
415267	2013 BQ_{45}	—	January 18, 2013	Mount Lemmon	Mount Lemmon Survey	AMO	760 m	MPC · JPL
415268	2013 CM_{89}	—	September 26, 2000	Socorro	LINEAR	·	1.4 km	MPC · JPL
415269	2013 CO_{165}	—	February 14, 2013	Kitt Peak	Spacewatch	·	1.2 km	MPC · JPL
415270	2013 CT_{170}	—	May 29, 2000	Kitt Peak	Spacewatch	·	700 m	MPC · JPL
415271	2013 CA_{190}	—	January 8, 2013	Mount Lemmon	Mount Lemmon Survey	·	910 m	MPC · JPL
415272	2013 EB_{8}	—	September 11, 2007	Kitt Peak	Spacewatch	·	620 m	MPC · JPL
415273	2013 EV_{14}	—	March 14, 2007	Mount Lemmon	Mount Lemmon Survey	·	940 m	MPC · JPL
415274	2013 EL_{45}	—	April 6, 2010	Mount Lemmon	Mount Lemmon Survey	·	700 m	MPC · JPL
415275	2013 EF_{58}	—	October 7, 2004	Kitt Peak	Spacewatch	·	810 m	MPC · JPL
415276	2013 EJ_{110}	—	February 10, 2003	Kitt Peak	Spacewatch	·	820 m	MPC · JPL
415277	2013 EJ_{122}	—	June 21, 2010	Mount Lemmon	Mount Lemmon Survey	MAS	650 m	MPC · JPL
415278	2013 EP_{123}	—	March 24, 2006	Kitt Peak	Spacewatch	·	920 m	MPC · JPL
415279	2013 FV_{7}	—	October 24, 2007	Mount Lemmon	Mount Lemmon Survey	·	890 m	MPC · JPL
415280	2013 FY_{9}	—	September 5, 2010	Mount Lemmon	Mount Lemmon Survey	NYS	1.0 km	MPC · JPL
415281	2013 FA_{15}	—	February 17, 2007	Kitt Peak	Spacewatch	·	3.5 km	MPC · JPL
415282	2013 FK_{16}	—	September 13, 2007	Mount Lemmon	Mount Lemmon Survey	·	730 m	MPC · JPL
415283	2013 FU_{19}	—	December 25, 2005	Kitt Peak	Spacewatch	·	720 m	MPC · JPL
415284	2013 FS_{20}	—	March 27, 2003	Kitt Peak	Spacewatch	·	760 m	MPC · JPL
415285	2013 FN_{23}	—	March 25, 2006	Mount Lemmon	Mount Lemmon Survey	NYS	950 m	MPC · JPL
415286	2013 GX_{3}	—	October 30, 2007	Mount Lemmon	Mount Lemmon Survey	·	790 m	MPC · JPL
415287	2013 GR_{8}	—	February 20, 2006	Kitt Peak	Spacewatch	·	920 m	MPC · JPL
415288	2013 GS_{8}	—	May 1, 2009	Mount Lemmon	Mount Lemmon Survey	·	1.3 km	MPC · JPL
415289	2013 GK_{27}	—	March 13, 2013	Kitt Peak	Spacewatch	·	700 m	MPC · JPL
415290	2013 GF_{40}	—	February 1, 2009	Kitt Peak	Spacewatch	NYS	1.1 km	MPC · JPL
415291	2013 GG_{44}	—	September 3, 2007	Catalina	CSS	·	740 m	MPC · JPL
415292	2013 GL_{44}	—	September 24, 2000	Socorro	LINEAR	·	840 m	MPC · JPL
415293	2013 GV_{47}	—	May 4, 2009	Mount Lemmon	Mount Lemmon Survey	(5)	1.1 km	MPC · JPL
415294	2013 GY_{53}	—	May 3, 2006	Kitt Peak	Spacewatch	·	870 m	MPC · JPL
415295	2013 GW_{63}	—	October 11, 2007	Mount Lemmon	Mount Lemmon Survey	·	890 m	MPC · JPL
415296	2013 GG_{68}	—	March 9, 2005	Catalina	CSS	H	590 m	MPC · JPL
415297	2013 GB_{70}	—	January 17, 2005	Kitt Peak	Spacewatch	·	2.6 km	MPC · JPL
415298	2013 GH_{72}	—	October 17, 2001	Kitt Peak	Spacewatch	(194)	2.1 km	MPC · JPL
415299	2013 GE_{79}	—	April 16, 2005	Kitt Peak	Spacewatch	·	1.0 km	MPC · JPL
415300	2013 GD_{81}	—	March 23, 1995	Kitt Peak	Spacewatch	·	860 m	MPC · JPL

== 415301–415400 ==
back to top

Designation			Discovery			Properties		Ref
Permanent	Provisional	Named after	Date	Site	Discoverer(s)	Category	Diam.	Ref
415301	2013 GS_{81}	—	March 16, 2013	Mount Lemmon	Mount Lemmon Survey	·	670 m	MPC · JPL
415302	2013 GX_{83}	—	February 4, 2005	Mount Lemmon	Mount Lemmon Survey	MAS	880 m	MPC · JPL
415303	2013 GX_{85}	—	January 17, 2009	Kitt Peak	Spacewatch	·	850 m	MPC · JPL
415304	2013 GH_{89}	—	March 3, 2009	Mount Lemmon	Mount Lemmon Survey	V	680 m	MPC · JPL
415305	2013 GT_{92}	—	November 28, 2005	Mount Lemmon	Mount Lemmon Survey	·	1.3 km	MPC · JPL
415306	2013 GJ_{99}	—	March 14, 2005	Mount Lemmon	Mount Lemmon Survey	H	610 m	MPC · JPL
415307	2013 GT_{104}	—	November 19, 2007	Kitt Peak	Spacewatch	·	1.3 km	MPC · JPL
415308	2013 GA_{109}	—	October 9, 2010	Kitt Peak	Spacewatch	RAF	830 m	MPC · JPL
415309	2013 GF_{120}	—	September 16, 2003	Kitt Peak	Spacewatch	·	1.1 km	MPC · JPL
415310	2013 GM_{120}	—	October 2, 2010	Mount Lemmon	Mount Lemmon Survey	·	2.2 km	MPC · JPL
415311	2013 GU_{127}	—	April 20, 2006	Kitt Peak	Spacewatch	V	630 m	MPC · JPL
415312	2013 GV_{130}	—	October 19, 2010	Mount Lemmon	Mount Lemmon Survey	·	1.7 km	MPC · JPL
415313	2013 HD_{1}	—	June 13, 2004	Kitt Peak	Spacewatch	·	2.6 km	MPC · JPL
415314	2013 HZ_{6}	—	January 19, 2004	Kitt Peak	Spacewatch	KON	1.9 km	MPC · JPL
415315	2013 HP_{12}	—	April 21, 2006	Kitt Peak	Spacewatch	·	1.1 km	MPC · JPL
415316	2013 HC_{13}	—	December 5, 2007	Mount Lemmon	Mount Lemmon Survey	V	700 m	MPC · JPL
415317	2013 HP_{14}	—	June 11, 2004	Socorro	LINEAR	·	2.7 km	MPC · JPL
415318	2013 HS_{14}	—	November 1, 2006	Mount Lemmon	Mount Lemmon Survey	KON	2.3 km	MPC · JPL
415319	2013 HZ_{14}	—	December 10, 1998	Kitt Peak	Spacewatch	H	790 m	MPC · JPL
415320	2013 HW_{15}	—	March 9, 2005	Kitt Peak	Spacewatch	·	1.5 km	MPC · JPL
415321	2013 HZ_{15}	—	November 28, 1999	Kitt Peak	Spacewatch	·	1.5 km	MPC · JPL
415322	2013 HF_{17}	—	January 14, 2002	Kitt Peak	Spacewatch	·	730 m	MPC · JPL
415323	2013 HG_{17}	—	March 11, 2008	Mount Lemmon	Mount Lemmon Survey	·	1.6 km	MPC · JPL
415324	2013 HB_{19}	—	April 29, 2000	Socorro	LINEAR	JUN	1.1 km	MPC · JPL
415325	2013 HO_{21}	—	May 31, 2006	Mount Lemmon	Mount Lemmon Survey	MAS	930 m	MPC · JPL
415326	2013 HD_{22}	—	September 19, 2003	Kitt Peak	Spacewatch	NYS	970 m	MPC · JPL
415327	2013 HA_{24}	—	October 15, 2007	Kitt Peak	Spacewatch	PHO	2.4 km	MPC · JPL
415328	2013 HC_{40}	—	November 20, 2004	Kitt Peak	Spacewatch	·	750 m	MPC · JPL
415329	2013 HW_{42}	—	September 18, 2003	Kitt Peak	Spacewatch	V	510 m	MPC · JPL
415330	2013 HS_{53}	—	September 18, 2003	Kitt Peak	Spacewatch	V	480 m	MPC · JPL
415331	2013 HC_{54}	—	May 10, 2002	Kitt Peak	Spacewatch	·	2.1 km	MPC · JPL
415332	2013 HN_{55}	—	October 5, 2004	Kitt Peak	Spacewatch	·	1.4 km	MPC · JPL
415333	2013 HX_{57}	—	September 30, 2003	Kitt Peak	Spacewatch	·	990 m	MPC · JPL
415334	2013 HQ_{68}	—	October 4, 2006	Mount Lemmon	Mount Lemmon Survey	·	910 m	MPC · JPL
415335	2013 HT_{70}	—	January 6, 2006	Kitt Peak	Spacewatch	·	750 m	MPC · JPL
415336	2013 HP_{77}	—	October 21, 2007	Mount Lemmon	Mount Lemmon Survey	·	790 m	MPC · JPL
415337	2013 HA_{109}	—	March 22, 2009	Mount Lemmon	Mount Lemmon Survey	·	990 m	MPC · JPL
415338	2013 HW_{110}	—	October 7, 2007	Catalina	CSS	·	740 m	MPC · JPL
415339	2013 HV_{119}	—	November 16, 2003	Catalina	CSS	NYS	1.2 km	MPC · JPL
415340	2013 HR_{125}	—	May 14, 2005	Mount Lemmon	Mount Lemmon Survey	·	1.4 km	MPC · JPL
415341	2013 JP	—	April 14, 2010	Catalina	CSS	H	650 m	MPC · JPL
415342	2013 JU	—	May 3, 2000	Socorro	LINEAR	·	850 m	MPC · JPL
415343	2013 JE_{3}	—	January 20, 2006	Kitt Peak	Spacewatch	·	890 m	MPC · JPL
415344	2013 JL_{4}	—	October 28, 2005	Kitt Peak	Spacewatch	DOR	2.3 km	MPC · JPL
415345	2013 JJ_{21}	—	February 19, 2009	Catalina	CSS	·	1.2 km	MPC · JPL
415346	2013 JU_{24}	—	September 28, 2003	Kitt Peak	Spacewatch	·	1.2 km	MPC · JPL
415347	2013 JX_{24}	—	March 26, 2006	Kitt Peak	Spacewatch	·	680 m	MPC · JPL
415348	2013 JS_{33}	—	November 1, 2010	Kitt Peak	Spacewatch	·	3.1 km	MPC · JPL
415349	2013 JN_{36}	—	November 3, 2005	Catalina	CSS	·	2.7 km	MPC · JPL
415350	2013 JS_{36}	—	June 13, 2009	Kitt Peak	Spacewatch	·	1.6 km	MPC · JPL
415351	2013 JV_{36}	—	February 20, 2002	Kitt Peak	Spacewatch	NYS	840 m	MPC · JPL
415352	2013 JN_{37}	—	June 27, 2008	Siding Spring	SSS	·	2.6 km	MPC · JPL
415353	2013 JK_{39}	—	March 16, 2009	Mount Lemmon	Mount Lemmon Survey	·	880 m	MPC · JPL
415354	2013 JE_{42}	—	November 17, 2006	Mount Lemmon	Mount Lemmon Survey	·	2.1 km	MPC · JPL
415355	2013 JF_{43}	—	September 28, 2003	Kitt Peak	Spacewatch	·	1.3 km	MPC · JPL
415356	2013 JR_{44}	—	September 2, 2010	Mount Lemmon	Mount Lemmon Survey	·	1.1 km	MPC · JPL
415357	2013 JM_{46}	—	September 3, 2010	Mount Lemmon	Mount Lemmon Survey	·	1.5 km	MPC · JPL
415358	2013 JN_{58}	—	December 24, 2011	Mount Lemmon	Mount Lemmon Survey	·	930 m	MPC · JPL
415359	2013 KD_{2}	—	November 28, 2000	Kitt Peak	Spacewatch	·	1.2 km	MPC · JPL
415360	2013 KL_{2}	—	September 7, 2004	Socorro	LINEAR	·	3.2 km	MPC · JPL
415361	2013 KR_{3}	—	October 1, 2003	Anderson Mesa	LONEOS	·	4.6 km	MPC · JPL
415362	2013 KV_{3}	—	July 15, 1993	Kitt Peak	Spacewatch	·	1.6 km	MPC · JPL
415363	2013 KQ_{5}	—	October 8, 2004	Kitt Peak	Spacewatch	·	840 m	MPC · JPL
415364	2013 KM_{9}	—	April 24, 2007	Kitt Peak	Spacewatch	T_{j} (2.97)	2.2 km	MPC · JPL
415365	2013 KW_{9}	—	November 2, 2007	Kitt Peak	Spacewatch	·	1.4 km	MPC · JPL
415366	2013 KB_{12}	—	March 2, 2009	Mount Lemmon	Mount Lemmon Survey	·	1.4 km	MPC · JPL
415367	2013 KJ_{13}	—	December 19, 2007	Mount Lemmon	Mount Lemmon Survey	·	1.2 km	MPC · JPL
415368	2013 KO_{14}	—	December 14, 2003	Kitt Peak	Spacewatch	·	1.8 km	MPC · JPL
415369	2013 KJ_{16}	—	March 18, 2009	Kitt Peak	Spacewatch	NYS	1.2 km	MPC · JPL
415370	2013 LG	—	March 7, 2008	Mount Lemmon	Mount Lemmon Survey	·	1.4 km	MPC · JPL
415371	2013 LU_{1}	—	November 7, 2010	Mount Lemmon	Mount Lemmon Survey	·	1.8 km	MPC · JPL
415372	2013 LH_{2}	—	April 5, 2003	Kitt Peak	Spacewatch	·	550 m	MPC · JPL
415373	2013 LN_{12}	—	October 13, 2010	Kitt Peak	Spacewatch	V	660 m	MPC · JPL
415374	2013 LT_{12}	—	March 12, 2007	Mount Lemmon	Mount Lemmon Survey	·	1.8 km	MPC · JPL
415375	2013 LT_{16}	—	July 28, 2009	Catalina	CSS	·	1.7 km	MPC · JPL
415376	2013 LG_{23}	—	May 13, 2004	Kitt Peak	Spacewatch	EUN	1.1 km	MPC · JPL
415377	2013 LS_{24}	—	September 11, 2010	Mount Lemmon	Mount Lemmon Survey	·	1.4 km	MPC · JPL
415378	2013 LF_{26}	—	November 26, 2003	Kitt Peak	Spacewatch	·	1.4 km	MPC · JPL
415379	2013 LY_{26}	—	September 21, 2003	Kitt Peak	Spacewatch	·	2.5 km	MPC · JPL
415380	2013 LA_{27}	—	October 19, 2007	Catalina	CSS	PHO	990 m	MPC · JPL
415381	2013 LO_{32}	—	March 29, 2008	Kitt Peak	Spacewatch	BRA	1.2 km	MPC · JPL
415382	2013 MW_{1}	—	January 14, 1996	Kitt Peak	Spacewatch	·	1.1 km	MPC · JPL
415383	2013 MN_{7}	—	May 5, 2003	Anderson Mesa	LONEOS	·	740 m	MPC · JPL
415384	2013 MZ_{9}	—	March 18, 2010	WISE	WISE	·	4.0 km	MPC · JPL
415385	2013 NO_{2}	—	September 15, 1999	Kitt Peak	Spacewatch	·	2.3 km	MPC · JPL
415386	2013 NM_{5}	—	May 11, 2007	Mount Lemmon	Mount Lemmon Survey	·	2.7 km	MPC · JPL
415387	2013 NO_{5}	—	January 30, 2011	Kitt Peak	Spacewatch	·	2.2 km	MPC · JPL
415388	2013 NQ_{10}	—	May 13, 2007	Kitt Peak	Spacewatch	·	5.1 km	MPC · JPL
415389	2013 NW_{11}	—	June 9, 2007	Catalina	CSS	T_{j} (2.96)	4.8 km	MPC · JPL
415390	2013 ND_{12}	—	May 2, 2008	Siding Spring	SSS	·	2.4 km	MPC · JPL
415391	2013 NM_{12}	—	January 16, 2010	WISE	WISE	·	3.1 km	MPC · JPL
415392	2013 NP_{12}	—	October 22, 2005	Kitt Peak	Spacewatch	·	2.2 km	MPC · JPL
415393	2013 NB_{13}	—	January 27, 2007	Kitt Peak	Spacewatch	·	2.1 km	MPC · JPL
415394	2013 NG_{13}	—	March 25, 2007	Mount Lemmon	Mount Lemmon Survey	EOS	1.8 km	MPC · JPL
415395	2013 NJ_{16}	—	October 17, 2006	Kitt Peak	Spacewatch	V	730 m	MPC · JPL
415396	2013 NV_{16}	—	November 22, 2006	Kitt Peak	Spacewatch	ADE	2.1 km	MPC · JPL
415397	2013 OG_{4}	—	February 1, 2006	Catalina	CSS	·	5.4 km	MPC · JPL
415398	2013 OW_{8}	—	April 16, 2004	Kitt Peak	Spacewatch	·	1.3 km	MPC · JPL
415399	2013 OY_{8}	—	September 3, 2008	Kitt Peak	Spacewatch	HYG	2.3 km	MPC · JPL
415400	2013 OZ_{8}	—	February 2, 2006	Mount Lemmon	Mount Lemmon Survey	·	3.1 km	MPC · JPL

== 415401–415500 ==
back to top

Designation			Discovery			Properties		Ref
Permanent	Provisional	Named after	Date	Site	Discoverer(s)	Category	Diam.	Ref
415401	2013 ON_{9}	—	June 11, 2001	Kitt Peak	Spacewatch	·	6.4 km	MPC · JPL
415402	2013 OO_{9}	—	December 28, 2005	Kitt Peak	Spacewatch	·	2.4 km	MPC · JPL
415403	2013 PF_{4}	—	November 26, 2003	Kitt Peak	Spacewatch	·	3.8 km	MPC · JPL
415404	2013 PB_{11}	—	November 9, 2009	Mount Lemmon	Mount Lemmon Survey	·	3.6 km	MPC · JPL
415405	2013 PT_{17}	—	January 27, 2011	Mount Lemmon	Mount Lemmon Survey	KOR	1.4 km	MPC · JPL
415406	2013 PD_{19}	—	November 4, 1999	Kitt Peak	Spacewatch	NYS	1.4 km	MPC · JPL
415407	2013 PJ_{22}	—	November 26, 2003	Kitt Peak	Spacewatch	·	3.1 km	MPC · JPL
415408	2013 PO_{25}	—	October 3, 2003	Kitt Peak	Spacewatch	EOS	2.3 km	MPC · JPL
415409	2013 PA_{46}	—	October 4, 2003	Kitt Peak	Spacewatch	·	2.5 km	MPC · JPL
415410	2013 PL_{47}	—	August 18, 2009	Kitt Peak	Spacewatch	·	1.7 km	MPC · JPL
415411	2013 PY_{49}	—	October 21, 2003	Kitt Peak	Spacewatch	·	2.8 km	MPC · JPL
415412	2013 PQ_{52}	—	October 1, 2008	Mount Lemmon	Mount Lemmon Survey	·	4.0 km	MPC · JPL
415413	2013 PJ_{57}	—	October 26, 2009	Mount Lemmon	Mount Lemmon Survey	·	4.2 km	MPC · JPL
415414	2013 PX_{58}	—	September 30, 2003	Kitt Peak	Spacewatch	·	3.1 km	MPC · JPL
415415	2013 PP_{60}	—	April 25, 2003	Kitt Peak	Spacewatch	·	2.4 km	MPC · JPL
415416	2013 PR_{62}	—	December 22, 2000	Kitt Peak	Spacewatch	V	790 m	MPC · JPL
415417	2013 PS_{62}	—	November 6, 2010	Mount Lemmon	Mount Lemmon Survey	·	1.5 km	MPC · JPL
415418	2013 PN_{64}	—	September 17, 2003	Kitt Peak	Spacewatch	EOS	1.6 km	MPC · JPL
415419	2013 PG_{65}	—	October 26, 2009	Mount Lemmon	Mount Lemmon Survey	·	2.3 km	MPC · JPL
415420	2013 PT_{71}	—	October 10, 2008	Mount Lemmon	Mount Lemmon Survey	·	3.2 km	MPC · JPL
415421	2013 QN	—	October 31, 1999	Kitt Peak	Spacewatch	·	1.9 km	MPC · JPL
415422	2013 QA_{7}	—	July 30, 2008	Catalina	CSS	BRA	1.6 km	MPC · JPL
415423	2013 QM_{7}	—	November 20, 2003	Kitt Peak	Spacewatch	·	4.7 km	MPC · JPL
415424	2013 QV_{11}	—	September 5, 2008	Kitt Peak	Spacewatch	·	2.5 km	MPC · JPL
415425	2013 QZ_{11}	—	March 28, 2001	Kitt Peak	Spacewatch	TEL	1.5 km	MPC · JPL
415426	2013 QP_{16}	—	December 31, 2007	Kitt Peak	Spacewatch	·	950 m	MPC · JPL
415427	2013 QQ_{18}	—	January 7, 2006	Mount Lemmon	Mount Lemmon Survey	KOR	1.5 km	MPC · JPL
415428	2013 QC_{30}	—	January 7, 2006	Mount Lemmon	Mount Lemmon Survey	·	2.9 km	MPC · JPL
415429	2013 QM_{32}	—	April 10, 2005	Catalina	CSS	PHO	3.8 km	MPC · JPL
415430	2013 QH_{40}	—	September 30, 2003	Socorro	LINEAR	EOS	2.6 km	MPC · JPL
415431	2013 QM_{63}	—	October 27, 2005	Mount Lemmon	Mount Lemmon Survey	·	1.9 km	MPC · JPL
415432	2013 QP_{63}	—	September 28, 2006	Catalina	CSS	·	1.8 km	MPC · JPL
415433	2013 QQ_{65}	—	October 5, 2004	Kitt Peak	Spacewatch	AGN	1.5 km	MPC · JPL
415434	2013 QL_{89}	—	February 25, 2011	Mount Lemmon	Mount Lemmon Survey	·	3.2 km	MPC · JPL
415435	2013 RD_{13}	—	May 8, 2006	Mount Lemmon	Mount Lemmon Survey	·	2.9 km	MPC · JPL
415436	2013 RS_{17}	—	February 14, 2005	Kitt Peak	Spacewatch	EOS	2.3 km	MPC · JPL
415437	2013 RD_{55}	—	March 5, 2006	Kitt Peak	Spacewatch	EOS	2.2 km	MPC · JPL
415438	2013 RW_{57}	—	September 21, 2008	Kitt Peak	Spacewatch	HYG	3.5 km	MPC · JPL
415439	2013 RU_{70}	—	February 16, 2004	Kitt Peak	Spacewatch	·	3.6 km	MPC · JPL
415440	2013 RQ_{88}	—	June 2, 2003	Kitt Peak	Spacewatch	3:2	5.4 km	MPC · JPL
415441	2013 SQ_{43}	—	November 6, 2005	Mount Lemmon	Mount Lemmon Survey	·	2.5 km	MPC · JPL
415442	2013 SD_{53}	—	September 6, 2008	Mount Lemmon	Mount Lemmon Survey	·	2.2 km	MPC · JPL
415443	2013 SQ_{62}	—	August 23, 2008	Kitt Peak	Spacewatch	KOR	1.6 km	MPC · JPL
415444	2013 SV_{85}	—	February 1, 2006	Kitt Peak	Spacewatch	L5	10 km	MPC · JPL
415445	2013 SX_{85}	—	February 9, 2010	Catalina	CSS	·	3.7 km	MPC · JPL
415446	2013 TX	—	October 10, 2008	Kitt Peak	Spacewatch	·	2.1 km	MPC · JPL
415447	2013 TA_{8}	—	September 29, 2008	Mount Lemmon	Mount Lemmon Survey	·	4.0 km	MPC · JPL
415448	2013 TB_{32}	—	September 9, 2004	Kitt Peak	Spacewatch	·	2.2 km	MPC · JPL
415449	2013 TG_{39}	—	March 10, 2007	Kitt Peak	Spacewatch	L5	9.2 km	MPC · JPL
415450	2013 TT_{50}	—	March 11, 2005	Mount Lemmon	Mount Lemmon Survey	·	3.3 km	MPC · JPL
415451	2013 TP_{53}	—	May 9, 2002	Kitt Peak	Spacewatch	·	2.4 km	MPC · JPL
415452	2013 TP_{65}	—	November 19, 2003	Kitt Peak	Spacewatch	EMA	4.8 km	MPC · JPL
415453	2013 TX_{88}	—	October 21, 2007	Mount Lemmon	Mount Lemmon Survey	·	4.6 km	MPC · JPL
415454	2013 TL_{105}	—	September 19, 2001	Kitt Peak	Spacewatch	L5	9.2 km	MPC · JPL
415455	2013 UQ_{12}	—	January 22, 2004	Socorro	LINEAR	EOS	2.3 km	MPC · JPL
415456	2014 HQ_{12}	—	April 2, 2006	Kitt Peak	Spacewatch	3:2	4.3 km	MPC · JPL
415457	2014 HL_{41}	—	February 27, 2006	Kitt Peak	Spacewatch	3:2 · SHU	6.6 km	MPC · JPL
415458	2014 HQ_{151}	—	March 1, 1995	Kitt Peak	Spacewatch	AGN	1.2 km	MPC · JPL
415459	2014 KE_{92}	—	December 22, 2003	Kitt Peak	Spacewatch	·	1.9 km	MPC · JPL
415460	2014 MS_{6}	—	December 27, 2003	Socorro	LINEAR	·	1.4 km	MPC · JPL
415461	2014 MU_{12}	—	August 10, 2004	Socorro	LINEAR	·	1.8 km	MPC · JPL
415462	2014 MM_{35}	—	March 1, 2009	Kitt Peak	Spacewatch	BRA	1.9 km	MPC · JPL
415463	2014 MJ_{37}	—	April 26, 2003	Kitt Peak	Spacewatch	·	780 m	MPC · JPL
415464	2014 MY_{43}	—	October 3, 2003	Kitt Peak	Spacewatch	·	1.0 km	MPC · JPL
415465	2014 MA_{53}	—	April 11, 2010	Kitt Peak	Spacewatch	BAP	900 m	MPC · JPL
415466	2014 ME_{64}	—	December 24, 2005	Kitt Peak	Spacewatch	·	900 m	MPC · JPL
415467	2014 NX_{37}	—	September 13, 2007	Kitt Peak	Spacewatch	·	900 m	MPC · JPL
415468	2014 NZ_{43}	—	June 17, 2009	Kitt Peak	Spacewatch	BRA	1.6 km	MPC · JPL
415469	2014 NL_{58}	—	May 17, 2005	Mount Lemmon	Mount Lemmon Survey	·	1.5 km	MPC · JPL
415470	2014 OR_{3}	—	September 1, 2005	Kitt Peak	Spacewatch	·	2.3 km	MPC · JPL
415471	2014 OL_{87}	—	May 6, 2006	Mount Lemmon	Mount Lemmon Survey	(260) · CYB	3.5 km	MPC · JPL
415472	2014 OE_{93}	—	September 28, 2011	Kitt Peak	Spacewatch	·	790 m	MPC · JPL
415473	2014 OC_{112}	—	October 1, 2003	Anderson Mesa	LONEOS	·	1.8 km	MPC · JPL
415474	2014 OD_{182}	—	September 4, 2007	Catalina	CSS	·	1.2 km	MPC · JPL
415475	2014 OF_{190}	—	December 11, 2006	Kitt Peak	Spacewatch	·	1.4 km	MPC · JPL
415476	2014 OC_{191}	—	March 3, 2009	Mount Lemmon	Mount Lemmon Survey	·	1.2 km	MPC · JPL
415477	2014 OQ_{191}	—	October 19, 2003	Kitt Peak	Spacewatch	THM	2.5 km	MPC · JPL
415478	2014 OP_{194}	—	August 19, 2010	XuYi	PMO NEO Survey Program	·	1.3 km	MPC · JPL
415479	2014 OE_{195}	—	September 19, 2006	Kitt Peak	Spacewatch	·	980 m	MPC · JPL
415480	2014 OJ_{195}	—	June 4, 2005	Kitt Peak	Spacewatch	·	1.4 km	MPC · JPL
415481	2014 OU_{195}	—	October 3, 1999	Kitt Peak	Spacewatch	·	1.4 km	MPC · JPL
415482	2014 OS_{196}	—	October 25, 2009	Catalina	CSS	·	2.3 km	MPC · JPL
415483	2014 OZ_{206}	—	December 22, 2005	Kitt Peak	Spacewatch	·	3.3 km	MPC · JPL
415484	2014 OY_{229}	—	April 18, 2007	Mount Lemmon	Mount Lemmon Survey	·	720 m	MPC · JPL
415485	2014 OC_{231}	—	February 4, 1995	Kitt Peak	Spacewatch	V	810 m	MPC · JPL
415486	2014 OR_{271}	—	October 28, 2006	Catalina	CSS	ADE	2.0 km	MPC · JPL
415487	2014 OO_{287}	—	March 23, 2006	Catalina	CSS	V	950 m	MPC · JPL
415488	2014 OZ_{291}	—	April 9, 2010	Mount Lemmon	Mount Lemmon Survey	·	770 m	MPC · JPL
415489	2014 OV_{293}	—	September 21, 2001	Socorro	LINEAR	·	1.7 km	MPC · JPL
415490	2014 OC_{295}	—	September 13, 2007	Mount Lemmon	Mount Lemmon Survey	·	560 m	MPC · JPL
415491	2014 OC_{296}	—	March 25, 2006	Mount Lemmon	Mount Lemmon Survey	NYS	830 m	MPC · JPL
415492	2014 OD_{298}	—	March 9, 2007	Mount Lemmon	Mount Lemmon Survey	KOR	1.3 km	MPC · JPL
415493	2014 OG_{299}	—	December 29, 2011	Kitt Peak	Spacewatch	·	1.1 km	MPC · JPL
415494	2014 OS_{299}	—	September 28, 2003	Kitt Peak	Spacewatch	THM	2.2 km	MPC · JPL
415495	2014 OC_{358}	—	April 30, 2008	Kitt Peak	Spacewatch	·	2.6 km	MPC · JPL
415496	2014 OL_{359}	—	June 29, 2005	Kitt Peak	Spacewatch	·	1.6 km	MPC · JPL
415497	2014 OE_{373}	—	September 17, 2009	Catalina	CSS	·	3.6 km	MPC · JPL
415498	2014 OG_{375}	—	April 2, 2006	Kitt Peak	Spacewatch	MAS	640 m	MPC · JPL
415499	2014 OB_{376}	—	March 1, 2008	Kitt Peak	Spacewatch	AGN	1.2 km	MPC · JPL
415500	2014 OC_{378}	—	January 29, 2009	Kitt Peak	Spacewatch	MAS	840 m	MPC · JPL

== 415501–415600 ==
back to top

Designation			Discovery			Properties		Ref
Permanent	Provisional	Named after	Date	Site	Discoverer(s)	Category	Diam.	Ref
415501	2014 PO_{7}	—	January 10, 2007	Mount Lemmon	Mount Lemmon Survey	·	1.9 km	MPC · JPL
415502	2014 PY_{7}	—	February 10, 1996	Kitt Peak	Spacewatch	ADE	2.0 km	MPC · JPL
415503	2014 PN_{24}	—	October 7, 2004	Kitt Peak	Spacewatch	·	440 m	MPC · JPL
415504	2014 PU_{32}	—	March 28, 2008	Kitt Peak	Spacewatch	AGN	1.2 km	MPC · JPL
415505	2014 PH_{39}	—	August 21, 2006	Kitt Peak	Spacewatch	·	910 m	MPC · JPL
415506	2014 PP_{39}	—	December 21, 2005	Kitt Peak	Spacewatch	KOR	1.4 km	MPC · JPL
415507	2014 PG_{41}	—	August 28, 2005	Kitt Peak	Spacewatch	·	2.1 km	MPC · JPL
415508	2014 PG_{48}	—	February 23, 2007	Kitt Peak	Spacewatch	GEF	1.1 km	MPC · JPL
415509	2014 PM_{48}	—	October 1, 2005	Kitt Peak	Spacewatch	KOR	1.5 km	MPC · JPL
415510	2014 PA_{55}	—	February 7, 2006	Kitt Peak	Spacewatch	VER	3.2 km	MPC · JPL
415511	2014 PG_{56}	—	September 26, 2006	Catalina	CSS	·	1.2 km	MPC · JPL
415512	2014 PH_{56}	—	June 20, 2010	WISE	WISE	·	1.7 km	MPC · JPL
415513	2014 PB_{63}	—	May 12, 2007	Mount Lemmon	Mount Lemmon Survey	(883)	610 m	MPC · JPL
415514	2014 PC_{65}	—	July 22, 2006	Mount Lemmon	Mount Lemmon Survey	·	1.1 km	MPC · JPL
415515	2014 PX_{69}	—	March 8, 2005	Mount Lemmon	Mount Lemmon Survey	·	1.4 km	MPC · JPL
415516	2014 QA_{1}	—	June 21, 2007	Mount Lemmon	Mount Lemmon Survey	·	770 m	MPC · JPL
415517	2014 QC_{18}	—	October 22, 2003	Kitt Peak	Spacewatch	·	960 m	MPC · JPL
415518	2014 QH_{18}	—	September 28, 1992	Kitt Peak	Spacewatch	LIX	3.4 km	MPC · JPL
415519	2014 QW_{18}	—	September 17, 2006	Catalina	CSS	·	3.0 km	MPC · JPL
415520	2014 QT_{23}	—	September 8, 2010	Kitt Peak	Spacewatch	·	1.4 km	MPC · JPL
415521	2014 QP_{25}	—	February 17, 2007	Mount Lemmon	Mount Lemmon Survey	·	1.8 km	MPC · JPL
415522	2014 QK_{28}	—	September 20, 2003	Campo Imperatore	CINEOS	·	2.3 km	MPC · JPL
415523	2014 QC_{32}	—	August 17, 2007	Siding Spring	SSS	·	1.2 km	MPC · JPL
415524	2014 QF_{32}	—	April 4, 2010	WISE	WISE	PHO	2.8 km	MPC · JPL
415525	2014 QO_{35}	—	October 6, 2011	Mount Lemmon	Mount Lemmon Survey	·	680 m	MPC · JPL
415526	2014 QS_{40}	—	January 26, 2006	Kitt Peak	Spacewatch	·	880 m	MPC · JPL
415527	2014 QA_{50}	—	February 29, 2004	Kitt Peak	Spacewatch	·	1.8 km	MPC · JPL
415528	2014 QV_{58}	—	September 19, 1995	Kitt Peak	Spacewatch	·	970 m	MPC · JPL
415529	2014 QC_{63}	—	September 9, 2007	Kitt Peak	Spacewatch	·	1.2 km	MPC · JPL
415530	2014 QS_{71}	—	May 30, 2008	Kitt Peak	Spacewatch	·	2.1 km	MPC · JPL
415531	2014 QM_{72}	—	September 25, 1995	Kitt Peak	Spacewatch	·	1.3 km	MPC · JPL
415532	2014 QA_{94}	—	October 3, 2003	Kitt Peak	Spacewatch	·	3.4 km	MPC · JPL
415533	2014 QO_{104}	—	December 13, 2006	Kitt Peak	Spacewatch	PAD	2.0 km	MPC · JPL
415534	2014 QD_{115}	—	September 16, 2001	Socorro	LINEAR	·	2.2 km	MPC · JPL
415535	2014 QN_{115}	—	January 13, 2005	Kitt Peak	Spacewatch	·	940 m	MPC · JPL
415536	2014 QO_{116}	—	March 10, 2007	Mount Lemmon	Mount Lemmon Survey	·	2.0 km	MPC · JPL
415537	2014 QX_{120}	—	September 16, 2003	Kitt Peak	Spacewatch	·	2.0 km	MPC · JPL
415538	2014 QV_{129}	—	October 10, 2007	Mount Lemmon	Mount Lemmon Survey	·	1.3 km	MPC · JPL
415539	2014 QW_{130}	—	October 22, 2005	Kitt Peak	Spacewatch	KOR	1.3 km	MPC · JPL
415540	2014 QH_{138}	—	March 12, 2003	Kitt Peak	Spacewatch	·	790 m	MPC · JPL
415541	2014 QY_{138}	—	August 26, 2009	Catalina	CSS	KOR	1.5 km	MPC · JPL
415542	2014 QF_{139}	—	April 10, 2010	Kitt Peak	Spacewatch	·	540 m	MPC · JPL
415543	2014 QU_{140}	—	December 29, 2008	Mount Lemmon	Mount Lemmon Survey	·	580 m	MPC · JPL
415544	2014 QO_{150}	—	February 29, 2008	Kitt Peak	Spacewatch	·	2.1 km	MPC · JPL
415545	2014 QU_{152}	—	May 20, 2010	Mount Lemmon	Mount Lemmon Survey	·	1.2 km	MPC · JPL
415546	2014 QB_{172}	—	February 1, 2006	Mount Lemmon	Mount Lemmon Survey	·	2.3 km	MPC · JPL
415547	2014 QL_{175}	—	February 24, 2006	Kitt Peak	Spacewatch	·	2.4 km	MPC · JPL
415548	2014 QH_{177}	—	December 22, 1998	Kitt Peak	Spacewatch	·	930 m	MPC · JPL
415549	2014 QF_{178}	—	February 18, 2004	Kitt Peak	Spacewatch	MAR	1.1 km	MPC · JPL
415550	2014 QZ_{190}	—	November 10, 2004	Kitt Peak	Spacewatch	·	940 m	MPC · JPL
415551	2014 QG_{191}	—	September 18, 2003	Kitt Peak	Spacewatch	·	2.9 km	MPC · JPL
415552	2014 QK_{196}	—	October 24, 2011	Kitt Peak	Spacewatch	V	630 m	MPC · JPL
415553	2014 QW_{201}	—	September 16, 2010	Kitt Peak	Spacewatch	·	1.5 km	MPC · JPL
415554	2014 QK_{210}	—	January 30, 2006	Kitt Peak	Spacewatch	·	2.8 km	MPC · JPL
415555	2014 QG_{212}	—	March 4, 2005	Mount Lemmon	Mount Lemmon Survey	CYB	4.2 km	MPC · JPL
415556	2014 QX_{213}	—	August 19, 2006	Kitt Peak	Spacewatch	·	1.2 km	MPC · JPL
415557	2014 QD_{217}	—	September 17, 2006	Catalina	CSS	·	930 m	MPC · JPL
415558	2014 QD_{221}	—	January 8, 2006	Mount Lemmon	Mount Lemmon Survey	·	1.7 km	MPC · JPL
415559	2014 QZ_{223}	—	August 21, 2006	Kitt Peak	Spacewatch	·	940 m	MPC · JPL
415560	2014 QK_{224}	—	December 27, 2006	Mount Lemmon	Mount Lemmon Survey	·	1.6 km	MPC · JPL
415561	2014 QB_{226}	—	September 19, 2003	Kitt Peak	Spacewatch	·	1.2 km	MPC · JPL
415562	2014 QG_{229}	—	December 21, 2003	Kitt Peak	Spacewatch	·	2.3 km	MPC · JPL
415563	2014 QQ_{233}	—	March 31, 2008	Mount Lemmon	Mount Lemmon Survey	·	1.7 km	MPC · JPL
415564	2014 QD_{234}	—	March 14, 2004	Kitt Peak	Spacewatch	·	1.3 km	MPC · JPL
415565	2014 QQ_{235}	—	September 27, 2005	Kitt Peak	Spacewatch	·	2.1 km	MPC · JPL
415566	2014 QY_{239}	—	October 1, 2005	Kitt Peak	Spacewatch	·	1.8 km	MPC · JPL
415567	2014 QS_{240}	—	October 21, 2003	Socorro	LINEAR	·	1 km	MPC · JPL
415568	2014 QX_{244}	—	April 18, 2002	Kitt Peak	Spacewatch	EOS	2.5 km	MPC · JPL
415569	2014 QR_{247}	—	October 22, 2009	Mount Lemmon	Mount Lemmon Survey	·	2.5 km	MPC · JPL
415570	2014 QG_{261}	—	September 23, 2009	Kitt Peak	Spacewatch	·	3.1 km	MPC · JPL
415571	2014 QB_{265}	—	February 2, 2005	Catalina	CSS	·	2.9 km	MPC · JPL
415572	2014 QU_{266}	—	December 10, 2004	Socorro	LINEAR	·	930 m	MPC · JPL
415573	2014 QQ_{267}	—	September 23, 2000	Socorro	LINEAR	·	880 m	MPC · JPL
415574	2014 QD_{275}	—	March 27, 2000	Kitt Peak	Spacewatch	·	670 m	MPC · JPL
415575	2014 QL_{275}	—	February 1, 2006	Kitt Peak	Spacewatch	·	680 m	MPC · JPL
415576	2014 QC_{277}	—	May 7, 2008	Kitt Peak	Spacewatch	·	2.1 km	MPC · JPL
415577	2014 QU_{277}	—	October 1, 2005	Catalina	CSS	·	2.8 km	MPC · JPL
415578	2014 QU_{282}	—	May 3, 2005	Catalina	CSS	ADE	3.1 km	MPC · JPL
415579	2014 QY_{289}	—	April 2, 2005	Kitt Peak	Spacewatch	·	1.3 km	MPC · JPL
415580	2014 QJ_{300}	—	March 20, 2007	Mount Lemmon	Mount Lemmon Survey	·	1.7 km	MPC · JPL
415581	2014 QM_{300}	—	August 23, 2007	Kitt Peak	Spacewatch	·	1.6 km	MPC · JPL
415582	2014 QR_{300}	—	December 18, 2001	Socorro	LINEAR	·	1.5 km	MPC · JPL
415583	2014 QU_{301}	—	October 31, 2005	Mount Lemmon	Mount Lemmon Survey	·	1.9 km	MPC · JPL
415584	2014 QS_{302}	—	September 11, 2007	Catalina	CSS	·	1.0 km	MPC · JPL
415585	2014 QT_{302}	—	July 30, 2008	Catalina	CSS	LIX	5.0 km	MPC · JPL
415586	2014 QC_{307}	—	October 21, 2003	Palomar	NEAT	·	4.2 km	MPC · JPL
415587	2014 QD_{308}	—	February 26, 2007	Mount Lemmon	Mount Lemmon Survey	·	2.7 km	MPC · JPL
415588	2014 QP_{308}	—	September 19, 2003	Kitt Peak	Spacewatch	·	3.2 km	MPC · JPL
415589	2014 QT_{308}	—	December 15, 2004	Kitt Peak	Spacewatch	·	750 m	MPC · JPL
415590	2014 QX_{309}	—	December 25, 2011	Catalina	CSS	·	1.8 km	MPC · JPL
415591	2014 QQ_{310}	—	September 17, 2010	Kitt Peak	Spacewatch	·	3.8 km	MPC · JPL
415592	2014 QK_{311}	—	December 17, 2007	Mount Lemmon	Mount Lemmon Survey	·	1.8 km	MPC · JPL
415593	2014 QE_{312}	—	September 29, 2005	Mount Lemmon	Mount Lemmon Survey	KOR	1.3 km	MPC · JPL
415594	2014 QH_{313}	—	October 27, 2005	Kitt Peak	Spacewatch	KOR	1.3 km	MPC · JPL
415595	2014 QB_{316}	—	March 12, 2007	Kitt Peak	Spacewatch	EOS	2.1 km	MPC · JPL
415596	2014 QW_{320}	—	October 3, 2008	Kitt Peak	Spacewatch	·	3.6 km	MPC · JPL
415597	2014 QK_{321}	—	March 27, 1995	Kitt Peak	Spacewatch	·	3.6 km	MPC · JPL
415598	2014 QF_{325}	—	September 19, 2003	Anderson Mesa	LONEOS	·	3.2 km	MPC · JPL
415599	2014 QG_{328}	—	September 21, 2003	Kitt Peak	Spacewatch	PHO	1.2 km	MPC · JPL
415600	2014 QZ_{336}	—	February 10, 2002	Socorro	LINEAR	·	890 m	MPC · JPL

== 415601–415700 ==
back to top

Designation			Discovery			Properties		Ref
Permanent	Provisional	Named after	Date	Site	Discoverer(s)	Category	Diam.	Ref
415601	2014 QK_{344}	—	August 28, 2005	Kitt Peak	Spacewatch	·	2.1 km	MPC · JPL
415602	2014 QK_{345}	—	May 15, 2005	Mount Lemmon	Mount Lemmon Survey	EUN	2.6 km	MPC · JPL
415603	2014 QN_{348}	—	March 12, 1996	Kitt Peak	Spacewatch	·	3.0 km	MPC · JPL
415604	2014 QV_{348}	—	January 17, 2005	Kitt Peak	Spacewatch	·	850 m	MPC · JPL
415605	2014 QX_{348}	—	February 1, 1995	Kitt Peak	Spacewatch	·	710 m	MPC · JPL
415606	2014 QG_{350}	—	February 27, 2006	Kitt Peak	Spacewatch	·	680 m	MPC · JPL
415607	2014 QP_{351}	—	October 30, 2005	Kitt Peak	Spacewatch	AGN	1.2 km	MPC · JPL
415608	2014 QB_{353}	—	February 13, 2011	Mount Lemmon	Mount Lemmon Survey	·	3.7 km	MPC · JPL
415609	2014 QK_{353}	—	July 5, 2010	Mount Lemmon	Mount Lemmon Survey	NYS	1.2 km	MPC · JPL
415610	2014 QK_{354}	—	October 26, 2005	Kitt Peak	Spacewatch	·	1.8 km	MPC · JPL
415611	2014 QS_{354}	—	November 10, 2004	Kitt Peak	Spacewatch	·	2.1 km	MPC · JPL
415612	2014 QN_{355}	—	October 6, 1999	Kitt Peak	Spacewatch	·	2.3 km	MPC · JPL
415613	2014 QW_{357}	—	October 21, 2003	Kitt Peak	Spacewatch	·	1.0 km	MPC · JPL
415614	2014 QM_{358}	—	October 7, 2005	Kitt Peak	Spacewatch	·	1.9 km	MPC · JPL
415615	2014 QA_{359}	—	March 31, 2009	Kitt Peak	Spacewatch	·	1.3 km	MPC · JPL
415616	2014 QL_{359}	—	October 4, 1999	Kitt Peak	Spacewatch	·	1.7 km	MPC · JPL
415617	2014 QP_{359}	—	October 27, 2005	Kitt Peak	Spacewatch	·	2.1 km	MPC · JPL
415618	2014 QD_{360}	—	June 5, 2002	Kitt Peak	Spacewatch	·	3.9 km	MPC · JPL
415619	2014 QX_{360}	—	November 30, 2003	Kitt Peak	Spacewatch	·	940 m	MPC · JPL
415620	2014 QG_{361}	—	August 23, 2007	Kitt Peak	Spacewatch	V	470 m	MPC · JPL
415621	2014 QM_{361}	—	September 30, 2003	Kitt Peak	Spacewatch	NYS	980 m	MPC · JPL
415622	2014 QJ_{367}	—	September 30, 2009	Mount Lemmon	Mount Lemmon Survey	·	2.2 km	MPC · JPL
415623	2014 QM_{367}	—	February 16, 2010	WISE	WISE	·	4.6 km	MPC · JPL
415624	2014 QW_{370}	—	July 28, 2008	Mount Lemmon	Mount Lemmon Survey	·	3.6 km	MPC · JPL
415625	2014 QD_{371}	—	October 10, 2007	Kitt Peak	Spacewatch	MAS	760 m	MPC · JPL
415626	2014 QF_{371}	—	September 18, 2003	Kitt Peak	Spacewatch	·	1.0 km	MPC · JPL
415627	2014 QJ_{371}	—	March 3, 2000	Kitt Peak	Spacewatch	·	5.3 km	MPC · JPL
415628	2014 QV_{371}	—	April 10, 2002	Socorro	LINEAR	NYS	1.5 km	MPC · JPL
415629	2014 QX_{371}	—	October 4, 1994	Kitt Peak	Spacewatch	·	660 m	MPC · JPL
415630	2014 QR_{374}	—	September 11, 2005	Kitt Peak	Spacewatch	GEF	1.1 km	MPC · JPL
415631	2014 QM_{377}	—	October 9, 2004	Kitt Peak	Spacewatch	EOS	1.8 km	MPC · JPL
415632	2014 QX_{377}	—	October 23, 2009	Kitt Peak	Spacewatch	·	2.5 km	MPC · JPL
415633	2014 QJ_{378}	—	October 29, 2003	Kitt Peak	Spacewatch	·	3.1 km	MPC · JPL
415634	2014 QX_{378}	—	September 11, 1994	Kitt Peak	Spacewatch	·	1.7 km	MPC · JPL
415635	2014 QY_{378}	—	January 6, 2006	Mount Lemmon	Mount Lemmon Survey	·	4.4 km	MPC · JPL
415636	2014 QJ_{379}	—	October 31, 2006	Mount Lemmon	Mount Lemmon Survey	(5)	1.1 km	MPC · JPL
415637	2014 QL_{379}	—	October 4, 1997	Kitt Peak	Spacewatch	·	1.7 km	MPC · JPL
415638	2014 QW_{379}	—	September 15, 2009	Kitt Peak	Spacewatch	·	2.0 km	MPC · JPL
415639	2014 QM_{380}	—	October 16, 2003	Kitt Peak	Spacewatch	·	3.7 km	MPC · JPL
415640	2014 QT_{384}	—	January 10, 2007	Mount Lemmon	Mount Lemmon Survey	AGN	1.2 km	MPC · JPL
415641	2014 QD_{385}	—	October 26, 2009	Mount Lemmon	Mount Lemmon Survey	·	2.5 km	MPC · JPL
415642	2014 QE_{385}	—	October 19, 2003	Kitt Peak	Spacewatch	·	2.3 km	MPC · JPL
415643	2014 QU_{386}	—	September 10, 2007	Mount Lemmon	Mount Lemmon Survey	·	580 m	MPC · JPL
415644	2014 QY_{387}	—	September 22, 2009	Kitt Peak	Spacewatch	EOS	2.2 km	MPC · JPL
415645	2014 QV_{389}	—	October 13, 2004	Kitt Peak	Spacewatch	·	3.2 km	MPC · JPL
415646	2014 QT_{393}	—	December 9, 2010	Mount Lemmon	Mount Lemmon Survey	·	2.8 km	MPC · JPL
415647	2014 QQ_{395}	—	October 17, 2003	Kitt Peak	Spacewatch	·	3.0 km	MPC · JPL
415648	2014 QE_{397}	—	September 26, 2005	Kitt Peak	Spacewatch	·	1.7 km	MPC · JPL
415649	2014 QE_{402}	—	February 10, 2002	Socorro	LINEAR	V	640 m	MPC · JPL
415650	2014 QB_{403}	—	March 21, 2004	Kitt Peak	Spacewatch	·	1.1 km	MPC · JPL
415651	2014 QG_{403}	—	September 16, 2003	Kitt Peak	Spacewatch	·	4.4 km	MPC · JPL
415652	2014 QX_{405}	—	November 5, 2010	Kitt Peak	Spacewatch	·	1.8 km	MPC · JPL
415653	2014 QG_{406}	—	September 19, 2006	Kitt Peak	Spacewatch	·	850 m	MPC · JPL
415654	2014 QR_{408}	—	March 18, 2004	Kitt Peak	Spacewatch	·	1.9 km	MPC · JPL
415655	2014 QV_{409}	—	May 1, 2003	Kitt Peak	Spacewatch	·	980 m	MPC · JPL
415656	2014 QF_{410}	—	August 4, 2003	Kitt Peak	Spacewatch	·	1.0 km	MPC · JPL
415657	2014 QN_{410}	—	August 23, 2007	Kitt Peak	Spacewatch	·	1.1 km	MPC · JPL
415658	2014 QO_{410}	—	August 9, 2007	Kitt Peak	Spacewatch	·	980 m	MPC · JPL
415659	2014 QT_{410}	—	November 11, 2004	Kitt Peak	Spacewatch	·	700 m	MPC · JPL
415660	2014 QF_{414}	—	August 30, 2005	Anderson Mesa	LONEOS	·	2.3 km	MPC · JPL
415661	2014 QW_{418}	—	September 19, 2003	Kitt Peak	Spacewatch	HYG	2.8 km	MPC · JPL
415662	2014 QK_{419}	—	February 12, 2000	Kitt Peak	Spacewatch	·	1.1 km	MPC · JPL
415663	2014 QZ_{419}	—	February 21, 2007	Kitt Peak	Spacewatch	KOR	1.4 km	MPC · JPL
415664	2014 QT_{420}	—	September 15, 2004	Kitt Peak	Spacewatch	·	2.4 km	MPC · JPL
415665	2014 QG_{425}	—	May 31, 2006	Kitt Peak	Spacewatch	PHO	930 m	MPC · JPL
415666	2014 QJ_{427}	—	October 23, 2009	Mount Lemmon	Mount Lemmon Survey	·	2.0 km	MPC · JPL
415667	2014 QX_{427}	—	March 19, 2004	Socorro	LINEAR	MAR	970 m	MPC · JPL
415668	2014 QC_{428}	—	September 26, 2009	Kitt Peak	Spacewatch	EOS	1.6 km	MPC · JPL
415669	2014 QN_{435}	—	February 25, 2006	Mount Lemmon	Mount Lemmon Survey	·	2.4 km	MPC · JPL
415670	2014 QO_{435}	—	January 31, 2006	Mount Lemmon	Mount Lemmon Survey	·	1.7 km	MPC · JPL
415671	2014 RR_{9}	—	August 17, 2009	Kitt Peak	Spacewatch	·	2.6 km	MPC · JPL
415672	2014 RH_{13}	—	September 18, 2009	Catalina	CSS	·	3.0 km	MPC · JPL
415673	2014 RP_{16}	—	August 20, 2004	Catalina	CSS	·	2.4 km	MPC · JPL
415674	2014 RB_{19}	—	October 15, 2007	Mount Lemmon	Mount Lemmon Survey	·	1.3 km	MPC · JPL
415675	2014 RK_{19}	—	March 26, 2006	Kitt Peak	Spacewatch	·	4.3 km	MPC · JPL
415676	2014 RZ_{19}	—	September 5, 1999	Kitt Peak	Spacewatch	·	1.7 km	MPC · JPL
415677	2014 RO_{20}	—	September 18, 2003	Kitt Peak	Spacewatch	·	3.6 km	MPC · JPL
415678	2014 RX_{21}	—	August 28, 2005	Kitt Peak	Spacewatch	MRX	880 m	MPC · JPL
415679	2014 RD_{22}	—	October 28, 1994	Kitt Peak	Spacewatch	·	1.5 km	MPC · JPL
415680	2014 RC_{23}	—	December 24, 2006	Kitt Peak	Spacewatch	·	2.7 km	MPC · JPL
415681	2014 RP_{23}	—	September 15, 2007	Mount Lemmon	Mount Lemmon Survey	·	1.4 km	MPC · JPL
415682	2014 RX_{24}	—	October 10, 2004	Socorro	LINEAR	·	740 m	MPC · JPL
415683	2014 RH_{30}	—	October 17, 2010	Mount Lemmon	Mount Lemmon Survey	WIT	820 m	MPC · JPL
415684	2014 RS_{31}	—	October 23, 2009	Mount Lemmon	Mount Lemmon Survey	HYG	2.8 km	MPC · JPL
415685	2014 RY_{33}	—	July 14, 2004	Siding Spring	SSS	·	2.7 km	MPC · JPL
415686	2014 RL_{48}	—	March 26, 2007	Mount Lemmon	Mount Lemmon Survey	·	3.5 km	MPC · JPL
415687	2014 SU_{54}	—	November 20, 2003	Kitt Peak	Spacewatch	·	1.6 km	MPC · JPL
415688	5113 T-2	—	September 25, 1973	Palomar	C. J. van Houten, I. van Houten-Groeneveld, T. Gehrels	·	1.9 km	MPC · JPL
415689	1991 JN	—	May 6, 1991	Kitt Peak	Spacewatch	H	460 m	MPC · JPL
415690	1992 UB	—	October 21, 1992	Siding Spring	R. H. McNaught	T_{j} (2.9)	2.7 km	MPC · JPL
415691	1993 SM_{6}	—	September 17, 1993	La Silla	E. W. Elst	·	1.2 km	MPC · JPL
415692	1995 SO_{9}	—	September 17, 1995	Kitt Peak	Spacewatch	·	1.6 km	MPC · JPL
415693	1995 SC_{34}	—	September 22, 1995	Kitt Peak	Spacewatch	·	1.8 km	MPC · JPL
415694	1995 SP_{42}	—	September 25, 1995	Kitt Peak	Spacewatch	MAS	570 m	MPC · JPL
415695	1996 GE_{2}	—	April 15, 1996	Haleakala	AMOS	·	2.9 km	MPC · JPL
415696	1996 GC_{5}	—	April 11, 1996	Kitt Peak	Spacewatch	·	740 m	MPC · JPL
415697	1996 TY_{16}	—	October 4, 1996	Kitt Peak	Spacewatch	·	3.2 km	MPC · JPL
415698	1996 TD_{31}	—	October 8, 1996	Kitt Peak	Spacewatch	·	840 m	MPC · JPL
415699	1996 XL_{8}	—	December 6, 1996	Kitt Peak	Spacewatch	·	1.1 km	MPC · JPL
415700	1996 XU_{23}	—	December 4, 1996	Kitt Peak	Spacewatch	·	2.3 km	MPC · JPL

== 415701–415800 ==
back to top

Designation			Discovery			Properties		Ref
Permanent	Provisional	Named after	Date	Site	Discoverer(s)	Category	Diam.	Ref
415701	1997 EJ_{1}	—	March 3, 1997	Kitt Peak	Spacewatch	·	2.2 km	MPC · JPL
415702	1997 SD_{14}	—	September 28, 1997	Kitt Peak	Spacewatch	·	3.0 km	MPC · JPL
415703	1997 US_{24}	—	October 31, 1997	Bergisch Gladbach	W. Bickel	(5)	1.5 km	MPC · JPL
415704	1998 BY_{5}	—	January 22, 1998	Kitt Peak	Spacewatch	·	1.3 km	MPC · JPL
415705	1998 HD_{10}	—	April 22, 1998	Kitt Peak	Spacewatch	EUN	1.5 km	MPC · JPL
415706	1998 RR_{21}	—	September 15, 1998	Kitt Peak	Spacewatch	·	2.0 km	MPC · JPL
415707	1998 SM_{50}	—	September 25, 1998	Kitt Peak	Spacewatch	·	1.6 km	MPC · JPL
415708	1998 SY_{97}	—	September 17, 1998	Anderson Mesa	LONEOS	·	2.0 km	MPC · JPL
415709	1998 UK_{12}	—	October 18, 1998	Kitt Peak	Spacewatch	·	2.3 km	MPC · JPL
415710	1998 WC_{2}	—	November 18, 1998	Catalina	CSS	AMO	690 m	MPC · JPL
415711	1998 WT_{7}	—	November 23, 1998	Socorro	LINEAR	AMO	350 m	MPC · JPL
415712	1998 WL_{38}	—	November 21, 1998	Kitt Peak	Spacewatch	·	3.4 km	MPC · JPL
415713	1998 XX_{2}	—	December 8, 1998	Socorro	LINEAR	ATE · PHA	360 m	MPC · JPL
415714	1998 YZ_{19}	—	December 25, 1998	Kitt Peak	Spacewatch	·	1.2 km	MPC · JPL
415715	1999 AU_{23}	—	January 9, 1999	Socorro	LINEAR	AMO +1km	840 m	MPC · JPL
415716	1999 CV_{134}	—	February 7, 1999	Kitt Peak	Spacewatch	·	2.8 km	MPC · JPL
415717	1999 CR_{140}	—	February 7, 1999	Kitt Peak	Spacewatch	TIR	3.6 km	MPC · JPL
415718	1999 FS_{87}	—	March 21, 1999	Apache Point	SDSS	·	660 m	MPC · JPL
415719	1999 HN_{7}	—	April 19, 1999	Kitt Peak	Spacewatch	·	1.5 km	MPC · JPL
415720	1999 RU_{215}	—	September 7, 1999	Mauna Kea	C. A. Trujillo, J. X. Luu, D. C. Jewitt	cubewano (hot)	165 km	MPC · JPL
415721	1999 SC	—	September 16, 1999	Prescott	P. G. Comba	·	1.1 km	MPC · JPL
415722	1999 TV_{67}	—	October 8, 1999	Kitt Peak	Spacewatch	·	1.9 km	MPC · JPL
415723	1999 TL_{134}	—	October 6, 1999	Socorro	LINEAR	·	1.3 km	MPC · JPL
415724	1999 TL_{171}	—	October 10, 1999	Socorro	LINEAR	·	1.7 km	MPC · JPL
415725	1999 TS_{294}	—	October 1, 1999	Kitt Peak	Spacewatch	·	1.1 km	MPC · JPL
415726	1999 TC_{305}	—	October 1, 1999	Kitt Peak	Spacewatch	·	1.1 km	MPC · JPL
415727	1999 TQ_{336}	—	October 13, 1999	Apache Point	SDSS	MAS	610 m	MPC · JPL
415728	1999 UF_{33}	—	October 31, 1999	Kitt Peak	Spacewatch	·	760 m	MPC · JPL
415729	1999 VL_{46}	—	November 3, 1999	Socorro	LINEAR	·	1.6 km	MPC · JPL
415730	1999 VS_{46}	—	September 17, 1999	Kitt Peak	Spacewatch	PHO	1.1 km	MPC · JPL
415731	1999 VY_{95}	—	October 10, 1999	Socorro	LINEAR	·	1.7 km	MPC · JPL
415732	1999 VY_{104}	—	November 9, 1999	Socorro	LINEAR	·	2.7 km	MPC · JPL
415733	1999 VF_{149}	—	November 2, 1999	Kitt Peak	Spacewatch	·	2.3 km	MPC · JPL
415734	1999 VO_{153}	—	November 11, 1999	Kitt Peak	Spacewatch	·	2.2 km	MPC · JPL
415735	1999 WN_{15}	—	November 29, 1999	Kitt Peak	Spacewatch	AEO	1.1 km	MPC · JPL
415736	1999 XP_{147}	—	November 29, 1999	Kitt Peak	Spacewatch	V	720 m	MPC · JPL
415737	1999 YH_{8}	—	December 15, 1999	Kitt Peak	Spacewatch	·	980 m	MPC · JPL
415738	1999 YP_{18}	—	December 29, 1999	Mauna Kea	Veillet, C.	·	940 m	MPC · JPL
415739	2000 CW_{64}	—	February 3, 2000	Socorro	LINEAR	·	1.6 km	MPC · JPL
415740	2000 DU_{1}	—	February 26, 2000	Kitt Peak	Spacewatch	NYS	1.3 km	MPC · JPL
415741	2000 DY_{113}	—	February 27, 2000	Kitt Peak	Spacewatch	·	3.4 km	MPC · JPL
415742	2000 DP_{114}	—	February 28, 2000	Kitt Peak	Spacewatch	·	1.2 km	MPC · JPL
415743	2000 EN_{78}	—	March 5, 2000	Socorro	LINEAR	·	2.8 km	MPC · JPL
415744	2000 EA_{160}	—	March 3, 2000	Socorro	LINEAR	·	2.2 km	MPC · JPL
415745	2000 GV_{147}	—	April 14, 2000	Socorro	LINEAR	APO · PHA	480 m	MPC · JPL
415746	2000 JN_{10}	—	May 7, 2000	Socorro	LINEAR	AMO +1km	900 m	MPC · JPL
415747	2000 JD_{94}	—	May 4, 2000	Apache Point	SDSS	H	550 m	MPC · JPL
415748	2000 KJ_{38}	—	May 24, 2000	Kitt Peak	Spacewatch	EOS	2.6 km	MPC · JPL
415749	2000 KE_{70}	—	May 28, 2000	Socorro	LINEAR	·	2.5 km	MPC · JPL
415750	2000 LW_{29}	—	June 5, 2000	Kitt Peak	Spacewatch	·	4.4 km	MPC · JPL
415751	2000 NE_{4}	—	June 23, 2000	Kitt Peak	Spacewatch	·	730 m	MPC · JPL
415752	2000 OB_{22}	—	July 31, 2000	Socorro	LINEAR	·	2.1 km	MPC · JPL
415753	2000 QR_{24}	—	August 25, 2000	Socorro	LINEAR	EUN	1.5 km	MPC · JPL
415754	2000 QU_{122}	—	August 25, 2000	Socorro	LINEAR	·	1.3 km	MPC · JPL
415755	2000 QB_{144}	—	August 31, 2000	Socorro	LINEAR	·	2.1 km	MPC · JPL
415756	2000 QL_{212}	—	August 31, 2000	Socorro	LINEAR	JUN	1.2 km	MPC · JPL
415757	2000 RS	—	September 1, 2000	Socorro	LINEAR	·	2.1 km	MPC · JPL
415758	2000 RO_{17}	—	September 1, 2000	Socorro	LINEAR	CLO	2.3 km	MPC · JPL
415759	2000 RA_{100}	—	September 5, 2000	Anderson Mesa	LONEOS	·	2.8 km	MPC · JPL
415760	2000 RD_{103}	—	September 5, 2000	Anderson Mesa	LONEOS	·	1.2 km	MPC · JPL
415761	2000 SF_{23}	—	September 25, 2000	Višnjan	K. Korlević	·	690 m	MPC · JPL
415762	2000 SL_{31}	—	September 24, 2000	Socorro	LINEAR	·	840 m	MPC · JPL
415763	2000 SQ_{69}	—	September 24, 2000	Socorro	LINEAR	·	1.0 km	MPC · JPL
415764	2000 SD_{70}	—	September 24, 2000	Socorro	LINEAR	DOR	2.7 km	MPC · JPL
415765	2000 SM_{129}	—	September 22, 2000	Socorro	LINEAR	·	2.6 km	MPC · JPL
415766	2000 SG_{174}	—	September 28, 2000	Socorro	LINEAR	·	950 m	MPC · JPL
415767	2000 SZ_{182}	—	September 20, 2000	Kitt Peak	Spacewatch	·	560 m	MPC · JPL
415768	2000 SP_{228}	—	September 28, 2000	Socorro	LINEAR	·	810 m	MPC · JPL
415769	2000 SU_{266}	—	September 27, 2000	Socorro	LINEAR	CLO	2.7 km	MPC · JPL
415770	2000 SJ_{342}	—	September 24, 2000	Socorro	LINEAR	·	650 m	MPC · JPL
415771	2000 TT_{26}	—	October 2, 2000	Socorro	LINEAR	·	700 m	MPC · JPL
415772	2000 TX_{67}	—	October 3, 2000	Socorro	LINEAR	·	690 m	MPC · JPL
415773	2000 UQ_{33}	—	October 31, 2000	Socorro	LINEAR	·	1.8 km	MPC · JPL
415774	2000 UY_{62}	—	October 25, 2000	Socorro	LINEAR	·	2.2 km	MPC · JPL
415775	2000 UH_{93}	—	October 25, 2000	Socorro	LINEAR	·	2.4 km	MPC · JPL
415776	2000 VQ_{1}	—	November 1, 2000	Socorro	LINEAR	·	770 m	MPC · JPL
415777	2000 VR_{6}	—	November 1, 2000	Socorro	LINEAR	·	770 m	MPC · JPL
415778	2000 VG_{19}	—	November 1, 2000	Socorro	LINEAR	·	2.7 km	MPC · JPL
415779	2000 WA_{3}	—	November 19, 2000	Socorro	LINEAR	·	3.1 km	MPC · JPL
415780	2000 WO_{10}	—	November 20, 2000	Socorro	LINEAR	·	1.1 km	MPC · JPL
415781	2000 WY_{10}	—	November 22, 2000	Kitt Peak	Spacewatch	·	2.5 km	MPC · JPL
415782	2000 WP_{14}	—	November 20, 2000	Socorro	LINEAR	·	900 m	MPC · JPL
415783	2000 WM_{27}	—	November 25, 2000	Kitt Peak	Spacewatch	·	620 m	MPC · JPL
415784	2000 WS_{51}	—	November 27, 2000	Kitt Peak	Spacewatch	·	1.6 km	MPC · JPL
415785	2000 WH_{74}	—	November 20, 2000	Socorro	LINEAR	(2076)	980 m	MPC · JPL
415786	2000 WT_{93}	—	November 21, 2000	Socorro	LINEAR	·	2.5 km	MPC · JPL
415787	2000 WK_{139}	—	November 21, 2000	Socorro	LINEAR	·	850 m	MPC · JPL
415788	2000 WZ_{176}	—	November 27, 2000	Socorro	LINEAR	·	610 m	MPC · JPL
415789	2000 WO_{193}	—	November 24, 2000	Kitt Peak	Deep Lens Survey	·	1.9 km	MPC · JPL
415790	2000 XF_{3}	—	December 1, 2000	Socorro	LINEAR	·	2.3 km	MPC · JPL
415791	2001 AR_{21}	—	January 3, 2001	Socorro	LINEAR	·	1.7 km	MPC · JPL
415792	2001 AS_{49}	—	December 22, 2000	Kitt Peak	Spacewatch	·	870 m	MPC · JPL
415793	2001 BT_{2}	—	January 18, 2001	Socorro	LINEAR	PHO	1.1 km	MPC · JPL
415794	2001 BR_{32}	—	January 20, 2001	Socorro	LINEAR	·	2.4 km	MPC · JPL
415795	2001 CE_{49}	—	February 1, 2001	Anderson Mesa	LONEOS	PHO	1.0 km	MPC · JPL
415796	2001 DD_{102}	—	February 16, 2001	Socorro	LINEAR	·	930 m	MPC · JPL
415797	2001 EP_{18}	—	March 14, 2001	Anderson Mesa	LONEOS	PHO	1.0 km	MPC · JPL
415798	2001 FB_{150}	—	February 22, 2001	Kitt Peak	Spacewatch	PHO	1.2 km	MPC · JPL
415799	2001 FY_{193}	—	March 20, 2001	Anderson Mesa	LONEOS	·	3.1 km	MPC · JPL
415800	2001 FA_{204}	—	March 21, 2001	Kitt Peak	SKADS	MAS	600 m	MPC · JPL

== 415801–415900 ==
back to top

Designation			Discovery			Properties		Ref
Permanent	Provisional	Named after	Date	Site	Discoverer(s)	Category	Diam.	Ref
415801	2001 FF_{205}	—	January 30, 2006	Kitt Peak	Spacewatch	·	1.7 km	MPC · JPL
415802	2001 JT_{2}	—	May 15, 2001	Anderson Mesa	LONEOS	·	980 m	MPC · JPL
415803	2001 MY_{25}	—	June 15, 2001	Kitt Peak	Spacewatch	·	1.2 km	MPC · JPL
415804	2001 OW_{15}	—	July 18, 2001	Palomar	NEAT	·	1.6 km	MPC · JPL
415805	2001 OW_{22}	—	July 18, 2001	Palomar	NEAT	H	720 m	MPC · JPL
415806	2001 PS	—	July 28, 2001	Haleakala	NEAT	·	1.5 km	MPC · JPL
415807	2001 PH_{24}	—	August 11, 2001	Haleakala	NEAT	·	2.1 km	MPC · JPL
415808	2001 PY_{30}	—	July 23, 2001	Haleakala	NEAT	·	1.8 km	MPC · JPL
415809	2001 PX_{31}	—	August 10, 2001	Palomar	NEAT	·	1.5 km	MPC · JPL
415810	2001 PD_{37}	—	August 11, 2001	Palomar	NEAT	·	1.6 km	MPC · JPL
415811	2001 PK_{49}	—	August 13, 2001	Palomar	NEAT	·	1.0 km	MPC · JPL
415812	2001 PT_{52}	—	August 14, 2001	Palomar	NEAT	·	1.7 km	MPC · JPL
415813	2001 PT_{65}	—	August 14, 2001	Palomar	NEAT	·	2.3 km	MPC · JPL
415814	2001 PQ_{67}	—	August 5, 2005	Siding Spring	SSS	·	1.3 km	MPC · JPL
415815	2001 QY_{48}	—	August 16, 2001	Socorro	LINEAR	·	1.2 km	MPC · JPL
415816	2001 QT_{71}	—	August 21, 2001	Emerald Lane	L. Ball	·	1.2 km	MPC · JPL
415817	2001 QW_{89}	—	August 16, 2001	Palomar	NEAT	·	1.3 km	MPC · JPL
415818	2001 QX_{151}	—	August 26, 2001	Socorro	LINEAR	·	2.1 km	MPC · JPL
415819	2001 QY_{151}	—	August 26, 2001	Socorro	LINEAR	·	2.6 km	MPC · JPL
415820	2001 QJ_{154}	—	August 30, 2001	Ondřejov	L. Kotková	·	1.5 km	MPC · JPL
415821	2001 QS_{166}	—	August 24, 2001	Haleakala	NEAT	KON	2.8 km	MPC · JPL
415822	2001 QG_{170}	—	August 23, 2001	Socorro	LINEAR	·	2.3 km	MPC · JPL
415823	2001 QE_{172}	—	August 25, 2001	Socorro	LINEAR	EUN	1.5 km	MPC · JPL
415824	2001 QD_{186}	—	August 21, 2001	Haleakala	NEAT	·	1.7 km	MPC · JPL
415825	2001 QL_{239}	—	August 24, 2001	Socorro	LINEAR	RAF	1.0 km	MPC · JPL
415826	2001 QK_{245}	—	August 24, 2001	Socorro	LINEAR	·	1.6 km	MPC · JPL
415827	2001 QX_{253}	—	August 25, 2001	Anderson Mesa	LONEOS	·	1.7 km	MPC · JPL
415828	2001 QL_{266}	—	August 20, 2001	Socorro	LINEAR	EUN	1.5 km	MPC · JPL
415829	2001 QJ_{267}	—	August 13, 2001	Haleakala	NEAT	·	1.5 km	MPC · JPL
415830	2001 RV_{4}	—	September 8, 2001	Socorro	LINEAR	·	1.4 km	MPC · JPL
415831	2001 RO_{7}	—	September 7, 2001	Socorro	LINEAR	·	1.1 km	MPC · JPL
415832	2001 RS_{14}	—	September 10, 2001	Socorro	LINEAR	·	1.3 km	MPC · JPL
415833	2001 RF_{28}	—	September 7, 2001	Socorro	LINEAR	·	1.2 km	MPC · JPL
415834	2001 RM_{42}	—	September 11, 2001	Socorro	LINEAR	BRG	1.7 km	MPC · JPL
415835	2001 RA_{62}	—	September 12, 2001	Socorro	LINEAR	·	1.7 km	MPC · JPL
415836	2001 RW_{72}	—	September 10, 2001	Socorro	LINEAR	·	1.6 km	MPC · JPL
415837	2001 RH_{83}	—	September 11, 2001	Anderson Mesa	LONEOS	·	1.3 km	MPC · JPL
415838	2001 RN_{96}	—	September 12, 2001	Kitt Peak	Spacewatch	·	1.3 km	MPC · JPL
415839	2001 RN_{116}	—	September 12, 2001	Socorro	LINEAR	·	1.4 km	MPC · JPL
415840	2001 RO_{133}	—	September 12, 2001	Socorro	LINEAR	(5)	1.2 km	MPC · JPL
415841	2001 RS_{150}	—	September 11, 2001	Anderson Mesa	LONEOS	·	670 m	MPC · JPL
415842	2001 SM_{7}	—	September 18, 2001	Kitt Peak	Spacewatch	·	1.2 km	MPC · JPL
415843	2001 SM_{18}	—	September 16, 2001	Socorro	LINEAR	·	1.7 km	MPC · JPL
415844	2001 SD_{60}	—	September 17, 2001	Socorro	LINEAR	·	1.4 km	MPC · JPL
415845	2001 SC_{65}	—	September 17, 2001	Socorro	LINEAR	·	1.6 km	MPC · JPL
415846	2001 SA_{69}	—	September 17, 2001	Socorro	LINEAR	·	1.8 km	MPC · JPL
415847	2001 SF_{74}	—	September 19, 2001	Anderson Mesa	LONEOS	RAF	1.2 km	MPC · JPL
415848	2001 SQ_{78}	—	September 19, 2001	Socorro	LINEAR	·	1.1 km	MPC · JPL
415849	2001 SR_{79}	—	September 20, 2001	Socorro	LINEAR	·	1.5 km	MPC · JPL
415850	2001 SA_{82}	—	September 20, 2001	Socorro	LINEAR	·	4.4 km	MPC · JPL
415851	2001 SH_{97}	—	September 11, 2001	Kitt Peak	Spacewatch	·	1.2 km	MPC · JPL
415852	2001 SN_{97}	—	September 20, 2001	Socorro	LINEAR	·	530 m	MPC · JPL
415853	2001 SM_{103}	—	September 20, 2001	Socorro	LINEAR	·	1.4 km	MPC · JPL
415854	2001 ST_{103}	—	September 12, 2001	Kitt Peak	Spacewatch	·	1.4 km	MPC · JPL
415855	2001 SA_{117}	—	September 11, 2001	Anderson Mesa	LONEOS	·	1.6 km	MPC · JPL
415856	2001 SB_{124}	—	September 16, 2001	Socorro	LINEAR	·	1.1 km	MPC · JPL
415857	2001 SM_{132}	—	September 16, 2001	Socorro	LINEAR	(5)	1.4 km	MPC · JPL
415858	2001 SA_{137}	—	September 16, 2001	Socorro	LINEAR	·	780 m	MPC · JPL
415859	2001 SE_{142}	—	September 16, 2001	Socorro	LINEAR	·	1.6 km	MPC · JPL
415860	2001 ST_{150}	—	September 17, 2001	Socorro	LINEAR	·	1.5 km	MPC · JPL
415861	2001 SO_{159}	—	September 17, 2001	Socorro	LINEAR	·	770 m	MPC · JPL
415862	2001 SV_{159}	—	September 17, 2001	Socorro	LINEAR	EUN	1.4 km	MPC · JPL
415863	2001 SQ_{164}	—	September 17, 2001	Socorro	LINEAR	·	1.2 km	MPC · JPL
415864	2001 SH_{172}	—	September 16, 2001	Socorro	LINEAR	(5)	1.1 km	MPC · JPL
415865	2001 SE_{173}	—	September 16, 2001	Socorro	LINEAR	·	560 m	MPC · JPL
415866	2001 SP_{194}	—	September 19, 2001	Socorro	LINEAR	·	4.1 km	MPC · JPL
415867	2001 SR_{196}	—	September 19, 2001	Socorro	LINEAR	·	3.9 km	MPC · JPL
415868	2001 SJ_{216}	—	September 19, 2001	Socorro	LINEAR	·	3.2 km	MPC · JPL
415869	2001 SD_{268}	—	September 25, 2001	Desert Eagle	W. K. Y. Yeung	·	1.5 km	MPC · JPL
415870	2001 SA_{276}	—	September 26, 2001	Socorro	LINEAR	·	1.6 km	MPC · JPL
415871	2001 SM_{278}	—	September 21, 2001	Anderson Mesa	LONEOS	·	1.5 km	MPC · JPL
415872	2001 SN_{282}	—	September 21, 2001	Socorro	LINEAR	·	800 m	MPC · JPL
415873	2001 SY_{293}	—	September 19, 2001	Socorro	LINEAR	·	1.4 km	MPC · JPL
415874	2001 SZ_{295}	—	September 8, 2001	Socorro	LINEAR	(5)	1.3 km	MPC · JPL
415875	2001 SE_{297}	—	September 12, 2001	Socorro	LINEAR	·	1.3 km	MPC · JPL
415876	2001 SY_{302}	—	August 25, 2001	Kitt Peak	Spacewatch	KON	2.0 km	MPC · JPL
415877	2001 SC_{312}	—	September 20, 2001	Socorro	LINEAR	·	1.8 km	MPC · JPL
415878	2001 SR_{323}	—	September 25, 2001	Socorro	LINEAR	EUN	1.4 km	MPC · JPL
415879	2001 SV_{324}	—	September 16, 2001	Socorro	LINEAR	·	1.4 km	MPC · JPL
415880	2001 SZ_{328}	—	September 19, 2001	Kitt Peak	Spacewatch	·	1.0 km	MPC · JPL
415881	2001 ST_{337}	—	September 20, 2001	Kitt Peak	Spacewatch	·	1.3 km	MPC · JPL
415882	2001 SJ_{340}	—	September 21, 2001	Anderson Mesa	LONEOS	CYB	4.2 km	MPC · JPL
415883	2001 SU_{353}	—	September 28, 2001	Palomar	NEAT	(5)	1.3 km	MPC · JPL
415884	2001 TU	—	October 6, 2001	Socorro	LINEAR	·	1.8 km	MPC · JPL
415885	2001 TG_{17}	—	October 14, 2001	Socorro	LINEAR	·	890 m	MPC · JPL
415886	2001 TY_{25}	—	October 14, 2001	Socorro	LINEAR	·	1.4 km	MPC · JPL
415887	2001 TV_{28}	—	October 14, 2001	Socorro	LINEAR	·	1.7 km	MPC · JPL
415888	2001 TD_{58}	—	October 13, 2001	Socorro	LINEAR	·	1.9 km	MPC · JPL
415889	2001 TJ_{85}	—	October 14, 2001	Socorro	LINEAR	·	1.4 km	MPC · JPL
415890	2001 TK_{90}	—	October 14, 2001	Socorro	LINEAR	·	1.4 km	MPC · JPL
415891	2001 TS_{92}	—	October 14, 2001	Socorro	LINEAR	BRG	1.3 km	MPC · JPL
415892	2001 TV_{97}	—	October 14, 2001	Socorro	LINEAR	·	2.2 km	MPC · JPL
415893	2001 TR_{99}	—	October 14, 2001	Socorro	LINEAR	·	1.4 km	MPC · JPL
415894	2001 TH_{140}	—	October 10, 2001	Palomar	NEAT	·	1.5 km	MPC · JPL
415895	2001 TK_{145}	—	October 10, 2001	Palomar	NEAT	·	1.6 km	MPC · JPL
415896	2001 TH_{181}	—	October 14, 2001	Socorro	LINEAR	·	980 m	MPC · JPL
415897	2001 TW_{185}	—	October 14, 2001	Socorro	LINEAR	·	1.2 km	MPC · JPL
415898	2001 TT_{192}	—	October 14, 2001	Socorro	LINEAR	·	1.8 km	MPC · JPL
415899	2001 TS_{198}	—	October 11, 2001	Socorro	LINEAR	(5)	1.4 km	MPC · JPL
415900	2001 TM_{206}	—	October 11, 2001	Socorro	LINEAR	·	1.6 km	MPC · JPL

== 415901–416000 ==
back to top

Designation			Discovery			Properties		Ref
Permanent	Provisional	Named after	Date	Site	Discoverer(s)	Category	Diam.	Ref
415901	2001 TS_{215}	—	October 13, 2001	Palomar	NEAT	·	1.7 km	MPC · JPL
415902	2001 TJ_{219}	—	October 14, 2001	Anderson Mesa	LONEOS	·	1.4 km	MPC · JPL
415903	2001 TB_{223}	—	October 14, 2001	Socorro	LINEAR	·	1.0 km	MPC · JPL
415904	2001 TZ_{227}	—	October 15, 2001	Haleakala	NEAT	·	1.6 km	MPC · JPL
415905	2001 TU_{262}	—	October 12, 2001	Palomar	NEAT	EUN	1.0 km	MPC · JPL
415906	2001 TW_{262}	—	May 13, 2012	Mount Lemmon	Mount Lemmon Survey	·	1.7 km	MPC · JPL
415907	2001 UU_{21}	—	September 10, 2001	Anderson Mesa	LONEOS	(1547)	1.9 km	MPC · JPL
415908	2001 UP_{23}	—	October 18, 2001	Socorro	LINEAR	·	2.0 km	MPC · JPL
415909	2001 UL_{28}	—	October 16, 2001	Socorro	LINEAR	·	1.2 km	MPC · JPL
415910	2001 UB_{29}	—	October 16, 2001	Socorro	LINEAR	·	1.4 km	MPC · JPL
415911	2001 UY_{41}	—	October 17, 2001	Socorro	LINEAR	·	1.6 km	MPC · JPL
415912	2001 UH_{62}	—	October 17, 2001	Socorro	LINEAR	·	1.4 km	MPC · JPL
415913	2001 UQ_{63}	—	October 18, 2001	Socorro	LINEAR	·	630 m	MPC · JPL
415914	2001 UO_{84}	—	September 20, 2001	Socorro	LINEAR	·	1.6 km	MPC · JPL
415915	2001 UC_{106}	—	October 20, 2001	Socorro	LINEAR	·	900 m	MPC · JPL
415916	2001 UP_{132}	—	October 20, 2001	Socorro	LINEAR	·	820 m	MPC · JPL
415917	2001 UH_{143}	—	October 23, 2001	Socorro	LINEAR	·	580 m	MPC · JPL
415918	2001 UH_{148}	—	October 23, 2001	Socorro	LINEAR	·	1.5 km	MPC · JPL
415919	2001 UE_{155}	—	October 23, 2001	Socorro	LINEAR	·	1.3 km	MPC · JPL
415920	2001 UB_{157}	—	October 23, 2001	Socorro	LINEAR	JUN	910 m	MPC · JPL
415921	2001 UK_{160}	—	October 23, 2001	Socorro	LINEAR	·	1.5 km	MPC · JPL
415922	2001 UV_{187}	—	October 17, 2001	Kitt Peak	Spacewatch	·	1.7 km	MPC · JPL
415923	2001 US_{190}	—	September 19, 2001	Kitt Peak	Spacewatch	·	1.1 km	MPC · JPL
415924	2001 UD_{198}	—	October 19, 2001	Palomar	NEAT	·	530 m	MPC · JPL
415925	2001 UG_{210}	—	October 21, 2001	Socorro	LINEAR	·	1.4 km	MPC · JPL
415926	2001 UA_{214}	—	October 23, 2001	Socorro	LINEAR	·	1.2 km	MPC · JPL
415927	2001 UG_{215}	—	October 23, 2001	Socorro	LINEAR	H	430 m	MPC · JPL
415928	2001 UZ_{228}	—	October 16, 2001	Palomar	NEAT	·	1.5 km	MPC · JPL
415929	2001 VV_{48}	—	November 9, 2001	Socorro	LINEAR	·	2.1 km	MPC · JPL
415930	2001 VL_{49}	—	November 10, 2001	Socorro	LINEAR	·	1.8 km	MPC · JPL
415931	2001 VQ_{58}	—	November 10, 2001	Socorro	LINEAR	MAR	1.6 km	MPC · JPL
415932	2001 VS_{68}	—	November 11, 2001	Socorro	LINEAR	JUN	1.5 km	MPC · JPL
415933	2001 VV_{78}	—	November 11, 2001	Socorro	LINEAR	H	530 m	MPC · JPL
415934	2001 VG_{103}	—	November 12, 2001	Socorro	LINEAR	EUN	1.2 km	MPC · JPL
415935	2001 VF_{112}	—	November 12, 2001	Socorro	LINEAR	·	1.4 km	MPC · JPL
415936	2001 WP_{5}	—	November 18, 2001	Haleakala	NEAT	·	1.7 km	MPC · JPL
415937	2001 WB_{6}	—	November 17, 2001	Socorro	LINEAR	·	1.2 km	MPC · JPL
415938	2001 WA_{9}	—	November 17, 2001	Socorro	LINEAR	·	1.4 km	MPC · JPL
415939	2001 WH_{11}	—	November 17, 2001	Socorro	LINEAR	·	1.1 km	MPC · JPL
415940	2001 WC_{21}	—	November 18, 2001	Socorro	LINEAR	·	1.5 km	MPC · JPL
415941	2001 WK_{41}	—	November 17, 2001	Socorro	LINEAR	·	3.0 km	MPC · JPL
415942	2001 WW_{41}	—	November 18, 2001	Socorro	LINEAR	·	1.7 km	MPC · JPL
415943	2001 WM_{54}	—	November 19, 2001	Socorro	LINEAR	·	1.8 km	MPC · JPL
415944	2001 WY_{56}	—	November 19, 2001	Socorro	LINEAR	·	1.5 km	MPC · JPL
415945	2001 WQ_{91}	—	November 21, 2001	Socorro	LINEAR	ADE	2.9 km	MPC · JPL
415946	2001 WD_{96}	—	November 20, 2001	Kitt Peak	Spacewatch	·	1.4 km	MPC · JPL
415947	2001 WS_{97}	—	November 18, 2001	Haleakala	NEAT	·	1.9 km	MPC · JPL
415948	2001 WE_{102}	—	November 18, 2001	Kitt Peak	Spacewatch	·	1.4 km	MPC · JPL
415949	2001 XY_{10}	—	December 11, 2001	Socorro	LINEAR	ATE	470 m	MPC · JPL
415950	2001 XZ_{13}	—	December 9, 2001	Socorro	LINEAR	JUN	1.3 km	MPC · JPL
415951	2001 XU_{17}	—	December 9, 2001	Socorro	LINEAR	(1547)	1.9 km	MPC · JPL
415952	2001 XG_{31}	—	December 11, 2001	Socorro	LINEAR	H	650 m	MPC · JPL
415953	2001 XM_{31}	—	December 11, 2001	Socorro	LINEAR	H	590 m	MPC · JPL
415954	2001 XZ_{38}	—	December 9, 2001	Socorro	LINEAR	·	1.9 km	MPC · JPL
415955	2001 XY_{39}	—	December 9, 2001	Socorro	LINEAR	·	4.9 km	MPC · JPL
415956	2001 XY_{75}	—	December 11, 2001	Socorro	LINEAR	·	1.4 km	MPC · JPL
415957	2001 XG_{102}	—	December 11, 2001	Socorro	LINEAR	·	1.9 km	MPC · JPL
415958	2001 XO_{103}	—	November 21, 2001	Socorro	LINEAR	H	640 m	MPC · JPL
415959	2001 XP_{110}	—	October 10, 2001	Palomar	NEAT	·	1.6 km	MPC · JPL
415960	2001 XV_{112}	—	December 11, 2001	Socorro	LINEAR	JUN	1.4 km	MPC · JPL
415961	2001 XK_{137}	—	December 14, 2001	Socorro	LINEAR	·	2.1 km	MPC · JPL
415962	2001 XL_{139}	—	December 14, 2001	Socorro	LINEAR	EUN	1.3 km	MPC · JPL
415963	2001 XN_{142}	—	November 17, 2001	Kitt Peak	Spacewatch	·	1.6 km	MPC · JPL
415964	2001 XE_{182}	—	December 14, 2001	Socorro	LINEAR	·	1.9 km	MPC · JPL
415965	2001 XA_{206}	—	December 11, 2001	Socorro	LINEAR	·	2.0 km	MPC · JPL
415966	2001 XY_{214}	—	December 13, 2001	Socorro	LINEAR	·	3.0 km	MPC · JPL
415967	2001 XG_{218}	—	November 12, 2001	Socorro	LINEAR	·	2.0 km	MPC · JPL
415968	2001 XO_{218}	—	October 15, 2001	Socorro	LINEAR	·	1.5 km	MPC · JPL
415969	2001 XJ_{221}	—	December 15, 2001	Socorro	LINEAR	·	1.7 km	MPC · JPL
415970	2001 XW_{224}	—	December 15, 2001	Socorro	LINEAR	·	2.5 km	MPC · JPL
415971	2001 XF_{228}	—	December 15, 2001	Socorro	LINEAR	(194)	1.7 km	MPC · JPL
415972	2001 XH_{248}	—	December 14, 2001	Kitt Peak	Spacewatch	·	1.1 km	MPC · JPL
415973	2001 XM_{262}	—	November 9, 2001	Socorro	LINEAR	·	2.1 km	MPC · JPL
415974	2001 YV_{1}	—	December 18, 2001	Socorro	LINEAR	H	680 m	MPC · JPL
415975	2001 YS_{2}	—	December 17, 2001	Socorro	LINEAR	·	1 km	MPC · JPL
415976	2001 YU_{29}	—	December 18, 2001	Socorro	LINEAR	·	1.8 km	MPC · JPL
415977	2001 YZ_{71}	—	December 18, 2001	Socorro	LINEAR	·	3.4 km	MPC · JPL
415978	2001 YL_{73}	—	December 18, 2001	Socorro	LINEAR	ADE	2.5 km	MPC · JPL
415979	2001 YX_{82}	—	December 18, 2001	Socorro	LINEAR	·	2.7 km	MPC · JPL
415980	2001 YZ_{90}	—	December 17, 2001	Palomar	NEAT	·	830 m	MPC · JPL
415981	2001 YK_{98}	—	December 17, 2001	Socorro	LINEAR	·	1.0 km	MPC · JPL
415982	2001 YN_{99}	—	December 17, 2001	Socorro	LINEAR	·	1.2 km	MPC · JPL
415983	2001 YB_{116}	—	December 17, 2001	Socorro	LINEAR	H	620 m	MPC · JPL
415984	2001 YH_{133}	—	December 22, 2001	Socorro	LINEAR	·	3.5 km	MPC · JPL
415985	2001 YH_{134}	—	December 17, 2001	Socorro	LINEAR	·	1.8 km	MPC · JPL
415986	2002 AT_{5}	—	January 9, 2002	Socorro	LINEAR	AMO +1km · critical	1.1 km	MPC · JPL
415987	2002 AE_{9}	—	January 11, 2002	Socorro	LINEAR	APO	510 m	MPC · JPL
415988	2002 AU_{15}	—	January 12, 2002	Socorro	LINEAR	H	670 m	MPC · JPL
415989	2002 AC_{19}	—	January 6, 2002	Socorro	LINEAR	·	2.1 km	MPC · JPL
415990	2002 AJ_{21}	—	January 9, 2002	Socorro	LINEAR	·	1.9 km	MPC · JPL
415991	2002 AU_{43}	—	January 9, 2002	Socorro	LINEAR	·	1.3 km	MPC · JPL
415992	2002 AT_{49}	—	January 9, 2002	Socorro	LINEAR	GEF	1.5 km	MPC · JPL
415993	2002 AL_{55}	—	December 18, 2001	Socorro	LINEAR	·	2.3 km	MPC · JPL
415994	2002 AR_{62}	—	January 11, 2002	Socorro	LINEAR	·	2.1 km	MPC · JPL
415995	2002 AK_{67}	—	January 15, 2002	Socorro	LINEAR	·	1.8 km	MPC · JPL
415996	2002 AT_{69}	—	January 8, 2002	Socorro	LINEAR	·	1.8 km	MPC · JPL
415997	2002 AJ_{105}	—	January 9, 2002	Socorro	LINEAR	·	1.5 km	MPC · JPL
415998	2002 AT_{108}	—	January 9, 2002	Socorro	LINEAR	·	1.9 km	MPC · JPL
415999	2002 AH_{124}	—	January 9, 2002	Socorro	LINEAR	·	2.0 km	MPC · JPL
416000	2002 AO_{151}	—	January 14, 2002	Socorro	LINEAR	·	2.3 km	MPC · JPL

back to top

== See also ==
- Meanings of minor-planet names: 415001–416000
