= 1993 DA =

Sub-kilometer asteroid

Discovery
- Discovered by: Spacewatch
- Discovery site: Kitt Peak Obs.
- Discovery date: 17 February 1993

Designations
- Minor planet category: Aten · NEO

Orbital characteristics
- Epoch 21 November 2025 (JD 2461000.5)
- Uncertainty parameter 6
- Observation arc: (5 days)
- Aphelion: 1.0230 AU
- Perihelion: 0.8488 AU
- Semi-major axis: 0.9359 AU
- Eccentricity: 0.0931
- Orbital period (sidereal): 0.91 yr (331 days)
- Mean anomaly: 254.71°
- Mean motion: 1° 5^{m} 18.96^{s} / day
- Inclination: 12.395°
- Longitude of ascending node: 329.00°
- Argument of perihelion: 353.96°
- Earth MOID: 0.0332 AU · 12.9 LD

Physical characteristics
- Dimensions: 13–30 m
- Absolute magnitude (H): 26.4

1993 DA is a sub-kilometer asteroid, classified as a near-Earth object of the Aten group. It has only been observed during 5 days in February 1993, and not been detected ever since. The small body measures approximately 20 meters in diameter based on an absolute magnitude of 26.4, and has an Earth minimum orbital intersection distance of 13.8 lunar distances or 0.0355 AU (5,310,000 km).

== Orbit ==
1993 DA was first observed on 17 February 1993, by the Spacewatch survey at Kitt Peak Observatory in Arizona, United States. From 1993 to 1998, it was the asteroid with the lowest known aphelion at 1.023 AU, and was thus the closest thing to an Apohele asteroid known at the time. It currently orbits the Sun at a distance of 0.8–1.0 AU once every 11 months (331 days). Its orbit has an eccentricity of 0.09 and an inclination of 12° with respect to the ecliptic.

== Description ==
When 1998 DK36 was discovered 23 February 1998, it was found to have an aphelion less than 1993 DA, and also less than the Earth's distance to the Sun (0.980 ± 0.05 AU), making it the first detected Apohele asteroid. However, 1998 DK_{36} was lost before the orbit could be confirmed, so 1993 DA retained the title of the asteroid with the lowest known aphelion. When (33342) 1998 WT24 was discovered 25 November 1998, it was found to have a slightly smaller aphelion (1.019 AU) than 1993 DA, so (33342) 1998 WT_{24} took the title. However, (33342) 1998 WT_{24} lost its smallest aphelion title almost immediately when (415713) 1998 XX2 (aphelion of 1.014 AU) was discovered only a few weeks later on 8 December 1998.

The orbit of 1993 DA brings it during the years 1900–2200 as close as 0.034 AU (5,100,000 km; 3,200,000 mi) of the Earth (on 19 February 1993) and as close as 0.13 AU (19,000,000 km; 12,000,000 mi) of Venus (on 15 October 1933, and 30 September 2077). For comparison, the distance to the Moon is about 0.0026 AU (384,400 km). Because the orbit was determined with only 5 days worth of observations, the orbit of 1993 DA has an uncertainty of 6 on a scale of 0 to 9, with 0 being the most certain, and 9 being the most uncertain. This uncertainty is common for small asteroids that are difficult to observe.
