= (415713) 1998 XX2 =

Sub-kilometer asteroid

(415713) 1998 XX_{2}
Discovery
- Discovered by: LINEAR
- Discovery site: Lincoln Lab's ETS
- Discovery date: 8 December 1998

Designations
- Alternative designations: MPO 251988, MPO 315368
- Minor planet category: NEO · Aten · PHA

Orbital characteristics
- Epoch 13 January 2016 (JD 2457400.5)
- Uncertainty parameter 0
- Observation arc: 5832 days (15.97 yr)
- Aphelion: 1.013611188 AU (151.6340754 Gm)
- Perihelion: 0.46896072 AU (70.155525 Gm)
- Semi-major axis: 0.741285953 AU (110.8948001 Gm)
- Eccentricity: 0.3673687
- Orbital period (sidereal): 0.64 yr (233.1 d)
- Average orbital speed: 33.3946406 km/s
- Mean anomaly: 151.54037°
- Mean motion: 1.5442778°/day
- Inclination: 6.9722566°
- Longitude of ascending node: 74.444600°
- Argument of perihelion: 153.00166°
- Earth MOID: 0.0161402 AU (2.41454 Gm)
- T_{Jupiter}: 7.716

Physical characteristics
- Mean diameter: 270–590 m
- Absolute magnitude (H): 19.9

(415713) 1998 XX_{2} is a sub-kilometer asteroid, classified as a near-Earth object and potentially hazardous asteroid of the Aten group. It was discovered 8 December 1998, by the Lincoln Near-Earth Asteroid Research at Lincoln Laboratory's Experimental Test Site, and was found to have frequent approaches to the Earth, Venus, and Mercury.

== Orbit ==
The orbit of 1998 XX_{2} is well-established, and appears on the list of PHA close approaches to Earth, with the next approach at a distance of 0.020237 AU (3,027,400 km; 1,881,100 mi) on 28 November 2028. During the years 1900–2200, close approaches are 0.017 AU (2,500,000 km; 1,600,000 mi) of the Earth (on 30 Nov 1991), as close as 0.035 AU (5,200,000 km; 3,300,000 mi) of Venus (on 28 Jan 1902 and 8 April 2039), and as close as 0.029 AU (4,300,000 km; 2,700,000 mi) of Mercury on 12 occasions. For comparison, the distance to the Moon is about 0.0026 AU (384,400 km).

From 1993 to 1998, 1993 DA was the asteroid with the lowest known aphelion at 1.023 AU, and was thus the closest thing to an Apohele asteroid known at the time. When (33342) 1998 WT24 was discovered 25 November 1998, it was found to have a slightly smaller aphelion (1.019 AU) than 1993 DA, so (33342) 1998 WT_{24} took the title. However, (33342) 1998 WT_{24} lost its smallest aphelion title almost immediately when (415713) 1998 XX_{2} (aphelion of 1.014 AU) was discovered only a few weeks later on 8 December 1998.

The Jupiter Tisserand invariant, used to distinguish different kinds of orbits, is 7.7.
