= List of minor planets: 620001–621000 =

The following is a partial list of minor planets, running from minor-planet number 620001 through 621000, inclusive. The primary data for this and other partial lists is based on JPL's "Small-Body Orbital Elements" and data available from the Minor Planet Center. Critical list information is also provided by the MPC, unless otherwise specified from Lowell Observatory. A detailed description of the table's columns and additional sources are given on the main page including a complete list of every page in this series, and a statistical break-up on the dynamical classification of minor planets.

Also see the summary list of all named bodies in numerical and alphabetical order, and the corresponding naming citations for the number range of this particular list. New namings may only be added to this list after official publication, as the preannouncement of names is condemned by the Working Group for Small Bodies Nomenclature of the International Astronomical Union.

Near-Earth obj.	MBA (inner)	MBA (outer)	Centaur
Mars-crosser	MBA (middle)	Jupiter trojan	Trans-Neptunian obj.
Unclassified

== 620001–620100 ==
Designation			Discovery			Properties		Ref
Permanent	Provisional	Named after	Date	Site	Discoverer(s)	Category	Diam.	Ref
620001	1995 SB_{24}	—	September 19, 1995	Kitt Peak	Spacewatch	·	820 m	MPC · JPL
620002	1995 SR_{42}	—	September 25, 1995	Kitt Peak	Spacewatch	MAS	510 m	MPC · JPL
620003	1995 ST_{76}	—	September 20, 1995	Kitt Peak	Spacewatch	BRG	1.1 km	MPC · JPL
620004	1995 UP_{30}	—	October 20, 1995	Kitt Peak	Spacewatch	·	500 m	MPC · JPL
620005	1996 GZ_{4}	—	April 11, 1996	Kitt Peak	Spacewatch	·	640 m	MPC · JPL
620006	1996 GU_{7}	—	April 12, 1996	Kitt Peak	Spacewatch	·	2.7 km	MPC · JPL
620007	1996 TY_{42}	—	October 4, 1996	Kitt Peak	Spacewatch	·	1.1 km	MPC · JPL
620008	1997 GJ_{2}	—	April 7, 1997	Kitt Peak	Spacewatch	·	1.3 km	MPC · JPL
620009	1997 JO_{19}	—	May 25, 2015	Haleakala	Pan-STARRS 1	·	1.3 km	MPC · JPL
620010	1997 SX_{6}	—	September 23, 1997	Kitt Peak	Spacewatch	LIX	2.9 km	MPC · JPL
620011	1997 TF_{6}	—	October 2, 1997	Caussols	ODAS	·	680 m	MPC · JPL
620012	1998 SE_{8}	—	September 20, 1998	Kitt Peak	Spacewatch	·	2.2 km	MPC · JPL
620013	1998 SR_{178}	—	September 19, 1998	Apache Point	SDSS Collaboration	·	1.5 km	MPC · JPL
620014	1998 SW_{179}	—	October 20, 2011	Mount Lemmon	Mount Lemmon Survey	·	490 m	MPC · JPL
620015	1998 WP_{38}	—	November 21, 1998	Kitt Peak	Spacewatch	·	3.1 km	MPC · JPL
620016	1999 RO_{5}	—	September 3, 1999	Kitt Peak	Spacewatch	·	1.7 km	MPC · JPL
620017	1999 RQ_{37}	—	September 8, 1999	Kitt Peak	Spacewatch	MAR	940 m	MPC · JPL
620018	1999 RX_{65}	—	September 7, 1999	Socorro	LINEAR	·	1.2 km	MPC · JPL
620019	1999 RD_{261}	—	September 5, 1999	Kitt Peak	Spacewatch	·	1.8 km	MPC · JPL
620020	1999 TY_{42}	—	October 3, 1999	Kitt Peak	Spacewatch	·	850 m	MPC · JPL
620021	1999 TE_{51}	—	October 4, 1999	Kitt Peak	Spacewatch	EOS	1.5 km	MPC · JPL
620022	1999 TV_{194}	—	October 12, 1999	Socorro	LINEAR	·	2.3 km	MPC · JPL
620023	1999 TY_{337}	—	November 3, 2008	Kitt Peak	Spacewatch	·	1.1 km	MPC · JPL
620024	1999 TE_{340}	—	August 14, 2013	Haleakala	Pan-STARRS 1	H	390 m	MPC · JPL
620025	1999 TG_{342}	—	October 8, 2015	Haleakala	Pan-STARRS 1	·	2.2 km	MPC · JPL
620026	1999 US_{54}	—	October 19, 1999	Kitt Peak	Spacewatch	·	1.1 km	MPC · JPL
620027	1999 UX_{65}	—	October 29, 1999	Kitt Peak	Spacewatch	·	980 m	MPC · JPL
620028	1999 UZ_{65}	—	April 13, 2008	Kitt Peak	Spacewatch	·	2.6 km	MPC · JPL
620029	1999 VN_{84}	—	November 6, 1999	Kitt Peak	Spacewatch	·	1.4 km	MPC · JPL
620030	1999 VR_{214}	—	November 1, 1999	Kitt Peak	Spacewatch	·	1.9 km	MPC · JPL
620031	1999 VD_{218}	—	November 5, 1999	Kitt Peak	Spacewatch	·	2.3 km	MPC · JPL
620032	1999 VN_{231}	—	September 19, 2003	Kitt Peak	Spacewatch	·	880 m	MPC · JPL
620033	1999 VZ_{231}	—	November 30, 2008	Kitt Peak	Spacewatch	·	1.2 km	MPC · JPL
620034	1999 WH_{24}	—	September 15, 2009	Mount Lemmon	Mount Lemmon Survey	·	2.4 km	MPC · JPL
620035	2000 AK_{256}	—	March 8, 2008	Mount Lemmon	Mount Lemmon Survey	NYS	970 m	MPC · JPL
620036	2000 BV_{50}	—	January 16, 2000	Kitt Peak	Spacewatch	·	2.8 km	MPC · JPL
620037	2000 BF_{53}	—	July 14, 2013	Haleakala	Pan-STARRS 1	·	2.5 km	MPC · JPL
620038	2000 CN_{73}	—	February 7, 2000	Kitt Peak	Spacewatch	·	2.4 km	MPC · JPL
620039	2000 CV_{119}	—	February 27, 2014	Haleakala	Pan-STARRS 1	·	1.4 km	MPC · JPL
620040	2000 CV_{151}	—	January 20, 2009	Kitt Peak	Spacewatch	·	1.5 km	MPC · JPL
620041	2000 CU_{155}	—	January 12, 2018	Haleakala	Pan-STARRS 1	·	1.5 km	MPC · JPL
620042	2000 DQ_{10}	—	February 11, 2000	Kitt Peak	Spacewatch	·	870 m	MPC · JPL
620043	2000 FH_{65}	—	March 27, 2000	Kitt Peak	Spacewatch	NYS	1 km	MPC · JPL
620044	2000 GE_{120}	—	April 5, 2000	Kitt Peak	Spacewatch	H	310 m	MPC · JPL
620045	2000 GO_{130}	—	April 5, 2000	Kitt Peak	Spacewatch	T_{j} (2.93)	3.0 km	MPC · JPL
620046	2000 GG_{188}	—	May 11, 2010	Mount Lemmon	Mount Lemmon Survey	·	720 m	MPC · JPL
620047	2000 GM_{188}	—	January 26, 2011	Mount Lemmon	Mount Lemmon Survey	·	2.3 km	MPC · JPL
620048	2000 OF_{65}	—	July 31, 2000	Cerro Tololo	Deep Ecliptic Survey	·	410 m	MPC · JPL
620049	2000 PX_{21}	—	August 1, 2000	Socorro	LINEAR	·	660 m	MPC · JPL
620050	2000 QU_{259}	—	May 8, 2014	Haleakala	Pan-STARRS 1	KOR	1.1 km	MPC · JPL
620051	2000 SM_{296}	—	September 28, 2000	Socorro	LINEAR	·	1.4 km	MPC · JPL
620052	2000 SW_{381}	—	March 5, 2013	Haleakala	Pan-STARRS 1	·	2.0 km	MPC · JPL
620053	2000 TZ_{78}	—	March 26, 2003	Palomar	NEAT	·	1.1 km	MPC · JPL
620054	2000 WA_{204}	—	November 5, 2005	Catalina	CSS	·	1.6 km	MPC · JPL
620055	2003 BK_{47}	—	January 30, 2003	Kitt Peak	Spacewatch	T_{j} (2.86) · APO +1km · PHA	1 km	MPC · JPL
620056	2004 UR_{1}	—	October 23, 2004	Socorro	LINEAR	APO · PHA	280 m	MPC · JPL
620057	2005 CG_{81}	—	February 10, 2005	Mauna Kea	CFHT Legacy Survey	other TNO	194 km	MPC · JPL
620058	2006 GV_{2}	—	April 7, 2006	Mount Lemmon	Mount Lemmon Survey	APO	410 m	MPC · JPL
620059	2006 QS_{23}	—	August 22, 2006	Palomar	NEAT	APO	340 m	MPC · JPL
620060	2006 QU_{90}	—	August 28, 2006	Catalina	CSS	·	1.1 km	MPC · JPL
620061	2006 UB_{64}	—	October 22, 2006	Siding Spring	SSS	APO	260 m	MPC · JPL
620062	2008 KD_{6}	—	May 29, 2008	Mount Lemmon	Mount Lemmon Survey	APO	410 m	MPC · JPL
620063	2009 DH_{39}	—	February 25, 2009	Siding Spring	SSS	APO · PHA	680 m	MPC · JPL
620064	2009 QD_{34}	—	August 26, 2009	Catalina	CSS	AMO +1km	810 m	MPC · JPL
620065	2010 JF_{210}	—	May 9, 2010	Haleakala	Pan-STARRS 1	cubewano (hot)	240 km	MPC · JPL
620066	2010 SC_{41}	—	September 17, 2010	Mount Lemmon	Mount Lemmon Survey	APO · PHA	380 m	MPC · JPL
620067	2010 UE_{7}	—	October 27, 2010	Siding Spring	SSS	APO	480 m	MPC · JPL
620068	2010 VE	—	November 1, 2010	Catalina	CSS	APO	390 m	MPC · JPL
620069	2011 FY_{2}	—	March 26, 2011	Catalina	CSS	AMO +1km	910 m	MPC · JPL
620070	2011 UA	—	October 16, 2011	Catalina	CSS	AMO · fast	680 m	MPC · JPL
620071	2011 WN_{15}	—	November 22, 2011	Catalina	CSS	APO · PHA	420 m	MPC · JPL
620072	2012 BD_{124}	—	January 30, 2012	Mount Lemmon	Mount Lemmon Survey	APO	520 m	MPC · JPL
620073	2012 HO_{2}	—	April 19, 2012	Mount Lemmon	Mount Lemmon Survey	APO	290 m	MPC · JPL
620074	2013 AT_{183}	—	January 10, 2013	Haleakala	Pan-STARRS 1	SDO	392 km	MPC · JPL
620075	2013 CD_{223}	—	January 30, 2011	Haleakala	Pan-STARRS 1	plutino	341 km	MPC · JPL
620076	2013 UR_{3}	—	October 23, 2013	Catalina	CSS	T_{j} (2.77) · AMO +1km	1.4 km	MPC · JPL
620077	2013 WR_{44}	—	November 26, 2013	Haleakala	Pan-STARRS 1	APO	280 m	MPC · JPL
620078	2014 HO_{4}	—	April 22, 2014	Catalina	CSS	APO	490 m	MPC · JPL
620079	2014 HO_{129}	—	April 25, 2014	Mount Lemmon	Mount Lemmon Survey	APO	500 m	MPC · JPL
620080	2014 HM_{178}	—	April 30, 2014	Cerro Tololo	Linder, T., R. Holmes	APO	740 m	MPC · JPL
620081	2014 MX_{26}	—	May 6, 2014	Haleakala	Pan-STARRS 1	T_{j} (2.95)	2.3 km	MPC · JPL
620082	2014 QL_{433}	—	August 31, 2014	Haleakala	Pan-STARRS 1	APO · PHA · moon	380 m	MPC · JPL
620083	2014 SZ_{303}	—	September 19, 2014	Haleakala	Pan-STARRS 1	APO	780 m	MPC · JPL
620084	2014 WD_{201}	—	November 21, 2014	Haleakala	Pan-STARRS 1	AMO · PHA	490 m	MPC · JPL
620085	2014 WG_{365}	—	November 25, 2014	Haleakala	Pan-STARRS 1	APO · PHA	340 m	MPC · JPL
620086	2015 BB_{519}	—	January 16, 2015	Haleakala	Pan-STARRS 1	SDO	170 km	MPC · JPL
620087	2015 DE_{249}	—	February 17, 2015	Cerro Tololo-DECam	DECam	SDO	120 km	MPC · JPL
620088	2015 DJ_{249}	—	February 17, 2015	Cerro Tololo-DECam	DECam	other TNO	168 km	MPC · JPL
620089	2015 FF_{120}	—	March 25, 2015	Haleakala	Pan-STARRS 1	APO	460 m	MPC · JPL
620090	2015 FP_{332}	—	March 27, 2015	Haleakala	Pan-STARRS 1	T_{j} (2.7) · APO +1km	1.2 km	MPC · JPL
620091	2015 FD_{341}	—	March 27, 2015	WISE	WISE	ATE +1km	1.2 km	MPC · JPL
620092	2015 HB_{10}	—	January 23, 2015	Haleakala	Pan-STARRS 1	APO · PHA	760 m	MPC · JPL
620093	2015 YP_{10}	—	December 31, 2015	Space Surveillance	Space Surveillance Telescope	AMO	320 m	MPC · JPL
620094	2016 AJ_{193}	—	January 15, 2016	Haleakala	Pan-STARRS 1	T_{j} (2.44) · APO +1km · PHA	1.4 km	MPC · JPL
620095	2016 CB_{194}	—	January 31, 2004	Apache Point	SDSS Collaboration	APO +1km · PHA	1.0 km	MPC · JPL
620096 Curupira	2016 HL	Curupira	April 19, 2016	SONEAR	SONEAR	APO · PHA	380 m	MPC · JPL
620097	2016 HD_{19}	—	April 29, 2016	Catalina	CSS	APO	590 m	MPC · JPL
620098	2016 JG_{18}	—	May 1, 2016	Haleakala	Pan-STARRS 1	APO	660 m	MPC · JPL
620099	2016 OP_{5}	—	July 18, 2016	Haleakala	Pan-STARRS 1	APO · PHA	230 m	MPC · JPL
620100	2016 WJ_{1}	—	November 6, 2016	Kitt Peak	Spacewatch	APO · PHA	190 m	MPC · JPL

== 620101–620200 ==
back to top

Designation			Discovery			Properties		Ref
Permanent	Provisional	Named after	Date	Site	Discoverer(s)	Category	Diam.	Ref
620101	2017 MW_{7}	—	June 29, 2017	Mount Lemmon	Mount Lemmon Survey	AMO	220 m	MPC · JPL
620102	2017 QM_{18}	—	August 25, 2017	Haleakala	Pan-STARRS 1	AMO	670 m	MPC · JPL
620103	2018 LC_{3}	—	June 7, 2018	Mount Lemmon	Mount Lemmon Survey	APO · PHA	620 m	MPC · JPL
620104	2018 LG_{5}	—	June 12, 2018	Haleakala	Pan-STARRS 1	APO	720 m	MPC · JPL
620105	2018 YS	—	December 16, 2018	Palomar	Zwicky Transient Facility	APO	450 m	MPC · JPL
620106	2020 HP_{8}	—	March 17, 2020	Cerro Tololo-DECam	DECam	APO	320 m	MPC · JPL
620107	2020 XK_{7}	—	December 10, 2020	Haleakala	Pan-STARRS 1	APO · PHA	440 m	MPC · JPL
620108	2021 AX_{7}	—	January 15, 2021	Mount Lemmon	Mount Lemmon Survey	AMO	230 m	MPC · JPL
620109	1995 OY_{10}	—	July 27, 1995	Kitt Peak	Spacewatch	·	590 m	MPC · JPL
620110	1995 OT_{14}	—	July 4, 1995	Kitt Peak	Spacewatch	·	1.1 km	MPC · JPL
620111	1995 SF_{51}	—	September 26, 1995	Kitt Peak	Spacewatch	·	990 m	MPC · JPL
620112	1995 UB_{41}	—	October 23, 1995	Kitt Peak	Spacewatch	·	860 m	MPC · JPL
620113	1995 UM_{67}	—	October 18, 1995	Kitt Peak	Spacewatch	·	700 m	MPC · JPL
620114	1995 UP_{70}	—	October 19, 1995	Kitt Peak	Spacewatch	THM	2.3 km	MPC · JPL
620115	1995 UJ_{84}	—	October 17, 1995	Kitt Peak	Spacewatch	(5)	1.2 km	MPC · JPL
620116	1996 SK_{3}	—	September 20, 1996	Kitt Peak	Spacewatch	·	500 m	MPC · JPL
620117	1996 VD_{19}	—	November 7, 1996	Kitt Peak	Spacewatch	LIX	2.4 km	MPC · JPL
620118	1996 VG_{29}	—	November 13, 1996	Kitt Peak	Spacewatch	·	2.2 km	MPC · JPL
620119	1997 PG_{4}	—	August 12, 1997	Kitt Peak	Spacewatch	·	1.1 km	MPC · JPL
620120	1997 SY_{12}	—	September 28, 1997	Kitt Peak	Spacewatch	·	1.4 km	MPC · JPL
620121	1997 WP_{13}	—	November 20, 1997	Kitt Peak	Spacewatch	·	1.7 km	MPC · JPL
620122	1997 WS_{15}	—	November 23, 1997	Kitt Peak	Spacewatch	·	950 m	MPC · JPL
620123	1998 RX_{21}	—	September 15, 1998	Kitt Peak	Spacewatch	MAS	490 m	MPC · JPL
620124	1998 WZ_{36}	—	November 21, 1998	Kitt Peak	Spacewatch	·	940 m	MPC · JPL
620125	1999 TG_{64}	—	September 6, 1999	Kitt Peak	Spacewatch	(5)	940 m	MPC · JPL
620126	1999 TL_{80}	—	October 4, 1999	Kitt Peak	Spacewatch	·	990 m	MPC · JPL
620127	1999 TU_{263}	—	October 15, 1999	Kitt Peak	Spacewatch	·	760 m	MPC · JPL
620128	1999 TE_{301}	—	October 3, 1999	Kitt Peak	Spacewatch	·	870 m	MPC · JPL
620129	1999 TG_{314}	—	September 28, 1992	Kitt Peak	Spacewatch	·	780 m	MPC · JPL
620130	1999 TG_{340}	—	September 26, 2006	Kitt Peak	Spacewatch	·	590 m	MPC · JPL
620131	1999 TP_{342}	—	October 10, 1999	Kitt Peak	Spacewatch	·	660 m	MPC · JPL
620132	1999 VF_{232}	—	October 21, 2006	Palomar	NEAT	·	890 m	MPC · JPL
620133	1999 VR_{232}	—	September 17, 2006	Catalina	CSS	·	660 m	MPC · JPL
620134	1999 WO_{25}	—	November 29, 1999	Kitt Peak	Spacewatch	·	1.1 km	MPC · JPL
620135	1999 WM_{28}	—	September 30, 2006	Kitt Peak	Spacewatch	·	750 m	MPC · JPL
620136	1999 YC_{17}	—	December 31, 1999	Kitt Peak	Spacewatch	·	1.9 km	MPC · JPL
620137	2000 AZ_{220}	—	January 8, 2000	Kitt Peak	Spacewatch	HNS	1.2 km	MPC · JPL
620138	2000 AY_{259}	—	April 19, 2015	Kitt Peak	Spacewatch	·	1.4 km	MPC · JPL
620139	2000 CW_{153}	—	October 23, 2003	Apache Point	SDSS Collaboration	·	1.8 km	MPC · JPL
620140	2000 EX_{99}	—	March 11, 2000	Socorro	LINEAR	·	1.8 km	MPC · JPL
620141	2000 EU_{211}	—	January 27, 2017	Mount Lemmon	Mount Lemmon Survey	HNS	1.0 km	MPC · JPL
620142	2000 JR_{96}	—	August 8, 2012	Haleakala	Pan-STARRS 1	PHO	680 m	MPC · JPL
620143	2000 OS_{57}	—	August 1, 2000	Socorro	LINEAR	·	660 m	MPC · JPL
620144	2000 OD_{70}	—	October 9, 2007	Mount Lemmon	Mount Lemmon Survey	·	660 m	MPC · JPL
620145	2000 PA_{33}	—	September 1, 2005	Kitt Peak	Spacewatch	·	1.5 km	MPC · JPL
620146	2000 QN_{129}	—	August 31, 2000	Socorro	LINEAR	·	590 m	MPC · JPL
620147	2000 RQ_{76}	—	August 3, 2000	Kitt Peak	Spacewatch	·	1.7 km	MPC · JPL
620148	2000 RT_{110}	—	September 17, 2010	Kitt Peak	Spacewatch	KOR	1.1 km	MPC · JPL
620149	2000 SQ_{196}	—	September 24, 2000	Socorro	LINEAR	·	580 m	MPC · JPL
620150	2000 SB_{333}	—	September 26, 2000	Socorro	LINEAR	·	700 m	MPC · JPL
620151	2000 SM_{342}	—	September 24, 2000	Socorro	LINEAR	·	580 m	MPC · JPL
620152	2000 SF_{382}	—	October 26, 2008	Mount Lemmon	Mount Lemmon Survey	·	1.3 km	MPC · JPL
620153	2000 SM_{383}	—	April 16, 2013	Haleakala	Pan-STARRS 1	·	1.9 km	MPC · JPL
620154	2000 SX_{385}	—	March 18, 2017	Kitt Peak	Spacewatch	·	2.0 km	MPC · JPL
620155	2000 TE_{77}	—	October 16, 2007	Kitt Peak	Spacewatch	V	450 m	MPC · JPL
620156	2000 TU_{80}	—	September 20, 2012	Mount Lemmon	Mount Lemmon Survey	L5	7.8 km	MPC · JPL
620157	2000 UP_{115}	—	May 23, 2006	Mount Lemmon	Mount Lemmon Survey	·	510 m	MPC · JPL
620158	2000 WE_{199}	—	March 2, 2012	Mount Lemmon	Mount Lemmon Survey	·	690 m	MPC · JPL
620159	2000 YJ_{23}	—	December 28, 2000	Kitt Peak	Spacewatch	·	990 m	MPC · JPL
620160	2000 YH_{145}	—	September 16, 2010	Mount Lemmon	Mount Lemmon Survey	·	1.7 km	MPC · JPL
620161	2001 AU_{49}	—	January 14, 2001	Kitt Peak	Spacewatch	·	4.6 km	MPC · JPL
620162	2001 DA_{82}	—	February 22, 2001	Kitt Peak	Spacewatch	·	910 m	MPC · JPL
620163	2001 DD_{85}	—	February 23, 2001	Cerro Tololo	Deep Lens Survey	·	1.7 km	MPC · JPL
620164	2001 DR_{85}	—	February 24, 2001	Cerro Tololo	Deep Lens Survey	·	700 m	MPC · JPL
620165	2001 DM_{116}	—	October 28, 2008	Kitt Peak	Spacewatch	EUN	890 m	MPC · JPL
620166	2001 FF_{206}	—	May 26, 2006	Kitt Peak	Spacewatch	(1547)	1.0 km	MPC · JPL
620167	2001 FX_{210}	—	November 7, 2007	Mount Lemmon	Mount Lemmon Survey	·	970 m	MPC · JPL
620168	2001 FH_{215}	—	September 29, 2003	Kitt Peak	Spacewatch	·	1.7 km	MPC · JPL
620169	2001 FA_{220}	—	March 21, 2001	Kitt Peak	SKADS	·	640 m	MPC · JPL
620170	2001 FZ_{228}	—	August 1, 2009	Kitt Peak	Spacewatch	·	650 m	MPC · JPL
620171	2001 FP_{236}	—	March 22, 2001	Kitt Peak	SKADS	·	1.3 km	MPC · JPL
620172	2001 FC_{237}	—	June 24, 2009	Mount Lemmon	Mount Lemmon Survey	·	760 m	MPC · JPL
620173	2001 FC_{244}	—	February 1, 2008	Kitt Peak	Spacewatch	·	950 m	MPC · JPL
620174	2001 FX_{248}	—	March 26, 2001	Kitt Peak	Deep Ecliptic Survey	EUN	820 m	MPC · JPL
620175	2001 HD_{69}	—	April 5, 2014	Haleakala	Pan-STARRS 1	BAR	1.1 km	MPC · JPL
620176	2001 HT_{69}	—	February 26, 2014	Haleakala	Pan-STARRS 1	·	1.2 km	MPC · JPL
620177	2001 KE_{80}	—	September 27, 2006	Mount Lemmon	Mount Lemmon Survey	·	1.6 km	MPC · JPL
620178	2001 KR_{80}	—	October 8, 2008	Catalina	CSS	·	2.0 km	MPC · JPL
620179	2001 KZ_{84}	—	September 24, 2008	Kitt Peak	Spacewatch	·	1.9 km	MPC · JPL
620180	2001 KZ_{85}	—	March 11, 2008	Kitt Peak	Spacewatch	V	480 m	MPC · JPL
620181	2001 KH_{88}	—	September 24, 2008	Mount Lemmon	Mount Lemmon Survey	·	2.7 km	MPC · JPL
620182	2001 LV_{16}	—	June 15, 2001	Socorro	LINEAR	·	1.2 km	MPC · JPL
620183	2001 MV_{31}	—	April 10, 2014	Haleakala	Pan-STARRS 1	·	1.8 km	MPC · JPL
620184	2001 MA_{32}	—	October 1, 2014	Haleakala	Pan-STARRS 1	·	3.2 km	MPC · JPL
620185	2001 OD_{115}	—	November 1, 2006	Mount Lemmon	Mount Lemmon Survey	·	1.2 km	MPC · JPL
620186	2001 PM_{34}	—	August 10, 2001	Palomar	NEAT	·	1.2 km	MPC · JPL
620187	2001 PT_{60}	—	July 21, 2001	Haleakala	NEAT	·	2.1 km	MPC · JPL
620188	2001 PR_{67}	—	October 31, 2005	Anderson Mesa	LONEOS	PHO	770 m	MPC · JPL
620189	2001 QR_{108}	—	August 16, 2001	Palomar	NEAT	·	450 m	MPC · JPL
620190	2001 QY_{140}	—	August 11, 2001	Haleakala	NEAT	·	550 m	MPC · JPL
620191	2001 QC_{145}	—	August 24, 2001	Kitt Peak	Spacewatch	·	1.9 km	MPC · JPL
620192	2001 QQ_{173}	—	August 25, 2001	Socorro	LINEAR	·	440 m	MPC · JPL
620193	2001 QO_{209}	—	August 23, 2001	Anderson Mesa	LONEOS	·	1.3 km	MPC · JPL
620194	2001 QM_{307}	—	August 19, 2001	Cerro Tololo	Deep Ecliptic Survey	·	1.4 km	MPC · JPL
620195	2001 RK_{2}	—	August 23, 2001	Haleakala	NEAT	·	3.9 km	MPC · JPL
620196	2001 RO_{46}	—	July 27, 2001	Palomar	NEAT	·	1.1 km	MPC · JPL
620197	2001 RQ_{95}	—	September 12, 2001	Socorro	LINEAR	NYS	840 m	MPC · JPL
620198	2001 RX_{96}	—	May 23, 2001	Cerro Tololo	Deep Ecliptic Survey	·	660 m	MPC · JPL
620199	2001 SF_{220}	—	September 11, 2001	Anderson Mesa	LONEOS	·	1.4 km	MPC · JPL
620200	2001 ST_{236}	—	September 17, 2001	Kitt Peak	Spacewatch	MAS	750 m	MPC · JPL

== 620201–620300 ==
back to top

Designation			Discovery			Properties		Ref
Permanent	Provisional	Named after	Date	Site	Discoverer(s)	Category	Diam.	Ref
620201	2001 SQ_{269}	—	September 19, 2001	Kitt Peak	Spacewatch	·	1.4 km	MPC · JPL
620202	2001 SE_{302}	—	September 12, 2001	Kitt Peak	Spacewatch	·	1.4 km	MPC · JPL
620203	2001 SC_{304}	—	September 20, 2001	Socorro	LINEAR	·	490 m	MPC · JPL
620204	2001 SD_{326}	—	September 17, 2001	Kitt Peak	Spacewatch	·	1.5 km	MPC · JPL
620205	2001 SZ_{346}	—	September 25, 2001	Socorro	LINEAR	·	2.1 km	MPC · JPL
620206	2001 SZ_{356}	—	October 16, 2001	Palomar	NEAT	·	1.2 km	MPC · JPL
620207	2001 SB_{358}	—	October 15, 2001	Palomar	NEAT	T_{j} (2.97)	2.1 km	MPC · JPL
620208	2001 SR_{358}	—	February 6, 2014	Mount Lemmon	Mount Lemmon Survey	·	980 m	MPC · JPL
620209	2001 SF_{359}	—	October 13, 2005	Kitt Peak	Spacewatch	NYS	830 m	MPC · JPL
620210	2001 SC_{364}	—	September 20, 2001	Kitt Peak	Spacewatch	·	2.5 km	MPC · JPL
620211	2001 SR_{364}	—	September 20, 2001	Kitt Peak	Spacewatch	MAS	540 m	MPC · JPL
620212	2001 TJ_{59}	—	September 24, 2001	Socorro	LINEAR	·	990 m	MPC · JPL
620213	2001 TJ_{166}	—	October 13, 2001	Palomar	NEAT	·	3.0 km	MPC · JPL
620214	2001 TH_{242}	—	August 21, 2001	Cerro Tololo	Deep Ecliptic Survey	·	810 m	MPC · JPL
620215	2001 TC_{259}	—	November 10, 2005	Kitt Peak	Spacewatch	NYS	1.1 km	MPC · JPL
620216	2001 TN_{264}	—	March 28, 2014	Mount Lemmon	Mount Lemmon Survey	H	420 m	MPC · JPL
620217	2001 TF_{266}	—	September 17, 2010	Mount Lemmon	Mount Lemmon Survey	·	1.4 km	MPC · JPL
620218	2001 UM	—	October 16, 2001	Cima Ekar	ADAS	·	1.4 km	MPC · JPL
620219	2001 UF_{88}	—	October 18, 2001	Palomar	NEAT	·	1.6 km	MPC · JPL
620220	2001 UU_{129}	—	October 20, 2001	Socorro	LINEAR	·	870 m	MPC · JPL
620221	2001 UU_{173}	—	October 18, 2001	Palomar	NEAT	·	3.1 km	MPC · JPL
620222	2001 UN_{176}	—	October 25, 2001	Kitt Peak	Spacewatch	·	450 m	MPC · JPL
620223	2001 UX_{208}	—	October 20, 2001	Socorro	LINEAR	·	1.4 km	MPC · JPL
620224	2001 UE_{210}	—	October 18, 2001	Palomar	NEAT	NYS	990 m	MPC · JPL
620225	2001 UD_{231}	—	October 15, 2001	Kitt Peak	Spacewatch	·	750 m	MPC · JPL
620226	2001 UR_{232}	—	October 18, 2001	Palomar	NEAT	L5	9.1 km	MPC · JPL
620227	2001 UT_{237}	—	September 12, 2007	Mount Lemmon	Mount Lemmon Survey	·	2.3 km	MPC · JPL
620228	2001 UX_{239}	—	October 13, 2007	Kitt Peak	Spacewatch	HYG	2.3 km	MPC · JPL
620229	2001 VN_{135}	—	November 12, 2001	Apache Point	SDSS Collaboration	·	520 m	MPC · JPL
620230	2001 VO_{135}	—	August 27, 2016	Haleakala	Pan-STARRS 1	·	860 m	MPC · JPL
620231	2001 XD_{31}	—	December 10, 2001	Socorro	LINEAR	·	2.2 km	MPC · JPL
620232	2001 XR_{229}	—	November 11, 2001	Socorro	LINEAR	·	1.6 km	MPC · JPL
620233	2001 YX_{44}	—	December 18, 2001	Socorro	LINEAR	EUP	3.6 km	MPC · JPL
620234	2002 AB_{210}	—	August 28, 2014	Haleakala	Pan-STARRS 1	·	1.8 km	MPC · JPL
620235	2002 AP_{211}	—	December 23, 2012	Haleakala	Pan-STARRS 1	NYS	990 m	MPC · JPL
620236	2002 CM_{319}	—	May 25, 2011	Mount Lemmon	Mount Lemmon Survey	EUN	880 m	MPC · JPL
620237	2002 CG_{321}	—	April 18, 2015	Haleakala	Pan-STARRS 1	·	1.1 km	MPC · JPL
620238	2002 CB_{324}	—	February 6, 2002	Palomar	NEAT	·	610 m	MPC · JPL
620239	2002 CO_{326}	—	March 4, 2016	Haleakala	Pan-STARRS 1	V	440 m	MPC · JPL
620240	2002 EM_{165}	—	January 25, 2012	Haleakala	Pan-STARRS 1	PHO	920 m	MPC · JPL
620241	2002 EQ_{167}	—	April 12, 2012	Haleakala	Pan-STARRS 1	·	1.7 km	MPC · JPL
620242	2002 GL_{162}	—	April 14, 2002	Palomar	NEAT	·	1.2 km	MPC · JPL
620243	2002 GA_{193}	—	October 29, 2010	Kitt Peak	Spacewatch	·	660 m	MPC · JPL
620244	2002 GK_{196}	—	August 16, 2006	Palomar	NEAT	·	600 m	MPC · JPL
620245	2002 GZ_{196}	—	August 7, 2013	Kitt Peak	Spacewatch	V	380 m	MPC · JPL
620246	2002 GP_{197}	—	October 2, 2008	Kitt Peak	Spacewatch	MAR	750 m	MPC · JPL
620247	2002 JS_{152}	—	July 15, 2013	Haleakala	Pan-STARRS 1	·	630 m	MPC · JPL
620248	2002 LX_{65}	—	March 31, 2009	Kitt Peak	Spacewatch	·	650 m	MPC · JPL
620249	2002 LC_{66}	—	October 12, 2007	Mount Lemmon	Mount Lemmon Survey	·	750 m	MPC · JPL
620250	2002 LN_{66}	—	August 9, 2013	Kitt Peak	Spacewatch	·	630 m	MPC · JPL
620251	2002 NM_{30}	—	July 6, 2002	Kitt Peak	Spacewatch	·	1.4 km	MPC · JPL
620252	2002 NQ_{65}	—	July 13, 2002	Palomar	NEAT	·	960 m	MPC · JPL
620253	2002 NC_{66}	—	August 6, 2002	Palomar	NEAT	·	2.5 km	MPC · JPL
620254	2002 NL_{72}	—	July 15, 2002	Palomar	NEAT	·	2.3 km	MPC · JPL
620255	2002 NF_{80}	—	August 26, 2011	Piszkéstető	K. Sárneczky	JUN	850 m	MPC · JPL
620256	2002 NH_{82}	—	April 27, 2012	Haleakala	Pan-STARRS 1	·	1.4 km	MPC · JPL
620257	2002 NL_{83}	—	March 19, 2013	Haleakala	Pan-STARRS 1	KON	2.4 km	MPC · JPL
620258	2002 OJ_{20}	—	July 26, 2002	Palomar	NEAT	·	1.5 km	MPC · JPL
620259	2002 OS_{22}	—	July 31, 2002	Socorro	LINEAR	BAR	1.4 km	MPC · JPL
620260	2002 OT_{26}	—	June 21, 2002	La Palma	S. Collander-Brown, A. Fitzsimmons	·	1.3 km	MPC · JPL
620261	2002 OS_{36}	—	October 4, 2006	Mount Lemmon	Mount Lemmon Survey	ERI	1.0 km	MPC · JPL
620262	2002 OJ_{37}	—	August 6, 2002	Palomar	NEAT	·	1.1 km	MPC · JPL
620263	2002 PS_{8}	—	August 5, 2002	Palomar	NEAT	·	1.1 km	MPC · JPL
620264	2002 PJ_{16}	—	August 6, 2002	Palomar	NEAT	·	1.2 km	MPC · JPL
620265	2002 PP_{28}	—	August 6, 2002	Palomar	NEAT	·	880 m	MPC · JPL
620266	2002 PJ_{52}	—	August 8, 2002	Palomar	NEAT	·	680 m	MPC · JPL
620267	2002 PJ_{66}	—	August 6, 2002	Palomar	NEAT	·	580 m	MPC · JPL
620268	2002 PU_{130}	—	July 23, 2002	Palomar	NEAT	·	2.1 km	MPC · JPL
620269	2002 PN_{131}	—	August 14, 2002	Palomar	NEAT	·	2.0 km	MPC · JPL
620270	2002 PD_{141}	—	August 14, 2002	Siding Spring	K. S. Russell, R. H. McNaught	·	1.7 km	MPC · JPL
620271	2002 PM_{166}	—	August 11, 2002	Palomar	NEAT	·	1.1 km	MPC · JPL
620272	2002 PE_{187}	—	August 18, 2002	Palomar	NEAT	·	970 m	MPC · JPL
620273	2002 PG_{188}	—	August 27, 2002	Palomar	NEAT	·	950 m	MPC · JPL
620274	2002 PM_{188}	—	August 8, 2002	Palomar	NEAT	·	1.5 km	MPC · JPL
620275	2002 PC_{194}	—	August 15, 2002	Palomar	NEAT	·	870 m	MPC · JPL
620276	2002 PN_{198}	—	October 23, 2006	Kitt Peak	Spacewatch	·	880 m	MPC · JPL
620277	2002 PG_{200}	—	October 26, 2011	Haleakala	Pan-STARRS 1	·	920 m	MPC · JPL
620278	2002 PO_{200}	—	August 11, 2002	Palomar	NEAT	·	1.1 km	MPC · JPL
620279	2002 PF_{202}	—	February 16, 2010	Mount Lemmon	Mount Lemmon Survey	·	2.2 km	MPC · JPL
620280	2002 PN_{202}	—	August 14, 2002	Palomar	NEAT	·	1.4 km	MPC · JPL
620281	2002 PW_{204}	—	February 27, 2012	Haleakala	Pan-STARRS 1	·	760 m	MPC · JPL
620282	2002 QU_{11}	—	August 6, 2002	Palomar	NEAT	(5)	1.2 km	MPC · JPL
620283	2002 QZ_{22}	—	July 29, 2002	Palomar	NEAT	·	900 m	MPC · JPL
620284	2002 QF_{53}	—	August 18, 2002	Palomar	NEAT	·	600 m	MPC · JPL
620285	2002 QP_{66}	—	August 18, 2002	Palomar	NEAT	·	1.1 km	MPC · JPL
620286	2002 QH_{68}	—	August 29, 2002	Palomar	NEAT	·	860 m	MPC · JPL
620287	2002 QG_{73}	—	August 28, 2002	Palomar	NEAT	·	1.3 km	MPC · JPL
620288	2002 QM_{74}	—	August 29, 2002	Palomar	NEAT	·	680 m	MPC · JPL
620289	2002 QL_{82}	—	August 17, 2002	Palomar	NEAT	·	650 m	MPC · JPL
620290	2002 QH_{85}	—	August 17, 2002	Palomar	NEAT	·	820 m	MPC · JPL
620291	2002 QG_{90}	—	August 30, 2002	Palomar	NEAT	V	530 m	MPC · JPL
620292	2002 QQ_{90}	—	August 30, 2002	Palomar	NEAT	·	1.5 km	MPC · JPL
620293	2002 QE_{91}	—	August 30, 2002	Palomar	NEAT	·	540 m	MPC · JPL
620294	2002 QP_{92}	—	August 18, 2002	Palomar	NEAT	·	790 m	MPC · JPL
620295	2002 QX_{94}	—	August 18, 2002	Palomar	NEAT	MIS	1.9 km	MPC · JPL
620296	2002 QZ_{103}	—	August 30, 2002	Palomar	NEAT	·	880 m	MPC · JPL
620297	2002 QY_{107}	—	August 27, 2002	Palomar	NEAT	THB	2.3 km	MPC · JPL
620298	2002 QM_{113}	—	August 27, 2002	Palomar	NEAT	·	2.3 km	MPC · JPL
620299	2002 QK_{117}	—	August 16, 2002	Palomar	NEAT	·	700 m	MPC · JPL
620300	2002 QB_{125}	—	August 18, 2002	Palomar	NEAT	NYS	680 m	MPC · JPL

== 620301–620400 ==
back to top

Designation			Discovery			Properties		Ref
Permanent	Provisional	Named after	Date	Site	Discoverer(s)	Category	Diam.	Ref
620301	2002 QN_{138}	—	November 11, 2006	Mount Lemmon	Mount Lemmon Survey	·	730 m	MPC · JPL
620302	2002 QO_{140}	—	October 9, 2002	Kitt Peak	Spacewatch	·	790 m	MPC · JPL
620303	2002 QS_{142}	—	August 27, 2002	Palomar	NEAT	TIR	2.1 km	MPC · JPL
620304	2002 QV_{143}	—	August 27, 2002	Palomar	NEAT	·	1.8 km	MPC · JPL
620305	2002 QW_{144}	—	August 6, 2002	Palomar	NEAT	·	600 m	MPC · JPL
620306	2002 QE_{145}	—	August 20, 2002	Palomar	NEAT	LIX	2.9 km	MPC · JPL
620307 Casanovas	2002 QL_{149}	Casanovas	February 22, 2012	Mount Graham	K. Černis, R. P. Boyle	·	700 m	MPC · JPL
620308	2002 QA_{150}	—	August 16, 2002	Palomar	NEAT	·	1.1 km	MPC · JPL
620309	2002 QZ_{151}	—	August 28, 2002	Palomar	NEAT	·	1.2 km	MPC · JPL
620310	2002 QA_{152}	—	September 18, 2011	Kitt Peak	Spacewatch	·	1.3 km	MPC · JPL
620311	2002 QG_{153}	—	July 20, 2002	Palomar	NEAT	·	3.2 km	MPC · JPL
620312	2002 QZ_{153}	—	August 16, 2002	Palomar	NEAT	·	700 m	MPC · JPL
620313	2002 QN_{154}	—	March 6, 2013	Haleakala	Pan-STARRS 1	·	940 m	MPC · JPL
620314	2002 QH_{155}	—	August 28, 2002	Palomar	NEAT	·	1.9 km	MPC · JPL
620315	2002 QG_{156}	—	August 26, 2002	Palomar	NEAT	·	690 m	MPC · JPL
620316	2002 QA_{157}	—	October 1, 2013	Mount Lemmon	Mount Lemmon Survey	·	620 m	MPC · JPL
620317	2002 QK_{157}	—	August 31, 2002	Kitt Peak	Spacewatch	·	1.0 km	MPC · JPL
620318	2002 QF_{158}	—	August 28, 2002	Palomar	NEAT	·	2.4 km	MPC · JPL
620319	2002 QW_{158}	—	October 8, 2008	Mount Lemmon	Mount Lemmon Survey	·	2.1 km	MPC · JPL
620320	2002 QC_{159}	—	September 8, 2002	Campo Imperatore	CINEOS	·	920 m	MPC · JPL
620321	2002 QJ_{160}	—	February 14, 2012	Haleakala	Pan-STARRS 1	·	950 m	MPC · JPL
620322	2002 RO_{2}	—	September 5, 2002	Socorro	LINEAR	·	1.9 km	MPC · JPL
620323	2002 RW_{90}	—	September 5, 2002	Socorro	LINEAR	·	760 m	MPC · JPL
620324	2002 RY_{123}	—	August 19, 2002	Palomar	NEAT	·	910 m	MPC · JPL
620325	2002 RC_{124}	—	September 9, 2002	Palomar	NEAT	JUN	890 m	MPC · JPL
620326	2002 RL_{147}	—	September 7, 2002	Socorro	LINEAR	·	1.5 km	MPC · JPL
620327	2002 RM_{163}	—	September 12, 2002	Palomar	NEAT	MAS	630 m	MPC · JPL
620328	2002 RS_{166}	—	September 7, 2002	Socorro	LINEAR	·	790 m	MPC · JPL
620329	2002 RX_{168}	—	September 13, 2002	Palomar	NEAT	·	1.6 km	MPC · JPL
620330	2002 RG_{186}	—	September 12, 2002	Palomar	NEAT	·	880 m	MPC · JPL
620331	2002 RG_{188}	—	September 7, 2002	Socorro	LINEAR	·	1.5 km	MPC · JPL
620332	2002 RQ_{255}	—	September 3, 2002	Palomar	NEAT	·	1.5 km	MPC · JPL
620333	2002 RR_{264}	—	September 6, 2002	Socorro	LINEAR	·	1.3 km	MPC · JPL
620334	2002 RM_{266}	—	August 6, 2002	Palomar	NEAT	·	770 m	MPC · JPL
620335	2002 RJ_{270}	—	September 4, 2002	Palomar	NEAT	·	2.3 km	MPC · JPL
620336	2002 RT_{271}	—	August 27, 2002	Palomar	NEAT	·	910 m	MPC · JPL
620337	2002 RV_{273}	—	September 4, 2002	Palomar	NEAT	·	1.6 km	MPC · JPL
620338	2002 RE_{277}	—	November 8, 2002	Apache Point	SDSS Collaboration	·	800 m	MPC · JPL
620339	2002 RM_{281}	—	September 12, 2002	Palomar	NEAT	·	1.2 km	MPC · JPL
620340	2002 RL_{282}	—	October 8, 2007	Kitt Peak	Spacewatch	·	1.6 km	MPC · JPL
620341	2002 RZ_{289}	—	September 4, 2002	Palomar	NEAT	·	860 m	MPC · JPL
620342	2002 RQ_{293}	—	November 8, 2008	Mount Lemmon	Mount Lemmon Survey	·	2.0 km	MPC · JPL
620343	2002 RU_{293}	—	September 9, 2002	Palomar	NEAT	·	670 m	MPC · JPL
620344	2002 RL_{295}	—	September 3, 2002	Palomar	NEAT	·	1.3 km	MPC · JPL
620345	2002 RB_{298}	—	October 3, 2006	Mount Lemmon	Mount Lemmon Survey	·	980 m	MPC · JPL
620346	2002 RR_{298}	—	May 27, 2009	Mount Lemmon	Mount Lemmon Survey	NYS	760 m	MPC · JPL
620347	2002 RR_{300}	—	August 31, 2011	Piszkéstető	K. Sárneczky	EUN	1.0 km	MPC · JPL
620348	2002 RG_{301}	—	February 9, 2005	Kitt Peak	Spacewatch	·	2.6 km	MPC · JPL
620349	2002 SX_{17}	—	September 26, 2002	Palomar	NEAT	EOS	2.5 km	MPC · JPL
620350	2002 SJ_{37}	—	September 29, 2002	Haleakala	NEAT	·	1.0 km	MPC · JPL
620351	2002 SL_{51}	—	September 11, 2002	Haleakala	NEAT	NYS	810 m	MPC · JPL
620352	2002 SG_{71}	—	September 26, 2002	Palomar	NEAT	·	980 m	MPC · JPL
620353	2002 TH_{69}	—	October 4, 2002	Socorro	LINEAR	·	1.2 km	MPC · JPL
620354	2002 TJ_{106}	—	October 4, 2002	Palomar	NEAT	·	3.1 km	MPC · JPL
620355	2002 TV_{129}	—	October 4, 2002	Palomar	NEAT	JUN	900 m	MPC · JPL
620356	2002 TK_{141}	—	October 5, 2002	Kitt Peak	Spacewatch	·	2.0 km	MPC · JPL
620357	2002 TQ_{160}	—	October 5, 2002	Palomar	NEAT	·	2.4 km	MPC · JPL
620358	2002 TE_{192}	—	October 6, 2002	Socorro	LINEAR	·	1.5 km	MPC · JPL
620359	2002 TX_{196}	—	September 30, 2002	Socorro	LINEAR	·	3.7 km	MPC · JPL
620360	2002 TT_{206}	—	October 4, 2002	Socorro	LINEAR	·	1.4 km	MPC · JPL
620361	2002 TK_{247}	—	October 10, 2002	Kitt Peak	Spacewatch	3:2	4.3 km	MPC · JPL
620362	2002 TN_{248}	—	October 3, 2002	Socorro	LINEAR	·	1.9 km	MPC · JPL
620363	2002 TV_{379}	—	October 10, 2002	Apache Point	SDSS Collaboration	H	310 m	MPC · JPL
620364	2002 TL_{380}	—	November 16, 2006	Kitt Peak	Spacewatch	·	920 m	MPC · JPL
620365	2002 TD_{381}	—	November 6, 2002	Kitt Peak	Spacewatch	·	950 m	MPC · JPL
620366	2002 TY_{383}	—	October 3, 2002	Palomar	NEAT	·	830 m	MPC · JPL
620367	2002 TV_{386}	—	October 8, 2002	Palomar	NEAT	·	2.9 km	MPC · JPL
620368	2002 TR_{388}	—	October 6, 2002	Palomar	NEAT	·	750 m	MPC · JPL
620369	2002 TF_{390}	—	March 27, 2008	Mount Lemmon	Mount Lemmon Survey	·	830 m	MPC · JPL
620370	2002 TK_{390}	—	November 27, 2013	Haleakala	Pan-STARRS 1	·	870 m	MPC · JPL
620371	2002 TU_{393}	—	September 10, 2007	Mount Lemmon	Mount Lemmon Survey	THM	1.9 km	MPC · JPL
620372	2002 UK_{9}	—	October 28, 2002	Palomar	NEAT	·	1.8 km	MPC · JPL
620373	2002 UN_{36}	—	October 31, 2002	Palomar	NEAT	·	1.3 km	MPC · JPL
620374	2002 UG_{74}	—	October 30, 2002	Palomar	NEAT	·	1.7 km	MPC · JPL
620375	2002 UT_{77}	—	October 29, 2002	Palomar	NEAT	·	750 m	MPC · JPL
620376	2002 UO_{79}	—	November 19, 2008	Kitt Peak	Spacewatch	·	2.3 km	MPC · JPL
620377	2002 US_{80}	—	March 15, 2012	Kitt Peak	Spacewatch	·	880 m	MPC · JPL
620378	2002 UC_{82}	—	August 16, 2009	Kitt Peak	Spacewatch	·	730 m	MPC · JPL
620379	2002 VJ_{25}	—	November 5, 2002	Socorro	LINEAR	·	1.7 km	MPC · JPL
620380	2002 VE_{125}	—	November 13, 2002	Palomar	NEAT	·	1.7 km	MPC · JPL
620381	2002 VA_{126}	—	November 15, 2002	Palomar	NEAT	·	1.4 km	MPC · JPL
620382	2002 VR_{143}	—	November 4, 2002	Palomar	NEAT	NYS	650 m	MPC · JPL
620383	2002 VF_{149}	—	August 23, 2007	Kitt Peak	Spacewatch	·	1.7 km	MPC · JPL
620384	2002 VY_{149}	—	May 14, 2008	Siding Spring	SSS	PHO	1.3 km	MPC · JPL
620385	2002 WP_{31}	—	November 24, 2002	Palomar	NEAT	L5	10 km	MPC · JPL
620386	2002 XZ_{4}	—	October 10, 2002	Palomar	NEAT	·	1.8 km	MPC · JPL
620387	2002 XP_{19}	—	December 2, 2002	Socorro	LINEAR	·	2.2 km	MPC · JPL
620388	2002 XY_{68}	—	December 13, 2002	Socorro	LINEAR	·	1.6 km	MPC · JPL
620389	2002 XU_{122}	—	October 8, 2008	Mount Lemmon	Mount Lemmon Survey	·	410 m	MPC · JPL
620390	2003 AY_{22}	—	January 7, 2003	Socorro	LINEAR	H	700 m	MPC · JPL
620391	2003 AJ_{93}	—	January 2, 2003	La Silla	Heidelberg InfraRed/Optical Cluster Survey	·	1.8 km	MPC · JPL
620392	2003 BK_{5}	—	January 24, 2003	La Silla	A. Boattini, Hainaut, O.	615	930 m	MPC · JPL
620393	2003 BT_{96}	—	June 12, 2011	Mount Lemmon	Mount Lemmon Survey	·	3.0 km	MPC · JPL
620394	2003 HG_{63}	—	April 7, 2011	Kitt Peak	Spacewatch	·	710 m	MPC · JPL
620395	2003 JF_{20}	—	October 9, 2007	Mount Lemmon	Mount Lemmon Survey	·	450 m	MPC · JPL
620396	2003 JC_{21}	—	May 1, 2003	Kitt Peak	Spacewatch	·	1.4 km	MPC · JPL
620397	2003 KQ_{31}	—	May 26, 2003	Kitt Peak	Spacewatch	·	550 m	MPC · JPL
620398	2003 KA_{38}	—	May 25, 2003	Kitt Peak	Spacewatch	·	560 m	MPC · JPL
620399	2003 KT_{38}	—	November 17, 2014	Mount Lemmon	Mount Lemmon Survey	H	310 m	MPC · JPL
620400	2003 PK_{13}	—	May 23, 2006	Kitt Peak	Spacewatch	·	460 m	MPC · JPL

== 620401–620500 ==
back to top

Designation			Discovery			Properties		Ref
Permanent	Provisional	Named after	Date	Site	Discoverer(s)	Category	Diam.	Ref
620401	2003 QM_{28}	—	August 22, 2003	Campo Imperatore	CINEOS	·	500 m	MPC · JPL
620402	2003 QO_{98}	—	August 21, 2003	Palomar	NEAT	·	540 m	MPC · JPL
620403	2003 QG_{112}	—	August 20, 2003	Campo Imperatore	CINEOS	·	540 m	MPC · JPL
620404	2003 QS_{112}	—	August 23, 2003	Palomar	NEAT	·	1.1 km	MPC · JPL
620405	2003 QU_{122}	—	September 19, 2014	Haleakala	Pan-STARRS 1	·	660 m	MPC · JPL
620406	2003 QS_{124}	—	August 25, 2003	Cerro Tololo	Deep Ecliptic Survey	·	430 m	MPC · JPL
620407	2003 RH_{28}	—	July 14, 2013	Haleakala	Pan-STARRS 1	·	1.3 km	MPC · JPL
620408	2003 SP_{3}	—	September 16, 2003	Kitt Peak	Spacewatch	EUN	860 m	MPC · JPL
620409	2003 SG_{18}	—	August 22, 2003	Palomar	NEAT	·	480 m	MPC · JPL
620410	2003 SN_{68}	—	September 17, 2003	Kitt Peak	Spacewatch	·	1.4 km	MPC · JPL
620411	2003 SS_{72}	—	September 18, 2003	Kitt Peak	Spacewatch	HNS	820 m	MPC · JPL
620412	2003 SH_{81}	—	September 19, 2003	Kitt Peak	Spacewatch	·	650 m	MPC · JPL
620413	2003 SC_{90}	—	September 18, 2003	Palomar	NEAT	EOS	1.9 km	MPC · JPL
620414	2003 SL_{136}	—	September 19, 2003	Campo Imperatore	CINEOS	·	2.2 km	MPC · JPL
620415	2003 SO_{171}	—	August 28, 2003	Palomar	NEAT	·	1.0 km	MPC · JPL
620416	2003 SC_{241}	—	September 27, 2003	Kitt Peak	Spacewatch	·	1.8 km	MPC · JPL
620417	2003 SP_{264}	—	September 17, 2003	Campo Imperatore	CINEOS	·	610 m	MPC · JPL
620418	2003 SN_{300}	—	September 19, 2003	Kitt Peak	Spacewatch	·	1.4 km	MPC · JPL
620419	2003 SX_{322}	—	September 16, 2003	Kitt Peak	Spacewatch	·	560 m	MPC · JPL
620420	2003 SA_{326}	—	September 18, 2003	Palomar	NEAT	PHO	550 m	MPC · JPL
620421	2003 SO_{336}	—	September 27, 2003	Apache Point	SDSS Collaboration	·	910 m	MPC · JPL
620422	2003 SU_{355}	—	September 28, 2003	Socorro	LINEAR	·	1.2 km	MPC · JPL
620423	2003 SK_{367}	—	September 26, 2003	Apache Point	SDSS Collaboration	(5)	780 m	MPC · JPL
620424	2003 SJ_{370}	—	September 17, 2003	Kitt Peak	Spacewatch	·	1.9 km	MPC · JPL
620425	2003 SC_{398}	—	September 26, 2003	Apache Point	SDSS Collaboration	·	1.9 km	MPC · JPL
620426	2003 SF_{445}	—	September 18, 2003	Kitt Peak	Spacewatch	EOS	1.3 km	MPC · JPL
620427	2003 SE_{447}	—	August 1, 2013	Haleakala	Pan-STARRS 1	·	550 m	MPC · JPL
620428	2003 SJ_{447}	—	October 13, 2010	Mount Lemmon	Mount Lemmon Survey	·	500 m	MPC · JPL
620429	2003 SV_{450}	—	September 4, 2008	Kitt Peak	Spacewatch	·	1.4 km	MPC · JPL
620430	2003 SM_{451}	—	September 29, 2003	Kitt Peak	Spacewatch	·	2.0 km	MPC · JPL
620431	2003 SP_{456}	—	October 24, 1995	Kitt Peak	Spacewatch	·	570 m	MPC · JPL
620432	2003 SQ_{456}	—	September 29, 2003	Kitt Peak	Spacewatch	(5)	950 m	MPC · JPL
620433	2003 SV_{457}	—	September 19, 2003	Kitt Peak	Spacewatch	EOS	1.4 km	MPC · JPL
620434	2003 SY_{459}	—	October 2, 1999	Kitt Peak	Spacewatch	·	750 m	MPC · JPL
620435	2003 SC_{463}	—	September 19, 2003	Palomar	NEAT	·	520 m	MPC · JPL
620436	2003 SC_{465}	—	September 18, 2003	Kitt Peak	Spacewatch	·	530 m	MPC · JPL
620437	2003 TR_{22}	—	October 1, 2003	Kitt Peak	Spacewatch	EOS	1.5 km	MPC · JPL
620438	2003 TF_{25}	—	October 1, 2003	Kitt Peak	Spacewatch	·	490 m	MPC · JPL
620439	2003 TH_{28}	—	October 1, 2003	Kitt Peak	Spacewatch	V	450 m	MPC · JPL
620440	2003 TC_{31}	—	October 1, 2003	Kitt Peak	Spacewatch	·	650 m	MPC · JPL
620441	2003 TP_{57}	—	October 6, 2003	Desert Eagle	W. K. Y. Yeung	(5)	1.0 km	MPC · JPL
620442	2003 TQ_{57}	—	September 28, 2003	Kitt Peak	Spacewatch	·	2.2 km	MPC · JPL
620443	2003 TH_{60}	—	October 3, 2003	Kitt Peak	Spacewatch	·	710 m	MPC · JPL
620444	2003 TO_{61}	—	October 15, 2003	Anderson Mesa	LONEOS	·	700 m	MPC · JPL
620445	2003 TE_{62}	—	October 3, 2003	Kitt Peak	Spacewatch	·	820 m	MPC · JPL
620446	2003 TG_{62}	—	September 25, 2016	Haleakala	Pan-STARRS 1	·	1.3 km	MPC · JPL
620447	2003 TT_{62}	—	August 7, 2008	Kitt Peak	Spacewatch	·	1.9 km	MPC · JPL
620448	2003 TP_{63}	—	October 4, 2003	Kitt Peak	Spacewatch	·	1.0 km	MPC · JPL
620449	2003 TC_{64}	—	September 13, 2013	Mount Lemmon	Mount Lemmon Survey	·	530 m	MPC · JPL
620450	2003 TH_{64}	—	April 19, 2007	Mount Lemmon	Mount Lemmon Survey	EOS	1.7 km	MPC · JPL
620451	2003 UK_{31}	—	September 16, 2003	Kitt Peak	Spacewatch	·	620 m	MPC · JPL
620452	2003 UM_{59}	—	September 21, 2003	Palomar	NEAT	·	1.6 km	MPC · JPL
620453	2003 UH_{119}	—	October 18, 2003	Palomar	NEAT	·	1.2 km	MPC · JPL
620454	2003 UC_{157}	—	December 27, 1999	Kitt Peak	Spacewatch	·	1.1 km	MPC · JPL
620455	2003 UC_{291}	—	November 8, 1996	Kitt Peak	Spacewatch	·	700 m	MPC · JPL
620456	2003 UQ_{294}	—	October 16, 2003	Kitt Peak	Spacewatch	·	1.2 km	MPC · JPL
620457	2003 UG_{304}	—	September 27, 2003	Kitt Peak	Spacewatch	·	1.8 km	MPC · JPL
620458	2003 UE_{331}	—	October 18, 2003	Apache Point	SDSS Collaboration	·	880 m	MPC · JPL
620459	2003 UY_{343}	—	October 19, 2003	Kitt Peak	Spacewatch	·	2.0 km	MPC · JPL
620460	2003 UF_{346}	—	September 29, 2003	Kitt Peak	Spacewatch	·	1.1 km	MPC · JPL
620461	2003 UY_{355}	—	October 19, 2003	Kitt Peak	Spacewatch	·	1.9 km	MPC · JPL
620462	2003 UM_{356}	—	September 28, 2003	Kitt Peak	Spacewatch	·	2.2 km	MPC · JPL
620463	2003 UL_{357}	—	September 29, 2003	Kitt Peak	Spacewatch	THM	1.8 km	MPC · JPL
620464	2003 UG_{358}	—	September 28, 2003	Kitt Peak	Spacewatch	·	1.0 km	MPC · JPL
620465	2003 UV_{391}	—	October 22, 2003	Apache Point	SDSS Collaboration	·	860 m	MPC · JPL
620466	2003 UH_{407}	—	October 23, 2003	Apache Point	SDSS Collaboration	VER	1.8 km	MPC · JPL
620467	2003 UD_{411}	—	October 23, 2003	Apache Point	SDSS Collaboration	·	2.4 km	MPC · JPL
620468	2003 UN_{421}	—	October 23, 2003	Kitt Peak	Spacewatch	·	610 m	MPC · JPL
620469	2003 UU_{423}	—	October 29, 2010	Kitt Peak	Spacewatch	·	600 m	MPC · JPL
620470	2003 UU_{424}	—	October 21, 2003	Kitt Peak	Spacewatch	·	1.2 km	MPC · JPL
620471	2003 UC_{426}	—	August 14, 2013	Haleakala	Pan-STARRS 1	·	520 m	MPC · JPL
620472	2003 UA_{428}	—	August 24, 2008	Kitt Peak	Spacewatch	EOS	1.3 km	MPC · JPL
620473	2003 UQ_{436}	—	September 17, 2017	Haleakala	Pan-STARRS 1	·	590 m	MPC · JPL
620474	2003 US_{438}	—	April 15, 2012	Haleakala	Pan-STARRS 1	VER	2.1 km	MPC · JPL
620475	2003 UG_{439}	—	August 10, 2007	Kitt Peak	Spacewatch	·	930 m	MPC · JPL
620476	2003 VC_{7}	—	November 15, 2003	Kitt Peak	Spacewatch	·	2.9 km	MPC · JPL
620477	2003 WD_{53}	—	October 22, 2003	Kitt Peak	Spacewatch	·	2.0 km	MPC · JPL
620478	2003 WJ_{53}	—	November 20, 2003	Kitt Peak	Spacewatch	·	2.0 km	MPC · JPL
620479	2003 WA_{100}	—	November 20, 2003	Socorro	LINEAR	·	3.3 km	MPC · JPL
620480	2003 WJ_{183}	—	November 26, 2003	Kitt Peak	Spacewatch	·	1.9 km	MPC · JPL
620481	2003 WB_{196}	—	November 19, 2003	Campo Imperatore	CINEOS	·	720 m	MPC · JPL
620482	2003 WS_{198}	—	November 6, 2010	Mount Lemmon	Mount Lemmon Survey	PHO	690 m	MPC · JPL
620483	2003 WO_{200}	—	September 4, 2003	Kitt Peak	Spacewatch	NYS	770 m	MPC · JPL
620484	2003 WY_{201}	—	October 4, 2007	Mount Lemmon	Mount Lemmon Survey	·	1.1 km	MPC · JPL
620485	2003 WE_{207}	—	October 25, 2014	Haleakala	Pan-STARRS 1	·	2.1 km	MPC · JPL
620486	2003 WH_{209}	—	August 3, 2011	Haleakala	Pan-STARRS 1	·	1.0 km	MPC · JPL
620487	2003 WL_{210}	—	March 24, 2006	Kitt Peak	Spacewatch	·	920 m	MPC · JPL
620488	2003 WD_{211}	—	June 29, 2011	Charleston	R. Holmes	·	1.1 km	MPC · JPL
620489	2003 YQ_{9}	—	December 17, 2003	Socorro	LINEAR	PHO	1.2 km	MPC · JPL
620490	2003 YH_{107}	—	December 23, 2003	Socorro	LINEAR	BAR	930 m	MPC · JPL
620491	2004 AW_{2}	—	January 14, 2004	Palomar	NEAT	·	1.2 km	MPC · JPL
620492	2004 BT_{65}	—	January 16, 2004	Kitt Peak	Spacewatch	·	530 m	MPC · JPL
620493	2004 BQ_{168}	—	January 30, 2004	Kitt Peak	Spacewatch	HNS	940 m	MPC · JPL
620494	2004 CP_{132}	—	September 2, 1994	Kitt Peak	Spacewatch	(5)	1.0 km	MPC · JPL
620495	2004 DH_{82}	—	March 2, 2009	Kitt Peak	Spacewatch	·	1.5 km	MPC · JPL
620496	2004 EF_{85}	—	March 15, 2004	Socorro	LINEAR	·	1.8 km	MPC · JPL
620497	2004 FP_{172}	—	March 15, 2008	Mount Lemmon	Mount Lemmon Survey	PHO	820 m	MPC · JPL
620498	2004 FL_{176}	—	March 31, 2009	Kitt Peak	Spacewatch	·	1.5 km	MPC · JPL
620499	2004 GF_{89}	—	April 13, 2004	Palomar	NEAT	PHO	990 m	MPC · JPL
620500	2004 HR_{64}	—	April 16, 2004	Kitt Peak	Spacewatch	·	690 m	MPC · JPL

== 620501–620600 ==
back to top

Designation			Discovery			Properties		Ref
Permanent	Provisional	Named after	Date	Site	Discoverer(s)	Category	Diam.	Ref
620501	2004 HD_{73}	—	April 28, 2004	Kitt Peak	Spacewatch	·	990 m	MPC · JPL
620502	2004 HP_{79}	—	April 26, 2004	Mauna Kea	CFHT Legacy Survey	twotino	178 km	MPC · JPL
620503	2004 JW_{29}	—	July 26, 2001	Palomar	NEAT	·	650 m	MPC · JPL
620504	2004 JY_{56}	—	November 4, 2005	Kitt Peak	Spacewatch	·	1.0 km	MPC · JPL
620505	2004 PW_{6}	—	August 6, 2004	Palomar	NEAT	PHO	1.1 km	MPC · JPL
620506	2004 PY_{17}	—	August 8, 2004	Socorro	LINEAR	PHO	890 m	MPC · JPL
620507	2004 PU_{106}	—	August 15, 2004	Campo Imperatore	CINEOS	·	1.5 km	MPC · JPL
620508	2004 QC_{34}	—	September 2, 2014	Haleakala	Pan-STARRS 1	·	450 m	MPC · JPL
620509	2004 RJ_{86}	—	September 7, 2004	Socorro	LINEAR	·	1.3 km	MPC · JPL
620510	2004 RX_{108}	—	September 9, 2004	Kitt Peak	Spacewatch	·	520 m	MPC · JPL
620511	2004 RZ_{269}	—	September 11, 2004	Kitt Peak	Spacewatch	·	1.4 km	MPC · JPL
620512	2004 RZ_{277}	—	September 13, 2004	Kitt Peak	Spacewatch	·	460 m	MPC · JPL
620513	2004 RQ_{303}	—	August 23, 2004	Kitt Peak	Spacewatch	·	930 m	MPC · JPL
620514	2004 RW_{303}	—	August 23, 2004	Kitt Peak	Spacewatch	·	1.7 km	MPC · JPL
620515	2004 RO_{357}	—	April 13, 2013	Haleakala	Pan-STARRS 1	·	630 m	MPC · JPL
620516	2004 RY_{359}	—	September 7, 2004	Kitt Peak	Spacewatch	·	410 m	MPC · JPL
620517	2004 RJ_{361}	—	January 16, 2011	Mount Lemmon	Mount Lemmon Survey	·	1.6 km	MPC · JPL
620518	2004 RO_{361}	—	August 20, 2009	Kitt Peak	Spacewatch	KOR	1.1 km	MPC · JPL
620519	2004 RV_{363}	—	August 18, 2014	Haleakala	Pan-STARRS 1	·	1.5 km	MPC · JPL
620520	2004 TG_{118}	—	October 5, 2004	Anderson Mesa	LONEOS	·	550 m	MPC · JPL
620521	2004 TJ_{201}	—	October 7, 2004	Kitt Peak	Spacewatch	·	1.6 km	MPC · JPL
620522	2004 TG_{229}	—	October 8, 2004	Kitt Peak	Spacewatch	·	490 m	MPC · JPL
620523	2004 TE_{235}	—	October 8, 2004	Kitt Peak	Spacewatch	·	430 m	MPC · JPL
620524	2004 TN_{327}	—	October 15, 2004	Anderson Mesa	LONEOS	PHO	1.1 km	MPC · JPL
620525	2004 TN_{373}	—	October 8, 2004	Palomar	NEAT	H	480 m	MPC · JPL
620526	2004 TZ_{373}	—	October 13, 2014	Mount Lemmon	Mount Lemmon Survey	·	630 m	MPC · JPL
620527	2004 TQ_{374}	—	September 19, 2007	Kitt Peak	Spacewatch	·	490 m	MPC · JPL
620528	2004 TB_{383}	—	September 21, 2012	Mount Lemmon	Mount Lemmon Survey	·	720 m	MPC · JPL
620529	2004 TA_{385}	—	October 7, 2004	Kitt Peak	Spacewatch	·	1.5 km	MPC · JPL
620530	2004 TJ_{386}	—	October 11, 2004	Kitt Peak	Deep Ecliptic Survey	EOS	1.3 km	MPC · JPL
620531	2004 VT_{97}	—	October 15, 2004	Kitt Peak	Deep Ecliptic Survey	·	1.3 km	MPC · JPL
620532	2004 VM_{102}	—	November 3, 2004	Kitt Peak	Spacewatch	·	1.3 km	MPC · JPL
620533	2004 VG_{133}	—	October 4, 2007	Mount Lemmon	Mount Lemmon Survey	·	510 m	MPC · JPL
620534	2004 WA_{13}	—	September 10, 2007	Mount Lemmon	Mount Lemmon Survey	·	640 m	MPC · JPL
620535	2004 XY_{44}	—	December 12, 2004	Mauna Kea	D. J. Tholen, F. Bernardi	·	460 m	MPC · JPL
620536	2004 XT_{75}	—	September 18, 2003	Kitt Peak	Spacewatch	3:2	5.9 km	MPC · JPL
620537	2004 XV_{89}	—	December 11, 2004	Kitt Peak	Spacewatch	EOS	1.5 km	MPC · JPL
620538	2004 XW_{154}	—	December 15, 2004	Kitt Peak	Spacewatch	·	970 m	MPC · JPL
620539	2004 XJ_{189}	—	December 15, 2004	Mauna Kea	P. A. Wiegert, D. D. Balam	·	2.0 km	MPC · JPL
620540	2004 YJ_{19}	—	December 19, 2004	Mount Lemmon	Mount Lemmon Survey	·	1.4 km	MPC · JPL
620541	2005 BB_{12}	—	January 17, 2005	Kitt Peak	Spacewatch	·	1.5 km	MPC · JPL
620542	2005 BJ_{49}	—	October 19, 2003	Kitt Peak	Spacewatch	·	1.9 km	MPC · JPL
620543	2005 BR_{52}	—	December 8, 2012	Nogales	M. Schwartz, P. R. Holvorcem	·	1.3 km	MPC · JPL
620544	2005 BJ_{53}	—	September 13, 2007	Mount Lemmon	Mount Lemmon Survey	·	870 m	MPC · JPL
620545	2005 CY_{33}	—	February 2, 2005	Kitt Peak	Spacewatch	·	1.1 km	MPC · JPL
620546	2005 CQ_{85}	—	February 4, 2005	Kitt Peak	Spacewatch	·	610 m	MPC · JPL
620547	2005 CR_{85}	—	October 21, 2017	Mount Lemmon	Mount Lemmon Survey	·	800 m	MPC · JPL
620548	2005 CW_{86}	—	September 14, 2013	Kitt Peak	Spacewatch	EOS	1.7 km	MPC · JPL
620549	2005 CD_{89}	—	February 9, 2005	Kitt Peak	Spacewatch	·	1.1 km	MPC · JPL
620550	2005 EZ_{41}	—	February 4, 2005	Kitt Peak	Spacewatch	·	1.1 km	MPC · JPL
620551	2005 EA_{147}	—	March 10, 2005	Mount Lemmon	Mount Lemmon Survey	·	750 m	MPC · JPL
620552	2005 EE_{298}	—	March 11, 2005	Kitt Peak	Deep Ecliptic Survey	·	650 m	MPC · JPL
620553	2005 EA_{322}	—	October 12, 2010	Mount Lemmon	Mount Lemmon Survey	·	660 m	MPC · JPL
620554	2005 EJ_{337}	—	August 8, 2013	Kitt Peak	Spacewatch	VER	2.0 km	MPC · JPL
620555	2005 EU_{337}	—	September 1, 2013	Mount Lemmon	Mount Lemmon Survey	·	500 m	MPC · JPL
620556	2005 EQ_{340}	—	September 29, 2011	Mount Lemmon	Mount Lemmon Survey	MAR	770 m	MPC · JPL
620557	2005 EW_{344}	—	November 14, 2010	Kitt Peak	Spacewatch	·	550 m	MPC · JPL
620558	2005 EN_{348}	—	March 10, 2005	Mount Lemmon	Mount Lemmon Survey	·	820 m	MPC · JPL
620559	2005 FH_{18}	—	March 16, 2012	Haleakala	Pan-STARRS 1	·	940 m	MPC · JPL
620560	2005 GP_{25}	—	April 2, 2005	Mount Lemmon	Mount Lemmon Survey	·	630 m	MPC · JPL
620561	2005 GF_{66}	—	April 2, 2005	Mount Lemmon	Mount Lemmon Survey	·	700 m	MPC · JPL
620562	2005 GO_{80}	—	April 7, 2005	Kitt Peak	Spacewatch	·	1.2 km	MPC · JPL
620563	2005 GE_{107}	—	April 2, 2005	Mount Lemmon	Mount Lemmon Survey	·	2.6 km	MPC · JPL
620564	2005 GS_{115}	—	April 11, 2005	Kitt Peak	Spacewatch	·	2.5 km	MPC · JPL
620565	2005 GE_{117}	—	April 11, 2005	Kitt Peak	Spacewatch	·	840 m	MPC · JPL
620566	2005 GA_{147}	—	April 11, 2005	Kitt Peak	Spacewatch	·	1.7 km	MPC · JPL
620567	2005 GS_{155}	—	April 10, 2005	Mount Lemmon	Mount Lemmon Survey	V	470 m	MPC · JPL
620568	2005 GG_{167}	—	April 11, 2005	Mount Lemmon	Mount Lemmon Survey	·	790 m	MPC · JPL
620569	2005 GN_{230}	—	April 7, 2005	Kitt Peak	Spacewatch	·	700 m	MPC · JPL
620570	2005 GH_{231}	—	February 21, 2012	Kitt Peak	Spacewatch	·	1.1 km	MPC · JPL
620571	2005 GR_{235}	—	April 2, 2005	Kitt Peak	Spacewatch	·	1.3 km	MPC · JPL
620572	2005 GG_{236}	—	September 15, 2006	Kitt Peak	Spacewatch	·	1.1 km	MPC · JPL
620573	2005 HK_{12}	—	October 31, 2006	Mount Lemmon	Mount Lemmon Survey	·	850 m	MPC · JPL
620574	2005 JD_{55}	—	May 4, 2005	Kitt Peak	Spacewatch	·	840 m	MPC · JPL
620575	2005 JF_{66}	—	May 4, 2005	Mount Lemmon	Mount Lemmon Survey	EUN	1.1 km	MPC · JPL
620576	2005 JL_{86}	—	April 17, 2005	Kitt Peak	Spacewatch	EUN	860 m	MPC · JPL
620577	2005 JS_{140}	—	June 18, 2015	Haleakala	Pan-STARRS 1	·	1.5 km	MPC · JPL
620578	2005 JM_{163}	—	May 9, 2005	Kitt Peak	Spacewatch	·	1.8 km	MPC · JPL
620579	2005 JY_{191}	—	February 24, 2012	Haleakala	Pan-STARRS 1	·	910 m	MPC · JPL
620580	2005 JF_{192}	—	April 30, 2014	Haleakala	Pan-STARRS 1	·	1.2 km	MPC · JPL
620581	2005 JL_{192}	—	June 5, 2016	Haleakala	Pan-STARRS 1	·	720 m	MPC · JPL
620582	2005 JP_{192}	—	May 13, 2005	Kitt Peak	Spacewatch	·	1.6 km	MPC · JPL
620583	2005 KR_{10}	—	May 21, 2005	Palomar	NEAT	·	1.1 km	MPC · JPL
620584	2005 LR_{11}	—	June 3, 2005	Kitt Peak	Spacewatch	·	2.4 km	MPC · JPL
620585	2005 LA_{46}	—	June 13, 2005	Kitt Peak	Spacewatch	·	720 m	MPC · JPL
620586	2005 MC_{23}	—	June 28, 2005	Haleakala	NEAT	·	2.4 km	MPC · JPL
620587	2005 MD_{40}	—	June 30, 2005	Kitt Peak	Spacewatch	·	1.5 km	MPC · JPL
620588	2005 MZ_{55}	—	June 9, 2012	Nogales	M. Schwartz, P. R. Holvorcem	PHO	660 m	MPC · JPL
620589	2005 NT_{3}	—	July 1, 2005	Kitt Peak	Spacewatch	·	880 m	MPC · JPL
620590	2005 NA_{25}	—	July 4, 2005	Kitt Peak	Spacewatch	·	1.7 km	MPC · JPL
620591	2005 NT_{44}	—	July 5, 2005	Mount Lemmon	Mount Lemmon Survey	·	790 m	MPC · JPL
620592	2005 NH_{50}	—	June 27, 2005	Kitt Peak	Spacewatch	·	1.5 km	MPC · JPL
620593	2005 NZ_{74}	—	July 9, 2005	Kitt Peak	Spacewatch	·	840 m	MPC · JPL
620594	2005 NF_{98}	—	July 9, 2005	Kitt Peak	Spacewatch	·	830 m	MPC · JPL
620595	2005 NJ_{118}	—	July 7, 2005	Mauna Kea	Veillet, C.	·	840 m	MPC · JPL
620596	2005 NT_{129}	—	September 27, 2009	Kitt Peak	Spacewatch	·	800 m	MPC · JPL
620597	2005 NR_{131}	—	November 16, 2006	Kitt Peak	Spacewatch	·	1.5 km	MPC · JPL
620598	2005 OZ_{12}	—	July 29, 2005	Palomar	NEAT	·	1.4 km	MPC · JPL
620599	2005 OR_{25}	—	July 31, 2005	Palomar	NEAT	·	900 m	MPC · JPL
620600	2005 OO_{33}	—	September 18, 2009	Mount Lemmon	Mount Lemmon Survey	MAS	670 m	MPC · JPL

== 620601–620700 ==
back to top

Designation			Discovery			Properties		Ref
Permanent	Provisional	Named after	Date	Site	Discoverer(s)	Category	Diam.	Ref
620601	2005 OY_{34}	—	July 29, 2005	Palomar	NEAT	·	910 m	MPC · JPL
620602	2005 OC_{35}	—	July 29, 2005	Palomar	NEAT	·	940 m	MPC · JPL
620603	2005 PN_{29}	—	August 6, 2005	Palomar	NEAT	NYS	750 m	MPC · JPL
620604	2005 QE	—	July 29, 2005	Palomar	NEAT	·	1.7 km	MPC · JPL
620605	2005 QZ_{28}	—	August 28, 2005	St. Véran	St. Veran	NYS	1.1 km	MPC · JPL
620606	2005 QW_{33}	—	August 25, 2005	Palomar	NEAT	NYS	850 m	MPC · JPL
620607	2005 QF_{52}	—	July 30, 2005	Palomar	NEAT	NYS	920 m	MPC · JPL
620608	2005 QZ_{60}	—	August 26, 2005	Palomar	NEAT	·	880 m	MPC · JPL
620609	2005 QM_{68}	—	July 4, 2005	Palomar	NEAT	·	1.4 km	MPC · JPL
620610	2005 QT_{72}	—	August 29, 2005	Kitt Peak	Spacewatch	·	1.8 km	MPC · JPL
620611	2005 QB_{86}	—	August 30, 2005	Kitt Peak	Spacewatch	·	1.7 km	MPC · JPL
620612	2005 QC_{105}	—	August 29, 2005	Kitt Peak	Spacewatch	·	990 m	MPC · JPL
620613	2005 QN_{133}	—	August 28, 2005	Kitt Peak	Spacewatch	MAS	520 m	MPC · JPL
620614	2005 QZ_{137}	—	August 28, 2005	Kitt Peak	Spacewatch	·	1.2 km	MPC · JPL
620615	2005 QG_{138}	—	August 28, 2005	Kitt Peak	Spacewatch	·	810 m	MPC · JPL
620616	2005 QK_{150}	—	August 28, 2005	Kitt Peak	Spacewatch	·	910 m	MPC · JPL
620617	2005 QE_{155}	—	August 28, 2005	Siding Spring	SSS	NYS	970 m	MPC · JPL
620618	2005 QX_{166}	—	August 6, 2005	Palomar	NEAT	·	2.2 km	MPC · JPL
620619	2005 QY_{172}	—	September 1, 2005	Kitt Peak	Spacewatch	·	1.6 km	MPC · JPL
620620	2005 QP_{185}	—	August 6, 2005	Palomar	NEAT	NYS	910 m	MPC · JPL
620621	2005 QB_{193}	—	August 29, 2005	Kitt Peak	Spacewatch	·	890 m	MPC · JPL
620622	2005 QD_{193}	—	September 15, 2010	Kitt Peak	Spacewatch	·	1.3 km	MPC · JPL
620623	2005 QJ_{194}	—	October 18, 2009	Mount Lemmon	Mount Lemmon Survey	NYS	750 m	MPC · JPL
620624	2005 QZ_{195}	—	August 28, 2005	Kitt Peak	Spacewatch	NYS	780 m	MPC · JPL
620625	2005 QS_{201}	—	August 30, 2005	Kitt Peak	Spacewatch	MAS	500 m	MPC · JPL
620626	2005 QV_{201}	—	August 3, 2016	Haleakala	Pan-STARRS 1	·	810 m	MPC · JPL
620627	2005 QG_{203}	—	August 29, 2005	Kitt Peak	Spacewatch	MAS	560 m	MPC · JPL
620628	2005 QV_{205}	—	August 30, 2005	Kitt Peak	Spacewatch	·	980 m	MPC · JPL
620629	2005 QJ_{206}	—	August 30, 2005	Kitt Peak	Spacewatch	V	500 m	MPC · JPL
620630	2005 RO_{58}	—	September 11, 2005	Kitt Peak	Spacewatch	·	1.5 km	MPC · JPL
620631	2005 RJ_{59}	—	September 13, 2005	Kitt Peak	Spacewatch	V	380 m	MPC · JPL
620632	2005 SZ_{16}	—	September 26, 2005	Kitt Peak	Spacewatch	NYS	860 m	MPC · JPL
620633	2005 SC_{51}	—	September 24, 2005	Kitt Peak	Spacewatch	·	1.6 km	MPC · JPL
620634	2005 SB_{59}	—	September 26, 2005	Kitt Peak	Spacewatch	MAS	650 m	MPC · JPL
620635	2005 SZ_{60}	—	September 26, 2005	Kitt Peak	Spacewatch	·	920 m	MPC · JPL
620636	2005 SF_{110}	—	October 13, 1994	Kitt Peak	Spacewatch	MAS	530 m	MPC · JPL
620637	2005 SN_{120}	—	September 29, 2005	Kitt Peak	Spacewatch	·	760 m	MPC · JPL
620638	2005 SU_{143}	—	September 25, 2005	Kitt Peak	Spacewatch	·	940 m	MPC · JPL
620639	2005 SY_{171}	—	September 29, 2005	Kitt Peak	Spacewatch	·	1.7 km	MPC · JPL
620640	2005 SE_{227}	—	September 30, 2005	Kitt Peak	Spacewatch	MAS	520 m	MPC · JPL
620641	2005 ST_{228}	—	September 14, 2005	Kitt Peak	Spacewatch	KOR	980 m	MPC · JPL
620642	2005 SD_{236}	—	September 29, 2005	Kitt Peak	Spacewatch	PHO	610 m	MPC · JPL
620643	2005 SH_{239}	—	August 30, 2005	Kitt Peak	Spacewatch	MAS	520 m	MPC · JPL
620644	2005 SB_{242}	—	September 30, 2005	Kitt Peak	Spacewatch	·	780 m	MPC · JPL
620645	2005 SO_{244}	—	September 30, 2005	Mount Lemmon	Mount Lemmon Survey	NYS	670 m	MPC · JPL
620646	2005 SH_{258}	—	July 29, 2000	Cerro Tololo	Deep Ecliptic Survey	·	1.6 km	MPC · JPL
620647	2005 TF_{7}	—	September 3, 2005	Palomar	NEAT	·	1.9 km	MPC · JPL
620648	2005 TX_{53}	—	October 1, 2005	Socorro	LINEAR	DOR	1.7 km	MPC · JPL
620649	2005 TP_{93}	—	October 6, 2005	Kitt Peak	Spacewatch	·	1.4 km	MPC · JPL
620650	2005 TS_{116}	—	October 3, 2005	Kitt Peak	Spacewatch	·	1.2 km	MPC · JPL
620651	2005 TN_{117}	—	September 26, 2005	Kitt Peak	Spacewatch	NYS	860 m	MPC · JPL
620652	2005 TR_{119}	—	September 26, 2005	Kitt Peak	Spacewatch	MAS	520 m	MPC · JPL
620653	2005 TK_{144}	—	September 29, 2005	Kitt Peak	Spacewatch	·	710 m	MPC · JPL
620654	2005 TM_{150}	—	September 29, 2005	Kitt Peak	Spacewatch	·	1.5 km	MPC · JPL
620655	2005 TK_{166}	—	October 9, 2005	Kitt Peak	Spacewatch	·	910 m	MPC · JPL
620656	2005 TO_{168}	—	September 29, 2005	Kitt Peak	Spacewatch	·	1.6 km	MPC · JPL
620657	2005 TK_{177}	—	August 29, 2005	Palomar	NEAT	·	1.6 km	MPC · JPL
620658	2005 TB_{200}	—	October 7, 2005	Mauna Kea	A. Boattini	L5	7.7 km	MPC · JPL
620659	2005 TD_{201}	—	October 9, 2005	Kitt Peak	Spacewatch	·	1.0 km	MPC · JPL
620660	2005 TT_{203}	—	June 24, 2014	Haleakala	Pan-STARRS 1	·	1.3 km	MPC · JPL
620661	2005 TV_{209}	—	August 10, 2016	Haleakala	Pan-STARRS 1	·	870 m	MPC · JPL
620662	2005 TC_{210}	—	July 14, 2016	Mount Lemmon	Mount Lemmon Survey	·	990 m	MPC · JPL
620663	2005 TK_{211}	—	October 2, 2010	Kitt Peak	Spacewatch	·	1.3 km	MPC · JPL
620664	2005 TR_{219}	—	October 1, 2005	Mount Lemmon	Mount Lemmon Survey	KOR	1.1 km	MPC · JPL
620665	2005 UE_{72}	—	September 13, 2005	Socorro	LINEAR	·	620 m	MPC · JPL
620666	2005 UC_{78}	—	September 27, 2005	Kitt Peak	Spacewatch	·	690 m	MPC · JPL
620667	2005 UH_{103}	—	October 22, 2005	Kitt Peak	Spacewatch	·	1.6 km	MPC · JPL
620668	2005 UC_{120}	—	September 30, 2005	Mount Lemmon	Mount Lemmon Survey	·	1.0 km	MPC · JPL
620669	2005 UL_{150}	—	October 7, 2005	Kitt Peak	Spacewatch	·	1.5 km	MPC · JPL
620670	2005 UR_{151}	—	October 26, 2005	Kitt Peak	Spacewatch	MAS	600 m	MPC · JPL
620671	2005 UJ_{208}	—	October 1, 2005	Mount Lemmon	Mount Lemmon Survey	KOR	1.1 km	MPC · JPL
620672	2005 UR_{224}	—	October 25, 2005	Kitt Peak	Spacewatch	EOS	1.4 km	MPC · JPL
620673	2005 UZ_{224}	—	October 25, 2005	Kitt Peak	Spacewatch	·	1.5 km	MPC · JPL
620674	2005 UX_{286}	—	October 26, 2005	Kitt Peak	Spacewatch	·	1.6 km	MPC · JPL
620675	2005 UK_{316}	—	October 25, 2005	Mount Lemmon	Mount Lemmon Survey	·	1.0 km	MPC · JPL
620676	2005 UK_{387}	—	October 21, 1997	Kitt Peak	Spacewatch	·	970 m	MPC · JPL
620677	2005 UW_{395}	—	October 30, 2005	Catalina	CSS	·	1.5 km	MPC · JPL
620678	2005 UH_{409}	—	October 31, 2005	Mount Lemmon	Mount Lemmon Survey	·	1 km	MPC · JPL
620679	2005 UB_{449}	—	October 26, 2005	Kitt Peak	Spacewatch	·	1.7 km	MPC · JPL
620680	2005 UE_{469}	—	October 30, 2005	Kitt Peak	Spacewatch	·	780 m	MPC · JPL
620681	2005 UY_{486}	—	September 3, 2005	Palomar	NEAT	·	2.4 km	MPC · JPL
620682	2005 UV_{501}	—	October 22, 2005	Kitt Peak	Spacewatch	·	1.1 km	MPC · JPL
620683	2005 UQ_{515}	—	October 27, 2005	Apache Point	SDSS Collaboration	·	1.1 km	MPC · JPL
620684	2005 UD_{527}	—	October 29, 2005	Mount Lemmon	Mount Lemmon Survey	·	1.4 km	MPC · JPL
620685	2005 UP_{537}	—	January 5, 2011	Mount Lemmon	Mount Lemmon Survey	·	1.6 km	MPC · JPL
620686	2005 UP_{541}	—	July 7, 2016	Haleakala	Pan-STARRS 1	·	1.0 km	MPC · JPL
620687	2005 UB_{551}	—	November 4, 2005	Kitt Peak	Spacewatch	MAS	530 m	MPC · JPL
620688	2005 VG_{52}	—	October 28, 2005	Catalina	CSS	·	920 m	MPC · JPL
620689	2005 VL_{67}	—	November 5, 2005	Kitt Peak	Spacewatch	·	1.6 km	MPC · JPL
620690	2005 VH_{84}	—	October 27, 2005	Kitt Peak	Spacewatch	DOR	2.2 km	MPC · JPL
620691	2005 VJ_{130}	—	October 12, 2005	Kitt Peak	Spacewatch	·	1.0 km	MPC · JPL
620692	2005 VD_{146}	—	October 2, 2014	Haleakala	Pan-STARRS 1	TIN	580 m	MPC · JPL
620693	2005 VS_{152}	—	November 6, 2005	Kitt Peak	Spacewatch	·	880 m	MPC · JPL
620694	2005 WJ_{2}	—	November 22, 2005	Socorro	LINEAR	·	1.4 km	MPC · JPL
620695	2005 WJ_{52}	—	November 5, 2005	Kitt Peak	Spacewatch	PHO	840 m	MPC · JPL
620696	2005 WR_{72}	—	November 6, 2005	Kitt Peak	Spacewatch	·	810 m	MPC · JPL
620697	2005 WS_{125}	—	November 1, 2005	Kitt Peak	Spacewatch	KOR	1.0 km	MPC · JPL
620698	2005 WZ_{138}	—	October 10, 2001	Kitt Peak	Spacewatch	·	920 m	MPC · JPL
620699	2005 WZ_{207}	—	October 26, 2005	Kitt Peak	Spacewatch	·	820 m	MPC · JPL
620700	2005 WF_{214}	—	March 13, 2008	Kitt Peak	Spacewatch	·	1.8 km	MPC · JPL

== 620701–620800 ==
back to top

Designation			Discovery			Properties		Ref
Permanent	Provisional	Named after	Date	Site	Discoverer(s)	Category	Diam.	Ref
620701	2005 XU_{32}	—	December 4, 2005	Kitt Peak	Spacewatch	·	920 m	MPC · JPL
620702	2005 XK_{102}	—	December 1, 2005	Kitt Peak	Wasserman, L. H., Millis, R. L.	·	550 m	MPC · JPL
620703	2005 XQ_{103}	—	November 28, 1999	Kitt Peak	Spacewatch	·	1.5 km	MPC · JPL
620704	2005 XV_{106}	—	December 1, 2005	Kitt Peak	Wasserman, L. H., Millis, R. L.	·	2.0 km	MPC · JPL
620705	2005 YR_{101}	—	December 25, 2005	Kitt Peak	Spacewatch	·	1.8 km	MPC · JPL
620706	2005 YF_{106}	—	December 25, 2005	Kitt Peak	Spacewatch	·	820 m	MPC · JPL
620707	2005 YW_{177}	—	December 28, 2005	Kitt Peak	Spacewatch	·	900 m	MPC · JPL
620708	2005 YK_{222}	—	December 21, 2005	Kitt Peak	Spacewatch	·	680 m	MPC · JPL
620709	2005 YN_{296}	—	August 22, 2014	Haleakala	Pan-STARRS 1	·	1.6 km	MPC · JPL
620710	2005 YP_{298}	—	December 29, 2005	Kitt Peak	Spacewatch	·	790 m	MPC · JPL
620711	2006 AH_{25}	—	December 28, 2005	Mount Lemmon	Mount Lemmon Survey	·	1.5 km	MPC · JPL
620712	2006 AR_{26}	—	January 5, 2006	Kitt Peak	Spacewatch	·	480 m	MPC · JPL
620713	2006 AE_{52}	—	January 5, 2006	Kitt Peak	Spacewatch	·	800 m	MPC · JPL
620714	2006 AZ_{110}	—	June 1, 2012	Mount Lemmon	Mount Lemmon Survey	L5	9.6 km	MPC · JPL
620715	2006 BK_{86}	—	January 25, 2006	Kitt Peak	Spacewatch	L5	8.0 km	MPC · JPL
620716	2006 BY_{138}	—	February 22, 2002	Palomar	NEAT	·	1.2 km	MPC · JPL
620717	2006 BL_{169}	—	January 26, 2006	Mount Lemmon	Mount Lemmon Survey	L5	7.7 km	MPC · JPL
620718	2006 BB_{185}	—	January 28, 2006	Mount Lemmon	Mount Lemmon Survey	·	2.5 km	MPC · JPL
620719	2006 BV_{212}	—	February 2, 2006	Kitt Peak	Spacewatch	·	1.1 km	MPC · JPL
620720	2006 BC_{253}	—	December 1, 2005	Kitt Peak	Wasserman, L. H., Millis, R. L.	L5	8.0 km	MPC · JPL
620721	2006 BL_{268}	—	January 5, 2006	Catalina	CSS	EUN	1.2 km	MPC · JPL
620722	2006 BE_{288}	—	February 11, 2016	Haleakala	Pan-STARRS 1	·	600 m	MPC · JPL
620723	2006 BV_{288}	—	August 26, 2012	Haleakala	Pan-STARRS 1	·	970 m	MPC · JPL
620724	2006 BL_{294}	—	January 29, 2014	Mount Lemmon	Mount Lemmon Survey	·	830 m	MPC · JPL
620725	2006 BV_{298}	—	January 27, 2006	Mount Lemmon	Mount Lemmon Survey	·	480 m	MPC · JPL
620726	2006 BS_{302}	—	January 23, 2006	Kitt Peak	Spacewatch	·	1.9 km	MPC · JPL
620727	2006 CZ_{12}	—	February 1, 2006	Kitt Peak	Spacewatch	THM	1.6 km	MPC · JPL
620728	2006 CW_{72}	—	April 10, 2013	Haleakala	Pan-STARRS 1	·	490 m	MPC · JPL
620729	2006 CW_{81}	—	October 17, 2014	Mount Lemmon	Mount Lemmon Survey	·	570 m	MPC · JPL
620730	2006 CX_{82}	—	May 16, 2007	Mount Lemmon	Mount Lemmon Survey	·	540 m	MPC · JPL
620731	2006 DE_{75}	—	February 20, 2006	Kitt Peak	Spacewatch	·	1.5 km	MPC · JPL
620732	2006 DE_{113}	—	February 27, 2006	Kitt Peak	Spacewatch	·	540 m	MPC · JPL
620733	2006 DE_{171}	—	February 27, 2006	Kitt Peak	Spacewatch	·	500 m	MPC · JPL
620734	2006 DC_{221}	—	October 8, 2012	Haleakala	Pan-STARRS 1	·	780 m	MPC · JPL
620735	2006 DA_{224}	—	February 25, 2006	Mount Lemmon	Mount Lemmon Survey	·	460 m	MPC · JPL
620736	2006 ER_{68}	—	September 16, 2003	Kitt Peak	Spacewatch	·	1.1 km	MPC · JPL
620737	2006 EA_{77}	—	March 9, 2006	Mount Lemmon	Mount Lemmon Survey	·	490 m	MPC · JPL
620738	2006 ED_{79}	—	August 4, 2013	Haleakala	Pan-STARRS 1	EOS	1.3 km	MPC · JPL
620739	2006 FQ_{56}	—	March 25, 2006	Kitt Peak	Spacewatch	3:2 · SHU	5.5 km	MPC · JPL
620740	2006 GR_{43}	—	April 2, 2006	Kitt Peak	Spacewatch	·	530 m	MPC · JPL
620741	2006 GD_{45}	—	October 24, 2005	Mauna Kea	A. Boattini	MAS	720 m	MPC · JPL
620742	2006 HL_{10}	—	October 19, 2003	Apache Point	SDSS Collaboration	·	1.0 km	MPC · JPL
620743	2006 HD_{92}	—	April 29, 2006	Kitt Peak	Spacewatch	(5)	980 m	MPC · JPL
620744	2006 HZ_{99}	—	April 19, 2006	Kitt Peak	Spacewatch	EUN	930 m	MPC · JPL
620745	2006 HX_{101}	—	April 30, 2006	Kitt Peak	Spacewatch	·	460 m	MPC · JPL
620746	2006 HP_{109}	—	April 30, 2006	Kitt Peak	Spacewatch	·	620 m	MPC · JPL
620747	2006 HS_{127}	—	May 24, 2006	Kitt Peak	Spacewatch	·	2.8 km	MPC · JPL
620748	2006 HD_{143}	—	April 27, 2006	Cerro Tololo	Deep Ecliptic Survey	·	1.7 km	MPC · JPL
620749	2006 HN_{149}	—	April 27, 2006	Cerro Tololo	Deep Ecliptic Survey	·	1.0 km	MPC · JPL
620750	2006 HA_{156}	—	November 3, 2008	Mount Lemmon	Mount Lemmon Survey	·	2.8 km	MPC · JPL
620751	2006 HX_{156}	—	November 8, 2009	Mount Lemmon	Mount Lemmon Survey	EUP	2.5 km	MPC · JPL
620752	2006 JB_{63}	—	May 1, 2006	Kitt Peak	Deep Ecliptic Survey	·	940 m	MPC · JPL
620753	2006 JL_{66}	—	December 1, 2003	Kitt Peak	Spacewatch	THM	1.5 km	MPC · JPL
620754	2006 JO_{75}	—	May 1, 2006	Mauna Kea	P. A. Wiegert	·	390 m	MPC · JPL
620755	2006 JH_{82}	—	September 25, 2003	Palomar	NEAT	·	890 m	MPC · JPL
620756	2006 JF_{86}	—	June 21, 1998	Kitt Peak	Spacewatch	·	1.0 km	MPC · JPL
620757	2006 KM_{4}	—	May 19, 2006	Mount Lemmon	Mount Lemmon Survey	·	2.9 km	MPC · JPL
620758	2006 KW_{6}	—	May 19, 2006	Mount Lemmon	Mount Lemmon Survey	·	410 m	MPC · JPL
620759	2006 KF_{32}	—	May 1, 2006	Kitt Peak	Spacewatch	·	380 m	MPC · JPL
620760	2006 KQ_{35}	—	May 20, 2006	Kitt Peak	Spacewatch	·	980 m	MPC · JPL
620761	2006 KB_{56}	—	May 21, 2006	Kitt Peak	Spacewatch	·	1.6 km	MPC · JPL
620762	2006 KH_{61}	—	May 22, 2006	Kitt Peak	Spacewatch	·	670 m	MPC · JPL
620763	2006 KE_{72}	—	May 22, 2006	Kitt Peak	Spacewatch	T_{j} (2.99) · EUP	3.1 km	MPC · JPL
620764	2006 KT_{91}	—	April 30, 2006	Kitt Peak	Spacewatch	MIS	2.4 km	MPC · JPL
620765	2006 KZ_{95}	—	May 25, 2006	Kitt Peak	Spacewatch	·	2.9 km	MPC · JPL
620766	2006 KB_{103}	—	May 29, 2006	Kitt Peak	Spacewatch	·	2.2 km	MPC · JPL
620767	2006 KX_{109}	—	May 6, 2006	Mount Lemmon	Mount Lemmon Survey	·	1.0 km	MPC · JPL
620768	2006 KV_{128}	—	May 25, 2006	Mauna Kea	P. A. Wiegert	·	2.4 km	MPC · JPL
620769	2006 KO_{131}	—	May 25, 2006	Mauna Kea	P. A. Wiegert	·	2.3 km	MPC · JPL
620770	2006 KR_{133}	—	May 25, 2006	Mauna Kea	P. A. Wiegert	·	1.1 km	MPC · JPL
620771	2006 KG_{146}	—	May 30, 2006	Mount Lemmon	Mount Lemmon Survey	·	890 m	MPC · JPL
620772	2006 KN_{146}	—	May 24, 2006	Kitt Peak	Spacewatch	·	1.2 km	MPC · JPL
620773	2006 KD_{147}	—	June 7, 2013	Haleakala	Pan-STARRS 1	·	640 m	MPC · JPL
620774	2006 KN_{147}	—	November 1, 2007	Mount Lemmon	Mount Lemmon Survey	·	1.0 km	MPC · JPL
620775	2006 KH_{149}	—	September 29, 2008	Mount Lemmon	Mount Lemmon Survey	URS	2.5 km	MPC · JPL
620776	2006 KS_{149}	—	June 11, 2015	Haleakala	Pan-STARRS 2	·	1.4 km	MPC · JPL
620777	2006 KU_{149}	—	March 10, 2016	Haleakala	Pan-STARRS 1	·	2.4 km	MPC · JPL
620778	2006 KY_{149}	—	August 18, 2001	Palomar	NEAT	·	2.6 km	MPC · JPL
620779	2006 KU_{150}	—	November 19, 2008	Kitt Peak	Spacewatch	LUT	3.4 km	MPC · JPL
620780	2006 KS_{153}	—	April 5, 2010	Mount Lemmon	Mount Lemmon Survey	·	770 m	MPC · JPL
620781	2006 LK_{8}	—	February 4, 2009	Mount Lemmon	Mount Lemmon Survey	·	570 m	MPC · JPL
620782	2006 OQ_{38}	—	June 22, 2006	Kitt Peak	Spacewatch	·	600 m	MPC · JPL
620783	2006 OV_{38}	—	December 21, 2008	Mount Lemmon	Mount Lemmon Survey	·	1.5 km	MPC · JPL
620784	2006 PN	—	August 4, 2006	Pla D'Arguines	R. Ferrando, Ferrando, M.	JUN	960 m	MPC · JPL
620785	2006 PU_{20}	—	July 25, 2006	Palomar	NEAT	·	1.3 km	MPC · JPL
620786	2006 PJ_{30}	—	May 31, 2006	Mount Lemmon	Mount Lemmon Survey	·	610 m	MPC · JPL
620787	2006 QR	—	August 18, 2006	Reedy Creek	J. Broughton	·	750 m	MPC · JPL
620788	2006 QM_{5}	—	August 17, 2006	Palomar	NEAT	·	2.3 km	MPC · JPL
620789	2006 QT_{11}	—	August 16, 2006	Siding Spring	SSS	·	1.3 km	MPC · JPL
620790	2006 QA_{18}	—	August 16, 2006	Siding Spring	SSS	·	590 m	MPC · JPL
620791	2006 QU_{23}	—	August 21, 2006	Dax	C. Rinner, P. Dupouy	·	1.7 km	MPC · JPL
620792	2006 QS_{35}	—	August 17, 2006	Palomar	NEAT	·	1.4 km	MPC · JPL
620793	2006 QN_{36}	—	November 13, 2010	Kitt Peak	Spacewatch	·	730 m	MPC · JPL
620794	2006 QW_{37}	—	July 30, 2006	Siding Spring	SSS	·	1.3 km	MPC · JPL
620795	2006 QO_{39}	—	August 19, 2006	Anderson Mesa	LONEOS	·	1.3 km	MPC · JPL
620796	2006 QP_{40}	—	August 16, 2006	Lulin	LUSS	·	600 m	MPC · JPL
620797	2006 QV_{41}	—	July 18, 2006	Mount Lemmon	Mount Lemmon Survey	(895)	3.0 km	MPC · JPL
620798	2006 QS_{49}	—	August 22, 2006	Palomar	NEAT	·	1.2 km	MPC · JPL
620799	2006 QK_{52}	—	August 23, 2006	Palomar	NEAT	·	520 m	MPC · JPL
620800	2006 QO_{59}	—	August 19, 2006	Anderson Mesa	LONEOS	·	1.3 km	MPC · JPL

== 620801–620900 ==
back to top

Designation			Discovery			Properties		Ref
Permanent	Provisional	Named after	Date	Site	Discoverer(s)	Category	Diam.	Ref
620801	2006 QT_{69}	—	August 21, 2006	Kitt Peak	Spacewatch	·	1.4 km	MPC · JPL
620802	2006 QJ_{81}	—	August 24, 2006	Palomar	NEAT	·	2.1 km	MPC · JPL
620803	2006 QJ_{82}	—	August 25, 2006	Socorro	LINEAR	·	2.4 km	MPC · JPL
620804	2006 QL_{83}	—	August 27, 2006	Kitt Peak	Spacewatch	·	1.4 km	MPC · JPL
620805	2006 QU_{88}	—	August 27, 2006	Kitt Peak	Spacewatch	·	600 m	MPC · JPL
620806	2006 QG_{126}	—	August 28, 2006	Siding Spring	SSS	·	1.1 km	MPC · JPL
620807	2006 QB_{135}	—	August 29, 2006	Catalina	CSS	TIR	3.1 km	MPC · JPL
620808	2006 QC_{140}	—	July 25, 2006	Mount Lemmon	Mount Lemmon Survey	·	530 m	MPC · JPL
620809	2006 QJ_{146}	—	August 18, 2006	Kitt Peak	Spacewatch	·	1.1 km	MPC · JPL
620810	2006 QA_{147}	—	August 18, 2006	Kitt Peak	Spacewatch	AGN	840 m	MPC · JPL
620811	2006 QC_{154}	—	August 19, 2006	Kitt Peak	Spacewatch	·	600 m	MPC · JPL
620812	2006 QQ_{158}	—	August 19, 2006	Kitt Peak	Spacewatch	V	360 m	MPC · JPL
620813	2006 QD_{162}	—	August 20, 2006	Kitt Peak	Spacewatch	·	560 m	MPC · JPL
620814	2006 QN_{169}	—	August 27, 2006	Anderson Mesa	LONEOS	V	730 m	MPC · JPL
620815	2006 QS_{169}	—	August 28, 2006	Catalina	CSS	·	1.1 km	MPC · JPL
620816	2006 QC_{178}	—	August 27, 2006	Kitt Peak	Spacewatch	·	1.3 km	MPC · JPL
620817	2006 QR_{187}	—	August 29, 2006	Catalina	CSS	·	1.2 km	MPC · JPL
620818	2006 QA_{188}	—	August 21, 2006	Kitt Peak	Spacewatch	·	1.2 km	MPC · JPL
620819	2006 QH_{192}	—	August 21, 2006	Kitt Peak	Spacewatch	·	560 m	MPC · JPL
620820	2006 QP_{193}	—	August 19, 2006	Kitt Peak	Spacewatch	·	540 m	MPC · JPL
620821	2006 QM_{195}	—	August 27, 2006	Kitt Peak	Spacewatch	·	1.2 km	MPC · JPL
620822	2006 QF_{197}	—	May 25, 2014	Haleakala	Pan-STARRS 1	·	1.7 km	MPC · JPL
620823	2006 QN_{197}	—	November 10, 2016	Haleakala	Pan-STARRS 1	HNS	970 m	MPC · JPL
620824	2006 QG_{199}	—	February 2, 2008	Mount Lemmon	Mount Lemmon Survey	·	1.3 km	MPC · JPL
620825	2006 QX_{200}	—	September 5, 2010	Mount Lemmon	Mount Lemmon Survey	V	470 m	MPC · JPL
620826	2006 QJ_{202}	—	August 18, 2006	Kitt Peak	Spacewatch	·	1.3 km	MPC · JPL
620827	2006 QZ_{203}	—	August 27, 2006	Kitt Peak	Spacewatch	AGN	880 m	MPC · JPL
620828	2006 QN_{204}	—	August 18, 2006	Kitt Peak	Spacewatch	·	490 m	MPC · JPL
620829	2006 QE_{205}	—	August 18, 2006	Kitt Peak	Spacewatch	·	530 m	MPC · JPL
620830	2006 RU_{3}	—	August 20, 2006	Kitt Peak	Spacewatch	·	540 m	MPC · JPL
620831	2006 RR_{6}	—	August 29, 2006	Anderson Mesa	LONEOS	·	1.8 km	MPC · JPL
620832	2006 RQ_{23}	—	August 29, 2006	Catalina	CSS	JUN	750 m	MPC · JPL
620833	2006 RM_{28}	—	September 15, 2006	Kitt Peak	Spacewatch	·	520 m	MPC · JPL
620834	2006 RR_{39}	—	September 12, 2006	Catalina	CSS	·	1.4 km	MPC · JPL
620835	2006 RF_{51}	—	September 14, 2006	Kitt Peak	Spacewatch	·	1.2 km	MPC · JPL
620836	2006 RJ_{66}	—	August 28, 2006	Catalina	CSS	·	1.4 km	MPC · JPL
620837	2006 RN_{71}	—	September 15, 2006	Kitt Peak	Spacewatch	·	1.2 km	MPC · JPL
620838	2006 RV_{71}	—	September 15, 2006	Kitt Peak	Spacewatch	·	1.1 km	MPC · JPL
620839	2006 RX_{86}	—	September 15, 2006	Kitt Peak	Spacewatch	·	1.2 km	MPC · JPL
620840	2006 RK_{96}	—	September 15, 2006	Kitt Peak	Spacewatch	·	1.2 km	MPC · JPL
620841	2006 SA_{1}	—	September 16, 2006	Kitt Peak	Spacewatch	·	1.2 km	MPC · JPL
620842	2006 SL_{4}	—	September 16, 2006	Catalina	CSS	·	580 m	MPC · JPL
620843	2006 SQ_{5}	—	September 16, 2006	Palomar	NEAT	·	1.5 km	MPC · JPL
620844	2006 SA_{7}	—	September 17, 2006	Kitt Peak	Spacewatch	AMO	460 m	MPC · JPL
620845	2006 SD_{9}	—	September 18, 2006	Anderson Mesa	LONEOS	·	1.3 km	MPC · JPL
620846	2006 SA_{10}	—	September 16, 2006	Kitt Peak	Spacewatch	·	1.4 km	MPC · JPL
620847	2006 SO_{17}	—	September 17, 2006	Kitt Peak	Spacewatch	·	610 m	MPC · JPL
620848	2006 SA_{31}	—	August 19, 2006	Kitt Peak	Spacewatch	·	1.4 km	MPC · JPL
620849	2006 SF_{31}	—	September 17, 2006	Kitt Peak	Spacewatch	V	440 m	MPC · JPL
620850	2006 SJ_{47}	—	September 19, 2006	Catalina	CSS	·	1.4 km	MPC · JPL
620851	2006 SW_{47}	—	July 21, 2006	Mount Lemmon	Mount Lemmon Survey	·	650 m	MPC · JPL
620852	2006 SP_{53}	—	September 16, 2006	Catalina	CSS	·	1.6 km	MPC · JPL
620853	2006 SJ_{72}	—	September 19, 2006	Kitt Peak	Spacewatch	NYS	730 m	MPC · JPL
620854	2006 SZ_{81}	—	September 14, 2006	Catalina	CSS	·	750 m	MPC · JPL
620855	2006 SU_{87}	—	September 18, 2006	Kitt Peak	Spacewatch	·	1.5 km	MPC · JPL
620856	2006 SF_{88}	—	September 18, 2006	Kitt Peak	Spacewatch	·	620 m	MPC · JPL
620857	2006 SG_{91}	—	September 18, 2006	Kitt Peak	Spacewatch	·	1.2 km	MPC · JPL
620858	2006 SY_{91}	—	September 18, 2006	Kitt Peak	Spacewatch	NYS	750 m	MPC · JPL
620859	2006 SX_{110}	—	September 20, 2006	Haleakala	NEAT	·	1.9 km	MPC · JPL
620860	2006 SP_{124}	—	September 19, 2006	Catalina	CSS	(1547)	1.2 km	MPC · JPL
620861	2006 SW_{134}	—	August 13, 2006	Palomar	NEAT	EUN	1.7 km	MPC · JPL
620862	2006 SV_{148}	—	September 19, 2006	Kitt Peak	Spacewatch	JUN	720 m	MPC · JPL
620863	2006 SZ_{162}	—	September 24, 2006	Kitt Peak	Spacewatch	·	1.4 km	MPC · JPL
620864	2006 SB_{171}	—	September 17, 2006	Kitt Peak	Spacewatch	·	440 m	MPC · JPL
620865	2006 SS_{203}	—	September 25, 2006	Kitt Peak	Spacewatch	·	1.4 km	MPC · JPL
620866	2006 SU_{203}	—	September 18, 2006	Kitt Peak	Spacewatch	·	510 m	MPC · JPL
620867	2006 SV_{225}	—	September 26, 2006	Kitt Peak	Spacewatch	·	1.5 km	MPC · JPL
620868	2006 SR_{251}	—	September 19, 2006	Kitt Peak	Spacewatch	·	1.2 km	MPC · JPL
620869	2006 SF_{260}	—	September 26, 2006	Kitt Peak	Spacewatch	·	540 m	MPC · JPL
620870	2006 SZ_{294}	—	September 17, 2006	Kitt Peak	Spacewatch	·	1.2 km	MPC · JPL
620871	2006 SA_{296}	—	September 17, 2006	Catalina	CSS	·	620 m	MPC · JPL
620872	2006 SJ_{306}	—	September 27, 2006	Mount Lemmon	Mount Lemmon Survey	·	580 m	MPC · JPL
620873	2006 SV_{310}	—	September 27, 2006	Kitt Peak	Spacewatch	·	1.3 km	MPC · JPL
620874	2006 SU_{317}	—	September 17, 2006	Kitt Peak	Spacewatch	MRX	740 m	MPC · JPL
620875	2006 SV_{324}	—	September 17, 2006	Kitt Peak	Spacewatch	·	1.2 km	MPC · JPL
620876	2006 SA_{340}	—	September 28, 2006	Kitt Peak	Spacewatch	·	620 m	MPC · JPL
620877	2006 SY_{341}	—	September 28, 2006	Kitt Peak	Spacewatch	·	1.3 km	MPC · JPL
620878	2006 SF_{349}	—	August 29, 2006	Anderson Mesa	LONEOS	·	1.1 km	MPC · JPL
620879	2006 SY_{354}	—	September 30, 2006	Mount Lemmon	Mount Lemmon Survey	·	890 m	MPC · JPL
620880	2006 SX_{373}	—	September 30, 2006	Catalina	CSS	·	570 m	MPC · JPL
620881	2006 SS_{382}	—	September 28, 2006	Apache Point	SDSS Collaboration	·	1.3 km	MPC · JPL
620882	2006 SC_{388}	—	September 30, 2006	Apache Point	SDSS Collaboration	·	830 m	MPC · JPL
620883	2006 SF_{398}	—	September 30, 2006	Mount Lemmon	Mount Lemmon Survey	·	1.4 km	MPC · JPL
620884	2006 SM_{400}	—	September 20, 2006	Palomar	NEAT	·	1.9 km	MPC · JPL
620885	2006 SA_{406}	—	September 18, 2006	Kitt Peak	Spacewatch	·	1.2 km	MPC · JPL
620886	2006 SQ_{413}	—	September 25, 2006	Mount Lemmon	Mount Lemmon Survey	·	870 m	MPC · JPL
620887	2006 SQ_{423}	—	September 27, 2006	Catalina	CSS	·	1.5 km	MPC · JPL
620888	2006 SA_{424}	—	September 28, 2006	Mount Lemmon	Mount Lemmon Survey	·	760 m	MPC · JPL
620889	2006 ST_{425}	—	September 23, 2006	Kitt Peak	Spacewatch	·	570 m	MPC · JPL
620890	2006 SL_{428}	—	August 8, 2013	Kitt Peak	Spacewatch	·	630 m	MPC · JPL
620891	2006 SH_{440}	—	January 13, 2008	Kitt Peak	Spacewatch	·	1.2 km	MPC · JPL
620892	2006 SW_{440}	—	August 29, 2006	Anderson Mesa	LONEOS	·	900 m	MPC · JPL
620893	2006 SC_{441}	—	January 27, 2017	Haleakala	Pan-STARRS 1	·	1.4 km	MPC · JPL
620894	2006 SE_{445}	—	September 19, 2006	Kitt Peak	Spacewatch	·	500 m	MPC · JPL
620895	2006 SC_{449}	—	September 26, 2006	Mount Lemmon	Mount Lemmon Survey	·	660 m	MPC · JPL
620896	2006 TL_{17}	—	September 30, 2006	Mount Lemmon	Mount Lemmon Survey	·	1.2 km	MPC · JPL
620897	2006 TF_{35}	—	September 27, 2006	Mount Lemmon	Mount Lemmon Survey	·	800 m	MPC · JPL
620898	2006 TF_{36}	—	September 22, 2006	Anderson Mesa	LONEOS	·	1.6 km	MPC · JPL
620899	2006 TX_{41}	—	October 12, 2006	Kitt Peak	Spacewatch	·	840 m	MPC · JPL
620900	2006 TG_{48}	—	August 17, 2001	Palomar	NEAT	·	1.5 km	MPC · JPL

== 620901–621000 ==
back to top

Designation			Discovery			Properties		Ref
Permanent	Provisional	Named after	Date	Site	Discoverer(s)	Category	Diam.	Ref
620901	2006 TS_{50}	—	September 30, 2006	Mount Lemmon	Mount Lemmon Survey	·	850 m	MPC · JPL
620902	2006 TB_{64}	—	July 21, 2006	Mount Lemmon	Mount Lemmon Survey	·	760 m	MPC · JPL
620903	2006 TE_{68}	—	September 30, 2006	Catalina	CSS	·	1.8 km	MPC · JPL
620904	2006 TH_{69}	—	October 2, 2006	Catalina	CSS	·	1.3 km	MPC · JPL
620905	2006 TQ_{96}	—	October 12, 2006	Palomar	NEAT	·	1.7 km	MPC · JPL
620906	2006 TQ_{110}	—	September 26, 2006	Kitt Peak	Spacewatch	·	1.5 km	MPC · JPL
620907	2006 TH_{119}	—	October 11, 2006	Apache Point	SDSS Collaboration	·	3.0 km	MPC · JPL
620908	2006 TR_{119}	—	September 18, 2006	Catalina	CSS	·	1.2 km	MPC · JPL
620909	2006 TW_{119}	—	October 11, 2006	Apache Point	SDSS Collaboration	·	1.3 km	MPC · JPL
620910	2006 TT_{126}	—	October 2, 2006	Mount Lemmon	Mount Lemmon Survey	·	1.3 km	MPC · JPL
620911	2006 TY_{131}	—	October 2, 2006	Mount Lemmon	Mount Lemmon Survey	·	800 m	MPC · JPL
620912	2006 TG_{132}	—	October 2, 2006	Mount Lemmon	Mount Lemmon Survey	·	1.1 km	MPC · JPL
620913	2006 TM_{134}	—	March 13, 2012	Mount Lemmon	Mount Lemmon Survey	·	770 m	MPC · JPL
620914	2006 TZ_{134}	—	October 4, 2006	Mount Lemmon	Mount Lemmon Survey	·	2.2 km	MPC · JPL
620915	2006 TG_{135}	—	October 11, 2006	Palomar	NEAT	·	470 m	MPC · JPL
620916	2006 TM_{136}	—	August 13, 2006	Palomar	NEAT	·	1.3 km	MPC · JPL
620917	2006 TZ_{138}	—	October 2, 2006	Catalina	CSS	(1338) (FLO)	500 m	MPC · JPL
620918	2006 TH_{143}	—	October 2, 2006	Mount Lemmon	Mount Lemmon Survey	·	2.6 km	MPC · JPL
620919	2006 TM_{145}	—	October 2, 2006	Mount Lemmon	Mount Lemmon Survey	·	1.6 km	MPC · JPL
620920	2006 US_{20}	—	September 25, 2006	Kitt Peak	Spacewatch	·	1.3 km	MPC · JPL
620921	2006 UA_{24}	—	October 16, 2006	Kitt Peak	Spacewatch	·	820 m	MPC · JPL
620922	2006 UO_{92}	—	October 18, 2006	Kitt Peak	Spacewatch	·	580 m	MPC · JPL
620923	2006 UF_{111}	—	September 21, 2006	Anderson Mesa	LONEOS	·	1.3 km	MPC · JPL
620924	2006 UJ_{117}	—	September 25, 2006	Mount Lemmon	Mount Lemmon Survey	·	1.4 km	MPC · JPL
620925	2006 UQ_{130}	—	September 27, 2006	Mount Lemmon	Mount Lemmon Survey	·	560 m	MPC · JPL
620926	2006 UO_{135}	—	October 19, 2006	Kitt Peak	Spacewatch	AGN	1 km	MPC · JPL
620927	2006 UN_{182}	—	September 30, 2006	Catalina	CSS	·	1.2 km	MPC · JPL
620928	2006 UA_{204}	—	October 2, 2006	Mount Lemmon	Mount Lemmon Survey	·	1.3 km	MPC · JPL
620929	2006 UD_{208}	—	October 23, 2006	Kitt Peak	Spacewatch	·	870 m	MPC · JPL
620930	2006 UT_{211}	—	October 23, 2006	Kitt Peak	Spacewatch	·	1.2 km	MPC · JPL
620931	2006 UV_{231}	—	October 21, 2006	Kitt Peak	Spacewatch	H	410 m	MPC · JPL
620932	2006 UW_{240}	—	October 23, 2006	Mount Lemmon	Mount Lemmon Survey	JUN	980 m	MPC · JPL
620933	2006 UH_{243}	—	September 25, 2006	Kitt Peak	Spacewatch	·	1.3 km	MPC · JPL
620934	2006 UM_{243}	—	September 25, 2006	Mount Lemmon	Mount Lemmon Survey	·	500 m	MPC · JPL
620935	2006 UB_{244}	—	September 24, 2006	Kitt Peak	Spacewatch	·	670 m	MPC · JPL
620936	2006 UA_{245}	—	October 2, 2006	Mount Lemmon	Mount Lemmon Survey	·	690 m	MPC · JPL
620937	2006 UY_{245}	—	October 27, 2006	Mount Lemmon	Mount Lemmon Survey	AEO	760 m	MPC · JPL
620938	2006 UA_{247}	—	September 26, 2006	Mount Lemmon	Mount Lemmon Survey	·	1.2 km	MPC · JPL
620939	2006 UJ_{256}	—	October 13, 2006	Lulin	LUSS	·	660 m	MPC · JPL
620940	2006 UB_{298}	—	October 19, 2006	Kitt Peak	Deep Ecliptic Survey	AST	1.4 km	MPC · JPL
620941	2006 UT_{305}	—	October 19, 2006	Kitt Peak	Deep Ecliptic Survey	·	1.4 km	MPC · JPL
620942	2006 UP_{346}	—	October 22, 2006	Kitt Peak	Spacewatch	·	540 m	MPC · JPL
620943	2006 UF_{365}	—	October 23, 2006	Mount Lemmon	Mount Lemmon Survey	·	1.5 km	MPC · JPL
620944	2006 UQ_{365}	—	October 28, 2006	Mount Lemmon	Mount Lemmon Survey	·	1.7 km	MPC · JPL
620945	2006 UR_{383}	—	October 22, 2006	Kitt Peak	Spacewatch	·	650 m	MPC · JPL
620946	2006 UW_{383}	—	October 16, 2006	Kitt Peak	Spacewatch	·	620 m	MPC · JPL
620947	2006 VK_{11}	—	October 13, 2006	Kitt Peak	Spacewatch	AEO	950 m	MPC · JPL
620948	2006 VL_{14}	—	November 13, 2006	Socorro	LINEAR	PHO	1.1 km	MPC · JPL
620949	2006 VU_{40}	—	November 12, 2006	Mount Lemmon	Mount Lemmon Survey	KOR	1.1 km	MPC · JPL
620950	2006 VA_{57}	—	October 21, 2006	Mount Lemmon	Mount Lemmon Survey	·	1.1 km	MPC · JPL
620951	2006 VH_{57}	—	November 11, 2006	Kitt Peak	Spacewatch	JUN	970 m	MPC · JPL
620952	2006 VK_{114}	—	November 1, 2006	Mount Lemmon	Mount Lemmon Survey	·	580 m	MPC · JPL
620953	2006 VY_{115}	—	November 14, 2006	Kitt Peak	Spacewatch	GEF	840 m	MPC · JPL
620954	2006 VQ_{146}	—	November 15, 2006	Catalina	CSS	·	740 m	MPC · JPL
620955	2006 VM_{179}	—	August 13, 2010	Kitt Peak	Spacewatch	·	1.1 km	MPC · JPL
620956	2006 WF_{13}	—	November 16, 2006	Mount Lemmon	Mount Lemmon Survey	NYS	700 m	MPC · JPL
620957	2006 WZ_{15}	—	October 23, 2006	Kitt Peak	Spacewatch	MRX	900 m	MPC · JPL
620958	2006 WR_{22}	—	July 30, 2005	Palomar	NEAT	·	2.1 km	MPC · JPL
620959	2006 WN_{26}	—	October 27, 2006	Catalina	CSS	·	970 m	MPC · JPL
620960	2006 WA_{37}	—	November 16, 2006	Kitt Peak	Spacewatch	HOF	2.0 km	MPC · JPL
620961	2006 WB_{65}	—	November 17, 2006	Mount Lemmon	Mount Lemmon Survey	·	930 m	MPC · JPL
620962	2006 WT_{78}	—	November 1, 2006	Mount Lemmon	Mount Lemmon Survey	·	730 m	MPC · JPL
620963	2006 WU_{78}	—	October 19, 2006	Mount Lemmon	Mount Lemmon Survey	EUN	990 m	MPC · JPL
620964	2006 WX_{80}	—	September 27, 2006	Mount Lemmon	Mount Lemmon Survey	NYS	670 m	MPC · JPL
620965	2006 WF_{105}	—	November 19, 2006	Kitt Peak	Spacewatch	·	1.4 km	MPC · JPL
620966	2006 WW_{133}	—	October 2, 2006	Mount Lemmon	Mount Lemmon Survey	·	1.4 km	MPC · JPL
620967	2006 WA_{134}	—	November 18, 2006	Mount Lemmon	Mount Lemmon Survey	·	1.6 km	MPC · JPL
620968	2006 WB_{143}	—	November 20, 2006	Kitt Peak	Spacewatch	NEM	1.6 km	MPC · JPL
620969	2006 WP_{171}	—	October 20, 2006	Mount Lemmon	Mount Lemmon Survey	(1547)	1.1 km	MPC · JPL
620970	2006 WX_{172}	—	November 23, 2006	Kitt Peak	Spacewatch	·	670 m	MPC · JPL
620971	2006 WQ_{187}	—	November 16, 2006	Kitt Peak	Spacewatch	·	640 m	MPC · JPL
620972	2006 WD_{203}	—	November 16, 2006	Kitt Peak	Spacewatch	PHO	760 m	MPC · JPL
620973	2006 WX_{233}	—	November 17, 2006	Kitt Peak	Spacewatch	·	730 m	MPC · JPL
620974	2006 XB_{7}	—	November 25, 2006	Kitt Peak	Spacewatch	·	2.0 km	MPC · JPL
620975	2006 XE_{24}	—	November 22, 2006	Mount Lemmon	Mount Lemmon Survey	·	1.5 km	MPC · JPL
620976	2006 YU_{58}	—	February 25, 2011	Mount Lemmon	Mount Lemmon Survey	NYS	710 m	MPC · JPL
620977	2006 YE_{63}	—	August 7, 2016	Haleakala	Pan-STARRS 1	·	610 m	MPC · JPL
620978	2006 YF_{63}	—	December 21, 2006	Kitt Peak	L. H. Wasserman, M. W. Buie	·	730 m	MPC · JPL
620979	2006 YV_{64}	—	August 2, 2016	Haleakala	Pan-STARRS 1	·	820 m	MPC · JPL
620980	2007 BK_{35}	—	January 24, 2007	Mount Lemmon	Mount Lemmon Survey	PHO	680 m	MPC · JPL
620981	2007 BM_{36}	—	October 4, 2005	Palomar	NEAT	·	2.5 km	MPC · JPL
620982	2007 BP_{42}	—	December 20, 2006	Mount Lemmon	Mount Lemmon Survey	·	1.8 km	MPC · JPL
620983	2007 BM_{106}	—	December 4, 2013	Haleakala	Pan-STARRS 1	·	870 m	MPC · JPL
620984	2007 BH_{109}	—	February 10, 2011	Mount Lemmon	Mount Lemmon Survey	·	840 m	MPC · JPL
620985	2007 BF_{116}	—	January 17, 2007	Kitt Peak	Spacewatch	·	1.0 km	MPC · JPL
620986	2007 BA_{117}	—	January 17, 2007	Kitt Peak	Spacewatch	·	1.5 km	MPC · JPL
620987	2007 BP_{118}	—	January 24, 2007	Mount Lemmon	Mount Lemmon Survey	·	790 m	MPC · JPL
620988	2007 CO_{68}	—	February 14, 2007	Mauna Kea	P. A. Wiegert	·	780 m	MPC · JPL
620989	2007 DW_{124}	—	February 25, 2007	Mount Lemmon	Mount Lemmon Survey	·	1.6 km	MPC · JPL
620990	2007 DZ_{125}	—	October 5, 2016	Mount Lemmon	Mount Lemmon Survey	·	890 m	MPC · JPL
620991	2007 DL_{126}	—	February 21, 2007	Mount Lemmon	Mount Lemmon Survey	L5	8.9 km	MPC · JPL
620992	2007 EC_{139}	—	March 12, 2007	Kitt Peak	Spacewatch	·	900 m	MPC · JPL
620993	2007 ES_{234}	—	August 13, 2012	Haleakala	Pan-STARRS 1	·	1.1 km	MPC · JPL
620994	2007 FH_{61}	—	March 19, 2007	Mount Lemmon	Mount Lemmon Survey	L5	8.5 km	MPC · JPL
620995	2007 GS_{78}	—	November 19, 2003	Palomar	NEAT	T_{j} (2.98) · EUP	3.0 km	MPC · JPL
620996	2007 GA_{81}	—	April 14, 2007	Kitt Peak	Spacewatch	·	1.8 km	MPC · JPL
620997	2007 HY_{22}	—	September 23, 2004	Kitt Peak	Spacewatch	·	750 m	MPC · JPL
620998	2007 HU_{24}	—	April 18, 2007	Kitt Peak	Spacewatch	·	470 m	MPC · JPL
620999	2007 HJ_{38}	—	April 20, 2007	Kitt Peak	Spacewatch	·	1.1 km	MPC · JPL
621000	2007 HB_{100}	—	April 22, 2007	Mount Lemmon	Mount Lemmon Survey	·	2.2 km	MPC · JPL

back to top

== Meaning of names ==
As minor planet discoveries are confirmed, they are given a permanent number by the IAU's Minor Planet Center (MPC), and the discoverers can then submit names for them, following the IAU's naming conventions. The list below concerns those minor planets in the specified number-range that have received names, and explains the meanings of those names.

Official naming citations of newly named small Solar System bodies are approved and published in a bulletin by IAU's Working Group for Small Bodies Nomenclature (WGSBN). Before May 2021, citations were published in MPC's Minor Planet Circulars for many decades. Recent citations can also be found on the JPL Small-Body Database (SBDB). Until his death in 2016, German astronomer Lutz D. Schmadel compiled these citations into the Dictionary of Minor Planet Names (DMP) and regularly updated the collection.

Based on Paul Herget's The Names of the Minor Planets, Schmadel also researched the unclear origin of numerous asteroids, most of which had been named prior to World War II. This article incorporates text from this source, which is in the public domain: SBDB New namings may only be added to this list below after official publication as the preannouncement of names is condemned. The WGSBN publishes a comprehensive guideline for the naming rules of non-cometary small Solar System bodies.

Named minor planet	Provisional	This minor planet was named for...	Ref · Catalog
620096 Curupira	2016 HL	Curupira is a Brazilian indigenous folklore legendary creature, whose main purpose is to protect the forest against hunters and poachers.	IAU · 620096
620307 Casanovas	2002 QL_{149}	Juan Casanovas (1929–2013), a Jesuit solar astronomer.	IAU · 620307
