= List of minor planets: 705001–706000 =

The following is a partial list of minor planets, running from minor-planet number 705001 through 706000, inclusive. The primary data for this and other partial lists is based on JPL's "Small-Body Orbital Elements" and data available from the Minor Planet Center. Critical list information is also provided by the MPC, unless otherwise specified from Lowell Observatory. A detailed description of the table's columns and additional sources are given on the main page including a complete list of every page in this series, and a statistical break-up on the dynamical classification of minor planets.

Also see the summary list of all named bodies in numerical and alphabetical order, and the corresponding naming citations for the number range of this particular list. New namings may only be added to this list after official publication, as the preannouncement of names is condemned by the Working Group for Small Bodies Nomenclature of the International Astronomical Union.

| Near-Earth obj. | MBA (inner) | MBA (outer) | Centaur |
| Mars-crosser | MBA (middle) | Jupiter trojan | Trans-Neptunian obj. |
| Unclassified |

== 705001–705100 ==
| Designation | | | Discovery | | | Properties | | Ref |
| Permanent | Provisional | Named after | Date | Site | Discoverer(s) | Category | Diam. | Ref |
|---|---|---|---|---|---|---|---|---|
| 705001 | 2008 UA_{319} | — | October 31, 2008 | Mount Lemmon | Mount Lemmon Survey | · | 1.3 km | MPC · JPL |
| 705002 | 2008 UC_{319} | — | October 10, 2008 | Mount Lemmon | Mount Lemmon Survey | · | 2.5 km | MPC · JPL |
| 705003 | 2008 UW_{319} | — | October 31, 2008 | Mount Lemmon | Mount Lemmon Survey | · | 1.1 km | MPC · JPL |
| 705004 | 2008 UZ_{319} | — | October 31, 2008 | Mount Lemmon | Mount Lemmon Survey | · | 2.7 km | MPC · JPL |
| 705005 | 2008 UH_{320} | — | October 31, 2008 | Mount Lemmon | Mount Lemmon Survey | · | 2.3 km | MPC · JPL |
| 705006 | 2008 UX_{322} | — | September 28, 2008 | Mount Lemmon | Mount Lemmon Survey | · | 2.1 km | MPC · JPL |
| 705007 | 2008 UZ_{324} | — | September 5, 2008 | Kitt Peak | Spacewatch | · | 1.7 km | MPC · JPL |
| 705008 | 2008 UL_{325} | — | October 31, 2008 | Kitt Peak | Spacewatch | · | 1.1 km | MPC · JPL |
| 705009 | 2008 UB_{327} | — | October 31, 2008 | Kitt Peak | Spacewatch | · | 1.2 km | MPC · JPL |
| 705010 | 2008 UG_{327} | — | October 27, 2008 | Siding Spring | SSS | · | 3.6 km | MPC · JPL |
| 705011 | 2008 UU_{328} | — | October 22, 2008 | Kitt Peak | Spacewatch | · | 2.7 km | MPC · JPL |
| 705012 | 2008 UN_{331} | — | October 29, 1999 | Kitt Peak | Spacewatch | · | 1.6 km | MPC · JPL |
| 705013 | 2008 UZ_{338} | — | October 22, 2008 | Kitt Peak | Spacewatch | · | 2.5 km | MPC · JPL |
| 705014 | 2008 UT_{345} | — | October 26, 2008 | Kitt Peak | Spacewatch | (5) | 900 m | MPC · JPL |
| 705015 | 2008 US_{348} | — | October 25, 2008 | Catalina | CSS | · | 3.0 km | MPC · JPL |
| 705016 | 2008 UT_{348} | — | October 25, 2008 | Kitt Peak | Spacewatch | EUN | 1.2 km | MPC · JPL |
| 705017 | 2008 UR_{349} | — | October 28, 2008 | Kitt Peak | Spacewatch | · | 920 m | MPC · JPL |
| 705018 | 2008 UU_{349} | — | October 28, 2008 | Mount Lemmon | Mount Lemmon Survey | · | 580 m | MPC · JPL |
| 705019 | 2008 UR_{350} | — | October 27, 2008 | Kitt Peak | Spacewatch | · | 2.9 km | MPC · JPL |
| 705020 | 2008 UB_{351} | — | October 26, 2008 | Kitt Peak | Spacewatch | · | 1.9 km | MPC · JPL |
| 705021 | 2008 UH_{359} | — | October 27, 2008 | Mount Lemmon | Mount Lemmon Survey | · | 3.0 km | MPC · JPL |
| 705022 | 2008 UH_{363} | — | October 26, 2008 | Catalina | CSS | · | 2.8 km | MPC · JPL |
| 705023 | 2008 UK_{366} | — | October 20, 2008 | Mount Lemmon | Mount Lemmon Survey | · | 1.1 km | MPC · JPL |
| 705024 | 2008 UG_{367} | — | September 22, 2008 | Mount Lemmon | Mount Lemmon Survey | · | 2.4 km | MPC · JPL |
| 705025 | 2008 UM_{369} | — | October 28, 2008 | Kitt Peak | Spacewatch | · | 3.0 km | MPC · JPL |
| 705026 | 2008 UL_{371} | — | October 29, 2008 | Kitt Peak | Spacewatch | · | 2.7 km | MPC · JPL |
| 705027 | 2008 UY_{373} | — | October 30, 2008 | Kitt Peak | Spacewatch | · | 2.5 km | MPC · JPL |
| 705028 | 2008 UZ_{374} | — | October 25, 2008 | Kitt Peak | Spacewatch | VER | 2.1 km | MPC · JPL |
| 705029 | 2008 UR_{375} | — | October 24, 2008 | Catalina | CSS | · | 1.1 km | MPC · JPL |
| 705030 | 2008 UJ_{376} | — | October 21, 2008 | Kitt Peak | Spacewatch | · | 3.8 km | MPC · JPL |
| 705031 | 2008 UP_{376} | — | February 16, 2010 | Mount Lemmon | Mount Lemmon Survey | · | 1.5 km | MPC · JPL |
| 705032 | 2008 UY_{376} | — | January 28, 2014 | Mount Lemmon | Mount Lemmon Survey | · | 1.1 km | MPC · JPL |
| 705033 | 2008 UK_{377} | — | October 7, 2012 | Haleakala | Pan-STARRS 1 | · | 1.0 km | MPC · JPL |
| 705034 | 2008 UM_{377} | — | October 27, 2008 | Kitt Peak | Spacewatch | · | 2.5 km | MPC · JPL |
| 705035 | 2008 UA_{378} | — | October 26, 2008 | Kitt Peak | Spacewatch | · | 600 m | MPC · JPL |
| 705036 | 2008 UO_{378} | — | November 27, 2013 | Haleakala | Pan-STARRS 1 | · | 1.4 km | MPC · JPL |
| 705037 | 2008 UR_{378} | — | February 10, 2014 | Mount Lemmon | Mount Lemmon Survey | · | 1.1 km | MPC · JPL |
| 705038 | 2008 UE_{379} | — | March 28, 2011 | Mount Lemmon | Mount Lemmon Survey | · | 3.0 km | MPC · JPL |
| 705039 | 2008 UG_{379} | — | October 21, 2008 | Kitt Peak | Spacewatch | · | 2.9 km | MPC · JPL |
| 705040 | 2008 UJ_{379} | — | September 25, 2012 | Mount Lemmon | Mount Lemmon Survey | · | 1.1 km | MPC · JPL |
| 705041 | 2008 UM_{379} | — | April 2, 2011 | Kitt Peak | Spacewatch | · | 1.6 km | MPC · JPL |
| 705042 | 2008 UX_{379} | — | October 26, 2014 | Mount Lemmon | Mount Lemmon Survey | · | 2.8 km | MPC · JPL |
| 705043 | 2008 UY_{379} | — | June 8, 2016 | Haleakala | Pan-STARRS 1 | AGN | 940 m | MPC · JPL |
| 705044 | 2008 UC_{380} | — | May 20, 2012 | Mount Lemmon | Mount Lemmon Survey | · | 2.2 km | MPC · JPL |
| 705045 | 2008 UM_{381} | — | August 31, 2014 | Haleakala | Pan-STARRS 1 | · | 2.7 km | MPC · JPL |
| 705046 | 2008 UP_{381} | — | October 23, 2008 | Kitt Peak | Spacewatch | ELF | 2.9 km | MPC · JPL |
| 705047 | 2008 UY_{381} | — | March 28, 2011 | Mount Lemmon | Mount Lemmon Survey | · | 910 m | MPC · JPL |
| 705048 | 2008 UP_{382} | — | November 27, 2014 | Haleakala | Pan-STARRS 1 | VER | 2.7 km | MPC · JPL |
| 705049 | 2008 UE_{383} | — | October 23, 2008 | Kitt Peak | Spacewatch | MIS | 1.8 km | MPC · JPL |
| 705050 | 2008 UP_{383} | — | April 29, 2012 | Kitt Peak | Spacewatch | · | 2.7 km | MPC · JPL |
| 705051 | 2008 US_{383} | — | May 18, 2015 | Haleakala | Pan-STARRS 1 | · | 1.8 km | MPC · JPL |
| 705052 | 2008 UZ_{383} | — | September 19, 1995 | Kitt Peak | Spacewatch | · | 1.4 km | MPC · JPL |
| 705053 | 2008 UL_{384} | — | November 18, 2003 | Kitt Peak | Spacewatch | · | 2.5 km | MPC · JPL |
| 705054 | 2008 UC_{385} | — | March 30, 2011 | Haleakala | Pan-STARRS 1 | URS | 2.4 km | MPC · JPL |
| 705055 | 2008 UR_{385} | — | August 26, 2012 | Haleakala | Pan-STARRS 1 | KON | 1.5 km | MPC · JPL |
| 705056 | 2008 UW_{386} | — | July 2, 2011 | Kitt Peak | Spacewatch | · | 1.6 km | MPC · JPL |
| 705057 | 2008 UZ_{386} | — | August 14, 2013 | Haleakala | Pan-STARRS 1 | · | 2.5 km | MPC · JPL |
| 705058 | 2008 UC_{387} | — | October 28, 2008 | Kitt Peak | Spacewatch | · | 2.6 km | MPC · JPL |
| 705059 | 2008 UD_{387} | — | October 30, 2008 | Kitt Peak | Spacewatch | · | 2.7 km | MPC · JPL |
| 705060 | 2008 UF_{387} | — | October 20, 2008 | Mount Lemmon | Mount Lemmon Survey | · | 2.4 km | MPC · JPL |
| 705061 | 2008 UG_{387} | — | March 10, 2011 | Kitt Peak | Spacewatch | · | 2.2 km | MPC · JPL |
| 705062 | 2008 UH_{387} | — | October 29, 2008 | Kitt Peak | Spacewatch | · | 2.7 km | MPC · JPL |
| 705063 | 2008 UU_{387} | — | October 26, 2008 | Kitt Peak | Spacewatch | · | 2.8 km | MPC · JPL |
| 705064 | 2008 UY_{387} | — | December 11, 2014 | Mount Lemmon | Mount Lemmon Survey | · | 2.7 km | MPC · JPL |
| 705065 | 2008 UZ_{387} | — | October 29, 2008 | Kitt Peak | Spacewatch | · | 3.0 km | MPC · JPL |
| 705066 | 2008 UD_{388} | — | November 24, 2003 | Kitt Peak | Spacewatch | · | 2.5 km | MPC · JPL |
| 705067 | 2008 UQ_{388} | — | October 28, 2014 | Haleakala | Pan-STARRS 1 | · | 2.2 km | MPC · JPL |
| 705068 | 2008 UU_{388} | — | September 30, 2011 | Kitt Peak | Spacewatch | · | 780 m | MPC · JPL |
| 705069 | 2008 UV_{388} | — | September 12, 2016 | Haleakala | Pan-STARRS 1 | KON | 1.8 km | MPC · JPL |
| 705070 | 2008 UX_{388} | — | February 7, 2011 | Mount Lemmon | Mount Lemmon Survey | · | 2.1 km | MPC · JPL |
| 705071 | 2008 UM_{389} | — | September 27, 2008 | Mount Lemmon | Mount Lemmon Survey | · | 1.0 km | MPC · JPL |
| 705072 | 2008 UU_{389} | — | May 15, 2018 | Mount Lemmon | Mount Lemmon Survey | · | 2.5 km | MPC · JPL |
| 705073 | 2008 UH_{390} | — | March 18, 2017 | Mount Lemmon | Mount Lemmon Survey | · | 2.6 km | MPC · JPL |
| 705074 | 2008 UO_{390} | — | January 1, 2014 | Haleakala | Pan-STARRS 1 | · | 1.2 km | MPC · JPL |
| 705075 | 2008 UP_{392} | — | July 15, 2013 | Haleakala | Pan-STARRS 1 | · | 2.3 km | MPC · JPL |
| 705076 | 2008 UR_{393} | — | September 24, 2015 | Mount Lemmon | Mount Lemmon Survey | · | 520 m | MPC · JPL |
| 705077 | 2008 UN_{395} | — | July 14, 2013 | Haleakala | Pan-STARRS 1 | · | 2.1 km | MPC · JPL |
| 705078 | 2008 UP_{395} | — | December 16, 2009 | Mount Lemmon | Mount Lemmon Survey | · | 2.8 km | MPC · JPL |
| 705079 | 2008 UK_{396} | — | October 22, 2008 | Kitt Peak | Spacewatch | AGN | 850 m | MPC · JPL |
| 705080 | 2008 US_{396} | — | August 8, 2013 | Haleakala | Pan-STARRS 1 | THM | 1.7 km | MPC · JPL |
| 705081 | 2008 UA_{399} | — | March 2, 2011 | Kitt Peak | Spacewatch | · | 2.3 km | MPC · JPL |
| 705082 | 2008 UX_{399} | — | October 20, 2008 | Kitt Peak | Spacewatch | · | 2.6 km | MPC · JPL |
| 705083 | 2008 UN_{400} | — | September 16, 2017 | Haleakala | Pan-STARRS 1 | · | 1.5 km | MPC · JPL |
| 705084 | 2008 UO_{400} | — | October 20, 2008 | Mount Lemmon | Mount Lemmon Survey | · | 2.3 km | MPC · JPL |
| 705085 | 2008 UT_{400} | — | September 15, 2013 | Mount Lemmon | Mount Lemmon Survey | · | 2.0 km | MPC · JPL |
| 705086 | 2008 UD_{401} | — | July 15, 2013 | Haleakala | Pan-STARRS 1 | VER | 2.0 km | MPC · JPL |
| 705087 | 2008 UH_{404} | — | October 25, 2008 | Kitt Peak | Spacewatch | · | 2.4 km | MPC · JPL |
| 705088 | 2008 UJ_{404} | — | October 27, 2008 | Mount Lemmon | Mount Lemmon Survey | · | 870 m | MPC · JPL |
| 705089 | 2008 US_{404} | — | October 20, 2008 | Kitt Peak | Spacewatch | AGN | 900 m | MPC · JPL |
| 705090 | 2008 UG_{407} | — | October 26, 2008 | Kitt Peak | Spacewatch | · | 1.7 km | MPC · JPL |
| 705091 | 2008 UL_{407} | — | October 31, 2008 | Mount Lemmon | Mount Lemmon Survey | EOS | 1.7 km | MPC · JPL |
| 705092 | 2008 UY_{408} | — | October 23, 2008 | Mount Lemmon | Mount Lemmon Survey | · | 1.1 km | MPC · JPL |
| 705093 | 2008 UR_{414} | — | October 24, 2008 | Kitt Peak | Spacewatch | · | 550 m | MPC · JPL |
| 705094 | 2008 UE_{415} | — | October 21, 2008 | Kitt Peak | Spacewatch | · | 490 m | MPC · JPL |
| 705095 | 2008 US_{419} | — | October 29, 2008 | Mount Lemmon | Mount Lemmon Survey | · | 1.5 km | MPC · JPL |
| 705096 | 2008 UT_{419} | — | October 20, 2008 | Mount Lemmon | Mount Lemmon Survey | · | 1.2 km | MPC · JPL |
| 705097 | 2008 UV_{420} | — | October 29, 2008 | Kitt Peak | Spacewatch | · | 1.1 km | MPC · JPL |
| 705098 | 2008 UE_{422} | — | October 22, 2008 | Kitt Peak | Spacewatch | · | 2.2 km | MPC · JPL |
| 705099 | 2008 VA_{1} | — | October 7, 2008 | Kitt Peak | Spacewatch | · | 2.3 km | MPC · JPL |
| 705100 | 2008 VM_{1} | — | September 24, 2008 | Kitt Peak | Spacewatch | · | 3.1 km | MPC · JPL |

== 705101–705200 ==
back to top

| Designation | | | Discovery | | | Properties | | Ref |
| Permanent | Provisional | Named after | Date | Site | Discoverer(s) | Category | Diam. | Ref |
|---|---|---|---|---|---|---|---|---|
| 705101 | 2008 VB_{6} | — | November 1, 2008 | Mount Lemmon | Mount Lemmon Survey | VER | 3.1 km | MPC · JPL |
| 705102 | 2008 VU_{7} | — | March 30, 2003 | Kitt Peak | Deep Ecliptic Survey | · | 490 m | MPC · JPL |
| 705103 | 2008 VK_{9} | — | November 2, 2008 | Mount Lemmon | Mount Lemmon Survey | · | 2.4 km | MPC · JPL |
| 705104 | 2008 VW_{11} | — | November 2, 2008 | Mount Lemmon | Mount Lemmon Survey | · | 2.3 km | MPC · JPL |
| 705105 | 2008 VV_{16} | — | October 24, 2008 | Kitt Peak | Spacewatch | · | 2.3 km | MPC · JPL |
| 705106 | 2008 VW_{23} | — | November 1, 2008 | Kitt Peak | Spacewatch | · | 2.0 km | MPC · JPL |
| 705107 | 2008 VU_{28} | — | September 29, 2008 | Mount Lemmon | Mount Lemmon Survey | VER | 2.5 km | MPC · JPL |
| 705108 | 2008 VL_{29} | — | October 26, 2008 | Kitt Peak | Spacewatch | URS | 2.5 km | MPC · JPL |
| 705109 | 2008 VR_{29} | — | November 2, 2008 | Mount Lemmon | Mount Lemmon Survey | MAR | 880 m | MPC · JPL |
| 705110 | 2008 VH_{31} | — | October 6, 2008 | Mount Lemmon | Mount Lemmon Survey | · | 2.4 km | MPC · JPL |
| 705111 | 2008 VV_{31} | — | October 6, 2008 | Mount Lemmon | Mount Lemmon Survey | · | 1.3 km | MPC · JPL |
| 705112 | 2008 VE_{32} | — | November 2, 2008 | Mount Lemmon | Mount Lemmon Survey | · | 580 m | MPC · JPL |
| 705113 | 2008 VP_{33} | — | January 26, 2001 | Kitt Peak | Spacewatch | · | 1.2 km | MPC · JPL |
| 705114 | 2008 VZ_{35} | — | November 2, 2008 | Mount Lemmon | Mount Lemmon Survey | · | 1.1 km | MPC · JPL |
| 705115 | 2008 VS_{36} | — | November 2, 2008 | Mount Lemmon | Mount Lemmon Survey | · | 1.1 km | MPC · JPL |
| 705116 | 2008 VU_{36} | — | November 2, 2008 | Mount Lemmon | Mount Lemmon Survey | · | 1.1 km | MPC · JPL |
| 705117 | 2008 VD_{40} | — | October 27, 2008 | Mount Lemmon | Mount Lemmon Survey | · | 2.3 km | MPC · JPL |
| 705118 | 2008 VE_{45} | — | July 18, 2007 | Mount Lemmon | Mount Lemmon Survey | · | 2.7 km | MPC · JPL |
| 705119 | 2008 VU_{45} | — | October 5, 2005 | Catalina | CSS | H | 440 m | MPC · JPL |
| 705120 | 2008 VW_{45} | — | November 3, 2008 | Mount Lemmon | Mount Lemmon Survey | · | 2.8 km | MPC · JPL |
| 705121 | 2008 VZ_{45} | — | September 27, 2008 | Mount Lemmon | Mount Lemmon Survey | · | 3.0 km | MPC · JPL |
| 705122 | 2008 VX_{46} | — | November 3, 2008 | Kitt Peak | Spacewatch | · | 2.5 km | MPC · JPL |
| 705123 | 2008 VM_{49} | — | October 28, 2008 | Mount Lemmon | Mount Lemmon Survey | · | 3.3 km | MPC · JPL |
| 705124 | 2008 VP_{49} | — | September 4, 2007 | Mount Lemmon | Mount Lemmon Survey | · | 2.5 km | MPC · JPL |
| 705125 | 2008 VK_{52} | — | September 29, 2008 | Mount Lemmon | Mount Lemmon Survey | · | 2.8 km | MPC · JPL |
| 705126 | 2008 VE_{55} | — | October 29, 2008 | Kitt Peak | Spacewatch | · | 2.5 km | MPC · JPL |
| 705127 | 2008 VK_{69} | — | January 17, 2004 | Palomar | NEAT | · | 2.6 km | MPC · JPL |
| 705128 | 2008 VF_{74} | — | November 7, 2008 | Mount Lemmon | Mount Lemmon Survey | EOS | 1.7 km | MPC · JPL |
| 705129 | 2008 VV_{79} | — | November 2, 2008 | Kitt Peak | Spacewatch | · | 1.5 km | MPC · JPL |
| 705130 | 2008 VG_{84} | — | November 7, 2008 | Mount Lemmon | Mount Lemmon Survey | · | 1.3 km | MPC · JPL |
| 705131 | 2008 VV_{84} | — | April 30, 2006 | Kitt Peak | Spacewatch | · | 2.8 km | MPC · JPL |
| 705132 | 2008 VH_{85} | — | December 7, 2012 | Mount Lemmon | Mount Lemmon Survey | HNS | 1.1 km | MPC · JPL |
| 705133 | 2008 VK_{86} | — | October 24, 2013 | Haleakala | Pan-STARRS 1 | H | 530 m | MPC · JPL |
| 705134 | 2008 VZ_{86} | — | November 9, 2008 | Kitt Peak | Spacewatch | MAR | 750 m | MPC · JPL |
| 705135 | 2008 VK_{88} | — | November 29, 2014 | Mount Lemmon | Mount Lemmon Survey | · | 2.8 km | MPC · JPL |
| 705136 | 2008 VD_{89} | — | November 1, 2008 | Mount Lemmon | Mount Lemmon Survey | MAR | 900 m | MPC · JPL |
| 705137 | 2008 VE_{90} | — | September 9, 2013 | Haleakala | Pan-STARRS 1 | · | 2.6 km | MPC · JPL |
| 705138 | 2008 VH_{90} | — | July 9, 2018 | Haleakala | Pan-STARRS 1 | EOS | 1.5 km | MPC · JPL |
| 705139 | 2008 VN_{90} | — | November 1, 2008 | Mount Lemmon | Mount Lemmon Survey | · | 2.3 km | MPC · JPL |
| 705140 | 2008 VO_{90} | — | October 20, 2008 | Kitt Peak | Spacewatch | · | 2.1 km | MPC · JPL |
| 705141 | 2008 VV_{90} | — | November 8, 2008 | Kitt Peak | Spacewatch | · | 2.4 km | MPC · JPL |
| 705142 | 2008 VW_{90} | — | February 5, 2016 | Haleakala | Pan-STARRS 1 | · | 2.5 km | MPC · JPL |
| 705143 | 2008 VK_{91} | — | February 8, 2016 | Mount Lemmon | Mount Lemmon Survey | · | 2.9 km | MPC · JPL |
| 705144 | 2008 VN_{91} | — | March 19, 2017 | Mount Lemmon | Mount Lemmon Survey | · | 2.6 km | MPC · JPL |
| 705145 | 2008 VO_{91} | — | November 2, 2008 | Catalina | CSS | · | 2.9 km | MPC · JPL |
| 705146 | 2008 VD_{92} | — | November 7, 2008 | Mount Lemmon | Mount Lemmon Survey | · | 600 m | MPC · JPL |
| 705147 | 2008 VY_{92} | — | September 6, 2016 | Haleakala | Pan-STARRS 1 | MAR | 790 m | MPC · JPL |
| 705148 | 2008 VO_{93} | — | February 14, 2013 | Catalina | CSS | · | 650 m | MPC · JPL |
| 705149 | 2008 VO_{94} | — | November 9, 2008 | Kitt Peak | Spacewatch | · | 2.7 km | MPC · JPL |
| 705150 | 2008 VW_{94} | — | May 1, 2012 | Mount Lemmon | Mount Lemmon Survey | · | 3.1 km | MPC · JPL |
| 705151 | 2008 VH_{95} | — | May 26, 2015 | Haleakala | Pan-STARRS 1 | · | 1.0 km | MPC · JPL |
| 705152 | 2008 VT_{95} | — | November 1, 2008 | Mount Lemmon | Mount Lemmon Survey | · | 3.0 km | MPC · JPL |
| 705153 | 2008 VQ_{96} | — | March 10, 2011 | Kitt Peak | Spacewatch | · | 2.6 km | MPC · JPL |
| 705154 | 2008 VR_{96} | — | November 29, 2014 | Mount Lemmon | Mount Lemmon Survey | (21885) | 2.6 km | MPC · JPL |
| 705155 | 2008 VK_{99} | — | November 1, 2008 | Kitt Peak | Spacewatch | · | 1.2 km | MPC · JPL |
| 705156 | 2008 VF_{102} | — | November 2, 2008 | Kitt Peak | Spacewatch | · | 2.8 km | MPC · JPL |
| 705157 | 2008 VK_{106} | — | November 2, 2008 | Mount Lemmon | Mount Lemmon Survey | · | 1.4 km | MPC · JPL |
| 705158 | 2008 VL_{108} | — | September 13, 2013 | Mount Lemmon | Mount Lemmon Survey | · | 2.0 km | MPC · JPL |
| 705159 | 2008 VP_{110} | — | November 8, 2008 | Mount Lemmon | Mount Lemmon Survey | · | 2.6 km | MPC · JPL |
| 705160 | 2008 WM_{6} | — | October 22, 2008 | Kitt Peak | Spacewatch | · | 2.7 km | MPC · JPL |
| 705161 | 2008 WZ_{11} | — | November 21, 2003 | Kitt Peak | Spacewatch | · | 2.9 km | MPC · JPL |
| 705162 | 2008 WL_{12} | — | September 22, 2008 | Mount Lemmon | Mount Lemmon Survey | THB | 2.8 km | MPC · JPL |
| 705163 | 2008 WY_{15} | — | October 22, 2008 | Kitt Peak | Spacewatch | · | 2.6 km | MPC · JPL |
| 705164 | 2008 WE_{19} | — | September 28, 2008 | Mount Lemmon | Mount Lemmon Survey | · | 850 m | MPC · JPL |
| 705165 | 2008 WP_{20} | — | November 17, 2008 | Kitt Peak | Spacewatch | · | 1.2 km | MPC · JPL |
| 705166 | 2008 WJ_{21} | — | November 17, 2008 | Kitt Peak | Spacewatch | · | 950 m | MPC · JPL |
| 705167 | 2008 WR_{22} | — | November 7, 2008 | Kitt Peak | Spacewatch | · | 2.6 km | MPC · JPL |
| 705168 | 2008 WP_{27} | — | September 27, 2008 | Mount Lemmon | Mount Lemmon Survey | · | 1.2 km | MPC · JPL |
| 705169 | 2008 WX_{28} | — | November 1, 2008 | Mount Lemmon | Mount Lemmon Survey | EUN | 1.3 km | MPC · JPL |
| 705170 | 2008 WX_{30} | — | November 19, 2008 | Mount Lemmon | Mount Lemmon Survey | · | 3.0 km | MPC · JPL |
| 705171 | 2008 WB_{31} | — | November 19, 2008 | Mount Lemmon | Mount Lemmon Survey | TIR | 2.4 km | MPC · JPL |
| 705172 | 2008 WC_{32} | — | November 19, 2008 | Kitt Peak | Spacewatch | · | 2.4 km | MPC · JPL |
| 705173 | 2008 WU_{33} | — | November 2, 2008 | Kitt Peak | Spacewatch | · | 1.9 km | MPC · JPL |
| 705174 | 2008 WJ_{35} | — | November 17, 2008 | Kitt Peak | Spacewatch | · | 2.7 km | MPC · JPL |
| 705175 | 2008 WA_{37} | — | November 17, 2008 | Kitt Peak | Spacewatch | HOF | 1.8 km | MPC · JPL |
| 705176 | 2008 WV_{40} | — | November 7, 2008 | Mount Lemmon | Mount Lemmon Survey | HYG | 2.5 km | MPC · JPL |
| 705177 | 2008 WT_{43} | — | November 17, 2008 | Kitt Peak | Spacewatch | AGN | 1.0 km | MPC · JPL |
| 705178 | 2008 WJ_{51} | — | October 27, 2008 | Kitt Peak | Spacewatch | · | 2.4 km | MPC · JPL |
| 705179 | 2008 WL_{51} | — | October 6, 2008 | Mount Lemmon | Mount Lemmon Survey | · | 1.1 km | MPC · JPL |
| 705180 | 2008 WJ_{52} | — | October 8, 2004 | Kitt Peak | Spacewatch | · | 920 m | MPC · JPL |
| 705181 | 2008 WL_{55} | — | November 20, 2008 | Kitt Peak | Spacewatch | · | 1.1 km | MPC · JPL |
| 705182 | 2008 WE_{58} | — | September 22, 2008 | Mount Lemmon | Mount Lemmon Survey | · | 2.7 km | MPC · JPL |
| 705183 | 2008 WE_{65} | — | October 28, 2008 | Mount Lemmon | Mount Lemmon Survey | · | 2.5 km | MPC · JPL |
| 705184 | 2008 WO_{72} | — | September 27, 2008 | Mount Lemmon | Mount Lemmon Survey | KON | 1.9 km | MPC · JPL |
| 705185 | 2008 WC_{73} | — | November 19, 2008 | Mount Lemmon | Mount Lemmon Survey | KON | 1.8 km | MPC · JPL |
| 705186 | 2008 WJ_{76} | — | November 20, 2008 | Kitt Peak | Spacewatch | · | 3.3 km | MPC · JPL |
| 705187 | 2008 WK_{78} | — | November 20, 2008 | Kitt Peak | Spacewatch | · | 3.4 km | MPC · JPL |
| 705188 | 2008 WZ_{85} | — | November 20, 2008 | Kitt Peak | Spacewatch | · | 1.1 km | MPC · JPL |
| 705189 | 2008 WL_{87} | — | November 1, 2008 | Mount Lemmon | Mount Lemmon Survey | NYS | 870 m | MPC · JPL |
| 705190 | 2008 WP_{87} | — | November 1, 2008 | Mount Lemmon | Mount Lemmon Survey | · | 480 m | MPC · JPL |
| 705191 | 2008 WW_{90} | — | May 4, 2006 | Kitt Peak | Spacewatch | EOS | 1.6 km | MPC · JPL |
| 705192 | 2008 WA_{92} | — | November 3, 2008 | Kitt Peak | Spacewatch | · | 770 m | MPC · JPL |
| 705193 | 2008 WC_{93} | — | November 26, 2008 | Cordell-Lorenz | D. T. Durig | · | 2.9 km | MPC · JPL |
| 705194 | 2008 WR_{96} | — | November 29, 2008 | Zelenchukskaya | T. V. Krjačko, B. Satovski | · | 1.3 km | MPC · JPL |
| 705195 | 2008 WH_{98} | — | October 26, 2008 | Catalina | CSS | · | 2.4 km | MPC · JPL |
| 705196 | 2008 WQ_{98} | — | November 8, 2008 | Kitt Peak | Spacewatch | H | 600 m | MPC · JPL |
| 705197 | 2008 WX_{98} | — | November 3, 2008 | Kitt Peak | Spacewatch | · | 1.8 km | MPC · JPL |
| 705198 | 2008 WC_{105} | — | November 30, 2008 | Mount Lemmon | Mount Lemmon Survey | HOF | 2.1 km | MPC · JPL |
| 705199 | 2008 WZ_{106} | — | January 19, 1994 | Kitt Peak | Spacewatch | · | 1.1 km | MPC · JPL |
| 705200 | 2008 WA_{113} | — | November 21, 2008 | Kitt Peak | Spacewatch | · | 2.7 km | MPC · JPL |

== 705201–705300 ==
back to top

| Designation | | | Discovery | | | Properties | | Ref |
| Permanent | Provisional | Named after | Date | Site | Discoverer(s) | Category | Diam. | Ref |
|---|---|---|---|---|---|---|---|---|
| 705201 | 2008 WN_{120} | — | November 30, 2008 | Kitt Peak | Spacewatch | · | 1.8 km | MPC · JPL |
| 705202 | 2008 WY_{122} | — | October 23, 2008 | Kitt Peak | Spacewatch | VER | 2.5 km | MPC · JPL |
| 705203 | 2008 WP_{128} | — | October 22, 2008 | Kitt Peak | Spacewatch | · | 2.9 km | MPC · JPL |
| 705204 | 2008 WQ_{130} | — | November 30, 2008 | Mount Lemmon | Mount Lemmon Survey | · | 2.6 km | MPC · JPL |
| 705205 | 2008 WK_{135} | — | November 18, 2008 | Kitt Peak | Spacewatch | AEO | 1.1 km | MPC · JPL |
| 705206 | 2008 WH_{136} | — | October 13, 2002 | Palomar | NEAT | TIR | 3.2 km | MPC · JPL |
| 705207 | 2008 WK_{143} | — | November 21, 2008 | Kitt Peak | Spacewatch | · | 1.1 km | MPC · JPL |
| 705208 | 2008 WR_{143} | — | November 19, 2008 | Kitt Peak | Spacewatch | · | 2.7 km | MPC · JPL |
| 705209 | 2008 WC_{144} | — | November 20, 2008 | Kitt Peak | Spacewatch | · | 2.5 km | MPC · JPL |
| 705210 | 2008 WK_{144} | — | November 24, 2008 | Mount Lemmon | Mount Lemmon Survey | · | 1.8 km | MPC · JPL |
| 705211 | 2008 WN_{144} | — | March 19, 2010 | Mount Lemmon | Mount Lemmon Survey | · | 1.3 km | MPC · JPL |
| 705212 | 2008 WQ_{144} | — | March 4, 2011 | Kitt Peak | Spacewatch | · | 3.0 km | MPC · JPL |
| 705213 | 2008 WG_{146} | — | November 2, 2008 | Kitt Peak | Spacewatch | · | 2.7 km | MPC · JPL |
| 705214 | 2008 WP_{146} | — | June 13, 2015 | Haleakala | Pan-STARRS 1 | · | 1.3 km | MPC · JPL |
| 705215 | 2008 WR_{146} | — | November 19, 2008 | Mount Lemmon | Mount Lemmon Survey | HYG | 2.2 km | MPC · JPL |
| 705216 | 2008 WE_{149} | — | November 26, 2014 | Haleakala | Pan-STARRS 1 | · | 2.9 km | MPC · JPL |
| 705217 | 2008 WS_{149} | — | September 14, 2013 | Kitt Peak | Spacewatch | · | 2.3 km | MPC · JPL |
| 705218 | 2008 WW_{149} | — | November 20, 2008 | Kitt Peak | Spacewatch | · | 2.5 km | MPC · JPL |
| 705219 | 2008 WB_{150} | — | November 21, 2008 | Mount Lemmon | Mount Lemmon Survey | · | 2.2 km | MPC · JPL |
| 705220 | 2008 WH_{150} | — | June 14, 2018 | Haleakala | Pan-STARRS 2 | · | 2.3 km | MPC · JPL |
| 705221 | 2008 WO_{150} | — | October 15, 2012 | Mount Lemmon | Mount Lemmon Survey | · | 1.1 km | MPC · JPL |
| 705222 | 2008 WR_{150} | — | October 31, 2008 | Kitt Peak | Spacewatch | L4 | 5.8 km | MPC · JPL |
| 705223 | 2008 WD_{151} | — | September 10, 2013 | Haleakala | Pan-STARRS 1 | · | 2.0 km | MPC · JPL |
| 705224 | 2008 WG_{151} | — | November 18, 2008 | Kitt Peak | Spacewatch | · | 1.4 km | MPC · JPL |
| 705225 | 2008 WP_{152} | — | November 19, 2008 | Kitt Peak | Spacewatch | · | 1.1 km | MPC · JPL |
| 705226 | 2008 WU_{152} | — | April 3, 2016 | Haleakala | Pan-STARRS 1 | · | 3.2 km | MPC · JPL |
| 705227 | 2008 WK_{153} | — | June 26, 2015 | Haleakala | Pan-STARRS 1 | EUN | 840 m | MPC · JPL |
| 705228 | 2008 WY_{153} | — | November 30, 2008 | Mount Lemmon | Mount Lemmon Survey | · | 700 m | MPC · JPL |
| 705229 | 2008 WB_{154} | — | February 3, 2016 | Haleakala | Pan-STARRS 1 | EOS | 1.7 km | MPC · JPL |
| 705230 | 2008 WX_{154} | — | February 28, 2014 | Mount Lemmon | Mount Lemmon Survey | · | 1.3 km | MPC · JPL |
| 705231 | 2008 WY_{154} | — | October 8, 2012 | Kitt Peak | Spacewatch | · | 880 m | MPC · JPL |
| 705232 | 2008 WF_{155} | — | May 20, 2012 | Charleston | R. Holmes | · | 2.5 km | MPC · JPL |
| 705233 | 2008 WV_{158} | — | November 24, 2008 | Kitt Peak | Spacewatch | · | 680 m | MPC · JPL |
| 705234 | 2008 WF_{159} | — | November 18, 2008 | Kitt Peak | Spacewatch | · | 1.5 km | MPC · JPL |
| 705235 | 2008 WK_{159} | — | November 30, 2008 | Kitt Peak | Spacewatch | · | 540 m | MPC · JPL |
| 705236 | 2008 WM_{159} | — | November 20, 2008 | Kitt Peak | Spacewatch | · | 980 m | MPC · JPL |
| 705237 | 2008 WY_{159} | — | November 18, 2008 | Kitt Peak | Spacewatch | · | 2.2 km | MPC · JPL |
| 705238 | 2008 WF_{160} | — | November 21, 2008 | Mount Lemmon | Mount Lemmon Survey | KOR | 930 m | MPC · JPL |
| 705239 | 2008 WA_{161} | — | November 22, 2008 | Kitt Peak | Spacewatch | · | 1.1 km | MPC · JPL |
| 705240 | 2008 WN_{161} | — | November 22, 2008 | Kitt Peak | Spacewatch | H | 480 m | MPC · JPL |
| 705241 | 2008 WE_{164} | — | November 18, 2008 | Kitt Peak | Spacewatch | · | 1.1 km | MPC · JPL |
| 705242 | 2008 WS_{168} | — | November 19, 2008 | Mount Lemmon | Mount Lemmon Survey | · | 460 m | MPC · JPL |
| 705243 | 2008 XC_{10} | — | December 2, 2008 | Mount Lemmon | Mount Lemmon Survey | · | 590 m | MPC · JPL |
| 705244 | 2008 XY_{12} | — | December 2, 2008 | Mount Lemmon | Mount Lemmon Survey | · | 1.5 km | MPC · JPL |
| 705245 | 2008 XP_{15} | — | September 4, 2007 | Catalina | CSS | · | 3.0 km | MPC · JPL |
| 705246 | 2008 XV_{18} | — | December 1, 2008 | Kitt Peak | Spacewatch | · | 2.9 km | MPC · JPL |
| 705247 | 2008 XW_{18} | — | December 1, 2008 | Kitt Peak | Spacewatch | · | 2.6 km | MPC · JPL |
| 705248 | 2008 XE_{19} | — | December 1, 2008 | Kitt Peak | Spacewatch | HNS | 950 m | MPC · JPL |
| 705249 | 2008 XU_{21} | — | November 23, 2008 | Kitt Peak | Spacewatch | VER | 2.6 km | MPC · JPL |
| 705250 | 2008 XF_{22} | — | September 4, 2008 | Kitt Peak | Spacewatch | · | 2.7 km | MPC · JPL |
| 705251 | 2008 XS_{24} | — | October 23, 2008 | Kitt Peak | Spacewatch | · | 2.5 km | MPC · JPL |
| 705252 | 2008 XO_{25} | — | December 4, 2008 | Mount Lemmon | Mount Lemmon Survey | HNS | 910 m | MPC · JPL |
| 705253 | 2008 XZ_{27} | — | December 4, 2008 | Mount Lemmon | Mount Lemmon Survey | EOS | 1.9 km | MPC · JPL |
| 705254 | 2008 XZ_{28} | — | December 4, 2008 | Mount Lemmon | Mount Lemmon Survey | · | 2.7 km | MPC · JPL |
| 705255 | 2008 XL_{30} | — | December 1, 2008 | Mount Lemmon | Mount Lemmon Survey | · | 1.0 km | MPC · JPL |
| 705256 | 2008 XE_{32} | — | April 22, 2007 | Kitt Peak | Spacewatch | · | 1.2 km | MPC · JPL |
| 705257 | 2008 XU_{32} | — | December 2, 2008 | Kitt Peak | Spacewatch | VER | 2.7 km | MPC · JPL |
| 705258 | 2008 XQ_{34} | — | December 2, 2008 | Kitt Peak | Spacewatch | VER | 2.3 km | MPC · JPL |
| 705259 | 2008 XV_{39} | — | December 2, 2008 | Kitt Peak | Spacewatch | · | 1.2 km | MPC · JPL |
| 705260 | 2008 XV_{45} | — | October 25, 2008 | Kitt Peak | Spacewatch | · | 710 m | MPC · JPL |
| 705261 | 2008 XB_{46} | — | October 29, 2008 | Kitt Peak | Spacewatch | · | 2.9 km | MPC · JPL |
| 705262 | 2008 XB_{48} | — | December 4, 2008 | Mount Lemmon | Mount Lemmon Survey | · | 1.2 km | MPC · JPL |
| 705263 | 2008 XD_{48} | — | December 4, 2008 | Mount Lemmon | Mount Lemmon Survey | · | 1.4 km | MPC · JPL |
| 705264 | 2008 XB_{52} | — | December 4, 2008 | Mount Lemmon | Mount Lemmon Survey | MAR | 910 m | MPC · JPL |
| 705265 | 2008 XZ_{54} | — | December 6, 2008 | Kitt Peak | Spacewatch | · | 2.0 km | MPC · JPL |
| 705266 | 2008 XH_{55} | — | December 2, 2008 | Mount Lemmon | Mount Lemmon Survey | TIR | 2.9 km | MPC · JPL |
| 705267 | 2008 XK_{55} | — | December 5, 2008 | Mount Lemmon | Mount Lemmon Survey | · | 1.5 km | MPC · JPL |
| 705268 | 2008 XQ_{57} | — | November 4, 2012 | Mount Lemmon | Mount Lemmon Survey | · | 1.4 km | MPC · JPL |
| 705269 | 2008 XR_{57} | — | April 10, 2014 | Haleakala | Pan-STARRS 1 | · | 1.8 km | MPC · JPL |
| 705270 | 2008 XS_{57} | — | December 4, 2008 | Mount Lemmon | Mount Lemmon Survey | · | 640 m | MPC · JPL |
| 705271 | 2008 XT_{57} | — | April 27, 2012 | Mount Lemmon | Mount Lemmon Survey | · | 3.4 km | MPC · JPL |
| 705272 | 2008 XE_{58} | — | December 3, 2008 | Mount Lemmon | Mount Lemmon Survey | · | 1.6 km | MPC · JPL |
| 705273 | 2008 XL_{58} | — | November 7, 2012 | Mount Lemmon | Mount Lemmon Survey | EUN | 1.1 km | MPC · JPL |
| 705274 | 2008 XR_{58} | — | October 13, 2013 | Mount Lemmon | Mount Lemmon Survey | · | 2.8 km | MPC · JPL |
| 705275 | 2008 XS_{58} | — | December 1, 2008 | Kitt Peak | Spacewatch | VER | 2.5 km | MPC · JPL |
| 705276 | 2008 XZ_{58} | — | September 27, 2012 | Haleakala | Pan-STARRS 1 | · | 1.2 km | MPC · JPL |
| 705277 | 2008 XF_{61} | — | February 26, 2016 | Mount Lemmon | Mount Lemmon Survey | · | 3.0 km | MPC · JPL |
| 705278 | 2008 XH_{61} | — | December 1, 2008 | Kitt Peak | Spacewatch | VER | 2.1 km | MPC · JPL |
| 705279 | 2008 XL_{61} | — | October 1, 2002 | Haleakala | NEAT | TIR | 2.7 km | MPC · JPL |
| 705280 | 2008 XM_{61} | — | December 10, 2014 | Mount Lemmon | Mount Lemmon Survey | · | 2.9 km | MPC · JPL |
| 705281 | 2008 XO_{61} | — | October 4, 2012 | Mount Lemmon | Mount Lemmon Survey | · | 1.4 km | MPC · JPL |
| 705282 | 2008 XP_{61} | — | March 22, 2015 | Haleakala | Pan-STARRS 1 | · | 1.1 km | MPC · JPL |
| 705283 | 2008 XV_{61} | — | May 2, 2017 | Mount Lemmon | Mount Lemmon Survey | · | 2.4 km | MPC · JPL |
| 705284 | 2008 XA_{62} | — | November 24, 2008 | Kitt Peak | Spacewatch | · | 2.5 km | MPC · JPL |
| 705285 | 2008 XN_{62} | — | March 7, 2016 | Haleakala | Pan-STARRS 1 | · | 2.6 km | MPC · JPL |
| 705286 | 2008 XV_{62} | — | March 30, 2015 | Haleakala | Pan-STARRS 1 | · | 1.2 km | MPC · JPL |
| 705287 | 2008 XV_{63} | — | June 16, 2018 | Haleakala | Pan-STARRS 1 | · | 2.9 km | MPC · JPL |
| 705288 | 2008 XY_{63} | — | January 9, 2016 | Haleakala | Pan-STARRS 1 | · | 2.7 km | MPC · JPL |
| 705289 | 2008 XC_{64} | — | January 28, 2014 | Kitt Peak | Spacewatch | · | 1.2 km | MPC · JPL |
| 705290 | 2008 XO_{64} | — | December 3, 2008 | Mount Lemmon | Mount Lemmon Survey | · | 2.6 km | MPC · JPL |
| 705291 | 2008 XP_{64} | — | January 18, 2016 | Haleakala | Pan-STARRS 1 | · | 2.6 km | MPC · JPL |
| 705292 | 2008 XG_{65} | — | November 26, 2014 | Haleakala | Pan-STARRS 1 | EOS | 1.8 km | MPC · JPL |
| 705293 | 2008 XY_{66} | — | December 5, 2008 | Kitt Peak | Spacewatch | · | 1.2 km | MPC · JPL |
| 705294 | 2008 XP_{67} | — | December 5, 2008 | Kitt Peak | Spacewatch | MAR | 950 m | MPC · JPL |
| 705295 | 2008 XC_{70} | — | December 4, 2008 | Mount Lemmon | Mount Lemmon Survey | · | 2.5 km | MPC · JPL |
| 705296 | 2008 YL_{4} | — | November 24, 2008 | Mount Lemmon | Mount Lemmon Survey | · | 1.9 km | MPC · JPL |
| 705297 | 2008 YC_{8} | — | December 23, 2008 | Dauban | C. Rinner, Kugel, F. | · | 1.3 km | MPC · JPL |
| 705298 | 2008 YU_{12} | — | December 4, 2008 | Kitt Peak | Spacewatch | · | 1.4 km | MPC · JPL |
| 705299 | 2008 YT_{14} | — | May 8, 2006 | Mount Lemmon | Mount Lemmon Survey | · | 2.9 km | MPC · JPL |
| 705300 | 2008 YJ_{16} | — | December 21, 2008 | Mount Lemmon | Mount Lemmon Survey | · | 2.7 km | MPC · JPL |

== 705301–705400 ==
back to top

| Designation | | | Discovery | | | Properties | | Ref |
| Permanent | Provisional | Named after | Date | Site | Discoverer(s) | Category | Diam. | Ref |
|---|---|---|---|---|---|---|---|---|
| 705301 | 2008 YA_{28} | — | December 28, 2008 | Wildberg | R. Apitzsch | · | 1.6 km | MPC · JPL |
| 705302 | 2008 YV_{31} | — | December 29, 2008 | Bergisch Gladbach | W. Bickel | URS | 3.3 km | MPC · JPL |
| 705303 | 2008 YQ_{32} | — | December 30, 2008 | Piszkéstető | K. Sárneczky | EOS | 1.7 km | MPC · JPL |
| 705304 | 2008 YZ_{41} | — | November 19, 2008 | Kitt Peak | Spacewatch | · | 1.1 km | MPC · JPL |
| 705305 | 2008 YA_{48} | — | November 2, 2008 | Mount Lemmon | Mount Lemmon Survey | · | 3.1 km | MPC · JPL |
| 705306 | 2008 YK_{53} | — | December 29, 2008 | Mount Lemmon | Mount Lemmon Survey | · | 2.4 km | MPC · JPL |
| 705307 | 2008 YY_{55} | — | December 30, 2008 | Kitt Peak | Spacewatch | · | 1.3 km | MPC · JPL |
| 705308 | 2008 YP_{57} | — | May 1, 2006 | Kitt Peak | Spacewatch | T_{j} (2.98) | 3.5 km | MPC · JPL |
| 705309 | 2008 YG_{58} | — | December 22, 2008 | Kitt Peak | Spacewatch | MIS | 2.0 km | MPC · JPL |
| 705310 | 2008 YS_{59} | — | December 30, 2008 | Kitt Peak | Spacewatch | · | 2.9 km | MPC · JPL |
| 705311 | 2008 YY_{62} | — | December 30, 2008 | Mount Lemmon | Mount Lemmon Survey | · | 3.2 km | MPC · JPL |
| 705312 | 2008 YF_{63} | — | December 30, 2008 | Mount Lemmon | Mount Lemmon Survey | · | 1.2 km | MPC · JPL |
| 705313 | 2008 YQ_{64} | — | July 2, 2006 | Bergisch Gladbach | W. Bickel | HNS | 860 m | MPC · JPL |
| 705314 | 2008 YY_{66} | — | September 3, 2008 | Kitt Peak | Spacewatch | · | 2.7 km | MPC · JPL |
| 705315 | 2008 YD_{77} | — | December 4, 2008 | Mount Lemmon | Mount Lemmon Survey | · | 720 m | MPC · JPL |
| 705316 | 2008 YJ_{77} | — | December 4, 2008 | Mount Lemmon | Mount Lemmon Survey | · | 1.2 km | MPC · JPL |
| 705317 | 2008 YV_{77} | — | February 9, 2005 | Anderson Mesa | LONEOS | · | 1.1 km | MPC · JPL |
| 705318 | 2008 YH_{80} | — | October 13, 1999 | Apache Point | SDSS | · | 980 m | MPC · JPL |
| 705319 | 2008 YC_{81} | — | November 2, 2008 | Mount Lemmon | Mount Lemmon Survey | · | 1.2 km | MPC · JPL |
| 705320 | 2008 YU_{88} | — | December 29, 2008 | Kitt Peak | Spacewatch | · | 1.5 km | MPC · JPL |
| 705321 | 2008 YX_{94} | — | December 21, 2008 | Mount Lemmon | Mount Lemmon Survey | · | 2.7 km | MPC · JPL |
| 705322 | 2008 YK_{101} | — | December 29, 2008 | Kitt Peak | Spacewatch | · | 2.1 km | MPC · JPL |
| 705323 | 2008 YY_{105} | — | December 29, 2008 | Kitt Peak | Spacewatch | · | 1.4 km | MPC · JPL |
| 705324 | 2008 YB_{114} | — | September 14, 2007 | Mount Lemmon | Mount Lemmon Survey | · | 2.7 km | MPC · JPL |
| 705325 | 2008 YB_{116} | — | September 19, 2007 | Altschwendt | W. Ries | · | 1.6 km | MPC · JPL |
| 705326 | 2008 YM_{116} | — | December 21, 2008 | Mount Lemmon | Mount Lemmon Survey | (5) | 1.2 km | MPC · JPL |
| 705327 | 2008 YO_{118} | — | December 29, 2008 | Kitt Peak | Spacewatch | (5) | 860 m | MPC · JPL |
| 705328 | 2008 YU_{118} | — | December 29, 2008 | Kitt Peak | Spacewatch | · | 1.6 km | MPC · JPL |
| 705329 | 2008 YA_{119} | — | December 29, 2008 | Kitt Peak | Spacewatch | EOS | 1.8 km | MPC · JPL |
| 705330 | 2008 YB_{122} | — | December 30, 2008 | Kitt Peak | Spacewatch | · | 1.3 km | MPC · JPL |
| 705331 | 2008 YL_{122} | — | December 22, 2008 | Kitt Peak | Spacewatch | · | 2.5 km | MPC · JPL |
| 705332 | 2008 YT_{123} | — | December 22, 2008 | Mount Lemmon | Mount Lemmon Survey | HNS | 990 m | MPC · JPL |
| 705333 | 2008 YU_{123} | — | November 20, 2008 | Mount Lemmon | Mount Lemmon Survey | ADE | 1.5 km | MPC · JPL |
| 705334 | 2008 YZ_{126} | — | December 30, 2008 | Kitt Peak | Spacewatch | · | 2.5 km | MPC · JPL |
| 705335 | 2008 YW_{131} | — | December 31, 2008 | Kitt Peak | Spacewatch | · | 1.2 km | MPC · JPL |
| 705336 | 2008 YT_{140} | — | December 30, 2008 | Mount Lemmon | Mount Lemmon Survey | · | 1.6 km | MPC · JPL |
| 705337 | 2008 YL_{148} | — | December 26, 2008 | Wildberg | R. Apitzsch | · | 2.5 km | MPC · JPL |
| 705338 | 2008 YM_{161} | — | November 20, 2008 | Kitt Peak | Spacewatch | · | 1.0 km | MPC · JPL |
| 705339 | 2008 YC_{164} | — | December 26, 2008 | Mount Nyukasa | Japan Aerospace Exploration Agency | EOS | 2.0 km | MPC · JPL |
| 705340 | 2008 YZ_{170} | — | December 31, 2008 | Kitt Peak | Spacewatch | · | 1.9 km | MPC · JPL |
| 705341 | 2008 YC_{176} | — | December 21, 2008 | Kitt Peak | Spacewatch | · | 1.6 km | MPC · JPL |
| 705342 | 2008 YD_{176} | — | May 27, 2012 | Mount Lemmon | Mount Lemmon Survey | · | 3.6 km | MPC · JPL |
| 705343 | 2008 YR_{176} | — | December 6, 2012 | Mount Lemmon | Mount Lemmon Survey | GEF | 960 m | MPC · JPL |
| 705344 | 2008 YZ_{176} | — | November 20, 2012 | Mount Lemmon | Mount Lemmon Survey | · | 1.4 km | MPC · JPL |
| 705345 | 2008 YN_{177} | — | December 30, 2008 | Mount Lemmon | Mount Lemmon Survey | EOS | 1.8 km | MPC · JPL |
| 705346 | 2008 YS_{177} | — | December 11, 2012 | Mount Lemmon | Mount Lemmon Survey | · | 960 m | MPC · JPL |
| 705347 | 2008 YB_{178} | — | October 4, 2013 | Kitt Peak | Spacewatch | EOS | 1.9 km | MPC · JPL |
| 705348 | 2008 YD_{178} | — | December 31, 2008 | Mount Lemmon | Mount Lemmon Survey | HNS | 1.0 km | MPC · JPL |
| 705349 | 2008 YM_{178} | — | October 4, 2013 | Mount Lemmon | Mount Lemmon Survey | · | 3.4 km | MPC · JPL |
| 705350 | 2008 YB_{179} | — | July 6, 2016 | Haleakala | Pan-STARRS 1 | · | 1.8 km | MPC · JPL |
| 705351 | 2008 YD_{180} | — | January 16, 2016 | Haleakala | Pan-STARRS 1 | · | 650 m | MPC · JPL |
| 705352 | 2008 YO_{182} | — | December 31, 2008 | Kitt Peak | Spacewatch | · | 910 m | MPC · JPL |
| 705353 | 2008 YT_{182} | — | December 22, 2008 | Kitt Peak | Spacewatch | VER | 2.2 km | MPC · JPL |
| 705354 | 2008 YU_{182} | — | December 22, 2008 | Mount Lemmon | Mount Lemmon Survey | T_{j} (2.94) | 3.2 km | MPC · JPL |
| 705355 | 2008 YA_{183} | — | October 15, 2017 | Mount Lemmon | Mount Lemmon Survey | HOF | 2.1 km | MPC · JPL |
| 705356 | 2008 YL_{183} | — | December 29, 2008 | Kitt Peak | Spacewatch | · | 1.4 km | MPC · JPL |
| 705357 | 2008 YU_{183} | — | September 22, 2012 | Kitt Peak | Spacewatch | HOF | 2.0 km | MPC · JPL |
| 705358 | 2008 YM_{185} | — | February 26, 2014 | Mount Lemmon | Mount Lemmon Survey | · | 1.4 km | MPC · JPL |
| 705359 | 2008 YQ_{185} | — | February 28, 2014 | Mount Lemmon | Mount Lemmon Survey | · | 1.5 km | MPC · JPL |
| 705360 | 2008 YR_{185} | — | February 20, 2014 | Mount Lemmon | Mount Lemmon Survey | · | 1.8 km | MPC · JPL |
| 705361 | 2008 YS_{185} | — | October 31, 2013 | Mount Lemmon | Mount Lemmon Survey | · | 2.6 km | MPC · JPL |
| 705362 | 2008 YF_{186} | — | September 14, 2013 | Mount Lemmon | Mount Lemmon Survey | · | 2.6 km | MPC · JPL |
| 705363 | 2008 YH_{187} | — | December 21, 2008 | Mount Lemmon | Mount Lemmon Survey | VER | 2.6 km | MPC · JPL |
| 705364 | 2008 YE_{189} | — | December 31, 2008 | Kitt Peak | Spacewatch | · | 2.4 km | MPC · JPL |
| 705365 | 2008 YR_{189} | — | December 31, 2008 | Mount Lemmon | Mount Lemmon Survey | DOR | 2.1 km | MPC · JPL |
| 705366 | 2008 YZ_{189} | — | December 21, 2008 | Kitt Peak | Spacewatch | · | 2.0 km | MPC · JPL |
| 705367 | 2008 YJ_{190} | — | December 21, 2008 | Kitt Peak | Spacewatch | · | 1.1 km | MPC · JPL |
| 705368 | 2008 YS_{190} | — | December 30, 2008 | Mount Lemmon | Mount Lemmon Survey | (5) | 1.1 km | MPC · JPL |
| 705369 | 2008 YY_{190} | — | December 31, 2008 | Kitt Peak | Spacewatch | · | 1.3 km | MPC · JPL |
| 705370 | 2008 YK_{191} | — | December 21, 2008 | Kitt Peak | Spacewatch | HNS | 940 m | MPC · JPL |
| 705371 | 2008 YF_{192} | — | December 31, 2008 | Mount Lemmon | Mount Lemmon Survey | · | 1.1 km | MPC · JPL |
| 705372 | 2008 YG_{193} | — | December 21, 2008 | Kitt Peak | Spacewatch | · | 790 m | MPC · JPL |
| 705373 | 2008 YX_{196} | — | December 31, 2008 | Kitt Peak | Spacewatch | · | 1.4 km | MPC · JPL |
| 705374 | 2009 AO_{1} | — | January 3, 2009 | Great Shefford | Birtwhistle, P. | · | 1.6 km | MPC · JPL |
| 705375 | 2009 AP_{3} | — | December 21, 2008 | Catalina | CSS | · | 1.9 km | MPC · JPL |
| 705376 | 2009 AT_{3} | — | January 1, 2009 | Mount Lemmon | Mount Lemmon Survey | · | 1.5 km | MPC · JPL |
| 705377 | 2009 AX_{4} | — | January 1, 2009 | Kitt Peak | Spacewatch | · | 1.2 km | MPC · JPL |
| 705378 | 2009 AE_{9} | — | January 2, 2009 | Mount Lemmon | Mount Lemmon Survey | · | 1.6 km | MPC · JPL |
| 705379 | 2009 AM_{9} | — | May 26, 2006 | Mount Lemmon | Mount Lemmon Survey | · | 1.2 km | MPC · JPL |
| 705380 | 2009 AD_{10} | — | August 10, 2007 | Kitt Peak | Spacewatch | · | 1.3 km | MPC · JPL |
| 705381 | 2009 AC_{12} | — | January 2, 2009 | Mount Lemmon | Mount Lemmon Survey | WIT | 840 m | MPC · JPL |
| 705382 | 2009 AC_{14} | — | January 2, 2009 | Mount Lemmon | Mount Lemmon Survey | · | 1.4 km | MPC · JPL |
| 705383 | 2009 AR_{16} | — | December 21, 2008 | Catalina | CSS | · | 2.9 km | MPC · JPL |
| 705384 | 2009 AO_{19} | — | January 2, 2009 | Mount Lemmon | Mount Lemmon Survey | · | 1.5 km | MPC · JPL |
| 705385 | 2009 AX_{22} | — | January 3, 2009 | Kitt Peak | Spacewatch | · | 1.1 km | MPC · JPL |
| 705386 | 2009 AQ_{24} | — | January 3, 2009 | Kitt Peak | Spacewatch | GEF | 1.1 km | MPC · JPL |
| 705387 | 2009 AA_{29} | — | November 3, 2008 | Kitt Peak | Spacewatch | · | 1.2 km | MPC · JPL |
| 705388 | 2009 AJ_{31} | — | January 15, 2009 | Kitt Peak | Spacewatch | AGN | 1.0 km | MPC · JPL |
| 705389 | 2009 AN_{31} | — | January 15, 2009 | Kitt Peak | Spacewatch | · | 1.7 km | MPC · JPL |
| 705390 | 2009 AE_{32} | — | December 30, 2008 | Kitt Peak | Spacewatch | · | 2.5 km | MPC · JPL |
| 705391 | 2009 AR_{33} | — | December 30, 2008 | Mount Lemmon | Mount Lemmon Survey | · | 1.5 km | MPC · JPL |
| 705392 | 2009 AU_{33} | — | November 3, 2004 | Kitt Peak | Spacewatch | · | 770 m | MPC · JPL |
| 705393 | 2009 AG_{39} | — | January 15, 2009 | Kitt Peak | Spacewatch | · | 1.3 km | MPC · JPL |
| 705394 | 2009 AV_{39} | — | February 24, 2015 | Haleakala | Pan-STARRS 1 | EOS | 2.0 km | MPC · JPL |
| 705395 | 2009 AO_{42} | — | January 2, 2009 | Kitt Peak | Spacewatch | JUN | 910 m | MPC · JPL |
| 705396 | 2009 AJ_{43} | — | January 8, 2009 | Kitt Peak | Spacewatch | · | 1.3 km | MPC · JPL |
| 705397 | 2009 AA_{46} | — | January 2, 2009 | Mount Lemmon | Mount Lemmon Survey | HNS | 1.0 km | MPC · JPL |
| 705398 | 2009 AS_{52} | — | January 15, 2009 | Kitt Peak | Spacewatch | EUN | 1.1 km | MPC · JPL |
| 705399 | 2009 AH_{53} | — | May 19, 2010 | Mount Lemmon | Mount Lemmon Survey | · | 550 m | MPC · JPL |
| 705400 | 2009 AM_{53} | — | January 1, 2009 | Kitt Peak | Spacewatch | · | 1.2 km | MPC · JPL |

== 705401–705500 ==
back to top

| Designation | | | Discovery | | | Properties | | Ref |
| Permanent | Provisional | Named after | Date | Site | Discoverer(s) | Category | Diam. | Ref |
|---|---|---|---|---|---|---|---|---|
| 705401 | 2009 AZ_{54} | — | April 6, 2011 | Mount Lemmon | Mount Lemmon Survey | · | 2.6 km | MPC · JPL |
| 705402 | 2009 AH_{55} | — | April 28, 2011 | Kitt Peak | Spacewatch | LIX | 3.4 km | MPC · JPL |
| 705403 | 2009 AO_{55} | — | August 6, 2012 | Haleakala | Pan-STARRS 1 | EOS | 1.8 km | MPC · JPL |
| 705404 | 2009 AQ_{55} | — | September 10, 2007 | Mount Lemmon | Mount Lemmon Survey | · | 2.3 km | MPC · JPL |
| 705405 | 2009 AB_{56} | — | August 10, 2015 | Haleakala | Pan-STARRS 1 | · | 1.3 km | MPC · JPL |
| 705406 | 2009 AD_{56} | — | March 18, 2010 | Kitt Peak | Spacewatch | · | 1.4 km | MPC · JPL |
| 705407 | 2009 AF_{56} | — | July 9, 2015 | Haleakala | Pan-STARRS 1 | · | 1.6 km | MPC · JPL |
| 705408 | 2009 AZ_{56} | — | July 25, 2015 | Haleakala | Pan-STARRS 1 | · | 1.2 km | MPC · JPL |
| 705409 | 2009 AR_{57} | — | August 3, 2016 | Haleakala | Pan-STARRS 1 | · | 920 m | MPC · JPL |
| 705410 | 2009 AG_{62} | — | January 15, 2009 | Kitt Peak | Spacewatch | EOS | 1.7 km | MPC · JPL |
| 705411 | 2009 AS_{62} | — | January 1, 2009 | Kitt Peak | Spacewatch | · | 770 m | MPC · JPL |
| 705412 | 2009 AT_{63} | — | January 2, 2009 | Mount Lemmon | Mount Lemmon Survey | · | 1.7 km | MPC · JPL |
| 705413 | 2009 BE_{1} | — | December 30, 2008 | Mount Lemmon | Mount Lemmon Survey | · | 1.2 km | MPC · JPL |
| 705414 | 2009 BA_{3} | — | January 16, 2004 | Palomar | NEAT | · | 3.0 km | MPC · JPL |
| 705415 | 2009 BV_{3} | — | January 3, 2009 | Mount Lemmon | Mount Lemmon Survey | · | 890 m | MPC · JPL |
| 705416 | 2009 BC_{4} | — | January 18, 2009 | Socorro | LINEAR | · | 1.3 km | MPC · JPL |
| 705417 | 2009 BK_{12} | — | April 9, 2005 | Mount Lemmon | Mount Lemmon Survey | · | 1.4 km | MPC · JPL |
| 705418 | 2009 BJ_{14} | — | January 25, 2009 | Kitt Peak | Spacewatch | · | 1.6 km | MPC · JPL |
| 705419 | 2009 BL_{21} | — | January 16, 2009 | Mount Lemmon | Mount Lemmon Survey | · | 1.6 km | MPC · JPL |
| 705420 | 2009 BB_{28} | — | September 13, 2007 | Mount Lemmon | Mount Lemmon Survey | AGN | 800 m | MPC · JPL |
| 705421 | 2009 BZ_{29} | — | January 16, 2009 | Kitt Peak | Spacewatch | · | 2.8 km | MPC · JPL |
| 705422 | 2009 BJ_{30} | — | January 16, 2009 | Kitt Peak | Spacewatch | · | 2.3 km | MPC · JPL |
| 705423 | 2009 BH_{31} | — | January 16, 2009 | Kitt Peak | Spacewatch | MIS | 2.2 km | MPC · JPL |
| 705424 | 2009 BZ_{33} | — | November 23, 2008 | Mount Lemmon | Mount Lemmon Survey | EOS | 1.8 km | MPC · JPL |
| 705425 | 2009 BO_{47} | — | January 16, 2009 | Mount Lemmon | Mount Lemmon Survey | · | 1.1 km | MPC · JPL |
| 705426 | 2009 BZ_{53} | — | January 16, 2009 | Mount Lemmon | Mount Lemmon Survey | EUN | 1.1 km | MPC · JPL |
| 705427 | 2009 BK_{60} | — | January 18, 2009 | Catalina | CSS | · | 3.1 km | MPC · JPL |
| 705428 | 2009 BR_{66} | — | January 20, 2009 | Kitt Peak | Spacewatch | V | 440 m | MPC · JPL |
| 705429 | 2009 BS_{66} | — | January 16, 2009 | Kitt Peak | Spacewatch | LIX | 3.2 km | MPC · JPL |
| 705430 | 2009 BD_{67} | — | January 20, 2009 | Kitt Peak | Spacewatch | · | 1.3 km | MPC · JPL |
| 705431 | 2009 BD_{68} | — | January 20, 2009 | Kitt Peak | Spacewatch | · | 1.3 km | MPC · JPL |
| 705432 | 2009 BX_{69} | — | January 1, 2009 | Mount Lemmon | Mount Lemmon Survey | · | 3.0 km | MPC · JPL |
| 705433 | 2009 BG_{70} | — | November 24, 2008 | Mount Lemmon | Mount Lemmon Survey | · | 2.6 km | MPC · JPL |
| 705434 | 2009 BM_{95} | — | January 26, 2009 | Mount Lemmon | Mount Lemmon Survey | HNS | 1.2 km | MPC · JPL |
| 705435 | 2009 BD_{96} | — | January 29, 2009 | Kitt Peak | Spacewatch | · | 1.4 km | MPC · JPL |
| 705436 | 2009 BG_{99} | — | December 29, 2008 | Mount Lemmon | Mount Lemmon Survey | · | 1.5 km | MPC · JPL |
| 705437 | 2009 BU_{113} | — | January 1, 2009 | Kitt Peak | Spacewatch | · | 690 m | MPC · JPL |
| 705438 | 2009 BF_{114} | — | February 14, 2005 | Kitt Peak | Spacewatch | · | 1.9 km | MPC · JPL |
| 705439 | 2009 BL_{115} | — | September 19, 2007 | Kitt Peak | Spacewatch | · | 1.3 km | MPC · JPL |
| 705440 | 2009 BB_{116} | — | January 2, 2009 | Mount Lemmon | Mount Lemmon Survey | EUN | 1.2 km | MPC · JPL |
| 705441 | 2009 BA_{119} | — | April 5, 2003 | Kitt Peak | Spacewatch | · | 610 m | MPC · JPL |
| 705442 | 2009 BT_{120} | — | January 31, 2009 | Kitt Peak | Spacewatch | V | 390 m | MPC · JPL |
| 705443 | 2009 BJ_{122} | — | January 20, 2009 | Kitt Peak | Spacewatch | · | 1.6 km | MPC · JPL |
| 705444 | 2009 BS_{124} | — | January 31, 2009 | Kitt Peak | Spacewatch | · | 1.5 km | MPC · JPL |
| 705445 | 2009 BO_{132} | — | January 30, 2009 | Mount Lemmon | Mount Lemmon Survey | · | 1.0 km | MPC · JPL |
| 705446 | 2009 BC_{134} | — | January 15, 2009 | Kitt Peak | Spacewatch | · | 1.5 km | MPC · JPL |
| 705447 | 2009 BG_{134} | — | January 29, 2009 | Kitt Peak | Spacewatch | · | 1.2 km | MPC · JPL |
| 705448 | 2009 BM_{137} | — | January 29, 2009 | Kitt Peak | Spacewatch | · | 1.2 km | MPC · JPL |
| 705449 | 2009 BB_{139} | — | January 29, 2009 | Kitt Peak | Spacewatch | · | 780 m | MPC · JPL |
| 705450 | 2009 BS_{150} | — | January 27, 2009 | XuYi | PMO NEO Survey Program | · | 1.8 km | MPC · JPL |
| 705451 | 2009 BU_{153} | — | January 20, 2009 | Kitt Peak | Spacewatch | · | 1.4 km | MPC · JPL |
| 705452 | 2009 BL_{154} | — | January 20, 2009 | Kitt Peak | Spacewatch | · | 1.4 km | MPC · JPL |
| 705453 | 2009 BS_{155} | — | March 17, 2004 | Mauna Kea | D. D. Balam | · | 2.6 km | MPC · JPL |
| 705454 | 2009 BY_{162} | — | September 11, 2007 | Mount Lemmon | Mount Lemmon Survey | MRX | 1.0 km | MPC · JPL |
| 705455 | 2009 BS_{164} | — | January 20, 2009 | Kitt Peak | Spacewatch | · | 1.8 km | MPC · JPL |
| 705456 | 2009 BW_{164} | — | January 31, 2009 | Kitt Peak | Spacewatch | · | 700 m | MPC · JPL |
| 705457 | 2009 BE_{166} | — | May 23, 2001 | Cerro Tololo | Deep Ecliptic Survey | · | 1.5 km | MPC · JPL |
| 705458 | 2009 BN_{179} | — | December 1, 2008 | Mount Lemmon | Mount Lemmon Survey | · | 1.3 km | MPC · JPL |
| 705459 | 2009 BT_{180} | — | January 31, 2009 | Mount Lemmon | Mount Lemmon Survey | (194) | 1.4 km | MPC · JPL |
| 705460 | 2009 BL_{193} | — | January 31, 2009 | Kitt Peak | Spacewatch | · | 770 m | MPC · JPL |
| 705461 | 2009 BP_{193} | — | April 15, 2010 | Kitt Peak | Spacewatch | EUN | 1.0 km | MPC · JPL |
| 705462 | 2009 BS_{193} | — | December 4, 2013 | Haleakala | Pan-STARRS 1 | · | 2.1 km | MPC · JPL |
| 705463 | 2009 BV_{193} | — | December 26, 2008 | Calar Alto | F. Hormuth | · | 580 m | MPC · JPL |
| 705464 | 2009 BW_{193} | — | May 12, 2011 | Mount Lemmon | Mount Lemmon Survey | · | 3.3 km | MPC · JPL |
| 705465 | 2009 BX_{193} | — | August 27, 2011 | Haleakala | Pan-STARRS 1 | · | 580 m | MPC · JPL |
| 705466 | 2009 BC_{194} | — | July 26, 2015 | Haleakala | Pan-STARRS 1 | · | 1.5 km | MPC · JPL |
| 705467 | 2009 BG_{194} | — | January 25, 2014 | Haleakala | Pan-STARRS 1 | · | 1.9 km | MPC · JPL |
| 705468 | 2009 BJ_{194} | — | January 20, 2009 | Kitt Peak | Spacewatch | NEM | 1.9 km | MPC · JPL |
| 705469 | 2009 BN_{194} | — | January 20, 2009 | Mount Lemmon | Mount Lemmon Survey | · | 1.3 km | MPC · JPL |
| 705470 | 2009 BO_{194} | — | January 26, 2009 | Mount Lemmon | Mount Lemmon Survey | · | 3.0 km | MPC · JPL |
| 705471 | 2009 BE_{195} | — | September 6, 2013 | Kitt Peak | Spacewatch | · | 2.9 km | MPC · JPL |
| 705472 | 2009 BK_{195} | — | September 19, 2011 | Haleakala | Pan-STARRS 1 | · | 1.2 km | MPC · JPL |
| 705473 | 2009 BL_{195} | — | January 25, 2009 | Kitt Peak | Spacewatch | · | 2.1 km | MPC · JPL |
| 705474 | 2009 BM_{195} | — | January 20, 2009 | Kitt Peak | Spacewatch | · | 1.6 km | MPC · JPL |
| 705475 | 2009 BP_{195} | — | September 30, 2016 | Haleakala | Pan-STARRS 1 | EUN | 1.1 km | MPC · JPL |
| 705476 | 2009 BS_{196} | — | September 25, 2016 | Haleakala | Pan-STARRS 1 | · | 1.2 km | MPC · JPL |
| 705477 | 2009 BM_{197} | — | January 3, 2013 | Haleakala | Pan-STARRS 1 | · | 1.2 km | MPC · JPL |
| 705478 | 2009 BF_{199} | — | December 25, 2017 | Haleakala | Pan-STARRS 1 | · | 1.3 km | MPC · JPL |
| 705479 | 2009 BJ_{199} | — | March 21, 2015 | Haleakala | Pan-STARRS 1 | · | 2.0 km | MPC · JPL |
| 705480 | 2009 BA_{200} | — | January 15, 2015 | Mount Lemmon | Mount Lemmon Survey | THM | 2.1 km | MPC · JPL |
| 705481 | 2009 BK_{201} | — | January 18, 2016 | Mount Lemmon | Mount Lemmon Survey | · | 520 m | MPC · JPL |
| 705482 | 2009 BV_{203} | — | February 5, 2016 | Haleakala | Pan-STARRS 1 | EOS | 1.9 km | MPC · JPL |
| 705483 | 2009 BK_{204} | — | January 16, 2009 | Mount Lemmon | Mount Lemmon Survey | · | 1.1 km | MPC · JPL |
| 705484 | 2009 BA_{205} | — | January 20, 2009 | Mount Lemmon | Mount Lemmon Survey | · | 1.1 km | MPC · JPL |
| 705485 | 2009 BD_{205} | — | January 16, 2009 | Kitt Peak | Spacewatch | · | 2.5 km | MPC · JPL |
| 705486 | 2009 BP_{205} | — | January 25, 2009 | Kitt Peak | Spacewatch | · | 2.3 km | MPC · JPL |
| 705487 | 2009 BV_{205} | — | January 20, 2009 | Kitt Peak | Spacewatch | EOS | 1.6 km | MPC · JPL |
| 705488 | 2009 BK_{207} | — | January 18, 2009 | Kitt Peak | Spacewatch | · | 1.5 km | MPC · JPL |
| 705489 | 2009 BS_{207} | — | January 30, 2009 | Mount Lemmon | Mount Lemmon Survey | · | 1.7 km | MPC · JPL |
| 705490 | 2009 BG_{208} | — | January 20, 2009 | Kitt Peak | Spacewatch | · | 1.3 km | MPC · JPL |
| 705491 | 2009 BD_{210} | — | January 20, 2009 | Kitt Peak | Spacewatch | · | 1.3 km | MPC · JPL |
| 705492 | 2009 BP_{210} | — | January 20, 2009 | Mount Lemmon | Mount Lemmon Survey | · | 1.2 km | MPC · JPL |
| 705493 | 2009 BW_{213} | — | January 18, 2009 | Kitt Peak | Spacewatch | AGN | 880 m | MPC · JPL |
| 705494 | 2009 BJ_{215} | — | January 25, 2009 | Kitt Peak | Spacewatch | HOF | 1.9 km | MPC · JPL |
| 705495 | 2009 BE_{216} | — | January 14, 2016 | Haleakala | Pan-STARRS 1 | · | 2.7 km | MPC · JPL |
| 705496 | 2009 CA_{8} | — | January 18, 2009 | Mount Lemmon | Mount Lemmon Survey | EOS | 1.8 km | MPC · JPL |
| 705497 | 2009 CQ_{8} | — | January 2, 2009 | Kitt Peak | Spacewatch | · | 1.4 km | MPC · JPL |
| 705498 | 2009 CT_{14} | — | February 1, 2009 | Kitt Peak | Spacewatch | NEM | 1.9 km | MPC · JPL |
| 705499 | 2009 CG_{16} | — | February 1, 2009 | Mount Lemmon | Mount Lemmon Survey | · | 1.7 km | MPC · JPL |
| 705500 | 2009 CK_{16} | — | February 1, 2009 | Mount Lemmon | Mount Lemmon Survey | · | 870 m | MPC · JPL |

== 705501–705600 ==
back to top

| Designation | | | Discovery | | | Properties | | Ref |
| Permanent | Provisional | Named after | Date | Site | Discoverer(s) | Category | Diam. | Ref |
|---|---|---|---|---|---|---|---|---|
| 705501 | 2009 CL_{19} | — | February 3, 2009 | Mount Lemmon | Mount Lemmon Survey | · | 1.8 km | MPC · JPL |
| 705502 | 2009 CD_{31} | — | February 1, 2009 | Kitt Peak | Spacewatch | · | 520 m | MPC · JPL |
| 705503 | 2009 CC_{33} | — | February 1, 2009 | Kitt Peak | Spacewatch | · | 1.8 km | MPC · JPL |
| 705504 | 2009 CH_{34} | — | January 2, 2009 | Mount Lemmon | Mount Lemmon Survey | · | 3.4 km | MPC · JPL |
| 705505 | 2009 CV_{34} | — | February 2, 2009 | Mount Lemmon | Mount Lemmon Survey | · | 1.0 km | MPC · JPL |
| 705506 | 2009 CS_{42} | — | January 2, 2009 | Kitt Peak | Spacewatch | · | 540 m | MPC · JPL |
| 705507 | 2009 CC_{47} | — | January 16, 2009 | Mount Lemmon | Mount Lemmon Survey | GAL | 1.5 km | MPC · JPL |
| 705508 | 2009 CT_{51} | — | February 4, 2009 | Mount Lemmon | Mount Lemmon Survey | · | 1.4 km | MPC · JPL |
| 705509 | 2009 CS_{53} | — | October 8, 2007 | Catalina | CSS | · | 3.9 km | MPC · JPL |
| 705510 | 2009 CB_{54} | — | February 13, 2009 | Kitt Peak | Spacewatch | JUN | 750 m | MPC · JPL |
| 705511 | 2009 CX_{54} | — | February 14, 2009 | Mount Lemmon | Mount Lemmon Survey | · | 2.2 km | MPC · JPL |
| 705512 | 2009 CE_{61} | — | January 29, 2009 | Mount Lemmon | Mount Lemmon Survey | · | 600 m | MPC · JPL |
| 705513 | 2009 CD_{68} | — | January 29, 2009 | Kitt Peak | Spacewatch | · | 1.6 km | MPC · JPL |
| 705514 | 2009 CJ_{68} | — | February 3, 2009 | Mount Lemmon | Mount Lemmon Survey | ERI | 1.2 km | MPC · JPL |
| 705515 | 2009 CO_{68} | — | February 1, 2009 | Mount Lemmon | Mount Lemmon Survey | · | 1.4 km | MPC · JPL |
| 705516 | 2009 CW_{68} | — | February 24, 2015 | Haleakala | Pan-STARRS 1 | · | 2.4 km | MPC · JPL |
| 705517 | 2009 CY_{68} | — | February 5, 2009 | Kitt Peak | Spacewatch | · | 2.2 km | MPC · JPL |
| 705518 | 2009 CD_{69} | — | February 14, 2009 | Mount Lemmon | Mount Lemmon Survey | · | 1.6 km | MPC · JPL |
| 705519 | 2009 CJ_{69} | — | February 1, 2009 | Kitt Peak | Spacewatch | EOS | 1.7 km | MPC · JPL |
| 705520 | 2009 CR_{69} | — | October 10, 2012 | Mount Lemmon | Mount Lemmon Survey | EOS | 1.8 km | MPC · JPL |
| 705521 | 2009 CX_{69} | — | November 24, 2011 | Mount Lemmon | Mount Lemmon Survey | · | 700 m | MPC · JPL |
| 705522 | 2009 CH_{70} | — | February 2, 2009 | Kitt Peak | Spacewatch | · | 2.2 km | MPC · JPL |
| 705523 | 2009 CN_{70} | — | April 5, 2014 | Haleakala | Pan-STARRS 1 | NEM | 1.7 km | MPC · JPL |
| 705524 | 2009 CE_{71} | — | February 3, 2009 | Kitt Peak | Spacewatch | · | 520 m | MPC · JPL |
| 705525 | 2009 CN_{71} | — | September 22, 2016 | Mount Lemmon | Mount Lemmon Survey | GEF | 1.0 km | MPC · JPL |
| 705526 | 2009 CY_{72} | — | December 23, 2017 | Haleakala | Pan-STARRS 1 | AGN | 920 m | MPC · JPL |
| 705527 | 2009 CB_{73} | — | January 15, 2018 | Mount Lemmon | Mount Lemmon Survey | · | 1.4 km | MPC · JPL |
| 705528 | 2009 CQ_{73} | — | June 28, 2015 | Haleakala | Pan-STARRS 1 | · | 1.5 km | MPC · JPL |
| 705529 | 2009 CR_{73} | — | July 28, 2011 | Haleakala | Pan-STARRS 1 | · | 2.7 km | MPC · JPL |
| 705530 | 2009 CY_{73} | — | December 18, 2014 | Haleakala | Pan-STARRS 1 | · | 1.9 km | MPC · JPL |
| 705531 | 2009 CQ_{75} | — | February 1, 2009 | Mount Lemmon | Mount Lemmon Survey | · | 870 m | MPC · JPL |
| 705532 | 2009 CN_{76} | — | February 1, 2009 | Mount Lemmon | Mount Lemmon Survey | · | 1.6 km | MPC · JPL |
| 705533 | 2009 CW_{76} | — | February 1, 2009 | Kitt Peak | Spacewatch | · | 1.7 km | MPC · JPL |
| 705534 | 2009 CQ_{77} | — | February 3, 2009 | Mount Lemmon | Mount Lemmon Survey | · | 1.2 km | MPC · JPL |
| 705535 | 2009 CO_{78} | — | February 1, 2009 | Kitt Peak | Spacewatch | · | 2.1 km | MPC · JPL |
| 705536 | 2009 CG_{79} | — | February 1, 2009 | Kitt Peak | Spacewatch | · | 1.5 km | MPC · JPL |
| 705537 | 2009 CN_{79} | — | February 1, 2009 | Kitt Peak | Spacewatch | · | 1.3 km | MPC · JPL |
| 705538 | 2009 DR_{1} | — | February 3, 2009 | Mount Lemmon | Mount Lemmon Survey | (5) | 1.1 km | MPC · JPL |
| 705539 | 2009 DL_{15} | — | February 16, 2009 | La Sagra | OAM | · | 1.9 km | MPC · JPL |
| 705540 | 2009 DJ_{19} | — | February 20, 2009 | Kitt Peak | Spacewatch | · | 560 m | MPC · JPL |
| 705541 | 2009 DT_{22} | — | February 19, 2009 | Kitt Peak | Spacewatch | · | 1.7 km | MPC · JPL |
| 705542 | 2009 DV_{23} | — | February 20, 2009 | Catalina | CSS | JUN | 1.0 km | MPC · JPL |
| 705543 | 2009 DZ_{25} | — | February 21, 2009 | Mount Lemmon | Mount Lemmon Survey | · | 1.5 km | MPC · JPL |
| 705544 | 2009 DU_{26} | — | February 19, 2009 | Kitt Peak | Spacewatch | · | 2.4 km | MPC · JPL |
| 705545 | 2009 DT_{27} | — | February 22, 2009 | Calar Alto | F. Hormuth | · | 770 m | MPC · JPL |
| 705546 | 2009 DE_{29} | — | February 23, 2009 | Calar Alto | F. Hormuth | · | 1.4 km | MPC · JPL |
| 705547 | 2009 DU_{32} | — | February 20, 2009 | Kitt Peak | Spacewatch | NYS | 890 m | MPC · JPL |
| 705548 | 2009 DQ_{33} | — | January 31, 2009 | Mount Lemmon | Mount Lemmon Survey | · | 1.7 km | MPC · JPL |
| 705549 | 2009 DU_{36} | — | February 23, 2009 | Calar Alto | F. Hormuth | V | 410 m | MPC · JPL |
| 705550 | 2009 DP_{37} | — | January 17, 2009 | Kitt Peak | Spacewatch | · | 1.6 km | MPC · JPL |
| 705551 | 2009 DD_{40} | — | February 20, 2009 | Dauban | C. Rinner, Kugel, F. | · | 2.8 km | MPC · JPL |
| 705552 | 2009 DT_{40} | — | December 22, 2008 | Mount Lemmon | Mount Lemmon Survey | (5) | 1.1 km | MPC · JPL |
| 705553 | 2009 DC_{49} | — | February 19, 2009 | Kitt Peak | Spacewatch | · | 680 m | MPC · JPL |
| 705554 | 2009 DV_{57} | — | October 29, 2003 | Kitt Peak | Spacewatch | (5) | 1.2 km | MPC · JPL |
| 705555 | 2009 DN_{60} | — | February 22, 2009 | Kitt Peak | Spacewatch | V | 460 m | MPC · JPL |
| 705556 | 2009 DJ_{62} | — | February 22, 2009 | Mount Lemmon | Mount Lemmon Survey | HOF | 2.0 km | MPC · JPL |
| 705557 | 2009 DK_{67} | — | February 21, 2009 | Kitt Peak | Spacewatch | · | 1.4 km | MPC · JPL |
| 705558 | 2009 DT_{70} | — | November 8, 2007 | Mount Lemmon | Mount Lemmon Survey | · | 1.8 km | MPC · JPL |
| 705559 | 2009 DJ_{79} | — | February 21, 2009 | Kitt Peak | Spacewatch | · | 1.5 km | MPC · JPL |
| 705560 | 2009 DL_{79} | — | February 21, 2009 | Kitt Peak | Spacewatch | · | 1.7 km | MPC · JPL |
| 705561 | 2009 DR_{84} | — | November 2, 2007 | Catalina | CSS | · | 2.9 km | MPC · JPL |
| 705562 | 2009 DW_{84} | — | February 26, 2009 | Kitt Peak | Spacewatch | · | 1.4 km | MPC · JPL |
| 705563 | 2009 DF_{88} | — | February 2, 2009 | Moletai | K. Černis, Zdanavicius, J. | MRX | 800 m | MPC · JPL |
| 705564 | 2009 DT_{96} | — | October 8, 2007 | Mount Lemmon | Mount Lemmon Survey | (17392) | 1.1 km | MPC · JPL |
| 705565 | 2009 DY_{96} | — | February 26, 2009 | Kitt Peak | Spacewatch | · | 790 m | MPC · JPL |
| 705566 | 2009 DG_{99} | — | February 26, 2009 | Mount Lemmon | Mount Lemmon Survey | · | 1.4 km | MPC · JPL |
| 705567 | 2009 DZ_{100} | — | February 26, 2009 | Kitt Peak | Spacewatch | · | 1.6 km | MPC · JPL |
| 705568 | 2009 DQ_{101} | — | February 26, 2009 | Kitt Peak | Spacewatch | · | 1.8 km | MPC · JPL |
| 705569 | 2009 DY_{103} | — | February 26, 2009 | Mount Lemmon | Mount Lemmon Survey | · | 1.7 km | MPC · JPL |
| 705570 | 2009 DS_{106} | — | February 27, 2009 | Kitt Peak | Spacewatch | · | 990 m | MPC · JPL |
| 705571 | 2009 DD_{107} | — | February 28, 2009 | Kitt Peak | Spacewatch | · | 2.5 km | MPC · JPL |
| 705572 | 2009 DD_{108} | — | November 2, 2000 | Kitt Peak | Spacewatch | · | 890 m | MPC · JPL |
| 705573 | 2009 DQ_{108} | — | February 24, 2009 | Mount Lemmon | Mount Lemmon Survey | · | 520 m | MPC · JPL |
| 705574 | 2009 DP_{110} | — | December 31, 2008 | Mount Lemmon | Mount Lemmon Survey | H | 500 m | MPC · JPL |
| 705575 | 2009 DU_{110} | — | December 21, 2012 | Piszkéstető | K. Sárneczky, Hodosan, G. | · | 1.2 km | MPC · JPL |
| 705576 | 2009 DZ_{113} | — | February 27, 2009 | Mount Lemmon | Mount Lemmon Survey | · | 510 m | MPC · JPL |
| 705577 | 2009 DC_{119} | — | February 1, 2009 | Kitt Peak | Spacewatch | · | 1.9 km | MPC · JPL |
| 705578 | 2009 DJ_{119} | — | October 20, 2007 | Mount Lemmon | Mount Lemmon Survey | · | 1.3 km | MPC · JPL |
| 705579 | 2009 DK_{123} | — | February 24, 2009 | Catalina | CSS | H | 570 m | MPC · JPL |
| 705580 | 2009 DQ_{123} | — | January 26, 2009 | Mount Lemmon | Mount Lemmon Survey | · | 1.9 km | MPC · JPL |
| 705581 | 2009 DY_{123} | — | February 19, 2009 | Kitt Peak | Spacewatch | DOR | 1.9 km | MPC · JPL |
| 705582 | 2009 DP_{147} | — | October 7, 2016 | Mount Lemmon | Mount Lemmon Survey | HNS | 1.0 km | MPC · JPL |
| 705583 | 2009 DC_{148} | — | February 26, 2009 | Kitt Peak | Spacewatch | · | 2.5 km | MPC · JPL |
| 705584 | 2009 DD_{149} | — | February 20, 2009 | Kitt Peak | Spacewatch | · | 1.1 km | MPC · JPL |
| 705585 | 2009 DD_{151} | — | February 28, 2009 | Mount Lemmon | Mount Lemmon Survey | · | 1.6 km | MPC · JPL |
| 705586 | 2009 DH_{151} | — | September 24, 2012 | Mount Lemmon | Mount Lemmon Survey | · | 3.1 km | MPC · JPL |
| 705587 | 2009 DR_{151} | — | June 19, 2010 | Mount Lemmon | Mount Lemmon Survey | · | 820 m | MPC · JPL |
| 705588 | 2009 DZ_{152} | — | February 22, 2009 | Kitt Peak | Spacewatch | AGN | 920 m | MPC · JPL |
| 705589 | 2009 DV_{153} | — | February 28, 2009 | Kitt Peak | Spacewatch | · | 2.7 km | MPC · JPL |
| 705590 | 2009 DY_{155} | — | February 20, 2009 | Mount Lemmon | Mount Lemmon Survey | · | 620 m | MPC · JPL |
| 705591 | 2009 DX_{156} | — | February 19, 2009 | Kitt Peak | Spacewatch | MRX | 700 m | MPC · JPL |
| 705592 | 2009 DE_{158} | — | February 28, 2009 | Mount Lemmon | Mount Lemmon Survey | · | 2.7 km | MPC · JPL |
| 705593 | 2009 DG_{158} | — | February 28, 2009 | Mount Lemmon | Mount Lemmon Survey | · | 1.4 km | MPC · JPL |
| 705594 | 2009 EJ_{2} | — | March 1, 2009 | Kitt Peak | Spacewatch | · | 2.0 km | MPC · JPL |
| 705595 | 2009 EY_{3} | — | March 1, 2009 | Kitt Peak | Spacewatch | · | 1.4 km | MPC · JPL |
| 705596 | 2009 EO_{7} | — | March 2, 2009 | Kitt Peak | Spacewatch | · | 720 m | MPC · JPL |
| 705597 | 2009 EK_{8} | — | March 2, 2009 | Mount Lemmon | Mount Lemmon Survey | · | 1.7 km | MPC · JPL |
| 705598 | 2009 EG_{10} | — | February 1, 2009 | Kitt Peak | Spacewatch | AGN | 880 m | MPC · JPL |
| 705599 | 2009 EO_{12} | — | March 31, 2014 | Mount Lemmon | Mount Lemmon Survey | DOR | 2.0 km | MPC · JPL |
| 705600 | 2009 EH_{13} | — | February 2, 2009 | Catalina | CSS | · | 1.0 km | MPC · JPL |

== 705601–705700 ==
back to top

| Designation | | | Discovery | | | Properties | | Ref |
| Permanent | Provisional | Named after | Date | Site | Discoverer(s) | Category | Diam. | Ref |
|---|---|---|---|---|---|---|---|---|
| 705601 | 2009 EQ_{15} | — | March 3, 2009 | Kitt Peak | Spacewatch | GEF | 1.1 km | MPC · JPL |
| 705602 | 2009 ET_{17} | — | February 19, 2009 | Kitt Peak | Spacewatch | MAR | 970 m | MPC · JPL |
| 705603 | 2009 ES_{31} | — | July 24, 2015 | Haleakala | Pan-STARRS 1 | · | 1.4 km | MPC · JPL |
| 705604 | 2009 EL_{33} | — | March 3, 2009 | Mount Lemmon | Mount Lemmon Survey | · | 1.4 km | MPC · JPL |
| 705605 | 2009 EF_{34} | — | March 2, 2009 | Kitt Peak | Spacewatch | · | 1.5 km | MPC · JPL |
| 705606 | 2009 EX_{34} | — | October 6, 2012 | Haleakala | Pan-STARRS 1 | · | 2.4 km | MPC · JPL |
| 705607 | 2009 ET_{35} | — | March 3, 2009 | Mount Lemmon | Mount Lemmon Survey | MAR | 830 m | MPC · JPL |
| 705608 | 2009 EF_{36} | — | March 2, 2009 | Mount Lemmon | Mount Lemmon Survey | · | 640 m | MPC · JPL |
| 705609 | 2009 EK_{36} | — | February 5, 2013 | Kitt Peak | Spacewatch | EUN | 1.1 km | MPC · JPL |
| 705610 | 2009 EY_{36} | — | March 3, 2009 | Catalina | CSS | INA | 2.8 km | MPC · JPL |
| 705611 | 2009 EL_{37} | — | April 5, 2014 | Haleakala | Pan-STARRS 1 | · | 1.4 km | MPC · JPL |
| 705612 | 2009 ET_{38} | — | March 2, 2009 | Mount Lemmon | Mount Lemmon Survey | · | 1.7 km | MPC · JPL |
| 705613 | 2009 EV_{38} | — | March 1, 2009 | Kitt Peak | Spacewatch | · | 2.7 km | MPC · JPL |
| 705614 | 2009 EK_{40} | — | March 3, 2009 | Mount Lemmon | Mount Lemmon Survey | · | 1.6 km | MPC · JPL |
| 705615 | 2009 EK_{41} | — | March 3, 2009 | Kitt Peak | Spacewatch | · | 1.5 km | MPC · JPL |
| 705616 | 2009 EY_{42} | — | March 3, 2009 | Kitt Peak | Spacewatch | · | 1.3 km | MPC · JPL |
| 705617 | 2009 FX_{9} | — | February 27, 2009 | Kitt Peak | Spacewatch | · | 760 m | MPC · JPL |
| 705618 | 2009 FE_{12} | — | March 3, 2009 | Mount Lemmon | Mount Lemmon Survey | AGN | 920 m | MPC · JPL |
| 705619 | 2009 FF_{14} | — | March 18, 2009 | Taunus | E. Schwab, R. Kling | · | 2.4 km | MPC · JPL |
| 705620 | 2009 FU_{19} | — | February 28, 2009 | Kitt Peak | Spacewatch | · | 2.6 km | MPC · JPL |
| 705621 | 2009 FT_{29} | — | March 25, 2009 | Haleakala | M. Micheli | · | 1.4 km | MPC · JPL |
| 705622 | 2009 FO_{33} | — | February 1, 2009 | Kitt Peak | Spacewatch | · | 1.1 km | MPC · JPL |
| 705623 | 2009 FE_{37} | — | March 24, 2009 | Mount Lemmon | Mount Lemmon Survey | · | 490 m | MPC · JPL |
| 705624 | 2009 FW_{41} | — | March 26, 2009 | Mount Lemmon | Mount Lemmon Survey | HOF | 2.1 km | MPC · JPL |
| 705625 | 2009 FB_{48} | — | March 21, 2009 | Mount Lemmon | Mount Lemmon Survey | · | 1.9 km | MPC · JPL |
| 705626 | 2009 FS_{49} | — | March 1, 2009 | Kitt Peak | Spacewatch | · | 710 m | MPC · JPL |
| 705627 | 2009 FB_{53} | — | February 21, 2009 | Kitt Peak | Spacewatch | · | 2.2 km | MPC · JPL |
| 705628 | 2009 FP_{59} | — | March 7, 2009 | Siding Spring | SSS | PHO | 750 m | MPC · JPL |
| 705629 | 2009 FA_{67} | — | October 17, 2010 | Mount Lemmon | Mount Lemmon Survey | · | 1.0 km | MPC · JPL |
| 705630 | 2009 FB_{82} | — | March 31, 2009 | Kitt Peak | Spacewatch | · | 570 m | MPC · JPL |
| 705631 | 2009 FN_{82} | — | February 21, 2009 | Kitt Peak | Spacewatch | · | 800 m | MPC · JPL |
| 705632 | 2009 FR_{82} | — | May 26, 2014 | Haleakala | Pan-STARRS 1 | EUN | 950 m | MPC · JPL |
| 705633 | 2009 FY_{82} | — | April 18, 2013 | Kitt Peak | Spacewatch | · | 1.3 km | MPC · JPL |
| 705634 | 2009 FZ_{82} | — | July 27, 2013 | Siding Spring | SSS | ERI | 1.2 km | MPC · JPL |
| 705635 | 2009 FG_{83} | — | March 25, 2014 | Catalina | CSS | · | 1.8 km | MPC · JPL |
| 705636 | 2009 FN_{83} | — | March 19, 2009 | Kitt Peak | Spacewatch | MRX | 1.0 km | MPC · JPL |
| 705637 | 2009 FT_{83} | — | January 23, 2015 | Haleakala | Pan-STARRS 1 | · | 2.3 km | MPC · JPL |
| 705638 | 2009 FV_{83} | — | December 27, 2011 | Mount Lemmon | Mount Lemmon Survey | · | 830 m | MPC · JPL |
| 705639 | 2009 FC_{84} | — | February 28, 2009 | Kitt Peak | Spacewatch | MAS | 520 m | MPC · JPL |
| 705640 | 2009 FP_{84} | — | March 16, 2009 | Kitt Peak | Spacewatch | · | 1.7 km | MPC · JPL |
| 705641 | 2009 FH_{86} | — | March 26, 2009 | Kitt Peak | Spacewatch | · | 1.7 km | MPC · JPL |
| 705642 | 2009 FK_{86} | — | March 19, 2009 | Kitt Peak | Spacewatch | · | 1.7 km | MPC · JPL |
| 705643 | 2009 FA_{87} | — | February 9, 2014 | Mount Lemmon | Mount Lemmon Survey | · | 2.1 km | MPC · JPL |
| 705644 | 2009 FP_{89} | — | March 18, 2009 | Mount Lemmon | Mount Lemmon Survey | NYS | 690 m | MPC · JPL |
| 705645 | 2009 FG_{91} | — | March 18, 2009 | Kitt Peak | Spacewatch | · | 860 m | MPC · JPL |
| 705646 | 2009 FY_{91} | — | March 16, 2009 | Mount Lemmon | Mount Lemmon Survey | · | 540 m | MPC · JPL |
| 705647 | 2009 FB_{92} | — | March 24, 2009 | Mount Lemmon | Mount Lemmon Survey | · | 1.7 km | MPC · JPL |
| 705648 | 2009 GT_{6} | — | April 2, 2009 | Kitt Peak | Spacewatch | · | 720 m | MPC · JPL |
| 705649 | 2009 GA_{7} | — | February 8, 2014 | Mount Lemmon | Mount Lemmon Survey | · | 2.0 km | MPC · JPL |
| 705650 | 2009 GD_{7} | — | April 24, 2014 | Haleakala | Pan-STARRS 1 | · | 330 m | MPC · JPL |
| 705651 | 2009 GE_{8} | — | October 28, 2017 | Mount Lemmon | Mount Lemmon Survey | · | 620 m | MPC · JPL |
| 705652 | 2009 HM_{5} | — | August 15, 2006 | Lulin | LUSS | · | 790 m | MPC · JPL |
| 705653 | 2009 HH_{10} | — | April 18, 2009 | Kitt Peak | Spacewatch | · | 1.6 km | MPC · JPL |
| 705654 | 2009 HL_{11} | — | April 18, 2009 | Mount Lemmon | Mount Lemmon Survey | · | 1.5 km | MPC · JPL |
| 705655 | 2009 HC_{19} | — | April 19, 2009 | Mount Lemmon | Mount Lemmon Survey | VER | 2.4 km | MPC · JPL |
| 705656 | 2009 HK_{19} | — | April 19, 2009 | Mount Lemmon | Mount Lemmon Survey | AST | 1.6 km | MPC · JPL |
| 705657 | 2009 HY_{23} | — | April 17, 2009 | Kitt Peak | Spacewatch | · | 1.7 km | MPC · JPL |
| 705658 | 2009 HA_{25} | — | April 17, 2009 | Kitt Peak | Spacewatch | · | 750 m | MPC · JPL |
| 705659 | 2009 HJ_{26} | — | October 1, 2006 | Kitt Peak | Spacewatch | · | 2.0 km | MPC · JPL |
| 705660 | 2009 HN_{30} | — | April 19, 2009 | Kitt Peak | Spacewatch | · | 1.6 km | MPC · JPL |
| 705661 | 2009 HB_{31} | — | April 2, 2009 | Mount Lemmon | Mount Lemmon Survey | · | 740 m | MPC · JPL |
| 705662 | 2009 HQ_{35} | — | April 20, 2009 | Kitt Peak | Spacewatch | L5 | 7.9 km | MPC · JPL |
| 705663 | 2009 HV_{37} | — | March 24, 2009 | Mount Lemmon | Mount Lemmon Survey | · | 1.4 km | MPC · JPL |
| 705664 | 2009 HE_{38} | — | March 2, 2009 | Mount Lemmon | Mount Lemmon Survey | · | 1.8 km | MPC · JPL |
| 705665 | 2009 HR_{40} | — | March 2, 2009 | Mount Lemmon | Mount Lemmon Survey | · | 1.5 km | MPC · JPL |
| 705666 | 2009 HM_{50} | — | April 21, 2009 | Kitt Peak | Spacewatch | · | 1.9 km | MPC · JPL |
| 705667 | 2009 HE_{57} | — | December 4, 2007 | Mount Lemmon | Mount Lemmon Survey | · | 2.1 km | MPC · JPL |
| 705668 | 2009 HQ_{63} | — | April 22, 2009 | Mount Lemmon | Mount Lemmon Survey | · | 1.7 km | MPC · JPL |
| 705669 | 2009 HD_{67} | — | October 9, 2002 | Bergisch Gladbach | W. Bickel | · | 1.7 km | MPC · JPL |
| 705670 | 2009 HR_{71} | — | November 12, 1999 | Kitt Peak | Spacewatch | · | 1.2 km | MPC · JPL |
| 705671 | 2009 HJ_{75} | — | October 21, 2006 | Mount Lemmon | Mount Lemmon Survey | · | 2.2 km | MPC · JPL |
| 705672 | 2009 HS_{76} | — | April 18, 2009 | Catalina | CSS | · | 960 m | MPC · JPL |
| 705673 | 2009 HY_{98} | — | April 18, 2009 | Mount Lemmon | Mount Lemmon Survey | · | 810 m | MPC · JPL |
| 705674 | 2009 HC_{111} | — | April 20, 2009 | Mount Lemmon | Mount Lemmon Survey | · | 740 m | MPC · JPL |
| 705675 | 2009 HB_{112} | — | November 3, 2010 | Mount Lemmon | Mount Lemmon Survey | · | 610 m | MPC · JPL |
| 705676 | 2009 HM_{112} | — | March 18, 2009 | Kitt Peak | Spacewatch | · | 1.0 km | MPC · JPL |
| 705677 | 2009 HD_{113} | — | October 25, 2011 | Haleakala | Pan-STARRS 1 | · | 1.7 km | MPC · JPL |
| 705678 | 2009 HT_{113} | — | April 26, 2009 | Mount Lemmon | Mount Lemmon Survey | · | 910 m | MPC · JPL |
| 705679 | 2009 HX_{113} | — | April 27, 2009 | Mount Lemmon | Mount Lemmon Survey | DOR | 2.1 km | MPC · JPL |
| 705680 | 2009 HA_{114} | — | January 19, 2013 | Kitt Peak | Spacewatch | MRX | 770 m | MPC · JPL |
| 705681 | 2009 HC_{115} | — | October 15, 2015 | Haleakala | Pan-STARRS 1 | TIN | 820 m | MPC · JPL |
| 705682 | 2009 HP_{116} | — | July 13, 2016 | Haleakala | Pan-STARRS 1 | · | 600 m | MPC · JPL |
| 705683 | 2009 HU_{116} | — | March 28, 2015 | Haleakala | Pan-STARRS 1 | · | 2.4 km | MPC · JPL |
| 705684 | 2009 HZ_{116} | — | October 26, 2011 | Haleakala | Pan-STARRS 1 | MRX | 780 m | MPC · JPL |
| 705685 | 2009 HD_{117} | — | September 24, 2011 | Mount Lemmon | Mount Lemmon Survey | · | 2.4 km | MPC · JPL |
| 705686 | 2009 HZ_{117} | — | August 30, 2014 | Haleakala | Pan-STARRS 1 | · | 760 m | MPC · JPL |
| 705687 | 2009 HO_{118} | — | April 18, 2009 | Catalina | CSS | · | 1.1 km | MPC · JPL |
| 705688 | 2009 HT_{119} | — | August 21, 2015 | Haleakala | Pan-STARRS 1 | · | 1.3 km | MPC · JPL |
| 705689 | 2009 HO_{120} | — | April 29, 2014 | Haleakala | Pan-STARRS 1 | · | 1.3 km | MPC · JPL |
| 705690 | 2009 HX_{120} | — | April 18, 2009 | Mount Lemmon | Mount Lemmon Survey | · | 1.6 km | MPC · JPL |
| 705691 | 2009 HN_{121} | — | April 27, 2009 | Kitt Peak | Spacewatch | · | 2.3 km | MPC · JPL |
| 705692 | 2009 HA_{123} | — | April 29, 2009 | Kitt Peak | Spacewatch | · | 1.9 km | MPC · JPL |
| 705693 | 2009 HH_{123} | — | April 17, 2009 | Kitt Peak | Spacewatch | · | 680 m | MPC · JPL |
| 705694 | 2009 HY_{123} | — | April 20, 2009 | Mount Lemmon | Mount Lemmon Survey | HOF | 1.9 km | MPC · JPL |
| 705695 | 2009 HQ_{124} | — | March 11, 2003 | Kitt Peak | Spacewatch | · | 2.1 km | MPC · JPL |
| 705696 | 2009 HT_{125} | — | April 27, 2009 | Mount Lemmon | Mount Lemmon Survey | MAS | 590 m | MPC · JPL |
| 705697 | 2009 HW_{127} | — | April 20, 2009 | Kitt Peak | Spacewatch | · | 1.1 km | MPC · JPL |
| 705698 | 2009 JL_{9} | — | May 14, 2009 | Kitt Peak | Spacewatch | · | 1.5 km | MPC · JPL |
| 705699 | 2009 JJ_{10} | — | February 20, 2009 | Mount Lemmon | Mount Lemmon Survey | · | 1.6 km | MPC · JPL |
| 705700 | 2009 JH_{15} | — | May 2, 2009 | Cerro Burek | I. de la Cueva | · | 1.3 km | MPC · JPL |

== 705701–705800 ==
back to top

| Designation | | | Discovery | | | Properties | | Ref |
| Permanent | Provisional | Named after | Date | Site | Discoverer(s) | Category | Diam. | Ref |
|---|---|---|---|---|---|---|---|---|
| 705701 | 2009 JH_{16} | — | May 4, 2009 | Mount Lemmon | Mount Lemmon Survey | DOR | 2.0 km | MPC · JPL |
| 705702 | 2009 JW_{19} | — | May 1, 2009 | Mount Lemmon | Mount Lemmon Survey | L5 | 9.0 km | MPC · JPL |
| 705703 | 2009 JB_{20} | — | December 15, 2014 | Mount Lemmon | Mount Lemmon Survey | V | 570 m | MPC · JPL |
| 705704 | 2009 JY_{21} | — | May 15, 2009 | Kitt Peak | Spacewatch | · | 850 m | MPC · JPL |
| 705705 | 2009 JR_{23} | — | May 15, 2009 | Kitt Peak | Spacewatch | URS | 2.6 km | MPC · JPL |
| 705706 | 2009 KG_{11} | — | May 25, 2009 | Kitt Peak | Spacewatch | · | 1.9 km | MPC · JPL |
| 705707 | 2009 KJ_{13} | — | March 25, 2009 | Mount Lemmon | Mount Lemmon Survey | · | 2.1 km | MPC · JPL |
| 705708 | 2009 KQ_{14} | — | May 26, 2009 | Kitt Peak | Spacewatch | L5 | 8.8 km | MPC · JPL |
| 705709 | 2009 KY_{24} | — | March 17, 2005 | Mount Lemmon | Mount Lemmon Survey | · | 890 m | MPC · JPL |
| 705710 | 2009 KD_{25} | — | May 28, 2009 | Mount Lemmon | Mount Lemmon Survey | · | 870 m | MPC · JPL |
| 705711 | 2009 KG_{27} | — | May 30, 2009 | Mount Lemmon | Mount Lemmon Survey | · | 1.4 km | MPC · JPL |
| 705712 | 2009 KZ_{27} | — | May 30, 2009 | Mount Lemmon | Mount Lemmon Survey | · | 770 m | MPC · JPL |
| 705713 | 2009 KK_{29} | — | May 28, 2009 | Mount Lemmon | Mount Lemmon Survey | · | 2.2 km | MPC · JPL |
| 705714 | 2009 KS_{31} | — | May 25, 2009 | Mauna Kea | Yagi, M. | · | 1.2 km | MPC · JPL |
| 705715 | 2009 KP_{37} | — | January 31, 2004 | Apache Point | SDSS Collaboration | · | 1.9 km | MPC · JPL |
| 705716 | 2009 KW_{38} | — | October 24, 2011 | Haleakala | Pan-STARRS 1 | · | 1.6 km | MPC · JPL |
| 705717 | 2009 KB_{39} | — | April 16, 2012 | Haleakala | Pan-STARRS 1 | · | 690 m | MPC · JPL |
| 705718 | 2009 KN_{39} | — | May 26, 2009 | Kitt Peak | Spacewatch | · | 760 m | MPC · JPL |
| 705719 | 2009 KZ_{39} | — | May 9, 2014 | Haleakala | Pan-STARRS 1 | · | 1.5 km | MPC · JPL |
| 705720 | 2009 KB_{41} | — | January 15, 2018 | Haleakala | Pan-STARRS 1 | · | 1.6 km | MPC · JPL |
| 705721 | 2009 KM_{41} | — | April 1, 2017 | Haleakala | Pan-STARRS 1 | EUN | 930 m | MPC · JPL |
| 705722 | 2009 KP_{41} | — | March 5, 2013 | Haleakala | Pan-STARRS 1 | · | 1.7 km | MPC · JPL |
| 705723 | 2009 KM_{42} | — | September 2, 2016 | Mount Lemmon | Mount Lemmon Survey | EOS | 1.4 km | MPC · JPL |
| 705724 | 2009 LV_{3} | — | June 12, 2009 | Kitt Peak | Spacewatch | · | 1.3 km | MPC · JPL |
| 705725 | 2009 LR_{5} | — | June 15, 2009 | Kitt Peak | Spacewatch | H | 450 m | MPC · JPL |
| 705726 | 2009 LD_{6} | — | June 15, 2009 | Mount Lemmon | Mount Lemmon Survey | · | 980 m | MPC · JPL |
| 705727 | 2009 LQ_{7} | — | January 14, 2016 | Haleakala | Pan-STARRS 1 | · | 1.4 km | MPC · JPL |
| 705728 | 2009 MV_{2} | — | June 17, 2009 | Kitt Peak | Spacewatch | · | 990 m | MPC · JPL |
| 705729 | 2009 MW_{2} | — | June 17, 2009 | Kitt Peak | Spacewatch | · | 990 m | MPC · JPL |
| 705730 | 2009 MJ_{7} | — | April 10, 2005 | Catalina | CSS | PHO | 930 m | MPC · JPL |
| 705731 | 2009 MT_{7} | — | June 24, 2009 | Cerro Burek | J. L. Ortiz, I. de la Cueva | · | 1.8 km | MPC · JPL |
| 705732 | 2009 MT_{10} | — | January 22, 2015 | Haleakala | Pan-STARRS 1 | · | 710 m | MPC · JPL |
| 705733 | 2009 MX_{10} | — | January 14, 2011 | Mount Lemmon | Mount Lemmon Survey | NYS | 890 m | MPC · JPL |
| 705734 | 2009 MS_{11} | — | May 31, 2014 | Haleakala | Pan-STARRS 1 | · | 2.0 km | MPC · JPL |
| 705735 | 2009 MA_{12} | — | November 5, 2010 | Kitt Peak | Spacewatch | · | 1.9 km | MPC · JPL |
| 705736 | 2009 MC_{12} | — | November 23, 2014 | Haleakala | Pan-STARRS 1 | L5 | 10 km | MPC · JPL |
| 705737 | 2009 NJ_{1} | — | July 15, 2009 | La Sagra | OAM | · | 710 m | MPC · JPL |
| 705738 | 2009 OE_{4} | — | September 3, 2002 | Palomar | NEAT | · | 950 m | MPC · JPL |
| 705739 | 2009 OS_{10} | — | July 27, 2009 | Kitt Peak | Spacewatch | PHO | 660 m | MPC · JPL |
| 705740 | 2009 OV_{11} | — | December 16, 2006 | Kitt Peak | Spacewatch | NYS | 1.3 km | MPC · JPL |
| 705741 | 2009 OG_{13} | — | October 20, 2006 | Mount Lemmon | Mount Lemmon Survey | · | 1.2 km | MPC · JPL |
| 705742 | 2009 OA_{17} | — | July 28, 2009 | Kitt Peak | Spacewatch | · | 1.8 km | MPC · JPL |
| 705743 | 2009 OF_{19} | — | July 28, 2009 | Kitt Peak | Spacewatch | · | 1.7 km | MPC · JPL |
| 705744 | 2009 OP_{19} | — | June 23, 2009 | Mount Lemmon | Mount Lemmon Survey | MAS | 620 m | MPC · JPL |
| 705745 | 2009 OJ_{26} | — | March 10, 2016 | Haleakala | Pan-STARRS 1 | · | 1.1 km | MPC · JPL |
| 705746 | 2009 OO_{26} | — | July 28, 2009 | Kitt Peak | Spacewatch | · | 1.1 km | MPC · JPL |
| 705747 | 2009 OS_{27} | — | July 27, 2009 | Kitt Peak | Spacewatch | · | 880 m | MPC · JPL |
| 705748 | 2009 OJ_{28} | — | July 27, 2009 | Kitt Peak | Spacewatch | NYS | 1.1 km | MPC · JPL |
| 705749 | 2009 OQ_{29} | — | July 31, 2009 | Kitt Peak | Spacewatch | · | 1.4 km | MPC · JPL |
| 705750 | 2009 PP_{3} | — | August 15, 2009 | Catalina | CSS | · | 840 m | MPC · JPL |
| 705751 | 2009 PM_{9} | — | February 8, 2008 | Kitt Peak | Spacewatch | H | 350 m | MPC · JPL |
| 705752 | 2009 PB_{22} | — | August 15, 2009 | Kitt Peak | Spacewatch | · | 2.5 km | MPC · JPL |
| 705753 | 2009 PC_{22} | — | October 12, 2010 | Mount Lemmon | Mount Lemmon Survey | · | 2.0 km | MPC · JPL |
| 705754 | 2009 PS_{22} | — | October 17, 2017 | Mount Lemmon | Mount Lemmon Survey | PHO | 880 m | MPC · JPL |
| 705755 | 2009 PK_{24} | — | August 1, 2009 | Kitt Peak | Spacewatch | · | 930 m | MPC · JPL |
| 705756 | 2009 QX_{1} | — | August 16, 2009 | Vicques | M. Ory | · | 2.1 km | MPC · JPL |
| 705757 | 2009 QO_{2} | — | August 28, 2002 | Palomar | NEAT | · | 900 m | MPC · JPL |
| 705758 | 2009 QD_{8} | — | August 18, 2009 | Bergisch Gladbach | W. Bickel | V | 540 m | MPC · JPL |
| 705759 | 2009 QQ_{10} | — | September 26, 2005 | Kitt Peak | Spacewatch | · | 1.1 km | MPC · JPL |
| 705760 | 2009 QL_{11} | — | August 10, 2009 | Kitt Peak | Spacewatch | · | 1.7 km | MPC · JPL |
| 705761 | 2009 QP_{11} | — | August 16, 2009 | La Sagra | OAM | · | 1.1 km | MPC · JPL |
| 705762 | 2009 QZ_{13} | — | August 16, 2009 | Kitt Peak | Spacewatch | NYS | 1.1 km | MPC · JPL |
| 705763 | 2009 QC_{15} | — | August 16, 2009 | Kitt Peak | Spacewatch | EUN | 1 km | MPC · JPL |
| 705764 | 2009 QO_{18} | — | August 17, 2009 | Kitt Peak | Spacewatch | · | 990 m | MPC · JPL |
| 705765 | 2009 QO_{32} | — | August 17, 2009 | La Sagra | OAM | · | 950 m | MPC · JPL |
| 705766 | 2009 QQ_{37} | — | January 10, 2007 | Mount Lemmon | Mount Lemmon Survey | MAS | 880 m | MPC · JPL |
| 705767 | 2009 QT_{37} | — | August 27, 2009 | Bergisch Gladbach | W. Bickel | · | 980 m | MPC · JPL |
| 705768 | 2009 QW_{40} | — | August 16, 2009 | Catalina | CSS | PHO | 700 m | MPC · JPL |
| 705769 | 2009 QZ_{40} | — | August 16, 2009 | La Sagra | OAM | · | 980 m | MPC · JPL |
| 705770 | 2009 QA_{45} | — | August 15, 2009 | Kitt Peak | Spacewatch | · | 2.6 km | MPC · JPL |
| 705771 | 2009 QQ_{45} | — | August 28, 2009 | Kitt Peak | Spacewatch | · | 1.1 km | MPC · JPL |
| 705772 | 2009 QT_{48} | — | August 27, 2009 | Kitt Peak | Spacewatch | · | 890 m | MPC · JPL |
| 705773 | 2009 QM_{49} | — | August 28, 2009 | Kitt Peak | Spacewatch | · | 950 m | MPC · JPL |
| 705774 | 2009 QR_{50} | — | August 25, 2005 | Palomar | NEAT | MAS | 720 m | MPC · JPL |
| 705775 | 2009 QQ_{52} | — | August 19, 2009 | Kitt Peak | Spacewatch | · | 2.0 km | MPC · JPL |
| 705776 | 2009 QF_{60} | — | August 16, 2009 | Kitt Peak | Spacewatch | · | 1.9 km | MPC · JPL |
| 705777 | 2009 QO_{64} | — | August 27, 2009 | Kitt Peak | Spacewatch | · | 1.2 km | MPC · JPL |
| 705778 | 2009 QY_{65} | — | August 16, 2009 | Kitt Peak | Spacewatch | · | 1.2 km | MPC · JPL |
| 705779 | 2009 QD_{66} | — | August 18, 2009 | Kitt Peak | Spacewatch | · | 2.2 km | MPC · JPL |
| 705780 | 2009 QT_{66} | — | August 27, 2009 | Kitt Peak | Spacewatch | NYS | 1.1 km | MPC · JPL |
| 705781 | 2009 QZ_{66} | — | August 18, 2009 | Kitt Peak | Spacewatch | · | 540 m | MPC · JPL |
| 705782 | 2009 QJ_{67} | — | August 16, 2009 | Catalina | CSS | · | 1.2 km | MPC · JPL |
| 705783 | 2009 QL_{67} | — | October 10, 2004 | Kitt Peak | Spacewatch | · | 1.4 km | MPC · JPL |
| 705784 | 2009 QU_{67} | — | July 30, 2014 | Kitt Peak | Spacewatch | · | 1.5 km | MPC · JPL |
| 705785 | 2009 QY_{67} | — | March 14, 2012 | Mount Lemmon | Mount Lemmon Survey | EOS | 1.5 km | MPC · JPL |
| 705786 | 2009 QA_{68} | — | August 17, 2009 | Kitt Peak | Spacewatch | · | 1.5 km | MPC · JPL |
| 705787 | 2009 QF_{68} | — | August 6, 2014 | Haleakala | Pan-STARRS 1 | · | 1.4 km | MPC · JPL |
| 705788 | 2009 QG_{70} | — | July 28, 2014 | Haleakala | Pan-STARRS 1 | · | 1.4 km | MPC · JPL |
| 705789 | 2009 QH_{70} | — | August 20, 2009 | Kitt Peak | Spacewatch | · | 1.1 km | MPC · JPL |
| 705790 | 2009 QF_{72} | — | August 27, 2009 | Kitt Peak | Spacewatch | · | 1 km | MPC · JPL |
| 705791 | 2009 QP_{73} | — | August 18, 2009 | Kitt Peak | Spacewatch | V | 470 m | MPC · JPL |
| 705792 | 2009 QP_{76} | — | August 18, 2009 | Kitt Peak | Spacewatch | · | 1.9 km | MPC · JPL |
| 705793 | 2009 QB_{83} | — | August 27, 2009 | Kitt Peak | Spacewatch | · | 1.4 km | MPC · JPL |
| 705794 | 2009 RO_{2} | — | September 10, 2009 | ESA OGS | ESA OGS | · | 1.1 km | MPC · JPL |
| 705795 | 2009 RU_{2} | — | September 11, 2009 | Zelenchukskaya | T. V. Krjačko, B. Satovski | NAE | 2.7 km | MPC · JPL |
| 705796 | 2009 RJ_{6} | — | August 27, 2009 | Kitt Peak | Spacewatch | TRE | 2.1 km | MPC · JPL |
| 705797 | 2009 RE_{8} | — | September 12, 2009 | Kitt Peak | Spacewatch | · | 610 m | MPC · JPL |
| 705798 | 2009 RZ_{10} | — | September 12, 2009 | Kitt Peak | Spacewatch | · | 1.7 km | MPC · JPL |
| 705799 | 2009 RO_{18} | — | September 12, 2009 | Kitt Peak | Spacewatch | · | 1.1 km | MPC · JPL |
| 705800 | 2009 RX_{22} | — | September 15, 2009 | Mount Lemmon | Mount Lemmon Survey | · | 1.6 km | MPC · JPL |

== 705801–705900 ==
back to top

| Designation | | | Discovery | | | Properties | | Ref |
| Permanent | Provisional | Named after | Date | Site | Discoverer(s) | Category | Diam. | Ref |
|---|---|---|---|---|---|---|---|---|
| 705801 | 2009 RT_{23} | — | September 15, 2009 | Mount Lemmon | Mount Lemmon Survey | · | 1.3 km | MPC · JPL |
| 705802 | 2009 RB_{26} | — | September 16, 2009 | Kitt Peak | Spacewatch | · | 1.9 km | MPC · JPL |
| 705803 | 2009 RC_{36} | — | August 16, 2009 | Kitt Peak | Spacewatch | · | 990 m | MPC · JPL |
| 705804 | 2009 RR_{37} | — | September 15, 2009 | Kitt Peak | Spacewatch | EOS | 1.6 km | MPC · JPL |
| 705805 | 2009 RH_{42} | — | September 15, 2009 | Kitt Peak | Spacewatch | · | 2.1 km | MPC · JPL |
| 705806 | 2009 RS_{42} | — | September 15, 2009 | Kitt Peak | Spacewatch | · | 2.3 km | MPC · JPL |
| 705807 | 2009 RC_{43} | — | June 17, 2005 | Mount Lemmon | Mount Lemmon Survey | · | 910 m | MPC · JPL |
| 705808 | 2009 RM_{44} | — | September 15, 2009 | Kitt Peak | Spacewatch | DOR | 2.1 km | MPC · JPL |
| 705809 | 2009 RZ_{44} | — | September 15, 2009 | Kitt Peak | Spacewatch | · | 980 m | MPC · JPL |
| 705810 | 2009 RJ_{64} | — | September 15, 2009 | Kitt Peak | Spacewatch | L4 | 5.2 km | MPC · JPL |
| 705811 | 2009 RA_{68} | — | October 29, 2010 | Mount Lemmon | Mount Lemmon Survey | L4 · ERY | 5.5 km | MPC · JPL |
| 705812 | 2009 RK_{77} | — | March 30, 2012 | Mount Lemmon | Mount Lemmon Survey | · | 2.0 km | MPC · JPL |
| 705813 | 2009 RG_{78} | — | September 14, 2009 | Kitt Peak | Spacewatch | · | 710 m | MPC · JPL |
| 705814 | 2009 RK_{79} | — | August 28, 2014 | Haleakala | Pan-STARRS 1 | · | 1.7 km | MPC · JPL |
| 705815 | 2009 RE_{81} | — | September 15, 2009 | Kitt Peak | Spacewatch | · | 1.2 km | MPC · JPL |
| 705816 | 2009 RH_{82} | — | September 15, 2009 | Kitt Peak | Spacewatch | · | 1.7 km | MPC · JPL |
| 705817 | 2009 RS_{82} | — | September 12, 2009 | Kitt Peak | Spacewatch | · | 1.3 km | MPC · JPL |
| 705818 | 2009 RT_{82} | — | September 15, 2009 | Kitt Peak | Spacewatch | · | 570 m | MPC · JPL |
| 705819 | 2009 SO_{4} | — | September 16, 2009 | Mount Lemmon | Mount Lemmon Survey | EOS | 1.4 km | MPC · JPL |
| 705820 | 2009 SK_{5} | — | August 18, 2009 | Kitt Peak | Spacewatch | · | 2.6 km | MPC · JPL |
| 705821 | 2009 SP_{8} | — | September 16, 2009 | Mount Lemmon | Mount Lemmon Survey | · | 1.4 km | MPC · JPL |
| 705822 | 2009 SE_{11} | — | September 16, 2009 | Mount Lemmon | Mount Lemmon Survey | · | 1.6 km | MPC · JPL |
| 705823 | 2009 SX_{11} | — | November 16, 2006 | Mount Lemmon | Mount Lemmon Survey | · | 1.0 km | MPC · JPL |
| 705824 | 2009 SG_{17} | — | August 16, 2009 | Kitt Peak | Spacewatch | · | 890 m | MPC · JPL |
| 705825 | 2009 SV_{21} | — | September 18, 2009 | Bergisch Gladbach | W. Bickel | EOS | 1.7 km | MPC · JPL |
| 705826 | 2009 SK_{22} | — | September 16, 2009 | Kitt Peak | Spacewatch | · | 1.1 km | MPC · JPL |
| 705827 | 2009 SN_{24} | — | September 16, 2009 | Kitt Peak | Spacewatch | EOS | 1.3 km | MPC · JPL |
| 705828 | 2009 SL_{26} | — | September 16, 2009 | Kitt Peak | Spacewatch | · | 1.9 km | MPC · JPL |
| 705829 | 2009 SH_{28} | — | December 24, 2006 | Mount Lemmon | Mount Lemmon Survey | EOS | 1.6 km | MPC · JPL |
| 705830 | 2009 SY_{29} | — | September 16, 2009 | Kitt Peak | Spacewatch | EOS | 1.4 km | MPC · JPL |
| 705831 | 2009 SF_{34} | — | September 16, 2009 | Kitt Peak | Spacewatch | · | 2.4 km | MPC · JPL |
| 705832 | 2009 SB_{36} | — | April 9, 2002 | Kitt Peak | Spacewatch | EOS | 1.5 km | MPC · JPL |
| 705833 | 2009 SW_{36} | — | September 16, 2009 | Kitt Peak | Spacewatch | · | 800 m | MPC · JPL |
| 705834 | 2009 SC_{45} | — | September 16, 2009 | Kitt Peak | Spacewatch | · | 3.5 km | MPC · JPL |
| 705835 | 2009 SE_{47} | — | September 16, 2009 | Kitt Peak | Spacewatch | L4 | 6.7 km | MPC · JPL |
| 705836 | 2009 SJ_{47} | — | September 16, 2009 | Kitt Peak | Spacewatch | · | 1.9 km | MPC · JPL |
| 705837 | 2009 SB_{50} | — | September 17, 2009 | Mount Lemmon | Mount Lemmon Survey | · | 1.4 km | MPC · JPL |
| 705838 | 2009 SQ_{50} | — | August 20, 2009 | Kitt Peak | Spacewatch | THM | 2.1 km | MPC · JPL |
| 705839 | 2009 SZ_{50} | — | September 11, 2009 | Zelenchukskaya | T. V. Krjačko, B. Satovski | · | 2.2 km | MPC · JPL |
| 705840 | 2009 SW_{51} | — | September 17, 2009 | Mount Lemmon | Mount Lemmon Survey | · | 1.4 km | MPC · JPL |
| 705841 | 2009 SE_{55} | — | September 17, 2009 | Mount Lemmon | Mount Lemmon Survey | NYS | 1.3 km | MPC · JPL |
| 705842 | 2009 SG_{55} | — | September 17, 2009 | Mount Lemmon | Mount Lemmon Survey | · | 1.6 km | MPC · JPL |
| 705843 | 2009 SC_{64} | — | September 17, 2009 | Mount Lemmon | Mount Lemmon Survey | KOR | 1.2 km | MPC · JPL |
| 705844 | 2009 SU_{67} | — | September 17, 2009 | Kitt Peak | Spacewatch | TEL | 1.0 km | MPC · JPL |
| 705845 | 2009 SY_{76} | — | September 17, 2009 | Kitt Peak | Spacewatch | · | 2.7 km | MPC · JPL |
| 705846 | 2009 SC_{77} | — | September 17, 2009 | Kitt Peak | Spacewatch | HYG | 2.3 km | MPC · JPL |
| 705847 | 2009 SN_{78} | — | October 24, 2004 | Pla D'Arguines | R. Ferrando | · | 2.6 km | MPC · JPL |
| 705848 | 2009 SN_{83} | — | September 18, 2009 | Mount Lemmon | Mount Lemmon Survey | · | 1.4 km | MPC · JPL |
| 705849 | 2009 SV_{91} | — | September 18, 2009 | Kitt Peak | Spacewatch | · | 1.8 km | MPC · JPL |
| 705850 | 2009 SZ_{95} | — | September 19, 2009 | Kitt Peak | Spacewatch | KOR | 1.1 km | MPC · JPL |
| 705851 | 2009 SS_{98} | — | September 24, 2009 | Mount Lemmon | Mount Lemmon Survey | NYS | 1.0 km | MPC · JPL |
| 705852 | 2009 SE_{100} | — | August 25, 2005 | Palomar | NEAT | NYS | 1 km | MPC · JPL |
| 705853 | 2009 SV_{100} | — | September 21, 2009 | La Silla | A. Galád | · | 1.0 km | MPC · JPL |
| 705854 | 2009 SZ_{101} | — | August 18, 2009 | Kitt Peak | Spacewatch | · | 2.0 km | MPC · JPL |
| 705855 | 2009 SE_{102} | — | June 17, 2005 | Mount Lemmon | Mount Lemmon Survey | NYS | 1.1 km | MPC · JPL |
| 705856 | 2009 SX_{103} | — | September 22, 2009 | La Silla | A. Galád | KOR | 1.2 km | MPC · JPL |
| 705857 | 2009 SY_{106} | — | November 30, 2005 | Kitt Peak | Spacewatch | · | 1.5 km | MPC · JPL |
| 705858 | 2009 SZ_{108} | — | September 17, 2009 | Mount Lemmon | Mount Lemmon Survey | · | 670 m | MPC · JPL |
| 705859 | 2009 SD_{113} | — | September 18, 2009 | Kitt Peak | Spacewatch | (31811) | 2.6 km | MPC · JPL |
| 705860 | 2009 SC_{115} | — | September 18, 2009 | Kitt Peak | Spacewatch | · | 510 m | MPC · JPL |
| 705861 | 2009 SH_{121} | — | September 18, 2009 | Kitt Peak | Spacewatch | · | 1.5 km | MPC · JPL |
| 705862 | 2009 SK_{121} | — | March 29, 2008 | Mount Lemmon | Mount Lemmon Survey | V | 540 m | MPC · JPL |
| 705863 | 2009 SV_{121} | — | September 18, 2009 | Kitt Peak | Spacewatch | · | 1.1 km | MPC · JPL |
| 705864 | 2009 SP_{124} | — | September 18, 2009 | Kitt Peak | Spacewatch | · | 810 m | MPC · JPL |
| 705865 | 2009 SE_{125} | — | September 18, 2009 | Kitt Peak | Spacewatch | · | 1.5 km | MPC · JPL |
| 705866 | 2009 SQ_{131} | — | September 18, 2009 | Kitt Peak | Spacewatch | · | 920 m | MPC · JPL |
| 705867 | 2009 ST_{139} | — | September 19, 2009 | Kitt Peak | Spacewatch | · | 1.8 km | MPC · JPL |
| 705868 | 2009 SL_{142} | — | September 19, 2009 | Mount Lemmon | Mount Lemmon Survey | · | 860 m | MPC · JPL |
| 705869 | 2009 SR_{160} | — | September 20, 2009 | Kitt Peak | Spacewatch | · | 2.3 km | MPC · JPL |
| 705870 | 2009 SD_{162} | — | January 27, 2007 | Mount Lemmon | Mount Lemmon Survey | · | 2.5 km | MPC · JPL |
| 705871 | 2009 SC_{166} | — | August 15, 2009 | Catalina | CSS | · | 1.4 km | MPC · JPL |
| 705872 | 2009 SB_{169} | — | July 28, 2005 | Palomar | NEAT | NYS | 1.0 km | MPC · JPL |
| 705873 | 2009 SR_{170} | — | September 23, 2009 | Mount Lemmon | Mount Lemmon Survey | · | 1.0 km | MPC · JPL |
| 705874 | 2009 SB_{171} | — | September 20, 2009 | Mount Lemmon | Mount Lemmon Survey | · | 1.8 km | MPC · JPL |
| 705875 | 2009 SX_{171} | — | September 28, 2009 | Mount Lemmon | Mount Lemmon Survey | · | 2.3 km | MPC · JPL |
| 705876 | 2009 SC_{173} | — | September 18, 2009 | Kitt Peak | Spacewatch | · | 2.3 km | MPC · JPL |
| 705877 | 2009 SD_{173} | — | September 18, 2009 | Kitt Peak | Spacewatch | · | 2.1 km | MPC · JPL |
| 705878 | 2009 SJ_{173} | — | February 1, 2006 | Kitt Peak | Spacewatch | · | 2.7 km | MPC · JPL |
| 705879 | 2009 SZ_{182} | — | September 21, 2009 | Mount Lemmon | Mount Lemmon Survey | EOS | 1.5 km | MPC · JPL |
| 705880 | 2009 SV_{188} | — | September 21, 2009 | Kitt Peak | Spacewatch | · | 1.8 km | MPC · JPL |
| 705881 | 2009 SV_{189} | — | September 22, 2009 | Kitt Peak | Spacewatch | · | 1.1 km | MPC · JPL |
| 705882 | 2009 SU_{192} | — | April 30, 2008 | Mount Lemmon | Mount Lemmon Survey | NYS | 1.0 km | MPC · JPL |
| 705883 | 2009 SM_{197} | — | September 18, 2009 | Kitt Peak | Spacewatch | EOS | 1.7 km | MPC · JPL |
| 705884 | 2009 SU_{197} | — | September 22, 2009 | Kitt Peak | Spacewatch | · | 1.8 km | MPC · JPL |
| 705885 | 2009 SD_{198} | — | September 22, 2009 | Kitt Peak | Spacewatch | · | 2.0 km | MPC · JPL |
| 705886 | 2009 SP_{198} | — | September 22, 2009 | Kitt Peak | Spacewatch | · | 1.7 km | MPC · JPL |
| 705887 | 2009 SQ_{198} | — | September 22, 2009 | Kitt Peak | Spacewatch | · | 2.7 km | MPC · JPL |
| 705888 | 2009 SG_{199} | — | September 22, 2009 | Kitt Peak | Spacewatch | · | 1.6 km | MPC · JPL |
| 705889 | 2009 SC_{201} | — | September 22, 2009 | Kitt Peak | Spacewatch | · | 1.2 km | MPC · JPL |
| 705890 | 2009 SF_{202} | — | September 22, 2009 | Kitt Peak | Spacewatch | L4 | 6.6 km | MPC · JPL |
| 705891 | 2009 SS_{202} | — | September 22, 2009 | Kitt Peak | Spacewatch | · | 2.0 km | MPC · JPL |
| 705892 | 2009 SV_{203} | — | September 22, 2009 | Kitt Peak | Spacewatch | · | 1.6 km | MPC · JPL |
| 705893 | 2009 SQ_{211} | — | September 23, 2009 | Mount Lemmon | Mount Lemmon Survey | · | 2.1 km | MPC · JPL |
| 705894 | 2009 SD_{212} | — | September 23, 2009 | Kitt Peak | Spacewatch | · | 1.4 km | MPC · JPL |
| 705895 | 2009 SL_{212} | — | September 15, 2009 | Kitt Peak | Spacewatch | · | 2.0 km | MPC · JPL |
| 705896 | 2009 SR_{216} | — | June 17, 2005 | Mount Lemmon | Mount Lemmon Survey | MAS | 730 m | MPC · JPL |
| 705897 | 2009 SR_{217} | — | August 16, 2009 | Kitt Peak | Spacewatch | · | 2.3 km | MPC · JPL |
| 705898 | 2009 SG_{220} | — | September 24, 2009 | Mount Lemmon | Mount Lemmon Survey | EOS | 1.5 km | MPC · JPL |
| 705899 | 2009 SX_{220} | — | August 19, 2009 | Catalina | CSS | TIR | 2.6 km | MPC · JPL |
| 705900 | 2009 SM_{221} | — | August 18, 2009 | Kitt Peak | Spacewatch | · | 610 m | MPC · JPL |

== 705901–706000 ==
back to top

| Designation | | | Discovery | | | Properties | | Ref |
| Permanent | Provisional | Named after | Date | Site | Discoverer(s) | Category | Diam. | Ref |
|---|---|---|---|---|---|---|---|---|
| 705901 | 2009 SP_{223} | — | August 29, 2009 | Kitt Peak | Spacewatch | · | 1.3 km | MPC · JPL |
| 705902 | 2009 SR_{223} | — | August 29, 2009 | Kitt Peak | Spacewatch | · | 1.6 km | MPC · JPL |
| 705903 | 2009 SD_{225} | — | September 18, 2009 | Kitt Peak | Spacewatch | WIT | 860 m | MPC · JPL |
| 705904 | 2009 SC_{226} | — | September 26, 2009 | Mount Lemmon | Mount Lemmon Survey | V | 580 m | MPC · JPL |
| 705905 | 2009 SW_{227} | — | September 26, 2009 | Kitt Peak | Spacewatch | KOR | 1.1 km | MPC · JPL |
| 705906 | 2009 SW_{229} | — | September 16, 2009 | Kitt Peak | Spacewatch | · | 1.3 km | MPC · JPL |
| 705907 | 2009 SL_{230} | — | September 16, 2009 | Catalina | CSS | NYS | 1.1 km | MPC · JPL |
| 705908 | 2009 SC_{237} | — | August 18, 2009 | Kitt Peak | Spacewatch | · | 1.3 km | MPC · JPL |
| 705909 | 2009 ST_{237} | — | September 16, 2009 | Catalina | CSS | · | 2.0 km | MPC · JPL |
| 705910 | 2009 SJ_{243} | — | September 15, 2009 | Catalina | CSS | · | 2.1 km | MPC · JPL |
| 705911 | 2009 SK_{250} | — | September 19, 2009 | Kitt Peak | Spacewatch | · | 1.2 km | MPC · JPL |
| 705912 | 2009 SO_{252} | — | September 21, 2009 | Kitt Peak | Spacewatch | · | 2.0 km | MPC · JPL |
| 705913 | 2009 SP_{257} | — | September 21, 2009 | Catalina | CSS | · | 2.2 km | MPC · JPL |
| 705914 | 2009 SD_{259} | — | September 22, 2009 | Mount Lemmon | Mount Lemmon Survey | · | 980 m | MPC · JPL |
| 705915 | 2009 SF_{261} | — | February 21, 2007 | Mount Lemmon | Mount Lemmon Survey | MAS | 590 m | MPC · JPL |
| 705916 | 2009 SU_{268} | — | September 24, 2009 | Kitt Peak | Spacewatch | · | 2.1 km | MPC · JPL |
| 705917 | 2009 SB_{271} | — | September 16, 2009 | Kitt Peak | Spacewatch | · | 2.4 km | MPC · JPL |
| 705918 | 2009 SJ_{272} | — | September 24, 2009 | Kitt Peak | Spacewatch | EOS | 1.7 km | MPC · JPL |
| 705919 | 2009 SQ_{275} | — | October 13, 1998 | Kitt Peak | Spacewatch | NYS | 980 m | MPC · JPL |
| 705920 | 2009 SB_{278} | — | September 17, 2009 | Kitt Peak | Spacewatch | · | 620 m | MPC · JPL |
| 705921 | 2009 SG_{278} | — | September 25, 2009 | Kitt Peak | Spacewatch | · | 1.7 km | MPC · JPL |
| 705922 | 2009 SL_{278} | — | September 25, 2009 | Kitt Peak | Spacewatch | V | 530 m | MPC · JPL |
| 705923 | 2009 SO_{278} | — | September 25, 2009 | Kitt Peak | Spacewatch | · | 1.5 km | MPC · JPL |
| 705924 | 2009 SY_{279} | — | September 17, 2009 | Kitt Peak | Spacewatch | EOS | 1.6 km | MPC · JPL |
| 705925 | 2009 SD_{280} | — | September 25, 2009 | Kitt Peak | Spacewatch | · | 1.7 km | MPC · JPL |
| 705926 | 2009 SA_{287} | — | September 25, 2009 | Kitt Peak | Spacewatch | · | 930 m | MPC · JPL |
| 705927 | 2009 SC_{287} | — | April 23, 2007 | Kitt Peak | Spacewatch | · | 2.5 km | MPC · JPL |
| 705928 | 2009 SQ_{292} | — | September 26, 2009 | Kitt Peak | Spacewatch | · | 1.9 km | MPC · JPL |
| 705929 | 2009 SU_{294} | — | September 27, 2009 | Mount Lemmon | Mount Lemmon Survey | · | 1.2 km | MPC · JPL |
| 705930 | 2009 SA_{295} | — | March 9, 2008 | Kitt Peak | Spacewatch | · | 1.0 km | MPC · JPL |
| 705931 | 2009 SO_{295} | — | September 27, 2009 | Sandlot | G. Hug | · | 790 m | MPC · JPL |
| 705932 | 2009 SC_{296} | — | September 27, 2009 | Mount Lemmon | Mount Lemmon Survey | EOS | 1.6 km | MPC · JPL |
| 705933 | 2009 SH_{296} | — | September 27, 2009 | Kitt Peak | Spacewatch | L4 | 7.1 km | MPC · JPL |
| 705934 | 2009 SN_{296} | — | September 27, 2009 | Kitt Peak | Spacewatch | · | 1.1 km | MPC · JPL |
| 705935 | 2009 SQ_{296} | — | September 27, 2009 | LightBuckets | Cullen, S. | · | 2.5 km | MPC · JPL |
| 705936 | 2009 SJ_{297} | — | September 28, 2009 | Catalina | CSS | · | 1.5 km | MPC · JPL |
| 705937 | 2009 SA_{298} | — | September 28, 2009 | Mount Lemmon | Mount Lemmon Survey | EUN | 1 km | MPC · JPL |
| 705938 | 2009 SZ_{298} | — | July 28, 2009 | Kitt Peak | Spacewatch | V | 640 m | MPC · JPL |
| 705939 | 2009 SJ_{306} | — | October 19, 1999 | Kitt Peak | Spacewatch | · | 1.6 km | MPC · JPL |
| 705940 | 2009 SX_{307} | — | March 26, 2008 | Kitt Peak | Spacewatch | · | 950 m | MPC · JPL |
| 705941 | 2009 SJ_{310} | — | September 18, 2009 | Mount Lemmon | Mount Lemmon Survey | · | 1.9 km | MPC · JPL |
| 705942 | 2009 SA_{316} | — | November 14, 2006 | Kitt Peak | Spacewatch | · | 540 m | MPC · JPL |
| 705943 | 2009 SA_{317} | — | August 20, 2009 | Kitt Peak | Spacewatch | · | 1.3 km | MPC · JPL |
| 705944 | 2009 SG_{317} | — | September 19, 2009 | Mount Lemmon | Mount Lemmon Survey | · | 820 m | MPC · JPL |
| 705945 | 2009 SD_{319} | — | September 20, 2009 | Kitt Peak | Spacewatch | · | 560 m | MPC · JPL |
| 705946 | 2009 SZ_{321} | — | September 22, 2009 | Mount Lemmon | Mount Lemmon Survey | · | 2.1 km | MPC · JPL |
| 705947 | 2009 SR_{328} | — | September 30, 2009 | Mount Lemmon | Mount Lemmon Survey | · | 2.1 km | MPC · JPL |
| 705948 | 2009 SB_{333} | — | March 27, 2001 | Kitt Peak | Spacewatch | · | 1.3 km | MPC · JPL |
| 705949 | 2009 SV_{338} | — | September 27, 2009 | Kitt Peak | Spacewatch | · | 2.7 km | MPC · JPL |
| 705950 | 2009 SB_{339} | — | September 17, 2009 | Kitt Peak | Spacewatch | EOS | 1.9 km | MPC · JPL |
| 705951 | 2009 ST_{340} | — | September 21, 2009 | Kitt Peak | Spacewatch | EOS | 1.2 km | MPC · JPL |
| 705952 | 2009 SV_{340} | — | September 22, 2009 | Kitt Peak | Spacewatch | T_{j} (2.98) | 2.7 km | MPC · JPL |
| 705953 | 2009 SW_{350} | — | September 28, 2009 | Mount Lemmon | Mount Lemmon Survey | · | 1.8 km | MPC · JPL |
| 705954 | 2009 SB_{357} | — | September 20, 2009 | Mount Lemmon | Mount Lemmon Survey | · | 2.6 km | MPC · JPL |
| 705955 | 2009 SD_{359} | — | September 21, 2009 | Mount Lemmon | Mount Lemmon Survey | EOS | 1.4 km | MPC · JPL |
| 705956 | 2009 SQ_{366} | — | September 19, 2009 | Palomar | Palomar Transient Factory | · | 2.3 km | MPC · JPL |
| 705957 | 2009 SX_{366} | — | September 24, 2009 | Catalina | CSS | · | 2.5 km | MPC · JPL |
| 705958 | 2009 SK_{371} | — | September 17, 2009 | Mount Lemmon | Mount Lemmon Survey | · | 1.6 km | MPC · JPL |
| 705959 | 2009 SQ_{371} | — | September 21, 2009 | Kitt Peak | Spacewatch | · | 1.9 km | MPC · JPL |
| 705960 | 2009 SQ_{372} | — | February 16, 2007 | Mount Lemmon | Mount Lemmon Survey | · | 910 m | MPC · JPL |
| 705961 | 2009 SS_{373} | — | September 21, 2009 | Kitt Peak | Spacewatch | · | 2.4 km | MPC · JPL |
| 705962 | 2009 SU_{373} | — | September 21, 2009 | Mount Lemmon | Mount Lemmon Survey | EOS | 1.5 km | MPC · JPL |
| 705963 | 2009 SH_{374} | — | August 8, 2016 | Haleakala | Pan-STARRS 1 | · | 740 m | MPC · JPL |
| 705964 | 2009 SM_{374} | — | September 28, 2009 | Kitt Peak | Spacewatch | KOR | 1.1 km | MPC · JPL |
| 705965 | 2009 SO_{374} | — | September 27, 2009 | Kitt Peak | Spacewatch | 3:2 | 4.4 km | MPC · JPL |
| 705966 | 2009 SE_{375} | — | September 18, 2009 | Kitt Peak | Spacewatch | · | 2.2 km | MPC · JPL |
| 705967 | 2009 SQ_{375} | — | March 15, 2012 | Mount Lemmon | Mount Lemmon Survey | · | 1.6 km | MPC · JPL |
| 705968 | 2009 SC_{376} | — | August 29, 2009 | Kitt Peak | Spacewatch | · | 2.2 km | MPC · JPL |
| 705969 | 2009 SD_{377} | — | April 27, 2012 | Haleakala | Pan-STARRS 1 | WIT | 670 m | MPC · JPL |
| 705970 | 2009 SV_{377} | — | March 6, 2016 | Haleakala | Pan-STARRS 1 | H | 360 m | MPC · JPL |
| 705971 | 2009 SW_{377} | — | June 29, 2014 | Haleakala | Pan-STARRS 1 | · | 2.7 km | MPC · JPL |
| 705972 | 2009 SS_{382} | — | June 1, 2013 | Haleakala | Pan-STARRS 1 | · | 1.6 km | MPC · JPL |
| 705973 | 2009 SU_{382} | — | September 22, 2009 | Kitt Peak | Spacewatch | WAT | 1.3 km | MPC · JPL |
| 705974 | 2009 SW_{382} | — | November 1, 2013 | Kitt Peak | Spacewatch | · | 780 m | MPC · JPL |
| 705975 | 2009 SC_{383} | — | December 10, 2010 | Mount Lemmon | Mount Lemmon Survey | · | 1.9 km | MPC · JPL |
| 705976 | 2009 SN_{383} | — | September 21, 2009 | Mount Lemmon | Mount Lemmon Survey | · | 2.2 km | MPC · JPL |
| 705977 | 2009 SB_{384} | — | September 30, 2009 | Mount Lemmon | Mount Lemmon Survey | · | 1.6 km | MPC · JPL |
| 705978 | 2009 SG_{384} | — | January 17, 2015 | Haleakala | Pan-STARRS 1 | · | 1.9 km | MPC · JPL |
| 705979 | 2009 SR_{384} | — | November 30, 2014 | Haleakala | Pan-STARRS 1 | · | 980 m | MPC · JPL |
| 705980 | 2009 SY_{385} | — | August 31, 2000 | Socorro | LINEAR | · | 1.5 km | MPC · JPL |
| 705981 | 2009 SB_{389} | — | February 23, 2012 | Mount Lemmon | Mount Lemmon Survey | · | 1.4 km | MPC · JPL |
| 705982 | 2009 SH_{389} | — | January 23, 2011 | Mount Lemmon | Mount Lemmon Survey | · | 2.6 km | MPC · JPL |
| 705983 | 2009 SL_{389} | — | March 16, 2012 | Mount Lemmon | Mount Lemmon Survey | EOS | 1.7 km | MPC · JPL |
| 705984 | 2009 SN_{389} | — | March 16, 2012 | Haleakala | Pan-STARRS 1 | · | 1.8 km | MPC · JPL |
| 705985 | 2009 SG_{390} | — | August 4, 2014 | Haleakala | Pan-STARRS 1 | · | 1.3 km | MPC · JPL |
| 705986 | 2009 SJ_{390} | — | July 30, 2014 | Kitt Peak | Spacewatch | · | 1.5 km | MPC · JPL |
| 705987 | 2009 SH_{391} | — | March 14, 2012 | Mount Lemmon | Mount Lemmon Survey | · | 1.5 km | MPC · JPL |
| 705988 | 2009 SR_{391} | — | September 20, 2009 | Kitt Peak | Spacewatch | · | 1.9 km | MPC · JPL |
| 705989 | 2009 SC_{392} | — | March 22, 2018 | Mount Lemmon | Mount Lemmon Survey | LIX | 2.8 km | MPC · JPL |
| 705990 | 2009 SS_{392} | — | September 30, 2009 | Mount Lemmon | Mount Lemmon Survey | EOS | 1.4 km | MPC · JPL |
| 705991 | 2009 SH_{394} | — | September 21, 2009 | Mount Lemmon | Mount Lemmon Survey | · | 840 m | MPC · JPL |
| 705992 | 2009 ST_{394} | — | September 29, 2009 | Mount Lemmon | Mount Lemmon Survey | · | 1.7 km | MPC · JPL |
| 705993 | 2009 SS_{395} | — | January 10, 2013 | Haleakala | Pan-STARRS 1 | L4 | 5.9 km | MPC · JPL |
| 705994 | 2009 SP_{396} | — | September 20, 2009 | Kitt Peak | Spacewatch | · | 1.4 km | MPC · JPL |
| 705995 | 2009 SW_{396} | — | September 20, 2009 | Kitt Peak | Spacewatch | KOR | 950 m | MPC · JPL |
| 705996 | 2009 SC_{397} | — | September 23, 2009 | Kitt Peak | Spacewatch | MAS | 590 m | MPC · JPL |
| 705997 | 2009 SH_{398} | — | September 29, 2009 | Mount Lemmon | Mount Lemmon Survey | NEM | 1.9 km | MPC · JPL |
| 705998 | 2009 SL_{398} | — | September 18, 2009 | Kitt Peak | Spacewatch | · | 1.7 km | MPC · JPL |
| 705999 | 2009 SN_{401} | — | September 18, 2009 | Mount Lemmon | Mount Lemmon Survey | VER | 1.8 km | MPC · JPL |
| 706000 | 2009 SV_{403} | — | September 26, 2009 | Kitt Peak | Spacewatch | · | 2.2 km | MPC · JPL |

back to top
