= List of scientific priority disputes =

This is a list of priority disputes in history of science.

== Astronomy ==
- 1558 invention of the geoheliocentric system: Tycho Brahe, Nicolaus Raimarus Ursus
- 1609–1610 Galilean moons: Galileo, Simon Marius
- 1612 discovery of sunspots: Galileo Galilei, Christoph Scheiner
- 1846 prediction of Neptune: Urbain Le Verrier, John Couch Adams
- 2004–2005 controversy over the discovery of Haumea: José Luis Ortiz Moreno, Michael E. Brown.

== Biology and medicine ==
- 1652 discovery of the lymphatic system: Olof Rudbeck, Thomas Bartholin
- c. 1660 teaching a deaf-mute person to speak: John Wallis, William Holder
- c. 1667 first human blood transfusion: Richard Lower, Henry Oldenburg, Jean-Baptiste Denys
- c. 1859 development of the theory of evolution: Charles Darwin, Alfred Russel Wallace, Patrick Matthew
- 1877–1892 Bone Wars: Edward Drinker Cope, Othniel Charles Marsh.
- 1882–1889: Koch–Pasteur rivalry: Louis Pasteur, Robert Koch.
- 1899–1902 discovery of the life cycle of malarial parasite: Giovanni Battista Grassi, Ronald Ross
- 1953–1962 discovery of the DNA structure: Francis Crick, James D. Watson, Rosalind Franklin, Erwin Chargaff, Oswald Avery
- 1971–1973 discovery of opiate receptors: Candace Pert, Solomon H. Snyder
- 1971–1975 invention of magnetic resonance imaging (MRI): Paul Lauterbur, Peter Mansfield, Raymond Vahan Damadian, and others (see 2003 Nobel Prize in Physiology or Medicine)
- 1983 discovery of HIV: Robert Gallo, Luc Montagnier (see 2008 Nobel Prize in Physiology or Medicine)

== Chemistry ==
- 1604-1777 discovery of oxygen: Joseph Priestley, Carl Wilhelm Scheele, Antoine Laurent Lavoisier
- 1864 synthesis dicarboxylic acids from carboxylic acids (diacids from monoacid reactions): Hugo Müller, Hermann Kolbe, Hans Hübner, Friedrich Konrad Beilstein, Maxwell Simpson.
- 1870–1895 development of the periodic table: Dmitri Mendeleev, Lothar Meyer
- 1960–1994 Transfermium Wars: Lawrence Berkeley National Laboratory, Joint Institute for Nuclear Research.

== Mathematics ==
- 1550–1557 discovery of solutions to cubic equations: Niccolò Tartaglia, Gerolamo Cardano
- 1669–1704 discovery of l'Hôpital's rule: Guillaume de l'Hôpital, Johann Bernoulli.
- 1699–1716 Leibniz–Newton calculus controversy: Isaac Newton, Gottfried Leibniz
- 1949 proof of the prime number theorem: Atle Selberg and/or Paul Erdős
- 2002–2003 proof of the Poincaré conjecture: Grigori Perelman or Shing-Tung Yau
- 2026 Navier–Stokes priority controversy: Tristan Buckmaster and Levent Alpöge, OpenAI

== Physics ==
- 1679–1680 Newton–Hooke priority controversy for the inverse square law: Isaac Newton, Robert Hooke.
- 1739–1740 development of the Bernoulli's principle between Johann Bernoulli and his son Daniel Bernoulli.
- 1741–1751 development of the stationary-action principle: Pierre Louis Maupertuis, Gottfried Wilhelm Leibniz
- 1842–1845 discovery of mechanical equivalent of heat: James Prescott Joule, Julius von Mayer
- 1864–1890 discovery of radio waves: James Clerk Maxwell, Oliver Lodge, Heinrich Hertz, David Edward Hughes
- 1889–1905 special relativity priority dispute: Albert Einstein, Henri Poincaré, Hendrik Lorentz
- 1915 general relativity priority dispute: Albert Einstein, David Hilbert
- 1930–1935 development of the Chandrasekhar limit: Subrahmanyan Chandrasekhar, Edmund Clifton Stoner, Wilhelm Anderson
- 1961 development of the Eightfold Way: Murray Gell-Mann, Yuval Ne'eman
- 1998 discovery of the accelerating expansion of the universe: High-Z Supernova Search Team, Supernova Cosmology Project.

== Technology ==
- 1671–1673 invention of the watch balance spring: Robert Hooke, Christiaan Huygens.
- 1876 Elisha Gray and Alexander Bell telephone controversy: Johann Philipp Reis, Antonio Meucci, Alexander Graham Bell, Elisha Gray.
- 1878 invention of the incandescent light bulb: Thomas Edison, Joseph Swan.
- Claims to the first powered flight: Shivkar Bapuji Talpade in the Marutsakhā (1895), (Note: Claims that Talpade was the first aviator to fly a powered aeroplane have been pushed by Indian nationalists since the early 2000s. In actuality, the aircraft attributed to Talpade was unmanned. Unmanned aircraft had been flown successfully prior to Talpade's birth.) Clément Ader in the Avion III (1897), Gustave Whitehead in his No's. 21 and 22 aeroplanes (1901–1903), (Note: Various publications have debunked claims that Whitehead was the first to fly a powered aeroplane, with some even questioning the claims that Whitehead had flown one at all.) Richard Pearse in his monoplane (1903–1904), Samuel Pierpont Langley's Aerodrome A (1903), Karl Jatho in Jatho biplane (1903), The Wright brothers in the Wright Flyer (1903), (Note: Historians and researchers generally accept the Wright Brothers as being the first to achieve sustained and controlled flight.) Alberto Santos-Dumont in the 14 Bis (1906)
- c. 1880–1890 War of the currents: Thomas Edison, George Westinghouse
- 1896–1906 invention of radio: Oliver Lodge, Jagadish Chandra Bose, Reginald Fessenden, Guglielmo Marconi, Roberto Landell de Moura, Alexander Popov, Nikola Tesla
- 1927–1939 Invention of electronic television: Philo T. Farnsworth, Vladimir Zworykin

== See also ==
- List of examples of Stigler's law
- List of scientific debates
- Nobel Prize controversies
- List of multiple discoveries
