= Salacia (disambiguation) =

Salacia is Neptune's wife in Roman mythology.

Salacia may also refer to :

- Salacia (plant), a genus of plants in the family Celastraceae
- Salacia (hydrozoan), a genus of hydroids in the family Sertulariidae
- 120347 Salacia, minor planet in the Kuiper belt
- A fictional project in the video game Death by Degrees
- An ancient Roman town and short-lived bishopric in Portugal, in the present-day Alcácer do Sal Municipality
- The main setting of the series Sea Princesses
