= Scientific priority =

Credit for first discovery

In science, priority is the credit given to the individual or group of individuals who first made the discovery or proposed the theory. Fame and honours usually go to the first person or group to publish a new finding, even if several researchers arrived at the same conclusion independently and at the same time. Thus, between two or more independent discoverers, the first to publish is the legitimate winner. Hence, the tradition is often referred to as the priority rule, the procedure of which can be summed up in the phrase "publish or perish", because there are generally no prizes for second place in science academia. In a way, the race to be first inspires risk-taking that can lead to scientific breakthroughs which is beneficial to the society (such as discovery of malaria transmission, DNA, HIV, etc.). On the other hand, it can create unhealthy competition and incentives to publish low-quality findings (e.g., quantity over quality or committing scientific misconduct), which can lead to an unreliable published literature and harm scientific progress.

== Priority disputes ==
Priority becomes a difficult issue in the context of priority disputes, in which scientists question who was the first to propose a given theory, make a discovery, or arrive at a particular understanding. Historians of science are generally skeptical of attempts to settle such disputes retrospectively, arguing that these disputes often lack understanding about the nature of scientific change and tend to involve gross misreadings of historical evidence in order to support claims that someone had been overlooked as the original discoverer. Historian and biologist Stephen Jay Gould once remarked that “debates about the priority of ideas are usually among the most misdirected in the history of science.”

Richard Feynman told Freeman Dyson that he avoided priority disputes by “Always giv[ing] the bastards more credit than they deserve.” Dyson remarked that he also follows this rule, and that this practice is “remarkably effective for avoiding quarrels and making friends.”

The Leibniz–Newton calculus controversy was a high-profile priority dispute in the 17th century. The discoveries of Neptune and Haumea were subject to priority disputes, as were the discoveries of Oxygen and several other chemical elements. Priority disputes for the invention of the telephone and the invention of radio both lead to patent disputes.

== See also ==
- List of scientific priority disputes
- Multiple discovery
- Priority right in patent law
- Stigler's law
- Binomial nomenclature, where priority is usually enforced through rules
