= 307261 Máni =

Classical Kuiper belt object

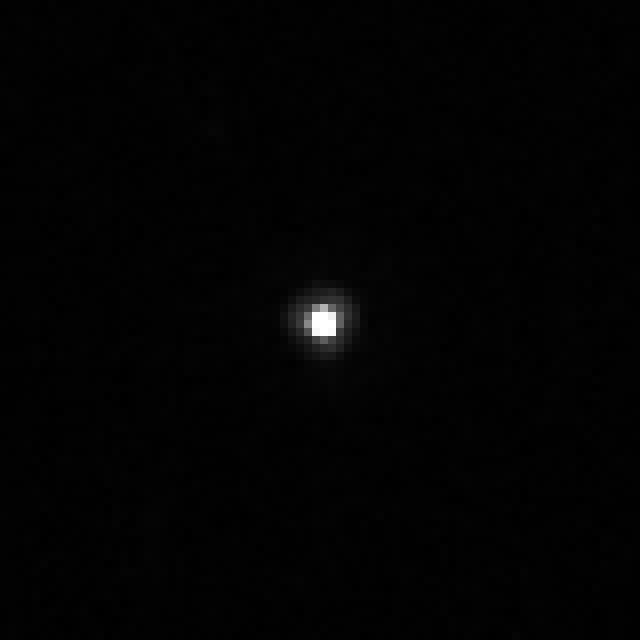
- Máni imaged by the Hubble Space Telescope on 9 April 2006

Discovery
- Discovered by: Chadwick A. Trujillo; Michael E. Brown
- Discovery site: Palomar Obs.
- Discovery date: 18 June 2002

Designations
- Pronunciation: /ˈmɑːni/
- Named after: Máni
- Alternative designations: 2002 MS_{4}
- Minor planet category: TNO · classical (hot) distant · Scat-Ext

Orbital characteristics (barycentric) (Note: These orbital elements are expressed in terms of the Solar System Barycenter (SSB) as the frame of reference. Due to planetary perturbations, the Sun revolves around the SSB at non-negligible distances, so heliocentric-frame orbital elements and distances can vary in short timescales as shown in JPL-Horizons.)
- Epoch 25 February 2023 (JD 2460000.5)
- Uncertainty parameter 1
- Observation arc: 68.24 yr (24,924 d)
- Earliest precovery date: 8 April 1954
- Aphelion: 47.801 AU
- Perihelion: 35.677 AU
- Semi-major axis: 41.739 AU
- Eccentricity: 0.1453
- Orbital period (sidereal): 269.48 yr (98,429 d)
- Mean anomaly: 226.844°
- Mean motion: 0° 0^{m} 13.167^{s} / day
- Inclination: 17.693°
- Longitude of ascending node: 216.075°
- Time of perihelion: ≈ 10 June 2123
- Argument of perihelion: 214.575°
- Known satellites: 0 (1 unconfirmed)

Physical characteristics
- Dimensions: (824±20) × (770±34) km (projected)
- Mean diameter: 796±24 km
- Flattening: ≥0.066±0.034
- Sidereal rotation period: 14.251 h 7.33 h or 10.44 h (single-peaked) (Note: The "single-peaked" rotation period refers to the peak-to-trough period in Máni's light curve. The single-peaked period is the true rotation period of Máni if the object is spheroidal and has albedo variations on its surface. If Máni is an elongated triaxial ellipsoid on the other hand, then it would produce a double-peaked light curve, where the object's true rotation period is double the single-peaked period since it spans two peaks and two troughs in its light curve.)
- Geometric albedo: 0.100±0.025 or 0.098±0.004 (geometric); 0.039±0.005 (Bond)
- Temperature: 65 K
- Spectral type: Prominent water (H_{2}O-type); (neutral); B−V = 0.69±0.02; V−R = 0.38±0.02
- Apparent magnitude: 20.5
- Absolute magnitude (H): 3.56±0.03; 3.63±0.05; 3.64 (JPL/MPC)

307261 Máni (provisional designation 2002 MS_{4}) is a large trans-Neptunian object in the Kuiper belt, a region of icy planetesimals beyond Neptune. It was discovered on 18 June 2002 by Chad Trujillo and Michael Brown during their search for Pluto-sized Kuiper belt objects at Palomar Observatory, and went unnamed until 2025, when it was named after the personification of the Moon in Norse mythology. With a diameter of about 800 km (500 mi), Máni is large enough that it might be a dwarf planet, though its irregular shape suggests that (as with the asteroid Vesta) this may not be the case. Máni is suspected to have one large moon, although it has not been confirmed with direct observations.

The surface is dark gray and is composed of water and carbon dioxide ices. Máni has been observed making stellar occultations, which revealed massive topographic features along the outline of its shape. These features include a mountain-like peak that is 25 km (16 mi) tall and a crater-like depression that is 320 km (200 mi) wide and 45 km (28 mi) deep. Máni's topographic features are among the tallest and deepest known for bodies of the Solar System.

== History ==
=== Discovery ===
Máni was discovered on 18 June 2002 by astronomers Chad Trujillo and Michael Brown at Palomar Observatory in San Diego County, California, United States. The discovery formed part of their Caltech Wide Area Sky Survey for Pluto-sized Kuiper belt objects using the observatory's 1.22-meter (48 in) Samuel Oschin telescope with its wide-field CCD camera, which was operated jointly with the nightly Near Earth Asteroid Tracking program at Palomar. This survey was responsible for the discovery of several other large objects beyond Neptune, which includes the dwarf planets Eris, Sedna, and Quaoar.

Máni was found through manual vetting of potential moving objects identified by the team's automatic image-searching software. It was among the fainter objects detected, just below the survey's limiting magnitude with an observed brightness of magnitude 20.9. (Note: The Caltech Wide Area Sky Survey's R-band limiting magnitude is 20.7. In the magnitude scale, brighter objects have a lower magnitude value whereas fainter objects have a greater magnitude value.) Follow-up observations were conducted two months later with Palomar Observatory's 1.52-meter (60 in) telescope on 8 August 2002. The discovery was announced by the Minor Planet Center on 21 November 2002 and the object was given the minor planet provisional designation of 2002 MS_{4}.

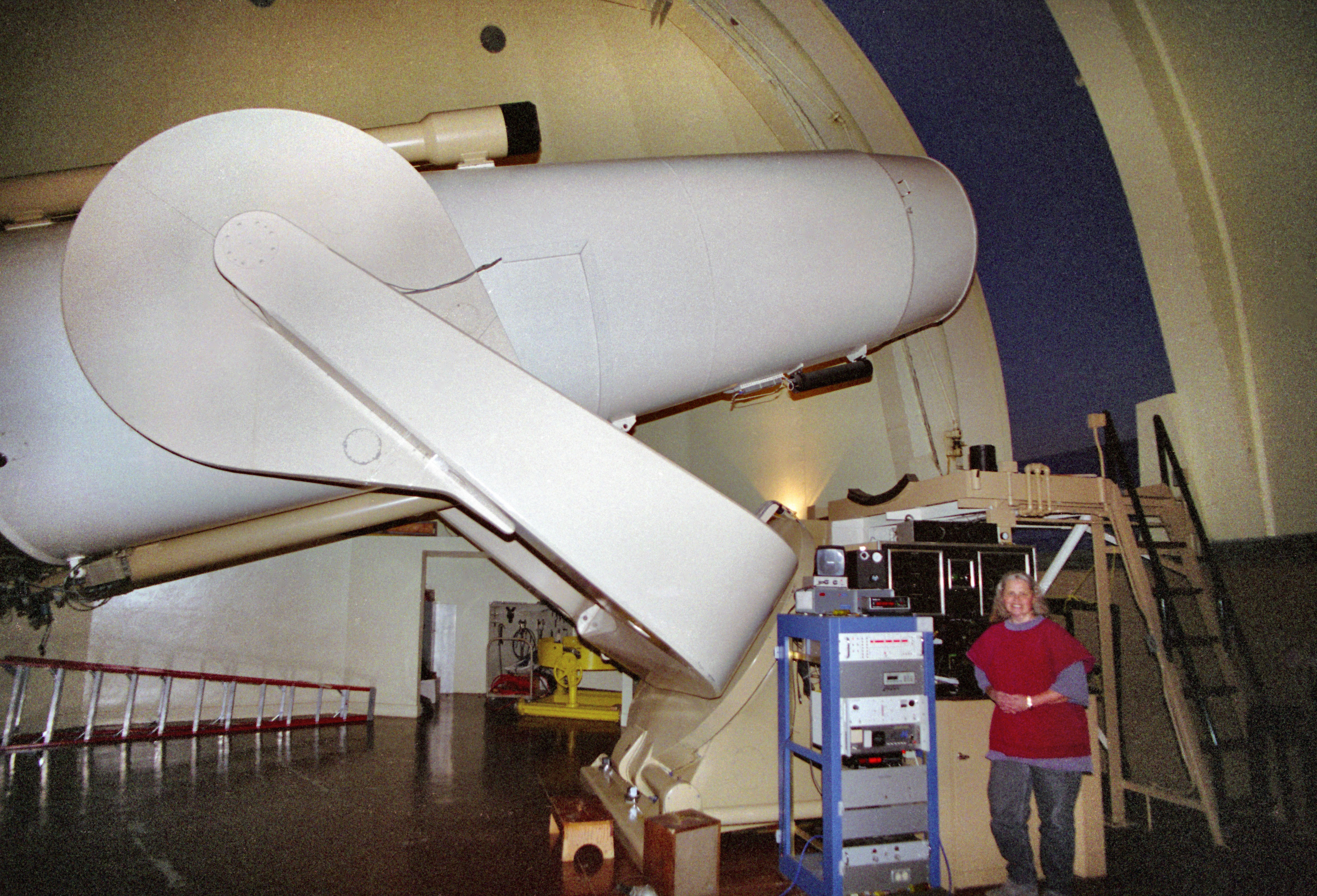
The 1.2-meter Samuel Oschin telescope that was used to discover Máni at Palomar Observatory

Discovery images of Máni from 18 June 2002

=== Further observations ===
Since receiving follow-up in August 2002, Máni remained unobserved for more than nine months until it was recovered by Trujillo at Palomar Observatory on 29 May 2003, followed by observations by Wolf Bickel at Bergisch Gladbach Observatory in Germany in June 2003. These recovery observations significantly reduced the uncertainty of Máni's orbit, allowing for further extrapolation of its position backwards in time for identification in precovery observations. Seven precovery observations from Digitized Sky Survey plates were identified by astronomer Andrew Lowe in 2007; the earliest of these was taken on 8 April 1954 by Palomar Observatory. As of 2025, Máni has been observed for over 68 years, or about 25% of its orbital period.

=== Numbering and naming ===
The object received its permanent minor planet catalog number of 307261 from the Minor Planet Center on 10 December 2011. On 9 June 2025, it was officially named "Máni" by the International Astronomical Union's Working Group for Small Bodies Nomenclature (WGSBN). According to the naming citation, "Máni is a personification of the Moon from Old Norse as described in the Prose Edda. Máni is the son of Mundilfari and the brother of Sól, the Sun." This name follows the WGSBN's recommended naming theme of mythological creation figures for classical Kuiper belt objects.

== Orbit and classification ==
Máni is a trans-Neptunian object (TNO) orbiting the Sun beyond Neptune with an orbital period of 269 years. Its semi-major axis or average orbital distance from the Sun is 41.7 astronomical units (AU), with a moderate orbital eccentricity of 0.15. In its eccentric orbit, Máni comes within 35.7 AU from the Sun at perihelion and 47.8 AU at aphelion. It has an orbital inclination of nearly 18° with respect to the ecliptic. Máni last passed perihelion in April 1853, passed aphelion in February 1987, and will make its next perihelion passage in June 2123.

Máni is located in the classical region of the Kuiper belt 37–48 AU from the Sun, and is thus classified as a classical Kuiper belt object (or sometimes a "cubewano"). Máni's high orbital inclination qualifies it as a dynamically "hot" member of the classical Kuiper belt, which implies that it was gravitationally scattered to its present location by Neptune's outward planetary migration in the Solar System's early history. Máni's present orbit is far enough from Neptune (minimum orbit intersection distance 6.6 AU) that it no longer experiences scattering from close encounters with the planet.

A dynamical study in 2007 simulated Máni's orbital evolution over a 10-million-year timespan and found that it may be in an intermittent 18:11 mean-motion orbital resonance with Neptune, which seems to cause irregular fluctations in Máni's orbital inclination and eccentricity. Despite this, researchers do not consider Máni to be in resonance with Neptune.

The 18:11-resonant libration of Máni's nominal orbit, in a frame co-rotating with Neptune

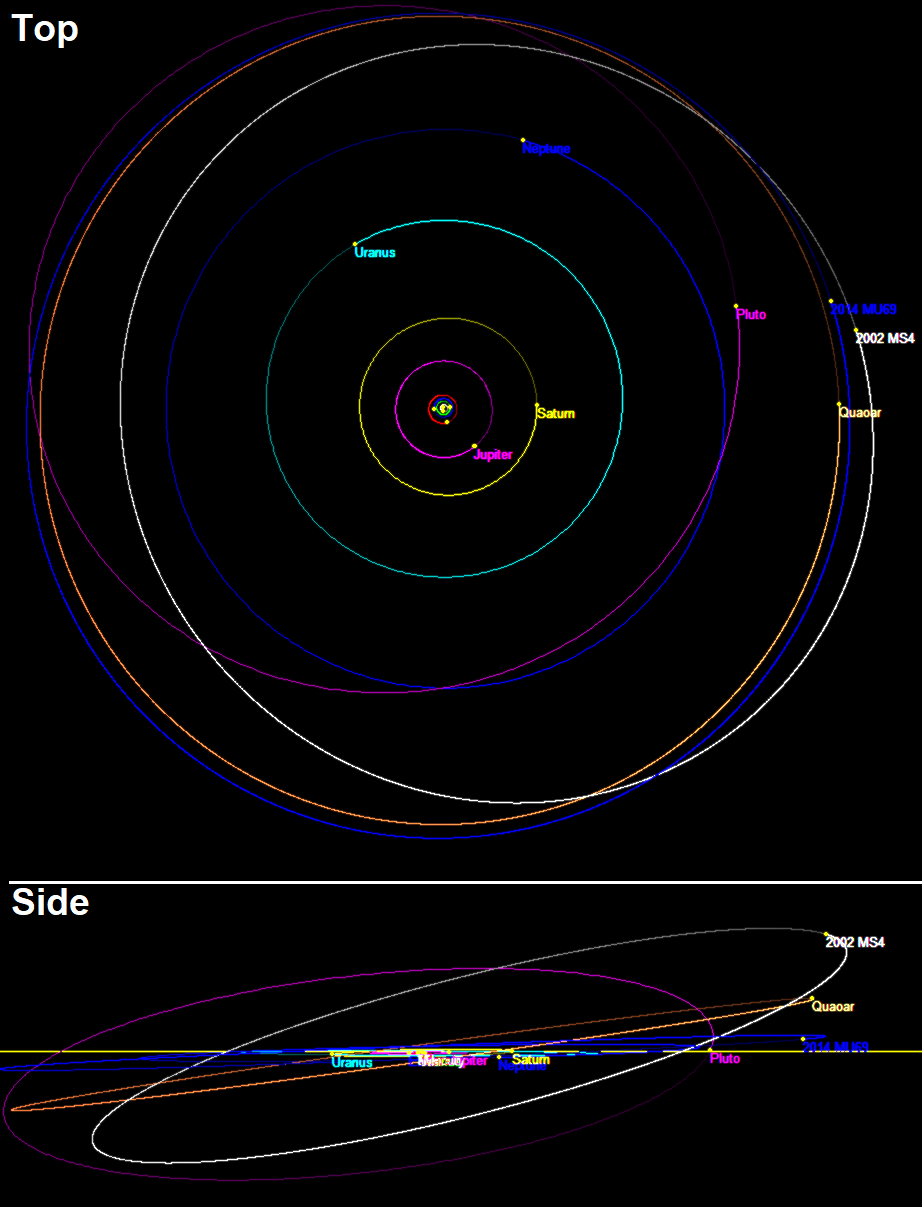
Top and side views of Máni's orbit (white) with Pluto and other classical Kuiper belt objects for comparison

== Observability ==
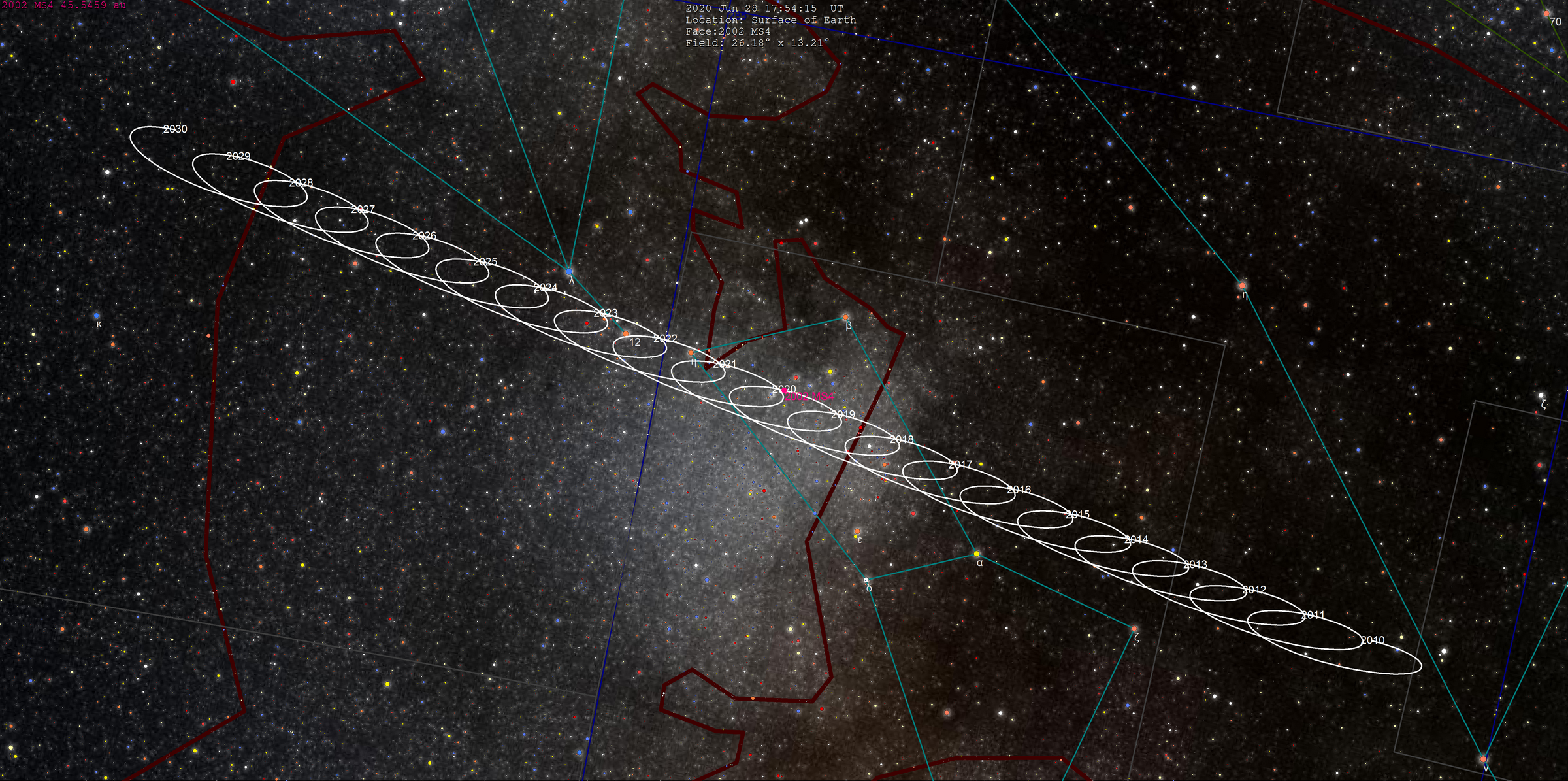
Máni's position in the constellation Scutum in 2020, moving eastward (left) across the brightest areas of the Milky Way

In the night sky, Máni is located near the Milky Way's Galactic Center in the southern celestial hemisphere. It has been passing through that region's dense field of background stars since its discovery. Combined with Máni's faint apparent magnitude of 20.5 as seen from Earth, its crowded location can make observations difficult. On the other hand, Máni's location makes it viable for observing stellar occultations as there are numerous stars for it to pass in front of.

=== Occultations ===
Máni occultations observed in 2019–2022
Date	Star apparent magnitude (V-band)	Positive detections	Negative detections (Note: Telescopes that were affected by poor weather or technical problems are not counted as negative detections.)	Number of telescope locations (Note: Telescopes that are located in the same place or are located very close together are considered single locations.)	Continents observed
09 Jul 2019	15.00	2	4	10	South America
26 Jul 2019	17.78	3	0	3	South America
26 Jul 2019	15.45	1	0	1	North America
19 Aug 2019	16.51	2	0	2	North America
26 Jul 2020	14.76	2	0	5	Africa
8 Aug 2020	14.62	61	40	116	Europe, Africa, Asia
24 Feb 2021	16.51	1	1	2	South America
14 Oct 2021	15.83	2	0	14	North America
10 Jun 2022	15.1	3	0	3	North America, Africa

Stellar occultations by Máni occur when it passes in front of a star and blocks its light, causing the star to dim for several seconds until Máni emerges. Observing stellar occultations by Máni can provide accurate measurements for its position, shape, and size. Due to parallax between Earth, Máni, and the occulted star, occultations by Máni may only be observable to certain locations on Earth. For this reason, Máni's orbital trajectory and ephemeris must be accurately known before occultation predictions can be reliably made.

To facilitate occultation predictions for Máni, astronomers of the European Research Council's Lucky Star project gathered astrometric observations of Máni from 2009–2019 to reduce its orbital uncertainty and utilized the Gaia catalogues for high-precision positions of stars. From 2019 to 2022, the Lucky Star project organized campaigns for astronomers worldwide to observe the predicted occultations by Máni, yielding nine successfully observed occultations by the end of the period. The first successfully observed occultation by Máni took place in South America on 9 July 2019, which yielded two positive detections and four negative detections from the 10 participating telescope locations; the remaining four telescopes were affected by poor weather. Additional successful observations of Máni's occultations took place on 26 July and 19 August 2019, which provided more accurate astrometry that helped refine later occultation predictions.

On 8 August 2020, the Lucky Star project organized a large observing campaign for Máni, which would occult a relatively bright star of apparent magnitude 14.6 and be observable over densely populated regions in multiple continents. A total of 116 telescope locations from Europe, North Africa, and Western Asia participated in the campaign and yielded 61 positive detections and 40 negative detections, with the remaining 15 telescopes inhibited by poor weather or technical difficulties. The observers of the occultation found no evidence of rings, cometary jets, or natural satellites around Máni. This is the most extensive participation in a TNO occultation campaign as of 2023. Thanks to the large amount of positive detections across various locations, the global shape outline and topography of Máni could be seen clearly for the first time.

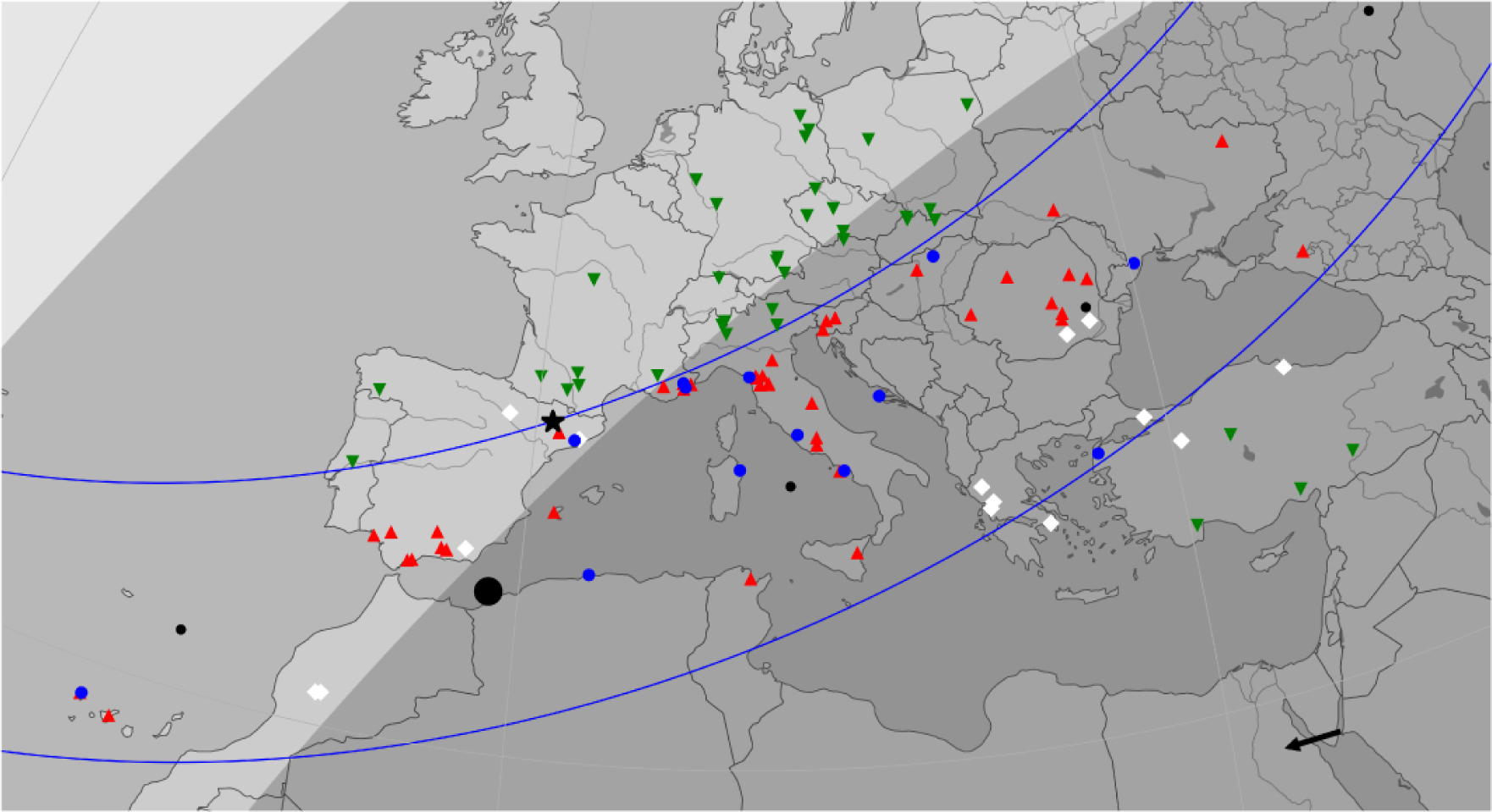
Map showing the location of telescopes that participated in the 8 August 2020 occultation campaign. Telescopes within the path of Máni's shadow (region between the two solid blue curves) made positive detections (blue and red points), whereas telescopes outside the path made negative detections (green points).

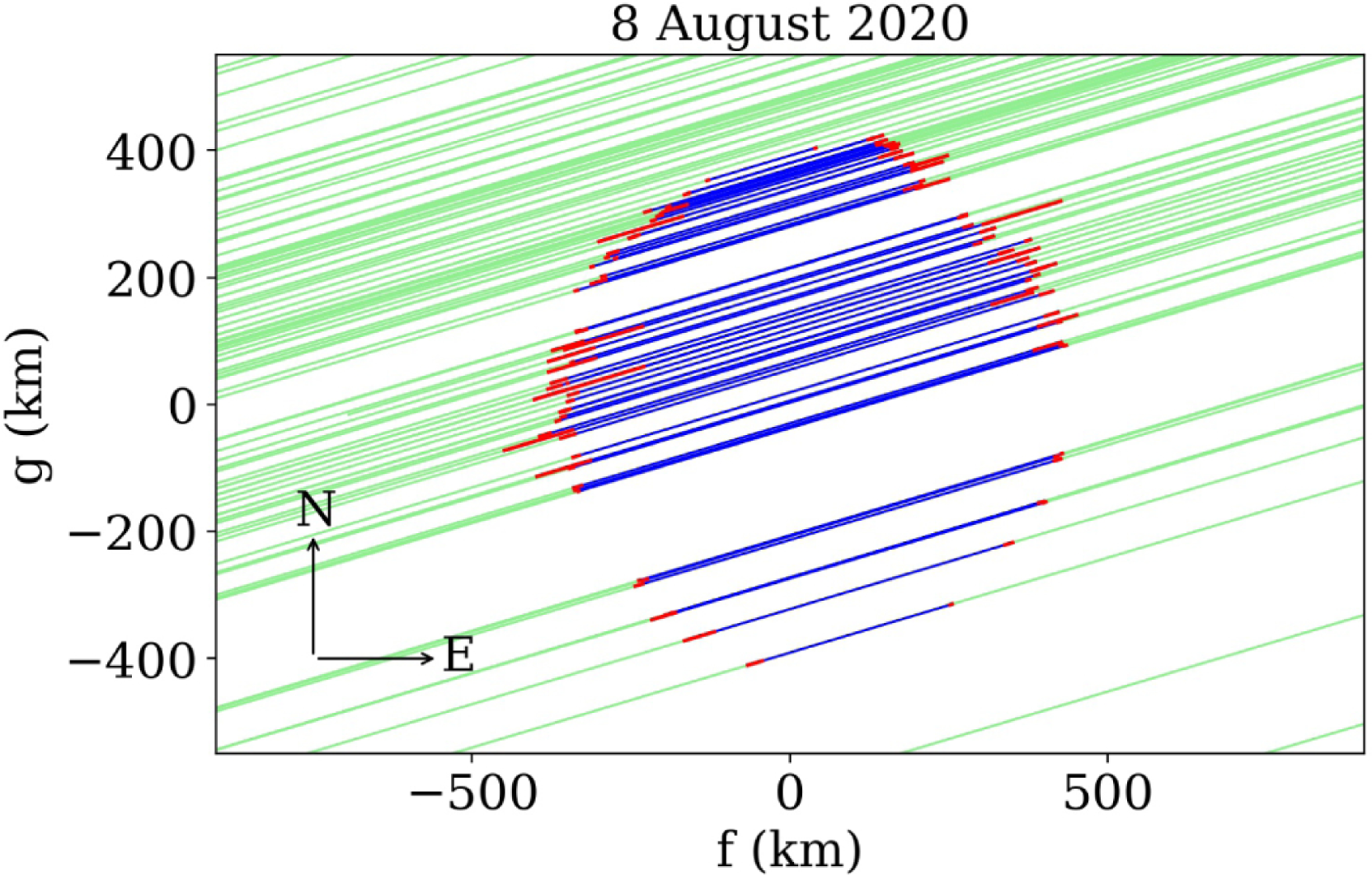
Máni's projected shape revealed by the many positive detection chords from the 8 August 2020 occultation (blue with red error bars). A massive topographic peak and depression is visible along Máni's limb in the northeast direction.

== Physical characteristics ==
History of diameter estimates for Máni
Year of Publication	Diameter (km)	Method	References
2008	726.2+123.2 −122.9	thermal (Spitzer)	
2009	730+118 −120	thermal (Spitzer, remodeled)	
2012	934±47	thermal (Herschel)	(Note: The overestimated thermally-measured diameter of 934±47 km is now thought to be the result of Máni emitting excess thermal radiation, possibly due to a moon.)
2020	770±2	occultation (9 Jul 2019)	
2022	<810±70	occultation (26 Jul 2019)	
2023	796±24	occultation (8 Aug 2020)	(Note: Rommel et al. previously reported a diameter of 800±24 km in a 2021 conference talk about their preliminary 8 August 2020 occultation results. This preliminary diameter estimate has been superseded by the more recent estimate of 796±24 km in their paper published in 2023.)

Results from the extensively observed 8 August 2020 occultation show that Máni has a shape resembling an oblate spheroid, with an equatorial diameter of 824 ± 20 km (512 ± 12 mi) and a polar diameter of up to 770 ± 34 km (478 ± 21 mi). Máni's mean diameter is 796 ± 24 km (495 ± 15 mi), which is between the diameters of the two largest asteroids, Ceres (940 km; 580 mi) and Vesta (520 km; 320 mi). It is unknown whether Máni's equator is being viewed obliquely or edge-on from Earth's perspective, so it is possible that the object's actual polar diameter may be smaller, or have a greater oblateness, than observed in the August 2020 occultation. Máni is the 10th (or 11th if counting Pluto's moon Charon) largest known TNO. Because of its large size, it is a candidate dwarf planet.

The mass and density of Máni is unknown since it has no known moons. Without a known mass and density, it is not possible to determine the porosity and ice-to-rock ratio of its interior. If Máni is in hydrostatic equilibrium, its density could be predicted from its oblateness and rotation period, although both of these properties are poorly known. Assuming a Maclaurin spheroid as the equilibrium shape for Máni, the ranges of possible densities are 0.72–8.0 g/cm^{3} and 0.36–3.9 g/cm^{3} for possible rotation periods of 7.44 and 10.44 hours, respectively. Máni falls within the 400–1,000 km (250–620 mi) diameter range where TNOs are typically observed with densities lower than that of water ice (1 g/cm^{3}); these TNOs are theorized to have porous interior structures due to a lack of internal melting and gravitational compression.

=== Surface ===
Comparison of sizes, albedos, and colors of various large trans-Neptunian objects with diameters greater than 700 km (430 mi). Máni is shown on the middle row, second from the right. The light and dark colored arcs represent uncertainties of the object's size.

Máni has a gray or spectrally neutral surface color, meaning it reflects similar amounts of light for wavelengths across the visible spectrum. The surface of Máni is dark, having a low geometric albedo of 0.1. Near-infrared spectroscopy by the James Webb Space Telescope in 2022 has shown that Máni's surface is rich in crystalline water ice, amorphous water ice, and carbon dioxide ice, but lacks volatile and hydrocarbon substances like methane. This composition makes Máni a member of a "prominent water" (H_{2}O)-type TNOs, which includes the large Kuiper belt objects Orcus, Salacia, and Achlys.

Among the H_{2}O-type TNOs, the largest members including Máni display comparatively high concentrations of surface water ice. A 2025 study led by Ian Wong speculated that their concentrated surface water ice may have come from cryovolcanism. A preliminary 2023 analysis by Jason Cook and collaborators suggests that Máni's surface water ice consists of micrometer-sized grains, while its carbon dioxide ice consists of a mix of coarser, micrometer-sized grains to finer, sub-micrometer-sized grains. New Horizons observations of Máni's phase curve indicate that the icy regolith grains on the object's surface are rough and irregularly shaped.

=== Topography ===
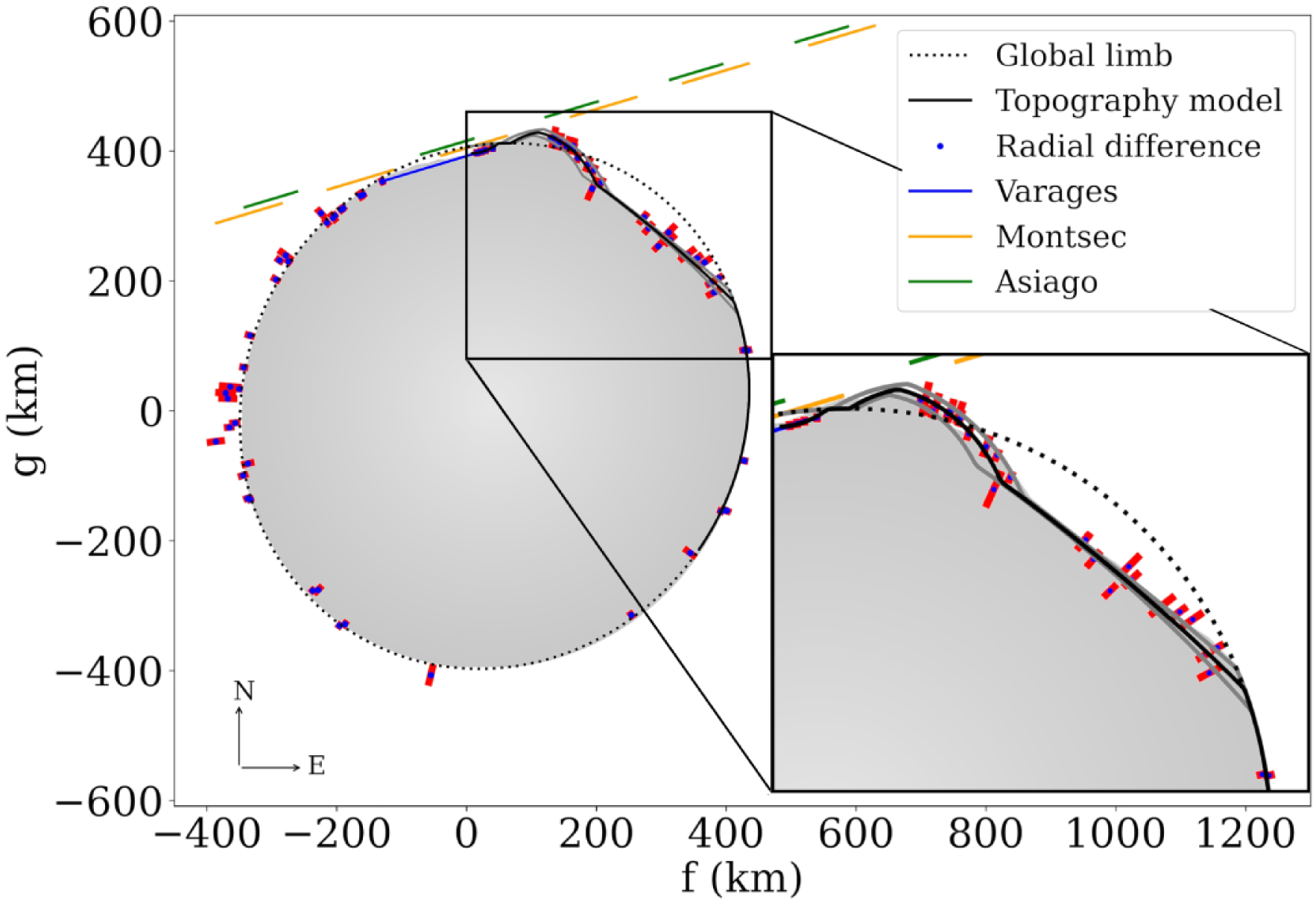
Projected shape of Máni seen in the 8 August 2020 occultation

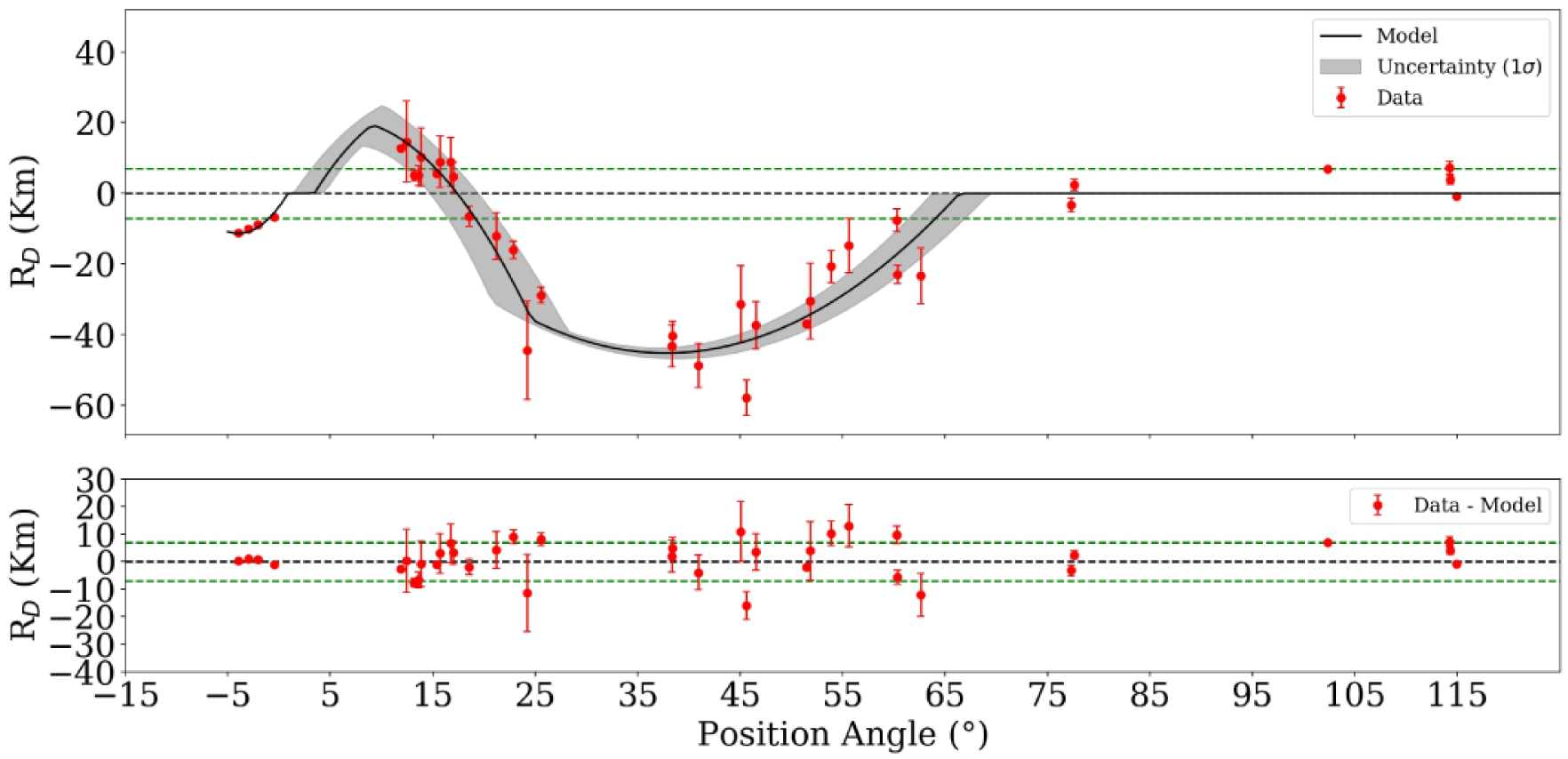
Plot of topographic elevation variations along Máni's limb

The 8 August 2020 occultation revealed massive topographic features along Máni's northeastern outline, or limb, which notably includes a crater-like depression 322 ± 39 km (200 ± 24 mi) wide and 45.1 ± 1.5 km (28.02 ± 0.93 mi) deep, and a 25+4
−5 km (15.5+2.5
−3.1 mi)-tall peak near the rim of the depression. Another depression feature about 10 km (6.2 mi) wide and 11 km (6.8 mi) deep was detected by a single telescope from Varages, France during the occultation; this depression feature partially occulted the star as Máni emerged, which resulted in the star brightening gradually instead of instantly. The elevations of these observed topographic features lie beyond the maximum elevation of 6–7 km (3.7–4.3 mi) expected for an icy body of Máni's size, signifying that the object may have experienced a large impact in its past. It would be possible for Máni to support its massive topographic features if its material strength increases toward its core. Topographic features on other TNOs have been previously observed through occultation, such as 208996 Achlys which has a depression feature at least 8 km (5 mi) deep.

The topographic peak on Máni has a height comparable to Mars's tallest mountain, Olympus Mons, and the central mound of the Rheasilvia crater on asteroid Vesta. If Máni's topographic peak is a mountain, then it would qualify as one of the tallest known mountains in the Solar System. If Máni's massive depression is a crater, then it would be the first observation of a massive crater on a TNO. The depression's width takes up about 40% of Máni's diameter, which is comparable to the largest crater-to-diameter ratios seen in Saturn's moons Tethys and Iapetus. For context, Tethys's largest crater Odysseus takes up about 43% of its diameter, while Iapetus's largest crater Turgis takes up about 40% of its diameter, but they are much shallower than the purported Máni crater. The trans-Neptunian dwarf planet Pluto and its moon Charon do not exhibit such large craters on the other hand, (Note: Pluto has an over-1,000 km (620 mi)-wide ice-covered basin named Sputnik Planitia, although it is unclear whether it originated from an impact.) as their largest crater-to-diameter ratios are 10.5% and 18.9%, respectively. The depth of Máni's massive depression takes up 5.7% of Máni's diameter and exceeds those seen in the largest craters of other Solar System bodies of comparable size: the largest crater of Saturn's moon Mimas has a depth of up to 10–12 km (6.2–7.5 mi) and Vesta's Rheasilvia crater has a depth of up to 25 km (16 mi).

=== Rotation and light curve ===
The rotation period of Máni is uncertain and its rotational axial tilt is unknown. It is difficult to measure Máni's rotation period photometrically with telescopes on Earth since the object is obscured in a dense field of background stars. Due to Máni's spheroidal shape and possible surface albedo variations, its light curve only exhibits very small fluctuations in brightness (amplitude 0.05–0.12 mag) over time as it rotates. The first attempts at measuring Máni's rotation were made with the Sierra Nevada Observatory's 1.5-meter telescope in August 2005, but it did not observe the object long enough to identify any periodicities in its light curve. Subsequent observations by the Galileo National Telescope in June–July 2011 took advantage of Máni passing in front of a dark nebula, which enabled it to determine possible periods of either 7.33 hours or 10.44 hours. On the other hand, observations by the Canada–France–Hawaii Telescope in July–August 2013 measured a rotation period of 14.251 hours, with other less probable rotation period aliases of 8.932 and 5.881 hours.

== Possible satellite ==
Máni is not known to have natural satellites or moons, although there is indirect evidence for one orbiting close to it. Beginning in 2023 (after the determination of Máni's diameter via occultations), astronomers noticed that Máni emits more thermal radiation than expected for its size. Máni's excess thermal emission does not fit with a single, highly emissive object, but could be explained if it had a thermally-emitting moon. Based on the difference between Máni's measured and predicted thermal emission, the diameter of its possible moon is inferred to be 534+58
−54 km (332+36
−34 mi)—about two-thirds the diameter of Máni. Such a large moon would make Máni a binary system, whose origin likely comes from either streaming instability or an impact.

Hubble Space Telescope images from 2006 showed no moon around Máni. Occultation observations from 2020 also showed no moon within 1,000 km (620 mi) of Máni, although it is possible that the moon may have been hidden behind or in front of Máni during those observations. In a 2023 study, astronomers briefly considered the possibility that Máni's topographic peak may be a 213 km (132 mi)-diameter moon passing behind or in front of Máni, but dismissed it as unlikely. A moon of this size would not be large enough to explain Máni's excess thermal emission.

== Exploration ==
=== New Horizons ===
The New Horizons spacecraft observed Máni during 2016–2019, as part of its extended Kuiper belt mission after its successful Pluto flyby in 2015. Máni was 15.3 AU (2.29 billion km; 1.42 billion mi) away from the spacecraft when it began observations on 13 July 2016, and was 12.0 AU (1.80 billion km; 1.12 billion mi) away from the spacecraft when it ended observations on 1 September 2019. New Horizons had the unique vantage point of observing Máni and other TNOs while it was inside the Kuiper belt, which allowed the spacecraft to observe these objects at high phase angles (>2°) that are not observable from Earth. By observing how Máni's brightness changes as a function of phase angle, the object's phase curve could be determined, which can reveal the light scattering properties of Máni's surface regolith. In addition to significantly improving the knowledge of Máni's phase curve, the observations by New Horizons also significantly improved the precision of Máni's orbit.

Máni imaged by the New Horizons spacecraft in July 2016, from a distance of 15.3 AU (2.3 billion km; 1.4 billion mi)

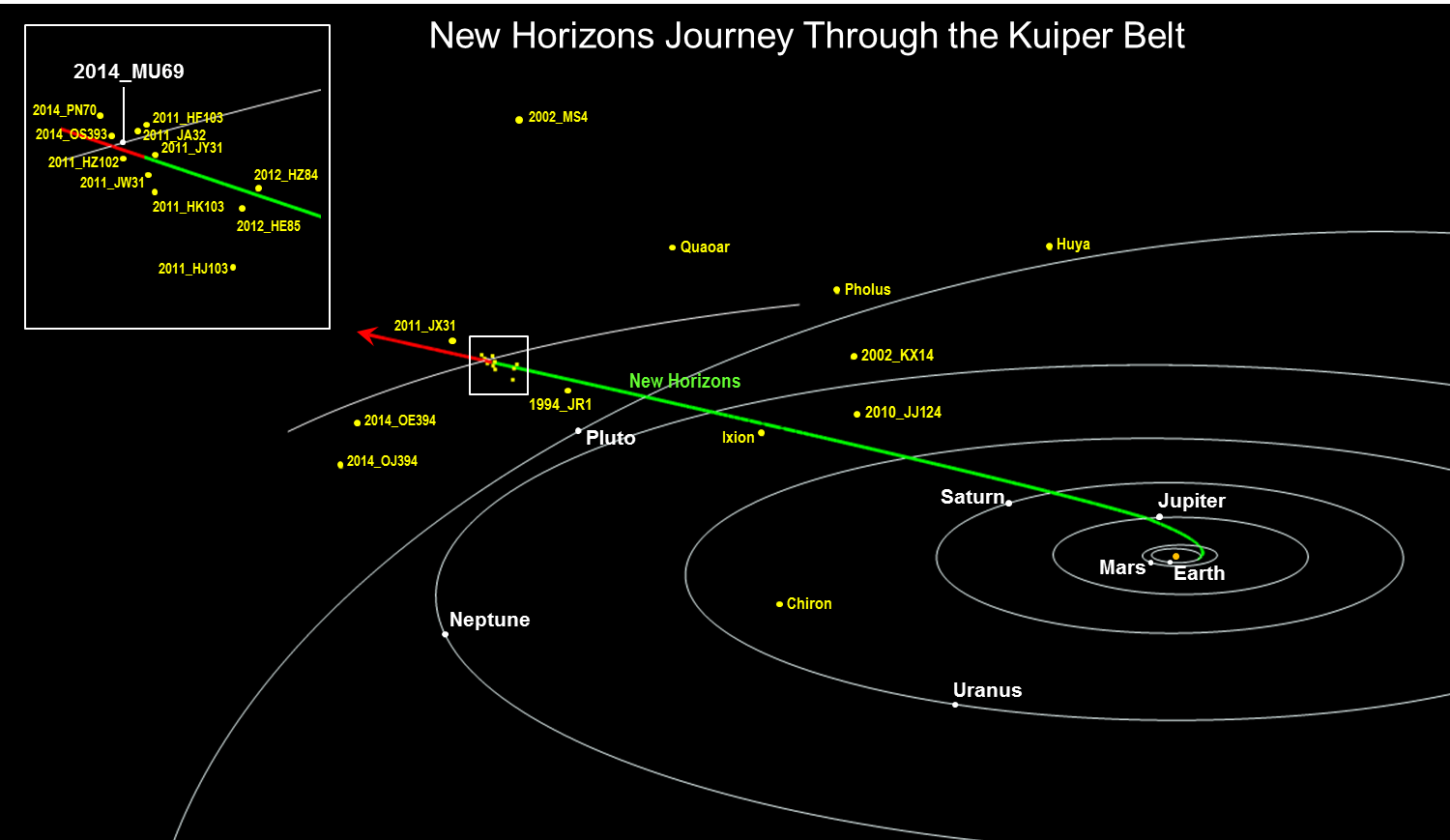
New Horizons trajectory through the Kuiper belt, with positions of nearby KBOs including Máni (2002 MS_{4}) labeled

=== Proposed ===
Máni has been considered as a possible exploration target for future missions to the Kuiper belt and beyond, such as NASA's Interstellar Probe concept. A 2019 study by Amanda Zangari and collaborators identified several possible trajectories to Máni for a spacecraft that would be launched in 2025–2040. For a spacecraft launched in 2027–2031, a single gravity assist from Jupiter could bring a spacecraft to Máni over a minimum duration of 9.1–12.8 years, depending on the excess launch energy of the spacecraft. Another trajectory using a single Jupiter gravity assist for a 2040 launch date could bring a spacecraft to Máni over a minimum duration of 13 years. A 2038–2040 launch trajectory using a single Saturn gravity assist could bring a spacecraft to Máni over a minimum duration of 16.7 years, while a 2038–2040 launch trajectory using two gravity assists from Jupiter and Saturn could bring a spacecraft to Máni over a minimum duration of 18.6–19.5 years.

== See also ==
- 120347 Salacia, a binary dwarf planet candidate in the Kuiper belt that is similar to Máni in size and composition
- List of Solar System objects by size
