= Henry G. Roe =

American astronomer

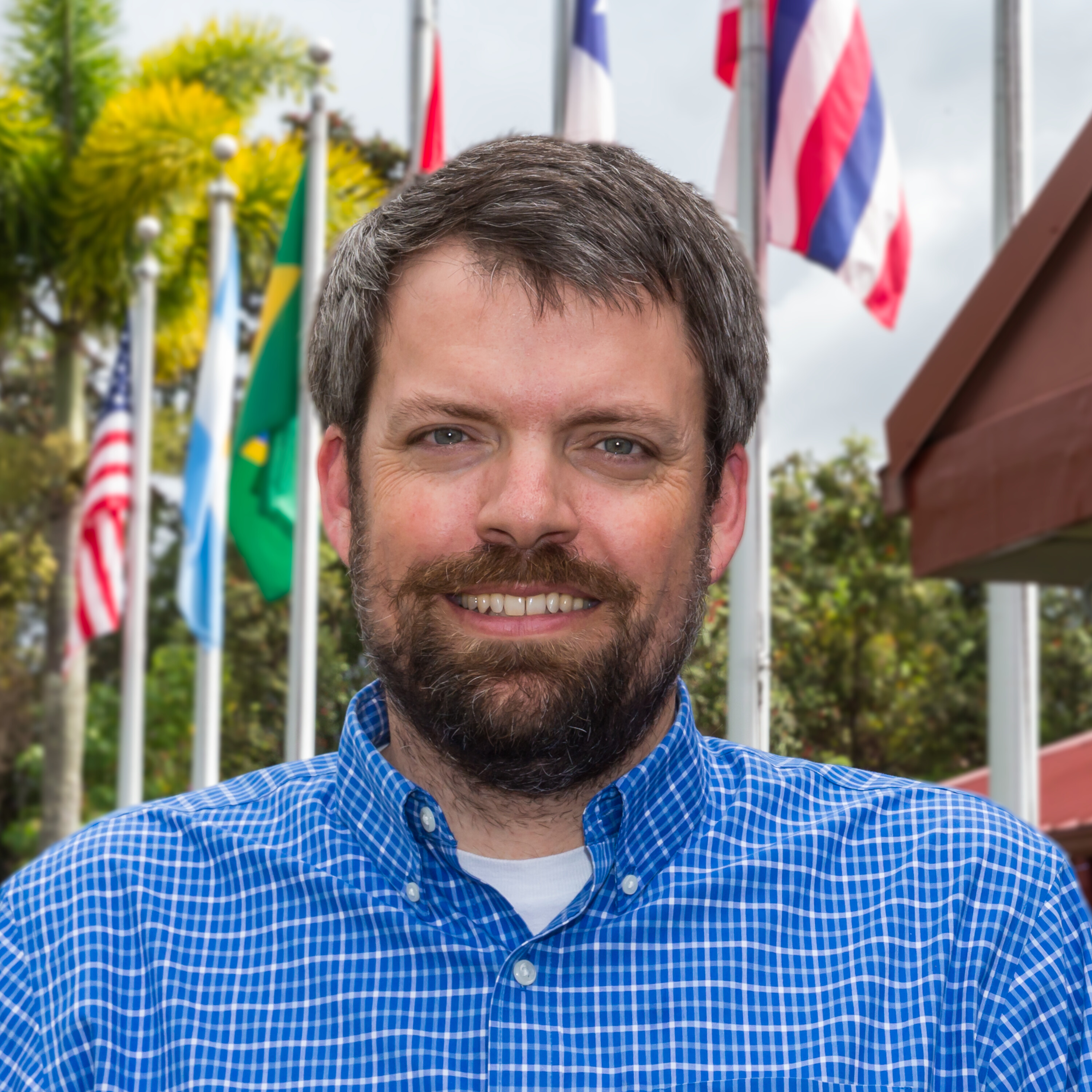
- Born: 1975 (age 50–51)
- Education: Williams College (B.Sc., 1997); University of California, Berkeley (Ph.D., 2002)
- Occupations: Astronomer, Researcher
- Board member of: International Astronomical Union

Henry G. Roe (born 1975) is an American astronomer who previously worked at the Lowell Observatory. The Minor Planet Center credits him with the discovery of the trans-Neptunian object 120347 Salacia made on 22 September 2004 with the collaboration of Kristina M. Barkume and Michael E. Brown. Additionally, the asteroid 28803 Roe was named in his honor.

Roe received a Bachelor of Science in chemistry from Williams College in 1997, followed by a Doctor of Philosophy in astrophysics from the University of California, Berkeley in 2002.
