= José Luis Ortiz Moreno =

Spanish astronomer

Minor planets discovered: 1
| 416252 Manuelherrera | 5 March 2003 | list |
* discovery credited to the Sierra Nevada Obs. (Note: As of 2016, the Minor Planet Center credits the Sierra Nevada Observatory in Spain with the discovery of the minor planet and dwarf planet Haumea (MPC).)

José Luis Ortiz Moreno (born 1967) is a Spanish astronomer, and former vice director of Technology at the Instituto de Astrofísica de Andalucía (IAA), Spain. He leads a team working on minor planets at the Sierra Nevada Observatory in Granada, Spain, and was involved in the 2017 discovery of a ring system around the dwarf planet Haumea. The main-belt asteroid 4436 Ortizmoreno was named in his honor.

== Discovery of Haumea ==
On July 29, 2005, Ortiz announced the discovery of Haumea, provisional designation 2003 EL_{61}, one of the few officially recognized dwarf planets of the Solar System. This led to a controversy over who to credit for the discovery: Michael E. Brown and his team at Caltech had also been observing Haumea, and for a longer period of time than Ortiz, but had withheld publication pending securing its orbital parameters. Brown initially supported Ortiz and his team being given credit for the discovery, but withdrew that support when it turned out that Ortiz had accessed Brown's public observation logs and research just before announcing the discovery. Additional information was provided that showed that Ortiz and his team only started researching this object after looking at Brown's Caltech telescope files. After ignoring requests from Brown and only after a complaint was filed with the International Astronomical Union (IAU), did Ortiz finally respond to the accusation. Ortiz maintained that he only did so to see if this was the same object that his team had been tracking. The IAU did not award credit to either party, but listed the Spanish observatory as the place of discovery, and accepted the Caltech suggested name of Haumea rather than Ortiz's Ataecina. Ortiz is mentioned in Brown's memoir How I Killed Pluto and Why It Had It Coming.
