= List of scientific debates =

This is a list of notable scientific debates in the history of science and mathematics.

== Biology ==
- Nature versus nurture, long-standing debate in biology on human behavior
- 1764–1778 Voltaire vs Needham, between Voltaire and John Needham and others on the validity of preformationism.
- 1830 Cuvier–Geoffroy debate between Georges Cuvier and Étienne Geoffroy Saint-Hilaire on animal structure.
- 1860 Oxford evolution debate between several scientists on Charles Darwin's On the Origin of Species.
- 1860–1862 Great Hippocampus Question, between Thomas Henry Huxley and Richard Owen on the importance of hippocampus minor.

== Chemistry and nanoscience ==
- 2001–2003 Drexler–Smalley debate on molecular nanotechnology by K. Eric Drexler and Richard Smalley on the feasibility of molecular assemblers.

== Mathematics ==
- 1654–1665 problem of points, correspondence between Blaise Pascal and Pierre de Fermat on games and the fair share of a prize pot.
- 1655–1679 Hobbes–Wallis controversy, between Thomas Hobbes and John Wallis on geometry and other topics.
- 1745 Leibniz–Bernoulli correspondence, between Gottfried Wilhelm Leibniz and Johann Bernoulli on the logarithm of negative numbers.
- 1902–1924 Nekrasov–Markov conflict, between Pavel Nekrasov and Andrey Markov on the relation between the law of large numbers and free will.
- 1903–1912 Poincaré vs. Russell, between Henri Poincaré and Bertrand Russell on logicism and mathematical paradoxes.
- 1907–1928 Brouwer–Hilbert foundational debate or Grundlagenstreit, between L. E. J. Brouwer and David Hilbert on foundations of mathematics.

== Physics and astronomy ==
- 1715–1716 Leibniz–Clarke correspondence, between Gottfried Wilhelm Leibniz and Samuel Clarke on space being absolute.
- 1857–1901 Kelvin–Stokes aether drag debate, on whether the luminiferous aether was unstable when considered a perfect fluid. Debate between Lord Kelvin and George Stokes.
- 1895 Lübeck Debate between Ludwig Boltzmann and Wilhelm Ostwald on the existence of atoms.
- 1920 Great Debate (astronomy) between Harlow Shapley and Heber Curtis on the scale of spiral nebulae and the Universe.
- 1920 Bad Nauheim Debate, between Philipp Lenard and Albert Einstein on the validity of general relativity. See also Criticism of the theory of relativity.
- 1922 Einstein–Bergson debate between Albert Einstein and philosopher Henri Bergson, on the implications of theory of relativity and the nature of time.
- 1927–1935 Bohr–Einstein debates between Albert Einstein and Niels Bohr on interpretations of quantum mechanics.
- 1936–1944 Chandrasekhar–Eddington dispute, between Subrahmanyan Chandrasekhar and Arthur Eddington on the limits of star masses.
- 1949–1964 Big Bang vs. steady-state, dispute between Fred Hoyle supporter of the steady-state model of the universe and George Gamow supporter of the Big Bang.

== Philosophy of science ==
- 1965 Kuhn–Popper debate between philosophers Thomas Kuhn and Karl Popper on scientific research methodology.
- 1990s Science wars, series of debates on the role of natural sciences over social sciences

== Science education ==
- 1989 Math wars, series of debates on the mathematics education curriculum in the United States

== Theology and science ==
- 2014 Bill Nye–Ken Ham debate by Bill Nye and Ken Ham on science and creationism and evolution.

== See also ==
- List of scientific priority disputes
