= 120347 Salacia =

Possible dwarf planet

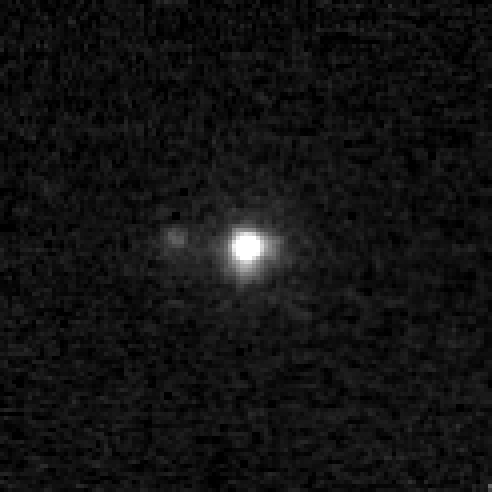
- Keck Telescope image of Salacia (center) and its moon Actaea (left), taken by the NIRC2 near-infrared camera on 3 August 2010.

Discovery
- Discovered by: H. G. Roe; M. E. Brown; K. M. Barkume
- Discovery site: Palomar Obs.
- Discovery date: 22 September 2004

Designations
- Pronunciation: /səˈleɪʃə/ (sə-LAY-shə)
- Named after: Salacia (Roman mythology)
- Alternative designations: 2004 SB_{60}
- Minor planet category: TNO · classical (hot) extended
- Adjectives: Salacian
- Symbol: or (rare)

Orbital characteristics
- Epoch 31 May 2020 (JD 2459000.5)
- Uncertainty parameter 3
- Observation arc: 37.16 yr (13,572 days)
- Earliest precovery date: 25 July 1982
- Aphelion: 46.670 AU
- Perihelion: 37.697 AU
- Semi-major axis: 42.184 AU
- Eccentricity: 0.10636
- Orbital period (sidereal): 273.98 yr (100,073 days)
- Mean anomaly: 123.138°
- Mean motion: 0° 0^{m} 12.951^{s} / day
- Inclination: 23.921°
- Longitude of ascending node: 279.880°
- Argument of perihelion: 312.294°
- Known satellites: 1 (Actaea)

Physical characteristics
- Mean diameter: 838±44 km
- Mass: 4.861+0.076 −0.074×10^{20} kg (Total system mass)
- Mean density: ≈1.45 g/cm^{3} (7 September 2025) (Note: assuming equal densities for the both objects); 1.38+0.22 −0.18 g/cm^{3} (2 September 2025) (Note: assuming equal densities for the both bodies, using the old size estimate of 866±37 km and 290±21 km for Salacia and Actaea respectively.); 1.50±0.12 g/cm^{3} (2019)
- Sidereal rotation period: 5.49403±0.00016 d (synchronous)
- Geometric albedo: 0.041±0.004 (2025)
- Spectral type: Prominent water (H_{2}O-type); BB (neutral); B−V = 0.66±0.06; V−R = 0.40±0.04
- Apparent magnitude: 20.80±0.04
- Absolute magnitude (H): 4.360±0.011 (Salacia+Actaea); 4.476±0.013 (Salacia); 4.15

120347 Salacia (provisional designation 2004 SB_{60}) is a large trans-Neptunian object in the Kuiper belt. It was discovered on 22 September 2004 by American astronomers Henry G. Roe, Michael E. Brown, and Kristina Barkume using the Hale Reflector at the Palomar Observatory. Its discovery was officially announced in May 2005. Salacia orbits the Sun at an average distance slightly greater than that of Pluto, and is classified as a hot cubewano or a scattered–extended object. It was named after the Roman sea goddess Salacia.

Salacia is a possible dwarf planet with an estimated diameter of 838±44 km, and a low light curve, implying a nearly spherical shape. While older size estimates suggested a low density and highly porous interior, newer measurements calculate a higher density between 1.45 g/cm^{3} and 1.50±0.12 g/cm^{3}. It has a dark gray surface with a neutral color index and an exceptionally low albedo of 0.041±0.004. This low albedo indicates a lack of geological activity. Observations by the James Webb Space Telescope (JWST) showed that water ice makes up less than 5% of its surface, detecting both amorphous and crystalline water ice alongside carbon dioxide ice. It lacks volatile super-ices like methane, placing it in the "prominent water" (H_{2}O-type) TNO group alongside objects like 307261 Máni and 90482 Orcus.

Salacia has one known moon, Actaea, and their combined system mass is 4.861+0.076
−0.074×10^{20} kg. The primary body and its moon form a fully tidally locked system with a synchronous rotation period of 5.49 days, similar to the Pluto–Charon system. The two bodies will pass directly in front of each other during a rare mutual occultation season starting in 2067.

== History ==
=== Discovery ===
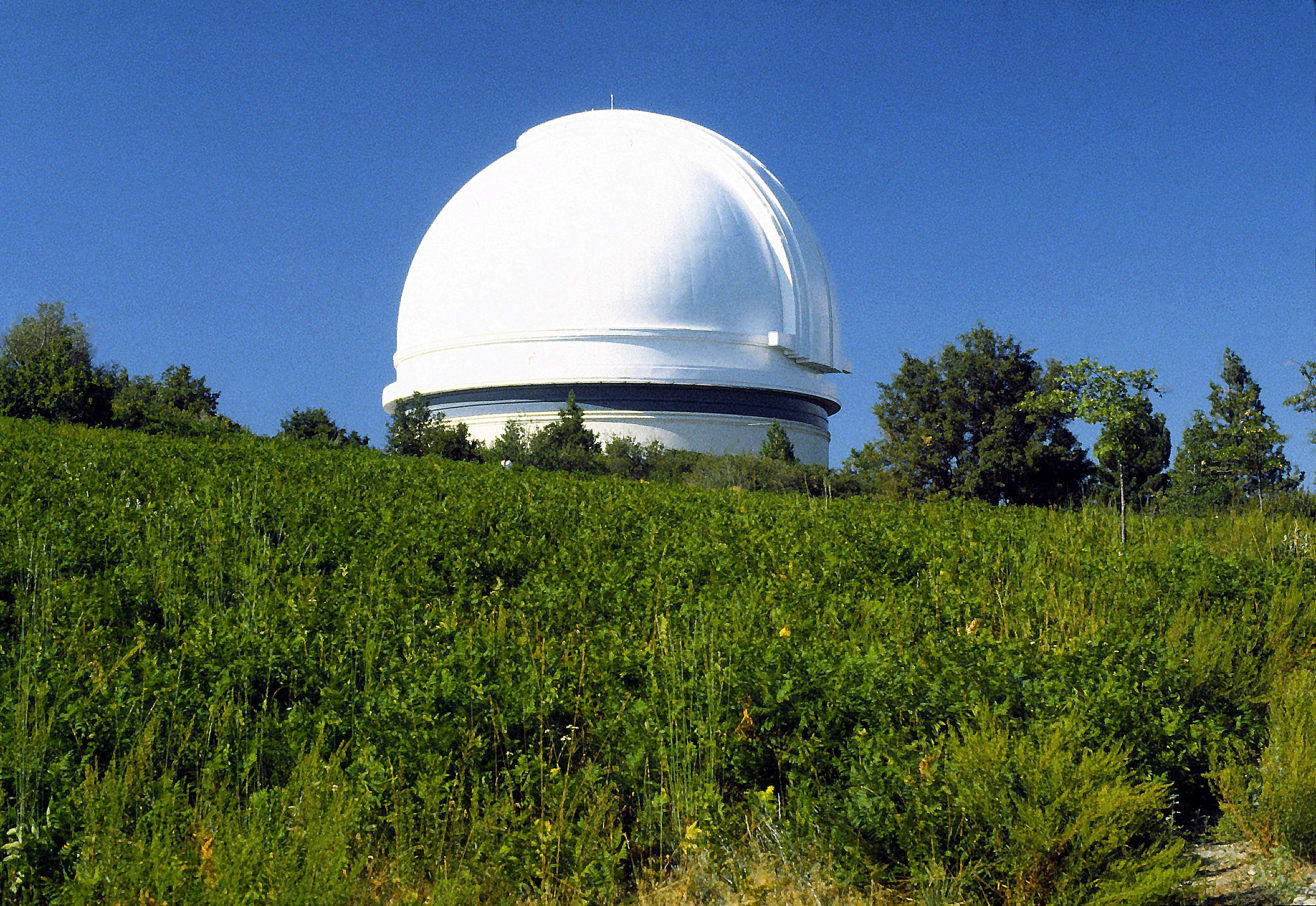
The dome of the Palomar Observatory in California, where Salacia was discovered on 22 September 2004.

Salacia was discovered on 22 September 2004 by American astronomers Henry Roe, Michael Brown, and Kristina Barkume at the Palomar Observatory in California, United States. The discovery observations were formally published in May 2005 in the Minor Planet Electronic Circular (MPEC) 2005-J26. The object was announced alongside a group of seven new trans-Neptunian objects tracked by the IAU's Minor Planet Center.

At the time of its initial detection on 22 September, Salacia was recorded with a red-filter apparent magnitude ranging between 20.1 and 20.6. Following its initial tracking, the object was assigned the provisional designation 2004 SB_{60}. While the discovery tracking occurred in 2004, astronomers successfully verified earlier positions of the body through archival precovery images taken at the Siding Spring Observatory (Station 260) dating back to 25 July 1982.

=== Further observations ===
The observation arc of Salacia begins with a precovery observation on 25 July 1982 at the Siding Spring Observatory (Station 260). Between 2001 and 2003, Salacia was pictured multiple times by the Near-Earth Asteroid Tracking (NEAT) program at Palomar (Station 644) and the Sloan Digital Sky Survey at Apache Point (Station 645). After its discovery in 2004, it was observed by the 5-meter Hale Reflector (Station 675) and the 3.5-meter telescope at Mauna Kea (Station 568). As of May 2026, a total of 490 observations have been recorded over a period of 37.16 years (13,572 days). These observations were made by ground-based and space-based telescopes, such as the Hubble Space Telescope (Station 250). More recent tracking was done by the Pan-STARRS 1 survey (Station F51), the Weizmann Astrophysical Observatory (Station M01), and the Pises Observatory (Station 122). The most recent observation recorded in the Minor Planet Center database was done on 1 November 2025, at F51 – Pan-STARRS 1, Haleakalā.

=== Nomenclature ===
==== Numbering and naming ====
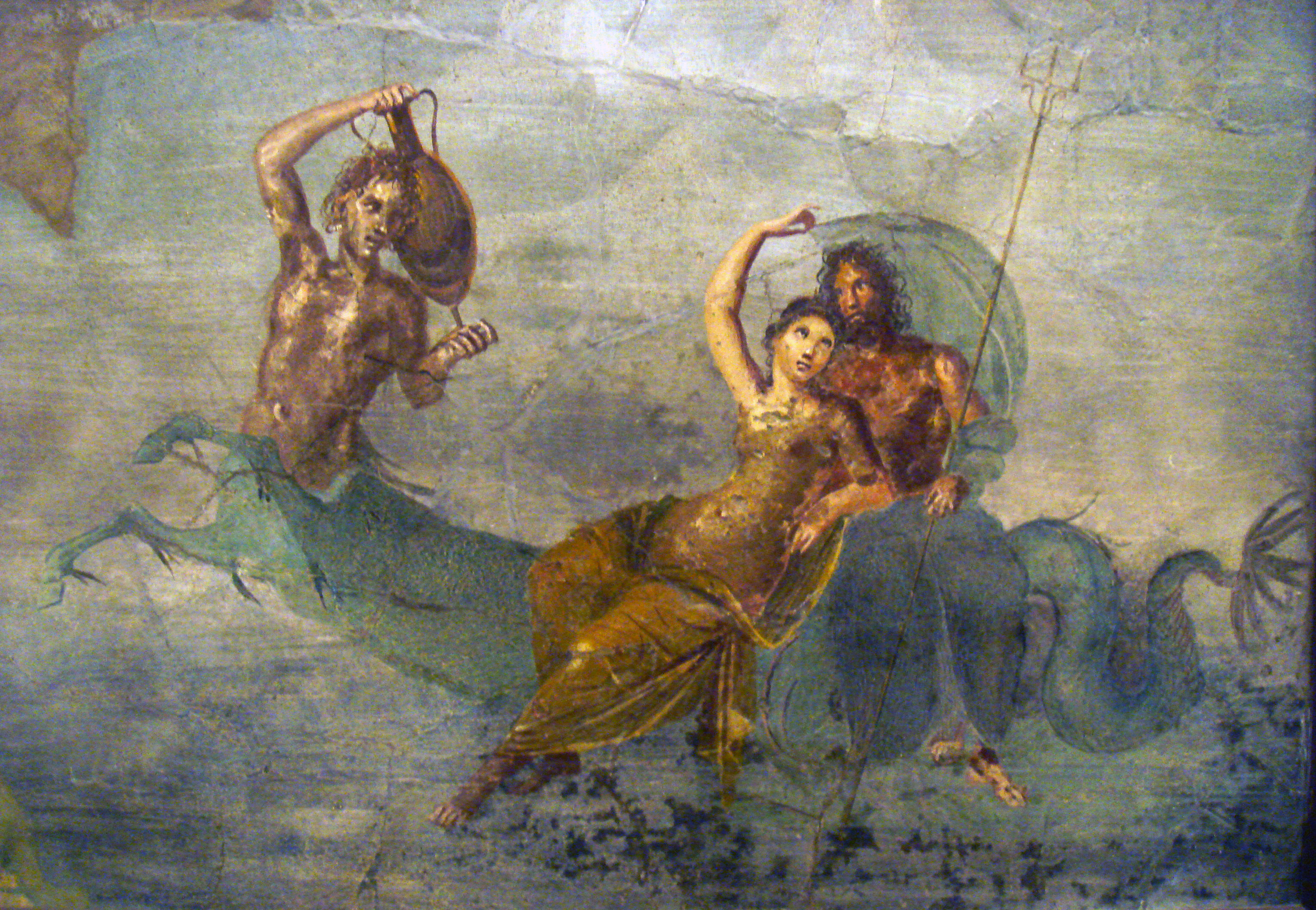
Salacia, the goddess of salt water

This minor planet was named after Salacia (/səˈleɪʃə/ sə-LAY-shə, Latin: [saˈɫaːkia]), the goddess of salt water, consort of Neptune. She is the Roman equivalent of the Greek sea goddess Amphitrite or Tethys. The object had been assigned its permanent minor planet number (120347) on 16 November 2005, following the precise consolidation of its orbital path data. The official naming citation was subsequently published on 18 February 2011 in M.P.C. 73984, which formally established the name within the International Astronomical Union's minor planet index. Its moon was named Actaea (/ækˈtiːə/; Ancient Greek: Ἀκταία, romanized: Aktaía, lit. 'the dweller on coasts'), after one of the 50 Nereid sea-nymphs in Greek mythology, which matches the system's marine naming theme.

==== Planetary symbol ====
Salacia's symbol

Planetary symbols are no longer used much in astronomy, so Salacia never received a symbol in the astronomical literature. Denis Moskowitz, a software engineer who designed most of the dwarf planet symbols, proposed a stylised hippocamp (formerly) as the symbol for Salacia; although this symbol is not widely used.

== Orbit and classification ==
Salacia orbits the Sun at a distance of 37.7–46.7 AU with a semi-major axis of 42.2 AU, finishing its orbit once every 274.0 years. Salacia is a non-resonant object with a moderate eccentricity of approximately 0.11 and a large inclination of 23.9° with respect to the ecliptic. The orbit of Salacia is similar to Pluto's, except for a near opposite longitude of ascending node. Its current position is near its most northern position above the ecliptic.

Salacia is located in the classical region of the Kuiper belt between 39 and 48 AU from the Sun. Because it lacks an active orbital resonance with Neptune, it is grouped as a typical member of the classical Kuiper belt population, commonly called "cubewanos". However, Salacia's steep orbital inclination of 23.9° places it within the dynamically "hot" sub-population of the classical belt. Unlike cold classical objects that formed in place along circular paths, hot classical bodies likely formed closer to the Sun and were scattered outward into highly tilted orbits during the early migration of Neptune.

Astronomers utilize different frameworks to sort these outer Solar System bodies, leading to a long-standing academic debate over Salacia's exact status. In the Deep Ecliptic Survey framework by Elliot et al., Salacia is grouped as a scattered–extended object because the system automatically places highly tilted orbits into the scattered categories. Conversely, Brett Gladman and his team reject this label based on a 10-million-year computer simulation testing orbital stability. Because Salacia's orbit stays perfectly stable and completely clear of Neptune's gravity during the simulation, Gladman et al. formally classify it as a hot classical Kuiper belt object. This orbital path also places it near the Haumea collisional family by coincidence; however, tracking and space-based spectral data confirm Salacia is an unrelated background object despite its water-ice rich surface.

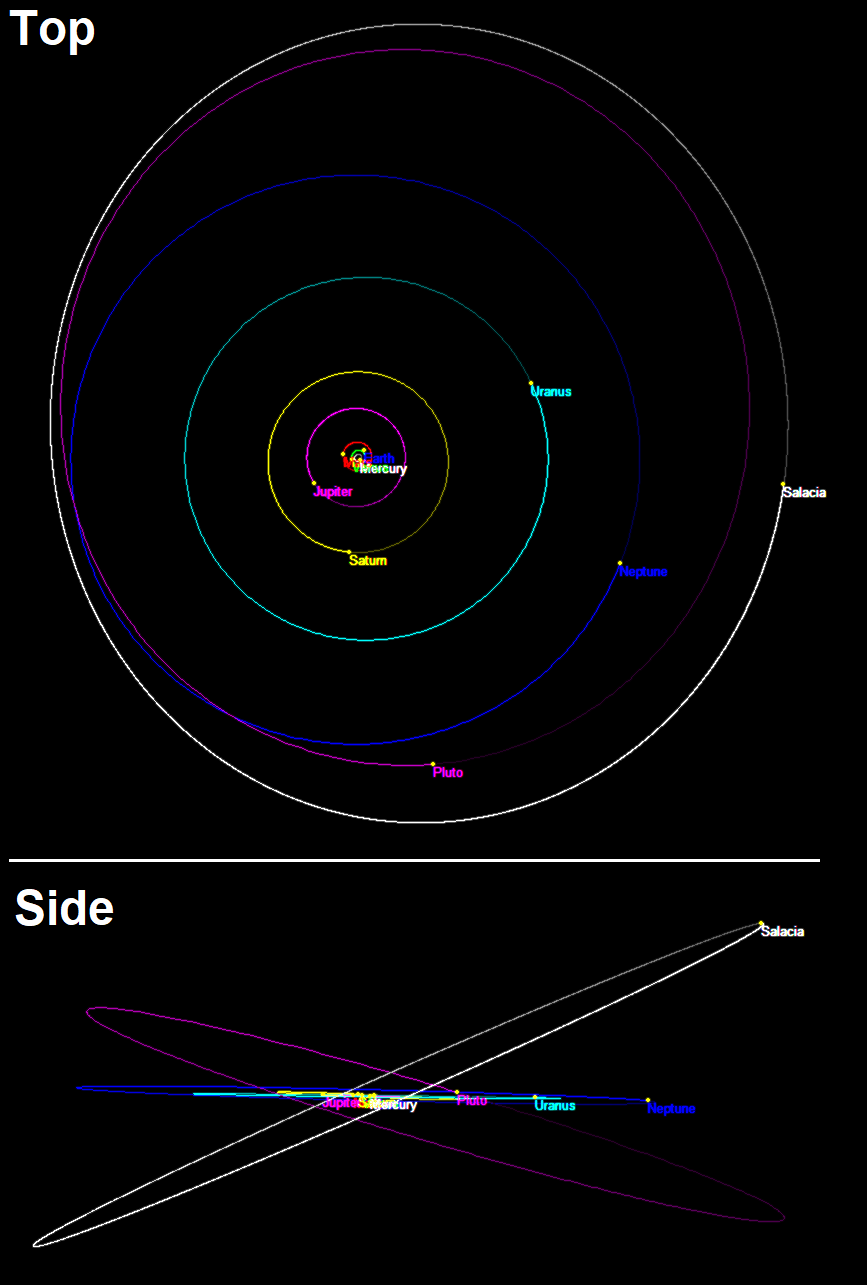
The orbit of Salacia compared to Pluto's and the eight planets' orbits in top view and the side view.

== Observability ==
=== Occultations ===
Salacia stellar occultations
Date	Star apparent magnitude (G-mag)	Occultation duration	Measured chord length	Target body	Observing asset / Network
27 Dec 2018	15.5	66.7 s (maximum duration)	Maybe	Salacia	LESIA Lucky Star
28 Jul 2023	Maybe	31.2±0.3 s	786.5±7.8 km	Salacia	La Silla 1.54m Telescope
17 Aug 2024	15.9	48.2 s (maximum duration)	Maybe	Salacia & Actaea	Hubble / LESIA
26 Jan 2027	13.9	42.5 s (predicted)	Maybe	Salacia	SwRI RECON network

Stellar occultations by Salacia happen when it passes in front of a background star, letting scientists measure its precise position, shape, and size profile. To make predictions more precise, astronomers map Salacia's orbit using wide-field star catalogs, while a 2015 study identified four potential occultations visible by the James Webb Space Telescope using faint background stars between infrared magnitudes 14 and 16. Several recorded campaigns have progressively narrowed Salacia's orbital path from an early uncertainty of about 2300 km. On 27 December 2018, an event monitored by the LESIA - Observatoire de Paris against a Gaia magnitude 15.5 star captured a 4.8 magnitude drop, significantly refining the orbit from an initial ground-based uncertainty of 4214.9 km. Following this, a 28 July 2023 occultation captured by the 1.54m Danish Telescope at La Silla recorded a light drop lasting 31.2±0.3 s at a relative speed of 25.24 km/s, providing a direct single-chord surface size measurement of 786.5±7.8 km. A rare double stellar occultation was recorded on 17 August 2024, when both Salacia and its moon, Actaea, blocked the same Gaia magnitude 15.9 star within 5 minutes of each other. Because the initial ground-based path carried a massive uncertainty of 1842.8 km, astronomers used the Hubble Space Telescope under Proposal 17848 to take precise photos beforehand, reducing the uncertainty to just 300 km. This allowed ground stations to align their telescopes perfectly, recording a sharp 5.0 magnitude drop to measure both bodies, while the RECON network is targeting a future occultation of a magnitude 13.9 star scheduled for 26 January 2027.

== Rotation and hypothesized shape ==
=== Light curves and shape ===
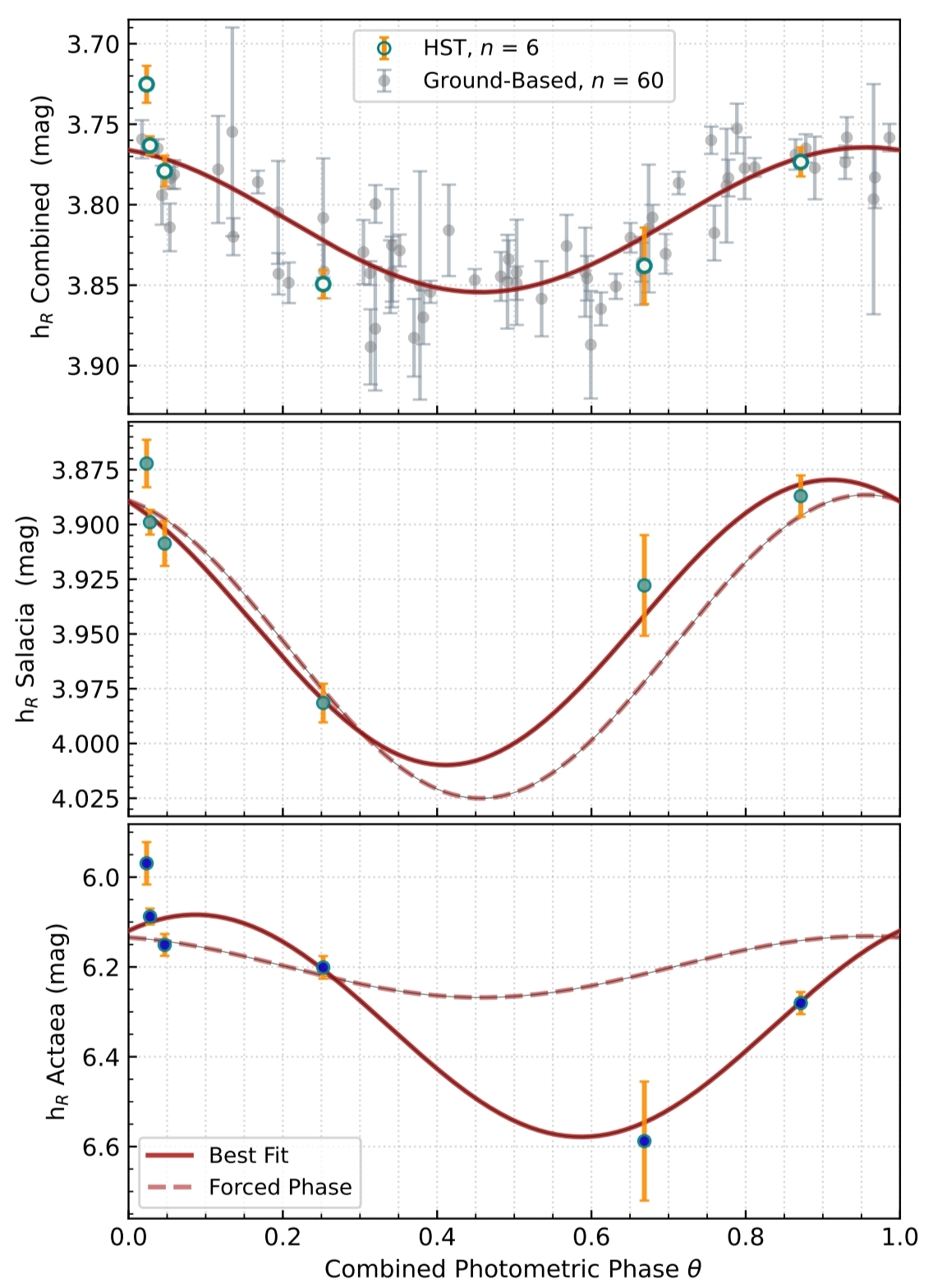
Salacia's light curve amplitude.

Salacia has a very low light curve amplitude of only about 3%, meaning its brightness does not change much as it spins. Accurate tracking measures this variation at 0.0900±0.0036 magnitudes. This small change suggests that Salacia is either nearly a perfect sphere or its pole is pointing almost directly at Earth.

In planetary science, minor light variations can be caused by either an elongated shape or by dark and light spots on a round body. An elongated shape would produce a double-peaked light curve with two minimums and maximums per rotation. Because Salacia's light variations show a single-peaked pattern with only one peak per cycle, astronomers explicitly reject the elongated triaxial ellipsoid shape idea. Instead, the light curve is entirely driven by uneven albedo variations across its surface, so Salacia is unlikely to be an elongated triaxial ellipsoid, but rather having a nearly spherical shape with small albedo variations across its surface.

=== Rotational speed and mutual tidal locking ===
In 2014, early studies estimated that Salacia rotated very fast, once every 6.09–6.5 hours. However, a long-term study published in 2025 showed this was a mathematical error called "observational aliasing." Because ground telescopes could only watch Salacia for a few days at a time, the gaps in the data made a slow 5.49-day spin look like a fast 6.5-hour cycle.

The 2025 study analyzed 165 hours of data collected over 16 years. By combining ground tracking with images from the Hubble Space Telescope, scientists found that Salacia's 5.49-day rotation exactly matches the time its moon, Actaea, takes to complete one orbit (5.49389±0.00001 d).

The Pluto–Charon system — an example of mutual tidal locking, similar to the Salacia–Actaea system.

This means the two bodies are mutually tidally locked in a "doubly synchronous rotation," always showing the exact same face to each other just like Pluto and Charon. Before this happened, Salacia likely spun much faster, at around 10 hours per rotation. Because Actaea is relatively large, its gravitational pull created internal friction that gradually slowed Salacia down. Computer models show this tidal slowing took only 150 million to 400 million years to finish, meaning the pair has been locked in this balance for billions of years.

Separating the individual light data also revealed features about the moon itself. While Salacia shows small brightness changes, Actaea exhibits a very high light curve amplitude of at least 0.95 magnitudes. This indicates that Actaea either has a highly stretched shape or extreme surface contrasts with large dark and light patches. This discovery cements the system as only the third confirmed doubly synchronous binary in the trans-Neptunian region, joining Pluto–Charon and Eris–Dysnomia.

== Physical characteristics ==
Comparison of sizes, albedos, and colors of various large trans-Neptunian objects with diameters greater than 700 km (430 mi). Salacia is shown on the middle row, third from the right. The light and dark colored arcs represent uncertainties of the object's size.

=== Size, mass and density ===
History of diameter estimates for Salacia
Year of Publication	Diameter (km)	Method	References
2012	905±103	thermal (Spitzer)	
2013	874±32	thermal (Herschel)	
2013	854±45	thermal (Spitzer)	
2017	866±37	dynamical (HST)	
2019	846±21	thermal (combined)	(Note: approximation if Salacia and Actaea were both spherical and had the same albedo)
2025	838±44	thermal (ALMA/NEATM)	

In 2025, the total mass of the Salacia–Actaea system was estimated to be at 4.861+0.076
−0.074×10^{20} kg, with an average system density of 1.50±0.12 g/cm^{3} which was estimated in 2019; Salacia itself was estimated to be around 838 km in diameter, which is slightly smaller than Orcus (910+50
−40 km). Salacia has the lowest albedo of any known large trans-Neptunian object, having an albedo of only 0.041±0.004. According to the old estimate from 2017 based on an improved thermophysical modelling, the size of Salacia is slightly larger at around 866 km and its density therefore is slightly lower, being calculated at only 1.26 g/cm^{3} with the old mass estimate of around (4.38±0.16)×10^{20} kg.

At 838±44 km, Salacia belongs to the proposed class of "mid-sized" TNOs between 400 and 1,000 km (250 and 620 mi) in diameter. It represents the evolutionary transition between small, low-density TNOs and large, high-density dwarf planets. William Grundy and his team originally hypothesized that these mid-sized objects maintain highly porous and unheated interiors because structurally similar bodies like 55637 Uni and 229762 Gǃkúnǁʼhòmdímà exhibit low densities near 1 g/cm³. Under this framework, Grundy et al. proposed that low-albedo, mid-sized bodies did not undergo internal melting or differentiation like Orcus, Quaoar, and Charon.

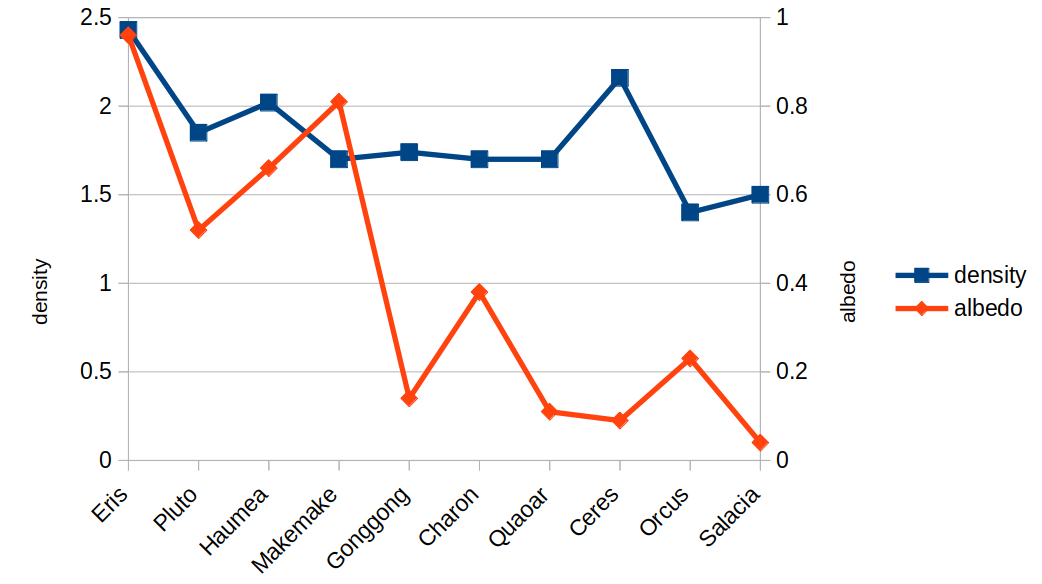
Salacia's density and albedo compared to the other most likely dwarf planets

Grundy et al. initially rejected Salacia as a dwarf planet due to its older, lower density estimates, describing Salacia as a "dwarf planet–sized TNO." However, just a few months later after they published the low density theory, they backed off that position when newer studies found that Salacia's density is relatively high, around 1.50±0.12 g/cm^{3}, while kiss et al in 2025 yielded a density of 1.45 g/cm^{3} assuming equal densities for Salacia and Actaea. If these estimates are accurate, then Salacia would have a higher density than Orcus (1.4±0.2 g/cm^{3}). Nonetheless, its extremely low albedo of 4.1% remains consistent with an ancient surface that lacks the widespread geological activity typical of larger dwarf planets.

American astronomer Michael E. Brown considers Salacia nearly certain to be a dwarf planet, placing it at the lower edge of his "nearly certain" ranking tier.

=== Surface and spectrum ===
Salacia has a dark gray surface with an extremely low albedo of 0.041±0.004 that was measured by Kiss et al. in 2025, and a B-V color index of approximately 0.66±0.06, which is considered a neutral color. Salacia's infrared spectrum is complex. Earlier studies have detected an abundance of water ice of less than 5% on the surface. However, astronomers got a much clearer look at the surface on 31 August 2023 using the Near-Infrared Spectrograph (NIRSpec) on the James Webb Space Telescope. Observed under Guaranteed Time Observations program 1191, Salacia was at a heliocentric distance of 45.1 au and a phase angle of 0.94°.

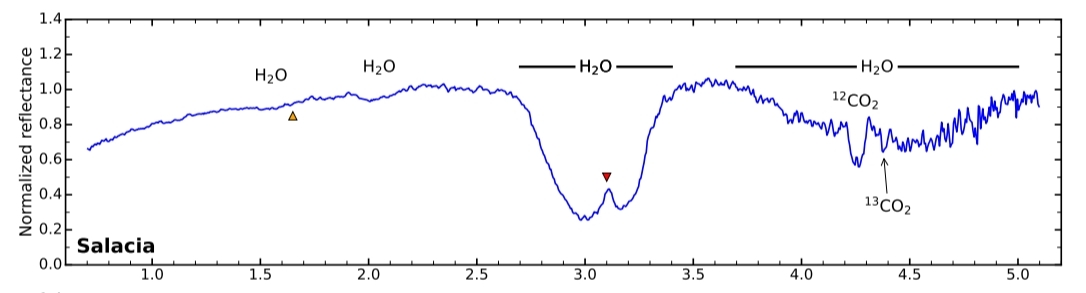
The near-infrared spectrum of Salacia as measured by the James Webb Space Telescope. The spectrum of Salacia suggests crystalline water ice on its surface.

The JWST spectrum showed distinct water-ice absorption bands at 1.5, 2, 3, and between 4–5 μm, with a very sharp drop right at 3 μm. The specific diagnostic band for crystalline water ice at 1.65 μm is weak and difficult to verify. This indicates that Salacia's surface has a complex mix of both crystalline and amorphous water ice. The shape of the absorption features between 4.5–5.0 μm depends heavily on how these two ice phases are mixed and the size of their ice grains. Because water ice has a very high extinction coefficient at 3 μm, the absorption band at that wavelength is nearly 100% optically saturated. Minor variations in this saturated band suggest the ice sits in complex vertical layers or uneven mixtures in the upper crust. It also detected carbon dioxide ice through its strong ν_{3} fundamental vibrational band at 4.25 μm. The spectrum displays a distinct V-shaped CO_{2} absorption feature that bottoms out at 4.27 μm. This specific V-shape shows that the carbon dioxide ice is not a pure crystalline layer, but is likely trapped as an amorphous mixture inside the surrounding water ice. Data from the 2.6–2.8 μm range showed no signatures of hydrogen peroxide (H_{2}O_{2}), which space radiation usually creates on pure water ice. Astronomers also searched for a weaker absorption band at 4.37 μm from the heavier isotope ^{13}CO_{2}, but the data was too noisy to confirm it.

Salacia completely lacks volatile super-ices like methane (CH_{4}) or carbon monoxide (CO). Its surface escape velocity is only 385–542 m/s, which is too weak to keep solar-heated volatile gases from escaping into space at local temperatures of 30–50 K. This low gravity explains why Salacia also lacks aliphatic hydrocarbons and complex organic signatures between 3.3–3.6 μm. However, because Salacia is larger than the critical geophysical threshold of roughly 500 km, it had enough early radiogenic heating to melt and move its internal water and carbon dioxide ices up to the surface. This internal evolution explains why Salacia keeps an ice-rich surface despite its low albedo and lack of ongoing cryovolcanism. Because of these strong water and carbon dioxide ice signatures and lack of complex organics, Salacia is classified as a "prominent water" (H_{2}O-type) TNO under recent taxonomic frameworks. Other mid to large trans-Neptunian objects such as 307261 Máni, 90482 Orcus and 208996 Achlys also have Salacia's neutral spectrum and has a water ice-rich surface or composition. These objects are all classified as "prominent water" (H_{2}O)-type TNOs according to Wong.

== Binary system ==
=== Moon ===
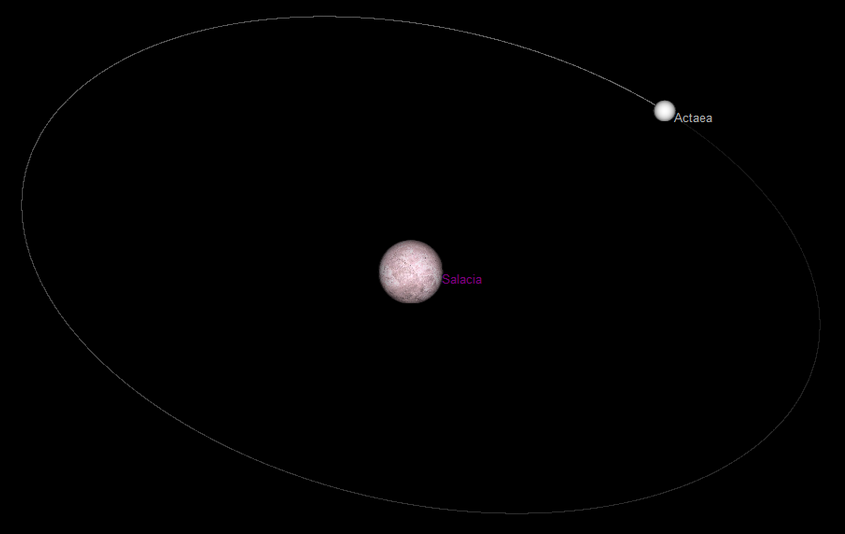
A simulated nearly circular orbit of Actaea at a distance of 5700+30 −29 km away from Salacia.

Salacia has one known moon, Actaea. It orbits Salacia every 5.49389±0.00016 d at a distance of 5700+30
−29 km with an eccentricity of 0.008±0.003. It was discovered on 21 July 2006 by Keith Noll, Harold Levison, Denise Stephens and William Grundy with the Hubble Space Telescope.

Actaea has a diameter of 393±33 km, making it the fifth-largest known moon of a trans-Neptunian object, after Charon (1212±1 km), Dysnomia (615+60
−50 km), Vanth (442.5±10.2 km), and Ilmarë (403±40 km). Assuming that Actaea has a density of 0.7 g/cm^{3}, which is thought to be typical that of trans-Neptunian objects' moons, The mass ratio between Actaea and Salacia will be approximately 0.044:1. (Note: This means Actaea is approximately 4.4% the mass of Salacia.) It has an extremely low albedo of 0.021±0.004, which is only half the albedo of Salacia (0.041±0.004).

=== Tidal evolution ===
The Salacia system has undergone enough tidal evolution to circularize its orbit, which matches the low measured eccentricity. The ratio of Actaea's semi-major axis to its primary's Hill radius is 0.0023, making it the tightest out of every known trans-Neptunian binary with a calculated orbit.

Tidal forces transferred angular momentum from Salacia's rotation directly into Actaea's orbit, forcing the moon to push farther away until the distance between the two bodies expanded to its modern value of about 13.2 Salacia radii. Tidal models show that if Salacia remained an unheated, mixed-up blend of primitive rock and ice, this evolution would have dragged out for nearly 1 billion years. However, the system could have synchronized much faster, in about 100 million years, if its interior separated early in its history through an ancient, brief epoch of internal melting. This allowed the system to reach its stable, quiet state early in the history of the Solar System, whereas larger, more massive bodies like Eris required nearly 4 billion years to complete their tidal cycles.

== Proposed explorations ==
Salacia has not been visited by a space probe, though many studies have found it to be a feasible target for future missions. Planetary scientists advocate for the exploration of large trans-Neptunian objects to provide insights into the formation and evolution of the Solar System.

Several studies have analyzed flyby trajectories to Salacia using planetary gravity assists to reduce flight time. A 2019 study by Amanda Zangari and her team showed that a spacecraft launched between 2025 and 2027 could use a single Saturn gravity assist to reach Salacia in 15.4 to 24.2 years, depending on the launch vehicle's power. For later windows, Samuel Walters and James Lyne identified a 2031 trajectory that utilizes an unpowered Jupiter gravity assist, allowing a probe to complete its outer Solar System transit in exactly 25 years and arrive at Salacia in February 2056.

Advanced flight frameworks using an Earth and Jupiter gravity assist combination (ΔVEGA-JGA) have also been evaluated. A 2021 trajectory survey by James Evans Lyne and colleagues identified a launch window on 15 January 2029 with an 18.4-year transit time, and a second option on 27 February 2042 with an 18.2-year duration. Multi-target missions involving other outer planets have also been proposed. Bryan J. Holler and his team found a 2040 mission design that performs a close flyby of Neptune before reaching Salacia in December 2046.

A separate dual-probe mission analyzed by Anderson et al. proposed launching an 800 kg Salacia flyby probe alongside a Neptune flagship mission on 28 February 2042. Under this optimized flight plan, the Salacia probe would use a Jupiter gravity assist to complete its transit in 17.6 years, executing its close flyby encounter in October 2059. Additionally, the feasibility of an orbital capture rendezvous has been studied, with a 2013 university assessment showing options for putting a 100 to 380 kg orbiter into a permanent orbit around Salacia using a Jupiter swingby.

== See also ==
- 307261 Máni, a dwarf planet candidate in the Kuiper belt that is similar to Salacia in size and composition with large topographic features
- 174567 Varda and its moon Ilmarë, a system with similar characteristics
- 208996 Achlys – another large, gray-colored Kuiper belt object with abundant water ice and an elongated shape like Haumea
- List of trans-Neptunian objects
- List of solar system objects by size
- List of possible dwarf planets
- Double planet
- List of minor planets: 120001–121000
- Minor-planet moon
