= Controversy over the discovery of Haumea =

Controversy over discovery of a dwarf planet

Haumea, discovered in 2004, was the first of the IAU-recognized dwarf planets to be discovered since Pluto in 1930. Its naming as a dwarf planet was delayed by several years due to controversy over who should receive credit for its discovery. A California Institute of Technology (Caltech) team headed by Michael E. Brown first noticed the object, but a Spanish team headed by José Luis Ortiz Moreno were the first to announce it, and so normally would receive credit. Brown accused the Spanish team of fraud, using Caltech observations without credit to make their discovery, while the Ortiz team accused the American team of political interference with the International Astronomical Union (IAU). The IAU officially recognized the Californian team's proposed name Haumea over the name proposed by the Spanish team, Ataecina, in September 2008.

== Discovery and announcement ==
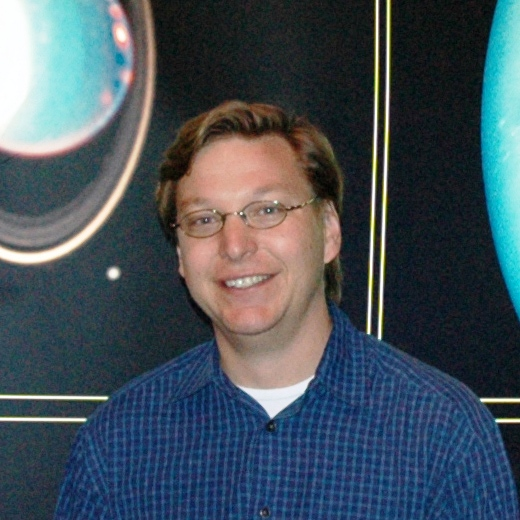
Michael E. Brown

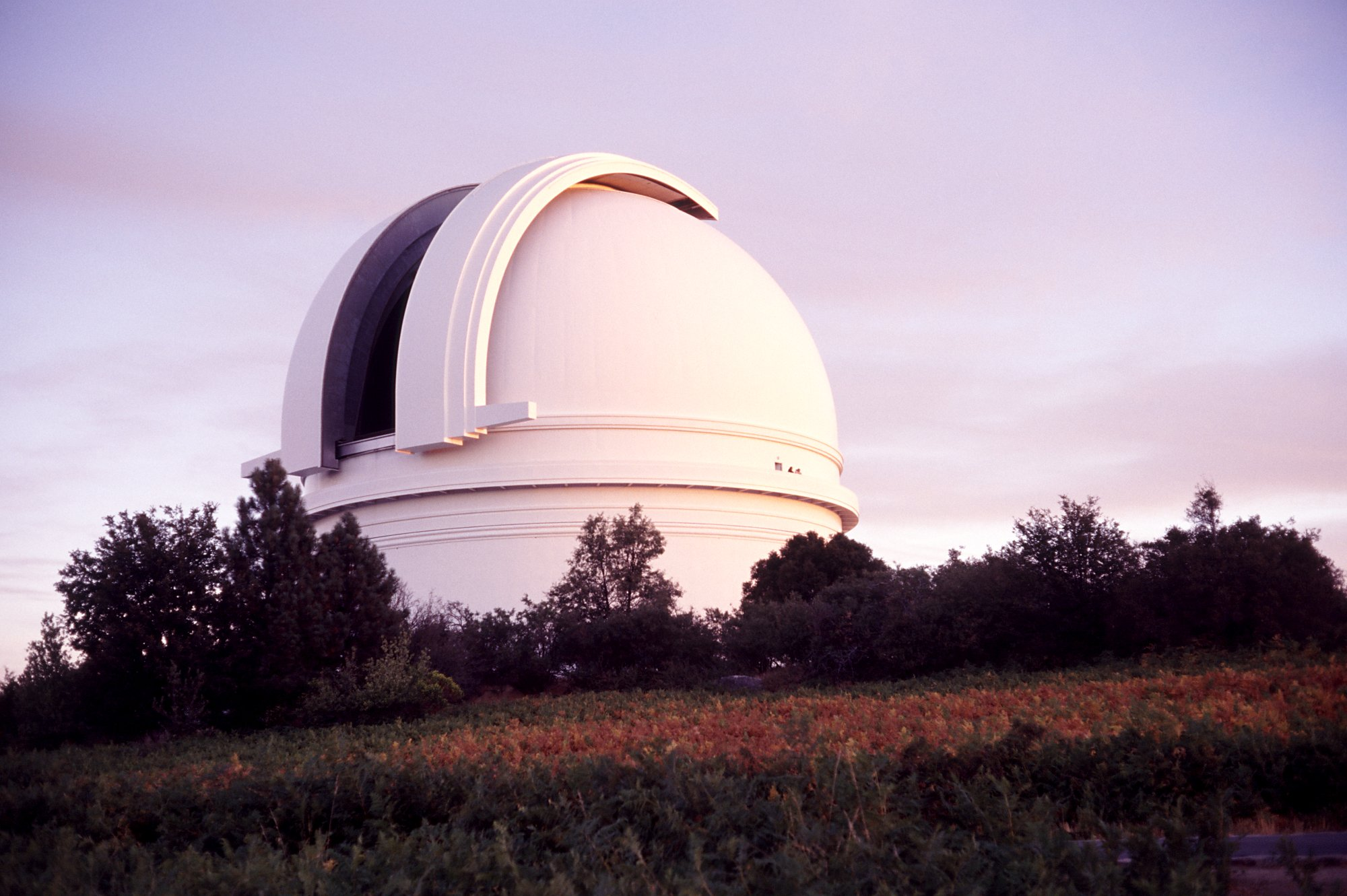
Precovery images of Haumea were recorded as early as 1955 at the Palomar Observatory

On December 28, 2004, Mike Brown and his team discovered Haumea on images they had taken with the 1.3 m SMARTS Telescope from the Cerro Tololo Inter-American Observatory in Chile at the Palomar Observatory in the United States on May 6, 2004, while looking for what he hoped would be the tenth planet. The Caltech discovery team used the nickname "Santa" among themselves, because they had discovered Haumea on December 28, 2004, just after Christmas. However, it was clearly too small to be a planet, because it was significantly smaller than Pluto, and Brown did not announce the discovery. Instead he kept it under wraps, along with several other large trans-Neptunian objects (TNOs), pending additional observation to better determine their natures. When his team discovered Haumea's moons, they realized that Haumea was more rocky than other TNOs, and that its moons were mostly ice. They then discovered a small family of nearby icy TNOs, and concluded that these were remnants of Haumea's icy mantle, which had been blasted off by a collision. On July 7, 2005, while he was finishing the paper describing the discovery, Brown's daughter Lilah was born, which delayed the announcement further. On July 20, the Caltech team published an online abstract of a report intended to announce the discovery at a conference the following September. In this Haumea was given the code K40506A.

At around that time, Pablo Santos Sanz, a student of José Luis Ortiz Moreno at the Instituto de Astrofísica de Andalucía at Sierra Nevada Observatory in southern Spain, claims to have examined the backlog of photos that the Ortiz team had started taking in December 2002. He says that he found Haumea in late July 2005, on images taken on March 7, 9, and 10, 2003. He further said that in checking whether this was a known object, the team came across Brown's internet summary, describing a bright TNO much like the one they had just found. Googling the reference number for object K40506A on the morning of July 26, they found the Caltech observation logs of Haumea, but according to their account, those logs contained too little information for Ortiz to tell if they were the same object. The Ortiz team also checked with the Minor Planet Center (MPC), which had no record of this object. Wanting to establish priority, they emailed the MPC with their discovery on the night of July 27, 2005, titled "Big TNO discovery, urgent", without making any mention of the Caltech logs. The next morning they again accessed the Caltech logs, including observations from several additional nights. They then asked Reiner Stoss at the amateur Astronomical Observatory of Mallorca for further observations. Stoss found precovery images of Haumea in digitized Palomar Observatory slides from 1955, and located Haumea with his own telescope that night, July 28. Within an hour, the Ortiz team submitted a second report to the MPC that included this new data. Again, no mention was made of having accessed the Caltech logs. The data was published by the MPC on July 29.

In a press release on the same day, the Ortiz team called Haumea the "tenth planet". On July 29, 2005, Haumea was given its first official label, the temporary designation 2003 EL_{61}, with the "2003" based on the date of the Spanish discovery image. On September 7, 2006, it was numbered and admitted into the official minor planet catalogue as (136108) 2003 EL_{61}.

== Reaction to the announcement ==
The same day as the MPC publication, Brown's group announced the discovery of another Kuiper belt object, Eris, more distant, brighter and apparently larger than Pluto, as the tenth planet. The announcement was made earlier than planned to forestall the possibility of similar events with that discovery, when the MPC told them that their observational data was publicly accessible, and they realized that not only Haumea data but by that time their Eris data had been publicly accessed. The same day Ortiz announced the discovery of Haumea, Brown submitted his own draft with the data on the first of its moons that he had discovered on January 26, 2005, to The Astrophysical Journal.

Brown, though disappointed at being scooped, congratulated the Ortiz team on their discovery. He apologized for immediately overshadowing their announcement of Haumea with his announcement of Eris, and explained that someone had accessed their data and he was afraid of being scooped again. Ortiz did not volunteer to say that it had been he who accessed the data. Upon learning from web server records that it was a computer at the Sierra Nevada Observatory that had accessed his observation logs the day before the discovery announcement – logs which included enough information to allow the Ortiz team to precover Haumea in their 2003 images – Brown came to suspect fraud. He emailed Ortiz on August 9 and asked for an explanation. Ortiz responded saying that Brown's penchant for "hiding objects" had alienated other astronomers and harmed science (see Timeline of discovery of Solar System planets and their moons to verify typical time scale of observation and publication of discoveries).

On August 15 the Caltech team filed a formal complaint with the IAU, accusing the Ortiz team of a serious breach of scientific ethics in failing to acknowledge their use of the Caltech data, and asked the MPC to strip them of discovery status. Ortiz later admitted he had accessed the Caltech observation logs but denied any wrongdoing, stating this was merely part of verifying whether they had discovered a new object. Brown began to wonder if the Spanish team had actually identified Haumea at all before they saw his own abstract and telescope log, noting that Ortiz' team claimed to have sat on their data for a period of 28 months until Brown's upload of his abstract, then coincidentally identified Haumea within the six days prior to accessing his abstract.

== Official naming ==
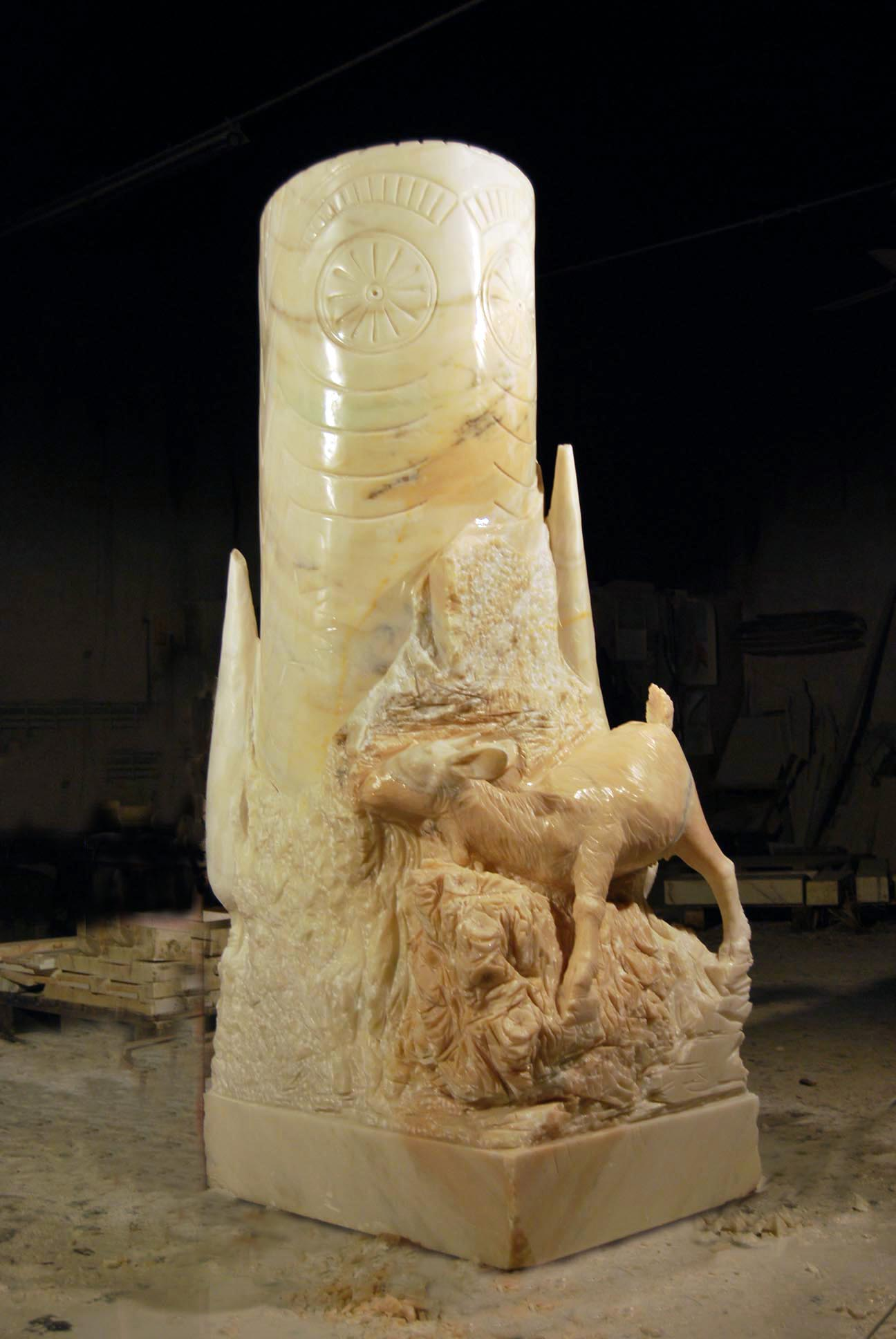
A representation of the Iberian goddess Ataecina, which had been proposed as a name for the dwarf planet

IAU protocol is that discovery credit for a minor planet goes to whoever first submits a report to the MPC with enough positional data for a decent orbit determination, and that the credited discoverer has priority in naming it. This was Ortiz et al., and they proposed the name Ataecina, an Iberian goddess of the underworld. She is the equivalent of the Roman goddess Proserpina, who was in turn one of Pluto's lovers. However, as a chthonic deity, Ataecina would only have been an appropriate name for an object in a stable orbital resonance with Neptune (see astronomical naming conventions), and Haumea's resonance (if known of by the Spanish team) was unstable.

Following guidelines established by the IAU that classical Kuiper belt objects be given names of mythological beings associated with creation, in September 2006 the Caltech team submitted formal names from Hawaiian mythology to the IAU for both (136108) 2003 EL_{61} and its moons, in order "to pay homage to the place where the satellites were discovered". The names were proposed by David Rabinowitz of the Caltech team. Haumea is the tutelary goddess of the island of Hawaiʻi, where the Mauna Kea Observatory is located. In addition, she is identified with Papa, the goddess of the earth and wife of Wākea (space), which is appropriate because 2003 EL_{61} is thought to be composed almost entirely of solid rock, without the thick ice mantle over a small rocky core typical of other known Kuiper belt objects. Lastly, Haumea is the goddess of fertility and childbirth, with many children who sprang from different parts of her body; this corresponds to the swarm of icy bodies thought to have broken off the dwarf planet during an ancient collision. The two known moons, also believed to have been born in this manner, were thus named after two of Haumea's daughters, Hiʻiaka and Nāmaka.

The dispute over who had discovered the object delayed the acceptance of either name. On 17 September 2008, the IAU announced that the two bodies in charge of naming dwarf planets, the Committee on Small Body Nomenclature (CSBN) and the Working Group for Planetary System Nomenclature (WGPSN), had decided on the Caltech proposal of Haumea. At the CSBN, the outcome of the voting was very close, eventually being decided by a single vote. However, the date of the discovery was listed on the announcement as March 7, 2003, the location of discovery as the Sierra Nevada Observatory, and the name of the discoverer was left blank.

== Aftermath ==
Brian G. Marsden, head of the MPC at Harvard who had supported Brown on previous naming disputes, again supported Brown, saying that "Sooner or later, posterity will realise what happened, and Mike Brown will get the full credit". He went on to state, in reference to the name of the discoverer, which was left blank in the IAU listing, that "It's deliberately vague about the discoverer of the object [...] We don't want to cause an international incident." He called the whole controversy the worst since the early 17th-century dispute over who found the four biggest satellites of Jupiter between Galileo Galilei and Simon Marius, ultimately won by Galileo.

The Ortiz team objected, suggesting that if Ataecina were not accepted the IAU could at least have chosen a third name favoring neither party, and accusing the IAU of political bias. Rumors appeared that Dagda, the name of a god from Irish mythology and a "neutral" name, was indeed proposed by a member of the CSBM but was not used in the end. Ortiz went on to say "I am not happy, I think the [IAU] decision is unfortunate and sets a bad precedent." The Spanish newspaper ABC went on to call the decision a "US conquest", asserting that politics played a major role as the US had 10 times more astronomers in the IAU than Spain had.

Immediately after the announcement of the name, Brown noted that it is unusual to be allowed to name an object without being acknowledged as its official discoverer but declared that he is pleased with the outcome and that he "think[s] this is as good a resolution as we'll get". He did get full recognition for the discovery of the two moons, Hiʻiaka and Namaka. On the fifth anniversary of the discovery he wrote a blog post with his thoughts on the importance of the discovery, but did not mention any events regarding the controversy.
