= Salacia =

Roman goddess of salt water

- Goddess of salt water
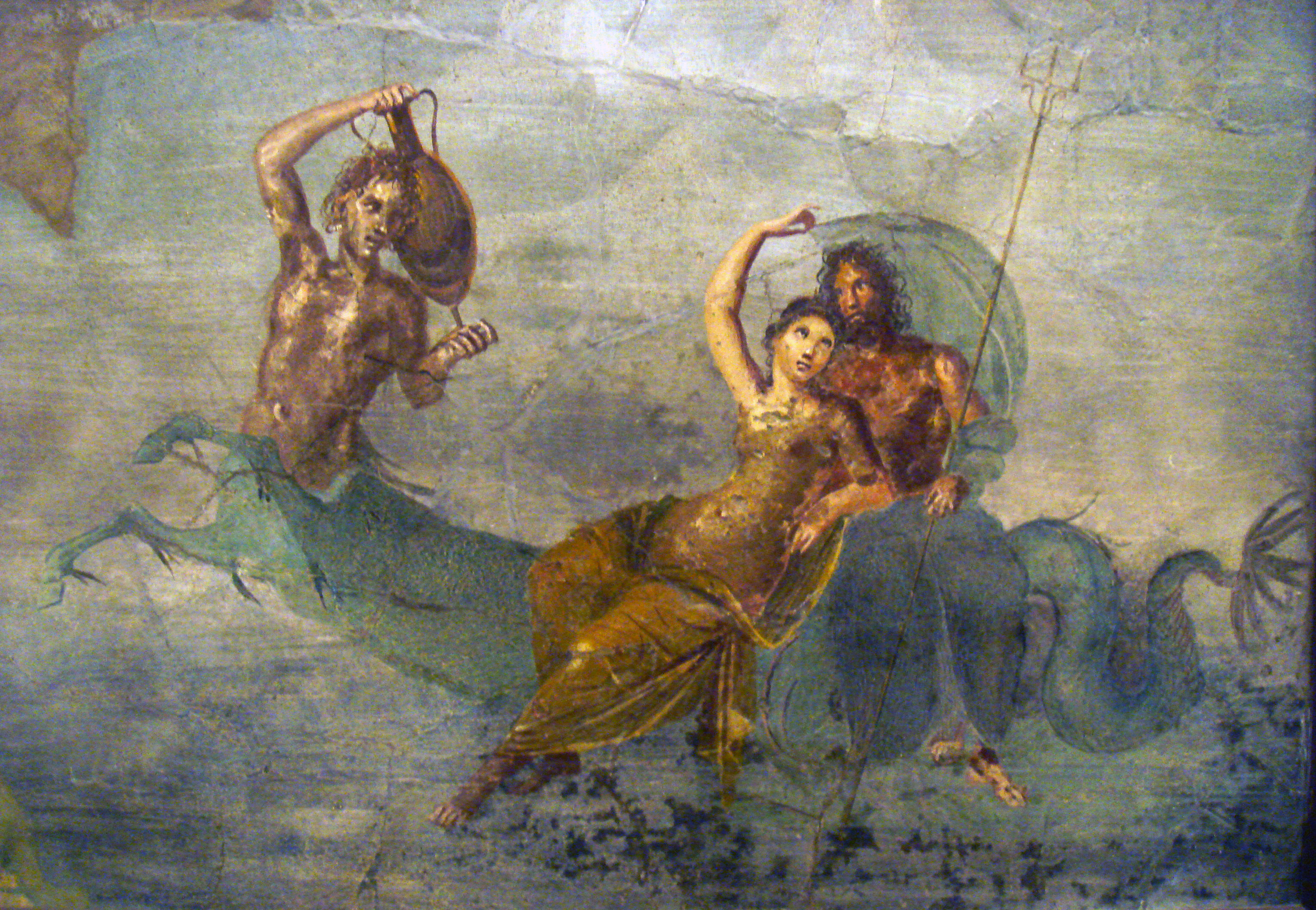
- Centaur, Salacia and Neptune, fresco from Pompeii, AD 50–79
- Abode: The Sea
- Symbol: Dolphin, Seaweed
- Mount: Dolphin

Genealogy
- Consort: Neptune
- Children: Triton

Equivalents
- Greek: Amphitrite

In ancient Roman mythology, Salacia (/səˈleɪʃə/ sə-LAY-shə, Latin: [saˈɫaːkia]) was the goddess of saltwater and the consort of the Roman ocean god Neptune. She was identified with the Greek goddesses Amphitrite, consort of Poseidon, and Tethys, consort of Oceanus.

The trans-Neptunian object 120347 Salacia is named after the goddess.

== Etymology ==
Salacia was the personification of the calm and sunlit aspect of the sea. Derived from Latin sāl, meaning "salt", the name Salācia denotes the wide, open sea, and is sometimes literally translated as "the salty one".

== Mythology ==
That Salacia was the consort of Neptune is implied by Varro, and is positively affirmed by Seneca, Augustine and Servius.

The god Neptune wanted to marry Salacia, but she was in great awe of her distinguished suitor, and to preserve her virginity, with grace and celerity she managed to glide out of his sight, and hid from him in the Atlantic Ocean. The grieving Neptune sent a dolphin to look for her and persuade the fair nymph to return and share his throne. Salacia agreed to marry Neptune and the King of the Deep was so overjoyed at these good tidings that the dolphin was awarded a place in the heavens, where he now forms a well known constellation Delphinus.

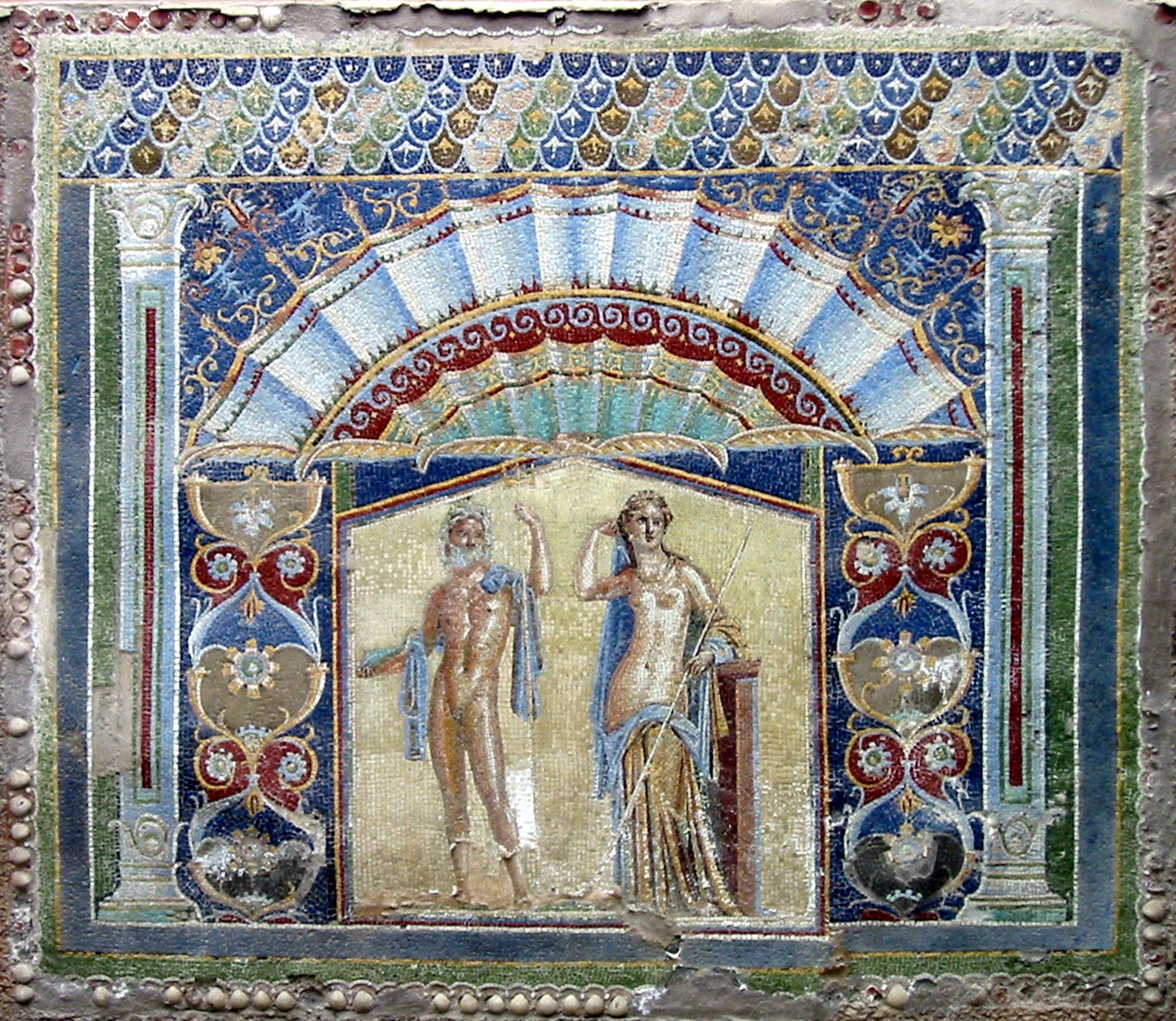
Neptune and Salacia in a mosaic, Herculaneum, 1st c. AD

As his wife, Salacia bore Neptune three children, the most celebrated being Triton, whose body was half man and half fish.

Aulus Gellius, in 13.23 of his Attic Nights, notes that Roman priests would invoke specific attributes of various gods, “maia Volcani, Salacia Neptuni, hora Quirini, nerio Martis.” Forsythe notes that Salacia Neptuni means “effervescence of Neptune”.

Sometimes, as Salachia, she is also known as the goddess of springs, ruling over the springs of highly mineralized waters.

She and Venilia are also called the paredrae of Neptune.

== Imagery ==
Salacia is represented as a beautiful nymph, crowned with seaweed, either enthroned beside Neptune or driving with him in a pearl shell chariot drawn by dolphins, sea-horses (hippocamps) or other fabulous creatures of the deep, and attended by Tritons and Nereids. She is dressed in queenly robes and has nets in her hair.
