= Sierra Nevada Observatory =

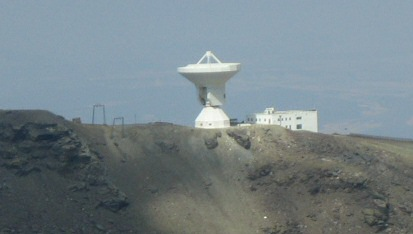
- Observatory code: J86
- Location: Sierra Nevada, Province of Granada, Granada, Spain
- Coordinates: 37°03′51″N 3°23′05″W
- Altitude: 2,896 m (9,501 ft)
- Established: 1981
- Website: www.osn.iaa.es
- Telescopes: IRAM 30m telescope
- Related media on Commons

The Sierra Nevada Observatory (Spanish: Observatorio de Sierra Nevada; OSN; code: J86) is located at Loma de Dilar (2896 m altitude) in the Sierra Nevada mountain range, in the province of Granada, Spain; established in 1981. It is operated and maintained by the Instituto de Astrofísica de Andalucía (Institute of Astrophysics of Andalusia - IAA) and contains two Nasmyth telescopes with apertures of 1.5 and 0.9 metres.

== Gallery ==
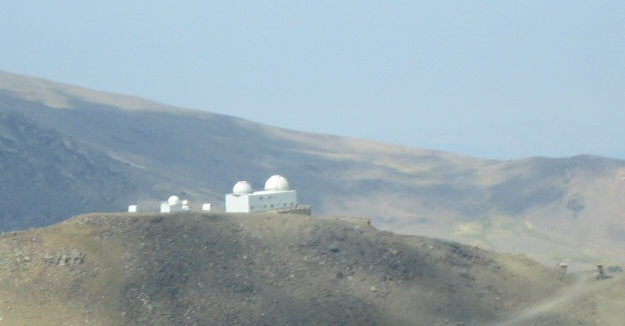
The IAA modern optical telescopes

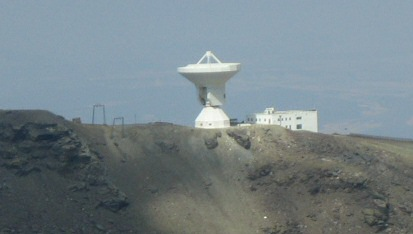
A radio telescope maintained by IRAM

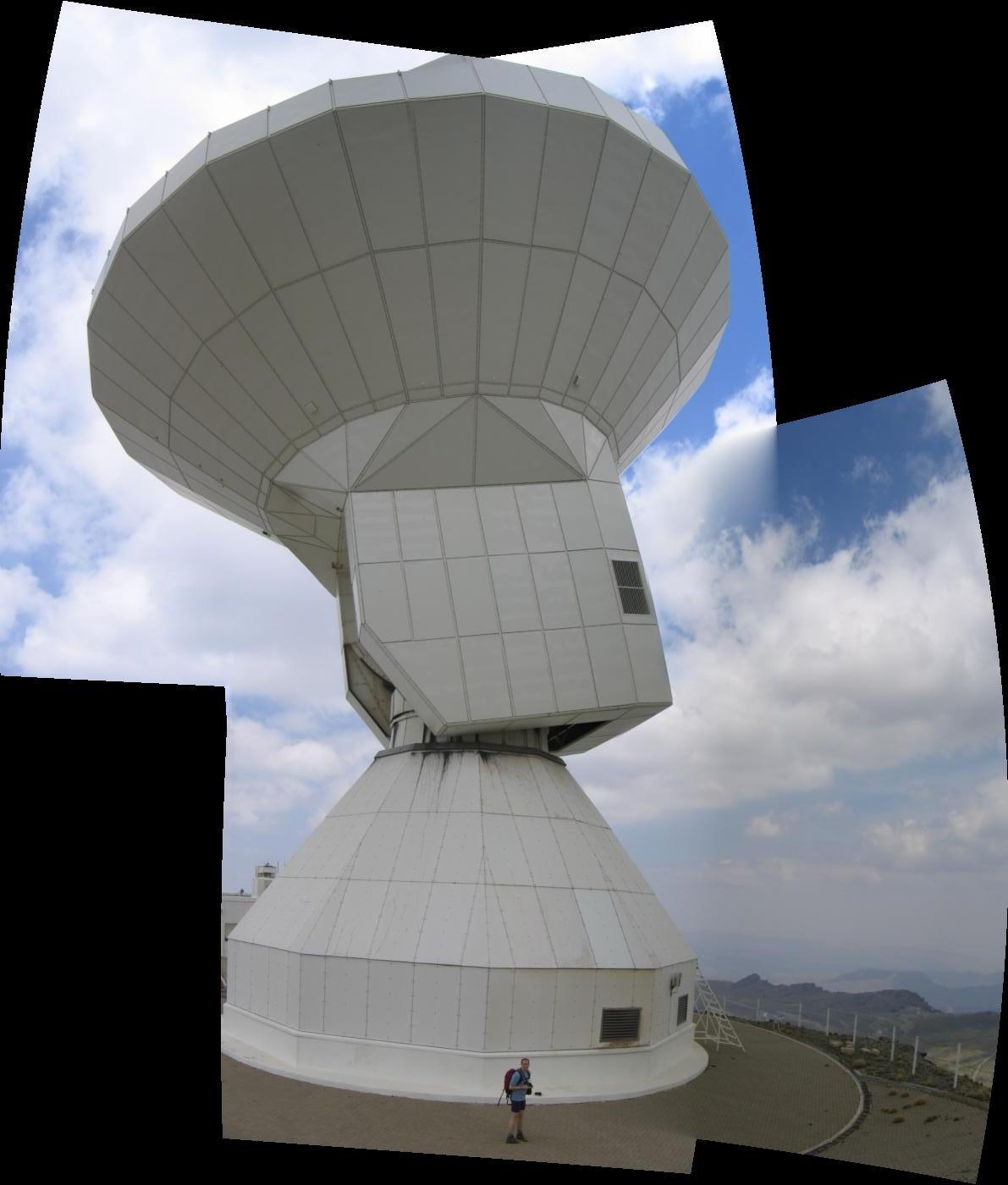
Closeup of the IRAM radio telescope

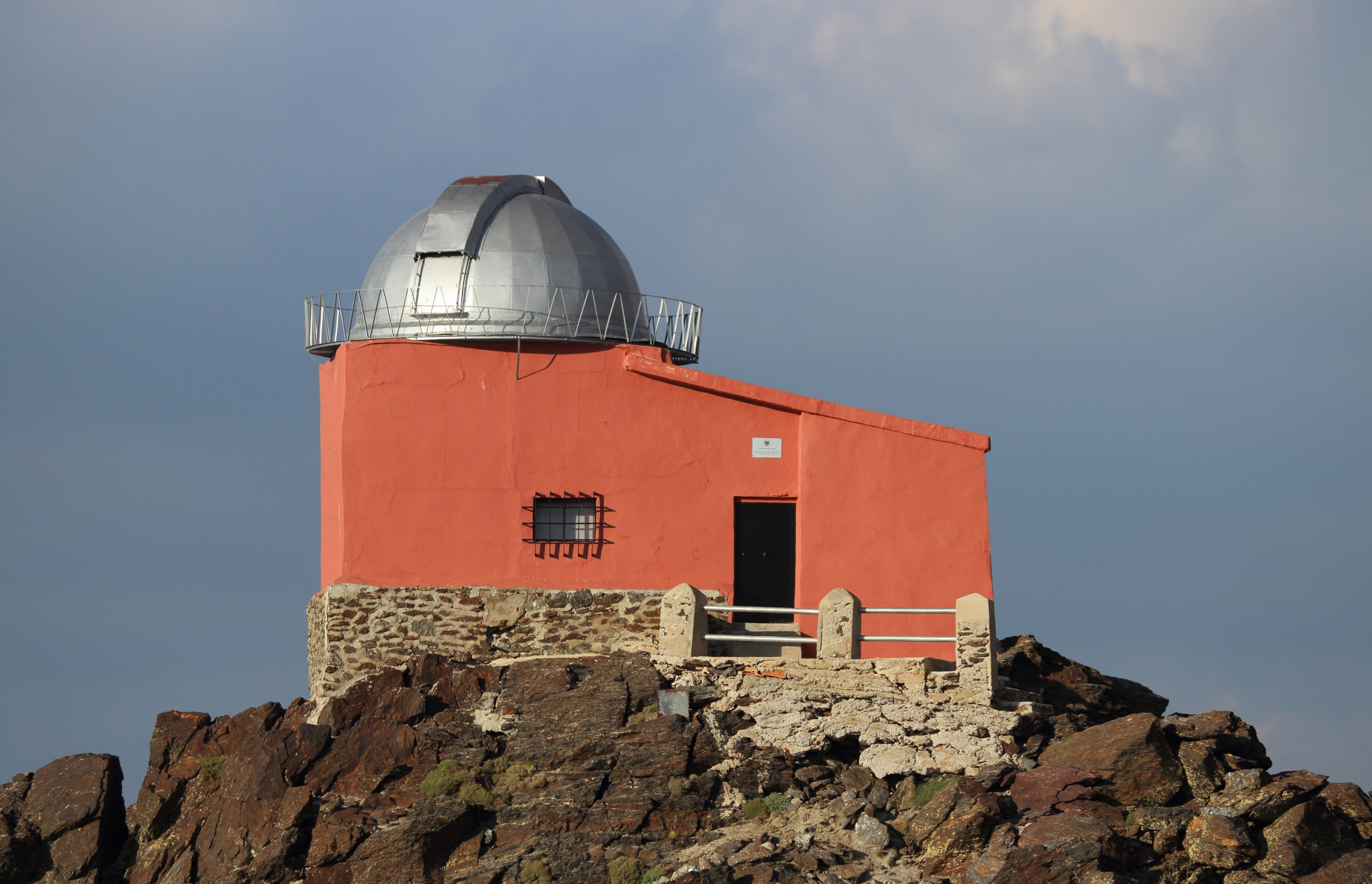
The older observatory of Mojón del Trigo, situated at 37°05′27″N 3°22′55″W

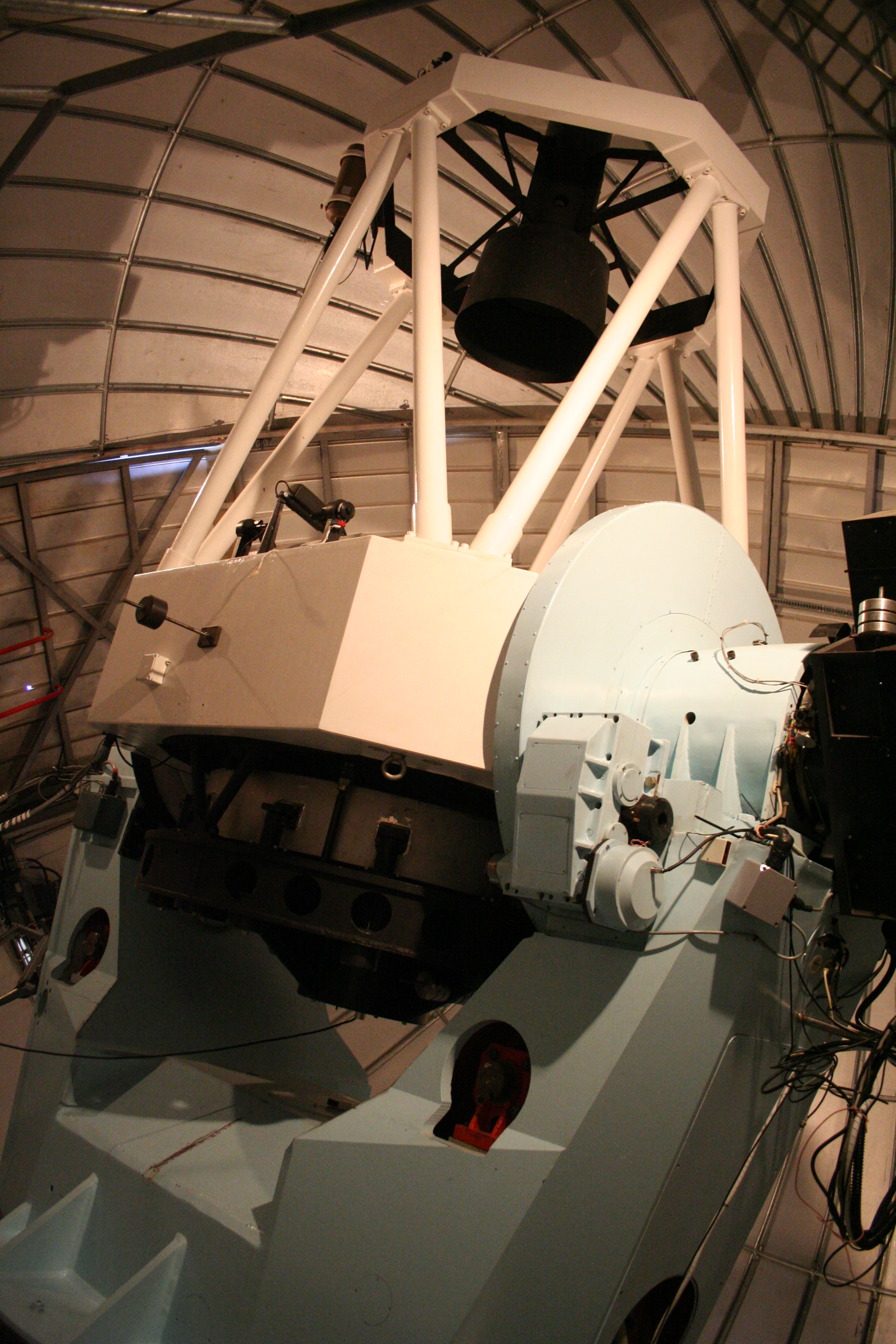
The OSN 1.5-metre telescope

== See also ==
- Haumea
- List of largest optical reflecting telescopes
