= Actaea (moon) =

Moon of 120347 Salacia

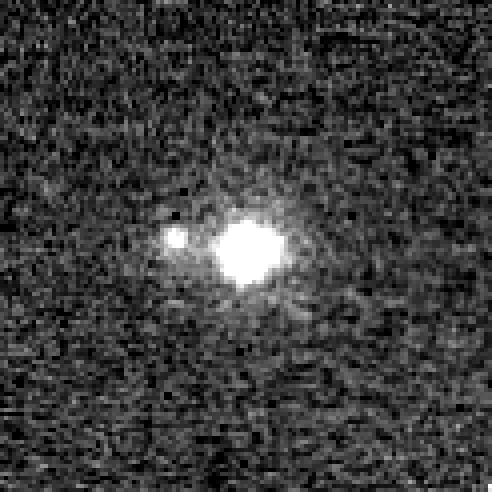
- Salacia and its moon Actaea, imaged by the Keck telescope on 3 August 2010. Actaea is the fainter object to the left of Salacia.

Discovery
- Discovered by: Keith S. Noll, Harold F. Levison, Denise C. Stephen, William M. Grundy
- Discovery date: 21 July 2006

Designations
- Designation: Salacia I
- Pronunciation: /ækˈtiːə/
- Alternative names: S/2006 (120347) 1
- Adjectives: Actaean /ækˈtiːən/

Orbital characteristics
- Semi-major axis: 5700+30 −29 km
- Eccentricity: 0.008±0.003
- Orbital period (sidereal): 5.49389±0.00001 days
- Inclination: 17.2±0.5°
- Longitude of ascending node: 108.9±1.6°
- Argument of perihelion: 41+33 −22°
- Satellite of: Salacia

Physical characteristics
- Mean diameter: 393±33 km
- Mass: ~4.4% of Salacia (Note: assuming that Actaea has a typical satellite density of 0.7 g/cm^{3})
- Mean density: ~0.7 g/cm^{3} (assumed)
- Sidereal rotation period: 5.49389±0.00001 d (synchronous)
- Albedo: 0.021±0.004
- Spectral type: V–I = 0.89±0.02
- Absolute magnitude (H): 6.850±0.053

Actaea, formal designation (120347) Salacia I, is the only known moon of the large classical Kuiper belt object 120347 Salacia. It was discovered by Keith S. Noll, Harold F. Levison, Denise C. Stephen and William M. Grundy using discovery images taken by the Hubble Space Telescope on 21 July 2006.

Its diameter is estimated to be about 393±33 km in diameter, making it the fifth-biggest known moon of a trans-Neptunian object, being after Charon (1212±1 km), Dysnomia (615+60
−50 km), Vanth (442.5±10.2 km), and Ilmarë (403±40 km). Under the assumption that Actaea has a density of 0.7 g/cm^{3}, which is thought to be more typical that of trans-Neptunian objects' moons, The mass ratio between Actaea and Salacia will be approximately 0.044:1. (Note: This means Actaea is approximately 4.4% the mass of Salacia.) It has an extremely low albedo of 0.021±0.004, which is approximately half the albedo of Salacia (0.041±0.004).

== History ==
=== Discovery ===
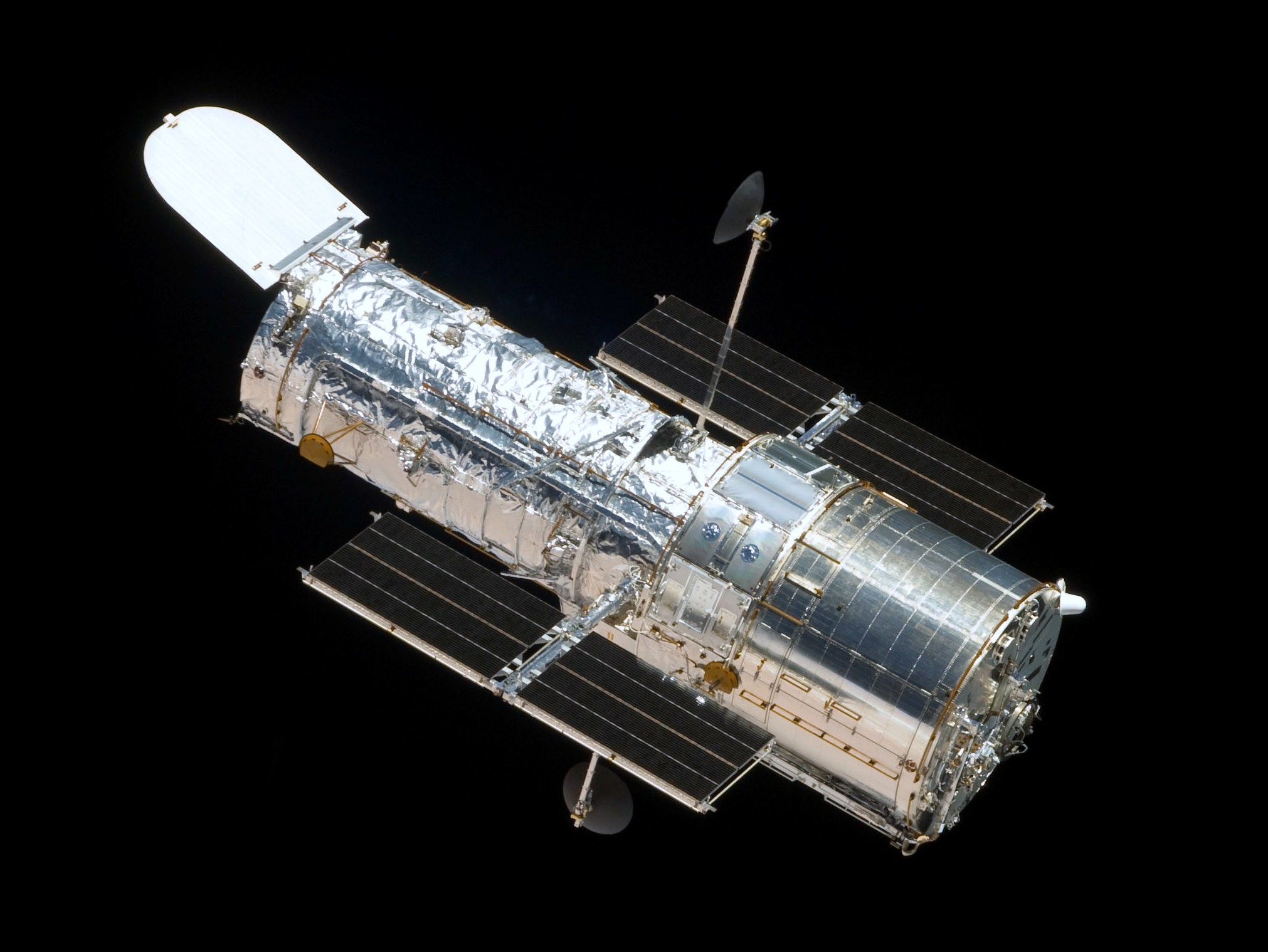
The Hubble Space Telescope, the telescope that discovered Actaea back in 2006.

Actaea was discovered on 21 July 2006 by Keith S. Noll, Harold F. Levison, Denise C. Stephen and William M. Grundy with the Hubble Space Telescope.

=== Naming ===
On 18 February 2011, the moon was officially named Actaea after the Nereid of the same name. In Greek mythology, Actaea (/ækˈtiːə/; Ancient Greek: Ἀκταία, romanized: Aktaía, lit. 'the dweller on coasts', from Ancient Greek: ἀκτή, romanized: akté, lit. 'seashore' or 'rocky shore') was one of the 50 Nereid sea-nymphs. These 50 sea-nymphs are daughters of the "Old Man of the Sea" Nereus and the Oceanid Doris. Actaea and her other sisters appeared to Thetis when she cried out in sympathy for the grief of Achilles for his slain friend Patroclus.

== Orbit ==
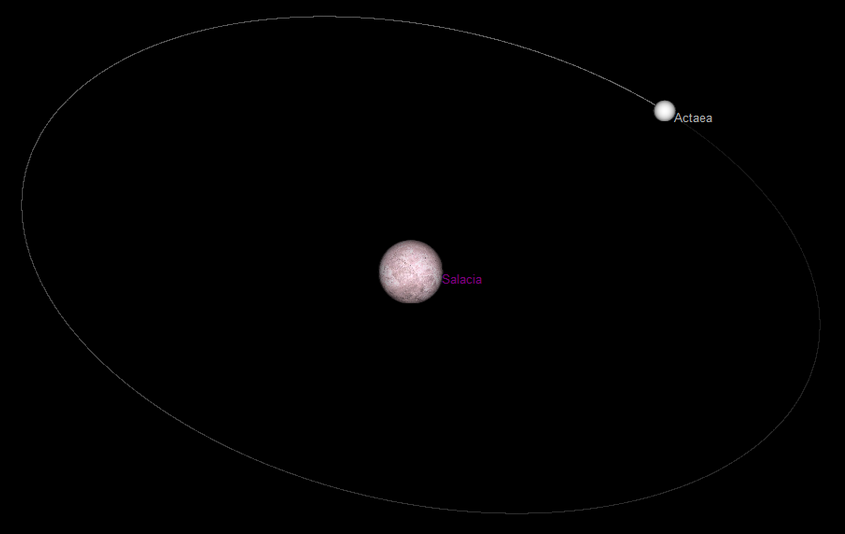
A simulated nearly circular orbit of Actaea at a distance of 5700+30 −29 km away from Salacia.

=== Orbital characteristics ===
Actaea follows a nearly circular orbit around Salacia at a distance of 5700+30
−29 km once every 5.49389±0.00001 days, with an inclination of approximately 17.2° and a low eccentricity of 0.008±0.003. The low eccentricity of Actaea's orbit suggests that the system has undergone tidal evolution since its formation.

The ratio of its semi-major axis to its primary's Hill radius is only about 0.0023, it is the tightest trans-Neptunian binary with a known orbit.

=== Tidal evolution ===
It has been calculated that the Salacia system should have undergone enough tidal evolution to circularize their orbits, which is consistent with the low measured eccentricity, but that the primary need not to be tidally locked. Salacia and Actaea will next occult each other in 2067.

== Physical characteristics ==
=== Size ===
Comparison of sizes, albedos, and colors of various large trans-Neptunian objects with diameters greater than 700 km (430 mi). Its parent body Salacia is shown on the middle row, third from the right, and Actaea is shown next to it. The light and dark colored arcs represent uncertainties of the objects' sizes.

History of diameter estimates for Actaea
Year of Publication	Diameter (km)	References
2012	303±35	
2017	290±21	
2019	284±10	(Note: approximation if Salacia and Actaea were both spherical and had the same albedo)
2019	286±24	
2025	393±33	

Actaea is approximately 2.372±0.060 magnitudes fainter than Salacia, indicating a diameter ratio of 2.98 assuming if Salacia and Actaea has the exact same albedos. Early estimates assumed equal albedos for them, which have corresponded to a diameter of 284±10 km for Actaea. Since Actaea has almost the same neutral (grey) color as Salacia that strongly supports the assumption of equal albedos.

However, more accurate measurements in 2025 that was done by Kiss et al., measured an extremely low albedo of 0.021±0.004 for Actaea, which is approximately half the albedo of Salacia (0.041±0.004), yielding a larger diameter of 393±33 km, that is approximately one-half the diameter of Salacia; thus, Salacia and Actaea are viewed by William Grundy et al. to be a binary system.

Assuming that the following size estimates are correct, Actaea would be about the fifth-biggest known moon of a trans-Neptunian object, after Charon (1212±1 km), Dysnomia (615+60
−50 km), Vanth (442.5±10.2 km), and Ilmarë (403±40 km).

=== Surface and spectrum ===
The color of Actaea's surface is dark grey, with an extremely low geometric albedo of 0.021±0.004, which is only half of Salacia's, and a measured V–I color index of 0.89±0.02, which is considered a neutral color.

=== Mass and density ===
The mass of the system is 4.861+0.076
−0.074×10^{20} kg, assuming equal densities of around ≈1.45 g/cm^{3}, the satellite-to-primary mass ratio is would be 0:10:1. However, this would be an unrealistically high density for the satellite. Under the assumption that Actaea has a density of 0.7 g/cm^{3}, which is thought to be more typical that of trans-Neptunian objects' moons, The mass ratio between Actaea and Salacia will be approximately 0.044:1.

== See also ==
- Ilmarë, a similarly sized moon orbiting 174567 Varda
- Hiʻiaka, a similarly sized moon orbiting the dwarf planet Haumea
