= 174567 Varda =

Trans-Neptunian object

- Hubble Space Telescope image of Varda and its satellite Ilmarë taken in 2011

Discovery
- Discovered by: J. A. Larsen
- Discovery site: Kitt Peak National Obs.
- Discovery date: 21 June 2003

Designations
- Pronunciation: /ˈvɑːrdə/
- Named after: Varda (figure by J. R. R. Tolkien)
- Alternative designations: 2003 MW_{12}
- Minor planet category: TNO classical (hot) detached distant 15:8 resonance with Neptune
- Symbol: (astrological)

Orbital characteristics(barycentric) (Note: These orbital elements are expressed in terms of the Solar System Barycenter (SSB) as the frame of reference. Due to planetary perturbations, the Sun revolves around the SSB at non-negligible distances, so heliocentric-frame orbital elements and distances (such as those given in JPL's Small-Body Database) can vary on short timescales.)
- Epoch 31 May 2020 (JD 2459000.5)
- Uncertainty parameter 2
- Observation arc: 39.12 yr (14,290 d)
- Earliest precovery date: 19 March 1980
- Aphelion: 52.133 AU
- Perihelion: 39.282 AU
- Semi-major axis: 45.707 AU
- Eccentricity: 0.14058
- Orbital period (sidereal): 309.02 yr (112,868 d)
- Mean anomaly: 265.286°
- Mean motion: 0° 0^{m} 11.482^{s} / day
- Inclination: 21.498°
- Longitude of ascending node: 183.974°
- Time of perihelion: 28 July 2096
- Argument of perihelion: 183.731°
- Known satellites: 1 (Ilmarë)

Physical characteristics
- Dimensions: 778 × 706 × 496 km (2026); 766±6 km (Equatorial diameter, 2020)
- Mean diameter: 648 km (2026); 740±14 km (Area equivalent diameter, 2020)
- Flattening: 0.080±0.049 (for period of 11.82 h); 0.235±0.050 (for period of 5.91 h); 0.066±0.047 (occultation); 0.3625 (Note: Calculated using the formula $\frac{a-c}{a}$ based on the dimensions of 778 × 706 × 496 km.); 0.4447 (Note: Calculated using the formula $\frac{a-c}{a}$ based on the dimensions of 778 × 706 × 432 km.)
- Mass: 2.675+0.049 −0.048×10^{20} kg (total system mass)
- Mean density: ≈1.726 g/cm^{3} (2026) (Note: This density is calculated by using dimensions of 778 × 706 × 496 km.) ≈1.15 g/cm^{3} (2025) (Note: Assuming equal densities for both Varda and Ilmarë.)
- Synodic rotation period: 5.750824±0.000016 d (Note: Varda is likely to be mutually tidally locked to its moon Ilmarë.)
- Geometric albedo: 0.099±0.002 (geometric)
- Temperature: 44 K (perihelion)
- Spectral type: CO_{2}-type ("double-dip"); IR (moderately red); B−V=0.886±0.025; V–R=0.55±0.02; V−I=1.156±0.029
- Apparent magnitude: 20.5; 20.41±0.04
- Absolute magnitude (H): 3.81±0.01 (primary); 3.097±0.060 (system); 3.46

174567 Varda is a large trans-Neptunian object, discovered on 21 June 2003 by American astronomer Jeffrey A. Larsen using survey images taken with the 0.9-meter Spacewatch telescope at the Kitt Peak National Observatory. As a dynamically hot classical Kuiper belt object, Varda orbits within the Kuiper belt region. Stellar occultations in 2018 show that Varda is likely an oblate spheroid with a flattening of 0.07 and an area equivalent diameter of 740±14 km. Other triaxial ellipsoid shape models remain mathematically unconstrained. (Note: A 2026 reanalysis proposed a triaxial shape with dimensions of 778 × 706 × 496 km and an equivalent diameter of 648 km, but published datasets cannot fully constrain this three-dimensional structure.) The total mass of the binary system is approximately 2.675+0.048
−0.049×10^{20} kg with Varda contributing around 86 to 90% of it. (Note: Calculated from the mass ratios in Kiss (2025). For an Ilmarë-to-Varda mass ratio of 0.11:1, assuming a typical satellite density of 0.7 g/cm^{3}, Varda's mass contribution is $\frac{1}{1 + 0.11} \approx 90.1\%$. For a ratio of 0.16:1 under equal density assumptions, Varda's contribution is $\frac{1}{1 + 0.16} \approx 86.2\%$ of the total system mass.) Varda's bulk density estimates remain highly ambiguous. James Webb Space Telescope data shows a surface temperature of 44 K. Abundant frozen carbon dioxide dominates its surface.

Because of its large size, some astronomers including Michael E. Brown and Noemi Pinilla-Alonso have considered it a possible dwarf planet. However, it is hypothesized that trans-Neptunian objects in the size range of 400–1000 km, such as Varda, have probably never compressed into fully solid bodies, let alone fall into hydrostatic equilibrium, and so are unlikely to be dwarf planets, though the density calculations for Varda are highly ambiguous. It is not clear if Varda's density is high enough to compressed into a fully solid body.

Varda has one known moon named Ilmarë. The moon's diameter measures approximately 403±40 km. Varda and Ilmarë are likely mutually tidally locked. The binary system exhibits a very large mass ratio, comparable to that of Pluto and Charon.

== Observation history ==
=== Discovery ===
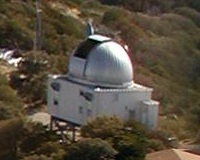
The 1.8 meter Spacewatch telescope that was used to image Varda and Ilmarë on 21 June 2003.

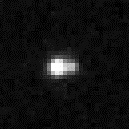
Varda and Ilmarë imaged on 31 August 2010 by the Hubble Space Telescope.

Varda was discovered on 21 June 2003 by American astronomer Jeffrey A. Larsen as part of a United States Naval Academy Trident Scholar project. The discovery used survey images taken with the 0.9-meter Spacewatch telescope at the Kitt Peak National Observatory.

Larsen's survey ran for 34 months and covered approximately 8,000 square degrees of the sky to detect slow-moving trans-Neptunian objects. At the time of its announcement, Varda was the only large object discovered through this specific program and was thought to be the tenth-largest known classical Kuiper belt object. The Minor Planet Center officially announced the discovery on 7 January 2006. Astronomers later identified the earliest known precovery images of Varda from photographs taken at the Siding Spring Observatory on 19 March 1980.

==== Further observations ====
Following its initial tracking under the provisional designation 2003 MW_{12}, Varda was regularly observed to secure its orbital path. Subsequent tracking utilized observations from Siding Spring, the Palomar Observatory, and Near-Earth Asteroid Tracking datasets, forming a total observation arc of 39 years.

=== Occultations ===
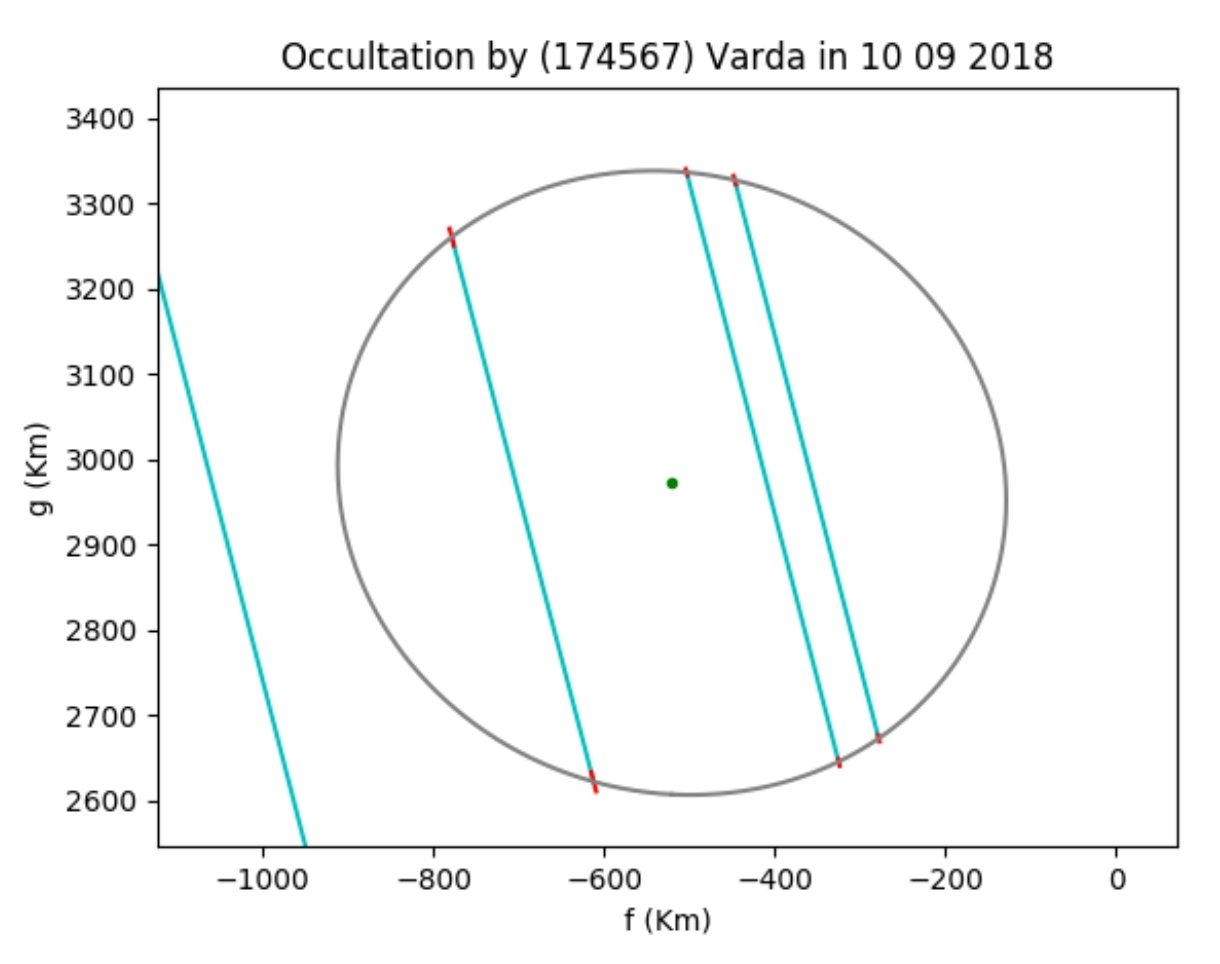
Varda's apparent limb detected from the stellar occultation on 10 September 2018

Stellar occultations by Varda occur when it passes in front of a star and blocks its light, helping astronomers find its exact size, shape, flattening, geometric albedo and other physical properties.

The first successful stellar occultation by Varda was observed across the United States on 10 September 2018, using data from multiple monitoring sites to map the object's shape and density. Data from this event was also used to test for a thin nitrogen atmosphere like Pluto, though the results remained inconclusive due to potential camera instrumentation issues. While multiple occultations were predicted between 2022 and 2025 across South America, East Asia, Africa, and the Arctic, two campaigns on 11 March 2023 and 10 June 2024 specifically tracked separate shadow chords for both Varda and Ilmarë using stars with apparent magnitudes of around 15, with further calculation updates extended through 2027, involving stars with magnitudes ranging between 16.6 and 17.0.

== Nomenclature ==
Before receiving its official name, Varda was known by the provisional designation 2003 MW_{12}. The Minor Planet Center (MPC) assigned it the permanent minor planet number 174567 on 22 January 2008. The names for Varda and its moon were announced by the MPC on 16 January 2014. The object is named after Varda, the queen of the Valar in J. R. R. Tolkien's Middle-earth writings. According to International Astronomical Union (IAU) guidelines, the discoverer can propose a name to a committee that judges whether it is suitable. Within Tolkien's legendarium, Varda functions as an "angelic power" or creator deity subordinate to the supreme God Eru Ilúvatar, responsible for shaping the stars to illuminate the world. Its moon was named Ilmarë, after a chief of the Maiar and Varda's handmaiden.

Planetary symbols are no longer widely used in modern astronomy, so Varda never received an official symbol. Astrologer Zane Stein proposed a stylized star glyph for Varda, though it remained unofficial.

== Orbit and classification ==
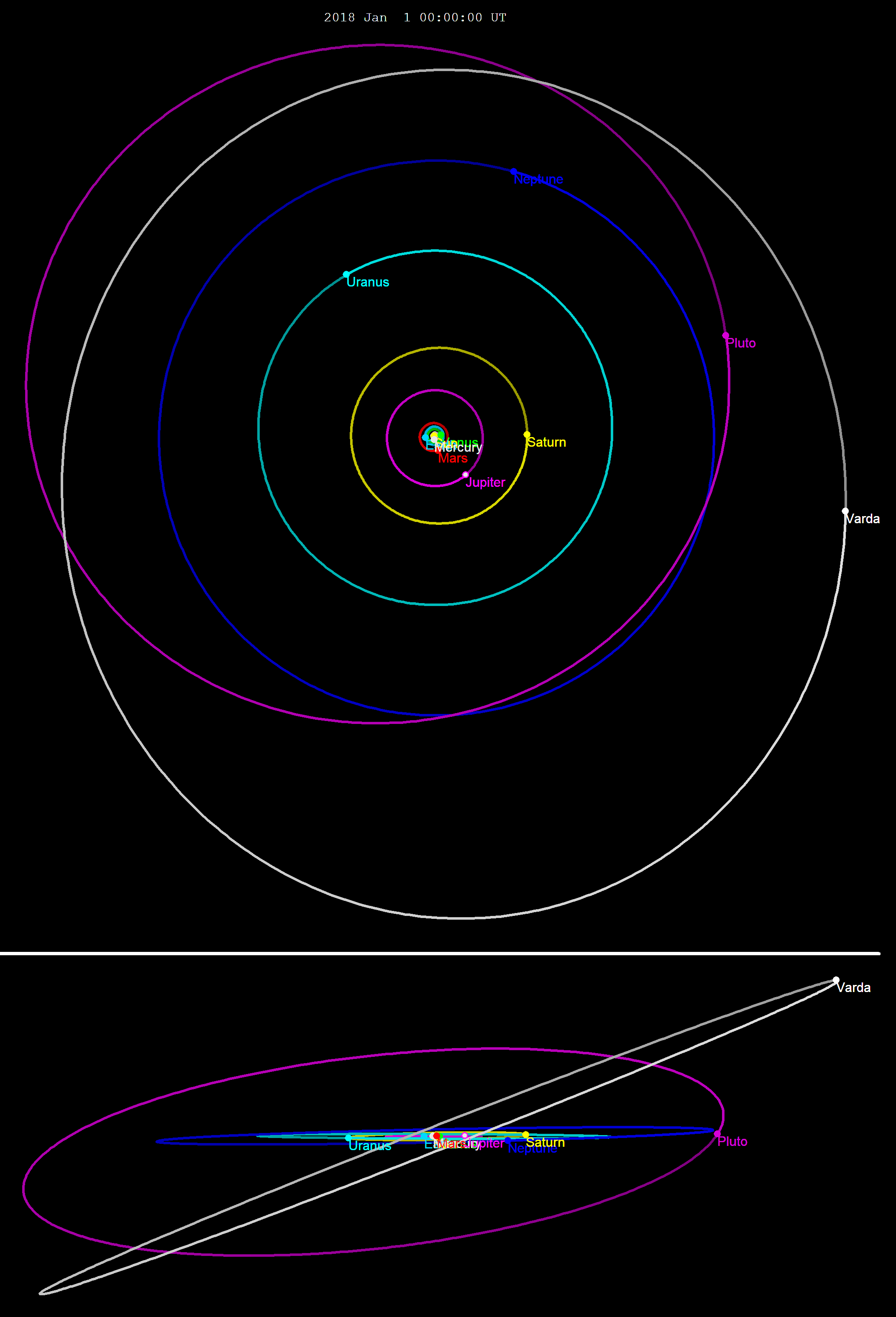
Polar and ecliptic view of the orbit of Varda.

Varda orbits the Sun once every 309.2 years at an average orbital distance of 45.7 AU. In its orbit, Varda comes as close as 39.3 AU from the Sun at perihelion and as far as 52.1 AU from the Sun at aphelion. Its orbit has an eccentricity of approximately 0.14 and an inclination of 21.5° with respect to the ecliptic. As of November 2019, Varda is 47.5 AU from the Sun. It will come to perihelion around 28 July 2096.

Varda is located in the classical region of the Kuiper belt 39–48 AU from the Sun, and is thus classified as a typical member of a classical Kuiper belt object (also known as a "cubewano"). This classical population is most concentrated in a range between 42 and 47 AU. The high orbital inclination of Varda makes it a dynamically "hot" member of the classical Kuiper belt, separating it from the flat "cold" classical objects that have tilts under 5°. The hot classical Kuiper belt objects are believed to have been scattered by Neptune's gravitational influence into their dynamically excited paths during the Solar System's early history. Because its orbit is stable on long timescales, Varda is dynamically distinct from both the unstable scattered disk and the distant detached object families. However, a 2025 study found that Varda could be in a 15:8 resonance with Neptune. This means that for every 15 orbits Neptune completes around the Sun, Varda completes exactly 8.

=== Orbital stability ===
Multiple simulations across large trans-Neptunian objects have found that Varda's orbit is very stable. In tests tracking the outer planets over one billion years, Varda stayed on its orbital path, it is predicted that it will never be ejected from the Solar System or pushed inward. Its estimated stability time is approximately 22.1 billion years, which is longer than the remaining life of the Solar System.

== Physical characteristics ==
=== Size ===
Comparison of sizes, albedos, and colors of various large trans-Neptunian objects with diameters greater than 700 km (430 mi). Varda is shown on the bottom row, first from the left. The light and dark colored arcs represent uncertainties of the object's size.

History of diameter estimates for Varda
Year of Publication	Diameter (km)	Method	References
2014	784±90	Thermal (Herschel system)	
2014	705+81 −75	Thermal (NEATM)	
2015	722+82 −76	Thermal (primary best estimate)	(Note: Assuming equal albedos for the primary and the secondary)
2019	756	Stellar Occultation	
2020	746±16	Stellar Occultation	
2020	740±14	Stellar Occultation	
2026	648	Occultation reanalysis	

Varda has an area equivalent diameter of approximately 740 km (460 mi). For comparison, this is about one-third Pluto's diameter. (Note: Pluto has a diameter of 2,376.6 km (1,476.8 mi). One-third of Pluto's diameter is 792.2 km (492.3 mi), which is roughly around Varda's size.) A multi-chord stellar occultation provided these parameters. This event occurred on 10 September 2018. Astronomers observed the occultation from the United States. The occultation data suggests Varda is an oblate spheroid. Varda features an equatorial diameter of 766±6 km. The apparent projected oblateness equals 0.066±0.047. This circular silhouette derives from a 3.81 absolute magnitude. Varda is a very large trans-Neptunian object and is among the top 34 largest known TNOs.

In a 2026 occultation reanalysis, data suggests that Varda has a highly flattened, triaxial ellipsoid shape with body dimensions of 778 × 706 × 496 km, resulting in a volume equivalent diameter of 648 km, much smaller than other size estimates. Using a different formula would result in axes of 778 × 706 × 432 km. Varda's long axis is directed toward its moon, Ilmarë. The chance for this alignment to happen by accident is calculated to be 2%. However, the published data are not able to fully constrain its three-dimensional shape.

Varda is possibly massive enough to pull itself into a nearly spherical object under its own gravity, this is called collapsing into hydrostatic equilibrium, which is one of the requirements for becoming a dwarf planet, thus, some astronomers including Michael E. Brown and Noemi Pinilla-Alonso have considered it a possible dwarf planet. However, William M. Grundy hypothesized that trans-Neptunian objects in the size range of 400–1000 km, such as Varda, have probably never compressed into fully solid bodies, let alone differentiated or fall into hydrostatic equilibrium, and so are unlikely to be dwarf planets, though the density calculations for Varda are highly ambiguous. It is not clear if Varda's density is high enough to compressed into a fully solid body. Its low albedo is however consistent with a lack of the geological activity that is thought to be typical of larger dwarf planets.

=== Mass and density ===
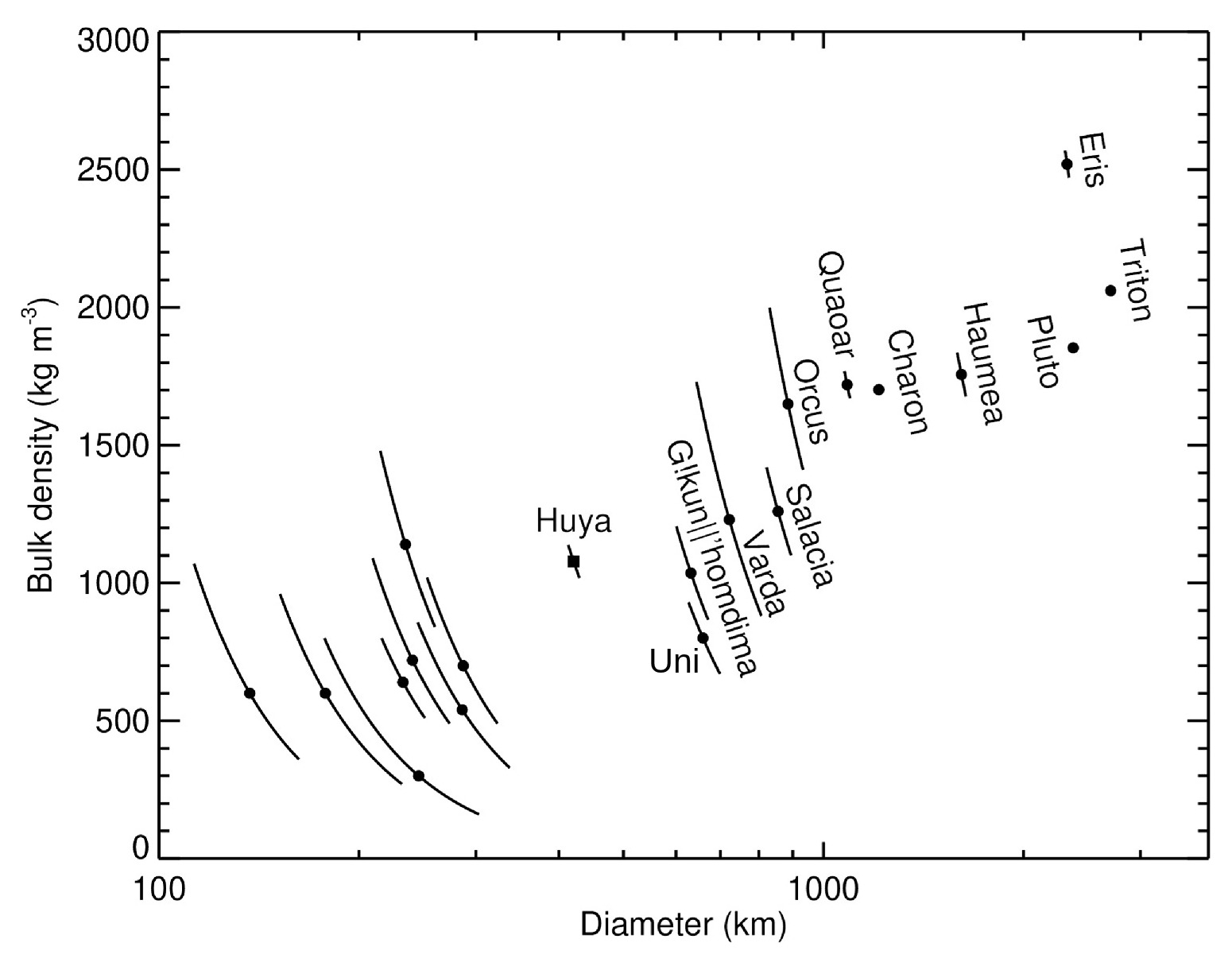
TNO densities (vertical axis) plotted by increasing diameter (horizontal axis). As the diameter of TNOs increase, their density increases as well. Salacia's density is now thought to be higher, closer to that of Orcus. Varda's density is highly ambiguous as seen from the graph.

The total mass of the binary system is precisely and accurately determined. The combined mass of the Varda system is 2.675+0.048
−0.049×10^{20} kg, with Varda probably contributing around 86.2% and 90.1% of this total system mass. The mass of the Varda system is about 1.62 percent that of Eris, (Note: The mass of Eris is 16466×10^{18} kg, and the mass of the Varda system is approximately 267.5×10^{18} kg, this results that the Varda system is about 1.62 percent that of Eris: $\frac{267.5 \times 10^{18}\text{ kg}}{16466 \times 10^{18}\text{ kg}} \approx 1.62\%$) the most massive known dwarf planet (1.6466×10^{22} kg).

However, independent bulk density estimates of Varda remain highly ambiguous. These calculated densities depend entirely on assumed shape models. While the 2020 occultation models suggested 1.78 g/cm^{3} under a single-peaked 5.91-hour rotation, alternative double-period models of 11.82 hours yielded a lower 1.23 g/cm^{3}. A subsequent 2025 analysis derived a lower 1.15 g/cm^{3} based on their estimated sizes, assuming if Varda and Ilmarë have the same densities. A 2026 study instead found a density of 1.726 g/cm^{3} for Varda's triaxial shape model, which could possibly increase up to 1.9 g/cm^{3} under other Jacobi ellipsoid formulas. Unfortunately, these recent 2026 estimates lack formal mathematical uncertainties. The nearly pole-on viewing geometry limits vertical constraints, leaving Varda's short c-axis unmeasured along our line of sight.

=== Surface ===
==== Composition and spectrum ====
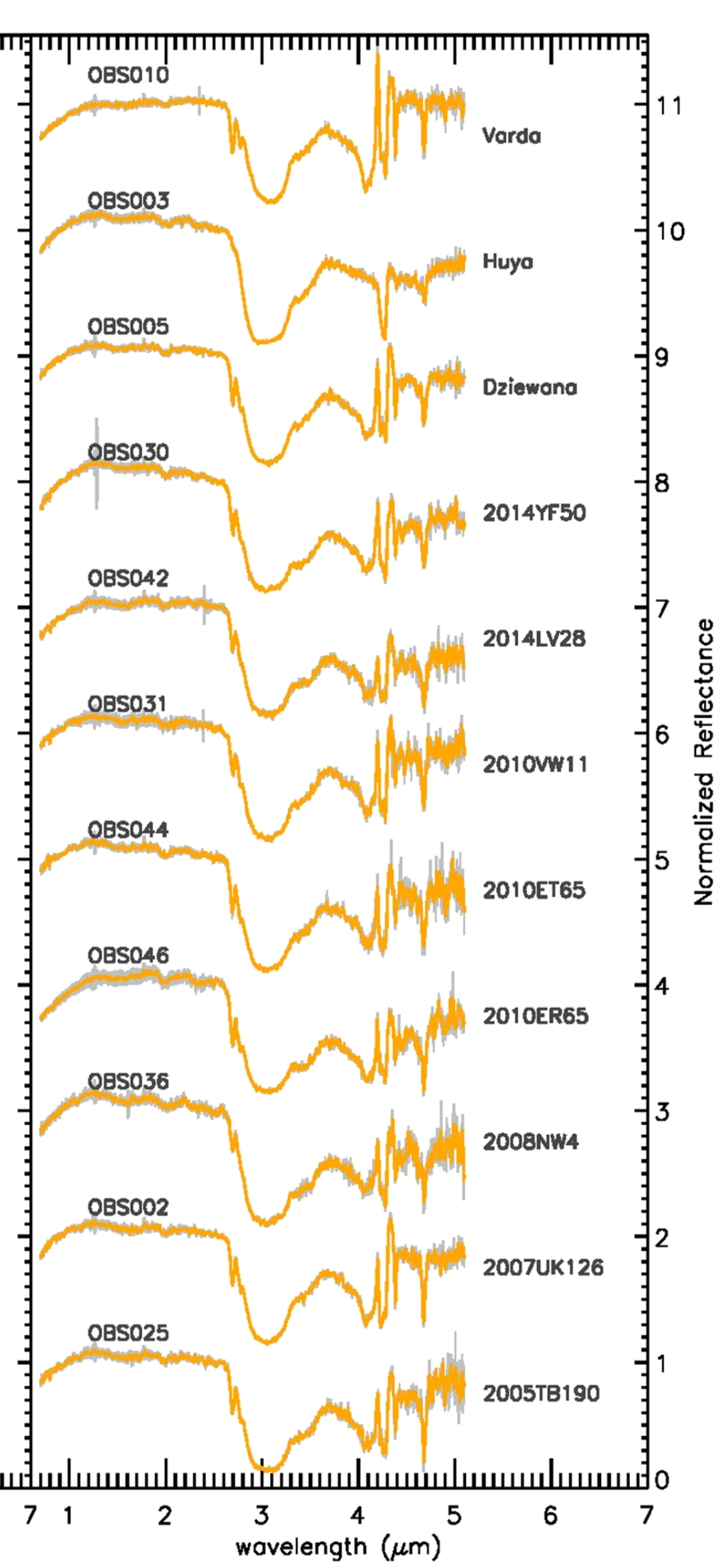
The near-infrared spectrum of multiple double dip TNOs, Varda's is shown at the top.

Varda shares its composition with the CO_{2}-type (aka "double-dip") trans-Neptunian objects, which are most commonly found on dynamically excited orbits such as those in the hot classical Kuiper belt, this is where Varda resides. (Note: The "double-dip" TNO spectral type were later renamed to the "CO_{2}-type" in 2025.) This specific group features very large carbon dioxide abundances. Varda's independent carbon dioxide ice shows a 2.7 μm wavelength signal. Its measured carbon dioxide absorption area equals 0.00548 μm. Typically, double-dip spectra center a main absorption wavelength at 4.27 μm. Another statistical feature for this group appears at 4.06 μm. A rarer carbon dioxide type shows near the 4.38 μm wavelength. The standard group ice matrix traps volatile carbon monoxide gas. Furthermore, Varda completely lacks frozen methane and ammonia.

Varda has very little methanol ice on its surface. The methanol ice signal at 2.27 μm is small. Varda's precise methanol band area measures just 0.00008 μm. Earth telescopes in 2008 suggested methanol was present. However, those older ground signals were too weak. Newer space data shows these signals come from organics. Varda's surface has almost no water ice. Its water ice band index is only at −0.00072 μm. The telescope data lacks typical water ice shapes. Instead, complex organic materials show up near 3.4 μm. The measured aliphatic carbon–hydrogen band area equals 0.01021 μm. Small signals near 4.93 μm suggest group trace olivine rock.

==== Color, albedo and brightness ====
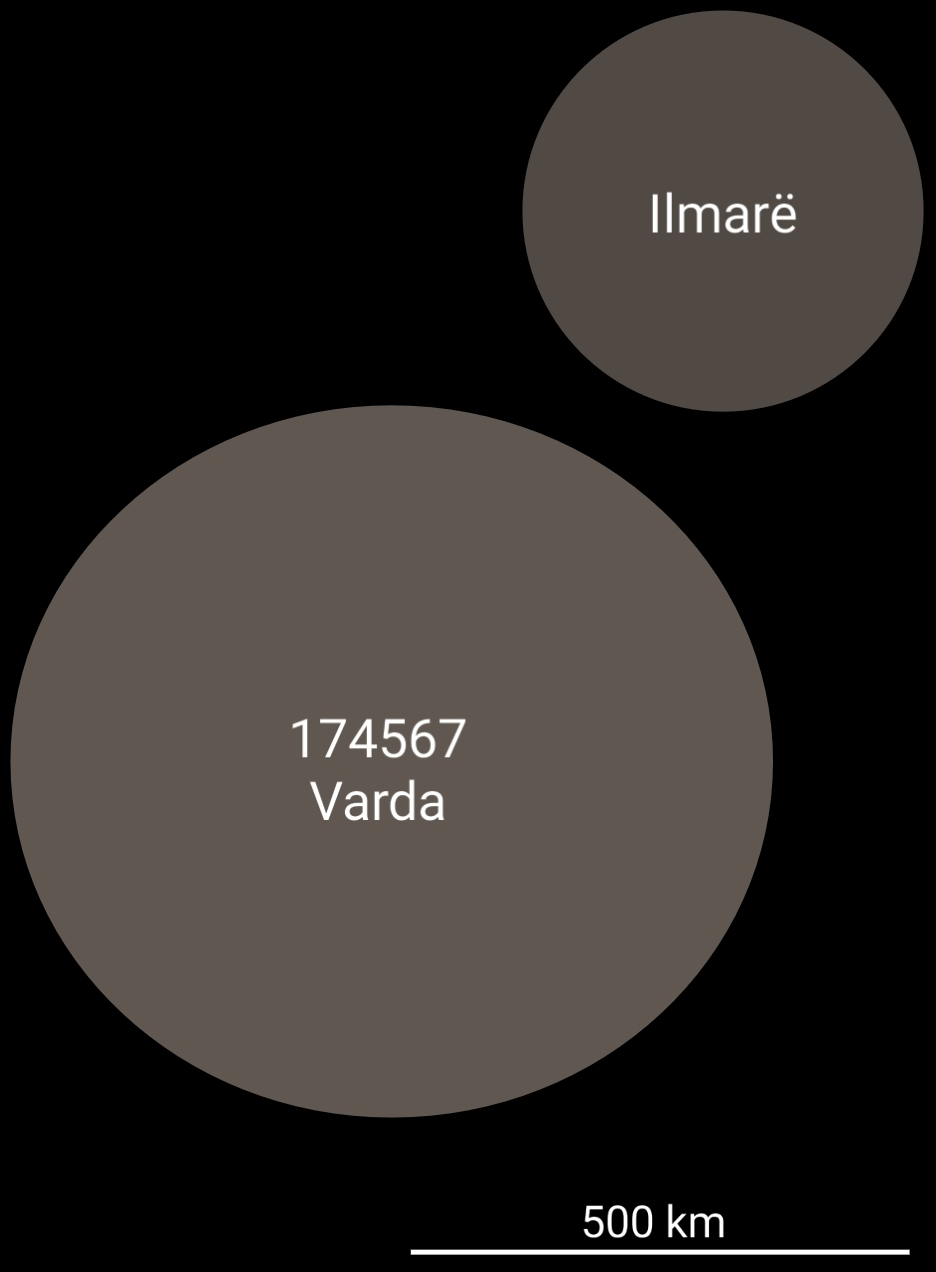
Varda and Ilmarë size and color comparison image showing their moderately red surface.

In visible light, Varda appears moderately red. (Note: In planetary astronomy, the term "red" is used to describe objects that reflect more light at longer (redder) wavelengths, but does not necessarily mean "literally red". For example, astronomers have called Pluto "red", even though it appears brown to the human eye.) Its measured color index values are B−V=0.886±0.025 and V–R=0.55±0.02. This places Varda within the IR spectral class, for comparison, this B-V color index is similar to that of the dwarf planet Makemake's. Near-infrared spectral features serve as markers of surface complex organic compounds.

Varda's geometric albedo is measured at 0.099±0.002, consistent with the older estimate of 0.102+0.024
−0.020 but with a much smaller uncertainty range. This makes it as dark as the large plutino 208996 Achlys. Early spheroid models suggested minor surface albedo variegation caused its weak brightness variability. However, this could be outdated since newer studies measured a smaller diameter, which affects the albedo estimate of the object. The surface temperature of Varda at perihelion is approximately 44 K.

With an apparent magnitude of approximately 20.5, Varda requires professional telescopes or specialized imaging setups to be detected. It has an absolute magnitude of 3.81±0.01. Because its moon Ilmarë is located very close to Varda from Earth's perspective and is approximately 1.7 magnitudes fainter in visible light, resolving the two separate bodies requires high-resolution imaging. The combined absolute magnitude of the Varda–Ilmarë system is 3.097±0.060.

=== Rotation ===
As it rotates, Varda exhibits slight brightness variability with an amplitude of 0.06±0.01 magnitudes. Varda's true rotation period remains highly ambiguous and uncertain. A 2014 study suggest several possible light curve solutions, a single-peaked rotation model yields 5.91 hours. Another elongated shape model doubles this period. (Note: Doubling the single-peaked 5.91-hour period results in a 11.82-hour double-peaked rotation model.) Data aliases also produce 4.76 and 7.87 hours. A 2026 study found that Varda is likely to be tidally locked to its moon Ilmarë.

Assuming the dimensions given by the triaxial model, 778 × 706 × 496 km, Varda's 5.75-day rotation is too slow to cause its elongated shape under standard hydrostatic equilibrium if Varda is mutually tidally locked to Ilmarë. Hydrostatic equilibrium at this elongation would require a much faster 4.5-hour period. So, astronomers consider a non-hydrostatic equilibrium structure to explain the possible triaxial shape. The flattening and triaxiality could represent a primordial fossil bulge frozen during an early epoch of rapid rotation, similar to the dwarf planet Quaoar. Alternatively, internal friction and uneven rock density distributions maintain this unconstrained triaxial shape. (Note: The updated triaxial shape model increases Varda's calculated bulk density to about 1.726 g/cm³.)

=== Lack of atmosphere ===
Occultation observations from 2018 have shown that Varda lacks a global atmosphere. During the 2018 occultation event, the starlight cut off abruptly behind Varda's limb. The lack of an atmosphere is consistent with theoretical predictions that TNOs smaller than 2,000 km (1,200 mi) in diameter generally cannot gravitationally hold onto atmospheres over billion-year timescales.

== Binary system ==
=== Moon ===
Varda has one known satellite, Ilmarë, (Note: Stressed on the first syllable) formal designation (174567) Varda I. Ilmarë was discovered by Keith Noll in 2009, at a separation of about 0.12 arcsec, using discovery images taken by the Hubble Space Telescope on 26 April 2009, the discovery was reported in 2011. Ilmarë has a low albedo of 0.068±0.011 and is approximately 403 km in diameter according to the ALMA study done in 2025, making it the fourth-largest known moon of a trans-Neptunian object, after Charon, Dysnomia, and Vanth.

Under the assumption of a lower density of 0.7 g/cm^{3} for Ilmarë, which is thought to be more typical that of trans-Neptunian objects in the ~400 km size range, the Ilmarë-to-Varda mass ratio would be around 0.11:1. Even if Ilmarë has the same density as Varda at 1.15 g/cm^{3}, the mass ratio would be relatively high at 0.16:1. This makes it one of the systems with the largest known mass ratios, with the mass ratio being quite similar to Pluto-Charon or Orcus-Vanth.

==== Orbital characteristics ====
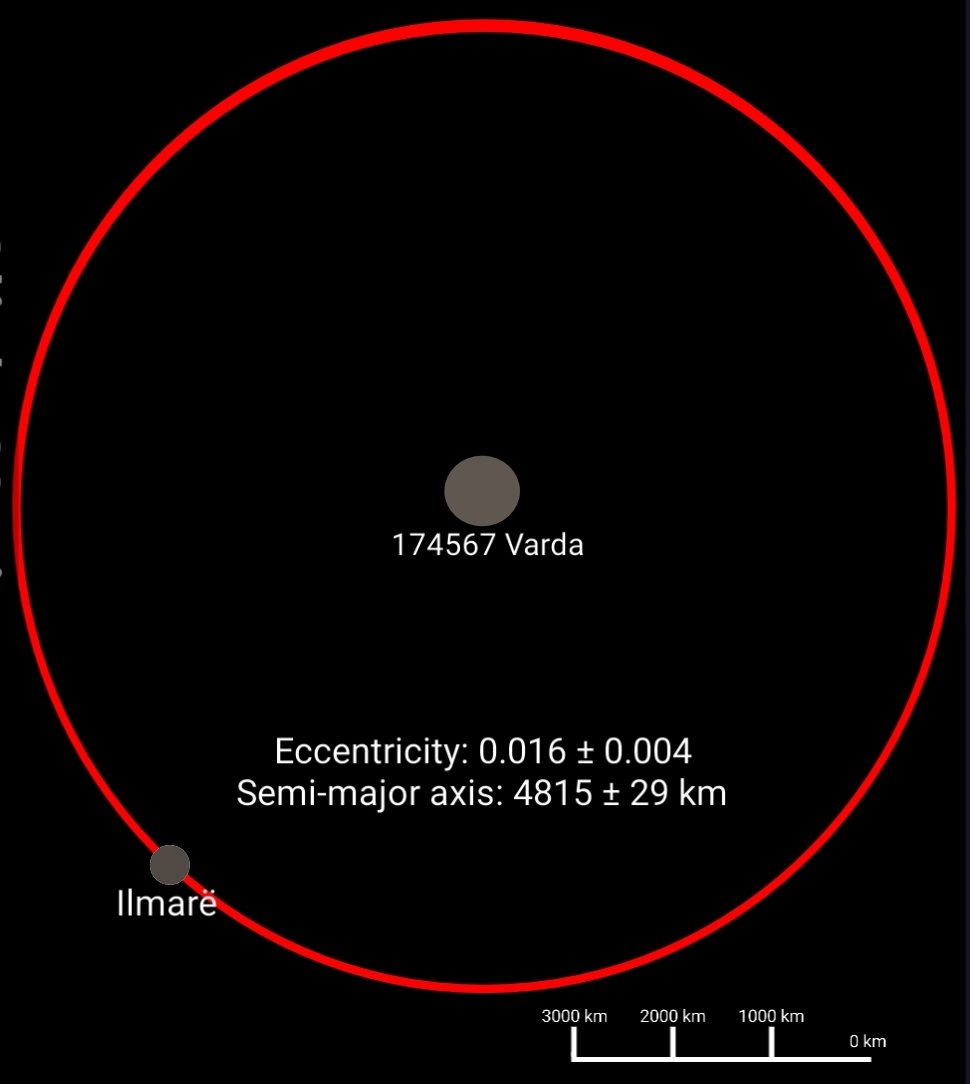
The orbit diagram for Ilmarë with the newest orbits parameters Varda is the oblate spheroid at the center of the image

Ilmarë orbits Varda at a distance of 4815±29 km and an eccentricity of 0.016±0.004 respectively. Ilmarë has an orbital period of approximately 5.750824±0.000016 d. Ilmarë's orbit has an inclination of 77.4±1.9° with respect to the ecliptic. In a 2021 trans-Neptunian binary study, the Varda system was grouped among massive binaries characterized by close relative separations. The report noted that these tightly bound systems display distinct formation mechanisms from smaller, widely separated equal-mass binary pairs.

Varda system
Name	Diameter (km)	Semi-major axis (km)	Discovery date
Varda	740±14 or 648	~	21 June 2003
Ilmarë	403±40	4815±29	26 April 2009

=== Tidal evolution and likely mutual tidal locking ===
Observations from a 2018 stellar occultation show that Varda's longest equatorial axis points almost directly toward its moon Ilmarë. Varda's elongated axis has a position angle of 67°±8°, while Ilmarë is located at a position angle of 60.8°±0.7°. If Varda were not tidally locked, the chance of this very close alignment happening is only around 2%. Furthermore, the large size ratio between Varda and its moon Ilmarë strongly suggests that tidal synchronization should happen really quickly, especially at the small semi-major axis of the binary, similar to the Salacia-Actaea system. This alignment is almost matches the minimum energy state expected for a tidally evolved binary system.

The Pluto–Charon system — an example of mutual tidal locking, similar to the Varda–Ilmarë system.

== Origin ==
Varda formed 4.5 billion years ago as an icy small body before outer planet migration began. Early accretion models predicted that trans-Neptunian objects would stay on flat, circular orbital paths. However, classical population bodies between 37 and 50 AU, including Varda, exhibit high orbital inclinations and high eccentricity paths. To explain these tilted orbits, dynamic models suggest planetary embryos with Mars-to-Earth masses disrupted the early disk before being scattered outward by the outer planets.

James Webb Space Telescope observations place Varda in the "double-dip" spectral group, as discussed in the physical characteristics section, proving it originated in the intermediate region of the early protoplanetary disk. This formation distance was situated between the primordial water and carbon dioxide ice retention lines. This location allowed Varda to retain carbon dioxide ice efficiently, though its medium-sized mass was insufficient to retain more volatile methane or ammonia ice over billion-year timescales. The discovery of transition objects within this classification indicates localized mixing occurred during early disk accretion. Furthermore, Varda's heavy retention of surface carbon dioxide ice acted as a matrix that trapped and preserved highly volatile carbon monoxide molecules.

== Exploration concepts ==
Scientists have used computer models to plan potential space missions to Varda and its moon, Ilmarë. These studies compare different launch years and flight paths to find the most efficient ways to reach the distant system using the gravity of other planets to gain speed. A 2019 study by Amanda Zangari found that a spacecraft departing Earth between 2027 and 2031 could fly past Jupiter to reach Varda in 10.1 to 12.3 years. The same study tested a different path using both Jupiter and Saturn between 2037 and 2040, but found that flying past Saturn actually increased the total travel time to 14.9 years. This simulation showed that taking a more direct route using only Jupiter saves travel time, and any probe following these paths would fly past Varda at a speed of 16.3 km/s.

A separate flight simulation study published in 2021 by James Lyne studied different launch years to find options that require less rocket energy. The study identified a highly efficient flight path that uses the gravity of both Earth and Jupiter to whip the spacecraft out into the deep Solar System. Under this specific plan, a spacecraft would launch on 8 January 2051 with a low launch energy requirement. The probe would travel through space for exactly 17 years, safely coasting past the outer planets before performing a high-speed flyby of Varda in the year 2068. When the spacecraft reaches Varda and Ilmarë, it would pass by them at a relative speed of 12.66 km/s.

== See also ==
- 55565 Aya – a similar trans-Neptunian object by orbit, size, and color
- 532037 Chiminigagua – a trans-Neptunian object that has a diameter similar to Varda (742 km)
- 145452 Ritona - another double dip TNO similar to Varda
- List of trans-Neptunian objects
- List of solar system objects by size
- List of minor planets: 174001–175000
- List of possible dwarf planets
- Double planet
- Minor-planet moon
