= Tug of war (disambiguation) =

Tug of war is a sport that directly puts two teams against each other in a test of strength and stamina.

Tug of war may also refer to:

== Film, television and stage ==
- Tug of War (2006 film), a short film by British director Scott Mann
- Tug of War (2021 film), a Tanzanian drama
- "Tug of War" (Upstairs, Downstairs), a 1974 episode of the television series Upstairs, Downstairs
- "Tug-o-War", an athletic event in the television series American Gladiators
- Tug of War, a 2007 play based on a translation of Plautus' Rudens

== Astronomy ==
- Tug-of-war value, an informal value in astronomy originally suggested by author Isaac Asimov
- Tug of war (astronomy), the ratio of planetary and solar attractions on a natural satellite

== Music ==
=== Albums ===
- Tug of War (Paul McCartney album), 1982
- Tug of War (Enchant album), 2003
- Tug of War (Carly Rae Jepsen album), 2008
- Tug of War (Colton Ford album), 2008

=== Songs ===
- "Tug of War" (Paul McCartney song)
- "Tug of War", a song by Ratt from the 1999 album Ratt
- "Tug-O-War", a song by Chevelle from their 2004 album This Type of Thinking (Could Do Us In)
- "Tug of War" (Carly Rae Jepsen song)
- "Tug of War", a song by Algebra from her album Purpose (2008)

== See also ==
- Tug of War International Federation, the international governing body for the sport of tug of war
