= Double planet =

Binary system where two planetary-mass objects share an orbital axis external to both

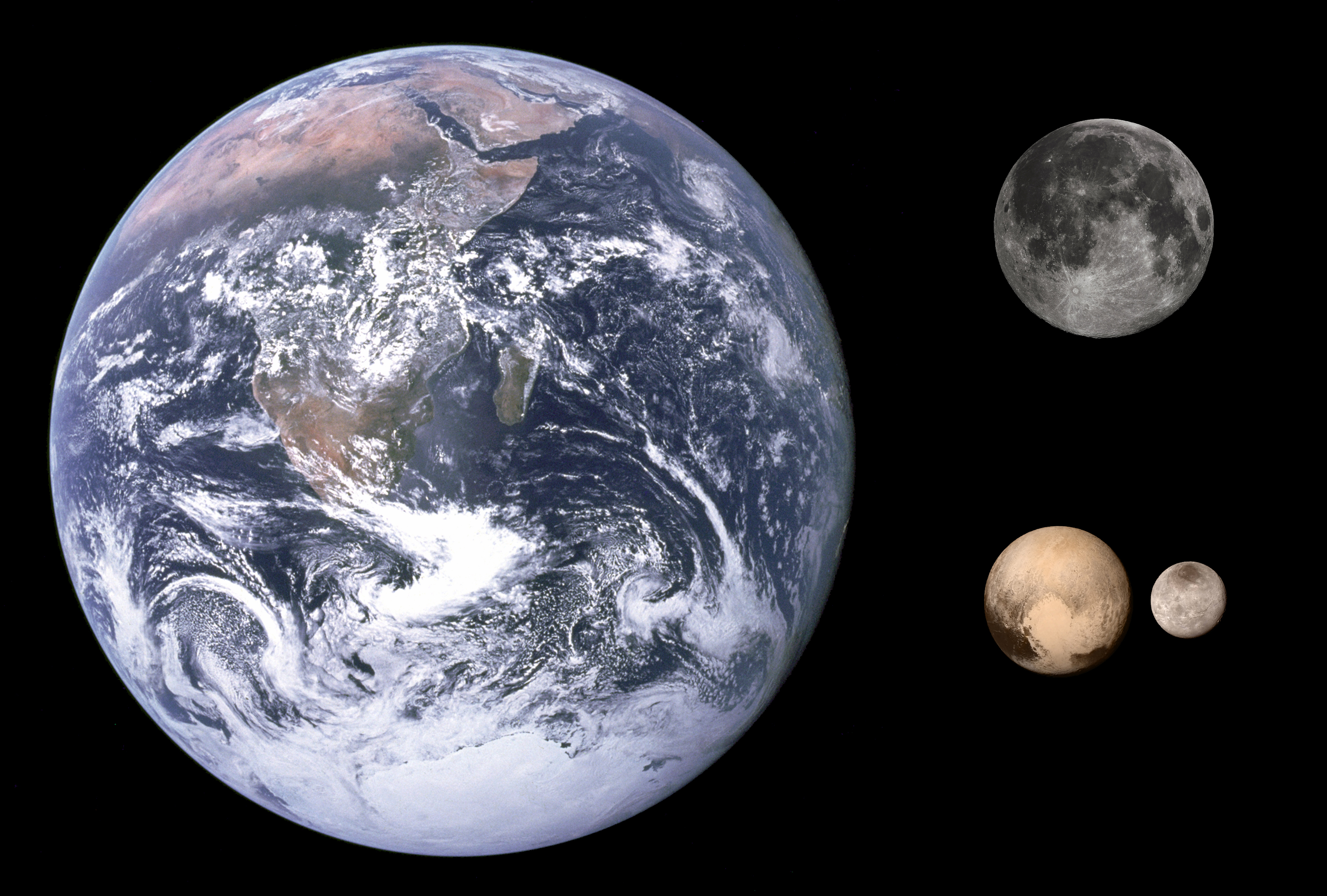
Visual comparison of the sizes of Earth and the Moon (above right) and Pluto–Charon (below right)

In astronomy, a double planet (also binary planet) is a binary satellite system where both objects are planets, or planetary-mass objects, and whose barycenter is external to both planetary bodies.

Although up to a third of the star systems in the Milky Way are binary, double planets are expected to be much rarer. Given the typical planet to satellite mass ratio is around 1:10,000, they are influenced heavily by the gravitational pull of the parent star and according to the giant-impact hypothesis are gravitationally stable only under particular circumstances.

The Solar System does not have an official double planet, however the Earth–Moon system is sometimes considered to be one. In promotional materials advertising the SMART-1 mission, the European Space Agency referred to the Earth–Moon system as a double planet.

Several dwarf planet candidates can be described as binary planets. At its 2006 General Assembly, the International Astronomical Union considered a proposal that Pluto and Charon be reclassified as a double planet, but the proposal was abandoned in favor of the current IAU definition of planet. Other trans-Neptunian systems with proportionally large planetary-mass satellites include Eris–Dysnomia, Orcus–Vanth and Varda–Ilmarë.

Binary asteroids with components of roughly equal mass are sometimes referred to as double minor planets. These include binary asteroids 69230 Hermes and 90 Antiope and binary Kuiper belt objects (KBOs) 79360 Sila–Nunam and 1998 WW31.

== Definition of "double planet" ==
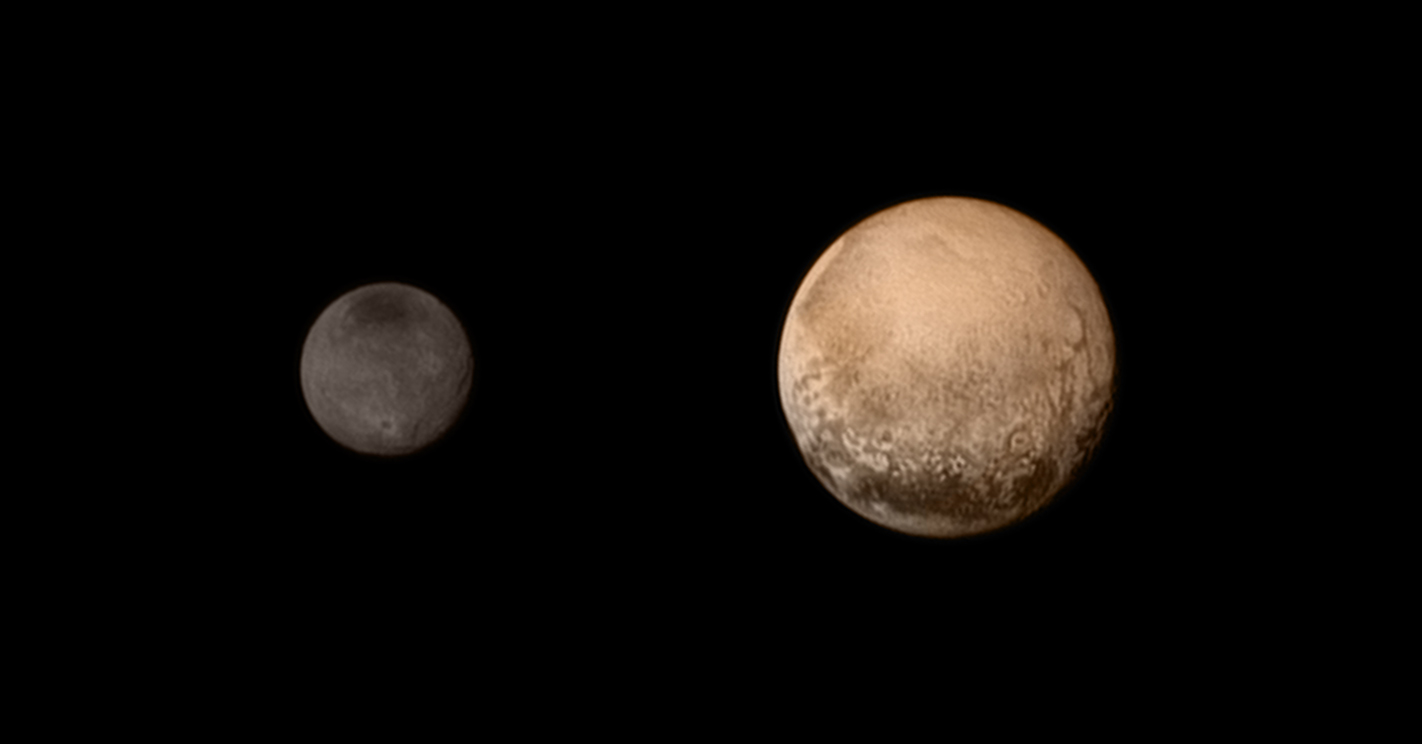
The Pluto–Charon system is closer to binary than the Earth–Moon system (distance not to scale).

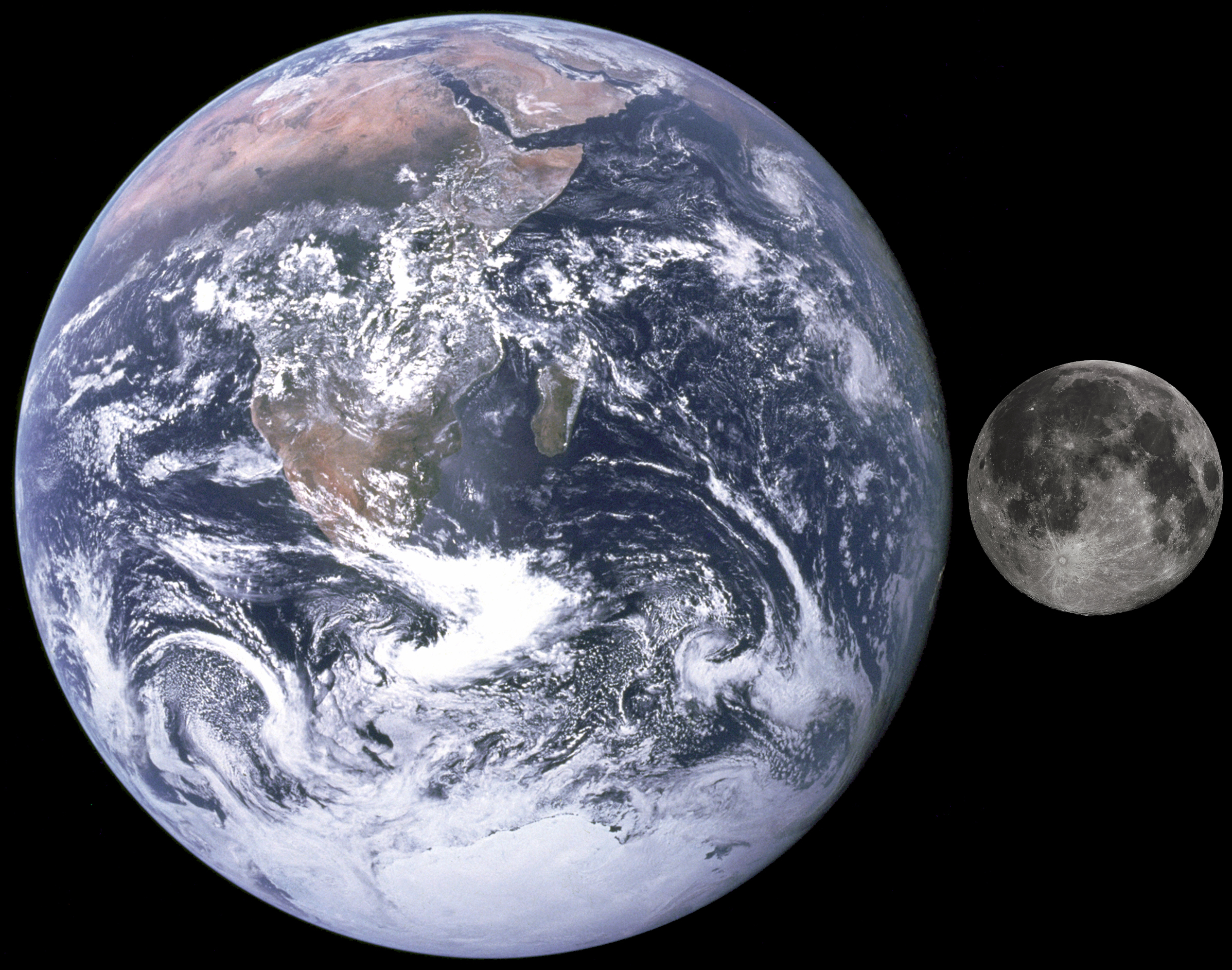
The Earth–Moon system is sometimes informally referred to as a double planet (masses are roughly proportional to volumes, not surface area).

There is debate as to what criteria should be used to distinguish a "double planet" from a "planet–moon system". The following are considerations.

=== Both bodies satisfy planet criterion ===
A definition proposed in the Astronomical Journal calls for both bodies to individually satisfy an orbit-clearing criterion in order to be called a double planet.

=== Mass ratios closer to 1 ===
One important consideration for defining "double planets" is the ratio of the masses of the two bodies. A mass ratio of 1 would indicate bodies of equal mass, and bodies with mass ratios closer to 1 are more attractive to label as "doubles". Using this definition, the satellites of Mars, Jupiter, Saturn, Uranus, and Neptune can all easily be excluded; they all have masses less than 0.00025 (1/4000) of the planets around which they revolve. Some dwarf planets, too, have satellites substantially less massive than the dwarf planets themselves.

The most notable exception is the Pluto–Charon system. The Charon-to-Pluto mass ratio of 0.122 (≈ 1/8) is close enough to 1 that Pluto and Charon have frequently been described by many scientists as "double dwarf planets" ("double planets" prior to the 2006 definition of "planet"). The International Astronomical Union (IAU) earlier classified Charon as a satellite of Pluto, but had also explicitly expressed the willingness to reconsider the bodies as double dwarf planets in the future. However, a 2006 IAU report classified Charon–Pluto as a double planet.

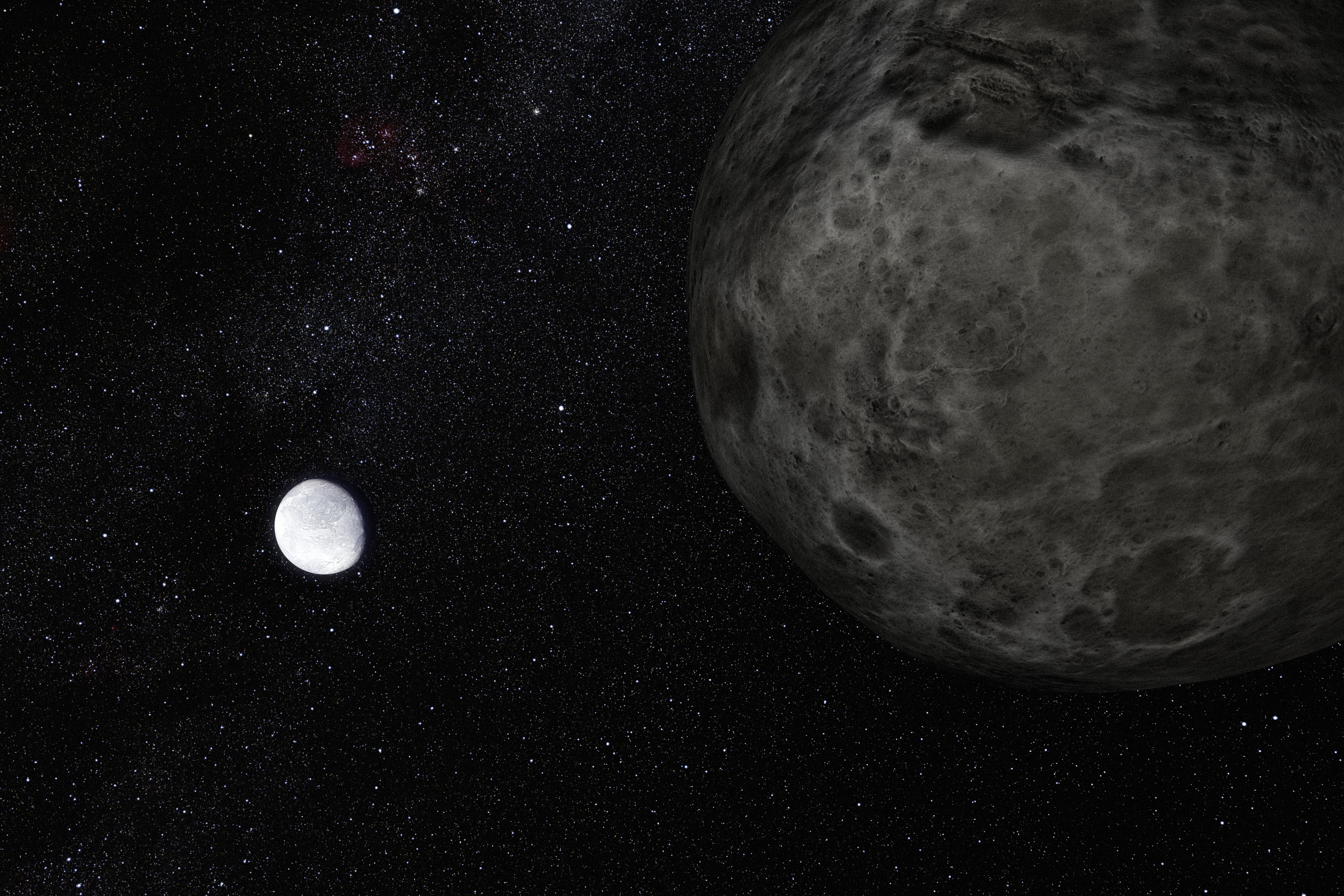
Artist's impression of the Eris-Dysnomia system

The Moon-to-Earth mass ratio of 0.01230 (≈ 1/81) is also notably close to 1 when compared to all other satellite-to-planet ratios. Consequently, some scientists view the Earth–Moon system as a double planet as well, though this is a minority view. Eris's lone satellite, Dysnomia, has a radius somewhere around 1/4 that of Eris; assuming similar densities (Dysnomia's compositional make-up may or may not differ substantially from Eris's), the mass ratio would be near 1/40, a value intermediate to the Moon–Earth and Charon–Pluto ratios.

=== Center-of-mass position ===
Currently, the most commonly proposed definition for a double-planet system is one in which the barycenter, around which both bodies orbit, lies outside both bodies. Under this definition, Pluto and Charon are double dwarf planets, since they orbit a point clearly outside of Pluto, as visible in animations created from images of the New Horizons space probe in June 2015.

Under this definition, the Earth–Moon system is not currently a double planet; although the Moon is massive enough to cause the Earth to make a noticeable revolution around this center of mass, this point nevertheless lies well within Earth. However, the Moon currently migrates outward from Earth at a rate of approximately 3.8 cm (1.5 in) per year; in a few billion years, the Earth–Moon system's center of mass will lie outside Earth, which would make it a double-planet system.

Pluto–Charon system: the barycenter lies outside of Pluto.

The center of mass of the Jupiter–Sun system lies outside the surface of the Sun, though arguing that Jupiter and the Sun are a double star is not analogous to arguing Pluto–Charon is a double dwarf planet. Jupiter is too light to be a fusor; were it thirteen times heavier, it would achieve deuterium fusion and become a brown dwarf.

=== Tug-of-war value ===
Isaac Asimov suggested a distinction between planet–moon and double-planet structures based in part on what he called a "tug-of-war" value, which does not consider their relative sizes. This quantity is simply the ratio of the force exerted on the smaller body by the larger (primary) body to the force exerted on the smaller body by the Sun. This can be shown to equal

$$\text{tug-of-war value} = \frac{m_\mathrm{p}}{m_\mathrm{s}} \cdot \left( \frac{d_\mathrm{s}}{d_\mathrm{p}} \right)^2$$

where m_{p} is the mass of the primary (the larger body), m_{s} is the mass of the Sun, d_{s} is the distance between the smaller body and the Sun, and d_{p} is the distance between the smaller body and the primary. The tug-of-war value does not rely on the mass of the satellite (the smaller body).

This formula actually reflects the relation of the gravitational effects on the smaller body from the larger body and from the Sun. The tug-of-war figure for Saturn's moon Titan is 380, which means that Saturn's hold on Titan is 380 times as strong as the Sun's hold on Titan. Titan's tug-of-war value may be compared with that of Saturn's moon Phoebe, which has a tug-of-war value of just 3.5; that is, Saturn's hold on Phoebe is only 3.5 times as strong as the Sun's hold on Phoebe.

Asimov calculated tug-of-war values for several satellites of the planets. He showed that even the largest gas giant, Jupiter, had only a slightly better hold than the Sun on its outer captured satellites, some with tug-of-war values not much higher than one. In nearly every one of Asimov's calculations the tug-of-war value was found to be greater than one, so in those cases the Sun loses the tug-of-war with the planets. The one exception was Earth's Moon, where the Sun wins the tug-of-war with a value of 0.46, which means that Earth's hold on the Moon is less than half as strong as the Sun's. Asimov included this with his other arguments that Earth and the Moon should be considered a binary planet.

We might look upon the Moon, then, as neither a true satellite of the Earth nor a captured one, but as a planet in its own right, moving about the Sun in careful step with the Earth. From within the Earth–Moon system, the simplest way of picturing the situation is to have the Moon revolve about the Earth; but if you were to draw a picture of the orbits of the Earth and Moon about the Sun exactly to scale, you would see that the Moon's orbit is everywhere concave toward the Sun. It is always "falling toward" the Sun. All the other satellites, without exception, "fall away" from the Sun through part of their orbits, caught as they are by the superior pull of their primary planets – but not the Moon. (Note: Asimov uses the term "concave" to describe the Earth–Moon orbital pattern around the Sun, whereas Aslaksen uses "convex" to describe the same pattern. Which term one uses relies solely upon the perspective of the observer. From the point-of-view of the Sun, the Moon's orbit is concave; from outside the Moon's orbit, say, from planet Mars, it is convex.)

— Isaac Asimov

See the Path of Earth and Moon around Sun section in the "Orbit of the Moon" article for a more detailed explanation.

This definition of double planet depends on the pair's distance from the Sun. If the Earth–Moon system happened to orbit farther away from the Sun than it does now, then Earth would win the tug of war. For example, at the orbit of Mars, the Moon's tug-of-war value would be 1.05. Also, several tiny moons discovered since Asimov's proposal would qualify as double planets by this argument. Neptune's small outer moons Neso and Psamathe, for example, have tug-of-war values of 0.42 and 0.44, less than that of Earth's Moon. Yet their masses are tiny compared to Neptune's, with an estimated ratio of 1.5×10^{−9} (1/700,000,000) and 0.4×10^{−9} (1/2,500,000,000).

=== Formation of the system ===
A final consideration is the way in which the two bodies came to form a system. Both the Earth–Moon and Pluto–Charon systems are thought to have been formed as a result of giant impacts: one body was impacted by a second body, resulting in a debris disk, and through accretion, either two new bodies formed or one new body formed, with the larger body remaining (but changed). However, a giant impact is not a sufficient condition for two bodies being "double planets" because such impacts can also produce tiny satellites, such as the four small outer satellites of Pluto.

A now-abandoned hypothesis for the origin of the Moon was actually called the "double-planet hypothesis"; the idea was that the Earth and the Moon formed in the same region of the Solar System's proto-planetary disk, forming a system under gravitational interaction. This idea, too, is a problematic condition for defining two bodies as "double planets" because planets can "capture" moons through gravitational interaction. For example, the moons of Mars (Phobos and Deimos) are thought to be asteroids captured long ago by Mars. Such a definition would also deem Neptune–Triton a double planet, since Triton was a Kuiper belt body the same size and of similar composition to Pluto, later captured by Neptune.

== See also ==
- 2006 definition of planet
- 3753 Cruithne
- Co-orbital configuration
- Definition of a planet
- Ecliptic
- Hill sphere
- Natural satellite
- Orbit of the Moon
- Quasi-satellite
- Satellite system (astronomy)
