= Ilmarë =

Moon of 174567 Varda

- Hubble Space Telescope image of Varda and its satellite Ilmarë, taken in 2010 and 2011

Discovery
- Discovered by: Keith S. Noll et al.
- Discovery date: 2009, based on images taken on 26 April 2009

Designations
- Designation: Varda I
- Pronunciation: /ˈɪlməriː/
- Named after: Ilmarë (figure by J. R. R. Tolkien)
- Alternative names: (174567) Varda I
- Adjectives: Ilmarëan /ɪlməˈriːən/

Orbital characteristics
- Semi-major axis: 4815±29 km
- Eccentricity: 0.016±0.004
- Orbital period (sidereal): 5.750824±0.000016 d
- Inclination: 77.4±1.9
- Satellite of: Varda

Physical characteristics
- Mean diameter: 403±40 km
- Mass: ≈2.2×10^{19} kg (2015); ~16% of Varda (2025) (Note: Assuming equal densities as Varda.); ~11% of Varda (2025) (Note: Under the assumption of a lower density of 0.7 g/cm^{3}, which is thought to be more typical that of trans-Neptunian objects in the ~400 km size range like Ilmarë.)
- Mean density: 1.24+0.50 −0.35 g/cm^{3} (system) (Note: If Varda and Ilmarë have equal albedos and equal densities.); 0.7 g/cm^{3} (Note: This assumed density is thought to be more typical that of trans-Neptunian objects in the ~400 km size range.); 1.15 g/cm^{3} (Note: If Varda and Ilmarë have equal densities, based on a new diameter estimate of ilmarë.)
- Albedo: 0.068±0.011 (2025) ≈0.085 (2020)
- Spectral type: B−V = 0.857±0.061; V−I = 1.266±0.052
- Absolute magnitude (H): Varda + 1.7

Ilmarë, (Note: Stressed on the first syllable) formal designation (174567) Varda I, is the only known moon of the large Kuiper belt object 174567 Varda. It was discovered by Keith Noll et al. in 2009, at a separation of about 0.12 arcsec, using discovery images taken by the Hubble Space Telescope on 26 April 2009, and reported in 2011.

At approximately 403 km in diameter, it is the fourth-largest known moon of a trans-Neptunian object, after Pluto I Charon, Eris I Dysnomia, and Orcus I Vanth. Under the assumption of a lower density of 0.7 g/cm^{3}, which is thought to be more typical that of trans-Neptunian objects in the ~400 km size range, the satellite-to-primary mass ratio would be approximately 0.11:1.

== Observational history ==
=== Discovery ===
Ilmarë was discovered by a team of astronomers led by William M. Grundy using imaging data captured by the Hubble Space Telescope on 26 April 2009. The discovery team also included S. D. Benecchi, M. W. Buie, Keith S. Noll, S. B. Porter, H. G. Roe, J. A. Stansberry, and Chad Trujillo. The moon was first spotted at an angular separation of about 0.12 arcseconds from Varda. Although the old discovery photos were taken in April 2009, the moon's existence was not officially announced until October 2011 at the EPSC-DPS Joint Meeting

=== Further observations ===
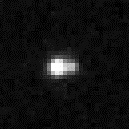
Varda and Ilmarë imaged on 31 August 2010 by the Hubble Space Telescope.

Astronomers continued to observe Ilmarë after its discovery to map its orbital path around Varda. Along with regular tracking by the Pan-STARRS 1 survey between 2010 and 2015, the moon was targeted by specific observation campaigns. On 10 September 2018, astronomers used a non-geocentric occultation observation to collect precise physical characteristics and orbital characteristics of the system. Automated sky surveys, including ATLAS and the Zwicky Transient Facility, continued to track the moon through 2024 to refine its orbital period and distance from Varda.

== Nomenclature ==
Names for Varda and its moon were announced on 16 January 2014. Ilmarë (Quenya: [ˈilmarɛ]) is a chief of the Maiar and handmaiden to Varda, the queen of the Valar, creator of the stars, and principal goddess of the elves in J. R. R. Tolkien's fictional mythology.

== Orbit ==
=== Orbital characteristics ===
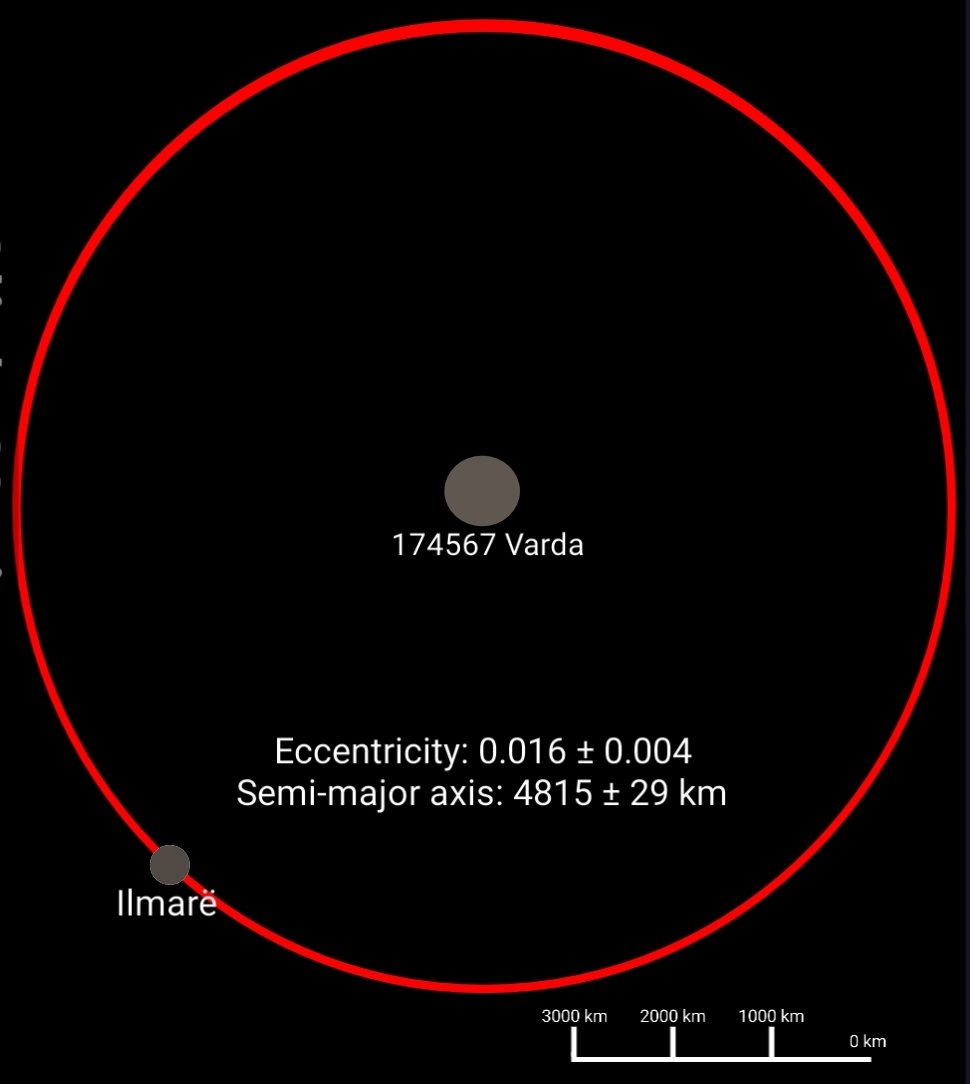
The orbit diagram for Ilmarë with the newest orbits parameters Varda is the elongated ellipsoid at the center of the image

Ilmarë orbits Varda at a distance of 4815±29 km, with a low eccentricity of 0.016±0.004. It has an orbital period of approximately 5.750824±0.000016 d. Its orbit is inclined by 77.4±1.9° with respect to the ecliptic. In a 2021 trans-Neptunian binary study, the Varda system was grouped among massive binaries characterized by close relative separations. The report noted that these tightly bound systems display distinct formation mechanisms from smaller, widely separated equal-mass binary pairs.

=== Tidal evolution ===
Observations from a 2018 stellar occultation show that Varda's longest equatorial axis points almost directly toward its moon Ilmarë. Varda's elongated axis has a position angle of 67°±8°, while Ilmarë is located at a position angle of 60.8°±0.7°. If Varda were not tidally locked, the chance of this very close alignment happening is only around 2%. Furthermore, the large size ratio between Varda and its moon Ilmarë strongly suggests that tidal synchronization should happen really quickly, especially at the small semi-major axis of the binary, similar to the Salacia–Actaea system. This alignment matches the minimum energy state expected for a tidally evolved binary system.

== Physical characteristics ==
Comparison of sizes, albedos, and colors of various large trans-Neptunian objects with diameters greater than 700 km (430 mi). Its parent body Varda is shown on the bottom row, first from the left, and Ilmarë is located next to it. The light and dark colored arcs represent uncertainties of the objects' sizes.

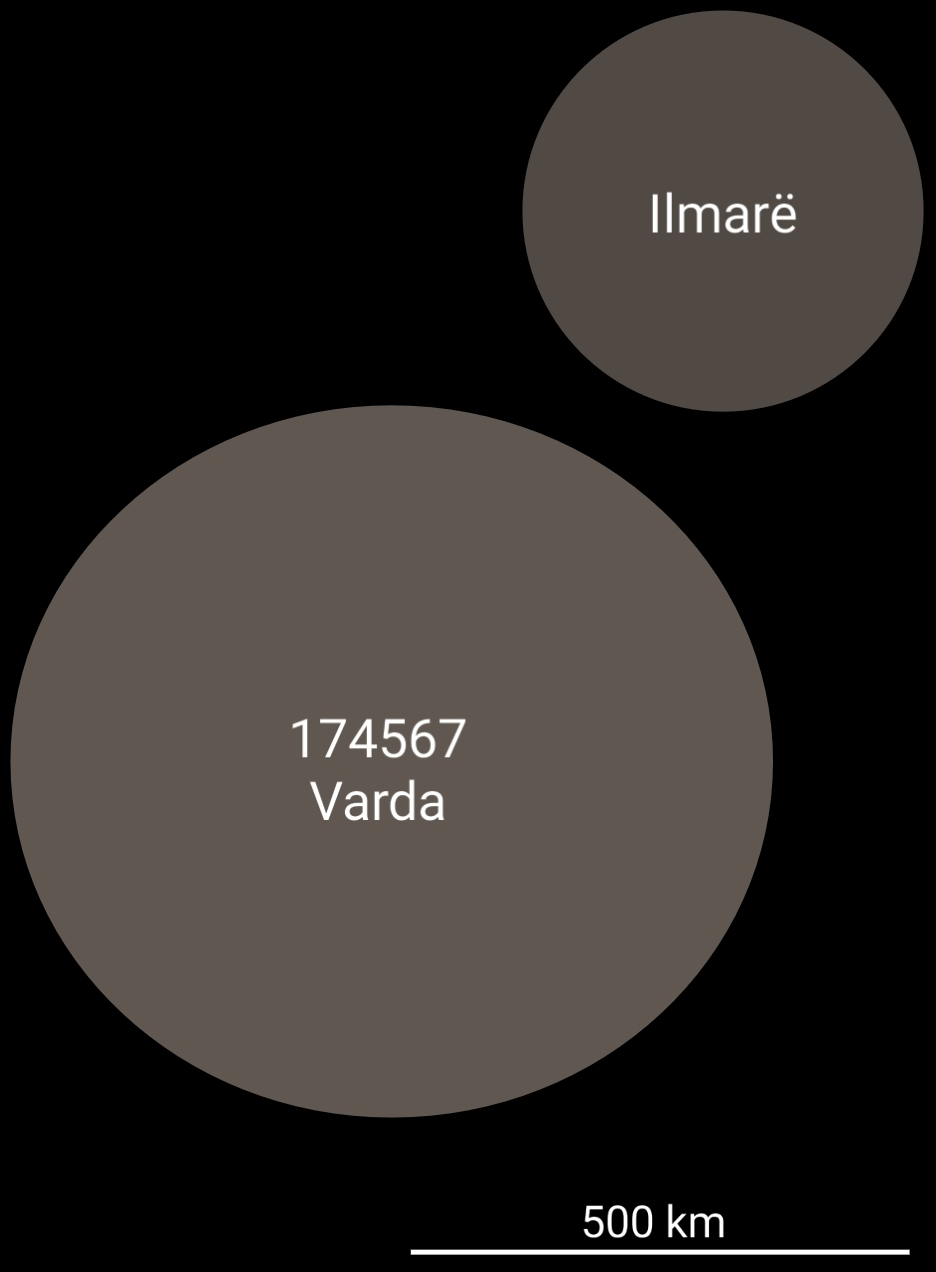
Varda and Ilmarë size and color comparison image showing their moderately red surface.

=== Older estimates for Ilmarë's physical characteristics ===
If Ilmarë and Varda have the same albedo, Ilmarë would be 163+19
−17 km in radius, or approximately 8.4% the volume of Varda. If the two bodies also have the same density, Ilmarë would then have approximately 8.4% the system mass of (2.664±0.064)×10^{20} kg. If, however, the albedo of Varda is 50% greater than that of Ilmarë, Ilmarë would have a radius of 191+22
−21 km and the bulk density of the system would be 1.31+0.52
−0.36 g/cm^{3}. If Ilmarë has a 50%-greater albedo, then its radius would be 137+16
−15 km and the bulk density would be 1.18+0.47
−0.33 g/cm^{3}. Because the absolute magnitudes of the two bodies at different wavelengths are similar, it is not likely that their albedos differ by much, so Ilmarë is likely to be in this size range.

=== Newer estimates for Ilmarë's physical characteristics ===
==== Size and albedo ====
However, more accurate measurements in 2025 that was done by Kiss et al., measured a low albedo of 0.068±0.011 for Ilmarë, which is a bit lower than the albedo of Varda (0.099±0.002), yielding a larger diameter of 403±40 km, which is about half that of its primary.

Assuming that the following size estimates are correct, Ilmarë is about the fourth-biggest known moon of a trans-Neptunian object, after Charon (1212±1 km), Dysnomia (615+60
−50 km), and Vanth (442.5±10.2 km).

==== Mass and density ====
Under the assumption that both bodies have equal densities (1.15 g/cm^{3}), the resulting satellite-to-primary mass ratio is 0.16:1, closely matching that of the Orcus–Vanth system. Even under the assumption of a lower density of 0.7 g/cm^{3}, which is thought to be more typical that of trans-Neptunian objects in the ~400 km size range, the mass ratio remains high at 0.11:1. This places Varda–Ilmarë among the systems with the largest known mass ratios, comparable to that of Pluto–Charon.

==== Surface and spectrum ====
The surface of Ilmare's color is dark and moderately reddish, with a low geometric albedo of 0.068±0.011, which is a bit lower than that of Varda, and has a measured B−V color index of 0.857±0.061 and a V−I color index of 1.266±0.052, which is considered a moderately red color.

== See also ==
- Actaea – a moon of another large trans-Neptunian object, 120347 Salacia, that is similar in size to Ilmarë
- Hiʻiaka, a similarly sized moon orbiting the dwarf planet Haumea
