= Denise Stephens =

American astronomer

Denise C. Nuttall Stephens
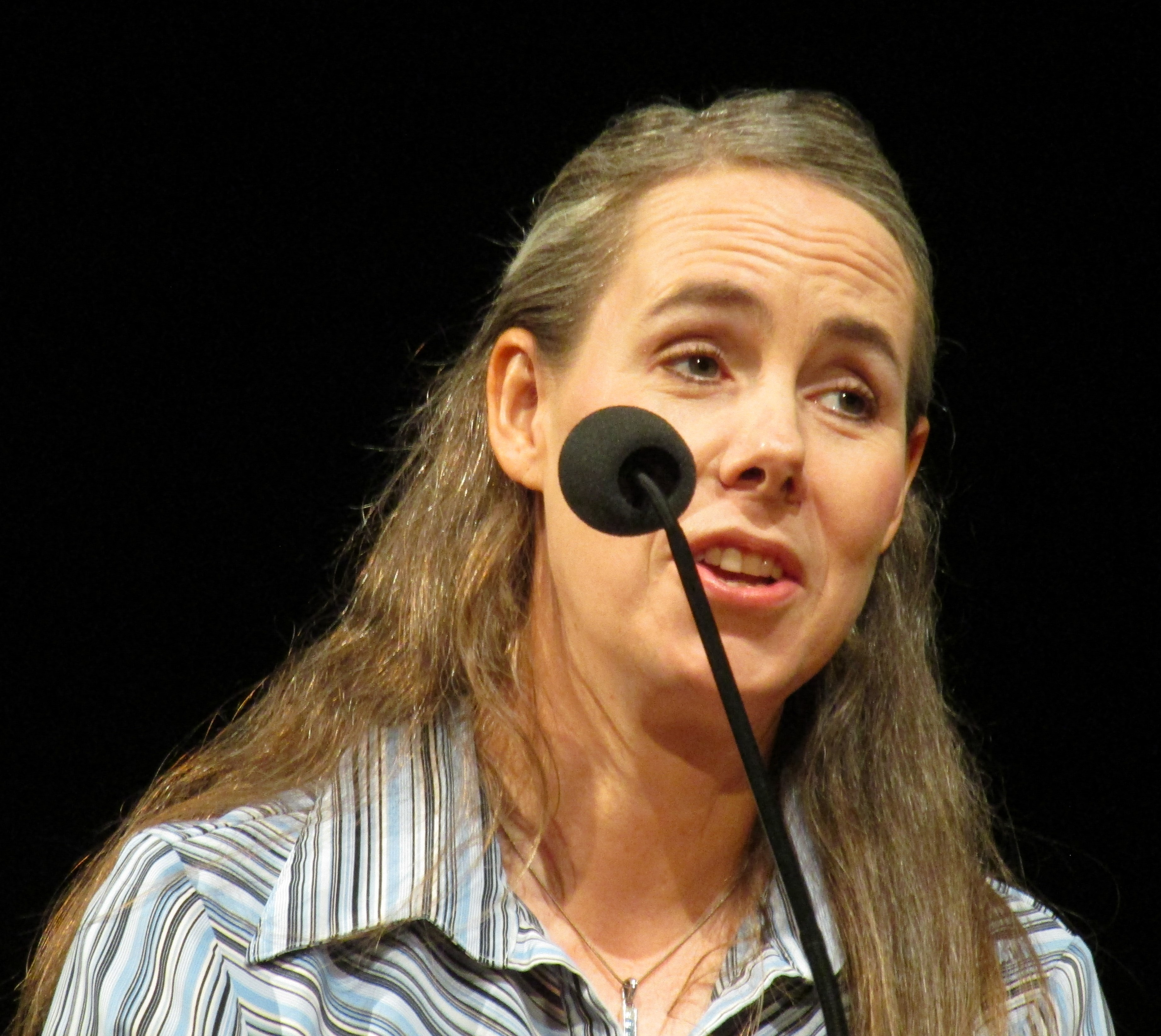
- Born: 1973 or 1974 (age 51–52)
- Occupation: associate professor
- Children: 7

Academic background
- Education: Brigham Young University (BS); New Mexico State University (PhD)

Academic work
- Discipline: Astronomy
- Main interests: Brown dwarfs

Denise C. Nuttall Stephens (born 1973 or 1974) is an associate professor of astronomy in the College of Physical and Mathematical Sciences in the Department of Physics and Astronomy at Brigham Young University.

== Education and research experience ==
Stephens graduated from Brigham Young University in 1996 as an undergraduate student with a degree in physics. She received her Master's and Ph.D. in Astronomy from New Mexico State University. She completed her a postgraduate program at the Space Telescope Science Institute and at Johns Hopkins University. She joined the faculty of BYU in 2007. She studies the atmosphere of brown dwarfs, looks for and classifies binary systems, studies TNOs, and uses telescopes both on ground and in space to collect infrared data.

In 2017, she and a team of undergraduates at BYU published their discovery of a new planet called KELT-16b, which was made as part of the KELT project. Her team also co-discovered the hottest known exoplanet KELT-9b the same year.

== Community involvement ==
Stephens is a coordinator of the BYU Astronomical Society. She also runs an annual public event called Astrofest which introduces physics and astronomy to children. She is the team captain of an on-campus flag football team, which is the only women's intramural faculty team at BYU.

== Personal life ==
Denise Stephens is married and is a mother to seven children.
