= Vanth (moon) =

Moon of Orcus

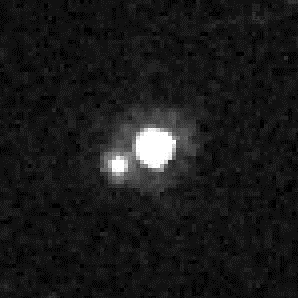
- Vanth (smaller object) and Orcus imaged by the Hubble Space Telescope

Discovery
- Discovered by: Michael E. Brown; Terry-Ann Suer
- Discovery date: 13 November 2005

Designations
- Designation: (90482) Orcus I
- Pronunciation: /ˈvænθ/
- Named after: Vanth
- Adjectives: Vanthian

Orbital characteristics
- Epoch 21.5 September 2006 (JD 2454000.0)
- Semi-major axis: 8999.8±9.1 km
- Eccentricity: 0.00091±0.00053
- Orbital period (sidereal): 9.539154±0.000020 d
- Inclination: 105.03°±0.18° (to celestial equator); 90.54°±0.17° (to ecliptic) (Note: Given Vanth's orbit pole ecliptic latitude of −0.54°±0.17°, subtracting this angle from the ecliptic north pole of +90° gives the inclination with respect to the ecliptic: i = +90° – (–0.54°) = +90.54°.)
- Longitude of ascending node: 53.49°±0.33°
- Argument of periapsis: 274.51° (Note: Grundy et al. (2019) only give the longitude of periapsis for Vanth's orbit, which is 328°±51°. The longitude of periapsis is the sum of the ascending node and argument of periapsis, so subtracting Vanth's ascending node of 53.49°±0.33° from its longitude of periapsis gives 274.51° for its argument of periapsis.)
- Satellite of: Orcus

Physical characteristics
- Mean diameter: 442.5±10.2 km (occultation); 475±75 km (thermal)
- Mass: (8.7±0.8)×10^{19} kg
- Mean density: ≈1.9±0.3 g/cm^{3} (occultation) (Note: Brown and Butler (2023) did not calculate Vanth's density for its occultation-derived diameter of 442.5±10.2 km. Dividing Vanth's estimated mass of (8.7±0.8)×10^{19} kg by the spherical volume that would correspond to the occultation-derived diameter gives a density of 1.9±0.3 g/cm^{3}.); 1.5+1.0 −0.5 g/cm^{3} (thermal)
- Synodic rotation period: synchronous
- Albedo: 0.08±0.02
- Temperature: <44 K
- Spectral type: moderately red V–I = 1.03±0.05
- Apparent magnitude: 21.8
- Absolute magnitude (H): 4.88±0.05

Vanth (formal designation (90482) Orcus I) is the only known moon of the large trans-Neptunian dwarf planet Orcus. It was discovered by Michael Brown and Terry-Ann Suer using images taken by the Hubble Space Telescope on 13 November 2005. The moon has a diameter of 443 km (275 mi), making it about half the size of Orcus and the third-largest moon of a trans-Neptunian object.

Vanth is massive enough that it shifts the barycenter of the Orcus–Vanth system outside of Orcus, forming a binary system in which the two bodies revolve around the barycenter, much like the Pluto–Charon system. It is hypothesized that both systems formed similarly, most likely by a giant impact early in the Solar System's history. Compared to Orcus, Vanth has a darker and slightly redder surface that supposedly lacks exposed water ice, resembling primordial Kuiper belt objects.

== Discovery ==
Vanth was discovered in Hubble Space Telescope images taken on 13 November 2005, during Michael Brown's survey for satellites around large trans-Neptunian objects (TNOs) using Hubble's high-resolution Advanced Camera for Surveys. After Brown's Hubble survey concluded in late 2006, he and his colleague Terry-Ann Suer reported their newly discovered TNO satellites to the Central Bureau for Astronomical Telegrams, which announced their discovery of Vanth alongside three other TNO satellites on 22 February 2007. Brown continued observing the Orcus–Vanth system with Hubble in October–December 2006 and November–December 2007 to better determine the moon's orbit.

== Name ==
Before Vanth was named, it did not have a provisional designation. (Note: In his blog posts, Michael Brown wrote Vanth's provisional designation as S/1 90482 (2005), which is a not a standard way of writing satellite provisional designations.) On 23 March 2009, Brown asked readers of his blog to suggest possible names for the satellite, with the best one to be submitted to the International Astronomical Union (IAU) on 5 April. The name Vanth, the winged Etruscan psychopomp who guides the souls of the dead to the underworld, was first suggested by Sonya Taaffe—a fiction writer—and became the most popular name among the large pool of suggestions.

Vanth and Persipnei were among the few names that both matched the Etruscan origin and chthonic theme of Orcus's name, though Brown ultimately chose Vanth because its relationship to Orcus in Etruscan mythology strongly parallels the relationship between Pluto and Charon in Greek mythology. In Etruscan iconography, Vanth is frequently portrayed in the company of Charun (the Etruscan counterpart of the Greek Charon), which alludes to the similar properties of the Pluto and Orcus systems (the latter being nicknamed the "anti-Pluto" because the orbital resonance with Neptune keeps it on the opposite side of the Sun from Pluto). Brown quoted Taaffe as saying that if Vanth "accompanies dead souls from the moment of death to the underworld itself, then of course her face is turned always toward Orcus", a reference to the likely synchronous orbit of Vanth about Orcus.

The submission for Vanth's name was assessed and approved by the IAU's Committee for Small Body Nomenclature, (Note: The IAU's Committee for Small Body Nomenclature is now known as the Working Group Small Body Nomenclature.) in agreement with the naming procedures for minor planets and satellites. The official naming citation was announced by the Minor Planet Center in a notice published on 30 March 2010.

== Observability ==
=== Visual ===
From Earth, Vanth appears very close to Orcus with an angular separation of up to 0.25 arcseconds. For this reason, Vanth can only be visually resolved in high-resolution imaging, which requires the use of large-aperture space telescopes or ground-based telescopes aided by adaptive optics or interferometry. In visible light, Vanth's apparent magnitude is about 22, which is 2.61 magnitudes fainter than Orcus or about 9% of Orcus's brightness. Orcus and Vanth will gradually brighten as the system draws closer to the Sun until perihelion in 2142.

=== Occultations ===
Stellar occultations are a useful way of directly measuring an object's position, size, and shape, and can be predicted when the object's orbital trajectory is well-known. The first successful detection of a stellar occultation by Vanth was made by a single observatory in Hokkaido, Japan on 1 March 2014, which detected the occultation lasting 3 seconds. Because this was only a single detection of the occulted star's chord across Vanth, the occultation did not provide a meaningful constraint on Vanth's diameter and shape. On 7 March 2017, another stellar occultation by Vanth was observed in the Americas and the Pacific Ocean. Of the five observatories that participated in observing the 2017 occultation by Vanth, two of them made positive detections. The remaining observatories that did not detect the occultation, alongside the fact that the occulted star was a double star, tightly constrained the range of Vanth's possible diameters to 432–453 km (268–281 mi), with the assumption that Vanth had a spherical shape. The 2017 occultation showed no signs of an atmosphere on Vanth, which places an upper bound pressure of 1–4 microbars for a potential atmosphere. The 2017 occultation also showed no signs of rings within 10,000 km (6,200 mi) from Vanth or beyond 8,010 km (4,980 mi) from Orcus.

== Orbit ==
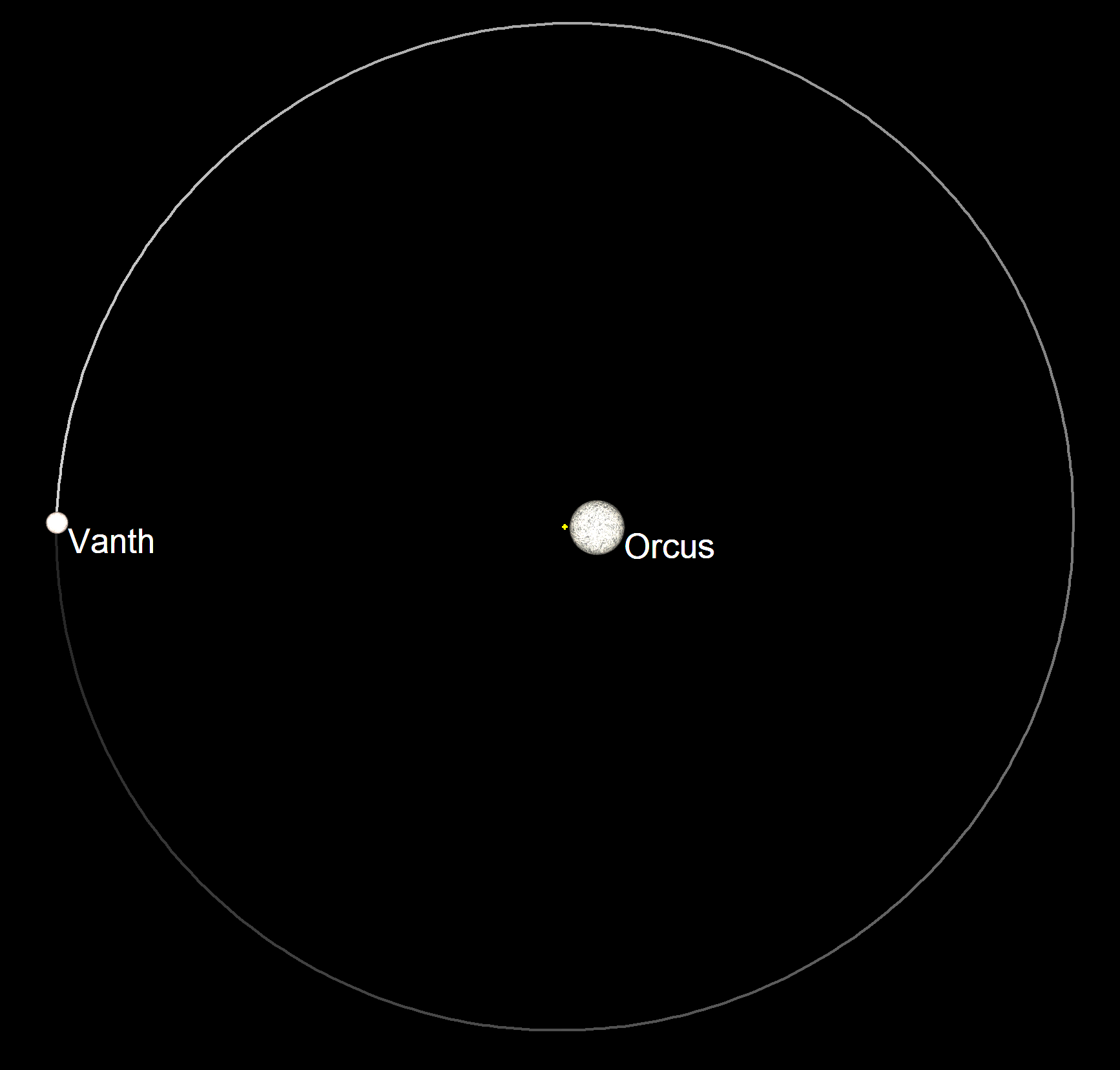
Diagram of Vanth's orbit as viewed face-on from Earth. Vanth appears to revolve counterclockwise because its orbital north pole is pointed toward Earth's line of sight.

Timelapse of Vanth orbiting Orcus, as seen by the Hubble Space Telescope during 2005–2006

Vanth forms a binary system with Orcus, in which the two bodies revolve around the barycenter between them. Orcus and Vanth are 9,000 km (5,600 mi) from each other's centers and revolve around their barycenter in nearly circular orbits with a period of 9.54 days. Vanth is less massive than Orcus, so it is the secondary component of the binary system and it orbits farther out from the barycenter at an orbital radius of 7,770 km (4,830 mi; 86.3% of the Orcus–Vanth separation distance). The more massive primary component, Orcus, orbits closer to the barycenter at an orbital radius of 1,230 km (760 mi; 13.7% of the separation distance). (Note: In a two-body binary system, the ratio of the primary body's (Orcus) orbital radius (r_{1}) from the barycenter to the system's separation distance (a) is equivalent to the ratio of the secondary's (Vanth) mass (m_{2}) to the system's total mass (m_{1} + m_{2}): $\frac{r_1}{a} = \frac{m_2}{m_1 + m_2}$)

Vanth's orbit is inclined perpendicularly (90°) with respect to the plane of the Solar System. During the time Vanth was observed (2005–2023), the north pole of its orbit was pointed towards Earth such that Vanth's orbit appeared face-on or pole-on from Earth's perspective. The perspective of Vanth's orbital plane shifts very slowly as the Orcus–Vanth system travels along its 247-year orbit around the Sun. Because of this slow shift in perspective, astronomers were not able determine Vanth's actual orbital inclination until 2015. Vanth's orbit will eventually shift from a face-on to an edge-on perspective by the year 2082, after which the Orcus–Vanth system begins its season of mutual events where Orcus and Vanth take turns eclipsing and transiting each other.

== Physical characteristics ==
=== Size, mass, and density ===
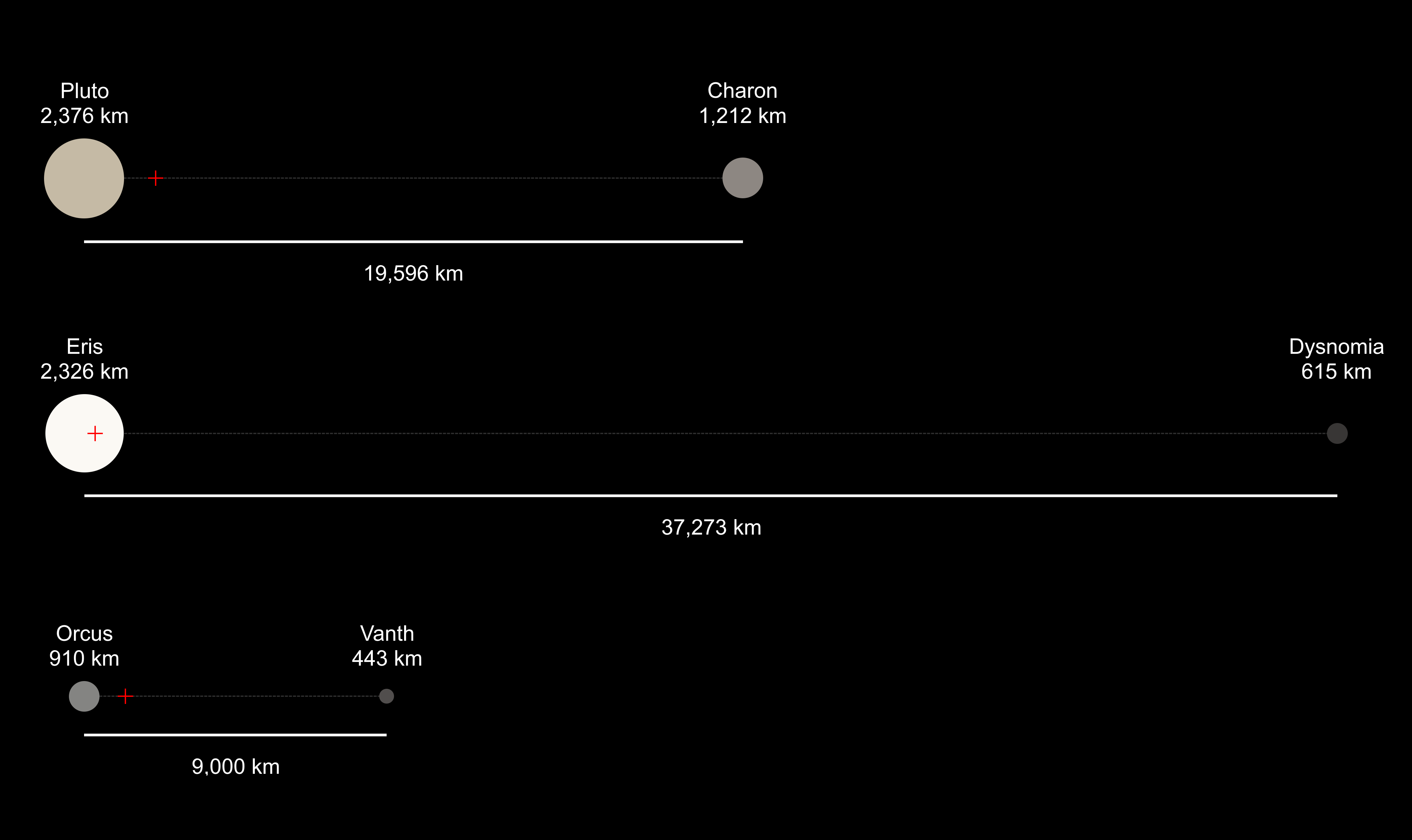
Diagram of the three largest binary trans-Neptunian dwarf planets and their satellites with true colors, diameters, and distances to scale. Each system's barycenter position marked is in red crosshairs.

As of 2023, the most accurate estimate for Vanth's diameter is 443 ± 10 km (275 ± 6 mi), determined from a stellar occultation in 2017. This estimate is consistent with the previous estimate of 475 ± 75 km (295 ± 47 mi) from thermal emission measurements by the Atacama Large Millimeter Array (ALMA) in 2016. Both estimates show that Vanth is roughly half of Orcus's diameter and is the third-largest known moon of a trans-Neptunian object, after Charon and Dysnomia.

Vanth is massive enough that it gravitationally forces Orcus into orbit around the system's barycenter. High-resolution imaging by ALMA resolved Orcus's barycentric orbital motion in 2016, which showed that the barycenter lay 13.7%±1.3% along the separation distance from Orcus to Vanth. This indicates Vanth has a mass of (8.7±0.8)×10^{19} kg. Of all known planet and dwarf planet satellite systems, Vanth is the most massive satellite relative to its primary: the ratio of Vanth's mass to Orcus's mass is 16%±2%, which is greater than the Pluto–Charon binary's mass ratio of 12%.

Vanth appears to have a similar density as Orcus, despite there being large uncertainties in current estimates for Vanth's density. According to ALMA measurements for Vanth's diameter and mass, Vanth's density is 1.5+0.5
−1.0 g/cm^{3}. Using the occultation estimate for Vanth's diameter instead of ALMA yields a higher density of 1.9±0.3 g/cm^{3}. If Vanth's density is indeed similar to Orcus's, this would support an impact origin for the system. Nevertheless, additional observations of the Orcus–Vanth system are needed to refine Vanth's mass and density before any conclusions could be made about Vanth's origin and interior structure.

=== Surface ===
Visible and near-infrared Hubble observations of Vanth from 2007 to 2008 showed that the moon's surface appears moderately red, being increasingly more reflective over longer and redder wavelengths. Vanth's surface is expected to be devoid of volatile ices such as ammonia and methane, since Vanth is too small for its gravity to prevent gases from escaping into space. Near-infrared spectroscopy by the Very Large Telescope in 2010 confirmed Vanth's reddish color but did not conclusively detect signs of water ice in Vanth's spectrum due to the low resolution of the observations. Nevertheless, Vanth's reddish spectrum appears consistent with a low water ice abundance on its surface, which suggests that its surface composition may be similar to those of tholin-covered Kuiper belt objects. Vanth's reddish color and apparent lack of exposed water ice hinted that it should have a dark surface with a geometric albedo lower than that of Orcus; this was confirmed in ALMA observations from 2016, which determined a geometric albedo of 0.08 for Vanth based on its thermal emission.

=== Light curve, rotation, and shape ===
Due to the pole-on perspective of the Orcus–Vanth system from Earth, a large portion of the components' surfaces stay in view as they rotate, resulting in minuscule changes in brightness that make it difficult for astronomers to study the system's light curve. In addition, Orcus and Vanth orbit so close to each other that most telescopes on Earth cannot resolve them individually, so the light curves from each component are combined as a single light curve. Continuous photometric observations of the unresolved Orcus–Vanth system in 2009–2010 showed that its overall brightness varies with a small light curve amplitude of 0.06±0.04 magnitudes and a period of 9.7±0.3 days. This roughly coincides with Vanth's 9.54-day orbital period, which indicates there is synchronous rotation in one or both of the system's components. At least one of these synchronously rotating components must have either an elongated shape or surface albedo variations to cause these brightness variations. Researchers José Luis Ortiz et al. suggested in 2011 that at least Vanth must be synchronously rotating according to the Orcus–Vanth system's light curve, whereas David Rabinowitz and Yasi Owainati argued in 2014 that the system's variability should most likely come from both components, meaning the Orcus–Vanth system should be doubly synchronous.

No individually-resolved light curve for Vanth has been measured yet, so its shape is unknown. Vanth's diameter lies close to the 450 km (280 mi) threshold for hydrostatic equilibrium in trans-Neptunian objects, so Vanth might not be massive enough to gravitationally compress itself into a sphere, especially in the cold temperatures of the Kuiper belt (below 44 K; −229 °C) where ice and rock are more rigid.

== Origin ==
The circular orbits and relative component sizes of the Orcus–Vanth system bear similarities to the Pluto–Charon binary system, which led astronomers to suspect that these two systems formed and evolved similarly. As hypothesized for Charon, Vanth is believed to be a captured fragment of a large body that impacted Orcus likely before the outward migration of Neptune 700 million years after the formation of the Solar System (about 4 billion years ago). Hydrodynamic simulations by researchers Sota Arakawa et al. in 2019 suggested that an impactor traveling close to Orcus's escape velocity should impact Orcus at an oblique angle greater than 45° for it to leave a large, intact fragment in orbit around Orcus. This fragment, which would become Vanth, would initially have an eccentric orbit close to Orcus. Arakawa et al.'s simulations predicted that both Orcus and Vanth should remain molten for at least 10,000 years for tidal interactions to tidally lock both components and expand and circularize Vanth's orbit before the present day. Earlier calculations by Michael Brown et al. in 2010 suggested that it took 150–400 million years for both components of the Orcus–Vanth system to migrate out to their current separation distance and become tidally locked.

An impact origin of the Orcus and Vanth system would imply that both components should have similar densities, surface compositions, and colors. While Vanth does have a similar density to Orcus (albeit with large uncertainty), Vanth appears redder and tentative spectroscopic studies have suggested that it has low amounts of exposed water ice, which may make it resemble primordial Kuiper belt objects more than Orcus, whose surface has a neutral (gray) color and is abundant in exposed water ice by contrast. While the uncertain nature of Orcus and Vanth's compositional difference does not necessarily refute the impact hypothesis, it does lend plausibility to alternative hypotheses for Vanth's origin, such as the gravitational capture of a Kuiper belt object. However, these alternative hypotheses have since fallen out of favor as Vanth's physical properties and formation mechanisms of dwarf planet satellites became better understood.

== See also ==
- Actaea – a large moon orbiting the large Kuiper belt object 120347 Salacia
- Ilmarë – a large moon orbiting the large Kuiper belt object 174567 Varda
