= Tug of war (astronomy) =

Ratio of gravitational forces on a satellite from the Sun and host planet

The tug of war in astronomy is the ratio of planetary and solar attractions on a natural satellite. The term was coined by Isaac Asimov in The Magazine of Fantasy and Science Fiction in 1963.

== Law of universal gravitation ==
According to Isaac Newton's law of universal gravitation

$$F= G\cdot \frac{m_1 \cdot m_2} {d^2}$$

In this equation

F is the force of attraction
G is the gravitational constant
m_{1} and m_{2} are the masses of two bodies
d is the distance between the two bodies

The two main attraction forces on a satellite are the attraction of the Sun and the satellite's primary (the planet the satellite orbits). Therefore, the two forces are

$$F_p= \frac{G \cdot m \cdot M_p} {d_p^2}$$
$$F_s= \frac{G \cdot m \cdot M_s} {d_s^2}$$

where the subscripts p and s represent the primary and the Sun respectively, and m is the mass of the satellite.

The ratio of the two is

$$\frac{F_p}{F_s} = \frac{M_p \cdot d_s^2}{M_s \cdot d_p^2}$$

== Example ==
Callisto is a satellite of Jupiter. The parameters in the equation are

- Callisto–Jupiter distance (d_{p}) is 1.883 · 10^{6} km.
- Mass of Jupiter (M_{p}) is 1.9 · 10^{27} kg
- Jupiter–Sun distance (i.e. mean distance of Callisto from the Sun, d_{s}) is 778.3 · 10^{6} km.
- The solar mass (M_{s}) is 1.989 · 10^{30} kg

$$\frac{F_p}{F_s} = \frac{1.9 \cdot 10^{27} \cdot (778.3)^2}{1.989 \cdot 10^{30} \cdot(1.883)^2} \approx 163$$

The ratio 163 shows that the solar attraction is much weaker than the planetary attraction.

== The table of planets ==
Asimov lists tug-of-war ratio for 32 satellites (then known in 1963) of the Solar System. The list below shows one example from each planet.

Primary	Satellite	Tug-of-war ratio
Neptune	Triton	8400
Uranus	Titania	1750
Saturn	Titan	380
Jupiter	Ganymede	490
Mars	Phobos	195
Earth	Moon	0.46

== The special case of the Moon ==
Unlike other satellites of the Solar System, the solar attraction on the Moon is more than that of its primary. According to Asimov, the Moon is a planet moving around the Sun in careful step with the Earth.
