= List of minor planets: 416001–417000 =

The following is a partial list of minor planets, running from minor-planet number 416001 through 417000, inclusive. The primary data for this and other partial lists is based on JPL's "Small-Body Orbital Elements" and data available from the Minor Planet Center. Critical list information is also provided by the MPC, unless otherwise specified from Lowell Observatory. A detailed description of the table's columns and additional sources are given on the main page including a complete list of every page in this series, and a statistical break-up on the dynamical classification of minor planets.

Also see the summary list of all named bodies in numerical and alphabetical order, and the corresponding naming citations for the number range of this particular list. New namings may only be added to this list after official publication, as the preannouncement of names is condemned by the Working Group for Small Bodies Nomenclature of the International Astronomical Union.

Near-Earth obj.	MBA (inner)	MBA (outer)	Centaur
Mars-crosser	MBA (middle)	Jupiter trojan	Trans-Neptunian obj.
Unclassified

== 416001–416100 ==
Designation			Discovery			Properties		Ref
Permanent	Provisional	Named after	Date	Site	Discoverer(s)	Category	Diam.	Ref
416001	2002 AO_{188}	—	January 10, 2002	Palomar	NEAT	H	790 m	MPC · JPL
416002	2002 BN	—	January 19, 2002	Socorro	LINEAR	ATE	280 m	MPC · JPL
416003	2002 BA_{19}	—	January 21, 2002	Socorro	LINEAR	·	2.0 km	MPC · JPL
416004	2002 CJ_{12}	—	January 9, 2002	Socorro	LINEAR	H	650 m	MPC · JPL
416005	2002 CJ_{14}	—	February 7, 2002	Socorro	LINEAR	H	590 m	MPC · JPL
416006	2002 CT_{24}	—	February 6, 2002	Haleakala	NEAT	PHO	1.0 km	MPC · JPL
416007	2002 CJ_{29}	—	February 6, 2002	Socorro	LINEAR	EUN	1.7 km	MPC · JPL
416008	2002 CY_{29}	—	February 6, 2002	Socorro	LINEAR	·	1.8 km	MPC · JPL
416009	2002 CY_{43}	—	February 10, 2002	Socorro	LINEAR	H	540 m	MPC · JPL
416010	2002 CE_{44}	—	January 22, 2002	Socorro	LINEAR	H	540 m	MPC · JPL
416011	2002 CB_{67}	—	January 14, 2002	Socorro	LINEAR	·	550 m	MPC · JPL
416012	2002 CS_{67}	—	February 7, 2002	Socorro	LINEAR	·	1.5 km	MPC · JPL
416013	2002 CU_{67}	—	January 19, 2002	Kitt Peak	Spacewatch	·	1.9 km	MPC · JPL
416014	2002 CE_{91}	—	February 7, 2002	Socorro	LINEAR	·	2.0 km	MPC · JPL
416015	2002 CZ_{113}	—	February 8, 2002	Socorro	LINEAR	·	2.2 km	MPC · JPL
416016	2002 CW_{135}	—	February 8, 2002	Socorro	LINEAR	·	830 m	MPC · JPL
416017	2002 CA_{162}	—	January 9, 2002	Socorro	LINEAR	·	2.2 km	MPC · JPL
416018	2002 CO_{169}	—	February 8, 2002	Socorro	LINEAR	·	3.9 km	MPC · JPL
416019	2002 CH_{177}	—	February 10, 2002	Socorro	LINEAR	·	1.9 km	MPC · JPL
416020	2002 CX_{213}	—	February 5, 2002	Palomar	NEAT	·	2.5 km	MPC · JPL
416021	2002 CT_{217}	—	February 10, 2002	Socorro	LINEAR	·	1.9 km	MPC · JPL
416022	2002 CB_{222}	—	January 13, 2002	Socorro	LINEAR	·	740 m	MPC · JPL
416023	2002 CO_{256}	—	January 22, 2002	Palomar	NEAT	·	1.6 km	MPC · JPL
416024	2002 CR_{272}	—	February 8, 2002	Anderson Mesa	LONEOS	·	2.0 km	MPC · JPL
416025	2002 CK_{276}	—	January 8, 2002	Haleakala	NEAT	·	2.1 km	MPC · JPL
416026	2002 CA_{303}	—	February 12, 2002	Socorro	LINEAR	JUN	970 m	MPC · JPL
416027	2002 DY	—	February 16, 2002	Bohyunsan	Jeon, Y.-B., Lee, B.-C.	EUN	1.2 km	MPC · JPL
416028	2002 DC_{2}	—	February 19, 2002	Socorro	LINEAR	H	540 m	MPC · JPL
416029	2002 DU_{5}	—	February 17, 2002	Kitt Peak	Spacewatch	H	500 m	MPC · JPL
416030	2002 EF_{6}	—	March 12, 2002	Palomar	NEAT	·	4.2 km	MPC · JPL
416031	2002 EX_{10}	—	March 15, 2002	Socorro	LINEAR	·	1.7 km	MPC · JPL
416032	2002 EX_{11}	—	March 15, 2002	Socorro	LINEAR	AMO	240 m	MPC · JPL
416033	2002 EE_{17}	—	February 14, 2002	Kitt Peak	Spacewatch	·	1.5 km	MPC · JPL
416034	2002 EA_{27}	—	February 13, 2002	Kitt Peak	Spacewatch	·	1.9 km	MPC · JPL
416035	2002 EK_{64}	—	March 13, 2002	Socorro	LINEAR	EUN	1.8 km	MPC · JPL
416036	2002 EO_{84}	—	February 20, 2002	Kitt Peak	Spacewatch	·	680 m	MPC · JPL
416037	2002 ES_{92}	—	March 14, 2002	Socorro	LINEAR	·	2.5 km	MPC · JPL
416038	2002 ED_{102}	—	March 6, 2002	Socorro	LINEAR	·	2.2 km	MPC · JPL
416039	2002 EX_{103}	—	March 9, 2002	Anderson Mesa	LONEOS	·	1.8 km	MPC · JPL
416040	2002 ER_{137}	—	March 12, 2002	Palomar	NEAT	·	1.6 km	MPC · JPL
416041	2002 EZ_{162}	—	March 13, 2002	Palomar	NEAT	·	1.9 km	MPC · JPL
416042	2002 ED_{164}	—	February 26, 2007	Mount Lemmon	Mount Lemmon Survey	·	2.6 km	MPC · JPL
416043	2002 FT_{3}	—	March 20, 2002	Desert Eagle	W. K. Y. Yeung	(32418)	2.7 km	MPC · JPL
416044	2002 FK_{40}	—	April 10, 2002	Kitt Peak	M. W. Buie, L. H. Wasserman	·	1.5 km	MPC · JPL
416045	2002 GW_{2}	—	February 21, 2002	Palomar	NEAT	·	2.1 km	MPC · JPL
416046	2002 GW_{22}	—	April 14, 2002	Haleakala	NEAT	·	3.7 km	MPC · JPL
416047	2002 GF_{27}	—	April 4, 2002	Socorro	LINEAR	H	660 m	MPC · JPL
416048	2002 GR_{29}	—	April 7, 2002	Cerro Tololo	M. W. Buie	·	1.8 km	MPC · JPL
416049	2002 GS_{29}	—	September 25, 1995	Kitt Peak	Spacewatch	·	1.7 km	MPC · JPL
416050	2002 GJ_{39}	—	April 4, 2002	Palomar	NEAT	·	910 m	MPC · JPL
416051	2002 GX_{56}	—	April 8, 2002	Palomar	NEAT	·	2.0 km	MPC · JPL
416052	2002 GP_{74}	—	April 9, 2002	Palomar	NEAT	·	950 m	MPC · JPL
416053	2002 GV_{97}	—	April 9, 2002	Kvistaberg	Uppsala-DLR Asteroid Survey	·	1.9 km	MPC · JPL
416054	2002 GB_{104}	—	April 10, 2002	Palomar	NEAT	·	4.6 km	MPC · JPL
416055	2002 GU_{106}	—	April 11, 2002	Anderson Mesa	LONEOS	·	1.6 km	MPC · JPL
416056	2002 GU_{116}	—	April 11, 2002	Socorro	LINEAR	·	1.1 km	MPC · JPL
416057	2002 GG_{158}	—	April 13, 2002	Palomar	NEAT	·	1.1 km	MPC · JPL
416058	2002 GK_{180}	—	April 5, 2002	Palomar	NEAT	·	2.0 km	MPC · JPL
416059	2002 GX_{185}	—	April 9, 2002	Palomar	NEAT	·	640 m	MPC · JPL
416060	2002 HW_{12}	—	April 21, 2002	Socorro	LINEAR	·	3.7 km	MPC · JPL
416061	2002 HW_{17}	—	April 20, 2002	Palomar	NEAT	·	2.5 km	MPC · JPL
416062	2002 HQ_{18}	—	April 22, 2002	Palomar	NEAT	V	730 m	MPC · JPL
416063	2002 JH_{14}	—	May 6, 2002	Socorro	LINEAR	·	2.1 km	MPC · JPL
416064	2002 JY_{107}	—	May 13, 2002	Palomar	NEAT	·	3.4 km	MPC · JPL
416065	2002 JM_{136}	—	May 9, 2002	Palomar	NEAT	·	900 m	MPC · JPL
416066	2002 JM_{150}	—	May 8, 2002	Haleakala	NEAT	·	2.2 km	MPC · JPL
416067	2002 KM_{16}	—	May 24, 2002	Palomar	NEAT	·	1.6 km	MPC · JPL
416068	2002 LH_{58}	—	June 15, 2002	Kitt Peak	Spacewatch	H	560 m	MPC · JPL
416069	2002 MZ_{4}	—	June 16, 2002	Palomar	NEAT	PHO	1.1 km	MPC · JPL
416070	2002 ME_{6}	—	June 20, 2002	La Palma	S. Collander-Brown, A. Fitzsimmons	·	3.5 km	MPC · JPL
416071	2002 NV	—	July 4, 2002	Palomar	NEAT	T_{j} (2.99) · AMO +1km	800 m	MPC · JPL
416072	2002 NT_{30}	—	July 7, 2002	Kitt Peak	Spacewatch	·	3.4 km	MPC · JPL
416073	2002 NX_{30}	—	July 8, 2002	Palomar	NEAT	TIR	2.8 km	MPC · JPL
416074	2002 NL_{39}	—	July 14, 2002	Socorro	LINEAR	PHO	1.4 km	MPC · JPL
416075	2002 NY_{62}	—	July 14, 2002	Palomar	NEAT	·	1.2 km	MPC · JPL
416076	2002 NC_{63}	—	July 9, 2002	Palomar	NEAT	·	1.1 km	MPC · JPL
416077	2002 NF_{63}	—	July 9, 2002	Palomar	NEAT	·	1.0 km	MPC · JPL
416078	2002 NA_{70}	—	July 10, 2002	Palomar	NEAT	·	3.6 km	MPC · JPL
416079	2002 NJ_{76}	—	September 10, 2010	Mount Lemmon	Mount Lemmon Survey	·	1.2 km	MPC · JPL
416080	2002 NQ_{76}	—	February 5, 2011	Catalina	CSS	·	3.5 km	MPC · JPL
416081	2002 NE_{77}	—	August 13, 2002	Palomar	NEAT	·	3.2 km	MPC · JPL
416082	2002 NR_{77}	—	July 9, 2002	Palomar	NEAT	·	2.2 km	MPC · JPL
416083	2002 NY_{77}	—	July 5, 2002	Palomar	NEAT	·	2.8 km	MPC · JPL
416084	2002 ND_{78}	—	October 3, 2008	Kitt Peak	Spacewatch	EOS	1.8 km	MPC · JPL
416085	2002 NU_{79}	—	September 28, 2008	Catalina	CSS	·	3.0 km	MPC · JPL
416086	2002 ND_{81}	—	October 23, 2003	Apache Point	SDSS	EOS	2.4 km	MPC · JPL
416087	2002 OQ_{18}	—	July 18, 2002	Socorro	LINEAR	·	1.6 km	MPC · JPL
416088	2002 OL_{24}	—	July 23, 2002	Palomar	NEAT	·	3.5 km	MPC · JPL
416089	2002 OO_{28}	—	July 16, 2002	Palomar	NEAT	·	4.0 km	MPC · JPL
416090	2002 OH_{29}	—	July 11, 2002	Campo Imperatore	CINEOS	·	3.4 km	MPC · JPL
416091	2002 OM_{33}	—	July 17, 2002	Palomar	NEAT	·	2.9 km	MPC · JPL
416092	2002 OH_{34}	—	July 22, 2002	Palomar	NEAT	PHO	780 m	MPC · JPL
416093	2002 OO_{34}	—	January 8, 2010	Kitt Peak	Spacewatch	EOS	2.1 km	MPC · JPL
416094	2002 PM_{3}	—	August 3, 2002	Palomar	NEAT	·	2.8 km	MPC · JPL
416095	2002 PZ_{8}	—	August 5, 2002	Palomar	NEAT	·	2.7 km	MPC · JPL
416096	2002 PS_{9}	—	July 22, 2002	Palomar	NEAT	·	2.5 km	MPC · JPL
416097	2002 PM_{12}	—	August 5, 2002	Palomar	NEAT	·	3.1 km	MPC · JPL
416098	2002 PZ_{12}	—	July 22, 2002	Palomar	NEAT	·	1.4 km	MPC · JPL
416099	2002 PQ_{23}	—	August 6, 2002	Palomar	NEAT	·	2.6 km	MPC · JPL
416100	2002 PN_{30}	—	August 6, 2002	Palomar	NEAT	·	1.1 km	MPC · JPL

== 416101–416200 ==
back to top

Designation			Discovery			Properties		Ref
Permanent	Provisional	Named after	Date	Site	Discoverer(s)	Category	Diam.	Ref
416101	2002 PO_{40}	—	August 8, 2002	Palomar	NEAT	·	3.8 km	MPC · JPL
416102	2002 PR_{40}	—	August 5, 2002	Palomar	NEAT	·	3.0 km	MPC · JPL
416103	2002 PY_{66}	—	August 6, 2002	Palomar	NEAT	·	920 m	MPC · JPL
416104	2002 PV_{111}	—	August 14, 2002	Socorro	LINEAR	·	5.7 km	MPC · JPL
416105	2002 PA_{112}	—	August 14, 2002	Pla D'Arguines	R. Ferrando	·	1.3 km	MPC · JPL
416106	2002 PJ_{114}	—	August 13, 2002	Kitt Peak	Spacewatch	·	1.9 km	MPC · JPL
416107	2002 PA_{162}	—	August 8, 2002	Palomar	S. F. Hönig	MAS	640 m	MPC · JPL
416108	2002 PY_{162}	—	August 8, 2002	Palomar	NEAT	·	2.8 km	MPC · JPL
416109	2002 PG_{168}	—	August 8, 2002	Palomar	NEAT	·	4.7 km	MPC · JPL
416110	2002 PJ_{173}	—	August 8, 2002	Palomar	NEAT	·	1.1 km	MPC · JPL
416111	2002 PW_{175}	—	August 7, 2002	Palomar	NEAT	EOS	2.2 km	MPC · JPL
416112	2002 PR_{177}	—	August 11, 2002	Palomar	NEAT	·	3.9 km	MPC · JPL
416113	2002 PJ_{191}	—	August 13, 2002	Palomar	NEAT	MAS	650 m	MPC · JPL
416114	2002 PZ_{191}	—	August 15, 2002	Palomar	NEAT	EOS	1.8 km	MPC · JPL
416115	2002 PF_{195}	—	September 19, 2006	Apache Point	SDSS	NYS	820 m	MPC · JPL
416116	2002 PG_{199}	—	August 8, 2002	Palomar	NEAT	·	1.2 km	MPC · JPL
416117	2002 QZ_{3}	—	August 16, 2002	Haleakala	NEAT	·	1.1 km	MPC · JPL
416118	2002 QQ_{31}	—	August 29, 2002	Palomar	NEAT	·	1.1 km	MPC · JPL
416119	2002 QS_{35}	—	August 29, 2002	Palomar	NEAT	THB	3.0 km	MPC · JPL
416120	2002 QO_{37}	—	August 30, 2002	Kitt Peak	Spacewatch	·	2.7 km	MPC · JPL
416121	2002 QS_{54}	—	August 17, 2002	Palomar	Lowe, A.	·	1.3 km	MPC · JPL
416122	2002 QM_{59}	—	August 19, 2002	Palomar	NEAT	·	2.7 km	MPC · JPL
416123	2002 QM_{69}	—	August 18, 2002	Palomar	NEAT	·	1.1 km	MPC · JPL
416124	2002 QZ_{71}	—	August 27, 2002	Palomar	NEAT	·	1.4 km	MPC · JPL
416125	2002 QC_{75}	—	August 19, 2002	Palomar	NEAT	·	1.1 km	MPC · JPL
416126	2002 QF_{89}	—	August 27, 2002	Palomar	NEAT	·	1.2 km	MPC · JPL
416127	2002 QC_{95}	—	August 28, 2002	Palomar	NEAT	LIX	3.5 km	MPC · JPL
416128	2002 QE_{95}	—	August 18, 2002	Palomar	NEAT	THM	1.9 km	MPC · JPL
416129	2002 QA_{99}	—	August 16, 2002	Palomar	NEAT	HYG	2.6 km	MPC · JPL
416130	2002 QF_{101}	—	August 30, 2002	Palomar	NEAT	·	1.0 km	MPC · JPL
416131	2002 QT_{103}	—	August 16, 2002	Palomar	NEAT	EOS	2.2 km	MPC · JPL
416132	2002 QS_{105}	—	August 29, 2002	Palomar	NEAT	NYS	1.1 km	MPC · JPL
416133	2002 QD_{106}	—	August 19, 2002	Palomar	NEAT	EMA	3.2 km	MPC · JPL
416134	2002 QK_{108}	—	August 17, 2002	Palomar	NEAT	·	3.0 km	MPC · JPL
416135	2002 QW_{114}	—	August 28, 2002	Palomar	NEAT	HYG	2.2 km	MPC · JPL
416136	2002 QN_{115}	—	August 18, 2002	Palomar	NEAT	·	3.0 km	MPC · JPL
416137	2002 QF_{117}	—	August 16, 2002	Palomar	NEAT	·	1.2 km	MPC · JPL
416138	2002 QK_{122}	—	August 26, 2002	Palomar	NEAT	·	2.8 km	MPC · JPL
416139	2002 QX_{122}	—	August 28, 2002	Palomar	NEAT	THB	3.1 km	MPC · JPL
416140	2002 QK_{123}	—	August 18, 2002	Palomar	NEAT	THM	2.2 km	MPC · JPL
416141	2002 QG_{126}	—	August 16, 2002	Palomar	NEAT	·	2.6 km	MPC · JPL
416142	2002 QR_{126}	—	August 30, 2002	Palomar	NEAT	·	3.1 km	MPC · JPL
416143	2002 QY_{130}	—	August 30, 2002	Palomar	NEAT	NYS	960 m	MPC · JPL
416144	2002 QO_{135}	—	August 30, 2002	Palomar	NEAT	·	3.4 km	MPC · JPL
416145	2002 QH_{142}	—	October 5, 2002	Apache Point	SDSS	V	630 m	MPC · JPL
416146	2002 QP_{146}	—	March 1, 2011	Mount Lemmon	Mount Lemmon Survey	·	2.7 km	MPC · JPL
416147	2002 QW_{147}	—	January 11, 2008	Kitt Peak	Spacewatch	·	1.1 km	MPC · JPL
416148	2002 QU_{150}	—	October 2, 2008	Mount Lemmon	Mount Lemmon Survey	HYG	2.9 km	MPC · JPL
416149	2002 QV_{154}	—	November 6, 2008	Mount Lemmon	Mount Lemmon Survey	·	2.7 km	MPC · JPL
416150	2002 RR_{23}	—	August 29, 2002	Palomar	NEAT	·	3.3 km	MPC · JPL
416151	2002 RQ_{25}	—	September 3, 2002	Campo Imperatore	CINEOS	APO	260 m	MPC · JPL
416152	2002 RX_{68}	—	September 4, 2002	Anderson Mesa	LONEOS	·	1.4 km	MPC · JPL
416153	2002 RB_{79}	—	September 5, 2002	Socorro	LINEAR	·	1.3 km	MPC · JPL
416154	2002 RY_{109}	—	September 6, 2002	Socorro	LINEAR	·	1.8 km	MPC · JPL
416155	2002 RZ_{118}	—	September 1, 2002	Palomar	NEAT	THB	2.5 km	MPC · JPL
416156	2002 RU_{131}	—	September 11, 2002	Palomar	NEAT	·	2.9 km	MPC · JPL
416157	2002 RK_{143}	—	September 11, 2002	Palomar	NEAT	·	1.2 km	MPC · JPL
416158	2002 RU_{175}	—	September 13, 2002	Palomar	NEAT	V	690 m	MPC · JPL
416159	2002 RM_{176}	—	September 13, 2002	Palomar	NEAT	·	1.2 km	MPC · JPL
416160	2002 RE_{195}	—	September 12, 2002	Palomar	NEAT	·	1.3 km	MPC · JPL
416161	2002 RZ_{217}	—	September 14, 2002	Palomar	NEAT	·	1.1 km	MPC · JPL
416162	2002 RL_{226}	—	September 14, 2002	Palomar	NEAT	LIX	3.4 km	MPC · JPL
416163	2002 RE_{228}	—	September 14, 2002	Haleakala	NEAT	·	1.2 km	MPC · JPL
416164	2002 RQ_{233}	—	September 14, 2002	Palomar	R. Matson	·	910 m	MPC · JPL
416165	2002 RF_{235}	—	September 14, 2002	Palomar	R. Matson	·	2.9 km	MPC · JPL
416166	2002 RO_{250}	—	September 8, 2002	Haleakala	NEAT	(43176)	3.3 km	MPC · JPL
416167	2002 RS_{252}	—	September 11, 2002	Palomar	NEAT	·	1.1 km	MPC · JPL
416168	2002 RS_{262}	—	September 13, 2002	Palomar	NEAT	·	4.0 km	MPC · JPL
416169	2002 RB_{263}	—	September 13, 2002	Palomar	NEAT	·	2.5 km	MPC · JPL
416170	2002 RQ_{264}	—	September 13, 2002	Palomar	NEAT	EOS	2.5 km	MPC · JPL
416171	2002 RP_{267}	—	September 3, 2002	Palomar	NEAT	EOS	2.5 km	MPC · JPL
416172	2002 RC_{276}	—	February 9, 2005	Mount Lemmon	Mount Lemmon Survey	·	2.4 km	MPC · JPL
416173	2002 RG_{286}	—	September 24, 2009	Mount Lemmon	Mount Lemmon Survey	·	4.3 km	MPC · JPL
416174	2002 SY_{5}	—	September 27, 2002	Palomar	NEAT	·	1.1 km	MPC · JPL
416175	2002 SS_{13}	—	September 27, 2002	Palomar	NEAT	·	4.6 km	MPC · JPL
416176	2002 SV_{13}	—	September 27, 2002	Palomar	NEAT	TIR	2.8 km	MPC · JPL
416177	2002 SZ_{13}	—	September 27, 2002	Palomar	NEAT	MAS	720 m	MPC · JPL
416178	2002 SM_{14}	—	September 27, 2002	Palomar	NEAT	·	1.2 km	MPC · JPL
416179	2002 SC_{15}	—	September 14, 2002	Anderson Mesa	LONEOS	·	4.0 km	MPC · JPL
416180	2002 SB_{54}	—	September 30, 2002	Palomar	NEAT	·	3.3 km	MPC · JPL
416181	2002 SA_{66}	—	September 16, 2002	Palomar	NEAT	EOS	2.0 km	MPC · JPL
416182	2002 SD_{67}	—	September 17, 2002	Palomar	NEAT	HYG	2.5 km	MPC · JPL
416183	2002 SB_{70}	—	September 26, 2002	Palomar	NEAT	LIX	2.2 km	MPC · JPL
416184	2002 SR_{72}	—	September 16, 2002	Palomar	NEAT	·	1.1 km	MPC · JPL
416185	2002 TW_{14}	—	August 14, 2002	Socorro	LINEAR	·	4.2 km	MPC · JPL
416186	2002 TD_{60}	—	October 5, 2002	Socorro	LINEAR	AMO	470 m	MPC · JPL
416187	2002 TP_{65}	—	October 5, 2002	Socorro	LINEAR	·	2.8 km	MPC · JPL
416188	2002 TR_{85}	—	October 2, 2002	Campo Imperatore	CINEOS	·	3.4 km	MPC · JPL
416189	2002 TT_{99}	—	October 4, 2002	Socorro	LINEAR	LIX	3.1 km	MPC · JPL
416190	2002 TF_{105}	—	October 4, 2002	Socorro	LINEAR	·	1.6 km	MPC · JPL
416191	2002 TK_{122}	—	October 4, 2002	Palomar	NEAT	·	2.8 km	MPC · JPL
416192	2002 TX_{131}	—	October 4, 2002	Socorro	LINEAR	·	1.2 km	MPC · JPL
416193	2002 TE_{135}	—	October 4, 2002	Palomar	NEAT	·	2.9 km	MPC · JPL
416194	2002 TX_{156}	—	October 5, 2002	Palomar	NEAT	·	1.1 km	MPC · JPL
416195	2002 TR_{190}	—	October 12, 2002	Socorro	LINEAR	APO · PHA	460 m	MPC · JPL
416196	2002 TV_{199}	—	October 7, 2002	Socorro	LINEAR	·	3.1 km	MPC · JPL
416197	2002 TY_{269}	—	October 4, 2002	Socorro	LINEAR	·	3.3 km	MPC · JPL
416198	2002 TR_{293}	—	October 11, 2002	Socorro	LINEAR	·	4.6 km	MPC · JPL
416199	2002 TH_{308}	—	October 15, 2002	Palomar	NEAT	·	3.9 km	MPC · JPL
416200	2002 TZ_{308}	—	October 4, 2002	Apache Point	SDSS	·	2.8 km	MPC · JPL

== 416201–416300 ==
back to top

Designation			Discovery			Properties		Ref
Permanent	Provisional	Named after	Date	Site	Discoverer(s)	Category	Diam.	Ref
416201	2002 TY_{315}	—	October 4, 2002	Apache Point	SDSS	·	4.1 km	MPC · JPL
416202	2002 TE_{319}	—	September 14, 2002	Palomar	NEAT	·	2.8 km	MPC · JPL
416203	2002 TV_{326}	—	October 5, 2002	Apache Point	SDSS	·	2.7 km	MPC · JPL
416204	2002 TF_{327}	—	October 5, 2002	Apache Point	SDSS	·	950 m	MPC · JPL
416205	2002 TP_{331}	—	October 5, 2002	Apache Point	SDSS	THM	2.1 km	MPC · JPL
416206	2002 TC_{334}	—	October 5, 2002	Apache Point	SDSS	·	2.9 km	MPC · JPL
416207	2002 TZ_{349}	—	October 10, 2002	Apache Point	SDSS	·	2.6 km	MPC · JPL
416208	2002 TW_{355}	—	October 10, 2002	Apache Point	SDSS	·	930 m	MPC · JPL
416209	2002 TM_{375}	—	October 1, 2002	Socorro	LINEAR	·	1.2 km	MPC · JPL
416210	2002 UZ_{23}	—	October 28, 2002	Palomar	NEAT	·	3.1 km	MPC · JPL
416211	2002 UB_{31}	—	October 31, 2002	Socorro	LINEAR	·	2.2 km	MPC · JPL
416212	2002 UQ_{60}	—	October 29, 2002	Apache Point	SDSS	·	3.0 km	MPC · JPL
416213	2002 UQ_{61}	—	November 30, 2003	Kitt Peak	Spacewatch	VER	3.0 km	MPC · JPL
416214	2002 VR_{2}	—	November 1, 2002	Palomar	NEAT	·	1.4 km	MPC · JPL
416215	2002 VL_{61}	—	October 18, 2002	Palomar	NEAT	·	3.6 km	MPC · JPL
416216	2002 VM_{90}	—	November 11, 2002	Kitt Peak	Spacewatch	·	1.4 km	MPC · JPL
416217	2002 VD_{118}	—	November 14, 2002	Palomar	NEAT	AMO	270 m	MPC · JPL
416218	2002 WK_{24}	—	November 16, 2002	Palomar	NEAT	·	3.8 km	MPC · JPL
416219	2002 WQ_{26}	—	November 24, 2002	Palomar	NEAT	·	2.8 km	MPC · JPL
416220	2002 WW_{30}	—	November 24, 2002	Palomar	NEAT	·	1.3 km	MPC · JPL
416221	2002 WG_{31}	—	November 24, 2002	Palomar	NEAT	·	1.1 km	MPC · JPL
416222	2002 XR_{3}	—	October 12, 2002	Socorro	LINEAR	·	3.3 km	MPC · JPL
416223	2002 XJ_{69}	—	December 13, 2002	Kitt Peak	Spacewatch	·	810 m	MPC · JPL
416224	2002 XM_{90}	—	December 5, 2002	Socorro	LINEAR	AMO +1km	860 m	MPC · JPL
416225	2002 XZ_{118}	—	December 10, 2002	Palomar	NEAT	L5	9.8 km	MPC · JPL
416226	2002 YL_{34}	—	December 31, 2002	Socorro	LINEAR	·	1.7 km	MPC · JPL
416227	2003 AX_{7}	—	January 2, 2003	Socorro	LINEAR	·	2.4 km	MPC · JPL
416228	2003 AL_{20}	—	January 5, 2003	Socorro	LINEAR	T_{j} (2.99)	3.8 km	MPC · JPL
416229	2003 AM_{55}	—	January 5, 2003	Socorro	LINEAR	T_{j} (2.93) · CYB	3.3 km	MPC · JPL
416230	2003 AB_{69}	—	January 9, 2003	Socorro	LINEAR	·	1.4 km	MPC · JPL
416231	2003 AJ_{73}	—	January 11, 2003	Socorro	LINEAR	AMO	660 m	MPC · JPL
416232	2003 AK_{79}	—	January 11, 2003	Kitt Peak	Spacewatch	EUN	1.1 km	MPC · JPL
416233	2003 AG_{90}	—	January 5, 2003	Socorro	LINEAR	CYB	4.9 km	MPC · JPL
416234	2003 BW	—	January 24, 2003	Palomar	NEAT	·	1.7 km	MPC · JPL
416235	2003 BZ_{5}	—	January 27, 2003	Anderson Mesa	LONEOS	·	1.6 km	MPC · JPL
416236	2003 BS_{16}	—	January 26, 2003	Haleakala	NEAT	·	1.7 km	MPC · JPL
416237	2003 BS_{23}	—	January 25, 2003	Palomar	NEAT	·	2.1 km	MPC · JPL
416238	2003 BP_{24}	—	January 25, 2003	Palomar	NEAT	·	1.5 km	MPC · JPL
416239	2003 BK_{55}	—	January 27, 2003	Haleakala	NEAT	·	1.7 km	MPC · JPL
416240	2003 BQ_{63}	—	January 28, 2003	Palomar	NEAT	·	970 m	MPC · JPL
416241	2003 BP_{66}	—	January 30, 2003	Anderson Mesa	LONEOS	(5)	1.2 km	MPC · JPL
416242	2003 BZ_{66}	—	January 30, 2003	Haleakala	NEAT	(5)	1.4 km	MPC · JPL
416243	2003 BS_{81}	—	January 31, 2003	Socorro	LINEAR	·	1.7 km	MPC · JPL
416244	2003 BZ_{86}	—	January 26, 2003	Kitt Peak	Spacewatch	(5)	970 m	MPC · JPL
416245	2003 CT_{1}	—	January 5, 2003	Socorro	LINEAR	·	1.7 km	MPC · JPL
416246	2003 CL_{6}	—	February 1, 2003	Socorro	LINEAR	·	1.3 km	MPC · JPL
416247	2003 CD_{7}	—	February 1, 2003	Socorro	LINEAR	·	1.8 km	MPC · JPL
416248	2003 CD_{26}	—	February 9, 2003	Palomar	NEAT	·	1.8 km	MPC · JPL
416249	2003 DG_{4}	—	February 22, 2003	Kitt Peak	Spacewatch	·	1.9 km	MPC · JPL
416250	2003 DL_{22}	—	February 28, 2003	Haleakala	NEAT	·	1.9 km	MPC · JPL
416251	2003 EQ	—	March 5, 2003	Kleť	M. Tichý, Kočer, M.	·	1.6 km	MPC · JPL
416252 Manuelherrera	2003 ES	Manuelherrera	March 5, 2003	Sierra Nevada	J. L. Ortiz	·	2.0 km	MPC · JPL
416253	2003 EF_{23}	—	March 6, 2003	Socorro	LINEAR	·	2.3 km	MPC · JPL
416254	2003 EE_{35}	—	March 7, 2003	Socorro	LINEAR	·	1.4 km	MPC · JPL
416255	2003 EW_{35}	—	March 7, 2003	Anderson Mesa	LONEOS	·	2.0 km	MPC · JPL
416256	2003 EB_{42}	—	March 8, 2003	Kitt Peak	Spacewatch	·	2.3 km	MPC · JPL
416257	2003 EG_{46}	—	March 7, 2003	Anderson Mesa	LONEOS	RAF	1.1 km	MPC · JPL
416258	2003 ED_{48}	—	March 9, 2003	Anderson Mesa	LONEOS	·	2.9 km	MPC · JPL
416259	2003 EK_{62}	—	March 8, 2003	Anderson Mesa	LONEOS	·	2.2 km	MPC · JPL
416260	2003 FQ_{3}	—	March 23, 2003	Saint-Sulpice	B. Christophe	EUN	1.4 km	MPC · JPL
416261	2003 FD_{5}	—	March 27, 2003	Socorro	LINEAR	·	1.1 km	MPC · JPL
416262	2003 FG_{20}	—	March 23, 2003	Palomar	NEAT	·	2.0 km	MPC · JPL
416263	2003 FQ_{24}	—	March 24, 2003	Kitt Peak	Spacewatch	·	2.4 km	MPC · JPL
416264	2003 FF_{29}	—	March 11, 2003	Palomar	NEAT	·	1.9 km	MPC · JPL
416265	2003 FP_{52}	—	March 25, 2003	Palomar	NEAT	·	1.6 km	MPC · JPL
416266	2003 FV_{70}	—	March 26, 2003	Kitt Peak	Spacewatch	·	1.7 km	MPC · JPL
416267	2003 FN_{93}	—	March 29, 2003	Anderson Mesa	LONEOS	JUN	1.4 km	MPC · JPL
416268	2003 FR_{96}	—	March 30, 2003	Kitt Peak	Spacewatch	EUN	1.1 km	MPC · JPL
416269	2003 FJ_{108}	—	March 30, 2003	Socorro	LINEAR	·	1.3 km	MPC · JPL
416270	2003 FY_{119}	—	March 26, 2003	Anderson Mesa	LONEOS	·	830 m	MPC · JPL
416271	2003 FS_{131}	—	March 31, 2003	Kitt Peak	Spacewatch	·	2.1 km	MPC · JPL
416272	2003 GN_{3}	—	April 1, 2003	Socorro	LINEAR	·	1.3 km	MPC · JPL
416273 Glennsnyder	2003 GS_{28}	Glennsnyder	April 8, 2003	Wrightwood	J. W. Young	·	1.5 km	MPC · JPL
416274	2003 GA_{52}	—	March 26, 2003	Kitt Peak	Spacewatch	·	1.6 km	MPC · JPL
416275	2003 HK_{15}	—	April 26, 2003	Haleakala	NEAT	·	2.6 km	MPC · JPL
416276	2003 HU_{34}	—	April 9, 2003	Kitt Peak	Spacewatch	·	740 m	MPC · JPL
416277	2003 HR_{58}	—	April 26, 2003	Apache Point	SDSS	H	550 m	MPC · JPL
416278	2003 KG	—	May 20, 2003	Anderson Mesa	LONEOS	·	2.0 km	MPC · JPL
416279	2003 KW_{2}	—	May 23, 2003	Kitt Peak	Spacewatch	(5)	1.5 km	MPC · JPL
416280	2003 KA_{3}	—	May 22, 2003	Kitt Peak	Spacewatch	·	2.6 km	MPC · JPL
416281	2003 KZ_{27}	—	May 20, 2003	Anderson Mesa	LONEOS	·	830 m	MPC · JPL
416282	2003 KE_{31}	—	May 26, 2003	Kitt Peak	Spacewatch	·	760 m	MPC · JPL
416283	2003 MM	—	June 21, 2003	Socorro	LINEAR	APO	170 m	MPC · JPL
416284	2003 OP_{21}	—	July 8, 2003	Palomar	NEAT	·	800 m	MPC · JPL
416285	2003 OW_{25}	—	July 26, 2003	Palomar	NEAT	·	2.6 km	MPC · JPL
416286	2003 PR_{11}	—	August 9, 2003	Haleakala	NEAT	T_{j} (2.99)	1.6 km	MPC · JPL
416287	2003 QK_{34}	—	August 22, 2003	Palomar	NEAT	·	1.1 km	MPC · JPL
416288	2003 QP_{71}	—	August 25, 2003	Palomar	NEAT	·	2.7 km	MPC · JPL
416289	2003 QT_{71}	—	July 29, 2003	Socorro	LINEAR	H	770 m	MPC · JPL
416290	2003 QJ_{77}	—	August 24, 2003	Socorro	LINEAR	·	1.9 km	MPC · JPL
416291	2003 QZ_{86}	—	August 25, 2003	Socorro	LINEAR	·	2.8 km	MPC · JPL
416292	2003 QJ_{93}	—	July 8, 2003	Palomar	NEAT	V	660 m	MPC · JPL
416293	2003 QJ_{95}	—	August 30, 2003	Kitt Peak	Spacewatch	·	2.1 km	MPC · JPL
416294	2003 QK_{99}	—	August 31, 2003	Haleakala	NEAT	·	1.0 km	MPC · JPL
416295	2003 QD_{109}	—	July 25, 2003	Palomar	NEAT	·	1.3 km	MPC · JPL
416296	2003 RM_{1}	—	September 2, 2003	Haleakala	NEAT	·	810 m	MPC · JPL
416297	2003 RW_{2}	—	September 1, 2003	Socorro	LINEAR	·	770 m	MPC · JPL
416298	2003 RZ_{13}	—	September 15, 2003	Haleakala	NEAT	·	1.8 km	MPC · JPL
416299	2003 RW_{19}	—	September 15, 2003	Anderson Mesa	LONEOS	·	740 m	MPC · JPL
416300	2003 RS_{22}	—	September 15, 2003	Haleakala	NEAT	·	770 m	MPC · JPL

== 416301–416400 ==
back to top

Designation			Discovery			Properties		Ref
Permanent	Provisional	Named after	Date	Site	Discoverer(s)	Category	Diam.	Ref
416301	2003 RL_{26}	—	September 7, 2003	Socorro	LINEAR	·	1.4 km	MPC · JPL
416302	2003 SW_{4}	—	September 16, 2003	Kitt Peak	Spacewatch	·	1.1 km	MPC · JPL
416303	2003 SF_{5}	—	September 16, 2003	Kitt Peak	Spacewatch	·	1.1 km	MPC · JPL
416304	2003 SS_{8}	—	September 16, 2003	Kitt Peak	Spacewatch	·	640 m	MPC · JPL
416305	2003 SB_{13}	—	September 16, 2003	Kitt Peak	Spacewatch	·	700 m	MPC · JPL
416306	2003 SL_{28}	—	September 18, 2003	Palomar	NEAT	·	3.5 km	MPC · JPL
416307	2003 SA_{39}	—	September 16, 2003	Palomar	NEAT	·	1.1 km	MPC · JPL
416308	2003 SP_{41}	—	September 17, 2003	Palomar	NEAT	PHO	910 m	MPC · JPL
416309	2003 SV_{42}	—	September 16, 2003	Anderson Mesa	LONEOS	·	870 m	MPC · JPL
416310	2003 SP_{48}	—	September 18, 2003	Palomar	NEAT	·	2.6 km	MPC · JPL
416311	2003 SA_{51}	—	September 18, 2003	Palomar	NEAT	NYS	1.1 km	MPC · JPL
416312	2003 SX_{55}	—	September 16, 2003	Anderson Mesa	LONEOS	·	2.0 km	MPC · JPL
416313	2003 SM_{77}	—	September 19, 2003	Kitt Peak	Spacewatch	·	850 m	MPC · JPL
416314	2003 SR_{85}	—	September 16, 2003	Palomar	NEAT	·	3.8 km	MPC · JPL
416315	2003 SW_{85}	—	September 16, 2003	Kitt Peak	Spacewatch	·	1.8 km	MPC · JPL
416316	2003 SA_{90}	—	September 18, 2003	Palomar	NEAT	H	610 m	MPC · JPL
416317	2003 SH_{104}	—	September 20, 2003	Haleakala	NEAT	·	1.1 km	MPC · JPL
416318	2003 SK_{121}	—	September 17, 2003	Kitt Peak	Spacewatch	·	1.1 km	MPC · JPL
416319	2003 SX_{129}	—	September 21, 2003	Haleakala	NEAT	·	860 m	MPC · JPL
416320	2003 SS_{138}	—	September 20, 2003	Palomar	NEAT	·	2.9 km	MPC · JPL
416321	2003 SV_{150}	—	September 17, 2003	Socorro	LINEAR	·	980 m	MPC · JPL
416322	2003 SE_{153}	—	September 19, 2003	Anderson Mesa	LONEOS	·	2.0 km	MPC · JPL
416323	2003 SW_{161}	—	September 18, 2003	Kitt Peak	Spacewatch	·	820 m	MPC · JPL
416324	2003 SF_{165}	—	September 20, 2003	Anderson Mesa	LONEOS	·	1.2 km	MPC · JPL
416325	2003 SL_{176}	—	September 18, 2003	Palomar	NEAT	·	2.1 km	MPC · JPL
416326	2003 SY_{177}	—	September 19, 2003	Socorro	LINEAR	·	810 m	MPC · JPL
416327	2003 SM_{179}	—	September 19, 2003	Palomar	NEAT	·	1.9 km	MPC · JPL
416328	2003 SV_{183}	—	September 21, 2003	Kitt Peak	Spacewatch	·	880 m	MPC · JPL
416329	2003 SX_{192}	—	September 20, 2003	Palomar	NEAT	·	2.8 km	MPC · JPL
416330	2003 SM_{194}	—	September 20, 2003	Kitt Peak	Spacewatch	ERI	1.4 km	MPC · JPL
416331	2003 SV_{194}	—	September 20, 2003	Palomar	NEAT	·	960 m	MPC · JPL
416332	2003 SQ_{202}	—	September 22, 2003	Anderson Mesa	LONEOS	·	910 m	MPC · JPL
416333	2003 SV_{202}	—	September 22, 2003	Anderson Mesa	LONEOS	·	790 m	MPC · JPL
416334	2003 ST_{205}	—	September 25, 2003	Haleakala	NEAT	·	870 m	MPC · JPL
416335	2003 SG_{207}	—	September 26, 2003	Socorro	LINEAR	·	2.9 km	MPC · JPL
416336	2003 SG_{219}	—	September 27, 2003	Socorro	LINEAR	H	730 m	MPC · JPL
416337	2003 SM_{222}	—	September 28, 2003	Desert Eagle	W. K. Y. Yeung	EOS	2.2 km	MPC · JPL
416338	2003 SF_{244}	—	September 29, 2003	Kitt Peak	Spacewatch	·	1.9 km	MPC · JPL
416339	2003 SS_{258}	—	September 28, 2003	Kitt Peak	Spacewatch	·	2.1 km	MPC · JPL
416340	2003 SH_{280}	—	September 18, 2003	Socorro	LINEAR	·	1.2 km	MPC · JPL
416341	2003 SV_{281}	—	September 19, 2003	Kitt Peak	Spacewatch	·	730 m	MPC · JPL
416342	2003 SR_{289}	—	September 19, 2003	Palomar	NEAT	·	3.1 km	MPC · JPL
416343	2003 SZ_{293}	—	September 28, 2003	Socorro	LINEAR	·	3.1 km	MPC · JPL
416344	2003 SX_{295}	—	September 20, 2003	Palomar	NEAT	·	2.2 km	MPC · JPL
416345	2003 SD_{307}	—	September 26, 2003	Socorro	LINEAR	·	3.5 km	MPC · JPL
416346	2003 SQ_{323}	—	September 16, 2003	Kitt Peak	Spacewatch	·	790 m	MPC · JPL
416347	2003 SQ_{327}	—	September 19, 2003	Palomar	NEAT	PHO	870 m	MPC · JPL
416348	2003 SW_{328}	—	September 21, 2003	Kitt Peak	Spacewatch	·	1.1 km	MPC · JPL
416349	2003 SA_{329}	—	September 21, 2003	Kitt Peak	Spacewatch	·	770 m	MPC · JPL
416350	2003 SH_{331}	—	October 20, 2003	Kitt Peak	Spacewatch	EOS	1.6 km	MPC · JPL
416351	2003 SJ_{331}	—	October 16, 2003	Palomar	NEAT	·	1.2 km	MPC · JPL
416352	2003 SX_{332}	—	September 30, 2003	Socorro	LINEAR	·	4.2 km	MPC · JPL
416353	2003 SL_{333}	—	September 26, 2003	Apache Point	SDSS	·	890 m	MPC · JPL
416354	2003 SJ_{338}	—	September 18, 2003	Kitt Peak	Spacewatch	·	640 m	MPC · JPL
416355	2003 SZ_{338}	—	September 28, 2003	Anderson Mesa	LONEOS	·	3.0 km	MPC · JPL
416356	2003 SD_{339}	—	September 26, 2003	Apache Point	SDSS	·	2.2 km	MPC · JPL
416357	2003 ST_{339}	—	September 26, 2003	Apache Point	SDSS	·	2.5 km	MPC · JPL
416358	2003 SM_{344}	—	September 17, 2003	Kitt Peak	Spacewatch	·	730 m	MPC · JPL
416359	2003 SZ_{357}	—	September 20, 2003	Kitt Peak	Spacewatch	·	720 m	MPC · JPL
416360	2003 SR_{365}	—	September 17, 2003	Kitt Peak	Spacewatch	·	2.6 km	MPC · JPL
416361	2003 SV_{368}	—	September 26, 2003	Apache Point	SDSS	·	1.5 km	MPC · JPL
416362	2003 SM_{382}	—	October 18, 2003	Kitt Peak	Spacewatch	EOS	1.6 km	MPC · JPL
416363	2003 SS_{391}	—	September 26, 2003	Apache Point	SDSS	·	2.2 km	MPC · JPL
416364	2003 SR_{399}	—	September 26, 2003	Apache Point	SDSS	EOS	1.9 km	MPC · JPL
416365	2003 SL_{418}	—	September 27, 2003	Apache Point	SDSS	EOS	1.9 km	MPC · JPL
416366	2003 SR_{418}	—	September 28, 2003	Apache Point	SDSS	·	980 m	MPC · JPL
416367	2003 SG_{419}	—	September 28, 2003	Apache Point	SDSS	EOS	2.1 km	MPC · JPL
416368	2003 SS_{421}	—	September 18, 2003	Kitt Peak	Spacewatch	V	530 m	MPC · JPL
416369	2003 SS_{428}	—	September 18, 2003	Kitt Peak	Spacewatch	V	600 m	MPC · JPL
416370	2003 SE_{429}	—	September 20, 2003	Palomar	NEAT	·	2.4 km	MPC · JPL
416371	2003 SK_{430}	—	September 30, 2003	Kitt Peak	Spacewatch	V	570 m	MPC · JPL
416372	2003 TK_{5}	—	October 2, 2003	Haleakala	NEAT	·	2.6 km	MPC · JPL
416373	2003 TG_{18}	—	October 14, 2003	Palomar	NEAT	·	750 m	MPC · JPL
416374	2003 TC_{25}	—	October 1, 2003	Kitt Peak	Spacewatch	·	2.3 km	MPC · JPL
416375	2003 TS_{26}	—	September 20, 2003	Kitt Peak	Spacewatch	EOS	1.8 km	MPC · JPL
416376	2003 TT_{34}	—	October 1, 2003	Kitt Peak	Spacewatch	·	2.3 km	MPC · JPL
416377	2003 TB_{45}	—	October 3, 2003	Kitt Peak	Spacewatch	·	2.8 km	MPC · JPL
416378	2003 TG_{46}	—	October 3, 2003	Kitt Peak	Spacewatch	·	2.7 km	MPC · JPL
416379	2003 TU_{55}	—	October 5, 2003	Kitt Peak	Spacewatch	·	900 m	MPC · JPL
416380	2003 UA_{2}	—	October 16, 2003	Kitt Peak	Spacewatch	·	930 m	MPC · JPL
416381	2003 UR_{8}	—	October 16, 2003	Socorro	LINEAR	H	750 m	MPC · JPL
416382	2003 UU_{9}	—	October 20, 2003	Nashville	Clingan, R.	NYS	960 m	MPC · JPL
416383	2003 UH_{11}	—	September 21, 2003	Anderson Mesa	LONEOS	H	450 m	MPC · JPL
416384	2003 UA_{15}	—	October 16, 2003	Kitt Peak	Spacewatch	·	2.6 km	MPC · JPL
416385	2003 UN_{17}	—	October 18, 2003	Kitt Peak	Spacewatch	·	980 m	MPC · JPL
416386	2003 UW_{19}	—	October 21, 2003	Socorro	LINEAR	·	1.8 km	MPC · JPL
416387	2003 UL_{28}	—	October 19, 2003	Kitt Peak	Spacewatch	·	2.7 km	MPC · JPL
416388	2003 UY_{28}	—	October 22, 2003	Kitt Peak	Spacewatch	·	2.6 km	MPC · JPL
416389	2003 UR_{33}	—	October 17, 2003	Kitt Peak	Spacewatch	·	850 m	MPC · JPL
416390	2003 UD_{35}	—	October 16, 2003	Kitt Peak	Spacewatch	·	1.1 km	MPC · JPL
416391	2003 UG_{51}	—	October 18, 2003	Palomar	NEAT	·	3.8 km	MPC · JPL
416392	2003 UL_{51}	—	October 18, 2003	Palomar	NEAT	·	3.1 km	MPC · JPL
416393	2003 UT_{66}	—	October 16, 2003	Palomar	NEAT	·	940 m	MPC · JPL
416394	2003 UF_{67}	—	October 16, 2003	Kitt Peak	Spacewatch	EOS	1.2 km	MPC · JPL
416395	2003 UE_{90}	—	October 20, 2003	Kitt Peak	Spacewatch	V	500 m	MPC · JPL
416396	2003 UR_{97}	—	October 19, 2003	Kitt Peak	Spacewatch	MAS	620 m	MPC · JPL
416397	2003 UJ_{105}	—	October 18, 2003	Palomar	NEAT	·	3.8 km	MPC · JPL
416398	2003 UK_{114}	—	October 20, 2003	Kitt Peak	Spacewatch	NYS	910 m	MPC · JPL
416399	2003 UN_{117}	—	October 21, 2003	Kitt Peak	Spacewatch	·	860 m	MPC · JPL
416400	2003 UZ_{117}	—	October 24, 2003	Kitt Peak	Spacewatch	Haumea	222 km	MPC · JPL

== 416401–416500 ==
back to top

Designation			Discovery			Properties		Ref
Permanent	Provisional	Named after	Date	Site	Discoverer(s)	Category	Diam.	Ref
416401	2003 UP_{119}	—	October 1, 2003	Kitt Peak	Spacewatch	·	2.5 km	MPC · JPL
416402	2003 UF_{123}	—	October 19, 2003	Kitt Peak	Spacewatch	MAS	650 m	MPC · JPL
416403	2003 UO_{131}	—	October 19, 2003	Palomar	NEAT	·	870 m	MPC · JPL
416404	2003 US_{131}	—	October 19, 2003	Palomar	NEAT	·	930 m	MPC · JPL
416405	2003 UN_{136}	—	September 28, 2003	Socorro	LINEAR	·	970 m	MPC · JPL
416406	2003 UG_{139}	—	October 16, 2003	Palomar	NEAT	·	2.1 km	MPC · JPL
416407	2003 UP_{140}	—	October 16, 2003	Anderson Mesa	LONEOS	·	1.2 km	MPC · JPL
416408	2003 UM_{146}	—	October 21, 2003	Socorro	LINEAR	·	3.4 km	MPC · JPL
416409	2003 UJ_{154}	—	September 28, 2003	Socorro	LINEAR	·	3.0 km	MPC · JPL
416410	2003 UU_{170}	—	September 28, 2003	Kitt Peak	Spacewatch	·	1.4 km	MPC · JPL
416411	2003 UN_{175}	—	October 21, 2003	Anderson Mesa	LONEOS	·	830 m	MPC · JPL
416412	2003 US_{176}	—	October 21, 2003	Palomar	NEAT	·	1.1 km	MPC · JPL
416413	2003 UM_{179}	—	October 21, 2003	Socorro	LINEAR	·	960 m	MPC · JPL
416414	2003 UA_{181}	—	October 21, 2003	Socorro	LINEAR	·	4.0 km	MPC · JPL
416415	2003 UA_{184}	—	October 21, 2003	Palomar	NEAT	·	3.1 km	MPC · JPL
416416	2003 UG_{189}	—	October 22, 2003	Kitt Peak	Spacewatch	·	1.0 km	MPC · JPL
416417	2003 UB_{191}	—	October 2, 2003	Kitt Peak	Spacewatch	·	3.1 km	MPC · JPL
416418	2003 UZ_{194}	—	October 20, 2003	Kitt Peak	Spacewatch	·	930 m	MPC · JPL
416419	2003 UL_{205}	—	October 22, 2003	Socorro	LINEAR	·	2.3 km	MPC · JPL
416420	2003 UW_{210}	—	October 23, 2003	Kitt Peak	Spacewatch	NYS	1.1 km	MPC · JPL
416421	2003 UL_{221}	—	October 17, 2003	Kitt Peak	Spacewatch	EOS	2.5 km	MPC · JPL
416422	2003 UC_{222}	—	October 22, 2003	Kitt Peak	Spacewatch	·	2.4 km	MPC · JPL
416423	2003 UY_{230}	—	October 24, 2003	Socorro	LINEAR	·	1.4 km	MPC · JPL
416424	2003 UK_{231}	—	September 22, 2003	Kitt Peak	Spacewatch	·	990 m	MPC · JPL
416425	2003 UB_{233}	—	October 24, 2003	Socorro	LINEAR	V	760 m	MPC · JPL
416426	2003 UT_{236}	—	October 23, 2003	Kitt Peak	Spacewatch	·	2.7 km	MPC · JPL
416427	2003 UT_{241}	—	October 24, 2003	Socorro	LINEAR	NYS	910 m	MPC · JPL
416428	2003 UK_{249}	—	October 25, 2003	Socorro	LINEAR	·	1.2 km	MPC · JPL
416429	2003 UM_{260}	—	October 19, 2003	Kitt Peak	Spacewatch	EOS	1.8 km	MPC · JPL
416430	2003 UH_{264}	—	October 27, 2003	Socorro	LINEAR	·	1.1 km	MPC · JPL
416431	2003 UA_{267}	—	October 28, 2003	Socorro	LINEAR	NYS	1.1 km	MPC · JPL
416432	2003 UY_{278}	—	October 26, 2003	Kitt Peak	Spacewatch	·	1.0 km	MPC · JPL
416433	2003 UF_{295}	—	September 16, 2003	Kitt Peak	Spacewatch	·	2.1 km	MPC · JPL
416434	2003 UO_{315}	—	October 23, 2003	Kitt Peak	Spacewatch	·	820 m	MPC · JPL
416435	2003 UC_{317}	—	September 17, 2003	Kitt Peak	Spacewatch	·	1.7 km	MPC · JPL
416436	2003 UR_{317}	—	October 23, 2003	Apache Point	SDSS	·	780 m	MPC · JPL
416437	2003 UA_{338}	—	September 16, 2003	Kitt Peak	Spacewatch	EOS	1.5 km	MPC · JPL
416438	2003 UW_{345}	—	September 18, 2003	Kitt Peak	Spacewatch	EOS	1.5 km	MPC · JPL
416439	2003 UQ_{351}	—	October 19, 2003	Apache Point	SDSS	·	970 m	MPC · JPL
416440	2003 UL_{355}	—	October 19, 2003	Apache Point	SDSS	·	2.7 km	MPC · JPL
416441	2003 UG_{369}	—	October 21, 2003	Kitt Peak	Spacewatch	·	2.3 km	MPC · JPL
416442	2003 US_{371}	—	October 22, 2003	Apache Point	SDSS	·	2.5 km	MPC · JPL
416443	2003 UO_{376}	—	October 22, 2003	Apache Point	SDSS	BRA	1.6 km	MPC · JPL
416444	2003 UL_{380}	—	October 22, 2003	Apache Point	SDSS	V	540 m	MPC · JPL
416445	2003 UY_{400}	—	October 23, 2003	Apache Point	SDSS	(2076)	640 m	MPC · JPL
416446	2003 VY	—	November 5, 2003	Socorro	LINEAR	·	1.5 km	MPC · JPL
416447	2003 VG_{4}	—	November 14, 2003	Palomar	NEAT	·	1.3 km	MPC · JPL
416448	2003 VK_{4}	—	November 14, 2003	Palomar	NEAT	·	1.1 km	MPC · JPL
416449	2003 VZ_{6}	—	November 15, 2003	Kitt Peak	Spacewatch	·	2.3 km	MPC · JPL
416450	2003 VZ_{10}	—	November 15, 2003	Palomar	NEAT	·	1.5 km	MPC · JPL
416451	2003 VM_{12}	—	November 1, 2003	Socorro	LINEAR	·	980 m	MPC · JPL
416452	2003 WD_{3}	—	November 16, 2003	Kitt Peak	Spacewatch	·	3.7 km	MPC · JPL
416453	2003 WU_{4}	—	October 27, 2003	Kitt Peak	Spacewatch	·	1.1 km	MPC · JPL
416454	2003 WL_{10}	—	November 18, 2003	Kitt Peak	Spacewatch	·	1.1 km	MPC · JPL
416455	2003 WW_{14}	—	November 16, 2003	Kitt Peak	Spacewatch	·	2.7 km	MPC · JPL
416456	2003 WC_{19}	—	November 19, 2003	Socorro	LINEAR	·	2.9 km	MPC · JPL
416457	2003 WO_{20}	—	November 19, 2003	Socorro	LINEAR	·	3.3 km	MPC · JPL
416458	2003 WW_{20}	—	November 19, 2003	Socorro	LINEAR	H	670 m	MPC · JPL
416459	2003 WT_{36}	—	October 17, 2003	Kitt Peak	Spacewatch	EOS	2.0 km	MPC · JPL
416460	2003 WY_{40}	—	November 19, 2003	Kitt Peak	Spacewatch	T_{j} (2.98)	4.4 km	MPC · JPL
416461	2003 WT_{41}	—	November 20, 2003	Socorro	LINEAR	·	4.4 km	MPC · JPL
416462	2003 WC_{52}	—	November 19, 2003	Kitt Peak	Spacewatch	·	1.6 km	MPC · JPL
416463	2003 WV_{58}	—	November 18, 2003	Kitt Peak	Spacewatch	·	790 m	MPC · JPL
416464	2003 WX_{64}	—	November 19, 2003	Kitt Peak	Spacewatch	·	1.3 km	MPC · JPL
416465	2003 WT_{65}	—	November 19, 2003	Kitt Peak	Spacewatch	·	3.0 km	MPC · JPL
416466	2003 WG_{66}	—	November 19, 2003	Socorro	LINEAR	·	5.6 km	MPC · JPL
416467	2003 WJ_{69}	—	November 19, 2003	Kitt Peak	Spacewatch	·	2.2 km	MPC · JPL
416468	2003 WQ_{78}	—	November 20, 2003	Socorro	LINEAR	·	1.2 km	MPC · JPL
416469	2003 WA_{81}	—	November 20, 2003	Socorro	LINEAR	·	3.0 km	MPC · JPL
416470	2003 WD_{82}	—	November 19, 2003	Socorro	LINEAR	·	2.7 km	MPC · JPL
416471	2003 WZ_{86}	—	November 21, 2003	Socorro	LINEAR	·	1.5 km	MPC · JPL
416472	2003 WW_{88}	—	November 16, 2003	Catalina	CSS	·	860 m	MPC · JPL
416473	2003 WY_{91}	—	November 18, 2003	Kitt Peak	Spacewatch	·	2.6 km	MPC · JPL
416474	2003 WN_{92}	—	October 19, 2003	Palomar	NEAT	·	940 m	MPC · JPL
416475	2003 WE_{94}	—	November 19, 2003	Anderson Mesa	LONEOS	·	1.1 km	MPC · JPL
416476	2003 WJ_{104}	—	November 21, 2003	Socorro	LINEAR	·	2.9 km	MPC · JPL
416477	2003 WZ_{106}	—	November 22, 2003	Nogales	Tenagra II	EOS	2.4 km	MPC · JPL
416478	2003 WC_{109}	—	November 20, 2003	Socorro	LINEAR	·	1.3 km	MPC · JPL
416479	2003 WR_{109}	—	November 20, 2003	Socorro	LINEAR	·	2.0 km	MPC · JPL
416480	2003 WX_{109}	—	November 20, 2003	Socorro	LINEAR	·	3.2 km	MPC · JPL
416481	2003 WH_{110}	—	November 20, 2003	Socorro	LINEAR	·	910 m	MPC · JPL
416482	2003 WG_{115}	—	November 20, 2003	Socorro	LINEAR	·	4.0 km	MPC · JPL
416483	2003 WM_{116}	—	November 20, 2003	Socorro	LINEAR	·	5.9 km	MPC · JPL
416484	2003 WP_{127}	—	November 20, 2003	Socorro	LINEAR	·	6.1 km	MPC · JPL
416485	2003 WZ_{140}	—	November 21, 2003	Socorro	LINEAR	·	4.6 km	MPC · JPL
416486	2003 WK_{144}	—	November 21, 2003	Socorro	LINEAR	NYS	910 m	MPC · JPL
416487	2003 WL_{152}	—	November 19, 2003	Anderson Mesa	LONEOS	V	730 m	MPC · JPL
416488	2003 WJ_{153}	—	November 26, 2003	Anderson Mesa	LONEOS	·	2.9 km	MPC · JPL
416489	2003 WL_{156}	—	November 29, 2003	Socorro	LINEAR	PHO	970 m	MPC · JPL
416490	2003 WY_{156}	—	November 29, 2003	Kitt Peak	Spacewatch	·	1.9 km	MPC · JPL
416491	2003 WE_{158}	—	November 30, 2003	Kitt Peak	Spacewatch	·	440 m	MPC · JPL
416492	2003 WA_{187}	—	September 28, 2003	Kitt Peak	Spacewatch	·	2.0 km	MPC · JPL
416493	2003 WR_{187}	—	October 2, 2003	Kitt Peak	Spacewatch	·	910 m	MPC · JPL
416494	2003 XU_{18}	—	October 22, 2003	Anderson Mesa	LONEOS	H	730 m	MPC · JPL
416495	2003 XA_{19}	—	December 14, 2003	Kitt Peak	Spacewatch	·	2.9 km	MPC · JPL
416496	2003 XR_{20}	—	December 14, 2003	Palomar	NEAT	·	3.5 km	MPC · JPL
416497	2003 XA_{21}	—	November 26, 2003	Kitt Peak	Spacewatch	·	1.3 km	MPC · JPL
416498	2003 XS_{29}	—	November 19, 2003	Kitt Peak	Spacewatch	·	900 m	MPC · JPL
416499	2003 XK_{34}	—	November 19, 2003	Kitt Peak	Spacewatch	·	3.9 km	MPC · JPL
416500	2003 XX_{42}	—	December 15, 2003	Socorro	LINEAR	·	3.7 km	MPC · JPL

== 416501–416600 ==
back to top

Designation			Discovery			Properties		Ref
Permanent	Provisional	Named after	Date	Site	Discoverer(s)	Category	Diam.	Ref
416501	2003 YU_{1}	—	December 18, 2003	Socorro	LINEAR	·	550 m	MPC · JPL
416502	2003 YT_{7}	—	December 20, 2003	Nashville	Clingan, R.	L5	13 km	MPC · JPL
416503	2003 YK_{10}	—	December 17, 2003	Socorro	LINEAR	·	3.3 km	MPC · JPL
416504	2003 YT_{12}	—	December 17, 2003	Anderson Mesa	LONEOS	·	4.4 km	MPC · JPL
416505	2003 YW_{40}	—	December 19, 2003	Kitt Peak	Spacewatch	·	3.6 km	MPC · JPL
416506	2003 YM_{44}	—	December 19, 2003	Kitt Peak	Spacewatch	·	3.1 km	MPC · JPL
416507	2003 YF_{46}	—	December 17, 2003	Socorro	LINEAR	THB	3.6 km	MPC · JPL
416508	2003 YB_{63}	—	December 19, 2003	Socorro	LINEAR	·	6.2 km	MPC · JPL
416509	2003 YN_{65}	—	December 19, 2003	Socorro	LINEAR	·	2.8 km	MPC · JPL
416510	2003 YF_{70}	—	December 21, 2003	Socorro	LINEAR	H	630 m	MPC · JPL
416511	2003 YT_{77}	—	December 18, 2003	Socorro	LINEAR	·	2.5 km	MPC · JPL
416512	2003 YK_{92}	—	December 21, 2003	Socorro	LINEAR	EMA	3.2 km	MPC · JPL
416513	2003 YU_{93}	—	December 21, 2003	Needville	Needville	L5	10 km	MPC · JPL
416514	2003 YP_{96}	—	December 19, 2003	Socorro	LINEAR	·	3.3 km	MPC · JPL
416515	2003 YV_{111}	—	December 23, 2003	Socorro	LINEAR	·	3.8 km	MPC · JPL
416516	2003 YC_{112}	—	December 17, 2003	Socorro	LINEAR	·	1.1 km	MPC · JPL
416517	2003 YK_{113}	—	December 23, 2003	Socorro	LINEAR	·	1.1 km	MPC · JPL
416518	2003 YX_{119}	—	December 27, 2003	Socorro	LINEAR	·	1.2 km	MPC · JPL
416519	2003 YY_{119}	—	December 27, 2003	Socorro	LINEAR	T_{j} (2.98)	2.8 km	MPC · JPL
416520	2003 YT_{123}	—	December 28, 2003	Kitt Peak	Spacewatch	NYS	1.0 km	MPC · JPL
416521	2003 YR_{124}	—	December 28, 2003	Socorro	LINEAR	H	760 m	MPC · JPL
416522	2003 YX_{134}	—	December 28, 2003	Kitt Peak	Spacewatch	·	4.6 km	MPC · JPL
416523	2003 YM_{141}	—	December 28, 2003	Socorro	LINEAR	·	1.2 km	MPC · JPL
416524	2003 YO_{146}	—	December 28, 2003	Socorro	LINEAR	·	3.0 km	MPC · JPL
416525	2003 YD_{170}	—	December 18, 2003	Kitt Peak	Spacewatch	·	3.8 km	MPC · JPL
416526	2003 YK_{171}	—	December 18, 2003	Kitt Peak	Spacewatch	·	2.8 km	MPC · JPL
416527	2003 YY_{172}	—	December 19, 2003	Kitt Peak	Spacewatch	·	930 m	MPC · JPL
416528	2003 YG_{181}	—	December 22, 2003	Kitt Peak	Spacewatch	·	2.7 km	MPC · JPL
416529	2003 YR_{181}	—	December 21, 2003	Apache Point	SDSS	NYS	1.1 km	MPC · JPL
416530	2003 YN_{182}	—	December 22, 2003	Kitt Peak	Spacewatch	·	3.4 km	MPC · JPL
416531	2004 AK_{6}	—	December 21, 2003	Kitt Peak	Spacewatch	·	2.5 km	MPC · JPL
416532	2004 AX_{6}	—	January 15, 2004	Kitt Peak	Spacewatch	·	3.8 km	MPC · JPL
416533	2004 AW_{11}	—	January 13, 2004	Kitt Peak	Spacewatch	·	3.7 km	MPC · JPL
416534	2004 BQ_{6}	—	January 17, 2004	Haleakala	NEAT	H	700 m	MPC · JPL
416535	2004 BD_{13}	—	January 17, 2004	Palomar	NEAT	PHO	2.5 km	MPC · JPL
416536	2004 BV_{16}	—	January 16, 2004	Catalina	CSS	·	3.3 km	MPC · JPL
416537	2004 BW_{38}	—	January 20, 2004	Socorro	LINEAR	·	1.2 km	MPC · JPL
416538	2004 BM_{47}	—	December 27, 2003	Kitt Peak	Spacewatch	·	4.9 km	MPC · JPL
416539	2004 BE_{50}	—	January 21, 2004	Socorro	LINEAR	T_{j} (2.97)	4.0 km	MPC · JPL
416540	2004 BB_{55}	—	January 22, 2004	Socorro	LINEAR	·	1.3 km	MPC · JPL
416541	2004 BV_{57}	—	January 23, 2004	Anderson Mesa	LONEOS	PHO	940 m	MPC · JPL
416542	2004 BK_{62}	—	January 22, 2004	Socorro	LINEAR	·	3.4 km	MPC · JPL
416543	2004 BX_{63}	—	January 22, 2004	Socorro	LINEAR	·	4.5 km	MPC · JPL
416544	2004 BA_{64}	—	January 22, 2004	Socorro	LINEAR	·	3.4 km	MPC · JPL
416545	2004 BX_{68}	—	January 27, 2004	Socorro	LINEAR	·	4.4 km	MPC · JPL
416546	2004 BE_{69}	—	January 20, 2004	Kingsnake	J. V. McClusky	THB	3.8 km	MPC · JPL
416547	2004 BX_{75}	—	January 23, 2004	Socorro	LINEAR	·	3.2 km	MPC · JPL
416548	2004 BJ_{80}	—	January 24, 2004	Socorro	LINEAR	·	4.4 km	MPC · JPL
416549	2004 BK_{80}	—	January 24, 2004	Socorro	LINEAR	·	3.4 km	MPC · JPL
416550	2004 BH_{103}	—	January 31, 2004	Socorro	LINEAR	·	3.6 km	MPC · JPL
416551	2004 BJ_{116}	—	December 27, 2003	Socorro	LINEAR	·	1.2 km	MPC · JPL
416552	2004 BG_{124}	—	January 18, 2004	Palomar	NEAT	·	2.6 km	MPC · JPL
416553	2004 CE_{13}	—	February 11, 2004	Palomar	NEAT	·	4.3 km	MPC · JPL
416554	2004 CB_{26}	—	February 11, 2004	Kitt Peak	Spacewatch	·	1.3 km	MPC · JPL
416555	2004 CE_{26}	—	February 11, 2004	Kitt Peak	Spacewatch	·	5.3 km	MPC · JPL
416556	2004 CW_{47}	—	February 14, 2004	Haleakala	NEAT	·	3.5 km	MPC · JPL
416557	2004 CF_{51}	—	January 16, 2004	Palomar	NEAT	·	3.2 km	MPC · JPL
416558	2004 CD_{52}	—	February 14, 2004	Socorro	LINEAR	·	1.6 km	MPC · JPL
416559	2004 CN_{55}	—	February 12, 2004	Kitt Peak	Spacewatch	·	3.2 km	MPC · JPL
416560	2004 CQ_{55}	—	February 13, 2004	Kitt Peak	Spacewatch	·	2.7 km	MPC · JPL
416561	2004 CD_{58}	—	February 14, 2004	Socorro	LINEAR	·	4.3 km	MPC · JPL
416562	2004 CK_{116}	—	February 11, 2004	Kitt Peak	Spacewatch	MAS	710 m	MPC · JPL
416563	2004 CH_{118}	—	February 11, 2004	Kitt Peak	Spacewatch	·	1.9 km	MPC · JPL
416564	2004 CM_{128}	—	January 18, 2004	Catalina	CSS	·	3.0 km	MPC · JPL
416565	2004 DG_{3}	—	February 16, 2004	Kitt Peak	Spacewatch	·	1.1 km	MPC · JPL
416566	2004 DB_{60}	—	February 26, 2004	Socorro	LINEAR	·	3.2 km	MPC · JPL
416567	2004 EB	—	March 9, 2004	Palomar	NEAT	T_{j} (2.76) · AMO +1km	2.5 km	MPC · JPL
416568	2004 ET_{20}	—	March 15, 2004	Socorro	LINEAR	·	3.6 km	MPC · JPL
416569	2004 EL_{28}	—	March 15, 2004	Kitt Peak	Spacewatch	CYB	3.2 km	MPC · JPL
416570	2004 EA_{31}	—	March 15, 2004	Kitt Peak	Spacewatch	H	580 m	MPC · JPL
416571	2004 EY_{41}	—	March 15, 2004	Socorro	LINEAR	·	4.0 km	MPC · JPL
416572	2004 EM_{42}	—	March 15, 2004	Socorro	LINEAR	·	1.6 km	MPC · JPL
416573	2004 EK_{61}	—	March 12, 2004	Palomar	NEAT	·	960 m	MPC · JPL
416574	2004 EY_{80}	—	March 15, 2004	Socorro	LINEAR	·	3.2 km	MPC · JPL
416575	2004 EZ_{82}	—	March 13, 2004	Palomar	NEAT	·	1.5 km	MPC · JPL
416576	2004 EC_{86}	—	March 15, 2004	Socorro	LINEAR	·	3.4 km	MPC · JPL
416577	2004 EP_{98}	—	March 15, 2004	Kitt Peak	Spacewatch	·	1.8 km	MPC · JPL
416578	2004 FX_{86}	—	September 18, 2001	Kitt Peak	Spacewatch	·	3.5 km	MPC · JPL
416579	2004 FF_{97}	—	March 23, 2004	Socorro	LINEAR	PHO	1.0 km	MPC · JPL
416580	2004 GR_{2}	—	April 12, 2004	Socorro	LINEAR	T_{j} (2.91)	2.2 km	MPC · JPL
416581	2004 GP_{81}	—	April 13, 2004	Kitt Peak	Spacewatch	·	1.7 km	MPC · JPL
416582	2004 HA_{26}	—	April 19, 2004	Socorro	LINEAR	·	1.9 km	MPC · JPL
416583 Jacereece	2004 JH	Jacereece	May 8, 2004	Wrightwood	J. W. Young	·	1.7 km	MPC · JPL
416584	2004 JB_{12}	—	May 13, 2004	Socorro	LINEAR	AMO	570 m	MPC · JPL
416585	2004 JU_{24}	—	May 15, 2004	Socorro	LINEAR	JUN	1.2 km	MPC · JPL
416586	2004 JX_{24}	—	May 15, 2004	Socorro	LINEAR	·	1.7 km	MPC · JPL
416587	2004 JQ_{25}	—	May 15, 2004	Socorro	LINEAR	·	2.2 km	MPC · JPL
416588	2004 JS_{31}	—	May 15, 2004	Socorro	LINEAR	·	1.3 km	MPC · JPL
416589	2004 KV	—	May 17, 2004	Reedy Creek	J. Broughton	·	1.8 km	MPC · JPL
416590	2004 LM_{1}	—	June 10, 2004	Socorro	LINEAR	T_{j} (2.99)	4.2 km	MPC · JPL
416591	2004 LC_{2}	—	June 11, 2004	Socorro	LINEAR	APO · PHA	660 m	MPC · JPL
416592	2004 LP_{3}	—	June 11, 2004	Anderson Mesa	LONEOS	·	2.6 km	MPC · JPL
416593	2004 LB_{13}	—	June 9, 2004	Anderson Mesa	LONEOS	·	1.9 km	MPC · JPL
416594	2004 NC_{6}	—	July 11, 2004	Socorro	LINEAR	·	2.6 km	MPC · JPL
416595	2004 NZ_{8}	—	July 14, 2004	Reedy Creek	J. Broughton	·	2.8 km	MPC · JPL
416596	2004 NA_{15}	—	July 11, 2004	Socorro	LINEAR	MAR	1.3 km	MPC · JPL
416597	2004 OS_{4}	—	July 16, 2004	Socorro	LINEAR	·	680 m	MPC · JPL
416598	2004 PR_{13}	—	August 7, 2004	Palomar	NEAT	·	790 m	MPC · JPL
416599	2004 PJ_{54}	—	August 8, 2004	Anderson Mesa	LONEOS	·	2.0 km	MPC · JPL
416600	2004 PV_{68}	—	August 7, 2004	Campo Imperatore	CINEOS	·	2.0 km	MPC · JPL

== 416601–416700 ==
back to top

Designation			Discovery			Properties		Ref
Permanent	Provisional	Named after	Date	Site	Discoverer(s)	Category	Diam.	Ref
416601	2004 PW_{78}	—	March 24, 2003	Kitt Peak	Spacewatch	DOR	2.8 km	MPC · JPL
416602	2004 PW_{79}	—	August 9, 2004	Anderson Mesa	LONEOS	MAR	1.4 km	MPC · JPL
416603	2004 PO_{99}	—	August 3, 2004	Siding Spring	SSS	·	680 m	MPC · JPL
416604	2004 PD_{104}	—	August 12, 2004	Socorro	LINEAR	·	630 m	MPC · JPL
416605	2004 PV_{116}	—	August 12, 2004	Mauna Kea	P. A. Wiegert	·	1.5 km	MPC · JPL
416606	2004 QK_{2}	—	August 19, 2004	Reedy Creek	J. Broughton	·	2.4 km	MPC · JPL
416607	2004 QJ_{28}	—	August 25, 2004	Kitt Peak	Spacewatch	GEF	1.2 km	MPC · JPL
416608	2004 RH_{27}	—	August 13, 2004	Cerro Tololo	Deep Ecliptic Survey	·	630 m	MPC · JPL
416609	2004 RW_{34}	—	September 7, 2004	Socorro	LINEAR	·	2.2 km	MPC · JPL
416610	2004 RE_{38}	—	September 7, 2004	Socorro	LINEAR	·	750 m	MPC · JPL
416611	2004 RB_{44}	—	September 8, 2004	Socorro	LINEAR	·	2.4 km	MPC · JPL
416612	2004 RQ_{44}	—	September 8, 2004	Socorro	LINEAR	·	1.6 km	MPC · JPL
416613	2004 RD_{47}	—	September 8, 2004	Socorro	LINEAR	·	1.8 km	MPC · JPL
416614	2004 RD_{70}	—	September 8, 2004	Socorro	LINEAR	·	640 m	MPC · JPL
416615	2004 RS_{93}	—	September 8, 2004	Socorro	LINEAR	·	1.9 km	MPC · JPL
416616	2004 RX_{97}	—	September 8, 2004	Socorro	LINEAR	·	2.0 km	MPC · JPL
416617	2004 RL_{136}	—	September 7, 2004	Palomar	NEAT	·	3.4 km	MPC · JPL
416618	2004 RD_{138}	—	September 8, 2004	Palomar	NEAT	·	2.8 km	MPC · JPL
416619	2004 RV_{142}	—	September 8, 2004	Palomar	NEAT	·	3.1 km	MPC · JPL
416620	2004 RK_{162}	—	September 11, 2004	Socorro	LINEAR	·	700 m	MPC · JPL
416621	2004 RE_{178}	—	September 10, 2004	Socorro	LINEAR	·	2.9 km	MPC · JPL
416622	2004 RU_{182}	—	September 10, 2004	Socorro	LINEAR	BRA	1.8 km	MPC · JPL
416623	2004 RK_{185}	—	September 10, 2004	Socorro	LINEAR	·	600 m	MPC · JPL
416624	2004 RG_{215}	—	September 11, 2004	Socorro	LINEAR	·	3.0 km	MPC · JPL
416625	2004 RU_{227}	—	September 9, 2004	Kitt Peak	Spacewatch	BRA	2.0 km	MPC · JPL
416626	2004 RB_{233}	—	September 9, 2004	Kitt Peak	Spacewatch	·	1.7 km	MPC · JPL
416627	2004 RV_{237}	—	September 10, 2004	Kitt Peak	Spacewatch	·	1.6 km	MPC · JPL
416628	2004 RV_{244}	—	July 17, 2004	Cerro Tololo	Deep Ecliptic Survey	·	1.8 km	MPC · JPL
416629	2004 RZ_{249}	—	September 13, 2004	Socorro	LINEAR	·	2.1 km	MPC · JPL
416630	2004 RF_{305}	—	September 12, 2004	Kitt Peak	Spacewatch	·	1.7 km	MPC · JPL
416631	2004 RM_{312}	—	September 15, 2004	Anderson Mesa	LONEOS	·	850 m	MPC · JPL
416632	2004 RO_{316}	—	September 11, 2004	Socorro	LINEAR	·	940 m	MPC · JPL
416633	2004 RA_{332}	—	September 14, 2004	Palomar	NEAT	GEF	1.3 km	MPC · JPL
416634	2004 RZ_{333}	—	September 7, 2004	Socorro	LINEAR	·	2.4 km	MPC · JPL
416635	2004 RN_{346}	—	September 10, 2004	Socorro	LINEAR	·	620 m	MPC · JPL
416636	2004 SL_{9}	—	September 16, 2004	Socorro	LINEAR	·	3.6 km	MPC · JPL
416637	2004 SA_{16}	—	September 17, 2004	Anderson Mesa	LONEOS	·	2.7 km	MPC · JPL
416638	2004 SL_{29}	—	September 17, 2004	Socorro	LINEAR	·	670 m	MPC · JPL
416639	2004 TF_{21}	—	October 2, 2004	Palomar	NEAT	·	2.5 km	MPC · JPL
416640	2004 TC_{24}	—	October 4, 2004	Kitt Peak	Spacewatch	·	720 m	MPC · JPL
416641	2004 TW_{27}	—	October 4, 2004	Kitt Peak	Spacewatch	·	2.3 km	MPC · JPL
416642	2004 TZ_{45}	—	October 4, 2004	Kitt Peak	Spacewatch	EOS	1.9 km	MPC · JPL
416643	2004 TK_{73}	—	October 6, 2004	Kitt Peak	Spacewatch	KOR	1.2 km	MPC · JPL
416644	2004 TP_{76}	—	October 7, 2004	Socorro	LINEAR	·	650 m	MPC · JPL
416645	2004 TV_{76}	—	September 23, 2004	Kitt Peak	Spacewatch	·	620 m	MPC · JPL
416646	2004 TQ_{82}	—	October 13, 2001	Kitt Peak	Spacewatch	·	810 m	MPC · JPL
416647	2004 TA_{96}	—	October 10, 1994	Kitt Peak	Spacewatch	·	540 m	MPC · JPL
416648	2004 TY_{99}	—	October 5, 2004	Kitt Peak	Spacewatch	·	1.8 km	MPC · JPL
416649	2004 TP_{101}	—	October 6, 2004	Kitt Peak	Spacewatch	·	740 m	MPC · JPL
416650	2004 TW_{102}	—	October 6, 2004	Palomar	NEAT	·	2.5 km	MPC · JPL
416651	2004 TL_{117}	—	September 17, 2004	Socorro	LINEAR	·	700 m	MPC · JPL
416652	2004 TX_{136}	—	October 8, 2004	Anderson Mesa	LONEOS	·	3.0 km	MPC · JPL
416653	2004 TO_{159}	—	October 6, 2004	Kitt Peak	Spacewatch	·	2.6 km	MPC · JPL
416654	2004 TF_{174}	—	October 9, 2004	Socorro	LINEAR	·	2.4 km	MPC · JPL
416655	2004 TJ_{185}	—	October 7, 2004	Kitt Peak	Spacewatch	EOS	1.5 km	MPC · JPL
416656	2004 TZ_{189}	—	October 7, 2004	Kitt Peak	Spacewatch	·	1.5 km	MPC · JPL
416657	2004 TU_{208}	—	September 14, 2004	Palomar	NEAT	·	650 m	MPC · JPL
416658	2004 TC_{212}	—	October 8, 2004	Kitt Peak	Spacewatch	·	640 m	MPC · JPL
416659	2004 TA_{226}	—	October 8, 2004	Kitt Peak	Spacewatch	·	630 m	MPC · JPL
416660	2004 TQ_{234}	—	October 8, 2004	Kitt Peak	Spacewatch	HOF	2.4 km	MPC · JPL
416661	2004 TQ_{266}	—	October 9, 2004	Kitt Peak	Spacewatch	·	2.9 km	MPC · JPL
416662	2004 TO_{277}	—	October 9, 2004	Kitt Peak	Spacewatch	·	2.0 km	MPC · JPL
416663	2004 TZ_{280}	—	October 10, 2004	Kitt Peak	Spacewatch	·	500 m	MPC · JPL
416664	2004 TB_{328}	—	October 4, 2004	Palomar	NEAT	·	2.5 km	MPC · JPL
416665	2004 TO_{335}	—	October 10, 2004	Kitt Peak	Spacewatch	·	1.9 km	MPC · JPL
416666	2004 TX_{350}	—	October 10, 2004	Kitt Peak	Spacewatch	AGN	1.4 km	MPC · JPL
416667	2004 TH_{355}	—	October 7, 2004	Socorro	LINEAR	·	3.3 km	MPC · JPL
416668	2004 UU_{4}	—	October 16, 2004	Socorro	LINEAR	PHO	2.1 km	MPC · JPL
416669	2004 UB_{8}	—	October 21, 2004	Socorro	LINEAR	·	1.6 km	MPC · JPL
416670	2004 VG_{3}	—	October 9, 2004	Kitt Peak	Spacewatch	·	730 m	MPC · JPL
416671	2004 VA_{38}	—	November 4, 2004	Kitt Peak	Spacewatch	THM	1.8 km	MPC · JPL
416672	2004 VT_{40}	—	October 15, 2004	Kitt Peak	Spacewatch	·	2.8 km	MPC · JPL
416673	2004 VG_{53}	—	November 5, 2004	Palomar	NEAT	H	540 m	MPC · JPL
416674	2004 VP_{107}	—	November 9, 2004	Mauna Kea	Veillet, C.	KOR	1.0 km	MPC · JPL
416675	2004 XJ_{3}	—	December 3, 2004	Catalina	CSS	T_{j} (2.81) · AMO +1km · critical	1 km	MPC · JPL
416676	2004 XO_{5}	—	December 2, 2004	Catalina	CSS	·	1.1 km	MPC · JPL
416677	2004 XQ_{5}	—	December 2, 2004	Desert Moon	Stevens, B. L.	·	550 m	MPC · JPL
416678	2004 XT_{5}	—	December 7, 2004	Socorro	LINEAR	·	1.4 km	MPC · JPL
416679	2004 XR_{44}	—	December 2, 2004	Catalina	CSS	EOS	2.7 km	MPC · JPL
416680	2004 XD_{50}	—	December 12, 2004	Socorro	LINEAR	AMO	690 m	MPC · JPL
416681	2004 XE_{57}	—	September 20, 2003	Kitt Peak	Spacewatch	TEL	1.3 km	MPC · JPL
416682	2004 XH_{59}	—	December 10, 2004	Kitt Peak	Spacewatch	·	2.5 km	MPC · JPL
416683	2004 XB_{79}	—	December 10, 2004	Kitt Peak	Spacewatch	·	3.5 km	MPC · JPL
416684	2004 XV_{87}	—	December 9, 2004	Catalina	CSS	·	2.9 km	MPC · JPL
416685	2004 XD_{90}	—	December 11, 2004	Kitt Peak	Spacewatch	KOR	1.4 km	MPC · JPL
416686	2004 XK_{97}	—	December 11, 2004	Kitt Peak	Spacewatch	·	800 m	MPC · JPL
416687	2004 XD_{126}	—	November 11, 2004	Kitt Peak	Spacewatch	KOR	2.1 km	MPC · JPL
416688	2004 XM_{129}	—	December 15, 2004	Kitt Peak	Spacewatch	·	2.7 km	MPC · JPL
416689	2004 XJ_{148}	—	December 15, 2004	Needville	J. Dellinger, A. Lowe	·	970 m	MPC · JPL
416690	2004 XP_{160}	—	December 14, 2004	Kitt Peak	Spacewatch	(2076)	830 m	MPC · JPL
416691	2004 YS_{7}	—	December 18, 2004	Mount Lemmon	Mount Lemmon Survey	·	680 m	MPC · JPL
416692	2004 YO_{12}	—	December 18, 2004	Mount Lemmon	Mount Lemmon Survey	EOS	3.9 km	MPC · JPL
416693	2004 YU_{20}	—	December 18, 2004	Mount Lemmon	Mount Lemmon Survey	L5	10 km	MPC · JPL
416694	2004 YR_{32}	—	December 22, 2004	Catalina	CSS	T_{j} (2.72) · APO +1km	2.3 km	MPC · JPL
416695	2005 AM_{10}	—	January 6, 2005	Socorro	LINEAR	·	720 m	MPC · JPL
416696	2005 AV_{10}	—	January 6, 2005	Catalina	CSS	·	3.5 km	MPC · JPL
416697	2005 AG_{20}	—	January 6, 2005	Socorro	LINEAR	·	1.8 km	MPC · JPL
416698	2005 AV_{21}	—	December 13, 2004	Kitt Peak	Spacewatch	H	590 m	MPC · JPL
416699	2005 AK_{34}	—	January 13, 2005	Kitt Peak	Spacewatch	·	3.4 km	MPC · JPL
416700	2005 AR_{34}	—	December 20, 2004	Mount Lemmon	Mount Lemmon Survey	·	2.7 km	MPC · JPL

== 416701–416800 ==
back to top

Designation			Discovery			Properties		Ref
Permanent	Provisional	Named after	Date	Site	Discoverer(s)	Category	Diam.	Ref
416701	2005 AA_{45}	—	January 15, 2005	Kitt Peak	Spacewatch	·	670 m	MPC · JPL
416702	2005 AY_{47}	—	January 13, 2005	Kitt Peak	Spacewatch	·	560 m	MPC · JPL
416703	2005 AY_{59}	—	January 15, 2005	Socorro	LINEAR	·	3.6 km	MPC · JPL
416704	2005 AK_{64}	—	December 19, 2004	Mount Lemmon	Mount Lemmon Survey	·	590 m	MPC · JPL
416705	2005 AR_{64}	—	January 13, 2005	Kitt Peak	Spacewatch	L5	8.9 km	MPC · JPL
416706	2005 AS_{65}	—	January 13, 2005	Kitt Peak	Spacewatch	·	1.8 km	MPC · JPL
416707	2005 AL_{69}	—	December 14, 2004	Socorro	LINEAR	·	500 m	MPC · JPL
416708	2005 AL_{74}	—	January 15, 2005	Kitt Peak	Spacewatch	L5	13 km	MPC · JPL
416709	2005 AB_{77}	—	January 15, 2005	Kitt Peak	Spacewatch	·	1.7 km	MPC · JPL
416710	2005 BR_{5}	—	January 16, 2005	Socorro	LINEAR	·	580 m	MPC · JPL
416711	2005 BX_{15}	—	January 16, 2005	Kitt Peak	Spacewatch	·	3.0 km	MPC · JPL
416712	2005 BD_{28}	—	January 17, 2005	Kitt Peak	Spacewatch	H	580 m	MPC · JPL
416713	2005 BR_{33}	—	December 20, 2004	Mount Lemmon	Mount Lemmon Survey	L5	10 km	MPC · JPL
416714	2005 BC_{38}	—	January 16, 2005	Mauna Kea	Veillet, C.	EOS	2.1 km	MPC · JPL
416715	2005 CX_{18}	—	January 17, 2005	Kitt Peak	Spacewatch	·	850 m	MPC · JPL
416716	2005 CY_{28}	—	February 1, 2005	Kitt Peak	Spacewatch	·	2.7 km	MPC · JPL
416717	2005 CR_{29}	—	February 1, 2005	Catalina	CSS	·	810 m	MPC · JPL
416718	2005 CX_{34}	—	February 2, 2005	Kitt Peak	Spacewatch	V	760 m	MPC · JPL
416719	2005 CG_{43}	—	February 2, 2005	Catalina	CSS	·	3.7 km	MPC · JPL
416720	2005 CC_{50}	—	February 2, 2005	Socorro	LINEAR	·	3.8 km	MPC · JPL
416721	2005 CW_{62}	—	February 9, 2005	Kitt Peak	Spacewatch	·	700 m	MPC · JPL
416722	2005 CZ_{72}	—	February 1, 2005	Kitt Peak	Spacewatch	·	4.5 km	MPC · JPL
416723	2005 CM_{76}	—	February 3, 2005	Socorro	LINEAR	·	4.2 km	MPC · JPL
416724	2005 CN_{76}	—	February 3, 2005	Socorro	LINEAR	·	4.7 km	MPC · JPL
416725	2005 CQ_{78}	—	February 14, 2005	Socorro	LINEAR	·	740 m	MPC · JPL
416726	2005 CY_{78}	—	February 14, 2005	Catalina	CSS	·	2.8 km	MPC · JPL
416727	2005 CV_{79}	—	February 1, 2005	Kitt Peak	Spacewatch	·	3.5 km	MPC · JPL
416728	2005 CW_{80}	—	February 2, 2005	Palomar	NEAT	·	890 m	MPC · JPL
416729	2005 DC_{1}	—	February 28, 2005	Socorro	LINEAR	H	700 m	MPC · JPL
416730	2005 EF_{2}	—	March 2, 2005	Catalina	CSS	H	620 m	MPC · JPL
416731	2005 EO_{8}	—	March 2, 2005	Kitt Peak	Spacewatch	·	2.4 km	MPC · JPL
416732	2005 EJ_{17}	—	March 3, 2005	Kitt Peak	Spacewatch	THM	1.9 km	MPC · JPL
416733	2005 EA_{27}	—	March 3, 2005	Catalina	CSS	·	1.2 km	MPC · JPL
416734	2005 EA_{31}	—	March 1, 2005	Kitt Peak	Spacewatch	·	1.2 km	MPC · JPL
416735	2005 EF_{34}	—	March 3, 2005	Catalina	CSS	·	1.3 km	MPC · JPL
416736	2005 EJ_{43}	—	March 3, 2005	Kitt Peak	Spacewatch	EOS	2.2 km	MPC · JPL
416737	2005 ER_{46}	—	March 3, 2005	Catalina	CSS	·	3.2 km	MPC · JPL
416738	2005 EK_{52}	—	March 4, 2005	Kitt Peak	Spacewatch	·	2.9 km	MPC · JPL
416739	2005 EH_{53}	—	March 4, 2005	Kitt Peak	Spacewatch	·	2.7 km	MPC · JPL
416740	2005 EP_{67}	—	March 4, 2005	Mount Lemmon	Mount Lemmon Survey	·	1.2 km	MPC · JPL
416741	2005 EX_{69}	—	March 8, 2005	Catalina	CSS	·	1.1 km	MPC · JPL
416742	2005 EG_{70}	—	February 1, 2005	Catalina	CSS	H	690 m	MPC · JPL
416743	2005 EY_{74}	—	March 3, 2005	Kitt Peak	Spacewatch	·	3.6 km	MPC · JPL
416744	2005 ES_{86}	—	March 4, 2005	Catalina	CSS	·	4.9 km	MPC · JPL
416745	2005 EG_{93}	—	March 8, 2005	Socorro	LINEAR	·	3.2 km	MPC · JPL
416746	2005 EO_{93}	—	March 8, 2005	Socorro	LINEAR	·	3.7 km	MPC · JPL
416747	2005 EH_{99}	—	March 3, 2005	Catalina	CSS	·	740 m	MPC · JPL
416748	2005 ET_{103}	—	March 4, 2005	Mount Lemmon	Mount Lemmon Survey	·	1.1 km	MPC · JPL
416749	2005 EK_{105}	—	January 17, 2005	Kitt Peak	Spacewatch	·	660 m	MPC · JPL
416750	2005 EC_{108}	—	March 4, 2005	Mount Lemmon	Mount Lemmon Survey	·	1.2 km	MPC · JPL
416751	2005 ES_{117}	—	March 4, 2005	Mount Lemmon	Mount Lemmon Survey	·	3.3 km	MPC · JPL
416752	2005 EL_{126}	—	March 8, 2005	Mount Lemmon	Mount Lemmon Survey	·	1.1 km	MPC · JPL
416753	2005 EV_{135}	—	March 9, 2005	Anderson Mesa	LONEOS	·	1.0 km	MPC · JPL
416754	2005 EM_{137}	—	March 9, 2005	Mount Lemmon	Mount Lemmon Survey	HYG	2.5 km	MPC · JPL
416755	2005 EB_{141}	—	March 10, 2005	Catalina	CSS	LIX	4.2 km	MPC · JPL
416756	2005 EW_{143}	—	March 10, 2005	Mount Lemmon	Mount Lemmon Survey	·	800 m	MPC · JPL
416757	2005 EJ_{148}	—	March 10, 2005	Kitt Peak	Spacewatch	·	1.2 km	MPC · JPL
416758	2005 EP_{155}	—	March 8, 2005	Mount Lemmon	Mount Lemmon Survey	·	3.0 km	MPC · JPL
416759	2005 ET_{169}	—	March 1, 2005	Catalina	CSS	·	1.4 km	MPC · JPL
416760	2005 EQ_{193}	—	March 11, 2005	Mount Lemmon	Mount Lemmon Survey	·	650 m	MPC · JPL
416761	2005 EL_{200}	—	March 12, 2005	Siding Spring	SSS	·	5.5 km	MPC · JPL
416762	2005 EL_{202}	—	March 8, 2005	Catalina	CSS	H	670 m	MPC · JPL
416763	2005 EY_{213}	—	March 7, 2005	Socorro	LINEAR	·	2.0 km	MPC · JPL
416764	2005 EY_{215}	—	March 8, 2005	Mount Lemmon	Mount Lemmon Survey	·	1.4 km	MPC · JPL
416765	2005 ET_{218}	—	March 10, 2005	Anderson Mesa	LONEOS	·	880 m	MPC · JPL
416766	2005 EU_{218}	—	March 10, 2005	Anderson Mesa	LONEOS	·	870 m	MPC · JPL
416767	2005 EO_{233}	—	March 10, 2005	Anderson Mesa	LONEOS	·	4.0 km	MPC · JPL
416768	2005 EB_{234}	—	March 3, 2005	Catalina	CSS	·	1.1 km	MPC · JPL
416769	2005 EC_{237}	—	March 11, 2005	Kitt Peak	Spacewatch	·	2.8 km	MPC · JPL
416770	2005 ER_{245}	—	March 3, 2005	Kitt Peak	Spacewatch	·	3.9 km	MPC · JPL
416771	2005 EJ_{261}	—	March 12, 2005	Kitt Peak	Spacewatch	NYS	930 m	MPC · JPL
416772	2005 EQ_{272}	—	January 17, 2005	Kitt Peak	Spacewatch	L5	7.9 km	MPC · JPL
416773	2005 EW_{274}	—	March 8, 2005	Anderson Mesa	LONEOS	·	860 m	MPC · JPL
416774	2005 EG_{286}	—	March 4, 2005	Catalina	CSS	·	3.8 km	MPC · JPL
416775	2005 EZ_{288}	—	March 9, 2005	Kitt Peak	Spacewatch	EOS	1.6 km	MPC · JPL
416776	2005 EM_{298}	—	November 17, 2001	Kitt Peak	Spacewatch	L5	8.0 km	MPC · JPL
416777	2005 EM_{312}	—	March 10, 2005	Kitt Peak	M. W. Buie	·	1.5 km	MPC · JPL
416778	2005 FY_{4}	—	March 30, 2005	Siding Spring	SSS	·	4.2 km	MPC · JPL
416779	2005 GR_{7}	—	April 1, 2005	Anderson Mesa	LONEOS	T_{j} (2.98)	3.4 km	MPC · JPL
416780	2005 GZ_{9}	—	April 1, 2005	Siding Spring	SSS	H	760 m	MPC · JPL
416781	2005 GH_{12}	—	April 1, 2005	Anderson Mesa	LONEOS	·	2.6 km	MPC · JPL
416782	2005 GG_{19}	—	April 2, 2005	Mount Lemmon	Mount Lemmon Survey	T_{j} (2.99)	3.9 km	MPC · JPL
416783	2005 GA_{37}	—	April 2, 2005	Catalina	CSS	·	3.3 km	MPC · JPL
416784	2005 GU_{50}	—	April 1, 2005	Kitt Peak	Spacewatch	·	4.8 km	MPC · JPL
416785	2005 GD_{51}	—	April 2, 2005	Palomar	NEAT	·	2.8 km	MPC · JPL
416786	2005 GR_{53}	—	April 4, 2005	Socorro	LINEAR	·	960 m	MPC · JPL
416787	2005 GY_{56}	—	March 14, 2005	Mount Lemmon	Mount Lemmon Survey	MAS	700 m	MPC · JPL
416788	2005 GT_{66}	—	April 2, 2005	Mount Lemmon	Mount Lemmon Survey	·	2.5 km	MPC · JPL
416789	2005 GF_{68}	—	April 2, 2005	Catalina	CSS	·	4.4 km	MPC · JPL
416790	2005 GG_{69}	—	April 2, 2005	Catalina	CSS	·	5.1 km	MPC · JPL
416791	2005 GH_{71}	—	April 4, 2005	Mount Lemmon	Mount Lemmon Survey	·	2.0 km	MPC · JPL
416792	2005 GC_{83}	—	March 30, 2000	Kitt Peak	Spacewatch	·	2.0 km	MPC · JPL
416793	2005 GR_{83}	—	March 14, 2005	Mount Lemmon	Mount Lemmon Survey	NYS	880 m	MPC · JPL
416794	2005 GW_{84}	—	April 4, 2005	Kitt Peak	Spacewatch	·	1.2 km	MPC · JPL
416795	2005 GL_{88}	—	April 5, 2005	Mount Lemmon	Mount Lemmon Survey	·	1.4 km	MPC · JPL
416796	2005 GM_{94}	—	April 6, 2005	Kitt Peak	Spacewatch	·	3.5 km	MPC · JPL
416797	2005 GF_{97}	—	April 7, 2005	Palomar	NEAT	·	4.6 km	MPC · JPL
416798	2005 GQ_{98}	—	April 7, 2005	Palomar	NEAT	·	2.1 km	MPC · JPL
416799	2005 GV_{110}	—	April 10, 2005	Kitt Peak	Spacewatch	·	1.2 km	MPC · JPL
416800	2005 GD_{113}	—	April 6, 2005	Catalina	CSS	·	4.3 km	MPC · JPL

== 416801–416900 ==
back to top

Designation			Discovery			Properties		Ref
Permanent	Provisional	Named after	Date	Site	Discoverer(s)	Category	Diam.	Ref
416801	2005 GC_{120}	—	April 12, 2005	Catalina	CSS	APO · PHA	910 m	MPC · JPL
416802	2005 GS_{124}	—	April 9, 2005	Catalina	CSS	·	5.3 km	MPC · JPL
416803	2005 GZ_{127}	—	April 9, 2005	Socorro	LINEAR	·	800 m	MPC · JPL
416804	2005 GP_{128}	—	March 9, 2005	Mount Lemmon	Mount Lemmon Survey	AMO	650 m	MPC · JPL
416805	2005 GB_{140}	—	April 12, 2005	Mount Lemmon	Mount Lemmon Survey	·	4.0 km	MPC · JPL
416806	2005 GB_{144}	—	April 10, 2005	Kitt Peak	Spacewatch	H	520 m	MPC · JPL
416807	2005 GT_{148}	—	April 11, 2005	Kitt Peak	Spacewatch	·	2.9 km	MPC · JPL
416808	2005 GR_{157}	—	April 11, 2005	Mount Lemmon	Mount Lemmon Survey	NYS	1.2 km	MPC · JPL
416809	2005 GR_{161}	—	April 4, 2005	Catalina	CSS	·	1.1 km	MPC · JPL
416810	2005 GF_{165}	—	March 9, 2005	Mount Lemmon	Mount Lemmon Survey	·	970 m	MPC · JPL
416811	2005 GL_{165}	—	March 11, 2005	Mount Lemmon	Mount Lemmon Survey	·	3.0 km	MPC · JPL
416812	2005 GW_{178}	—	April 15, 2005	Siding Spring	SSS	·	4.6 km	MPC · JPL
416813	2005 GG_{179}	—	April 13, 2005	Catalina	CSS	·	4.1 km	MPC · JPL
416814	2005 GP_{200}	—	March 4, 2005	Mount Lemmon	Mount Lemmon Survey	·	2.2 km	MPC · JPL
416815	2005 GZ_{201}	—	March 4, 2005	Mount Lemmon	Mount Lemmon Survey	·	1.5 km	MPC · JPL
416816	2005 GF_{202}	—	April 5, 2005	Mount Lemmon	Mount Lemmon Survey	V	650 m	MPC · JPL
416817	2005 GH_{215}	—	April 4, 2005	Mount Lemmon	Mount Lemmon Survey	·	3.1 km	MPC · JPL
416818	2005 GJ_{215}	—	April 8, 2005	Socorro	LINEAR	·	990 m	MPC · JPL
416819	2005 GW_{225}	—	April 1, 2005	Kitt Peak	Spacewatch	·	3.1 km	MPC · JPL
416820	2005 GP_{227}	—	April 15, 2005	Catalina	CSS	·	3.9 km	MPC · JPL
416821	2005 HT_{4}	—	April 30, 2005	Kitt Peak	Spacewatch	·	3.8 km	MPC · JPL
416822	2005 HQ_{6}	—	April 17, 2005	Catalina	CSS	H	720 m	MPC · JPL
416823	2005 HJ_{9}	—	April 17, 2005	Kitt Peak	Spacewatch	·	1.5 km	MPC · JPL
416824	2005 JW_{17}	—	May 4, 2005	Mount Lemmon	Mount Lemmon Survey	·	780 m	MPC · JPL
416825	2005 JE_{32}	—	May 4, 2005	Socorro	LINEAR	·	5.1 km	MPC · JPL
416826	2005 JK_{34}	—	May 4, 2005	Kitt Peak	Spacewatch	PHO	950 m	MPC · JPL
416827	2005 JU_{45}	—	May 3, 2005	Kitt Peak	D. E. Trilling, A. S. Rivkin	H	650 m	MPC · JPL
416828	2005 JK_{60}	—	May 8, 2005	Kitt Peak	Spacewatch	·	1.3 km	MPC · JPL
416829	2005 JU_{75}	—	May 9, 2005	Anderson Mesa	LONEOS	·	4.7 km	MPC · JPL
416830	2005 JE_{82}	—	May 12, 2005	Mayhill	Lowe, A.	·	2.5 km	MPC · JPL
416831	2005 JH_{100}	—	May 9, 2005	Kitt Peak	Spacewatch	PHO	1.9 km	MPC · JPL
416832	2005 JJ_{100}	—	April 30, 2005	Kitt Peak	Spacewatch	EOS	2.3 km	MPC · JPL
416833	2005 JT_{101}	—	May 9, 2005	Kitt Peak	Spacewatch	PHO	1.1 km	MPC · JPL
416834	2005 JY_{108}	—	May 6, 2005	Kitt Peak	Deep Lens Survey	·	2.8 km	MPC · JPL
416835	2005 JA_{109}	—	May 6, 2005	Kitt Peak	Deep Lens Survey	T_{j} (2.99)	5.4 km	MPC · JPL
416836	2005 JK_{111}	—	May 9, 2005	Anderson Mesa	LONEOS	·	4.8 km	MPC · JPL
416837	2005 JU_{134}	—	May 14, 2005	Mount Lemmon	Mount Lemmon Survey	·	1.2 km	MPC · JPL
416838	2005 JQ_{147}	—	May 15, 2005	Palomar	NEAT	·	1.8 km	MPC · JPL
416839	2005 JD_{150}	—	May 3, 2005	Kitt Peak	Spacewatch	·	1.0 km	MPC · JPL
416840	2005 JA_{164}	—	May 9, 2005	Kitt Peak	Spacewatch	·	3.5 km	MPC · JPL
416841	2005 LZ_{8}	—	June 1, 2005	Mount Lemmon	Mount Lemmon Survey	·	1.3 km	MPC · JPL
416842	2005 LD_{10}	—	May 18, 2005	Palomar	NEAT	·	1.6 km	MPC · JPL
416843	2005 LA_{20}	—	June 11, 2005	Mayhill	Lowe, A.	·	1.2 km	MPC · JPL
416844	2005 LU_{21}	—	June 6, 2005	Kitt Peak	Spacewatch	·	1.4 km	MPC · JPL
416845	2005 LQ_{23}	—	May 11, 2005	Mount Lemmon	Mount Lemmon Survey	·	3.3 km	MPC · JPL
416846	2005 LM_{27}	—	April 30, 2005	Kitt Peak	Spacewatch	·	1.2 km	MPC · JPL
416847	2005 LX_{39}	—	May 15, 2005	Mount Lemmon	Mount Lemmon Survey	·	1.5 km	MPC · JPL
416848	2005 LJ_{52}	—	June 2, 2005	Siding Spring	SSS	H	610 m	MPC · JPL
416849	2005 MO_{3}	—	June 24, 2005	Palomar	NEAT	EUN	1.2 km	MPC · JPL
416850	2005 MN_{6}	—	June 16, 2005	Mount Lemmon	Mount Lemmon Survey	·	1.4 km	MPC · JPL
416851	2005 MM_{13}	—	June 29, 2005	Palomar	NEAT	AMO	590 m	MPC · JPL
416852	2005 MQ_{15}	—	June 1, 2005	Socorro	LINEAR	H	620 m	MPC · JPL
416853	2005 MV_{16}	—	June 27, 2005	Kitt Peak	Spacewatch	·	1.4 km	MPC · JPL
416854	2005 MW_{16}	—	June 27, 2005	Kitt Peak	Spacewatch	RAF	890 m	MPC · JPL
416855	2005 MX_{17}	—	June 27, 2005	Kitt Peak	Spacewatch	·	1.4 km	MPC · JPL
416856	2005 MO_{23}	—	June 24, 2005	Palomar	NEAT	H	640 m	MPC · JPL
416857	2005 NH_{14}	—	July 5, 2005	Kitt Peak	Spacewatch	3:2 · SHU	5.0 km	MPC · JPL
416858	2005 NO_{14}	—	July 5, 2005	Mount Lemmon	Mount Lemmon Survey	ERI	1.6 km	MPC · JPL
416859	2005 NJ_{18}	—	July 4, 2005	Mount Lemmon	Mount Lemmon Survey	·	1.1 km	MPC · JPL
416860	2005 NK_{25}	—	July 4, 2005	Kitt Peak	Spacewatch	·	1.4 km	MPC · JPL
416861	2005 ND_{37}	—	July 6, 2005	Kitt Peak	Spacewatch	T_{j} (2.98) · 3:2	4.5 km	MPC · JPL
416862	2005 NC_{68}	—	June 15, 2005	Mount Lemmon	Mount Lemmon Survey	T_{j} (2.96) · 3:2	4.9 km	MPC · JPL
416863	2005 NK_{68}	—	July 3, 2005	Mount Lemmon	Mount Lemmon Survey	·	1.2 km	MPC · JPL
416864	2005 NV_{68}	—	July 3, 2005	Mount Lemmon	Mount Lemmon Survey	·	1.3 km	MPC · JPL
416865	2005 ND_{88}	—	July 4, 2005	Kitt Peak	Spacewatch	H	600 m	MPC · JPL
416866	2005 NX_{92}	—	July 5, 2005	Kitt Peak	Spacewatch	·	1.2 km	MPC · JPL
416867	2005 NG_{95}	—	July 6, 2005	Campo Imperatore	CINEOS	·	4.7 km	MPC · JPL
416868	2005 NE_{101}	—	July 11, 2005	Catalina	CSS	H	730 m	MPC · JPL
416869	2005 OB_{1}	—	July 19, 2005	Palomar	NEAT	JUN	1.1 km	MPC · JPL
416870	2005 OO_{7}	—	July 18, 2005	Palomar	NEAT	·	1.6 km	MPC · JPL
416871	2005 OJ_{17}	—	July 30, 2005	Palomar	NEAT	·	1.7 km	MPC · JPL
416872	2005 OK_{26}	—	July 29, 2005	Anderson Mesa	LONEOS	EUN	1.3 km	MPC · JPL
416873	2005 OR_{27}	—	July 26, 2005	Palomar	NEAT	MAR	1.5 km	MPC · JPL
416874	2005 PW_{19}	—	July 28, 2005	Palomar	NEAT	·	1.4 km	MPC · JPL
416875	2005 PE_{29}	—	August 27, 2005	Palomar	NEAT	·	1.5 km	MPC · JPL
416876	2005 QM	—	June 17, 2005	Mount Lemmon	Mount Lemmon Survey	·	1.9 km	MPC · JPL
416877	2005 QR_{21}	—	August 1, 2005	Siding Spring	SSS	·	1.7 km	MPC · JPL
416878	2005 QA_{30}	—	August 3, 2005	Socorro	LINEAR	·	2.5 km	MPC · JPL
416879	2005 QZ_{31}	—	August 24, 2005	Palomar	NEAT	ADE	1.7 km	MPC · JPL
416880	2005 QH_{46}	—	August 26, 2005	Palomar	NEAT	·	1.1 km	MPC · JPL
416881	2005 QO_{55}	—	August 28, 2005	Kitt Peak	Spacewatch	·	1.5 km	MPC · JPL
416882	2005 QO_{56}	—	August 23, 2005	Haleakala	NEAT	·	1.9 km	MPC · JPL
416883	2005 QZ_{62}	—	August 26, 2005	Palomar	NEAT	(5)	1.4 km	MPC · JPL
416884	2005 QF_{66}	—	August 27, 2005	Anderson Mesa	LONEOS	·	1.9 km	MPC · JPL
416885	2005 QC_{67}	—	August 28, 2005	Anderson Mesa	LONEOS	·	1.1 km	MPC · JPL
416886	2005 QX_{82}	—	August 29, 2005	Anderson Mesa	LONEOS	·	1.3 km	MPC · JPL
416887	2005 QS_{87}	—	August 29, 2005	Socorro	LINEAR	·	1.7 km	MPC · JPL
416888	2005 QX_{100}	—	August 29, 2005	Kitt Peak	Spacewatch	V	780 m	MPC · JPL
416889	2005 QG_{116}	—	August 28, 2005	Kitt Peak	Spacewatch	3:2	4.6 km	MPC · JPL
416890	2005 QY_{125}	—	August 28, 2005	Kitt Peak	Spacewatch	·	1.3 km	MPC · JPL
416891	2005 QK_{129}	—	August 28, 2005	Kitt Peak	Spacewatch	·	1.6 km	MPC · JPL
416892	2005 QL_{130}	—	August 28, 2005	Kitt Peak	Spacewatch	·	1.6 km	MPC · JPL
416893	2005 QU_{144}	—	August 27, 2005	Palomar	NEAT	·	1.4 km	MPC · JPL
416894	2005 QB_{150}	—	August 27, 2005	Kitt Peak	Spacewatch	·	1.5 km	MPC · JPL
416895	2005 QF_{150}	—	August 27, 2005	Palomar	NEAT	·	2.0 km	MPC · JPL
416896	2005 QM_{156}	—	August 30, 2005	Palomar	NEAT	·	1.4 km	MPC · JPL
416897	2005 QN_{156}	—	August 30, 2005	Palomar	NEAT	JUN	1.2 km	MPC · JPL
416898	2005 QU_{166}	—	August 26, 2005	Anderson Mesa	LONEOS	·	1.4 km	MPC · JPL
416899	2005 QB_{170}	—	August 29, 2005	Palomar	NEAT	JUN	1.2 km	MPC · JPL
416900	2005 QG_{171}	—	August 31, 2005	Socorro	LINEAR	·	1.8 km	MPC · JPL

== 416901–417000 ==
back to top

Designation			Discovery			Properties		Ref
Permanent	Provisional	Named after	Date	Site	Discoverer(s)	Category	Diam.	Ref
416901	2005 QB_{172}	—	September 1, 2005	Kitt Peak	Spacewatch	·	1.3 km	MPC · JPL
416902	2005 QG_{179}	—	August 25, 2005	Palomar	NEAT	·	1.2 km	MPC · JPL
416903	2005 QQ_{189}	—	August 28, 2005	Kitt Peak	Spacewatch	·	2.0 km	MPC · JPL
416904	2005 QL_{190}	—	August 31, 2005	Kitt Peak	Spacewatch	·	1.8 km	MPC · JPL
416905	2005 RK_{7}	—	August 25, 2005	Palomar	NEAT	·	1.8 km	MPC · JPL
416906	2005 RH_{9}	—	September 2, 2005	Palomar	NEAT	JUN	1.3 km	MPC · JPL
416907	2005 RY_{9}	—	September 10, 2005	Anderson Mesa	LONEOS	·	1.4 km	MPC · JPL
416908	2005 RP_{28}	—	August 31, 2005	Kitt Peak	Spacewatch	·	1.4 km	MPC · JPL
416909	2005 RN_{29}	—	September 12, 2005	Anderson Mesa	LONEOS	·	2.3 km	MPC · JPL
416910	2005 RV_{43}	—	September 3, 2005	Catalina	CSS	·	1.6 km	MPC · JPL
416911	2005 RL_{44}	—	September 13, 2005	Socorro	LINEAR	·	1.5 km	MPC · JPL
416912	2005 RA_{48}	—	September 14, 2005	Apache Point	A. C. Becker	·	1.4 km	MPC · JPL
416913	2005 RB_{48}	—	September 14, 2005	Apache Point	A. C. Becker	·	1.5 km	MPC · JPL
416914	2005 RH_{48}	—	September 1, 2005	Palomar	NEAT	ADE	2.4 km	MPC · JPL
416915	2005 SH_{1}	—	September 23, 2005	Kitt Peak	Spacewatch	·	1.8 km	MPC · JPL
416916	2005 SH_{15}	—	September 26, 2005	Kitt Peak	Spacewatch	·	1.4 km	MPC · JPL
416917	2005 SV_{31}	—	September 23, 2005	Kitt Peak	Spacewatch	·	1.5 km	MPC · JPL
416918	2005 SA_{39}	—	September 24, 2005	Kitt Peak	Spacewatch	·	1.4 km	MPC · JPL
416919	2005 SS_{45}	—	September 24, 2005	Kitt Peak	Spacewatch	·	1.5 km	MPC · JPL
416920	2005 SN_{49}	—	September 24, 2005	Kitt Peak	Spacewatch	·	1.1 km	MPC · JPL
416921	2005 SF_{51}	—	September 24, 2005	Kitt Peak	Spacewatch	(17392)	1.4 km	MPC · JPL
416922	2005 SY_{51}	—	September 24, 2005	Kitt Peak	Spacewatch	·	1.8 km	MPC · JPL
416923	2005 ST_{53}	—	September 25, 2005	Kitt Peak	Spacewatch	·	1.6 km	MPC · JPL
416924	2005 SD_{54}	—	September 25, 2005	Kitt Peak	Spacewatch	·	1.6 km	MPC · JPL
416925	2005 SN_{60}	—	September 26, 2005	Palomar	NEAT	·	1.7 km	MPC · JPL
416926	2005 SV_{62}	—	September 26, 2005	Kitt Peak	Spacewatch	·	1.2 km	MPC · JPL
416927	2005 SY_{72}	—	September 23, 2005	Catalina	CSS	·	1.8 km	MPC · JPL
416928	2005 ST_{75}	—	September 24, 2005	Kitt Peak	Spacewatch	WIT	790 m	MPC · JPL
416929	2005 SZ_{80}	—	September 24, 2005	Kitt Peak	Spacewatch	·	1.2 km	MPC · JPL
416930	2005 SV_{84}	—	September 24, 2005	Kitt Peak	Spacewatch	·	2.1 km	MPC · JPL
416931	2005 SY_{86}	—	September 24, 2005	Kitt Peak	Spacewatch	EUN	1.2 km	MPC · JPL
416932	2005 SM_{87}	—	September 24, 2005	Kitt Peak	Spacewatch	·	1.5 km	MPC · JPL
416933	2005 SY_{104}	—	September 25, 2005	Palomar	NEAT	JUN	1.2 km	MPC · JPL
416934	2005 SC_{106}	—	September 25, 2005	Kitt Peak	Spacewatch	·	2.0 km	MPC · JPL
416935	2005 SG_{111}	—	September 26, 2005	Kitt Peak	Spacewatch	·	2.2 km	MPC · JPL
416936	2005 SY_{112}	—	September 26, 2005	Palomar	NEAT	·	1.4 km	MPC · JPL
416937	2005 SJ_{113}	—	September 27, 2005	Kitt Peak	Spacewatch	EUN	1.2 km	MPC · JPL
416938	2005 SB_{119}	—	September 28, 2005	Palomar	NEAT	·	1.7 km	MPC · JPL
416939	2005 SA_{120}	—	September 29, 2005	Kitt Peak	Spacewatch	·	1.4 km	MPC · JPL
416940	2005 SY_{121}	—	September 23, 2005	Kitt Peak	Spacewatch	·	1.5 km	MPC · JPL
416941	2005 SH_{132}	—	September 29, 2005	Catalina	CSS	·	2.3 km	MPC · JPL
416942	2005 SW_{132}	—	September 29, 2005	Kitt Peak	Spacewatch	·	1.6 km	MPC · JPL
416943	2005 SM_{135}	—	September 24, 2005	Kitt Peak	Spacewatch	·	1.4 km	MPC · JPL
416944	2005 SY_{138}	—	September 25, 2005	Kitt Peak	Spacewatch	·	1.6 km	MPC · JPL
416945	2005 SR_{142}	—	September 25, 2005	Kitt Peak	Spacewatch	·	1.8 km	MPC · JPL
416946	2005 SU_{146}	—	September 25, 2005	Kitt Peak	Spacewatch	·	1.4 km	MPC · JPL
416947	2005 SD_{156}	—	September 26, 2005	Palomar	NEAT	MAR	1.4 km	MPC · JPL
416948	2005 SG_{164}	—	September 27, 2005	Palomar	NEAT	·	1.6 km	MPC · JPL
416949	2005 SK_{165}	—	September 28, 2005	Palomar	NEAT	·	1.8 km	MPC · JPL
416950	2005 SR_{182}	—	September 29, 2005	Kitt Peak	Spacewatch	WIT	1.0 km	MPC · JPL
416951	2005 SE_{187}	—	September 29, 2005	Kitt Peak	Spacewatch	·	2.3 km	MPC · JPL
416952	2005 SZ_{187}	—	September 29, 2005	Mount Lemmon	Mount Lemmon Survey	3:2 · SHU	4.8 km	MPC · JPL
416953	2005 SE_{196}	—	September 30, 2005	Kitt Peak	Spacewatch	·	1.2 km	MPC · JPL
416954	2005 SD_{197}	—	September 30, 2005	Kitt Peak	Spacewatch	·	1.2 km	MPC · JPL
416955	2005 SK_{198}	—	September 30, 2005	Palomar	NEAT	·	1.6 km	MPC · JPL
416956	2005 SB_{200}	—	September 30, 2005	Kitt Peak	Spacewatch	·	1.4 km	MPC · JPL
416957	2005 SG_{202}	—	September 30, 2005	Mount Lemmon	Mount Lemmon Survey	·	1.5 km	MPC · JPL
416958	2005 SD_{212}	—	September 30, 2005	Mount Lemmon	Mount Lemmon Survey	·	1.4 km	MPC · JPL
416959	2005 SD_{214}	—	June 11, 2005	Catalina	CSS	·	2.8 km	MPC · JPL
416960	2005 SJ_{214}	—	September 30, 2005	Anderson Mesa	LONEOS	·	2.2 km	MPC · JPL
416961	2005 SC_{220}	—	September 29, 2005	Catalina	CSS	·	1.8 km	MPC · JPL
416962	2005 ST_{222}	—	September 30, 2005	Catalina	CSS	MAR	1.5 km	MPC · JPL
416963	2005 SV_{222}	—	September 30, 2005	Anderson Mesa	LONEOS	·	1.3 km	MPC · JPL
416964	2005 SG_{252}	—	August 25, 2005	Palomar	NEAT	·	1.4 km	MPC · JPL
416965	2005 SR_{272}	—	September 30, 2005	Palomar	NEAT	EUN	1.2 km	MPC · JPL
416966	2005 SX_{277}	—	September 30, 2005	Mauna Kea	Mauna Kea	·	2.7 km	MPC · JPL
416967	2005 SU_{292}	—	March 26, 2004	Kitt Peak	Spacewatch	·	1.7 km	MPC · JPL
416968	2005 TP_{1}	—	October 1, 2005	Socorro	LINEAR	ADE	2.1 km	MPC · JPL
416969	2005 TZ_{1}	—	October 1, 2005	Mount Lemmon	Mount Lemmon Survey	·	1.9 km	MPC · JPL
416970	2005 TN_{7}	—	September 3, 2005	Palomar	NEAT	·	1.6 km	MPC · JPL
416971	2005 TW_{8}	—	October 1, 2005	Kitt Peak	Spacewatch	·	1.4 km	MPC · JPL
416972	2005 TN_{19}	—	October 1, 2005	Mount Lemmon	Mount Lemmon Survey	JUN	1.1 km	MPC · JPL
416973	2005 TR_{21}	—	October 1, 2005	Kitt Peak	Spacewatch	(5)	1.0 km	MPC · JPL
416974	2005 TR_{28}	—	October 2, 2005	Palomar	NEAT	EUN	1.1 km	MPC · JPL
416975	2005 TF_{37}	—	October 1, 2005	Mount Lemmon	Mount Lemmon Survey	(7744)	1.1 km	MPC · JPL
416976	2005 TV_{46}	—	October 3, 2005	Kitt Peak	Spacewatch	·	1.5 km	MPC · JPL
416977	2005 TF_{48}	—	October 6, 2005	Catalina	CSS	MAR	1.1 km	MPC · JPL
416978	2005 TF_{58}	—	October 1, 2005	Mount Lemmon	Mount Lemmon Survey	·	2.3 km	MPC · JPL
416979	2005 TT_{65}	—	October 1, 2005	Mount Lemmon	Mount Lemmon Survey	·	1.5 km	MPC · JPL
416980	2005 TD_{77}	—	October 6, 2005	Anderson Mesa	LONEOS	·	1.4 km	MPC · JPL
416981	2005 TG_{83}	—	October 3, 2005	Socorro	LINEAR	·	2.3 km	MPC · JPL
416982	2005 TU_{83}	—	September 24, 2005	Kitt Peak	Spacewatch	·	1.4 km	MPC · JPL
416983	2005 TH_{88}	—	October 5, 2005	Catalina	CSS	·	1.3 km	MPC · JPL
416984	2005 TK_{94}	—	October 6, 2005	Kitt Peak	Spacewatch	·	1.3 km	MPC · JPL
416985	2005 TD_{103}	—	September 29, 2005	Mount Lemmon	Mount Lemmon Survey	NEM	1.9 km	MPC · JPL
416986	2005 TO_{107}	—	October 5, 2005	Kitt Peak	Spacewatch	·	2.8 km	MPC · JPL
416987	2005 TM_{119}	—	September 30, 2005	Mount Lemmon	Mount Lemmon Survey	·	1.8 km	MPC · JPL
416988	2005 TB_{126}	—	September 29, 2005	Mount Lemmon	Mount Lemmon Survey	·	2.0 km	MPC · JPL
416989	2005 TV_{140}	—	October 8, 2005	Kitt Peak	Spacewatch	·	1.1 km	MPC · JPL
416990	2005 TS_{141}	—	October 8, 2005	Kitt Peak	Spacewatch	·	1.8 km	MPC · JPL
416991	2005 TG_{144}	—	October 8, 2005	Kitt Peak	Spacewatch	·	1.3 km	MPC · JPL
416992	2005 TJ_{149}	—	September 29, 2005	Kitt Peak	Spacewatch	·	1.6 km	MPC · JPL
416993	2005 TO_{152}	—	October 11, 2005	Kitt Peak	Spacewatch	·	2.0 km	MPC · JPL
416994	2005 TS_{155}	—	September 29, 2005	Kitt Peak	Spacewatch	·	1.9 km	MPC · JPL
416995	2005 TP_{157}	—	October 9, 2005	Kitt Peak	Spacewatch	·	1.4 km	MPC · JPL
416996	2005 TY_{157}	—	September 24, 2005	Kitt Peak	Spacewatch	·	1.3 km	MPC · JPL
416997	2005 TV_{162}	—	October 9, 2005	Kitt Peak	Spacewatch	·	1.7 km	MPC · JPL
416998	2005 TS_{163}	—	October 9, 2005	Kitt Peak	Spacewatch	·	1.6 km	MPC · JPL
416999	2005 TO_{165}	—	October 9, 2005	Kitt Peak	Spacewatch	MIS	2.2 km	MPC · JPL
417000	2005 TH_{177}	—	September 1, 2005	Palomar	NEAT	·	1.4 km	MPC · JPL

back to top

== Meaning of names ==
As minor planet discoveries are confirmed, they are given a permanent number by the IAU's Minor Planet Center (MPC), and the discoverers can then submit names for them, following the IAU's naming conventions. The list below concerns those minor planets in the specified number-range that have received names, and explains the meanings of those names.

Official naming citations of newly named small Solar System bodies are approved and published in a bulletin by IAU's Working Group for Small Bodies Nomenclature (WGSBN). Before May 2021, citations were published in MPC's Minor Planet Circulars for many decades. Recent citations can also be found on the JPL Small-Body Database (SBDB). Until his death in 2016, German astronomer Lutz D. Schmadel compiled these citations into the Dictionary of Minor Planet Names (DMP) and regularly updated the collection.

Based on Paul Herget's The Names of the Minor Planets, Schmadel also researched the unclear origin of numerous asteroids, most of which had been named prior to World War II. This article incorporates text from this source, which is in the public domain: SBDB New namings may only be added to this list below after official publication as the preannouncement of names is condemned. The WGSBN publishes a comprehensive guideline for the naming rules of non-cometary small Solar System bodies.

Named minor planet	Provisional	This minor planet was named for...	Ref · Catalog
416252 Manuelherrera	2003 ES	Manuel Félix Herrera Gómez (1987–2013), a PhD student who researched trans-Neptunian objects and extrasolar planets at the Institute of Astrophysics of Andalusia, in Granada, Spain	JPL · 416252
416273 Glennsnyder	2003 GS_{28}	Glenn Snyder (1944–2017) earned his PhD in astrophysics from Case Western Reserve University in Ohio, and wrote code for NASA space missions until 1992. A programmer for a project at Gettysburg College in Pennsylvania, he developed astronomy software, including astrometric software, used by educators worldwide.	JPL · 416273
416583 Jacereece	2004 JH	Jace Danielson (born 2021) and Reece Marshall (born 2021) are great-grandchildren of American astronomer James Whitney Young, who discovered this minor planet.	IAU · 416583
