= Josefa Masegosa Gallego =

Spanish astronomer

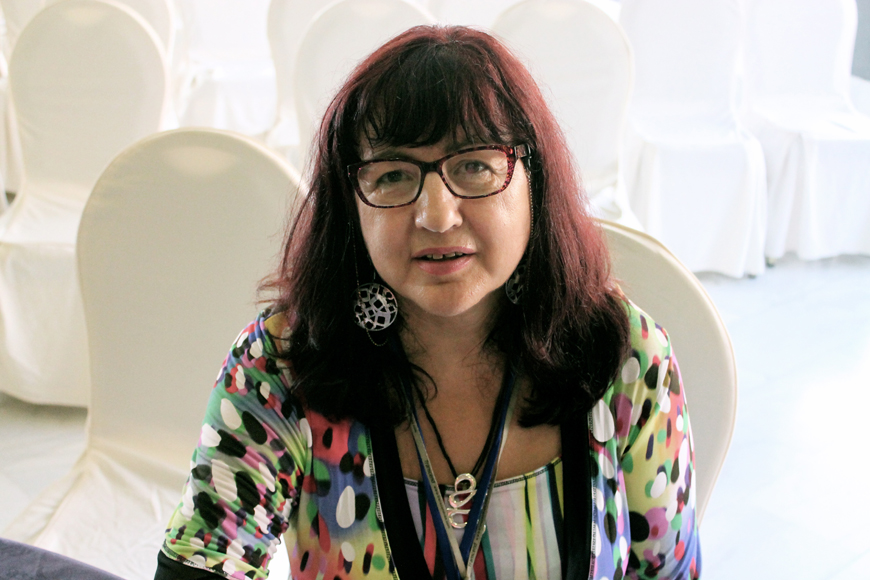
- Born: November 22, 1957 (age 67); Oria, Andalusia, Spain
- Education: University College of Almería
- Occupation: Astrophysist
- Employer: The Spanish National Research Council at the Institute of Astrophysics of Andalusia

Josefa Masegosa Gallego is a Spanish astronomer and scientific researcher. She is a winner of both the Granada, City of Science and Innovation award and the Mariana Pineda Award of Equality.

== Life ==
Gallego was born in 1957 in Oria, Spain. She has a PhD from the University of Granada.

Gallego works in the field of astrophysics. She researches science at the Spanish National Research Council at the Institute of Astrophysics of Andalusia. Her research is mainly focused on formation in intense stars and evolution, formation and nuclear activity in galaxies.

In 2018, she won the Granada, City of Science and Innovation award, and in 2022, she won the Mariana Pineda Award of Equality.
