= Instituto de Astrofísica de Andalucía =

Spanish research centre

Institute of Astrophysics of Andalusia
- Formation: 1975
- Headquarters: Granada, Spain
- Website: www.iaa.es

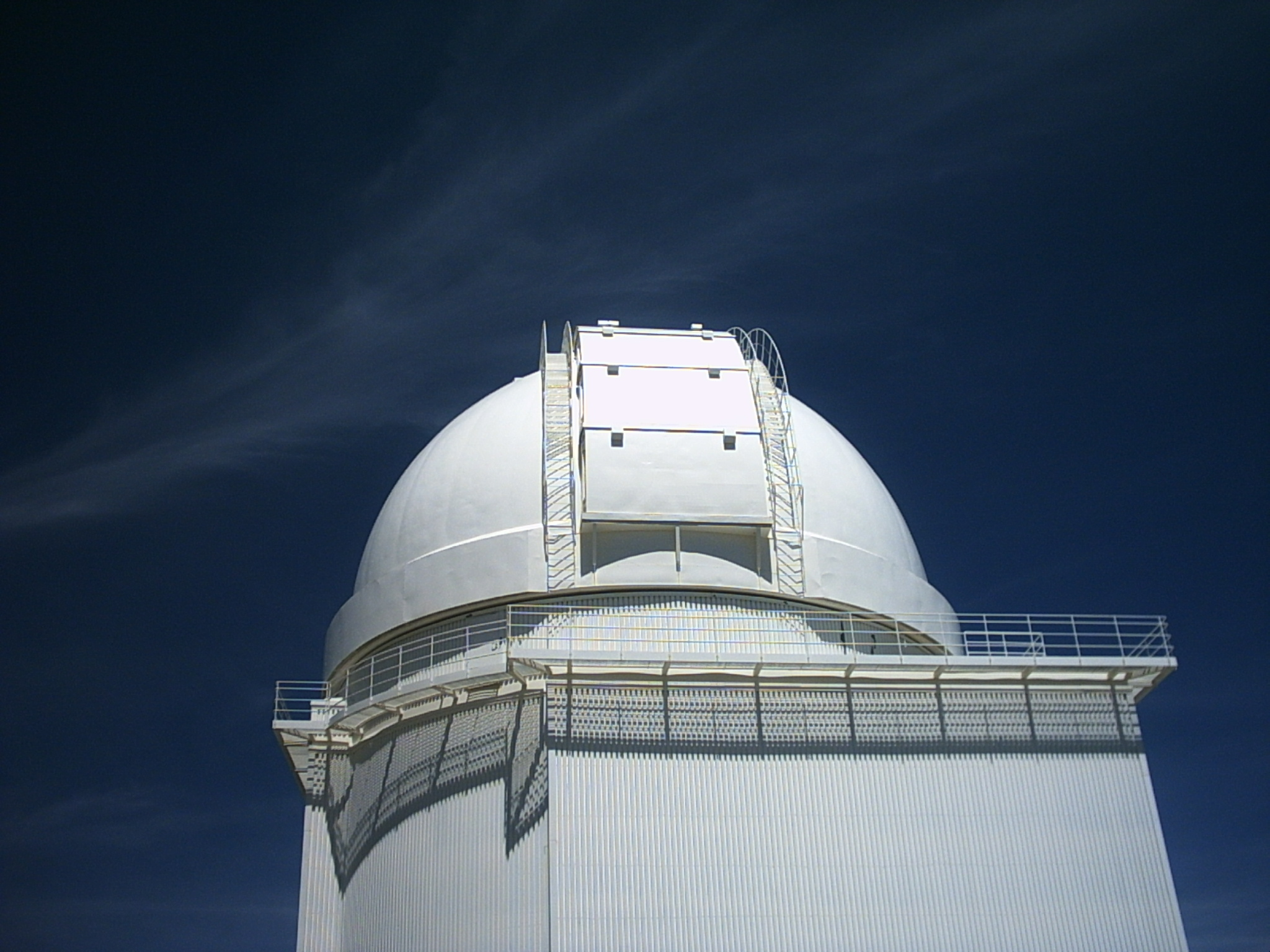
Calar Alto Observatory, Almería.

Instituto de Astrofísica de Andalucía (IAA-CSIC, 'Institute of Astrophysics of Andalusia') is a research institute funded by the Consejo Superior de Investigaciones Científicas (CSIC, 'High Council of Scientific Research') of the Spanish government, and is located in Granada, Andalusia, Spain. IAA activities are related to research in the field of astrophysics, and instrument development both for ground-based telescopes and for space missions. Scientific research at the Institute covers the Solar System, star formation, stellar structure and evolution, galaxy formation and evolution and cosmology. The IAA was created as a CSIC research institute in July 1975. Presently, the IAA operates the Sierra Nevada Observatory, and (jointly with the also the Max-Planck Institute of Heidelberg) the Calar Alto Observatory.

The Instituto de Astrofísica de Andalucía is divided in the following departments, each with an (incomplete) outline of research avenues and groups:

- Department of Extragalactic Astronomy
  - Violent Stellar Formation Group
  - AMIGA Group (Analysis of the interstellar Medium of Isolated Galaxies)
- Department of Stellar Physics
- Department of Radio Astronomy and Galactic Structure
  - Stellar Systems Group
- Department of Solar System

The technological needs of IAA's research groups are fulfilled by the Instrumental and Technological Developments Unit.

== See also ==
- BOOTES
- Instituto de Astrofísica de Canarias
- Centro de Estudios de Fisica del Cosmos de Aragon
- Josefa Masegosa Gallego, astronomer, scientific researcher
