= 2014 in science =

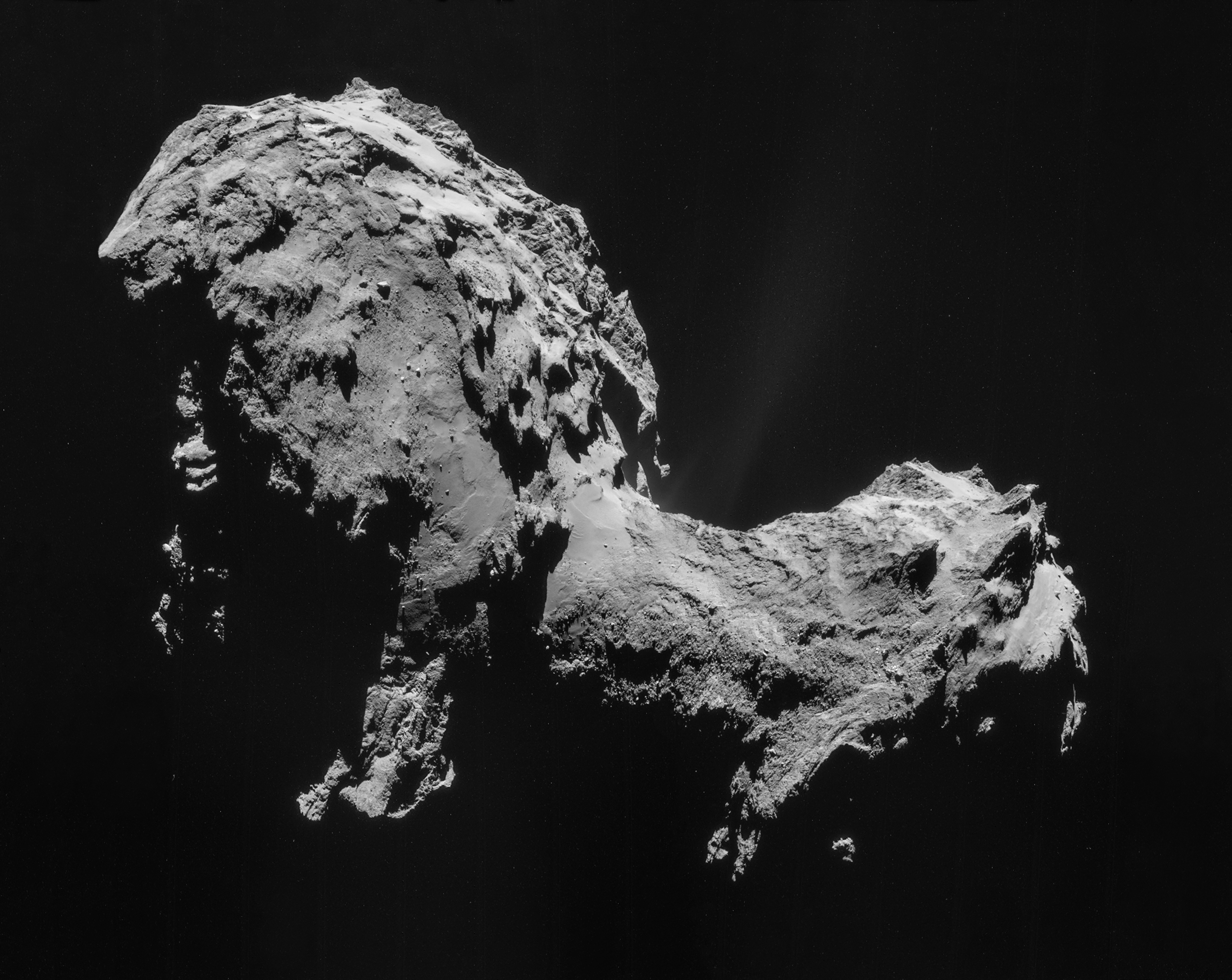
In November 2014, the Philae lander launched by the European Space Agency's Rosetta spacecraft performed the first successful landing on a comet (Philae's target, Comet 67P, pictured).

A number of significant scientific events occurred in 2014, including the first robotic landing on a comet and the first complete stem-cell-assisted recovery from paraplegia. The year also saw a significant expansion in the worldwide use and sophistication of technologies such as unmanned aerial vehicles and wearable electronics.

The United Nations declared 2014 the International Year of Family Farming and Crystallography.

== Events, discoveries and inventions ==
=== January ===
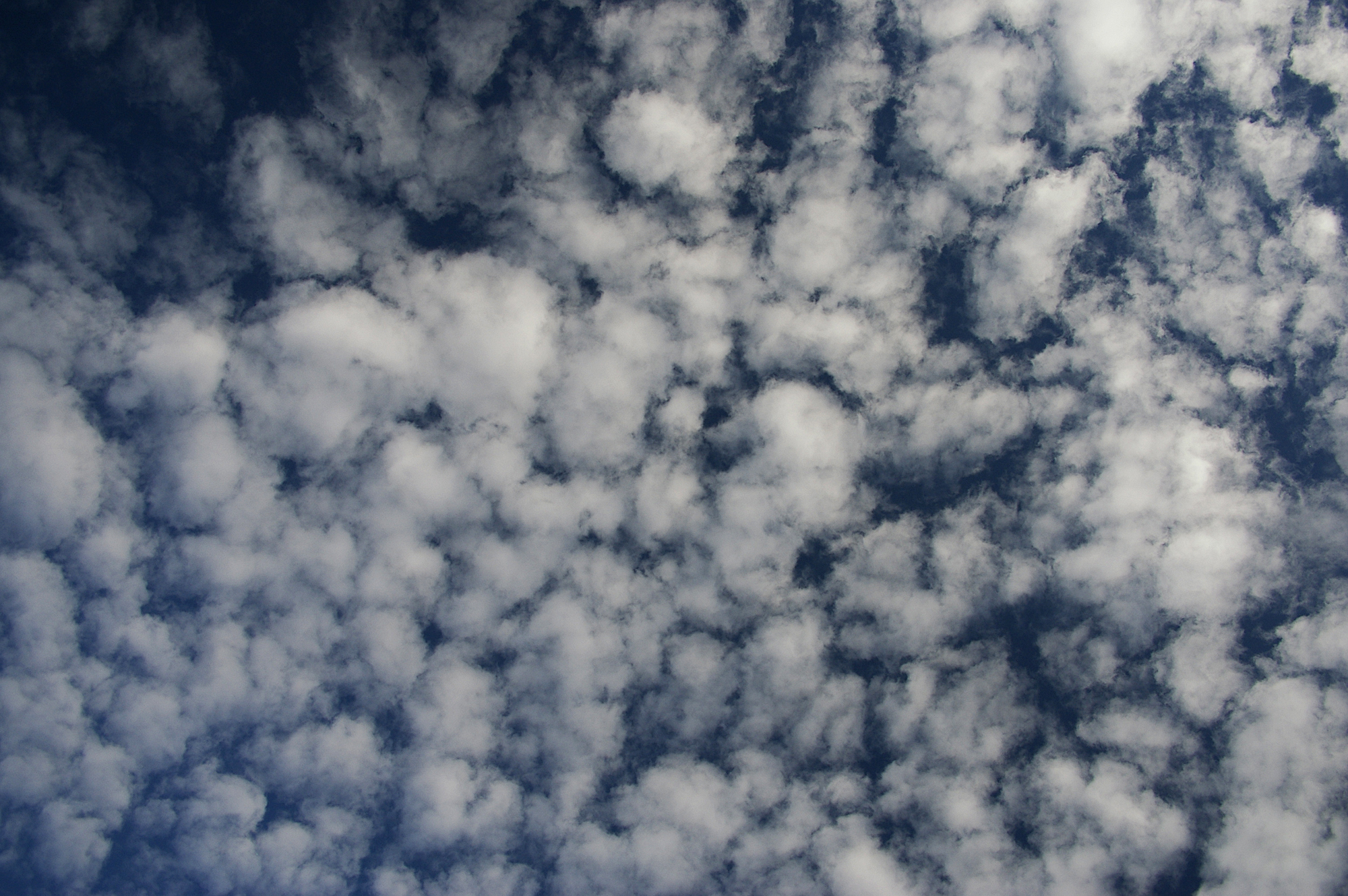
1 January 2014: New computer models show that climate change is more sensitive to the effects of cloud formation than previously thought.

- 1 January – A study published in Nature shows that the role of cloud formation in climate change has been underestimated. As a result, global temperatures could increase by 4 °C by 2100 and possibly 8 °C by 2200.
- 2 January
  - Researchers have shown in precise detail how a molecular defect is responsible for myotonic dystrophy type 2, then designed a potential drug candidate to reverse the disease.
  - The asteroid 2014 AA impacts the Earth a few hours after it was first sighted. This was the second time an asteroid was observed before it impacted with Earth (the first being 2008 TC3).
- 5 January – A launch of the communication satellite GSAT-14 from the Satish Dhawan Space Centre aboard the GSLV Mk.II D5 marks the first successful flight of an Indian cryogenic rocket engine, the CE-7.5.
- 6 January – A new way to destroy metastasizing cancer cells traveling through the bloodstream has been discovered by researchers at Cornell University.
- 7 January – NASA releases the deepest image ever taken of a galaxy cluster not long after the Big Bang. The image includes Abell 2744, a galaxy cluster in the constellation Sculptor, and was taken by the Hubble Space Telescope.
- 8 January
  - Using the Sloan Digital Telescope, astronomers have measured the distance to galaxies six billion light-years away – about halfway back to the Big Bang – to an accuracy of just 1 percent. This could aid in the understanding of dark energy, which is thought to be driving the expansion of the universe.
  - A detailed survey of lion populations has revealed that in West Africa, their numbers have collapsed with less than 250 adults remaining.
- 13 January
  - New analysis of a Tiktaalik roseae fossil, dating back 375 million years, has revealed a key link in the evolution of hind limbs that challenges existing theories on how they first developed.
  - Chemists have engineered a plastic artificial cell containing organelles capable of producing the various steps in a chemical reaction.
- 14 January
  - A giant trench deeper than the Grand Canyon has been discovered under Antarctic ice.
  - Illumina, Inc. has demonstrated the first $1,000 genome.
- 16 January
  - A new gene therapy technique has restored the sight of six patients who would otherwise have gone blind.
  - Google reports the development of a contact lens glucose monitor.
  - China's Yutu rover completes its first examination of the lunar soil.

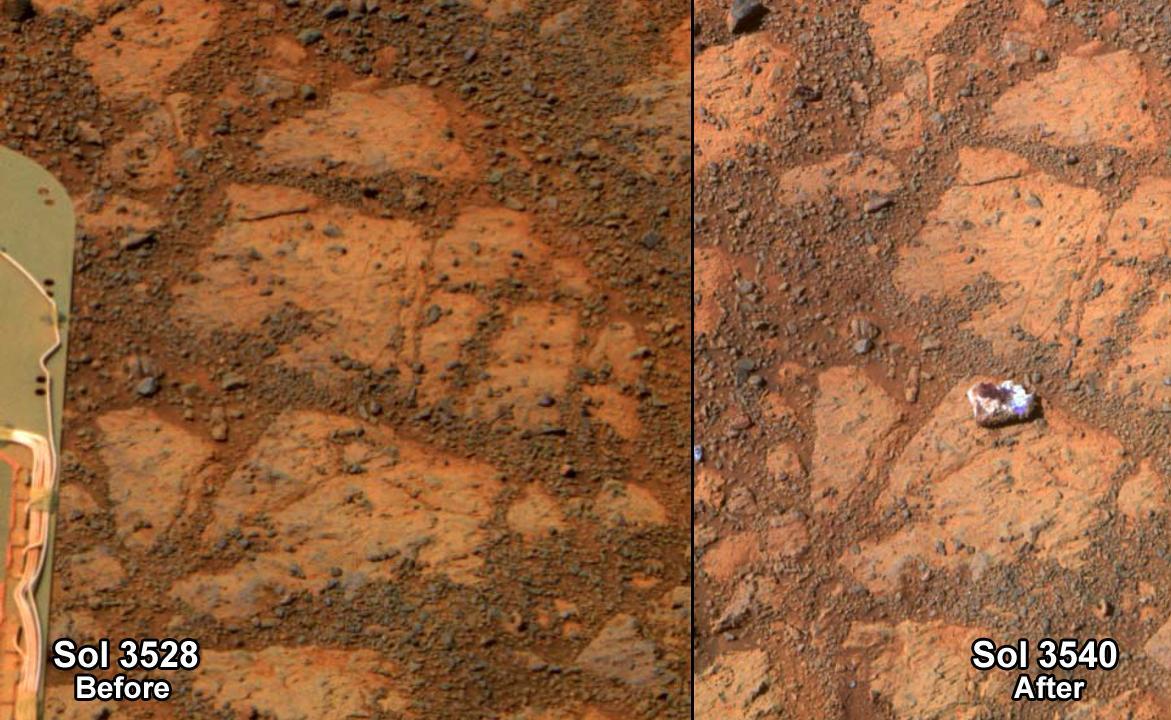
"Mystery" rock? found by the Opportunity rover on the planet Mars – comparison of images: Sol 3528 and Sol 3540 (23 January 2014) (b/w) (solution).

- 17 January – NASA reports that a Mars rock, named "Pinnacle Island", that was not in an Opportunity rover image taken on Sol 3528, "mysteriously" appeared 13 days later in a similar image taken on Sol 3540. – UPDATE (14 February 2014): "Mystery" seems to have been solved – the location where the rock was dislodged by the rover has been found. (image)
- 20 January – The ESA's Rosetta spacecraft "wakes up" from hibernation mode to monitor comet 67P/Churyumov–Gerasimenko for the next 16 months as the comet travels into, and then out of, the inner Solar System. The spacecraft is expected to deploy the Philae lander on the comet's surface in November 2014.
- 21 January
  - Globally, 2013 was tied with 2003 as the fourth warmest year on record, according to the National Oceanic and Atmospheric Administration (NOAA).
  - One quarter of the world's cartilaginous fish, namely sharks and rays, face extinction within the next few decades, according to latest research.
  - A new device created by the University of California enables real-time measurements of drug metabolism and concentration in the bloodstream, potentially improving the way doses are administered.
  - Extreme air pollution in Asia and China in particular is having a clear impact on weather and climate patterns, according to a study of aerosols and meteorology over the past 30 years.
- 22 January
  - ESA scientists report the detection, for the first definitive time, of water vapor on the dwarf planet, Ceres, largest object in the asteroid belt. The detection was made by using the far-infrared abilities of the Herschel Space Observatory. The finding is unexpected because comets, not asteroids, are typically considered to "sprout jets and plumes". According to one of the scientists, "The lines are becoming more and more blurred between comets and asteroids."
  - Researchers have determined that the earliest memories prior to the age of three will tend to disappear when a child reaches the age of seven, a phenomenon known as "childhood amnesia."
  - The leech Ozobranchus jantseanus has been shown to survive for 24 hours at −321 °F (−196 °C) and for nine months at −130 °F (−90 °C), a finding that could yield insights into cryopreservation for humans.
- 23 January – A new microscopy technique can eliminate distortion from nano-scale images.
- 24 January – NASA reports that current studies on the planet Mars by the Curiosity and Opportunity rovers will now be searching for evidence of ancient life, including a biosphere based on autotrophic, chemotrophic and/or chemolithoautotrophic microorganisms, as well as ancient water, including fluvio-lacustrine environments (plains related to ancient rivers or lakes) that may have been habitable. The search for evidence of habitability, taphonomy (related to fossils), and organic carbon on the planet Mars is now a primary NASA objective.
- 26 January – New research indicates that most of the Grand Canyon is much younger than previously thought, having formed as recently as 5 or 6 million years ago, compared to 70 million years as previously estimated.
- 27 January – Genetic analysis of a European male from 7,000 years ago has revealed he had dark skin, dark hair and blue eyes – suggesting that lighter skin colour evolved much later than was previously assumed.
- 28 January – A new study shows that living near a fracking site may increase the risk of some birth defects by as much as 30 percent. As many as 15 million Americans may live within one mile of a drilling well.
- 29 January
  - The axolotl may have gone extinct in the wild. None were found in a recent survey of its only remaining natural habitat, Lake Xochimilco.
  - Japanese researchers have reported that they developed a way of turning adult mice cells into stem cells by dipping them in acid. If true, this could pave the way for routine use of stem cells in regenerative medicine with a technique that is cheaper, faster and more efficient than before. However, other investigators could not reproduce the effect, and so this "discovery" remains controversial.

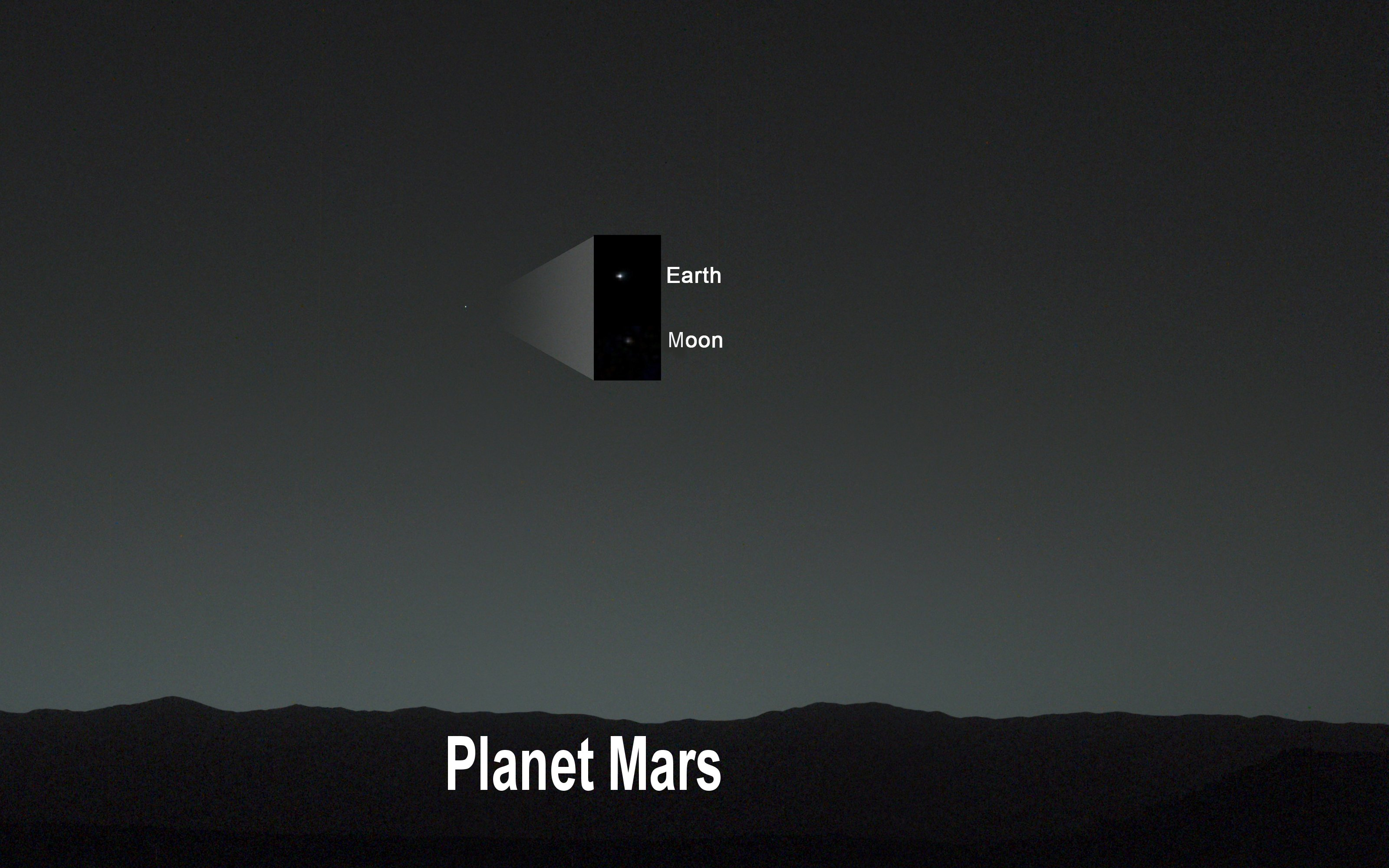
First image by the Curiosity rover of the Earth and Moon in the night sky of Mars (31 January 2014).

- 31 January
  - A new way of electrochemically converting CO_{2} – a greenhouse gas – into carbon monoxide has been developed at the University of Delaware.
  - The world's first monkeys with genes modified by CRISPR/Cas9, a new form of DNA engineering, have been created in a Chinese laboratory.
  - Despite warnings from scientists about the ecological impact, Australia's government has approved plans to dump three million cubic metres of sediment near the Great Barrier Reef, as part of the world's largest coal port.

=== February ===
- 3 February
  - By the 2080s, most former Winter Olympics venues will no longer be suitable for hosting the games due to lack of snow, according to a new study.
  - As larger mammals become extinct, rats could dominate many ecological niches and evolve to huge sizes in the future, according to an academic from the University of Leicester.
  - The first single-molecule LED has been created.
- 5 February – A Danish man has been fitted with a prosthetic hand capable of delivering a sense of touch.
- 6 February
  - NASA releases the first image by the Curiosity rover of the Earth and the Moon in the night sky of Mars.
  - NASA reports that the Mars Curiosity rover, in order to reduce wear on its wheels by avoiding rougher terrain, has successfully crossed (image) the "Dingo Gap" sand dune and is now expected to travel a smoother route to Mount Sharp.
- 7 February – Archaeologists report that human footprints, possibly from Homo antecessor, that may be as much as 1 million years old, were found at Happisburgh in eastern England, in May 2013.
- 7 February – New species of wild pepper, Piper kelleyi, is described in PhytoKeys.
- 9 February – The discovery of one of the oldest known stars in the Universe, SMSS J031300.36-670839.3, is announced.
- 10 February
  - New and more precise dating techniques indicate that the End Permian extinction event happened over the course of 60,000 years, about 10 times faster than previously thought.
  - Nanomotors have been controlled inside living cells for the first time.
- 11 February – Scientists at King's College London have identified a gene linking brain structure to intelligence.
- 12 February
  - The discovery of four new galactic clusters is announced in the Monthly Notices of the Royal Astronomical Society.
  - The first global geologic map of Ganymede, the largest moon in the Solar System, has been produced.
  - A newly discovered ichthyosaur fossil has revealed the earliest live reptile birth, dating back 248 million years. It suggests that live-bearing evolved on land and not in the sea.
- 14 February – New evidence, revealed in a study of 400 gay men, has strengthened the idea that male sexual orientation is influenced by genes.
- 17 February
  - Genetically modified potatoes capable of resisting blight have been developed by British scientists.
  - An abrupt stop to geoengineering with sulfate particle injections will make global warming even worse, according to researchers.
- 18 February – Astronomers report that asteroid 2000 EM26, a Near-Earth Asteroid (NEA) and Potentially Hazardous Asteroid (PHA), 270 m (890 ft) in diameter, safely passed by the Earth at a distance about 8.8 times further from Earth than the Moon. The event was broadcast live (YouTube archive) at 09:00pm EST (02:00 UTC, 18 February 2014) by the Slooh community observatory. (image of Earth-Asteroid orbits).
- 19 February
  - Melting sea ice in the Arctic and the resulting exposure of dark water is reducing Earth's albedo more than previously forecast, according to NASA.
  - The European Space Agency (ESA) has selected the PLAnetary Transits and Oscillations of stars (PLATO) observatory as the third medium-sized (M) mission in its Cosmic Vision programme. This will begin operation in 2024, looking for truly Earth-like planets around Sun-like stars, in sufficient detail to examine their atmospheres for signs of life.
  - German and Ukrainian scientists prepared a photoactivated peptide, antibiotic Gramicidin S analogue, antimicrobial activity of which can be reversibly switched "off" by UV light and "on" by visible light
- 20 February – The biggest ever stem cell trial involving heart attack patients has commenced in London. It will examine 3,000 patients in 11 European countries, determining whether death rates can be reduced and damaged tissues repaired after a heart attack.
- 21 February – NASA announces a greatly upgraded database for tracking polycyclic aromatic hydrocarbons (PAHs) in the universe. According to scientists, more than 20% of the carbon in the universe may be associated with PAHs, possible starting materials for the formation of life. PAHs seem to have been formed shortly after the Big Bang, are abundant in the universe, and are associated with new stars and exoplanets.
- 22 February – ISMCBBPR through their president, Isidro A. T. Savillo, announces the Molecule of the Year 2012 as Desmosterol.
- 24 February
  - Following a long delay due to technical issues, the first 128 GB microSD card has been announced, based on 16 memory dies vertically stacked, each shaved to be thinner than a strand of hair.
  - A tiny fragment of zircon dating back 4.4 billion years has been confirmed as the oldest known piece of Earth's crust. It provides evidence that a solid crust formed much earlier in the planet's history than was previously thought.
- 26 February
  - A team of researchers announce the creation of a dropleton, the first known quasiparticle that behaves like a liquid.
  - NASA has announced the discovery of 715 exoplanets by its Kepler mission, increasing the total number of confirmed planets outside the Solar System to nearly 1,700.
  - Ross Sea ice cover during the summer will decrease 56% by 2050 and 78% by 2100, according to a new computer model.

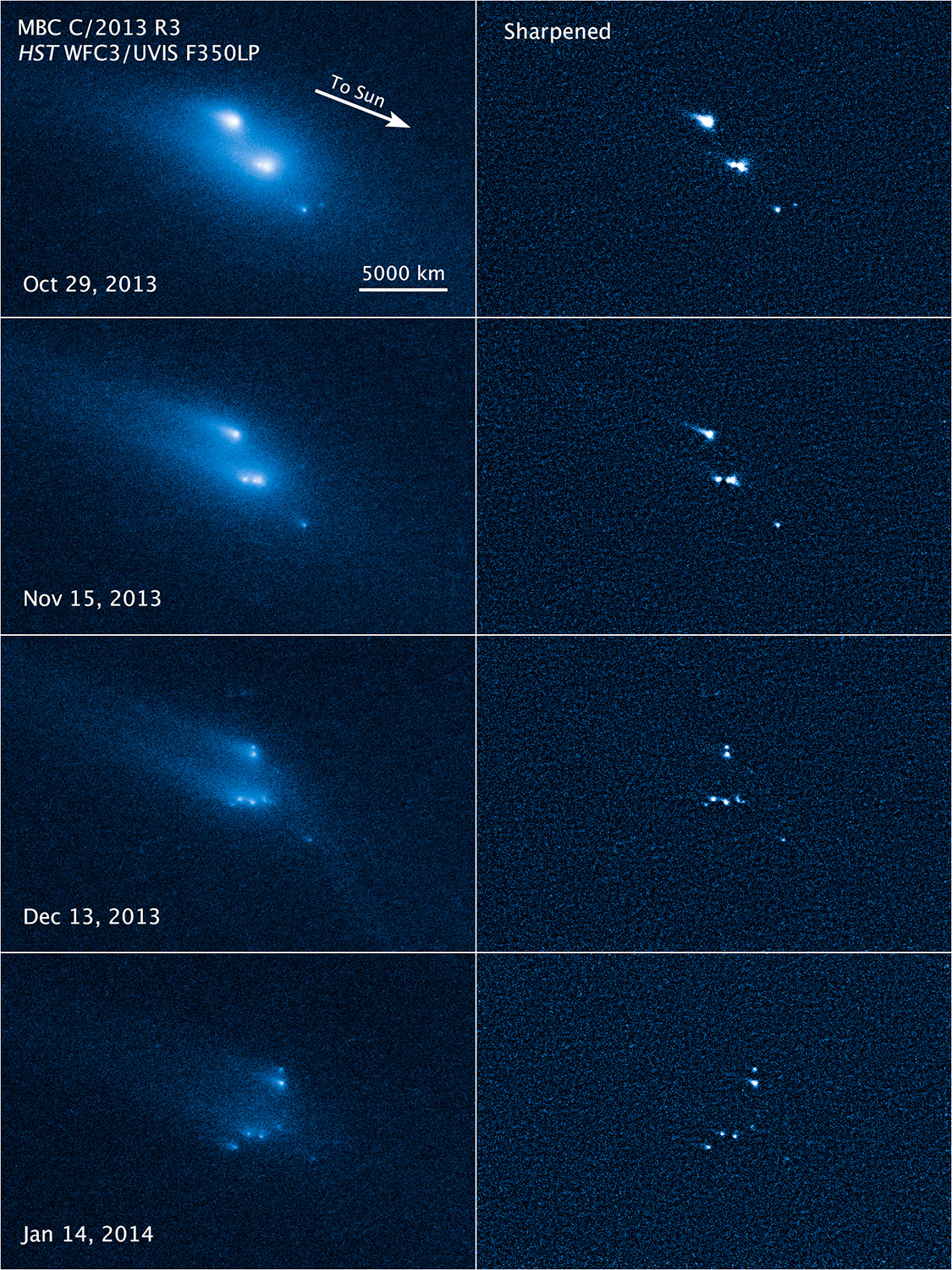
Disintegration of asteroid P/2013 R3 observed by the Hubble Space Telescope (6 March 2014).

- 27 February
  - Despite claims of a recent hiatus in global warming, the number of local temperature extremes has "dramatically and unequivocally increased in number and area", according to researchers at the University of New South Wales. This has also occurred despite the complete absence of a strong El Niño since 1998.
  - NASA scientists report that Yamato 000593, the second largest meteorite from Mars found on Earth, contains microscopic spheres rich in carbon that may have been formed from biotic activity.

=== March ===
- 3 March – Scientists announce the discovery of pithovirus, the largest giant virus yet known, revived from a 30,000-year-old sample of frozen tundra.
- 4 March – A new study concludes that nearly one-fifth of the 720 UNESCO World Heritage Sites will be affected by rising sea levels this century if global temperatures rise by 3 °C.
- 5 March – NASA scientists report that asteroid 2014 DX110, a near-Earth asteroid roughly 20–40 m (66–131 ft) in diameter, passed less than 1 lunar distance from Earth.
- 6 March
  - NASA reports disintegration of asteroid P/2013 R3 observed by the Hubble Space Telescope (images).
  - The discovery of a new living coral reef with an area of 28 km^{2} in the territorial waters of Iraq is announced in Scientific Reports.
- 7 March – NASA reports that the Wide-field Infrared Survey Explorer (WISE), after an exhaustive survey, has not been able to uncover any evidence of "Planet X", a hypothesized planet within the Solar System.
- 9 March – Researchers from the University of East Anglia discover four new ozone-depleting gases (3 CFCs and one HCFC). Two of the gases are still accumulating in the atmosphere, but their origins remain unknown.
- 10 March – Stanford bioengineer develops a 50-cent paper microscope capable of a magnification of up to 2000 times.
- 12 March
  - The Very Large Telescope discovers the largest known yellow star, HR 5171A, which is 1,300 times the diameter of the Sun. It has a companion star that orbits so close, the two stars are almost merged.
  - The discovery of a ringwoodite sample provides strong evidence of water in huge volumes in the Earth's mantle at 400 to 700 km (250 to 430 mi) below the surface.

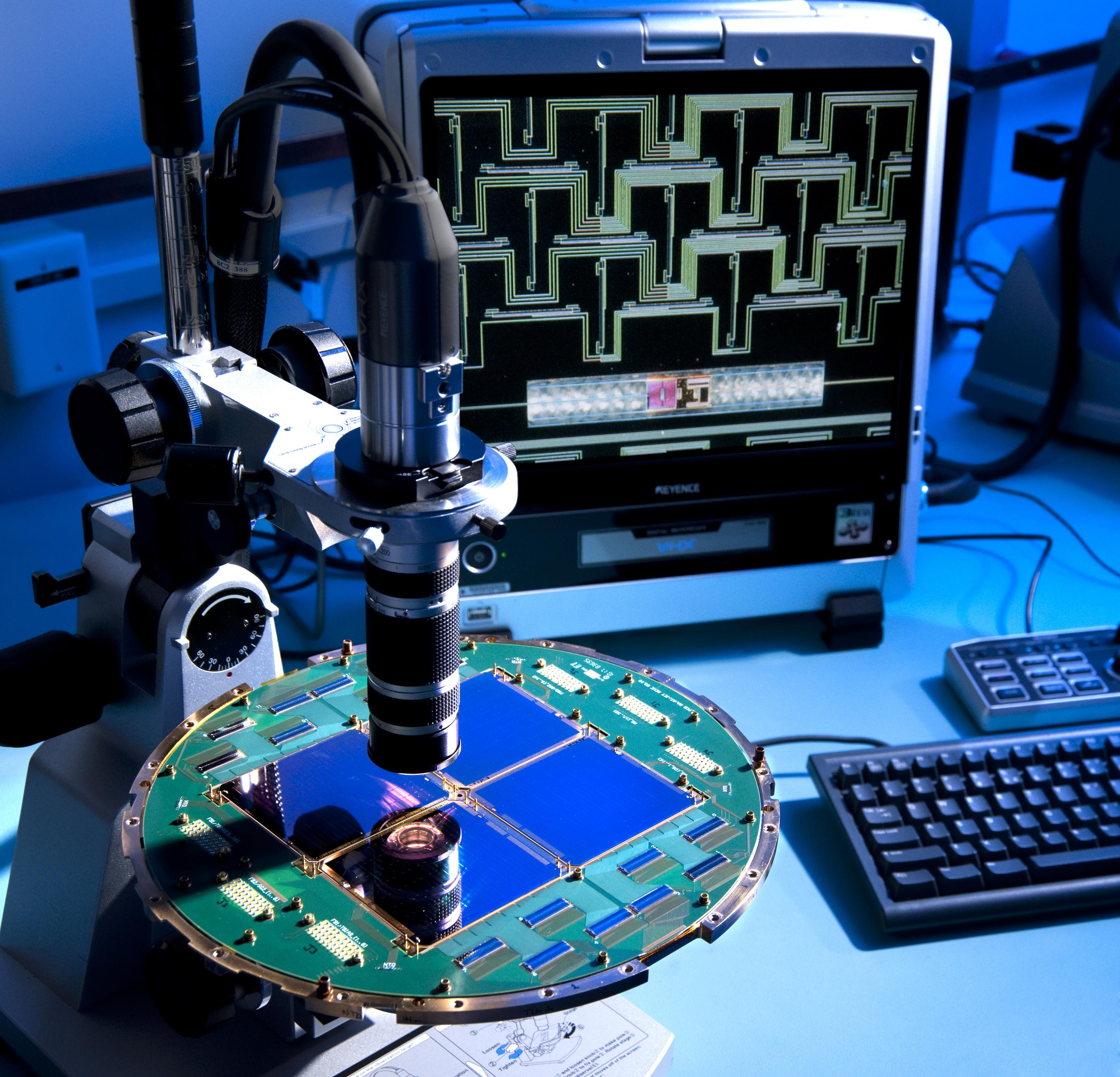
Evidence of gravitational waves in the infant universe may have been uncovered by the microscopic examination of the focal plane of the BICEP2 radio telescope.

  - Iranian scientists at Gilan University created self-cleaning coatings for the textile factories and in construction verified surfaces.
- 13 March – Researchers in Siberia state that they have access to good quality DNA that offers a "high chance" of cloning the woolly mammoth.
- 17 March
  - By demonstrating rippling patterns (the possible effect of gravitational waves) in the cosmic microwave background, astronomers may have uncovered a major piece of evidence to support inflation and the Big Bang theory of the universe. However, on 19 June 2014, lowered confidence in confirming the findings was reported; and on 19 September 2014, even more lowered confidence.
  - A large, previously stable part of Greenland has been found to be melting rapidly, suggesting that future sea level estimates will have to be revised upwards.
  - Specimens of the moss Chorisodontium aciphyllum are revived after 1500 years frozen.
- 19 March – A new record efficiency of 17 percent for thin-film solar is achieved.
- 20 March – A new method to obtain human-induced pluripotent stem cells (hiPSCs) from a single drop of finger-pricked blood is achieved.
- 23 March – Scientists demonstrate the distribution of three entangled photons at three different locations, several hundreds of metres apart. This could pave the way to multi-party quantum communication.
- 24 March
  - Researchers create a biodegradable battery that could be used for medical implants inside the body.
  - Rates of blindness and partial sight have plummeted in the developed world over the last 20 years, according to new research.
- 25 March – Paleontologists assemble giant turtle bone from fossil discoveries made 160 years apart. Atlantochelys mortoni, found in Cretaceous sediments dating back 75 million years, was possibly the largest turtle that ever lived.
- 26 March
  - Astronomers report the discovery of a new minor planet, named 2012 VP113, beyond the planet Neptune in the Solar System.
  - Astronomers report the discovery of the first ring system around an asteroid (10199 Chariklo).
- 27 March
  - The first synthetic chromosome is created for integration into a yeast cell.
  - A study finds that Cuvier's beaked whale is capable of diving to a depth of 3.2 km and staying under water for 137 minutes, both records for a mammal.

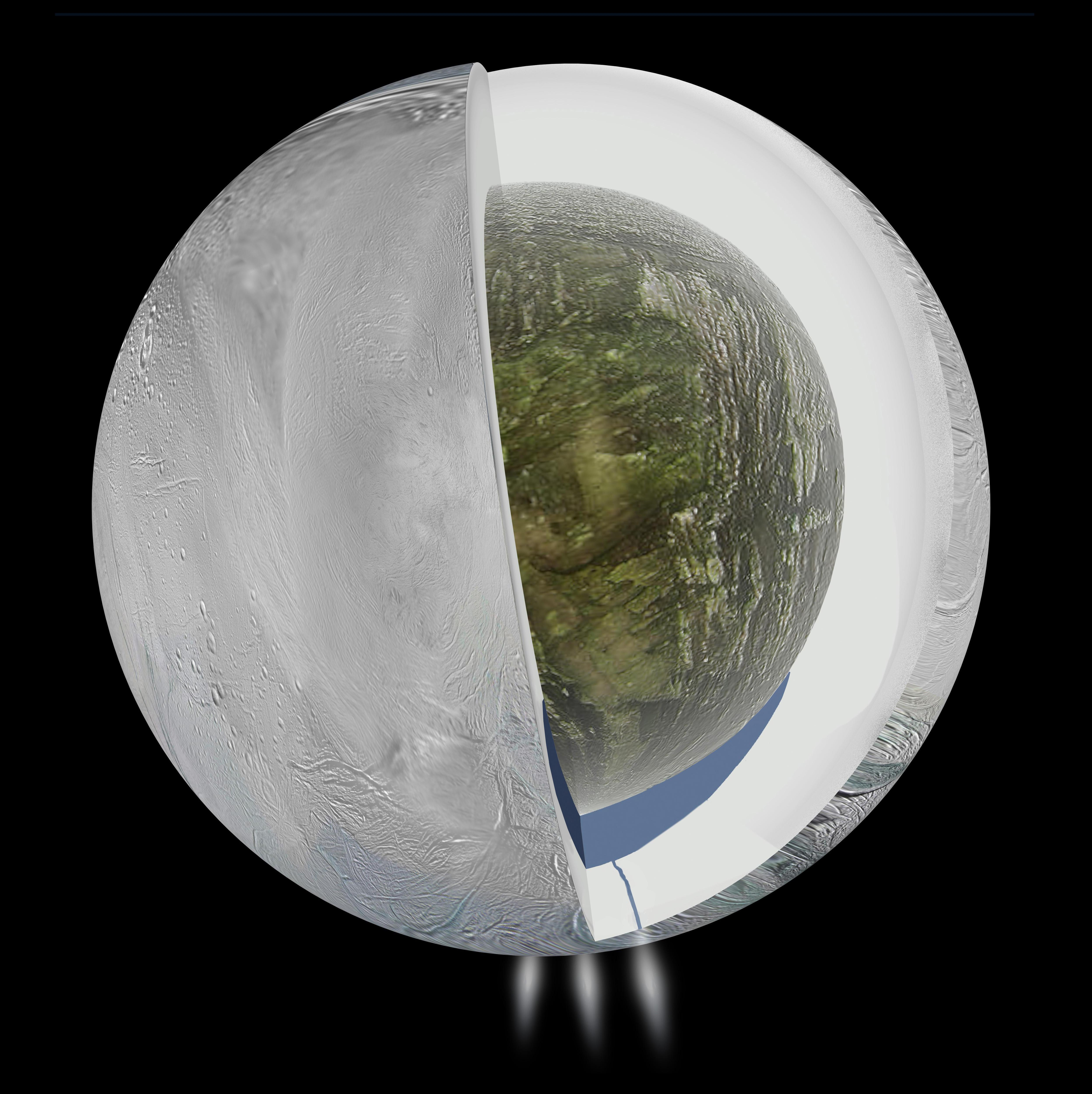
Evidence of an underground ocean of liquid water on Enceladus, moon of planet Saturn, reported (3 April 2014; artist image).

- 30 March – The first evidence that CRISPR can reverse disease symptoms in living animals has been demonstrated. Using this new gene-editing technique, MIT researchers cured mice of a rare liver disorder.
- 31 March
  - The U.N. Intergovernmental Panel on Climate Change (IPCC) releases its second of four planned reports examining the state of climate science. This latest document summarizes what the scientific literature says about "Impacts, Adaptation, and Vulnerability".
  - In the landmark case of Australia v. Japan, the International Court of Justice (ICJ) in The Hague has ruled that Japan's JARPA II whaling program in the Antarctic is not for scientific purposes and has ordered all permits to be revoked.

=== April ===
- 1 April
  - Eating seven or more portions (560 g) of fruit and vegetables a day reduces your risk of death at any point in time by 42 percent compared to eating less than one portion, reports a new study by University College London.
  - RIKEN concludes that a recent study claiming to having produced stem cells via STAP techniques was partially falsified.
- 3 April – NASA reports that evidence for a large underground ocean of liquid water on Enceladus, moon of planet Saturn, has been found by the Cassini. According to the scientists, evidence of an underground ocean suggests that Enceladus is one of the most likely places in the Solar System to "host microbial life". (artist image)
- 4 April – By manipulating the appropriate signaling, researchers have turned embryonic stem cells into a fish embryo, essentially controlling embryonic development. This breakthrough is a major step toward being able to grow whole organs from stem cells.
- 6 April – Samsung has developed a new method of growing large area, single crystal wafer scale graphene, a major development that will accelerate the commercialization of this material.
- 7 April
  - A critical bug (named "Heartbleed") in OpenSSL is estimated to have left 17% of the Internet's secure web servers vulnerable to data theft.
  - Researchers show the first evidence that green tea extract enhances cognitive functions, especially the working memory, suggesting a possible treatment for impairments such as dementia.
- 8 April – A battery that can charge in under 30 seconds is demonstrated at a technology conference in Tel Aviv.
- 9 April – Scientists reconstruct a gigantic asteroid impact that occurred 3.26 billion years ago near the Barberton Greenstone Belt. The impactor was up to 58 km (36 miles) wide, leaving a hole almost 480 km (300 miles) across – two and a half times larger in diameter than the Chicxulub crater which killed off the dinosaurs.
- 10 April
  - NASA scientists report the possible discovery of the first exomoon candidate. (artist image)
  - NASA astronomers report that the Hubble Space Telescope can now precisely measure distances up to 10,000 light-years away by using spatial scanning, a ten-fold improvement over earlier measurements. (related image)

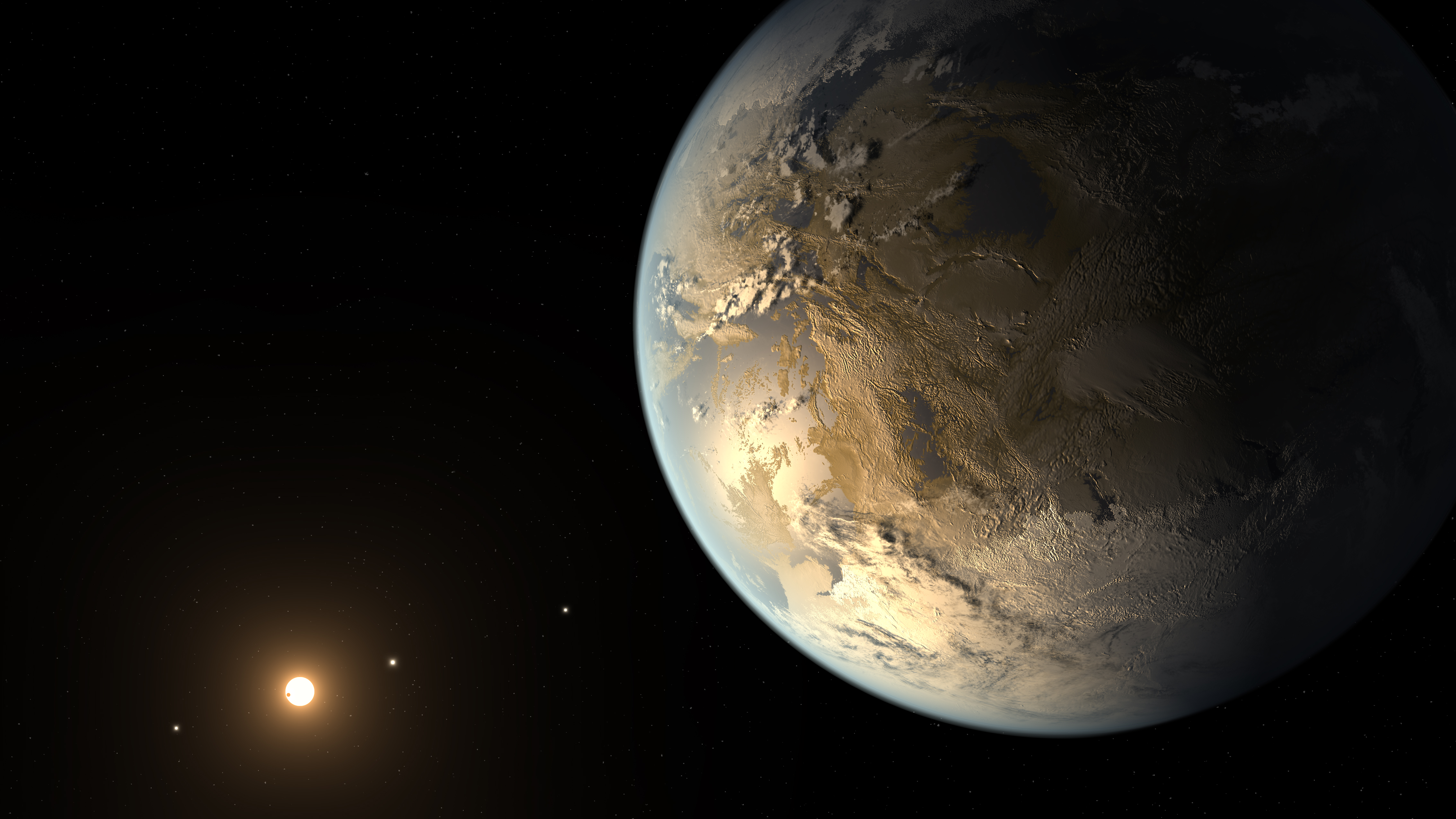
Discovery of Kepler-186f - an Earth-sized exoplanet in the habitable zone of its host star (artist concept; 17 April 2014).

- 11 April – A new statistical analysis of temperature data since the year 1500 concludes "with confidence levels greater than 99%, and most likely greater than 99.9%" that recent global warming is not caused by natural factors and is man-made.
- 14 April – NASA scientists report the possible beginning of a new moon, within the A Ring, of the planet Saturn. (related image)
- 15 April – A total lunar eclipse occurs, visible across the Pacific Ocean and the Americas.
- 16 April – The discovery of a protein, dubbed Juno, that is essential to mammalian fertilization is announced in Nature.
- 17 April
  - NASA announces the discovery of Kepler-186f, the first Earth-sized exoplanet within the habitable zone of its host star. (artist concept and comparison)
  - Advanced Cell Technology announces that it created new human embryonic stem cells by fusing DNA from an adult with an enucleated egg cell, a form of human cloning.
  - Researchers at Cardiff University achieve a major breakthrough in treating chronic lymphocytic leukaemia (CLL), the most common form of leukaemia.
- 18 April
  - A flight test of controlled-descent hardware and software on the first-stage booster of a SpaceX Falcon 9 launch vehicle occurred on April 18, 2014, and became the first successful controlled ocean soft touchdown of a liquid-rocket-engine orbital booster. The booster stage successfully approached the water surface with no spin and at zero vertical velocity, as designed. The booster had been traveling at a velocity of Mach 10 (10,000 km/h; 6,300 mph) at an altitude of 80,000 meters (260,000 ft) prior to the descent test.
  - NASA announces that the Lunar Atmosphere and Dust Environment Explorer (LADEE) spacecraft successfully completed its mission with a planned impact on the moon at about 12:30am/et/usa.
- 19 April – A particularly bright meteor, presumably from Lyrids, flashes over several Russian cities, including Murmansk, and is recorded by dash cams. The meteor burned away above the Earth around 2:10 a.m. local time.
- 22 April – Asteroid impacts are more common than previously thought, according to a presentation by the B612 Foundation, which shows evidence that 26 multi-kiloton collisions have occurred since 2001.
- 23 April – The Federal Communications Commission announces that it will consider a new rule that will allow Internet service providers to offer content providers a faster track to send content, thus reversing their earlier net neutrality position. A possible solution to net neutrality concerns may be municipal broadband, according to Professor Susan Crawford, a legal and technology expert at Harvard Law School.
- 24 April
  - Kryptodrakon is classified as the oldest pterodactyloid pterosaur discovered to date.
  - Nautilus Minerals has finalised an agreement with Papua New Guinea over the first deep sea mining operations. A project known as Solwara 1 aims to extract ores of copper, gold and other valuable metals from depths of 1,500m.
- 25 April – The sequencing of the tsetse fly genome, which causes the deadly sleeping sickness in Africa, is completed after a 10-year multimillion-dollar effort.

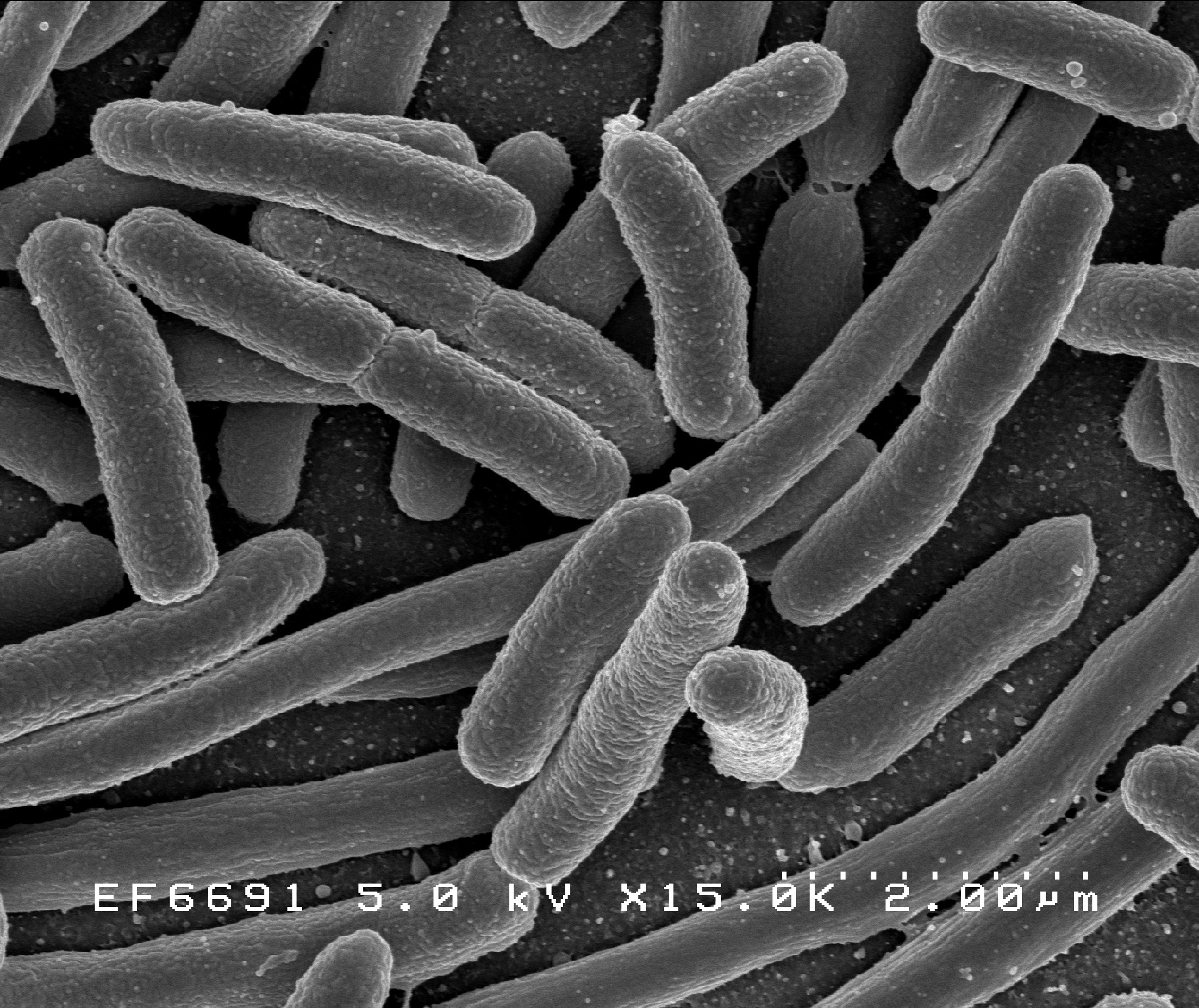
Antibiotic resistance is now a major global threat, WHO reports. (30 April 2014).

- 28 April
  - Stanford bioengineers have developed faster, more energy-efficient microchips based on the human brain – 9,000 times faster and using significantly less power than a typical PC.
  - Levels of atmospheric methane – a powerful greenhouse gas – had been stable for a decade, but recently began rising again. This can be explained by emissions from northern wetlands and thawing permafrost, according to a major study.
- 29 April – An annular solar eclipse occurs.
- 30 April
  - Antibiotic resistance is now a "major global threat" to public health, according to a report by the World Health Organization (WHO).
  - Astronomers have measured an exoplanet's length of day for the first time. Beta Pictoris b was found to have a day that lasts only eight hours.

=== May ===
- 1 May – Cancer researchers report that e-cigarettes "get so hot that they, too, can produce a handful of the carcinogens found in cigarettes and at similar levels".
- 5 May – The World Health Organization (WHO) announces that the spread of polio is a world health emergency - outbreaks of the disease in Asia, Africa and the Middle East are considered "extraordinary".
- 6 May – The third National Climate Assessment is released by the US government.
- 7 May
  - The first realistic "virtual universe" is created, simulating 13 billion years of cosmic evolution in a cube with 350 million light year long sides and unprecedented resolution.
  - Researchers announce that they successfully introduced two artificial nucleotides, Unnatural Base Pairs (UBRs), into bacterial DNA, and by including the individual artificial nucleotides in the culture media, were able to passage the bacteria 24 times; they did not create mRNA or proteins able to use the artificial nucleotides. The artificial nucleotides featured two fused aromatic rings which formed a complex mimicking the natural (dG–dC) base pair.
  - For the first time, researchers sequence the genome of the spider.
  - Global scientific output doubles every nine years, according to a new analysis going back to the year 1650.
- 8 May – Scientists publish a comprehensive study of Comet ISON and its disintegration, reported to have occurred on 2 December 2013, suggesting that the comet fully disintegrated hours before perihelion.
- 9 May
  - The maximum theoretical limit of energy needed to control the magnetisation of a single atom is demonstrated, a finding that could improve nanotechnology devices and quantum computers.
  - After eight years of development, a new hi-tech bionic arm becomes the first of its kind to gain FDA approval for mass production.
- 13 May – New research shows unlimited heat potential in graphene.

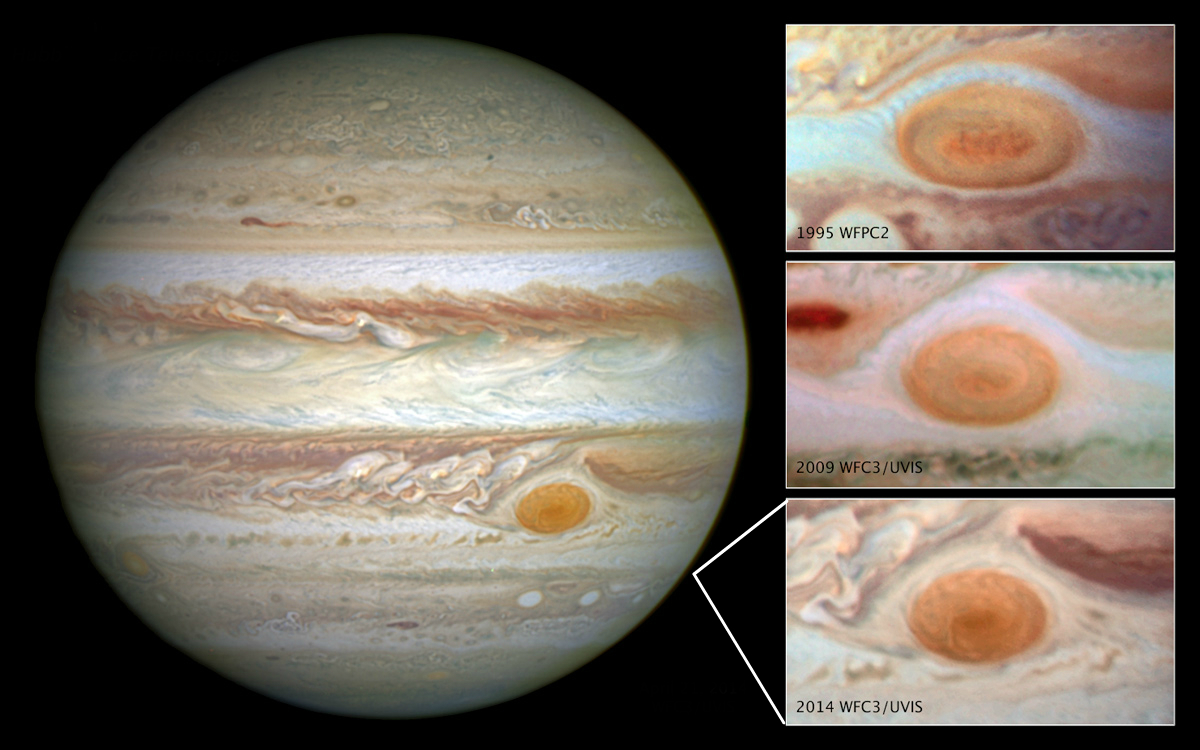
Jupiter - Great Red Spot is decreasing in size (15 May 2014).

- 14 May
  - Even the multiverse will come to an end, according to a new view of quantum theory.
  - A new device is developed that can sort, store and retrieve individual cells for study, using components similar to those that control electrons in microchips.
- 15 May
  - The Federal Communications Commission (FCC) decides to consider two options regarding internet services: first, permit fast and slow broadband lanes, thereby compromising net neutrality; and second, reclassify broadband as a telecommunication service, thereby preserving net neutrality.
  - Jupiter's red spot continues to shrink, as shown in new images.
- 16 May
  - NASA extends the Kepler mission to the K2 mission, a reduced two reaction wheel operation mode necessitated by faults in the originally designed four wheel mode used to accurately aim the telescope, to continue exoplanet discovery as well as new scientific observation opportunities.
  - In a report published in the journal Science, genetic testing of the skeleton dubbed "Naia" indicates that Paleoamericans and modern Native Americans have the same descendants.
  - Genetic mutations that drive cancer are tracked back to cancer stem cells in patients for the first time.
- 17 May – Paleontologists in Argentina discover what appears to be the largest dinosaur yet found. Based on its gigantic thigh bones, it was 40 m (130 ft) long and 20 m (65 ft) tall, weighing 77 tonnes. This species of Titanosaur lived in the forests of Patagonia between 95 and 100 million years ago.
- 19 May
  - Scientists announce that numerous microbes, like Tersicoccus phoenicis, may be resistant to methods usually used in spacecraft assembly clean rooms, and as a consequence, may have unintentionally contaminated spacecraft. However, it's not currently known if such resistant microbes could have withstood space travel and are present on the Curiosity rover now on the planet Mars.
  - NASA begins construction of the 2016 Mars Lander, InSight.
  - Antarctica is now losing about 160 billion tonnes of ice a year to the ocean - twice as much as when the continent was last surveyed.
- 21 May – The International Institute for Species Exploration (IISE) announces its annual list of the "Top 10 New Species" and includes the microbe Tersicoccus phoenicis which is resistant to methods usually used in spacecraft assembly clean rooms to prevent contaminating celestial bodies that spacecraft may visit.
- 25 May – Researchers have found a mutated gene common to a rare, but particularly virulent, form of pancreatic cancer.
- 28 May – The first two attempts at a database of every single human protein - the "proteome" - have been made public.
- 29 May – Scientists have transferred data by quantum teleportation over a distance of 10 feet with a zero percent error rate.

=== June ===
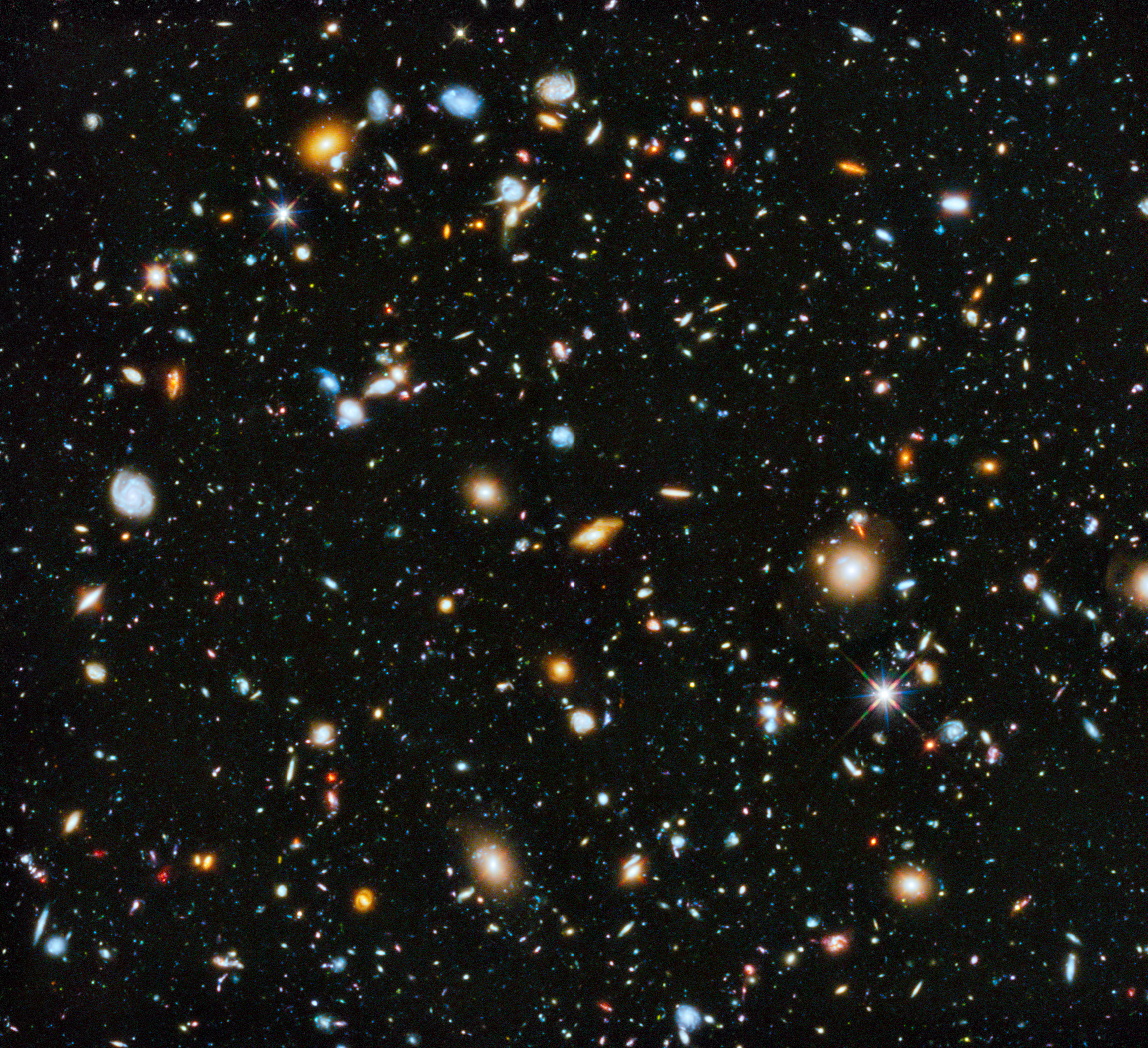
Hubble Ultra-Deep Field image (full range of UV to NIR light) includes galaxies existing shortly after the Big Bang (June 2014).

- 2 June – Inspired by dinosaurs, scientists from the Korea Advanced Institute of Science and Technology (KAIST) develop a robot that runs at a speed of 46 kilometres per hour (29 mph) on a treadmill.
- 3 June
  - NASA releases the Hubble Ultra-Deep Field image composed of, for the first time, the full range of ultraviolet to near-infrared light. The image, in the constellation Fornax, includes some of the most distant galaxies to have been imaged by an optical telescope, existing shortly after the Big Bang. (related image)
  - The Curiosity rover on the planet Mars observes the planet Mercury transiting the Sun, marking the first time a planetary transit has been observed from a celestial body besides Earth. (related image)
  - Two international trials suggest a promising breakthrough in the treatment of advanced skin cancer.
- 4 June – Astronomers detect the first Thorne-Żytkow objects (TŻOs). These hybrids of red supergiant and neutron stars, first proposed in 1975, had been "theoretical" until now.
- 10 June – Earth and the Moon are 60 million years older than previously believed, according to new evidence.
- 11 June – The salmon genome is fully sequenced.
- 12 June – Researchers present new evidence of vast amounts of water in a transition layer below Earth's crust. Although not in liquid form, it may represent the planet's single largest reservoir.
- 13 June – A new hybrid, flexible, energy-efficient circuit that merges carbon nanotubes with other thin-film transistors that could replace silicon as the traditional material used in electronic chips is reported in Nature Communications. It could be commercially available in the 2020s.

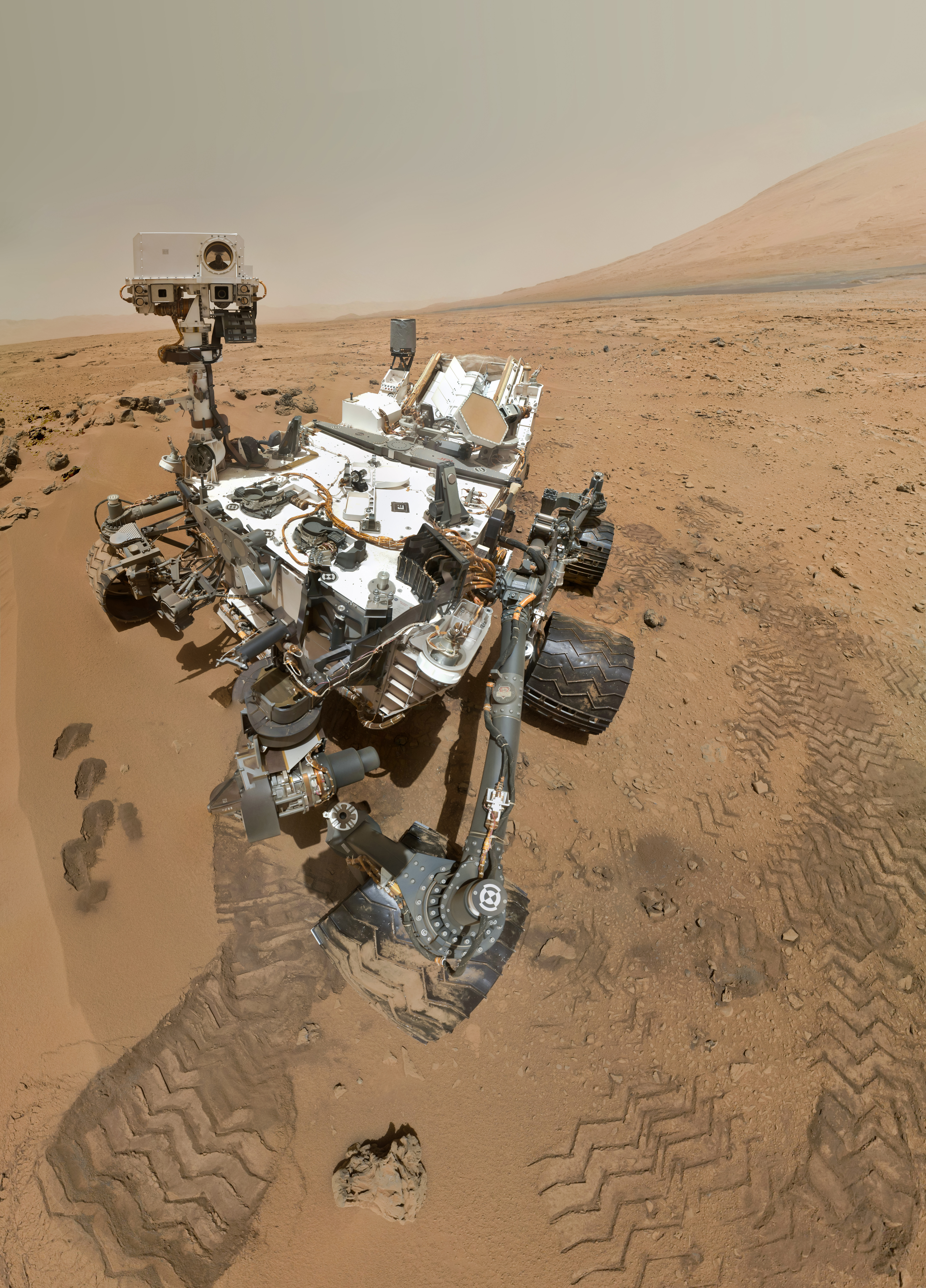
The Curiosity rover completed its first Martian year (687 Earth days) on the planet Mars (24 June 2014).

- 16 June
  - Researchers at King's College London develop a new dental technique known as Electrically Accelerated and Enhanced Remineralisation. This allows a decayed tooth to effectively repair and heal itself without the need for drills, needles or fillings.
  - Sedentary behavior increases risk of certain cancers, according to a new study.
- 19 June
  - A new way to attack antibiotic-resistant bacteria is announced. It involves blocking the mechanism they use to build their exterior coating.
  - Astronomers report lowered confidence in confirming cosmic inflation evidence of gravitational waves announced on 17 March 2014.
- 23 June
  - Globally, May 2014 was the hottest May on record, according to data released by NOAA.
  - NASA announces strong evidence that nitrogen in the atmosphere of Titan, a moon of the planet Saturn, came from materials in the Oort cloud, associated with comets, and not from materials that formed Saturn in earlier times.
- 24 June
  - NASA reports the Curiosity rover on Mars completed its first Martian year—687 Earth days—after finding that Mars once had environmental conditions favorable for microbial life.
  - NASA announces the CheMin, short for "Chemistry and Mineralogy", an X-ray powder diffraction instrument aboard the Curiosity rover on Mars, won the 2013 NASA Government Invention of the year award.
  - The Worldwide Integrated Assessment, issued by the Task Force on Systemic Pesticides, provides "conclusive" evidence that neonicotinoid pesticides are damaging a wide range of beneficial species and are a key factor in the decline of bees.
- 26 June
  - New NASA images show the decline in nitrogen dioxide pollution across the U.S. over the last 10 years.
  - Researchers have detected the smallest force ever measured – approximately 42 yoctonewtons – using a unique optical trapping system that provides ultracold atoms. A yoctonewton is one septillionth of a newton.

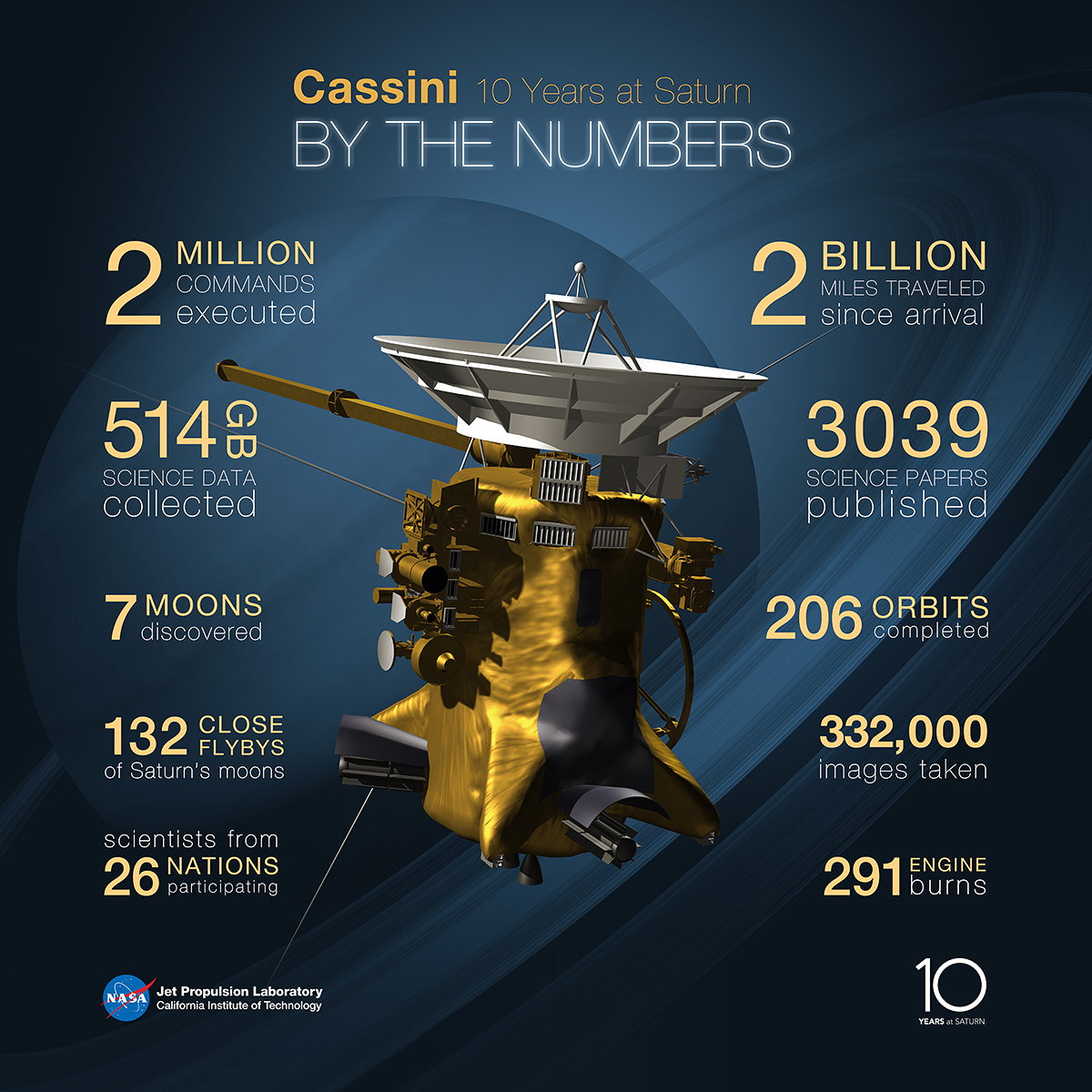
A summary of achievements of the Cassini spacecraft after a decade orbiting the planet Saturn.

- 27 June
  - Scientists identify a new species of elephant shrew, named Macroscelides micus.
  - NASA reports the Curiosity rover on the planet Mars has crossed the boundary line of its "3-sigma safe-to-land ellipse" and is now in territory that may get even more interesting, especially in terms of Martian geology and landscape (view from space).
- 29 June – Indonesia now has greater rates of deforestation than Brazil, despite its forests being a quarter the size of the Amazon rainforest.
- 30 June
  - NASA celebrates ten-years of studying Saturn and related moons by the Cassini spacecraft. (related image)
  - Experiments on rat livers have shown that a new cooling method can triple the time that donor organs can be stored outside the body.

=== July ===
- 2 July
  - NASA's Orbiting Carbon Observatory-2 (OCO-2) satellite, designed to measure global CO_{2} in precise geographic detail, is launched.
  - NASA reports the ocean inside Titan, a moon of the planet Saturn, may be "as salty as the Earth's Dead Sea".
  - Coral reefs in the Caribbean will disappear within 20 years, according to a new report from the IUCN.
  - Fabien Cousteau and two crew members resurface after 31 days living underwater and collecting scientific data.

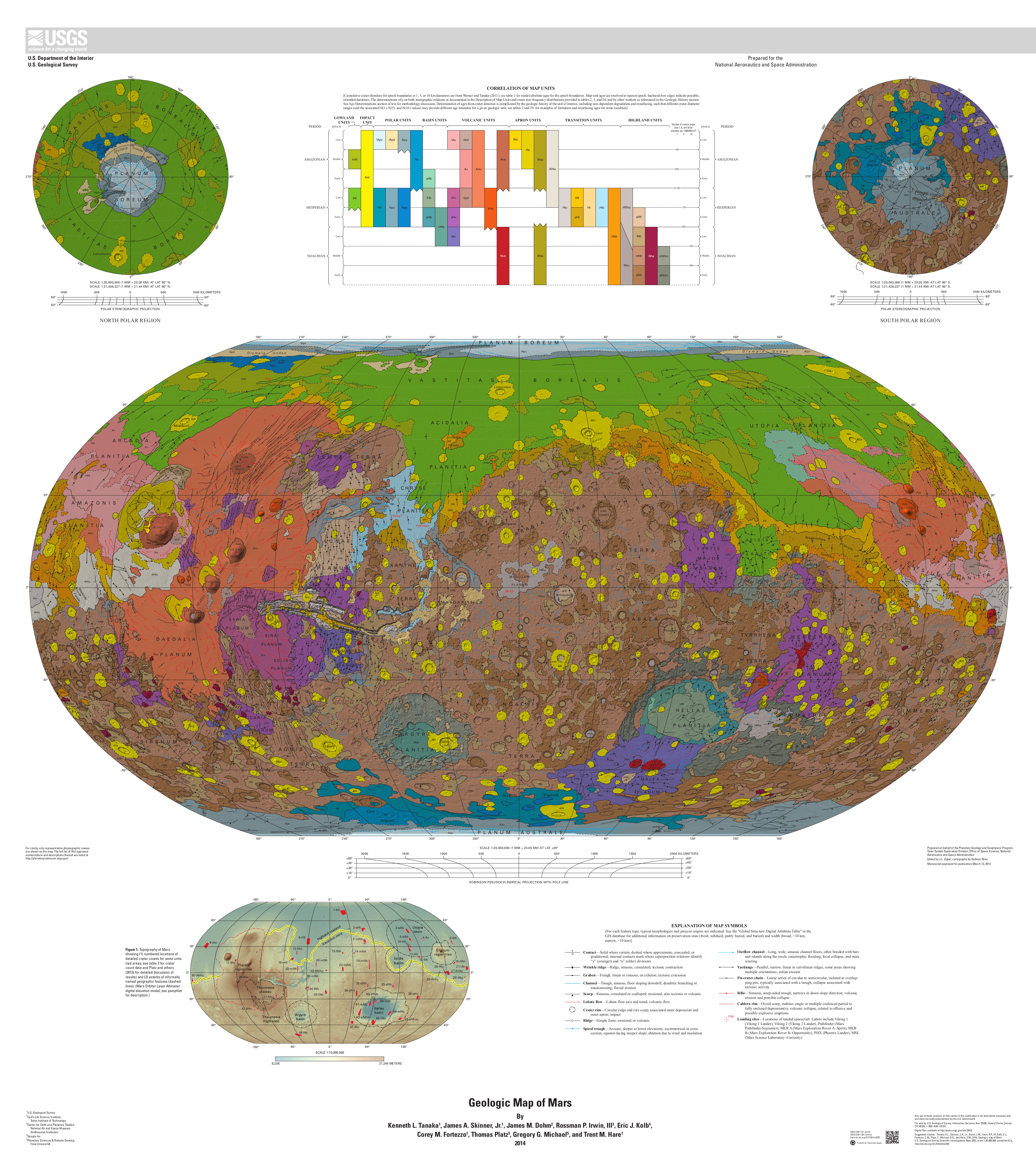
Mars – Geologic Map (USGS; 14 July 2014) (full / video).

- 3 July
  - A genetic mutation that causes autism has been discovered.
  - Astronomers report that the presumed exoplanets "Gliese 581 d" and the Earth-like "Gliese 581 g" are actually artifacts of stellar activity which, when "incompletely corrected", caused false detections.
- 4 July – Japanese scientists say they have found a way to slow down the ageing process in flowers by up to a half, meaning bouquets could remain fresh for much longer.
- 7 July
  - NASA reports Voyager 1, the farthest spacecraft from Earth, experienced a new third "tsunami wave", generated from activity (coronal mass ejections) on the sun, further confirming that the probe is in interstellar space.
  - Scientists announce the discovery of a gigantic prehistoric bird, named Pelagornis sandersi, with the largest ever wingspan (up to an estimated 7.4 m (24 ft)).
- 9 July – The New York Times reports a reboot plan to rescue the International Cometary Explorer (or ICE or ISEE-3) spacecraft, the first spacecraft to visit a comet but removed from service by NASA in 1997, failed. The cause, currently under investigation, was originally believed to be a lack of nitrogen pressurant in the fuel tanks: this has now been proven not to be the case. The team is continuing to work the thruster issue before the craft reaches a point where the remaining fuel will not be sufficient to meaningfully alter its course. An alternative plan in the use of the spacecraft is to "collect scientific data and send it back to Earth."
- 10 July
  - NASA reports that gullies on the surface of the planet Mars are mostly formed by the seasonal freezing of carbon dioxide, and not by that of liquid water as considered earlier.
  - Two stars – ULAS J0744+25 and ULAS J0015+01 – have been found orbiting the Milky Way at distances of 775,000 and 900,000 light-years from Earth, respectively. This makes them the most distant Milky Way stars ever detected, extending the boundaries of our home galaxy.

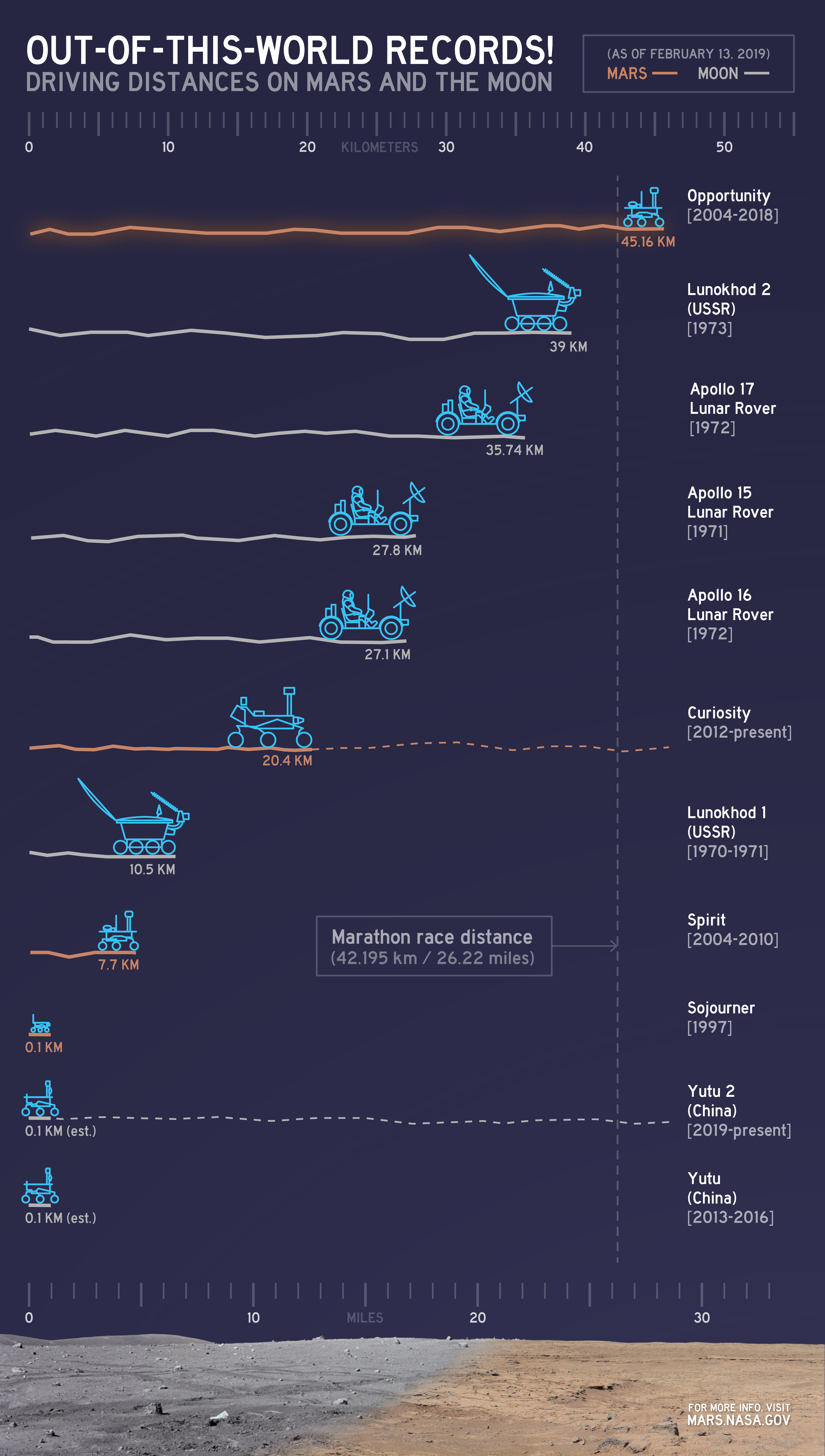
Driving Distance Records - for Out-Of-This-World "Space Rovers" (NASA;28 July 2014).

- 11 July – The largest ever study of its kind has found significant differences between organic food and conventionally grown crops. The former has almost 70 percent more antioxidants – equivalent to eating between 1-2 extra portions of fruit and vegetables a day – and significantly lower levels of toxic heavy metals.
- 14 July
  - NASA announces a discussion by space experts about the "Search for Life in the Universe" (video replay (86:49)).
  - USGS releases geologic map of the planet Mars. (Mars map => crop / full / video (00:56)).
- 17 July – A new report shows how improvements in agricultural efficiency could feed an extra three billion people.
- 20 July – The anaphase-promoting complex – one of the most important and complicated proteins involved in cell division – has been mapped in 3D at a resolution of less than a nanometre. Researchers claim this finding could transform the understanding of cancer and reveal new binding sites for future cancer drugs.
- 21 July
  - For the first time, researchers have demonstrated proof-of-concept that the HIV virus can be eliminated from the DNA of human cell cultures.
  - Globally, June 2014 was the hottest June since records began in 1880, according to latest data from the National Oceanic and Atmospheric Administration (NOAA). This follows the warmest May on record the previous month. Experts predict that 2014 will be an El Niño year.
- 22 July – Self-cooling solar cells have been developed by Stanford researchers, using tiny pyramid structures made of silica glass.
- 23 July
  - NASA reports that a massive, potentially damaging, Solar Superstorm (Solar flare, Coronal mass ejection, Solar EMP) event occurred on 23 July 2012, and barely missed Earth. There is an estimated 12% chance of a similar event occurring between 2012 and 2022.
  - For the first time, evidence, in the form of fossilized trackways in Canada, shows that tyrannosaurs may have hunted in packs.

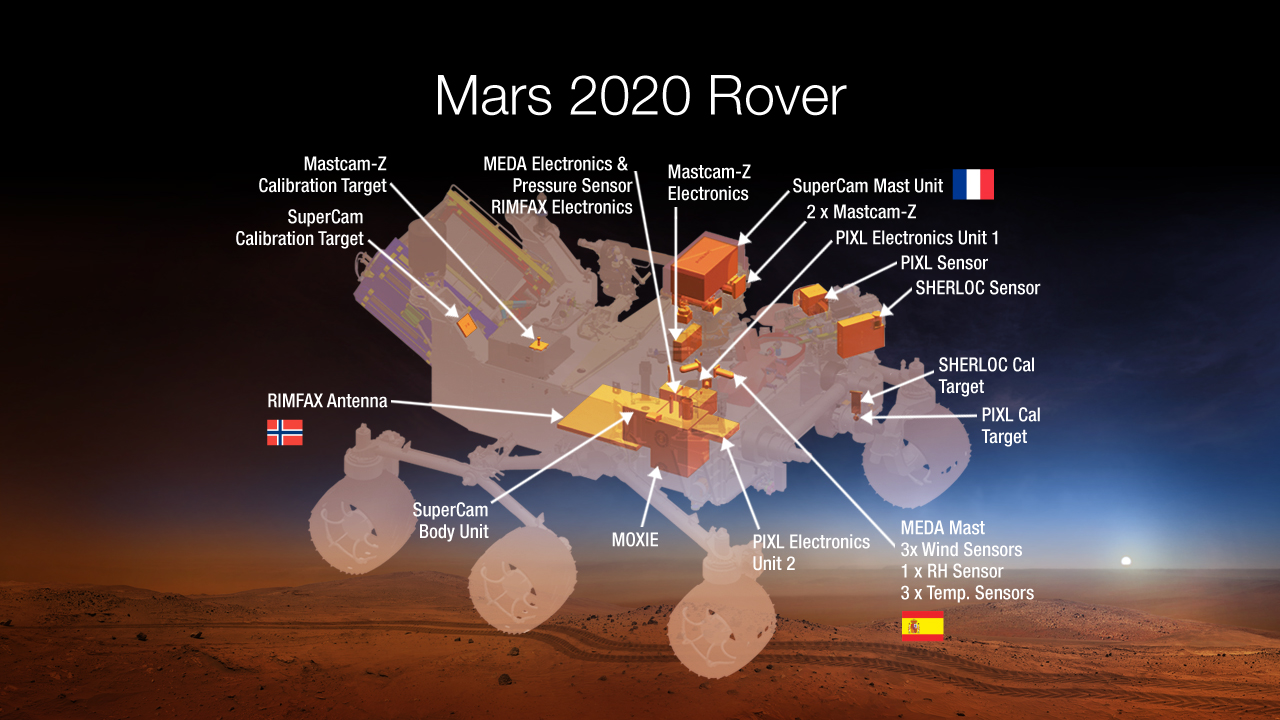
Mars 2020 Rover - Payload (artist's concept; 31 July 2014).

- 24 July
  - NASA announces the determination of the most precise measurement so far attained for the size of an exoplanet (Kepler-93b); the discovery of an exoplanet (Kepler-421b) that has the longest known year (704 days) of any transiting planet found so far; and, the finding of very dry atmospheres on three exoplanets (HD 189733b, HD 209458b, WASP-12b) orbiting sun-like stars.
  - A new report from Stanford University warns that biodiversity is reaching a tipping point that will lead to a sixth mass extinction.
- 28 July – NASA reports that the Mars rover, "Opportunity", after having traveled over 40 km (25 mi) on the planet Mars, has set a new "off-world" record as the rover having driven the greatest distance, surpassing the previous record held by the Soviet Union's Lunokhod 2 rover that had traveled 39 km (24 mi). (related image)
- 31 July
  - NASA announces the payload for the Mars 2020 rover, an upgraded version of the Curiosity rover presently exploring the planet Mars. (related image).
  - Scientists report details of the evolution of birds from theropod dinosaurs.
  - The Australian humpback dolphin is scientifically described in the journal Marine Mammal Science.
  - Neurons reprogrammed from skin cells have been grafted into the brains of mice for the first time with long-term stability. This demonstration of lastingly stable neuron implantation raises hope for future therapies in humans that could replace sick neurons with healthy ones in the brains of Parkinson's disease patients, for example.

=== August ===
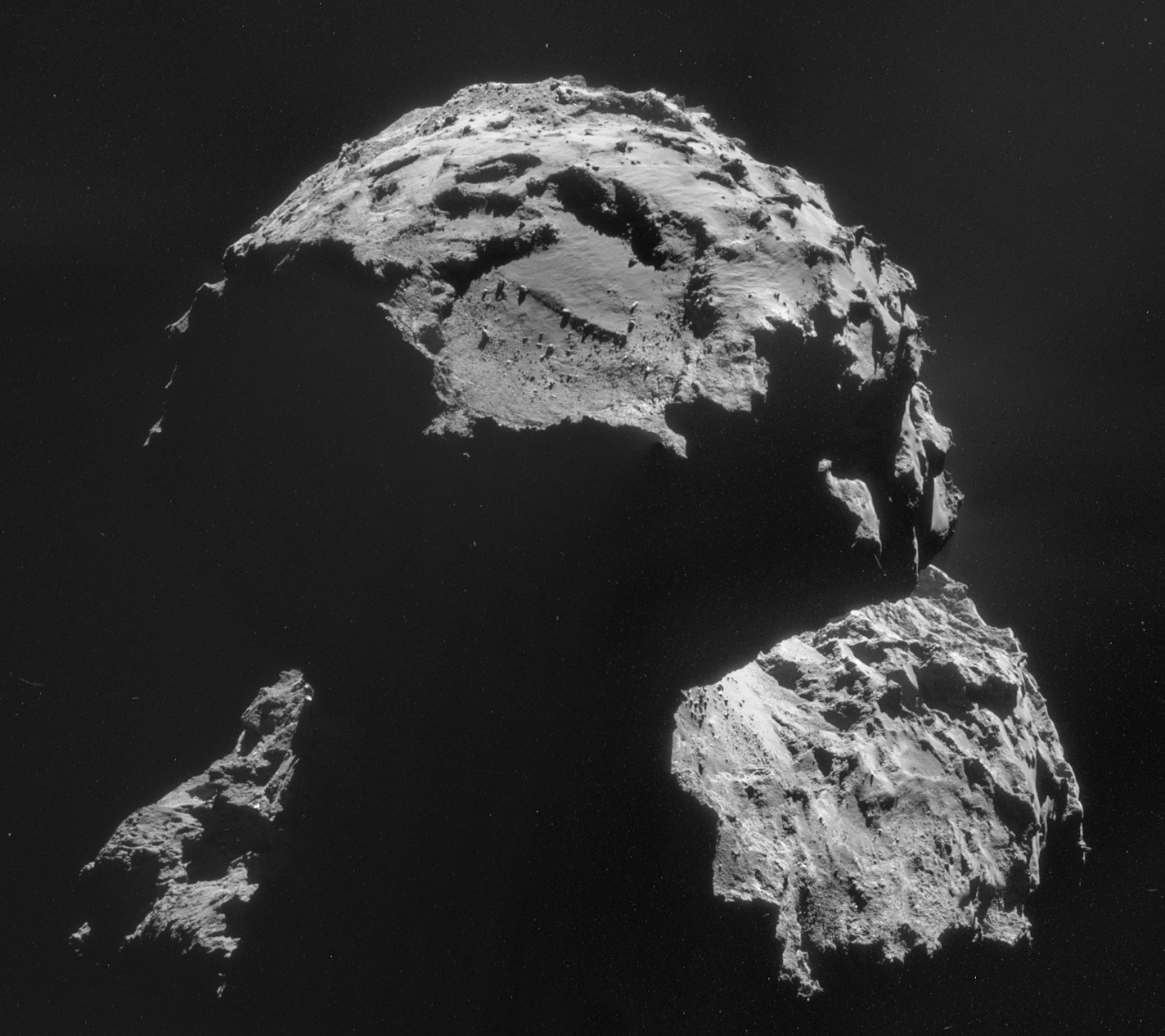
6 August 2014: The Rosetta probe arrives at comet 67P.

- 4 August – A computer simulation by the MD Anderson Cancer Center predicts that on current trends, ongoing improvements in screening and drugs could make hepatitis C a rare disease by 2036.
- 6 August
  - The Curiosity rover celebrates its second anniversary since landing on the planet Mars in 2012.
  - The Rosetta spacecraft arrives at Comet 67P/Churyumov-Gerasimenko. The spacecraft is to begin close extended studies of a comet for the first time and is expected to land an associated probe, named Philae, on the comet's surface in November, 2014.
- 7 August – Scientists at IBM Research have created a neuromorphic (brain-like) computer chip with 1 million programmable neurons and 256 million programmable synapses across 4096 individual neurosynaptic cores.
- 8 August – A stroke therapy using stem cells extracted from patients' bone marrow has shown promising results in the first trial of its kind in humans.
- 10 August
  - The International Cometary Explorer (or ICE or ISEE-3) passes (at 18:17 UTC) about 15,600 km (9,700 mi) from the surface of the Moon and, afterwards, will return to the vicinity of Earth in 17 years. ICE is the first spacecraft to visit a comet but removed from service by NASA in 1997. Recent attempts to regain control of ICE by space enthusiasts have not been successful.
  - A carbon dioxide "sponge" that could help absorb man-made emissions from power plants has been announced by the American Chemical Society.
- 11 August – Astronomers release studies, using the Atacama Large Millimeter/Submillimeter Array (ALMA) for the first time, that detail the distribution of HCN, HNC, H_{2}CO, and dust inside the comae of comets C/2012 F6 (Lemmon) and C/2012 S1 (ISON).
- 13 August
  - NASA's Orbiting Carbon Observatory 2 begins returning data on global CO_{2}.
  - The 2014 International Congress of Mathematicians awards the Fields Medal to Artur Avila, Manjul Bhargava, Martin Hairer, and Maryam Mirzakhani. Mirzakhani is the first woman to win a Fields Medal.
- 14 August
  - Scientists announce the collection of possible interstellar dust particles from the Stardust spacecraft since returning to Earth in 2006.
  - A self-organising robot swarm consisting of 1,000 individual machines has been demonstrated by Harvard University.
- 15 August – Laser physicists have found a way to make atomic force microscope probes 20 times more sensitive and capable of detecting forces as small as the weight of an individual virus.
- 20 August
  - Russian cosmonauts report finding sea plankton on outer window surfaces of the International Space Station and are unable to explain how it got there.
  - Scientists have discovered thousands of different types of microorganisms in Lake Whillans, a large body of water buried 800 m (2,600 ft) under the Antarctic ice sheet.
  - Ice loss from the Greenland and West Antarctic ice sheets has more than doubled in the last five years, based on extensive mapping by the ESA satellite CryoSat-2. The "unprecedented" rate of melting – around 500 cubic kilometres of ice per year – is the highest on record.
  - A new study suggests that modern humans and Neanderthals co-existed in Europe for up to 5,000 years – 10 times longer than previously thought.
  - Scientists have discovered the area of the brain responsible for exercise motivation – the dorsal medial habenula.
- 21 August
  - Researchers have designed a computer program that can accurately recognize users' emotional states as much as 87% of the time.
  - Children's social skills may be declining as they have less time for face-to-face interaction due to their increased use of digital media, according to a UCLA psychology study.
  - A new automated process that uses a flash of light to detect fluorescence lifetimes can improve the sorting and recycling of plastics.
- 24 August – A whole functioning organ – a thymus – has been engineered to grow inside an animal for the first time.
- 25 August – Scientists announce five possible landing sites on comet 67P/Churyumov–Gerasimenko by the Philae lander associated with the Rosetta spacecraft that rendezvoused with the comet on 6 August 2014.
- 28 August
  - NASA reports the observation of a dust cloud believed to have formed as a result of asteroids colliding near the star NGC 2547-ID8, a system 1,200 light years away. This sighting will offer a rare opportunity to observe the processes involved in rocky planet formation.
  - NASA completes a review of the Space Launch System. The rocket will have its first test launch "no later than November 2018" with a possibility of crewed flights to Mars in the 2030s.
- 30 August – A new drug known as LCZ696 can reduce the risk of death from cardiovascular disease by 20% compared to previous treatments. It is claimed to be among the biggest advances in treating this condition in over 10 years.
- 31 August
  - Wine only protects against cardiovascular disease in people who exercise, a study finds.
  - A study of 131,000 people has found that drinking tea reduces non-cardiovascular mortality by 24 percent.

=== September ===
- September – Scientists in Peru release photographs of a live Cuscomys oblativus (the Machu Picchu arboreal chinchilla rat), which has previously thought to have been extinct.
- 1 September – An office enriched with plants makes staff happier and boosts productivity by 15 per cent, according to a study by the University of Queensland.
- 2 September – The current rate of species extinctions is 1,000 times faster than the pre-human era, according to a study in the journal Conservation Biology.
- 3 September
  - Two species are described in the new genus Dendrogramma, which was initially unassigned to any particular phylum in the animal kingdom. It is later classified as a single cnidarian species.
  - Brain-to-brain communication has been demonstrated in humans located 5,000 miles apart.
  - Astronomers have determined that the Milky Way galaxy is part of a newly identified supercluster of galaxies, which they have dubbed 'Laniakea'.
  - Canada has overtaken Brazil to lead the world in forest decline, according to a new report. The pace of decline is accelerating with more than 104 million hectares – about 8.1 per cent of global undisturbed forests – lost from 2000 to 2013.
- 4 September
  - A new study finds there is 99.999% certainty that anthropogenic greenhouse gas emissions are driving global warming.
  - NASA reports receiving the first science data from instruments aboard the Rosetta orbiter studying the comet 67P/Churyumov-Gerasimenko. The data suggests the comet is unusually dark, hydrogen and oxygen were found in the coma and the surface did not contain any large water-ice patches. Large water-ice patches were expected by scientists since the comet is too far away from the Sun's warmth to turn its water to vapor.
  - Oxygen-producing life forms were present on Earth 60 million years earlier than previously thought, according to geologists from Trinity College Dublin.
  - The coffee genome is published, with more than 25,000 genes identified. This reveals that coffee plants makes caffeine using a different set of genes from those found in tea, cacao and other such plants.

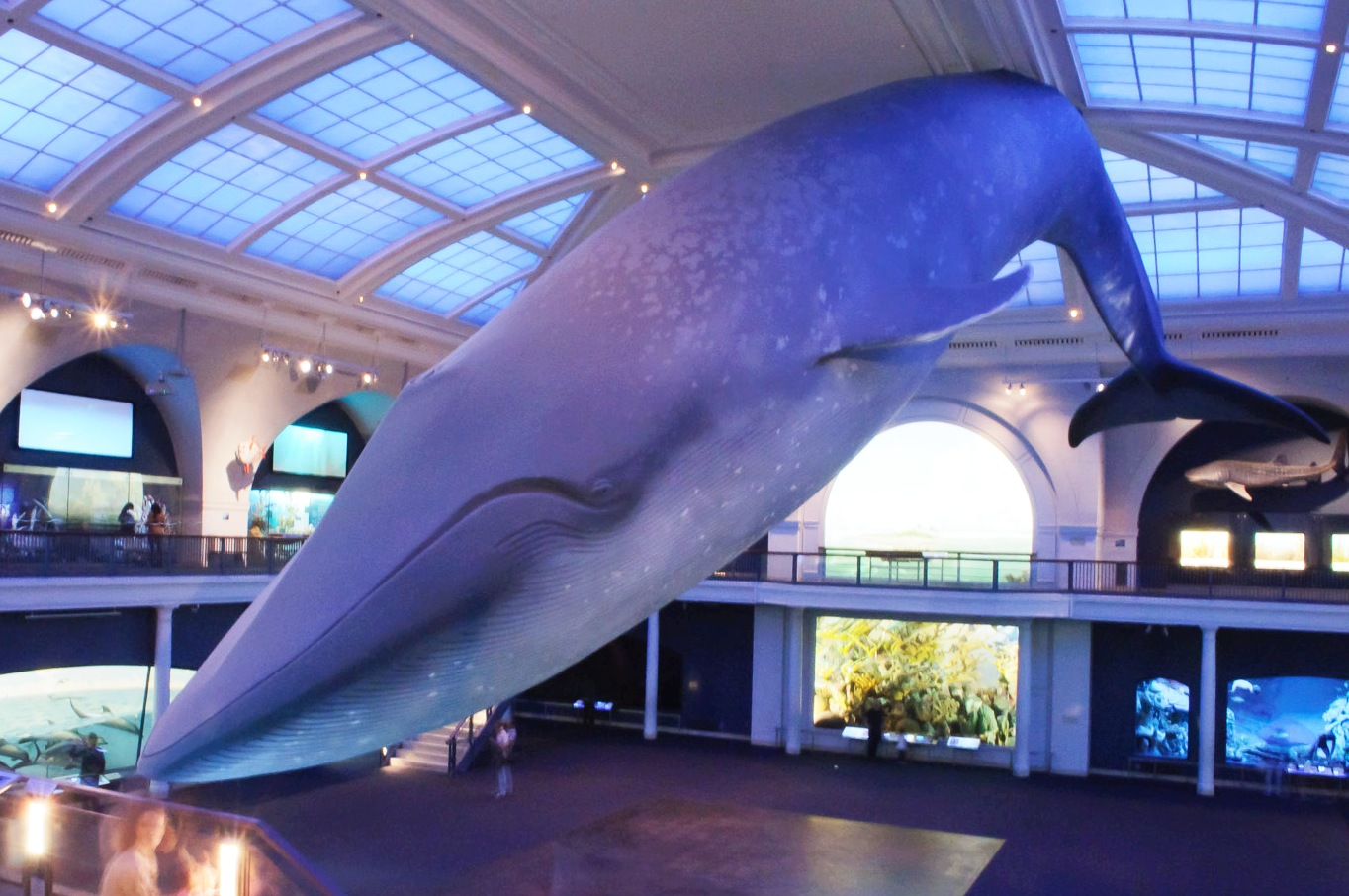
The blue whale exhibit at the American Museum of Natural History.

- 5 September
  - Blue whales off the California coast have recovered to near historical population levels, numbering about 2,200.
  - The first graphene-based flexible display has been manufactured by the University of Cambridge.
- 7 September – NASA reports that a small near-Earth asteroid, named 2014 RC, will make a close approach to Earth of 0.000267 AU (39,900 km; 24,800 mi) (0.1 lunar distances) around 18:01 UTC on 7 September 2014.
- 8 September
  - NASA reports finding evidence of plate tectonics on Europa, a satellite of the planet Jupiter - the first sign of such geological activity on another world other than Earth.
  - Biologists have identified a gene – AMPK – that can extend the life span of fruit flies by 30%. Furthermore, this affects the entire body when activated "remotely" in key organ systems.
- 9 September
  - Greenhouse gas emissions are rising at their fastest rate since 1984, according to the World Meteorological Organisation (WMO).
  - Taking three slow, short walks of five minutes each can reverse the harmful effects of prolonged sitting for three hours.
  - Astronomers have discovered the first evidence of water ice clouds on an object outside of the Solar System.
  - Engineers at Stanford University have created ant-sized radios-on-a-chip, powered by incoming electromagnetic waves, that could be used for the Internet of Things.
- 10 September – The rate of Amazon deforestation increased by 29% in 2013, with 5,891 km^{2} of forest cleared, according to figures released by the Brazilian government.
- 11 September
  - NASA reports the Curiosity rover on the planet Mars has reached Mount Sharp (or Aeolis Mons), a mountain at the center of Gale Crater and the rover mission's long-term prime destination.
  - A new fossil of Spinosaurus confirms it as the first known swimming dinosaur and the only known semi-aquatic dinosaur.
  - SanDisk has revealed a 512 GB SD card, the highest storage capacity ever seen in this form factor.
- 12 September
  - A robot with dexterous arms capable of loading a dishwasher has been unveiled at the British Science Festival.
  - Researchers have achieved a breakthrough in producing hydrogen fuel from water. The new technique, which stores energy from the sun and wind, is 30 times faster than the leading PEME process.
- 15 September
  - ESA announces choosing "Site J" on the "head" of the comet 67P/Churyumov–Gerasimenko as the landing site of the Philae probe attached to the Rosetta spacecraft presently orbiting the comet. The planned landing date is 11 November 2014.
  - When FOXP2 – a human gene responsible for speech and language – is spliced into mice, it allows them to learn more quickly and perform better in a variety of tests, according to a new study.
- 16 September – NASA awards contracts to Boeing and SpaceX to carry out crewed missions to the International Space Station from 2017 onwards, ending U.S. reliance on Russia for space transportation services.
- 17 September
  - A study of 100 billion animals fed GM and regular crops shows no effect of GM crops on animal health.
  - The first blood test to diagnose major depression in adults has been developed.
- 18 September
  - Globally, August 2014 was the hottest August on record, according to data released by NOAA. This follows the hottest May and June also this year.
  - Man-made CO_{2} continues to track the high end of emission scenarios, eroding the chances to keep global warming below 2 °C, according to the Centre for International Climate and Environmental Research (CICERO).
- 19 September – Stanford researchers have developed a "decoy" protein that disrupts metastasis, the process that makes cancer cells spread to other sites in the body.
- 21 September – The MAVEN (Mars Atmosphere and Volatile Evolution) space probe begins orbiting the planet Mars (10:24 pm/et/usa, 21 September 2014).

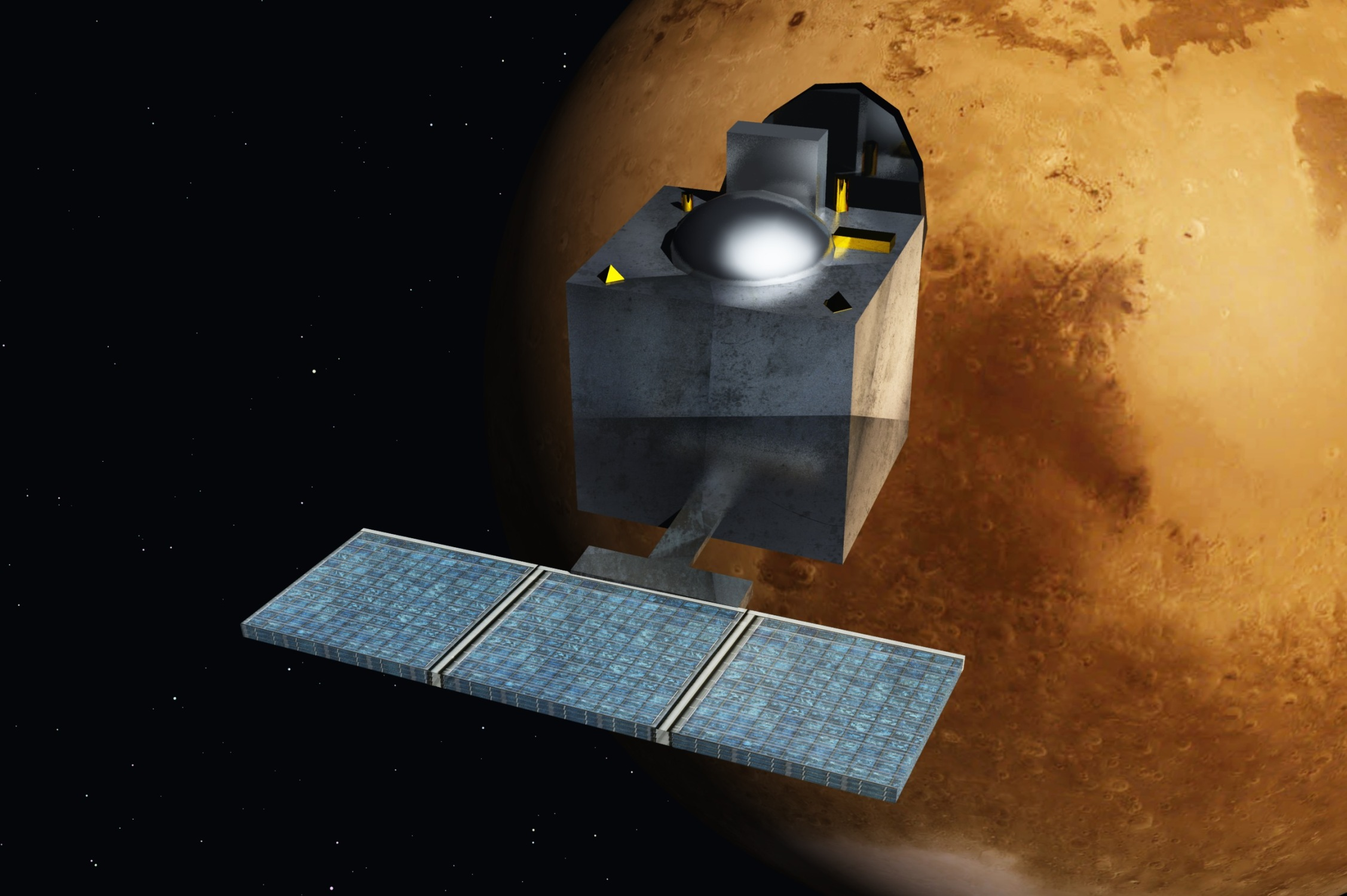
India's first Mars probe - the Mars Orbiter Mission, Mangalyaan.

- 23 September – NASA reports the K2 mission of the Kepler space observatory has completed campaign 1, the first official set of science observations, and that campaign 2 is underway.
- 24 September
  - India's first probe to Mars – the Mars Orbiter Mission, Mangalyaan – successfully enters orbit at 02:00 UTC.
  - NASA reports detecting water vapor on the exoplanet HAT-P-11b, the first time molecules of any kind have been found on such a relatively small exoplanet.
  - Security experts report a security hole, dubbed the "Shellshock" bug, in the Unix Bash shell internet program code that dates from version 1.13 in 1992 and may be considered more significant than the "Heartbleed" bug. An incomplete software patch has been made available to fix it.
- 25 September – A complex organic molecule, Iso-propyl cyanide, has been discovered near the galactic core. This is more similar to amino acids – the building blocks of life – than any previous finding. Furthermore, it is present in abundant quantities.
- 28 September – A new drug for advanced breast cancer can extend patients' lives by 15.7 months (56.5 vs. 40.8 months compared to previous treatments).
- 29 September
  - The Greenland Ice Sheet is more vulnerable to climate change than previously thought, with implications for sea level rise, according to the University of Cambridge.
  - Scientists have designed a record-breaking laser that accelerates the interaction between light and matter by ten times.
- 30 September
  - Microsoft announces Windows 10, the next generation of its operating system.
  - The global average Internet connection speed exceeds the 4 Mbit/s "broadband" threshold for the first time.
  - CDC reports the first Ebola virus case in the United States in Dallas, Texas.

=== October ===
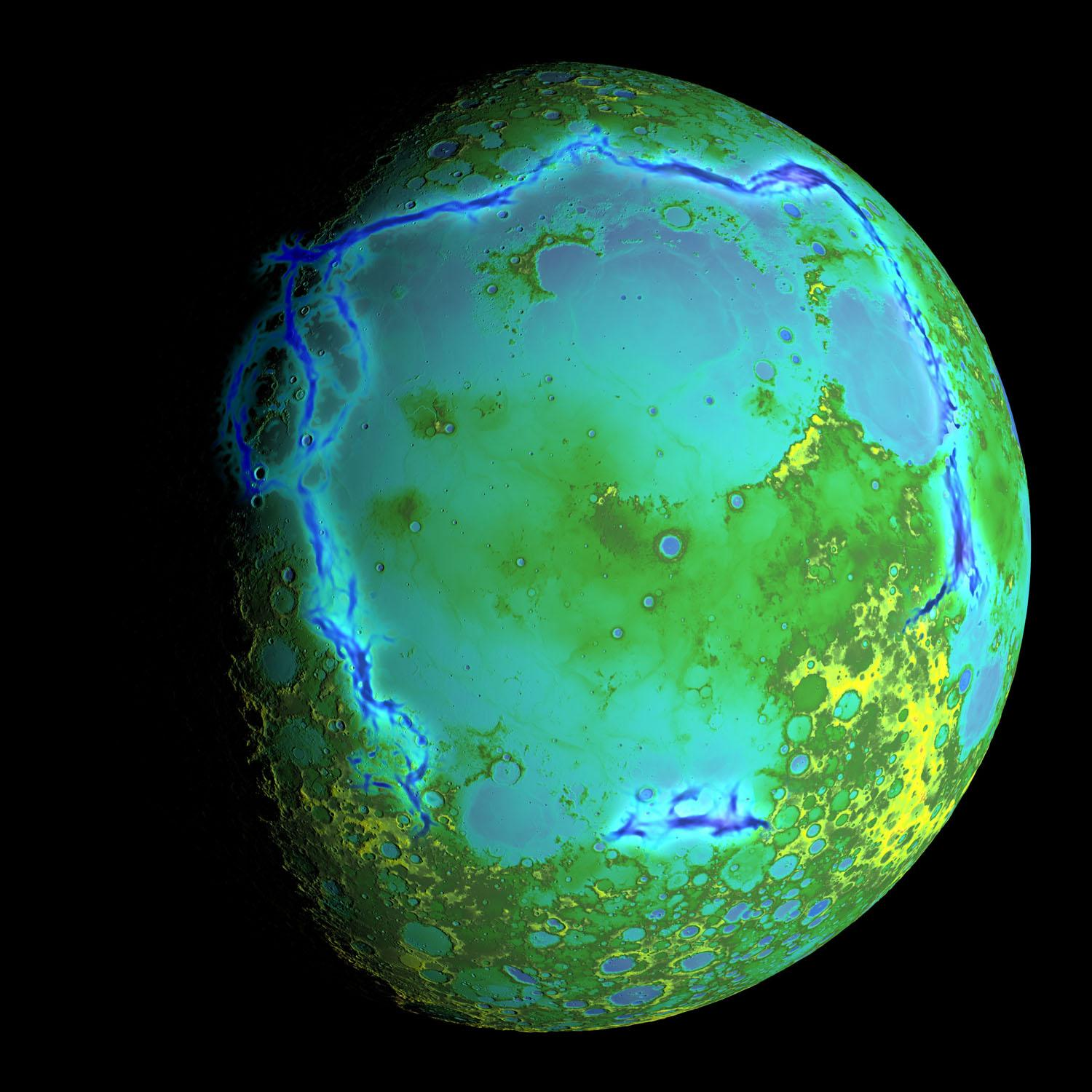
Moon - ancient rift valleys found around Oceanus Procellarum (GRAIL; 1 October 2014).

- 1 October – NASA reports the GRAIL mission detected ancient rift valleys surrounding the large Oceanus Procellarum ("Ocean of Storms") region of the Moon.
- 2 October
  - Previously hypothesized Majorana fermions as quasiparticles are reported to be observed for the first time.
  - The world's first commercial-scale carbon capture and storage (CCS) process on a coal-fired power plant officially opens at Boundary Dam Power Station in Estevan, Saskatchewan.
- 3 October
  - A new reconstruction of its genetic history shows that the HIV pandemic almost certainly originated in Kinshasa, the capital of the Democratic Republic of the Congo, around 1920.
  - A new process can separate CO_{2} molecules into a carbon atom and O_{2} molecule, instead of carbon monoxide and a single oxygen atom. Future applications may include spacesuits that do not require oxygen tanks.
  - Researchers have created a hybrid "solar battery" that can store its own power using nanometer-sized rods of titanium dioxide.
  - The Oregon cave, where the oldest DNA evidence of human habitation in North America was found, has been added to the National Register of Historic Places. The DNA, radiocarbon dated to 14,300 years ago, was found in fossilized human coprolites uncovered in the Paisley Five Mile Point Caves in south-central Oregon.
- 4 October – The first baby born to a mother with a womb transplant is announced in Sweden.
- 5 October – A new study of global warming shows that ocean heat content has been greatly underestimated in the Southern Hemisphere. As a result, the world's oceans are now absorbing between 24 and 58 per cent more energy than previously thought.
- 6 October – The Nobel Prize in Medicine was awarded to Edvard Moser, May-Britt Moser and John O'Keefe "for their discoveries of cells that constitute a positioning system in the brain" or, less formally, for finding an "inner GPS, in the brain".
- 7 October
  - The Nobel Prize in Physics was awarded to Isamu Akasaki, Hiroshi Amano and Shuji Nakamura for "the invention of efficient blue light-emitting diodes which has enabled bright and energy-saving white light sources" or, less formally, LED lights.
  - Due to landscape fragmentation, Brazil's rainforests are releasing one-fifth more carbon than previously thought.
- 8 October
  - The Nobel Prize in Chemistry was awarded to Eric Betzig, William Moerner and Stefan Hell for "the development of super-resolved fluorescence microscopy," which brings optical microscopy into the nanodimension.
  - Ocean acidification is causing nearly $1 trillion of damage to coral reefs each year, threatening the livelihoods of 400 million people, according to a report based on the work of 30 experts.
- 9 October
  - Harvard researchers have turned human embryonic stem cells into cells that produce insulin, a potentially major advance for sufferers of diabetes.
  - An international team of scientists has developed a slurry-based process using a porous powder suspended in glycol that offers a cost-effective and energy-efficient approach to carbon capture.
  - A new method has been devised to produce 3D metal nanoparticles in highly precise shapes and dimensions, using DNA as a construction mould.
  - New measurements of the Milky Way reveal there is half as much dark matter as previously thought, solving the 15-year-old "missing satellite galaxy" problem.
  - Drinking three cups of coffee a day can reduce the risk of abnormal liver enzyme levels by 25 percent, based on a study of 14,000 subjects.

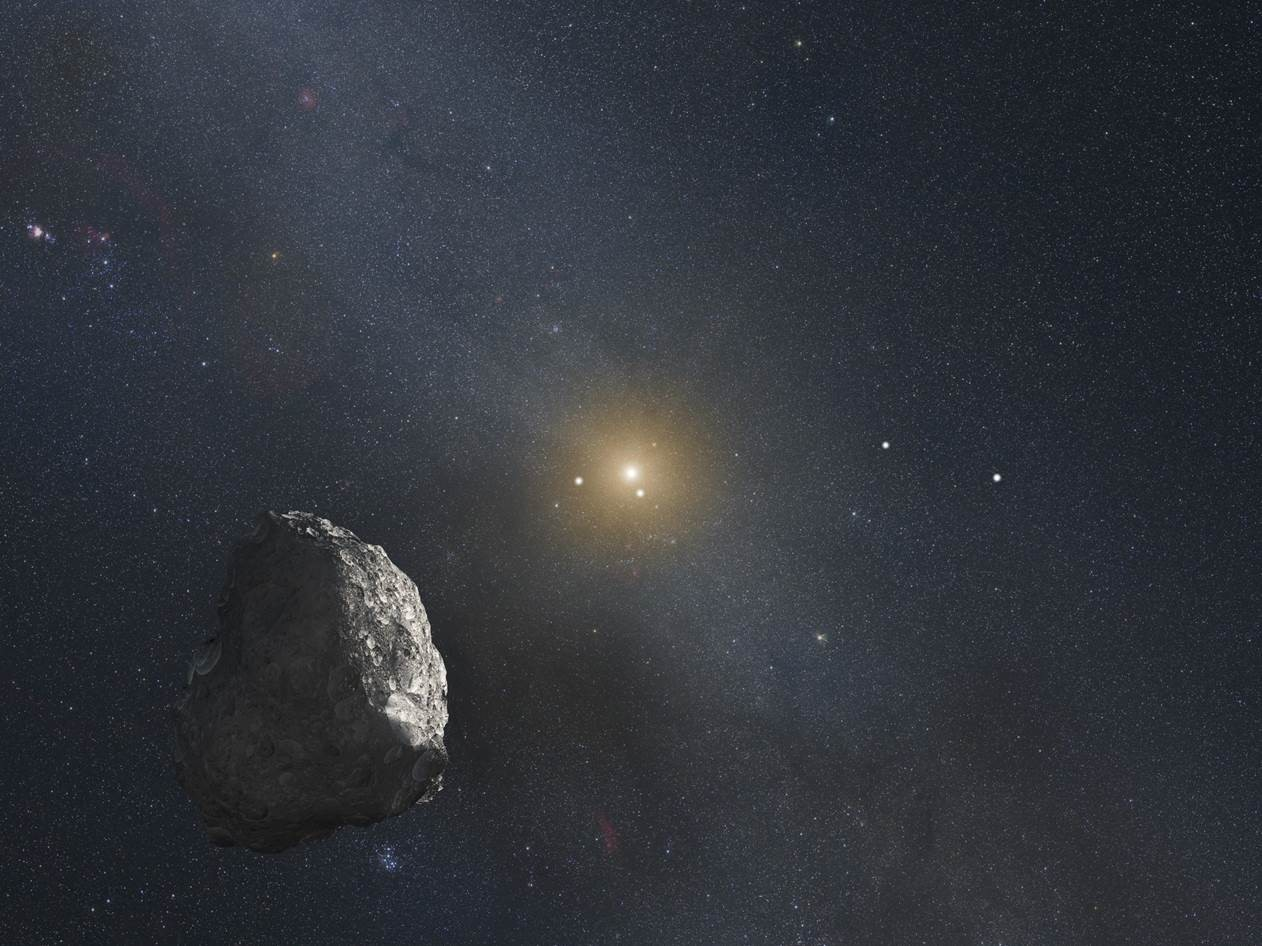
Kuiper belt object - possible target of New Horizons spacecraft (artist's concept).

- 12 October
  - The CDC confirms that a health care worker in Texas was found to be positive for the Ebola virus, the first known case of the disease to be contracted in the United States.
  - Researchers, for the first time, find a way of reproducing Alzheimer's cells in a Petri dish.
- 13 October
  - A new battery has been developed capable of being recharged up to 70 per cent in only two minutes. The battery also has a longer lifespan of over 20 years.
  - Samsung engineers have developed a way of transmitting Wi-Fi data five times faster than was previously possible.
- 14 October
  - Plants absorb 16% more CO_{2} than previously thought, according to research published in the journal PNAS.
  - Globally, September 2014 was the hottest September on record, according to NASA data. This follows the hottest May, June and August, also this year.
- 15 October
  - Lockheed Martin reports a significant breakthrough in generating nuclear fusion from a small-scale power plant.
  - NASA announces finding several Kuiper belt objects that may be targeted by the New Horizons spacecraft, presently expected to perform a flyby of the Pluto system on 14 July 2015.
- 16 October – Astronomers have detected what appears to be a signature of 'axions', which are predicted to be dark matter particle candidates. If confirmed, this would be the first direct detection and identification of the elusive substance.

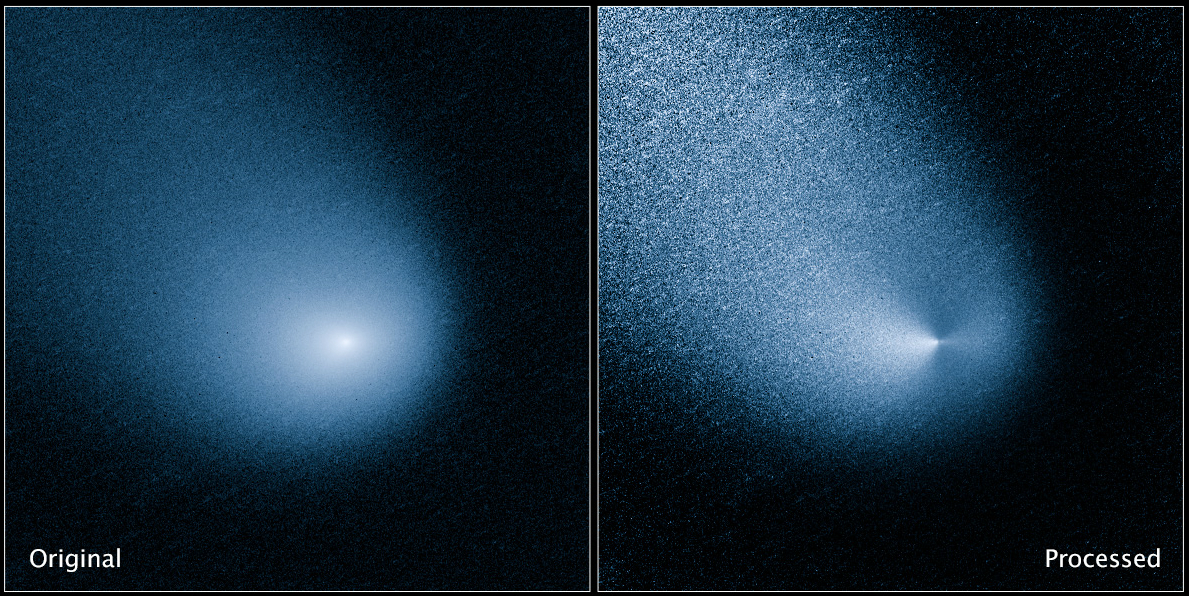
Comet Siding Spring passed near Mars on 19 October 2014 (Hubble; 11 March 2014).

- 17 October – Scientists at Bristol University have used quantum mechanics/molecular mechanics simulations to improve the understanding of antibiotic resistance, which may enable the design of better drugs in the future.
- 19 October – NASA reports that all Mars orbiters—including Mars Odyssey Orbiter, Mars Reconnaissance Orbiter and MAVEN—as well as, ESA's orbiter, Mars Express, and ISRO's satellite, the Mars Orbiter Mission, are healthy after the Comet Siding Spring flyby of planet Mars.
- 20 October
  - Physicists have built a reversible tractor beam that can move objects 0.2mm in diameter a distance of up to 20 centimetres. This is 100 times further than was possible in previous experiments.
  - By boosting a protein called NT3, scientists have restored lost hearing in mice.
- 21 October – Darek Fidyka, a paralysed Polish man, becomes the first in the world to walk again following a pioneering therapy which involved transplanting cells from his nose into his severed spinal cord.
- 22 October
  - A new method of solar cell production enables silicon to be used that is 1,000 times less pure and requires only one-third of the energy to manufacture compared to traditional methods. While the energy efficiency is currently too low (3.6%) for commercial use, this new process could be refined in the future, potentially slashing the cost of solar energy.
  - A new drug, OTS964, can eradicate aggressive human lung cancers transplanted into mice, with few side effects.
  - The discovery of the seventeenth experimentally established form of ice, ice XVI, is accepted for publication in Nature.
- 23 October – A partial solar eclipse occurs across most of North America.
- 24 October
  - Using stem cells from just 25 milliliters of blood, researchers have grown new blood vessels in just seven days, compared to a month for the same process using bone marrow. These blood vessels were implanted in patients to connect the gastrointestinal tract to the liver.
  - Scientists from Harvard Medical School report a new method of using toxic stem cells to attack brain tumors, without killing normal cells or themselves. The procedure could be ready for human clinical trials within five years.
  - NASA reports finding methane in polar clouds in the atmosphere of Titan, moon of the planet Saturn.
- 26 October – Iranian researchers devised an inexpensive, flexible microchip which is able to notice HIV and measure viral load in polluted individuals at the point-of-care.
- 27 October
  - The UK government has unveiled plans for a £97m ($156m) supercomputer to study weather and climate. Using 13 times more processing power than previous systems, it will perform 16,000 trillion calculations per second.
  - Researchers at the Eindhoven University of Technology have achieved 255 Terabits/s over a new type of fibre allowing 21 times more bandwidth than currently available in communication networks.
  - An international group of scientists has announced the most significant breakthrough in a decade toward developing DNA-based electrical circuits.
- 28 October
  - A new multi-scenario modelling of world human population concludes that even draconian fertility restrictions or a catastrophic mass mortality won't be enough to solve issues of global sustainability by 2100.
  - The latest Antares rocket, built by Orbital Sciences Corporation and intended to supply the International Space Station, explodes just after its 18:22 EDT (22:22 GMT) launch, completely destroying the vehicle and badly damaging launch pad 0 at the Mid-Atlantic Regional Spaceport.
- 29 October
  - Miniature human stomachs have been grown from stem cells, potentially offering a way to study ulcers and repair stomach damage in patients.
  - Hewlett-Packard (HP) has unveiled a 3D printer that it claims will be 10 times faster than current models.
  - A method for improving thrust generated by supersonic laser-propelled rockets has been described in The Optical Society's (OSA) journal Applied Optics.

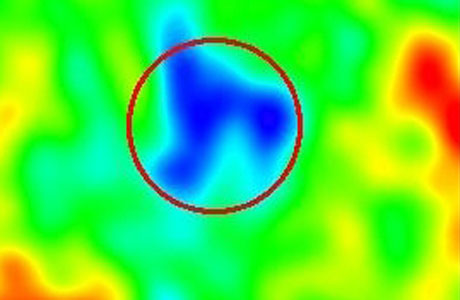
The CMB Cold Spot in a WMAP map of the cosmic microwave background

  - The Planck Collaboration publishes the peer-reviewed Planck 2013 results series in Astronomy & Astrophysics. The series includes a study confirming several large-scale anomalies previously observed by the WMAP, including the CMB cold spot, while finding no compelling evidence that they require physics beyond the standard cosmological model.
- 30 October – Researchers have demonstrated for the first time the in vitro growth of a piece of spinal cord in three dimensions from mouse embryonic stem cells.
- 31 October
  - The fastest ever integrated circuit is announced by DARPA, achieving one terahertz (10^{12} Hz), or a trillion cycles per second. This is 150 billion cycles faster than the existing world record of 850 gigahertz set in 2012.
  - Arachnophobia is cured by removing part of a man's brain.
  - During a test flight, Virgin Galactic's SpaceShipTwo experiences an in-flight anomaly followed by an explosion and crash in the Mojave desert, killing one pilot and injuring another.

=== November ===
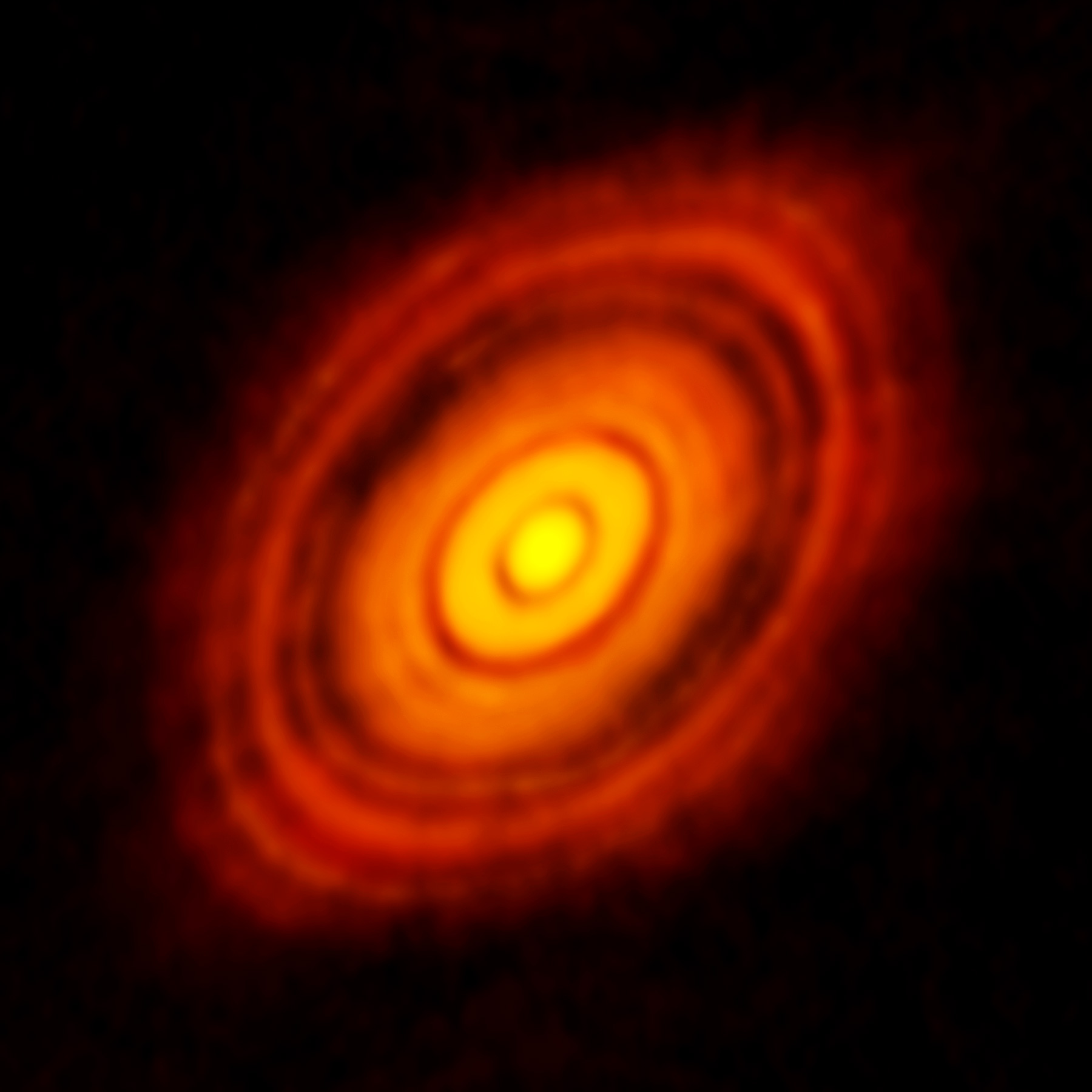
5 November 2014: ALMA image of HL Tauri.

- 2 November
  - The Intergovernmental Panel on Climate Change (IPCC) releases the final part of its Fifth Assessment Report, known as the Synthesis Report. This further discusses the possible future impacts of climate change and it is hoped will pave the way for a global, legally binding treaty in late 2015.
  - Scientists have engineered artificial nanoparticles made from lipids that can treat bacterial infections without antibiotics while simultaneously preventing antibiotic resistance.
- 5 November
  - The ALMA telescope reveals a protoplanetary disk in never-before-seen detail. A series of concentric rings are visible in the image, showing the likely orbits of young planets in the process of being formed.
  - A way to stop Ras proteins moving from the centre of a cell to the membrane, a fault common to one-third of cancers, is reported at the National Cancer Research Institute (NCRI) Cancer Conference in Liverpool.
  - A study by the U.S. Geological Survey predicts the likely habitat ranges of birds in the year 2075 based on climate, land use and land cover changes.
  - Basic wound healing has been advanced with a synthetic platelet that accumulates at sites of injury, clots and stops bleeding three times faster. The synthetic platelets have realistic size, disc-shape, flexibility, and the same surface proteins as real platelets.
- 6 November – Half of all stars may be found in the space between galaxies, according to a new study.
- 7 November
  - A study finds there is at least a 92% chance the ecosystem of the Leadbeater's possum in southern Australia will collapse within 50 years.
  - Researchers in Sweden report a "huge breakthrough" in Parkinson's disease using stem cells to restore neurons in rats. Clinical trials for humans are expected by 2017.
  - NASA reports that during the Comet Siding Spring flyby of planet Mars on 19 October 2014, orbiters around Mars detected thousands of kilograms per hour of comet dust composed of magnesium, iron, sodium, potassium, manganese, nickel, chromium and zinc. In addition, the comet nucleus was determined to be smaller than the expected 1.9 km (1.2 mi), and rotated once every eight hours.
- 10 November – President Obama recommends the FCC reclassify broadband Internet service as a telecommunications service in order to preserve net neutrality.
- 11 November
  - Australian researchers have uncovered how the massive DNA molecules that appear in some tumours are formed like Frankenstein's monster, stitched together from other parts of the genome. This solves a decades-old mystery and explains how these tumours ensure their own survival.
  - Iranian nanotechnologists researched the chance of nanotechnology uses in targeted drug delivery systems to therapy of cancer. This examine studied the creation of a nanodrug and its effects on the remedy of breast cancer. The goal of the scientist was to present curcumin nano-drug with a sluggish and effectual release model to heal breast cancer. Curcumin is a drug with anti-cancer and anti-inflammation properties. The drug is typically used orally or peripherally.

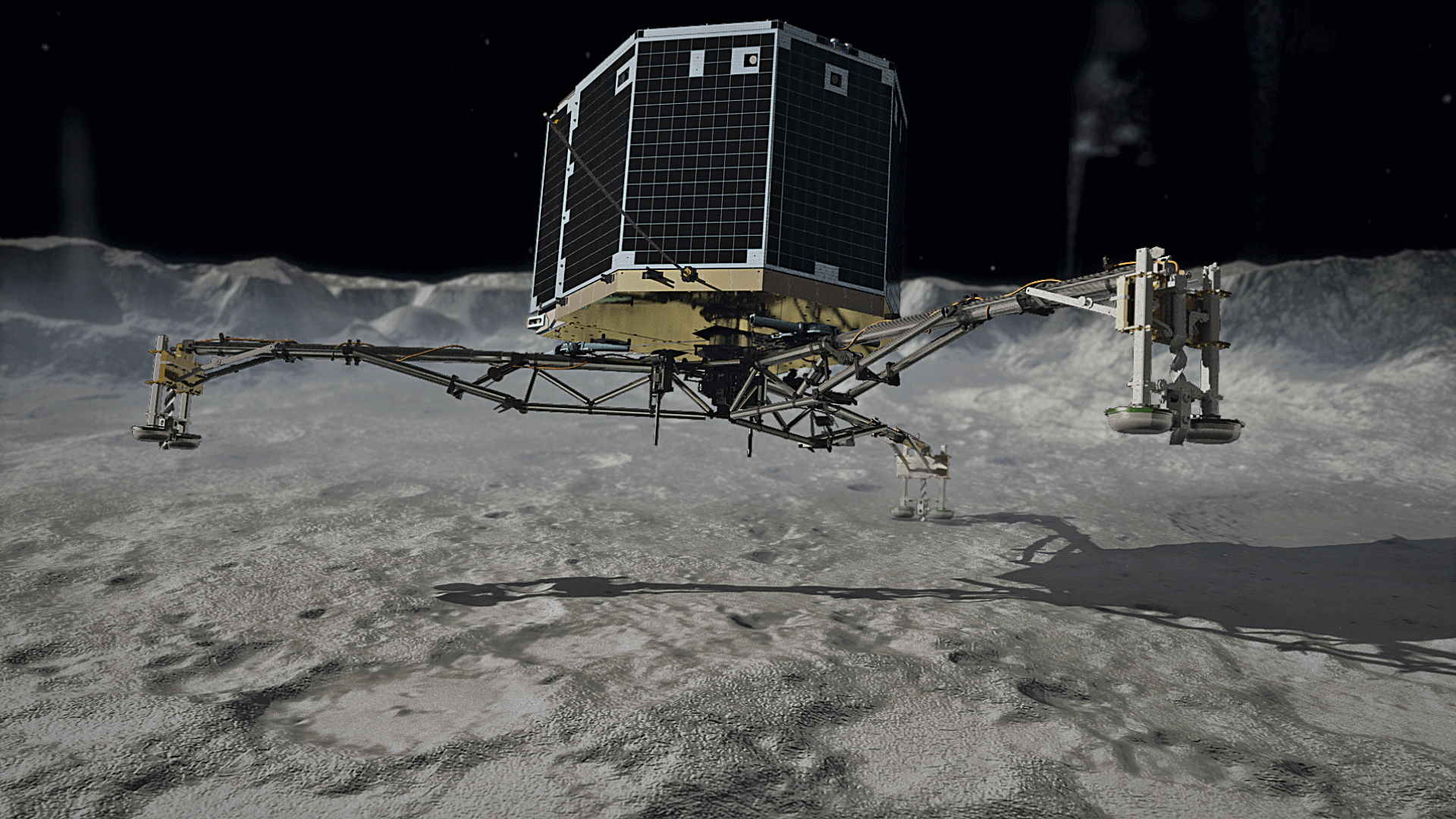
12 November 2014: The Philae probe from the Rosetta spacecraft lands successfully on the surface of Comet 67P.

- 12 November
  - The Philae probe from the Rosetta spacecraft lands successfully on the surface (at a site named Agilkia) of Comet 67P/Churyumov-Gerasimenko.
  - The genomes of the world's 17 oldest people have been published. Researchers were unable to find genes significantly associated with extreme longevity.
- 13 November – Global warming will cause lightning strikes to increase 50 percent by 2100, according to a study by the University of California - Berkeley.
- 14 November – The Japan Meteorological Agency (JMA) reports that October 2014 was by far the hottest October on record. This follows the hottest March–May, June, August and September, also this year.
- 17 November
  - A new AI software program developed by researchers at Google and Stanford University can recognise objects in photos and videos at near-human levels of understanding.
  - The strongest evidence yet that being gay is genetic has been uncovered in a detailed genetic analysis.
  - The Black seadevil Anglerfish is filmed in its natural habitat for the first time, using a remotely operated vehicle at a depth of 580 m (1,900 ft).
- 18 November – The Philae lander is reported to have detected organic molecules on the surface of Comet 67P/Churyumov-Gerasimenko.
- 24 November
  - The first detailed, high-resolution 3-D maps of Antarctic sea ice are developed using an underwater robot.
  - Having recently been on the verge of extinction, Snake River sockeye salmon populations have recovered. Their numbers are now high enough for the species to eventually sustain itself in the wild again, it is reported.
- 26 November
  - Graphene has been found to allow positively charged hydrogen atoms or protons to pass through it, despite being impermeable to all other gases, including hydrogen itself. This could lead to major improvements in clean energy technology.
  - An experimental vaccine to prevent Ebola has shown promising results in a Phase 1 clinical trial.
  - Researchers at Queen Mary, University of London, report a major breakthrough in treating advanced bladder cancer.
  - A new study finds that DNA can survive a flight through space and re-entry into Earth's atmosphere and still pass on genetic information. These results indicate that life and organic molecules could potentially spread between planetary bodies through meteor impacts.
- 29 November–Iranian scientists manage to produce a cancer cells annihilator tool that is able to remove cancer cells in an invasive process.

=== December ===
- 1 December
  - HIV is evolving into a less deadly and less infectious form as it spends more time infecting people, according to a major scientific study.
  - The first fossil of a carnivorous plant – an early ancestor of Roridula dating back 35 to 47 million years ago – has been reported.
  - Astronomers, at the Planck 2014 meeting in Ferrara, Italy, report that the universe is 13.8 billion years old and is composed of 4.9 percent atomic matter, 26.6 percent dark matter and 68.5 percent dark energy.
  - For the first time, 3D printing has been used to create functioning electronic circuitry made of semiconductors and other materials.
  - The world's first artificial enzymes have been created using synthetic biology.
- 2 December
  - DNA analysis confirms that a skeleton unearthed from a UK parking lot is the former king, Richard III, who died in 1485. This is the oldest DNA identification case of a known individual.
  - New research, using ultrasound, has developed a 3D haptic shape that can be seen and felt in mid-air.
  - A new solar cell efficiency record of 46% has been achieved by a French-German collaboration.
- 3 December
  - A decade-long study of 5,000 women has provided further evidence linking a Mediterranean diet to increased longevity.
  - The world's fastest receive-only 2-D camera has been demonstrated, capturing up to 100 billion frames per second. It is hoped this new system will improve the understanding of very fast biological interactions and chemical processes.
  - Japan launches its Hayabusa2 asteroid sample return mission.
  - Using new data from Kepler, an astrobiologist has attempted to update the Drake equation. It is estimated that a biotic planet may be expected within 10-100 light years from Earth, while the nearest intelligent life is probably a few thousand light years away.
- 4 December – Zig-zag patterns on a shell in Indonesia are believed to be 430,000 years old, making them the earliest known engravings by a human ancestor.
- 5 December
  - NASA successfully conducts the first uncrewed test flight of its Orion crewed spacecraft.
  - Universities and archives announce the release of Albert Einstein's papers, comprising more than 30,000 unique documents, available online at Digital Einstein.
- 8 December – Scientists have made progress towards developing an "obesity pill", by using stem cells to turn white, or "bad," fat cells into brown, or "good," fat cells. Two compounds have already been shown to achieve this in human cells.
- 10 December
  - Scientists report that the composition of water vapor from comet 67P/Churyumov-Gerasimenko, as determined by the Rosetta spacecraft, is substantially different from that found on Earth. That is, the ratio of deuterium to hydrogen in the water from the comet was determined to be three times that found for terrestrial water. This makes it very unlikely that water found on Earth came from comets such as comet 67P/Churyumov-Gerasimenko according to the scientists.
  - The U.S. Navy introduces a new laser weapon designed to protect ships without using ammunition.
  - A new "high-entropy" metal alloy has been developed with a higher strength-to-weight ratio than any other existing metal material.

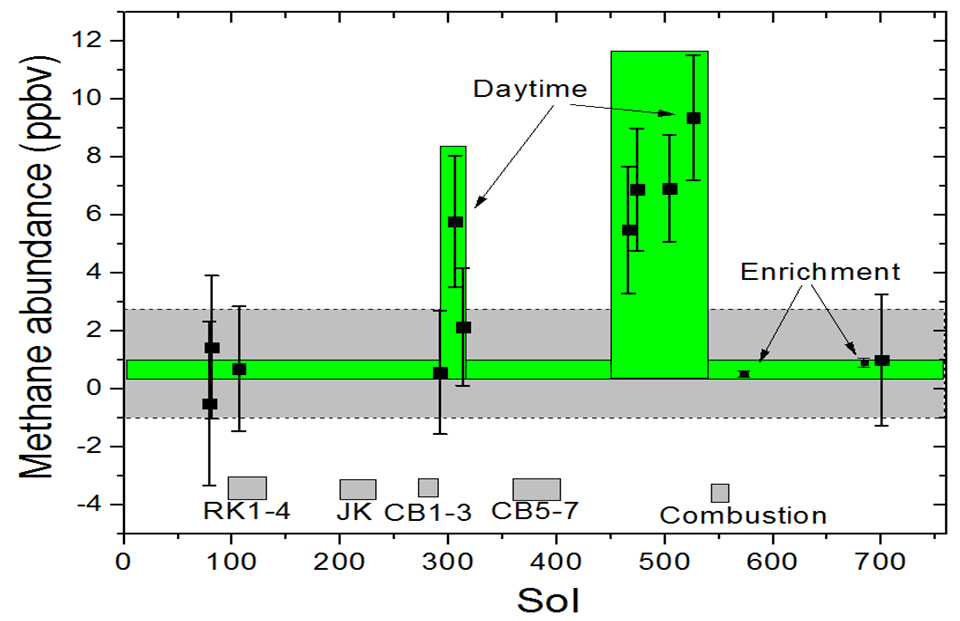
Methane measurements in the atmosphere of Mars by the Curiosity rover.

- 11 December – A weak, atypical photon emission in X-rays coming from space may be physical evidence of a dark matter particle, it is reported.
- 12 December – Iranian scientists of Tehran University created a drug nanosystem at laboratorial scale to acquire safe-to-eat insulin.
- 15 December
  - Satellite data reveals that the most dense stores of carbon in the Amazon basin are not above ground in trees but below ground in peatlands.
  - One of the six remaining northern white rhinoceros has died of old age at the San Diego Zoo in California, leaving only five in the entire world.
  - People who feel younger than their real age are more likely to live longer, according to research by University College London. Positive outlooks on life and aging, a sense of empowerment and will to live may explain the difference in life expectancy.
  - Iranian researchers Convert Curcumin Existing in Turmeric into safe-to-eat Nanodrug.
- 16 December
  - NASA reports detecting an unusual increase, then decrease, in the amounts of methane in the atmosphere of the planet Mars; in addition, organic chemicals are detected in powder drilled from a rock by the Curiosity rover. Also, based on deuterium to hydrogen ratio studies, much of the water at Gale Crater on Mars was found to have been lost during ancient times, before the lakebed in the crater was formed; afterwards, large amounts of water continued to be lost.
  - Stanford University announces "The One Hundred Year Study on Artificial Intelligence" (AI100).
  - By blocking the activity of an enzyme known as Granzyme b, researchers have slowed aging in the skin of mice.
- 17 December – A Colorado man becomes the first bilateral shoulder-level amputee to wear and simultaneously control two modular prosthetic limbs using his thoughts alone.
- 18 December
  - NASA announces the Kepler spacecraft, newly configured as the K2 mission, to produce better stability due to failures with reaction wheels, detected its first confirmed exoplanet, HIP 116454 b, a Super-Earth.
  - NASA's Orbiting Carbon Observatory (OCO-2), launched on 2 July, returns its first global maps of the greenhouse gas CO_{2}.
  - Regular doses of ibuprofen can extend the lifespan of yeast, worms and flies by 15 percent, it is reported.
  - Iranian scientists go up the important properties of super capacitors, including power, energy and life-span by applying nanotechnology. Outcomes of the study have applications in medical, data and power industries.
- 19 December – A new species of fish is discovered in the Mariana Trench at a depth of 8,145 m (26,722 ft); beating the previous record for the world's deepest fish by nearly 500 m (1,600 ft).
- 23 December – A new treatment for arthritis involving the use of implanted bio-electronics is announced. More than half of patients using the device saw a dramatic reduction in symptoms. It is believed the treatment could be widely used within 10 years.
- 24 December
  - Scientists have discovered rods and cones preserved for 300 million years in a fossilised fish eye – the first time that fossilised photoreceptors from a vertebrate eye have ever been seen.
  - The results of a study into police body cameras show that the technology can significantly reduce both excessive use-of-force by officers and complaints against officers by the public.
- 26 December – Moscow State University has announced the creation of a DNA bank to store genetic samples from every living thing on Earth. The facility, funded by the country's largest ever scientific grant, will be opened in 2018.
- 29 December – Iranian researchers produce silver nanoparticles from eucalyptus extract. The goal of the study was to make silver nanoparticles from herbal tissue of a special sort of eucalyptus, and to research operation circumstances on the volume of particles.
- 31 December – For the first time, a frog species – Limnonectes larvaepartus – is discovered giving live birth to tadpoles, as opposed to frogspawn or froglets.

=== Undated ===
- Researchers prove that avian dinosaurs (birds) regularly got smaller and finer boned over time.
- Researchers claim alcoholic beverage causes successful aging for women.

== Deaths ==
- 4 January – Shirley Jeffrey, 74, Australian biologist and academic
- 12 January – William Feindel, 95, Canadian neurosurgeon, scientist and professor
- 25 January – John R. Huizenga, 92, American nuclear physicist
- 29 January – Robert Resnick, 91, American physicist, academic and author
- 15 February – Thelma Estrin, 89, American computer scientist and biomedical engineer
- 18 February – Forman S. Acton, 93, American computer scientist, author and academic
- 3 March – Joab Thomas, 81, American university administrator and scientist
- 29 March – Ruth A. M. Schmidt, 97, American geologist
- 1 May – Radhia Cousot, 67, French computer scientist, co-inventor of abstract interpretation
- 4 May – Edgar Cortright, 90, American scientist and engineer, NASA senior official
- 7 May – Colin Pillinger, 70, English planetary scientist
- 8 May – Roger L. Easton, 93, American scientist, principal inventor and designer of the Global Positioning System (GPS)
- 17 May – Gerald Edelman, 84, American scientist, recipient of the 1972 Nobel Prize in Physiology or Medicine for work on understanding the structure of antibodies
- 6 June – Lorna Wing, 85, English psychiatrist
- 18 June – Stephanie Kwolek, 90, American chemist, National Medal of Technology laureate, inventor of Kevlar
- 27 August – Xia Peisu, 91, Chinese computer scientist
- 2 September – William Merton, 96, British military scientist and banker
- 15 November – Max Birnstiel, 81, Swiss molecular biologist
- 3 December – Nathaniel Branden, 84, Canadian American psychotherapist
- 18 December – Robert Simpson, 102, American meteorologist and co-developer of the Saffir-Simpson Hurricane Scale
- 25 December – Mary F. Lyon, 89, British geneticist

== See also ==
- 2014 in spaceflight
- List of emerging technologies
- List of years in science
