= List of fast rotators (minor planets) =

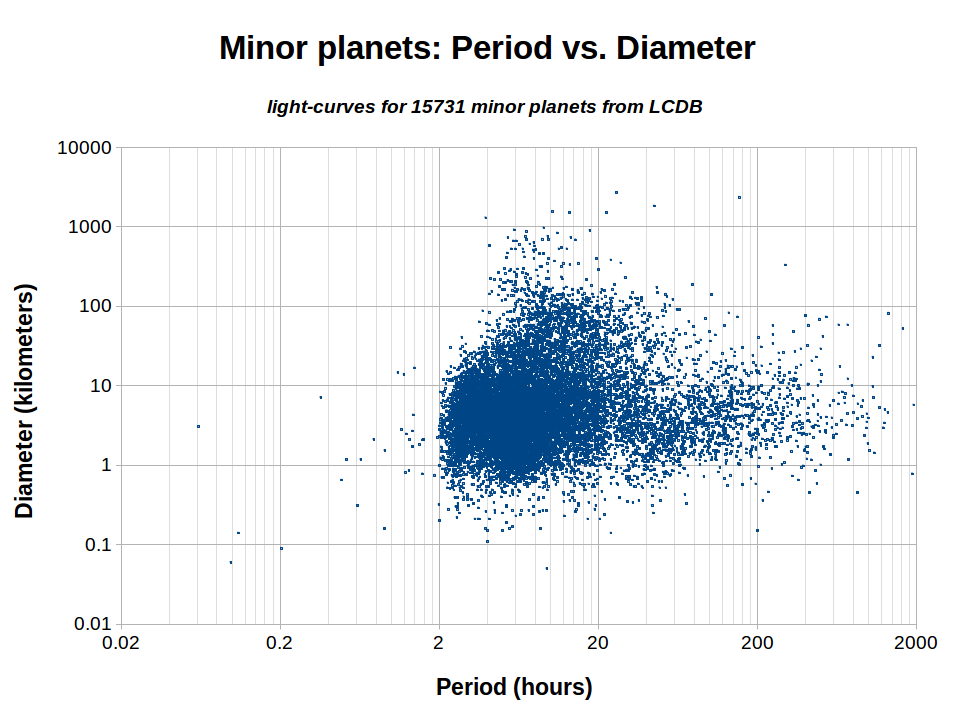
This plot shows the distribution of rotation periods for 15,000 minor planets as of September 2016, plotted against their diameters. Most bodies have a period between 2 and 20 hours. (Note: Data source, reference: Warner, B.D., Harris, A.W., Pravec, P. (2009). Icarus 202, 134-146. Updated 2016 September 6. See: www.MinorPlanet.info)

This is a list of fast rotators—"minor planets" (which includes asteroids) that have an exceptionally short rotation period, i.e. high rotation rate or spin rate. In some cases the rotation period is not constant because the object tumbles (see List of tumblers). In this list the periods are sourced from the Light Curve Data Base (LCDB), and are given in both seconds and hours.

Most minor planets have rotation periods between 2 and 20 hours. As of 2019, a group of 887 bodies – most of them were stony near-Earth asteroids with small diameters of barely 1 kilometre – had an estimated period of less than 2.2 hours. According to the Minor Planet Center, most small bodies were thought to be rubble piles – conglomerations of smaller pieces, loosely coalesced under the influence of gravity. Bodies with a period below 2.2 hours – known as the "cohesionless spin-barrier" – couldn't be merely held together by self-gravity, but must be formed of a contiguous solid, as they would fly apart otherwise. Via the deduction of strength boundary limits, rotation periods give an insight into the body's internal composition, and, from its degree of fracture, its collisional history can be inferred.

Bodies with an uncertain period are displayed in dark-grey. They have an Asteroid Lightcurve Database (LCDB) quality code, U, of less than 2, which corresponds to an estimated error margin of larger than 30%. A trailing plus sign (+) or minus sign (−) indicate slightly better or worse quality, respectively, than the unsigned value. This list also includes a small group of bodies which have no provisional designation in the LCDB.

== Periods <0.02 hour ==
#	Minor planet designation	Rotation period		Max amplitude (Δmag)	Quality (U)	Present orbit classification	Diameter (m) (Note: Calculated from an assumed albedo of 0.05–0.25)	Abs. mag (H)	Refs
#	Minor planet designation	(seconds)	(hours)	Max amplitude (Δmag)	Quality (U)	Present orbit classification	Diameter (m)	Abs. mag (H)	Refs
1.	2020 HS7	3.0	0.000832	0.07		Apollo	4–8	29.1	· MPC
2.	2017 QG_{18}	11.9	0.003298	0.21	2+	Apollo	10–23	27.0	LCDB · MPC
3.	2019 BE5	12.0	0.003328	1.60	3	Aten	25–56	25.1	LCDB · MPC
4.	2021 CC_{7}	13.5	0.003754	0.24		Apollo	2–6	29.8	· MPC
5.	2021 CA_{6}	14.3	0.003977	0.69		Apollo	5–11	28.5	· MPC
6.	2021 UF_{12}	14.9	0.004128	0.51		Apollo	3–8	29.3	· MPC
7.	2021 TY_{14}	15.3	0.004248	0.61		Apollo	9–21	27.2	· MPC
8.	2021 CG	15.3	0.004249	0.27		Apollo	16–35	26.1	· MPC
9.	2017 FK	15.4	0.00428	0.30	2	Apollo	8–19	27.4	LCDB · MPC
10.	2021 HN	15.7	0.004358	0.74	3–	Apollo	11–24	26.9	LCDB · MPC
11.	2014 RC	15.8	0.004389	0.10		Apollo	11–25	26.8	LCDB · MPC
12.	2015 SV_{6}	17.6	0.00490	0.74	2	Apollo	7–17	27.7	LCDB · MPC
13.	2016 MA	18.4	0.0051	0.12	1+	Apollo	8–18	27.5	LCDB · MPC
14.	2021 GQ_{10}	19.3	0.005363	0.19		Aten	12–28	26.6	· MPC
15.	2020 PY_{2}	19.8	0.005510	0.28		Apollo	13–29	26.5	· MPC
16.	2021 UW_{1}	21.1	0.005862	1.20		Apollo	15–34	26.2	· MPC
17.	2010 JL88	24.6	0.006830	0.52	3	Apollo	11–25	26.8	LCDB · MPC
18.	2017 EE_{4}	25.2	0.00699	0.31	2	Apollo	26–59	25.0	LCDB · MPC
19.	2020 SW	28.5	0.007904	0.73		Aten	4–8	29.1	· MPC
20.	2020 TD_{8}	29.5	0.008203	1.19		Apollo	11–24	26.9	· MPC
21.	2018 UD_{3}	29.7	0.008256	0.55		Apollo	15–34	26.2	· MPC
22.	2017 EK	29.9	0.0083	1.59	2	Apollo	40–89	24.1	LCDB · MPC
23.	2016 AD_{166}	30.6	0.0085	0.21	2	Apollo	50–113	23.6	LCDB · MPC
24.	2010 WA	30.9	0.00858	0.22	3	Apollo	2–5	30.0	LCDB · MPC
25.	2017 UK_{8}	31.1	0.008631	1.30	3	Apollo	6–13	28.2	LCDB · MPC
26.	2016 GE_{1}	34.0	0.009438	0.13	2	Apollo	12–28	26.6	LCDB · MPC
27.	2008 HJ	42.7	0.01185	0.80	3−	Apollo	18–41	25.8	LCDB · MPC
28.	2009 TM_{8}	43.2	0.012			Apollo	5–12	28.4	LCDB · MPC
29.	(867840) 2016 AO_{131}	44.3	0.0123	0.20	2−	Apollo	40–89	24.1	LCDB · MPC
30.	2016 GS_{2}	45.6	0.01266	0.11	3−	Apollo	66–149	23.0	LCDB · MPC
31.	2020 KK_{7}	45.6	0.012673	1.44		Apollo	15–34	26.2	· MPC
32.	2015 SU	45.7	0.0127	0.20	2−	Amor	22–49	25.4	LCDB · MPC
33.	2020 HT_{7}	45.8	0.012722	0.38		Amor	11–24	26.9	· MPC
34.	2014 TP_{57}	49.3	0.0137	0.16	2−	Amor	15–34	26.2	LCDB · MPC
35.	2021 DW1	49.5	0.013760	0.48		Apollo	30	25.0	· MPC

back to top

== Periods 0.02–0.05 hour ==
#	Minor planet designation	Rotation period		Δmag	Quality (U)	Orbit or family	Spectral type	Diameter (km)	Abs. mag (H)	Refs
#	Minor planet designation	(seconds)	(hours)	Δmag	Quality (U)	Orbit or family	Spectral type	Diameter (km)	Abs. mag (H)	Refs
31.	2007 KE_{4}	77	0.021408	0.38	3−	NEO	S	0.03	25.20	LCDB · MPC
32.	2016 AV_{164}	78	0.0216	0.45	2	NEO	S	0.03	24.90	LCDB · MPC
33.	2014 GQ_{17}	78	0.0217	0.08	2−	NEO	S	0.01	27.10	LCDB · MPC
34.	2000 DO_{8}	78	0.0217	1.39	3	NEO	S	0.04	24.54	LCDB · MPC
35.	2014 TV	79	0.02190	0.32	2	NEO	S	0.04	24.40	LCDB · MPC
36.	2000 WH_{10}	80	0.02221	0.66	3−	NEO	S	0.09	22.50	LCDB · MPC
37.	2012 HG_{2}	82	0.0227	–	n.a.	NEO	S	0.01	27.00	LCDB · MPC
38.	2010 TD54	83	0.0229317	0.92	3	NEO	S	0.01	28.90	LCDB · MPC
39.	2016 RD_{34}	83	0.0230	0.45	2−	NEO	S	0.01	27.60	LCDB · MPC
40.	2010 TS_{19}	83	0.023	–	n.a.	NEO	S	0.02	25.70	LCDB · MPC
41.	2009 UD	84	0.023246	0.66	2+	NEO	S	0.01	27.20	LCDB · MPC
42.	2014 WB_{366}	86	0.0238	0.46	2+	NEO	S	0.03	24.80	LCDB · MPC
43.	2014 HB_{177}	86	0.0239	1.05	2	NEO	S	0.01	28.10	LCDB · MPC
44.	2014 TM_{34}	90	0.0249	0.17	2	NEO	S	0.03	25.00	LCDB · MPC
45.	2015 RF_{36}	90	0.025	0.14	2	NEO	S	0.06	23.40	LCDB · MPC
46.	2015 AK_{45}	93	0.0258	0.24	2	NEO	S	0.02	26.40	LCDB · MPC
47.	2010 XE_{11}	96	0.0265846	0.50	3	NEO	S	0.08	23.00	LCDB · MPC
48.	2000 UK_{11}	96	0.026599	0.28	2	NEO	S	0.03	25.30	LCDB · MPC
49.	2016 RB_{1}	96	0.0267	0.21	3−	NEO	S	0.01	28.30	LCDB · MPC
50.	2015 CM	96	0.0268	0.53	3−	NEO	S	0.02	26.10	LCDB · MPC
51.	2008 TC3	97	0.0269409	1.02	3	NEO	F	0.00	30.90	LCDB · MPC
52.	2016 AF_{166}	100	0.0278	0.41	2−	NEO	S	0.03	25.40	LCDB · MPC
53.	2017 LE	101	0.0281	0.38	3−	NEO	S	0.02	26.40	LCDB · MPC
54.	2010 KK_{37}	102	0.0284254	0.30	3−	NEO	S	0.02	25.70	LCDB · MPC
55.	2006 HW_{50}	105	0.0291	0.32	3−	NEO	S	0.04	24.40	LCDB · MPC
56.	2001 UC_{5}	106	0.02931	0.11	1	NEO	X	0.31	21.30	LCDB · MPC
57.	2015 KM_{120}	107	0.0296	0.19	2	NEO	S	0.03	24.70	LCDB · MPC
58.	2010 VK_{139}	108	0.0299522	0.50	3	NEO	S	0.05	23.70	LCDB · MPC
59.	2013 BS45	108	0.03	–	n.a.	NEO	S	0.02	25.90	LCDB · MPC
60.	2003 EM_{1}	111	0.030968	0.62	1+	NEO	S	0.04	24.50	LCDB · MPC
61.	2010 GF_{7}	115	0.03181	0.80	2−	NEO	S	0.02	25.90	LCDB · MPC
62.	2007 RS_{146}	116	0.03209	0.35	2	NEO	S	0.07	23.30	LCDB · MPC
63.	2015 QB	118	0.0327	0.11	2	NEO	S	0.04	24.20	LCDB · MPC
64.	2009 SH_{15}	119	0.033	–	n.a.	NEO	S	0.04	24.50	LCDB · MPC
65.	2015 JD	122	0.0339	0.07	2	NEO	S	0.02	25.50	LCDB · MPC
66.	2009 QH_{34}	123	0.034303	0.50	2+	NEO	S	0.03	24.90	LCDB · MPC
67.	2015 CG	127	0.0353	1.50	2	NEO	S	0.02	25.60	LCDB · MPC
68.	2017 KJ_{27}	130	0.036	0.58	3−	NEO	S	0.03	25.40	LCDB · MPC
69.	2000 WS_{28}	131	0.03646	0.36	3−	NEO	S	0.06	23.60	LCDB · MPC
70.	2014 UX_{7}	132	0.0366	0.40	2	NEO	S	0.02	25.60	LCDB · MPC
71.	2014 HN_{178}	132	0.0367	0.95	2+	NEO	S	0.06	23.50	LCDB · MPC
72.	2009 SN_{103}	133	0.037	–	n.a.	NEO	S	0.01	27.60	LCDB · MPC
73.	2015 VE_{66}	133	0.037	0.38	3−	NEO	S	0.05	24.10	LCDB · MPC
74.	2015 TC25	134	0.03715	0.40	3	NEO	S	0.00	29.30	LCDB · MPC
75.	2015 EP	137	0.0381	0.10	1+	NEO	S	0.02	26.00	LCDB · MPC
76.	2012 UX_{136}	137	0.03811	0.85	2−	NEO	S	0.02	25.60	LCDB · MPC
77.	2015 SZ_{2}	138	0.03832	0.32	3	NEO	S	0.03	25.40	LCDB · MPC
78.	2015 VY_{105}	138	0.0384	0.96	3	NEO	S	0.01	29.00	LCDB · MPC
79.	2014 VG_{2}	139	0.0385	0.08	2+	NEO	S	0.09	22.70	LCDB · MPC
80.	2016 FZ_{2}	139	0.0387	0.26	2−	NEO	S	0.04	24.60	LCDB · MPC
81.	1999 SF10	148	0.0411	0.58	2	NEO	S	0.05	24.00	LCDB · MPC
82.	2012 KP24	150	0.041667	1.00	3	NEO	C	0.02	26.61	LCDB · MPC
83.	2015 DT	153	0.0426	0.20	2−	NEO	S	0.08	22.90	LCDB · MPC
84.	(515082) 2010 TM_{3}	155	0.043081	0.55	1	NEO	S	0.23	20.60	LCDB · List
85.	2014 KH_{39}	158	0.0440	2.79	2	NEO	S	0.02	26.20	LCDB · MPC
86.	2007 LT	160	0.044583	0.53	3−	NEO	S	0.09	22.60	LCDB · MPC
87.	2009 KL_{8}	161	0.0447	0.75	2−	NEO	S	0.04	24.30	LCDB · MPC
88.	2001 WV_{1}	162	0.0449	0.38	2	NEO	S	0.09	22.50	LCDB · MPC
89.	2006 DD_{1}	164	0.0456	0.93	3−	NEO	S	0.02	26.50	LCDB · MPC
90.	2006 RH120	165	0.04583	1.10	2	NEO	S	0.00	29.90	LCDB · MPC
91.	2009 WB	166	0.046	–	n.a.	NEO	S	0.04	24.20	LCDB · MPC
92.	2015 HR_{1}	168	0.0467	0.60	2+	NEO	S	0.04	24.30	LCDB · MPC
93.	2008 YY_{32}	173	0.048	–	n.a.	NEO	S	0.03	25.20	LCDB · MPC
94.	2009 DO_{111}	176	0.04890	1.22	3	NEO	S	0.08	22.80	LCDB · MPC
95.	2012 BF_{86}	177	0.0491	0.34	2	NEO	S	0.09	22.60	LCDB · MPC
96.	2009 HK_{73}	180	0.049989	0.23	2	NEO	S	0.02	26.30	LCDB · MPC

back to top

== Periods 0.05–0.1 hour ==
#	Minor planet designation	Rotation period		Δmag	Quality (U)	Orbit or family	Spectral type	Diameter (km)	Abs. mag (H)	Refs
#	Minor planet designation	(seconds)	(hours)	Δmag	Quality (U)	Orbit or family	Spectral type	Diameter (km)	Abs. mag (H)	Refs
97.	2004 FH	181	0.0504	1.16	3	NEO	S	0.02	25.70	LCDB · MPC
98.	2016 CS_{247}	185	0.0514	0.12	2	NEO	S	0.02	25.50	LCDB · MPC
99.	2012 TV	189	0.0525	0.48	3−	NEO	S	0.03	25.20	LCDB · MPC
100.	2010 UJ_{7}	191	0.05305	0.90	2−	NEO	S	0.03	25.40	LCDB · MPC
101.	2008 JL_{24}	194	0.05385	0.60	3−	NEO	S	0.00	29.60	LCDB · MPC
102.	2017 MO_{8}	196	0.0544	1.58	3	NEO	S	0.02	26.00	LCDB · MPC
103.	2015 KE	202	0.0562	0.17	2−	NEO	S	0.02	26.20	LCDB · MPC
104.	2004 BV_{18}	203	0.0565	0.22	3−	NEO	S	0.02	25.90	LCDB · MPC
105.	2009 KW_{2}	205	0.05686	0.70	3−	NEO	S	0.01	26.60	LCDB · MPC
106.	2018 JX	207	0.057637	0.31	3	NEO	S	0.06	23.40	LCDB · MPC
107.	2013 SB_{21}	210	0.0584	0.83	2	NEO	S	0.01	27.00	LCDB · MPC
108.	2015 CB_{1}	212	0.0589	0.36	2	NEO	S	0.02	25.50	LCDB · MPC
109.	2007 GQ_{3}	217	0.0602	0.54	3−	NEO	S	0.12	22.00	LCDB · MPC
110.	2013 XY8	218	0.06055	0.47	3−	NEO	S	0.03	25.00	LCDB · MPC
111.	2012 KT42	218	0.06057	0.60	3	NEO	S	0.01	28.79	LCDB · MPC
112.	(305454) 2008 DP_{4}	219	0.0607	–	n.a.	MBA (outer)	C	3.20	16.20	LCDB · List
113.	2017 EH_{4}	225	0.0624	0.56	3−	NEO	S	0.05	24.10	LCDB · MPC
114.	2001 SQ_{3}	225	0.06248	0.39	3−	NEO	S	0.14	21.60	LCDB · MPC
115.	2013 TG_{6}	227	0.0631	0.18	3	NEO	S	0.01	26.60	LCDB · MPC
116.	2009 EW	229	0.06363	1.50	2−	NEO	S	0.02	26.40	LCDB · MPC
117.	2014 HW	231	0.0641	1.16	2	NEO	S	0.01	28.40	LCDB · MPC
118.	2015 KO_{122}	233	0.0648	0.17	2	NEO	S	0.01	27.00	LCDB · MPC
119.	(285625) 2000 RD_{34}	234	0.065	0.08	1+	NEO	S	0.82	17.80	LCDB · List
120.	2014 UY	237	0.0658	0.87	3−	NEO	S	0.03	25.40	LCDB · MPC
121.	2017 LD	238	0.0660	0.47	3−	NEO	S	0.01	27.50	LCDB · MPC
122.	(27346) 2000 DN_{8}	245	0.068	0.10	1	NEO	Q	1.96	15.90	LCDB · List
123.	2016 JP_{17}	253	0.070176	0.65	3	NEO	S	0.07	23.10	LCDB · MPC
124.	2008 UT_{5}	256	0.07123	0.38	2−	NEO	S	0.04	24.50	LCDB · MPC
125.	2015 TL_{238}	257	0.0713	0.46	2	NEO	S	0.03	24.90	LCDB · MPC
126.	2014 JD	257	0.0714	0.18	2−	NEO	S	0.02	26.30	LCDB · MPC
127.	2015 EO	263	0.073	0.39	3−	NEO	S	0.01	26.80	LCDB · MPC
128.	2015 EK	265	0.0737	0.17	3−	NEO	S	0.02	26.30	LCDB · MPC
129.	2007 DA	266	0.074	0.99	2	NEO	S	0.10	22.40	LCDB · MPC
130.	2007 DD	267	0.07429	0.70	2+	NEO	S	0.02	25.90	LCDB · MPC
131.	2014 NL_{52}	267	0.0743	0.51	3	NEO	S	0.06	23.60	LCDB · MPC
132.	2015 SW_{6}	271	0.0752	0.32	2	NEO	S	0.04	24.50	LCDB · MPC
133.	2008 CC_{71}	272	0.07561	0.40	1	NEO	S	0.03	24.90	LCDB · MPC
134.	2015 DU	274	0.076	0.05	2−	NEO	S	0.01	26.60	LCDB · MPC
135.	2009 WV_{51}	276	0.07660	1.00	2+	NEO	S	0.01	27.10	LCDB · MPC
136.	2000 AG_{6}	276	0.0766	0.80	3	NEO	S	0.03	24.80	LCDB · MPC
137.	2008 UR_{2}	299	0.083	–	n.a.	NEO	S	0.01	27.00	LCDB · MPC
138.	2006 XY	299	0.0830902	1.33	3	NEO	S	0.04	24.20	LCDB · MPC
139.	2016 DV1	303	0.084148	1.02	3	NEO	S	0.03	24.80	LCDB · MPC
140.	2006 AM_{4}	305	0.0847	1.01	3	NEO	S	0.13	21.80	LCDB · MPC
141.	2016 EN_{156}	311	0.0863	0.44	2−	NEO	S	0.01	27.80	LCDB · MPC
142.	2017 BJ_{30}	314	0.0871	0.89	2+	NEO	S	0.01	26.70	LCDB · MPC
143.	2017 HV_{3}	317	0.0881	0.77	3	NEO	S	0.05	23.70	LCDB · MPC
144.	2014 HE_{177}	323	0.0897	0.25	2−	NEO	S	0.02	25.80	LCDB · MPC
145.	2015 KQ_{120}	323	0.0898	0.98	2	NEO	S	0.01	26.70	LCDB · MPC
146.	2014 KQ_{84}	338	0.0938	0.37	2+	NEO	S	0.01	26.70	LCDB · MPC
147.	2013 QR_{1}	338	0.094	0.55	3−	NEO	S	0.14	21.60	LCDB · MPC
148.	2009 BO_{5}	342	0.095	–	n.a.	NEO	S	0.01	26.80	LCDB · MPC
149.	2006 MV_{1}	342	0.0951	1.14	2	NEO	S	0.01	26.80	LCDB · MPC
150.	2014 UD_{57}	345	0.0959	0.90	3−	NEO	S	0.02	25.80	LCDB · MPC
151.	(614316) 2008 YZ_{32}	347	0.0963683	0.39	3	NEO	S	0.28	20.10	LCDB · List
152.	2006 HX_{30}	348	0.0966	0.41	2+	NEO	S	0.02	26.20	LCDB · MPC
153.	2010 WA_{9}	349	0.097	1.30	2+	NEO	S	0.02	25.60	LCDB · MPC
154.	(459872) 2014 EK_{24}	352	0.0978	1.26	3	NEO	S	0.07	23.30	LCDB · List
155.	2017 QW_{1}	355	0.0987	0.30	2	NEO	S	0.02	26.20	LCDB · MPC
156.	2013 WS_{43}	356	0.0988	0.39	2	NEO	S	0.09	22.70	LCDB · MPC

back to top

== Periods 0.1–0.5 hour ==
#	Minor planet designation	Rotation period		Δmag	Quality (U)	Orbit or family	Spectral type	Diameter (km)	Abs. mag (H)	Refs
#	Minor planet designation	(seconds)	(hours)	Δmag	Quality (U)	Orbit or family	Spectral type	Diameter (km)	Abs. mag (H)	Refs
157.	2011 BG_{24}	360	0.1	–	n.a.	NEO	S	0.01	26.60	LCDB · MPC
158.	2015 XF	361	0.1003	0.51	2	NEO	S	0.04	24.40	LCDB · MPC
159.	2007 BD	362	0.10065	0.32	3	NEO	S	0.03	25.40	LCDB · MPC
160.	2007 LW_{19}	366	0.10169	0.60	3	NEO	S	0.06	23.50	LCDB · MPC
161.	2014 FF	372	0.1032	0.49	2+	NEO	S	0.04	24.20	LCDB · MPC
162.	(482250) 2011 LL_{2}	372	0.1032	–	n.a.	NEO	S	0.31	19.90	LCDB · List
163.	2014 HF_{5}	374	0.1038	0.08	1	NEO	S	0.03	25.30	LCDB · MPC
164.	2017 EE_{3}	378	0.1050	0.90	2	NEO	S	0.02	26.00	LCDB · MPC
165.	2009 FH	386	0.1073	0.30	3	NEO	S	0.01	26.60	LCDB · MPC
166.	(523817) 2009 TK	389	0.10794	0.28	3	NEO	S	0.10	22.30	LCDB · List
167.	(471240) 2011 BT15	393	0.109138	0.61	3	NEO	S	0.14	21.70	LCDB · List
168.	2011 AL_{37}	393	0.10926	0.37	3	NEO	S	0.04	24.30	LCDB · MPC
169.	(863778) 2014 VQ	418	0.116030	0.62	3	NEO	S	0.26	20.30	LCDB · MPC
170.	2003 WT_{153}	421	0.117	0.16	2	NEO	S	0.01	28.00	LCDB · MPC
171.	2017 VC	426	0.118409	0.46	3	NEO	S	0.07	23.20	LCDB · MPC
172.	2005 UE_{1}	432	0.12	2.00	1	NEO	S	0.02	26.20	LCDB · MPC
173.	2014 KA_{91}	432	0.120	0.42	2	NEO	S	0.02	25.50	LCDB · MPC
174.	2014 DX110	433	0.12041	0.37	2+	NEO	S	0.02	25.70	LCDB · MPC
175.	1999 TY_{2}	437	0.1213	0.68	3	NEO	S	0.07	23.10	LCDB · MPC
176.	2011 GP_{59}	441	0.12251	2.00	3−	NEO	S	0.04	24.30	LCDB · MPC
177.	2018 LK	443	0.122960	0.55	3	NEO	S	0.14	21.70	LCDB · MPC
178.	2009 UU_{1}	445	0.12367	2.20	3	NEO	S	0.03	24.70	LCDB · MPC
179.	1999 SH_{10}	455	0.1264	0.29	3−	NEO	S	0.09	22.60	LCDB · MPC
180.	2009 HM_{82}	457	0.1270467	1.03	3	NEO	S	0.09	22.60	LCDB · MPC
181.	2007 EV	463	0.12874	0.40	1	NEO	S	0.03	25.00	LCDB · MPC
182.	2010 KO_{10}	464	0.129	–	n.a.	NEO	S	0.01	27.10	LCDB · MPC
183.	2008 SA	467	0.1297	0.13	2	NEO	S	0.03	25.00	LCDB · MPC
184.	2013 SR	470	0.1305	1.00	2+	NEO	S	0.05	24.10	LCDB · MPC
185.	2015 KW_{120}	488	0.1355	0.24	2+	NEO	S	0.02	26.00	LCDB · MPC
186.	2016 PA_{40}	495	0.1375	0.93	3−	NEO	S	0.04	24.40	LCDB · MPC
187.	2000 WG_{63}	498	0.1383	0.43	3−	NEO	S	0.07	23.20	LCDB · MPC
188.	2014 WR_{6}	510	0.1417	0.67	3	NEO	S	0.03	25.30	LCDB · MPC
189.	2006 CL_{9}	527	0.1463	0.39	2+	NEO	S	0.08	22.80	LCDB · MPC
190.	2010 AL30	528	0.14660	0.23	3	NEO	S	0.01	27.20	LCDB · MPC
191.	(433303) 2013 NX	550	0.1529	0.89	3−	NEO	S	0.11	22.10	LCDB · List
192.	2008 WD_{14}	551	0.153051	0.68	3	NEO	S	0.06	23.16	LCDB · MPC
193.	2007 VV_{83}	554	0.15392	0.75	2+	NEO	S	0.03	24.70	LCDB · MPC
194.	2013 UG_{1}	560	0.155580	0.70	3	NEO	S	0.09	22.50	LCDB · MPC
195.	2009 TO_{8}	562	0.156	–	n.a.	NEO	S	0.02	26.10	LCDB · MPC
196.	2010 VZ_{11}	562	0.156	–	n.a.	NEO	S	0.02	25.60	LCDB · MPC
197.	2017 QK	576	0.1599	0.20	2	NEO	S	0.05	23.80	LCDB · MPC
198.	2000 WL_{107}	579	0.1609	1.10	3	NEO	S	0.04	24.44	LCDB · MPC
199.	2018 RC	596	0.16548	0.57	3	NEO	S	0.03	24.90	LCDB · MPC
200.	2000 WQ_{148}	597	0.1659	0.30	3	NEO	S	0.09	22.70	LCDB · MPC
201.	2011 WJ_{15}	600	0.1667	–	n.a.	NEO	S	0.03	25.20	LCDB · MPC
202.	2015 CD_{1}	601	0.167	0.28	2−	NEO	S	0.01	28.20	LCDB · MPC
203.	2001 AV43	612	0.1701	0.26	2	NEO	S	0.03	24.90	LCDB · MPC
204.	1998 KY26	642	0.1784	0.30	3	NEO	X	0.03	25.50	LCDB · MPC
205.	2017 BS_{32}	644	0.179	0.20	2	NEO	S	0.01	27.20	LCDB · MPC
206.	2015 BG_{92}	644	0.1790	0.36	3−	NEO	S	0.03	25.10	LCDB · MPC
207.	2014 YT_{34}	650	0.1806	0.45	3−	NEO	S	0.03	24.70	LCDB · MPC
208.	2015 XC	652	0.181099	0.55	3−	NEO	S	0.03	25.20	LCDB · MPC
209.	2015 CF	663	0.1841	0.05	1	NEO	S	0.06	23.50	LCDB · MPC
210.	2010 WC9	665	0.18469	0.95	3−	NEO	S	0.06	23.60	LCDB · MPC
211.	2015 FP	674	0.1872	0.53	2+	NEO	S	0.03	25.20	LCDB · MPC
212.	2015 LJ	675	0.1875	0.45	2	NEO	S	0.03	24.70	LCDB · MPC
213.	2009 HG_{60}	678	0.18835	0.40	3	NEO	S	0.09	22.70	LCDB · MPC
214.	2010 VB_{1}	681	0.18919	0.99	3	NEO	S	0.07	23.20	LCDB · MPC
215.	2015 JF	683	0.1897	0.33	2+	NEO	S	0.02	26.30	LCDB · MPC
216.	2008 TY_{9}	693	0.1924	0.35	3−	NEO	S	0.03	24.90	LCDB · MPC
217.	2011 MD	697	0.1937	1.00	2	NEO	S	0.01	28.00	LCDB · MPC
218.	2009 FX_{4}	720	0.2	–	n.a.	NEO	S	0.03	25.40	LCDB · MPC
219.	2008 XC_{1}	724	0.201	–	2	NEO	S	0.05	23.70	LCDB · MPC
220.	54509 YORP	730	0.2029	0.89	3	NEO	S	0.09	22.70	LCDB · List
221.	2012 TC4	735	0.204155	0.93	3	NEO	S	0.01	26.70	LCDB · MPC
222.	2015 OM_{21}	735	0.2042	0.55	2	NEO	S	0.09	22.50	LCDB · MPC
223.	2015 SU_{16}	739	0.2052	0.24	2	NEO	S	0.03	25.00	LCDB · MPC
224.	2009 WY_{7}	756	0.21	–	n.a.	NEO	S	0.05	24.10	LCDB · MPC
225.	2018 AM_{12}	758	0.2106	1.20	3−	NEO	S	0.17	21.20	LCDB · MPC
226.	2015 WF_{13}	763	0.21194	0.23	2+	NEO	S	0.07	23.20	LCDB · MPC
227.	2007 DX	765	0.212400	0.90	3	NEO	S	0.09	22.70	LCDB · MPC
228.	2015 HU_{9}	767	0.2130	0.15	1	NEO	S	0.06	23.40	LCDB · MPC
229.	2000 HB_{24}	783	0.2176	0.24	3	NEO	S	0.05	23.95	LCDB · MPC
230.	2008 DG_{4}	784	0.2179	0.25	2+	NEO	S	0.05	23.80	LCDB · MPC
231.	2016 RH_{18}	792	0.22	0.85	1+	NEO	S	0.14	21.60	LCDB · MPC
232.	2015 QT_{3}	814	0.2261	0.43	2+	NEO	S	0.05	24.00	LCDB · MPC
233.	2000 WG_{10}	821	0.228	0.48	3−	NEO	S	0.04	24.40	LCDB · MPC
234.	2014 UR	828	0.2300	0.13	2	NEO	S	0.01	26.60	LCDB · MPC
235.	2007 RQ_{12}	828	0.23	1.90	1	NEO	S	0.06	23.60	LCDB · MPC
236.	2013 SU_{24}	840	0.23335	1.60	3	NEO	S	0.04	24.50	LCDB · MPC
237.	2004 GD_{2}	847	0.23538	0.88	3−	NEO	S	0.04	24.30	LCDB · MPC
238.	2009 BK_{58}	864	0.24	–	n.a.	NEO	S	0.02	25.80	LCDB · MPC
239.	2005 UW_{5}	866	0.2406	0.24	2	NEO	S	0.01	27.50	LCDB · MPC
240.	2015 CS	876	0.2433	0.79	3	NEO	S	0.02	26.40	LCDB · MPC
241.	2004 KF_{17}	896	0.249	0.34	2+	NEO	S	0.02	26.10	LCDB · MPC
242.	2007 XO_{3}	911	0.2530	0.55	3−	NEO	S	0.08	22.90	LCDB · MPC
243.	2001 UF_{5}	940	0.261	0.60	3	NEO	S	0.10	22.40	LCDB · MPC
244.	2016 BF_{1}	945	0.2624	2.49	2+	NEO	S	0.03	25.40	LCDB · MPC
245.	2014 DH_{10}	958	0.2662	0.74	3	NEO	S	0.02	25.80	LCDB · MPC
246.	2007 TU_{18}	976	0.271	0.45	2+	NEO	S	0.03	25.00	LCDB · MPC
247.	2007 HD_{84}	991	0.2754	0.65	2	NEO	S	0.06	23.50	LCDB · MPC
248.	2014 GN_{1}	993	0.2758	0.90	2+	NEO	S	0.08	24.10	LCDB · MPC
249.	2016 GW_{221}	1028	0.2856	0.18	2	NEO	S	0.03	24.80	LCDB · MPC
250.	2013 YG	1052	0.2921	–	1	NEO	S	0.03	25.40	LCDB · MPC
251.	2012 EG5	1053	0.29240	0.40	3	NEO	S	0.04	24.30	LCDB · MPC
252.	2017 GK_{4}	1084	0.301	1.12	2	NEO	S	0.14	21.70	LCDB · MPC
253.	2018 GE3	1094	0.304	0.93	3−	NEO	S	0.05	23.80	LCDB · MPC
254.	2015 HV_{11}	1117	0.3102	0.20	2−	NEO	S	0.05	24.10	LCDB · MPC
255.	2006 SF_{77}	1123	0.312	0.38	3−	NEO	S	0.14	21.60	LCDB · MPC
256.	1998 WB_{2}	1127	0.313	0.60	3	NEO	S	0.11	22.10	LCDB · MPC
257.	(620070) 2011 UA	1139	0.316391	0.13	3−	NEO	S	0.57	18.60	LCDB · List
258.	2010 FC_{81}	1175	0.3263	0.43	3−	NEO	S	0.13	21.80	LCDB · MPC
259.	2008 CP_{116}	1188	0.330	0.15	1	NEO	S	0.08	22.90	LCDB · MPC
260.	2016 FL_{12}	1200	0.3333	0.15	2	NEO	S	0.02	26.30	LCDB · MPC
261.	2006 SA_{147}	1243	0.34529	0.28	1	Flora	S	0.47	18.80	LCDB · MPC
262.	2017 FH_{101}	1248	0.3468	0.58	3	NEO	S	0.09	22.50	LCDB · MPC
263.	2016 ES_{1}	1254	0.3484	0.26	2+	NEO	S	0.04	24.20	LCDB · MPC
264.	2014 OV_{3}	1257	0.3491	0.53	2+	NEO	S	0.07	23.20	LCDB · MPC
265.	2013 WA_{44}	1260	0.35	0.23	2+	NEO	S	0.05	23.70	LCDB · MPC
266.	2001 WR_{5}	1289	0.358	0.63	3	NEO	S	0.08	22.90	LCDB · MPC
267.	2017 YN_{3}	1300	0.361	0.21	1	NEO	S	0.43	19.20	LCDB · MPC
268.	2014 SC324	1302	0.36156	0.69	3	NEO	S	0.04	24.30	LCDB · MPC
269.	2008 WY_{94}	1312	0.364536	1.80	3	NEO	S	0.02	25.60	LCDB · MPC
270.	2008 VU_{3}	1334	0.37056	0.10	1+	NEO	S	0.06	23.40	LCDB · MPC
271.	2015 HM10	1354	0.3761	1.50	3	NEO	S	0.06	23.60	LCDB · MPC
272.	2009 FJ	1417	0.3937	–	n.a.	NEO	S	0.03	24.90	LCDB · MPC
273.	2001 BF_{10}	1440	0.4	–	2	NEO	S	0.09	22.60	LCDB · MPC
274.	2006 YH_{14}	1530	0.4251	1.10	2	NEO	S	0.07	23.20	LCDB · MPC
275.	(671076) 2014 FP_{47}	1584	0.44	0.17	3−	NEO	S	0.10	22.30	LCDB · List
276.	2006 HU_{50}	1598	0.444	0.50	3	NEO	S	0.03	24.70	LCDB · MPC
277.	2010 JO_{71}	1642	0.4561	0.40	2−	NEO	S	0.04	23.90	LCDB · MPC
278.	2001 XU_{4}	1656	0.46	0.76	2	NEO	S	0.05	23.70	LCDB · MPC
279.	469219 Kamoʻoalewa	1681	0.467	0.80	2	NEO	S	0.04	24.30	LCDB · List
280.	2016 YM_{1}	1692	0.47	1.07	1+	NEO	S	0.11	22.10	LCDB · MPC
281.	2018 LQ_{2}	1699	0.47185	0.42	3	NEO	S	0.03	24.90	LCDB · MPC
282.	2014 WF_{201}	1707	0.4743	0.56	2	NEO	S	0.02	25.60	LCDB · MPC
283.	(488515) 2001 FE_{90}	1720	0.4777	2.13	3	NEO	S	0.23	20.60	LCDB · List
284.	(44576) 1999 GJ_{10}	1728	0.48	0.25	n.a.	MBA (outer)	C	5.83	14.90	LCDB · List
285.	2015 RQ_{36}	1732	0.4812	0.23	2	NEO	S	0.04	24.50	LCDB · MPC
286.	(455213) 2001 OE_{84}	1751	0.4865	0.60	3	NEO	S	0.65	18.31	LCDB · List
287.	2014 JR_{25}	1753	0.487	0.26	1	NEO	S	0.07	23.30	LCDB · MPC

back to top

== Periods 0.5–1 hour ==
#	Minor planet designation	Rotation period		Δmag	Quality (U)	Orbit or family	Spectral type	Diameter (km)	Abs. mag (H)	Refs
#	Minor planet designation	(seconds)	(hours)	Δmag	Quality (U)	Orbit or family	Spectral type	Diameter (km)	Abs. mag (H)	Refs
288.	2014 WA_{366}	1800	0.5	0.50	2	NEO	S	0.01	26.90	LCDB · MPC
289.	2015 GC_{14}	1800	0.5	0.30	2−	NEO	S	0.03	24.80	LCDB · MPC
290.	(578993) 2014 JP_{80}	1800	0.5	0.10	n.a.	TNO	C	401.35	5.10	LCDB · List
291.	2015 HB_{177}	1822	0.506	1.10	2	NEO	S	0.04	24.60	LCDB · MPC
292.	2005 GB_{34}	1872	0.520	0.38	2+	NEO	S	0.03	25.40	LCDB · MPC
293.	2016 UL_{98}	1872	0.52	0.45	2	MBA (inner)	S	0.49	18.90	LCDB · MPC
294.	(301150) 2008 YB_{7}	1872	0.52	–	n.a.	MBA (inner)	S	1.24	16.90	LCDB · List
295.	2014 RQ_{17}	1878	0.5216	0.99	3	NEO	S	0.10	22.30	LCDB · MPC
296.	2007 UC_{2}	1897	0.527	0.40	2−	NEO	S	0.08	23.00	LCDB · MPC
297.	2001 DS_{8}	1912	0.531	0.46	3−	NEO	S	0.08	22.80	LCDB · MPC
298.	2002 AA29	1980	0.55	–	2	NEO	S	0.03	25.20	LCDB · MPC
299.	2000 WN_{148}	1980	0.55	0.14	2	NEO	S	0.10	22.40	LCDB · MPC
300.	(515769) 2015 KK_{10}	1980	0.55	0.18	n.a.	Eunomia	S	1.21	16.90	LCDB · List
301.	2014 UV_{210}	2001	0.5559	0.91	3−	NEO	S	0.01	26.90	LCDB · MPC
302.	(61898) 2000 QZ_{227}	2052	0.57	0.28	n.a.	Vestian	S	2.36	15.50	LCDB · List
303.	2015 BF_{511}	2074	0.5760	0.52	3	NEO	S	0.03	24.80	LCDB · MPC
304.	2000 UO_{30}	2081	0.578	0.21	3−	NEO	S	0.04	24.30	LCDB · MPC
305.	2015 SO2	2088	0.58	1.65	3−	NEO	S	0.05	23.90	LCDB · MPC
306.	(359760) 2011 UW_{102}	2088	0.58	0.04	n.a.	MBA (outer)	C	3.85	15.80	LCDB · List
307.	2016 AU_{9}	2138	0.594	0.59	2+	NEO	S	0.03	25.40	LCDB · MPC
308.	2015 AZ43	2160	0.59992	0.58	3	NEO	S	0.06	23.50	LCDB · MPC
309.	(436724) 2011 UW158	2199	0.61073	2.05	3	NEO	S	0.31	19.90	LCDB · List
310.	2017 HU_{49}	2232	0.62	0.70	2	NEO	S	0.02	26.50	LCDB · MPC
311.	(256033) 2006 UJ_{47}	2311	0.64190	0.08	1	Vestian	S	1.18	17.00	LCDB · List
312.	2006 KC	2340	0.65	0.19	2	NEO	S	0.11	22.20	LCDB · MPC
313.	Derm6b	2376	0.66	0.09	1	MBA (inner)	S	0.72	18.04	LCDB · —
314.	2000 YA	2397	0.6658	0.35	2	NEO	S	0.05	23.70	LCDB · MPC
315.	(229441) 2005 UJ_{8}	2412	0.67	0.14	n.a.	MBA (inner)	S	1.30	16.80	LCDB · List
316.	2018 AJ	2420	0.6722	1.09	3	NEO	S	0.04	24.50	LCDB · MPC
317.	2006 KS_{38}	2448	0.68	0.55	3	NEO	S	0.05	23.90	LCDB · MPC
318.	(361653) 2007 TX_{330}	2448	0.68	0.33	n.a.	MBA (middle)	SC	1.27	17.60	LCDB · List
319.	(154709) 2004 KR	2448	0.68	0.14	n.a.	Flora	S	1.49	16.30	LCDB · List
320.	(480983) 2003 YL_{26}	2448	0.68	0.12	n.a.	MBA (middle)	SC	1.92	16.70	LCDB · List
321.	(481056) 2005 LH_{31}	2448	0.68	0.24	n.a.	MBA (middle)	SC	2.01	16.60	LCDB · List
322.	(267094) 1999 XJ_{131}	2448	0.68	0.14	n.a.	MBA (outer)	C	5.08	15.20	LCDB · List
323.	2015 LQ_{21}	2484	0.69	0.24	2	NEO	S	0.04	24.50	LCDB · MPC
324.	2006 HH_{56}	2520	0.7	0.10	1	NEO	S	0.05	24.00	LCDB · MPC
325.	(337275) 2000 UD_{77}	2520	0.7	0.18	n.a.	MBA (inner)	S	1.24	16.90	LCDB · List
326.	2017 EA_{3}	2556	0.71	0.05	1+	NEO	S	0.07	23.20	LCDB · MPC
327.	2013 PJ10	2606	0.724	0.74	3	NEO	S	0.04	24.60	LCDB · MPC
328.	Derm4o	2628	0.73	0.20	1	MBA (inner)	S	0.17	21.13	LCDB · —
329.	2011 XA_{3}	2628	0.730	0.68	3−	NEO	S	0.25	20.40	LCDB · MPC
330.	2007 KE	2632	0.731	0.80	2+	NEO	S	0.09	22.50	LCDB · MPC
331.	2002 GD_{10}	2648	0.7356	0.09	2	NEO	S	0.09	22.70	LCDB · MPC
332.	2004 TC_{18}	2668	0.741	0.34	2	NEO	S	0.05	24.00	LCDB · MPC
333.	(114155) 2002 VH_{67}	2700	0.75	0.22	n.a.	Flora	S	1.36	16.50	LCDB · List
334.	2016 HO	2704	0.7512	0.43	2	NEO	S	0.02	25.70	LCDB · MPC
335.	2017 QT_{1}	2772	0.77	0.78	2	NEO	S	0.01	26.70	LCDB · MPC
336.	(565023) 2017 BG_{12}	2772	0.77	0.18	n.a.	MBA (inner)	S	1.36	16.70	LCDB · List
337.	(457154) 2008 FW_{136}	2772	0.77	0.29	n.a.	MBA (outer)	C	3.20	16.20	LCDB · List
338.	(429649) 2011 GU_{3}	2790	0.775	–	n.a.	MBA (outer)	C	2.32	16.90	LCDB · List
339.	(124619) 2001 SC_{49}	2808	0.78	0.22	n.a.	MBA (inner)	S	2.15	15.70	LCDB · List
340.	(139987) 2001 SJ_{32}	2808	0.78	0.16	n.a.	MBA (outer)	C	4.03	15.70	LCDB · List
341.	2015 MX_{103}	2831	0.7865	0.20	2	NEO	S	0.04	24.40	LCDB · MPC
342.	Derm4c	2844	0.79	0.20	1	MBA (inner)	S	0.10	22.31	LCDB · —
343.	2013 TL	2859	0.7942	0.56	2+	NEO	S	0.11	22.20	LCDB · MPC
344.	2014 JT_{80}	2880	0.8	0.10	n.a.	TNO	C	139.16	7.40	LCDB · MPC
345.	2015 BM_{510}	2902	0.806	0.39	2	NEO	S	0.03	25.10	LCDB · MPC
346.	2009 UO_{3}	2934	0.8150833	0.80	3−	NEO	S	0.08	23.00	LCDB · MPC
347.	(436136) 2009 UC_{26}	2952	0.82	0.21	n.a.	Flora	S	0.75	17.80	LCDB · List
348.	(347394) 2012 SK_{1}	2952	0.82	0.38	n.a.	Nysa	S	0.96	17.40	LCDB · List
349.	(349142) 2007 KO_{9}	2952	0.82	0.48	n.a.	MBA (inner)	S	1.42	16.60	LCDB · List
350.	(127835) 2003 FX_{104}	2952	0.82	0.22	n.a.	Nysa	S	1.52	16.40	LCDB · List
351.	(295196) 2008 FQ_{107}	2952	0.82	0.25	n.a.	MBA (outer)	C	5.08	15.20	LCDB · List
352.	2008 CP	2997	0.83253	0.50	3	NEO	S	0.05	24.10	LCDB · MPC
353.	(479325) 2013 TV_{5}	3012	0.8367	0.42	3	NEO	S	0.41	19.30	LCDB · List
354.	(747728) 2013 AH_{24}	3060	0.85	0.51	n.a.	MBA (inner)	S	0.90	17.60	LCDB · List
355.	(398723) 2012 XT_{114}	3060	0.85	0.27	n.a.	MBA (middle)	SC	1.75	16.90	LCDB · List
356.	(82364) 2001 MW_{7}	3060	0.85	0.34	n.a.	MBA (inner)	S	2.25	15.60	LCDB · List
357.	(164177) 2004 BM_{46}	3060	0.85	0.29	n.a.	MBA (outer)	C	4.22	15.60	LCDB · List
358.	2001 KU_{66}	3132	0.87	0.55	3−	NEO	S	0.05	24.10	LCDB · MPC
359.	(477114) 2009 BR_{183}	3132	0.87	0.17	n.a.	MBA (middle)	SC	2.21	16.40	LCDB · List
360.	(353075) 2009 DO_{94}	3168	0.88	0.30	n.a.	MBA (outer)	C	2.92	16.40	LCDB · List
361.	(250545) 2004 RY_{59}	3168	0.88	0.20	n.a.	MBA (outer)	C	4.42	15.50	LCDB · List
362.	(129419) 2619 T-3	3168	0.88	0.13	n.a.	MBA (outer)	C	7.34	14.40	LCDB · List
363.	2010 NR_{1}	3204	0.89	1.80	2−	NEO	S	0.13	21.80	LCDB · MPC
364.	Derm4m	3204	0.89	0.04	1	MBA (outer)	C	1.17	18.36	LCDB · —
365.	2016 YM	3240	0.9	0.14	n.a.	NEO	S	0.11	22.10	LCDB · MPC
366.	2010 BT_{3}	3240	0.9	0.20	1	NEO	S	0.16	21.40	LCDB · MPC
367.	2016 UJ_{101}	3240	0.9	0.18	n.a.	NEO	S	0.25	20.40	LCDB · MPC
368.	(85641) 1998 OR_{5}	3240	0.9	0.37	n.a.	MBA (inner)	S	2.15	15.70	LCDB · List
369.	(249249) 2008 RA_{106}	3240	0.9	0.90	2−	Eunomia	S	2.30	15.50	LCDB · List
370.	(139494) 2001 PE_{31}	3240	0.9	0.51	n.a.	MBA (middle)	SC	2.53	16.10	LCDB · List
371.	(164726) 1998 QE107	3240	0.9	0.23	n.a.	MBA (middle)	SC	3.50	15.40	LCDB · List
372.	(217740) 2000 BQ_{30}	3240	0.9	0.32	n.a.	MBA (outer)	C	5.83	14.90	LCDB · List
373.	2001 WJ_{4}	3254	0.904	0.93	3	NEO	S	0.01	27.40	LCDB · MPC
374.	(363305) 2002 NV_{16}	3264	0.9067	0.20	2	NEO	S	0.16	21.40	LCDB · List
375.	(402581) 2006 RX_{91}	3271	0.9086	0.20	1	MBA (middle)	S	1.53	17.20	LCDB · List
376.	(533011) 2014 AY_{28}	3290	0.9139	0.54	3	NEO	S	0.13	21.80	LCDB · List
377.	2014 JJ_{55}	3294	0.915	1.06	3−	NEO	S	0.03	25.30	LCDB · MPC
378.	(788328) 2016 UN_{129}	3312	0.92	0.55	2	MBA (inner)	S	0.82	17.80	LCDB · List
379.	(145971) 2000 AG_{38}	3312	0.92	0.30	n.a.	Flora	S	1.49	16.30	LCDB · List
380.	(149649) 2004 FR_{43}	3312	0.92	0.49	n.a.	Flora	S	1.49	16.30	LCDB · List
381.	(197746) 2004 PN_{30}	3312	0.92	0.14	n.a.	Vestian	S	1.49	16.50	LCDB · List
382.	(119104) 2001 ON_{53}	3312	0.92	0.18	n.a.	Vestian	S	1.63	16.30	LCDB · List
383.	(202244) 2005 AW_{13}	3312	0.92	0.18	n.a.	MBA (inner)	S	1.71	16.20	LCDB · List
384.	(55160) 2001 QT_{236}	3312	0.92	0.35	n.a.	MBA (inner)	S	1.79	16.10	LCDB · List
385.	(294007) 2007 TL_{95}	3312	0.92	0.34	n.a.	Eunomia	S	2.30	15.50	LCDB · List
386.	(52487) 1995 XO2	3312	0.92	0.34	n.a.	MBA (inner)	S	2.47	15.40	LCDB · List
387.	(121344) 1999 TB_{29}	3312	0.92	0.70	n.a.	MBA (inner)	S	2.47	15.40	LCDB · List
388.	(187203) 2005 SB_{85}	3312	0.92	0.66	n.a.	MBA (outer)	C	3.51	16.00	LCDB · List
389.	(12523) 1998 HH_{100}	3312	0.92	0.14	n.a.	MBA (inner)	S	6.81	13.20	LCDB · List
390.	(306383) 1993 VD	3396	0.94345	0.80	3	NEO	S	0.15	21.50	LCDB · List
391.	2014 WC_{201}	3420	0.95	0.38	2	NEO	S	0.02	26.20	LCDB · MPC
392.	Derm4a	3420	0.95	0.15	2−	MBA (inner)	S	0.22	20.58	LCDB · —
393.	(196373) 2003 FO_{127}	3420	0.95	0.24	n.a.	MBA (inner)	S	1.71	16.20	LCDB · List
394.	(264449) 2000 UB_{17}	3492	0.97	0.36	n.a.	Flora	S	0.90	17.40	LCDB · List
395.	(74649) 1999 RF_{73}	3492	0.97	0.16	n.a.	Flora	S	1.42	16.40	LCDB · List
396.	(84450) 2002 TZ_{241}	3492	0.97	0.33	n.a.	Flora	S	1.49	16.30	LCDB · List
397.	(159569) 2001 UD_{163}	3492	0.97	0.63	n.a.	Vestian	S	1.71	16.20	LCDB · List
398.	(150382) 2000 DK_{48}	3492	0.97	0.34	n.a.	Baptistina	C	2.32	16.90	LCDB · List
399.	(350007) 2010 GG_{156}	3492	0.97	0.68	n.a.	MBA (middle)	SC	2.42	16.20	LCDB · List
400.	(182517) 2001 SC_{294}	3492	0.97	0.85	n.a.	MBA (outer)	C	2.92	16.40	LCDB · List
401.	(78701) 2002 TO_{175}	3528	0.98	0.09	n.a.	Eunomia	S	3.33	14.70	LCDB · List
402.	(475443) 2006 RG_{24}	3564	0.99	0.39	2+	Flora	S	0.54	18.50	LCDB · List

back to top

== Periods 1–2 hours ==
#	Minor planet designation	Rotation period		Δmag	Quality (U)	Orbit or family	Spectral type	Diameter (km)	Abs. mag (H)	Refs
#	Minor planet designation	(seconds)	(hours)	Δmag	Quality (U)	Orbit or family	Spectral type	Diameter (km)	Abs. mag (H)	Refs
403.	2009 FK	3600	1.	–	n.a.	NEO	S	0.01	28.30	LCDB · MPC
404.	2015 DS	3600	1.0	0.54	2	NEO	S	0.03	24.90	LCDB · MPC
405.	2016 GF_{216}	3600	1	0.20	2−	NEO	S	0.03	24.90	LCDB · MPC
406.	2016 JD_{18}	3600	1	1.30	2	NEO	S	0.04	24.60	LCDB · MPC
407.	2007 TS_{24}	3600	1.0	1.30	2−	NEO	S	0.07	23.30	LCDB · MPC
408.	2007 RE_{2}	3600	1.0	0.50	2	NEO	S	0.08	22.80	LCDB · MPC
409.	2017 AE_{3}	3600	1.0	1.13	n.a.	NEO	S	0.13	21.80	LCDB · MPC
410.	2000 LF_{3}	3600	1.0	–	2	NEO	S	0.14	21.60	LCDB · MPC
411.	2017 CO_{5}	3600	1.0	0.31	1+	NEO	S	0.28	20.10	LCDB · MPC
412.	2016 WO_{1}	3600	1.0	0.40	n.a.	NEO	S	0.30	20.00	LCDB · MPC
413.	2017 BG_{85}	3600	1.0	0.43	1+	NEO	S	0.49	18.90	LCDB · MPC
414.	2009 UJ_{34}	3600	1.0	0.16	n.a.	MBA (inner)	S	0.52	18.80	LCDB · MPC
415.	(281784) 2009 SH_{352}	3600	1.0	0.14	n.a.	Flora	S	0.71	17.90	LCDB · List
416.	(383393) 2006 TE_{30}	3600	1.0	0.19	n.a.	Flora	S	0.71	17.90	LCDB · List
417.	(477230) 2009 RW_{6}	3600	1.0	0.61	n.a.	Mars crosser	S	0.78	17.90	LCDB · List
418.	(644295) 2006 UG_{215}	3600	1.0	0.06	n.a.	MBA (inner)	S	0.82	17.80	LCDB · List
419.	(222974) 2002 QQ_{116}	3600	1.0	0.16	n.a.	Flora	S	0.82	17.60	LCDB · List
420.	(120369) 2005 NW_{94}	3600	1.0	0.16	n.a.	Flora	S	0.86	17.50	LCDB · List
421.	(226163) 2002 TG_{20}	3600	1.0	0.10	n.a.	Flora	S	0.86	17.50	LCDB · List
422.	(222931) 2002 NQ_{7}	3600	1.0	0.44	n.a.	Mars crosser	S	0.94	17.50	LCDB · List
423.	(340077) 2005 WP_{7}	3600	1.0	0.54	n.a.	MBA (inner)	S	0.94	17.50	LCDB · List
424.	(220035) 2002 RM_{6}	3600	1.0	0.09	n.a.	MBA (inner)	S	0.98	17.40	LCDB · List
425.	(635056) 2012 VR_{96}	3600	1.0	0.16	n.a.	MBA (inner)	S	1.08	17.20	LCDB · List
426.	(276001) 2001 XJ_{228}	3600	1.0	0.11	n.a.	Nysa	S	1.10	17.10	LCDB · List
427.	(100493) 1996 VK_{37}	3600	1.0	0.22	n.a.	Mars crosser	S	1.13	17.10	LCDB · List
428.	(340212) 2006 AW_{69}	3600	1.0	0.14	n.a.	Nysa	S	1.16	17.00	LCDB · List
429.	(145931) 1999 XO_{5}	3600	1.0	0.08	n.a.	Flora	S	1.24	16.70	LCDB · List
430.	(198513) 2004 XK_{87}	3600	1.0	0.11	n.a.	MBA (inner)	S	1.24	16.90	LCDB · List
431.	(228845) 2003 EQ_{54}	3600	1.0	0.15	n.a.	MBA (inner)	S	1.24	16.90	LCDB · List
432.	(318388) 2004 XE_{30}	3600	1.0	0.09	n.a.	MBA (inner)	S	1.24	16.90	LCDB · List
433.	(481606) 2007 TA_{406}	3600	1.0	0.22	n.a.	Eunomia	S	1.45	16.50	LCDB · List
434.	(75152) 1999 VP_{105}	3600	1.0	0.27	n.a.	Flora	S	1.49	16.30	LCDB · List
435.	(126672) 2002 CL_{215}	3600	1.0	0.17	n.a.	MBA (inner)	S	1.56	16.40	LCDB · List
436.	(366279) 2013 AD_{91}	3600	1.0	0.15	n.a.	MBA (middle)	SC	1.83	16.80	LCDB · List
437.	(89238) 2001 UQ_{153}	3600	1.0	0.05	n.a.	Vestian	S	1.88	16.00	LCDB · List
438.	(29295) 1993 OC_{13}	3600	1.0	0.09	n.a.	MBA (inner)	S	1.96	15.90	LCDB · List
439.	(44619) 1999 RO_{42}	3600	1.0	0.27	n.a.	Mars crosser	S	1.96	15.90	LCDB · List
440.	22794 Lindsayleona	3600	1.0	0.11	n.a.	Flora	S	1.97	15.70	LCDB · List
441.	(44669) 1999 RC_{182}	3600	1.0	0.49	n.a.	Flora	S	1.97	15.70	LCDB · List
442.	(80173) 1999 UQ_{12}	3600	1.0	0.06	n.a.	Flora	S	2.06	15.60	LCDB · List
443.	(140696) 2001 UV_{72}	3600	1.0	0.43	n.a.	Koronis	S	2.06	15.60	LCDB · List
444.	(57679) 2001 UD_{46}	3600	1.0	0.08	n.a.	Vestian	S	2.15	15.70	LCDB · List
445.	(167399) 2003 WX_{101}	3600	1.0	0.08	n.a.	MBA (middle)	SC	2.65	16.00	LCDB · List
446.	(469800) 2005 SZ_{23}	3600	1.0	0.23	n.a.	MBA (outer)	C	3.20	16.20	LCDB · List
447.	(29551) 1998 CH1	3600	1.0	0.08	n.a.	Koronis	S	3.26	14.60	LCDB · List
448.	(51075) 2000 GG_{162}	3600	1.0	0.60	n.a.	Mars crosser	S	3.35	14.80	LCDB · List
449.	(357901) 2005 VT_{40}	3600	1.0	0.19	n.a.	MBA (outer)	C	3.51	16.00	LCDB · List
450.	(41037) 1999 US_{51}	3600	1.0	0.19	n.a.	MBA (middle)	SC	3.66	15.30	LCDB · List
451.	(207289) 2005 GY_{22}	3600	1.0	0.17	n.a.	MBA (outer)	C	4.42	15.50	LCDB · List
452.	(358426) 2007 DC_{8}	3600	1.0	0.14	n.a.	MBA (outer)	C	4.85	15.30	LCDB · List
453.	(556067) 2014 JK_{80}	3600	1.	0.17	n.a.	TNO	C	220.56	6.40	LCDB · List
454.	(326242) 2012 DS_{21}	3744	1.04	0.35	1+	MBA (inner)	S	0.92	17.55	LCDB · List
455.	(372963) 2011 BY_{111}	3852	1.07	0.40	1	MBA (middle)	SC	0.94	18.26	LCDB · List
456.	(335309) 2005 QM_{37}	3852	1.07	0.11	n.a.	Erigone	C	2.32	16.90	LCDB · List
457.	(396026) 2013 CG_{7}	3852	1.07	0.15	n.a.	MBA (outer)	C	3.06	16.30	LCDB · List
458.	2002 TZ_{66}	3960	1.1	–	2	NEO	S	0.02	25.90	LCDB · MPC
459.	2016 WP	3960	1.1	0.89	n.a.	NEO	S	0.12	21.90	LCDB · MPC
460.	(844507) 2017 BL_{6}	3960	1.1	0.83	2−	NEO	S	0.17	21.20	LCDB · List
461.	2017 CJ_{1}	3960	1.1	0.65	n.a.	NEO	S	0.45	19.10	LCDB · MPC
462.	(225708) 2001 QH_{246}	3960	1.1	0.26	n.a.	MBA (inner)	S	1.36	16.70	LCDB · List
463.	(835418) 2011 LD_{20}	3960	1.1	0.20	n.a.	Mars crosser	S	1.63	16.30	LCDB · List
464.	(85338) 1995 SX_{37}	3960	1.1	0.15	n.a.	MBA (inner)	S	2.06	15.80	LCDB · List
465.	(139858) 2001 RW_{61}	3960	1.1	0.37	n.a.	Koronis	S	2.06	15.60	LCDB · List
466.	(212650) 2006 UF_{91}	3960	1.1	0.63	n.a.	MBA (outer)	C	4.22	15.60	LCDB · List
467.	(434552) 2005 TU_{98}	4068	1.13	0.29	n.a.	MBA (inner)	S	1.18	17.00	LCDB · List
468.	(159593) 2001 XR_{167}	4068	1.13	0.46	n.a.	MBA (inner)	S	1.36	16.70	LCDB · List
469.	(80679) 2000 BR_{28}	4068	1.13	0.29	n.a.	Flora	S	1.71	16.00	LCDB · List
470.	(130953) 2000 WT_{79}	4068	1.13	0.17	n.a.	MBA (inner)	S	1.71	16.20	LCDB · List
471.	(80227) 1999 VH_{168}	4068	1.13	0.24	n.a.	Baptistina	C	3.51	16.00	LCDB · List
472.	(97157) 1999 VP_{165}	4068	1.13	0.24	n.a.	MBA (middle)	SC	3.83	15.20	LCDB · List
473.	(335350) 2005 SZ_{53}	4140	1.15	0.47	n.a.	MBA (inner)	S	0.90	17.60	LCDB · List
474.	(478664) 2012 TV_{257}	4140	1.15	0.25	n.a.	MBA (inner)	S	0.94	17.50	LCDB · List
475.	(478869) 2012 VA_{91}	4140	1.15	0.18	n.a.	MBA (inner)	S	0.94	17.50	LCDB · List
476.	(340100) 2005 WO_{105}	4140	1.15	0.10	n.a.	MBA (inner)	S	1.03	17.30	LCDB · List
477.	(273329) 2006 TS_{54}	4140	1.15	0.15	n.a.	Flora	S	1.18	16.80	LCDB · List
478.	(480963) 2003 UH_{90}	4140	1.15	0.26	n.a.	MBA (middle)	SC	1.46	17.30	LCDB · List
479.	(118308) 1998 VT_{7}	4140	1.15	0.35	n.a.	Flora	S	1.49	16.30	LCDB · List
480.	(344986) 2004 YT_{16}	4140	1.15	0.25	n.a.	MBA (inner)	S	1.49	16.50	LCDB · List
481.	(74862) 1999 TB_{91}	4140	1.15	0.05	n.a.	Flora	S	1.64	16.10	LCDB · List
482.	(122179) 2000 KT_{38}	4140	1.15	0.09	n.a.	Vestian	S	1.79	16.10	LCDB · List
483.	(155749) 2000 SR_{97}	4140	1.15	0.20	n.a.	Vestian	S	1.96	15.90	LCDB · List
484.	(48291) 2002 JQ_{1}	4140	1.15	0.09	n.a.	MBA (inner)	S	2.06	15.80	LCDB · List
485.	(634465) 2011 SP_{232}	4140	1.15	0.34	n.a.	MBA (outer)	C	2.79	16.50	LCDB · List
486.	(70425) 1999 SJ_{26}	4140	1.15	0.06	n.a.	MBA (inner)	S	3.11	14.90	LCDB · List
487.	(353504) 2011 SK_{90}	4140	1.15	0.37	n.a.	MBA (outer)	C	3.20	16.20	LCDB · List
488.	(503785) 2016 UW_{67}	4140	1.15	0.71	n.a.	MBA (outer)	C	3.20	16.20	LCDB · List
489.	(83470) 2001 SF_{76}	4140	1.15	0.13	n.a.	MBA (outer)	C	5.32	15.10	LCDB · List
490.	Derm2J	4176	1.16	0.09	1+	MBA (outer)	C	2.03	17.16	LCDB · —
491.	12205 Basharp	4176	1.16	0.14	1	MBA (inner)	S	2.84	15.10	LCDB · List
492.	2015 OV	4212	1.17	0.38	2	NEO	S	0.06	23.60	LCDB · MPC
493.	2016 UA_{23}	4248	1.18	0.15	n.a.	Flora	S	0.37	19.30	LCDB · MPC
494.	(225312) 1996 XB27	4302	1.195	0.52	2	NEO	S	0.14	21.70	LCDB · List
495.	2016 DN_{2}	4320	1.2	0.31	2−	NEO	S	0.01	26.90	LCDB · MPC
496.	2009 DD45	4320	1.2	–	n.a.	NEO	S	0.02	25.80	LCDB · MPC
497.	2016 JE_{18}	4320	1.2	0.65	2	NEO	S	0.02	26.30	LCDB · MPC
498.	2007 RY_{9}	4320	1.2	0.60	2−	NEO	S	0.06	23.40	LCDB · MPC
499.	7603 Salopia	4320	1.2	0.05	1	MBA (outer)	C	13.98	13.00	LCDB · List
500.	Derm2f	4356	1.21	0.10	1	MBA (inner)	S	0.42	19.24	LCDB · —
501.	2016 UR_{73}	4392	1.22	0.36	n.a.	MBA (middle)	SC	0.80	18.60	LCDB · MPC
502.	(346352) 2008 RM_{118}	4392	1.22	0.63	1+	MBA (inner)	S	0.81	17.83	LCDB · List
503.	(402995) 2007 VC_{199}	4392	1.22	0.19	n.a.	MBA (outer)	C	2.43	16.80	LCDB · List
504.	2018 EB	4395	1.2208	0.51	2+	NEO	S	0.13	21.80	LCDB · MPC
505.	(395043) 2009 DY_{105}	4428	1.23	0.34	3	Koronis	S	1.24	16.70	LCDB · List
506.	(523811) 2008 TQ_{2}	4457	1.238	0.20	1+	NEO	S	0.20	20.90	LCDB · List
507.	(49719) 1999 VE_{50}	4464	1.24	0.09	1+	Flora	S	2.47	15.20	LCDB · List
508.	(66562) 1999 RO_{136}	4500	1.25	0.15	n.a.	MBA (inner)	S	2.15	15.70	LCDB · List
509.	2009 SH_{2}	4536	1.26	–	n.a.	NEO	S	0.03	24.90	LCDB · MPC
510.	2019 HC	4540	1.2612	0.09	3	NEO	S	0.90	17.60	LCDB · MPC
511.	(437790) 2015 CP_{40}	4572	1.27	0.40	2−	MBA (outer)	C	3.00	16.34	LCDB · List
512.	2016 US_{92}	4608	1.28	0.13	n.a.	Flora	S	0.34	19.50	LCDB · MPC
513.	(523603) 2004 QJ_{7}	4608	1.28	0.27	1	NEO	S	0.57	18.60	LCDB · List
514.	2016 UG_{72}	4608	1.28	0.27	n.a.	MBA (middle)	SC	1.16	17.80	LCDB · MPC
515.	(488306) 2016 UH_{69}	4608	1.28	0.14	n.a.	MBA (middle)	SC	1.67	17.00	LCDB · List
516.	2015 EG	4644	1.29	0.29	2	NEO	S	0.02	25.70	LCDB · MPC
517.	(335433) 2005 UW_{163}	4644	1.29	0.70	3	MBA (inner)	S	0.90	17.60	LCDB · List
518.	(530520) 2011 LT_{17}	4648	1.291	0.16	2	NEO	S	0.14	21.60	LCDB · List
519.	(444497) 2006 RT_{41}	4671	1.2976	0.20	1	MBA (outer)	C	2.12	17.10	LCDB · List
520.	1999 TN_{13}	4680	1.3	–	2	NEO	S	0.06	23.60	LCDB · MPC
521.	2016 DK	4680	1.30	0.85	3	NEO	S	0.10	22.40	LCDB · MPC
522.	1998 BY_{7}	4680	1.3	–	2	NEO	S	0.15	21.50	LCDB · MPC
523.	Derm0b	4752	1.32	0.10	1	MBA (inner)	S	0.57	18.55	LCDB · —
524.	Derm1H	4752	1.32	0.05	1	MBA (inner)	S	0.74	17.98	LCDB · —
525.	Derm2K	4788	1.33	0.09	1	MBA (inner)	S	0.21	20.74	LCDB · —
526.	2016 UG_{83}	4788	1.33	0.18	n.a.	Flora	S	0.47	18.80	LCDB · MPC
527.	(754844) 2016 US_{77}	4788	1.33	0.17	n.a.	Flora	S	0.62	18.20	LCDB · List
528.	(434178) 2002 US_{27}	4788	1.33	0.22	n.a.	Flora	S	0.65	18.10	LCDB · List
529.	(327753) 2006 TX_{77}	4788	1.33	0.16	n.a.	Flora	S	0.71	17.90	LCDB · List
530.	(385684) 2005 SF_{252}	4788	1.33	0.14	n.a.	MBA (inner)	S	0.71	18.10	LCDB · List
531.	(383418) 2006 UZ_{226}	4788	1.33	0.14	n.a.	Flora	S	0.78	17.70	LCDB · List
532.	(478515) 2012 SR_{46}	4788	1.33	0.14	n.a.	MBA (inner)	S	0.78	17.90	LCDB · List
533.	(234588) 2001 YU_{25}	4788	1.33	0.13	n.a.	Nysa	S	0.88	17.60	LCDB · List
534.	(150438) 2000 GG_{117}	4788	1.33	0.30	n.a.	Flora	S	0.94	17.30	LCDB · List
535.	(334997) 2004 GA_{8}	4788	1.33	0.17	n.a.	Flora	S	1.03	17.10	LCDB · List
536.	(183201) 2002 TE_{17}	4788	1.33	0.09	n.a.	Flora	S	1.13	16.90	LCDB · List
537.	(267130) 2000 ED_{23}	4788	1.33	0.18	n.a.	MBA (inner)	S	1.13	17.10	LCDB · List
538.	(227247) 2005 SC_{50}	4788	1.33	0.20	n.a.	MBA (inner)	S	1.18	17.00	LCDB · List
539.	(393749) 2005 EL_{167}	4788	1.33	0.14	n.a.	MBA (middle)	SC	1.21	17.70	LCDB · List
540.	(512729) 2016 UF_{23}	4788	1.33	0.22	n.a.	Koronis	S	1.24	16.70	LCDB · List
541.	(342293) 2008 TZ_{35}	4788	1.33	0.17	n.a.	Vestian	S	1.30	16.80	LCDB · List
542.	(480959) 2003 UZ_{3}	4788	1.33	0.21	n.a.	MBA (middle)	SC	1.33	17.50	LCDB · List
543.	(98150) 2000 SO_{66}	4788	1.33	0.13	n.a.	Flora	S	1.36	16.50	LCDB · List
544.	(185962) 2001 FH_{75}	4788	1.33	0.10	n.a.	Flora	S	1.49	16.30	LCDB · List
545.	(230242) 2001 UD_{131}	4788	1.33	0.11	n.a.	Vestian	S	1.49	16.50	LCDB · List
546.	(92668) 2000 QB_{53}	4788	1.33	0.06	n.a.	Nysa	S	1.59	16.30	LCDB · List
547.	(73276) 2002 JU_{53}	4788	1.33	0.12	n.a.	Flora	S	1.64	16.10	LCDB · List
548.	(492348) 2014 HS_{12}	4788	1.33	0.23	n.a.	MBA (middle)	SC	1.83	16.80	LCDB · List
549.	2016 UM_{15}	4788	1.33	0.20	n.a.	MBA (outer)	C	2.02	17.20	LCDB · MPC
550.	(118599) 2000 GZ_{103}	4788	1.33	0.17	n.a.	MBA (inner)	S	2.06	15.80	LCDB · List
551.	(590333) 2011 WJ_{33}	4788	1.33	0.16	n.a.	Eos	S	2.82	15.50	LCDB · List
552.	(129925) 1999 TM_{127}	4788	1.33	0.17	n.a.	MBA (middle)	SC	3.04	15.70	LCDB · List
553.	(474966) 2005 TD_{59}	4788	1.33	0.24	n.a.	MBA (outer)	C	3.06	16.30	LCDB · List
554.	(449627) 2014 KQ_{6}	4788	1.33	0.15	n.a.	MBA (outer)	C	3.20	16.20	LCDB · List
555.	(210928) 2001 TN_{29}	4788	1.33	0.30	n.a.	MBA (outer)	C	3.35	16.10	LCDB · List
556.	(136729) 1995 UR_{57}	4788	1.33	0.05	n.a.	MBA (outer)	C	3.68	15.90	LCDB · List
557.	(355710) 2008 FA_{108}	4788	1.33	0.14	n.a.	MBA (outer)	C	4.63	15.40	LCDB · List
558.	2017 QX_{1}	4824	1.34	1.11	3	NEO	S	0.03	24.80	LCDB · MPC
559.	(152914) 2000 DK_{103}	4860	1.35	0.14	n.a.	Flora	S	1.18	16.80	LCDB · List
560.	Derm0h	4860	1.35	0.05	1	MBA (outer)	C	1.28	18.17	LCDB · —
561.	(160734) 2000 RS_{23}	4896	1.360	0.15	1	MBA (inner)	S	1.71	16.20	LCDB · List
562.	(16691) 1994 VS	4896	1.36	0.25	1	Flora	S	2.69	15.01	LCDB · List
563.	(35389) 1997 XO	4932	1.37	0.18	1	Erigone	S	4.29	14.69	LCDB · List
564.	2018 DX_{3}	4933	1.3702	0.24	3−	NEO	S	0.31	19.90	LCDB · MPC
565.	(884793) 2017 VR12	4959	1.37752	0.21	3−	NEO	V	0.12	21.10	LCDB · MPC
566.	(474163) 1999 SO_{5}	4968	1.380	0.73	3	NEO	S	0.20	20.90	LCDB · List
567.	2001 VF_{2}	5004	1.39	0.42	3−	NEO	S	0.25	20.40	LCDB · MPC
568.	(168089) 2006 DM_{84}	5004	1.39	0.40	1	MBA (inner)	S	0.91	17.58	LCDB · List
569.	7481 San Marcello	5040	1.4	0.08	1	MBA (outer)	C	16.73	12.54	LCDB · List
570.	2006 CL_{10}	5094	1.415	0.33	1+	NEO	S	0.16	21.30	LCDB · MPC
571.	(523609) 2005 PJ_{2}	5112	1.42	0.80	1	NEO	S	0.39	19.40	LCDB · List
572.	(152066) 2004 PT_{108}	5112	1.42	0.60	1+	MBA (inner)	S	1.31	16.78	LCDB · List
573.	(361072) 2006 AX_{46}	5148	1.43	0.17	n.a.	MBA (outer)	C	4.22	15.60	LCDB · List
574.	(424507) 2008 DZ_{80}	5184	1.44	0.25	1	MBA (inner)	S	0.61	18.45	LCDB · List
575.	2007 CX_{50}	5220	1.45	0.80	2	NEO	S	0.03	24.70	LCDB · MPC
576.	(235146) 2003 QE_{96}	5220	1.45	0.13	n.a.	Eunomia	S	1.83	16.00	LCDB · List
577.	(401316) 2013 AU_{6}	5220	1.45	0.25	n.a.	MBA (middle)	SC	2.65	16.00	LCDB · List
578.	2016 NK_{39}	5256	1.46	0.24	2	NEO	S	0.05	23.90	LCDB · MPC
579.	(268611) 2006 CY_{30}	5256	1.46	0.55	2−	MBA (outer)	C	2.69	16.58	LCDB · List
580.	2016 UU_{80}	5292	1.47	0.25	2	NEO	S	0.18	21.10	LCDB · MPC
581.	(253384) 2003 KQ_{3}	5292	1.47	0.45	1	Flora	S	0.74	17.81	LCDB · List
582.	2007 HL_{4}	5328	1.48	0.55	2+	NEO	S	0.04	24.20	LCDB · MPC
583.	Derm8e	5328	1.48	0.20	2−	MBA (inner)	S	0.09	22.49	LCDB · —
584.	(447572) 2006 TN_{66}	5385	1.4959	0.10	1	MBA (middle)	S	1.83	16.80	LCDB · List
585.	2016 LO_{48}	5400	1.5	0.45	2	NEO	S	0.03	25.40	LCDB · MPC
586.	2016 XT_{1}	5400	1.5	0.21	n.a.	NEO	S	0.34	19.70	LCDB · MPC
587.	(551188) 2012 XC_{136}	5400	1.5	0.25	n.a.	MBA (inner)	S	0.98	17.40	LCDB · List
588.	(230617) 2003 FW_{104}	5400	1.5	0.29	n.a.	MBA (inner)	S	1.03	17.30	LCDB · List
589.	(272132) 2005 MN_{35}	5400	1.5	0.11	n.a.	MBA (inner)	S	1.13	17.10	LCDB · List
590.	(147458) 2004 BY_{42}	5400	1.5	0.30	n.a.	Flora	S	1.18	16.80	LCDB · List
591.	(307096) 2002 AG_{203}	5400	1.5	0.56	n.a.	Vestian	S	1.24	16.90	LCDB · List
592.	(189707) 2001 TD_{148}	5400	1.5	0.16	n.a.	Vestian	S	1.71	16.20	LCDB · List
593.	(485219) 2010 UJ_{99}	5400	1.5	0.19	n.a.	MBA (outer)	C	4.03	15.70	LCDB · List
594.	(497646) 2006 RW_{41}	5552	1.5421	0.15	1	MBA (inner)	S	0.68	18.20	LCDB · List
595.	2016 PP_{27}	5580	1.55	0.26	2+	NEO	S	0.06	23.60	LCDB · MPC
596.	(218602) 2005 NE_{69}	5580	1.55	0.30	1+	MBA (inner)	S	0.96	17.45	LCDB · List
597.	(388169) 2006 AF_{62}	5652	1.57	0.84	1+	Nysa	S	0.78	17.86	LCDB · List
598.	(395057) 2009 FK_{3}	5652	1.57	0.31	n.a.	MBA (middle)	SC	1.92	16.70	LCDB · List
599.	(320292) 2007 RO_{221}	5652	1.57	0.97	1+	MBA (outer)	C	2.08	17.14	LCDB · List
600.	(616600) 2006 AN_{29}	5688	1.58	0.42	n.a.	Nysa	S	0.76	17.90	LCDB · List
601.	(428883) 2008 UL_{306}	5724	1.59	0.35	1	MBA (outer)	C	1.89	17.34	LCDB · List
602.	(334904) 2003 WL_{167}	5724	1.59	0.58	1+	MBA (outer)	C	2.10	17.12	LCDB · List
603.	(332984) 2011 FG_{67}	5724	1.59	0.40	1	MBA (outer)	C	3.64	15.92	LCDB · List
604.	Derm6e	5796	1.61	0.35	1	MBA (inner)	S	0.09	22.50	LCDB · —
605.	(154589) 2003 MX_{2}	5800	1.611	0.63	1+	NEO	S	1.42	16.60	LCDB · List
606.	1995 HM	5832	1.62	2.00	2	NEO	S	0.09	22.50	LCDB · MPC
607.	(641285) 2003 NF_{13}	5832	1.62	0.23	n.a.	MBA (middle)	SC	1.53	17.20	LCDB · List
608.	2014 MD_{6}	5868	1.63	0.17	1	NEO	S	0.15	21.50	LCDB · MPC
609.	Derm0f	5940	1.65	0.15	1	MBA (inner)	S	0.13	21.71	LCDB · —
610.	(144977) 2005 EC_{127}	5940	1.65	0.50	3	Flora	S	0.78	17.72	LCDB · List
611.	(342178) 2008 SJ_{184}	6012	1.67	0.15	n.a.	MBA (inner)	S	1.08	17.20	LCDB · List
612.	(133389) 2003 SA_{160}	6012	1.67	0.12	n.a.	MBA (middle)	SC	3.19	15.60	LCDB · List
613.	2015 TE	6048	1.68	0.19	1	NEO	S	0.09	22.50	LCDB · MPC
614.	(483656) 2005 ES_{70}	6084	1.69	0.55	2	NEO	S	0.05	23.80	LCDB · List
615.	(107679) 2001 FQ_{10}	6084	1.69	0.14	2	MBA (middle)	SC	3.19	15.60	LCDB · List
616.	2007 XN_{16}	6120	1.7	1.40	1+	NEO	S	0.02	25.50	LCDB · MPC
617.	2017 CP_{32}	6120	1.7	0.60	n.a.	NEO	S	0.05	24.00	LCDB · MPC
618.	(629529) 2002 QJ_{129}	6156	1.71	0.30	1	MBA (outer)	C	2.66	16.60	LCDB · List
619.	(190509) 2000 HX_{47}	6192	1.72	0.40	n.a.	Vestian	S	1.18	17.00	LCDB · List
620.	(187945) 2001 KJ_{43}	6192	1.72	0.28	n.a.	Flora	S	1.30	16.60	LCDB · List
621.	(700839) 2003 SO_{9}	6192	1.72	0.23	n.a.	MBA (middle)	SC	1.46	17.30	LCDB · List
622.	(344647) 2003 QT_{69}	6192	1.72	1.23	n.a.	MBA (middle)	SC	1.83	16.80	LCDB · List
623.	(288259) 2003 YL_{137}	6192	1.72	0.25	n.a.	MBA (outer)	C	3.20	16.20	LCDB · List
624.	2007 PS_{9}	6225	1.7292	0.03	1+	NEO	S	0.06	23.50	LCDB · MPC
625.	(255828) 2006 SC_{86}	6228	1.73	0.15	1+	MBA (inner)	S	0.62	18.42	LCDB · List
626.	2015 AA_{44}	6300	1.75	0.40	2	NEO	S	0.05	23.90	LCDB · MPC
627.	2017 BY_{93}	6300	1.75	0.14	1	NEO	S	0.07	23.10	LCDB · MPC
628.	2018 PJ_{10}	6300	1.75	0.27	2	NEO	S	0.16	21.30	LCDB · MPC
629.	(635756) 2014 DH_{97}	6300	1.75	0.32	n.a.	MBA (inner)	S	1.42	16.60	LCDB · List
630.	(352331) 2007 UY_{139}	6300	1.75	0.27	n.a.	MBA (outer)	C	3.68	15.90	LCDB · List
631.	(754863) 2016 UG_{94}	6336	1.76	0.47	3−	MBA (inner)	S	0.59	18.50	LCDB · List
632.	(233122) 2005 TP_{59}	6372	1.77	0.22	n.a.	Flora	S	0.86	17.50	LCDB · List
633.	(615445) 2003 QF_{115}	6372	1.77	0.57	n.a.	MBA (middle)	SC	1.27	17.60	LCDB · List
634.	(204545) 2005 ER_{186}	6372	1.77	0.39	n.a.	MBA (outer)	C	3.35	16.10	LCDB · List
635.	Derm5o	6408	1.78	0.12	1+	MBA (inner)	S	0.28	20.13	LCDB · —
636.	(387534) 2000 GX_{118}	6408	1.78	0.26	n.a.	Flora	S	0.68	18.00	LCDB · List
637.	(475202) 2005 VU_{10}	6408	1.78	0.23	n.a.	MBA (inner)	S	0.68	18.20	LCDB · List
638.	(741180) 2005 SQ_{51}	6408	1.78	0.25	n.a.	MBA (inner)	S	0.75	18.00	LCDB · List
639.	(388441) 2007 CT_{15}	6408	1.78	0.33	n.a.	Flora	S	0.94	17.30	LCDB · List
640.	(345327) 2005 YZ_{48}	6408	1.78	0.40	n.a.	MBA (inner)	S	0.98	17.40	LCDB · List
641.	(221827) 2008 EO_{78}	6408	1.78	0.32	n.a.	Flora	S	0.99	17.20	LCDB · List
642.	(341896) 2008 HR_{36}	6408	1.78	0.44	n.a.	MBA (inner)	S	1.03	17.30	LCDB · List
643.	(137246) 1999 RN_{63}	6408	1.78	0.18	n.a.	Flora	S	1.08	17.00	LCDB · List
644.	(174092) 2002 GV_{150}	6408	1.78	0.22	n.a.	Flora	S	1.08	17.00	LCDB · List
645.	(476919) 2008 WK_{83}	6408	1.78	0.15	n.a.	MBA (inner)	S	1.13	17.10	LCDB · List
646.	(105786) 2000 SD_{120}	6408	1.78	0.12	n.a.	Flora	S	1.18	16.80	LCDB · List
647.	(183085) 2002 RZ_{59}	6408	1.78	0.38	n.a.	Flora	S	1.36	16.50	LCDB · List
648.	(334707) 2003 FH_{45}	6408	1.78	0.39	n.a.	Vestian	S	1.36	16.70	LCDB · List
649.	(390260) 2012 XU_{131}	6408	1.78	0.54	n.a.	MBA (inner)	S	1.36	16.70	LCDB · List
650.	(398709) 2012 XL_{53}	6408	1.78	0.41	n.a.	MBA (middle)	SC	1.60	17.10	LCDB · List
651.	(78026) 2002 JJ_{72}	6408	1.78	0.93	n.a.	Flora	S	1.64	16.10	LCDB · List
652.	(82106) 2001 FG_{45}	6408	1.78	0.17	n.a.	Flora	S	1.64	16.10	LCDB · List
653.	(122184) 2000 KA_{58}	6408	1.78	0.18	n.a.	MBA (inner)	S	1.96	15.90	LCDB · List
654.	(22524) 1998 FB_{6}	6408	1.78	0.18	n.a.	Flora	S	1.97	15.70	LCDB · List
655.	(37378) 2001 VU_{76}	6408	1.780	0.23	2	Hungaria	ES	2.19	15.40	LCDB · List
656.	(481590) 2007 TJ_{169}	6408	1.78	0.25	n.a.	MBA (outer)	C	2.32	16.90	LCDB · List
657.	(129924) 1999 TK_{127}	6408	1.78	0.39	n.a.	MBA (middle)	SC	2.42	16.20	LCDB · List
658.	(317119) 2001 TJ_{255}	6408	1.78	0.26	n.a.	MBA (outer)	C	2.92	16.40	LCDB · List
659.	(443565) 2014 KX_{31}	6408	1.78	0.59	n.a.	MBA (outer)	C	2.92	16.40	LCDB · List
660.	(329346) 2001 QW_{292}	6408	1.78	1.02	n.a.	MBA (outer)	C	3.06	16.30	LCDB · List
661.	(591961) 2014 JD_{45}	6408	1.78	0.32	n.a.	MBA (outer)	C	3.35	16.10	LCDB · List
662.	(216388) 2008 CU_{75}	6408	1.78	0.27	n.a.	MBA (outer)	C	3.51	16.00	LCDB · List
663.	(259833) 2004 CZ_{26}	6408	1.78	0.16	n.a.	MBA (outer)	C	3.51	16.00	LCDB · List
664.	(189150) 2002 HV_{7}	6408	1.78	0.14	n.a.	MBA (outer)	C	4.03	15.70	LCDB · List
665.	(191530) 2003 UX_{197}	6408	1.78	0.56	2	MBA (outer)	C	4.32	15.55	LCDB · List
666.	2000 EB_{14}	6444	1.79	1.70	2	NEO	S	0.05	23.81	LCDB · MPC
667.	Derm4g	6444	1.79	0.10	1	MBA (inner)	S	0.24	20.47	LCDB · —
668.	2009 XO_{2}	6480	1.8	–	n.a.	NEO	S	0.06	23.50	LCDB · MPC
669.	Derm6j	6480	1.80	0.40	1+	MBA (outer)	C	0.40	20.69	LCDB · —
670.	(377173) 2003 UE_{7}	6480	1.8	0.10	n.a.	Mars crosser	S	0.90	17.60	LCDB · List
671.	(228833) 2003 DV_{3}	6480	1.8	0.19	1+	MBA (inner)	S	1.03	17.30	LCDB · List
672.	2007 AH_{12}	6491	1.803	0.04	2−	NEO	S	0.24	20.50	LCDB · MPC
673.	2012 BX34	6510	1.80828	0.20	3	NEO	S	0.01	27.60	LCDB · MPC
674.	2007 UG_{6}	6552	1.82	0.80	2	NEO	S	0.08	23.00	LCDB · MPC
675.	(495102) 2011 UU_{106}	6660	1.850	0.06	1+	NEO	S	0.52	18.80	LCDB · List
676.	(422865) 2002 PY_{105}	6660	1.85	0.45	n.a.	Flora	S	0.82	17.60	LCDB · List
677.	2018 JE_{1}	6696	1.86	0.44	2	NEO	S	0.31	19.90	LCDB · MPC
678.	Derm2g	6732	1.87	0.16	1+	MBA (inner)	S	0.15	21.41	LCDB · —
679.	(337226) 2000 EL_{98}	6732	1.87	0.53	1	MBA (inner)	S	0.75	17.98	LCDB · List
680.	(391985) 2008 YH_{9}	6732	1.87	0.67	n.a.	MBA (inner)	S	1.13	17.10	LCDB · List
681.	(353535) 2011 SY_{166}	6768	1.88	0.33	n.a.	Koronis	S	1.18	16.80	LCDB · List
682.	(389966) 2012 TZ_{200}	6768	1.88	0.25	n.a.	Vestian	S	1.24	16.90	LCDB · List
683.	(70858) 1999 VH_{126}	6768	1.88	0.17	n.a.	MBA (middle)	SC	3.04	15.70	LCDB · List
684.	(413516) 2005 SS_{16}	6804	1.89	0.40	1+	MBA (middle)	SC	1.08	17.95	LCDB · List
685.	(474969) 2005 TH_{63}	6840	1.9	0.33	n.a.	MBA (inner)	S	0.75	18.00	LCDB · List
686.	(266128) 2006 TB_{27}	6840	1.9	0.27	n.a.	Flora	S	0.86	17.50	LCDB · List
687.	(342067) 2008 SD_{24}	6840	1.9	0.30	n.a.	MBA (inner)	S	0.86	17.70	LCDB · List
688.	(471746) 2012 UL_{58}	6840	1.9	0.31	n.a.	MBA (inner)	S	0.86	17.70	LCDB · List
689.	(322937) 2002 GG	6840	1.9	0.32	n.a.	Flora	S	0.94	17.30	LCDB · List
690.	(228490) 2001 SL_{211}	6840	1.9	0.15	n.a.	MBA (inner)	S	0.98	17.40	LCDB · List
691.	(232058) 2001 UL_{108}	6840	1.9	0.26	n.a.	MBA (inner)	S	0.98	17.40	LCDB · List
692.	(336131) 2008 PH_{11}	6840	1.9	0.27	n.a.	MBA (inner)	S	1.03	17.30	LCDB · List
693.	(337549) 2001 SL_{256}	6840	1.9	0.48	n.a.	MBA (inner)	S	1.08	17.20	LCDB · List
694.	(350259) 2012 TV_{155}	6840	1.9	0.33	n.a.	MBA (inner)	S	1.08	17.20	LCDB · List
695.	(79214) 1994 GS_{6}	6840	1.9	0.32	n.a.	Flora	S	1.13	16.90	LCDB · List
696.	(272201) 2005 QT_{17}	6840	1.9	0.39	n.a.	MBA (inner)	S	1.18	17.00	LCDB · List
697.	(52906) 1998 SW_{81}	6840	1.9	0.07	n.a.	Flora	S	1.24	16.70	LCDB · List
698.	(275600) 1999 VC_{163}	6840	1.9	0.21	n.a.	MBA (inner)	S	1.36	16.70	LCDB · List
699.	(216036) 2006 DY_{9}	6840	1.9	0.12	n.a.	MBA (inner)	S	1.42	16.60	LCDB · List
700.	(125871) 2001 XA_{195}	6840	1.9	0.14	n.a.	Nysa	S	1.52	16.40	LCDB · List
701.	(168315) 1982 RA_{1}	6840	1.9	0.24	2−	Mars crosser	S	1.56	16.40	LCDB · List
702.	(430902) 2005 SW_{49}	6840	1.9	0.40	n.a.	Erigone	C	1.76	17.50	LCDB · List
703.	(260970) 2005 SL_{55}	6840	1.9	0.92	n.a.	Themis	C	2.83	16.10	LCDB · List
704.	(308996) 2006 UV_{37}	6840	1.9	0.34	n.a.	MBA (outer)	C	3.68	15.90	LCDB · List
705.	(243005) 2006 UC_{9}	6840	1.9	0.23	n.a.	MBA (outer)	C	4.22	15.60	LCDB · List
706.	2013 ET	6852	1.9032	1.06	3−	NEO	S	0.07	23.10	LCDB · MPC
707.	(217411) 2005 LD_{50}	6876	1.91	0.50	1+	MBA (inner)	S	1.39	16.65	LCDB · List
708.	(518640) 2008 KZ_{5}	6912	1.92	0.11	1+	NEO	S	0.28	20.10	LCDB · List
709.	Derm5b	6948	1.93	0.09	2−	MBA (inner)	S	0.19	20.99	LCDB · —
710.	(754364) 2016 PB_{75}	6948	1.93	0.31	n.a.	Nysa	S	0.84	17.70	LCDB · List
711.	(166648) 2002 TQ_{7}	6948	1.93	0.22	n.a.	MBA (outer)	C	4.63	15.40	LCDB · List
712.	(620071) 2011 WN_{15}	7013	1.948	0.15	2+	NEO	S	0.36	19.60	LCDB · List
713.	598719 Alegalli	7020	1.95	0.46	n.a.	MBA (middle)	SC	1.92	16.70	LCDB · List
714.	(60716) 2000 GD_{65}	7030	1.9529	0.29	3	MBA (inner)	S	2.25	15.60	LCDB · List
715.	2014 HS_{184}	7041	1.9557	1.13	2	NEO	S	0.07	23.30	LCDB · MPC
716.	(40511) 1999 RE_{88}	7056	1.96	1.04	3−	MBA (inner)	S	1.30	16.80	LCDB · List
717.	(529227) 2009 SV_{352}	7092	1.97	0.34	n.a.	Flora	S	0.65	18.10	LCDB · List
718.	(677103) 2016 SK_{21}	7092	1.97	0.38	n.a.	MBA (inner)	S	0.86	17.70	LCDB · List
719.	(319692) 2006 TJ_{105}	7092	1.97	0.27	n.a.	Flora	S	0.86	17.50	LCDB · List
720.	(181508) 2006 UC_{45}	7092	1.97	0.74	n.a.	Flora	S	0.90	17.40	LCDB · List
721.	(232052) 2001 UK_{40}	7092	1.97	0.24	n.a.	Nysa	S	0.92	17.50	LCDB · List
722.	(278006) 2006 UE_{168}	7092	1.97	0.13	n.a.	Flora	S	0.94	17.30	LCDB · List
723.	(388113) 2005 UP_{402}	7092	1.97	0.38	n.a.	MBA (inner)	S	0.94	17.50	LCDB · List
724.	(272529) 2005 UY_{281}	7092	1.97	0.42	n.a.	Nysa	S	0.96	17.40	LCDB · List
725.	(285971) 2001 RW_{109}	7092	1.97	0.72	n.a.	MBA (inner)	S	0.98	17.40	LCDB · List
726.	(274966) 2009 SV_{333}	7092	1.97	0.26	n.a.	Flora	S	0.99	17.20	LCDB · List
727.	(127467) 2002 RX_{41}	7092	1.97	0.18	n.a.	Flora	S	1.08	17.00	LCDB · List
728.	(225872) 2001 XG_{260}	7092	1.97	0.37	n.a.	Nysa	S	1.10	17.10	LCDB · List
729.	(384835) 2012 RG_{40}	7092	1.97	0.25	n.a.	Nysa	S	1.10	17.10	LCDB · List
730.	(271070) 2003 JC_{5}	7092	1.97	0.37	n.a.	MBA (inner)	S	1.13	17.10	LCDB · List
731.	(228791) 2002 YQ_{29}	7092	1.97	0.30	n.a.	MBA (inner)	S	1.30	16.80	LCDB · List
732.	(202843) 2008 SV_{264}	7092	1.97	0.37	n.a.	MBA (inner)	S	1.36	16.70	LCDB · List
733.	(71926) 2000 WN_{59}	7092	1.97	0.16	n.a.	Flora	S	1.49	16.30	LCDB · List
734.	(86865) 2000 HV_{16}	7092	1.97	0.28	n.a.	Nysa	S	1.59	16.30	LCDB · List
735.	(95143) 2002 AQ_{164}	7092	1.97	0.11	n.a.	Nysa	S	1.59	16.30	LCDB · List
736.	(347980) 2003 SQ_{91}	7092	1.97	0.68	n.a.	MBA (middle)	SC	1.60	17.10	LCDB · List
737.	(195143) 2002 CS_{194}	7092	1.97	0.47	n.a.	MBA (inner)	S	1.63	16.30	LCDB · List
738.	(388074) 2005 UQ_{47}	7092	1.97	0.26	n.a.	Erigone	C	1.93	17.30	LCDB · List
739.	(27925) 1997 CJ_{1}	7092	1.97	0.32	n.a.	Flora	S	2.26	15.40	LCDB · List
740.	(238181) 2003 SO_{237}	7092	1.97	0.21	n.a.	MBA (middle)	SC	2.53	16.10	LCDB · List
741.	24138 Benjaminlu	7092	1.97	0.31	n.a.	Flora	S	2.59	15.10	LCDB · List
742.	(388737) 2007 VS_{270}	7092	1.97	0.27	n.a.	MBA (outer)	C	2.79	16.50	LCDB · List
743.	(352068) 2006 WL_{94}	7092	1.97	0.37	n.a.	MBA (outer)	C	2.92	16.40	LCDB · List
744.	(379842) 2011 UK_{178}	7092	1.97	0.27	n.a.	MBA (outer)	C	2.92	16.40	LCDB · List
745.	(494294) 2016 RP_{29}	7092	1.97	0.42	n.a.	MBA (outer)	C	2.92	16.40	LCDB · List
746.	(475078) 2005 UZ_{156}	7092	1.97	1.01	n.a.	MBA (outer)	C	3.06	16.30	LCDB · List
747.	(119820) 2002 AG_{175}	7092	1.97	0.23	n.a.	MBA (outer)	C	4.63	15.40	LCDB · List
748.	(8183) 1992 UE3	7092	1.97	0.05	n.a.	Koronis	S	5.93	13.30	LCDB · List
749.	(104087) 2000 EV_{32}	7128	1.98	0.20	n.a.	Vestian	S	2.25	15.60	LCDB · List
750.	(144898) 2004 VD17	7164	1.99	0.21	2	NEO	E	0.32	18.90	LCDB · List
751.	2016 UY_{68}	7164	1.99	0.49	2	MBA (middle)	SC	0.84	18.50	LCDB · MPC
752.	(100351) 1995 SU_{88}	7164	1.99	0.55	1	MBA (inner)	S	0.94	17.50	LCDB · List
753.	(476215) 2007 US_{107}	7164	1.99	0.36	3−	MBA (outer)	C	1.84	17.40	LCDB · List

back to top

== Periods 2–2.2 hours ==
#	Minor planet designation	Rotation period		Δmag	Quality (U)	Orbit or family	Spectral type	Diameter (km)	Abs. mag (H)	Refs
#	Minor planet designation	(seconds)	(hours)	Δmag	Quality (U)	Orbit or family	Spectral type	Diameter (km)	Abs. mag (H)	Refs
754.	2014 FA_{7}	7200	2.	0.20	1+	NEO	S	0.01	26.70	LCDB · MPC
755.	2017 EK_{3}	7200	2	0.30	2	NEO	S	0.02	26.30	LCDB · MPC
756.	2016 VP_{4}	7200	2.0	0.92	2−	NEO	S	0.04	24.20	LCDB · MPC
757.	2016 HP_{3}	7200	2	1.00	2	NEO	S	0.05	23.70	LCDB · MPC
758.	2016 HN_{2}	7200	2	0.20	2−	NEO	S	0.06	23.50	LCDB · MPC
759.	2010 JE_{88}	7200	2.000	0.20	1+	NEO	S	0.15	21.50	LCDB · MPC
760.	2016 VU_{3}	7200	2.0	0.68	n.a.	NEO	S	0.23	20.60	LCDB · MPC
761.	2003 OX_{5}	7200	2.0	0.30	n.a.	Mars crosser	S	0.30	20.00	LCDB · MPC
762.	(806847) 2016 XX_{23}	7200	2.	0.96	2−	Mars crosser	S	0.90	17.60	LCDB · List
763.	(475979) 2007 PM_{4}	7200	2.0	0.45	n.a.	Mars crosser	S	0.98	17.40	LCDB · List
764.	(345781) 2007 EZ_{184}	7200	2.00	0.30	1	Flora	S	1.03	17.10	LCDB · List
765.	(613918) 2007 YK_{1}	7200	2.0	0.06	1	MBA (outer)	C	4.42	15.50	LCDB · List
766.	(613620) 2006 UZ_{184}	7200	2.	0.20	n.a.	TNO	C	100.81	8.10	LCDB · List
767.	(41653) 2000 SC_{294}	7225	2.007	0.08	1	Flora	S	2.31	15.35	LCDB · List
768.	2015 CW_{12}	7236	2.01	0.20	2	NEO	S	0.08	23.00	LCDB · MPC
769.	(434279) 2003 XO_{15}	7236	2.01	0.40	2−	MBA (inner)	S	2.15	15.70	LCDB · List
770.	(10750) 1989 PT	7236	2.010	0.08	1	Flora	S	3.13	14.69	LCDB · List
771.	2013 NJ	7272	2.02	0.07	2	NEO	S	0.12	22.00	LCDB · MPC
772.	Derm1c	7272	2.02	0.16	2−	MBA (inner)	S	0.13	21.74	LCDB · —
773.	(811739) 2001 QK_{328}	7272	2.02	0.62	n.a.	MBA (inner)	S	0.75	18.00	LCDB · List
774.	(615201) 2002 QK_{91}	7272	2.02	0.35	n.a.	Flora	S	0.75	17.80	LCDB · List
775.	(321110) 2008 TF_{94}	7272	2.02	0.36	n.a.	MBA (inner)	S	0.98	17.40	LCDB · List
776.	(476873) 2008 VR_{23}	7272	2.02	0.37	n.a.	MBA (inner)	S	0.98	17.40	LCDB · List
777.	(276322) 2002 TC_{205}	7272	2.02	0.31	n.a.	Flora	S	1.18	16.80	LCDB · List
778.	(511980) 2015 KE_{75}	7272	2.02	0.23	n.a.	MBA (inner)	S	1.24	16.90	LCDB · List
779.	(443269) 2014 ET_{18}	7272	2.02	0.50	n.a.	MBA (inner)	S	1.30	16.80	LCDB · List
780.	(58885) 1998 HA_{142}	7272	2.02	0.14	n.a.	Flora	S	1.56	16.20	LCDB · List
781.	(114235) 2002 VZ_{133}	7272	2.02	0.15	n.a.	Flora	S	1.56	16.20	LCDB · List
782.	(347976) 2003 SM_{70}	7272	2.02	0.33	n.a.	MBA (middle)	SC	1.92	16.70	LCDB · List
783.	(587069) 2005 SN_{286}	7272	2.02	0.37	n.a.	MBA (outer)	C	2.32	16.90	LCDB · List
784.	(477653) 2010 NH_{45}	7272	2.02	0.52	n.a.	MBA (outer)	C	3.20	16.20	LCDB · List
785.	(362810) 2011 YG_{27}	7272	2.02	0.42	n.a.	MBA (outer)	C	3.68	15.90	LCDB · List
786.	(439671) 2014 HH_{169}	7272	2.02	0.42	n.a.	MBA (outer)	C	3.85	15.80	LCDB · List
787.	(480702) 2015 PX_{173}	7272	2.02	0.41	n.a.	MBA (outer)	C	3.85	15.80	LCDB · List
788.	(168411) 1998 HO_{113}	7272	2.02	0.42	n.a.	MBA (outer)	C	5.08	15.20	LCDB · List
789.	(253390) 2003 KL_{32}	7272	2.02	0.21	n.a.	MBA (outer)	C	5.32	15.10	LCDB · List
790.	(35596) 1998 HZ_{117}	7290	2.025	0.09	1	MBA (inner)	S	3.77	14.48	LCDB · List
791.	(59879) 1999 RM_{119}	7294	2.026	0.09	1	MBA (outer)	C	8.35	14.12	LCDB · List
792.	(30823) 1990 SY15	7301	2.028	0.10	1	Flora	S	3.42	14.50	LCDB · List
793.	Derm9e	7344	2.04	0.15	2−	MBA (outer)	C	1.07	18.55	LCDB · —
794.	(247827) 2003 SN_{198}	7351	2.042	0.08	1	Mars crosser	S	1.21	16.95	LCDB · List
795.	(44858) 1999 UZ_{13}	7358	2.044	0.09	1	Flora	S	1.24	16.69	LCDB · List
796.	(516253) 2016 UG_{105}	7380	2.05	0.34	2	MBA (inner)	S	0.94	17.50	LCDB · List
797.	(475989) 2007 PZ_{42}	7380	2.05	0.26	n.a.	Eunomia	S	1.27	16.80	LCDB · List
798.	(108616) 2001 ML_{25}	7380	2.050	0.08	1	Eunomia	S	2.58	15.25	LCDB · List
799.	(14805) 1981 ED_{15}	7391	2.053	0.09	1	MBA (inner)	S	2.82	15.11	LCDB · List
800.	13608 Andosatoru	7391	2.053	0.06	1	Flora	S	3.94	14.19	LCDB · List
801.	(15226) 1986 UP	7391	2.053	0.50	2	Phocaea	S	4.38	14.01	LCDB · List
802.	(32068) 2000 JE_{58}	7394	2.054	0.53	2	MBA (outer)	C	6.05	14.82	LCDB · List
803.	(51519) 2001 FT_{109}	7405	2.057	0.08	1	Flora	S	1.70	16.02	LCDB · List
804.	(21067) 1991 PY_{1}	7409	2.058	0.10	1	Vestian	S	2.44	15.43	LCDB · List
805.	(21982) 1999 XL_{8}	7412	2.059	0.09	1	Flora	S	2.25	15.41	LCDB · List
806.	Derm4e	7416	2.06	0.15	2−	MBA (inner)	S	0.21	20.69	LCDB · —
807.	(67395) 2000 PR	7420	2.061	0.07	1	Flora	S	1.49	16.31	LCDB · List
808.	(342266) 2008 SS_{309}	7452	2.07	0.79	2	MBA (middle)	S	1.53	17.20	LCDB · List
809.	(310876) 2003 KV_{33}	7452	2.07	0.16	3−	MBA (outer)	C	3.51	16.00	LCDB · List
810.	(129127) 2004 XA_{167}	7456	2.071	0.09	1	MBA (middle)	S	2.64	16.01	LCDB · List
811.	(49668) 1999 OP_{2}	7459	2.072	0.08	1	Hungaria	E	1.57	15.94	LCDB · List
812.	(442037) 2010 PR_{66}	7464	2.0734	1.00	3	NEO	S	0.70	19.30	LCDB · List
813.	(54818) 2001 NR	7466	2.074	0.42	2	MBA (inner)	S	2.47	15.40	LCDB · List
814.	(46566) 1991 RW21	7466	2.074	0.06	1	MBA (inner)	S	3.24	14.82	LCDB · List
815.	(185877) 2000 OB_{8}	7474	2.076	0.06	1	MBA (middle)	S	3.44	15.43	LCDB · List
816.	(43286) 2000 EA_{158}	7477	2.077	0.09	1	MBA (middle)	S	5.56	14.39	LCDB · List
817.	(78856) 2003 QR_{68}	7510	2.086	0.05	1	Flora	S	1.19	16.80	LCDB · List
818.	(25626) 2000 AD_{50}	7510	2.086	0.27	2	Nysa	S	2.65	15.20	LCDB · List
819.	(203173) 2000 YL_{98}	7524	2.09	0.47	2−	MBA (inner)	S	1.56	16.40	LCDB · List
820.	(465048) 2006 RY_{41}	7542	2.0950	0.10	1	MBA (inner)	S	0.90	17.60	LCDB · List
821.	(46840) 1998 QZ_{17}	7542	2.095	0.09	1	Flora	S	2.97	14.80	LCDB · List
822.	2015 SY	7560	2.1	0.35	2	NEO	S	0.07	23.30	LCDB · MPC
823.	(120042) 2003 BQ_{9}	7560	2.10	0.31	2	Flora	S	1.08	17.00	LCDB · List
824.	2016 TX_{6}	7560	2.10	0.41	2	MBA (middle)	SC	1.10	17.90	LCDB · MPC
825.	(45810) 2000 QP_{32}	7560	2.1	0.16	1	Flora	S	2.23	15.32	LCDB · List
826.	(48362) 2184 T-2	7567	2.102	0.24	2	MBA (inner)	S	1.30	16.79	LCDB · List
827.	2343 Siding Spring	7584	2.10659	0.19	3	MBA (inner)	S	6.50	13.30	LCDB · List
828.	(81080) 2000 ET_{88}	7592	2.109	0.10	1	MBA (inner)	S	2.57	15.32	LCDB · List
829.	(144039) 2004 BL_{25}	7596	2.11	0.20	2	MBA (inner)	S	1.18	17.00	LCDB · List
830.	(68063) 2000 YJ66	7597	2.1102	0.14	3−	NEO	S	2.36	15.50	LCDB · List
831.	(47373) 1999 XT_{91}	7600	2.111	0.10	1	Eunomia	S	3.71	14.47	LCDB · List
832.	(37854) 1998 EY_{11}	7603	2.112	0.08	1	MBA (inner)	S	3.33	14.75	LCDB · List
833.	(86052) 1999 RM_{2}	7603	2.112	0.09	1	MBA (outer)	C	7.58	14.33	LCDB · List
834.	(189023) 1999 NV_{19}	7607	2.113	0.08	1	MBA (outer)	C	5.37	15.08	LCDB · List
835.	19185 Guarneri	7618	2.116	0.08	1	MBA (middle)	S	5.29	14.50	LCDB · List
836.	2014 YD	7632	2.12	0.20	2+	NEO	S	0.04	24.30	LCDB · MPC
837.	(29075) 1950 DA	7638	2.1216	0.20	3	NEO	S	1.25	18.00	LCDB · List
838.	25549 Jonsauer	7646	2.124	0.27	2	Vestian	S	2.32	15.54	LCDB · List
839.	11801 Frigeri	7657	2.127	0.07	1	MBA (outer)	C	12.01	13.33	LCDB · List
840.	Derm7p	7668	2.13	0.26	2−	MBA (inner)	C	0.18	21.11	LCDB · —
841.	(160035) 1998 WQ_{27}	7668	2.13	0.64	2+	MBA (inner)	S	1.08	17.20	LCDB · List
842.	(113846) 2002 TV_{239}	7668	2.13	0.20	1	Flora	S	2.75	16.93	LCDB · List
843.	(333733) 2009 VV_{71}	7679	2.133	0.09	1	Flora	S	0.70	17.94	LCDB · List
844.	(52820) 1998 RS_{2}	7683	2.13412	–	2	Flora	C	1.88	15.80	LCDB · List
845.	(824263) 2016 UY_{19}	7704	2.14	0.21	2	Nysa	S	0.66	18.20	LCDB · List
846.	(21946) 1999 VD_{138}	7708	2.141	0.06	1	MBA (inner)	S	4.24	14.23	LCDB · List
847.	(113886) 2002 TG_{266}	7718	2.144	0.07	1	MBA (inner)	S	2.64	15.26	LCDB · List
848.	(72295) 2001 BO_{24}	7722	2.145	0.07	1	Flora	S	1.48	16.31	LCDB · List
849.	(108472) 2001 KF_{57}	7726	2.146	0.08	1	MBA (middle)	S	3.27	15.55	LCDB · List
850.	2017 BM_{123}	7740	2.150	0.37	3−	NEO	S	0.05	23.70	LCDB · MPC
851.	2017 BQ6	7740	2.150	0.38	2	NEO	S	0.16	21.40	LCDB · MPC
852.	Derm6l	7740	2.15	0.11	2−	MBA (inner)	S	0.47	18.99	LCDB · —
853.	19141 Poelkapelle	7740	2.150	0.08	1	Flora	S	2.71	15.00	LCDB · List
854.	2565 Grogler	7740	2.150	0.41	2	MBA (inner)	S	3.45	14.68	LCDB · List
855.	(39783) 1997 LB_{1}	7740	2.15	0.36	1+	MBA (outer)	C	8.46	14.02	LCDB · List
856.	3599 Basov	7776	2.16	0.10	2	Themis	C	14.26	12.59	LCDB · List
857.	(70364) 1999 RN_{194}	7794	2.165	0.05	1	MBA (inner)	S	2.17	15.69	LCDB · List
858.	(87309) 2000 QP	7794	2.1651	0.10	2	NEO	S	0.90	17.60	LCDB · List
859.	(474279) 2001 UK_{31}	7812	2.17	0.26	2	Nysa	S	0.88	17.60	LCDB · List
860.	(53523) 2000 AC_{153}	7819	2.172	0.09	1	Flora	S	2.60	15.09	LCDB · List
861.	2915 Moskvina	7837	2.177	0.47	2	Eunomia	S	5.69	13.54	LCDB · List
862.	50866 Davidesprizzi	7844	2.179	0.09	1	Eunomia	S	5.43	13.64	LCDB · List
863.	(59881) 1999 RZ_{121}	7844	2.179	0.37	2	MBA (outer)	C	6.36	14.71	LCDB · List
864.	9362 Miyajima	7844	2.179	0.07	1	MBA (middle)	S	9.34	13.26	LCDB · List
865.	2013 XX_{8}	7848	2.18	0.43	2	NEO	S	0.04	24.40	LCDB · MPC
866.	Derm7d	7848	2.18	0.12	1	MBA (inner)	S	0.12	22.00	LCDB · —
867.	(253475) 2003 SJ_{55}	7852	2.181	0.78	2	MBA (inner)	S	0.84	17.75	LCDB · List
868.	Derm7g	7884	2.19	0.15	2−	MBA (outer)	C	0.53	20.06	LCDB · —
869.	(153027) 2000 OP	7884	2.19	0.62	2	Nysa	S	1.15	17.00	LCDB · List
870.	181249 Tkachenko	7884	2.19	0.06	1+	MBA (outer)	C	4.42	15.50	LCDB · List
871.	(47506) 2000 AA_{58}	7891	2.192	0.08	1	MBA (inner)	S	3.66	14.55	LCDB · List
872.	(101954) 1999 RY_{33}	7898	2.194	0.45	2	MBA (outer)	C	3.87	15.79	LCDB · List
873.	(179924) 2002 VM_{59}	7906	2.196	0.13	1	Eunomia	S	1.92	15.90	LCDB · List
874.	(75910) 2000 CO_{53}	7913	2.198	0.37	2	MBA (outer)	C	11.11	13.50	LCDB · List
875.	Derm7j	7920	2.20	0.20	2−	MBA (outer)	C	0.57	19.93	LCDB · —
876.	(488299) 2016 UK_{50}	7920	2.20	0.80	2	MBA (middle)	SC	1.39	17.40	LCDB · List
877.	(96069) 6060 P-L	7920	2.20	0.20	2	MBA (inner)	S	2.20	15.65	LCDB · List
878.	(512826) 2016 UN_{107}	7920	2.20	0.46	2	MBA (outer)	C	2.54	16.70	LCDB · List
879.	(93195) 2000 SV_{112}	7920	2.2	0.52	1	MBA (middle)	S	2.71	15.94	LCDB · List
880.	(63573) 2001 QG_{23}	7920	2.20	0.15	2	MBA (inner)	S	3.29	14.78	LCDB · List

back to top
