= List of asteroid close approaches to Earth in 2012 =

- Asteroids which came closer to Earth than the Moon in 2012 by time of discovery
- After closest approach: 6 (26.1%)
- < 24 hours before: 1 (4.3%)
- up to 7 days before: 13 (56.5%)
- > one week before: 2 (8.7%)
- > 7 weeks before: 0 (0.0%)
- > one year before: 1 (4.3%)
Other years

List of asteroid close approaches to Earth in 2012 is a listing of asteroids noted for their close approach to planet Earth

== Timeline of close approaches less than one lunar distance from Earth in 2012 ==
A list of known near-Earth asteroid close approaches less than 1 lunar distance (384,400 km or 0.00257 AU) from Earth in 2012, based on the close approach database of the Center for Near-Earth Object Studies (CNEOS).

The CNEOS database of close approaches lists some close approaches a full orbit or more before the discovery of the object, derived by orbit calculation. The list below only includes close approaches that are evidenced by observations, thus the pre-discovery close approaches would only be included if the object was found by precovery, but there was no such close approach in 2012.

This list and the relevant databases do not consider impacts as close approaches, thus this list does not include any of the objects that collided with Earth's atmosphere in 2012, none of which were discovered in advance, but were observed visually or recorded by sensors designed to detect detonation of nuclear devices.

Rows highlighted red indicate objects which were not discovered until after closest approach

Rows highlighted yellow indicate objects discovered less than 24 hours before closest approach

Rows highlighted green indicate objects discovered more than one week before closest approach

Rows highlighted turquoise indicate objects discovered more than 7 weeks before closest approach

Rows highlighted blue indicate objects discovered more than one year before closest approach
(i.e. objects successfully cataloged on a previous orbit, rather than being detected during final approach)

Date of closest approach	Date discovered	Object	Nominal geocentric distance (AU) (Note: Distance from the center of Earth to the center of the object. See the NASA/JPL Solar System Dynamics Glossary: Geocentric. Earth has a radius of approximately 6,400 km.)	Size (m) (approximate)	(H) (abs. mag.)	Closer approach to Moon	Refs
2012-01-02	2011-12-31	2011 YB_{63}	0.00156 AU (233,000 km; 145,000 mi)	2.9–6.5	29.8		data · 2011 YB_{63}
2012-01-20	2012-01-18	2012 BV_{1}	0.00213 AU (319,000 km; 198,000 mi)	1.7–3.8	31.0	Yes	data · 2012 BV_{1}
2012-01-27	2012-01-25	2012 BX34	0.000437 AU (65,400 km; 40,600 mi)	8–18	27.6		data · 2012 BX_{34}
2012-02-20	2012-02-22	2012 DY_{13}	0.00073 AU (109,000 km; 68,000 mi)	7.3–16	27.8		data · 2012 DY_{13}
2012-03-01	2012-03-02	2012 EZ_{1}	0.00155 AU (232,000 km; 144,000 mi)	4.6–10	28.8		data · 2012 EZ_{1}
2012-03-26	2012-03-24	2012 FP35	0.00107 AU (160,000 km; 99,000 mi)	7–16	27.9		data · 2012 FP_{35}
2012-03-26	2012-03-25	2012 FS_{35}	0.000431 AU (64,500 km; 40,100 mi)	5	30.2		data · 2012 FS_{35}
2012-04-01	2012-03-13	2012 EG5	0.00154 AU (230,000 km; 143,000 mi)	37–82	24.3		data · 2012 EG_{5}
2012-04-19	2012-04-21	2012 HM_{13}	0.00188 AU (281,000 km; 175,000 mi)	6.1–14	28.2		data · 2012 HM_{13}
2012-05-13	2012-05-12	2012 JU	0.00136 AU (203,000 km; 126,000 mi)	5.8–13	28.3		data · 2012 JU
2012-05-17	2012-05-16	2012 KA	0.00150 AU (224,000 km; 139,000 mi)	5.2–12	28.6		data · 2012 KA
2012-05-19	2010-05-23	2010 KK_{37}	0.00148 AU (221,000 km; 138,000 mi)	19–43	25.7		data · 2010 KK_{37}
2012-05-28	2012-05-23	2012 KP24	0.00038 AU (57,000 km; 35,000 mi)	14–30	26.4		data · 2012 KP_{24}
2012-05-29	2012-05-28	2012 KT42	0.000139 AU (20,800 km; 12,900 mi)	4.2–9.4	29.0		data · 2012 KT_{42}
2012-06-21	2012-06-23	2012 MF_{7}	0.00212 AU (317,000 km; 197,000 mi)	1125	26.9	Yes	data · 2012 MF_{7}
2012-10-07	2012-10-05	2012 TV	0.00170 AU (254,000 km; 158,000 mi)	24–53	25.2		data · 2012 TV
2012-10-09	2012-10-10	2012 TM_{79}	0.000615 AU (92,000 km; 57,200 mi)	13–28	26.6		data · 2012 TM_{79}
2012-10-12	2012-10-04	2012 TC4	0.000635 AU (95,000 km; 59,000 mi)	12–27	26.7		data · 2012 TC_{4}
2012-11-12	2012-11-14	2012 VH_{77}	0.00133 AU (199,000 km; 124,000 mi)	9.2–21	27.3		data · 2012 VH_{77}
2012-11-14	2012-11-12	2012 VJ_{38}	0.00151 AU (226,000 km; 140,000 mi)	5.3–12	28.5		data · 2012 VJ_{38}
2012-12-11	2012-12-09	2012 XE_{54}	0.00150 AU (224,000 km; 139,000 mi)	22–49	25.4		data · 2012 XE_{54}
2012-12-14	2012-12-11	2012 XB_{112}	0.00212 AU (317,000 km; 197,000 mi)	2–3	29.9		data · 2012 XB_{112}
2012-12-15	2012-12-13	2012 XL_{134}	0.00184 AU (275,000 km; 171,000 mi)	7.3–16	27.8		data · 2012 XL_{134}

=== Warning times by size ===
This sub-section visualises the warning times of the close approaches listed in the above table, depending on the size of the asteroid. The sizes of the charts show the relative sizes of the asteroids to scale. For comparison, the approximate size of a person is also shown. This is based the absolute magnitude of each asteroid, an approximate measure of size based on brightness.

Absolute magnitude H ≥ 30 (smallest)

Silhouette of man standing and facing forward

(size of a person for comparison)

Absolute magnitude 30 > H ≥ 29

Absolute magnitude 29 > H ≥ 28

Absolute magnitude 28 > H ≥ 27

Absolute magnitude 27 > H ≥ 26

Absolute magnitude 26 > H ≥ 25

Absolute magnitude 25 > H (largest)

- After closest approach: 0 (0.0%)
- < 24 hours before: 0 (0.0%)
- up to 7 days before: 0 (0.0%)
- > one week before: 1 (100.0%)
- > 7 weeks before: 0 (0.0%)
- > one year before: 0 (0.0%)

== See also ==
- List of asteroid close approaches to Earth
- List of asteroid close approaches to Earth in 2011
- List of asteroid close approaches to Earth in 2013
