= 2012 TV =

Near-Earth asteroid in 2012/2022

Discovery
- Discovered by: Tenagra II Observatory
- Discovery site: Nogales, Arizona
- Discovery date: October 5, 2012

Designations
- Alternative designations: MPO 240124
- Minor planet category: Apollo NEO risk listed

Orbital characteristics
- Epoch 2022-Jan-21 (JD 2459600.5)
- Uncertainty parameter 7
- Observation arc: 1.8 days
- Aphelion: 2.361 AU (353.2 Gm)
- Perihelion: 0.6439 AU (96.33 Gm)
- Semi-major axis: 1.502 AU (224.7 Gm)
- Eccentricity: 0.5714
- Orbital period (sidereal): 1.84 yr (672.7 d)
- Mean anomaly: 348°
- Mean motion: 0° 32^{m} 6.72^{s} /day
- Inclination: 5.54°
- Longitude of ascending node: 193.4°
- Time of perihelion: 2022-Feb-12.6 ± 1.5 days
- Argument of perihelion: 270.0°
- Earth MOID: 0.002 AU (300,000 km)
- Mercury MOID: 0.34112 AU (51,031,000 km)
- Jupiter MOID: 2.83676 AU (424.373 Gm)

Physical characteristics
- Dimensions: 24–54 meters
- Sidereal rotation period: 0.0525 hr
- Absolute magnitude (H): 25.2

2012 TV is a near-Earth Apollo asteroid with an estimated diameter of 30 metres (98 ft). Its closest approach to the Earth was on 7 October 2012, with a distance of 0.0017 astronomical units (250,000 km; 160,000 mi). It also approached the Moon an hour earlier with a distance of 0.0028 astronomical units (420,000 km; 260,000 mi). With a short observation arc of 1.8 days, the asteroid is listed on the Sentry Risk Table and has a 1:500,000 chance of impacting Earth on 2 April 2081.

As it will come to perihelion in mid-February 2022, it will be approaching Earth from the direction of the Sun. The closest approach possible during April 2022 is 0.66 LD (250,000 km), but it is expected to pass millions of kilometers from Earth.

2022 close approach
Date	JPL SBDB nominal geocentric distance	uncertainty region (3-sigma)
2022-04-05.2 ± 4.3 days	7.4 million km	± 11.6 million km

== See also ==
- List of asteroid close approaches to Earth in 2022
- List of asteroid close approaches to Earth in 2012
- 2012 TC4
- 2012 EG5
