= 1999 SF10 =

Near-Earth asteroid

1999 SF_{10}
Discovery (Note: Discoverer not yet assigned by the MPC)
- Discovery date: 30 September 1999 (Initial reported obs.)

Designations
- Minor planet category: NEO · Apollo

Orbital characteristics
- Epoch 21 November 2025 (JD 2461000.5)
- Uncertainty parameter 0
- Aphelion: 1.6039 AU
- Perihelion: 0.9550 AU
- Semi-major axis: 1.2795 AU
- Eccentricity: 0.2536
- Orbital period (sidereal): 1.4473 y (528.62 d)
- Mean anomaly: 1.251°
- Mean motion: 0.6810° / d
- Inclination: 1.2081°
- Longitude of ascending node: 25.817°
- Argument of perihelion: 27.975°
- Earth MOID: 0.0038 AU
- T_{Jupiter}: 5.026

Physical characteristics
- Dimensions: 85 m × 55 m
- Mean diameter: 60 m
- Sidereal rotation period: 2.4663±0.0005
- Geometric albedo: 0.117
- Absolute magnitude (H): 24.46

1999 SF_{10} is a small, quickly rotating unnamed near-Earth asteroid (NEA). First observed on 30 September 1999 by the Lincoln Near-Earth Asteroid Research (LINEAR) program in Socorro, New Mexico, United States, it is an Earth-crossing Apollo asteroid. Its diameter is estimated to be around 60 metres (200 ft) in size with a very rapid rotation period of 2.47 minutes, indicating that it is a monolithic object.

== History ==
1999 SF_{10} was first observed on 30 September 1999 by the Lincoln Near-Earth Asteroid Research (LINEAR) program from its Experimental Test Site (ETS) in Socorro, New Mexico, United States. It was given the provisional designation 1999 SF_{10} by the Minor Planet Center (MPC), and its detection was announced in a Minor Planet Electronic Circular on 4 October 1999. At the time of its first observation, it was rapidly approaching Earth, and on 12 October it passed within a distance of 0.0076 astronomical units (AU; 3.0 LD).

As of 2025, it has not been numbered or named by the MPC. It also has not been formally assigned a discoverer, which will happen when it is numbered.

== Orbit ==
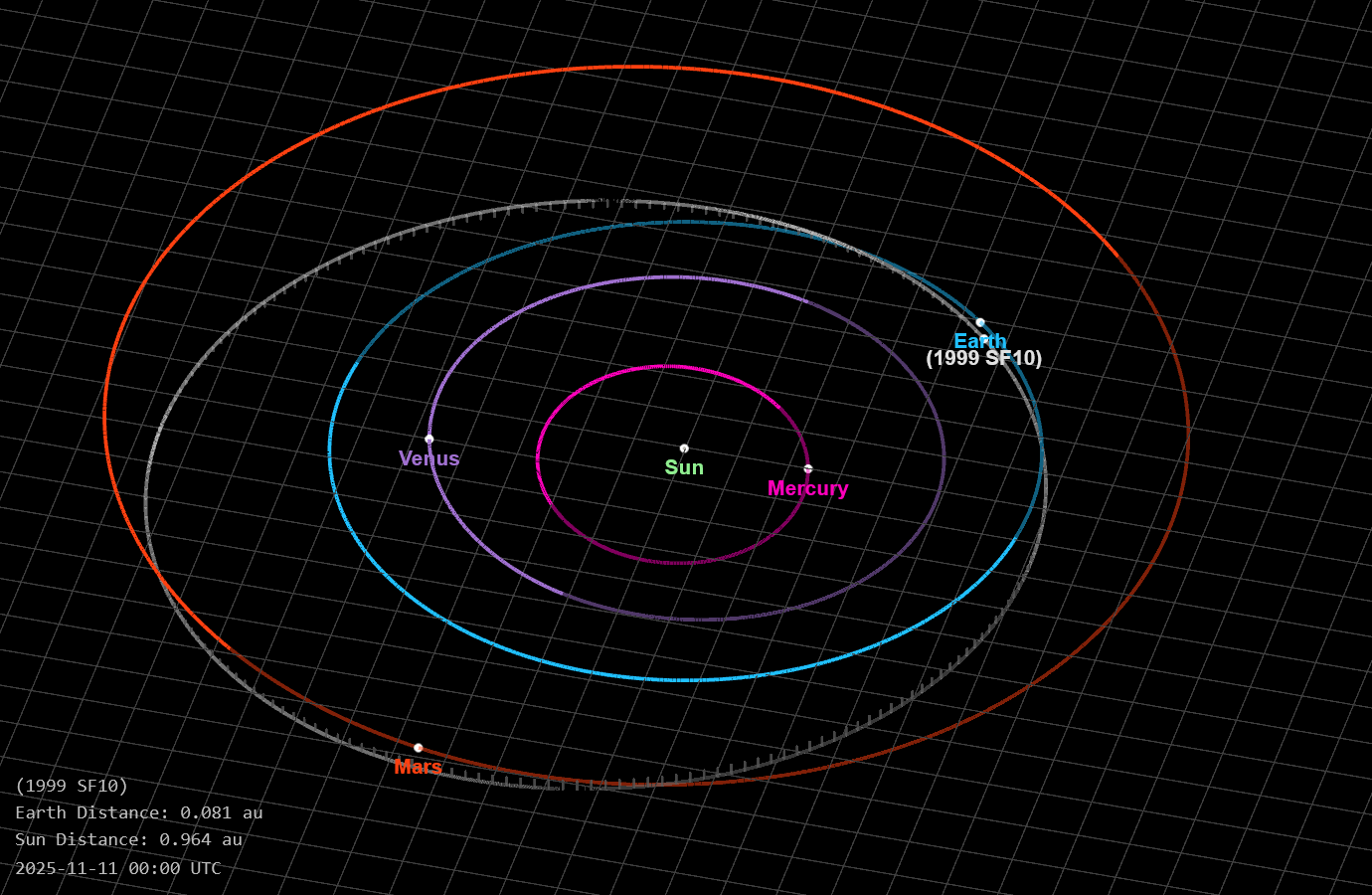
Diagram showing 1999 SF_{10}'s orbit in the inner Solar System. The ecliptic grid is shown.

1999 SF_{10} is classified as a near-Earth asteroid (NEA). It orbits the Sun at an average distance—its semi-major axis—of 1.28 AU, taking 1.45 years to complete one revolution. It has a low orbital inclination of 1.45° relative to the ecliptic plane. Along its orbit, its distance from the Sun varies between 0.96 AU at perihelion to 1.60 AU at aphelion due to its orbital eccentricity of 0.25. Because its perihelion lies below 1 AU, it is also classified as an Earth-crossing Apollo asteroid.

== Physical characteristics ==
1999 SF_{10} has an estimated mean diameter of 60 metres (200 ft) with dimensions of 85 by 55 metres (279 ft × 180 ft), assuming a geometric albedo of 0.110–0.117; its estimated size may be off by a factor of 2. Observations of its lightcurve, or variations in its observed brightness, suggest that it has a rotation period of 2.47 minutes, classifying it as a monolithic fast-rotating asteroid (MFRA). MFRAs have rotation periods much faster than those typically observed in asteroids, rotating faster than the critical period below which a strengthless body will self-destruct due to centrifugal forces.

== See also ==
- List of fast rotators (minor planets)
