= 2012 FN =

Small near-Earth asteroid

Discovery
- Discovered by: Mount Lemmon Survey (G96)
- Discovery date: 17 March 2012

Designations
- Minor planet category: Apollo NEO

Orbital characteristics
- Epoch 17 March 2012 (JD 2456003.5)
- Uncertainty parameter 9
- Aphelion: 1.4500 AU (216.92 Gm)
- Perihelion: 0.99291 AU (148.537 Gm)
- Semi-major axis: 1.2214 AU (182.72 Gm)
- Eccentricity: 0.18710
- Orbital period (sidereal): 1.35 yr (493.07 d)
- Mean anomaly: 21.742°
- Mean motion: 0° 43^{m} 48.432^{s} /day
- Inclination: 3.2329°
- Longitude of ascending node: 356.91°
- Argument of perihelion: 147.89°
- Earth MOID: 0.015601 AU (2.3339 Gm)
- Jupiter MOID: 3.54794 AU (530.764 Gm)

Physical characteristics
- Dimensions: ~5 meters (16 ft)
- Absolute magnitude (H): 29.2

2012 FN is an Apollo asteroid and a near-Earth object that has a 1 in 4 billion chance of impacting Earth on 7 March 2113. It is estimated to be 5 meters in diameter, which means that it poses no threat if it impacts Earth. An impact would have the kinetic energy of about 3 kt of TNT, and would probably result in an air burst in the upper atmosphere. It is the least threatening asteroid listed on the Sentry Risk Table. The very short observation arc of only 3 hours results in a very poorly constrained orbit, and it could just as easily be 2 AU from Earth on 7 March 2113.

== See also ==
- List of Apollo asteroids
- 2012 FP35
