= 2012 FP35 =

Near-Earth asteroid

Discovery
- Discovered by: Catalina Sky Survey
- Discovery date: 24 March 2012

Orbital characteristics
- Epoch 13 January 2016 (JD 2457400.5)
- Uncertainty parameter 6
- Observation arc: 2 days
- Aphelion: 1.98245 AU (296.570 Gm)
- Perihelion: 0.74954 AU (112.130 Gm)
- Semi-major axis: 1.36599 AU (204.349 Gm)
- Eccentricity: 0.45128
- Orbital period (sidereal): 1.60 yr (583.14 d)
- Mean anomaly: 104.24°
- Mean motion: 0° 37^{m} 2.46^{s} /day
- Inclination: 8.9764°
- Longitude of ascending node: 185.36°
- Argument of perihelion: 79.010°
- Earth MOID: 0.00128544 AU (192,299 km)
- Jupiter MOID: 3.134 AU (468.8 Gm)

Physical characteristics
- Dimensions: 7–15 meters
- Absolute magnitude (H): 27.9

2012 FP_{35} is an Apollo asteroid about 11 meters in diameter that makes close approaches to Earth. It orbits the Sun every 583.2 days, in an ellipse between 0.749 AU and 1.983 AU from the Sun. It was discovered on 24 March 2012 by the Catalina Sky Survey.

It may have passed as close as 0.00036 AU (54,000 km; 33,000 mi) from Earth in late March 2001, but more likely passed 0.02 AU from Earth. It came within 0.00107 AU (160,000 km; 99,000 mi) of Earth on 26 March 2012. The asteroid is about 7–15 meters in diameter.

The size of the asteroid is estimated from the absolute magnitude.

== See also ==
- 2012 FN
- List of asteroid close approaches to Earth in 2012
