= 2012 KP24 =

Chelyabinsk-sized near-Earth asteroid

2012 KP_{24}
Discovery
- Discovered by: MLS
- Discovery site: Mount Lemmon Obs.
- Discovery date: 23 May 2012

Designations
- Minor planet category: Apollo · NEO

Orbital characteristics
- Epoch 2022-Aug-09 (JD 2459800.5)
- Uncertainty parameter 6
- Observation arc: 5 days
- Aphelion: 2.0514 AU (Q)
- Perihelion: 0.94483 AU (q)
- Semi-major axis: 1.4981 AU (a)
- Eccentricity: 0.36932 (e)
- Orbital period (sidereal): 1.83 years
- Mean anomaly: 182.83° (M)
- Mean motion: 0° 32^{m} 14.388^{s} /day
- Inclination: 18.467° (i)
- Longitude of ascending node: 67.445° (Ω)
- Time of perihelion: ~2023-Jul-04
- Argument of perihelion: 221.51° (ω)
- Earth MOID: 0.0002 AU (30,000 km; 0.078 LD)

Physical characteristics
- Mean diameter: 17 m
- Mass: 7.2×10^{6} kg (est.)
- Synodic rotation period: 0.041667 h
- Apparent magnitude: 13.3 (2012 passage); 21.6? (2023 passage)
- Absolute magnitude (H): 26.4

2012 KP_{24} is a Chelyabinsk-sized near-Earth asteroid with an observation arc of only 5 days and has a modestly determined orbit for an object of its size. Around 31 May 2023 ±3 days it passed between 0.19–24 lunar distances (73,000–9,200,000 km) from Earth. Nominally the asteroid is expected to pass 0.026 AU (3,900,000 km; 10 LD) from Earth and brighten to around apparent magnitude 21.6.

It is a fast rotator that rotates in 0.04 hours (2.4 min). The asteroid is estimated to be 17 meters (56 ft) in diameter. It will next come to perihelion (closest approach to the Sun) around 4 July 2023. It has an orbital uncertainty parameter of 6.

== 2012 ==
It was discovered on 23 May 2012 by the Mount Lemmon Survey at an apparent magnitude of 20.8 using a 1.5-meter (59 in) reflecting telescope. On 28 May 2012 at 15:20 UT, the asteroid passed 0.00038 AU (57,000 km; 35,000 mi) from the center-point of Earth. It then reached perihelion on 2 July 2012. It was removed from the Sentry Risk Table on 8 August 2013 after Sentry updated to planetary ephemeris (DE431).

== 2032 ==
Newer versions of Sentry returned the object to the risk table. Virtual clones of the asteroid that fit the uncertainty region in the known trajectory show a 1 in 2.1 million chance that the asteroid could impact Earth on 2032 May 28. With a Palermo Technical Scale of −6.30, the odds of impact by 2012 KP_{24} in 2032 are about 2 million times less than the background hazard level of Earth impacts which is defined as the average risk posed by objects of the same size or larger over the years until the date of the potential impact.
