= 2012 BX34 =

Near-Earth asteroid

2012 BX_{34}
Discovery
- Discovered by: Catalina Sky Survey
- Discovery date: 25 January 2012

Designations
- Minor planet category: Aten

Orbital characteristics
- Epoch 13 January 2016 (JD 2457400.5)
- Uncertainty parameter 3
- Aphelion: 1.0332 AU (154.56 Gm) (Q)
- Perihelion: 0.48892 AU (73.141 Gm) (q)
- Semi-major axis: 0.76105 AU (113.851 Gm) (a)
- Eccentricity: 0.35757 (e)
- Orbital period (sidereal): 0.66 yr (242.5 d)
- Average orbital speed: 1.48200135°/day
- Mean anomaly: 211.76° (M)
- Mean motion: 1.4845°/day (n)
- Inclination: 10.527° (i)
- Longitude of ascending node: 306.74° (Ω)
- Argument of perihelion: 335.834° (ω)
- Earth MOID: 0.000288322 AU (43,132.4 km)
- Jupiter MOID: 4.09701 AU (612.904 Gm)

Physical characteristics
- Dimensions: ~8 meters (26 ft)
- Synodic rotation period: 1.80828 h (0.075345 d)
- Apparent magnitude: ~13.9 to 30.3
- Absolute magnitude (H): 27.6

2012 BX_{34} is a small Aten asteroid that made one of the closest recorded asteroid close approaches of Earth on 27 January 2012. It passed within 0.0004371 AU (65,390 km; 40,630 mi) of Earth during its closest approach at 15:25 GMT. 2012 BX_{34} measures around 8 meters (26 ft) across; if it had impacted in 2012, it would have been too small to pass through Earth's atmosphere intact.

During its 2012 close approach to Earth, 2012 BX_{34} had a brightest apparent magnitude of about 13.9, making it about as bright as the dwarf planet Pluto. By 25 February 2012, it had dimmed to magnitude 30. During its close approach of 0.0246 AU (3,680,000 km; 2,290,000 mi) on 28 January 2014, it will only reach a magnitude of about 23. 2012 BX_{34} has been observed in more detail using radar astronomy.

Animation of 2012 BX34's orbit around Sun 2012 BX34 · Sun · Earth

== See also ==
- List of asteroid close approaches to Earth in 2012
