= 2012 KT42 =

Asteroid

2012 KT_{42}
Designations
- Minor planet category: Apollo; NEO

Orbital characteristics
- Epoch 13 January 2016 (JD 2457400.5)
- Uncertainty parameter 5
- Aphelion: 2.4839 AU (371.59 Gm)
- Perihelion: 0.71144 AU (106.430 Gm)
- Periastron: 94.628°
- Semi-major axis: 1.5977 AU (239.01 Gm)
- Eccentricity: 0.55470
- Orbital period (sidereal): 2.02 yr (737.60 d)
- Mean anomaly: 261.31°
- Mean motion: 0° 29^{m} 17.052^{s} / day
- Inclination: 2.1932°
- Longitude of ascending node: 69.515°
- Argument of perihelion: 259.13°
- Earth MOID: 0.000968708 AU (144,916.7 km)

Physical characteristics
- Dimensions: ~4–10 metres
- Synodic rotation period: 0.06057 h (3.634 min)
- Absolute magnitude (H): 29; 29.0

2012 KT_{42} is an Apollo near-Earth asteroid first observed by astronomer Alex R. Gibbs of the Mount Lemmon Survey with a 1.5-meter reflecting telescope on 28 May 2012.

== Overview ==
The asteroid had a close approach to the Earth on 29 May 2012, approaching to only ~8950 miles (~14,440 km) above the planet's surface. This means 2012 KT_{42} came inside the Clarke Belt of geosynchronous satellites. In May 2012, the estimated 5- to 10-metre-wide asteroid ranked #6 on the top 20 list of closest-approaches to Earth. There was no danger of a collision during the close approach. 2012 KT_{42} passed roughly 0.01 AU (1,500,000 km; 930,000 mi) from Venus on 8 July 2012.

It is estimated that an impact would produce an upper atmosphere air burst equivalent to 11 kt TNT, roughly equal to Hiroshima's Little Boy. The asteroid would be vaporized as these small impacts occur approximately once per year. A comparable-sized object caused the Sutter's Mill meteorite in California on 2 April 2012. It was removed from the Sentry Risk Table on 30 May 2012.
