= 2012 EG5 =

Near-Earth asteroid

2012 EG_{5}
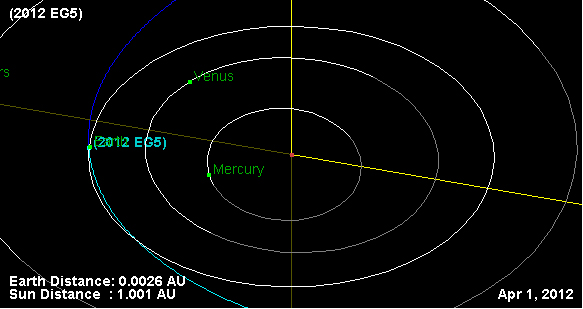
- The orbit of the asteroid 2012 EG5 during its flyby on 1 April 2012. The asteroids path is shown by the blue line.

Discovery
- Discovered by: Pan-STARRS
- Discovery site: Haleakala Observatory, Haleakalā, Hawaii
- Discovery date: 13 March 2012

Designations
- Alternative designations: MPO 230288
- Minor planet category: Apollo NEO

Orbital characteristics
- Epoch 4 September 2017 (JD 2458000.5)
- Uncertainty parameter 3
- Observation arc: 21 d
- Aphelion: 3.31229 AU (495.512 Gm)
- Perihelion: 0.98483 AU (147.328 Gm)
- Semi-major axis: 2.14856 AU (321.420 Gm)
- Eccentricity: 0.54163
- Orbital period (sidereal): 3.15 yr (1150.32 d); 3.15 yr
- Mean anomaly: 256.02°
- Mean motion: 0° 18^{m} 46.512^{s} /day
- Inclination: 3.02915°
- Longitude of ascending node: 192.919°
- Argument of perihelion: 16.002°
- Earth MOID: 0.0000309134 AU (4,624.58 km)
- Mercury MOID: 0.54576 AU (81,645,000 km)
- Jupiter MOID: 1.64413 AU (245.958 Gm)

Physical characteristics
- Sidereal rotation period: 0.29240 hr
- Absolute magnitude (H): 24.3

2012 EG_{5} is an Apollo near-Earth asteroid with an estimated diameter of 47 meters (154 ft). The asteroid was discovered on 13 March 2012. The asteroid came within 0.001539 AU (230,200 km; 143,100 mi) of Earth during its closest approach on 1 April 2012, just over half the distance between Earth and the Moon's orbit. It was briefly listed on the Sentry Risk Table with a 1 in 2,778,000 chance of an impact in 2107. It was removed from the Sentry Risk Table on 1 April 2012.
