= List of asteroid close approaches to Earth in 2015 =

- Asteroids which came closer to Earth than the Moon in 2015 by time of discovery
- After closest approach: 17 (63.0%)
- < 24 hours before: 3 (11.1%)
- up to 7 days before: 6 (22.2%)
- > one week before: 1 (3.7%)
- > 7 weeks before: 0 (0.0%)
- > one year before: 0 (0.0%)
Other years

Below is the list of asteroid close approaches to Earth in 2015.

== Timeline of known close approaches less than one lunar distance from Earth in 2015 ==
A list of known near-Earth asteroid close approaches less than 1 lunar distance (384,400 km or 0.00257 AU) from Earth in 2015, based on the close approach database of the Center for Near-Earth Object Studies (CNEOS).

The CNEOS database of close approaches lists some close approaches a full orbit or more before the discovery of the object, derived by orbit calculation. The list below only includes close approaches that are evidenced by observations, thus the pre-discovery close approaches would only be included if the object was found by precovery, but there was no such close approach in 2015.

This list and relevant databases do not consider impacts as close approaches, thus this list does not include any of the 43 objects that collided with Earth's atmosphere in 2015, none of which were discovered in advance, but were observed visually or recorded by sensors designed to detect detonation of nuclear devices.

Rows highlighted red indicate objects which were not discovered until after closest approach

Rows highlighted yellow indicate objects discovered less than 24 hours before closest approach

Rows highlighted green indicate objects discovered more than one week before closest approach

Rows highlighted turquoise indicate objects discovered more than 7 weeks before closest approach

Rows highlighted blue indicate objects discovered more than one year before closest approach
(i.e. objects successfully cataloged on a previous orbit, rather than being detected during final approach)

Date of closest approach	Date discovered	Object	Nominal geocentric distance (AU) (Note: Distance from the center of Earth to the center of the object. See the NASA/JPL Solar System Dynamics Glossary: Geocentric. Earth has a radius of approximately 6,400 km.)	Nominal geocentric distance (LD)	Size (m) (approximate)	(H) (abs. mag.)	Closer approach to Moon	Refs
2015-01-14	2015-01-15	2015 AQ_{43}	0.00105 AU (157,000 km; 98,000 mi)	0.41	6.7–15	28.0		data · 2015 AQ43
2015-01-18	2015-01-27	2015 BP513	0.00160 AU (239,000 km; 149,000 mi)	0.62	12–27	26.7	Yes	data · 2015 BP513
2015-01-20	2015-01-21	2015 BE_{511}	0.00108 AU (162,000 km; 100,000 mi)	0.42	5.1–11	28.6		data · 2015 BE511
2015-02-11	2015-02-12	2015 CH_{13}	0.00189 AU (283,000 km; 176,000 mi)	0.73	5.1–11	28.6		data · 2015 CH13
2015-02-17	2015-02-18	2015 DD_{1}	0.000262 AU (39,200 km; 24,400 mi)	0.10	2.2–4.9	30.4		data · 2015 DD1
2015-02-18	2015-02-19	2015 DQ_{224}	0.000723 AU (108,200 km; 67,200 mi)	0.28	3.7–8.2	29.3		data · 2015 DQ224
2015-03-10	2015-03-11	2015 ET	0.000835 AU (124,900 km; 77,600 mi)	0.33	12–27	26.7		data · 2015 ET
2015-03-12	2015-03-11	2015 EO_{6}	0.000732 AU (109,500 km; 68,000 mi)	0.28	2.4–5.4	30.2		data · 2015 EO6
2015-03-16	2015-03-17	2015 FU_{344}	0.00255 AU (381,000 km; 237,000 mi)	0.99	1.7–3.8	31.0		data · 2015 FU344
2015-03-28	2015-03-25	2015 FM_{118}	0.00238 AU (356,000 km; 221,000 mi)	0.92	4.8–11	28.7		data · 2015 FM118
2015-04-12	2015-04-11	2015 GU	0.000739 AU (110,600 km; 68,700 mi)	0.29	5.6–12	28.4		data · 2015 GU
2015-04-14	2015-04-16	2015 HG_{182}	0.00220 AU (329,000 km; 205,000 mi)	0.86	4.8–11	28.7	Yes	data · 2015 HG182
2015-04-16	2015-04-15	2015 GL_{13}	0.00124 AU (186,000 km; 115,000 mi)	0.48	4.6–10	28.8	Yes	data · 2015 GL13
2015-04-21	2015-04-18	2015 HD_{1}	0.000395 AU (59,100 km; 36,700 mi)	0.15	8.8–20	27.4		data · 2015 HD1
2015-05-15	2015-05-12	2015 JF_{1}	0.00208 AU (311,000 km; 193,000 mi)	0.81	6.4–14	28.1	Yes	data · 2015 JF1
2015-05-23	2015-05-25	2015 KW_{121}	0.00191 AU (286,000 km; 178,000 mi)	0.74	16–36	26.1		data · 2015 KW121
2015-06-08	2015-06-07	2015 LF	0.00132 AU (197,000 km; 123,000 mi)	0.51	13–28	26.6		data · 2015 LF
2015-08-06	2015-08-07	2015 PK	0.000531 AU (79,400 km; 49,400 mi)	0.21	6.3–14	28.1		data · 2015 PK
2015-09-22	2015-09-24	2015 SK_{7}	0.000178 AU (26,600 km; 16,500 mi)	0.07	4.4–9.9	28.9		data · 2015 SK7
2015-10-13	2015-10-11	2015 TC25	0.000741 AU (110,900 km; 68,900 mi)	0.29	3.6–8.1; 2	29.3		data · 2015 TC25
2015-10-22	2015-10-24	2015 UM_{52}	0.000871 AU (130,300 km; 81,000 mi)	0.34	7.3–16	27.8		data · 2015 UM52
2015-11-05	2015-11-07	2015 VP_{64}	0.00187 AU (280,000 km; 174,000 mi)	0.73	5.8–13	28.3	Yes	data · 2015 VP64
2015-11-06	2015-11-08	2015 VU_{64}	0.000671 AU (100,400 km; 62,400 mi)	0.26	2–4.5	30.6		data · 2015 VU64
2015-11-15	2015-11-14	2015 VY_{105}	0.000231 AU (34,600 km; 21,500 mi)	0.09	4.2–9.4	29.0		data · 2015 VY105
2015-11-20	2015-11-21	2015 WP_{2}	0.00154 AU (230,000 km; 143,000 mi)	0.60	2.5–5.7	30.1	Yes	data · 2015 WP2
2015-12-13	2015-12-16	2015 YJ	0.000476 AU (71,200 km; 44,200 mi)	0.19	6.1–14	28.2		data · 2015 YJ
2015-12-15	2015-12-06	2015 XY261	0.00193 AU (289,000 km; 179,000 mi)	0.75	9.7–22	27.2		data · 2015 XY261

=== Warning times by size ===
This sub-section visualises the warning times of the close approaches listed in the above table, depending on the size of the asteroid. The sizes of the charts show the relative sizes of the asteroids to scale. For comparison, the approximate size of a person is also shown. This is based the absolute magnitude of each asteroid, an approximate measure of size based on brightness.

Absolute magnitude H ≥ 30 (smallest)

Silhouette of man standing and facing forward

(size of a person for comparison)

Absolute magnitude 30 > H ≥ 29

Absolute magnitude 29 > H ≥ 28

Absolute magnitude 28 > H ≥ 27

Absolute magnitude 27 > H ≥ 26

- After closest approach: 3 (75.0%)
- < 24 hours before: 0 (0.0%)
- up to 7 days before: 1 (25.0%)
- > one week before: 0 (0.0%)
- > 7 weeks before: 0 (0.0%)
- > one year before: 0 (0.0%)

Absolute magnitude 26 > H ≥ 25

None

Absolute magnitude 25 > H (largest)

None

== Additional examples ==
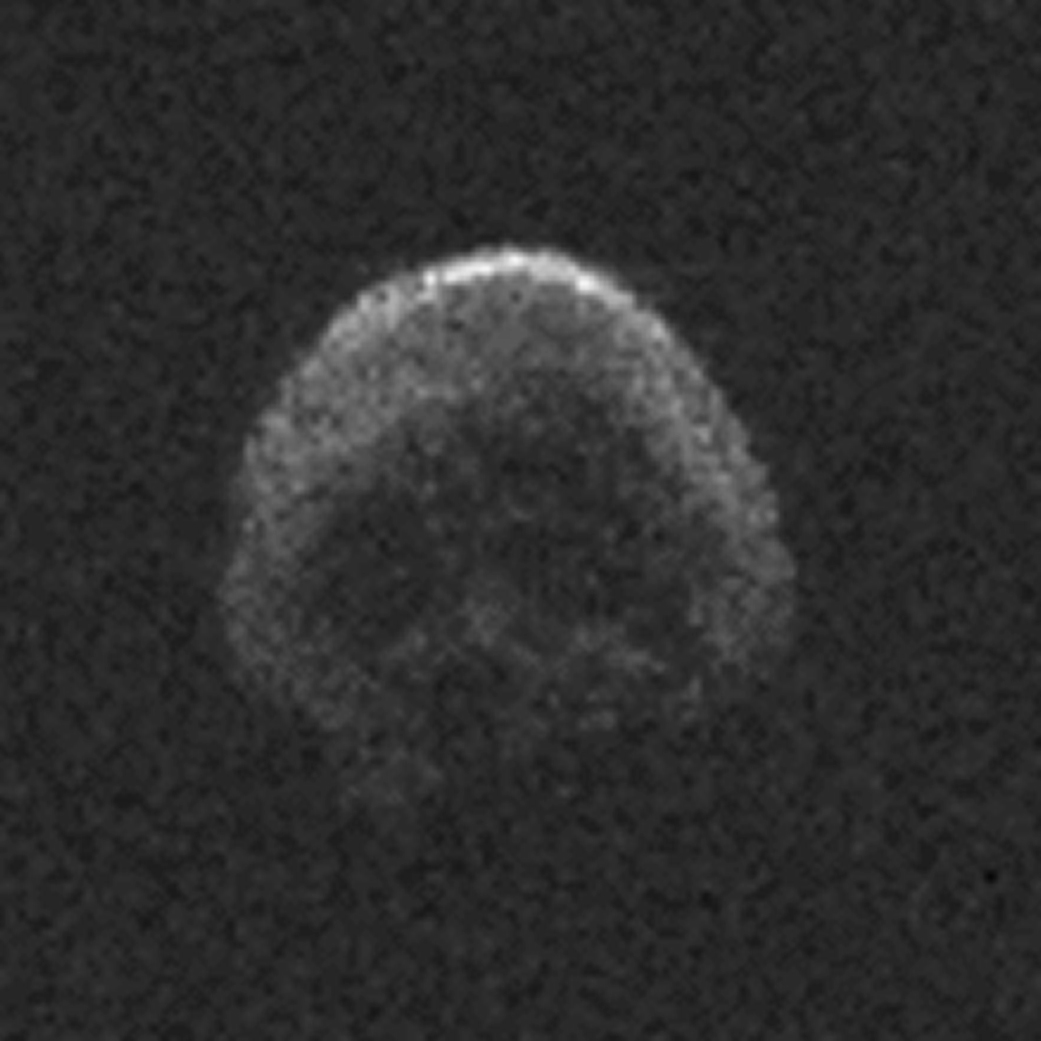
2015 TB145 was radar imaged in late October 2015

An example list of near-Earth asteroids that passed more than 1 lunar distance (384,400 km or 0.00256 AU) from Earth in 2015.

- 2015 AK_{1} (~50 meters in diameter) passed 5.57 lunar distances from Earth on 18 January 2015.
- 2015 BC (~60 meters in diameter) passed 1.64 lunar distances from Earth (1.50 lunar distances from the Moon) on 20 January 2015.
- (357439) 2004 BL86 (~700 meters in diameter) passed 3.1 lunar distances (1.2 million km) from Earth on 26 January 2015.
- 2015 AZ43 (~70 meters in diameter) passed 0.0197 AU (2,950,000 km; 1,830,000 mi) from Earth on 15 February 2015.
- 2014 YB35 (~500 meters in diameter) passed 11.7 lunar distances (4 million km) from Earth on 2015 Mar 27.
- 2015 FW_{117} (~110 meters in diameter) passed 3.6 lunar distances (1.38 million km) (3.2 lunar distances from the Moon) (1.21 million km) on 1 April 2015.
- 2015 HM10 (~80 meters in diameter) passed 1.15 lunar distances (440,000 km) (1.08 lunar distances from the Moon) (410,000 km) on 7 July 2015.
- 2015 TQ_{21} (~15 meters in diameter) passed 1.005 lunar distances (390,000 km) on 7 October 2015
- 2014 UR (~20 meters in diameter) passed 3.81 lunar distances (1.46 million km) from Earth on 18 October 2015.
- 2015 TB145 (~600 meters in diameter) passed 1.3 lunar distances (480,000 km) (0.74 lunar distances from the Moon) (286,000 km) on 31 October 2015.
- 2015 VO_{142} (~6 meters in diameter) passed 1.02 lunar distances (393,000 km) (0.85 lunar distances from the Moon) (327,000 km) on 24 November 2015
- Risk-listed asteroid 2007 VE191 (~60 meters in diameter) was not observed when it probably passed roughly 0.5 AU (75,000,000 km; 46,000,000 mi) from Earth on 27 November 2015.
- 2015 YB initially calculated to make a close approach to Earth on 19 December 2015 turned out to be a much further away inner main-belt asteroid. On 31 December 2015 the asteroid received the designation 2015 YU9.

== Timeline of close approaches less than one Lunar distance from the Moon in 2015 ==
The number of asteroids listed here are significantly less than those of asteroids approaching Earth for several reasons:

- Asteroids approaching Earth not only move faster, but are brighter and are easier to detect with modern surveys due to these factors
- Asteroids approaching closer to Earth are higher priority to confirm, and only confirmed asteroids are listed with a lunocentric approach distance
- Those which make close approaches to the Moon are frequently lost in its glare, making them harder to confirm, and are more easily discovered during the new Moon, when the Moon is too close to the Sun for any asteroids to be detected while they are near to the Moon anyway.

These factors combined severely limit the amount of Moon-approaching asteroids, to a level many times lower than the detected asteroids to pass just as close to Earth instead.

Date of closest approach	Object	Nominal lunocentric distance (AU) (Note: Distance from the center of the Moon to the center of the object. the Moon has a radius of approximately 1,740 km.)	Nominal lunocentric distance (LD)	Size (m) (approximate)	(H)	approach distance to Earth (LD)
2015-01-12	2015 BY_{3}	0.00212 AU (317,000 km; 197,000 mi)	0.82	7–22	27.5	1.43
2015-01-18	2015 BP513	0.000824 AU (123,300 km; 76,600 mi)	0.32	10–31	26.7	0.62
2015-02-16	2015 DD_{1}	0.00179 AU (268,000 km; 166,000 mi)	0.69	2–5	30.4	0.10
2015-02-17	2015 DQ_{224}	0.00166 AU (248,000 km; 154,000 mi)	0.65	3–9	29.3	0.30
2015-03-10	2015 ET	0.00146 AU (218,000 km; 136,000 mi)	0.57	10–32	26.7	0.32
2015-04-12	2015 GU	0.00159 AU (238,000 km; 148,000 mi)	0.62	5–11	28.4	0.29
2015-04-14	2015 HG_{182}	0.00103 AU (154,000 km; 96,000 mi)	0.40	4–11	28.9	0.86
2015-04-16	2015 GL_{13}	0.00112 AU (168,000 km; 104,000 mi)	0.44	4–9	28.8	0.48
2015-04-21	2015 HD_{1}	0.00186 AU (278,000 km; 173,000 mi)	0.72	8–19	27.4	0.15
2015-05-15	2015 JF_{1}	0.00196 AU (293,000 km; 182,000 mi)	0.76	6–13	28.1	0.81
2015-07-24	2015 OQ_{21}	0.00228 AU (341,000 km; 212,000 mi)	0.89	6–18	27.9	1.48
2015-09-22	2015 SK_{7}	0.00245 AU (367,000 km; 228,000 mi)	0.95	3–14	28.9	0.069
2015-10-14	2015 TC25	0.00143 AU (214,000 km; 133,000 mi)	0.56	3–9	29.5	0.29
2015-10-31	2015 TB145	0.00191 AU (286,000 km; 178,000 mi)	0.74	600	20.0	1.27
2015-11-05	2015 VP_{64}	0.000758 AU (113,400 km; 70,500 mi)	0.29	5–13	28.3	0.73
2015-11-06	2015 VU_{64}	0.00188 AU (281,000 km; 175,000 mi)	0.73	2–4	30.6	0.26
2015-11-15	2015 VY_{105}	0.00197 AU (295,000 km; 183,000 mi)	0.77	4–9	29.0	0.090
2015-11-20	2015 WP_{2}	0.00115 AU (172,000 km; 107,000 mi)	0.45	1–5	30.1	0.60
2015-11-22	2015 VO_{142}	0.00218 AU (326,000 km; 203,000 mi)	0.85	3–11	29.0	1.02
2015-12-13	2015 YJ	0.000970 AU (145,100 km; 90,200 mi)	0.38	5–18	28.2	0.19
2015-12-14	2015 XR_{169}	0.00180 AU (269,000 km; 167,000 mi)	0.70	4–12	28.7	1.32
2015-12-21	2015 YQ_{1}	0.00165 AU (247,000 km; 153,000 mi)	0.64	5–17	28.0	1.45

== See also ==
- List of asteroid close approaches to Earth
- List of asteroid close approaches to Earth in 2014
- List of asteroid close approaches to Earth in 2016
