= List of asteroid close approaches to Earth in 2014 =

- Asteroids which came closer to Earth than the Moon in 2014 by time of discovery
- After closest approach: 18 (58.1%)
- < 24 hours before: 4 (12.9%)
- up to 7 days before: 8 (25.8%)
- > one week before: 1 (3.2%)
- > 7 weeks before: 0 (0.0%)
- > one year before: 0 (0.0%)
Other years

Below is the list of asteroid close approaches to Earth in 2014.

== Timeline of known close approaches less than one lunar distance from Earth in 2014 ==
A list of known near-Earth asteroid close approaches less than 1 lunar distance (384,400 km or 0.00257 AU) from Earth in 2014, based on the close approach database of the Center for Near-Earth Object Studies (CNEOS).

The CNEOS database of close approaches lists some close approaches a full orbit or more before the discovery of the object, derived by orbit calculation. The list below only includes close approaches that are evidenced by observations, thus the pre-discovery close approaches would only be included if the object was found by precovery, but there was no such close approach in 2014.

For reference, the radius of Earth is approximately 0.0000426 AU (6,370 km; 3,960 mi) or 0.0166 Lunar distances.
The orbit of geosynchronous satellites, however, is 0.000282 AU (42,200 km; 26,200 mi) or 0.110 Lunar distances. This year, 3 asteroids were detected which traveled nearer than this, most notably 2014 AA, which impacted into Earth's atmosphere and burnt up. This list and relevant databases do not consider impacts as close approaches, thus this list does not include predicted asteroid impacts or any of the other 32 objects that collided with Earth's atmosphere in 2014, none of which were discovered in advance, but were observed visually or recorded by sensors designed to detect detonation of nuclear devices.

Rows highlighted red indicate objects which were not discovered until after closest approach

Rows highlighted yellow indicate objects discovered less than 24 hours before closest approach

Rows highlighted green indicate objects discovered more than one week before closest approach

Rows highlighted turquoise indicate objects discovered more than 7 weeks before closest approach

Rows highlighted blue indicate objects discovered more than one year before closest approach
(i.e. objects successfully cataloged on a previous orbit, rather than being detected during final approach)

Date of closest approach	Date discovered	Object	Nominal geocentric distance (AU) (Note: Distance from the center of Earth to the center of the object. See the NASA/JPL Solar System Dynamics Glossary: Geocentric. Earth has a radius of approximately 6,400 km.)	Nominal geocentric distance (LD)	Size (m) (approx.)	(H) (abs. mag.)	Closer approach to Moon	Refs
2014-01-01	2014-01-02	2014 AF5	0.000643 AU (96,200 km; 59,800 mi)	0.25	4.6–10	28.8	Yes	data · 2014 AF5
2014-01-08	2014-01-10	2014 AK_{51}	0.00247 AU (370,000 km; 230,000 mi)	0.96	13–28	26.6	Yes	data · 2014 AK51
2014-01-09	2014-01-10	2014 AG_{51}	0.000877 AU (131,200 km; 81,500 mi)	0.34	2.8–6.2	29.9		data · 2014 AG51
2014-01-10	2014-01-10	2014 AW_{32}	0.00125 AU (187,000 km; 116,000 mi)	0.49	8.4–19	27.5		data · 2014 AW32
2014-02-21	2014-02-22	2014 DK_{10}	0.00174 AU (260,000 km; 162,000 mi)	0.68	7.7–17	27.7		data · 2014 DK10
2014-03-05	2014-02-28	2014 DX110	0.00233 AU (349,000 km; 217,000 mi)	0.91	19–43	25.7		data · 2014 DX110
2014-03-06	2014-03-05	2014 EF	0.00113 AU (169,000 km; 105,000 mi)	0.44	4.4–9.9	28.9		data · 2014 EF
2014-03-06	2014-03-05	2014 EC	0.000412 AU (61,600 km; 38,300 mi)	0.16	6.1–14	28.2		data · 2014 EC
2014-03-09	2014-03-11	2014 EX_{24}	0.00176 AU (263,000 km; 164,000 mi)	0.68	5.1–11	28.6	Yes	data · 2014 EX24
2014-03-30	2014-04-04	2014 GY_{44}	0.00112 AU (168,000 km; 104,000 mi)	0.44	22–49	25.4	Yes	data · 2014 GY44
2014-04-03	2014-04-04	2014 GC_{49}	0.000759 AU (113,500 km; 70,600 mi)	0.30	5.1–11	28.6		data · 2014 GC49
2014-05-03	2014-04-28	2014 HL_{129}	0.00195 AU (292,000 km; 181,000 mi)	0.76	5.8–13	28.3		data · 2014 HL129
2014-05-07	2014-05-06	2014 JR_{24}	0.000714 AU (106,800 km; 66,400 mi)	0.28	3.7–8.2	29.3		data · 2014 JR24
2014-05-10	2014-05-10	2014 JG_{55}	0.000676 AU (101,100 km; 62,800 mi)	0.26	3.8–8.6	29.2		data · 2014 JG55
2014-05-26	2014-05-28	2014 KW_{76}	0.00230 AU (344,000 km; 214,000 mi)	0.89	7–16	27.9		data · 2014 KW76
2014-05-28	2014-05-27	2014 KC_{45}	0.000590 AU (88,300 km; 54,800 mi)	0.23	3.7–8.2	29.3		data · 2014 KC45
2014-06-03	2014-06-05	2014 LN_{17}	0.00143 AU (214,000 km; 133,000 mi)	0.56	11–24	27		data · 2014 LN17
2014-06-03	2014-06-02	2014 LY21	0.000134 AU (20,000 km; 12,500 mi)	0.05	4–9	29.1	?	data · 2014 LY21
2014-06-22	2014-06-24	2014 MH_{6}	0.00165 AU (247,000 km; 153,000 mi)	0.64	10–23	27.1	Yes	data · 2014 MH6
2014-07-24	2014-07-25	2014 OP_{2}	0.00133 AU (199,000 km; 124,000 mi)	0.52	4–9	29.1		data · 2014 OP2
2014-07-25	2014-07-26	2014 OM_{207}	0.00180 AU (269,000 km; 167,000 mi)	0.70	4–9	29.1		data · 2014 OM207
2014-08-31	2014-09-01	2014 RA	0.000379 AU (56,700 km; 35,200 mi)	0.15	4.4–9.9	28.9		data · 2014 RA
2014-09-07	2014-09-01	2014 RC	0.000267 AU (39,900 km; 24,800 mi)	0.10	11–25	26.9		data · 2014 RC
2014-09-20	2014-09-20	2014 SG_{1}	0.000532 AU (79,600 km; 49,500 mi)	0.21	4–9	29.1		data · 2014 SG1
2014-10-01	2014-10-02	2014 TL	0.000655 AU (98,000 km; 60,900 mi)	0.26	7.3–16	27.8		data · 2014 TL
2014-10-19	2014-10-24	2014 UU_{56}	0.00174 AU (260,000 km; 162,000 mi)	0.68	5.1–11	28.6		data · 2014 UU56
2014-10-27	2014-10-25	2014 UF_{56}	0.00110 AU (165,000 km; 102,000 mi)	0.43	8.8–20	27.4		data · 2014 UF56
2014-11-13	2014-11-17	2014 WE_{6}	0.00147 AU (220,000 km; 137,000 mi)	0.57	2.2–4.9	30.4	Yes	data · 2014 WE6
2014-11-15	2014-11-17	2014 WJ_{6}	0.00223 AU (334,000 km; 207,000 mi)	0.87	10–23	27.1	Yes	data · 2014 WJ6
2014-12-07	2014-11-24	2014 WX_{202}	0.00251 AU (375,000 km; 233,000 mi)	0.98	3.2–7.1	29.6	Yes	data · 2014 WX202
2014-12-26	2014-12-27	2014 YR_{14}	0.00234 AU (350,000 km; 218,000 mi)	0.91	16–36	26.1		data · 2014 YR14

=== Warning times by size ===
This sub-section visualises the warning times of the close approaches listed in the above table, depending on the size of the asteroid. The sizes of the charts show the relative sizes of the asteroids to scale. For comparison, the approximate size of a person is also shown. This is based the absolute magnitude of each asteroid, an approximate measure of size based on brightness.

Absolute magnitude H ≥ 30 (smallest)

Silhouette of man standing and facing forward

(size of a person for comparison)

Absolute magnitude 30 > H ≥ 29

Absolute magnitude 29 > H ≥ 28

Absolute magnitude 28 > H ≥ 27

Absolute magnitude 27 > H ≥ 26

Absolute Magnitude 26 > H ≥ 25

- After closest approach: 1 (50.0%)
- < 24 hours before: 0 (0.0%)
- up to 7 days before: 1 (50.0%)
- > one week before: 0 (0.0%)
- > 7 weeks before: 0 (0.0%)
- > one year before: 0 (0.0%)

Absolute magnitude 25 > H (largest)

None

== Timeline of close approaches less than one Lunar distance from the Moon in 2014 ==
The number of asteroids listed here are significantly less than those of asteroids approaching Earth for several reasons:

- Asteroids approaching Earth not only move faster, but are brighter and are easier to detect with modern surveys due to these factors
- Asteroids approaching closer to Earth are higher priority to confirm, and only confirmed asteroids are listed with a lunocentric approach distance
- Those which make close approaches to the Moon are frequently lost in its glare, making them harder to confirm, and are more easily discovered during the new Moon, when the Moon is too close to the Sun for any asteroids to be detected while they are near to the Moon anyway.

These factors combined severely limit the amount of Moon-approaching asteroids, to a level many times lower than the detected asteroids to pass just as close to Earth instead.

Date of closest approach	Object	Nominal lunocentric distance (AU) (Note: Distance from the center of the Moon to the center of the object. the Moon has a radius of approximately 1,740 km.)	Nominal lunocentric distance (LD)	Size (m) (approximate)	(H)	approach distance to Earth (LD)
2014-01-01	2014 AF5	0.000625 AU (93,500 km; 58,100 mi)	0.24	4–12	28.8	0.25
2014-01-02	2014 AA	0.00238 AU (356,000 km; 221,000 mi)	0.93 (Note: if 2014 AA had not hit Earth, it would have traveled much closer to the Moon)	1–5	30.9	impact
2014-01-07	2014 AK_{51}	0.00142 AU (212,000 km; 132,000 mi)	0.55	10–33	26.6	0.96
2014-01-08	2014 AD_{16}	0.00244 AU (365,000 km; 227,000 mi)	0.95	7–23	27.4	1.50
2014-01-09	2014 AG_{51}	0.00238 AU (356,000 km; 221,000 mi)	0.93	2–7	29.9	0.34
2014-01-10	2014 AW_{32}	0.00218 AU (326,000 km; 203,000 mi)	0.85	7–22	27.5	0.48
2014-03-05	2014 DX110	0.00250 AU (374,000 km; 232,000 mi)	0.97	15–49	25.7	0.91
2014-03-06	2014 EC	0.00257 AU (384,000 km; 239,000 mi)	0.9992	5–16	28.2	0.16
2014-03-09	2014 EX_{24}	0.00164 AU (245,000 km; 152,000 mi)	0.64	4–13	28.6	0.68
2014-03-17	2014 FE	0.00232 AU (347,000 km; 216,000 mi)	0.90	7–24	27.3	1.10
2014-03-29	2014 GY_{44}	0.000250 AU (37,400 km; 23,200 mi)	0.097	18–57	25.4	0.43
2014-05-10	2014 JG_{55}	0.00216 AU (323,000 km; 201,000 mi)	0.84	3–10	29.2	0.26
2014-05-28	2014 KC_{45}	0.00171 AU (256,000 km; 159,000 mi)	0.67	3–9	29.3	0.23
2014-06-03	2014 LN_{17}	0.00201 AU (301,000 km; 187,000 mi)	0.78	8–27	27.0	0.54
2014-06-04	2014 LY_{21}	0.00108 AU (162,000 km; 100,000 mi)	0.42	3–10	29.1	0.043
2014-06-22	2014 MH_{6}	0.000956 AU (143,000 km; 88,900 mi)	0.37	8–26	27.1	0.64
2014-08-31	2014 RA	0.00203 AU (304,000 km; 189,000 mi)	0.79	4–11	28.9	0.15
2014-09-07	2014 RC	0.000845 AU (126,400 km; 78,500 mi)	0.33	9–30	26.8	0.10
2014-09-20	2014 SG_{1}	0.00205 AU (307,000 km; 191,000 mi)	0.80	3–10	29.1	0.21
2014-10-01	2014 TL	0.00191 AU (286,000 km; 178,000 mi)	0.74	6–19	27.8	0.26
2014-10-27	2014 UF_{56}	0.00137 AU (205,000 km; 127,000 mi)	0.53	7–23	27.4	0.43
2014-11-13	2014 WE_{6}	0.00122 AU (183,000 km; 113,000 mi)	0.48	2–6	30.4	0.57
2014-11-15	2014 WJ_{6}	0.00181 AU (271,000 km; 168,000 mi)	0.70	8–26	27.1	0.86
2014-12-04	2014 WX_{202}	0.00148 AU (221,000 km; 138,000 mi)	0.58	3–8	29.6	0.98

== Additional examples ==
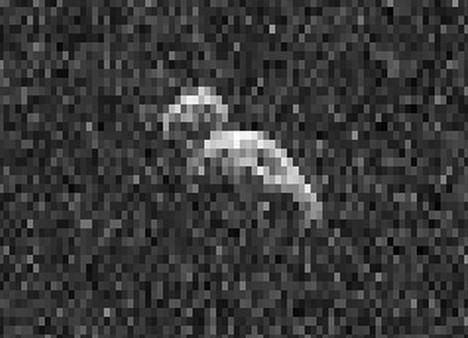
Radar-imaging of 2006 DP14, which passed by Earth in early February 2014 at a distance of 6.25 LD

An example list of near-Earth asteroids that passed more than 1 lunar distance (384,400 km or 0.00256 AU) from Earth in 2014.

- (388188) 2006 DP14 (~300 meters in diameter) passed 6.2 lunar distances from Earth on 10 February 2014.
- 2000 EM26 (~200 meters in diameter) passed more than 0.018 AU (2,700,000 km; 1,700,000 mi) from Earth on 17–18 February 2014.
- 2014 HJ_{197} (~3 meters in diameter) may have passed as close as 0.97 lunar distances (371,000 km) from Earth (0.68 lunar distances (261,000 km) from the Moon on either April 14 or 15th, 2014, but the nominal orbit calculates an approach of 1.29 lunar distances (495,000 km) from Earth (1.23 lunar distances (473,000 km) from the Moon).
- 2014 KH_{39} (~25 meters in diameter) passed 1.1 lunar distances from Earth on 3 June 2014.
- 2014 HQ124 (~325 meters in diameter) passed 3.25 lunar distances from Earth on 8 June 2014.
- 2014 OO6 (~75 meters in diameter) passed 0.0297 AU (4,440,000 km; 2,760,000 mi) from Earth on 18 August 2014.
- 2014 XL7 (~230 meters in diameter) passed roughly 0.26 AU (39,000,000 km; 24,000,000 mi) from Earth on 1 September 2014.
- The orbit of 2009 RR (20–45 meters in diameter) with an observation arc of only 4 days predicted that it could pass just inside 1 lunar distance on 2014-09-16, but the orbital uncertainties show that it could have passed as much as 0.1 AU (15,000,000 km; 9,300,000 mi) from Earth.
- 2014 SN_{142} (~10 meters in diameter) passed 1.1 lunar distances from Earth on 23 September 2014.
- 2014 SC324 (~60 meters in diameter) passed 1.5 lunar distances from Earth on 24 October 2014.

== See also ==
- List of asteroid close approaches to Earth
- List of asteroid close approaches to Earth in 2013
- List of asteroid close approaches to Earth in 2015
