= 2000 EM26 =

Small near-Earth asteroid

2000 EM_{26}
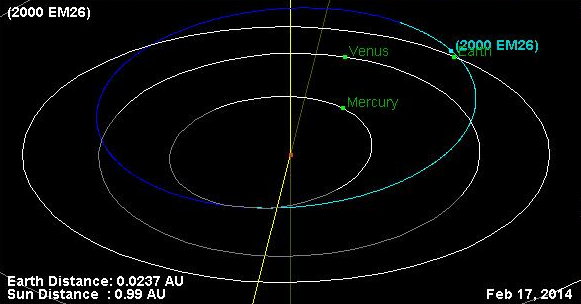
- Orbital diagram of 2000 EM_{26}

Discovery
- Discovered by: LINEAR
- Discovery site: Lincoln Laboratory's ETS
- Discovery date: 5 March 2000 (first observation only)

Designations
- Minor planet category: NEO · Aten · PHA

Orbital characteristics
- Epoch 21 November 2025 (JD 2461000.5)
- Uncertainty parameter 1 · 3
- Observation arc: 20.15 yr (7,358 d)
- Aphelion: 1.1987 AU
- Perihelion: 0.4358 AU
- Semi-major axis: 0.8172 AU
- Eccentricity: 0.4667
- Orbital period (sidereal): 270 days
- Average orbital speed: 12.37 km/s
- Mean anomaly: 60.561°
- Mean motion: 1° 20^{m} 2.76^{s} / day
- Inclination: 3.8362°
- Longitude of ascending node: 344.91°
- Argument of perihelion: 24.419°
- Earth MOID: 0.0185 AU (7.2 LD)

Physical characteristics
- Mean diameter: 110 m (est. at 0.14)
- Absolute magnitude (H): 22.5

2000 EM_{26} is a sub-kilometer near-Earth object and potentially hazardous asteroid of the Aten group, approximately 110 meters (360 feet) in diameter. It was first observed by astronomers of the LINEAR program on 5 March 2000 and followed until 14 March 2000, by which time it had dimmed to apparent magnitude 20 and was 40° from the Moon. By 17 March 2000 it was only 4 degrees from a 90% waxing gibbous moon. It has never been listed on the Sentry Risk Table because none of the potential orbital solutions create a risk of impact in the next ~100 years. The asteroid safely passed Earth on 17–18 February 2014. Due to a then-poorly determined orbit, the asteroid may have been significantly further from Earth and dozens of degrees from where the telescope was pointed during the 2014 approach.

== Observations ==
The 2014 approach was broadcast live (YouTube archive) on the Internet at 09:00 pm EST (02:00 UTC), 18 February 2014, by the Slooh community observatory. Slooh's observatory on Mount Teide in Spain's Canary Islands was iced over at the time, so images from the Slooh observatory in Dubai were used to attempt detection of the asteroid. At the time of the broadcast, no obvious image of the asteroid could be seen. Some viewers complained by Twitter that it was boring when the object was never shown in the images, while others said that "boring" was a good outcome for a pass-by.

== Orbit ==
2000 EM_{26} is an Aten-family asteroid, and as such is often near the glare of the Sun as the asteroid seldom travels outside Earth's orbit when the Earth is nearby. The orbit was poorly constrained in 2014 since the asteroid had an observation arc of only 9 days creating an orbital uncertainty of 7. Since the asteroid had not been observed since 14 March 2000, the uncertainty region had kept increasing. During the 2014 approach, 17 February 2014 was the first day that the nominal orbit had a solar elongation more than 90 degrees from the Sun making it easier to recover under a dark sky. Using the nominal orbit, the asteroid was expected to have an apparent magnitude of about 16 and pass 0.02 AU (3,000,000 km; 1,900,000 mi) from Earth. Closest approach (perigee-geocentrical) was around 00:15 UTC on 18 February plus or minus about 13 hours. Even with an observation arc of 9 days, it was known that the minimum possible close approach distance to Earth on 18 February 2014 was 0.018 AU (2,700,000 km; 1,700,000 mi) with a small chance that the asteroid would pass as far as 0.13 AU (19,000,000 km; 12,000,000 mi) from Earth. Due to the uncertainty region of the asteroid, the asteroid could have been 75 degrees from the nominal position in the sky on 18 February 2014.

2000 EM_{26} was recovered on 24 February 2017 at magnitude 21, extending the observation arc to 17 years. It is now known that 2000 EM_{26} passed 0.03665 AU (5,483,000 km; 3,407,000 mi) from Earth on 17 February 2014. In 2020 it was again observed from 22 March till 27 April. Next well observable opposition will be in March/April 2026.

== Physical characteristics ==
With an absolute magnitude of 22.5, the asteroid's diameter is estimated around 80–190 meters (260–620 feet) in diameter, for a range in albedo of 0.27 to 0.05 depending on whether the object is of stony or carbonaceous composition. For a standard albedo of 0.14, it translates to a mean diameter of 110 meters.

== See also ==
- List of asteroid close approaches to Earth in 2014
- List of asteroid close approaches to Earth
- 2009 RR
