= 2014 HQ124 =

Sub-kilometer asteroid

2014 HQ_{124}
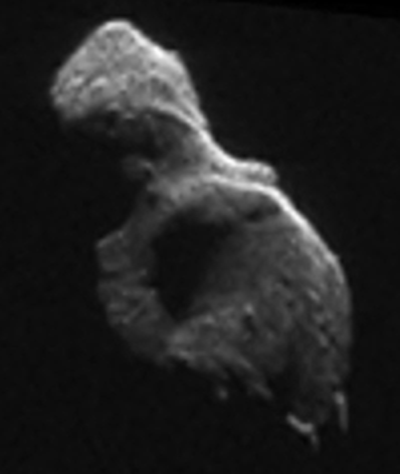
- Radar image of 2014 HQ_{124} taken by the Arecibo Observatory on 8 June 2014

Discovery
- Discovered by: NEOWISE (C51)
- Discovery date: 23 April 2014

Designations
- Minor planet category: NEO · Aten · PHA

Orbital characteristics
- Epoch 31 May 2020 (JD 2459000.5)
- Uncertainty parameter 1
- Observation arc: 4.09 yr (1,495 d)
- Aphelion: 1.0712 AU
- Perihelion: 0.6303 AU
- Semi-major axis: 0.8508 AU
- Eccentricity: 0.2591
- Orbital period (sidereal): 287 days
- Mean anomaly: 97.870°
- Mean motion: 1° 15^{m} 21.6^{s} / day
- Inclination: 26.371°
- Longitude of ascending node: 257.56°
- Argument of perihelion: 144.51°
- Earth MOID: 0.0084 AU (3.27 LD)

Physical characteristics
- Mean diameter: 0.409±0.168 km
- Synodic rotation period: >16 h
- Geometric albedo: 0.291±0.216
- Spectral type: S (assumed)
- Absolute magnitude (H): 18.9

2014 HQ_{124} is a sub-kilometer asteroid, classified as a near-Earth object and potentially hazardous asteroid of the Aten group, approximately 400 meters (1,300 feet) in diameter. It passed 3.25 lunar distances (LD) from Earth on 8 June 2014. It was discovered on 23 April 2014 by NEOWISE. It is estimated that an impact event would have had the energy equivalent of 2,000 megatons of TNT and would have created a 5 km (3 mi) impact crater. The news media misleadingly nicknamed it The Beast. 2014 HQ_{124} previously passed this close to Earth in 1952 and will not again until at least 2307. Radar imaging suggests it may be a contact binary.

== Orbit ==
2014 HQ_{124} orbits the Sun at a distance of 0.6–1.1 AU once every 0 years and 9 months (287 days; semi-major axis of 0.85 AU). Its orbit has an eccentricity of 0.26 and an inclination of 26° with respect to the ecliptic.

=== 2014 close approach ===
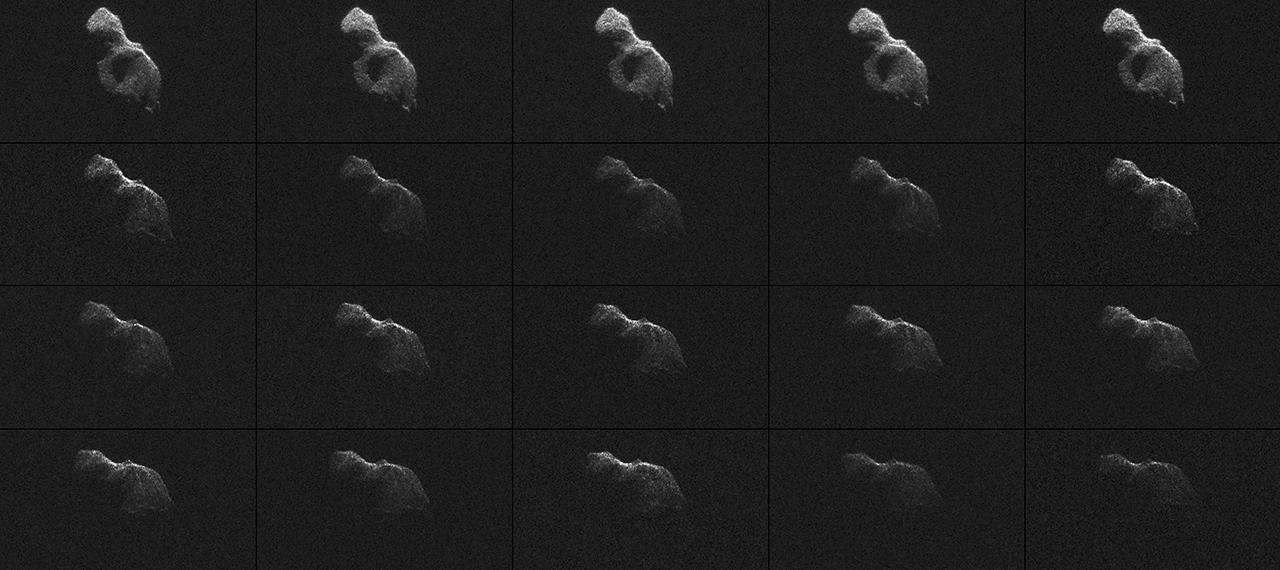
2014 HQ_{124} radar images in June 2014

On 6 June 2014, the asteroid brightened to about apparent magnitude 13.7 while in the southern constellation of Horologium. Near its closest approach to Earth of 3.25 lunar distances on 8 June 2014, the asteroid crossed the celestial equator, making it a Northern Hemisphere object. It however had an elongation of about 20 degrees from the Sun, and was lost in astronomical twilight during the closest approach to Earth. The Goldstone Deep Space Network observed the asteroid later on 8 June 2014, when the asteroid was between 3.6 and 3.8 lunar distances.

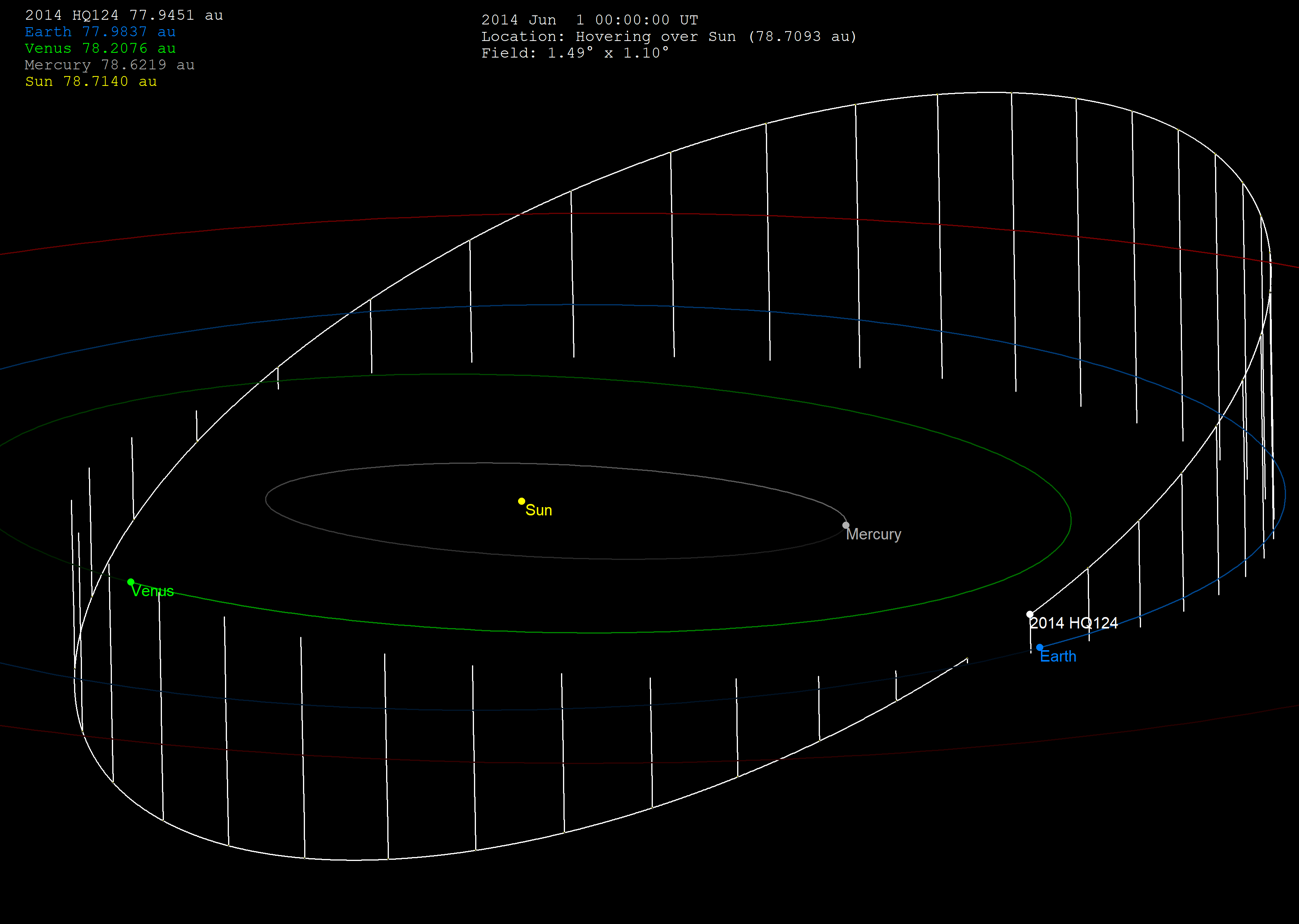
2014 HQ_{124} orbit showing high inclination and 2014 Earth flyby

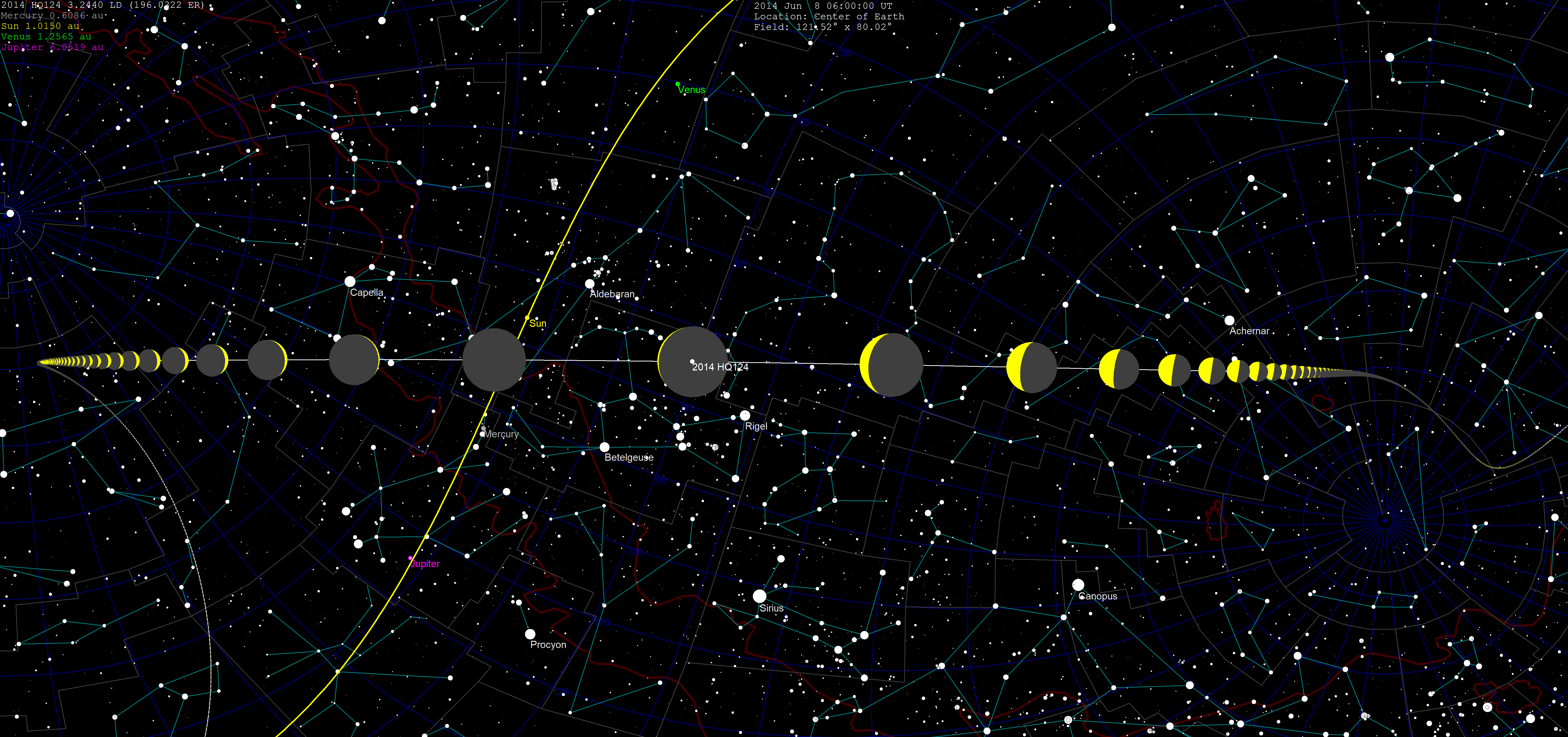
The sky trajectory of 2014 HQ_{124}, as seen from earth, with 12-hour motion markers

== Physical characteristics ==
According to the survey carried out by the NEOWISE mission of NASA's Wide-field Infrared Survey Explorer, 2014 HQ_{124} measures (0.409±0.168) kilometers in diameter and its surface has an albedo of (0.291±0.216) based on an absolute magnitude of 18.9.

Radar observations at Goldstone suggest that the object is elongated and irregular in shape, with its long axis measuring at least 370 meters (1,200 feet). Lance Benner suspects it to be a contact binary, composed of two merged objects forming a single asteroid with a lobed shape.

Photometric observations by astronomers with the Mission Accessible Near-Earth Objects Survey (MANOS) and subsequent evaluation by Brian Warner's Collaborative Asteroid Lightcurve Link, determined that 2014 HQ_{124} has a rotation period of at least 16 hours. While the object's spectral type is unknown, Warner assumes it to be an S-type asteroid, based on its high albedo, which is typical for stony asteroids.

== Related objects ==
On average, an object about the size of 2014 HQ_{124} will pass this close to Earth every few years. Similar events, where other 100+ meter diameter asteroids have or will soon pass less than 4 LD from Earth, include:

- 4179 Toutatis (~3000 meters in diameter) passed 4.0 LD from Earth on 29 September 2004
- (612901) 2004 XP14 (~500 meters in diameter) passed 1.1 LD from Earth on 3 July 2006
- (308635) 2005 YU55 (~360 meters in diameter) passed 0.8 LD from Earth on 8 November 2011
- 2014 EG_{45} (~140 meters in diameter) passed 3.2 LD from Earth on 4 March 2014
- (357439) 2004 BL86 (~600 meters in diameter) passed 3.1 LD from Earth on 26 January 2015

== See also ==
- List of asteroid close approaches to Earth in 2014
