= XL7 =

XL7 or XL-7 may refer to:

== Vehicles ==
- Hino XL7, a 2019–present Japanese-American conventional cab truck
- Suzuki XL-7, a 1998–2009 Japanese mid-size SUV
- Suzuki XL7, a 2020–present Japanese multi-purpose vehicle

== Other uses ==
- 2014 XL7, an asteroid
