= (672457) 2014 UR116 =

Eccentric sub-kilometer asteroid

(672457) 2014 UR_{116}
Discovery
- Discovered by: Mount Lemmon Srvy.
- Discovery site: Mount Lemmon Obs.
- Discovery date: 1 December 2008

Designations
- Alternative designations: 2008 XB
- Minor planet category: Apollo · NEO · PHA

Orbital characteristics
- Epoch 4 September 2017 (JD 2458000.5)
- Uncertainty parameter 0
- Observation arc: 8.23 yr (3,005 days)
- Aphelion: 3.5757 AU
- Perihelion: 0.5648 AU
- Semi-major axis: 2.0703 AU
- Eccentricity: 0.7272
- Orbital period (sidereal): 2.98 yr (1,088 days)
- Mean anomaly: 2.0212°
- Mean motion: 0° 19^{m} 51.24^{s} / day
- Inclination: 6.5740°
- Longitude of ascending node: 6.0028°
- Argument of perihelion: 286.79°
- Earth MOID: 0.0290 AU · 11.3 LD

Physical characteristics
- Dimensions: 0.4 km
- Absolute magnitude (H): 19.7

(672457) 2014 UR_{116}, also known as 2008 XB, is an eccentric sub-kilometer asteroid, categorized as a near-Earth object and potentially hazardous asteroid of the Apollo group with a diameter of approximately 400 meters (1,300 ft). It was first observed on 1 December 2008, by the Mount Lemmon Survey at Mount Lemmon Observatory in Arizona, United States.

== Orbit ==
2014 UR_{116} orbits the Sun at a distance of 0.6–3.6 AU once every 3 years (1,088 days). Its orbit has an eccentricity of 0.73 and an inclination of 7° with respect to the ecliptic.

=== Close approaches ===
The asteroid has an Earth minimum orbital intersection distance of 0.0290 AU (4,340,000 km) which translates into 11.3 lunar distances. On 21 October 2014, it passed 0.0854 AU (12,780,000 km; 7,940,000 mi) from Earth. On 10 April 2047, the asteroid will safely pass 0.0296 AU (4,430,000 km; 2,750,000 mi) from Earth.

Although some inaccurate press reports have suggested that it may pose an impact risk to Earth, the NASA/JPL Near Earth Object Program Office reported that it poses no risk of impact to any planet for at least 150 years. Between 1904 and 2174, the closest approach it makes to any planet was on 9 June 2008 when it passed 0.0144 AU (2,150,000 km; 1,340,000 mi) from Mars. The asteroid has never been listed on the Sentry Risk Table and has a well determined orbit with an observation arc of 6 years.

== Discovery ==
The asteroid was first detected on 1 December 2008 by the Mount Lemmon Survey and received the provisional designation 2008 XB. However, at an apparent magnitude of 20 and an assumed orbital eccentricity of 0.3, the object had a very short observation arc of less than 2 hours and the body became a lost minor planet. It was only recovered as 2014 UR_{116} on 27 October 2014, by observers at the MASTER-II Observatory (C41) at Pulkovo Observatory in Kislovodsk, Russia.

== See also ==
- 2014 OO6, one of the most dangerous asteroids discovered in 2014 that is on the Sentry Risk Table
