= 2014 AF5 =

Near-Earth asteroid

2014 AF_{5}
Discovery
- Discovered by: Catalina Sky Survey (703)
- Discovery date: 2 January 2014

Designations
- Minor planet category: Apollo; NEO

Orbital characteristics
- Epoch 13 January 2016 (JD 2457400.5)
- Uncertainty parameter 7
- Aphelion: 2.3810 AU (356.19 Gm) (Q)
- Perihelion: 0.75353 AU (112.726 Gm) (q)
- Semi-major axis: 1.5672 AU (234.45 Gm) (a)
- Eccentricity: 0.51920 (e)
- Orbital period (sidereal): 1.96 yr (716.64 d)
- Mean anomaly: 35.862° (M)
- Mean motion: 0° 30^{m} 8.424^{s} / day (n)
- Inclination: 6.4141° (i)
- Longitude of ascending node: 100.66° (Ω)
- Argument of perihelion: 288.71° (ω)
- Earth MOID: 0.000570632 AU (85,365.3 km)
- Jupiter MOID: 3.08041 AU (460.823 Gm)

Physical characteristics
- Dimensions: ~7 meters (23 ft); 5–10 meters
- Mass: 5×10^{5} kg (assumed)
- Absolute magnitude (H): 28.8

2014 AF_{5} is an Apollo near-Earth asteroid roughly 5–10 meters in diameter that passed less than 1 lunar distance from Earth on 1 January 2014.

== Description ==
From mid November 2013 until 1 January 2014 15:00 UT the small dim asteroid had an elongation less than 45 degrees from the Sun with an undetectable apparent magnitude of around 30. While less than 18 degrees from the Sun any dim asteroid can be lost in astronomical twilight. On 1 January 2014 10:00 UT the asteroid passed 0.00062 AU (93,000 km; 58,000 mi) from the Moon and at 16:13 UT passed 0.00064 AU (96,000 km; 59,000 mi) from Earth. The asteroid was then discovered on 2 January 2014 by the Catalina Sky Survey at an apparent magnitude of 18.9 using a 0.68-meter (27 in) Schmidt–Cassegrain telescope. By 3 January 2014 the asteroid was becoming dimmer than apparent magnitude 20.

== See also ==
- List of asteroid close approaches to Earth in 2014
