= 2015 XY261 =

Asteroid

2015 XY_{261}
Discovery
- Discovered by: Pan-STARRS 1 (first observered)
- Discovery site: Haleakala Obs.
- Discovery date: 6 December 2015

Designations
- Minor planet category: Apollo · NEO

Orbital characteristics
- Epoch 23 March 2018 (JD 2458200.5)
- Uncertainty parameter 5
- Observation arc: 0.025 yr (9 days)
- Aphelion: 2.1890 AU
- Perihelion: 0.8003177 AU
- Semi-major axis: 1.4945093 AU
- Eccentricity: 0.4644947
- Orbital period (sidereal): 1.83 yr (667 days)
- Mean anomaly: 62.24896°
- Mean motion: 0° 32^{m} 22.041^{s} / day
- Inclination: 1.59013°
- Longitude of ascending node: 86.91527°
- Argument of perihelion: 61.94406°
- Earth MOID: 0.00184 AU (0.72 LD)

Physical characteristics
- Dimensions: 9.7–22 meters
- Absolute magnitude (H): 27.2

2015 XY_{261} is an Apollo near-Earth asteroid that is also a Mars crosser. It is roughly 10–22 meters in diameter and passed less than 1 lunar distance, 0.0025696 AU (384,410 km; 238,860 mi) from Earth on 15 December 2015.

== 2015 flyby ==
This small dim asteroid approached Earth in opposition, having an elongation from the Sun of over 160 degrees from mid November 2015. However, due to its absolute magnitude even though it had a very low phase angle during the approach it was too dim for contemporary telescopes to spot it so early, as it was significantly fainter than apparent magnitude 23. However it got brighter as it approached and a few weeks later, on 6 December 2015 it was spotted by Pan-STARRS at an apparent magnitude of 21.5 using a 1.8-meter (71 in) Ritchey–Chrétien telescope.

On 15 December 2015 at 13:52 UT, the asteroid passed 0.0019277 AU (288,380 km; 179,190 mi) from the Earth and three and a half hours later at 17:17 UT passed 0.00354 AU (530,000 km; 329,000 mi) from the Moon.

This flyby is notable because the discovery was 9 days prior to closest approach. This is one of the earliest discoveries of an asteroid during approach. Discounting cataloged objects which were discovered during previous orbits, most asteroids are discovered with little or no warning. 2015 XY_{261} was the only asteroid to pass within 1 LD of Earth in 2015 that was discovered more than a week before closest approach. See List of asteroid close approaches to Earth in 2015.
