= 2014 RC =

Asteroid

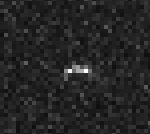
- 2014 RC imaged by the Goldstone Radar on 7 September 2014

Discovery
- Discovered by: CSS
- Discovery site: Catalina Stn.
- Discovery date: 1 September 2014 (first observed only)

Designations
- Minor planet category: NEO · Apollo

Orbital characteristics
- Epoch 1 July 2021 (JD 2459396.5)
- Uncertainty parameter 3
- Observation arc: 18 days w/Radar
- Aphelion: 1.8064 AU
- Perihelion: 0.8211 AU
- Semi-major axis: 1.3138 AU
- Eccentricity: 0.3750
- Orbital period (sidereal): 1.51 yr (550 d)
- Mean anomaly: 155.44°
- Mean motion: 0° 39^{m} 16.2^{s} / day
- Inclination: 4.5687°
- Longitude of ascending node: 344.91°
- Argument of perihelion: 71.090°
- Earth MOID: 0.0003 AU (0.1169 LD)

Physical characteristics
- Dimensions: >22 m (largest axis)
- Mean diameter: ~12–25 m (est.)
- Synodic rotation period: 0.004389 h (15.80 s)
- Spectral type: S/q
- Apparent magnitude: 28 (Nov/Dec 2014)
- Absolute magnitude (H): 26.8

2014 RC is a sub-kilometer near-Earth object and Apollo asteroid. The exceptionally fast rotator passed within 0.000267 AU (39,900 km; 24,800 mi) (0.1 lunar distances) of Earth on 7 September 2014. The asteroid is approximately the diameter of the Chelyabinsk meteor, and passed almost as close to Earth as 367943 Duende (2012 DA_{14}) did in 2013.

With an absolute magnitude of 26.8, the asteroid is about 11–25 meters (36–82 ft) in diameter depending on the albedo. Observations by the NASA Infrared Telescope Facility conclude the asteroid is a fairly bright Sq-class asteroid which have an average albedo of around 0.24, and would give the asteroid a spherical equivalent diameter of 12 meters (39 ft). Measurements by multiple telescopes indicate that the asteroid rotates in 15.8 seconds making it one of the fastest rotating asteroids so far discovered. Using the 15.8 second rotation period, more accurate radar observations by Goldstone shows the asteroid has a largest axis of at least 22 meters (72 ft). Due to the asteroid's fast rotation, it is a monolith and not a rubble pile.

On 8 September 2115 the asteroid will pass about 0.0053 AU (790,000 km; 490,000 mi) from the Moon. On 5 September 1973, the asteroid passed between 0.01052 AU (1,574,000 km; 978,000 mi) and 0.01207 AU (1,806,000 km; 1,122,000 mi) from Earth. 2014 RC was removed from the JPL Sentry Risk Table on 5 September 2014 and there are no known possible impact dates in the next 100 years.

== 2014 approach ==
It made a close approach to Earth of 0.000267 AU (39,900 km; 24,800 mi) (0.1 LD) around 18:02 UTC on 7 September 2014. The asteroid briefly brightened to about apparent magnitude 11.5, but it was still not visible to the naked eye or common binoculars. At the peak brightness the asteroid had a declination of –47, and was most easily visible over New Zealand. During 2014, asteroids 2014 AA and 2014 LY21 have come closer to Earth.

Asteroid 2014 RC

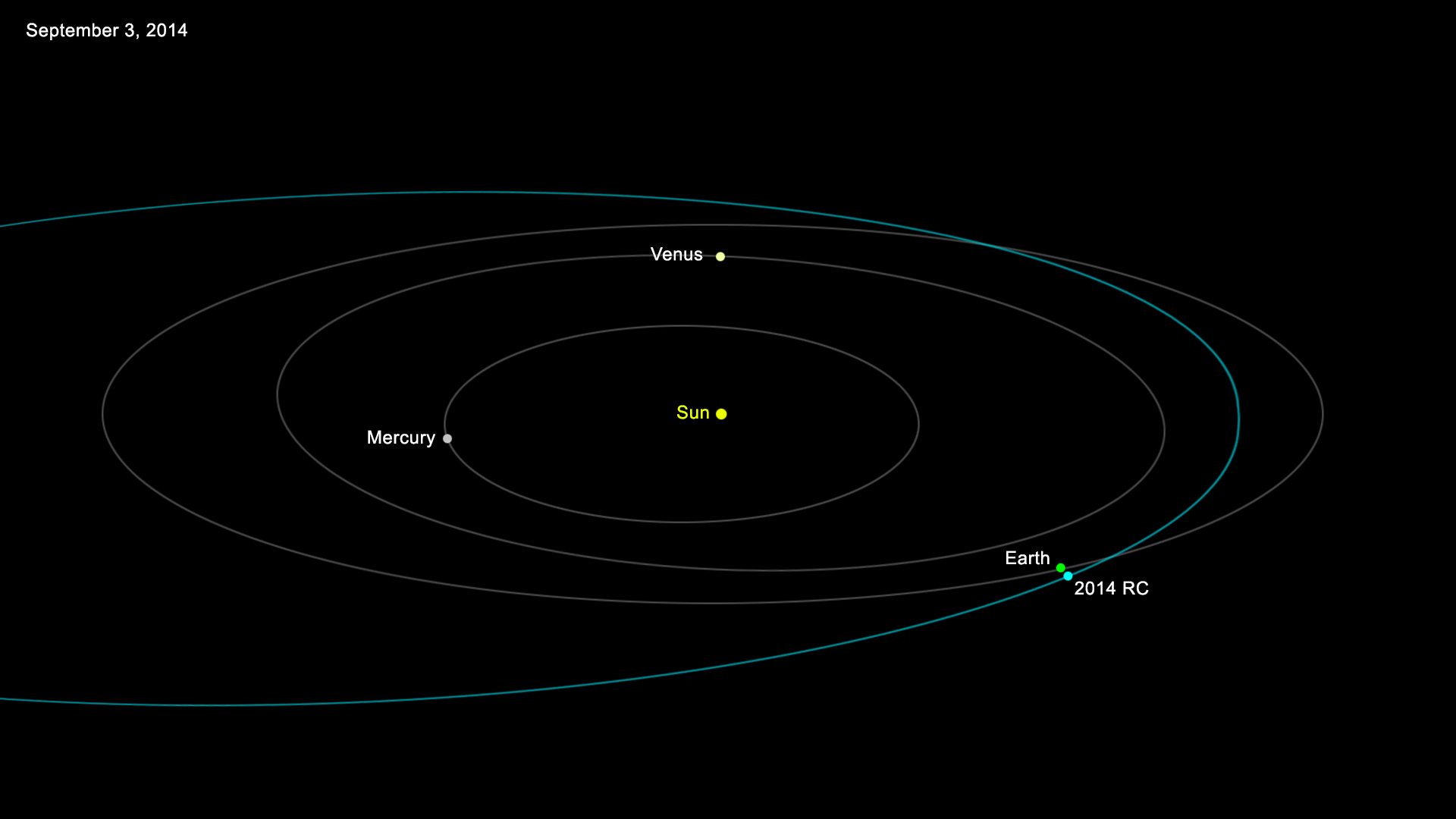
Path around the Sun – 3 September 2014.

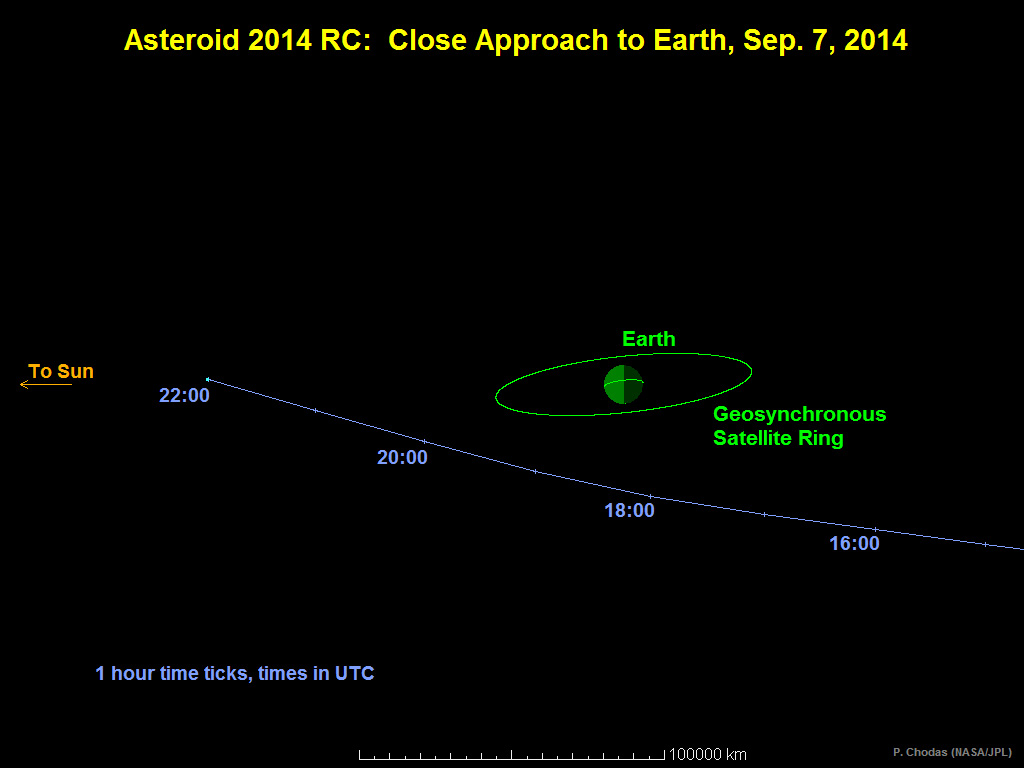
Path near the Earth – 7 September 2014.

The Managua explosion on 6 September 2014 may or may not have been created by a bolide that was missed by millions of people, but either way it was not caused by the close approach of 2014 RC.

== Orbital shift ==
During the 2014 Earth close approach the orbital period of 2014 RC was reduced from 600 days to 549 days. The orbital eccentricity decreased while the orbital inclination increased.

Parameter	Epoch	Aphelion (Q)	Perihelion (q)	Semi-major axis (a)	Eccentricity (e)	Period (p)	Inclination (i)	Longitude ascending node (Ω)	Mean anomaly (M)	Argument of perihelion (ω)
Units		AU				(days)	(°)			
Pre-flyby	2014-09-01	1.9488	0.8344	1.3916	0.4004	599.62	1.4395°	345.48°	326.12°	65.879°
flyby	2014-09-07 18:02 UTC	2.0284	0.8150	1.4217	0.4267	619.17	1.4217°	345.09°	330.91°	68.602°
Post-flyby	2014-10-01	1.8042	0.8207	1.3124	0.3747	549.18	4.5744°	345.01°	340.41°	71.187°

== Close-approach table ==
Object	Date (UTC)	Date error (hours)	Nominal distance (AU)	Nominal distance (LD)	Minimum distance (AU)	Minimum distance (LD)	Apparent magnitude (V)
Earth	1945-09-06 05:53	47.16	0.00442	1.72	0.00101	0.39	17.3
Moon	1945-09-06 14:33	52.48	0.00508	1.98	0.00103	0.40	–
Mars	1957-10-09 13:55	5.40	0.06371	24.78	0.05267	20.49	–
Earth	1973-09-05 21:42	0.62	0.01169	4.55	0.01089	4.24	19.3
Earth	1987-01-17 01:02	0.30	0.03724	14.49	0.03686	14.34	22.4
Earth	1991-09-27 05:38	1.03	0.09911	38.55	0.09878	38.43	27.0
Mars	1999-09-22 14:00	<0.01	0.03739	14.54	0.03712	14.44	–
Earth	2009-12-30 13:10	0.28	0.08634	33.59	0.08622	33.54	26.0
Moon	2014-09-07 08:47	<0.01	0.000845	0.329	0.000845	0.329	–
Earth	2014-09-07 18:02	<0.01	0.000267	0.104	0.000267	0.104	15.9
Earth	2017-09-11 13:50	0.15	0.03864	15.03	0.03850	14.98	23.3
Earth	2020-09-22 21:24	0.35	0.09908	38.54	0.09893	38.48	26.1
Earth	2039-01-21 23:38	0.13	0.06224	24.21	0.06215	24.18	24.0
Earth	2042-01-27 18:19	0.10	0.06322	24.59	0.06313	24.56	23.6
Earth	2109-09-01 16:27	0.07	0.09959	38.74	0.09945	38.69	24.7
Earth	2112-09-06 21:13	0.08	0.02253	8.76	0.02241	8.72	21.1
Moon	2115-09-08 19:11	0.15	0.00558	2.17	0.005350	2.08	–
Earth	2115-09-08 22:50	0.17	0.00785	3.05	0.00763	2.97	18.5
Mars	2140-10-13 22:42	2.85	0.07152	27.82	0.05471	21.28	–
Earth	2159-02-02 22:17	16.90	0.08084	31.45	0.05563	21.64	24.2
Earth	2162-01-19 14:04	38.85	0.09376	36.47	0.07273	28.29	25.2
Earth	2170-09-19 02:08	9.12	0.07413	28.84	0.06707	26.09	25.1
Earth	2173-09-04 16:52	1.38	0.06123	23.82	0.05950	23.15	23.5

== See also ==
- List of fast rotators (minor planets)
