= 2014 DX110 =

Sub-kilometer asteroid

2014 DX_{110}
Discovery
- Discovered by: Pan-STARRS (F51)
- Discovery date: 28 February 2014

Designations
- Minor planet category: Apollo; NEO

Orbital characteristics
- Epoch 13 January 2016 (JD 2457400.5)
- Uncertainty parameter 6
- Aphelion: 3.5778 AU (535.23 Gm) (Q)
- Perihelion: 0.82623 AU (123.602 Gm) (q)
- Semi-major axis: 2.2020 AU (329.41 Gm) (a)
- Eccentricity: 0.62479 (e)
- Orbital period (sidereal): 3.27 yr (1193.5 d)
- Mean anomaly: 193.14° (M)
- Mean motion: 0° 18^{m} 5.832^{s} / day (n)
- Inclination: 5.7362° (i)
- Longitude of ascending node: 163.83° (Ω)
- Argument of perihelion: 56.517° (ω)
- Earth MOID: 0.00157599 AU (235,765 km)

Physical characteristics
- Dimensions: ~23 meters (75 ft); 20–40 m (66–131 ft)
- Mass: 1.6×10^{7} kg (assumed)
- Synodic rotation period: 0.12041 h (7.225 min)
- Apparent magnitude: 15–32
- Absolute magnitude (H): 25.7

2014 DX_{110} is a sub-kilometer asteroid, classified as a near-Earth object of the Apollo group, approximately 30 meters in diameter. It passed less than 1 lunar distance from Earth on 5 March 2014. With an absolute magnitude of 25.7, this asteroid is potentially the largest asteroid to come inside the orbit of the Moon since 2013 PJ10 on 4 August 2013. The close approach was webcast live by Slooh and Virtual Telescope.

== Description ==
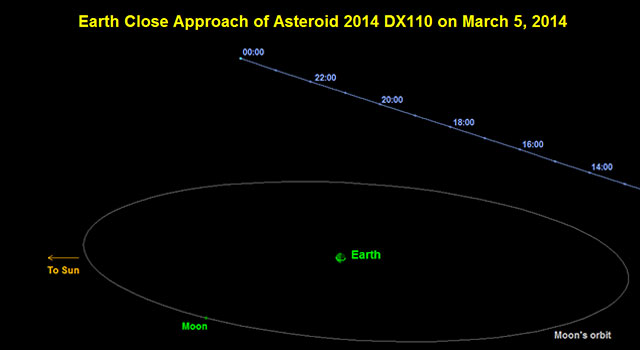
Orbital diagram: close approach of 2014 DX_{110} on 5 March 2014

2014 DX_{110} came to opposition (furthest elongation in the sky from the Sun) on 15 February 2014, but the asteroid had a very faint apparent magnitude of about 23 and was only 10 degrees from the full moon. The asteroid was discovered on 28 February 2014 by Pan-STARRS at an apparent magnitude of 20 using a 1.8-meter (71 in) Ritchey–Chrétien telescope.

On 5 March 2014 at 21:00 UT the asteroid passed 0.00232 AU (347,000 km; 216,000 mi) from Earth and reached about apparent magnitude 15. At 22:22 UT it passed 0.00249 AU (372,000 km; 231,000 mi) from the Moon. By 6 March 2014 18:00 UT, the asteroid was less than 30 degrees from the Sun and dimming significantly.

It has an observation arc of 5 days with an uncertainty parameter of 6. It was removed from the JPL Sentry Risk Table on 5 March 2014 using JPL solution 3 with an observation arc of 5 days. When the asteroid only had an observation arc of 4 days, virtual clones of the asteroid that fit the uncertainty region in the known trajectory showed a 1 in 10 million chance that the asteroid could impact Earth on 4 March 2046. With a 2046 Palermo Technical Scale of −7.11, the odds of impact by 2014 DX_{110} in 2046 were about 13 million times less than the background hazard level of Earth impacts which is defined as the average risk posed by objects of the same size or larger over the years until the date of the potential impact. Using the nominal orbit, NEODyS shows that the asteroid will be 2.8 AU (420,000,000 km; 260,000,000 mi) from Earth on 4 March 2046.
