= (523775) 2014 YB35 =

Near-Earth asteroid

(523775) 2014 YB_{35}
Discovery
- Discovered by: Catalina Sky Survey
- Discovery site: Catalina Station
- Discovery date: 27 December 2014

Designations
- Minor planet category: Apollo · NEO · PHA

Orbital characteristics
- Epoch 27 April 2019 (JD 2458600.5)
- Uncertainty parameter 1
- Observation arc: 3.72 yr (1,360 d)
- Aphelion: 2.7834 AU
- Perihelion: 0.9697 AU
- Semi-major axis: 1.8766 AU
- Eccentricity: 0.4833
- Orbital period (sidereal): 2.57 yr (939 d)
- Mean anomaly: 209.73°
- Mean motion: 0° 23^{m} 0.24^{s} / day
- Inclination: 12.641°
- Longitude of ascending node: 3.7634°
- Argument of perihelion: 188.63°
- Known satellites: 1 (D: <150 m; P: n.a.)
- Earth MOID: 0.0224 AU (8.73 LD)

Physical characteristics
- Mean diameter: 0.300 km 0.52 km
- Synodic rotation period: 3.277±0.002 h (Note: Lightcurve plot of (523775) 2014 YB35 by Robert Stephens. Rotation period 3.277±0.002 hours with a brightness amplitude of mag. Quality code is 2+. Summary figures for at the LCDB and CS3)
- Geometric albedo: 0.20 (assumed); 0.39
- Spectral type: S (assumed)
- Absolute magnitude (H): 19.0; 20.0

(523775) 2014 YB_{35} is a stony near-Earth object and potentially hazardous asteroid of the Apollo group, approximately 300 meters (980 feet) in diameter. It was discovered on 27 December 2014 by the Catalina Sky Survey at the Catalina Station in Arizona, United States. In March 2015, a minor-planet moon, less than half the size of its primary, was discovered by radar astronomers at Goldstone Observatory. The primary body of the binary system has a rotation period of 3.3 hours, while the secondary's orbital period remains unknown.

== Orbit and classification ==
2014 YB_{35} is a member of the Apollo asteroids, a group of near-Earth object with an Earth-crossing orbit. It orbits the Sun at a distance of 1.0–2.8 AU once every 2 years and 7 months (939 days; semi-major axis of 1.88 AU). Its orbit has an eccentricity of 0.48 and an inclination of 13° with respect to the ecliptic. The body's observation arc begins at with its official discovery observation at Catalina Station in December 2014.

=== Close encounters ===
It passed by Earth on 27 March 2015 at 06:21 UTC at a distance of 4,473,807 ± 155 km (2,779,895 ± 96 mi), or 11.7 lunar distances, and a relative speed of 10.16 km/s (6.31 mi/s). 2014 YB_{35}'s next encounter with Earth will be in 2033, at a distance of approximately 3,330,000 km (2,070,000 mi).

== Satellite ==
The Goldstone Deep Space Communications Complex was scheduled to observe this object on 20 March 2015, at which time it was expected they could obtain coarse radar images and continuous wave spectra, which may help determine the asteroid's composition. These observations showed a small companion less than 150 meters across orbiting the asteroid, with an unknown orbit.

== Numbering and naming ==
This minor planet was numbered by the Minor Planet Center on 25 September 2018 (M.P.C. 111778). As of 2018, it has not been named.

== See also ==
- List of asteroid close approaches to Earth in 2015
