= Managua event =

Explosive event in 2014 in Nicaragua

The Managua event was an explosion that was widely reported as a possible meteorite fall on 6 September 2014 in Managua, Nicaragua, near the Augusto C. Sandino International Airport runway. Its actual cause remains undetermined.

Witnesses in Managua reported hearing a blast and seeing a dust cloud that smelled like something had burned, on the night of 6 September. A crater 12 m (39 ft) wide and 5 m (16 ft) deep was found in the vicinity of the Nicaraguan Air Force base zone of the airport. Initial reports claimed that two seismic waves were detected associated with the event, but no such events are reported on the Nicaraguan Seismic Network (INETER) website.

The Nicaraguan Vice-Minister of the Exterior, Orlando Zamora, sent a letter on 9 September 2014 to the US Ambassador to Nicaragua, requesting the "arrangement of cooperation" with the United States Geological Survey (USGS) and inviting a "meteor expert" to visit the crater site to coordinate efforts of the scientific community investigating the event. In the letter, Mr. Zamora also stated that "seismic and acoustic waves were recorded by at least 24 seismic stations near the city of Managua."

In media press conference interviews on 7 September 2014, local geophysical scientists who visited the site described finding "tiny mirror-like particles" in the volcanic ash soil along the walls of the crater (exact coordinates = 12°08′38.96″N 086°11′03.04″W) and noted ejecta "extending off toward the east-north-east". The scientists indicated they "would need to study the site further" and were "seeking to collaborate with experts in other countries".

Although the earliest news reports made no claim of a meteor, many news sources reported speculations that a meteor had created the crater and the blast. Many of the speculations proposed an association between the Managua event and the close Earth flyby of the asteroid 2014 RC, which happened late on 7 September. Such an association is not possible: 2014 RC was about 40,000 km (25,000 mi) from Earth at its closest approach, over New Zealand; nothing on the same trajectory could have entered the Earth's atmosphere over Nicaragua; and the crater in Managua was reported 13 hours prior to 2014 RC's closest approach.

On Sunday 7 September 2014, at the first press conference of the inter-institutional commission formed to study the event, Dr. Wilfried Strauch, a German seismic scientist working at the INETER in Managua, described impulses correlated to the event timing, and referred to heliplot seismograph charts with pulses at 05:04:45 UTC (23:04:45 Local Time) at the Managua airport seismic station (MGAN BLZ NU), another at a more distant station around 05:05:47 UTC and also indicated that there were records of 18 other stations in the network that were being examined.

At the second INETER commission press conference on Tuesday 9 September 2014, the team of local scientists said that "bits of compacted unusual debris found in the bottom of the crater" were being sent off to labs for analysis, and access to the site was controlled to prevent contamination of evidence pending examination by visiting scientists specializing in this field. Some physical debris samples taken at the crater by the scientific team were sent to the National Autonomous University of Mexico (UNAM). Additionally, they announced that "USGS and NASA have been contacted regarding possible advice" on the study. One of the scientists on the commission, Dr. José Milán, said "an awning would be set up to protect the crater area from possible rain showers" and another scan of the area for unusual ejecta debris on the ground or "any material embedded in surrounding trees" was being performed. According to Dr. Milán, the research work at the site also included 3d imaging of the crater and surrounding area, Ground Penetrating Radar (GPR), and a magnetometer grid study. No results of the studies were announced.

No eyewitnesses, ground-based cameras, or satellite operators reported seeing a meteor (bolide), and no meteorites have been recovered. To create a crater of that size by meteorite impact would have required a bolide brighter than the full Moon. This indicates that the crater was most likely not produced by a meteorite fall.

Other potential explanations for the crater's formation include ground slumping, a sinkhole, excavation, or a ground-based explosive detonation - either that which caused the blast reported on the night of 6 September 2014 or one that occurred before that time.

== See also ==
- 2007 Carancas impact event
