= 2014 EC =

Near-earth object and asteroid

Discovery
- Discovered by: Catalina Sky Srvy.
- Discovery site: Mount Lemmon Obs.
- Discovery date: 5 March 2014

Designations
- Minor planet category: NEO · Apollo

Orbital characteristics
- Epoch 4 September 2017 (JD 2458000.5)
- Uncertainty parameter 6
- Observation arc: (1 day)
- Aphelion: 2.2257 AU
- Perihelion: 0.6917 AU
- Semi-major axis: 1.4587 AU
- Eccentricity: 0.5258
- Orbital period (sidereal): 1.76 yr (644 days)
- Mean anomaly: 325.66°
- Mean motion: 0° 33^{m} 33.84^{s} / day
- Inclination: 1.4023°
- Longitude of ascending node: 344.98°
- Argument of perihelion: 264.04°
- Earth MOID: 0.0005 AU · 0.2 LD

Physical characteristics
- Dimensions: 7 m (estimate at 0.20); 10 m
- Absolute magnitude (H): 28.2

2014 EC is a 10-meter sized, eccentric asteroid, classified as a near-Earth object of the Apollo group that passed within 48,000 miles (77,000 km) of Earth in early March 2014. This was six times closer to the Earth than the Moon. It was first observed on 5 March 2014, by the Catalina Sky Survey at Mount Lemmon Observatory in Arizona, United States. As of 2017, it has not since been observed.

== Description ==
2014 EC has only been observed on two nights for a period of less than 48 hours, with a remaining orbital uncertainty of 4 and 6 respectively. It orbits the Sun at a distance of 0.7–2.2 AU once every 21 months (644 days). Its orbit has an eccentricity of 0.53 and an inclination of 1° with respect to the ecliptic.

The asteroid has an Earth minimum orbital intersection distance of 0.0005 AU (74,800 km) which translates into less than 0.2 lunar distances.

Based on a generic magnitude-to diameter conversion, 2014 EC measures 7 meters in diameter, for a measured absolute magnitude of 28.2 and an assumed albedo of 0.2, which is typical value for stony S-type asteroids. Other sources estimated the body to be approximately 10 meters or 30 feet across. It is too small for being a potentially hazardous asteroid, which require an absolute magnitude of 22.0 or less.

== See also ==
- List of asteroid close approaches to Earth in 2014
