= LightBuckets =

Observatory in Hautes-Alpes, France

- Observatory code: H11 (until mid-2011); B10 (since November 2011)
- Location: Hautes-Alpes, France
- Coordinates: 31°51′39″N 109°00′56″W
- Altitude: 814.6 m (2,673 ft)
- Website: www.lightbuckets.com

Telescopes
- LB-0001: 32" Astelco f4+f8
- LB-0002: 17" Dall–Kirkham f4.56
- LB-0003: 110 mm APO (4.3") ED doublet f5.95
- LB-0004: 175 mm APO (7") TMB triplet f8
- LB-0005: 300 mm (12") ASA Newton f3.6

LightBuckets is a commercial astronomical observatory formerly located in Rodeo, New Mexico and now located in France, which rents time on its telescopes to customers around the world via a website on the Internet, including amateur and professional astronomers. It is an online astronomy platform with live-views, and hosts an image gallery of astronomy images. Recognized scientific uses include the confirmation of supernova and discovery of asteroids.

LightBuckets along with other online telescope rentals were suggested for use in the Target Asteroids! program along with Sierra Stars Observatory Network and iTelescope, as an alternative to those that access to an Internet connected computer but not a telescope of sufficient power for that program.

== Description ==
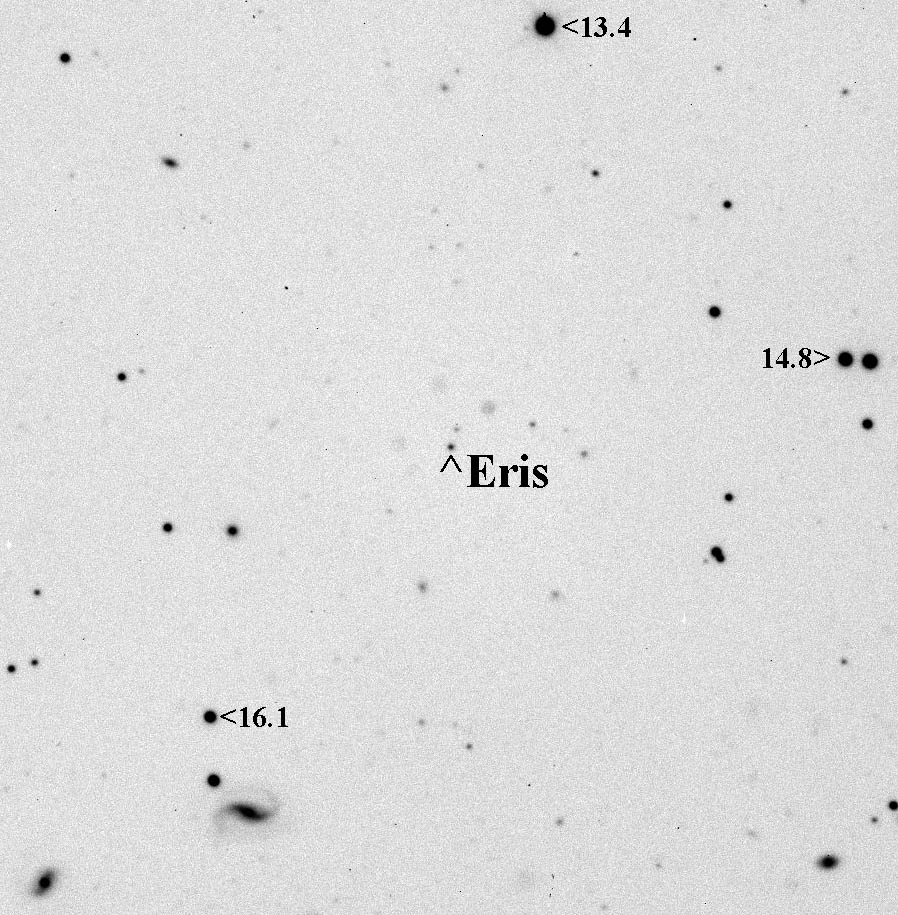
The dwarf planet Eris on a 24-inch (61 cm) aperture LightBuckets telescope

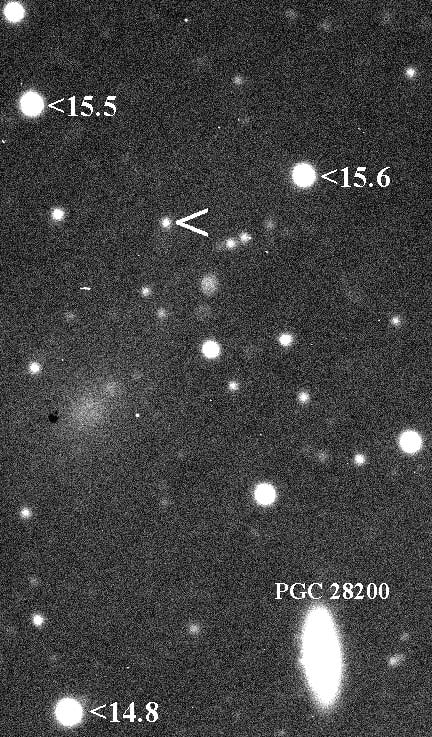
Orcus as imaged by a LightBuckets telescope

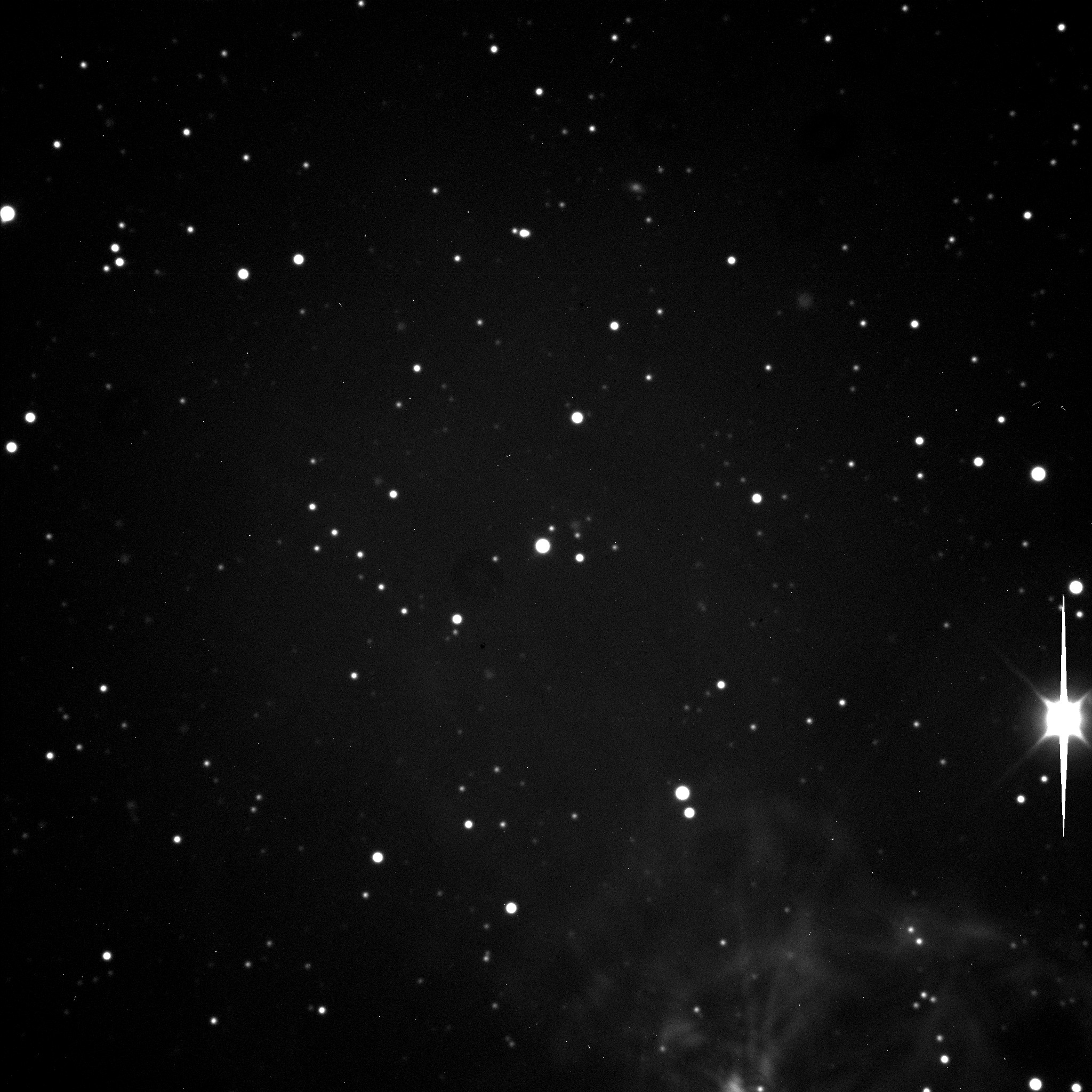
Asteroid 17 Thetis imaged, the light in center also from a LB telescope

LightBuckets was founded in 2007 by Steve Cullen, a former software executive, and the observatories became active on June 12, 2008. In 2011, he returned to the software business, and LightBuckets went through a period of change.

Time on the telescopes is sold either by a subscription or pay as you go. The cost of using one of the telescopes in its global network varies depending on the model. Compared to its contemporaries, LightBuckets allows new images of the sky to be observed, as opposed to Microsoft WorldWide Telescope or Google Sky, which use stored images. It is more similar to Slooh, which also allows live-views from telescopes located in places such as Chile and Spain.

=== 2008-2011 ===
LightBuckets went through an ownership transition in 2011, resulting in a turn-over in what instruments and sites were available. Before then, LightBuckets instruments included Ritchey-Chrétiens by RC Optical Systems including a 0.61 m (24”) f/8 designated LB-0001 and a 0.37 m (14.5") designated LB-0003 both located at the company's observatory in Rodeo, New Mexico. This site is recorded as H11 Rodeo by the Minor Planet Center. LightBuckets also offers a wide-field observatory (LB-0002) in Rodeo, NM which includes a 0.2 m (8") AstroSysteme Austria N8 Newtonian Astrograph. Other instruments are imaging cameras from Apogee Instruments including a high quantum efficiency Alta U42 (LB-0001), a large CCD Alta U16M (LB-0003), and an Alta U8300 (LB-0002). Each camera is equipped with a filter wheel containing a full complement of broadband (LRGB) and narrowband (Ha, SII, and OIII) filters. LB-0001 also offers photometric Johnson/Cousins (from Astrodon) V and Ic filters for researchers.

In 2009 LightBuckets partnered with International Year of Astronomy. They were a part of 100 Hours of Astronomy Cornerstone Project.

LightBuckets is known to have used domes made by Astro Haven Enterprises in their telescope installations.

=== Post-2011 ===
Lightbuckets is now located in France with a new 32 inch robotic telescope (LB-0001) and four other telescopes: LB-0002 a 17" planewave telescope - LB-0003 a FLT 110mm refractor - LB-0004 a TMB 175 mm refractor and LB-0005 an ASA 12" Newtonian telescope on an ASA direct-drive mount.

== Activities ==
- Puckett Observatory Supernova Search discovered supernova SN 2008gr in IC 1579 which was confirmed using LightBuckets telescopes at Rodeo, New Mexico, in 2008.
- By October 2009 LightBuckets LB-0001 in Rodeo, NM had been used to discover at least 17 new asteroids with provisional designations. LightBuckets LB-0001 was recorded as a ".68m f/8 Ritchey-Chrétien" by the Minor Planet Center at H11 Rodeo.
- In September 2010, LightBuckets LB-0001 was part of a group of instruments to confirm gamma ray burst (GRB) GRB100901A.
- On May 18, 2011, LightBuckets announced that it will be ceasing operations in Rodeo, NM in the near future. LightBuckets had imaged for over 4,300 hours, had executed more than 5,400 customer imaging runs, and had over 680 customers.
- A new telescope, LB-0006, a 0.43m (17") 0.43m (17") Dall Kirkham, in France, South Alpen appears on startsite in August 2011.

== See also ==
- Astrophotography
- Kitt Peak Advanced Observing Program
- List of astronomical observatories
- Software Bisque
- Slooh
