= 2015 AZ43 =

Apollo near-Earth asteroid

2015 AZ_{43}
Discovery
- Discovered by: Pan-STARRS (F51)
- Discovery date: 11 January 2015

Designations
- Minor planet category: Apollo; NEO

Orbital characteristics
- Epoch 13 January 2016 (JD 2457400.5)
- Uncertainty parameter 5
- Observation arc: 45 days
- Aphelion: 2.75773 AU (412.551 Gm) (Q)
- Perihelion: 0.98830226 AU (147.847914 Gm) (q)
- Semi-major axis: 1.87301 AU (280.198 Gm) (a)
- Eccentricity: 0.472347 (e)
- Orbital period (sidereal): 2.56 yr (936.29 d)
- Mean anomaly: 123.5461° (M)
- Mean motion: 0° 23^{m} 4.187^{s} / day (n)
- Inclination: 4.52198° (i)
- Longitude of ascending node: 337.42980° (Ω)
- Argument of perihelion: 181.78786° (ω)
- Earth MOID: 0.00161778 AU (242,016 km)
- Jupiter MOID: 2.23908 AU (334.962 Gm)

Physical characteristics
- Dimensions: ~70 meters; 50–120 meters
- Synodic rotation period: 0.59992 h (35.995 min)
- Absolute magnitude (H): 23.5

2015 AZ_{43} is an Apollo near-Earth asteroid roughly 70 meters in diameter. On 10 February 2015 with a 29.5-day observation arc, it showed a 1 in 5,880 chance of impacting Earth on 27 February 2107. However, the NEODyS nominal best-fit orbit shows that 2015 AZ_{43} will be 2.8 AU (420,000,000 km; 260,000,000 mi) from Earth on 27 February 2107. A (non-impacting) Earth close approach in 2056 makes future trajectories diverge. It was removed from the JPL Sentry Risk Table on 23 February 2015 using JPL solution 26 with an observation arc of 40 days that included radar data.

With an absolute magnitude of 23.5, the asteroid is about 50–120 meters in diameter.

== 2015 flyby ==
2015 AZ_{43} was discovered on 11 January 2015 by Pan-STARRS at an apparent magnitude of 20 using a 1.8-meter (71 in) Ritchey–Chrétien telescope. On 15 February 2015 the asteroid passed 0.0197 AU (2,950,000 km; 1,830,000 mi) from Earth. The Goldstone Deep Space Network detected the asteroid on 18–19 February 2015, but the signal was not strong enough for delay-Doppler imaging.
