= 2014 SC324 =

Small near-Earth asteroid

2014 SC_{324}
Discovery
- Discovered by: Mt. Lemmon Survey (G96)
- Discovery date: 30 September 2014

Designations
- Minor planet category: Apollo; NEO

Orbital characteristics
- Epoch 13 January 2016 (JD 2457400.5)
- Uncertainty parameter 1
- Observation arc: 29 days w/Radar
- Aphelion: 2.93880 AU (439.638 Gm) (Q)
- Perihelion: 0.91503 AU (136.887 Gm) (q)
- Semi-major axis: 1.92691 AU (288.262 Gm) (a)
- Eccentricity: 0.52513 (e)
- Orbital period (sidereal): 2.67 yr (976.99 d)
- Mean anomaly: 152.737° (M)
- Mean motion: 0° 22^{m} 6.521^{s} / day (n)
- Inclination: 1.65403° (i)
- Longitude of ascending node: 210.19563° (Ω)
- Argument of perihelion: 221.35334° (ω)
- Earth MOID: 0.000606726 AU (90,764.9 km)

Physical characteristics
- Dimensions: 37–85 m (generic)
- Synodic rotation period: 0.36156 h (21.694 min)
- Apparent magnitude: 24-29 (2014–2015)
- Absolute magnitude (H): 24.3

2014 SC_{324} is a sub-kilometer asteroid and fast rotator, classified as a near-Earth object of the Apollo group, approximately 50 meters in diameter. It was first observed on 30 September 2014, by the Mount Lemmon Survey at an apparent magnitude of 21 using a 1.5-meter (59 in) reflecting telescope. With an absolute magnitude of 24.3, the asteroid is about 37–85 meters in diameter.

== Description ==
The preliminary orbit with a short observation arc of two days showed that the asteroid had a very small chance of passing 0.000125 AU (18,700 km; 11,600 mi) from the Moon or 0.0012 AU (180,000 km; 110,000 mi) from Earth on about 23 October 2014. But with an observation arc of ten days, the nominal (best fit) orbit showed that on 24 October 2014 the asteroid would pass 0.0038 AU (570,000 km; 350,000 mi) (1.5 LD) from Earth and even further from the Moon. The asteroid peaked at apparent magnitude 13.5, placing it in the range of amateurs with roughly 0.25-meter (10 in) telescopes.

It was removed from the Sentry Risk Table on 10 October 2014 using JPL solution #5 with a 10-day observation arc.

It was observed by Goldstone radar on 24–25 October 2014.
