= (388188) 2006 DP14 =

Sub-kilometer sized peanut-shaped asteroid

(388188) 2006 DP_{14}
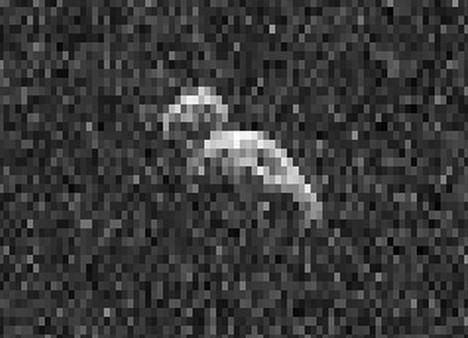
- Radar image of 2006 DP_{14} by the Arecibo Observatory in 2014

Discovery
- Discovered by: LINEAR
- Discovery site: Lincoln Lab's ETS
- Discovery date: 23 February 2006

Designations
- Minor planet category: Apollo · NEO · PHA

Orbital characteristics
- Epoch 23 March 2018 (JD 2458200.5)
- Uncertainty parameter 0
- Observation arc: 10.10 yr (3,690 d)
- Aphelion: 2.4262 AU
- Perihelion: 0.3056 AU
- Semi-major axis: 1.3659 AU
- Eccentricity: 0.7763
- Orbital period (sidereal): 1.60 yr (583 d)
- Mean anomaly: 234.28°
- Mean motion: 0° 37^{m} 2.64^{s} / day
- Inclination: 11.778°
- Longitude of ascending node: 317.20°
- Argument of perihelion: 59.280°
- Earth MOID: 0.0163 AU (6.35 LD)

Physical characteristics
- Dimensions: 400 m × 200 m
- Mean diameter: 0.4 km 0.493 km (calculated)
- Synodic rotation period: 5.77±0.01 h (Note: Lightcurve plot of (388188), obtained at the Center for Solar System Studies (U82) by B. D. Warner in February 2014); 5.78±0.02 h 6 h
- Geometric albedo: 0.20 (assumed)
- Spectral type: S (assumed); B–V = 0.670±0.022; V–R = 0.400±0.015; V–I = 0.792±0.031
- Absolute magnitude (H): 18.80±0.02; 18.9

(388188) 2006 DP_{14} is a sub-kilometer sized, peanut-shaped asteroid on a highly eccentric orbit, classified as a near-Earth object and potentially hazardous asteroid of the Apollo group. This contact binary was discovered on 23 February 2006, by astronomers of the LINEAR program at the Lincoln Laboratory's Experimental Test Site near Socorro, New Mexico, in the United States. On 10 February 2014, it passed 6.25 lunar distances from Earth. The asteroid is approximately 400 meters in diameter and has a rotation period of 5.77 hours.

== Classification and orbit ==
2006 DP_{14} is a member of the Apollo group, which are Earth-crossing asteroids and the largest group of near-Earth asteroids.

It orbits the Sun at a distance of 0.3–2.4 AU once every 19 months (583 days; semi-major axis of 1.37 AU). Its orbit has a high eccentricity of 0.78 and an inclination of 12° with respect to the ecliptic. As no precoveries were taken, the body's observation arc begins with its discovery observation in 2006.

=== Close approaches ===
The asteroid has an Earth minimum orbit intersection distance (MOID) of 2,440,000 km (0.0163 AU), which corresponds to 6.4 lunar distances (LD). On 10 February 2014, it passed Earth close to this theoretical minimum distance at 6.25 LD, or 2,400,000 km (0.016032 AU). This makes it a potentially hazardous asteroid (PHA), a body with a threatening close approach to the Earth, due to its low MOID and large size (absolute magnitude of 18.9). PHAs are defined as objects with an absolute magnitude of 22 or brighter – which generically corresponds to a diameter of approximately 140 meters – and a MOID that is smaller than 0.05 AU or 19.5 LD.

== Physical characteristics ==
2006 DP_{14} is an assumed stony S-type asteroid. This asteroid is a typical contact binary, with two distinctive lobes on either end that appear to be in contact, giving it a peanut-like shape.

=== Diameter, shape and albedo ===
On the night of 11 February 2014, NASA scientists conducted a radar imaging session using the 70-meter dish at Goldstone Observatory. These observations, using delay-Doppler radar imaging, revealed a 400×200 meters sized body, while the Collaborative Asteroid Lightcurve Link calculates a diameter of almost 500 meters, based on an assumed standard albedo for stony asteroids of 0.20 and an absolute magnitude of 18.9.

Amateur and professional astronomers helped track 2006 DP_{14} in the preceding days, so they would know just where to point the large antenna.

=== Rotation period ===
Goldstone's radiometric observations also gave a rotation period of approximately 6 hours. Photometric follow-up observations led to two light-curves that gave a refined period of 5.77 and 5.78 hours with a high brightness variation of 1.05 and 0.9, respectively (U=3/3). Its high brightness amplitude is also indicative for its elongated shape.

== Naming ==
As of 2025, this minor planet remains unnamed.
