= 2014 OO6 =

Near-Earth asteroid

2014 OO_{6}
Discovery
- Discovered by: Pan-STARRS (F51)
- Discovery date: 27 July 2014

Designations
- Minor planet category: Apollo; NEO

Orbital characteristics
- Epoch 13 January 2016 (JD 2457400.5)
- Uncertainty parameter 4
- Observation arc: 154 days
- Aphelion: 3.6991 AU (553.38 Gm) (Q)
- Perihelion: 0.70742 AU (105.829 Gm) (q)
- Semi-major axis: 2.2032 AU (329.59 Gm) (a)
- Eccentricity: 0.67892 (e)
- Orbital period (sidereal): 3.27 yr (1194.5 d)
- Mean anomaly: 140.83° (M)
- Mean motion: 0° 18^{m} 4.968^{s} / day (n)
- Inclination: 1.3817° (i)
- Longitude of ascending node: 111.17° (Ω)
- Argument of perihelion: 287.34° (ω)
- Earth MOID: 0.000161353 AU (24,138.1 km)

Physical characteristics
- Dimensions: ~75 meters; 60–140 meters
- Absolute magnitude (H): 23.1

2014 OO_{6} is an Apollo near-Earth asteroid discovered in 2014 and was the most dangerous one discovered in 2014 that remained on the Sentry Risk Table as of early December 2014. The asteroid is estimated to be roughly 75 meters (246 ft) in diameter and had a 1 in 83,000 chance of impacting Earth on 11 January 2051. However, the nominal best-fit orbit shows that 2014 OO_{6} will be 1.5 AU (220,000,000 km; 140,000,000 mi) from Earth on 11 January 2051.

It was discovered on 27 July 2014 by Pan-STARRS at an apparent magnitude of 20 using a 1.8-meter (71 in) Ritchey–Chrétien telescope. On 18 August 2014 the asteroid passed 0.02975 AU (4,451,000 km; 2,765,000 mi) from Earth. By 23 August 2014, the asteroid had dimmed to below magnitude 25. As of early December 2014, the asteroid had an observation arc of 24 days with an uncertainty parameter of 7. 2014 OO_{6} was recovered by Cerro Paranal Observatory on 23 and 26 December 2014 at magnitude 25 which extended the observation arc from 24 days to 154 days. The orbital refinement removed the impact risk for 11 January 2051.

With an absolute magnitude of 23.1, the asteroid is about 60–140 meters in diameter.

== See also ==
- List of asteroid close approaches to Earth in 2014
