= 2015 BP513 =

Near-Earth asteroid

2015 BP_{513}
Discovery
- Discovered by: Pan-STARRS 1 (first observered)
- Discovery site: Haleakala Obs.
- Discovery date: 27 January 2015

Designations
- Minor planet category: Apollo · NEO

Orbital characteristics
- Epoch 16 February 2017 (JD 2457800.5)
- Uncertainty parameter 7
- Observation arc: yr (10 days)
- Aphelion: 2.5160 AU
- Perihelion: 0.9450 AU
- Semi-major axis: 1.7305 AU
- Eccentricity: 0.4539
- Orbital period (sidereal): 2.28 yr (831 days)
- Mean anomaly: 338.74°
- Mean motion: 0° 25^{m} 58.8^{s} / day
- Inclination: 0.4894°
- Longitude of ascending node: 115.43°
- Argument of perihelion: 333.76°
- Earth MOID: 0.0004 AU

Physical characteristics
- Dimensions: 12–27 meters
- Absolute magnitude (H): 26.7

2015 BP_{513} is an Apollo near-Earth asteroid roughly 12–27 meters in diameter that passed less than 1 lunar distance from Earth on 18 January 2015.

== 2015 flyby ==
Until 18 January 2015 18:00 UT the small dim asteroid either had an elongation less than 45 degrees from the Sun or was significantly fainter than apparent magnitude 23. On 18 January 2015 13:36 UT the asteroid passed 0.00082 AU (123,000 km; 76,000 mi) from the Moon and at 17:09 UT passed 0.0016 AU (240,000 km; 150,000 mi) from Earth. The asteroid was not discovered until 9 days later on 27 January 2015 by Pan-STARRS at an apparent magnitude of 21 using a 1.8-meter (71 in) Ritchey–Chrétien telescope. Two precovery images from 19 January 2015 when the asteroid was apparent magnitude 16 were then located.
