= (842812) 2015 YU9 =

Main-belt asteroid

(842812) 2015 YU_{9}
Discovery
- Discovered by: CSS
- Discovery site: Mount Lemmon Obs.
- Discovery date: 16 December 2015

Designations
- Alternative designations: 2015 YB (deleted) (Note: Archived JPL Small Body Data Base, of JPL solution #1 for asteroid 2015 YB on 17 December 2015 with an observation arc of less than a 1 day. This database entry has been deleted since.); WY032FF
- Minor planet category: main-belt (inner) · Hungaria

Orbital characteristics
- Epoch 4 September 2017 (JD 2458000.5)
- Uncertainty parameter 5
- Observation arc: (32 days)
- Aphelion: 2.0210 AU
- Perihelion: 1.7786 AU
- Semi-major axis: 1.8998 AU
- Eccentricity: 0.0638
- Orbital period (sidereal): 2.62 yr (956 days)
- Mean anomaly: 231.75°
- Mean motion: 0° 22^{m} 35.04^{s} / day
- Inclination: 20.031°
- Longitude of ascending node: 236.54°
- Argument of perihelion: 208.74°

Physical characteristics
- Dimensions: 0.35 km (est. at 0.3)
- Absolute magnitude (H): 19.228

(842812) 2015 YU_{9} is a sub-kilometer Hungaria asteroid from the inner region of the asteroid belt, approximately 350 meters in diameter. It was first observed on 16 December 2015, by the Catalina Sky Survey at Mount Lemmon Observatory in Arizona, United States.

== Description ==
=== Orbit ===
2015 YU_{9} is a member of the dynamical Hungaria group, which form the innermost dense concentration of bright asteroids in the Solar System. It orbits the Sun at a distance of 1.8–2.0 AU once every 2 years and 7 months (956 days). Its orbit has an eccentricity of 0.06 and an inclination of 20° with respect to the ecliptic.

=== Discovery ===
Precovery images were taken by Pan-STARRS on 8 December 2015. At the time of discovery the asteroid was 0.8 AU (120,000,000 km; 74,000,000 mi) from Earth which is close to the Earth minimum orbit intersection distance (MOID). The asteroid came to perihelion (closest approach to the Sun) around 28 December 2015.

When the asteroid was first detected and it had an observation arc less than 1 day, the asteroid was suspected of being a Near-Earth asteroid that would make a close approach to Earth on 19 December 2015. But that orbit solution used an erroneous observation from the Catalina Sky Survey causing an incorrect orbit determination. The asteroid is not a near-Earth object.

=== Diameter and albedo ===
With an absolute magnitude of 19.2, the inner main-belt asteroid is approximately 350 meters in diameter, based on an assumed albedo of 0.3 – a typical compromise value between 0.4 and 0.2, corresponding to the Hungaria asteroids both as family and orbital group.

=== Incorrect media reports ===
Initial mass media reports for the size of the asteroid were incorrectly based on the assumption the asteroid was 0.02 AU from Earth and not 0.8 AU from Earth. On 31 December 2015 the asteroid received the provisional designation 2015 YU_{9}.
