= 2007 VE191 =

Near-Earth asteroid

2007 VE_{191}
Discovery
- Discovered by: Mt. Lemmon Survey (G96)
- Discovery date: 15 November 2007

Designations
- Minor planet category: NEO · Apollo

Orbital characteristics
- Epoch 21 November 2025 (JD 2461000.5)
- Uncertainty parameter 7
- Observation arc: 13 days (last seen 2007)
- Aphelion: 3.1100 AU (465.25 Gm) (Q)
- Perihelion: 0.71131 AU (106.410 Gm) (q)
- Semi-major axis: 1.9107 AU (285.84 Gm) (a)
- Eccentricity: 0.62772 (e)
- Orbital period (sidereal): 2.64 yr (964.66 d)
- Mean anomaly: 274.22° (M)
- Mean motion: 0° 22^{m} 23.484^{s} /day (n)
- Inclination: 5.3848° (i)
- Longitude of ascending node: 244.09° (Ω)
- Argument of perihelion: 254.29° (ω)
- Earth MOID: 0.00042694 AU (63,869 km)
- Jupiter MOID: 1.99054 AU (297.781 Gm)

Physical characteristics
- Dimensions: ~63 meters 50–110 meters
- Absolute magnitude (H): 23.6

2007 VE_{191} is a sub-kilometer asteroid, classified as a near-Earth asteroid of the Apollo group that was listed on the Sentry Risk Table.

== Description ==
It is estimated to be roughly 63 meters in diameter. In 2015 it was known to have a 1 in 63,000 chance of impacting Earth on 27 November 2015. However, the nominal best-fit orbit showed that 2007 VE_{191} would be roughly 0.5 AU (75,000,000 km; 46,000,000 mi) from Earth on 27 November 2015 with an apparent magnitude of roughly +25 in the constellation of Virgo about 50 degrees from the Sun, and the same nominal orbit gave a distance of closest approach to Earth of a little under 0.4 AU a few weeks earlier. It was removed from the Sentry Risk Table on 17 September 2015, but was still listed at NEODyS with odds of 1 in 3 million for 27 November 2015 during the approach window.

2007 VE_{191} was discovered on 15 November 2007 by the Mount Lemmon Survey at an apparent magnitude of 20 using a 1.5-meter (59 in) reflecting telescope. On 28 November 2007, it passed 0.0128 AU (1,910,000 km; 1,190,000 mi) from Earth. 2007 VE_{191} has an observation arc of 13 days with an uncertainty parameter of 7, which means its orbit is poorly constrained. 2007 VE_{191} was last observed on 28 November 2007. By 1 December 2007, the asteroid had faded to below magnitude 25.

With an absolute magnitude of 23.6, 2007 VE_{191} is about 50–110 meters in diameter.
