= 2015 HM10 =

Irregular shaped asteroid and sub-kilometer near-Earth object

2015 HM_{10}
Discovery
- Discovered by: DeCam–DES
- Discovery site: Cerro Tololo Obs.
- Discovery date: 19 April 2015

Designations
- Minor planet category: NEO · Apollo; Amor

Orbital characteristics
- Epoch 4 September 2017 (JD 2458000.5)
- Uncertainty parameter 3
- Observation arc: 0.39 yr (141 days)
- Aphelion: 4.0411 AU
- Perihelion: 1.0085 AU
- Semi-major axis: 2.5248 AU
- Eccentricity: 0.6006
- Orbital period (sidereal): 4.01 yr (1,465 days)
- Mean anomaly: 195.53°
- Mean motion: 0° 14^{m} 44.52^{s} / day
- Inclination: 1.4699°
- Longitude of ascending node: 283.27°
- Argument of perihelion: 353.48°
- Earth MOID: 0.0022 AU · 0.9 LD

Physical characteristics
- Dimensions: 0.057 km (calculated)
- Synodic rotation period: 0.3761±0.0001 h 0.3763±0.0003 h
- Geometric albedo: 0.20 (assumed)
- Spectral type: S (assumed)
- Absolute magnitude (H): 23.6

2015 HM_{10} is an irregular shaped asteroid and sub-kilometer near-Earth object that passed near the Earth on 7 July 2015, at a distance of 442,000 kilometers or 1.15 lunar distances.

First observed on 19 April 2015, by astronomers of the Dark Energy Survey at Cerro Tololo Observatory in Chile, the asteroid measures approximately 60 meters in diameter and is classified as a member of the Apollo and Amor group, respectively. It is a fast rotator with a rotation period of 22.6 minutes.

== Discovery ==
It was first observed on 19 April 2015, by astronomers of the Dark Energy Survey, using the Dark Energy Camera (DECam, W84) mounted on the Víctor M. Blanco Telescope located at Cerro Tololo Inter-American Observatory in Chile.

== Orbit and classification ==
2015 HM_{10} has been classified as a near-Earth object of the Apollo and Amor group, respectively.

It orbits the Sun at a distance of 1.0–4.0 AU once every 4.01 years (1,465 days). Its orbit has an eccentricity of 0.60 and an inclination of 1° with respect to the ecliptic. The body's observation arc begins with a precovery taken at Cerro Tololo, the night prior to its official first observation.

=== Close encounters ===
2015 HM_{10} has an Earth minimum orbital intersection distance of 0.0022 AU (329,000 km) which corresponds to 0.9 lunar distances. On 7 July 2015, it passed Earth at 0.00295299 AU (442,000 km), or 1.15 lunar distances. On the following day, it passed the Moon at 0.00276 AU (413,000 km). This was the asteroid's closest approach to Earth until at least 2419.

== Physical characteristics ==
2015 HM_{10} is an assumed to be a stony S-type asteroid.

=== Rotation and shape ===
During 2015, two rotational light curves of 2015 HM_{10} were obtained from photometric observations by Brian Warner at the Palmer Divide Station (U82) in California and by astronomers of the Mission Accessible Near-Earth Objects Survey (MANOS). Lightcurve analysis gave a rotation period of 0.3761 and 0.3763 hours (22.6 minutes) with a brightness amplitude of 1.50 and 1.29 magnitude (U=3/3-), indicative of a non-spheroidal shape. It is among the fastest rotators known to exists.

In July 2015, high-resolution images of 2015 HM_{10} were obtained from radiometric observations made with the Very Long Baseline Array, the Arecibo Observatory, and the 34 and 70-meter antennas at Goldstone. These observations confirmed the body's short rotation period and complex and irregular, and revealed, that it has a long-axis extent of 80–100 meters with an equatorial aspect ratio of about 2:1. Any significant non-principal axis rotation, commonly known as "tumbling" could be ruled out. The radar images also showed angular features up to approximately 30 meters across, with a cluster of radar-bright pixels following its rotation, and consistent with a high standing, 15 to 20 meters wide feature.

=== Diameter and albedo ===
The Collaborative Asteroid Lightcurve Link assumes a standard albedo for stony asteroids of 0.20 and calculates a mean-diameter of 57.0 meters based on an absolute magnitude of 23.6. At its widest point, the object is 80 meters long.

== Numbering and naming ==
As of 2017, this minor planet has neither been numbered nor named.
