= 2009 RR =

Small risk–listed near-Earth asteroid

Discovery
- Discovered by: Catalina Sky Survey (703)
- Discovery date: 11 September 2009

Designations
- Designation: 2009 RR
- Minor planet category: NEO; Apollo

Orbital characteristics
- Epoch 13 January 2016 (JD 2457400.5)
- Uncertainty parameter 7
- Observation arc: 4 days (last seen 2009)
- Aphelion: 2.0753 AU (310.46 Gm)
- Perihelion: 0.75416 AU (112.821 Gm)
- Semi-major axis: 1.4147 AU (211.64 Gm)
- Eccentricity: 0.46693
- Orbital period (sidereal): 1.68 yr (614.63 d)
- Mean anomaly: 252.65°
- Mean motion: 0° 35^{m} 8.592^{s} /day (n)
- Inclination: 6.1464°
- Longitude of ascending node: 174.21°
- Argument of perihelion: 256.21°
- Earth MOID: 0.0028846 AU (431,530 km)

Physical characteristics
- Dimensions: ~26 meters (85 ft); 20–45 meters
- Mass: 2.4×10^{7} kg (assumed)
- Absolute magnitude (H): 25.5

2009 RR is a micro-asteroid, classified as a near-Earth object of the Apollo group. It was discovered on 11 September 2009 by the Catalina Sky Survey at an apparent magnitude of 19.5 using a 0.68-meter (27 in) Schmidt–Cassegrain telescope. 2009 RR was the only asteroid discovered before 2014 that was predicted to potentially pass inside the orbit of the Moon during 2014. The asteroid has an estimated diameter of 26 meters (85 ft) and is listed on the Sentry Risk Table. It is not large enough to qualify as a potentially hazardous object.

== Description ==
With an observation arc of only 4 days, the asteroid has a poorly determined orbit. It is already known that there is no risk of an Earth impact before 2098. The power of such an air burst would be somewhere between the Chelyabinsk meteor and the Tunguska event depending on the actual size of the asteroid.

The nominal orbit shows that on 16 September 2014 the asteroid could have passed just inside one lunar distance from Earth, but the orbital uncertainties show that it could have passed as much as 0.1 AU (15,000,000 km; 9,300,000 mi) from Earth. On 9 September 2014 the full moon may have only been 15 degrees from the 20th magnitude asteroid, making it difficult to detect the asteroid. The asteroid was estimated to be brighter than magnitude 20 from 10 September until 16 September 2014. 2009 RR was not recovered during the 2014 approach and thus probably passed more than one lunar distance from Earth.
