= Slooh =

Robotic telescope service viewable online

Slooh.com
- Website type: Service provider
- Owner: Michael Paolucci (Founder)
- Website: slooh.com
- Commercial: Yes
- Registration: Yes
- Launched: December 25, 2003
- Current status: Active

Slooh is a robotic telescope service that can be viewed live through a web browser. It was not the first robotic telescope, but it was the first that offered "live" viewing through a telescope via the web. Other online telescopes traditionally email a picture to the recipient. The site has a patent on their live image processing method. Slooh is an online astronomy platform with live-views and telescope rental for a fee. Observations come from a global network of telescopes located in places including Spain and Chile and Siding Spring Australia.

The name Slooh comes from the word "slew" to indicate the movement of a telescope, modified with "ooh" to express pleasure and surprise.

Slooh, LLC is based in Washington, Connecticut.

== History ==
The service was founded in 2002 by Michael Paolucci. Its Canary Islands telescope went online December 25, 2003, but was not available to the public until 2004.

== Participating observatories ==
The original astronomical observatory is located on the island Tenerife in the Canary Islands on the volcano called Teide. The site is at the 2,300-metre (7,500 ft) elevation and situated away from city light pollution. This (Canary Islands) site includes 2 domes, each with 2 telescopes. Each dome has a high-magnification telescope and a wide-field telescope. One dome is optimized for planetary views (e.g., more magnification and a different CCD), and the other is optimized for deep sky objects (e.g., less magnification, more light sensitive CCD). Each dome offers 2 telescopic views: one high magnification (narrow field) view through a 14-inch (360 mm) Celestron Schmidt-Cassegrain telescope; and a wide view through either a telephoto lens or an APO refractor. In 2012, the Slooh.com Canary Islands Observatory was assigned observatory code G40.

On February 14, 2009, Slooh launched a second observatory in the hills above La Dehesa, Chile. This site offers views from the Southern Hemisphere. In 2014, the Slooh.com Chile Observatory was assigned observatory code W88.

Unlike Google Sky which features images from the Hubble Space Telescope, Slooh can take new images of the sky with its telescopes.

== See also ==
- Amateur astronomy
- LightBuckets
- Lists of telescopes
