= (357439) 2004 BL86 =

Near-Earth asteroid discovered in 2004

(357439) 2004 BL_{86}
- Goldstone radar image of 2004 BL_{86} and its minor-planet moon

Discovery
- Discovered by: LINEAR
- Discovery site: Lincoln Lab's ETS
- Discovery date: 30 January 2004

Designations
- Minor planet category: NEO · PHA · Apollo

Orbital characteristics
- Epoch 4 September 2017 (JD 2458000.5)
- Uncertainty parameter 0
- Observation arc: 4,863 d (13.31 yr)
- Aphelion: 2.1070 AU
- Perihelion: 0.8974 AU
- Semi-major axis: 1.5022 AU
- Eccentricity: 0.4026
- Orbital period (sidereal): 673 d (1.84 yr)
- Mean anomaly: 169.27°
- Mean motion: 0° 32^{m} 7.08^{s} / day
- Inclination: 23.775°
- Longitude of ascending node: 126.69°
- Argument of perihelion: 311.45°
- Known satellites: 1
- Earth MOID: 0.0092 AU (3.6 LD)

Physical characteristics
- Mean diameter: 0.263±0.026 km 0.290±0.030 km 0.325±0.025 km (Note: Radar Team 2015a: diameter primary 0.325±0.025 km. Diameter secondary 0.070 km. The satellites discovery is credited to Pollock et al. Summary figures for (357439) 2004 BL_{86} at LCDB)
- Synodic rotation period: 2.620±0.001 h 2.6205±0.0003 h 2.637±0.024 h
- Geometric albedo: 0.40; 0.40±0.08
- Spectral type: V
- Absolute magnitude (H): 19.05; 19.3; 19.51±0.02

(357439) 2004 BL_{86} is a bright sub-kilometer asteroid and binary system, classified as a near-Earth object and potentially hazardous asteroid of the Apollo group, approximately 300 meters (980 ft) in diameter. It was discovered on 30 January 2004 by astronomers of the Lincoln Near-Earth Asteroid Research at Lincoln Laboratory's Experimental Test Site near Socorro, New Mexico. Its 70-meter (200 ft) moon was discovered during the asteroid's close approach to the Earth in January 2015.

== 2015 Earth approach ==
On 26 January 2015 at 16:20 UTC, 2004 BL_{86} passed 1,199,600 km (745,400 mi), or 3.1 lunar distances, from Earth. The asteroid briefly peaked around apparent magnitude 9 and was near the celestial equator. The asteroid was visible in telescopes with objectives of 100 mm (4 in) or larger; high-end binoculars under a dark sky may also have worked. Near closest approach the asteroid was moving about 2.5 degrees per hour (2.5 arcseconds per second). The asteroid came to opposition (furthest elongation in the sky from the Sun) on 27 January 2015 at 04:37 UTC. Around 5:00 UTC, the asteroid was near M44 (the Beehive Cluster).

The 26 January 2015 approach of 3.1 lunar distances was the closest approach of 2004 BL_{86} for at least the next 200 years. For comparison, 2015 TB145, about twice the size of 2004 BL_{86}, passed 486,800 km (302,500 mi), or 1.3 lunar distances, from Earth on 31 October 2015.

== Satellite ==
A minor-planet moon orbiting (357439) 2004 BL_{86} was first detected by ground-based telescopes by Joe Pollock and Petr Pravec. Observations by the Goldstone Deep Space Communications Complex and Green Bank Telescope confirmed that it is a binary asteroid with a secondary roughly 70 meters (200 ft) across. The secondary is estimated to orbit at least 500 meters (1,600 ft) from the primary. About 16% of asteroids over 200 meters (660 ft) in diameter are thought to be binaries.

== Numbering and naming ==
This minor planet was numbered on 27 March 2013 (M.P.C. 83151). As of 2020, it has not been named.

== Gallery ==
Animation of 2004 BL_{86}'s orbit
Sun · Earth · 2004 BL_{86}

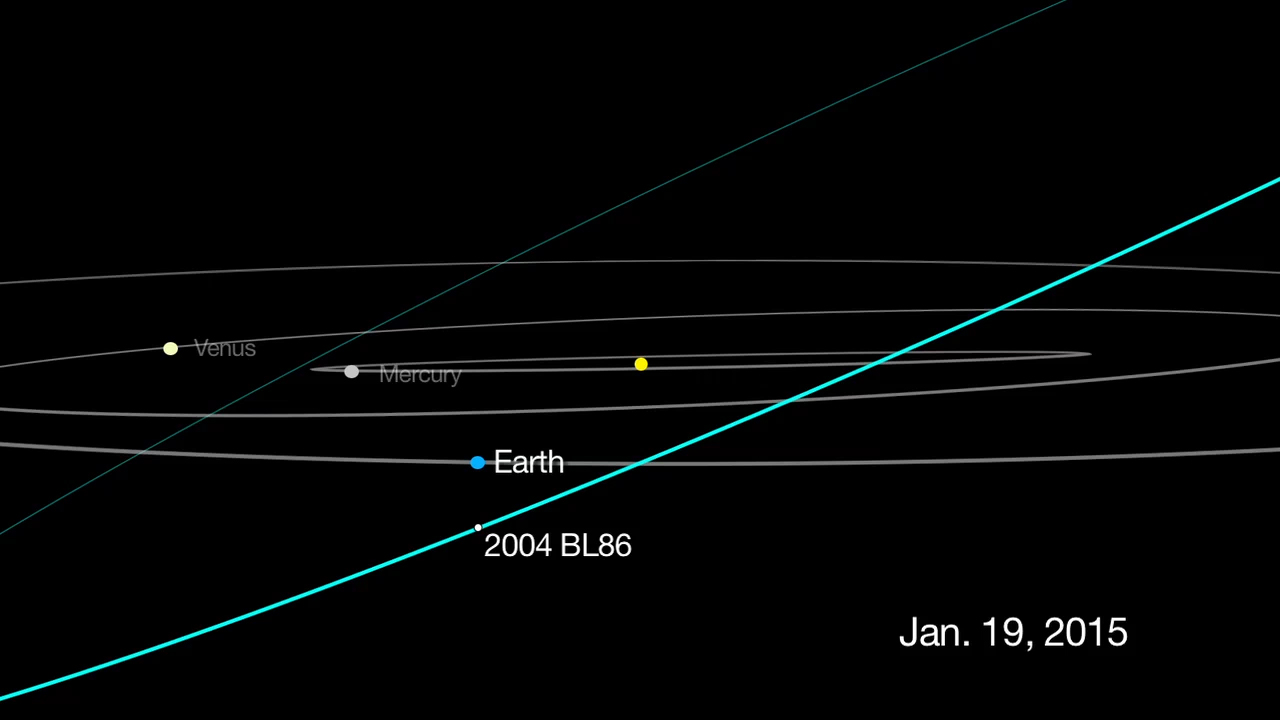
2004 BL_{86} safely passes Earth on 26 January 2015

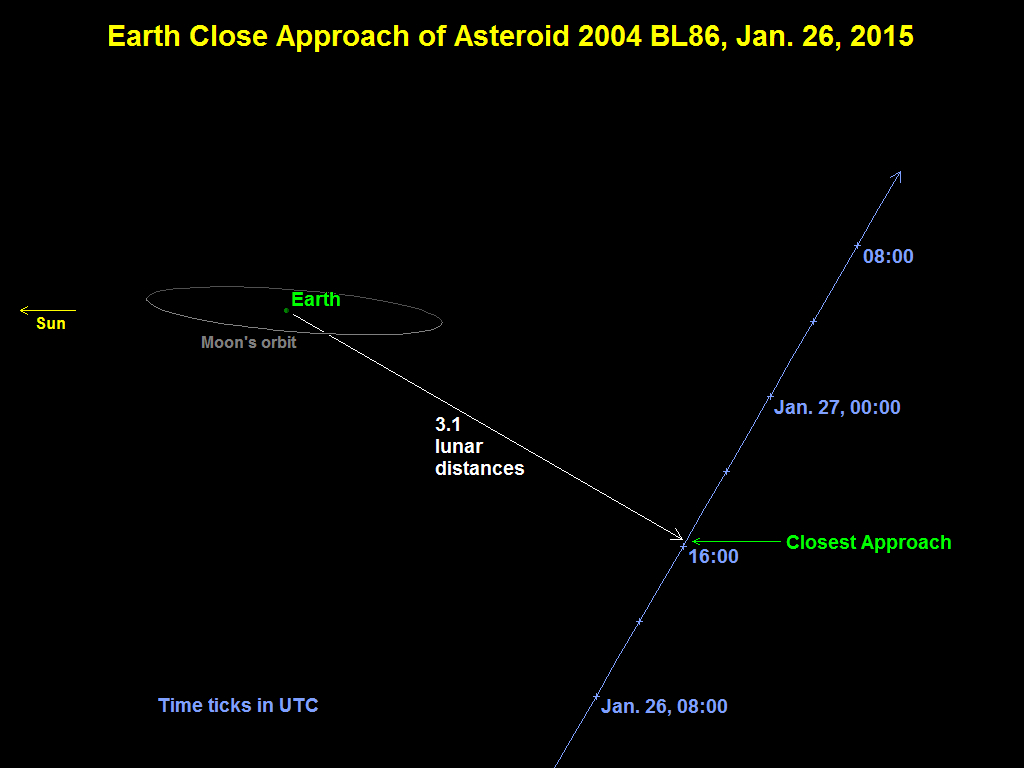
Trajectory of 2004 BL_{86} during Earth close approach

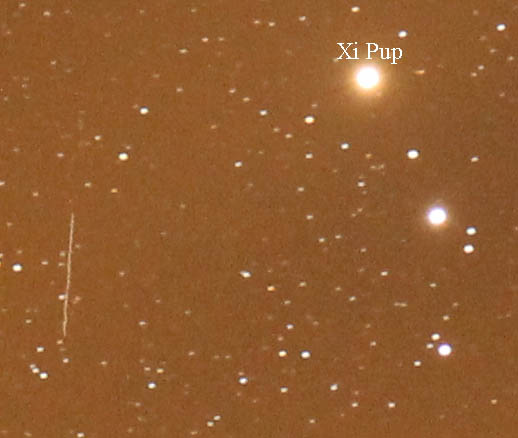
2004 BL_{86} (star trail on left) near Xi Puppis

Another gif of 2004 BL_{86} and its moon.
