= List of asteroid close approaches to Earth in 2020 =

- Asteroids which came closer to Earth than the Moon in 2020 by time of discovery
- After closest approach: 66 (58.9%)
- < 24 hours before: 18 (16.1%)
- up to 7 days before: 26 (23.2%)
- > one week before: 2 (1.8%)
- > 7 weeks before: 0 (0.0%)
- > one year before: 0 (0.0%)
Other years

- Asteroids which came closer to Earth than the Moon in 2020 by discoverer
- G96 Mount Lemmon Survey: 43 (38.4%); F51 Pan-STARRS 1: 16 (14.3%); 703 Catalina Sky Survey: 14 (12.5%); T08 ATLAS-MLO: 12 (10.7%); T05 ATLAS-HKO: 6 (5.4%); 381 Tokyo-Kiso: 5 (4.5%); F52 Pan-STARRS 2: 5 (4.5%); I41 Zwicky Transient facility: 5 (4.5%); P07 SST, HEH Station: 3 (2.7%); D29 Purple Mountain Observatory: 2 (1.8%); (-) L. Buzzi: 1 (0.9%)

- Prediction accuracy for asteroids of magnitude 27 or larger predicted to pass within 1 lunar distance of Earth in 2020 (Note: Absolute magnitude 27 is the estimated magnitude of the Chelyabinsk meteor, which caused widespread damage and injury, but no deaths. Objects smaller than this are excluded.)
- Unpredicted: 22 (100.0%); Predicted but not observed: 0 (0.0%); Observed but details incorrect: 0 (0.0%); Distance correct but not date: 0 (0.0%); Date correct but not distance: 0 (0.0%); Successfully predicted: 0 (0.0%)

Below is the list of asteroid close approaches to Earth in 2020.

== Timeline of known close approaches less than one lunar distance from Earth ==
Radar animation of asteroid 1998 OR2, which came within 16 lunar distances in April 2020

A list of known near-Earth asteroid close approaches less than 1 lunar distance (0.0025696 AU (384,410 km; 238,860 mi)) from Earth in 2020, based on the close approach database of the Center for Near-Earth Object Studies (CNEOS).

For reference, the radius of Earth is about 0.0000426 AU (6,370 km; 3,960 mi) or 0.0166 lunar distances. Geosynchronous satellites have an orbit with semi-major axis length of 0.000282 AU (42,200 km; 26,200 mi) or 0.110 lunar distances. A number of known asteroids came closer than this in 2020, notably 2020 CW, 2020 JJ, 2020 QG, and 2020 VT4 which all approached Earth within 0.05 lunar distances. At 0.0000451 AU (0.0176 LD; 6,750 km; 4,190 mi) from the center of the Earth or about 370 km (230 mi) above the surface of the Earth, the 13 November 2020 close approach of 2020 VT_{4} was the closest approach of an asteroid ever observed without atmospheric contact, and still holds this record as of February 2025.

Two objects have been observed to be temporary satellites of Earth: 2020 CD3 in February 2020 and 2020 SO in September 2020, albeit the latter has been confirmed to be a rocket booster from the Surveyor 2 mission launched in 1966, leading to its de-listing as asteroid.

The largest asteroid to pass within 1 LD of Earth in 2020 was 2020 LD with an estimated diameter of around 145 meters and an absolute magnitude of 22.4. The fastest asteroid to pass within 1 LD of Earth in 2020 was 2020 FD_{2} that passed Earth with a velocity with respect to Earth of 33.4 km/s (75,000 mph). (Note: 2020 FD_{2} passed Earth with a velocity with respect to Earth of 33.4 km/s and was moving away from the Sun at 38.6 km/s.)

The CNEOS database of close approaches lists some close approaches a full orbit or more before the discovery of the object, derived by orbit calculation. The list below only includes close approaches that are evidenced by observations, thus the pre-discovery close approaches are only included if the object was found by precovery.

This list and the relevant databases do not consider impacts as close approaches, thus this list does not include any of the objects that collided with Earth's atmosphere in 2020, none of which were discovered in advance, but were observed visually or recorded by sensors designed to detect detonation of nuclear devices.

Rows highlighted red indicate objects which were not discovered until after closest approach

Rows highlighted yellow indicate objects discovered less than 24 hours before closest approach

Rows highlighted green indicate objects discovered more than one week before closest approach

Rows highlighted turquoise indicate objects discovered more than 7 weeks before closest approach

Rows highlighted blue indicate objects discovered more than one year before closest approach
(i.e. objects successfully cataloged on a previous orbit, rather than being detected during final approach)

Date of closest approach	Date discovered	Object	Nominal geocentric distance (Note: Distance from the center of Earth to the center of the object. See the NASA/JPL Solar System Dynamics Glossary: Geocentric. Earth has a radius of approximately 6,400 km (0.0166 LD).)		Approx. size (m)	(H) (abs. mag.)	Closer approach to Moon (Note: Objects that approached closer to the Moon than Earth are marked with a check.)	References
Date of closest approach	Date discovered	Object	(AU)	(Lunar distance)	Approx. size (m)	(H) (abs. mag.)	Closer approach to Moon	References
2020-01-02	2020-01-04	2020 AP1	0.002185 AU (326,900 km; 203,100 mi)	0.850	3.2–7.1	29.6	✓	data · 2020 AP_{1}
2020-01-20	2020-01-22	2020 BK_{3}	0.001998 AU (298,900 km; 185,700 mi)	0.778	11–25	26.9	—	data · 2020 BK_{3}
2020-01-22	2020-01-23	2020 BB_{5}	0.001775 AU (265,500 km; 165,000 mi)	0.691	3.1–6.8	29.7	—	data · 2020 BB_{5}
2020-01-25	2020-01-24	2020 BH_{6}	0.000469 AU (70,200 km; 43,600 mi)	0.183	5.1–11	28.6	—	data · 2020 BH_{6}
2020-01-27	2020-01-28	2020 BA_{13}	0.001321 AU (197,600 km; 122,800 mi)	0.514	4.4–9.9	28.9	—	data · 2020 BA_{13}
2020-01-28	2020-01-30	2020 BA_{15}	0.002517 AU (376,500 km; 234,000 mi)	0.980	8.8–20	27.4	✓	data · 2020 BA_{15}
2020-01-29	2020-01-28	2020 BZ_{13}	0.000716 AU (107,100 km; 66,600 mi)	0.279	2.8–6.2	29.9	—	data · 2020 BZ_{13}
2020-01-31	2020-02-02	2020 CZ	0.002105 AU (314,900 km; 195,700 mi)	0.819	3.5–7.8	29.4	—	data · 2020 CZ
2020-01-31	2020-02-02	2020 CJ	0.002363 AU (353,500 km; 219,700 mi)	0.919	11–25	26.9	✓	data · 2020 CJ
2020-02-01	2020-02-01	2020 CW	0.000105 AU (15,700 km; 9,800 mi)	0.041	0.82–1.8	32.6	—	data · 2020 CW
2020-02-02	2020-02-01	2020 CA	0.001466 AU (219,300 km; 136,300 mi)	0.570	3.2–7.1	29.6	—	data · 2020 CA
2020-02-03	2020-01-31	2020 BT_{14}	0.001255 AU (187,700 km; 116,700 mi)	0.489	7.7–17	27.7	—	data · 2020 BT_{14}
2020-02-04	2020-02-05	2020 CQ_{1}	0.000431 AU (64,500 km; 40,100 mi)	0.168	4.5–10	28.9	—	data · 2020 CQ_{1}
2020-02-13	2020-02-16	2020 DU	0.002172 AU (324,900 km; 201,900 mi)	0.845	4.8–11	28.7	✓	data · 2020 DU
2020-02-13	2020-02-15	2020 CD3	0.000315 AU (47,100 km; 29,300 mi)	0.122	1.2–2.7	31.7	—	data · 2020 CD_{3}
2020-02-14	2020-02-15	2020 CQ_{2}	0.000990 AU (148,100 km; 92,000 mi)	0.385	5.1–11	28.6	—	data · 2020 CQ_{2}
2020-02-17	2020-02-17	2020 DP_{14}	0.000803 AU (120,100 km; 74,600 mi)	0.312	2.3–5.2	30.3	—	data · 2020 DP_{14}
2020-02-18	2020-02-17	2020 DA_{1}	0.001294 AU (193,600 km; 120,300 mi)	0.503	2.9–6.5	29.8	—	data · 2020 DA_{1}
2020-02-18	2020-02-16	2020 DW	0.001612 AU (241,200 km; 149,800 mi)	0.628	2.2–4.9	30.4	—	data · 2020 DW
2020-02-25	2020-02-27	2020 DR_{4}	0.000622 AU (93,000 km; 57,800 mi)	0.242	3.0–6.7	29.8	—	data · 2020 DR_{4}
2020-03-14	2020-03-17	2020 FD_{2}	0.002190 AU (327,600 km; 203,600 mi)	0.852	19–43	25.7	—	data · 2020 FD_{2}
2020-03-18	2020-03-16	2020 FD	0.001714 AU (256,400 km; 159,300 mi)	0.667	7.8–17	27.7	✓	data · 2020 FD
2020-03-19	2020-03-23	2020 FG_{4}	0.001262 AU (188,800 km; 117,300 mi)	0.491	11–25	26.9	—	data · 2020 FG_{4}
2020-03-22	2020-03-19	2020 FL_{2}	0.000987 AU (147,700 km; 91,700 mi)	0.384	16–36	26.1	—	data · 2020 FL_{2}
2020-03-25	2020-03-24	2020 FJ_{4}	0.001716 AU (256,700 km; 159,500 mi)	0.668	3.3–7.5	29.5	—	data · 2020 FJ_{4}
2020-03-31	2020-03-31	2020 FB_{7}	0.000521 AU (77,900 km; 48,400 mi)	0.203	16–36	26.1	—	data · 2020 FB_{7}
2020-04-01	2020-04-02	2020 GO_{1}	0.000461 AU (69,000 km; 42,900 mi)	0.180	8.0–18	27.6	—	data · 2020 GO_{1}
2020-04-03	2020-04-02	2020 GH	0.000837 AU (125,200 km; 77,800 mi)	0.326	4.2–9.4	29.0	—	data · 2020 GH
2020-04-05	2020-04-05	2020 GY_{1}	0.000537 AU (80,300 km; 49,900 mi)	0.209	13–28	26.6	—	data · 2020 GY_{1}
2020-04-15	2020-04-16	2020 HO	0.001929 AU (288,600 km; 179,300 mi)	0.751	5.1–11	28.6	—	data · 2020 HO
2020-04-15	2020-04-11	2020 GH_{2}	0.002401 AU (359,200 km; 223,200 mi)	0.934	13–28	26.6	—	data · 2020 GH_{2}
2020-04-22	2020-04-24	2020 HM_{6}	0.001088 AU (162,800 km; 101,100 mi)	0.424	13–28	26.6	✓	data · 2020 HM_{6}
2020-04-22	2020-04-23	2020 HF_{5}	0.000979 AU (146,500 km; 91,000 mi)	0.381	12–27	26.7	—	data · 2020 HF_{5}
2020-04-22	2020-04-23	2020 HU_{7}	0.000869 AU (130,000 km; 80,800 mi)	0.338	3.1–6.8	29.7	—	data · 2020 HU_{7}
2020-04-24	2020-04-19	2020 HX_{3}	0.001688 AU (252,500 km; 156,900 mi)	0.657	9.7–22	27.2	✓	data · 2020 HX_{3}
2020-04-26	2020-04-27	2020 HT_{8}	0.000986 AU (147,500 km; 91,700 mi)	0.384	5.1–11	28.6	—	data · 2020 HT_{8}
2020-04-27	2020-04-22	2020 HP_{6}	0.000841 AU (125,800 km; 78,200 mi)	0.327	6.7–15	28.0	—	data · 2020 HP_{6}
2020-04-28	2020-04-27	2020 HS7	0.000286 AU (42,800 km; 26,600 mi)	0.111	4.0–9.0	29.1	—	data · 2020 HS_{7}
2020-04-30	2020-05-02	2020 JG	0.001430 AU (213,900 km; 132,900 mi)	0.556	18–41	25.8	✓	data · 2020 JG
2020-05-03	2020-05-01	2020 JA	0.001598 AU (239,100 km; 148,500 mi)	0.622	9.7–22	27.2	—	data · 2020 JA
2020-05-04	2020-05-04	2020 JJ	0.000090 AU (13,500 km; 8,400 mi)	0.03	2.8–6.2	29.9	—	data · 2020 JJ
2020-05-05	2020-05-04	2020 JV_{38}	0.001402 AU (209,700 km; 130,300 mi)	0.546	8.2–18	27.6	✓	data · 2020 JV_{38}
2020-05-05	2020-05-04	2020 JN	0.001666 AU (249,200 km; 154,900 mi)	0.648	8.8–20	27.4	✓	data · 2020 JN
2020-05-09	2021-04-04 (Note: Precovery around this close approach: 2020-05-26)	2021 GM_{1}	0.001814 AU (271,400 km; 168,600 mi)	0.706	2.2–4.9	30.4	✓	data · 2021 GM_{1}
2020-05-28	2020-05-26	2020 KF_{5}	0.001649 AU (246,700 km; 153,300 mi)	0.642	3.5–7.8	29.4	—	data · 2020 KF_{5}
2020-05-28	2020-05-24	2020 KJ_{4}	0.000959 AU (143,500 km; 89,100 mi)	0.373	2.8–6.2	29.9	—	data · 2020 KJ_{4}
2020-05-29	2020-05-26	2020 KC_{5}	0.002470 AU (369,500 km; 229,600 mi)	0.961	8.8–20	27.4	—	data · 2020 KC_{5}
2020-06-05	2020-06-07	2020 LD	0.002048 AU (306,400 km; 190,400 mi)	0.797	89–200	22.4	—	data · 2020 LD
2020-06-13	2020-06-16	2020 ML_{2}	0.002378 AU (355,700 km; 221,000 mi)	0.926	7.0–16	27.9	—	data · 2020 ML_{2}
2020-06-23	2020-06-23	2020 ME_{63}	0.001052 AU (157,400 km; 97,800 mi)	0.410	1.1–2.5	31.9	—	data · 2020 ME_{63}
2020-07-05	2020-07-06	2020 NB	0.001193 AU (178,500 km; 110,900 mi)	0.464	15–35	26.2	—	data · 2020 NB
2020-07-09	2020-07-09	2020 NW_{8}	0.000648 AU (96,900 km; 60,200 mi)	0.252	0.84–1.9	32.5	—	data · 2020 NW_{8}
2020-07-27	2020-07-26	2020 OY4	0.000277 AU (41,400 km; 25,700 mi)	0.108	2.3–5.1	30.4	—	data · 2020 OY_{4}
2020-08-01	2020-08-01	2020 PA	0.000387 AU (57,900 km; 36,000 mi)	0.151	4.5–10	28.8	—	data · 2020 PA
2020-08-11	2020-08-14	2020 PX_{5}	0.001526 AU (228,300 km; 141,900 mi)	0.594	3.3–7.3	29.6	—	data · 2020 PX_{5}
2020-08-12	2020-08-22	2020 QJ_{5}	0.001976 AU (295,600 km; 183,700 mi)	0.769	12–27	26.7	—	data · 2020 QJ_{5}
2020-08-14	2020-08-14	2020 PW_{2}	0.001867 AU (279,300 km; 173,500 mi)	0.727	4.6–10	28.8	—	data · 2020 PW_{2}
2020-08-16	2020-08-16	2020 QG	0.000062 AU (9,300 km; 5,800 mi)	0.024	2.8–6.2	29.9	—	data · 2020 QG
2020-08-18	2020-08-18	2020 QF_{2}	0.001402 AU (209,700 km; 130,300 mi)	0.546	7.0–16	27.9	—	data · 2020 QF_{2}
2020-08-20	2020-08-14	2020 PY_{2}	0.002342 AU (350,400 km; 217,700 mi)	0.911	13–30	26.5	✓	data · 2020 PY_{2}
2020-08-20	2020-08-20	2020 QY_{2}	0.000445 AU (66,600 km; 41,400 mi)	0.173	1.5–3.4	31.2	—	data · 2020 QY_{2}
2020-08-21	2020-08-22	2020 QN_{4}	0.001821 AU (272,400 km; 169,300 mi)	0.709	5.1–11	28.6	—	data · 2020 QN_{4}
2020-08-22	2020-08-23	2020 QQ_{4}	0.002062 AU (308,500 km; 191,700 mi)	0.802	4.6–10	28.8	—	data · 2020 QQ_{4}
2020-08-23	2020-08-25	2020 QR_{5}	0.002144 AU (320,700 km; 199,300 mi)	0.835	9.0–20	27.3	—	data · 2020 QR_{5}
2020-08-26	2020-08-26	2020 QK_{111}	0.000901 AU (134,800 km; 83,800 mi)	0.351	2.9–6.5	29.8	—	data · 2020 QK_{111}
2020-09-09	2020-09-12	2020 RE_{5}	0.001639 AU (245,200 km; 152,400 mi)	0.638	4.0–9.0	29.1	—	data · 2020 RE_{5}
2020-09-10	2020-09-13	2020 RG_{10}	0.000909 AU (136,000 km; 84,500 mi)	0.354	4.6–10	28.8	—	data · 2020 RG_{10}
2020-09-13	2020-09-17	2020 SP	0.002220 AU (332,100 km; 206,400 mi)	0.864	10–23	27.1	—	data · 2020 SP
2020-09-14	2020-09-12	2020 RF_{3}	0.000629 AU (94,100 km; 58,500 mi)	0.245	5.3–12	28.5	—	data · 2020 RF_{3}
2020-09-14	2020-09-12	2020 RD_{4}	0.000707 AU (105,800 km; 65,700 mi)	0.275	3.1–6.8	29.7	—	data · 2020 RD_{4}
2020-09-17	2020-09-15	2020 RZ_{6}	0.002272 AU (339,900 km; 211,200 mi)	0.884	13–29	26.5	—	data · 2020 RZ_{6}
2020-09-19	2020-09-20	2020 SZ_{2}	0.002449 AU (366,400 km; 227,600 mi)	0.953	3.5–7.8	29.4	—	data · 2020 SZ_{2}
2020-09-23	2020-09-26	2020 SG_{6}	0.001486 AU (222,300 km; 138,100 mi)	0.578	3.7–8.2	29.3	—	data · 2020 SG_{6}
2020-09-24	2020-09-18	2020 SW	0.000188 AU (28,100 km; 17,500 mi)	0.073	4.1–9.2	29.1	—	data · 2020 SW
2020-09-24	2020-09-25	2020 SN_{5}	0.001347 AU (201,500 km; 125,200 mi)	0.524	6.3–14	28.1	—	data · 2020 SN_{5}
2020-09-26	2020-09-23	2020 SQ_{4}	0.002363 AU (353,500 km; 219,700 mi)	0.920	4.4–9.8	28.9	—	data · 2020 SQ_{4}
2020-10-01	2020-10-04	2020 TA	0.001475 AU (220,700 km; 137,100 mi)	0.574	21–47	25.5	—	data · 2020 TA
2020-10-09	2020-10-10	2020 TE_{5}	0.000380 AU (56,800 km; 35,300 mi)	0.148	4.2–9.3	29.0	—	data · 2020 TE_{5}
2020-10-12	2020-10-08	2020 TS_{1}	0.001704 AU (254,900 km; 158,400 mi)	0.663	3.8–8.6	29.2	—	data · 2020 TS_{1}
2020-10-13	2020-10-15	2020 TD_{7}	0.002273 AU (340,000 km; 211,300 mi)	0.885	12–26	26.8	—	data · 2020 TD_{7}
2020-10-14	2020-10-15	2020 TK_{7}	0.000503 AU (75,200 km; 46,800 mi)	0.196	3.2–7.0	29.6	—	data · 2020 TK_{7}
2020-10-15	2020-10-17	2020 UE	0.001821 AU (272,400 km; 169,300 mi)	0.709	21–46	25.5	✓	data · 2020 UE
2020-10-17	2020-10-15	2020 TG_{6}	0.000929 AU (139,000 km; 86,400 mi)	0.361	4.0–9.0	29.1	—	data · 2020 TG_{6}
2020-10-18	2020-10-15	2020 TE_{6}	0.001539 AU (230,200 km; 143,100 mi)	0.599	8.4–19	27.5	✓	data · 2020 TE_{6}
2020-10-19	2020-10-17	2020 UX	0.001268 AU (189,700 km; 117,900 mi)	0.493	1.6–3.5	31.1	—	data · 2020 UX
2020-10-19	2020-10-15	2020 TF_{1}	0.001026 AU (153,500 km; 95,400 mi)	0.399	8.0–18	27.6	—	data · 2020 TF_{6}
2020-10-21	2020-10-16	2020 UA	0.000297 AU (44,400 km; 27,600 mi)	0.116	5.5–12	28.4	—	data · 2020 UA
2020-10-21	2020-10-17	2020 UY	0.002347 AU (351,100 km; 218,200 mi)	0.913	4.2–9.4	29.0	—	data · 2020 UY
2020-10-22	2020-10-21	2020 UO_{3}	0.002343 AU (350,500 km; 217,800 mi)	0.912	6.0–13	28.2	✓	data · 2020 UO_{3}
2020-10-22	2020-10-21	2020 UF_{3}	0.000289 AU (43,200 km; 26,900 mi)	0.112	5.6–13	28.4	—	data · 2020 UF_{3}
2020-11-02	2020-11-05	2020 VW	0.001480 AU (221,400 km; 137,600 mi)	0.576	5.7–13	28.4	—	data · 2020 VW
2020-11-06	2020-11-10	2020 VO_{1}	0.001158 AU (173,200 km; 107,600 mi)	0.451	6.7–15	28.0	—	data · 2020 VO_{1}
2020-11-09	2020-11-09	2020 VR_{1}	0.002540 AU (380,000 km; 236,100 mi)	0.989	4.3–9.7	28.9	—	data · 2020 VR_{1}
2020-11-11	2020-11-10	2020 VP_{1}	0.001225 AU (183,300 km; 113,900 mi)	0.477	7.8–17	27.7	✓	data · 2020 VP_{1}
2020-11-13	2020-11-14	2020 VT4	0.000045 AU (6,700 km; 4,200 mi) (Note: As of February 2025, the closest approach ever observed without atmospheric contact)	0.018	4.3–9.7	28.6	—	data · 2020 VT_{4}
2020-11-13	2020-11-13	2020 VH_{5}	0.001691 AU (253,000 km; 157,200 mi)	0.658	3.8–8.5	29.2	—	data · 2020 VH_{5}
2020-11-24	2020-11-25	2020 WY_{4}	0.000746 AU (111,600 km; 69,300 mi)	0.290	4.4–9.9	28.9	—	data · 2020 WY_{4}
2020-11-26	2020-11-27	2020 WG_{5}	0.002416 AU (361,400 km; 224,600 mi)	0.940	7.5–17	27.8	—	data · 2020 WG_{5}
2020-11-26	2020-11-27	2020 WF_{5}	0.001345 AU (201,200 km; 125,000 mi)	0.524	7.4–17	27.8	—	data · 2020 WF_{5}
2020-11-30	2020-12-04	2020 XC	0.000810 AU (121,200 km; 75,300 mi)	0.315	4.1–9.2	29.0	✓	data · 2020 XC
2020-12-01	2020-12-04	2020 XE	0.001991 AU (297,800 km; 185,100 mi)	0.775	15–34	26.2	✓	data · 2020 XE
2020-12-03	2020-12-05	2020 XE_{1}	0.002184 AU (326,700 km; 203,000 mi)	0.850	12–27	26.7	✓	data · 2020 XE_{1}
2020-12-03	2020-12-05	2020 XF	0.000593 AU (88,700 km; 55,100 mi)	0.231	11–25	26.8	—	data · 2020 XF
2020-12-03	2020-11-14	2020 VZ_{6}	0.002333 AU (349,000 km; 216,900 mi)	0.908	27–59	25.0	✓	data · 2020 VZ_{6}
2020-12-07	2020-12-07	2020 XK_{1}	0.000139 AU (20,800 km; 12,900 mi)	0.054	2.0–4.5	30.6	—	data · 2020 XK_{1}
2020-12-08	2020-12-07	2020 XG_{2}	0.000327 AU (48,900 km; 30,400 mi)	0.127	7.0–16	27.9	—	data · 2020 XG_{2}
2020-12-16	2020-12-10	2020 XF_{4}	0.002293 AU (343,000 km; 213,100 mi)	0.892	8.1–18	27.6	✓	data · 2020 XF_{4}
2020-12-18	2020-12-10	2020 XX_{3}	0.000381 AU (57,000 km; 35,400 mi)	0.148	5.4–12	28.5	—	data · 2020 XX_{3}
2020-12-19	2020-12-21	2020 YR_{2}	0.001153 AU (172,500 km; 107,200 mi)	0.449	5.8–13	28.3	—	data · 2020 YR_{2}
2020-12-20	2020-12-21	2020 YS_{2}	0.000582 AU (87,100 km; 54,100 mi)	0.226	1.6–3.6	31.1	—	data · 2020 YS_{2}
2020-12-21	2020-12-21	2020 YJ_{2}	0.002292 AU (342,900 km; 213,100 mi)	0.892	9.0–20	27.4	—	data · 2020 YJ_{2}
2020-12-28	2020-12-27	2020 YS_{4}	0.000645 AU (96,500 km; 60,000 mi)	0.251	7.5–17	27.8	—	data · 2020 YS_{4}

=== Warning times by size ===
This sub-section visualises the warning times of the close approaches listed in the above table, depending on the size of the asteroid. It shows the effectiveness of asteroid warning systems at detecting close approaches in 2020. The sizes of the charts show the relative sizes of the asteroids to scale. For comparison, the approximate size of a person is also shown. This is based the absolute magnitude of each asteroid, an approximate measure of size based on brightness.

Absolute magnitude H ≥ 30 (smallest)

Silhouette of man standing and facing forward

(size of a person for comparison)

Absolute magnitude 30 > H ≥ 29

Absolute magnitude 29 > H ≥ 28

Absolute magnitude 28 > H ≥ 27

Absolute magnitude 27 > H ≥ 26

Absolute magnitude 36 > H ≥ 25

Absolute magnitude 25 > H (largest)

- After closest approach: 1 (100.0%)
- < 24 hours before: 0 (0.0%)
- up to 7 days before: 0 (0.0%)
- > one week before: 0 (0.0%)
- > 7 weeks before: 0 (0.0%)
- > one year before: 0 (0.0%)

=== Predicted close approaches ===
Below is the list of predicted close approaches of near-Earth asteroids larger than magnitude 27, that were predicted to occur in 2020. This relates to asteroid cataloging systems effectiveness at predicting close approaches in 2020.

For asteroids which were observed but not predicted, see the main list above. In 2020, at the outset of the year, no asteroids were predicted to pass within 1 lunar distance of Earth. Table omitted.

== Additional examples ==
Radar image of 2020 BX12 and its satellite during close approach in February 2020

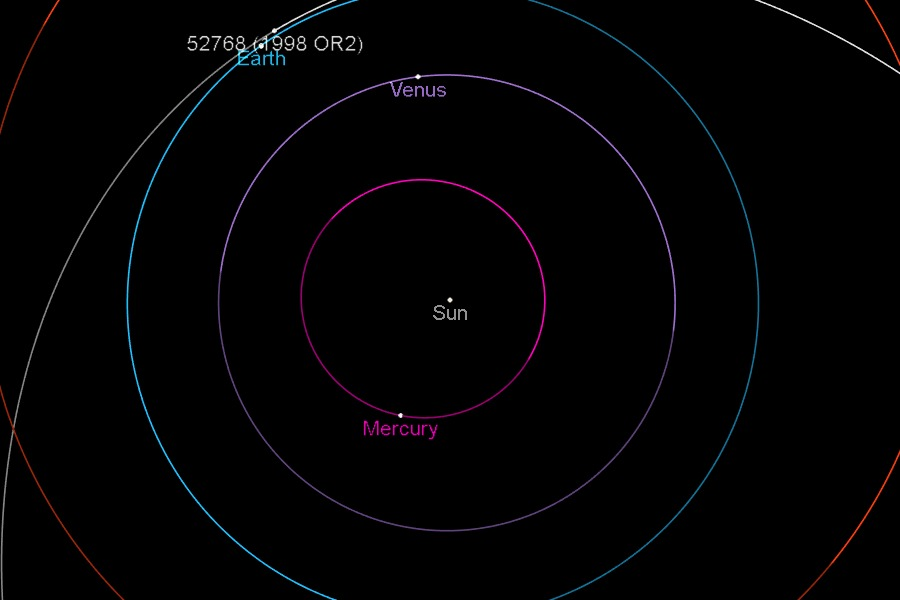
Path of 1998 OR_{2} near close approach to Earth in April 2020

An example list of near-Earth asteroids that passed or will pass more than 1 lunar distance (384,400 km or 0.00256 AU) from Earth in 2020.

Object	Size (meters)	Nearest approach (lunar distances)	Date	Ref
2020 BX12	165	11.34	2020-02-03	JPL · CAD
(163373) 2002 PZ_{39}	700	15.02	2020-02-15	JPL · CAD
(52768) 1998 OR2	1,750	16.36	2020-04-29	JPL · CAD
(388945) 2008 TZ_{3}	350	7.27	2020-05-10	JPL · CAD
(136795) 1997 BQ	1,000	16.02	2020-05-21	JPL · CAD
Planet Venus (Note: For comparison)	—	112.3	2020-06-03	JPL
(163348) 2002 NN4	613	13.25	2020-06-06	JPL · CAD
2013 XA_{22}	115	7.62	2020-06-08	JPL · CAD
(441987) 2010 NY_{65}	228	9.78	2020-06-24	JPL · CAD
(8014) 1990 MF	700	21.28	2020-07-23	JPL · CAD
2011 ES4	35	3.85	2020-09-02	JPL · CAD
2014 RC	22	38.58	2020-09-22	JPL · CAD
(159402) 1999 AP_{10}	2,600	31.39	2020-10-19	JPL · CAD
2020 VV	12	8.37	2020-10-21	JPL · CAD
2018 VP1	2-4	1.09+1.07 −11.06 (Note: 2018 VP_{1} could potentially pass less than 1 lunar distance to Earth, but the chances are fairly low and as such it was not listed in the main table unless followup observations confirm that it will pass less than 1 LD from Earth. A longer observation arc is required to constrain the orbit better. The Earth approach distance has an uncertainty of about 4 million km, ±3 days, and a 1:240 chance of impacting Earth.)	2020-11-02	JPL · CAD
(7753) 1988 XB	800	25.76	2020-11-22	JPL · CAD
(153201) 2000 WO107	600	11.19	2020-11-29	JPL · CAD
(501647) 2014 SD224	150	7.86	2020-12-25	JPL · CAD
162173 Ryugu	865	23.56	2020-12-29	JPL · CAD

== See also ==
- List of asteroid close approaches to Earth
- List of asteroid close approaches to Earth in 2019
- List of asteroid close approaches to Earth in 2021
- Asteroid impact prediction
