= Brashear (lunar crater) =

Lunar surface depression

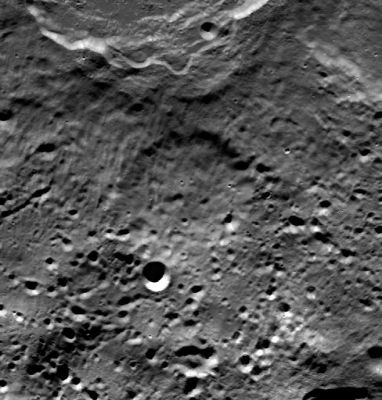
- Clementine photo
- Coordinates: 73.5°S 171.6°W
- Diameter: 60.16 km (37.38 mi)
- Colongitude: 174° at sunrise
- Eponym: John A. Brashear

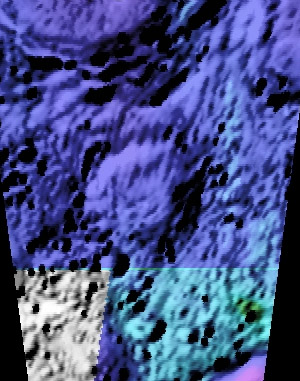
Colorful topography of Brashear from the USGS digital atlas

Brashear is a lunar impact crater on the far side of the Moon, in the southern hemisphere in the vicinity of the south pole. It lies just to the south of the walled plain designated Antoniadi, within the larger crater's outer rampart of ejecta. To the northeast besides Antoniadi is the crater Numerov, and southeast lies the younger De Forest.

This formation is little more than a shallow depression in the lunar surface, its features eroded and blanketed by the ejecta from the relatively fresh crater Antoniadi just to the north.

The satellite crater Brashear P lies to the south-southwest. It is a heavily worn crater with features that have been almost completely worn away by subsequent impacts. Connected to the southern rim of this crater is a series of valleys and impact craters leading a couple of hundred kilometres to the east.

This crater is named after the American astronomer John A. Brashear (1840–1920). Its designation was formally adopted by the International Astronomical Union in 1970.

== Satellite craters ==
By convention these features are identified on lunar maps by placing the letter on the side of the crater midpoint that is closest to Brashear.

Brashear	Latitude	Longitude	Diameter
P	76.8° S	175.7° W	71 km
