= 2020 CW =

Near-Earth asteroid

Discovery
- Discovered by: MLS
- Discovery site: Mount Lemon Obs.
- Discovery date: 1 February 2020 (first observed only)

Designations
- Minor planet category: NEO · Apollo

Orbital characteristics
- Epoch 1 February 2020 (JD 2458880.5)
- Uncertainty parameter 8 · —
- Observation arc: 0 day
- Aphelion: 1.9980 AU
- Perihelion: 0.4769 AU
- Semi-major axis: 1.2375 AU
- Eccentricity: 0.6146
- Orbital period (sidereal): 1.38 yr (503 d)
- Mean anomaly: 322.21°
- Mean motion: 0° 42^{m} 57.6^{s} / day
- Inclination: 2.1259°
- Longitude of ascending node: 132.01°
- Argument of perihelion: 110.66°
- Earth MOID: 0.030 LD (0.000076 AU)

Physical characteristics
- Mean diameter: 1.1 m (est at 0.14)
- Absolute magnitude (H): 32.5 32.6

2020 CW is a tiny near-Earth asteroid of the Apollo group, approximately 1 meter (3 ft) in diameter. It was first observed by the Mount Lemmon Survey on 1 February 2020, when it passed Earth very closely at a nominal distance of only 0.041 lunar distances (0.000105 astronomical units). The object's orbital elements remain highly uncertain.

== Description ==
2020 CW passed within 15,660 kilometres (9,730 mi) of the Earth on 1 February 2020, with a fly-by speed of 21.2 kilometres (13.2 mi) per second. The household-appliance-sized asteroid passed within the orbit of satellites in the geostationary ring at 35,900 kilometres (22,300 mi) above Earth's equator. At the time, it was the closest approach in the year 2020. Since then, 2020 JJ made a closer approach on 4 May 2020.

The asteroid was first observed 1 February 2020 by the Mount Lemmon Survey at Mount Lemmon Observatory in the Santa Catalina Mountains northeast of Tucson, Arizona. The next encounter closer than the Moon is predicted to occur 5 February 2029 at a distance of 19,040 kilometres (11,830 mi) or more.
