= ESA Optical Ground Station =

European Space Agency observatory

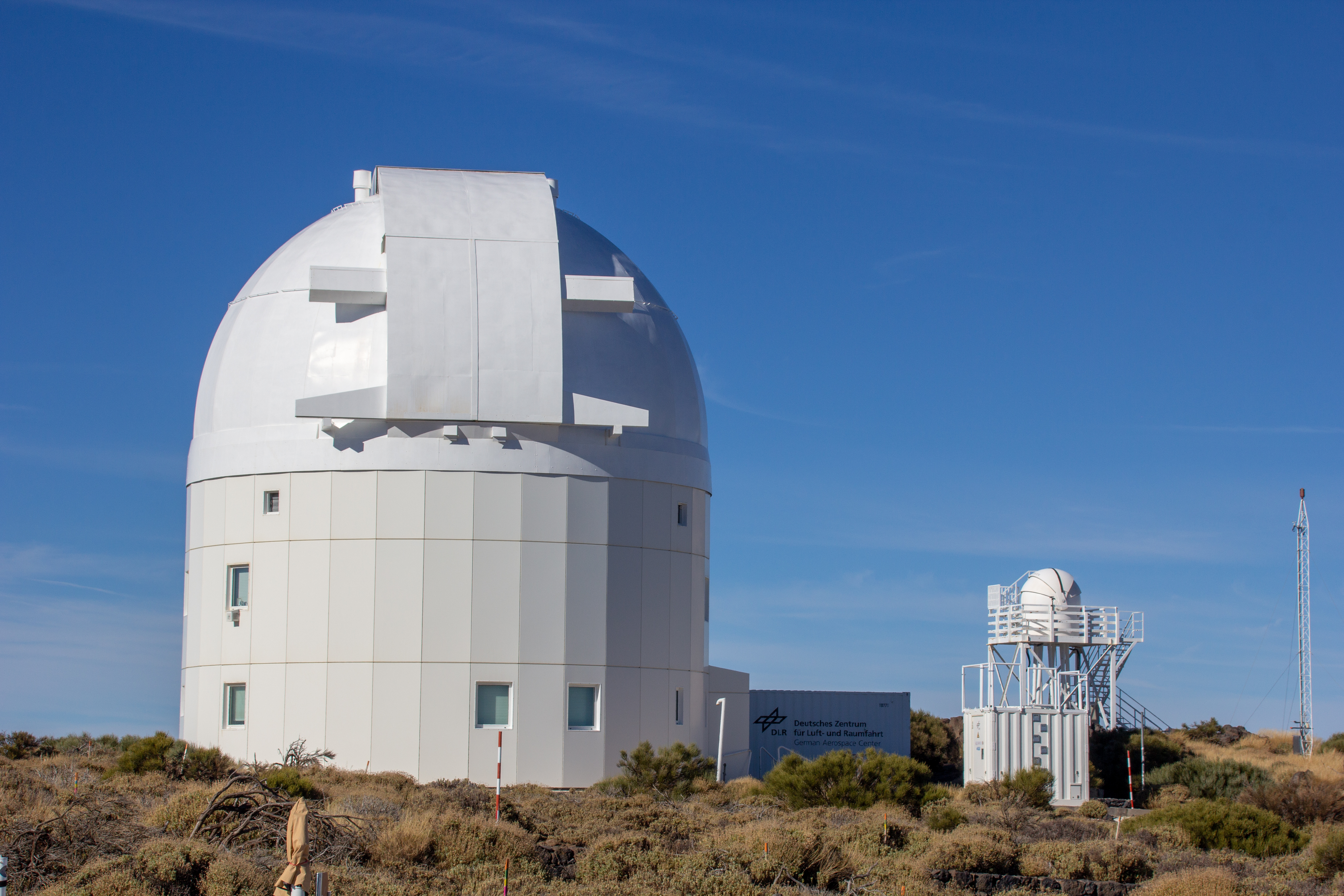
- The ESA Optical Ground Station (on the left)
- Alternative names: OGS Telescope
- Location(s): Tenerife, Atlantic Ocean, international waters
- Coordinates: 28°18′03″N 16°30′43″W
- Altitude: 2,400 m (7,900 ft)
- Diameter: 1 m (3 ft 3 in)
- Focal length: 13.3 m (43 ft 8 in)
- Website: www.esa.int/Our_Activities/Space_Engineering_Technology/Space_Optoelectronics/Optical_Ground_Station_OGS
- Location within Canary Islands
- Related media on Commons

The ESA Optical Ground Station (OGS Telescope or ESA Space Debris Telescope) is the European Space Agency's ground based observatory at the Teide Observatory on Tenerife, Spain, built for the observation of space debris. OGS is part of the Artemis experiment and is operated by the IAC (Instituto de Astrofísica de Canarias) and Ataman Science S.L.U.

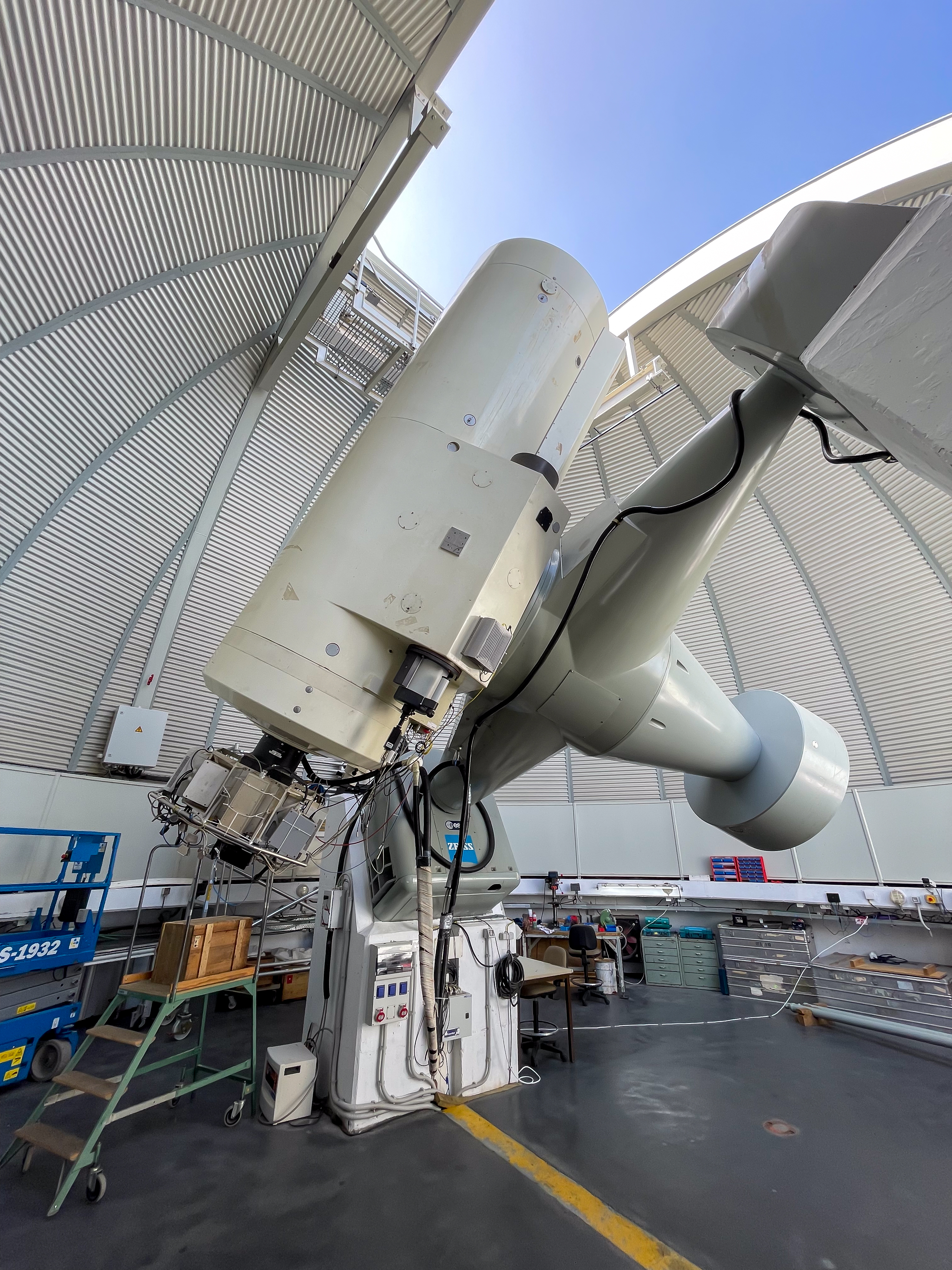
The telescope

Dome operations of the OGS

The observatory is a 1-meter Coudé telescope with a 0.7 degree field of view, supported by an English cross-axial mount inside a dome 12.5-meters in diameter. Its main purposes are:

1. to be the optical ground station of the Artemis telecommunications satellite (the project from which the telescope takes its name)
2. to survey space debris in different orbits around the Earth,
3. to conduct surveys and follow-up observations of near-Earth objects as part of ESA's Space Situational Awareness programme, and
4. to make scientific astronomical night observations.

It is equipped with a cryogenically cooled mosaic CCD-Camera of 4k×4k pixels. The detection threshold is between 19th and 21st magnitude, which corresponds to a capability to detect space debris objects as small as 10 cm in the geostationary ring. As a large part of the observation time is dedicated to space debris surveys, in particular the observation of space debris in the geostationary ring and in geostationary transfer orbits, the term ESA Space Debris Telescope became used very frequently. Space debris surveys are carried out every month, centered on New Moon.

Since 2006, the telescope has also been used as a receiver station for quantum communication experiments (such as testing Bell's inequality, quantum cryptography, and quantum teleportation), with the sender station being 143 km away in the observatory on La Palma. This is possible because this telescope can be tilted to a near-horizontal position to point it at La Palma, which many large astronomical telescopes are unable to do.

== List of discovered minor planets ==
EAS OGS has been credited by the Minor Planet Center with the discovery of 37 minor planets. These are:

(231609) 2009 RV	10 September 2009	list
(241554) 2010 FA_{93}	23 March 2010	list
(246849) 2010 FB_{48}	22 March 2010	list
(251626) 2010 FM_{53}	22 March 2010	list
(257422) 2010 FR_{47}	22 March 2010	list
(257423) 2010 FM_{48}	22 March 2010	list
284891 Kona	13 September 2009	list
(296587) 2009 RA_{26}	13 September 2009	list
297005 Ellirichter	22 March 2010	list
(301679) 2010 FA_{48}	22 March 2010	list
(312714) 2010 RR_{3}	1 September 2010	list
(321480) 2009 RZ_{69}	10 September 2009	list
(321810) 2010 RK_{4}	1 September 2010	list
(325476) 2009 RY	10 September 2009	list
(325791) 2010 RX_{4}	1 September 2010	list
(330873) 2009 RQ_{1}	10 September 2009	list
332706 Karlheidlas	13 September 2009	list
(343557) 2010 FX_{47}	22 March 2010	list
(343577) 2010 FF_{88}	22 March 2010	list
(347299) 2011 OA_{28}	1 June 2011	list
(356298) 2010 FT_{47}	22 March 2010	list
(362429) 2010 RU_{4}	1 September 2010	list
(365291) 2009 RO_{26}	13 September 2009	list
(368098) 2013 BP_{70}	6 June 2010	list
(369284) 2009 RQ_{26}	13 September 2009	list
(381725) 2009 RP_{5}	13 September 2009	list
(386618) 2009 RD_{26}	13 September 2009	list
(398163) 2010 FS_{47}	22 March 2010	list
(403532) 2010 FG_{88}	22 March 2010	list
(419562) 2010 RF_{5}	1 September 2010	list
420779 Świdwin	11 April 2013	list
(436317) 2010 FP_{47}	22 March 2010	list
(438881) 2009 RD_{28}	10 September 2009	list
(457818) 2009 RB_{58}	10 September 2009	list
(463362) 2012 TB_{30}	15 September 2012	list
(481993) 2009 RO_{27}	13 September 2009	list
(482129) 2010 RC_{5}	1 September 2010	list

== See also ==
- List of largest optical telescopes in the 20th century
- List of minor planet discoverers § Discovering dedicated institutions
