= Schumann–Runge bands =

Set of absorption bands of molecular oxygen

The Schumann–Runge bands are a set of absorption bands of molecular oxygen that occur at wavelengths between 176 and 192.6 nanometres. The bands are named for Victor Schumann and Carl Runge.

== See also ==
- Triplet oxygen
- Atmospheric chemistry
