= De Forest (crater) =

Lunar impact crater

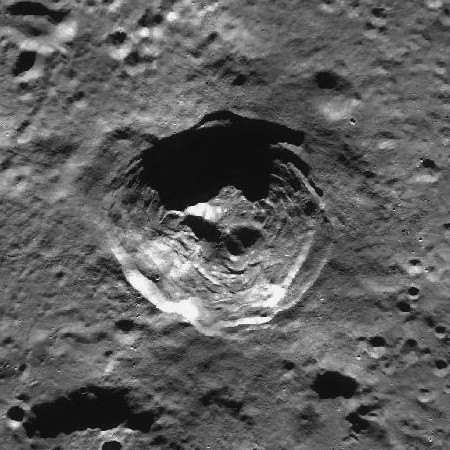
- LRO image
- Coordinates: 77.3°S 162.1°W
- Diameter: 56.26 km (34.96 mi)
- Depth: Unknown
- Colongitude: 167° at sunrise
- Formation: Upper Imbrian
- Eponym: Lee de Forest

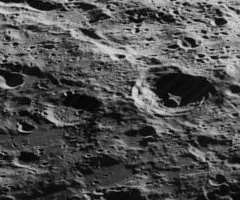
Oblique Lunar Orbiter 5 image facing west, with De Forest at right and De Forest N at left

De Forest is a lunar impact crater on the far side of the Moon. It is located in the deep southern hemisphere, within the best fit impact eclipse of the South Pole-Aitken basin. De Forest liest to the west of the large walled plain designated Zeeman and due north of the larger crater Numerov. Because of its proximity to the southern pole, this crater receives sunlight at an oblique angle when it is on the illuminated half of the Moon.

On the lunar geologic timescale, De Forest dates to the Upper Imbrian period. This is a relatively young formation with features that have not been significantly worn by impacts. The rim is sharp-edged and circular, but somewhat irregular with a small outer rampart. The wide inner wall has multiple terraces, and sections near the rim give the appearance of slumping. At the midpoint of the irregular floor is a relatively large, angular central peak. An impact melt deposit has been detected within the crater, and a ray system has been identified extending outward from the rim.

This crater is named after American inventor Lee de Forest (1873–1961). Its designation was formally adopted by the International Astronomical Union in 1970.

== Satellite craters ==
By convention these features are identified on lunar maps by placing the letter on the side of the crater midpoint that is closest to De Forest.

De Forest	Latitude	Longitude	Diameter
N	79.5° S	164.7° W	41 km
P	80.0° S	176.0° W	18 km
