= 2020 SW =

Small near-Earth asteroid

Discovery
- Discovered by: Mt. Lemmon Survey (Kacper W. Wierzchoś)
- Discovery site: Mt. Lemmon Obs.
- Discovery date: 18 September 2020

Designations
- Alternative designations: C378AD2
- Minor planet category: NEO · Apollo (pre-flyby); Aten (post-flyby)

Orbital characteristics
- Epoch 17 December 2020 (JD 2459200.5)
- Uncertainty parameter 5
- Observation arc: 6 days
- Aphelion: 1.140 AU
- Perihelion: 0.7425 AU
- Semi-major axis: 0.941 AU
- Eccentricity: 0.21118
- Orbital period (sidereal): 0.91 yr
- Mean anomaly: 353.718°
- Mean motion: 1° 4^{m} 45.117^{s} / day
- Inclination: 2.326°
- Longitude of ascending node: 1.808°
- Time of perihelion: 22 December 2020 19:43 UT
- Argument of perihelion: 118.950°
- Earth MOID: 0.00042 AU (63,000 km)

Physical characteristics
- Mean diameter: 4–9 m (assumed albedo 0.05–0.25)
- Synodic rotation period: 0.0079039±0.0000001 h (28.4540±0.0004 s)
- Apparent magnitude: 21.4 (at discovery)
- Absolute magnitude (H): 29.063±0.335; 29.06

2020 SW is a tiny near-Earth asteroid discovered by the Mount Lemmon Survey on 18 September 2020, six days before it made its closest approach to Earth. The asteroid passed within 21,600 kilometres (13,400 mi) from Earth's surface on 24 September 2020 11:13 UT, within the geostationary altitude of 36,000 kilometres (22,000 mi). The encounter with Earth perturbed the asteroid's heliocentric trajectory from an Apollo-type orbit to an Aten-type orbit with a semi-major axis within one astronomical unit from the Sun. As a result, the asteroid will not make any close approaches to Earth within 0.01 astronomical units (4 LD) in the next 200 years.

With an estimated diameter roughly 4–9 metres (13–30 ft) across, 2020 SW is comparable to the size of a small school bus. Had it impacted Earth, it would mostly have disintegrated as a fireball during atmospheric entry and might have left a common strewn field. Extensive observations of its brightness during the close encounter show that it is an elongated body with a rapid rotation period of 28.5 seconds.

== Discovery ==
2020 SW was discovered on 18 September 2020 by the Mount Lemmon Survey under astronomer Kacper W. Wierzchoś, stationed at the Mount Lemmon Observatory in Tucson, Arizona. The asteroid was first observed in the constellation Pegasus at an apparent magnitude of 21.4. It was moving at an on-sky rate of 1.41 arcseconds per minute, from a distance of 0.02 AU (3 million km; 2 million mi) from Earth.

The asteroid was subsequently listed on the Minor Planet Center's Near-Earth Object Confirmation Page (NEOCP) as C378AD2. Follow-up observations were carried out by four other observatories including Pan-STARRS 1 (F51) and the Catalina Sky Survey (V06). Within one day after the asteroid's discovery, the listing was confirmed and publicly announced as 2020 SW on 19 September 2020.

== Orbit and classification ==
2020 SW is currently on an Earth-crossing Aten-type orbit with an orbital semi-major axis of 0.941 AU and an orbital period of 0.91 years. With a nominal perihelion distance of 0.743 AU and an aphelion distance of 1.140 AU, 2020 SW's orbit extends from Venus to Earth, resulting in occasional close passes with these planets. The nominal minimum orbit intersection distances (MOID) with Venus and Earth are approximately 0.02421 AU (3,622,000 km; 2,250,000 mi) and 0.00042 AU (63,000 km; 39,000 mi), respectively. 2020 SW has an orbital eccentricity of 0.211 and an inclination of 2.3 degrees to the ecliptic.

Before the Earth encounter on 18 September 2020, 2020 SW had a more distant Apollo-type orbit crossing the path of Earth. It had a perihelion distance of 0.822 AU and a semi-major axis of 1.015 AU, with an orbital period of 1.02 years. The orbit had an orbital eccentricity of 0.190 and an inclination of 4.2 degrees to the ecliptic.

Orbital Elements
| Parameter | Epoch | Period (p) | Aphelion (Q) | Perihelion (q) | Semi-major axis (a) | Eccentricity (e) | Inclination (i) |
| Units | | (days) | AU | | | | (°) |
|---|---|---|---|---|---|---|---|
| Pre-flyby | 2020-May-31 | 373.5 | 1.208 | 0.822 | 1.015 | 0.1902 | 4.212° |
| Post-flyby | 2020-Dec-17 | 333.6 | 1.140 | 0.743 | 0.941 | 0.2112 | 2.326° |

== Physical characteristics ==
=== Albedo and diameter ===
Based on a magnitude-to-diameter conversion and a measured absolute magnitude of 29.06, 2020 SW measures between 4 and 9 metres in diameter for an assumed geometric albedo of 0.25 and 0.05, respectively. Given its small size, 2020 SW can be compared to a small school bus. It is too small to pose any threat to Earth and its nominal orbit is not known to be on an impact trajectory with the planet. Even had it impacted Earth, it would mostly have disintegrated as a fireball during atmospheric entry and might have left a common strewn field.

=== Shape and rotation ===
The 2020 SW close encounter with Earth provided an opportunity for astronomers to take detailed measurements of its light curve to determine the asteroid's rough shape and rotation period. On 24 September 2020, within 10 hours before closest approach to Earth, 2020 SW was continually observed by astronomer Peter Birtwhistle at the Great Shefford Observatory (J95) for 2 hours and 51 minutes. He derived a period of 0.0079039±0.0000001 h (28.4540±0.0004 s) and a light curve amplitude of 0.73, indicating an elongated shape with a minimum a/b ellipsoid aspect ratio of 1.6. Earlier independent observations of 2020 SW by astronomers at the Northolt Branch Observatories produced similar measurements of the asteroid's light curve, providing a period of 0.00790±0.00001 h (28.44±0.04 s) and an amplitude of 0.72.

== See also ==
- List of asteroid close approaches to Earth in 2020
- List of fast rotators (minor planets)
  - 2010 JL88
  - 2012 TC4
  - 2014 RC
  - 2016 DV1
