= Antoniadi (lunar crater) =

Lunar surface depression

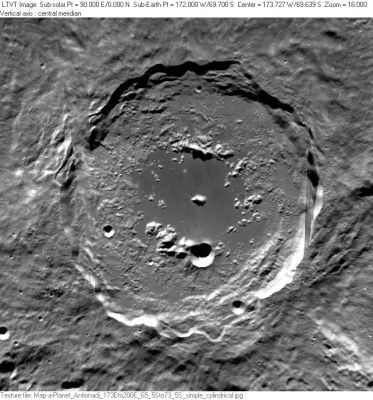
- Clementine image
- Coordinates: 69.7°S 172.0°W
- Diameter: 137.92 km (85.70 mi)
- Depth: 9 km (5.6 mi)
- Colongitude: 172° at sunrise
- Formation: Late Imbrian
- Eponym: Eugène M. Antoniadi

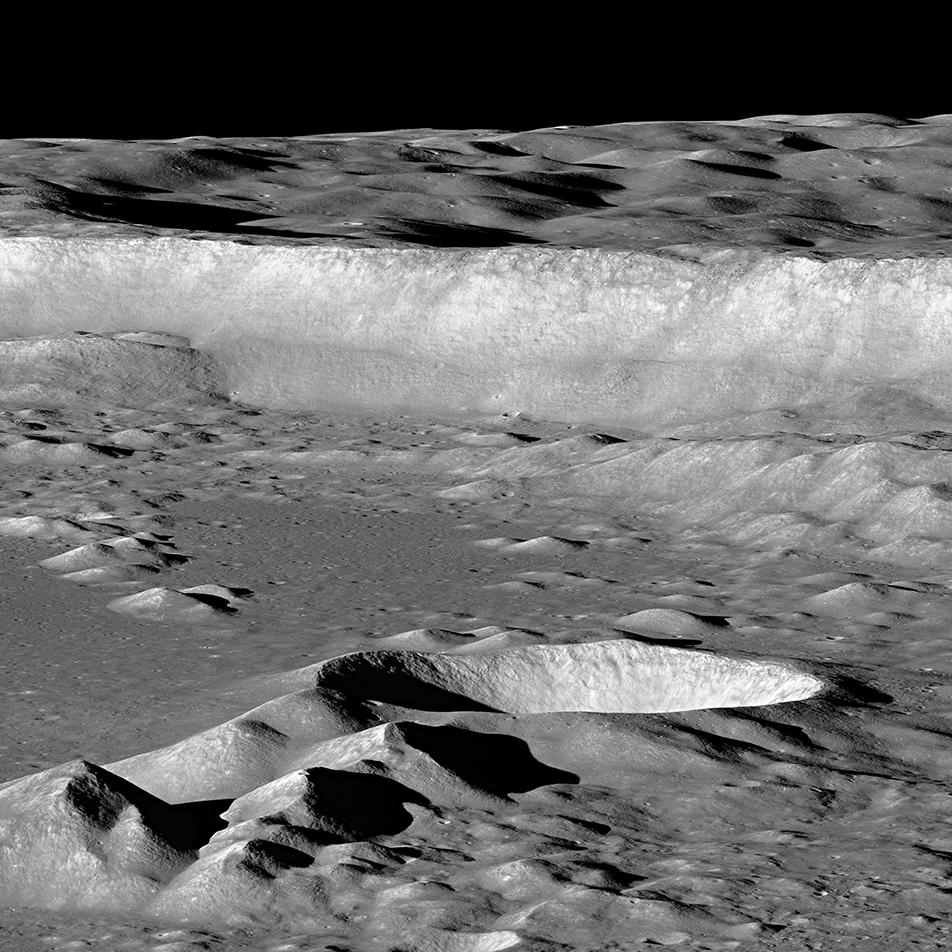
Oblique view of part of the interior of Antoniadi from LRO. The smaller crater near the center of the image contains the lowest point on the moon.

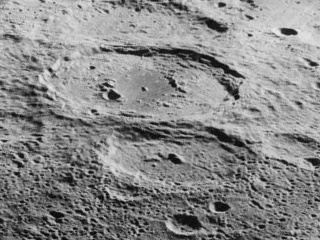
Oblique Lunar Orbiter 5 image facing west of Antoniadi (above center) and Numerov (below center)

Antoniadi is a large lunar impact crater that lies on the southern hemisphere on the far side of the Moon. It is located within the South Pole–Aitken basin. The crater intrudes into the southeastern rim of the crater Minnaert, a slightly smaller formation that is significantly more eroded. Attached to the eastern rim of Antoniadi is Numerov, another large, ancient crater similar to Minnaert. Due south of Antoniadi is the small crater Brashear.

This crater is named after Greek-French astronomer Eugène M. Antoniadi (1870–1944). Its designation was formally adopted by the International Astronomical Union in 1970.

== Geography ==
Antoniadi is one of the largest craters of Upper (Late) Imbrian age. The outer rim of Antoniadi is generally circular, with an irregular edge that has multiple indentations all about the perimeter. The wall is only lightly eroded, and retains a crisp rim and terracing on the inner walls. Only a single small craterlet of note lies across the interior wall, near the southeast edge of the rim.

Antoniadi is one of the few craters on the Moon that possesses both a second inner ring and a central peak. This inner ring formation is about half the diameter of the outer wall, and only rugged mountain segments of the ring to the north and south still remain. The western part of the inner ring is almost non-existent, and only a few minor hills remain to the east. The spectra of the central peak fits an olivine-bearing norite mineralogy, which originated from a depth of 14.3 to 23.6 km.

The floor within the inner wall is unusually flat and smooth, with the central peak being the only notable feature. The floor outside the inner ring is much rougher in texture. The most notable crater on the interior floor lies across the eastern edge of the southern inner ring range.

The impact that created this basin excavated the South Pole–Aitken basin to depths of up to 9 km. The distribution of secondary craters indicates the impactor reached the surface at an oblique angle. The mare deposits in the crater suggest basaltic flows dated 2.6 and 1.6 billion years ago, with the latter occurring around the center. Volcanic cones have been found on this surface.

=== Lowest point on the Moon ===
First measured by the laser altimeter (LALT) instrument on board the Japanese Selenological and Engineering Explorer (SELENE) satellite, the bottom of a crater within Antoniadi crater was measured to be the lowest point on the Moon, at Lunar latitude 70.43° S, longitude 187.42° E. The point is 9.178 km below the average lunar geoid. This measurement was confirmed by laser altimetry data from the Chang'e 1 orbiter, which further refined the location to latitude 70.368° S, longitude 172.413° W.

The lowest point has been unofficially named "Point Trieste" after the Bathyscaphe Trieste, the first vehicle to descend to the Earth's deepest point.
