= Lyman Laboratory of Physics =

Physics laboratory at Harvard University

Coordinates: 42.37753°N 71.11713°W

The Lyman Laboratory of Physics (named for the physicist Theodore Lyman) is a building at Harvard University located between the Jefferson and Cruft Laboratories in the North Yard. It was built in the early 1930s, to a design by Coolidge, Shepley, Bulfinch and Abbott

Among those who have done research at Lyman are Sheldon Glashow, Higgins Professor of Physics, Emeritus and Richard Wilson, Mallinckrodt Professor of Physics, Emeritus. Here, Ranga P. Dias (Post-Doctoral Fellow) and Isaac F. Silvera (Thomas D. Cabot Professor of the Natural Sciences) claim to have gathered experimental evidence that solid metallic hydrogen had been synthesised.
