= 2020 OY4 =

Near-Earth asteroid

2020 OY_{4}
Discovery
- Discovered by: MLS
- Discovery site: Mount Lemmon Obs.
- Discovery date: July 26, 2020

Designations
- Minor planet category: NEO · Apollo

Orbital characteristics
- Epoch 31 May 2020 (JD 2459000.5)
- Uncertainty parameter 6 · 7
- Observation arc: 2 days
- Aphelion: 1.5623 AU
- Perihelion: 0.6873 AU
- Semi-major axis: 1.1248 AU
- Eccentricity: 0.3889
- Orbital period (sidereal): 1.19 yr (436 d)
- Mean anomaly: 257.94°
- Mean motion: 0° 49^{m} 34.32^{s} / day
- Inclination: 2.1148°
- Longitude of ascending node: 305.50°
- Argument of perihelion: 98.703°
- Earth MOID: 0.0000879 AU (0.034 LD)

Physical characteristics
- Mean diameter: 2–5 m
- Absolute magnitude (H): 30.18; 30.35

2020 OY_{4} is a very small asteroid classified as a near-Earth object that passed within 21,850 miles (35,160 km) of the surface of Earth on July 28, 2020, with a fly-by speed of 12.4 kilometres (7.7 mi) per second. The car-sized asteroid posed no risk of impact to Earth, but it did pass within the orbit of satellites in the geostationary ring at 35,785 kilometres (22,236 mi) above Earth's equator.

The asteroid was discovered July 26, 2020 using the Mount Lemmon Survey telescope in the Santa Catalina Mountains northeast of Tucson, Arizona. The next encounter closer than the Moon is predicted to occur July 30, 2055 at a distance of 200,000 kilometres (124,000 mi) or more.
