= 1206 Numerowia =

Main-belt asteroid

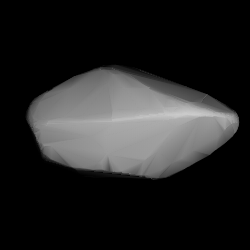
- Shape model of Numerowia from its lightcurve

Discovery
- Discovered by: K. Reinmuth
- Discovery site: Heidelberg Obs.
- Discovery date: 18 October 1931

Designations
- Named after: Boris Numerov (Russian astronomer)
- Alternative designations: 1931 UH · 1974 QE; 1974 TY_{1}
- Minor planet category: main-belt · (outer)

Orbital characteristics
- Epoch 4 September 2017 (JD 2458000.5)
- Uncertainty parameter 0
- Observation arc: 85.63 yr (31,276 days)
- Aphelion: 3.0180 AU
- Perihelion: 2.7123 AU
- Semi-major axis: 2.8651 AU
- Eccentricity: 0.0533
- Orbital period (sidereal): 4.85 yr (1,771 days)
- Mean anomaly: 38.115°
- Mean motion: 0° 12^{m} 11.52^{s} / day
- Inclination: 13.003°
- Longitude of ascending node: 324.44°
- Argument of perihelion: 277.42°

Physical characteristics
- Dimensions: 14.173±0.092 km 14.534±0.264 km 15.63±1.09 km 27.90 km (calculated)
- Synodic rotation period: 4.7743±0.0013 h 4.77529±0.00001 h
- Geometric albedo: 0.057 (assumed); 0.141±0.021; 0.159±0.026; 0.1680±0.0205
- Spectral type: C
- Absolute magnitude (H): 11.5 · 11.80

1206 Numerowia (provisional designation 1931 UH) is an asteroid from the outer region of the asteroid belt, approximately 15 kilometers in diameter. It was discovered by German astronomer Karl Reinmuth at Heidelberg Observatory in southwest Germany on 18 October 1931, and named after Russian astronomer Boris Numerov.

== Orbit and classification ==
Numerowia orbits the Sun in the outer main-belt at a distance of 2.7–3.0 AU once every 4 years and 10 months (1,771 days). Its orbit has an eccentricity of 0.05 and an inclination of 13° with respect to the ecliptic. The asteroid's observation arc begins at Heidelberg four days after its official discovery observation.

== Physical characteristics ==
=== Rotation period and poles ===
In February 2006, a rotational lightcurve of Numerowia was obtained from photometric observations by astronomer Lawrence Molnar and colleges at the Calvin–Rehoboth Observatory in New Mexico, United States. Lightcurve analysis gave a well-defined rotation period of 4.7743 hours with a high brightness variation of 0.63 magnitude (U=3), indicating that the body has a non-spheroidal shape.

A 2016-published lightcurve, using modeled photometric data from the Lowell Photometric Database (LPD), gave a concurring period of 4.77529 hours (U=n.a.), as well as two spin axis of (64.0°, −50.0°) and (271.0°, −69.0°) in ecliptic coordinates (λ, β).

=== Diameter and albedo ===
According to the surveys carried out by the Japanese Akari satellite and the NEOWISE mission of NASA's Wide-field Infrared Survey Explorer, Numerowia measures between 14.173 and 15.63 kilometers in diameter and its surface has an albedo between 0.141 and 0.168.

The Collaborative Asteroid Lightcurve Link assumes a standard albedo for C-type asteroid of 0.057 and consequently calculates a larger diameter of 27.90 kilometers using an absolute magnitude of 11.5.

== Naming ==
This minor planet was named after Russian astronomer and geophysicist Boris Numerov (1891–1941), founder and director of the Institute for Theoretical Astronomy in Leningrad, who was executed for espionage by the Soviet Union in 1941. The accusation was based on the fact that a German had named the asteroid after him. In 1957, his memory was rehabilitated. The lunar crater Numerov was also named in his honour. The official naming citation was published by Paul Herget in The Names of the Minor Planets in 1955 (H 112).
