= (809875) 2020 BX12 =

Binary near-Earth asteroid

(809875) 2020 BX_{12}
- 2020 BX_{12} and its satellite imaged by the Arecibo Observatory in February 2020

Discovery
- Discovered by: ATLAS-MLO
- Discovery site: Mauna Loa Obs.
- Discovery date: 27 January 2020

Designations
- Alternative designations: A10jUnf
- Minor planet category: Apollo · PHA · NEO

Orbital characteristics
- Epoch 31 May 2020 (JD 2459000.5)
- Uncertainty parameter 0
- Observation arc: 6.09 yr (2,224 days)
- Earliest precovery date: 5 January 2014
- Aphelion: 2.4437 AU
- Perihelion: 0.7570 AU
- Semi-major axis: 1.6004 AU
- Eccentricity: 0.75704
- Orbital period (sidereal): 2.02 yr (739.5 d)
- Mean anomaly: 34.442°
- Mean motion: 0° 29^{m} 12.545^{s} / day
- Inclination: 40.067°
- Longitude of ascending node: 132.904°
- Argument of perihelion: 70.492°
- Known satellites: 1
- Earth MOID: 0.002061 AU

Physical characteristics
- Mean diameter: 205±65 m
- Mass: 7×10^{8} to 3×10^{10} kg (system) (Note: Combined mass of 2020 BX_{12} and its satellite)
- Synodic rotation period: 2.5±0.5 h
- Geometric albedo: 0.3 (assumed for S-type asteroids)
- Spectral type: Q or Sq
- Absolute magnitude (H): 20.631±0.396

(809875) 2020 BX_{12} is a sub-kilometer binary asteroid, classified as a near-Earth asteroid and potentially hazardous object of the Apollo group. It was discovered on 27 January 2020 by the Asteroid Terrestrial-impact Last Alert System survey at the Mauna Loa Observatory during its approach to Earth of 0.02915 AU (4.361 million km; 11.34 LD). The Arecibo Observatory took radar images of 2020 BX_{12} on 4 February 2020, which led to the discovery of a small natural satellite orbiting 360 m (1,180 ft) away from the asteroid. With a diameter of around 200 m (660 ft), 2020 BX_{12} is among the smallest 10% of known binary asteroids. It was the last binary asteroid discovered by the Arecibo Observatory.

== Discovery ==
2020 BX_{12} was discovered on 27 January 2020 by the Asteroid Terrestrial-impact Last Alert System (ATLAS) survey at the Mauna Loa Observatory in Hawaii. The ATLAS survey was designed for detecting near-Earth asteroids on approach to Earth, particularly those that may be considered potentially hazardous under circumstances where they can approach Earth from close distances. 2020 BX_{12} was identified by a team of astronomers consisting of Larry Denneau, John Tonry, Aren Heinze, and Henry Weiland, who were chiefly involved in the ATLAS project. The asteroid was discovered during its approach to Earth and was at nominal distance of about 0.11 AU (16,000,000 km; 10,000,000 mi) from the planet. At the time of discovery, 2020 BX_{12} was located in the constellation of Puppis at an apparent magnitude of 17.6. (Note: The celestial coordinates of 2020 BX_{12} at the time of discovery were 07^{h} 34^{m} 48.39^{s} −38° 14′ 23.2″. See Puppis for constellation coordinates.)

The discovery of 2020 BX_{12} was subsequently reported to the Minor Planet Center's Near-Earth Object Confirmation Page (NEOCP), where a preliminary orbit was calculated from additional observations conducted at multiple observatories. Follow-up observations of 2020 BX_{12} spanned three days since its discovery, and the asteroid was formally announced in a Minor Planet Electronic Circular issued by the Minor Planet Center on 30 January 2020.

== Nomenclature ==
Upon discovery, the asteroid was given the temporary internal designation A10jUnf. After follow up observations confirming the object, it was then given the provisional designation 2020 BX_{12} by the Minor Planet Center on 30 January 2020. The provisional designation signifies the object's discovery date and year. Once 2020 BX_{12} had a sufficiently long observation arc for its orbit to be accurately determined, the asteroid received the permanent minor planet number 809875 from the Minor Planet Center, making it eligible for naming.

== Orbit and classification ==
2020 BX_{12} orbits the Sun at an average distance of approximately 1.60 astronomical units (0.239×10^{9} km; 0.149×10^{9} mi), taking 2.02 years to complete one full orbit. The orbit of 2020 BX_{12} is highly eccentric and inclined to the ecliptic plane: it has an orbital eccentricity of 0.757 and inclination of 40 degrees, with its orbit extending from 0.76 AU at perihelion to 2.44 AU at aphelion. As it approaches perihelion, 2020 BX_{12} moves above the ecliptic and comes closer to the Sun than Venus, whereas at aphelion, 2020 BX_{12} moves below the ecliptic and recedes from the Sun farther out than the orbit of Mars. The orbit of 2020 BX_{12} crosses that of Earth; thus it can occasionally make close approaches to Earth, making it a near-Earth object. With a semi-major axis (average orbit distance) greater than 1 AU and a perihelion distance within that of Earth, 2020 BX_{12} is formally classified under the Apollo group of near-Earth asteroids.

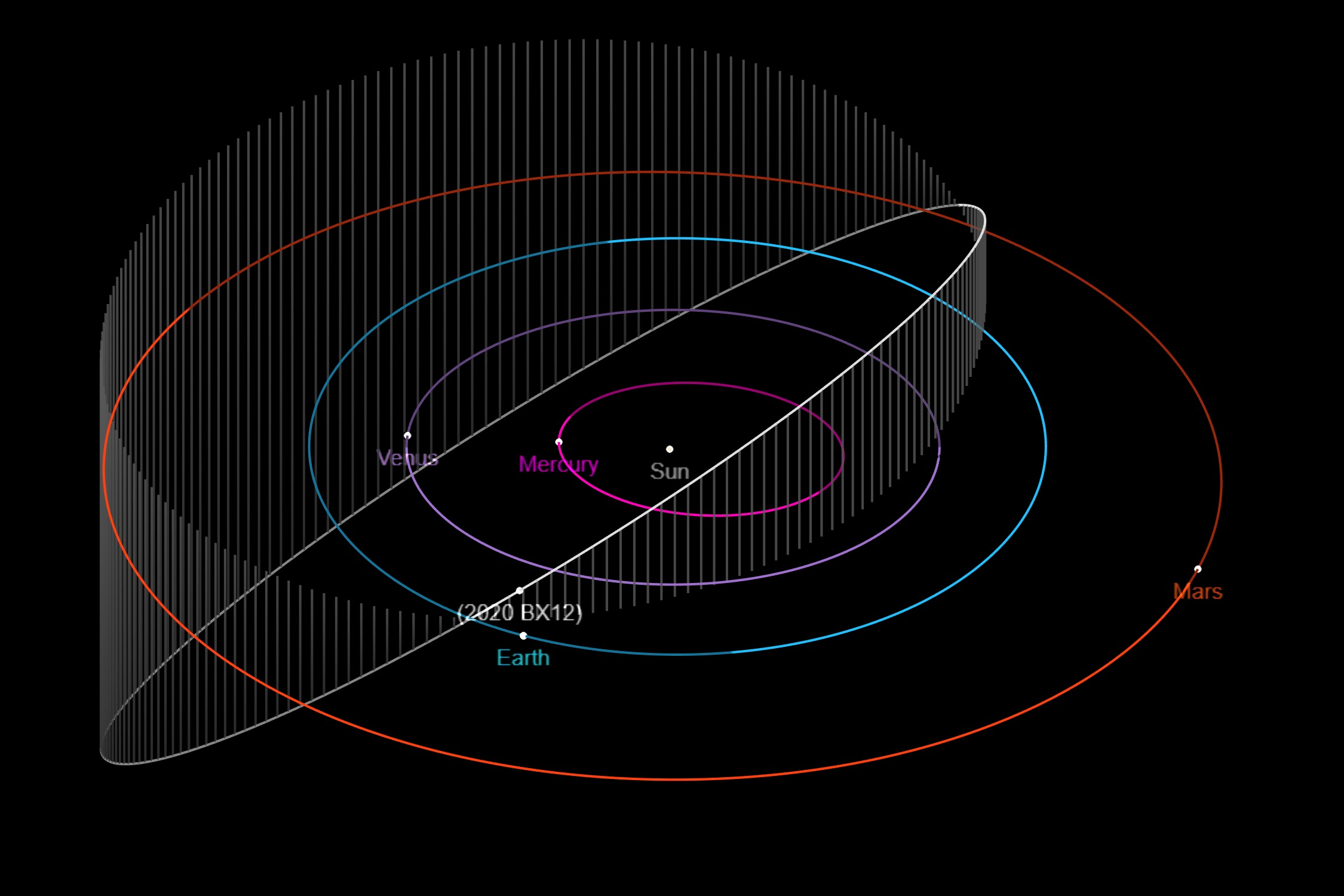
Side view of 2020 BX_{12}'s inclined orbit

The asteroid's minimum orbital intersection distance (MOID) from Earth is approximately 0.002 AU (0.30 million km; 0.19 million mi), or about 0.78 lunar distances. Having such a small Earth MOID, 2020 BX_{12} is considered a potentially hazardous asteroid (PHA) by the Minor Planet Center, under the definition that PHAs have Earth MOIDs less than 0.05 AU and absolute magnitudes under 22. Despite this, 2020 BX_{12} will not make any close Earth encounters within 15 lunar distances or 0.04 AU (6.0 million km; 3.7 million mi) over the next 200 years, and the asteroid has not been listed by the JPL Sentry Risk Table as of 2020.

On 12 February 2020, a team of astronomers identified 2020 BX_{12} in several precovery images taken by the Pan-STARRS 1 survey, with the earliest images dating back to 5 January 2014. The observation arc of these precovery images spanned over six years, long enough for astronomers to refine and calculate 2020 BX_{12}'s orbit with accuracy. This greatly reduced uncertainties in the asteroid's orbit, reducing its uncertainty parameter from 8 to 1. As of February 2020 the observation arc of 2020 BX_{12} spans 6.09 years or 2,224 days, with an orbit uncertainty parameter of 0 according to the JPL Small-Body Database.

=== 2020 Earth approach ===
On 3 February 2020 at 18:56 UTC, 2020 BX_{12} passed 0.02915 AU (4.36 million km; 2.71 million mi), or 11.35 lunar distances, from Earth. During its close approach to Earth, the asteroid approached Earth at a rate of 25.3 km/s (57,000 mph) and its apparent visual brightness peaked around magnitude 15.7, which is too faint to be seen with the naked eye. At closest approach the asteroid's apparent motion in the sky was 1.2 degrees per hour, and it was in the constellation of Cetus, with an apparent magnitude of 16 and an angular separation of 20 degrees from the Moon. (Note: The celestial coordinates of 2020 BX_{12} at 19:00 UTC are 03^{h} 08^{m} 29.788^{s} +05° 03′ 41.65″. See Cetus for constellation coordinates.)

The February 2020 encounter by 2020 BX_{12} provided an opportunity for radar observatories to study the asteroid's characteristics in detail. 2020 BX_{12} was the first radar target observed by the Arecibo Observatory in Puerto Rico since the one-month shutdown of observatory operations due to a series of earthquakes in the southern region of Puerto Rico in December 2019 and January 2020. Radar observations of 2020 BX_{12} were conducted on 4 February 2020 by a team of astronomers led by Luisa Zambrano-Marín. Over a two-day observation period, astronomers measured the asteroid's size, shape, and rotation, and discovered a small satellite.

After the February 2020 encounter, 2020 BX_{12} passed perihelion on 21 March 2020. During its egress from perihelion, the asteroid made its closest approach to Mars on 28 June 2020, at a distance of 0.042 AU (6.3 million km; 3.9 million mi).

=== Future approaches ===
Over the course of its orbit in the next 200 years, 2020 BX_{12} will continue to pass by Earth, though it will not make any approaches as close as the February 2020 encounter that would otherwise warrant attention. The last Earth encounter by 2020 BX_{12} from a closer distance was on 1 February 1931, when the asteroid approached Earth from a distance of 0.009 AU (1.3 million km; 0.84 million mi), or 3.5 lunar distances. An Earth encounter by 2020 BX_{12} occurred in February 2022 and another occurred in 2024, with approach distances of 0.18 AU and 0.34 AU, respectively.

== Physical characteristics ==
High-resolution delay-Doppler radar imaging by the Arecibo Observatory in February 2020 has shown that 2020 BX_{12} is a spheroidal object with a diameter of 205 ± 65 m (670 ± 210 ft). This spheroidal shape is commonly seen in other near-Earth objects, such as (308635) 2005 YU55 and 101955 Bennu. Based on the asteroid's estimated diameter and the bandwidth of radar signals reflected from the asteroid, the rotation period of 2020 BX_{12} is estimated to be between 2 and 3 hours—close to the 2.2-hour spin barrier at which asteroids tend to break apart due to excessive centrifugal forces. Like other binary near-Earth asteroids, the rapid rotation of 2020 BX_{12} suggests that it was sped up by the YORP effect and may have undergone rotational breakup, which led to the formation of its satellite. The axial tilt or direction of 2020 BX_{12}'s rotational pole is unknown and could not be constrained by Arecibo's radar observations, however.

Astronomical spectroscopy by the 10.4-metre (34 ft) Gran Telescopio Canarias in February 2024 has shown that the visible and near-infrared spectrum of 2020 BX_{12} most closely matches those of Q- and Sq-type asteroids, indicating that it is predominantly made of silicate minerals. In particular, 2020 BX_{12} appears reddish in the visible spectrum until the wavelength of 0.7 μm, and exhibits a spectral absorption band from wavelengths of 0.75 to 1.05 μm, indicating the presence of olivine and pyroxene. The silicaceous composition and spectral type of 2020 BX_{12} is commonly seen in near-Earth asteroids. The geometric albedo of 2020 BX_{12} has not been directly measured, but is inferred to be around 0.3 based on its spectral type.

== Satellite ==
Satellite
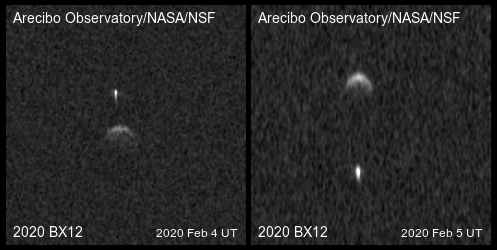
- Two radar images of 2020 BX_{12} and its satellite taken by the Arecibo Observatory in February 2020

Discovery
- Discovered by: Luisa F. Zambrano-Marín et al. Planetary Radar Science Group (Note: The Planetary Radar Science Group's press release page credits the satellite's discovery to Luisa Fernanda Zambrano-Marín, Sean Marshall, Anne Virkki, Dylan Hickson, Anna McGilvray, Johbany Lebron, and Israel Cabrera of the Arecibo Observatory.)
- Discovery site: Arecibo Obs.
- Discovery date: 4 February 2020

Orbital characteristics
- Semi-major axis: >400 m (lower limit)
- Orbital period (sidereal): >40 h (lower limit)
- Satellite of: (809875) 2020 BX_{12}

Physical characteristics
- Mean diameter: 50±25 m
- Synodic rotation period: (likely synchronous) >6 h (lower limit)
- Spectral type: Q or Sq

The satellite of 2020 BX_{12} was discovered in Arecibo radar observations conducted by a team of astronomers consisting of Luisa Zambrano-Marín along with other members of the Planetary Radar Science Group. With the discovery of a satellite around 2020 BX_{12}, the mass and density of the primary body can be determined from the satellite's orbit. The satellite may have formed as a result of rotational fission or mass ejection of the primary body, since 2020 BX_{12} along with other binary near-Earth asteroids have been observed to have rapid rotation periods and spheroidal shapes.

=== Physical characteristics ===
With a diameter of 50 ± 25 m (164 ± 82 ft), the satellite is less than one third of 2020 BX_{12}'s diameter. The satellite's shape is unknown as it was not resolved in Arecibo's radar imagery.

=== Orbit and rotation ===
From radar images taken on 5 February 2020, the separation distance between the satellite and the primary body is estimated to be about 360 m (1,180 ft), or 4.4 times the radius of the 2020 BX_{12} primary. The orbital period of the satellite is thought to be around 45–50 hours, with the best-fit period being 47 hours. However, another possible orbital period of 15–16 hours has not been yet been ruled out, due to projection effects of radar images. Radar observations by Arecibo suggest the satellite is likely tidally locked to the primary body, with its rotation period being synchronous with its orbital period. However, uncertainties remain in measurements of the satellite's rotation period, thus an upper limit to its period was placed at 49 hours.
