= 2020 HS7 =

Near-Earth asteroid

2020 HS_{7}
Discovery
- Discovered by: Pan-STARRS 2
- Discovery site: Haleakala Obs.
- Discovery date: 27 April 2020

Designations
- Minor planet category: NEO · Apollo

Orbital characteristics
- Epoch 9 August 2022 (JD 2459800.5)
- Uncertainty parameter 6
- Observation arc: 1 day
- Aphelion: 2.904 AU
- Perihelion: 0.793 AU
- Semi-major axis: 1.849 AU
- Eccentricity: 0.5709
- Orbital period (sidereal): 2.51 yr (918 days)
- Mean anomaly: 308.988°
- Mean motion: 0° 23^{m} 31.807^{s} / day
- Inclination: 4.732°
- Longitude of ascending node: 38.531°
- Argument of perihelion: 245.692°

Physical characteristics
- Dimensions: a/b ≥ 1.04
- Mean diameter: 4–8 m
- Synodic rotation period: 2.9945±0.0002 s 2.9938±0.0002 s
- Absolute magnitude (H): 29.10±0.36

2020 HS_{7} is a very small asteroid classified as a near-Earth object of the Earth-crossing Apollo group. When it was discovered by the Pan-STARRS 2 survey on 27 April 2020, the asteroid was initially calculated to have a 10% chance of impact with Earth before being ruled out by improved orbit determinations from additional observations. Although there is now no risk of impact with Earth, it did make a close approach 42,700 kilometres (26,500 mi) from Earth on 28 April 2020, with a flyby speed of 15.6 kilometres per second (9.7 mi/s) relative to Earth. The asteroid will not make any close encounters within 1 lunar distance (380,000 km; 240,000 mi) of Earth in the next 100 years.

Observations by Kiso Observatory in Nagano, Japan show that the asteroid rotates extremely rapidly with a rotation period of 3 seconds, making it the fastest-rotating asteroid known as of 2022. No other near-Earth asteroid of similar size is known to have a rotation period shorter than 10 seconds, which could be attributed to the tangential component of the YORP effect accelerating their rotation far beyond this period. The asteroid exhibits a very small light curve amplitude of 0.07 magnitudes, which either implies a nearly spherical shape or a pole-on rotation during observations.

== See also ==
- List of fast rotators (minor planets)
- List of asteroid close approaches to Earth in 2020
