= Boris Numerov =

Russian astronomer

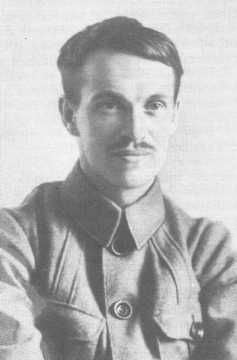
B. V. Numerov

Boris Vasilyevich Numerov (Russian: Борис Васильевич Нумеров; January 29, 1891—September 1941) was a Russian astronomer, land-surveyor and geophysicist. Born in Novgorod and graduated from the St. Petersburg University in 1913, he created various astronomic and mineralogical instruments, as well as various algorithms and methods that bear his name. He was a member of the Academy of Sciences, observer at Pulkovo from 1913 to 1915, astronomer at the observatory of the University of Leningrad from 1915 to 1925, director of the Central Observatory of Geophysics (1926–27), and Professor at the University of Leningrad (1924–1937). He was also the founder and director of the Institute for Theoretical Astronomy in Leningrad.

In 1936, Numerov visited Wallace Eckert's lab to learn how punched-card equipment might be applied to "stellar research" in his own lab at St. Petersburg University.

In October 1936, he was arrested and then sentenced to 10 years hard labour (this was part of "the Pulkovo persecutions", when many astronomers suffered repressions). He had been accused of being a spy in the pay of Germany. The basis of this accusation rested on the fact that German astronomers had named an asteroid after him (also see 1206 Numerowia). It is believed that he was executed along with other political prisoners in September 1941 at the Oryol Prison in Oryol, Russia, before city's surrender to Nazi Germany. In 1957, his memory was rehabilitated.

The lunar crater Numerov and the minor planet 1206 Numerowia, discovered by the German astronomer Karl Reinmuth in Heidelberg in 1931, were named in his honour.
