= Minnaert (crater) =

Lunar surface depression

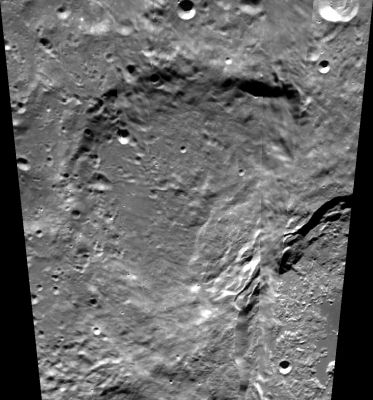
- Clementine mosaic
- Coordinates: 67.8°S 179.6°E
- Diameter: 125 km (78 mi)
- Depth: Unknown
- Colongitude: 185° at sunrise
- Formation: Pre-Nectarian
- Eponym: Marcel Minnaert

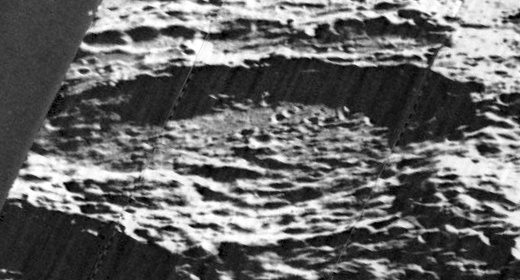
Oblique Lunar Orbiter 5 image

Minnaert is a large lunar impact crater that is located on the far side of the Moon, deep in the southern hemisphere. It is partly overlain along the southeastern side by the larger and younger crater Antoniadi. To the west-northwest lies Lyman.

On the lunar geologic timescale, Minnaert dates to the Pre-Nectarian period. Nearly half the crater is overlain by the rim, outer rampart, and ejecta from Antoniadi. The remaining rim is worn and eroded, with a number of small craterlets along the edge and inner wall. The western interior floor is relatively level, but is marked by ejecta and secondary cratering from Antoniadi. If the crater ever possessed a central ridge, it may now be buried.

== Satellite craters ==
By convention these features are identified on lunar maps by placing the letter on the side of the crater midpoint that is closest to Minnaert.

Minnaert	Latitude	Longitude	Diameter
C	64.2° S	176.0° W	15 km (9.3 mi)
N	71.1° S	176.1° E	33 km (21 mi)
W	63.4° S	174.1° E	24 km (15 mi)
