= Lyman (crater) =

Lunar surface depression

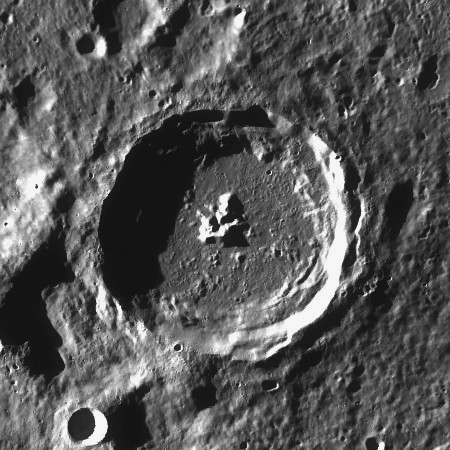
- LRO image
- Coordinates: 64.8°S 163.6°E
- Diameter: 84 km
- Depth: Unknown
- Colongitude: 160° at sunrise
- Eponym: Theodore Lyman

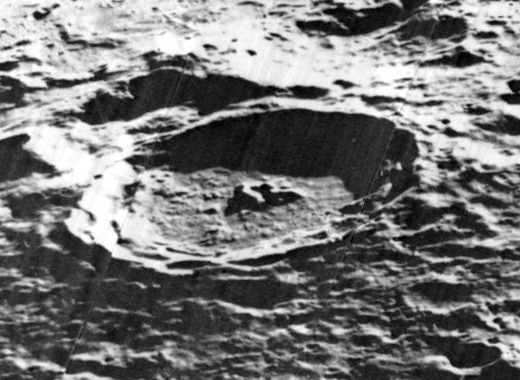
Oblique Lunar Orbiter 5 image, facing west

Lyman is a lunar impact crater that lies in the southern hemisphere on the far side of the Moon. It is located to the south of a huge walled plain named Poincaré, and to the northeast of Schrödinger, another walled plain. To the east-southeast is the larger crater Minnaert.

This formation dates to the Late Imbrian epoch of the lunar geologic timescale. The rim of Lyman has not been significantly worn and has a well-defined edge and interior features that have not been eroded through impacts. The perimeter is roughly circular with outward bulges along the southern and eastern edges where slumping has occurred. Around much of the interior edge the unconsolidated material has collapsed, forming a ring-shaped pile around the edge of the interior floor. There are a few terraces along parts of the inner wall.

The interior floor of Lyman is relatively level with a few minor ridges and a small number of tiny craterlets. At the midpoint of the interior floor is a central peak formation. This consists of a main peak with attached foothills to the north and northeast. This formation of ridges occupies a diameter of over 10,000 kilometers. The spectra of this orthopyroxene-rich peak fits a gabbroic norite mineralogy, which originated from a depth of 8.4 to 13.3 km.

== Satellite craters ==
By convention these features are identified on lunar maps by placing the letter on the side of the crater midpoint that is closest to Lyman.

Lyman	Latitude	Longitude	Diameter
P	67.6° S	158.5° E	14 km
Q	68.6° S	156.7° E	56 km
T	64.1° S	157.7° E	59 km
V	62.6° S	154.2° E	37 km
