= Carl Runge =

German mathematician and physicist

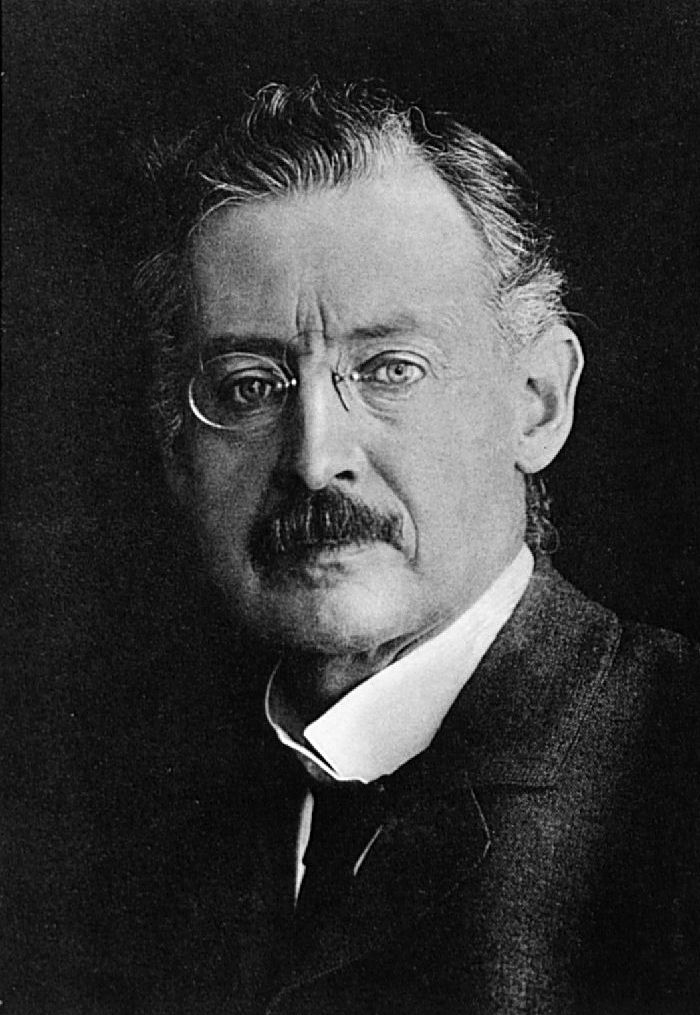
- Carl David Tolmé Runge
- Born: 30 August 1856; Bremen, German Confederation
- Died: 3 January 1927 (aged 70); Göttingen, Weimar Republic
- Citizenship: German
- Education: Berlin University
- Known for: Runge–Kutta method Runge's phenomenon Runge's theorem Laplace–Runge–Lenz vector Schumann–Runge bands
- Scientific career
- Fields: Mathematics; Physics
- Workplaces: Leibniz University Hannover (1886–1904); University of Göttingen (1904–1925)
- Doctoral advisor: Karl Weierstrass; Ernst Kummer
- Doctoral students: Max Born; Friedrich Adolf Willers; Hermann König

Carl David Tolmé Runge (German: [ˈʁʊŋə]; 30 August 1856 – 3 January 1927) was a German mathematician, physicist, and spectroscopist.

He was co-developer and co-eponym of the Runge–Kutta method (German pronunciation: [ˈʀʊŋə ˈkʊta]), in the field of what is today known as numerical analysis.

== Life and work ==
Runge spent the first few years of his life in Havana, where his father Julius Runge was the Danish consul. His mother was Fanny Schwartz Tolmé. The family later moved to Bremen, where his father died early (in 1864).

In 1880, he received his Ph.D. in mathematics at Berlin, where he studied under Karl Weierstrass. In 1886, he became a professor at the Technische Hochschule Hannover in Hanover, Germany.

His interests included mathematics, spectroscopy, geodesy, and astrophysics. In addition to pure mathematics, he did experimental work studying spectral lines of various elements (together with Heinrich Kayser), and was very interested in the application of this work to astronomical spectroscopy.

In 1904, on the initiative of Felix Klein he was offered a position at the University of Göttingen, which he accepted. There he remained until his retirement in 1925.

=== Family ===
His daughter Iris also became a mathematician and his son Wilhelm was an early developer of radar. Another of his daughters, Nerina (Nina), married the mathematician Richard Courant.

== Honors ==
The crater Runge on the Moon is named after him. The Schumann–Runge bands of molecular oxygen are named after him and Victor Schumann.

== See also ==
- Runge's law
- Runge's method for Diophantine equations.
- Runge's theorem for complex analysis

== Works ==
- Ueber die Krümmung, Torsion und geodätische Krümmung der auf einer Fläche gezogenen Curven (PhD dissertation, Friese, 1880)
- Praxis der Gleichungen (G.J. Göschen, Leipzig, 1900)
  - Praxis der Gleichungen, zweite, verbesserte Auflage (W. de Gruyter, Berlin, 1921)
- Analytische Geometrie der Ebene (B.G. Teubner, Leipzig, 1908)
- Graphical methods; a course of lectures delivered in Columbia university, New York, October, 1909, to January, 1910 (Columbia University Press, New York, 1912)
- Graphische Methoden (Teubner, 1912)
  - Graphische Methoden, dritte Auflage (Teubner, 1928)
- Vektoranalysis (S. Hirzel, Leipzig, 1919)
  - Vector Analysis (Methuen & Co., London, 1923); translated from 1919 German original by H. Levy
- Carl Runge und Hermann König: Vorlesungen über numerisches Rechnen (Springer, Heidelberg, 1924)

== Bibliography ==
- Paschen F (1929). "Carl Runge". Astrophysical Journal. 69: 317–321. Bibcode:1929ApJ....69..317P. doi:10.1086/143192.
- Iris Runge: Carl Runge und sein wissenschaftliches Werk, Vandenhoeck & Ruprecht, Göttingen 1949.
