= 2020 JJ =

Small near-Earth asteroid

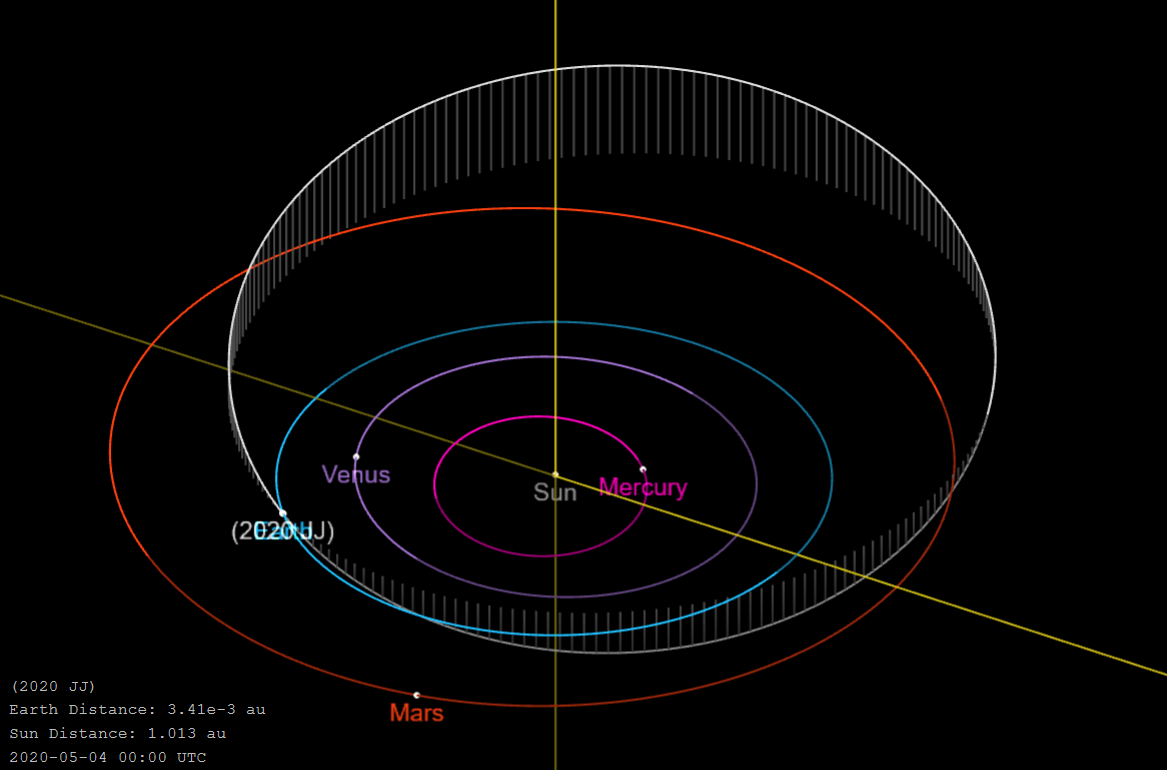
- Orbit of 2020 JJ

Discovery
- Discovered by: Mt. Lemmon Survey
- Discovery site: Mt. Lemmon Obs.
- Discovery date: 4 May 2020

Designations
- Minor planet category: Apollo · NEO

Orbital characteristics
- Epoch 31 May 2020 (JD 2459000.5)
- Uncertainty parameter 7
- Observation arc: 0 day
- Aphelion: 2.1425 AU
- Perihelion: 0.8708 AU
- Semi-major axis: 1.5067 AU
- Eccentricity: 0.4220
- Orbital period (sidereal): 1.85 yr (675 d)
- Mean anomaly: 350.73°
- Mean motion: 0° 31^{m} 58.44^{s} / day
- Inclination: 11.192°
- Longitude of ascending node: 44.188°
- Argument of perihelion: 237.33°
- Earth MOID: 3.51662×10^{−6} AU (526 km)

Physical characteristics
- Mean diameter: 2.7–6 m
- Absolute magnitude (H): 29.97±0.09 · 30.0

2020 JJ is a tiny near-Earth asteroid of the Apollo group that passed 7,000 kilometres (4,300 mi) from the surface of Earth on 4 May 2020. It is estimated to be between 3 and 6 meters in diameter.

== Orbit and classification ==
2020 JJ orbits the Sun at a distance of 0.9–2.1 AU once every 1 years and 10 months (675 days; semi-major axis of 1.51 AU). Its orbit has an eccentricity of 0.42 and an inclination of 11° with respect to the ecliptic.

== Flyby ==
On 4 May 2020, it passed 7,000 km above the southern Pacific Ocean. It was the closest since 2019 UN13 on 31 October 2019.

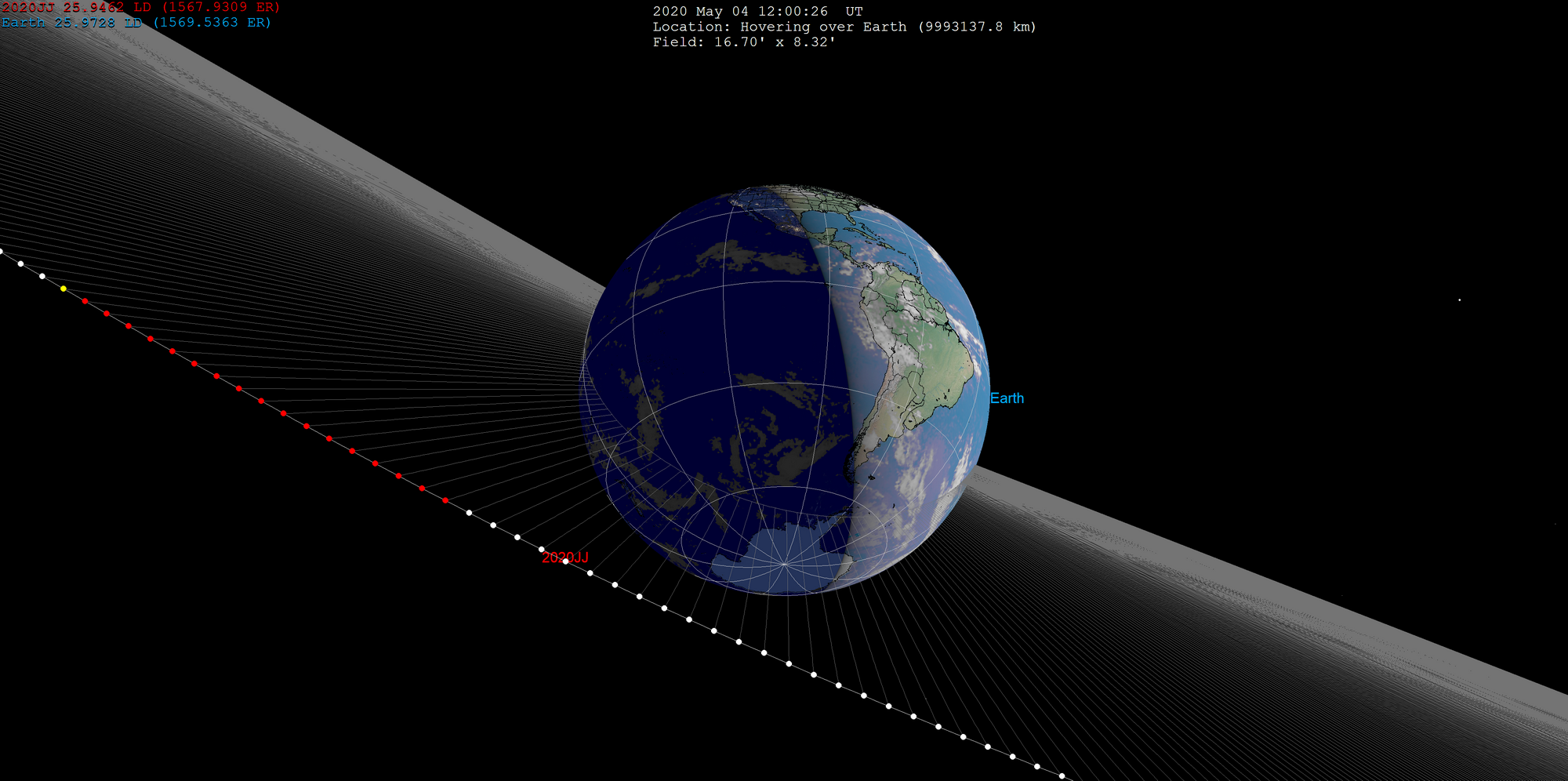
2020 JJ flyby with 1 minute markers, flying left to right. Red shows Earth's shadow.

== See also ==
- List of asteroid close approaches to Earth in 2020
