= (163348) 2002 NN4 =

Near-Earth asteroid

(163348) 2002 NN_{4}
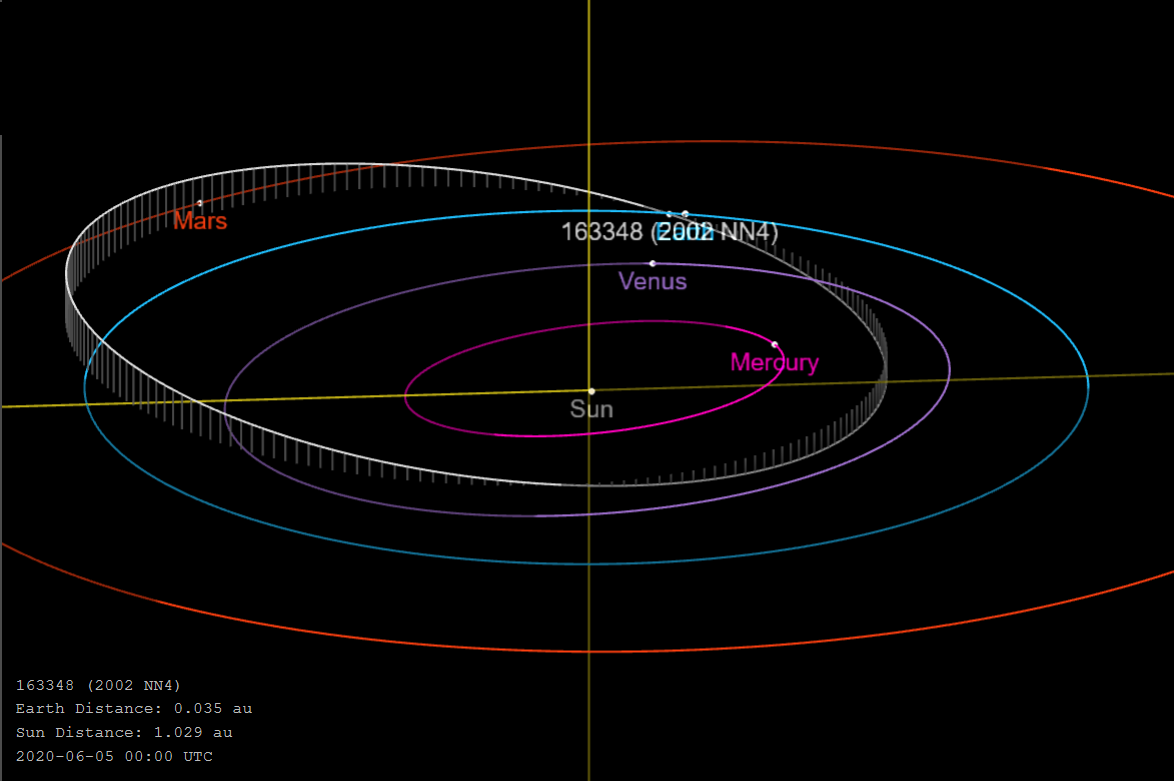
- 2002 NN_{4} orbits between Venus and Mars

Discovery
- Discovered by: LINEAR
- Discovery site: Lincoln Lab's ETS
- Discovery date: 9 July 2002

Designations
- Minor planet category: NEO · PHA · Aten

Orbital characteristics
- Epoch 31 May 2020 (JD 2459000.5)
- Uncertainty parameter 0 · 2
- Observation arc: 14.16 yr (5,171 d)
- Aphelion: 1.2572 AU
- Perihelion: 0.4956 AU
- Semi-major axis: 0.8764 AU
- Eccentricity: 0.4345
- Orbital period (sidereal): 300 days
- Mean anomaly: 83.774°
- Mean motion: 1° 12^{m} 4.68^{s} / day
- Inclination: 5.4177°
- Longitude of ascending node: 259.48°
- Argument of perihelion: 222.23°
- Earth MOID: 0.0069 AU (2.69 LD)

Physical characteristics
- Mean diameter: 0.613 km; 0.735±0.243 km
- Synodic rotation period: 14.50±0.03 h (Note: Lightcurve plot of (163348) 2002 NN_{4}, by Brian Warner at the Center for Solar System Studies (2016). Rotation period of 14.50±0.03 hours with a brightness amplitude of 0.74±0.05 mag. Quality code is 3−. Summary figures at the LCDB and CS3 websites.)
- Geometric albedo: 0.030±0.027; 0.047
- Spectral type: X
- Absolute magnitude (H): 20.1

(163348) 2002 NN_{4} is a dark, sub-kilometer near-Earth object and potentially hazardous asteroid of the Aten group that flew by Earth on 6 June 2020. The highly elongated X-type asteroid has a rotation period of 14.5 hours and measures approximately 0.7 kilometers (0.4 miles) in diameter. It was discovered by LINEAR at the Lincoln Laboratory's Experimental Test Site in New Mexico on 9 July 2002.

== Orbit ==
2002 NN_{4} flew by Earth on 6 June 2020, passing 0.034 AU (5.1 million km; 13 LD) from Earth. The asteroid had been recovered two days earlier on 4 June 2020. By 11 June 2020, the asteroid had brightened to apparent magnitude 14.4, which is roughly the brightness of Pluto.

Being a member of the Aten asteroids, 2002 NN_{4} orbits the Sun at a distance of 0.50–1.26 AU once every 10 months (300 days; semi-major axis of 0.88 AU). Its orbit has an eccentricity of 0.43 and an inclination of 5° with respect to the ecliptic. It was first observed by the Near-Earth Asteroid Tracking on Palomar Observatory on 2 July 2002, or seven nights prior to its official discovery observation by LINEAR. This asteroid has an Earth minimum orbit intersection distance of 0.0069 AU (1,030,000 km), which corresponds to 2.7 lunar distances (LD).

== Physical characteristics ==
A spectroscopic survey of the small near-Earth asteroid population conducted by European astronomers determined that 2002 NN_{4} is an X-type asteroid. Because of the objects low albedo (see below), it would be considered a primitive P-type asteroid in the Tholen classification.

=== Diameter and albedo ===
According to the survey carried out by the NEOWISE mission of NASA's Wide-field Infrared Survey Explorer, 2002 NN_{4} measures (735±243) meters in diameter, and its surface has a dark albedo of (0.030±0.027). (The NEOWISE publication uses the designation G3348 for this asteroid.) In 2016, astronomers using the European New Technology Telescope at La Silla Observatory found a diameter of 613 meters with an albedo of 0.047.

=== Rotation period ===
In August 2016, the first rotational lightcurve of 2002 NN_{4} was obtained from photometric observations over five nights by Brian Warner at the Center for Solar System Studies (U82) in California. Lightcurve analysis gave a rotation period of 14.50±0.03 hours with a high brightness variation of 0.74±0.05 magnitude, indicative of a highly elongated shape (U=3−).
