= 2011 ES4 =

Apollo near-Earth asteroid

2011 ES_{4}
Discovery
- Discovered by: MLS
- Discovery site: Mount Lemmon Obs.
- Discovery date: 2 March 2011 (first observation only)

Designations
- Alternative designations: P1154IU (NEOCP 2020)
- Minor planet category: Apollo; NEO

Orbital characteristics
- Epoch 31 May 2020 (JD 2459000.5)
- Uncertainty parameter 1
- Observation arc: 9.54 yr (3,485 days)
- Aphelion: 1.3548 AU
- Perihelion: 0.8260 AU
- Semi-major axis: 1.0904 AU
- Eccentricity: 0.24248
- Orbital period (sidereal): 1.14 yr (415.9 days)
- Mean anomaly: 337.252°
- Inclination: 3.3735°
- Longitude of ascending node: 339.890°
- Argument of perihelion: 273.568°
- Earth MOID: 0.000630 AU (94,200 km)
- Jupiter MOID: 3.681 AU

Physical characteristics
- Mean diameter: 22–49 m (CNEOS); ~25 m (82 ft)
- Absolute magnitude (H): 25.4

2011 ES_{4} is an Apollo near-Earth asteroid roughly 22–49 meters (72–160 feet) in diameter. It was first observed on 2 March 2011 when the asteroid was about 0.054 AU (8,100,000 km; 5,000,000 mi) from Earth and had a solar elongation of 159 degrees. It passed closest approach to Earth on 13 March 2011. Before the 2020 approach, the asteroid had a short observation arc of 4 days and had not been observed since March 2011. The asteroid was expected to pass within 1 lunar distance of Earth in early September 2020, but did not. There was no risk of a 2020 impact because the line of variation (LOV) did not pass through where Earth would be, and the closest possible 2020 Earth approach was about 0.00047 AU (70,000 km; 44,000 mi). One line of variation showed the asteroid passing closest to Earth on 5 September 2020 at 0.06 AU (9,000,000 km; 5,600,000 mi) with a magnitude of 23, which would place it near the limiting magnitude of even the best automated astronomical surveys.

2011 ES_{4} was recovered as P1154IU on 5 September 2020 at apparent magnitude 18. It passed 0.009886 AU (3.847 LD; 1,478,900 km; 919,000 mi) from Earth on 2 September 2020. With the observation arc being extended to 9 years, it was removed from the Sentry Risk Table on 6 September 2020.

== 2019 ==
NEODyS and JPL Horizons show the asteroid came to opposition (opposite the Sun in the sky) around 8–13 December 2019 at around apparent magnitude 24.8. (Magnitude 24.8 is about 30 times fainter than the more common magnitude 21 detected by automated Near-Earth object surveys.) During opposition, the uncertainty in the asteroid's sky position covered about 3.8 degrees of the sky.

== 2020 ==
On 2 September 2020 the asteroid passed 0.009886 AU (3.847 LD; 1,478,900 km; 919,000 mi) from Earth and was recovered as P1154IU at apparent magnitude 18 on 5 September 2020.

Prior to its recovery in 2020, 2011 ES_{4} had a short 4-day observation arc. Around 1 September 2020 (±8 days), (Note: With a 4 day observation arc, the JPL Small-Body Database for 2020-Sep-01 showed the "Time Uncertainty" as 8_00:08 which is 8 days, 0 hours, and 8 minutes.) it was expected to pass about 0.0008 AU (120,000 km; 74,000 mi) from Earth but could also pass as far away as 0.11 AU (16,000,000 km; 10,000,000 mi), which could make it much fainter and harder to spot again (recover). It could have been around magnitude 22–24 with recovery efforts challenged by the brightness of a 2 September full Moon. Opposition from the Sun did not occur until mid-September. There was no risk of impact as the line of variation (LOV) did not pass through where Earth would be, which computed a closest possible approach of 0.00047 AU (70,000 km; 44,000 mi). JPL Horizons predicted the asteroid to be hidden in the Sun's glare until hours before closest approach. NEODyS did not expect the asteroid to be more than 50 degrees from the Sun until 30 August.

== 2055 ==
With a 9-year observation arc it is known that the asteroid will be 2.1 AU (310,000,000 km; 200,000,000 mi) from Earth on 2 September 2055 (with an uncertainty of ±10 thousand km) and therefore there is no risk of an impact. When there was only a short 4-day observation arc, the Sentry Risk Table showed an estimated 1 in 67000 chance of the asteroid impacting Earth on 2 September 2055. The nominal JPL Horizons 2 September 2055 Earth distance was estimated at 0.8 AU (120,000,000 km; 74,000,000 mi) with a 3-sigma uncertainty of ±40 trillion km. (Due to the short 4-day observation arc, between 2011 and 2055 the uncertainty region grew to wrap around the entire orbit so the asteroid could be anywhere on any of the numerous orbit fits.)

With a diameter between the 20-meter Chelyabinsk meteor and the 50-meter Tunguska event, (Note: Assuming the same density and given that the volume of a sphere $= \frac{\pi}{6}\ d^3$, based on a diameter of 22–49 meters, 2011 ES4 would have a volume of 5600–62000 m^{3}. The larger estimate would be ~10 times more massive.) 2011 ES4 has the potential to do structural damage to a city since asteroids around a diameter of 40 meters can cause wood-frame buildings to collapse. However, as there are numerous variables, the actual effect of an impact might be similar to the smaller of these two events with widespread injuries and damage to buildings if it occurred over a populated area. At 25 meters in diameter it would be a blast equivalent to the high altitude air detonation of a nuclear weapon of around half a megaton yield. (Note: The impact energy for 2011 ES4 at an assumed diameter of 25 meters is 450kt. The impact energy of the Chelyabinsk meteor (with a diameter estimated between 15–25 meters) was measured at 440kt by nuclear test ban sensors.)

== 2121 ==
Around 3 September 2121 (±2 days), it is expected to pass between 0.0007 AU (0.27 LD; 100,000 km; 65,000 mi) and 0.04 AU (6,000,000 km; 3,700,000 mi) from Earth.
