= 2020 UA =

Near earth asteroid

Discovery
- Discovered by: Mount Lemmon Survey
- Discovery site: Mt. Lemmon Obs.
- Discovery date: 16 October 2020

Designations
- Alternative designations: C3K1WP2
- Minor planet category: NEO · Aten

Orbital characteristics
- Epoch 31 May 2020 (JD 2459000.5)
- Uncertainty parameter 4
- Observation arc: 4 days
- Aphelion: 1.206 AU
- Perihelion: 0.7537 AU
- Semi-major axis: 0.980 AU
- Eccentricity: 0.23093
- Orbital period (sidereal): 0.97 yr
- Mean anomaly: 133.866°
- Mean motion: 1° 0^{m} 57.005^{s} / day
- Inclination: 2.762°
- Longitude of ascending node: 27.909°
- Time of perihelion: 20 January 2020 05:17 UT
- Argument of perihelion: 27.909°
- Earth MOID: 0.000204 AU (30,500 km)

Physical characteristics
- Mean diameter: 5–12 m (assumed albedo 0.05–0.25)
- Apparent magnitude: 20.8 (at discovery)
- Absolute magnitude (H): 28.39±0.38; 28.43

2020 UA is a tiny near-Earth asteroid around 5–12 metres (16–39 ft) across that passed within 46,100 km (28,600 mi) of Earth on 21 October 2020 at 02:00 UT.
