= Theodore Lyman IV =

American physicist (1874–1954)

Theodore Lyman
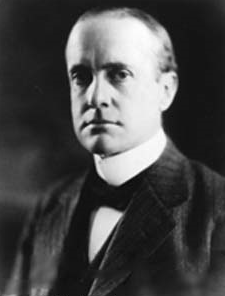
- Lyman in 1926
- Born: November 23, 1874; Boston, Massachusetts
- Died: October 11, 1954 (aged 79); Cambridge, Massachusetts
- Education: Harvard University
- Awards: Elliott Cresson Medal (1931)
- Scientific career
- Fields: Spectroscopy

Theodore Lyman IV (/ˈlaɪmən/; November 23, 1874 – October 11, 1954) was an American physicist and spectroscopist, born in Boston. He graduated from Harvard in 1897, from which he also received his Ph.D. in 1900.

== Career ==
Lyman became an assistant professor in physics at Harvard, where he remained, becoming full professor in 1917, and where he was also director of the Jefferson Physical Laboratory (1908–17). He made important studies in phenomena connected with diffraction gratings, on the wavelengths of vacuum ultraviolet light discovered by Victor Schumann and also on the properties of light of extremely short wavelength, on all of which he contributed valuable papers to the literature of physics in the proceedings of scientific societies.

== Military service ==
During World War I he served in France with the American Expeditionary Force, holding the rank of major of engineers.

== Legacy/honors ==
- He was the eponym of the Lyman series of spectral lines.
- The crater Lyman on the far side of the Moon is named after him.
- He was elected to the American Academy of Arts and Sciences in 1901.
- He was elected to the United States National Academy of Sciences in 1917.
- He was elected to the American Philosophical Society in 1918.
- He was awarded the Franklin Institute's Elliott Cresson Medal and the Frederic Ives Medal in 1931.
- The Optical Society elected him an Honorary Member in 1941.
- The Lyman Laboratory of Physics at Harvard University is named after him.

== Affiliations ==
He became a hereditary member of the Military Order of the Loyal Legion of the United States in succession to his father, Lieutenant Colonel Theodore Lyman III.

Academic offices
Preceded by Wallace Clement Sabine	Hollis Chair of Mathematics and Natural Philosophy; 1921–1926	Succeeded by Percy Williams Bridgman
