= Victor Schumann =

German spectroscopist (1841–1913)

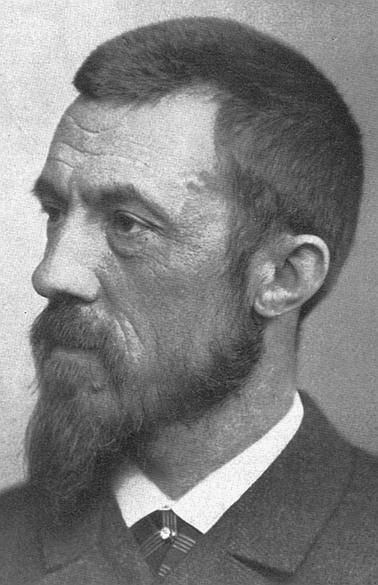
- Born: 21 December 1841; Markranstädt
- Died: 1 September 1913 (aged 71); Leipzig
- Known for: Discovered the vacuum ultraviolet Schumann–Runge bands
- Scientific career
- Fields: Physics

Victor Schumann (21 December 1841 – 1 September 1913) was a physicist and spectroscopist who in 1893 discovered the vacuum ultraviolet.

Schumann studied the extreme ultraviolet region of the electromagnetic spectrum. For this, he used a prism and lenses in fluorite instead of quartz allowing himself to be the first to measure spectra below 200 nm. Oxygen gas would absorb the radiation with a wavelength below 195 nm, but Schumann placed the entire apparatus under vacuum. He prepared his own photographic plates with a reduced layer of gelatin.

He published on the hydrogen line in the spectrum of Nova Aurigae and in the spectrum of vacuum tubes.

His work opened the way to atomic emission spectroscopy, leading eventually to the discovery of the hydrogen spectral lines series (Lyman series) by Theodore Lyman in 1914.
