= Numerov (crater) =

Lunar surface depression

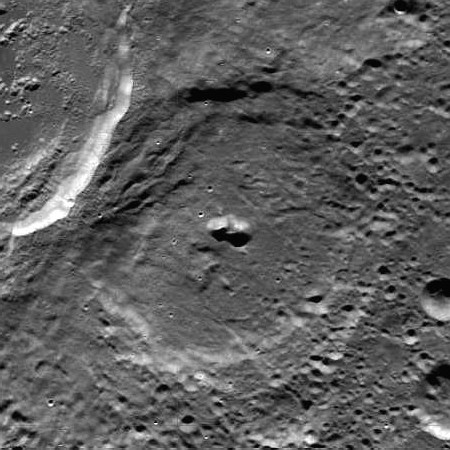
- LRO image
- Coordinates: 70.7°S 160.7°W
- Diameter: 113 km
- Depth: unknown
- Colongitude: 165° at sunrise
- Formation: Nectarian
- Eponym: Boris V. Numerov

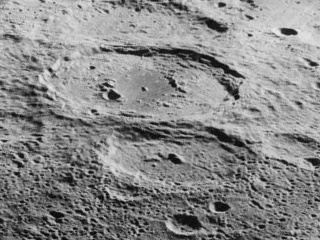
Oblique Lunar Orbiter 5 image facing west of Antoniadi (above center) and Numerov (below center)

Numerov is a lunar impact crater that is located on the Moon's far side, deep in the southern hemisphere. It is attached to the larger and younger crater Antoniadi to the west, and the outer rampart of Antoniadi overlies the inner wall and part of the western interior floor of Numerov. To the east-southeast is the larger walled plain called Zeeman, and to the east-northeast is the old crater Crommelin.

On the lunar geologic timescale, this formation dates to the Nectarian period. The rim and inner wall of Numerov has undergone considerable erosion, and much of the eastern side is pock-marked by small craterlets. There is a small, very eroded crater attached to the exterior to the southeast, and Numerov Z is nearly connected to the northern rim. The interior floor of Numerov is relatively level, but with a central peak formation at the midpoint and some low ridges just to the south. There are a few gouge-like grooves in the surface in the northeastern floor. The western half of the floor and inner walls have been partly overlain by ejecta from Antoniadi.

== Satellite craters ==
By convention these features are identified on lunar maps by placing the letter on the side of the crater midpoint that is closest to Numerov.

Numerov	Latitude	Longitude	Diameter
G	71.7° S	151.9° W	26 km
Z	68.1° S	160.0° W	44 km

== See also ==
- 1206 Numerowia, minor planet
