= Geostationary ring =

Region of geostationary orbits

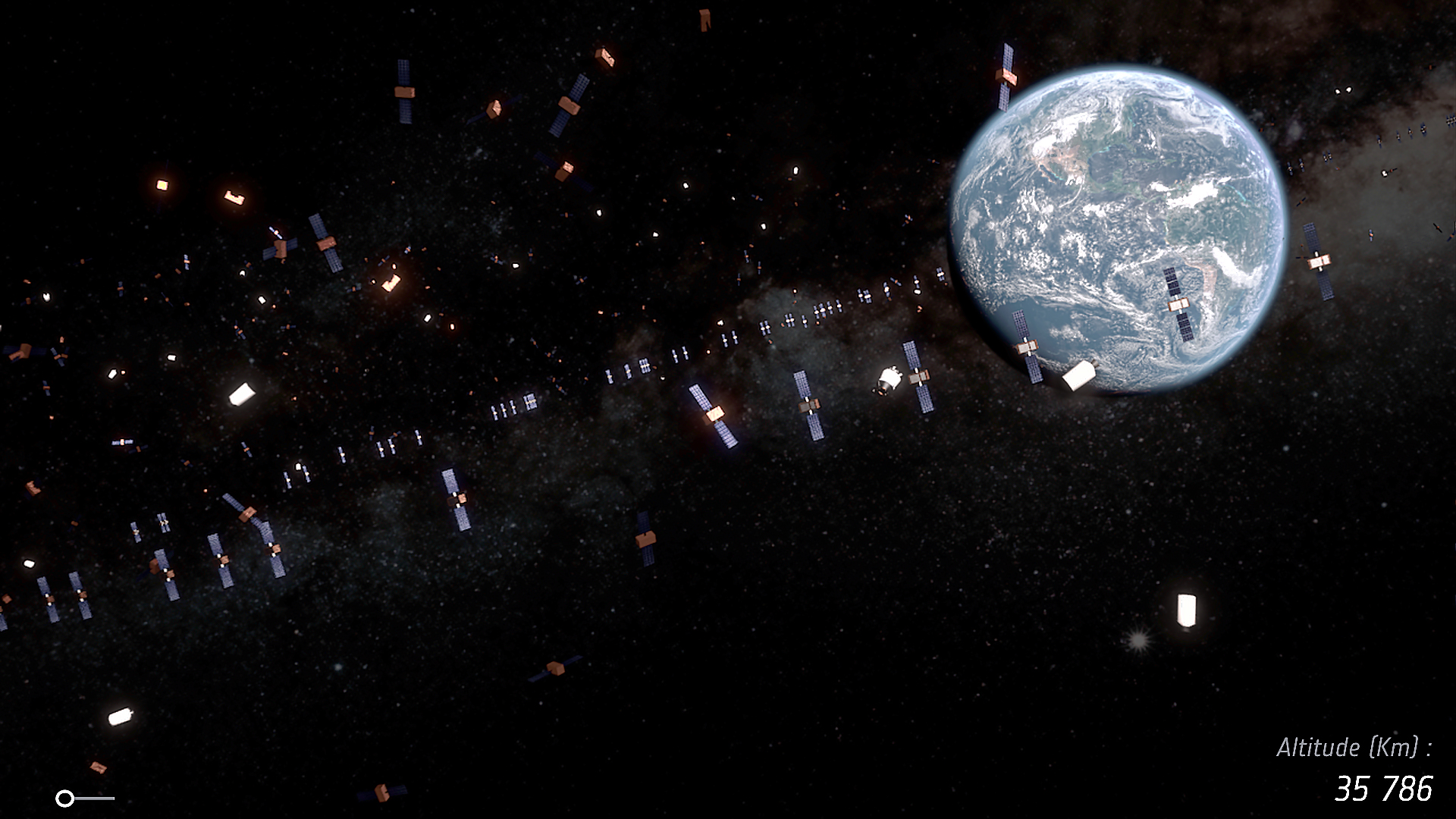
Debris and defunct launcher stages in the geostationary ring

In orbital mechanics, the geostationary ring is the region of space around the Earth that includes geostationary orbits and the volume of space which can be reached by uncontrolled objects which begin in geostationary orbits and are subsequently perturbed. Objects in geostationary orbit can be perturbed by anomalies in the gravitational field of the Earth, by the gravitational effects of Sun and Moon, and by solar radiation pressure.

A precessional motion of the orbital plane is caused by the oblatedness of the Earth ($J_2$), and the gravitational effects of Sun and Moon. This motion has a period of about 53 years. The two parameters describing the direction of the orbit plane in space, the right ascension of the ascending node, and the inclination are affected by this precession. The maximum inclination reached during the 53-year cycle is about 15 degrees. Therefore, the definition of the geostationary ring foresees a declination range from -15 degrees to +15 degrees. In addition, solar radiation pressure induces an eccentricity that leads to a variation of the orbit radius by ± 75 kilometers in some cases. This leads to the definition of the geostationary ring as being a segment of space around the geostationary orbit that ranges from 75 km below GEO to 75 km above GEO and from -15 degrees to 15 degrees declination.

The number of objects in the ring is increasing, and is a source of concern that the risk of collision with space debris in this region is particularly high.
