= 4492 Debussy =

Main-belt asteroid

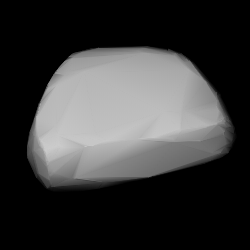
- Shape model of Debussy from its light curve

Discovery
- Discovered by: E. W. Elst
- Discovery site: Haute-Provence Obs.
- Discovery date: 17 September 1988

Designations
- Pronunciation: /dɛbjʊˈsiː/ etc.
- Named after: Claude Debussy (French composer)
- Alternative designations: 1988 SH · 1979 SZ_{10} 1979 VF_{1} · 1981 EC
- Minor planet category: main-belt · (middle) background

Orbital characteristics
- Epoch 4 September 2017 (JD 2458000.5)
- Uncertainty parameter 0
- Observation arc: 65.65 yr (23,977 days)
- Aphelion: 3.2631 AU
- Perihelion: 2.2692 AU
- Semi-major axis: 2.7662 AU
- Eccentricity: 0.1796
- Orbital period (sidereal): 4.60 yr (1,680 days)
- Mean anomaly: 76.633°
- Mean motion: 0° 12^{m} 51.12^{s} / day
- Inclination: 8.0241°
- Longitude of ascending node: 350.05°
- Argument of perihelion: 52.507°
- Known satellites: 1

Physical characteristics
- Mean diameter: 13.23±3.97 km 14.64 km (calculated); 14.75±0.91 km 16.5±1.9 km 17.14±2.94 km 17.359±0.697 km
- Synodic rotation period: 20 h 26.58±0.05 h 26.59 h 26.6 h 26.606±0.001 h
- Geometric albedo: 0.039±0.018; 0.0406±0.0162; 0.041±0.016; 0.046±0.017; 0.057 (assumed); 0.058±0.008; 0.07±0.08
- Spectral type: C
- Absolute magnitude (H): 12.80 · 12.9 · 13.05 · 13.05±0.07 · 13.37±0.25

4492 Debussy (provisional designation: 1988 SH) is a dark and elongated background asteroid and binary system from the intermediate asteroid belt, approximately 15 kilometers (9.3 miles) in diameter. It was discovered on 17 September 1988, by Belgian astronomer Eric Elst at Haute-Provence Observatory in France. It was later named after French composer Claude Debussy.

== Orbit and classification ==
Debussy is a non-family asteroid from the main belt's background population. It orbits the Sun in the middle main-belt at a distance of 2.3–3.3 AU once every 4 years and 7 months (1,680 days; semi-major axis of 2.77 AU). Its orbit has an eccentricity of 0.18 and an inclination of 8° with respect to the ecliptic. A first precovery was taken at Palomar Observatory in 1951, extending the body's observation arc by 37 years prior to its official discovery observation.

== Naming ==
This minor planet was named in memory of French composer Claude Debussy (1862–1918), one of the most prominent figures associated with impressionist music, best known for his Clair de lune and Feux d'artifice, as well as for his piano suites Estampes (1903), Bergamasque (1890–1905) and Images (1905). He was a fervent admirer of Frédéric Chopin, after whom the asteroid 3784 Chopin was named. The official naming citation was published on 4 October 1990 (M.P.C. 17031).

== Diameter and albedo ==
According to the surveys carried out by the Japanese Akari satellite, the Infrared Spectrograph of the Spitzer Space Telescope, and NASA's Wide-field Infrared Survey Explorer with its subsequent NEOWISE mission, Debussy measures between 13.23 and 17.359 kilometers in diameter and its surface has an albedo between 0.039 and 0.07. The Collaborative Asteroid Lightcurve Link assumes a standard albedo for carbonaceous asteroids of 0.057 and calculates a diameter of 14.64 kilometers with an absolute magnitude of 12.9.

== Rotation period ==
Between 2002 and 2016, a large number of rotational lightcurve of Debussy were obtained from photometric observations by predominantly Swiss, French and German astronomers. Best rated lightcurve analysis gave a rotation period of 26.606 hours with a brightness variation of 1.04–1.13 magnitude, which indicates that the body is highly elongated (U=3/3).

== Satellite ==
In November 2002, during the first photometric observations by Swiss astronomer Raoul Behrend at Geneva Observatory in collaboration with several other European astronomers, it was revealed that Debussy is a synchronous binary system with a minor-planet moon in orbit (F-type binary). The satellite's orbital period is 26.606 hours, identical to the primary's rotation. The system's secondary-to-primary mean-diameter ratio is 0.643. The Johnston archive derives a diameter of 9.39 kilometers for the moon, and estimates that it has a semi-major axis of approximately 31 kilometers. After additional follow-up observations had been made, the discovery was announced on 21 March 2004. The collaboration of astronomers from 26 observatories also discovered satellites in orbit of the main-belt asteroids 854 Frostia, 1089 Tama and 1313 Berna.
