= Minor-planet moon =

Natural satellite of a minor planet

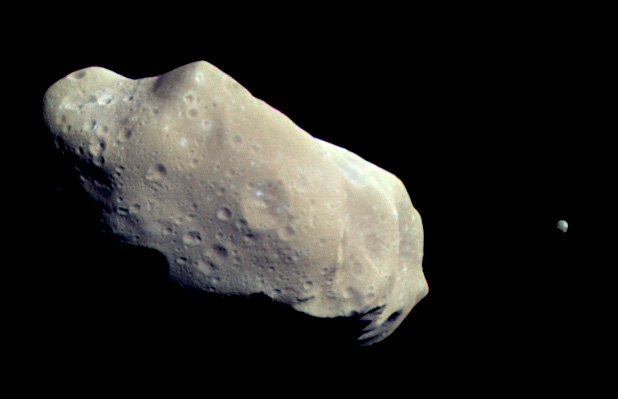
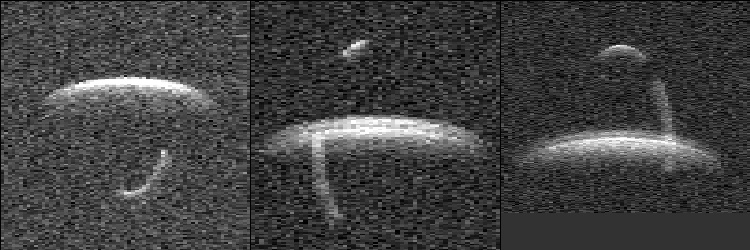
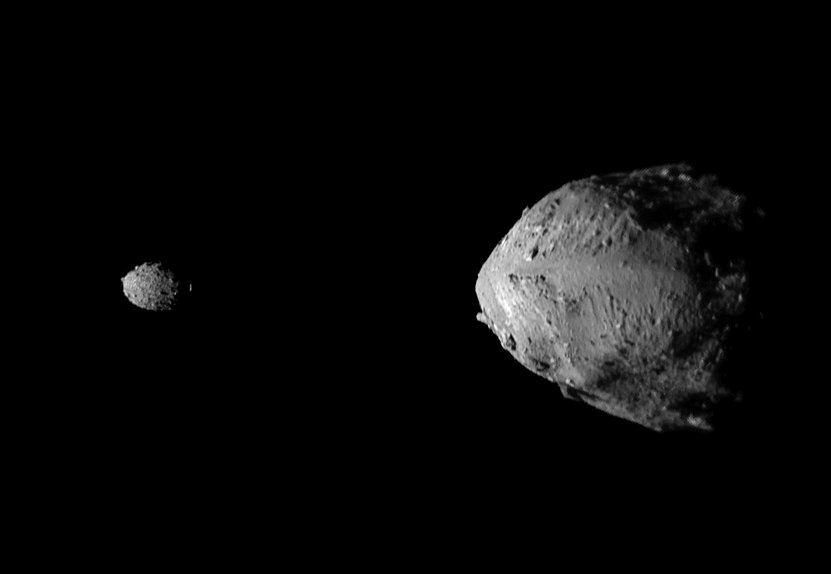
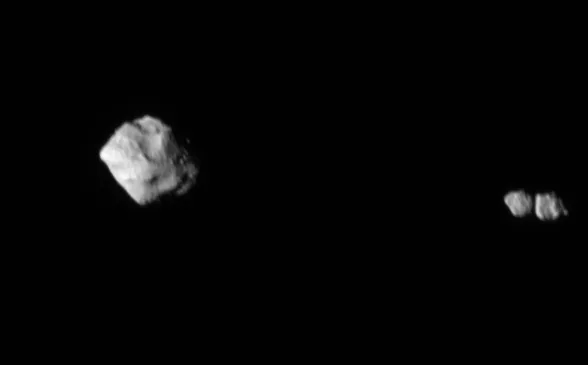
- Top: 243 Ida and its moon Dactyl as imaged by Galileo in 1993.
- Middle: Three radar images of 66391 Moshup. The 'streaks' on the image are its moon Squannit's trail as it moved while the images were created.
- Bottom: Image of 65803 Didymos and its moon Dimorphos (left). Animation of (136617) 1994 CC, a triple asteroid with two moons (middle). Dinkinesh and its contact binary satellite Selam (right).

A minor-planet moon is an astronomical object that orbits a minor planet as its natural satellite. As of November 2026, there are 656 minor planets known or suspected to have moons. Discoveries of minor-planet moons (and binary objects, in general) are important because the determination of their orbits allows a calculation of the mass and density of the primary, allowing insights into their physical properties that are generally not otherwise accessible.

Several of the moons are quite large compared to their primaries: 90 Antiope, Mors–Somnus and Sila–Nunam (95%), Patroclus–Menoetius, Altjira and Lempo–Hiisi (90%, with Lempo–Paha at 50%). The largest known minor-planet moon in absolute size is Pluto's moon Charon, which has about half the diameter of Pluto.

There are also several known ring systems around distant objects (see: Rings of Chariklo and Chiron).

== Terminology ==
In addition to the terms satellite and moon, the term "binary" (binary minor planet) is sometimes used for minor planets with one moon, and "triple" for minor planets with two moons. If one object is much bigger it is referred to as the primary and its companion as the secondary. The term double asteroid is sometimes used for systems in which the asteroid and its moon are roughly the same size, while binary tends to be used independently from the relative sizes of the components. When binary minor planets are similar in size, the Minor Planet Center (MPC) refers to them as "binary companions" instead of referring to the smaller body as a satellite. A good example of a true binary is the 90 Antiope system, identified in August 2000. Very small satellites are often referred to as moonlets.

== Discovery milestones ==
Prior to the era of the Hubble Space Telescope and space probes reaching the outer Solar System, attempts to detect satellites around asteroids were limited to optical observations from Earth. For example, in 1978, stellar occultation observations were claimed as evidence of a satellite for the asteroid to 532 Herculina. However, later more-detailed imaging by the Hubble Telescope did not reveal a satellite, and the current consensus is that Herculina does not have a significant satellite. There were other similar reports of asteroids having companions (usually referred to as satellites) in the following years. A letter by astronomer Thomas Hamilton in the Sky & Telescope magazine at this time pointed to apparently simultaneous impact craters on Earth (for example, the Clearwater Lakes in Quebec), suggesting that these craters were caused by pairs of gravitationally bound objects.

Also in 1978, Pluto's largest moon Charon was discovered; however, at the time Pluto was still considered to be one of the major planets.

In 1993, the first asteroid moon was confirmed when the Galileo probe discovered the small Dactyl orbiting 243 Ida in the asteroid belt. The second was discovered around 45 Eugenia in 1998. In 2001, 617 Patroclus and its same-sized companion Menoetius became the first known binary asteroids in the Jupiter trojans. The first trans-Neptunian binary after Pluto–Charon, 1998 WW31, was optically resolved in 2002.

In 2021, 130 Elektra was discovered to have three moons, making it the only known quadruple asteroid.

=== Multiple systems ===
In 2005, the asteroid 87 Sylvia was discovered to have a second satellite, making it the first known triple system (also called a triple minor planet or triple asteroid). This was followed by the discovery of a second moon orbiting 45 Eugenia. Also in 2005, the dwarf planet Haumea was discovered to have two moons, and Pluto was discovered to have three. Additionally, 216 Kleopatra and 93 Minerva were discovered to be triple asteroids in 2008 and 2009 respectively. Beside Pluto, there has been one discovered quadruple minor planet, that being 130 Elektra. As of 2025, the total number of known multiple systems among minor planets (including the Pluto and Haumea systems) is 18.

The following table lists all satellites of multiple systems, starting with Pluto, which was unnumbered when its first moon was discovered in 1978. The highest known multiplicities are for Pluto (a sextuple system) and 130 Elektra (a quadruple system).

Parent body		Minor-planet moon			
Designation	Orbital class	Designation	Discovery date	Announcement date	Announcement of triple
Pluto	Kuiper belt	Charon	1978/06/22	1978/07/07	2005/10/31
Pluto	Kuiper belt	Nix	2005/05/15	2005/10/31	2005/10/31
Pluto	Kuiper belt	Hydra	2005/05/15	2005/10/31	2005/10/31
Pluto	Kuiper belt	Kerberos	2011/06/28	2013/07/02	2005/10/31
Pluto	Kuiper belt	Styx	2012/06/26	2013/07/02	2005/10/31
45 Eugenia	Asteroid belt	Petit-Prince	1998/11/01	1999/03/20	2007/03/07
45 Eugenia	Asteroid belt	S/2004 (45) 1 "Petite-Princesse"	2004/02/14	2007/03/07	2007/03/07
87 Sylvia	Asteroid belt	Romulus	2001/02/18	2005/08/11	2005/08/11
87 Sylvia	Asteroid belt	Remus	2004/08/09	2005/08/11	2005/08/11
93 Minerva	Asteroid belt	Aegis	2009/08/16	2013/12/17	2013/12/17
93 Minerva	Asteroid belt	Gorgoneion	2009/08/16	2013/12/17	2013/12/17
107 Camilla	Asteroid belt	S/2001 (107) 1	2001/03/01	2001/03/19	2016/08/07
107 Camilla	Asteroid belt	S/2016 (107) 1	2015/05/29	2016/08/07	2016/08/07
130 Elektra	Asteroid belt	S/2003 (130) 1 ("Beta")	2003/08/15	2003/08/17	2014/12/16
130 Elektra	Asteroid belt	S/2014 (130) 1 ("Gamma")	2014/12/06	2014/12/16	2014/12/16
130 Elektra	Asteroid belt	"Delta" (unofficial)	2014/12/09	2021/11/06	2014/12/16
216 Kleopatra	Asteroid belt	Alexhelios	2008/09/19	2011/02/18	2011/02/18
216 Kleopatra	Asteroid belt	Cleoselene	2008/09/19	2011/02/18	2011/02/18
2577 Litva	Mars-crosser	–	2009/02/28	2009/03/11	2013/12/22
2577 Litva	Mars-crosser	–	2012/06/22	2013/12/22	2013/12/22
3122 Florence	Amor	–	2017/08/29	2017/09/01	2017/09/01
3122 Florence	Amor	–	2017/08/29	2017/09/01	2017/09/01
3749 Balam	Asteroid belt	–	2002/02/08	2002/02/13	2008/03/12
3749 Balam	Asteroid belt	–	2007/07/15	2008/03/12	2008/03/12
4666 Dietz	Asteroid belt	–	2015/09/02	2015/10/??	2018/07/20
4666 Dietz	Asteroid belt	–	2015/09/02	2018/07/20	2018/07/20
6186 Zenon	Asteroid belt	–	2017/01/01	2017/01/14	2017/01/14
6186 Zenon	Asteroid belt	–	2017/01/01	2017/01/14	2017/01/14
47171 Lempo	Kuiper belt	Paha	2001/12/08	2002/01/10	2009/10/??
47171 Lempo	Kuiper belt	Hiisi	2009/10/??	2009/10/??	2009/10/??
136108 Haumea	Kuiper belt	Hiʻiaka	2005/01/26	2008/09/17	2008/09/17
136108 Haumea	Kuiper belt	Namaka	2005/06/30	2008/09/17	2008/09/17
(136617) 1994 CC	Apollo	Beta (unofficial)	2009/06/12	2009/06/19	2009/06/19
(136617) 1994 CC	Apollo	Gamma (unofficial)	2009/06/12	2009/06/19	2009/06/19
(153591) 2001 SN263	Amor	Beta (unofficial)	2008/02/12	2008/02/12	2008/02/12
(153591) 2001 SN263	Amor	Gamma (unofficial)	2008/02/12	2008/02/12	2008/02/12
(348400) 2005 JF21	Amor	–	2015/08/??	2015/08/22	2020/06/09
(348400) 2005 JF21	Amor	–	2020/05/??	2020/06/09	2020/06/09
(363027) 1998 ST27	Aten	–	2001/10/07	2001/10/09	2024/10/11
(363027) 1998 ST27	Aten	–	2024/10/??	2024/10/11	2024/10/11

== Commonality ==
The data about the populations of binary objects are still patchy. In addition to the inevitable observational bias (dependence on the distance from Earth, size, albedo and separation of the components) the frequency appears to be different among different categories of objects. Among asteroids, an estimated 2% would have satellites. Among trans-Neptunian objects (TNOs), an estimated 11% are thought to be binary or multiple objects, and the majority of the large TNOs have at least one satellite, including all four IAU-listed dwarf planets.

More than 50 binaries are known in each of the main groupings: near-Earth asteroids, belt asteroids, and trans-Neptunian objects, not including numerous claims based solely on light-curve variation.

Two binaries have been found so far among centaurs with semi-major axes smaller than Neptune. Both are double ring systems around 2060 Chiron and 10199 Chariklo, discovered in 1993–2011 and 2013 respectively.

== Origin ==
The origin of minor-planet moons is not currently known with certainty, and a variety of hypotheses exist. One such model is that minor-planet moons are formed from debris knocked off the primary by an impact. Other pairings may be formed when a small object is captured by the gravity of a larger one.

Formation by collision is constrained by the angular momentum of the components, i.e. by the masses and their separation. Close binaries fit this model (e.g. Pluto–Charon). Distant binaries however, with components of comparable size, are unlikely to have followed this scenario, unless considerable mass has been lost in the event.

The distances of the components for the known binaries vary from a few hundreds of kilometres (243 Ida, 3749 Balam) to more than 3000 km (379 Huenna) for the asteroids. Among TNOs, the known separations vary from 3,000 to 50,000 km.

== Populations and classes ==
What is "typical" for a binary system tends to depend on its location in the Solar System (presumably because of different modes of origin and lifetimes of such systems in different populations of minor planets).

- Among near-Earth asteroids, satellites tend to orbit at distances of the order of 3–7 primary radii, and have diameters two to several times smaller than the primary. Since these binaries are all inner-planet crossers, it is thought that tidal stresses that occurred when the parent object passed close to a planet may be responsible for the formation of many of them, although collisions are thought to also be a factor in the creation of these satellites.
- Among main-belt asteroids, the satellites are usually much smaller than the primary (a notable exception being 90 Antiope), and orbit around 10 primary radii away. Many of the binary systems here are members of asteroid families, and a good proportion of satellites are expected to be fragments of a parent body whose disruption after an asteroid collision produced both the primary and satellite.

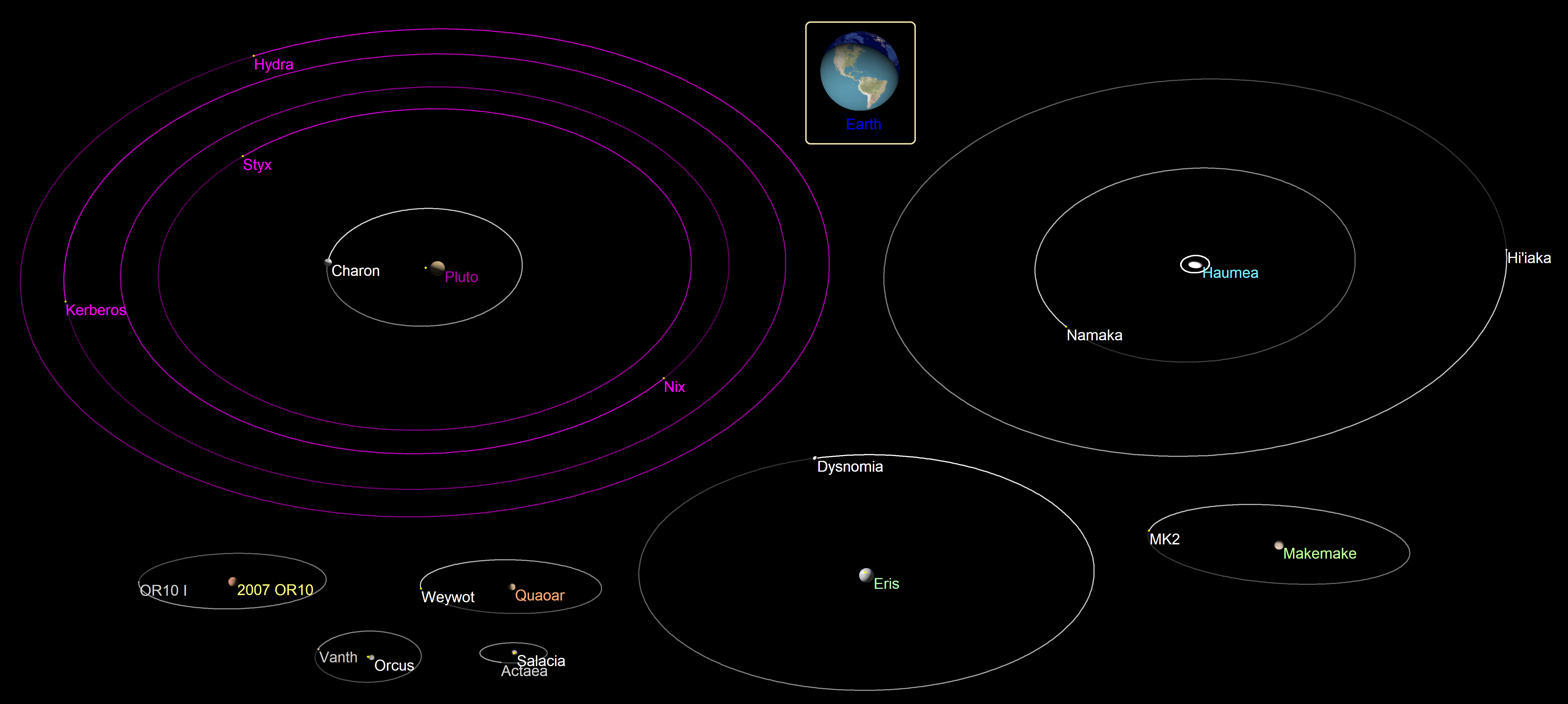
The eight largest TNOs with moons (Pluto, Haumea, Makemake, Eris, Quaoar, Gonggong, Orcus and Salacia), with the Earth to scale. Gonggong is written as its provisional designation, 2007 OR_{10}.

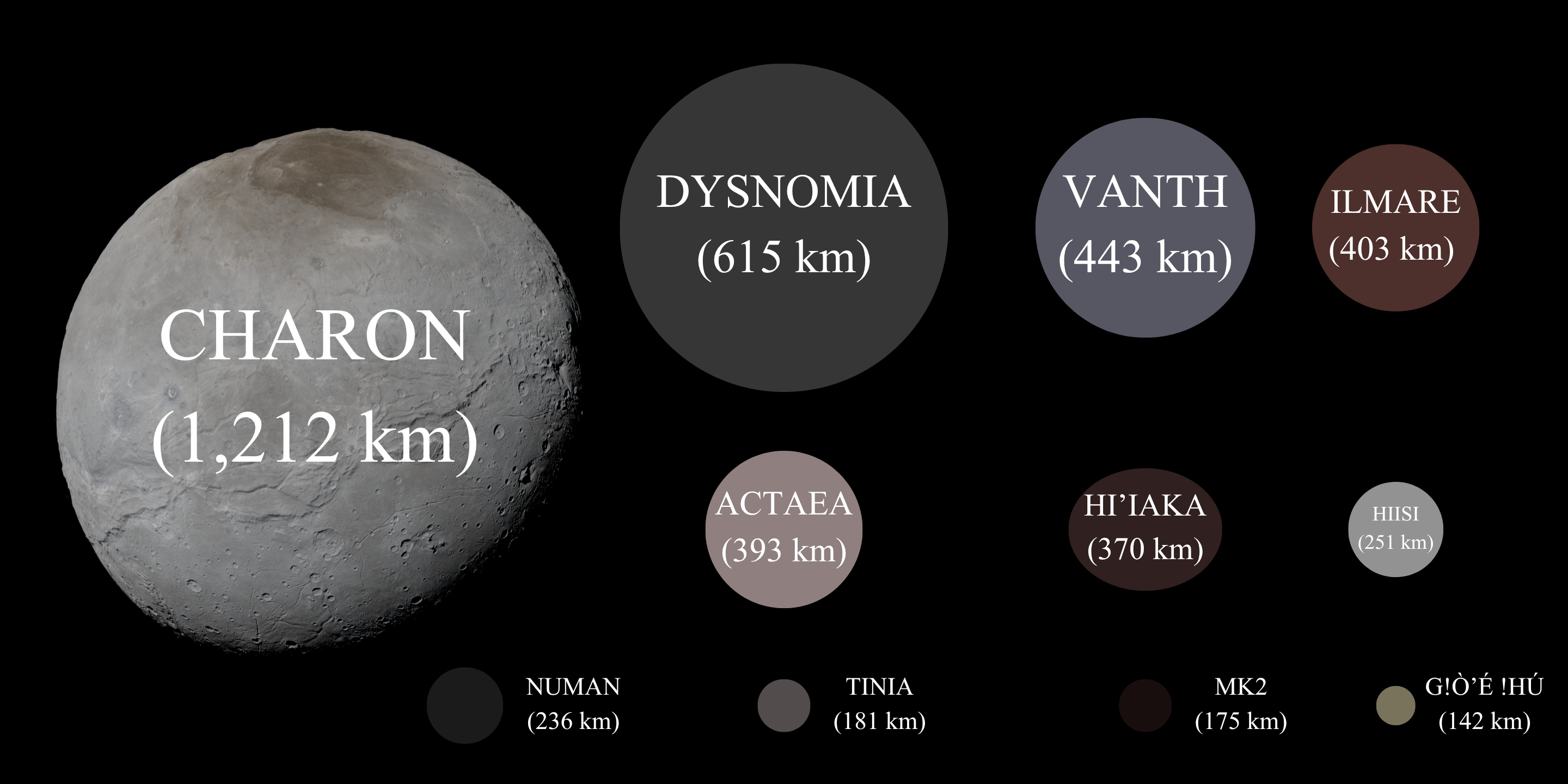
Diagram of some of the largest TNO moons

- Among trans-Neptunian objects, it is common for the two orbiting components to be of comparable size, and for the semi-major axis of their orbits to be much larger − about 100 to 1000 primary radii. A significant proportion of these binaries are expected to be primordial.
  - Pluto has five known moons. Its largest moon Charon has a radius of more than half that of Pluto, and is large enough to orbit a point outside Pluto's surface. In fact, each orbits the common barycenter between them, with Pluto's orbit entirely enclosed by Charon's; thus they form a binary system informally referred to as a double dwarf planet. Pluto's four other moons, Nix, Hydra, Kerberos, and Styx, are far smaller and orbit the Pluto–Charon system.
  - Haumea has two moons with radii estimated around 155 km (Hiʻiaka) and 85 km (Namaka).
  - Makemake has one known moon, S/2015 (136472) 1, estimated to be some 160 kilometers (100 mi) in diameter.
  - 47171 Lempo is a unique trans-Neptunian triple system: Lempo and its moon of roughly equal mass, Hiisi, form a close-proximity binary, separated by roughly 867 km. A second moon, Paha, orbits the Lempo–Hiisi binary at about 7411 km.
  - Eris has one known moon, Dysnomia. Its radius, based on its brightness, is estimated to be roughly between 150 and 350 km.

== List ==
As of November 2026, there are 656 minor planets (systems) with 679 known or suspected companions altogether. The following table is a listing of the total number of these systems by orbital class:

# of Systems	Orbital class	List by class	Multiple satellites
113	Near-Earth objects	go to list	Five systems confirmed with two satellites: 3122 Florence, (136617) 1994 CC, (363027) 1998 ST27, (153591) 2001 SN263, and (348400) 2005 JF21.
36	Mars-crossing asteroids	go to list	One system confirmed with two satellites: 2577 Litva.
342	Main-belt asteroids	go to list	Eight systems confirmed with two satellites: 45 Eugenia, 87 Sylvia, 93 Minerva, 107 Camilla, 216 Kleopatra, 3749 Balam, 4666 Dietz, 6186 Zenon. One quadruple system confirmed with three satellites: 130 Elektra. One binary with dual comet designation: (300163) 2006 VW139.
8	Jupiter trojans	go to list	–
157	Trans-Neptunian objects	go to list	Two systems confirmed with two satellites: 47171 Lempo and 136108 Haumea. One system confirmed with five satellites: 134340 Pluto.

=== Near-Earth objects ===
This is a list of near-Earth asteroids with companions. Candidate binaries with an unconfirmed status are displayed on a dark background. For an overview, see summary and introduction.

System					Primary		Secondary						Refs
Designation	Class	D_{e} (km)	s/p-ratio	YOD	D_{p} (km)	RT_{p} (hours)	Designation	YOD	D_{s} (km)	RT_{s} (hours)	a_{s} (km)	P_{s} (hours)	Refs
1862 Apollo	APO	1.55	0.052	1932	1.55	3.065	–	2005	0.08	–	3.75	27.36	BIN JPL LoMP
1866 Sisyphus	APO	8.48	0.1	1972	8.44	2.3909	–	1985	0.84	–	19	27.12	BIN JPL LoMP
3122 Florence	AMO	4.40	0.04; 0.04	1981	4.4	2.3581	–	2017	0.2	–	4.6	7.2	BIN JPL LoMP
3122 Florence	AMO	4.40	0.04; 0.04	1981	4.4	2.3581	–	2017	0.3	–	9.8	24	BIN JPL LoMP
3671 Dionysus	AMO	1.46	0.2	1984	1.43	2.705	S/1997 (3671) 1	1997	0.29	–	3.4	27.744	BIN JPL LoMP
5143 Heracles	APO	3.65	0.167	1991	3.6	2.706	–	2011	0.6	–	4	15.5	BIN JPL LoMP
5381 Sekhmet	ATE	1.04	0.3	1991	1	2.7	–	2003	0.3	10	1.54	12.5	BIN JPL LoMP
(5646) 1990 TR	AMO	2.72	0.18+	1990	2.68	3.1999	–	2012	0.48	–	5.1	19.4712	BIN JPL LoMP
7088 Ishtar	AMO	1.51	0.42	1992	1.39	2.679	–	2006	0.33	–	2.8	20.6496	BIN JPL LoMP
(7888) 1993 UC	APO	2.72	–	1993	2.72	2.34	–	2013	–	–	7.7	35.04	BIN JPL LoMP
15745 Yuliya	AMO	1.2	0.46+	1991	0.61+	3.2495	–	2018	0.28+	–	–	11.735	BIN JPL LoMP
(31345) 1998 PG	AMO	0.94	0.3	1998	0.9	2.51620	–	2001	0.27	–	1.4	14.0064	BIN JPL LoMP
(31346) 1998 PB1	AMO	1.26	0.38+	1998	1.18	2.7358	–	2021	0.45+	–	4.6	55.39	BIN JPL; LoMP
(35107) 1991 VH	APO	1.12	0.4	1991	1.04	2.624	S/2008 (35107) 1	1997	0.42	–	3.26	32.64	BIN JPL LoMP
(53110) 1999 AR7	AMO	1.5	0.41+	1999	1.4	2.7375	–	2015	0.6+	–	3.8	31.32	BIN JPL LoMP
65803 Didymos	AMO	0.77	0.22	1996	0.75	2.259	Dimorphos; S/2003 (65803) 1	2003	0.177	–	1.18	11.8992	BIN JPL LoMP
(66063) 1998 RO1	ATE	0.89	0.48	1998	0.8	2.492	–	2002	0.38	–	1.2	14.5392	BIN JPL LoMP
66391 Moshup	ATE	1.39	0.341	1999	1.317	2.7645	Squannit; S/2001 (66391) 1	2001	0.451	17.4	2.548	17.4216	BIN JPL LoMP
(68063) 2000 YJ66	AMO	2.3	–	2000	2.3	2.1102	–	2014	–	–	3.8	15.7	BIN JPL LoMP
69230 Hermes	APO	0.81	0.9	1937	0.6	13.894	–	2003	0.54	13.892	1.1	13.8936	BIN JPL LoMP
(85275) 1994 LY	AMO	2.51	0.24+	1994	2.44	2.696	–	2020	0.59+	–	4.2	16.6238	BIN JPL LoMP
(85938) 1999 DJ4	APO	0.48	0.5	1999	0.43	2.514	–	2004	0.21	–	0.8	17.7312	BIN JPL LoMP
(88710) 2001 SL9	APO	1	0.28	2001	0.96	2.4	–	2001	0.2	–	1.6	16.399	BIN JPL LoMP
(136617) 1994 CC	APO	0.64	0.182; 0.129	1994	0.62	2.3886	Beta (unofficial)	2009	0.113	–	1.729	29.832	BIN JPL LoMP
(136617) 1994 CC	APO	0.64	0.182; 0.129	1994	0.62	2.3886	Gamma (unofficial)	2009	0.08	–	6.130	201.024	BIN JPL LoMP
(136993) 1998 ST49	APO	0.69	0.109	1998	0.69	2.302	–	2012	0.08	–	–	–	BIN JPL LoMP
(137170) 1999 HF1	ATE	3.73	0.23	1999	3.64	2.319	–	1999	0.84	–	7.3	14.01696	BIN JPL LoMP
(138095) 2000 DK79	AMO	2.18	–	2000	2.18	4.243	–	2013	–	–	–	–	BIN JPL LoMP
(143649) 2003 QQ47	APO	0.995	0.33	2003	0.94	2.6446	–	2021	0.31	13.065	1.4	13.07	BIN JPL; LoMP
(152931) 2000 EA107	ATE	1.65	–	2000	1.65	4.1367	–	2019	–	16.079	–	–	BIN JPL; LoMP
(153591) 2001 SN263	AMO	2.85	0.408; 0.177	2001	2.6	3.425	Beta (unofficial)	2008	1.06	–	16.633	149.4	BIN JPL LoMP
(153591) 2001 SN263	AMO	2.85	0.408; 0.177	2001	2.6	3.425	Gamma (unofficial)	2008	0.46	–	3.804	16.464	BIN JPL LoMP
(153958) 2002 AM31	APO	0.46	0.25	2002	0.45	2.817	–	2012	0.11	–	1.5	26.304	BIN JPL LoMP
(162000) 1990 OS	APO	0.3	0.167	1990	0.3	2.536	–	2003	0.05	–	0.6	21	BIN JPL LoMP
(162483) 2000 PJ5	ATE	0.62	0.5	2000	0.55	2.642	–	2005	0.28	–	1.05	14.16	BIN JPL LoMP
163693 Atira	ATI	4.9	0.21	2003	4.8	2.9745	–	2017	1	–	6	15.504	BIN JPL LoMP
(164121) 2003 YT1	APO	1.12	0.191	2003	1.1	2.343	–	2004	0.21	–	3.93	36.696	BIN JPL LoMP
(175706) 1996 FG3	APO	1.69	0.28	1996	1.69	3.595195	–	1998	0.49	16.15	3	16.1508	BIN JPL LoMP
(185851) 2000 DP107	APO	0.85	0.41	2000	0.8	2.774	–	2000	0.3	–	2.62	42.192	BIN JPL LoMP
(190166) 2005 UP156	AMO	1.05	–	2005	1.045	40.542	–	2017	–	–	–	–	BIN JPL LoMP
(190208) 2006 AQ	AMO	1.06	–	2006	1.06	182	–	2015	–	2.62	–	–	BIN JPL LoMP
(226514) 2003 UX34	APO	0.28	0.5	2003	0.25	–	–	2017	0.1	–	–	–	BIN JPL LoMP
(250162) 2002 TY57	AMO	0.38	0.18+	2002	0.37	2.5001	–	2018	0.07+	–	0.5	10.76	BIN JPL LoMP
(276049) 2002 CE26	APO	3.46	0.087	2002	3.46	3.2931	–	2004	0.3	–	4.7	15.6	BIN JPL LoMP
(285263) 1998 QE2	AMO	3.09	0.25	1998	3.2	4.751	–	2013	0.8	1.3046	6.212	31.3104	BIN JPL LoMP
(285571) 2000 PQ9	AMO	1	–	2000	1	–	–	2021	–	–	–	–	BIN JPL; LoMP
(310560) 2001 QL142	APO	0.92	–	2001	0.92	–	–	2017	–	–	–	–	BIN JPL LoMP
(311066) 2004 DC	APO	0.37	0.2	2004	0.36	2.6	–	2006	0.07	7	0.75	23.04	BIN JPL LoMP
326732 Nice	AMO	0.95	0.23	2003	0.93	3.463	–	2021	0.21	22.92	2	22.92	BIN JPL; LoMP
(348400) 2005 JF21	AMO	0.6	0.18	2005	0.6	2.4144	–	2015	0.11	–	0.9	14.736	BIN JPL LoMP
(357439) 2004 BL86	APO	0.33	0.21	2004	0.32	2.6	–	2015	0.07	–	0.5	14.4	BIN JPL LoMP
(363027) 1998 ST27	ATE	0.81	0.15	1998	0.8	3-	–	2001	0.12	<6	4.5	98.4	BIN JPL LoMP
(363067) 2000 CO101	APO	0.62	0.065	2000	0.62	5.12	–	2009	0.04	–	0.61	7.2	BIN JPL LoMP
(363599) 2004 FG11	APO	0.17	0.533	2004	0.15	4-	–	2012	0.08-	–	0.25	20	BIN JPL LoMP
(374851) 2006 VV2	APO	1.82	0.28	2006	1.06	2.41	–	2007	0.3+	–	1.5	5.52	BIN JPL LoMP
(385186) 1994 AW1	AMO	1.04	0.49	1994	0.94	2.519	–	1994	0.46	–	2	22.3296	BIN JPL LoMP
(399307) 1991 RJ2	AMO	0.55	0.47+	1991	0.5	3.4907	–	2014	0.24	15.917	0.86	15.91704	BIN JPL LoMP
(399774) 2005 NB7	APO	0.54	0.32+	2005	0.5	3.4883	–	2008	0.2	15.267	0.6	15.2808	BIN JPL LoMP
(410777) 2009 FD	APO	0.17	0.6	2009	0.15	4	–	2015	0.09	–	0.25	14.4	BIN JPL LoMP
(450894) 2008 BT18	APO	0.63	0.333	2008	0.6	2.726	–	2008	0.2+	–	1.5	28.8	BIN JPL LoMP
(452561) 2005 AB	AMO	1.95	0.24	2005	1.9+	3.339	–	2005	0.46	–	3.4	17.9304	BIN JPL LoMP
(461852) 2006 GY2	APO	0.41	0.2	2006	0.4	2.27	–	2006	0.08	–	0.5	11.7	BIN JPL LoMP
(481532) 2007 LE	APO	0.53	0.36	2007	0.5	2.603	–	2012	0.18	–	1.4	33.504	BIN JPL LoMP
(488453) 1994 XD	APO	0.62	0.25	1994	0.6	2.736	–	2005	0.15+	–	0.6	17.976	BIN JPL LoMP
(489486) 2007 GS3	APO	1.067	0.46	2007	0.97	3.497	–	2019	0.45	41.36	3.2	41.36	BIN JPL LoMP
(494658) 2000 UG11	APO	0.29	0.5	2000	0.26	4.44	–	2000	0.13	–	0.426	18.4	BIN JPL LoMP
(523625) 2008 DG17	APO	0.38	–	2008	0.38	–	–	2013	–	–	–	–	BIN JPL LoMP
(523775) 2014 YB35	APO	0.34	0.5-	2014	0.3	–	–	2015	0.15-	–	–	–	BIN JPL LoMP
(741081) 2005 LW3	APO	0.40	0.25	2005	0.40	3.6	–	2022	0.1	–	4	–	BIN JPL
(49494) 1999 CJ1	APO	0.21-	1	1994	0.15-	30	–	2014	0.15-	–	0.525	30	BIN JPL LoMP
(612098) 1999 RM45	APO	0.181	0.45	1999	0.165	3.0697	–	2021	0.074	–	0.29	16.4448	BIN JPL LoMP
2002 BM26	AMO	0.61	0.167	2002	0.6	2.7	–	2002	0.1	–	1.4	25.8	BIN JPL
2002 KK8	AMO	0.51	0.2	2002	0.5	–	–	2002	0.1	–	–	–	BIN JPL
2003 SS84	APO	0.13	0.5	2003	0.12	–	–	2003	0.06	–	0.27	24	BIN JPL
(613286) 2005 YQ96	ATE	0.27	–	2005	0.27	rot.	–	2014	–	–	–	–	BIN JPL LoMP
2007 DT103	APO	0.31	0.267	2007	0.3	2.703	–	2007	0.08+	–	0.45	13.44	BIN JPL
2013 PY6	AMO	0.53	0.24	2013	0.52	3.6246	–	2020	0.12	–	1.2	27.312	BIN JPL
2013 WT44	APO	1.32	–	2013	1	2.8849	–	2014	–	–	–	–	BIN JPL
2014 WZ120	APO	0.3	0.32+	2014	0.3	3.361	–	2014	0.1	–	0.5	13.665	BIN JPL
2015 TD144	APO	0.1	–	2015	0.1	–	–	2015	–	–	–	–	BIN JPL
2016 AZ8	APO	0.47	0.43	2016	0.42	7-	–	2019	0.18-	<40	0.42+	7.2	BIN JPL
2017 RV1	APO	0.3	–	2017	0.3	–	–	2017	–	–	–	–	BIN JPL
2017 YE5	APO	1.3	1	2017	0.9	20.6	–	2018	0.9	–	2.4	22.08	BIN JPL
2018 EB	APO	0.24	0.167	2018	0.24	1.2	–	2018	0.04	–	–	–	BIN JPL
2018 TF3	APO	0.28	0.23	2018	0.27	2.4398	–	2018	0.06	2.3498	0.35	10.512	BIN JPL
2020 AZ2	AMO	0.19	–	2020	0.19	–	–	2020	–	–	–	–	BIN JPL
(809875) 2020 BX12	APO	0.18	0.42	2020	0.165	2.8	–	2020	0.07	<49	0.36	47.04	BIN JPL

back to summary

=== Mars crossers ===
This is a list of Mars-crossing asteroids with companions. Candidate binaries with an unconfirmed status are displayed on a dark background. For an overview, see summary and introduction.

System					Primary		Secondary					Refs
Designation	Class	D_{e} (km)	s/p-ratio	YOD	D_{p} (km)	RT_{p} (hours)	Designation	YOD	D_{s} (km)	a_{s} (km)	P_{s} (hours)	Refs
1139 Atami	cls.	7.81	0.833	1929	6	27.45	–	2005	5	15+	27.456	BIN JPL LoMP
1656 Suomi	H	7.86	0.26+	1942	7.61	2.5885	–	2020	1.98+	30	57.92	BIN JPL LoMP
1727 Mette	cls.	10.4	0.21	1965	10.18	2.98109	–	2013	2.14	21	20.99	BIN JPL LoMP
2044 Wirt	cls.	6.66	0.25	1950	6.46	3.6898	–	2006	1.62	12	18.9696	BIN JPL LoMP
2449 Kenos	cls.	6.2	0.23	1978	6	3.8481	–	2015	1.4	10	15.84	BIN JPL LoMP
2577 Litva	cls.	4.4	0.35; 0.3	1975	4	2.813	–	2009	1.4	21	35.88	BIN JPL LoMP
2577 Litva	cls.	4.4	0.35; 0.3	1975	4	2.813	S/2012 (2577) 1	2012	1.2	378	5136	BIN JPL LoMP
3873 Roddy	cls.	7.51	0.27	1984	7.25	2.47900	–	2012	1.96	14	19.24	BIN JPL LoMP
4435 Holt	cls.	5.03	0.34+	1983	4.76	2.867	–	2017	1.62+	16	42.648	BIN JPL LoMP
5261 Eureka	cls.	1.28	0.39+	1990	1.19	2.6902	–	2011	0.46	2.1	16.9296	BIN JPL LoMP
(5407) 1992 AX	cls.	3.98	0.2	1992	3.9	2.549	–	1997	0.78	5.8	13.5192	BIN JPL LoMP
7002 Bronshten	cls.	3.12	0.24+	1971	3.03	2.67025	–	2018	0.73+	4.5	13.32	BIN JPL LoMP
7369 Gavrilin	cls.	7.92	0.32+	1975	7.54	49.12	–	2007	2.41	27	49.128	BIN JPL LoMP
8373 Stephengould	unus.	5.48	0.27-	1992	5.29	4.435	–	2010	1.43	15	34.152	BIN JPL LoMP
12008 Kandrup	cls.	4.2	0.75	1996	3.4	32.9034	–	2016	2.6	10	32.904	BIN JPL LoMP
13920 Montecorvino	cls.	2.81	0.22+	1985	2.81	2.20231	–	2020	–	–	15.475	BIN JPL LoMP
(15700) 1987 QD	cls.	4.15	0.31	1987	3.96	3.0586	–	2010	1.23	14	50.4	BIN JPL LoMP
(16635) 1993 QO	cls.	4.77	0.27+	1993	4.61	7.622	–	2007	1.24	12	32.256	BIN JPL LoMP
(23621) 1996 PA	cls.	2.5	0.27+	1996	2.4	2.6649	–	2017	0.65	5	20.60	BIN JPL LoMP
24495 Degroff	cls.	3.5	–	2001	3.26	24.083	–	2017	–	–	2.7375	BIN JPL LoMP
26074 Carlwirtz	cls.	3.62	–	1977	3.62	2.4593	–	2013	–	6.1	16.1112	BIN JPL LoMP
26471 Tracybecker	cls.	6.05	0.36	2000	5.69	2.687	–	2009	2.05	18	39.288	BIN JPL LoMP
(32039) 2000 JO23	cls.	4.15	0.32+	2000	3.96	6.5979	–	2007	1.27	53	360	BIN JPL LoMP
(34706) 2001 OP83	cls.	3.62	0.28	2001	3.48	2.5644	–	2005	0.98	7	20.76	BIN JPL LoMP
(51356) 2000 RY76	cls.	3.3	0.21+	2000	3.23	2.5572	–	2012	0.68	13	62.04	BIN JPL LoMP
(53432) 1999 UT55	cls.	2.62	0.23+	1999	2.55	3.330	–	2013	0.59	4	14.1	BIN JPL LoMP
(54697) 2001 FA70	cls.	3.3	0.19+	2001	3.2	2.7077	–	2016	0.6	–	16.2648	BIN JPL LoMP
(99913) 1997 CZ5	cls.	6.89	0.19	1997	6.77	2.83507	–	2010	1.29	11	14.6808	BIN JPL LoMP
100015 Sutcliffe	cls.	2.4	0.35	1989	2.3	2.4172	–	2018	0.8	4.5	20.65	BIN JPL LoMP
(114319) 2002 XD58	cls.	2.62	–	2002	2.19	2.9649	–	2005	–	–	7.954	BIN JPL LoMP
(218144) 2002 RL66	cls.	2.97	–	2002	–	587	–	2010	–	–	–	BIN JPL LoMP

back to summary

=== Main-belt asteroids ===
This is a list of main-belt asteroids with companions. Candidate binaries with an unconfirmed status are displayed on a dark background. For an overview, see summary and introduction.

System					Primary		Secondary					Refs
Designation	Class	D_{e} (km)	s/p-ratio	YOD	D_{p} (km)	RT_{p} (hours)	Designation	YOD	D_{s} (km)	a_{s} (km)	P_{s} (hours)	Refs
22 Kalliope	–	168.5	0.168	1852	166.2	4.1482	Linus; S/2001 (22) 1	2001	28	1095	86.304	BIN JPL; LoMP
31 Euphrosyne	EUP	267.08	0.025	1854	267.08	5.53	–	2019	6.7	677	28.8	BIN JPL; LoMP
41 Daphne	–	174	0.011	1856	174	5.9880	Peneius; S/2008 (41) 1	2008	2-	443	26.4	BIN JPL; LoMP
44 Nysa	Nysa-Polana complex	75	0.013	1857	75	6.421	–	2026	1	180	23	BIN JPL; LoMP
45 Eugenia	–	206	0.034; 0.024	1857	206	5.699	Petit-Prince; S/1998 (45) 1 (Eugenia I)	1998	7	1164	113.18	BIN JPL; LoMP
45 Eugenia	–	206	0.034; 0.024	1857	206	5.699	S/2004 (45) 1	2004	5	611	43.03	BIN JPL; LoMP
87 Sylvia	SYL	286	0.038; 0.037	1866	286	5.1836	Romulus; S/2001 (87) (Sylvia I)	2001	10.8	1351	87.696	BIN JPL; LoMP
87 Sylvia	SYL	286	0.038; 0.037	1866	286	5.1836	Remus; S/2004 (87) (Sylvia II)	2004	10.6	701.6	32.952	BIN JPL; LoMP
90 Antiope	THM	121	0.954	1866	87.8	16.505	–	2000	87.8	171	16.505	BIN JPL; LoMP
93 Minerva	GEF	141.6	0.028; 0.021	1867	141.6	5.9818	Aegis; S/2009 (93) 1 (Minerva I)	2009	3.6	623.5	57.744	BIN JPL; LoMP
93 Minerva	GEF	141.6	0.028; 0.021	1867	141.6	5.9818	Gorgoneion; S/2009 (93) 2 (Minerva II)	2009	3.2	375	26.7528	BIN JPL; LoMP
107 Camilla	SYL	219.37	0.073; 0.016	1868	219.37	4.8439	S/2001 (107) 1	2001	16	1250	89.328	BIN JPL; LoMP
107 Camilla	SYL	219.37	0.073; 0.016	1868	219.37	4.8439	S/2016 (107) 1	2016	3.5	340	12	BIN JPL; LoMP
121 Hermione	–	190	0.171	1872	187	5.551	S/2002 (121) 1	2002	13	747	61.512	BIN JPL; LoMP
130 Elektra	–	199	0.03; 0.01; 0.008	1873	199	5.2247	S/2003 (130) 1	2003	6.0	1298	126.9	BIN JPL; LoMP
130 Elektra	–	199	0.03; 0.01; 0.008	1873	199	5.2247	S/2014 (130) 1	2014	2.0	498	30.14	BIN JPL; LoMP
130 Elektra	–	199	0.03; 0.01; 0.008	1873	199	5.2247	–	2014	1.6	345	16.8	BIN JPL; LoMP
216 Kleopatra	–	135	0.066; 0.051	1880	135	5.38528	Alexhelios; S/2008 (216) 1 (Kleopatra I)	2008	8.9	678	55.68	BIN JPL; LoMP
216 Kleopatra	–	135	0.066; 0.051	1880	135	5.38528	Cleoselene; S/2008 (216) 2 (Kleopatra II)	2008	6.9	454	29.76	BIN JPL; LoMP
243 Ida	KOR	31.4	0.045	1884	31.4	4.6336	Dactyl (Ida I)	1993	1.4	108	36.96	BIN JPL; LoMP
283 Emma	EMA	134.7	0.067	1889	134.7	6.888	S/2003 (283) 1	2003	9	581	80.472	BIN JPL; LoMP
317 Roxane	–	20.56	0.267	1891	19.86	8.169	Olympias; S/2009 (317) 1 (Roxane I)	2009	5.3	257	336	BIN JPL; LoMP
379 Huenna	THM	87.47	0.066	1894	87.47	7.022	S/2003 (379) 1	2003	5.8	3336	2102	BIN JPL; LoMP
702 Alauda	ALA	201.96	0.017	1910	201.96	8.354	Pichi üñëm S/2007 (702) 1	2007	3.51	1227	117.9	BIN JPL; LoMP
761 Brendelia
762 Pulcova	–	143	0.134	1913	141.72	5.839	–	2000	19	703	106.51	BIN JPL; LoMP
809 Lundia	FLO	9.1	0.89	1915	6.9	15.418	–	2005	6.1	15.8	15.418	BIN JPL; LoMP
854 Frostia	–	7.84	0.724	1916	6.35	37.728	–	2004	4.6	17	37.73	BIN JPL; LoMP
939 Isberga	–	12.9	0.29	1920	12.4	2.9170	–	2006	3.6	33	26.630	BIN JPL; LoMP
1016 Anitra	FLO	9.54	–	1924	9.54	5.9295	–	2016	–	–	–	BIN JPL; LoMP
1052 Belgica	FLO	10.41	0.36+	1925	9.79	2.7097	–	2012	3.53	34	47.26	BIN JPL; LoMP
1089 Tama	–	12.92	0.685	1927	10.7	16.444	–	2003	7.33	20.7	16.445	BIN JPL; LoMP
1313 Berna	–	13.5	0.79	1933	10.6	25.464	–	2004	8.37	25	25.464	BIN JPL; LoMP
1333 Cevenola	EUN	17.15	0.35	1934	17.15	4.88	–	2008	–	–	–	BIN JPL; LoMP
1338 Duponta	FLO	7.88	0.23	1934	7.68	3.8545	–	2007	1.77	14	17.57	BIN JPL; LoMP
1344 Caubeta	–	5.84	–	1935	5.84	3.122	–	2011	–	–	–	BIN JPL; LoMP
1453 Fennia	H	7.23	0.28+	1938	6.96	4.4121	–	2007	1.95	15	22.9896	BIN JPL; LoMP
1509 Esclangona	H	8.17	0.331	1938	7.76	3.253	S/2003 (1509) 1	2003	2.57	140	552	BIN JPL; LoMP
1526 Mikkeli	–	5.32	0.2	1939	5.22	2.9341	–	2020	1.04	8.8	15.9792	BIN JPL LoMP
1626 Sadeya	–	15.14	0.26	1927	14.65	3.4202	–	2020	3.81	54	51.312	BIN JPL LoMP
1717 Arlon	–	9.13	–	1954	9.13	5.148	–	2005	–	17	18.235	BIN JPL; LoMP
1770 Schlesinger	–	10.61	–	1967	10.61	2.8804	–	2016	–	–	–	BIN JPL; LoMP
1798 Watts	FLO	6.63	–	1949	6.63	–	–	2017	–	–	–	BIN JPL; LoMP
1803 Zwicky	PHO	9.93	0.26	1967	9.61	2.7329	–	2021	2.50	24	28.459	BIN JPL LoMP
1830 Pogson	FLO	8.28	0.32+	1968	7.89	2.57	–	2007	2.52	18	24.24	BIN JPL; LoMP
1934 Jeffers	PHO	9.24	–	1972	9.24	6.0427	–	2020	–	15	15.014	BIN JPL; LoMP
2006 Polonskaya	FLO	4.62	0.22+	1973	4.51	3.118	–	2005	0.99	8.5	19.1496	BIN JPL; LoMP
2019 van Albada	FLO	7.86	0.26+	1935	7.61	2.7294	–	2019	1.98+	14	17.982	BIN JPL LoMP
2047 Smetana	H	3.07	0.21+	1971	3	2.497	–	2012	0.63	6.3	22.4304	BIN JPL; LoMP
2070 Humason	–	4.57	0.31	1964	4.37	3.1883	–	2018	1.35	17	53.50	BIN JPL; LoMP
2121 Sevastopol	FLO	9.32	0.41	1971	8.62	2.9064	–	2010	3.54	26	37.104	BIN JPL; LoMP
2131 Mayall	H	8.56	0.26+	1975	8.28	2.568	–	2009	2.15	18	23.4792	BIN JPL; LoMP
2178 Kazakhstania	–	4.31	0.26	1972	4.17	3.0183	–	2018	1.08	8	18.50	BIN JPL; LoMP
2242 Balaton	–	6.13	0.25+	1936	5.95	2.7979	–	2015	1.49+	9	12.96	BIN JPL; LoMP
2337 Boubín	–	8.01	0.16+	1976	7.91	2.53163	–	2018	1.27+	13	16.09	BIN JPL; LoMP
2343 Siding Spring	NYS	5.2	0.19+	1979	5.11	2.10637	–	2015	0.97+	7	11.78904	BIN JPL; LoMP
2478 Tokai	FLO	9.98	0.72+	1981	8.1	25.885	–	2007	5.83	21	25.896	BIN JPL; LoMP
2486 Metsähovi	–	8.42	–	1939	8.42	4.4518	–	2007	–	–	–	BIN JPL; LoMP
2491 Tvashtri	H	3.259	0.24+	1977	3.17	4.0852	–	2018	0.76+	7.5	26.71	BIN JPL; LoMP
2516 Roman	–	4.408	0.23	1964	4.3	2.6266	–	2019	0.99	7.3	16.2192	BIN JPL LoMP
2535 Hämeenlinna	–	9.42	0.22+	1939	9.2	3.23106	–	2015	2.0+	19	21.2304	BIN JPL; LoMP
2602 Moore	–	9.6	0.28	1982	9.2	3.46723	–	2019	2.6	22	27.455	BIN JPL LoMP
2623 Zech	–	7.92	0.29+	1919	7.61	2.7401	–	2014	2.21+	48	117.19	BIN JPL; LoMP
2691 Sersic	–	5.44	0.43+	1974	5	3.8811	–	2011	2.15	12	26.808	BIN JPL; LoMP
2754 Efimov	–	6.58	0.2	1966	6.46	2.4497	–	2006	1.29	10	14.7648	BIN JPL; LoMP
2815 Soma	FLO	7.16	0.25	1982	6.95	2.73325	–	2011	1.74	13	17.916	BIN JPL; LoMP
2825 Crosby	–	5.06	0.18+	1938	4.98	2.8135	–	2017	0.9+	–	14.3496	BIN JPL; LoMP
2873 Binzel	FLO	6.43	0.25+	1982	6.24	2.7037	–	2019	1.56+	n.a.	44.58	BIN JPL; LoMP
2881 Meiden	–	5.67	–	1983	5.67	3.48	–	2017	–	–	–	BIN JPL; LoMP
3034 Climenhaga	–	9.97	–	1917	9.97	2.73749	–	2009	–	19	18.9552	BIN JPL; LoMP
3073 Kursk	FLO	6.89	0.25	1979	6.69	3.4468	–	2006	1.67	22	44.952	BIN JPL; LoMP
3169 Ostro	H	5.15	0.87	1981	3.89	6.509	–	2005	3.38	5.2	6.5088	BIN JPL; LoMP
3309 Brorfelde	H	5.04	0.26	1982	4.88	2.5041	–	2005	1.27	9	18.48	BIN JPL; LoMP
3378 Susanvictoria	–	6.64	0.24+	1922	6.46	2.5621	–	2017	1.55+	11	17.1312	BIN JPL; LoMP
3390 Demanet	FLO	5.06	0.26	1984	4.9	2.59457	–	2021	1.27	14	37.14	BIN JPL LoMP
3433 Fehrenbach	–	7.74	0.31	1963	7.4	3.916	–	2015	2.3	14	19.6656	BIN JPL; LoMP
3523 Arina	–	9.07	0.24+	1975	8.82	2.6742	–	2021	2.12+	22	29.261	BIN JPL LoMP
3623 Chaplin	KOR	11.1	–	1981	11.1	8.361	–	2008	–	–	–	BIN JPL; LoMP
3673 Levy	–	6.41	0.28	1985	6.17	2.688	–	2007	1.73	13	21.6	BIN JPL; LoMP
3703 Volkonskaya	V	3.73	0.4	1978	3.46	3.235	–	2005	1.39	7.8	24	BIN JPL; LoMP
3749 Balam	FLO	4.66	0.466; 0.42	1982	3.95	2.80483	S/2002 (3749) 1	2002	1.84	289	1464	BIN JPL; LoMP
3749 Balam	FLO	4.66	0.466; 0.42	1982	3.95	2.80483	–	2008	1.66	20	33.384	BIN JPL; LoMP
3782 Celle	V	5.92	0.43	1986	5.44	3.839	–	2003	2.34	18	36.576	BIN JPL; LoMP
3792 Preston	PHO	5.16	–	1985	5.16	2.9277	–	2016	–	–	46.8	BIN JPL; LoMP
3657 Ermolova	V	6.66	0.14	1978	6.6	2.60655	–	2020	0.92	9.4	12.540	BIN JPL; LoMP
3841 Dicicco	FLO	6.25	0.28+	1983	6.02	3.5949	–	2014	1.67+	12	21.6288	BIN JPL; LoMP
3865 Lindbloom	V	7.97	0.65+	1988	6.68-	26.016	–	2020	4.34+	17	26.016	BIN JPL LoMP
3868 Mendoza	–	9.35	0.22	1960	9.13	2.7709	–	2009	2.01	20	24.384	BIN JPL; LoMP
3905 Doppler	–	7.91	0.77+	1984	6.27	50.8	–	2013	4.83	26	50.808	BIN JPL; LoMP
3912 Troja	–	5.93	0.33	1988	5.63	3.6594	–	2021	1.86	10	17.371	BIN JPL; LoMP
3951 Zichichi	–	6.72	0.33+	1986	6.38	3.3942	–	2006	2.11	16	27.6	BIN JPL; LoMP
3982 Kastelʹ	–	6.79	–	1984	6.79	5.835	–	2005	–	–	–	BIN JPL; LoMP
4029 Bridges	–	8.02	0.24	1982	7.8	3.5746	–	2006	1.87	13	16.3104	BIN JPL; LoMP
4030 Archenhold	–	6.97	0.31+	1984	6.66	3.27292	–	2020	2.06+	12	15.9739	BIN JPL; LoMP
4092 Tyr	–	7.6	0.45+	1986	7.6	16.0875	–	2020	–	14	16.0875	BIN JPL; LoMP
4272 Entsuji	–	7.68	0.18	1977	7.56	2.8087	–	2015	1.36	13	15.9456	BIN JPL; LoMP
4288 Tokyotech	EUN	12.3	0.30+	1989	11.78	3.18	–	2019	3.53+	30	30.276	BIN JPL LoMP
4296 van Woerkom	FLO	7.6	0.3	1935	7.3	2.809	–	2016	2.2	17	26.232	BIN JPL; LoMP
4337 Arecibo	THM	19.69	0.53	1985	24.3	–	–	2021	13	48	19.2	BIN JPL; LoMP
4362 Carlisle	FLO	5.59	0.33+	1978	5.31-	2.63289	–	2021	1.75+	17	43.296	BIN JPL; LoMP
4383 Suruga	–	6.47	0.21+	1989	6.33	3.4068	–	2013	1.33	11	16.3872	BIN JPL; LoMP
4440 Tchantchès	H	2.09	0.25+	1984	2.03	2.78836	–	2005	0.51	3.8	18.6912	BIN JPL; LoMP
4492 Debussy	–	17.36	0.643	1988	14.6	26.606	–	2004	9.39	31	26.616	BIN JPL; LoMP
4514 Vilen	–	6.29	0.26	1972	6.09	2.8922	–	2015	1.58+	11	16.8504	BIN JPL; LoMP
4541 Mizuno	–	6.29	–	1989	6.29	5.261	–	2015	–	–	–	BIN JPL; LoMP
4607 Seilandfarm	–	7.39	0.29+	1987	7.1	3.9683	–	2009	2.06	19	31.632	BIN JPL; LoMP
4666 Dietz	–	6.83	0.34 –	1986	6.52	2.95242	–	2015	2.22+	18	33.192	BIN JPL; LoMP
4666 Dietz	–	6.83	0.34 –	1986	6.52	2.95242	–	2015	–	–	–	BIN JPL; LoMP
4674 Pauling	H	4.68	0.32	1989	4.46	2.521	S/2004 (4674) 1	2004	1.41	250	3120	BIN JPL; LoMP
4765 Wasserburg	H	1.78	0.16+	1986	1.76	3.6231	–	2013	0.28	2.9	15.9696	BIN JPL; LoMP
4786 Tatianina	–	3.28	0.19+	1985	3.22	2.9227	–	2006	0.61	6.6	21.6696	BIN JPL; LoMP
4788 Simpson	–	3.58	0.17+	1986	3.53	2.81752	–	2020	0.6+	5.7	14.981	BIN JPL LoMP
4868 Knushevia	H	1.535	0.13+	1989	1.52	3.1422	–	2015	0.2+	2.1	11.922	BIN JPL; LoMP
4951 Iwamoto	–	5.52	0.76+	1990	4.39	118.0	–	2007	3.34	31	118.0	BIN JPL; LoMP
5112 Kusaji	FLO	3.42	0.31	1987	3.27	2.7995	–	2016	1.01	7	20.74	BIN JPL; LoMP
5135 Nibutani	–	4.82	0.28	1990	4.64	2.818	–	2020	1.3	9.6	21.7368	BIN JPL LoMP
5402 Kejosmith	–	4.19	0.18+	1989	4.12	2.69549	–	2018	–	12	36.62	BIN JPL; LoMP
5425 Vojtěch	V	7.05	0.22	1984	6.89	2.64759	–	2015	1.52	16	25.4304	BIN JPL; LoMP
5426 Sharp	H	2.033	–	1985	2.033	4.5609	–	2014	–	4.5	24.2208	BIN JPL; LoMP
5474 Gingasen	V	5.05	–	1988	5.05	3.6242	–	2008	–	–	–	BIN JPL; LoMP
5477 Holmes	H	3.15	0.37	1989	2.95	2.9943	–	2005	1.09	6.7	24.43	BIN JPL; LoMP
5481 Kiuchi	V	7.92	0.33	1990	7.52	3.6196	–	2008	2.48	15	20.90	BIN JPL; LoMP
5500 Twilley	FLO	4.48	0.27+	1981	4.33	2.9554	–	2017	1.17+	7.8	17.556	BIN JPL LoMP
5536 Honeycutt	–	9.1	0.31	1955	8.7	3.583	–	2016	2.7	15	16.325	BIN JPL; LoMP
5674 Wolff	–	6.04	0.8+	1986	4.72	93.7	–	2015	3.78+	30	93.696	BIN JPL; LoMP
5772 Johnlambert	–	8	0.22+	1988	7.81	3.0782	–	2021	1.72+	14	17.98	BIN JPL; LoMP
5872 Sugano	–	6.33	0.3+	1989	6.06	3.3642	–	2016	1.82+	11	18.84	BIN JPL; LoMP
5899 Jedicke	H	2.67	0.32+	1986	2.54	2.748	–	2010	0.81	4.4	16.699	BIN JPL; LoMP
5905 Johnson	H	4.79	0.40	1989	4.45	3.7824	–	2005	1.78	9.3	21.785	BIN JPL; LoMP
6009 Yuzuruyoshii	–	10.32	0.29+	1990	9.91	3.03067	–	2021	2.87+	33	44.07	BIN JPL; LoMP
6016 Carnelli	–	3.53	0.2	1991	3.46	2.8028	–	2016	0.69	7	21.331	BIN JPL; LoMP
6084 Bascom	–	6.35	0.37	1985	5.96	2.745	–	2006	2.2	20	43.512	BIN JPL; LoMP
6100 Kunitomoikkansai	–	4.06	0.38+	1991	3.8	4.3018	–	2016	1.44+	7	18.46	BIN JPL; LoMP
6181 Bobweber	–	4.49	–	1986	4.49	2.75796	–	2008	–	–	–	BIN JPL; LoMP
6186 Zenon	–	6	0.28	1988	5.8	2.6832	–	2017	1.6	9.1	14.393	BIN JPL; LoMP
6244 Okamoto	–	6.89	0.25	1990	6.69	2.8958	–	2006	1.67	13	20.3208	BIN JPL; LoMP
6245 Ikufumi	–	8.1	0.23	1990	7.89	2.9222	–	2018	1.89	13	15.44	BIN JPL; LoMP
(6265) 1985 TW3	–	4.95	0.24	1985	4.81	2.709	–	2007	1.16	8	15.8592	BIN JPL; LoMP
(6369) 1983 UC	FLO	5.17	0.35	1983	4.9	2.9	–	2013	1.7	15–	39.8	BIN JPL; LoMP
6384 Kervin	H	3.74	0.3+	1989	3.6	3.6194	–	2015	1.1+	6.1	15.94	BIN JPL; LoMP
6615 Plutarchos	–	3.14	0.25	1960	3.05	2.3247	–	2007	0.76	9.7	40.03	BIN JPL; LoMP
6708 Bobbievaile	–	9.23	0.57+	1989	8.02	8.221	–	2009	4.57	19	24.696	BIN JPL; LoMP
7187 Isobe	H	6.05	0.17	1992	5.96	4.2427	–	2012	1.01	16	33.1	BIN JPL; LoMP
7225 Huntress	–	6.68	0.21	1983	6.54	2.4400	–	2007	1.37	10	14.6712	BIN JPL; LoMP
7307 Takei	–	10.1	0.24+	1994	9.8	2.74685	–	2021	2.6	19	20.0064	BIN JPL LoMP
7344 Summerfield	–	6.25	–	1992	6.25	–	–	2017	–	–	–	BIN JPL; LoMP
7393 Luginbuhl	FLO	5.47	0.4+	1984	5.08	2.68763	–	2017	2.03+	16	39.4224	BIN JPL; LoMP
(7792) 1995 WZ3	–	7.45	–	1995	7.45	3.16001	–	2021	–	–	–	BIN JPL; LoMP
7958 Leakey	H	2.94	0.30	1994	2.82	2.34843	–	2012	0.85	10	50.28	BIN JPL; LoMP
8026 Johnmckay	H	1.69	–	1991	1.69	372	–	2010	–	–	–	BIN JPL; LoMP
8077 Hoyle	–	12	–	1986	12	2.7454	–	2000	–	–	–	BIN JPL; LoMP
8116 Jeanperrin	FLO	4.77	0.33+	1996	4.53	3.6169	–	2007	1.49	13	36.144	BIN JPL; LoMP
8306 Shoko	FLO	3.46	0.40+	1995	3.21	3.350	–	2013	1.28	9.4	36.192	BIN JPL; LoMP
8474 Rettig	FLO	6	0.86+	1985	4.5	30.54	–	2015	3.9+	14	30.54	BIN JPL; LoMP
9069 Hovland	H	3.13	0.30+	1993	3	4.2175	–	2004	0.9	7.8	30.336	BIN JPL; LoMP
9260 Edwardolson	–	4.12	0.27	1953	3.98	3.0852	–	2005	1.07	7.2	17.784	BIN JPL; LoMP
(9332) 1990 SB1	EUN	6.18	0.26	1990	5.98	2.98701	–	2019	1.55	21	48.84	BIN JPL LoMP
9617 Grahamchapman	FLO	2.84	0.27	1993	2.74	2.2856	–	2006	0.74	5.2	19.3848	BIN JPL; LoMP
9783 Tensho-kan	–	5.33	0.35	1994	5.1	2.9	–	2013	1.8	13–	29.568	BIN JPL; LoMP
9972 Minoruoda	–	9.1	–	1993	–	–	–	2017	–	–	–	BIN JPL; LoMP
10123 Fideöja	–	3.48	0.35	1993	3.3	2.87	–	2013	1.2	13–	56.448	BIN JPL; LoMP
10132 Lummelunda	–	3.589	0.28+	1993	3.46	2.5099	–	2017	0.97+	7.3	22.44	BIN JPL; LoMP
10208 Germanicus	FLO	3.55	0.46	1997	3.23	3.34825	–	2007	1.48	13	58.56	BIN JPL; LoMP
(11217) 1999 JC4	H	3.3	–	1999	3.3	4.8219	–	2013	–	6.2	19.1712	BIN JPL; LoMP
11227 Ksenborisova	–	2.6	–	1999	2.6	2.61679	–	2017	–	–	–	BIN JPL; LoMP
11264 Claudiomaccone	–	4.2	0.31+	1979	4-	3.1872	–	2005	1.24+	6	15.1104	BIN JPL; LoMP
12326 Shirasaki	FLO	3.8	0.24	1992	3.7	2.7286	–	2016	0.9	8.4	25.056	BIN JPL; LoMP
13123 Tyson	PHO	10.87	–	1994	10.87	3.3303	–	2015	–	–	–	BIN JPL; LoMP
15107 Toepperwein	FLO	2.86	0.19+	2000	2.81	2.5327	–	2021	0.53+	5.4	19.6032	BIN JPL LoMP
15268 Wendelinefroger	NYS	3.97	0.27+	1990	3.83	2.4224	–	2008	1.03	8.7	25.08	BIN JPL; LoMP
(15430) 1998 UR31	–	3.74	–	1998	3.74	2.5273	–	2010	–	8.2	23.9592	BIN JPL; LoMP
15822 Genefahnestock	H	1.72	0.19+	1994	1.69	2.96	–	2010	0.32	3.3	20.1312	BIN JPL; LoMP
16525 Shumarinaiko	NYS	5.25	0.16+	1991	5.18	2.5932	–	2013	0.83	8.1	14.4096	BIN JPL; LoMP
(16694) 1995 AJ	FLO	4.06	0.23+	1995	3.96	3.6421	–	2020	0.91+	9	25.2792	BIN JPL LoMP
17081 Jaytee	–	4.52	0.26+	1999	4.37	2.8818	–	2021	1.137+	7.5	16.34	BIN JPL; LoMP
17246 Christophedumas	KOR	4.61	0.222	2000	4.5	5+	S/2004 (17246) 1	2004	1	228	2160	BIN JPL; LoMP
17260 Kušnirák	–	4.77	0.26	2000	4.62	3.1287	–	2006	1.2	7.4	14.7576	BIN JPL; LoMP
17700 Oleksiygolubov	–	3.45	0.31+	1997	3.29	3.8382	–	2018	1.02+	5.4	15.49	BIN JPL; LoMP
(18303) 1980 PU	–	4.38	0.24	1980	4.3	2.72627	–	2019	1	6.1	12.27	BIN JPL LoMP
(18503) 1996 PY4	PHO	3.529	0.24+	1996	3.43	3.4391	–	2021	0.82+	6.7	19.904	BIN JPL; LoMP
(18527) 1996 VJ30	V	3.35	0.32	1996	3.19	3.3529	–	2018	1.02	6	19.07	BIN JPL; LoMP
(18890) 2000 EV26	H	4	0.27+	2000	3.86	3.8216	–	2014	1.04+	6	14.2896	BIN JPL; LoMP
20325 Julianoey	–	4.94	0.3	1998	4.73	3.24474	–	2014	1.42	10	23.5	BIN JPL; LoMP
20882 Paulsánchez	NYS	4.4	–	2000	4.4	2.5586	–	2018	–	12	32.810	BIN JPL; LoMP
21436 Chaoyichi	–	1.95	–	1998	1.8	2.87	–	2014	0.6	0.35	–	BIN JPL; LoMP
21527 Horton	EUN	4.99	0.21+	1998	4.88	2.76762	–	2019	1.02+	8.7	17.44	BIN JPL LoMP
22899 Alconrad	KOR	5.68	0.222	1999	5.54	4.03	Juliekaibarreto; S/2003 (22899) 1	2003	1.23	182	1344	BIN JPL; LoMP
(24106) 1999 VA12	–	–	–	1999	–	–	–	2020	–	–	–	BIN JPL; LoMP
(24465) 2000 SX155	H	3.18	0.22+	2000	3.1	2.66087	–	2016	0.68	3.6	9.252	BIN JPL; LoMP
25015 Lairdclose	FLO	2.899	–	1998	2.9	–	–	2018	–	–	–	BIN JPL; LoMP
25021 Nischaykumar	–	2.1	0.28	1998	2	2.5344	–	2019	0.56	n.a.	23.496	BIN JPL; LoMP
(26416) 1999 XM84	–	4.56	–	1999	4.56	2.907	–	2015	–	–	–	BIN JPL; LoMP
(26420) 1999 XL103	–	2.02	0.34+	1999	1.91	3.2	–	2019	0.65+	n.a.	23.899	BIN JPL; LoMP
(27568) 2000 PT6	H	1.82	–	2000	1.82	3.4885	–	2013	–	3.1	16.356	BIN JPL; LoMP
27675 Paulmaley	PHO	5.09	–	1981	5.09	–	–	2017	–	–	–	BIN JPL; LoMP
31450 Stevepreston	–	10.62	0.22	1999	10.4	3.4116	–	2015	2.3	39	53.47	BIN JPL; LoMP
32008 Adriángalád	–	4.56	0.4+	2000	4.23	3.0171	–	2007	1.69	13	40.25	BIN JPL; LoMP
(38079) 1999 HF	PHO	3.4	–	1999	3.4	16.675	–	2020	–	–	–	BIN JPL; LoMP
(43008) 1999 UD31	–	2.5	0.35	1999	2.4	2.9	–	2014	0.8	–	–	BIN JPL; LoMP
(44620) 1999 RS43	–	2.62	0.35	1999	0.66	2.9	–	2014	0.2	2	–	BIN JPL; LoMP
46829 McMahon	–	3.3	0.4	1998	3.06	2.6236	–	2015	1.22	5.4	16.833	BIN JPL; LoMP
52316 Daveslater	H	3.3	0.16+	1992	3.26	2.7629	–	2012	0.52	4.9	13.44	BIN JPL; LoMP
(57202) 2001 QJ53	–	2.2	0.25+	2001	2.2	2.44482	–	2017	0.5+	5	24	BIN JPL; LoMP
69406 Martz-Kohl	H	3.18	0.19+	1995	3.12	4.486	–	2013	0.59	5.3	16.11	BIN JPL; LoMP
(72036) 2000 XM44	PHO	2.7	0.25+	2000	2.62	2.582	–	2019	0.66+	4.9	18.77	BIN JPL; LoMP
76818 Brianenke	H	3.84	0.37	2000	3.6	3.166	–	2005	1.33	5.6	14.12	BIN JPL; LoMP
79472 Chiorny	H	3.79	0.32	1998	3.79	2.8802	–	2012	–	9	25.94	BIN JPL; LoMP
(80218) 1999 VO123	–	1.58	0.3	1999	0.28	2.9	–	2012	0.08	0.9	33.1	BIN JPL; LoMP
152830 Dinkinesh	FLO	0.82	0.28	1999	0.76	52.67 ± 0.04	Selam (Dinkinesh I)	2023	0.22	?	?	BIN JPL; LoMP
(300163) 2006 VW139	–	2.6	1	2006	1.8	–	–	2011	1.8	104	3360	BIN JPL; LoMP

back to summary

The following binaries are double asteroids, with similarly sized components, and a barycenter outside of the larger object.

1. 90 Antiope – S/2000 (90) 1
2. 854 Frostia – undesignated
3. 1313 Berna – undesignated
4. 2478 Tokai – undesignated
5. 3169 Ostro – undesignated
6. 3749 Balam – S/2002 (3749) 1
7. 3905 Doppler – undesignated
8. 4674 Pauling – S/2004 (4674) 1
9. 4951 Iwamoto – undesignated
10. 5674 Wolff – undesignated
11. 8474 Rettig – undesignated
12. 17246 Christophedumas – S/2004 (17246) 1
13. (300163) 2006 VW139 – undesignated

In addition, these bodies might be double asteroids, but due to errors in their size and orbit, it is uncertain.

1. 809 Lundia – undesignated
2. 1089 Tama – undesignated
3. 1509 Esclangona – S/2003 (1509) 1
4. 4492 Debussy – undesignated
5. 11264 Claudiomaccone – undesignated
6. 22899 Alconrad – (22899) Alconrad I Juliekaibarreto

=== Jupiter trojans ===
This is a list of Jupiter trojans with companions. Candidate binaries with an unconfirmed status are displayed on a dark background. For an overview, see summary and introduction.

System					Primary		Secondary					Refs
Designation	Class	D_{e} (km)	s/p-ratio	YOD	D_{p} (km)	RT_{p} (hours)	Designation	YOD	D_{s} (km)	a_{s} (km)	P_{s} (hours)	Refs
617 Patroclus	L_{5}	145	0.924	1906	106	102.79	Menoetius (Patroclus I)	2001	98	680	102.792	BIN JPL LoMP
624 Hektor	L_{4}	250	0.048	1907	184	6.921	Skamandrios (Hektor I)	2006	12	957.5	71.162	BIN JPL LoMP
3548 Eurybates	L_{4}	63.9	0.013	1973	63.9	8.711	Queta (Eurybates I)	2018	0.8	2310	1982.4	BIN JPL LoMP
16974 Iphthime	L_{4}	57.3	0.767	1998	45.5	78.9	–	2013	34.9	179	78.96	BIN JPL LoMP
17365 Thymbraeus	L_{5}	42.6	0.843	1978	32.6	12.672	–	2005	27.5	43	12.672	BIN JPL LoMP
29314 Eurydamas	L_{5}	40	0.737	1994	32	15.035	–	2005	24	41	15.036	BIN JPL LoMP
15094 Polymele	L_{4}			1999	21		Shaun (temporary designation)	2022				

back to summary

=== Trans-Neptunian objects ===
This is a list of trans-Neptunian objects with companions. Candidate binaries with an unconfirmed status are displayed on a dark background. This list gives the companion's orbital period (P_{s}) in days rather than hours. For an overview, see summary and introduction.

System					Primary		Secondary					Refs
Designation	Class	D_{e} (km)	s/p-ratio	YOD	D_{p} (km)	RT_{p} (hours)	Designation	YOD	D_{s} (km)	a_{s} (km)	P_{s} (days)	Refs
(26308) 1998 SM165	1:2	280	0.302	1998	268	8.4	–	2001	81	11377	130.158	BIN JPL LoMP
38628 Huya	PLU	458	0.525	2000	406	5.28	Moon of 38628 Huya	2012	213	1740	3.2	BIN JPL LoMP
42355 Typhon	SDO	185	0.55	2002	162	9.67	Echidna (Typhon I)	2006	89	1580	18.982	BIN JPL LoMP
47171 Lempo	PLU	393	0.486; 0.927	1999	272	45.763	Paha (Lempo I)	2001	132	7411	50.3	BIN JPL LoMP
47171 Lempo	PLU	393	0.486; 0.927	1999	272	45.763	Hiisi (Lempo II)	2007	251	867	1.907	BIN JPL LoMP
(48639) 1995 TL8	SDO	194	0.457	1995	176	–	–	2002	80	420	1.4	BIN JPL LoMP
50000 Quaoar	CUB	1074	0.133	2002	1097.6±2.2	17.68	Weywot (Quaoar I)	2006	146±10	13329	12.43	BIN JPL LoMP
55637 Uni	CUB	697	0.316	2002	665	14.382	Tinia (Uni I)	2007	210	4770	8.309	BIN JPL LoMP
58534 Logos	CUB	106	0.766	1997	82	–	Zoe (Logos I)	2001	67	8217	309.87	BIN JPL LoMP
(60458) 2000 CM114	SDO	211	0.769	2000	167	–	–	2006	128	2200	15	BIN JPL LoMP
(60621) 2000 FE8	2:5	183	0.759	2000	146	–	–	2007	111	1180	7.5	BIN JPL LoMP
65489 Ceto	SDO	281	0.764	2003	223	4.43	Phorcys (Ceto I)	2006	171	1840	9.554	BIN JPL LoMP
66652 Borasisi	CUB	163	0.817	1999	126	6.4	Pabu (Borasisi I)	2003	103	4528	46.2888	BIN JPL LoMP
79360 Sila–Nunam	CUB	343	0.944	1997	249	300.2388	Nunam	2002	236	2777	12.51	BIN JPL LoMP
(80806) 2000 CM105	CUB	201	0.759	2000	160	–	–	2002	121	2700	23	BIN JPL LoMP
(82075) 2000 YW134	3:8	229	0.347	2000	216	–	–	2002	75	1900	10	BIN JPL LoMP
(82157) 2001 FM185	CUB	183	0.867	2001	138	–	–	2008	120	3130	33	BIN JPL LoMP
88611 Teharonhiawako	CUB	220	0.724	2001	178	9.505	Sawiskera (Teharonhiawako I)	2001	129	27670	828.76	BIN JPL LoMP
90482 Orcus	PLU	958	0.31	2004	917	13.18841	Vanth (Orcus I)	2005	442	9006	9.539	BIN JPL LoMP
(119067) 2001 KP76	CUB	211	0.955	2001	153	–	–	2007	146	8900	130	BIN JPL LoMP
(119979) 2002 WC19	1:2	461	0.316	2002	440	–	–	2006	139	4090	8.403	BIN JPL LoMP
120347 Salacia	CUB	901	0.344	2004	854	6.5	Actaea (Salacia I)	2006	286	5619	5.4938	BIN JPL LoMP
(123509) 2000 WK183	CUB	146	0.951	2000	106	–	–	2005	101	2366	30.917	BIN JPL LoMP
134340 Pluto	PLU	2376	0.511; 0.018; 0.016; 0.012; 0.0025	1930	2380	153.2935	Charon (Pluto I)	1978	1212	19573	6.3872	BIN JPL LoMP
134340 Pluto	PLU	2376	0.511; 0.018; 0.016; 0.012; 0.0025	1930	2380	153.2935	Nix (Pluto II)	2005	38	48694	24.8546	BIN JPL LoMP
134340 Pluto	PLU	2376	0.511; 0.018; 0.016; 0.012; 0.0025	1930	2380	153.2935	Hydra (Pluto III)	2005	39	64738	38.2018	BIN JPL LoMP
134340 Pluto	PLU	2376	0.511; 0.018; 0.016; 0.012; 0.0025	1930	2380	153.2935	Kerberos (Pluto IV)	2011	13	57783	32.1676	BIN JPL LoMP
134340 Pluto	PLU	2376	0.511; 0.018; 0.016; 0.012; 0.0025	1930	2380	153.2935	Styx (Pluto V)	2012	11	42656	20.1616	BIN JPL LoMP
(134860) 2000 OJ67	CUB	175	0.783	2000	138	–	–	2003	108	2270	22.0584	BIN JPL LoMP
136108 Haumea	HAU	1425	0.232; 0.116	2003	1379	3.9154	Hiʻiaka (Haumea I)	2005	320	49880	49.462	BIN JPL LoMP
136108 Haumea	HAU	1425	0.232; 0.116	2003	1379	3.9154	Namaka (Haumea II)	2005	170	25657	18.2783	BIN JPL LoMP
136199 Eris	SDO	2326	0.301	2003	2326	378.6	Dysnomia (Eris I)	2005	615	37460	15.7859	BIN JPL LoMP
136472 Makemake	CUB	1440	0.122	2005	1430	7.771	S/2015 (136472) 1	2015	130	21100+	12.4	BIN JPL LoMP
(139775) 2001 QG298	PLU	179	0.867	2001	135	13.7744	–	2003	117	172	0.5739	BIN JPL LoMP
148780 Altjira	CUB	331	0.899	2001	246	–	–	2006	221	9904	139.56	BIN JPL LoMP
(160091) 2000 OL67	CUB	74	0.759	2000	153	–	–	2007	56	7695	347.085	BIN JPL LoMP
(160256) 2002 PD149	CUB	242	0.832	2002	186	–	–	2007	155	24400	470	BIN JPL LoMP
174567 Varda	CUB	792	0.513	2003	705	5.91	Ilmarë (Varda I)	2009	361	4800	5.7508	BIN JPL LoMP
(182933) 2002 GZ31	SDO	231	0.631	2002	195	–	–	2006	123	2060	12	BIN JPL LoMP
208996 Achlys	PLU	727	0.1	2003	723	13.44	–	2005	72	7200	12	BIN JPL LoMP
225088 Gonggong	3:10	1230	0.2	2007	1535	44.81	Xiangliu (Gonggong I)	2010	95	15000	6	BIN JPL LoMP
229762 Gǃkúnǁʼhòmdímà	SDO	599	0.175	2007	590	11.05	Gǃòʼé ǃHú (Gǃkúnǁʼhòmdímà I)	2008	71	3600	5.9	BIN JPL LoMP
(275809) 2001 QY297	CUB	229	0.912	2001	169	11.68	–	2006	154	9960	138.11	BIN JPL LoMP
(303712) 2005 PR21	CUB	265	0.603	2005	227	–	–	2007	137	3600	22	BIN JPL LoMP
341520 Mors–Somnus	PLU	141	0.955	2007	102	9.28	Somnus	2007	97	21040	971.7	BIN JPL LoMP
(364171) 2006 JZ81	CUB	145	0.637	2006	122	–	–	2006	78	33000	1500	BIN JPL LoMP
385446 Manwë	4:7	185	0.58	2003	160	–	Thorondor (Manwë I)	2006	92	6674	110.176	BIN JPL LoMP
(469420) 2001 XP254	3:5	133	0.711	2001	108	–	–	2008	77	1200	12	BIN JPL LoMP
(469505) 2003 FE128	1:2	221	0.735	2003	178	5.85	–	2010	131	2140	14	BIN JPL LoMP
(469509) 2003 HC57	CUB	306	0.95	2003	222	–	–	2020	211	1960	–	BIN JPL LoMP
(469514) 2003 QA91	CUB	260	0.955	2003	188	–	–	2006	180	1900	9.1	BIN JPL LoMP
(469610) 2004 HF79	CUB	242	0.81	2004	188	–	–	2019	153	3820	29	BIN JPL LoMP
469705 ǂKá̦gára	CUB	174	0.762	2005	138	9.65	ǃHãunu (ǂKá̦gára I)	2009	105	7700	128.11	BIN JPL LoMP
(505447) 2013 SQ99	CUB	231	0.81	2013	180	–	–	2017	146	13300	200	BIN JPL LoMP
(505476) 2013 UL15	CUB	212	0.79	2013	166	–	–	2019	131	5370	59	BIN JPL LoMP
(506121) 2016 BP81	CUB	253	0.90	2016	188	6.85	–	2017	169	11300	140	BIN JPL LoMP
(508788) 2000 CQ114	CUB	175	0.871	2000	132	–	–	2003	115	6930	220.7	BIN JPL LoMP
(508869) 2002 VT130	CUB	324	0.817	2002	251	–	–	2008	205	2490	9.8	BIN JPL LoMP
(511551) 2014 UD225	CUB	201	0.35	2013	190	–	–	2017	66	21400	460	BIN JPL LoMP
(523624) 2008 CT190	SDO	350	0.83	2008	270	–	–	2012	220	1300	3.3	BIN JPL LoMP
(523764) 2014 WC510	PLU	227	0.76	2011	181	–	–	2018	138	349	0.87	BIN JPL LoMP
(523983) 1999 RY214	CUB	146	0.605	1999	125	–	–	2008	76	1500	15	BIN JPL LoMP
(524217) 2001 RZ143	CUB	140	0.832	2001	108	–	–	2001	90	1560	17	BIN JPL LoMP
(524366) 2001 XR254	CUB	221	0.826	2001	171	–	–	2006	140	9310	125.58	BIN JPL LoMP
(524531) 2002 XH91	CUB	350	0.619	2002	298	–	–	2008	185	19900	190	BIN JPL LoMP
(525462) 2005 EO304	CUB	171	0.513	2005	152.4	–	–	2005	78	69800	3579	BIN JPL LoMP
532037 Chiminigagua	SDO	765	0.25	2013	740	–	–	2018	190	9800	15	BIN JPL LoMP
1998 WV24	CUB	146	0.871	1998	110	–	–	2007	96	1420	14	BIN JPL uTNO
1998 WW31	CUB	192	0.833	1998	148	–	S/2000 (1998 WW_{31}) 1	2000	123	22620	587.3	BIN JPL uTNO
(612095) 1999 OJ4	CUB	104	0.96	1999	75	–	–	2002	72	3267	84.12	BIN JPL LoMP
1999 RT214	CUB	121	0.689	1999	100	–	–	2006	69	3310	64	BIN JPL uTNO
(612141) 1999 XY143	CUB	278	0.839	1999	213	–	–	2008	179	2670	14	BIN JPL LoMP
(612147) 2000 CF105	CUB	81	0.78	2000	63.6	–	–	2002	50	33300	3989	BIN JPL LoMP
(612176) 2000 QL251	1:2	206	0.967	2000	148	–	–	2006	143	5002	56.451	BIN JPL LoMP
(612203) 2000 WT169	CUB	265	0.82	2000	205	–	–	2008	168	2600	14	BIN JPL LoMP
2001 FL185	CUB	167	0.617	2001	142	–	–	2006	88	1900	17	BIN JPL uTNO
(612239) 2001 QC298	CUB	303	0.817	2001	235	7.78	–	2002	192	3813	19.23	BIN JPL LoMP
(612242) 2001 QQ322	CUB	231	0.912	2001	171	–	–	2007	156	3890	32	BIN JPL LoMP
2001 QW322	CUB	180	0.986	2001	128	–	–	2001	126	102100	6280	BIN JPL uTNO
2002 VF130	CUB	160	0.867	2002	121	–	–	2008	105	22400	760	BIN JPL uTNO
(612549) 2003 HG57	CUB	221	1	2003	156	–	–	2010	156	13200	210	BIN JPL LoMP
2003 QY90	CUB	114	0.986	2003	81	3.4	–	2003	80	8549	309.7	BIN JPL uTNO
(612578) 2003 QR91	CUB	280	0.912	2003	207	–	–	2007	189	1790	7.5	BIN JPL LoMP
2003 TJ58	CUB	83	0.787	2003	65	–	–	2006	51	3840	137.68	BIN JPL uTNO
(612687) 2003 UN284	CUB	149	0.667	2003	124	–	–	2003	83	54000	3180	BIN JPL LoMP
(612719) 2003 WU188	CUB	220-	0.724	2003	178	–	–	2007	129	1300	6.5	BIN JPL LoMP
2003 YS179	CUB	167	0.871	2003	126	–	–	2008	110	7830	150	BIN JPL uTNO
(612733) 2003 YU179	CUB	167	0.55	2003	146	–	–	2008	80	2000	18	BIN JPL LoMP
2004 HD79	CUB	319	0.85	2004	243	8+	–	2019	206	2780	12	BIN JPL
2004 HK79	CUB	183	1.0	2004	129	–	–	2019	129	3600	41	BIN JPL
2004 KB19	PLU	146	0.95	2004	105	–	–	2012	100	3400	53	BIN JPL uTNO
2004 KE19	CUB	221	0.67	2004	184	–	–	2019	123	4110	36	BIN JPL
2004 KH19	CUB	221	0.721	2004	179	–	–	2011	129	13000	210	BIN JPL uTNO
2004 MU8	CUB	175	0.89	2004	131	2.5+	–	2019	116	5840	89	BIN JPL
2004 PB108	CUB	277	0.544	2004	243	–	–	2006	132	10400	97.02	BIN JPL uTNO
2004 PV117	CUB	221	0.44	2004	203	–	–	2019	89	6800	73	BIN JPL
2004 PW117	CUB	242	0.72	2004	196	–	–	2019	141	23190	430	BIN JPL
2004 PX117	CUB	221	0.81	2004	172	–	–	2019	139	5940	64	BIN JPL
2005 GD187	CUB	160	0.832	2005	123	–	–	2009	102	7600	150	BIN JPL uTNO
2005 VZ122	CUB	133	0.398	2005	124	–	–	2008	49	2300	30	BIN JPL uTNO
2006 BR284	CUB	114	0.794	2006	89.8	–	–	2006	71	25300	1501	BIN JPL uTNO
2006 CH69	CUB	129	0.817	2006	100	–	–	2004	82	27000	1420	BIN JPL uTNO
2006 JV58	CUB	211	0.76	2006	168	–	–	2019	127	4340	43	BIN JPL
2006 SF369	1:3	201	0.977	2006	144	–	–	2007	141	3120	28	BIN JPL uTNO
(671468) 2014 LQ28	CUB	320	0.83	2014	250	–	–	2016	210	24000	290	BIN JPL LoMP
2014 OS393												
2015 QL14	CUB	180	0.9	2015	130	–	–	2017	120	52000	2300	BIN JPL uTNO
2015 RB280	CUB	134	0.76	2015	107	–	–	2019	81	6700	160	BIN JPL
2015 RP280	CUB	154	0.76	2015	123	–	–	2019	93	5080	86	BIN JPL
2015 RT245	CUB	222	0.95	2015	161	–	–	2019	153	14680	250	BIN JPL
2015 VM173	CUB	265	0.87	2015	200	–	–	2019	174	5290	41	BIN JPL
2015 VW168	CUB	106	0.76	2015	84	–	–	2019	64	5960	190	BIN JPL

back to summary

== See also ==
- Lists of astronomical objects
- Subsatellite, also known as a moonmoon – Satellite that orbits a natural satellite
- Yarkovsky–O'Keefe–Radzievskii–Paddack effect, also known as YORP effect – Asteroid rotation perturbation
- Satellite system (astronomy)
