= 2577 Litva =

Hungarian-type Mars-crosser and rare triple asteroid

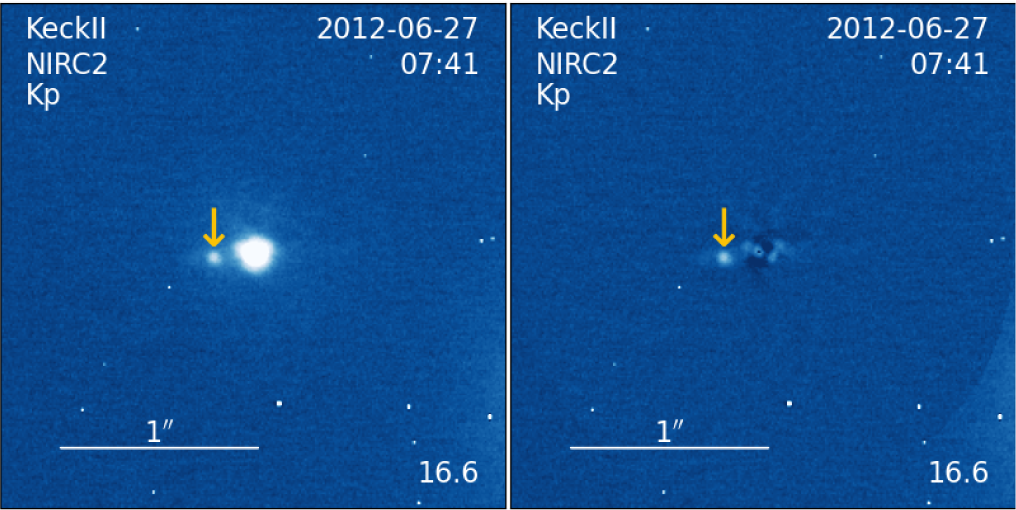
- Litva and its outer moon imaged by the Keck II Telescope in June 2012

Discovery
- Discovered by: N. Chernykh
- Discovery site: Crimean Astrophysical Obs.
- Discovery date: 12 March 1975

Designations
- Pronunciation: Russian: [lʲɪtˈva]
- Named after: Литва́ (Lithuania)
- Alternative designations: 1975 EE_{3} · 1934 VY; 1954 JD · 1976 SA_{2}
- Minor planet category: Mars-crosser · Hungaria

Orbital characteristics
- Epoch 4 September 2017 (JD 2458000.5)
- Uncertainty parameter 0
- Observation arc: 82.59 yr (30,166 days)
- Aphelion: 2.1670 AU
- Perihelion: 1.6420 AU
- Semi-major axis: 1.9045 AU
- Eccentricity: 0.1379
- Orbital period (sidereal): 2.63 yr (960 days)
- Mean anomaly: 116.54°
- Mean motion: 0° 22^{m} 30^{s} / day
- Inclination: 22.908°
- Longitude of ascending node: 182.60°
- Argument of perihelion: 284.04°
- Known satellites: 2 (Note: Central Bureau for Astronomical Telegrams (No. 3402), 11 March 2009 for (2577) LITVA: "Photometric observations obtained during Feb. 28 – Mar. 8 reveal that minor planet (2577) is a binary system with an orbital period of 35.78 +/- 0.05 hr. The primary shows a period of 2.8141 +/- 0.0006 hr, and it has a lightcurve amplitude of 0.24 mag. Mutual eclipse/occultation events indicate a secondary-to-primary mean-diameter ratio of 0.35 +/- 0.02. The periods and amplitudes were determined using a subset of data (Mar. 4-8). Data on Feb. 28 and Mar. 1 show no events and fit the same primary period, but the lightcurve has a slightly different shape; this may indicate that the primary lightcurve is evolving with changing viewing aspect, and so additional observations are warranted as the moon clears the area." — Reported by B. D. Warner, Palmer Divide Observatory and Space Science Institute, Colorado Springs, CO, U.S.A.; P. Pravec, Ondrejov Observatory; A. W. Harris, Space Science Institute, La Canada, CA, U.S.A.; D. Higgins, Hunters Hill Observatory, Ngunnawal, ACT, Australia; C. Bembrick, Mt. Tarana Observatory, Bathurst, NSW, Australia; and J. Brinsfield, Via Capote Observatory, Thousand Oaks, CA, U.S.A.) (Note: Central Bureau for Astronomical Telegrams (No. 3765), 22 December 2013 for S/2012 (2577) 1: Reports the discovery, using the Keck II telescope (+ NIRC2 Laser-Guide-Star adaptive-optics system), of a second satellite of the Hungaria-type minor planet (2577) Litva. On 2012 June 22.3 UT, the satellite was found at p.a. 89 deg and separation 0".229 (projected separation 230 km). At that time, (2577) was 1.39 AU from the earth at magnitude V = 16.6. The satellite has been imaged in the K_p, H, and J bands. It was also detected on 2012 June 27, Aug. 11, and Aug. 16. Failure to detect it on 2012 July 15, despite excellent conditions, is now seen, in retrospect, to be due to being in conjunction with the primary. Follow-up observations were made at the Keck II telescope (+ LGS-AO) on 2013 Aug. 25 and 26 by Merline, Tamblyn, Conrad, and Tamblyn. Additional detections were made at the Large Binocular Telescope (adaptive secondary mirror and PISCES near-infrared camera at the "Right Front Bent" Gregorian focus) by Veillet and Arcidiacono on 2013 Oct. 12 and at the Keck II telescope (+ LGS-AO) by Grundy and Porter on 2013 Oct. 25, giving a total baseline of 490 days. The best-fit orbit analysis indicates that the third component has a semi-major axis of 378 km and an orbital period of 214 days. Despite the long baseline and the number of observational epochs, the phasing of the observations is such that a period of half this length cannot be ruled out. Either orbit would be among the longest periods known for main-belt binary/multiple systems and would also be the most loosely bound. It resembles other wide binary systems discovered by this same group (see: The Formation of the Wide Asynchronous Binary Asteroid Population). The third component is about 2.6 mag fainter than the combined brightness of the close inner pair. Using H magnitudes to scale the size of (2577) from other E-type objects of better-known size, the diameter of (2577) is estimated to be about 4 km, implying a size for the new satellite of 1.2 km. The first satellite of (2577) was discovered by Warner et al. (CBET 1715) in 2009, by lightcurve analysis, revealing eclipses/occultations by a close secondary, having an orbital period of 35.9 hr; their estimate of the size ratio was 0.35, meaning that the second component would be 1.4 km diameter, based on the 4-km assumption for (2577), above. This close inner pair is unresolvable in the imaging data reported above. Warner et al. (2009, Minor Planet Bull. 36, 165) suggested that a residual 5.7-hr lightcurve period may be due to rotation by a third body, an idea further bolstered by Pravec et al. (2012, Icarus 218, 125), who found that this period was still evident even when the secondary object was in eclipse. The observing program described here has given high priority to objects suspected of having satellites. To the authors' knowledge, S/2012 (2577) 1 is the only satellite to have been predicted prior to being found by targeted imaging." — Reported by W. J. Merline, Southwest Research Institute (SwRI); P. M. Tamblyn, Binary Astronomy, LLC, Dillon, CO, U.S.A., and SwRI; B. D. Warner, Center for Solar System Studies, Landers, CA, USA; P. Pravec, Ondrejov Observatory; J. P. Tamblyn, Binary Astronomy, LLC, Dillon, CO, U.S.A.; C. Neyman, W. M. Keck Observatory; A. R. Conrad, Max Planck Institute for Astronomy; W. M. Owen, Jet Propulsion Laboratory; B. Carry, Institut de Mecanique Celeste et de Calcul des Ephemerides, Paris Observatory; J. D. Drummond, Starfire Optical Range, Air Force Research Laboratory, Kirtland Air Force Base, Albuquerque, NM, U.S.A.; C. R. Chapman and B. L. Enke, SwRI; W. M. Grundy, Lowell Observatory; C. Veillet, Large Binocular Telescope Observatory (LBTO); S. B. Porter, Lowell Observatory; C. Arcidiacono, Astronomical Observatory of Bologna, Istituto Nazionale di Astrofisica; J. C. Christou, LBTO; D. D. Durda, SwRI; A. W. Harris, "More Data!", La Canada, CA, USA; H. A. Weaver, Applied Physics Laboratory, Johns Hopkins University; C. Dumas, European Southern Observatory, Chile; D. Terrell, Sonoita Research Observatory and SwRI; and P. Maley, Houston, TX, USA)

Physical characteristics
- Dimensions: 5.51 km (derived)
- Synodic rotation period: 2.81±0.06 h 2.81258±0.00002 h 2.81288±0.00005 h 2.8141±0.0006 h 2.82±0.01 h 5.618±0.006 h (dated)
- Geometric albedo: 0.172±0.077; 0.30 (assumed)
- Spectral type: Tholen = EU · Sl · Q · EU; B–V = 0.787; U–B = 0.340
- Absolute magnitude (H): 12.77±0.11 · 12.81±0.43 · 13.18 · 13.48±0.09

2577 Litva (provisional designation 1975 EE_{3}) is a Hungarian-type Mars-crosser and rare triple asteroid from the inner regions of the asteroid belt, approximately 5.5 kilometers in diameter.

== History ==
Litva was discovered on 12 March 1975 by Soviet–Ukrainian astronomer Nikolai Chernykh at the Crimean Astrophysical Observatory in Nauchnyj, on the Crimean peninsula. It was named for the former Lithuanian Soviet Socialist Republic, which is now the nation of Lithuania.

Litva was named after the Russian name for the Baltic state Lithuania, former member of the Soviet Union and now an independent Republic. The official naming citation was published by the Minor Planet Center on 1 December 1982 (M.P.C. 7472).

== Orbit and classification ==
Litva is a member of the Hungaria family, which form the innermost dense concentration of asteroids in the Solar System. It orbits the Sun at a distance of 1.6–2.2 AU once every 2 years and 8 months (960 days). Its orbit has an eccentricity of 0.14 and an inclination of 23° with respect to the ecliptic.

== Physical characteristics ==
In the Tholen taxonomy, Litva is classified as an EU-type, a subtype of the bright E-type asteroids. It has also been characterized as a Sl-type and Q-type asteroid by astronomers using the New Technology Telescope at La Silla and by PanSTARRS' photometric survey, respectively.

=== Rotation period ===
The body has a rotation period between 2.81288 and 2.82 hours, superseding the original measurement that gave 5.618 hours. Most recent photometric observation from 2014, gave a refined period of 2.812186 hours, using a statistical Bayesian inference methodology.

== Satellite system ==
In March 2009 the Central Bureau for Astronomical Telegrams announced the discovery of a moon orbiting the asteroid. The satellite measures about 1.4 kilometers in diameter and orbits Litva at distance of 21 kilometers, with an orbital period of 1 day, 11 hours, and 53 minutes. In 2012, a second satellite orbiting at a distance of 378 kilometers, with a diameter of 1.2 kilometers, was discovered, with an orbital period of 214 days. The discovery was announced in late 2013. This made Litva the 11th asteroid discovered to be in a triple system.

Satellite	Semi-major axis	Orbital period	Size	Discovered
inner	21 km	36 hours	1.4 km	2009
S/2012 (2577) 1	378 km	214 days	1.2 km	2012
