= (6265) 1985 TW3 =

Main-belt asteroid binary

(6265) 1985 TW_{3}
Discovery
- Discovered by: T. F. Fric; R. J. Gilbrech
- Discovery site: Palomar Obs.
- Discovery date: 11 October 1985

Designations
- Alternative designations: 1953 RK_{1} · 1969 TZ_{4} · 1979 YG_{9} · 1985 VQ_{1} · 1987 GD_{1} · 1990 CX
- Minor planet category: main-belt · (inner) background

Orbital characteristics
- Epoch 27 April 2019 (JD 2458600.5)
- Uncertainty parameter 0
- Observation arc: 48.42 yr (17,685 d)
- Aphelion: 2.5839 AU
- Perihelion: 1.7476 AU
- Semi-major axis: 2.1658 AU
- Eccentricity: 0.1931
- Orbital period (sidereal): 3.19 yr (1,164 d)
- Mean anomaly: 228.64°
- Mean motion: 0° 18^{m} 33.12^{s} / day
- Inclination: 4.1152°
- Longitude of ascending node: 45.173°
- Argument of perihelion: 281.59°
- Known satellites: 1 (D: 1.16 km; P: 15.9 h)

Physical characteristics
- Mean diameter: 4.954±0.100 km 5.20±0.22 km
- Synodic rotation period: 2.70932±0.00008 h
- Geometric albedo: 0.285; 0.286; 0.2865
- Spectral type: L (SDSS-MOC)
- Absolute magnitude (H): 13.40; 13.50; 13.6

(6265) 1985 TW_{3} is a background asteroid and binary system from the inner regions of the asteroid belt. It was discovered on 11 October 1985, by astronomer by T. F. Fric and Richard Gilbrech at the Palomar Observatory in California. It is the only minor-planet discovery for these two astronomers. The stony L-type asteroid measures approximately 5 kilometers (3.1 miles) in diameter and has a rotation period of 2.7 hours. Its 1.2-kilometer sized minor-planet moon was discovered in July 2007 and announced the following month.

== Orbit and classification ==
1985 TW_{3} is a non-family asteroid from the main belt's background population when applying the hierarchical clustering method to its proper orbital elements. Based on osculating Keplerian orbital elements, the asteroid has also been classified as a member of the Flora family (402), a giant asteroid family and the largest family of stony asteroids in the main-belt.

It orbits the Sun in the inner asteroid belt at a distance of 1.7–2.6 AU once every 3 years and 2 months (1,164 days; semi-major axis of 2.17 AU). Its orbit has an eccentricity of 0.19 and an inclination of 4° with respect to the ecliptic. It was first observed as 1953 RK_{1} at the former Alma-Ata Observatory (210) in September 1953. The body's observation arc begins with its observation as 1979 YG_{9} at Crimea–Nauchnij in December 1979, or almost 6 years prior to its official discovery observation at Palomar Observatory.

== Numbering and naming ==
This minor planet was permanently numbered (6265) by the Minor Planet Center on 17 March 1995 (M.P.C. 24890–24891). As of 2018, it has not been named.

== Physical characteristics ==
In the SDSS-based taxonomy, 1985 TW_{3} is an unusual L-type asteroid.

=== Rotation period ===
In June 2010, a rotational lightcurve of 1985 TW_{3} was obtained from photometric observations by Australian astronomers David Higgins and Julian Oey at the Hunters Hill (E14) and Leura Observatory (E17). Lightcurve analysis gave a well-defined rotation period of 2.70932±0.00008 hours with a brightness variation of 0.35 magnitude (U=3). Several concurring period determinations in the range of 2.7091 to 2.710 hours with an amplitude of 0.26 to 0.36 magnitude were also made between 2007 and 2013 (U=3/3/3/3-/2).

=== Satellite ===
During a previous photometric observation by David Higgins on 15 July 2007, it was revealed that 1985 TW_{3} is a binary asteroid with a minor-planet moon in its orbit. The discovery was announced on 2 August 2007. The satellite measures approximately 1.16 kilometers. It is separated by 8 km from its primary, orbiting it once every 15 hours and 52 minutes (15.859 hours or 0.6608 days).

=== Diameter and albedo ===
According to the survey carried out by the NEOWISE mission of NASA's Wide-field Infrared Survey Explorer (WISE), 1985 TW_{3} measures between 4.95 and 5.20 kilometers in diameter and its surface has an albedo between 0.285 and 0.287. The Johnston's archive derives a diameter of 4.81 km and 1.16 km for the primary and secondary, respectively, based on an effective WISE-diameter of 4.95 km and using the lower limit of 0.24 for the secondary-to-primary diameter-ratio (D_{s/p}) determined by David Higgins. Later observation by Higgins and Pravec determined a D_{s/p} ratio of 0.30 to 0.32, which increases the satellites size by a quarter to a third if all other factors remain unchanged. The Collaborative Asteroid Lightcurve Link assumes a standard albedo for members of the Flora family of 0.24 and calculates a diameter of 5.17 kilometers based on an absolute magnitude of 13.6.
