= 4674 Pauling =

Binary Hungaria asteroid

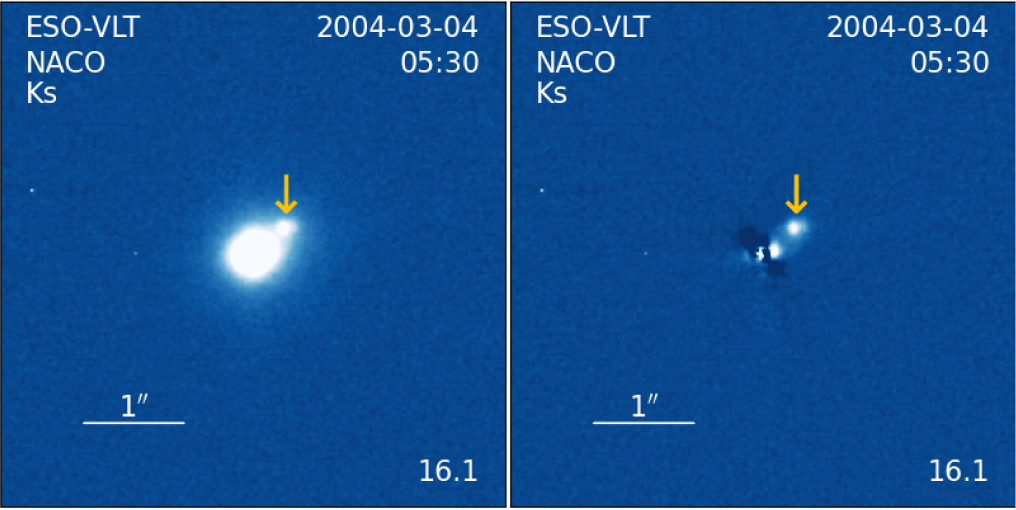
- Pauling and its moon imaged by the Very Large Telescope in March 2004

Discovery
- Discovered by: E. F. Helin
- Discovery site: Palomar Obs.
- Discovery date: 2 May 1989

Designations
- Pronunciation: /ˈpɔːlɪŋ/
- Named after: Linus Pauling (American Nobel laureate)
- Alternative designations: 1989 JC
- Minor planet category: main-belt · Hungaria

Orbital characteristics
- Epoch 4 September 2017 (JD 2458000.5)
- Uncertainty parameter 0
- Observation arc: 31.47 yr (11,493 days)
- Aphelion: 1.9896 AU
- Perihelion: 1.7277 AU
- Semi-major axis: 1.8586 AU
- Eccentricity: 0.0705
- Orbital period (sidereal): 2.53 yr (926 days)
- Mean anomaly: 156.57°
- Mean motion: 0° 23^{m} 20.4^{s} / day
- Inclination: 19.444°
- Longitude of ascending node: 232.94°
- Argument of perihelion: 239.71°
- Known satellites: 1 (Note: Central Bureau for Astronomical Telegrams, IAUC 8297, March 2004, reports: The discovery of a satellite of minor planet (4674) Pauling from J-, H-, and K_s-band imaging with the ESO 8-m Very Large Telescope UT4/YEPUN (+NAOS/CONICA adaptive-optics system) on Cerro Paranal. On Mar. 4.2278, the companion was at separation 0".39 (projected separation 250 km) in p.a. 308 deg. The K_s brightness difference is about 2.5 mag, giving an estimated diameter of the satellite of about 2.5 km (assumed diameter of the primary being 8 km). Reported by: W. J. Merline, Southwest Research Institute (SwRI); P. M. Tamblyn, Binary Astronomy and SwRI; C. Dumas, European Southern Observatory (ESO); F. Menard, Observatoire de Grenoble; L. M. Close, University of Arizona; C. R. Chapman, SwRI; G. Duvert, Observatoire de Grenoble; and N. Ageorges, ESO IAUC 8297: S/2004 (4674) 1)

Physical characteristics
- Dimensions: 4.19±0.12 km 4.52 km 4.684±0.046 km 4.7±0.5 km 4.818±0.043
- Synodic rotation period: 2.53057±0.00009 h (Note: Pravec (2005) web: rotation period 2.53057±0.00009 hours with a brightness amplitude of 0.06 mag and no Quality Code assigned by the LCDB. Summary figures at Collaborative Asteroid Lightcurve Link (CALL) for (4674) Pauling); 2.5306±0.0003 h 2.5307±0.0003 h 2.5312±0.0001 h 2.532±0.002 h (Note: Warner (2016): rotation period 2.53057±0.00009 hours with a brightness amplitude of 0.06 mag with a Quality Code of U=3. Summary figures for (4674) Pauling at Collaborative Asteroid Lightcurve Link (CALL)); 2.533±0.003 h
- Geometric albedo: 0.1733; 0.332±0.046; 0.387±0.090; 0.3872±0.0810
- Spectral type: E
- Absolute magnitude (H): 13.3 · 13.8 · 14.0 · 14.245 · 14.43±0.38

4674 Pauling, provisional designation 1989 JC, is a binary Hungaria asteroid from the innermost regions of the asteroid belt, approximately 4.5 kilometers in diameter. It was discovered by American astronomer Eleanor Helin at the U.S. Palomar Observatory, California, on 2 May 1989, and named after the American chemist and Nobel laureate Linus Pauling.

== Orbit and classification ==
The bright E-type asteroid is a member of the Hungaria family, which form the innermost dense concentration of asteroids in the Solar System. It orbits the Sun in the inner main-belt at a distance of 1.7–2.0 AU once every 2 years and 6 months (926 days). Its orbit has an eccentricity of 0.07 and an inclination of 19° with respect to the ecliptic. The first precovery was taken at Palomar Observatory in 1985, extending the asteroid's observation arc by 4 years prior to its discovery.

== Diameter and albedo ==
According to the surveys carried out by NASA's space-based Spitzer and WISE telescopes, the asteroid measures between 4.2 and 4.8 kilometers in diameter and has a surface albedo of 0.17 to 0.39.

== Lightcurve ==
Several rotational lightcurves for this asteroids were obtained from photometric observations between 2005 and 2015, most notably by Italian astronomer Silvano Casulli and American astronomer Brian Warner at the U.S. Palmer Divide Observatory, Colorado. The lightcurves gave a rotation period of 2.531–2.533 hours (U=3) with an exceptionally low brightness amplitude of less than 0.01 in magnitude, indicating that the body has a nearly spheroidal shape.

== Moon ==
In 2004, a team of astronomers at ESO's Very Large Telescope, Chile, announced that Pauling is orbited by a small asteroid moon. The moon has received a provisional designation for natural satellites: S/2004 (4674) 1. It was believed to measure 2.5 kilometers in diameter (now rather 1.5 km, since the primary's size estimate has been reduced from 8 to 4.5 kilometers) and to orbit Pauling at a distance of 250 kilometers once every 1200 hours.

== Naming ==
This minor planet is named in honor of the American chemist, biochemist, peace activist, author, educator, and multiple Nobel laureate Linus Pauling (1901–1994). The naming took place on the occasion of his 90th birthday. Pauling had a renowned and several decade long career at Caltech, and was leading its Department of Chemistry and Chemical Engineering. In 1954 and 1962, he received the Nobel Prize in Chemistry and the Nobel Peace Prize, respectively. Astronomer Eleanor Helin was one of his admirers. The approved naming citation was published by the Minor Planet Center on 30 March 1991 (M.P.C. 17981).
