= 17246 Christophedumas =

Asteroid binary

- Christophedumas and its satellite imaged by the Hubble Space Telescope from May to July 2005

Discovery
- Discovered by: LINEAR
- Discovery site: Lincoln Lab ETS
- Discovery date: 5 April 2000

Designations
- Pronunciation: /kriːstɔːf djuːˈmɑː/
- Named after: Christophe Dumas (planetary scientist)
- Alternative designations: 2000 GL_{74} · 1973 VM
- Minor planet category: main-belt · Koronis

Orbital characteristics
- Epoch 4 September 2017 (JD 2458000.5)
- Uncertainty parameter 0
- Observation arc: 45.84 yr (16,742 days)
- Aphelion: 2.9023 AU
- Perihelion: 2.7772 AU
- Semi-major axis: 2.8398 AU
- Eccentricity: 0.0220
- Orbital period (sidereal): 4.79 yr (1,748 days)
- Mean anomaly: 180.58°
- Mean motion: 0° 12^{m} 21.6^{s} / day
- Inclination: 2.4444°
- Longitude of ascending node: 34.451°
- Argument of perihelion: 229.77°
- Known satellites: 1 (Note: IAUC 8293, S/2004 (17246) 1: reports the discovery on Jan. 14.9 UT, on six direct images (two sets of three images taken 20 min apart in time) made with the Hubble Space Telescope (+ ACS/HRC), of a satellite of minor planet (17246) 2000 GL_74 (V about 18.5). The satellite is clearly separated from the primary in five images. On Jan. 14.9195, the satellite was at separation 0".16 (projected separation 230 km) in p.a. 280 deg. Using the average albedo of the Koronis family (about 0.21), to which (17246) belongs, the size of the primary is estimated to be 4.5 km. The brightness difference is about 2 mag, giving an estimated diameter of the secondary of about 2 km. Reported by: P. M. Tamblyn, Southwest Research Institute (SwRI) and Binary Astronomy; W. J. Merline, C. R. Chapman, D. Nesvorny, and D. D. Durda, SwRI; C. Dumas, Jet Propulsion Laboratory; A. D. Storrs, Towson University; L. M. Close, University of Arizona; and F. Menard, Observatoire de Grenoble)

Physical characteristics
- Dimensions: 4.5 km 4.81 km (calculated)
- Synodic rotation period: 10 h
- Geometric albedo: 0.21
- Spectral type: S
- Absolute magnitude (H): 13.9

17246 Christophedumas (provisional designation 2000 GL_{74}) is a stony Koronian asteroid and binary system from the outer regions of the asteroid belt, approximately 4.6 kilometers in diameter.

It was discovered on 5 April 2000, by the LINEAR program at Lincoln Laboratory's Experimental Test Site near Socorro, New Mexico, United States. It was named after planetary scientist Christophe Dumas. The asteroid's minor-planet moon was discovered in 2004.

== Orbit and classification ==
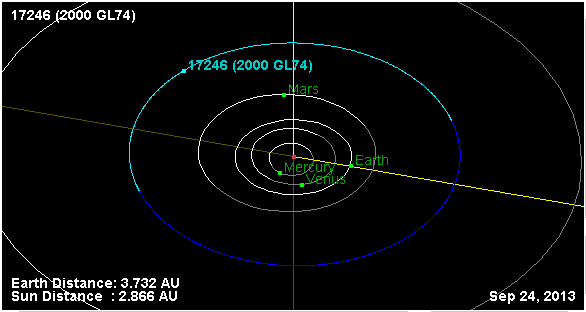
Orbit of Christophedumas

Christophedumas is a member of the Koronis family, which is named after 158 Koronis. It orbits the Sun in the outer main-belt at a distance of 2.8–2.9 AU once every 4 years and 9 months (1,748 days). Its orbit has an eccentricity of 0.02 and an inclination of 2° with respect to the ecliptic. The asteroid's observation arc begins 29 years prior to its official discovery observation, with a precovery taken at Palomar Observatory in April 1971.

=== Close approach with Juno ===
On 9 January 2129, Christophedumas will come within 3,639,998 kilometers of 3 Juno, one of the largest asteroids in the main-belt, and will pass it with a relative velocity of 6.597 km/s.

== Physical characteristics ==
Christophedumas is a presumed stony S-type asteroid. With an albedo of 0.21, it is more reflective than most asteroids in the outer main-belt. The Collaborative Asteroid Lightcurve Link adopts an albedo of 0.21 and calculates a diameter of 4.81 kilometers based on an absolute magnitude of 13.9.

In December 2007, a rotational lightcurve of Christophedumas was obtained from photometric observations by Israeli astronomer David Polishook and colleagues. Lightcurve analysis gave a rotation period of 10 hours with a brightness amplitude of 0.15 magnitude (U=n.a.). The team of astronomers also ruled out that Christophedumas might be an Escaping Ejecta Binary (EEB), that are thought to be created by fragments ejected from a disruptive impact event.

== Moon ==
In 2004, a minor-planet moon, designated S/2004 (17246) 1, was discovered orbiting its primary, making Christophedumas a binary asteroid. With a secondary-to-primary mean-diameter ratio of 0.22, the moon measures approximately 1 kilometer in diameter, based on a diameter of 4.5 kilometers for its primary. While its rotation period and orbital eccentricity is not yet known, it is known that the moon completes one orbit every 90 days (2034 hours) with a semi-major axis of 228 kilometers.

From the surface of Christophedumas, the moon would have an apparent diameter of about 0.668°, slightly larger than the Moon appears from Earth. (Note: Calculated by solving $\tan\left(\frac{\theta}{2}\right) = \frac{\text{radius of moon}}{\text{distance from surface of asteroid to center of moon}}$.)

== Naming ==
This minor planet was named after planetary scientist Christophe Dumas (born 1968), an observer of Solar System objects and expert in using adaptive optics. Dumas is a co-discoverer of the first asteroid moon imaged from Earth. The approved naming citation was published by the Minor Planet Center on 20 June 2016 (M.P.C. 100606).
