= (363027) 1998 ST27 =

Near-Earth asteroid

(363027) 1998 ST_{27}
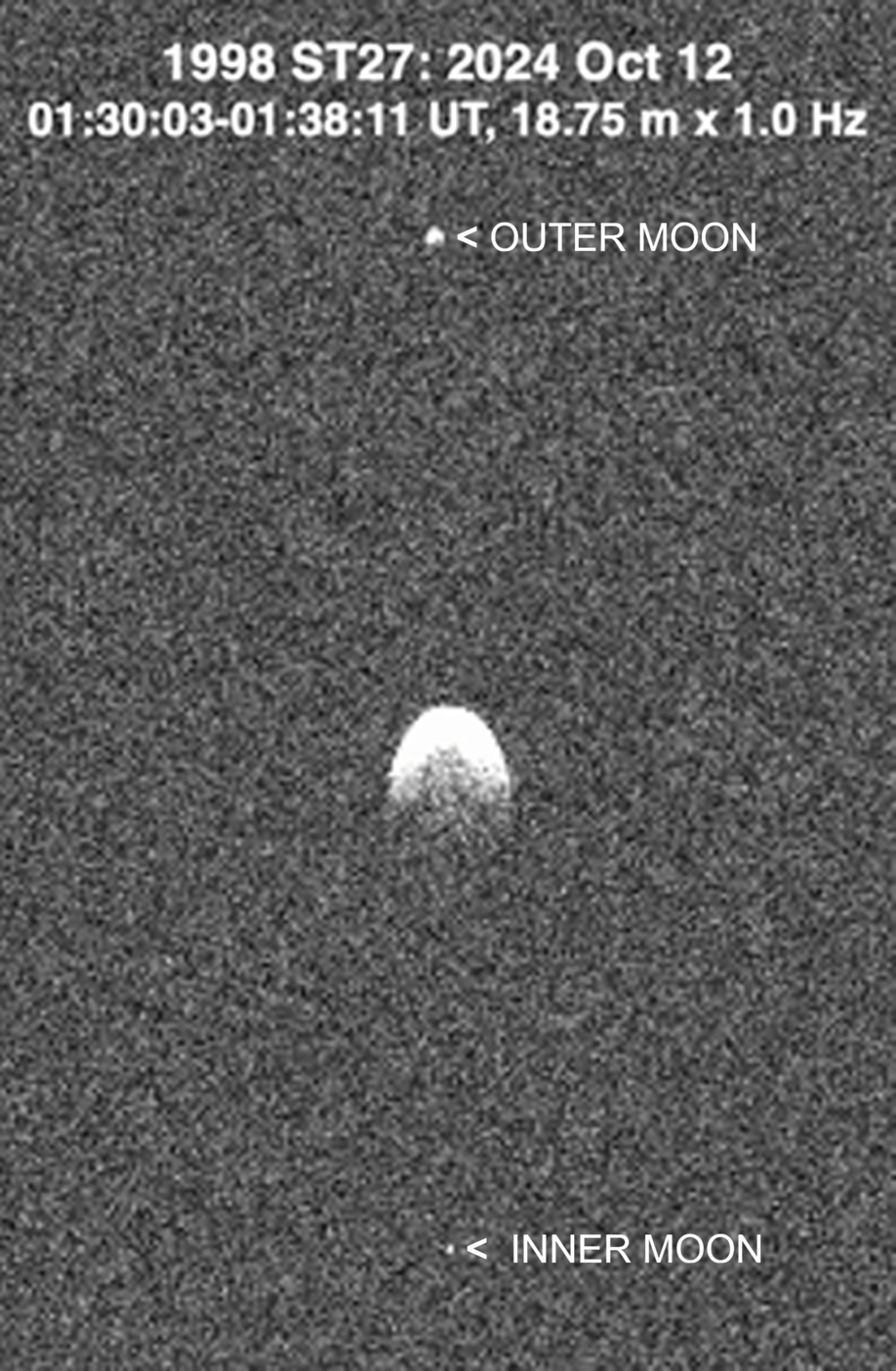
- Radar echo of 1998 ST_{27} and its two moons

Discovery
- Discovered by: LINEAR
- Discovery site: Lincoln Laboratory ETS
- Discovery date: 24 September 1998

Designations
- Minor planet category: NEO · Aten · PHA

Orbital characteristics
- Epoch 21 November 2025 (JD 2461000.5)
- Uncertainty parameter 0
- Aphelion: 1.2541 AU
- Perihelion: 0.38550 AU
- Semi-major axis: 0.81982 AU
- Eccentricity: 0.8188
- Orbital period (sidereal): 271.127 d (0.7423 yr)
- Mean anomaly: 88.4052°
- Mean motion: 1.3278° / d
- Inclination: 21.0507°
- Longitude of ascending node: 197.515°
- Argument of perihelion: 322.439°
- Known satellites: 2
- Earth MOID: 0.009813 AU
- T_{Jupiter}: 6.975

Physical characteristics
- Mean diameter: ~800–900 m
- Sidereal rotation period: ~2.7 h
- Geometric albedo: 0.059±0.066
- Spectral type: C?
- Absolute magnitude (H): 19.58

(363027) 1998 ST_{27} is a triple near-Earth asteroid (NEA) in the inner Solar System. It was discovered on 24 September 1998 by the LINEAR program at Lincoln Laboratory ETS in New Mexico, United States. It is about 800 to 900 metres (2,600 to 3,000 ft) in diameter and rotates once every 2.7 hours.

1998 ST_{27} has two unnamed moons. Its inner and outer moon were discovered by radar observation in 2024 and 2001, respectively. The very small inner moon is no larger than 50 metres (160 ft). The larger, 100-metre (330 ft) outer moon lies on a wide orbit, with an orbital period of at least seven days. Its rotation period is shorter, so it is not tidally locked.

== Orbit ==
1998 ST_{27} orbits the Sun at an average distance—its semi-major axis—of 0.82 astronomical units, taking 271.1 Earth days to complete one orbit. It has an orbital eccentricity of 0.82, causing its distance from the Sun to range from 0.39 AU at perihelion to 1.25 AU at aphelion. Since it is an Earth-crossing near-Earth asteroid with a semi-major axis of less than 1 AU, it is categorized as an Aten asteroid. Its orbit is inclined by 21° with respect to the ecliptic. It crosses the orbits of every terrestrial planet, and it frequently has close encounters with Mercury and Earth.

== Physical characteristics ==
Radar observations of 1998 ST_{27} show that it is about 800 to 900 metres (2,600 to 3,000 ft) in diameter. It is oblate in shape, with a relatively smooth surface. It has a low albedo of 0.059, and its surface color properties are consistent with a C-type classification.

Its rotation period is approximately 2.7 hours long, and it spins in a prograde direction.

== Moon system ==
1998 ST_{27} has two unnamed moons. Its outer moon may have formed in a fissioning event, with its orbit raised by other dynamics after formation, such as very close encounters with the planets. Upon the outer moon's discovery, the 1998 ST_{27} system was the first wide NEA binary known with an asynchronously rotating secondary.

=== Inner moon ===
The inner moon was discovered using Goldstone Observatory radar observations on 11 October 2024, as 1998 ST_{27} was undergoing a close encounter with Earth. It orbits 1998 ST_{27} "much more closely" than the outer moon, and it appears to be smaller than 50 metres (160 ft) in diameter.

=== Outer moon ===
The outer moon was discovered by a team of astronomers led by Lance A. M. Benner. They used Arecibo delay-Doppler radar observations taken on 7 and 9 October 2001. The satellite's discovery was announced in an International Astronomical Union Circular on 9 October. It is on an unusually wide orbit, with a separation of at least 5 kilometres (3.1 mi) and an orbital period greater than seven days. It is asynchronously rotating—that is, not tidally locked—spinning faster than its orbital period. It is about 100 metres (330 ft) in diameter.

== See also ==
Other triple NEAs:

- 3122 Florence
- (153591) 2001 SN263
- (136617) 1994 CC
