= 341520 Mors–Somnus =

Binary trans-Neptunian object

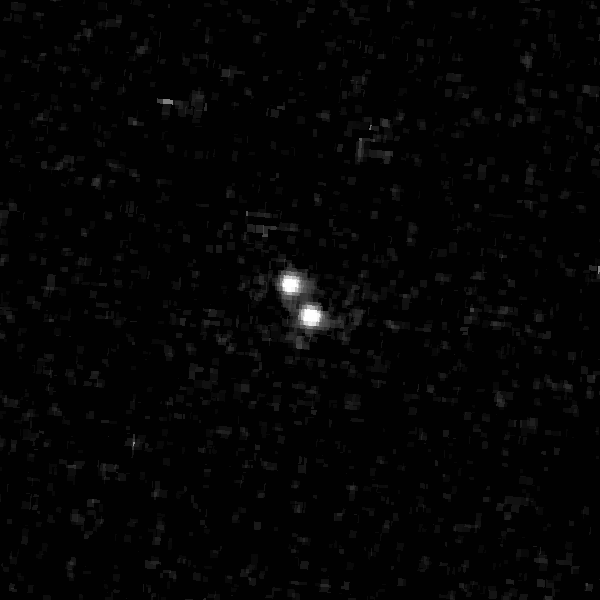
- Mors–Somnus photographed by the Hubble Space Telescope on 20 September 2008

Discovery
- Discovered by: S. S. Sheppard; C. Trujillo
- Discovery site: Mauna Kea Obs.
- Discovery date: 14 October 2007

Designations
- Pronunciation: /ˌmɔːrz ˈsɒmnəs/
- Named after: Mors and Somnus (Roman mythology)
- Alternative designations: 2007 TY_{430}
- Minor planet category: TNO · Plutino

Orbital characteristics
- Epoch 4 September 2017 (JD 2458000.5)
- Uncertainty parameter 3
- Observation arc: 6.12 yr (2,235 days)
- Aphelion: 49.184 AU
- Perihelion: 28.839 AU
- Semi-major axis: 39.012 AU
- Eccentricity: 0.2607
- Orbital period (sidereal): 243.67 yr (89,000 days)
- Mean anomaly: 0.4680°
- Mean motion: 0° 0^{m} 14.4^{s} / day
- Inclination: 11.304°
- Longitude of ascending node: 196.75°
- Argument of perihelion: 205.32°
- Known satellites: 1
- Uranus MOID: 9.15 AU (1.37 billion km)
- Neptune MOID: 0.62 AU (92.8 million km) (Note: A strong 3:2 resonance with Neptune prevents Mors–Somnus from getting this close.)

Physical characteristics
- Dimensions: 102 km (derived); 175.20 km (calculated) <60 km (each component)
- Mass: (7.90±0.21)×10^{17} kg
- Mean density: >0.5 g/cm^{3}
- Synodic rotation period: 9.28±0.05 h
- Geometric albedo: 0.10 (assumed); 0.23
- Temperature: <51.7 K (perihelion)
- Spectral type: CO_{2}-type ("double-dip"); B–V = 1.290±0.014; V–R = 0.740±0.010; V–I = 1.370±0.014; C
- Absolute magnitude (H): 6.9; 6.94±0.02

341520 Mors–Somnus (provisional designation 2007 TY_{430}) is a binary system of plutinos. It consists of two components less than 60 kilometers in diameter, orbiting at an average distance of 21000 km.

Mors–Somnus was discovered on 14 October 2007, by American astronomers Scott Sheppard and Chad Trujillo with the Subaru Telescope at Mauna Kea Observatories in Hawaii, United States. It was later named after the twins Mors and Somnus from Roman mythology.

== Orbit and binarity ==
Mors–Somnus is a small double plutino occupying the 3:2 mean motion resonance with Neptune. The object is a wide optically resolved binary with the following orbital parameters:

Orbital parameters of the Mors–Somnus system
Semi-major axis, km	Eccentricity	Period, d	Inclination, degree
21000 ± 160	0.1529 ± 0.0028	961.2 ± 4.6	15.68 ± 0.22

The components have almost equal size.

== Physical characteristics ==
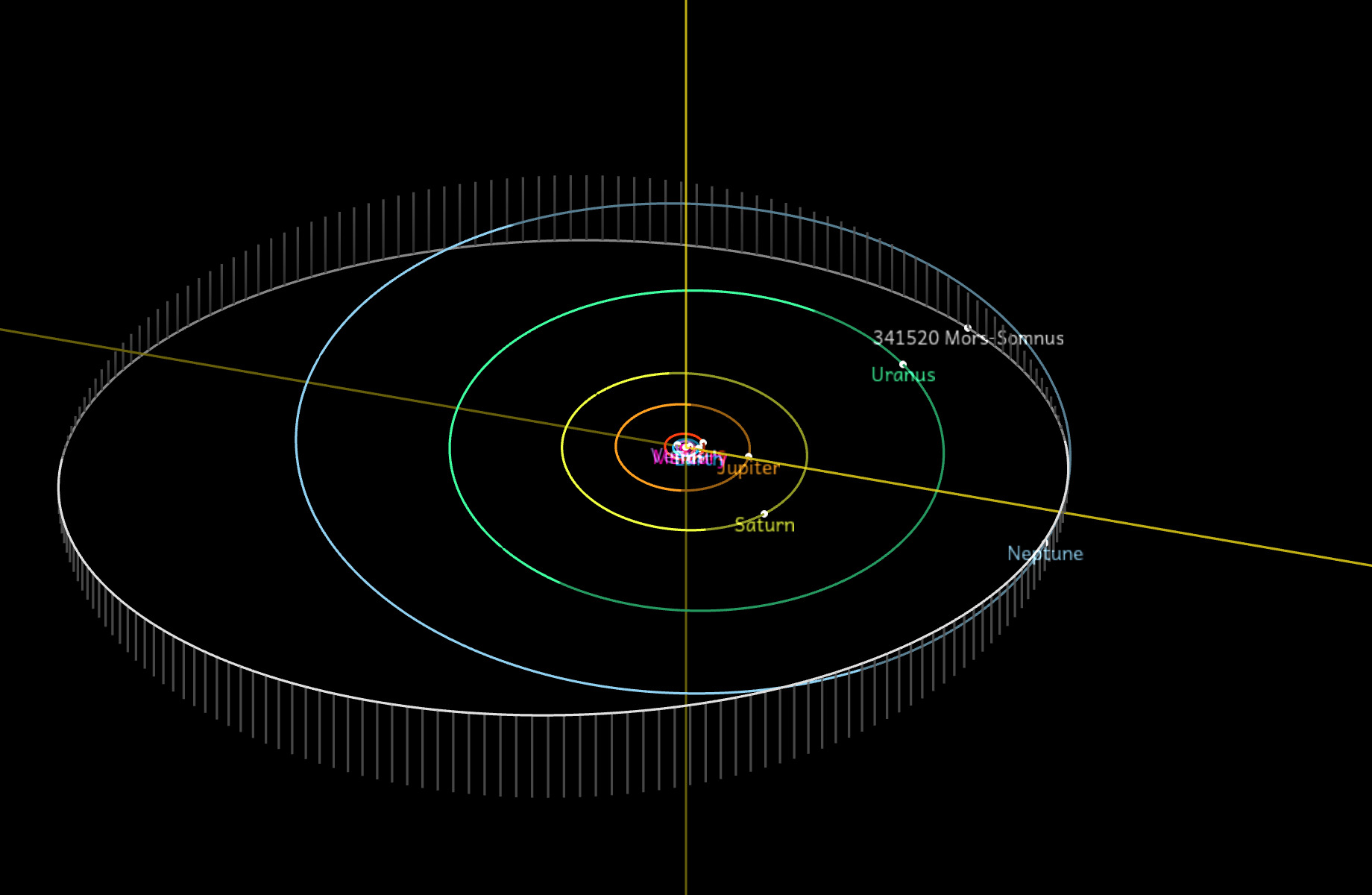
Diagram showing the heliocentric orbit of Mors–Somnus beyond the outer planets

The total mass of the system is 7.90 ± 0.21×10^{17} kg. For a realistic minimal density of 0.5 g/cm^{3} the albedo is >0.17 and the size of the components is <60 km. The Collaborative Asteroid Lightcurve Link assumes an albedo of 0.1 and calculates a diameter of 175.20 kilometers based on an absolute magnitude of 6.9.

Mors–Somnus has an ultra-red spectrum in the visible and near-infrared parts of the spectrum. The colors of two components are indistinguishable from each other. It demonstrates a double-peaked light curve with the period of about 9.28 hours and amplitude of 0.24. This indicates that either primary or secondary has an elongated shape and rotates non-synchronuosly.

== Evolution ==
The Mors–Somnus system is likely to be an escaped cold classical Kuiper belt object.

== Naming ==
The minor planet was named after the mythological twin Roman gods of death (Mors) and sleep (Somnus). The approved naming citation was published by the Minor Planet Center on 2 June 2015 (M.P.C. 94392).
