= 854 Frostia =

Main-belt asteroid

Discovery
- Discovered by: S. Beljavskij
- Discovery date: 3 April 1916

Designations
- Pronunciation: /ˈfrɒstiə/
- Alternative designations: SIGMA 29; 1931 MB; 1935 QE; 1950 VP
- Minor planet category: Main belt

Orbital characteristics
- Epoch 31 July 2016 (JD 2457600.5)
- Uncertainty parameter 0
- Observation arc: 73.52 yr (26853 d)
- Aphelion: 2.7805 AU (415.96 Gm)
- Perihelion: 1.9566 AU (292.70 Gm)
- Semi-major axis: 2.3685 AU (354.32 Gm)
- Eccentricity: 0.17393
- Orbital period (sidereal): 3.65 yr (1331.4 d)
- Mean anomaly: 128.5557°
- Mean motion: 0° 16^{m} 13.393^{s} / day
- Inclination: 6.0883°
- Longitude of ascending node: 190.6003°
- Argument of perihelion: 84.3355°

Physical characteristics
- Dimensions: 8.39 ± 1.27 km
- Mass: (1.06 ± 0.95) × 10^{15} kg
- Mean density: 0.88 ± 0.13 g/cm^{3}
- Synodic rotation period: 37.56 h (1.565 d)
- Geometric albedo: 0.33–0.6
- Absolute magnitude (H): 12.0

Satellite
Discovery
- Discovered by: R. Behrend; L. Bernasconi; A. Klotz; R. Durkee
- Discovery date: 17 July 2004
- Detection method: lightcurve

Orbital characteristics
- Semi-major axis: 17 km
- Orbital period (sidereal): 1.572 ± 0.00004 d 1 day, 13 hours, 43 minutes, 41 ± 3 seconds
- Angular distance: 25 mas (maximum)
- Satellite of: 854 Frostia

Physical characteristics
- Dimensions: 4.6 km
- Volume: 51 km^{3} (assumed)
- Apparent magnitude: 0.7 fainter than primary
- Absolute magnitude (H): ~14.8

854 Frostia is a main-belt asteroid orbiting the Sun. It was discovered in 1916 by Sergei Ivanovich Belyavsky from Simeiz Observatory in Crimea and is named after Edwin Brant Frost, an American astronomer. This asteroid measures approximately 8.4 km (5.2 mi) in diameter.

A satellite was identified based on light curve observations in July 2004 by Raoul Behrend, Laurent Bernasconi, Alain Klotz, and Russell I. Durkee. It is roughly 10 km (6.2 mi) in diameter and orbits about 25 km (16 mi) from Frostia with an orbital period of 1.572 days.
