= 1089 Tama =

Florian asteroid and synchronous binary system

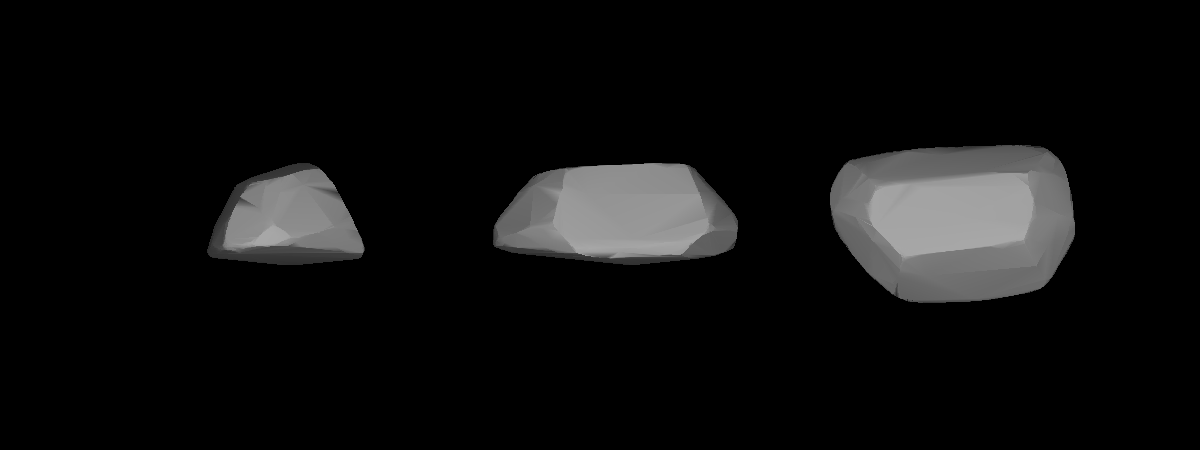
- Lightcurve-based 3D-model of Tama

Discovery
- Discovered by: O. Oikawa
- Discovery site: Tokyo Astronomical Obs.
- Discovery date: 17 November 1927

Designations
- Pronunciation: Japanese: [tama]
- Named after: Tama River (Japanese river)
- Alternative designations: 1927 WB · 1930 ST; 1952 HE_{4} · A894 VA; A904 VD · A919 HA
- Minor planet category: main-belt · (inner); Flora · background

Orbital characteristics
- Epoch 4 September 2017 (JD 2458000.5)
- Uncertainty parameter 0
- Observation arc: 122.40 yr (44,708 days)
- Aphelion: 2.4951 AU
- Perihelion: 1.9327 AU
- Semi-major axis: 2.2139 AU
- Eccentricity: 0.1270
- Orbital period (sidereal): 3.29 yr (1,203 days)
- Mean anomaly: 82.843°
- Mean motion: 0° 17^{m} 57.12^{s} / day
- Inclination: 3.7264°
- Longitude of ascending node: 71.489°
- Argument of perihelion: 354.29°
- Known satellites: 1

Physical characteristics
- Dimensions: 11.33±2.00 km 12.2±1.6 km 12.82 km (derived); 12.92±0.6 km 13.08±0.37 km 13.082±0.373 km 13.32±0.19 km
- Synodic rotation period: 4 (dated)h 16.4±0.1 h 16.44 h 16.444±0.001 h 16.4442±0.0004 h 16.445±0.005 h 16.45±0.05 h 16.4530±0.0004 h 16.464±0.004 h 16.4655 h
- Geometric albedo: 0.2048 (derived); 0.216±0.029; 0.2424±0.023; 0.243±0.008; 0.267±0.083; 0.32±0.23
- Spectral type: S (assumed)
- Absolute magnitude (H): 11.60 · 11.63±0.0 · 11.70 · 11.8 · 11.86±0.85

1089 Tama, provisional designation 1927 WB, is an elongated Florian asteroid and synchronous binary system from the inner regions of the asteroid belt, approximately 12 kilometers in diameter.

It was discovered by Japanese astronomer Okuro Oikawa at the old Tokyo Astronomical Observatory (389) on 17 November 1927. The asteroid was named after the Tama River in Japan. Its minor-planet moon was discovered in December 2003 and measures approximately 9 kilometers.

== Orbit and classification ==
Tama is a member of the Flora family (402), a giant asteroid family and the largest family of stony asteroids in the main-belt. It is, however, a non-family asteroid from the main belt's background population when applying the Hierarchical Clustering Method to its proper orbital elements.

The asteroid orbits the Sun in the inner main-belt at a distance of 1.9–2.5 AU once every 3 years and 3 months (1,203 days). Its orbit has an eccentricity of 0.13 and an inclination of 4° with respect to the ecliptic. Tama was first identified as A894 VA at Heidelberg Observatory in November 1894. The body's observation arc begins with its identification as A904 VD at Heidelberg in November 1904, or 23 years prior to its official discovery observation at Tokyo.

== Physical characteristics ==
Tama is an assumed stony S-type asteroid.

=== Rotation period ===
A large number of rotational lightcurves of Tama were obtained from photometric observations since it has been identified as a binary asteroid (see below). Lightcurve analysis gave a rotation period between 16.4 and 16.464 hours with a brightness variation between 0.08 and 0.41 magnitude (U=2-/2-3-/3), superseding a period of 4 hours from a fragmentary lightcurve obtained in the 1990s (U=1).

Tama appears to be somewhat elongated in shape. LCDB's consolidated result gives a period of 16.44 hours and an amplitude of 0.41 magnitude (U=3).

=== Diameter and albedo ===
According to the surveys carried out by the Infrared Astronomical Satellite IRAS, the Japanese Akari satellite, the Spitzer Space Telescope and the NEOWISE mission of the Wide-field Infrared Survey Explorer, Tama measures between 11.33 and 13.32 kilometers in diameter and its surface has an albedo between 0.216 and 0.32.

The Collaborative Asteroid Lightcurve Link derives an albedo of 0.2048 and a diameter of 12.82 kilometers based on an absolute magnitude of 11.8.

=== Satellite ===
In 2004, it was announced that Tama has a minor-planet moon. The satellite was identified based on lightcurve observations with mutual occultation and eclipsing events from 24 December 2003 to 5 January 2004 by Raoul Behrend, René Roy, Claudine Rinner, Pierre Antonini, Petr Pravec, Alan Harris, Stefano Sposetti, Russell Durkee, and Alain Klotz. The moon measures approximately 9 kilometers in diameter. It may orbits 20 km away in a period of 16.4442 hours (synchronously).

=== Spin axis ===
Tamas lightcurve has also been modeled. In 2013, modelling by an international study using photometric data from the US Naval Observatory, the Uppsala Asteroid Photometric Catalogue (UAPC) and the Palmer Divide Observatory, gave a concurring rotation period of 16.4655 hours. Another modeled lightcurve using data from UAPC, the Palomar Transient Factory survey, and individual observers, gave a period of 16.4461 hours as well as two spin axes of (193.0°, 32.0°) and (9.0°, 28.0°) in ecliptic coordinates (λ, β).

== Naming ==
This minor planet was named after Tama River near the discovering Tokyo Astronomical Observatory (389) in Japan. The official naming citation was mentioned in The Names of the Minor Planets by Paul Herget in 1955 (H 103).
