= List of Solar System objects by size =

Parts-per-million chart of the relative mass distribution of the Solar System. The whole cube represents all the mass in the Solar System. The cube is divided into 100 on each side, making 1 million cubelets. Each cubelet denoting 2×10^{24} kg.

This article includes a list of the most massive known objects of the Solar System and partial lists of smaller objects by observed mean radius. These lists can be sorted according to an object's radius and mass and, for the most massive objects, volume, density, and surface gravity, if these values are available.

These lists contain the Sun, the planets, dwarf planets, many of the larger small Solar System bodies (which includes the asteroids), all named natural satellites with measured sizes, and a number of smaller objects of historical or scientific interest, such as comets and near-Earth objects.

Many trans-Neptunian objects (TNOs) have been discovered; in many cases their positions in this list are approximate, as there is frequently a large uncertainty in their estimated diameters due to their distance from Earth. There are uncertainties in the figures for mass and radius, and irregularities in the shape and density, with accuracy often depending on how close the object is to Earth or whether it has been visited by a probe.

Solar System objects more massive than 10^{21} kilograms are known or expected to be approximately spherical. Astronomical bodies relax into rounded shapes (spheroids), achieving hydrostatic equilibrium, when their own gravity is sufficient to overcome the structural strength of their material. It was believed that the cutoff for round objects is somewhere between 100 km and 200 km in radius if they have a large amount of ice in their makeup; however, later studies revealed that icy satellites as large as Iapetus (1,470 kilometers in diameter) are not in hydrostatic equilibrium at this time, and a 2019 assessment suggests that many TNOs in the size range of 400–1,000 kilometers may not even be fully solid bodies, much less gravitationally rounded. Objects that are ellipsoids due to their own gravity are here generally referred to as being "round", whether or not they are actually in equilibrium today, while objects that are clearly not ellipsoidal are referred to as being "irregular".

Spheroidal bodies typically have some polar flattening due to the centrifugal force from their rotation, and can sometimes even have quite different equatorial diameters (scalene ellipsoids such as Haumea). Unlike bodies such as Haumea, the irregular bodies have a significantly non-ellipsoidal profile, often with sharp edges.

There can be difficulty in determining the diameter (within a factor of about 2) for typical objects beyond Saturn. For TNOs there is some confidence in the diameters, but for non-binary TNOs there is no real confidence in the masses/densities. Many TNOs are often just assumed to have Pluto's density of 2.0 g/cm^{3}, but it is just as likely that they have a comet-like density of only 0.5 g/cm^{3}.

For example, if a TNO is incorrectly assumed to have a mass of 3.59×10^{20} kg based on a radius of 350 km with a density of 2 g/cm^{3} but is later discovered to have a radius of only 175 km with a density of 0.5 g/cm^{3}, its true mass would be only 1.12×10^{19} kg.

The sizes and masses of many of the moons of Jupiter and Saturn are fairly well known due to numerous observations and interactions of the Galileo and Cassini orbiters; however, many of the moons with a radius less than ≈100 km, such as Jupiter's Himalia, have far more uncertain masses. Further out from Saturn, the sizes and masses of objects are less clear. There has not yet been an orbiter around Uranus or Neptune for long-term study of their moons. For the small outer irregular moons of Uranus, such as Sycorax, which were not discovered by the Voyager 2 flyby, even different NASA web pages, such as the National Space Science Data Center and JPL Solar System Dynamics, give somewhat contradictory size and albedo estimates depending on which research paper is being cited.

== Graphical overview ==
Relative diameters of the fifty largest measured bodies in the Solar System, colored by orbital region. Values are diameters in kilometers. Both scales are linear.

Relative masses of the bodies of the Solar System. Objects smaller than Saturn are not visible at this scale.

Relative masses of the Solar planets. Jupiter at 71% of the total and Saturn at 21% dominate the system.

Relative masses of the solid bodies of the Solar System. Earth at 48% and Venus at 39% dominate. Bodies less massive than Pluto are not visible at this scale.

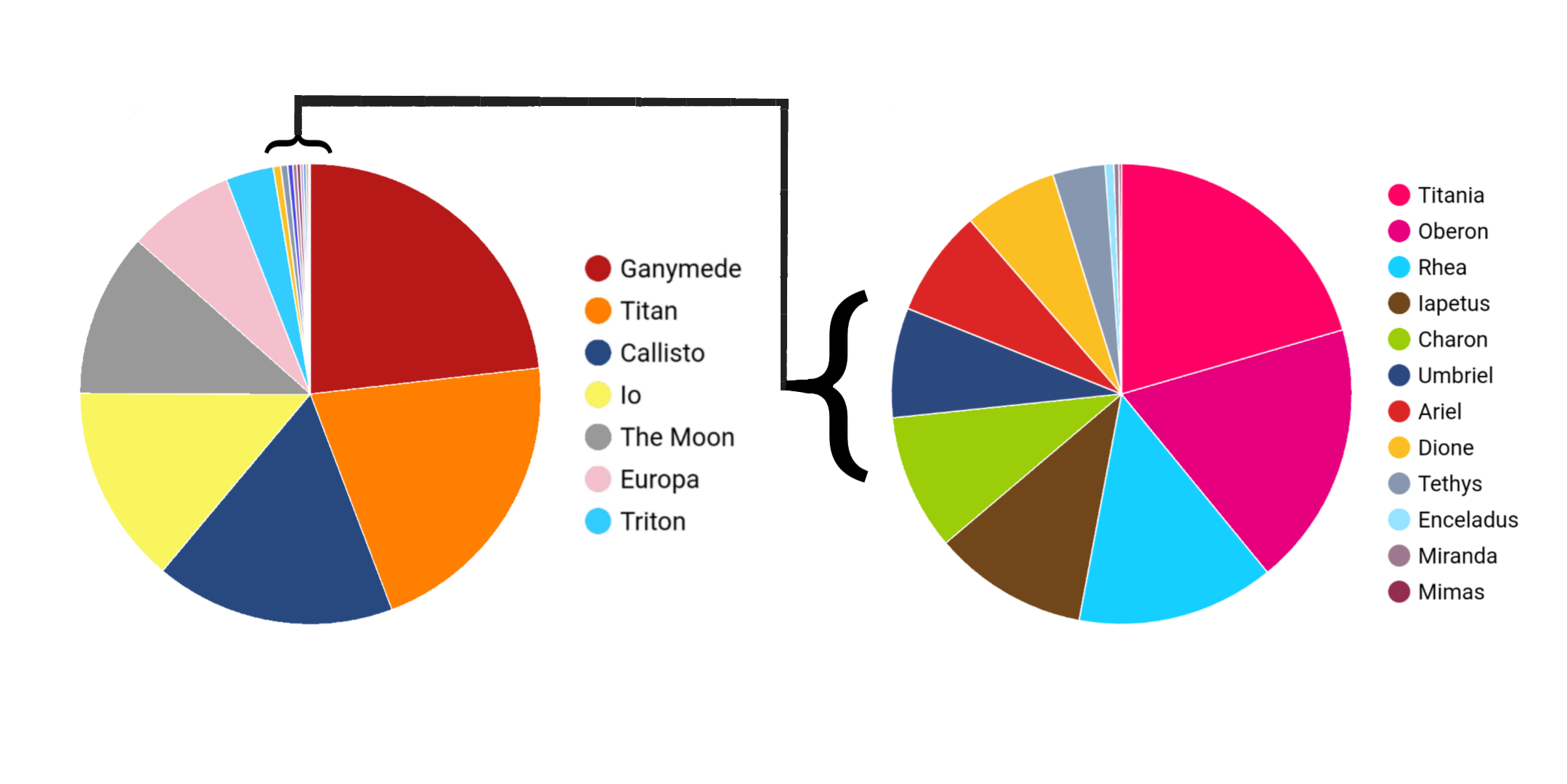
2 pie charts, one nested within the other, showing the relative masses of major Solar System moons

== Objects with radii over 400 km ==
The following objects have a nominal volumetric radius of 400 km or greater. It was once expected that any icy body larger than approximately 200 km in radius was likely to be in hydrostatic equilibrium (HE). However, Ceres (r = 470 km) is the smallest body for which detailed measurements are consistent with hydrostatic equilibrium, whereas Iapetus (r = 735 km) is the largest icy body that has been found to not be in hydrostatic equilibrium. The known icy moons in this range are all ellipsoidal (except Proteus), but trans-Neptunian objects up to 300–350 km radius may be quite porous.

For simplicity and comparative purposes, the values are manually calculated assuming that the bodies are all spheres. The size of solid bodies does not include an object's atmosphere. For example, Titan looks bigger than Ganymede, but its solid body is smaller. For the giant planets, the "radius" is defined as the distance from the center at which the atmosphere reaches 1 bar of atmospheric pressure.

Because Sedna and Aya have no known moons, directly determining their masses is impossible without sending a probe.

Body (Note: Name of body, including alternative names using Roman numerals to designate moons (such as "Saturn I" for Mimas), and numbers to designate minor planets)	Image	Radius (Note: Volumetric radius including uncertainties)		Volume		Mass		Surface area		Density	Gravity (Note: Given as surface gravity (1 bar for gaseous planets))		Type	Discovery
Body	Image	(km)	(R_{🜨})	(10^{9} km^{3})	(V_{🜨})	(10^{21} kg)	(M_{🜨})	(10^{6} km^{2})	🜨	(g/cm^{3})	(m/s^{2})	(🜨)	Type	Discovery
Sun		695700 ± ?	109.2	1,409,300,000	1,301,000	1988475000±92000	333,000	6,078,700	11,918	1.409	274.0	27.94	G2V-class star	prehistoric
Jupiter		69886±0.4	10.97	1,431,280	1,321	1898125±88	317.83	61,419	120.41	1.3262±0.0003	24.79	2.528	gas giant planet; has rings	prehistoric
Saturn		58232±6 (136775 for A Ring)	9.140	827,130	764	568317±26	95.162	42,612	83.54	0.6871±0.0002	10.44	1.065	gas giant planet; has rings	prehistoric
Uranus		25362±7	3.981	68,340	63.1	86809.9±4.0	14.536	8083.1	15.85	1.270±0.001	8.69	0.886	ice giant planet; has rings	1781
Neptune		24622±19	3.865	62,540	57.7	102409.2±4.8	17.147	7618.3	14.94	1.638±0.004	11.15	1.137	ice giant planet; has rings	1846
Earth		6371.0084±0.0001	1	1,083.21	1	5972.17±0.28	1	510.06447	1	5.5134±0.0003	9.81	1	terrestrial planet	prehistoric
Venus		6051.8±1.0	0.9499	928.43	0.857	4867.31±0.23	0.815	460.2	0.903	5.243±0.003	8.87	0.905	terrestrial planet	prehistoric
Mars		3389.5±0.2	0.5320	163.18	0.151	641.691±0.030	0.107	144.37	0.283	3.9340±0.0007	3.71	0.379	terrestrial planet	prehistoric
Ganymede; Jupiter III		2632.27±0.1	0.4135	76.30	0.0704	148.148±0.003 (Note: Calculated from its standard gravitational parameter GM = 9887.83±0.03 km^{3}/s^{2}.)	0.0248	86.999	0.171	1.9420±0.0048	1.428	0.146	moon of Jupiter (icy)	1610
Titan; Saturn VI		2574.765±0.018	0.4037 (Note: Radius estimated using equatorial radius and assuming body is spherical)	71.50	0.0658	134.5180354±0.0030232	0.0225	83.3054	0.163	1.8814±0.0001	1.354	0.138	moon of Saturn (icy)	1655
Mercury		2439.4±0.1	0.3829	60.83	0.0562	330.103±0.021	0.0553	74.797	0.147	5.4289±0.0007	3.70	0.377	terrestrial planet	prehistoric
Callisto; Jupiter IV		2410.3±1.5	0.3783	58.65	0.0541	107.594	0.018	73.005	0.143	1.834±0.003	1.23603	0.126	moon of Jupiter (icy)	1610
Io; Jupiter I		1824.2±0.2	0.2859	25.32	0.0234	89.296	0.015	41.698	0.082	3.5205	1.797	0.183	moon of Jupiter (terrestrial)	1610
Moon; Earth I		1737.4±0.1	0.2727	21.958	0.0203	73.46	0.0123	37.937	0.074	3.344±0.005	1.625	0.166	moon of Earth (terrestrial)	prehistoric
Europa; Jupiter II		1560.8±0.3	0.2450	15.93	0.0147	48.00	0.008035	30.613	0.06	3.013±0.005	1.316	0.134	moon of Jupiter (terrestrial)	1610
Triton; Neptune I		1353.4±0.9	0.2124	10.38	0.0096	21.39±0.03	0.003599	23.018	0.045	2.061	0.782	0.0797	moon of Neptune (icy)	1846
Pluto; 134340		1188.3±0.8	0.187	7.057	0.00651	13.03±0.03	0.0022	17.79	0.034	1.853±0.004	0.620	0.063	dwarf planet; plutino; multiple	1930
Eris; 136199		1163±6 (Note: Radius has been determined by various methods, such as optical (Hubble), thermal (Spitzer), or direct imaging via spacecraft)	0.1825	6.59	0.0061	16.38±0.2 (Note: The mass of Eris by itself is the difference between the mass of the system ((1.6466±0.0085)×10^{22} kg) and the mass of Dysnomia by itself ((8.2±5.7)×10^{19} kg).)	0.0028	17	0.033	2.43±0.05	0.824	0.083	dwarf planet; SDO; binary	2003
Titania; Uranus III		788.4±0.6	0.1237 (Note: Radius estimated by using three radii and assuming body is spheroid)	2.06	0.0019	3.338±0.022 (Note: Calculated from its standard gravitational parameter GM = 222.80±1.45 km^{3}/s^{2}.)	0.00059	7.82	0.015	1.63±0.05	0.378	0.0385	moon of Uranus	1787
Haumea; 136108		772+20 −19	0.12	1.98 (Note: Calculated in Wolfram Alpha using semi axes of 1050 × 840 × 537(Ellipsoid volume: 1.98395×10^9 km^{3}))	0.0018	3.95244+0.01109 −0.01103	0.00066	8.14	0.016	2.050+0.157 −0.152 (Note: Best fit physical model assuming hydrostatic equilibrium for Haumea.)	0.401	0.0409	dwarf planet; resonant KBO (7:12); trinary; has rings	2004
Rhea; Saturn V		764.045±0.13 (Note: Calculated as the geometric mean of the three axes ($\sqrt[3]{a\cdot b\cdot c}$).)	0.1199	1.87	0.0017	2.3064854±0.0000522	0.00039	7.34	0.014	1.2372±0.0029	0.26	0.027	moon of Saturn	1672
Oberon; Uranus IV		761.4±2.6	0.1195	1.85	0.0017	3.209±0.032 (Note: Calculated from its standard gravitational parameter GM = 214.21±2.14 km^{3}/s^{2}.)	0.0005	7.285	0.014	1.74±0.02	0.347	0.035	moon of Uranus	1787
Iapetus; Saturn VIII		734.4±2.8	0.1153	1.66	0.0015	1.806	0.00033	6.8	0.013	1.0887±0.0127	0.223	0.0227	moon of Saturn	1671
Makemake; 136472		715±7	0.112	1.53	0.0014	2.69±0.20 (Note: This value refers to the system mass)	0.00045	6.4	0.013	1.76±0.17	0.35	0.0357	dwarf planet; cubewano	2005
Gonggong; 225088		615±25	0.0983	1.03	0.0009	1.75±0.07	0.00029	4.753	0.009	1.74±0.16	0.3	0.0306	dwarf planet; resonant SDO (3:10)	2007
Charon; Pluto I		606.0±0.5	0.0951	0.932	0.0009	1.5897±0.0045	0.00025	4.578	0.009	1.705±0.006	0.288	0.0294	moon of Pluto	1978
Umbriel; Uranus II		582.4±0.8	0.0918	0.837	0.0008	1.280±0.010 (Note: Calculated from its standard gravitational parameter GM = 85.40±0.68 km^{3}/s^{2}.)	0.00020	4.3	0.008	1.55±0.01	0.234	0.024	moon of Uranus	1851
Ariel; Uranus I		578.9±0.6	0.0909	0.813	0.0007	1.2500±0.0084 (Note: Calculated from its standard gravitational parameter GM = 83.43±0.56 km^{3}/s^{2}.)	0.000226	4.211	0.008	1.54±0.01	0.269	0.027	moon of Uranus	1851
Dione; Saturn IV		561.4±0.4	0.0881	0.741	0.0007	1.0954868±0.0000246	0.000183	3.965	0.008	1.478±0.003	0.232	0.0237	moon of Saturn	1684
Quaoar; 50000		557.85±4.7	0.0879	0.737	0.0007	1.212±0.005	0.0002	3.83	0.008	1.667±0.043 (Note: The density value of ρ = 1.667±0.043 g/cm^{3} is calculated via the formula $\rho {{=}} \frac{M}{V} {{=}} \frac{M}{\frac{4}{3} \pi R^3}$, where M = (1.212±0.005)×10^{21} kg is Quaoar's mass from Proudfoot et al. (2025). and R = 557.8±4.7 km is the volume-equivalent radius from Margoti et al.'s 2026 paper on modeling Quaoar as an ellipsoid. The uncertainty of the density is calculated via propagation of uncertainty. This density had to be manually calculated since Margoti et al. (2026) used an outdated Quaoar mass ((1.208±0.063)×10^{21} kg) from Braga-Ribas et al. (2025).)	0.3	0.0306	dwarf planet; cubewano; binary (trinary?); has rings	2002
Tethys; Saturn III		531.0±0.6	0.0834	0.624	0.0006	0.6174959±0.0000146	0.000103	3.57	0.007	0.984±0.003	0.145	0.015	moon of Saturn	1684
Ceres; 1		469.7±0.1	0.0742	0.433	0.0004	0.938392±0.000005	0.000157	2.85	0.006	2.1616±0.0025	0.28	0.029	dwarf planet; belt asteroid	1801
Orcus; 90482		455+25 −20	0.0719	0.404	0.0004	0.548±0.010	0.000092			1.4±0.2	0.2	0.0204	dwarf planet; plutino; binary	2004
Sedna; 90377		450+160 −130	0.0711	0.516	0.0005								dwarf planet; sednoid; detached object	2003
Salacia; 120347		419±22	0.0664	0.373	0.0003	0.4861+0.0076 −0.0074	0.000082			1.50±0.12	0.185	0.0168	cubewano; binary	2004
Aya; 55565		401+28 −40	0.0629	0.270	0.00025	0.362 (Note: This mass value is only an assumption. The real mass of it is unmeasured, as it is not known to have a moon, which means there is currently no way to measure its mass and density.)	0.0000606	2.02	0.00396		0.150	0.0152	cubewano	2002
star giant planet terrestrial planet dwarf planet possible dwarf planet moon of Earth moon of Jupiter moon of Saturn moon of Uranus moon of Neptune moon of Pluto

== Smaller objects by mean radius ==
=== From 200 to 399 km ===
All imaged icy moons with radii greater than 200 km except Proteus are clearly round, although those under 400 km that have had their shapes carefully measured are not in hydrostatic equilibrium. The known densities of TNOs in this size range are remarkably low (1–1.2 g/cm^{3}), implying that the objects retain significant internal porosity from their formation and were never gravitationally compressed into fully solid bodies. Many intrinsically bright TNOs like 2018 VG18 and 2017 OF201 do not have directly measured sizes (e.g. via stellar occultation and radiometry of thermal emission), so their sizes are estimated based on an assumed albedo. In the list below, TNOs with unmeasured sizes are only listed if they have been mentioned in press releases and the scientific literature.

Body	Image	Radius (km)	Mass (10^{18} kg)	Density (g/cm^{3})	Type (Note: Figures from default source Johnston's Archive—List of Known Trans-Neptunian Objects, if otherwise not mentioned in the References column)	Refs (Note: Reference column specifically for radius (r) and mass (M) citations) r · M
Máni; 307261		398±12	–	–	cubewano	
Achlys; 208996		386±6 (area equivalent)	≈ 200 (Note: Mass calculated by Muñoz-Gutiérrez et al. (2019 & 2021) using Achlys's area-equivalent diameter of 772 km and predicted density of 0.87 g/cm^{3}. Muñoz-Gutiérrez et al. give the mass in terms of Earth masses (M_{🜨}), which can be converted into kilograms by multiplying by 5.9722×10^{24} kg/M_{🜨}. This calculation does not treat Achlys as an ellipsoid (which would have a volume of $V = \frac{4}{3} \pi a b c \approx 1.85 \times 10^{17} \text{ m}^{3}$), though the mass calculated from Achlys's ellipsoid volume and density ($M = \rho V \approx 1.61 \times 10^{20} \text{ kg}$) is equivalent to Muñoz-Gutiérrez et al.'s mass calculation when rounded to a single digit.)	0.87±0.01 (assuming HE)	plutino; binary	
2010 JO_{179} 574372		≈ 375±75 (Note: Radius estimated from an assumed albedo)	–	–	SDO	
Chiminigagua; 532037		371+39 −42	–	–	SDO; binary	
Varda; 174567		370±7	244±6 (Note: Using Grundy et al.'s working diameters of 361 km and 163 km, and assuming the densities of the two bodies are equal, Varda would contribute 91.6% of the system mass of (2.664±0.064)×10^{20} kg, meaning Varda's mass is about (2.44±0.06)×10^{20} kg.)	1.23±0.04 or 1.78±0.06	cubewano; binary	·
2021 DR15		≈358	–	–	SDO	
2017 OF201		≈ 350	–	–	eTNO	
Ixion; 28978		348.4+5.4 −4.4 (area equivalent)	–	–	plutino	
Goibniu; 90568		340±17	–	–	cubewano	
Ritona; 145452		340+28 −36	–	–	cubewano	
2015 RR245; 523794		≈ 335	–	–	resonant KBO (2:9)	
Uni; 55637		330±19	125±3	0.82±0.11	cubewano; binary	·
Varuna; 20000		327+77 −51	≈ 160	0.992+0.086 −0.015	cubewano	
2003 UZ_{413} 455502		325+0.5 −88	≈ 300 (Note: very approximate figure, assuming equivalent spherical diameter of ≈600 km and density ≈2.64 g/cm^{3})	2.64	plutino	
Rumina; 145451		≈ 322	–	–	SDO	
2014 UZ224 (DeeDee)		318+28 −30	–	–	SDO	
2026 ED138		317.5–795			cubewano	
Gǃkúnǁʼhòmdímà; 229762		317+5 −4	136.1±3.3	1.007+0.050 −0.049	SDO; binary	·
2008 OG_{19} 470599		310+28 −56	–	0.609±0.004	SDO	·
Dysnomia; Eris I		307.5+60 −50	82±57	0.7±0.5	moon of Eris	
2007 JJ_{43} 278361		305+85 −70	–	–	cubewano	
2004 XR_{190} (Buffy); 612911		300±85	–	–	SDO	
2005 QU_{182} 303775		292+78 −72	–	–	SDO	
2014 EZ_{51} 523692		> 288	–	–	SDO	
Xewioso; 78799		283+36 −37	–	–	cubewano	
2005 UQ_{513} 202421		~275	–	–	cubewano	
Geyagugv; 768325		275±75			eTNO	
Vesta; 4		262.7±0.1	259.0271±0.0058	3.456±0.035	belt asteroid type V	·
2003 VS_{2} 84922		262±4	–	–	plutino	
Pallas; 2		256±2	204±3	2.92±0.08	belt asteroid type B	
2004 TY_{364} 120348		256+19 −20	–	–	cubewano	
2005 TB_{190} 145480		254+64 −58	–	–	detached object	
Enceladus; Saturn II		252.1±0.2	108.0±0.1	1.609±0.005	moon of Saturn	·
2002 TC_{302} 84522		250±7	–	–	resonant SDO (2:5)	
2018 VG18 (Farout)		≈ 250	–	–	resonant SDO (2:9)	
Miranda; Uranus V		235.8±0.7	62.93±3.00	1.148	moon of Uranus	·
Dziewanna; 471143		235+18 −5	–	–	SDO	
2002 XV_{93} 612533		235+22 −15	–	–	plutino	
1999 DE_{9} 26375		231±23	–	–	resonant SDO (2:5)	
2003 FY_{128} 120132		230±11	–	–	SDO	
2012 VP113 (Biden)		≈ 225	–	–	sednoid	
2002 VR_{128} 84719		224+24 −22	–	–	plutino	
Vanth; Orcus I		221±5	87±8	1.5+1.0 −0.5	moon of 90482 Orcus	·
Hygiea; 10		216±4	87.4±6.9	2.06±0.20	belt asteroid type C	·
2004 NT_{33} 444030		212+44 −40	–	–	cubewano	
Proteus; Neptune VIII		210±7	15.5–31 (Note: A density of 0.4–0.8 g/cm^{3} was calculated when assuming the volume as a sphere with a radius of 210±7 km. The mass was calculated with the provided density and the assumed volume.)	≈ 0.46–0.91	moon of Neptune	·
Chaos; 19521		208+42 −15 equivalent	–	–	cubewano	
2001 QF_{298} 469372		204+20 −22	–	–	plutino	
Huya; 38628		203±8	40.1	1.073±0.066	plutino; binary	·
2004 PF_{115} 175113		203+49 −38	–	–	plutino	
Ilmarë; Varda I		202±20	22	–	moon of 174567 Varda	
Legend: SDO – scattered disc object cubewano – classical Kuiper belt object plutino – 2:3 orbital resonance with Neptune

=== From 100 to 199 km ===
This list contains a selection of objects estimated to be between 100 and 199 km in radius (200 and 399 km in diameter), being 200 km nicknamed the "potato radius" by astronomers. The largest of these may have a hydrostatic-equilibrium shape, but most are irregular (i.e., potato-shaped). Mass switches from 10^{21} kg to 10^{18} kg (Zg). Main-belt asteroids have orbital elements constrained by (2.0 AU < a < 3.2 AU; q > 1.666 AU) according to JPL Solar System Dynamics (JPLSSD). Many TNOs are omitted from this list as their sizes are poorly known.

Body	Image	Radius (km)	Mass (10^{18} kg)	Type	Refs r · M
2004 UX_{10} 144897		199+16 −20	≳ 30	plutino	·
1993 SC; 15789		199+55 −86	≈ 47	plutino	
Mimas; Saturn I		198.2±0.3	37.49±0.03	moon of Saturn	·
Actaea; Salacia I		196±16	20	moon of 120347 Salacia	
1998 SN_{165} 35671		196±20		cubewano	
2002 KX_{14} 119951		194.6±4.4		cubewano	
Hiʻiaka; Haumea I		185±10	16±2	moon of Haumea	·
2001 UR_{163} 42301		176±42		resonant KBO (4:9)	
Nereid; Neptune II		170±25	35.7	moon of Neptune	
1996 TL_{66} 15874		170±10		SDO	
2004 XA_{192} 230965		170+60 −48		SDO	
Interamnia; 704		166±3	35.2±5.1	belt asteroid type F	·
Europa; 52		160±2	23.9±3.8	belt asteroid type C	
2007 OC_{10} 470316		165±28		SDO	
1999 CD_{158} 469306		< 155	≈ 48	resonant KBO (4:7)	
2023 KQ14 (Ammonite)		150±40		sednoid	
Davida; 511		149±2	26.6±7.3	belt asteroid type C	
2002 TX_{300} 55636		143±5	≈ 11	cubewano, Haumea family	·
2003 OP_{32} 120178		137+24 −12.	≈ 45	cubewano, Haumea family	
Sylvia; 87		137±2	14.3±0.5	outer belt asteroid type X; trinary	
Lempo; 47171		136±9	6.71	plutino; trinary	
Eunomia; 15		135±2	30.5±1.9	belt asteroid type S	
Hyperion; Saturn VII		135±4	5.62±0.05	moon of Saturn	·
Euphrosyne; 31		134±2	16.5±2.6	belt asteroid type C; binary	
1998 SM_{165} 26308		134±14	6.87±1.8	resonant KBO (1:2)	·
Cybele; 65		131.5±1.5	14.8±1.8	outer belt asteroid type C	
Juno; 3		127±1	27.0±2.4	belt asteroid type S	
Mbabamwanawaresa; 184314		126+32 −10		TNO	
Hiisi; Lempo II		126±8	5.273	secondary of 47171 Lempo	
Hektor; 624		125±13	7.9±1.4	Jupiter trojan (L_{4}) type D; binary	·
Chariklo; 10199		124.8+3.0 −2.3	6.4±0.5	centaur; has rings	
Sila; 79360		124±15	5.89	cubewano; binary	
2007 RW_{10} 309239		124±15		quasi-satellite of Neptune	
Altjira; 148780		123+19 −70	2.388	cubewano; binary	
Nunam; 79360		118±15	4.892	secondary of 79360 Sila	
Bamberga; 324		114±2	10.2±0.9	belt asteroid type C	
Patientia; 451		112.9±2.3	10.9±5.3	belt asteroid type C	·
Psyche; 16		112±2	26.2±2.9	belt asteroid type M	
Ceto; 65489		112±5	5.4±0.4	extended centaur; binary	·
Herculina; 532		111.2±2.4	10	belt asteroid type S	
Moon of 148780 Altjira		110+17 −62	1.695	secondary of 148780 Altjira	
Leleākūhonua; 541132		110+14 −10		sednoid	
Thisbe; 88		109±2	11.6±2.2	belt asteroid type B	
Doris; 48		108±2	6.9±2.9	belt asteroid type C	
Phoebe; Saturn IX		106.5±0.7	8.29±0.01	moon of Saturn	·
Moon of 38628 Huya		106±15	5.1	moon of 38628 Huya	
Fortuna; 19		105.5±1.0	8.8±1.4	belt asteroid type G	
Camilla; 107		105±4	11.2±0.3	outer belt asteroid type C; trinary	·
Themis; 24		104±2	6.2±2.9	belt asteroid type C	
Amphitrite; 29		102±1	12.7±2.0	belt asteroid type S	
Egeria; 13		101±2	9.2±2.1	belt asteroid type G	
Iris; 7		100±5	13.5±2.3	belt asteroid type S	
Legend: centaur – asteroids orbiting between the outer planets Jupiter trojan – asteroids located in Jupiter's L_{4} and L_{5} Lagrange points

=== From 50 to 99 km ===
This list contains a selection of objects 50 and 99 km in radius (100 km to 199 km in average diameter). The listed objects currently include most objects in the asteroid belt and moons of the giant planets in this size range, but many newly discovered objects in the outer Solar System are missing, such as those included in the following reference. Asteroid spectral types are mostly Tholen, but some might be SMASS.

Body	Image	Radius (km)	Mass (10^{18} kg)	Type	Refs r · M
Elektra; 130		99.5±1	6.4±0.2	belt asteroid type G; multiple	
Bienor; 54598		99+3 −3.5	1.119	centaur	
Chiron; 2060 or 95P		98±17		centaur; has rings	
Hebe; 6		97.5±1.5	12.4±2.4	belt asteroid type S	
Larissa; Neptune VII		97±3	≈ 4.2	moon of Neptune	· (Note: The mass estimate is based on the assumed density of 1.2 g/cm^{3}, and a volume of 3.5 ×10^{6} km^{3} obtained from a detailed shape model in Stooke (1994).)
Ursula; 375		96.8±1.3	8.4±5.3	belt asteroid type C	·
Eugenia; 45		94±1	5.8±0.1	belt asteroid type F; trinary	
Hermione; 121		94±3	5.0±0.3	outer belt asteroid type C; binary	·
Daphne; 41		94±7	6.1±0.9	belt asteroid type C; binary	
Aurora; 94		93.8±3.6	6.2±3.6	belt asteroid type C	·
Bertha; 154		93.4±0.9	9.2±5.2	belt asteroid type C	·
1995 SM_{55} 24835		93.4±0.9		cubewano, Haumea family	
Moon of 532037 Chiminigagua		93±13		moon of 532037 Chiminigagua	
Tinia		90.4±0.3		moon of 55637 Uni	
Janus; Saturn X		89.5±1.4	1.898±0.001	moon of Saturn	·
Teharonhiawako; 88611		89+16 −18	2.44±0.03	cubewano; binary	·
Aegle; 96		88.9±0.8	6.4±6.3	belt asteroid type T	·
Galatea; Neptune VI		88±4	2.12±0.08	moon of Neptune	·
S/2015 (136472) 1 (MK2)		87.5	4.939	moon of Makemake	
Phorcys; Ceto I		87+8 −9	≈ 1.67	secondary of 65489 Ceto	·
Palma; 372		86.8±1.4	5.2±0.6	belt asteroid type B	·
Metis; 9		86.5±1	8.0±1.9	belt asteroid type S	·
Alauda; 702		86±28	6.06±0.36	belt asteroid type C; binary	·
Hilda; 153		85.3±1.6		outer belt asteroid; Hildas	
Himalia; Jupiter VI		85	4.2±0.6	moon of Jupiter	·
Freia; 76		84.2±1.0	2.0±4.2	outer belt asteroid type P/type X	·
Amalthea; Jupiter V		83.45±2.4	2.08±0.15	moon of Jupiter	·
Agamemnon; 911		83.3±2.0		Jupiter trojan (L_{4}) type D	
Elpis; 59		82.6±2.3	3±0.5	belt asteroid type CP/type B	·
Eleonora; 354		82.5±1.5	7.5±2.7	belt asteroid type A	
Nemesis; 128		81.5±2.5	3.4±1.7	belt asteroid type C	
Puck; Uranus XV		81±2	1.91	moon of Uranus	
2002 KW_{14} 307251		80+18 −20	≈ 30	cubewano	
Sycorax; Uranus XVII		78.5+11.5 −7.5		moon of Uranus	
Io; 85		77.4±1.9	2.6±1.5	belt asteroid type FC/type B	·
Minerva; 93		77.08±0.65	3.5±0.4	belt asteroid type C; trinary	·
Alexandra; 54		77.07±0.32	6.2±3.5	belt asteroid type C	·
Laetitia; 39		77±2	4.7±1.1	belt asteroid type S	·
Nemausa; 51		75±1.5	3.9±1.6	belt asteroid type G	
Kalliope; 22		75±2.5	7.7±0.4	belt asteroid type M; binary	
Despina; Neptune V		75±3	0.71	moon of Neptune	
Namaka; Haumea II		75±25	1.18±0.25	moon of Haumea	·
Manwë; 385446		≈ 75	≈ 1.41	resonant KBO (4:7); binary	·
Pales; 49		≈ 74.9	4.2±2.2	belt asteroid type C	·
Parthenope; 11		74.5±1	5.5±0.4	belt asteroid type S	
Arethusa; 95		74.0±2.4		belt asteroid type C	
Pulcova; 762		73.7±0.4	1.4±0.1	belt asteroid type F; binary	·
Weywot; Quaoar I		73±5	1.485±0.360	moon of Quaoar	·
Flora; 8		73±1	4.0±1.6	belt asteroid type S	
Ino; 173		72.5±1.5	2.2±1.3	belt asteroid type Xc	
Adeona; 145		72±1.5	2.4±0.3	belt asteroid type Xc	
Irene; 14		72±1	2.9±1.9	belt asteroid type S	·
Gǃòʼé ǃHú; Gǃkúnǁʼhòmdímà I		71±4		secondary of 229762 Gǃkúnǁʼhòmdímà	
Aglaja; 47		71±4	3.2±1.7	belt asteroid type C	·
Melpomene; 18		70.5±1	4.5±0.9	belt asteroid type S	
Lamberta; 187		70.5±1	1.9±0.3	belt asteroid type Ch	
Patroclus; 617		70.2±0.4	1.36±0.11	Jupiter trojan (L_{5}) type P; binary	·
Julia; 89		70±1.4	4.3±3.2	belt asteroid type S	
Typhon; 42355		69±4.5	0.87±0.03	resonant SDO (7:10); binary	·
ǂKá̦gára; 469705		69±12	1.29±0.07	cold classical KBO; binary	
Massalia; 20		67.8±1.8	5±1.04	belt asteroid type S	·
Portia; Uranus XII		67.6±4		moon of Uranus	
Emma; 283		66.2±0.1	1.38±0.03	belt asteroid type X; binary	·
Paha; Lempo I		66±4	0.746±0.001	moon of 47171 Lempo	·
Lucina; 146		65.9±?		belt asteroid type C	
Sawiskera; Teharonhiawako I		66+12 −13		secondary of 88611 Teharonhiawako	
Achilles; 588		65.0±0.3		Jupiter trojan (L_{4}) type DU	
Panopaea; 70		64.0±0.4	4.33±1.09	belt asteroid type C	·
Thule; 279		63.3±1.8		outer belt asteroid type D	
Borasisi; 66652		63+12 −26	3.433±0.027	cubewano; binary	·
Albion; 15760		≈ 62.5		TNO, first KBO discovered	
Hestia; 46		62.1±1.7	3.5	belt asteroid type P/type Xc	·
Leto; 68		61.3±1.6	3.28±1.9	belt asteroid type S	·
ǃHãunu ǂKá̦gára I		61±9	0.89±0.05	secondary of 469705 ǂKá̦gára	
Undina; 92		60.46±0.85	4.43±0.25	belt asteroid type X	·
Bellona; 28		60.45±1.90	2.62±0.15	belt asteroid type S	·
Diana; 78		60.30±1.35	1.27±0.13	belt asteroid type C	·
Anchises; 1173		60.2±1.5		Jupiter trojan (L_{5}) type P	
Bernardinelli-Bernstein; C/2014 UN_{271}		60±7		comet	
Galatea; 74		59.4±1.4	6.13±5.36	belt asteroid type C	·
Deiphobus; 1867		59.1±0.8		Jupiter trojan (L_{5}) type D	
Äneas; 1172		59.01±0.40		Jupiter trojan (L_{5}) type D	
Kleopatra; 216		59±1	3.0±0.3	belt asteroid type M; trinary	
Athamantis; 230		59±1	2.3±1.1	belt asteroid type S	
Diomedes; 1437		58.89±0.59		Jupiter trojan (L_{4}) type D	
Terpsichore; 81		58.9±0.4	6.19±5.31	belt asteroid type C	·
Epimetheus; Saturn XI		58.1±1.8	0.5266±0.0006	moon of Saturn	·
Victoria; 12		58±1	2.7±1.3	belt asteroid type S	
Circe; 34		57.7±1.0	≈ 3.66±0.03	belt asteroid type C	·
Leda; 38		57.7±0.7	5.71±5.47	belt asteroid type C	·
Odysseus; 1143		57.3±0.3		Jupiter trojan (L_{4}) type D	
Alcathous; 2241		56.8±0.9		Jupiter trojan (L_{5}) type D	
Melete; 56		56.62±0.85	4.61	belt asteroid type P	·
Mnemosyne; 57		56.3±1.4	≈ 12.6±2.4	belt asteroid type S	·
Nestor; 659		56.2±0.9		Jupiter trojan (L_{4}) type XC	
Harmonia; 40		55.6±0.2		belt asteroid type S	
Hesperia; 69		55±8	5.86±1.18	belt asteroid type M	·
Euterpe; 27		54.9±0.8	1.67±1.01	belt asteroid type S	·
Antilochus; 1583		54.4±0.3		Jupiter trojan (L_{4}) type D	
Thorondor; Manwë I		54	0.5	secondary of 385446 Manwë	·
Thalia; 23		53.8±1.1	1.96±0.09	belt asteroid type S	·
Erato; 62		53.5±0.3		belt asteroid type BU/type Ch	
Astraea; 5		53.3±1.6	2.9	belt asteroid type S	·
Pabu; Borasisi I		52+10 −21		secondary of 66652 Borasisi	
Eos; 221		51.76±2.8	≈ 5.87±0.34	belt asteroid type S/type K	·
Aegina; 91		51.7±0.2		belt asteroid type C	
Leukothea; 35		51.5±0.6		belt asteroid type C	
Menoetius; Patroclus I		51.4±0.25		secondary of 617 Patroclus	
Isis; 42		51.4±1.4	1.58±0.52	belt asteroid type S	·
Klotho; 97		50.4±0.3	1.33±0.13	belt asteroid type M	·
Troilus; 1208		50.3±0.5		Jupiter trojan (L_{5}) type FCU	

=== From 20 to 49 km ===
This list includes few examples since there are about 589 asteroids in the asteroid belt with a measured radius between 20 and 49 km. Many thousands of objects of this size range have yet to be discovered in the trans-Neptunian region. The number of digits is not an endorsement of significant figures. The table switches from ×10^{18} kg to ×10^{15} kg (Eg). Most mass values of asteroids are assumed.

Body	Image	Radius (km)	Mass (10^{15} kg)	Type – notes	Refs r · M
Asterope; 233		49.8±0.6		belt asteroid type T/type K	
Pholus; 5145		49.5+7.5 −7		centaur	
Thebe; Jupiter XIV		49±2		moon of Jupiter	
Lutetia; 21		49±1	1700±20	belt asteroid type M	
Kalypso; 53		49±13	≈ 5630±5000	belt asteroid type XC	·
Notburga; 626		48.4±2.3		belt asteroid type XC	
Proserpina; 26		47.4±0.8	748±895	belt asteroid type S	·
Juliet; Uranus XI		46.8±4		moon of Uranus	
Urania; 30		44±1	1300±900	belt asteroid type S	
Ausonia; 63		46.5±1.5	1200±200	belt asteroid type S	
Beatrix; 83		44.8±1.3		belt asteroid type X	
Concordia; 58		44.81±0.42		belt asteroid type C	
Echidna; Typhon I		44.5±3		moon of 42355 Typhon	
Automedon; 2920		44.29±0.90		Jupiter trojan (L_{4}) type D	
Antiope; 90		43.9±0.5	828±22	belt asteroid type C; binary	·
Prometheus; Saturn XVI		43.1±2.7	159.5±1.5	moon of Saturn	·
Danaë; 61		43.0±1.1	2890±2780	belt asteroid type S	·
Thetis; 17		42.4±1.0	1200	belt asteroid type S	·
Pandora; 55		42.4±1.3		belt asteroid type M	
Huenna; 379		42.39±0.78	383±19	belt asteroid type B/type C; binary	·
Virginia; 50		42.04±0.12	2310±700	belt asteroid type X/type Ch	·
Feronia; 72		42.0±2.0	≈ 3320±8490	belt asteroid type TDG	·
S/2000 (90) 1 Antiope I		41.9±0.5		secondary of 90 Antiope	
Poulydamas; 4348		41.07±0.31		Jupiter trojan (L_{5}) type C	
Logos; 58534		41±9	458±6.9	cubewano; binary	·
Pandora; Saturn XVII		40.7±1.5	137.1±1.9	moon of Saturn	·
Thalassa; Neptune IV		40.7±2.8		moon of Neptune	
Niobe; 71		40.4±0.4		belt asteroid type S	
Pomona; 32		40.4±0.8		belt asteroid type S	
Belinda; Uranus XIV		40.3±8		moon of Uranus	
Elara; Jupiter VII		40.0±1.7		moon of Jupiter	
Cressida; Uranus IX		39.8±2		moon of Uranus	
Amycus; 55576		38.2±6.2		centaur	
Hylonome; 10370		37±8		centaur	
Socus; 3708		37.83±0.40		Jupiter trojan (L_{5}) type C	
Nysa; 44		37.5+1.5 −0.5	576±143 (Note: Fuentes-Muñoz et al. (2025) give Nysa's mass in terms of the standard gravitational parameter GM = 0.038444658±0.009560725 km^{3} s^{−2} (or after converting to SI units, (3.8444658±0.9560725)×10^{7} m^{3} s^{−2}). This can be converted into mass (M) by dividing GM (in SI units) by the gravitational constant G = 6.6743×10^{−11} m^{3}⋅kg^{−1}⋅s^{−2}. The resulting mass of Nysa is approximately M = (5.76±1.43)×10^{17} kg.)	belt asteroid type E; binary	
Rosalind; Uranus XIII		36±6		moon of Uranus	
Maja; 66		35.90±0.46		belt asteroid type C	
Ariadne; 43		35.67±0.63	≈ 1210±220	belt asteroid type S	·
Iphigenia; 112		35.54±0.26	≈ 1970±6780	belt asteroid type C	·
Xiangliu; Gonggong I		≈ 35±15		moon of 225088 Gonggong	
Dike; 99		33.68±0.21		belt asteroid type C	
Echeclus; 60558 or 174P		32.3±0.8		centaur	
Desdemona; Uranus X		32±4		moon of Uranus	
Eurybates; 3548		31.94±0.15		Jupiter trojan (L_{4}) type CP	
Eurynome; 79		31.74±0.48		belt asteroid type S	
Eurydike; 75		31.19±0.80		belt asteroid type M	
Phocaea; 25		30.53±1.23	599±60	belt asteroid type S	·
Naiad; Neptune III		30.2±3.2		moon of Neptune	
Schwassmann– Wachmann 1; 29P		30.2±3.7		comet	
Angelina; 64		29.15±0.54		belt asteroid type E	
Pasiphae; Jupiter VIII		28.9±0.4		moon of Jupiter	
Alkmene; 82		28.81±0.36		belt asteroid type S	
Nessus; 7066		28.5±8.5		centaur	
Polana; 142		27.41±0.14		belt asteroid type F	
Bianca; Uranus VIII		27±2		moon of Uranus	
Mathilde; 253		26.4	103.3±4.4	belt asteroid type C	·
Hidalgo; 944		26.2±1.8		centaur	
Orus; 21900		25.40±0.40		Jupiter trojan (L_{4}) type C/type D	
Amalthea; 113		25.07±0.63		belt asteroid type S; binary	
Prospero; Uranus XVIII		≈ 25		moon of Uranus	
Setebos; Uranus XIX		≈ 24		moon of Uranus	
Carme; Jupiter XI		23.35±0.45		moon of Jupiter	
Klytia; 73		22.30±0.47		belt asteroid type S	
Echo; 60		21.61±0.29	315±32	belt asteroid type S	·
Metis; Jupiter XVI		21.5±2	≈ 119.893	moon of Jupiter	·
Ophelia; Uranus VII		21.4±4		moon of Uranus	
Lysithea; Jupiter X		21.1±0.35		moon of Jupiter	
Caliban; Uranus XVI		21+10 −6		moon of Uranus	
Cordelia; Uranus VI		20.1±3		moon of Uranus	

=== From 1 to 19 km ===
This list contains some examples of Solar System objects between 1 and 19 km in radius. This is a common size for asteroids, comets and irregular moons.

Body	Image	Radius (km)	Mass (10^{15} kg)	Type – notes	Refs r · M
Urda; 167		19.968±0.132		belt asteroid type S	
Hydra; Pluto III		19.65	48±42	moon of Pluto	·
Siarnaq; Saturn XXIX		19.65±2.95		moon of Saturn	
Koronis; 158		19.513±0.231		belt asteroid type S	
Nix; Pluto II		19.017	45±40	moon of Pluto	·
Ganymed; 1036		18.84±0.20	≈ 167±318	Amor asteroid type S	·
Okyrhoe; 52872		18±0.6		centaur	
Helene; Saturn XII		17.6±0.4		moon of Saturn; Dione trojan (L_{4})	
Sinope; Jupiter IX		17.5±0.3		moon of Jupiter	
Hippocamp; Neptune XIV		17.4±1	≈ 50	moon of Neptune	·
Leucus; 11351		17.08±0.32		Jupiter trojan (L_{4}) type D	
Stephano; Uranus XX		≈ 16		moon of Uranus	
Arrokoth; 486958		15.85±0.25		cubewano; contact binary	
Ida; 243		15.7	42±6	belt asteroid type S; binary	·
Atlas; Saturn XV		15.1±0.9	6.6	moon of Saturn	·
Great comet C/1811 F1		15 - 20		comet	
Ananke; Jupiter XII		14.55±0.3		moon of Jupiter	
Albiorix; Saturn XXVI		14.3±2.7		moon of Saturn	
Linus; Kalliope I		14±1	≈ 60	asteroid moon of 22 Kalliope	·
Dioretsa; 20461		14±3		centaur; damocloid	
Pan; Saturn XVIII		13.7±0.3	4.30±0.22	moon of Saturn	·
Perdita; Uranus XXV		13±1		moon of Uranus	
Telesto; Saturn XIII		12.4±0.4		moon of Saturn; Tethys trojan (L_{4})	
Mab; Uranus XXVI		12±1		moon of Uranus	
Phobos; Mars I		11.1±0.15	10.659	moon of Mars	·
Paaliaq; Saturn XX		≈ 11		moon of Saturn	
Francisco; Uranus XXII		≈ 11		moon of Uranus	
Leda; Jupiter XIII		10.75±0.85		moon of Jupiter	
Calypso; Saturn XIV		10.7±0.7		moons of Saturn; Tethys trojan (L_{5})	
Polymele; 15094		10.548±0.068		Jupiter trojan (L_{4}) type P	
Cupid; Uranus XXVII		9±1		moon of Uranus	
Ymir; Saturn XIX		≈ 9		moon of Saturn	
Trinculo; Uranus XXI		≈ 9		moon of Uranus	
Eros; 433		8.42±0.02	6.687±0.003	Amor asteroid type S	·
Adrastea; Jupiter XV		8.2±2		moon of Jupiter	
Kiviuq; Saturn XXIV		≈ 8		moon of Saturn	
Tarvos; Saturn XXI		≈ 7.5		moon of Saturn	
Kerberos; Pluto IV		≈ 6.333	16±9	moon of Pluto	·
Gaspra; 951		6.266	20–30	belt asteroid type S	·
Deimos; Mars II		6.27±0.07	1.51	moon of Mars	·
Skamandrios; Hektor I		6±1.5		asteroid moon of 624 Hektor	
Ijiraq; Saturn XXII		≈ 6		moon of Saturn	
Tsuchinshan–ATLAS; C/2023 A3		<5.9±0.2		comet	
Halley's Comet; 1P		5.75	0.22	comet	·
Styx; Pluto V		≈ 5.5	≈ 7.65	moon of Pluto	·
Romulus; Sylvia I		5.4±2.8		asteroid moon of 87 Sylvia	
Masursky; 2685		5.372±0.085		belt asteroid type S	
Erriapus; Saturn XXVIII		≈ 5		moon of Saturn	
Callirrhoe; Jupiter XVII		4.8±0.65		moon of Jupiter	
Alexhelios; Kleopatra I		4.45±0.8		asteroid moon of 216 Kleopatra	
Esclangona; 1509		4.085±0.3		inner belt asteroid type S; binary	
Themisto; Jupiter XVIII		≈ 4		moon of Jupiter	
Daphnis; Saturn XXXV		3.8±0.8	0.077±0.015	moon of Saturn	·
Petit-Prince; Eugenia I		3.5±1		asteroid moon of 45 Eugenia	
Praxidike; Jupiter XXVII		3.5±0.35		moon of Jupiter	
Bestla; Saturn XXXIX		≈ 3.5		moon of Saturn	
Remus; Sylvia II		≈ 3.5		asteroid moon of 87 Sylvia	
Kalyke; Jupiter XXIII		3.45±0.65		moon of Jupiter	
Cleoselene; Kleopatra II		3.45±0.8		asteroid moon of 216 Kleopatra	
Moon of 31 Euphrosyne		3.35±1.2		asteroid moon of 31 Euphrosyne	
Tempel 1; 9P		3±0.1		Jupiter-family comet; Deep Impact flyby and impacted	
Ireland; 5029		3		belt asteroid	
Phaethon; 3200		2.9		Apollo asteroid type F	
1999 JM_{8} 53319		2.7±0.6		Apollo asteroid type X	
Borrelly; 19P		2.66		Jupiter-family comet	
Šteins; 2867		2.58±0.084		belt asteroid type E	
Atira; 163693		2.4±0.25		Atira asteroid type S; binary	
Annefrank; 5535		2.4		belt asteroid type S	
Balam; 3749		2.33±0.11	0.51±0.02	belt asteroid type S; trinary	·
Pallene; Saturn XXXIII		2.22±0.07		moon of Saturn	
Florence; 3122		2.201±0.015	0.079±0.002	Amor asteroid type S; trinary	·
Wild 2; 81P		2.133		Jupiter family comet	
Litva; 2577		2.115		Mars-crosser type EU; trinary	
Churyumov–Gerasimenko; 67P		2	0.00998	Jupiter-family comet	·
Donaldjohanson; 52246		1.948±0.007		belt asteroid type C	
Camelot; 9500		1.9		belt asteroid	
Cuno; 4183		1.826±0.051		Apollo asteroid type S/type Q	
1986 DA; 6178		1.575		Amor asteroid type M	
Pichi üñëm Alauda I		1.55±0.45		asteroid moon of 702 Alauda	
Toutatis; 4179		1.516	0.0505	Apollo asteroid type S	·
Kaʻepaokaʻāwela; 514017		1.5		Jupiter co-orbital	
Methone; Saturn XXXII		1.45±0.03		moon of Saturn	
Carpo; Jupiter XLVI		1.44		Moon of Jupiter	
Gault; 6478		1.4+0.2 −0.1		Phocaea asteroid type S	
1998 QE_{2} 285263		1.375		Amor asteroid type S; binary	
Polydeuces; Saturn XXXIV		1.3±0.4		moon of Saturn; Dione trojan (L_{5})	
2001 SN_{263} 153591		1.315±0.2	0.00951±0.00013	Amor asteroid type C; trinary	·
S/2003 (1509) 1 Moon of 1509 Esclangona		1.285		asteroid moon of 1509 Esclangona	
APL; 132524		≈ 1.25		belt asteroid type S	
Camillo; 3752		1.153±0.044		Apollo asteroid type S	
Cruithne; 3753		1.036±0.053		Aten asteroid type Q; quasi-satellite of Earth	
1996 HW1; 8567		1.01		Amor asteroid	

=== Below 1 km ===
This list contains examples of objects below 1 km in radius. That means that irregular bodies can have a longer chord in some directions, hence the mean radius averages out. In the asteroid belt alone there are estimated to be between 1.1 and 1.9 million objects with a radius above 0.5 km, many of which are in the range 0.5–1.0 km. Countless more have a radius below 0.5 km. Very few objects in this size range have been explored or even imaged. The exceptions are objects that have been visited by a probe, or have passed close enough to Earth to be imaged. Radius is by mean geometric radius. Number of digits not an endorsement of significant figures. Mass scale shifts from × 10^{15} to 10^{9} kg, which is equivalent to one billion kg or 10^{12} grams (Teragram – Tg). Currently most of the objects of mass between 10^{9} kg to 10^{12} kg (less than 1000 teragrams (Tg)) listed here are near-Earth asteroids (NEAs). The Aten asteroid 1994 WR_{12} has less mass than the Great Pyramid of Giza, 5.9 × 10^{9} kg. For more about very small objects in the Solar System, see meteoroid, micrometeoroid, cosmic dust, and interplanetary dust cloud. (See also Visited/imaged bodies.)

Object	Image	Radius (m)	Mass (10^{9} kg)	Type – notes	Refs r · M
Ra-Shalom; 2100		990±25		Aten asteroid type C	
Geographos; 1620		980±30		Apollo asteroid type S	
Midas; 1981		975±35		Apollo asteroid type S	
Mithra; 4486		924.5±11		Apollo asteroid type S	
2006 VW_{139} 300163		900±0.1		Active asteroid	
1998 OH; 12538		831.5±164.5		Apollo asteroid type S	
Tantalus; 2102		824.5±22.5		Apollo asteroid type Q	
Braille; 9969		820		Mars-crosser type Q	
2005 GO_{21} 308242		780		Aten asteroid type S	
Apollo; 1862		≈ 750		Apollo asteroid type Q	
1999 JD_{6} 85989		731±10.5		Aten asteroid type K; contact binary	
Icarus; 1566		730		Apollo asteroid type S	
Dactyl; Ida I		700		asteroid moon of 243 Ida	
Castalia; 4769		700		Apollo asteroid type S; contact binary	
2007 PA_{8} 214869		675±70		Apollo asteroid type Q	
Moshup; 66391		658.5±20	2490±54	Aten asteroid type S; binary	·
1950 DA; 29075		653	≈ 2000	Apollo asteroid type S	·
2006 HY_{51} 394130		609±114		Apollo asteroid	
Hartley 2; 103P		570±80	≈ 300	Jupiter-family comet	·
2003 SD_{220} 163899		515		Aten asteroid type S	
Nyx; 3908		500±75		Amor asteroid type V	
Wikipedia; 274301		475		Vestian asteroid	·
Astronautica; 100000		470		Hungaria asteroid type E	·
2001 WN_{5} 153814		466±5.5		Apollo asteroid	
2017 YE5		450±25		Apollo asteroid type S; binary	
Ryugu; 162173		432.5±7.5	≈ 450	Apollo asteroid type Cg	·
1997 AE_{12} 162058		423.5±6.5		Amor asteroid type S	
2014 JO_{25} 671294		409		Apollo asteroid type S; contact binary	
Hermes; 69230		400±50		Apollo asteroid type Sq	
Didymos; 65803		390±4	527	Apollo asteroid type Xk; binary	·
Dinkinesh; 152830		369		belt asteroid type Sq	
Aten; 2062		365±15		Aten asteroid type S	
Aegaeon; Saturn LIII		330±60		moon of Saturn	
2015 TB145		325±15		Apollo asteroid type S	
2001 WR_{1} 172034		315.5±9		Amor asteroid type S	
1994 CC; 136617		310±30	266±32.9	Apollo asteroid type Sq; trinary	·
LINEAR; 252P		300±30		Jupiter-family comet	
Golevka; 6489		265±15		Apollo asteroid type Q	
ATLAS; 3I		260 - 374		Interstellar comet	
2000 WO_{107} 153201		255±41.5		Aten asteroid type X	
Bennu; 101955		245.03±0.08	78±9	Apollo asteroid type B	·
Torifune; 98943		232.5±7.5		Apollo asteroid	
2002 CU_{11} 163132		230±8.5		Apollo asteroid	
Squannit; Moshup I		225.5±13.5		asteroid moon of 66391 Moshup	
2014 HQ124		204.5±84		Aten asteroid type S	
2013 YP139		201±13		Apollo asteroid	
2008 EV_{5} 341843		200±7		Aten asteroid type X/type C	
2006 DP_{14} 388188		≈ 200		Apollo asteroid type S; contact binary	
1988 EG; 6037		199.5±1.35		Apollo asteroid type S	
2010 TK_{7} 706765		189.5±61.5		Aten asteroid; Earth trojan (L_{4})	
2006 SU_{49} 292220		≈ 188.5	≈ 73	Apollo asteroid	·
2005 YU_{55} 308635		180±20		Apollo asteroid type C	
2010 SO_{16} 419624		178.5±63		Apollo asteroid; co-orbital with Earth	
Itokawa; 25143		173	35.1±1.05	Apollo asteroid type S	·
Nereus; 4660		165		Apollo asteroid	
Apophis; 99942		162.5±7.5	≈ 61	Aten asteroid type Sq	·
S/2009 S 1		≈ 150		moon of Saturn	
2005 WK_{4} 277475		142		Apollo asteroid type S	
2004 BL_{86} 357439		131.5±13		Apollo asteroid type V; binary	
2007 TU24		125		Apollo asteroid type S	
Zoozve; 524522		≈ 118		Aten asteroid type X; co-orbital with Venus	
2011 UW_{158} 436724		110±20		Apollo asteroid type S	
Hathor; 2340		105±0.015		Aten asteroid type S	
Dimorphos; Didymos I		85±15		asteroid moon of 65803 Didymos	
Cardea; 164207		81.5		Apollo asteroid; quasi-satellite of Earth	
2017 BQ6		78		Apollo asteroid type S	
1994 WR12		65		Aten asteroid	
YORP; 54509		61.8		Apollo asteroid type S	
2019 OK		28.5 – 165		Apollo asteroid	
Duende; 367943		23.75		Aten asteroid type L	
Kamoʻoalewa; 469219		20.5		Apollo asteroid type S; quasi-satellite of Earth	
2012 TC4		11.5		Apollo asteroid type E/type Xe	
2014 RC		≈ 11		Apollo asteroid type Sq	
1998 KY26		5.5±1		Apollo asteroid type E	
2010 RF12		≈ 3.5	≈ 0.0005	Apollo asteroid	
2011 MD		3+2 −1		Apollo asteroid/Amor asteroid type S	
2020 VT4		2.5 - 5.5		Aten asteroid	
2012 KT42		2.1 - 4.7		Apollo asteroid	
2008 TC3		2.05	0.00008	Apollo asteroid type F/type M	
2023 BU		1.5		Apollo asteroid	
2015 TC25		1		Apollo asteroid type E	
2018 LA		0.8 - 2.6		Apollo asteroid	·
2025 TF		0.6 - 1.35		Apollo asteroid	
2011 CQ1		0.5 - 1.15		Aten asteroid	
2020 CD3		0.45±0.05		Apollo asteroid	
2020 CW		0.41 - 0.9		Apollo asteroid	
2008 TS26		0.305 - 0.68		Apollo asteroid	
2015 FF415		0.25		Apollo asteroid	·
2024 BX1		0.22		Apollo asteroid	
2025 UC11		0.205 - 0.465		Aten asteroid	
2022 WJ1		0.2 - 0.3		Apollo asteroid	
EN131090		0.1425 - 0.15	0.000000044	Apollo asteroid	

== Gallery ==
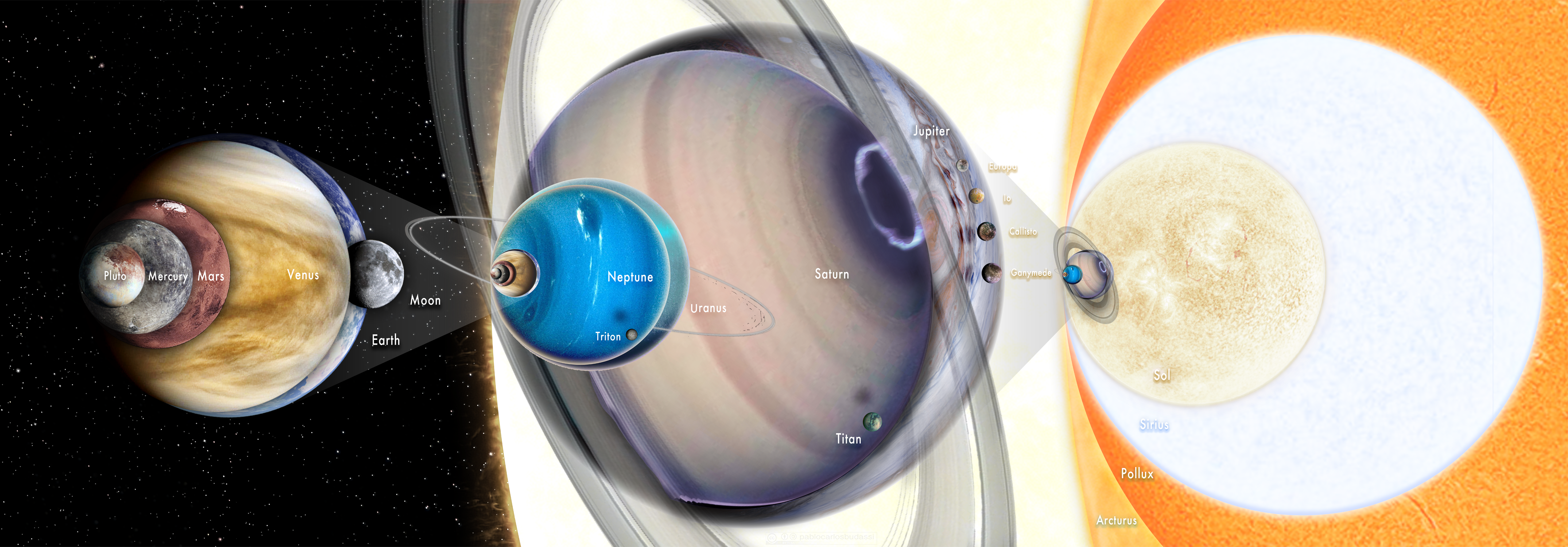
Solar System planets, major moons, and 3 stars of different sizes are shown comparatively in three levels of zoom: one for the rocky planets, one for the gas giants, and one for the stars.

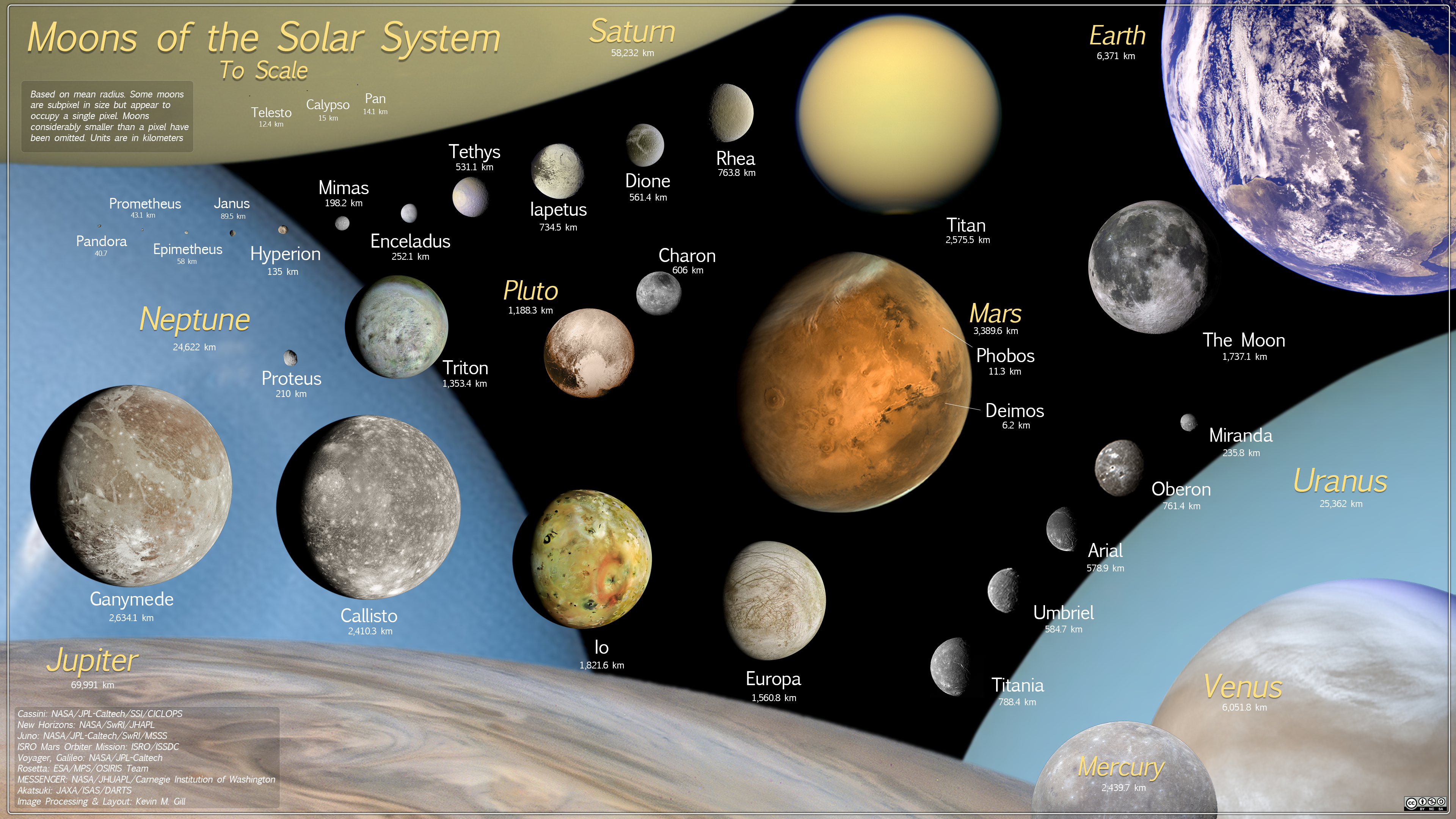
Largest moons of the Solar System to scale.

== See also ==
- List of gravitationally rounded objects of the Solar System
- List of dwarf planets
- List of minor planets
- List of natural satellites
- List of Solar System objects most distant from the Sun
- List of space telescopes
- Lists of astronomical objects
