= (470316) 2007 OC10 =

Elongated scattered-disc object

(470316) 2007 OC_{10}
Discovery
- Discovered by: Megan Schwamb, Michael E. Brown
- Discovery site: Palomar Obs. (Using the Samuel Oschin telescope)
- Discovery date: July 22, 2007

Designations
- Minor planet category: TNO; SDO; Detached object

Orbital characteristics(barycentric) (Note: These orbital elements are expressed in terms of the Solar System Barycenter (SSB) as the frame of reference. Due to planetary perturbations, the Sun revolves around the SSB at non-negligible distances, so heliocentric-frame orbital elements and distances (such as those given in JPL's Small-Body Database) can vary on short timescales.)
- Epoch 2 March 2019 (JD 2458544.5)
- Uncertainty parameter 1
- Observation arc: 6716 days (18.39 years)
- Aphelion: 64.4304 AU
- Perihelion: 35.4579 AU
- Semi-major axis: 49.94416 AU
- Eccentricity: 0.29005
- Orbital period (sidereal): 352.968 years
- Mean anomaly: 11.8479°
- Mean motion: 0° 0^{m} 10.053^{s} / day
- Inclination: 21.654°
- Longitude of ascending node: 258.0456°
- Argument of perihelion: 52.3971°
- Known satellites: 0
- Earth MOID: 34.4869 AU

Physical characteristics
- Dimensions: 430+20 −14 km × 282+48 −46 km
- Mean diameter: 330+56 −55 km (area equivalent); 308.5+44.7 −44.3 km
- Geometric albedo: 0.112+0.021 −0.050; 0.1529+0.0443 −0.044
- Spectral type: CO_{2}-type ("double-dip"); B-V = 0.86±0.07; V-R = 0.57±0.07; V-I = 1.01±0.09 (Note: Estimates of color indices from SsoCard is: B-V = 0.8674±0.0783, V-R = 0.5533±0.07, V-I = 1.0233±0.0722)
- Apparent magnitude: 21.02 (2022); 21.14±0.166 (2014); 20.98±0.05 (2009)
- Absolute magnitude (H): 5.21; 5.40±0.02 (2025); 5.70±0.32 (2018)

(470316) 2007 OC_{10} is a trans-Neptunian object. It was discovered on 22 July 2007, by Megan Schwamb and Michael E. Brown in images taken by the Samuel Oschin telescope at the Palomar Observatory in California.

2007 OC_{10} is a scattered disc object, a group of TNOs that have distant, inclined, and eccentric orbits that come close to Neptune at perihelion. 2007 OC_{10} measures approximately 330+56
−55 km in diameter, and has an elongated shape with semi-axes of 430+20
−14 km × 282+48
−46 km. It has a projected axis ratio of b/a = 0.58±0.16. The geometric albedo or reflectivity of 2007 OC_{10} is approximately 0.11+0.02
−0.05.

== Observation history ==
=== Discovery ===
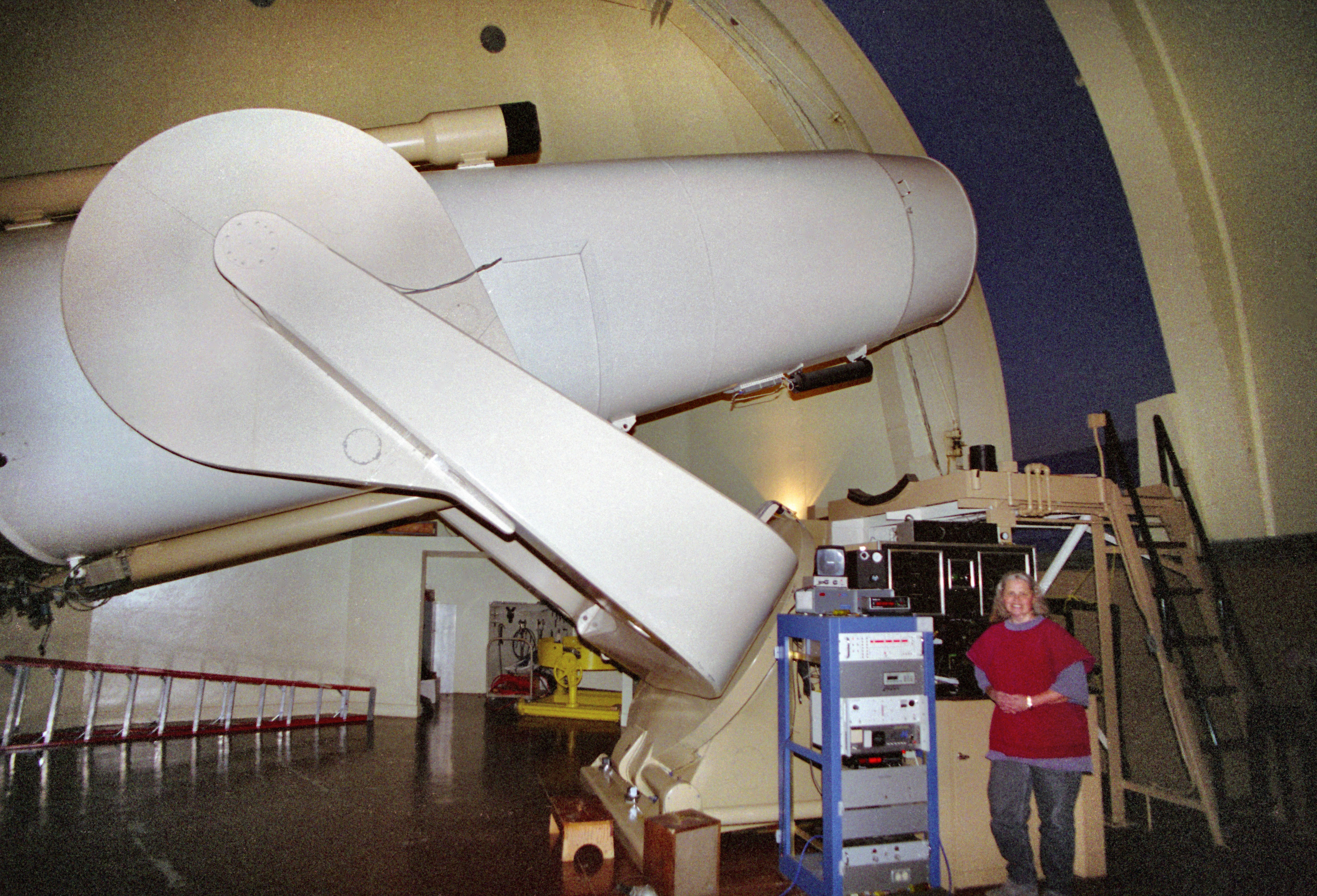
The 1.2-meter Samuel Oschin telescope that was used to discover 2007 OC_{10} at Palomar Observatory on 22 July 2007

2007 OC_{10} was discovered on 22 July 2007, by Megan Schwamb and Michael E. Brown of the California Institute of Technology using discovery images taken by the 1.2-meter Samuel Oschin telescope at the Palomar Observatory in California. It was found as part of the Palomar Distant Solar System Survey, which aimed to find objects in the region around Sedna, farther than 50 AU from the Sun. The survey was designed to detect the movements of objects that were at least 1,000 AU from the Sun. The discovery was announced on 6 September 2007, and was confirmed in 2008 by the 1.5-meter Cassegrain telescope, also at the Palomar Observatory.

=== Further observations ===
The observation arc of 2007 OC_{10} begins with the official discovery observation on 22 July 2007. Since then, 2007 OC_{10} has been observed by various telescopes, including the Herschel Space Observatory and ground-based telescopes. As of September 2026, a total of 449 observations have been recorded over a period of 18.39 years (which is its observation arc). The most recent observation was made on 10 December 2025 at the F51 – Pan-STARRS 1, Haleakala. 2007 OC_{10} has not been imaged by high-resolution telescopes yet, so it does not have any known natural satellites or moons, which means there is currently no way to measure its mass and density. 2007 OC_{10} is scheduled for observation with the Hubble Space Telescope in 2026.

=== 2022 Double star occultation ===
Comparison of occultation predictions of 2007 OC_{10}

Occultation data of 2007 OC_{10}

A stellar occultation occurs when an astronomical object passes in front of a star, blocking the star's light temporarily. A 2025 study led by Gómez-Limón predicted an occultation of the star Gaia DR3 2727866328215869952, which has a visible apparent magnitude of 15.23, by 2007 OC_{10} on 22 August 2022. Four observation stations successfully detected the occultation. They determined the size, shape, and geometric albedo of 2007 OC_{10}. The occultation data show that Gaia DR3 2727866328215869952 is actually a double star. The secondary star is approximately 1.18±0.07 magnitudes fainter than the primary star. It has an angular separation of 57+4
−11 mas, and a position angle of 56+3
−17 degrees with respect to the primary star.

== Provisional designation and numbering ==
The object was formally given the provisional designation 2007 OC_{10} by the Minor Planet Center on 6 September 2007. The provisional designation of 2007 OC_{10} indicates the date of its first observation: the first letter represents the second half of July and the second letter and numbers mean that it is the 253rd object first observed during that half-month. (Note: The second letter 'C' indicates that it is the 3rd object discovered on the 11th cycle of discoveries. Each completed cycle consists of 25 letters representing discoveries, hence 3 + (10 completed cycles × 25 letters) = 253.) Minor planets like 2007 OC_{10} frequently receive a permanent catalog number once their orbits are sufficiently known to be recoverable. 2007 OC_{10} has already met this criterion and has thus been numbered. 2007 OC_{10} was later assigned the minor planet number 470316 by the IAU. As of 2026, 2007 OC_{10} has not been given an official name by the International Astronomical Union. 2007 OC_{10} is a scattered-disc object, so the International Astronomical Union usually gives these kinds of objects mythological names.

== Orbit and classification ==
2007 OC_{10} is a trans-Neptunian object orbiting the Sun at a semi-major axis or average orbital distance of approximately 49.9 astronomical units. It follows a highly tilted and elliptical orbit, with an eccentricity of 0.290 and inclination of 21.7° with respect to the ecliptic. During its 350-year orbital period, 2007 OC_{10} comes within 35.5 AU from the Sun at perihelion and up to 64.4 AU at aphelion.

2007 OC_{10} belongs to the scattered disc, which is a population of TNOs that have distant, inclined, and eccentric orbits that come close to Neptune at perihelion. The scattered-disc population, which includes the dwarf planets Eris and Gonggong, is strongly influenced by Neptune's gravitational perturbations and consequently experience gravitational scattering. 2007 OC_{10} is classified as a scattered disc object by Johnston's Archive.

== Physical characteristics ==
=== Size and shape ===
The second largest asteroid, 4 Vesta and Trans-Neptunian object 2007 OC_{10} size and true color comparison.

History of diameter estimates for 2007 OC_{10}
| Year of Publication | Diameter (km) | Method | References |
|---|---|---|---|
| 2012 | 309±37 | Thermal (Herschel) | |
| 2013 | 315 | Radiometric measurement | |
| 2025 | 330+56 −55 | Occultation | |

Observations of stellar occultations show that 2007 OC_{10} is a highly flattened and elongated object with an equatorial diameter of 430+20
−14 km and a polar diameter of approximately 282+48
−46 km. 2007 OC_{10} measures approximately 330+56
−55 km in area equivalent diameter, and has a projected axis ratio of b/a = 0.58±0.16. For comparison, this makes it approximately 1/7 the size of the dwarf planet Pluto (Note: Pluto has a radius of 1,188.3 km (738.4 mi), which translates to a diameter of 2,376.6 km (1,476.8 mi). 1/7 of Pluto's diameter is 339.5 km (211.0 mi), which is roughly around 2007 OC_{10}'s size of 330+56 −55 km.) or 7/20 the size of Ceres. (Note: Ceres has a radius of 469.7 km (291.9 mi), which translates to a diameter of 939.4 km (583.7 mi). 7/20 of Ceres's diameter is 328.8 km (204.3 mi), which is roughly around 2007 OC_{10}'s size of 330+56 −55 km.) It is the third smallest TNO with an occultation-derived shape as of 2025.

As of 2026, it is unknown whether 2007 OC_{10} has an atmosphere. However, it is unlikely since theoretical models predict that TNOs smaller than 2,000 km (1,200 mi) in diameter generally cannot gravitationally hold onto atmospheres over billion-year timescales.

=== Mass and density ===
2007 OC_{10} has not been imaged by high-resolution telescopes yet, so it does not have any known natural satellites or moons, which means there is currently no way to measure its mass and density. 2007 OC_{10} is scheduled for observation with the Hubble Space Telescope in 2026, if those observations discover a moon, they could lead to a measurement of the mass and density of 2007 OC_{10}.

=== Interior and Grundy's hypothesis ===
2007 OC_{10}'s size is large enough that Mike Brown classified it as a possible dwarf planet, putting it in the "possibly" zone. However, scientists such as William M. Grundy have proposed the class of "mid-sized" TNOs between 400 and 1,000 km (250 and 620 mi) in diameter, which are believed to represent the transition between small, low-density TNOs and large, high-density dwarf planets. Planetary scientists have hypothesized that mid-sized TNOs in the lower range of 400–1000 km should have highly porous and unheated interiors, because TNOs in the lower range of the zone (such as Uni and Gǃkúnǁʼhòmdímà) have been found to have low densities around 1 g/cm^{3}. Since 2007 OC_{10} has an estimated diameter of only 330 km, it falls below this transition zone.

=== Surface ===
==== Composition and spectrum ====
Spectrum of 2007 OC_{10} is shown on the top.

The spectrum and surface composition of 2007 OC_{10} is classified as a CO_{2}-type ("double-dip") TNO. These objects are most regularly found on dynamically excited orbits such as those in the hot classical Kuiper belt. (Note: The "double-dip" TNO spectral type were later renamed to the "CO_{2}-type" in 2025.) The CO_{2}-type TNO has 2 adjacent absorption minima in the 3 μm region, making a double dip shape. its spectra is mostly dominated by carbon dioxide ices, carbon monoxide ices, and isotopologue ices, with other irradiation products like light hydrocarbons. The CO_{2}-type TNOs such as 2007 OC_{10} is the most common spectral type in the DiSCo sample. It is hypothesized that 2007 OC_{10} has gone through clustering.

==== Color, albedo, brightness and visibility from Earth ====
2007 OC_{10}’s albedo has been measured to be 0.112+0.021
−0.050. It has color indices of: B-V = 0.86±0.07, V-R = 0.57±0.07, and V-I of 1.01±0.09, for comparison, such B-V color index is highly similar to that of the dwarf planet Makemake's. It has an apparent magnitude of 21.02. The absolute visual magnitude (Hv) of 2007 OC_{10} is approximately measured at 5.40±0.02 in 2025. which is slightly brighter than previously thought.

== Search for moons ==
If 2007 OC_{10} has a moon, there is a 95% chance that the moon is smaller than 262 km in diameter, a 90% chance that it is smaller than 225 km, and an 80% that its diameter is smaller than 178 km. A 2026 study found that 2007 OC_{10} has no moons bigger than 131.2 km in diameter.

== See also ==
- (84922) 2003 VS2 a mid-sized trans-Neptunian object
- (612533) 2002 XV93 a mid-sized trans-Neptunian object
- (144897) 2004 UX10 a similarly sized trans-Neptunian object
- List of trans-Neptunian objects
- List of minor planets: 470001–471000
