= Echidna (disambiguation) =

Echidnas are Australian egg-laying mammals also known as spiny anteaters.

Echidna may also refer to:

- Echidna (mythology), monster in Greek mythology and eponym of the mammal
- (42355) Typhon I Echidna, the natural satellite of the asteroid 42355 Typhon
- ECHIDNA, high-resolution neutron powder diffractometer at Australia's research reactor OPAL
- Echidna (Re:Zero), a character in the light novel series Re:Zero − Starting Life in Another World
- Echidna, character in the video game The Bouncer
- Echidna (Devil May Cry), a demoness in the video game Devil May Cry 4
- Echidna, the Denizen of the Land of Frost and Frogs and the Land of Rays and Frogs in the webcomic Homestuck

== Taxonomic genera ==
- Echidna (fish) J. R. Forster, 1788, a genus of moray eels
- Echidna Cuvier, 1797, a junior homonym referring to the mammals commonly known as echidnas
- Echidna Merrem, 1820, junior homonym for a genus of African snakes now treated as Bitis

== See also ==
- Knuckles the Echidna, character from the Sonic the Hedgehog video game series
- Echidna Parass, fictional character from the Black Cat series
