= (455502) 2003 UZ413 =

Rapidly rotating plutino

(455502) 2003 UZ_{413}
- Hubble Space Telescope image of 2003 UZ_{413} taken in 2008

Discovery
- Discovered by: M. E. Brown; D. L. Rabinowitz; C. A. Trujillo
- Discovery date: 21 October 2003

Designations
- Minor planet category: TNO plutino (Note: Buie page actually says that the TNO is in a 3:2 resonance with Neptune. These objects are commonly referred to as "Plutino")

Orbital characteristics(barycentric) (Note: These orbital elements are expressed in terms of the Solar System Barycenter (SSB) as the frame of reference. Due to planetary perturbations, the Sun revolves around the SSB at non-negligible distances, so heliocentric-frame orbital elements and distances (such as those given in JPL's Small-Body Database) can vary on short timescales.)
- Epoch 27 April 2019 (JD 2458600.5)
- Uncertainty parameter 2
- Observation arc: 63.25 years (23103 days)
- Earliest precovery date: 29 July 1954
- Aphelion: 47.976 AU (7.1771 Tm)
- Perihelion: 30.246 AU (4.5247 Tm)
- Semi-major axis: 39.111 AU (5.8509 Tm)
- Eccentricity: 0.22666
- Orbital period (sidereal): 244.60 yr (89,340.7 d)
- Mean anomaly: 113.43°
- Mean motion: 0° 0^{m} 14.51^{s} / day
- Inclination: 12.04938°
- Longitude of ascending node: 135.922°
- Argument of perihelion: 145.06°
- Known satellites: 0

Physical characteristics
- Dimensions: 650+1 −175 km (upper limit); 472+122 −25 km (lower limit)
- Mean density: 2.29–3.00 > [2003 UZ_{413}'s density] >0.72 g/cm^{3} 2.64 g/cm^{3} (Note: assuming HE and thus a dwarf planet)
- Sidereal rotation period: 4.13±0.05 h 4.13 h
- Geometric albedo: 0.151+0.025 −0.064 (upper limit); 0.075+0.076 −0.006 (lower limit)
- Spectral type: Prominent water (H_{2}O/"bowl" type); V–R=0.45±0.04; BB taxon (blue/neutral) (Note: equivalent to V-I=0.75±0.06, B-V=0.68±0.06 and V-R=0.39±0.05); V−R=0.46±0.06; R−I=0.37±0.06
- Apparent magnitude: 21
- Absolute magnitude (H): 4.38±0.05; 4.26 (assumed)

(455502) 2003 UZ_{413} is a trans-Neptunian object (TNO) with an absolute magnitude of 4.38. It is in a 2:3 orbital resonance with Neptune, making it a plutino.

== History ==
=== Discovery ===
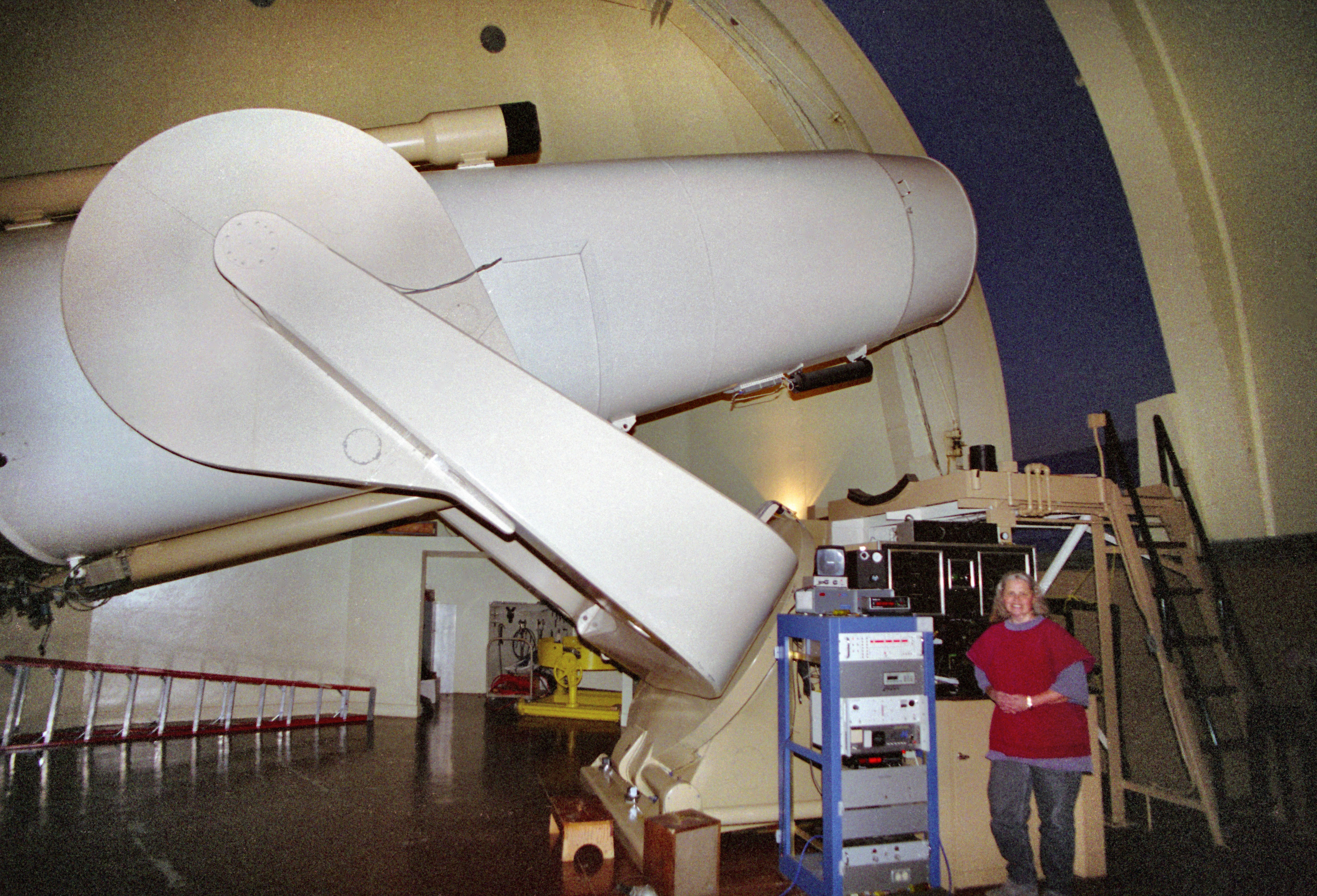
The Samuel Oschin telescope, the telescope that discovered 2003 UZ_{413}.

2003 UZ_{413} was discovered on 21 October 2003, by astronomers Michael E. Brown, Chad Trujillo, and David L. Rabinowitz. The discovery took place at the Palomar Observatory in San Diego, California. The team found the moving object using images taken by a wide-field camera mounted on the 1.2-meter Samuel Oschin Telescope.

It was given the minor planet number 455502 on 22 February 2016.

=== Further observations ===
As of 26 December 2025, its orbit has been secured by 513 observations across 29 oppositions, with precovery images as far back as 27 July 1954.

== Orbit and classification ==
2003 UZ_{413} orbits the Sun at a distance of 30.2–48.0 astronomical units (AU) with a semi-major axis or average orbital distance of 39.1 AU once every 244 years (for reference, Neptune's orbit is at 30.1 AU). Its orbit has a relatively high eccentricity of 0.23 and an inclination of 12.05° with respect to the ecliptic.

2003 UZ_{413} is classified as a plutino. 2003 UZ_{413} is in a 2:3 resonance with Neptune, which means that when it makes two revolutions around the Sun, Neptune makes exactly three.

== Physical characteristics ==
=== Size and albedo ===
The mean diameter of 2003 UZ_{413} is estimated to be 650+1
−175 km, assuming a low albedo of 0.075+0.076
−0.006.

As of 2026, it is unknown whether if 2003 UZ_{413} has an atmosphere. However, it is unlikely as theoretical predictions that TNOs smaller than 2,000 km (1,200 mi) in diameter generally cannot gravitationally hold onto atmospheres over billion-year timescales.

=== Rotation, shape and density ===
The object rotates very fast, with a period of about 4.13 hours. It was recognized as the fastest rotator known in the Kuiper belt after Haumea in 2009.

Given its rapid rotation, if it is in hydrostatic equilibrium (and thus a dwarf planet) it must have a density higher than 0.72 g/cm^{3}. Stable Jacobi ellipsoids with an axis ratio of a/b ≥ 1.13±0.03, as implied by its light-curve amplitude of Δm = 0.13±0.03, exist for densities in the range of 2.29−3.00 g/cm^{3}. Johnston's Archive reports 2.64 g/cm^{3}, in the center of that range. This would make it an outlier among similarly sized TNOs, which usually have significantly lower densities, and are thought to rarely be dwarf planets.

=== Composition and spectrum ===
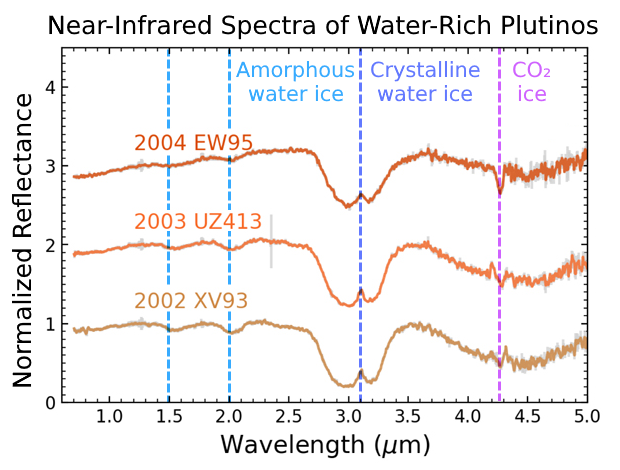
Near-infrared spectra of three water ice-rich plutinos observed by JWST, including 2003 UZ_{413} in the middle. Water and carbon dioxide ices are present in all three objects.

In visible light, this object is neutral or slightly red in color and has a flat, featureless reflectance spectrum. 2003 UZ_{413} has a water ice-rich composition, similar to plutinos such as 2004 EW95 and 2002 XV93. These TNOs are often classified as "prominent water"-type or "Bowl"-type TNOs. Their near-infrared spectra have a bowl-shaped water ice absorption band at around 3.0 μm wavelength.
