= (162058) 1997 AE12 =

Asteroid

(162058) 1997 AE_{12}
Discovery
- Discovered by: Spacewatch
- Discovery site: Kitt Peak National Obs.
- Discovery date: 10 January 1997

Designations
- Minor planet category: NEO; Amor

Orbital characteristics
- Epoch 4 September 2017 (JD 2458000.5)
- Uncertainty parameter 0
- Observation arc: 22.50 yr (8,218 days)
- Aphelion: 3.6785 AU
- Perihelion: 1.0554 AU
- Semi-major axis: 2.3670 AU
- Eccentricity: 0.5541
- Orbital period (sidereal): 3.64 yr (1,330 days)
- Mean anomaly: 296.49°
- Mean motion: 0° 16^{m} 14.52^{s} / day
- Inclination: 4.8519°
- Longitude of ascending node: 304.82°
- Argument of perihelion: 60.820°
- Earth MOID: 0.0881 AU (34.3 LD)

Physical characteristics
- Dimensions: 0.782 km (calculated); 0.847±0.013 km
- Synodic rotation period: 1880±595 h (Note: Pravec (2003) web: rotation period 1880±595 hours with a brightness amplitude of 0.6 mag. Quality code of 2. Summary figures at Collaborative Asteroid Lightcurve Link (CALL) for (162058) and Pravec's unpublished data comment:"P=1880 h derived assuming a symmetric curve, error perhaps a couple hundred hours. PAR=0. Ampl >0.6 mag")
- Geometric albedo: 0.186±0.020; 0.20 (assumed)
- Spectral type: S; Q
- Absolute magnitude (H): 17.8; 17.9

(162058) 1997 AE_{12} is a stony, sub-kilometer asteroid and likely the slowest rotator known to exist. It is classified as a near-Earth object of the Amor group and measures approximately 800 meters in diameter. The asteroid was discovered on 10 January 1997 by the Spacewatch survey at Kitt Peak National Observatory near Tucson, Arizona.

== Orbit and classification ==
1997 AE_{12} is an Amor asteroid, a group of near-Earth object that approach the orbit of Earth from beyond, but do not cross it. It orbits the Sun at a distance of 1.1–3.7 AU once every 3 years and 8 months (1,330 days). Its orbit has an eccentricity of 0.55 and an inclination of 5° with respect to the ecliptic.

Published by the Digitized Sky Survey, a first precovery was taken at the Australian Siding Spring Observatory in July 1992, extending the body's observation arc by more than 4 years prior to its official discovery observation at Kitt Peak.

=== Close approaches ===
1997 AE_{12} occasionally makes close approaches to Earth and Mars. It has an Earth minimum orbital intersection distance of 0.0881 AU (13,200,000 km), which is about 34.3 lunar distances.

Its closest recorded approach to Earth took place on 30 August 2003, when the asteroid came within 0.1238 AU (18,500,000 km) from Earth. It will come closer still on 8 October 2145, when it will be within 0.1042 AU (15,590,000 km) from Earth. The asteroid will make its closest approach to Mars on 29 December 2054 when it will come within 0.0376 AU (5,620,000 km) from the planet.

== Physical properties ==
=== Spectral type ===
1997 AE_{12} is a rare Q-type asteroid with a very dark surface, reflecting only about 7% of the light it receives. It has also been described a common stony S-type asteroid.

=== Rotation ===
The most unusual feature of 1997 AE_{12}, however, is its exceptionally slow rotation period of 1880±595 hours, or approximately 11 weeks (U=2). It holds the record for being the slowest-rotating asteroid discovered so far. Its precise period with a smaller error margin still needs to be determined. The lightcurve also showed a high brightness variation of at least 0.6 magnitude, which is indicative for a non-spherical shape. The asteroid may also be in a tumbling motion, but observations are not sufficient to determine any non-principal axis rotation.

Like other slowly-rotating asteroids such as 912 Maritima, it is possible that the extremely long period of this asteroid is caused by YORP radiation pressure slowing down the asteroid's rotation. This is especially likely considering that 1997 AE_{12} has a very low albedo, which would allow it to absorb more radiant energy from the Sun. Furthermore, the YORP effect has also been observed on other Q-type asteroids such as 1862 Apollo.

=== Diameter and albedo ===
According to the survey carried out by the NEOWISE mission of NASA's Wide-field Infrared Survey Explorer, 1997 AE_{12} measures 0.847 kilometers in diameter and its surface has an albedo of 0.186. The Collaborative Asteroid Lightcurve Link assumes a standard albedo for stony asteroids of 0.20 and calculates a diameter of 0.782 kilometers based on an absolute magnitude of 17.9.

== Naming ==
As of 2017, this asteroid remains unnamed.
