= 65489 Ceto =

Binary trans-Neptunian object

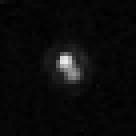
- Hubble Space Telescope image of Ceto and Phorcys, taken in 2006

Discovery
- Discovered by: C. A. Trujillo and M. Brown
- Discovery site: Palomar
- Discovery date: 22 March 2003

Designations
- Pronunciation: /ˈsiːtoʊ/
- Named after: Ceto
- Alternative designations: 2003 FX_{128}
- Minor planet category: TNO; Centaur–extended
- Adjectives: Cetoan /siːˈtoʊən/ or Cetoian /siːˈtoʊ.iən/

Orbital characteristics
- Epoch 13 January 2016 (JD 2457400.5)
- Uncertainty parameter 2
- Observation arc: 9239 days (25.30 yr)
- Aphelion: 187.74 AU (28.086 Tm)
- Perihelion: 17.8498 AU (2.67029 Tm)
- Semi-major axis: 102.79 AU (15.377 Tm)
- Eccentricity: 0.82635
- Orbital period (sidereal): 1042.22 yr (380669.7 d)
- Mean anomaly: 9.1219°
- Mean motion: 0.00094570°/day
- Inclination: 22.266°
- Longitude of ascending node: 171.85°
- Argument of perihelion: 320.086°
- Known satellites: Phorcys /ˈfɔːrsɪs/ (171±10 ~ 132+6 −14 km in diameter)
- Earth MOID: 16.895 AU (2.5275 Tm)
- Jupiter MOID: 12.7433 AU (1.90637 Tm)

Physical characteristics
- Dimensions: 223±10 km 174+16 −18 km
- Mass: (5.4±0.4)×10^{18} kg (system)
- Mean density: 1.37 g/cm^{3} (system)
- Equatorial surface gravity: 3.3 cm/s^{2}
- Synodic rotation period: 4.43 h (0.185 d)
- Geometric albedo: 0.056±0.006; 0.084±0.02
- Absolute magnitude (H): 6.54±0.06, 6.4

65489 Ceto, as a binary also (65489) Ceto–Phorcys (provisional designation 2003 FX_{128}), is a binary trans-Neptunian object (TNO) discovered on March 22, 2003, by Chad A. Trujillo and Michael Brown at Palomar. It is named after the sea goddess Ceto from Greek mythology. It came to perihelion in 1989.

== Physical characteristics ==
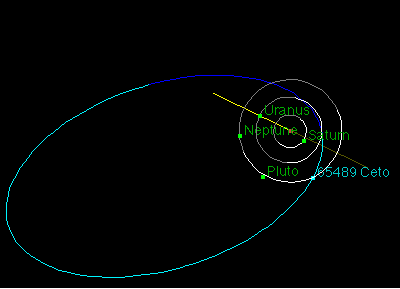
Polar view of Ceto's orbit

Ceto is an example of a close binary TNO system in which the components are of similar size. Combined observations with the infrared Spitzer Space Telescope and the Hubble Space Telescope allow the diameter of Ceto itself to be estimated at 174+16
−18 km and the diameter of Phorcys at 132+6
−14 km, assuming equal albedo for both components.

The binary nature of Ceto enables direct calculation of the system mass, allowing estimation of the masses of the components and providing additional constraints on their composition. The estimated density of Ceto is 1.37+0.66
−0.32 g/cm^{3}, significantly less than that of the large TNOs (Haumea: 3.0 g/cm^{3}, Eris: 2.26, Pluto: 2.03, Charon: 1.65) but significantly more than that of smaller TNOs (e.g. 0.7 g/cm^{3} for (26308) 1998 SM165). Phorcys has a mass of about 1.67×10^{18} kg. Unless the bodies are porous, the density is consistent with rock–ice composition, with rock content around 50%.

It has been suggested that tidal forces, together with other potential heat sources (e.g. collisions or ^{26}Al decay) might have raised the temperature sufficiently to crystallise amorphous ice and reduce the void space inside the object. The same tidal forces could be responsible for the quasi-circular orbits of the components of Ceto.

== Satellite ==
Phorcys
Discovery
- Discovered by: Keith S. Noll et al.
- Discovery date: 2006 April 11

Designations
- Pronunciation: /ˈfɔːrsɪs/
- Named after: Phorcys
- Alternative designations: (65489) Ceto I
- Adjectives: Phorcynian /fɔːrˈsɪniən/, Phorcyan /ˈfɔːrsiən/

Orbital characteristics
- Satellite of: Ceto

Physical characteristics
- Dimensions: 171±10; 132+6 −14 km. primary/secondary ratio 0.76±0.01
- Apparent magnitude: ΔM = 0.56±0.03

Ceto's satellite was identified as a binary on April 11, 2006, by K. Noll, H. Levison, W. Grundy and D. Stephens using the Hubble Space Telescope; the object was named Phorcys after the Greek sea god, formally (65489) Ceto I. Using an extended definition of a centaur as an object on a non-resonant (unstable) orbit with its perihelion inside the orbit of Neptune, the Ceto system can be considered the second known binary centaur.

Phorcys's diameter has been estimated to be 171±10 and 132+6
−14 km.

== See also ==
- List of Solar System objects by size
