= (120132) 2003 FY128 =

Trans-Neptunian object

(120132) 2003 FY_{128}
Discovery
- Discovered by: NEAT
- Discovery date: 26 March 2003

Designations
- Minor planet category: detached object

Orbital characteristics
- Epoch 13 January 2016 (JD 2457400.5)
- Uncertainty parameter 3
- Observation arc: 8159 days (22.34 yr)
- Aphelion: 62.551 AU (9.3575 Tm)
- Perihelion: 37.066 AU (5.5450 Tm)
- Semi-major axis: 49.809 AU (7.4513 Tm)
- Eccentricity: 0.25584
- Orbital period (sidereal): 351.53 yr (128397 d)
- Mean anomaly: 28.257°
- Mean motion: 0° 0^{m} 10.094^{s} / day
- Inclination: 11.757°
- Longitude of ascending node: 341.68°
- Argument of perihelion: 175.26°
- Known satellites: 0
- Earth MOID: 36.0755 AU (5.39682 Tm)
- Jupiter MOID: 31.6621 AU (4.73658 Tm)

Physical characteristics
- Dimensions: 460±21 km
- Synodic rotation period: 8.54 h (0.356 d)
- Geometric albedo: 0.079±0.010
- Temperature: 45.4 K (perihelion)
- Spectral type: CO_{2}-type ("double-dip")
- Absolute magnitude (H): 4.8

(120132) 2003 FY_{128} is a trans-Neptunian object with a diameter of about 460 km. It orbits the Sun at a distance of about 49.81 astronomical units. It was discovered on 26 March 2003 by the NEAT program at the Palomar Observatory, California.

== Orbital Classification ==
It is classified as a detached object by the Deep Ecliptic Survey (DES), since its orbit appears to be beyond the current control of Neptune. Though, if Neptune migrated outward, there would have been a period when Neptune had a higher eccentricity.
