= (230965) 2004 XA192 =

Kuiper belt object

(230965) 2004 XA_{192}
Discovery
- Discovered by: Palomar
- Discovery date: 12 December 2004

Designations
- Minor planet category: SDO (near or extended)

Orbital characteristics
- Epoch 13 January 2016 (JD 2457400.5)
- Uncertainty parameter 3
- Observation arc: 9268 days (25.37 yr)
- Earliest precovery date: 29 August 1989
- Aphelion: 58.967 AU (8.8213 Tm)
- Perihelion: 35.465 AU (5.3055 Tm)
- Semi-major axis: 47.216 AU (7.0634 Tm)
- Eccentricity: 0.24888
- Orbital period (sidereal): 324.44 yr (118503 d)
- Mean anomaly: 356.376°
- Mean motion: 0° 0^{m} 10.936^{s} / day
- Inclination: 38.07711°
- Longitude of ascending node: 328.7517°
- Argument of perihelion: 132.632°
- Known satellites: 0
- Earth MOID: 34.588 AU (5.1743 Tm)
- Jupiter MOID: 30.7418 AU (4.59891 Tm)
- T_{Jupiter}: 4.703

Physical characteristics
- Dimensions: 549 km 339+120 −95 km
- Synodic rotation period: 7.88 h (0.328 d)
- Sidereal rotation period: 7.88
- Geometric albedo: 0.09 (assumed); 0.26+0.34 −0.15
- Temperature: 45 K (perihelion)
- Spectral type: CO_{2}-type ("double-dip")
- Apparent magnitude: 19.84
- Absolute magnitude (H): 4.2; 4.42±0.63; 4.6

(230965) 2004 XA_{192} is a Kuiper-belt object with a diameter of 339+120
−95 km. It has an absolute magnitude of approximately 4.42, and albedo around 26%. It was discovered on 12 December 2004 at Palomar Observatory.

It is currently at 35.8 AU from the Sun, near its perihelion.
