= 42355 Typhon =

Scattered disc object

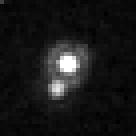
- Hubble Space Telescope image of Typhon and its moon Echidna, taken in 2006

Discovery
- Discovered by: NEAT
- Discovery date: 5 February 2002

Designations
- Pronunciation: /ˈtaɪfɒn/
- Named after: Τυφών Typhōn
- Alternative designations: 2002 CR_{46}
- Minor planet category: SDO; Centaur
- Adjectives: Typhonian /taɪˈfoʊniən/
- Symbol: (rare)

Orbital characteristics
- Epoch 13 January 2016 (JD 2457400.5)
- Uncertainty parameter 2
- Observation arc: 9563 days (26.18 yr)
- Aphelion: 58.982252 AU (8.8236193 Tm)
- Perihelion: 17.545721 AU (2.6248025 Tm)
- Semi-major axis: 38.263987 AU (5.7242110 Tm)
- Eccentricity: 0.5414560
- Orbital period (sidereal): 236.70 yr (86453.7 d)
- Mean anomaly: 14.61898075°
- Mean motion: 0° 0^{m} 14.991^{s} / day
- Inclination: 2.4252078°
- Longitude of ascending node: 351.9098598°
- Argument of perihelion: 159.3215723°
- Known satellites: 1 (Echidna)
- T_{Jupiter}: 4.692

Physical characteristics
- Dimensions: 186+16 −12 × 168±12 × 130+18 −16 km
- Mean diameter: 162±7 km
- Mass: (1.06±0.08)×10^{18} kg
- Mean density: 0.66+0.09 −0.08 g/cm^{3}
- Synodic rotation period: 9.67 h (0.403 d)
- Geometric albedo: 0.044±0.003
- Spectral type: Prominent water (H_{2}O/"bowl" type); B−R=1.29±0.07 V−I=0.99±0.04
- Absolute magnitude (H): 7.72±0.004

42355 Typhon (/ˈtaɪfɒn/; provisional designation 2002 CR_{46}) is a scattered disc object that was discovered on February 5, 2002, by the NEAT program. It measures 162±7 km in diameter and is named after Typhon, a monster in Greek mythology. Typhon is the first known binary centaur, under an extended definition of a centaur as an object on a non-resonant (unstable) orbit with the perihelion inside the orbit of Neptune.

== Symbol ==
Planetary symbols are no longer much used in astronomy, so Typhon never received a symbol in the astronomical literature. There is no standard symbol for Typhon used by astrologers either. A hurricane symbol has been used, which might be identified with U+1F300 🌀︎ CYCLONE (U+FE0E ︎ VARIATION SELECTOR-15 is used to make the character display as text).

== Physical properties ==
Measurements of its thermal radiation led to an equivalent diameter of about either 138±9 km or 185±7 km, with the latter value preferable. The diameter of the central body (Typhon) is in the latter case 162±7 km. Due to its small size, it is unlikely to be classified as a dwarf planet. As of 2021, no rotational lightcurve has been analyzed and the body's actual shape remain unknown.

Typhon has a BR taxonomic class, with a blue surface. It has a resulting B–R color difference of about 1.3, while V–I color difference is about unity. The spectra of Typhon show the presence of water ice and possibly of water altered silicates.

== Satellite ==
Echidna
Discovery
- Discovery date: 2006

Designations
- Pronunciation: /ɪˈkɪdnə/
- Named after: Έχιδνα
- Adjectives: Echidnian; Echidnean (rarely) (both /ɪˈkɪdniən/)

Orbital characteristics
- Semi-major axis: 1729±24 km
- Eccentricity: 0.53±0.01
- Orbital period (sidereal): 18.990+0.004 −0.003 days
- Inclination: 43.2°+1.2° −1.1°
- Satellite of: Typhon

Physical characteristics
- Dimensions: 89±6 km
- Mass: <0.14×10^{18} kg

A large moon was identified in 2006. It is named Echidna (formal designation (42355) Typhon I), after the monstrous mate of Typhon. It orbits Typhon at the distance of 1628±29 km, completing one orbit in 18.9709±0.0064 days. Its diameter is estimated at 89±6 km. Echidna has the same color as Typhon.

== See also ==
- Centaur (minor planet)
- Scattered disc
- Minor-planet moon
- List of trans-Neptunian objects
- Typhon (mythology)
