= 912 Maritima =

Asteroid in the asteroid belt

Discovery
- Discovered by: A. Schwassmann; Bergedorf
- Discovery date: 27 April 1919

Designations
- Pronunciation: /məˈrɪtɪmə/
- Minor planet category: Main belt

Orbital characteristics
- Epoch 31 July 2016 (JD 2457600.5)
- Uncertainty parameter 0
- Observation arc: 85.59 yr (31263 days)
- Aphelion: 3.6842 AU (551.15 Gm) (Q)
- Perihelion: 2.5842 AU (386.59 Gm) (q)
- Semi-major axis: 3.1342 AU (468.87 Gm) (a)
- Eccentricity: 0.17548 (e)
- Orbital period (sidereal): 5.55 yr (2026.7 d)
- Mean anomaly: 282.25° (M)
- Mean motion: 0° 10^{m} 39.468^{s} / day (n)
- Inclination: 18.344° (i)
- Longitude of ascending node: 34.032° (Ω)
- Argument of perihelion: 88.889° (ω)

Physical characteristics
- Mean radius: 41.585±1 km (IRAS)
- Synodic rotation period: 1,332 h (55.5 d)
- Geometric albedo: 0.1115±0.006
- Spectral type: C
- Apparent magnitude: 13.3 to 16.9
- Absolute magnitude (H): 9.3

912 Maritima is an asteroid in the asteroid belt. Based on lightcurve studies observing Maritima over a three-month period, Maritima has a rotation period of 1332 hours. Analysis reveals a possible synodic period of 1332±5 h. Superslow rotators, those with periods longer than a few days, are generally small asteroids. The current paradigm is that slowing of an asteroid's spin rate is the result of YORP radiation pressure, which acts on the target as the inverse square of its size and the inverse of its semi-major axis. The rotation period is less than conclusive.
