= (144897) 2004 UX10 =

Kuiper belt object

(144897) 2004 UX_{10}
Discovery
- Discovered by: A. C. Becker; A. W. Puckett; J. Kubica
- Discovery site: Apache Point Obs.
- Discovery date: 20 October 2004

Designations
- Minor planet category: TNO · cubewano

Orbital characteristics
- Epoch 27 April 2019 (JD 2458600.5)
- Uncertainty parameter 2
- Observation arc: 65.21 yr (23,818 days)
- Aphelion: 40.591 AU
- Perihelion: 37.152 AU
- Semi-major axis: 38.871 AU
- Eccentricity: 0.0442
- Orbital period (sidereal): 242.35 yr (88,520 days)
- Mean anomaly: 102.254°
- Mean motion: 0° 0^{m} 14.76^{s} / day
- Inclination: 9.5316°
- Longitude of ascending node: 147.90°
- Argument of perihelion: 149.15°
- Known satellites: 0

Physical characteristics
- Dimensions: 361+124 −94 km 398±39 km
- Mass: ≳3×10^{19} kg
- Mean density: > 1.21 g/cm^{3}
- Equatorial surface gravity: > 0.06 m/s^{2}
- Equatorial escape velocity: > 0.15 km/s
- Synodic rotation period: 7.58±0.05 h
- Geometric albedo: 0.141+0.044 −0.031
- Temperature: 44.6 K (perihelion)
- Spectral type: CO_{2}-type ("double-dip"); B–V =0.95±0.02; V–R = 0.58±0.05
- Apparent magnitude: 20.6
- Absolute magnitude (H): 4.75±0.16; 4.4

(144897) 2004 UX_{10} is a Kuiper-belt object. It has a diameter of about 360 kilometres (220 mi) and was discovered by Andrew Becker, Andrew Puckett and Jeremy Kubica on 20 October 2004 at Apache Point Observatory in Sunspot, New Mexico. The object is classified as a cubewano. It is near a 2:3 resonance with Neptune.

== Orbit and rotation ==
Based on an integration of its motion over 10 million years, 2004 UX_{10} has been classified as a classical Kuiper belt object (cubewano). The object is currently at 39 AU from the Sun.

The rotational period of 2004 UX_{10} is 7.58 hours.

== Physical properties ==
The size of 2004 UX_{10} was measured by the Herschel Space Telescope to be 361+124
−94 km. The mass of the object is currently unknown but should be greater than about 3×10^{19} kg.

2004 UX_{10} has a moderately red slope in the visible spectral range. Its visible spectrum does not show any features, although there is a small departure from the linearity near 0.8 μm.
