= (470599) 2008 OG19 =

Trans-Neptunian object

(470599) 2008 OG_{19}
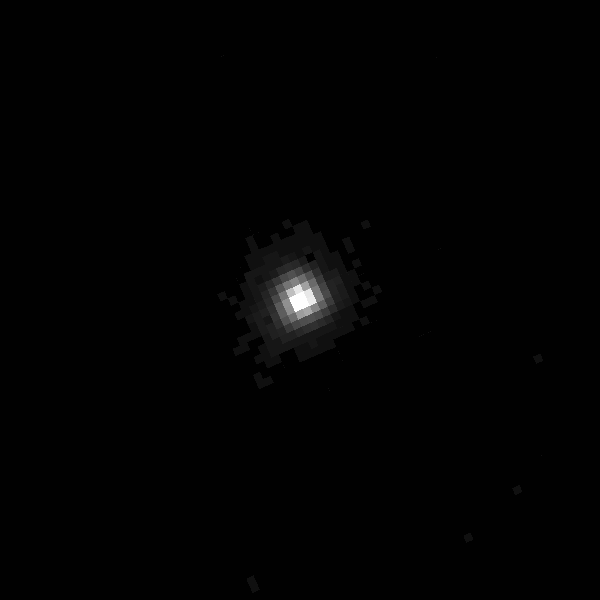
- 2008 OG_{19} photographed by the Hubble Space Telescope on 21 May 2026

Discovery
- Discovered by: Palomar Observatory team
- Discovery site: Palomar Observatory
- Discovery date: 30 July 2008 (first observation)

Designations
- Minor planet category: scattered disc

Orbital characteristics
- Epoch 13 January 2016 (JD 2457400.5)
- Uncertainty parameter 3 · 1(?)
- Observation arc: 2596 days (7.11 yr)
- Aphelion: 94.004 AU (14.0628 Tm)
- Perihelion: 38.576 AU (5.7709 Tm)
- Semi-major axis: 66.290 AU (9.9168 Tm)
- Eccentricity: 0.41807
- Orbital period (sidereal): 539.73 yr (197137 d)
- Mean anomaly: 1.5681°
- Mean motion: 0° 0^{m} 6.574^{s} /day
- Inclination: 13.167°
- Longitude of ascending node: 164.02°
- Argument of perihelion: 140.53°
- Known satellites: 0

Physical characteristics
- Dimensions: 619+56 −113 km (assuming albedo of 0.081); 394+57 −63 km (assuming albedo of 0.199)
- Mean density: 0.609±0.004 g/cm^{3} 0.544+0.042 −0.004 g/cm^{3} (minimum)
- Sidereal rotation period: 8.727±0.003 h
- Geometric albedo: 0.081 (assumed as typical SDO albedo); 0.199 (assumed)
- Spectral type: V–R=0.64
- Absolute magnitude (H): 4.39±0.07 (R-band); 4.83

(470599) 2008 OG_{19} is a trans-Neptunian object located in the scattered disc. It was discovered on 30 July 2008 through the Palomar Observatory. It displays a large light curve amplitude of 0.437±0.011 magnitudes, implying that it is highly elongated in shape, similar to 20000 Varuna. Based on models for its light curve amplitude, they obtained an approximate density of 0.609 g/cm^{3} and aspect ratios of b/a = 0.513 and c/a = 0.39.

The Hubble Space Telescope photographed 2008 OG_{19} on 21 May 2026, during a search for moons around large trans-Neptunian objects.

== Orbit and classification ==
2008 OG_{19} orbits the Sun at a distance of 38.6–94.0 AU once every 539.7 years (197,137 days). Its orbit has a moderate eccentricity of 0.418 and an inclination of 13.2° relative to the ecliptic.

The object is classified as a trans-Neptunian object, specifically a scattered disc object (SDO). While its perihelion (closest approach to the Sun) of 38.5 AU keeps it well outside the direct orbit of Neptune (which orbits at roughly 30 AU), its high eccentricity and semi-major axis of 66.2 AU are characteristic of bodies whose orbits were dynamically scattered by the ice giants into the outer reaches of the Solar System.

With an absolute magnitude of 4.8, it is considered a relatively large trans-Neptunian object, though it has not been observed to share any mean-motion resonances with Neptune.
