= 2013 YP139 =

Near-Earth asteroid in 2013

2013 YP_{139}
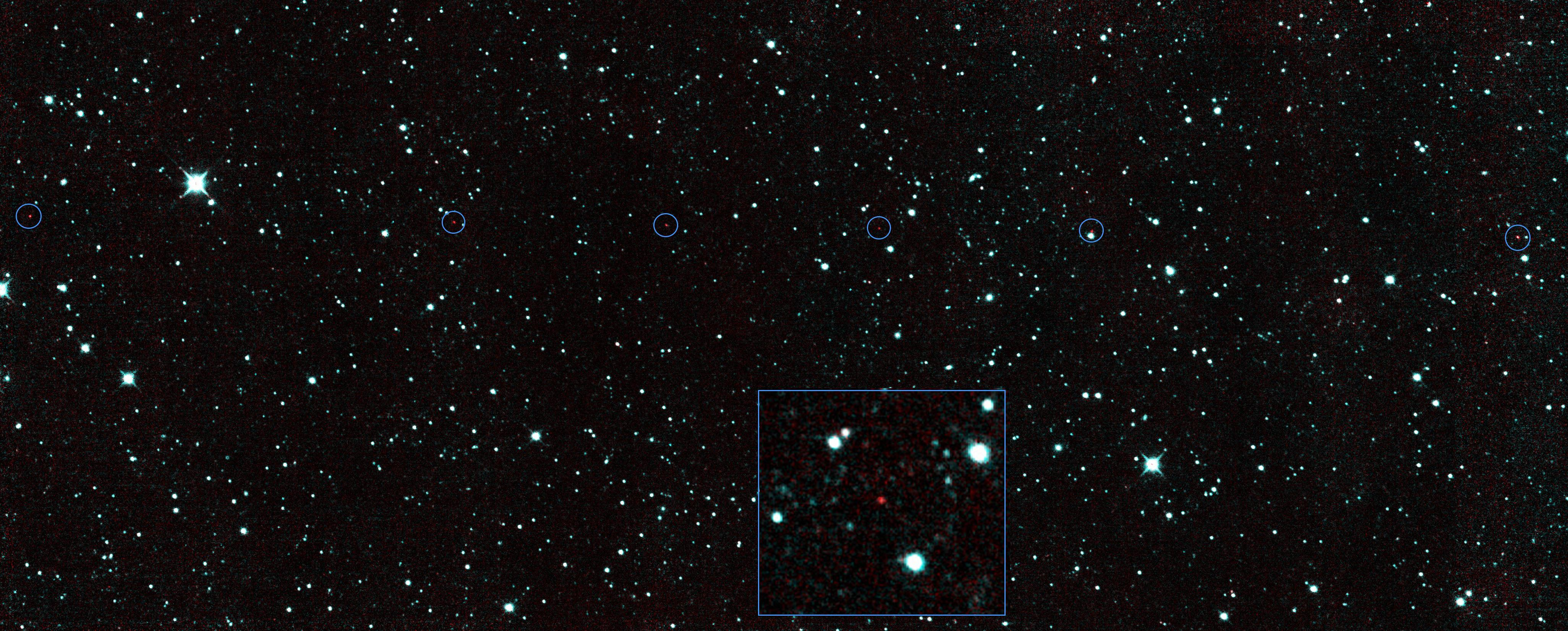
- Near-Earth asteroid 2013 YP_{139}—the six red dots in the composite image by NEOWISE specify the location of the asteroid. The inset is an enlargement of the image of 29 December 2013.

Discovery
- Discovered by: NEAT; NEOWISE
- Discovery site: Palomar Obs. Earth orbit
- Discovery date: 29 June 2002; 29 December 2013

Designations
- Alternative designations: 2002 MU_{7}
- Minor planet category: NEO · Apollo · PHA

Orbital characteristics
- Epoch 23 March 2018 (JD 2458200.5)
- Uncertainty parameter 0
- Observation arc: 11.58 yr (4,231 days)
- Aphelion: 4.0373 AU
- Perihelion: 0.7603 AU
- Semi-major axis: 2.3988 AU
- Eccentricity: 0.6831
- Orbital period (sidereal): 3.72 yr (1,357 days)
- Mean anomaly: 61.262°
- Mean motion: 0° 15^{m} 55.08^{s} / day
- Inclination: 0.8171°
- Longitude of ascending node: 292.13°
- Argument of perihelion: 83.598°
- Earth MOID: 0.0040 AU (1.56 LD)

Physical characteristics
- Mean diameter: 0.402±0.026 km 0.650 km
- Geometric albedo: 0.025±0.006
- Absolute magnitude (H): 21.6

2013 YP_{139} is a dark sub-kilometer asteroid on a highly eccentric orbit, classified as a near-Earth object and potentially hazardous asteroid of the Apollo group, approximately 400 meters (1,300 feet) in diameter.

It was first observed as 2002 MU_{7} by NEAT at Palomar Observatory on 29 June 2002, and by the WISE space telescope on 29 December 2013, under its current, principal provisional designation. This object was the first possible discovery of the reinstated NEOWISE program of the WISE telescope, following the program's hibernation in 2011.

== Orbit and classification ==
2013 YP_{139} belongs to the Apollo asteroids, which cross the orbit of Earth. They are the largest group of near-Earth objects with nearly 10 thousand known members.

This object orbits the Sun at a distance of 0.76–4.0 AU once every 3 years and 8.6 months (1,357 days; semi-major axis of 2.40 AU). Its orbit has an eccentricity of 0.68 and an inclination of 1° with respect to the ecliptic. Due to this close proximity, NASA has classified this object as a potential threat. At the time of the first WISE observations, this object was moving at a rate of 3.2° per day (for comparison the apparent diameter of the Moon is 0.5°).

=== Close approaches ===
2013 YP_{139} has a minimum orbital intersection distance with Earth of 0.00397 AU (594,000 km; 369,000 mi), which corresponds to 1.6 lunar distances (LD). In August 2002 and December 2013, approached Earth at 4.1 LD and 94 LD, respectively. On 12 December 2069, it will pass Earth at a nominal distance of 0.007911 AU (1,180,000 km; 735,000 mi), or nearly 3 LD. It also makes close approaches to Jupiter, Venus, Mars and the Moon.

== First WISE observations ==
The Wide-field Infrared Survey Explorer's Near-Earth Object WISE (NEOWISE) program was put into hibernation on 1 February 2011, following several program extensions, from which approximately 34,000 asteroids were detected. On 21 August 2013, however, the program was reactivated. The new mission of the NEOWISE was to identify the population of potentially hazardous near-Earth objects.

2013 YP_{139} was first observed on 29 December 2013, at a distance of 0.235 astronomical units (35,200,000 kilometres; 21,800,000 miles) from Earth, marking the first object detected since the program's reinstatement. The infrared brightness was the primary attribute used for ascertaining the approximate size of the asteroid. Over the course of half a day, the trajectory of the asteroid was observed against the stationary positioning of the stars in the background.

The data from the Wide-field Infrared Survey Explorer was transmitted to the Infrared Processing and Analysis Center at the California Institute of Technology, located in Pasadena, California. To confirm the discovery, researchers at the University of Arizona utilized the Spacewatch telescope at the Kitt Peak National Observatory in Tucson, Arizona. 2013 YP_{139} is considered by NASA to be the first in what is expected to be thousands of objects to be detected by NEOWISE's new mission. Due to the trajectory of the asteroid, which puts it within a potentially dangerous range in over one hundred years following its discovery, NASA stated that they would keep a watchful eye on it.

== Physical characteristics ==
According to the survey carried out by the NEOWISE mission of NASA's Wide-field Infrared Survey Explorer, 2013 YP_{139} measures 0.402 kilometers in diameter and its surface has an exceptionally low albedo of 0.025. Estimates from 2014 gave a somewhat larger diameter of 0.650 kilometers (0.404 miles). Its very dark surface has an albedo comparable to a piece of coal.

== See also ==
- List of asteroid close approaches to Earth in 2013
