= (172034) 2001 WR1 =

Near-Earth asteroid

(172034) 2001 WR_{1}
Discovery
- Discovered by: LINEAR
- Discovery site: Lincoln Lab's ETS
- Discovery date: 17 November 2001

Designations
- Minor planet category: NEO · Amor

Orbital characteristics
- Epoch 1 July 2021 (JD 2459396.5)
- Uncertainty parameter 0
- Observation arc: 68.26 yr (24,933 d)
- Aphelion: 1.5359 AU
- Perihelion: 1.0185 AU
- Semi-major axis: 1.2772 AU
- Eccentricity: 0.2025
- Orbital period (sidereal): 1.44 yr (527 d)
- Mean anomaly: 200.68°
- Mean motion: 0° 40^{m} 58.08^{s} / day
- Inclination: 25.030°
- Longitude of ascending node: 6.5141°
- Argument of perihelion: 48.551°
- Earth MOID: 0.0752 AU (29.3 LD)

Physical characteristics
- Mean diameter: 0.631±0.018 km; 0.66±0.17 km
- Synodic rotation period: 8.0475±0.0003 h (Note: Lightcurve plot of (172034) 2001 WR1 from Feb/Mar 2018 by Brian D. Warner at the Palmer Divide Observatory (U82). Rotation period 8.0475±0.0003 hours with a brightness amplitude of 0.95±0.03 mag. Quality code is 3. Summary figures at the CS3 and LCDB websites.)
- Geometric albedo: 0.34
- Spectral type: S
- Absolute magnitude (H): 17.76

(172034) 2001 WR_{1} is a sub-kilometer near-Earth object of the Amor group, approximately 650 meters (2,100 feet) in diameter. The S-type asteroid has been identified as a potential flyby target of the Hayabusa2 mission. It was discovered on 17 November 2001, by astronomers with the Lincoln Near-Earth Asteroid Research at the Lincoln Laboratory's Experimental Test Site near Socorro, New Mexico, in the United States. The asteroid has a rotation period of 8.0 hours and possibly an elongated shape. It remains unnamed since its numbering in December 2007.

== Numbering and naming ==
This minor planet was numbered by the Minor Planet Center on 24 December 2007 (M.P.C. 61443). As of 2021, it has not been named.

== Orbit and classification ==
Animated orbital diagram for 2001 WR_{1} from 1 January 2020 to 31 December 2023 2001 WR_{1} · Earth · Mars · Sun

2001 WR_{1} is an Amor asteroid – a subgroup of near-Earth asteroids that approach the orbit of Earth from beyond, but do not cross it. The object orbits the Sun at an average distance – its semi-major axis – of 1.28 astronomical units (AU). Throughout its 1.44 year (527 d) orbit, its distance from the Sun varies from 1.02 AU at perihelion to 1.54 AU at aphelion. Its orbit has an eccentricity of 0.20 and an inclination of 25° with respect to the ecliptic plane. Its observation arc begins with its first observation in February 1953, more than 48 years prior to its official discovery observation at Socorro. The precovery was taken at Palomar Observatory and published by the Digitized Sky Survey.

=== Close encounters ===
2001 WR_{1} has an Earth minimum orbital intersection distance of 0.0747 AU (11,200,000 km) which corresponds to 29.1 lunar distances. In September 1926, it approached Earth to 0.1496 AU (22,400,000 km), its closest approach of all close encounters since 1900. Only in September 2199, it will approach Earth at a similar distance of 0.1514 AU (22,600,000 km).

== Physical characteristics ==
2001 WR_{1} has been characterized as a common, stony S-type asteroid.

=== Rotation period ===
In March 2018, a rotational lightcurve of 2001 WR_{1} was obtained from photometric observations by Brian Warner at the Palmer Divide Station (U82) in California. Analysis of its lightcurve gave a rotation period of 8.0475±0.0003 hours with a brightness amplitude of 0.95 magnitude (U=3), indicative of a non-spherical shape.

=== Diameter and albedo ===
According to the survey carried out by the NEOWISE mission of NASA's Wide-field Infrared Survey Explorer, 2001 WR_{1} has an albedo of 0.34 and measures 0.63 and 0.66 kilometers in diameter, respectively. The Collaborative Asteroid Lightcurve Link assumes a standard albedo for a stony asteroid of 0.20 and calculates a diameter of 0.818 kilometers based on an absolute magnitude of 17.8.

== Exploration ==
2001 WR_{1} was proposed as a target of the Hayabusa2 extended mission for a flyby planned to occur on 27 June 2023. When the spacecraft returned to Earth and delivered the sample capsule in December 2020, it was expected to retain 30 kg of xenon propellant, which can be used to extend its service and flyby new targets to explore. However, this asteroid was not selected as a target for Hayabusa2; two other asteroids were selected instead.
