= Trans-Neptunian spectral types =

Classification type of a class of astronomical objects

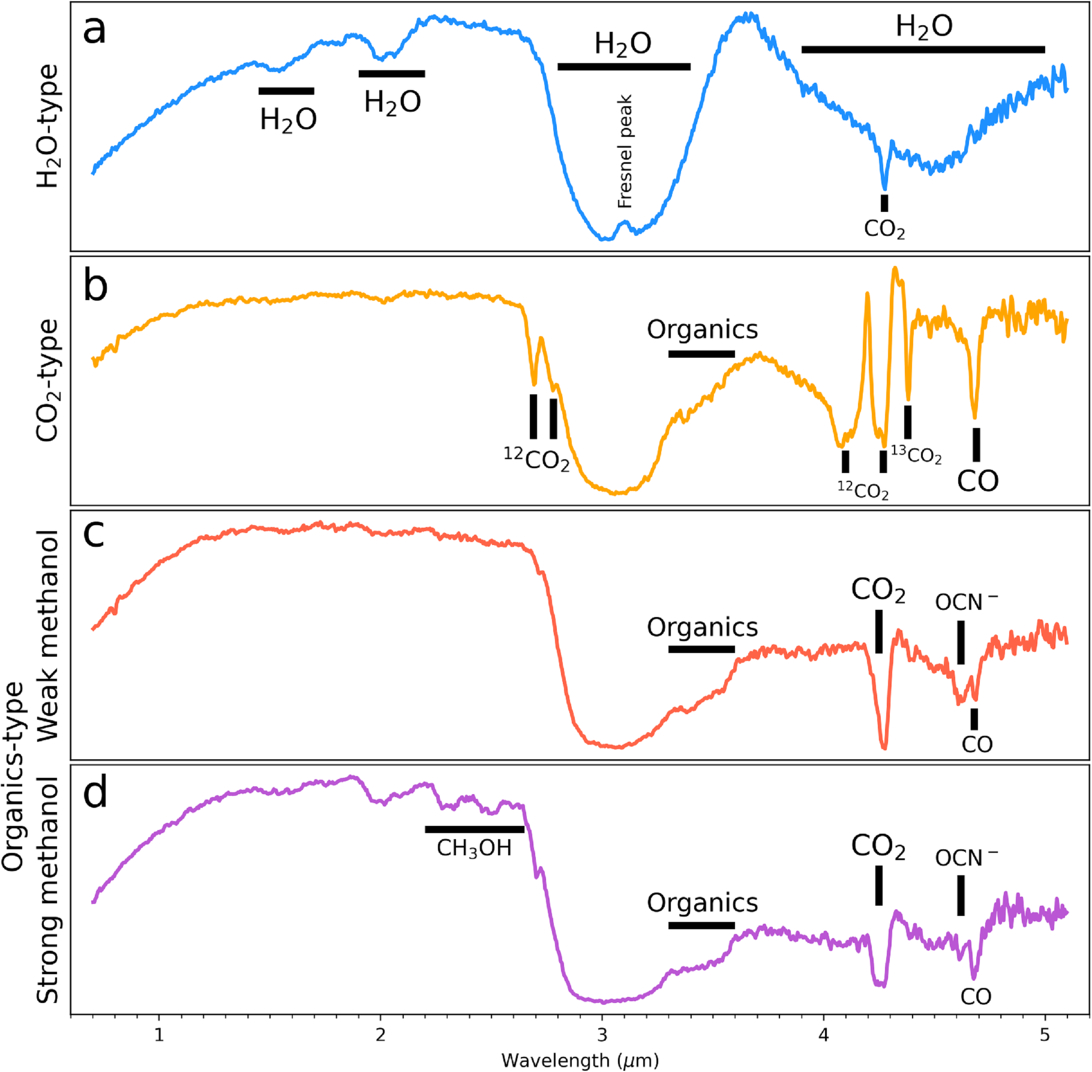
Near-infrared spectra of the four most common spectral types of trans-Neptunian objects (TNOs) in the Solar System.

A trans-Neptunian spectral type (or Kuiper belt spectral type) is assigned to trans-Neptunian objects (TNOs) and other icy small bodies in the Solar System based on their reflectance spectrum (and in some cases, albedo). Spectral types are useful as they provide a first-order description of the surface composition of these distant objects.

== History ==
In 2025, the James Webb Space Telescope (JWST) enabled, for the first time, a compositional classification of TNOs using infrared (IR) spectroscopy. This was possible thanks to the unprecedented sensitivity of Webb in the 2–5 μm range, where ices and complex hydrocarbons exhibit diagnostic absorption bands. By applying three independent clustering techniques to a large sample of TNOs, the DiSCo (Discovering the Surface Composition of TNOs) program identified three distinct groups with different spectral features.

These compositional classes reflect primarily the primordial makeup of the planetesimal disk where TNOs formed, rather than evolutionary processes, although irradiation and volatile loss have left secondary imprints. Thus, this spectral classification provides a direct link between the current Kuiper belt and the initial conditions of the Solar System.

== DiSCo-Webb compositional types ==
The Discovering the Surface Composition of TNOs (DiSCo) program observed 54 TNOs and 5 centaurs with the NIRSpec/Prism mode on JWST. These spectra cover the 0.7–5.3 μm wavelength range with a spectral resolution of 30–300. This large program applied three independent clustering methods—k-means, hierarchical clustering, and Gaussian mixture modeling–and all consistently identified the same three compositional classes.

Although spectral differences are present across the full wavelength range, the classification was named according to the distinctive shape of the 3 μm region, which is the most diagnostic for a non-expert observer.

=== Spectrally prominent water (H_{2}O-type) ===
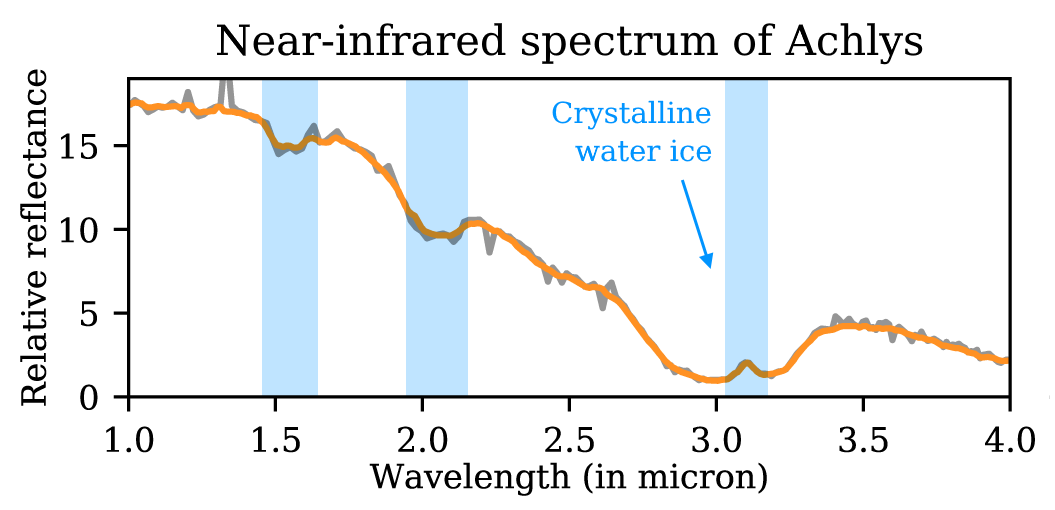
The plutino 208996 Achlys is an example of a H_{2}O-type TNO. Its near-infrared spectrum displays the characteristic bowl-shaped absorption feature at 3 μm, alongside a Fresnel peak at 3.1 μm due to the presence of crystalline water ice on its surface.

H_{2}O-type TNOs (25% of the DiSCo sample) display a broad, concave absorption feature centered near 3 μm, resembling the shape of a bowl. For this reason, H_{2}O-type TNOs were initially known as "bowl-type" TNOs. As the name suggests, the surfaces of H_{2}O-type TNOs are dominated by H_{2}O ice mixed with dark material (likely silicate-rich dust). This class shows water-ice absorption bands at 1.5, 1.65, 2.02, 3.0, 4.5 μm and a Fresnel peak at 3.1 μm, suggesting prevalence of the crystalline phase of water ice on the surface of TNOs. This class shows weak signatures of other ices such as CO_{2}. They are interpreted as objects that formed in the inner regions of the primordial planetesimal disk, where water ice was the dominant condensable volatile. The H_{2}O-types exist along all the size range of the DiSCo sample and display the less red and darker surfaces in the visible wavelengths. H_{2}O-types can also be explained as "Dicy" surfaces, because of the mixture of dust and ice, as models of H_{2}O-type centaurs show.

=== Spectrally prominent carbon oxides (CO_{2}-type) ===
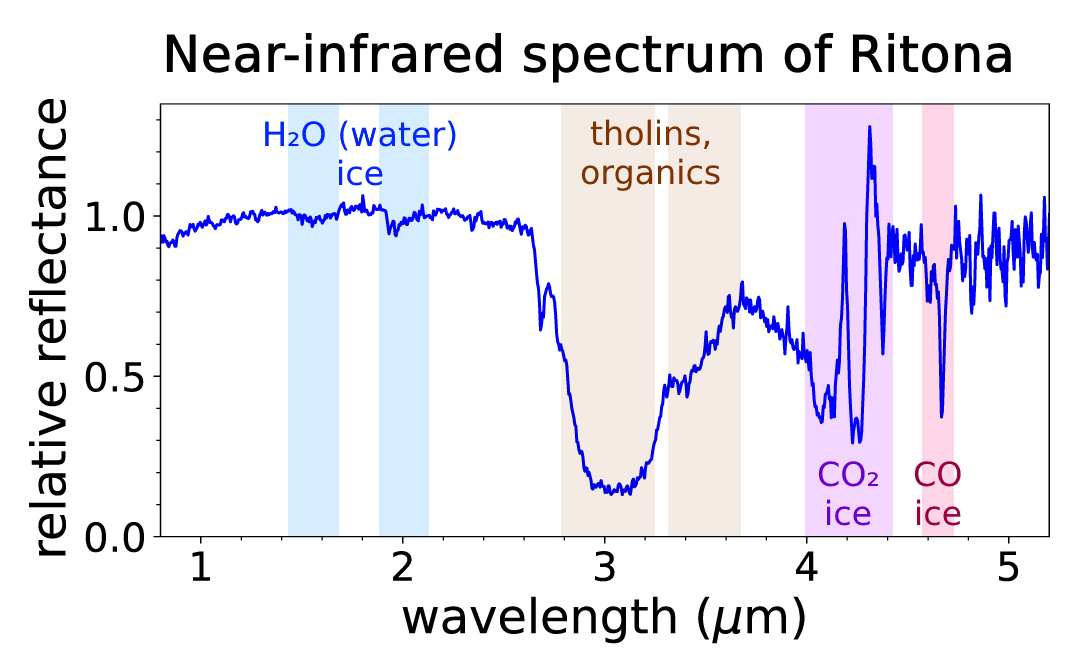
The hot classical Kuiper belt object 145452 Ritona is an example of a CO_{2}-type TNO. Its near-infrared spectrum displays the characteristic "double-dip" at around 3 μm, alongside prominent absorption dips between 4 and 5 μm due to abundant CO_{2} and CO in its surface.

The CO_{2}-type TNOs exhibit two adjacent absorption minima in the 3 μm region, giving the appearance of a "double-dip" feature. As such, CO_{2}-type TNOs were initially known as "double-dip" TNOs. Their spectra reveal a clear dominance of carbon dioxide (CO_{2}), its heavier isotopologue (^{13}CO_{2}), and carbon monoxide (CO) ices, along with irradiation products such as light hydrocarbons. These surfaces point to formation at intermediate distances in the disk, where CO_{2} was stable and incorporated in large quantities. CO shows up as a by-product of irradiation of CO_{2}. The CO_{2}-type is the most abundant spectral type in the DiSco sample (43%), and displays the lowest spectral dispersion in the sub-group. All the dynamically detached TNOs are CO_{2}-type.

=== Spectrally prominent organics (organics-type) ===
The spectra of organics-type TNOs (32% of the DiSCo sample) are characterized by a steep drop ("cliff") in reflectance shortward of 3 μm, followed by strong absorptions consistent with methanol (CH_{3}OH) and complex organics, including -NH bearing materials. The organics-type TNOs were previously known as "cliff" TNOs. They show the reddest spectral slopes in the visible spectrum, consistent with abundant irradiated hydrocarbons. These surfaces are the most diverse in the sample and group into two sub-classes: "strong methanol" ("Cliff-1") and "weak methanol" ("Cliff-2"). The region between 1.2 and 2.6 μm is especially diagnostic. The strong methanol organics-type displays multiple absorption bands of CH_{3}OH and complex organics with -OH, -CH, and -NH groups, as well as CO_{2}, CO, and possibly residual H_{2}O produced by irradiation of methanol and CO_{2}. The weak methanol organics-type, in contrast, shows fewer ices, lacking absorptions in the 2.2–2.6 μm region but it shows broad absorptions in the longer wavelengths attributed to materials containing nitriles (C-N or C≡N). All the cold classical Kuiper belt objects are classified under the weak methanol organics-type. These differences suggest formation farther out in the disk, in regions rich in methanol and complex carbon chemistry. The existence of such subgroups indicates that spectral diversity among TNOs is not only shaped by later evolutionary processes (irradiation, volatile loss), but also reflects primordial heterogeneities in the outer solar nebula.

=== Shallow type ===
Additionally, a fourth type was defined when studying the centaur population, the "Shallow-type" spectra. They are characterized by a simple but very weak absorption around 3 μm, resembling the H_{2}O-type TNOs but with much shallower depth. However, their spectra differ markedly from the median H_{2}O-type TNO spectrum: not only the 3 μm band is shallower, the H_{2}O ice bands at 1.5, 2.0, and 4.5 μm and the 3.1 μm Fresnel peak are weak, and the CO_{2} fundamental band is faint (<10%). This class is absent among TNOs, suggesting that it may arise from evolutionary effects linked to thermal processing and the development of a surface dust mantle. Remarkably, the spectra of Jupiter trojans bear strong similarities to the Shallow-type, showing a reddish continuum from 0.9 to 5.4 μm combined with a broad, shallow absorption near 3 μm.
