= List of minor planets: 452001–453000 =

The following is a partial list of minor planets, running from minor-planet number 452001 through 453000, inclusive. The primary data for this and other partial lists is based on JPL's "Small-Body Orbital Elements" and data available from the Minor Planet Center. Critical list information is also provided by the MPC, unless otherwise specified from Lowell Observatory. A detailed description of the table's columns and additional sources are given on the main page including a complete list of every page in this series, and a statistical break-up on the dynamical classification of minor planets.

Also see the summary list of all named bodies in numerical and alphabetical order, and the corresponding naming citations for the number range of this particular list. New namings may only be added to this list after official publication, as the preannouncement of names is condemned by the Working Group for Small Bodies Nomenclature of the International Astronomical Union.

Near-Earth obj.	MBA (inner)	MBA (outer)	Centaur
Mars-crosser	MBA (middle)	Jupiter trojan	Trans-Neptunian obj.
Unclassified

== 452001–452100 ==
Designation			Discovery			Properties		Ref
Permanent	Provisional	Named after	Date	Site	Discoverer(s)	Category	Diam.	Ref
452001	2014 OP_{46}	—	November 3, 2004	Kitt Peak	Spacewatch	THM	1.9 km	MPC · JPL
452002	2014 OG_{48}	—	November 27, 2010	Mount Lemmon	Mount Lemmon Survey	·	1.5 km	MPC · JPL
452003	2014 OR_{48}	—	September 12, 2004	Kitt Peak	Spacewatch	·	1.8 km	MPC · JPL
452004	2014 OA_{54}	—	October 28, 2010	Mount Lemmon	Mount Lemmon Survey	·	1.9 km	MPC · JPL
452005	2014 OL_{54}	—	November 2, 2010	Mount Lemmon	Mount Lemmon Survey	KOR	1.2 km	MPC · JPL
452006	2014 OX_{57}	—	May 10, 2005	Mount Lemmon	Mount Lemmon Survey	·	1.3 km	MPC · JPL
452007	2014 OB_{67}	—	January 5, 2000	Kitt Peak	Spacewatch	·	3.4 km	MPC · JPL
452008	2014 OU_{87}	—	September 27, 2006	Mount Lemmon	Mount Lemmon Survey	·	1.7 km	MPC · JPL
452009	2014 OO_{88}	—	April 3, 2008	Kitt Peak	Spacewatch	·	1.9 km	MPC · JPL
452010	2014 OO_{90}	—	December 27, 2006	Mount Lemmon	Mount Lemmon Survey	DOR	1.6 km	MPC · JPL
452011	2014 OT_{92}	—	October 18, 2006	Kitt Peak	Spacewatch	·	2.0 km	MPC · JPL
452012	2014 OC_{93}	—	July 29, 2009	Kitt Peak	Spacewatch	CYB	3.1 km	MPC · JPL
452013	2014 OA_{97}	—	September 18, 2010	Mount Lemmon	Mount Lemmon Survey	·	1.8 km	MPC · JPL
452014	2014 OJ_{104}	—	August 25, 2004	Kitt Peak	Spacewatch	EOS	1.5 km	MPC · JPL
452015	2014 OO_{114}	—	October 17, 1995	Kitt Peak	Spacewatch	KOR	1.2 km	MPC · JPL
452016	2014 OX_{114}	—	January 20, 2012	Mount Lemmon	Mount Lemmon Survey	HOF	1.9 km	MPC · JPL
452017	2014 OO_{117}	—	March 31, 2008	Kitt Peak	Spacewatch	KOR	1.3 km	MPC · JPL
452018	2014 OJ_{119}	—	September 11, 2004	Kitt Peak	Spacewatch	·	1.6 km	MPC · JPL
452019	2014 OU_{119}	—	January 9, 2011	Kitt Peak	Spacewatch	·	2.8 km	MPC · JPL
452020	2014 OG_{120}	—	February 26, 2008	Mount Lemmon	Mount Lemmon Survey	·	1.6 km	MPC · JPL
452021	2014 OL_{122}	—	July 5, 2005	Kitt Peak	Spacewatch	·	1.9 km	MPC · JPL
452022	2014 OD_{124}	—	September 19, 2010	Kitt Peak	Spacewatch	HOF	2.1 km	MPC · JPL
452023	2014 OG_{125}	—	November 24, 2011	Mount Lemmon	Mount Lemmon Survey	AGN	1.1 km	MPC · JPL
452024	2014 OY_{125}	—	November 10, 2010	Mount Lemmon	Mount Lemmon Survey	·	1.4 km	MPC · JPL
452025	2014 OS_{135}	—	March 17, 2013	Kitt Peak	Spacewatch	·	2.0 km	MPC · JPL
452026	2014 OA_{138}	—	November 23, 2006	Kitt Peak	Spacewatch	·	1.7 km	MPC · JPL
452027	2014 OE_{141}	—	May 22, 2003	Kitt Peak	Spacewatch	·	2.1 km	MPC · JPL
452028	2014 OD_{151}	—	September 30, 2006	Mount Lemmon	Mount Lemmon Survey	·	1.5 km	MPC · JPL
452029	2014 OC_{152}	—	February 21, 2007	Mount Lemmon	Mount Lemmon Survey	EOS	1.8 km	MPC · JPL
452030	2014 OP_{154}	—	July 7, 2010	WISE	WISE	HOF	2.5 km	MPC · JPL
452031	2014 OL_{155}	—	September 26, 2009	Mount Lemmon	Mount Lemmon Survey	·	3.3 km	MPC · JPL
452032	2014 OO_{165}	—	March 12, 2007	Mount Lemmon	Mount Lemmon Survey	·	2.1 km	MPC · JPL
452033	2014 OQ_{165}	—	October 7, 2004	Socorro	LINEAR	·	2.1 km	MPC · JPL
452034	2014 OD_{166}	—	July 22, 2006	Mount Lemmon	Mount Lemmon Survey	·	1.4 km	MPC · JPL
452035	2014 OQ_{166}	—	November 8, 2010	Mount Lemmon	Mount Lemmon Survey	·	1.6 km	MPC · JPL
452036	2014 OC_{167}	—	September 24, 2006	Kitt Peak	Spacewatch	·	1.4 km	MPC · JPL
452037	2014 OW_{167}	—	September 22, 2009	Mount Lemmon	Mount Lemmon Survey	·	2.7 km	MPC · JPL
452038	2014 OM_{169}	—	September 23, 2009	Kitt Peak	Spacewatch	VER	2.7 km	MPC · JPL
452039	2014 OB_{178}	—	September 17, 2009	Mount Lemmon	Mount Lemmon Survey	·	3.1 km	MPC · JPL
452040	2014 OF_{179}	—	December 6, 2010	Kitt Peak	Spacewatch	·	4.2 km	MPC · JPL
452041	2014 OG_{181}	—	July 9, 2010	WISE	WISE	ADE	2.8 km	MPC · JPL
452042	2014 OG_{199}	—	December 19, 2004	Mount Lemmon	Mount Lemmon Survey	·	1.6 km	MPC · JPL
452043	2014 OQ_{202}	—	February 6, 2008	Catalina	CSS	·	3.7 km	MPC · JPL
452044	2014 OX_{209}	—	March 12, 2007	Mount Lemmon	Mount Lemmon Survey	·	1.9 km	MPC · JPL
452045	2014 OT_{216}	—	December 31, 2011	Kitt Peak	Spacewatch	HOF	2.1 km	MPC · JPL
452046	2014 OY_{239}	—	March 28, 2008	Kitt Peak	Spacewatch	KOR	1.0 km	MPC · JPL
452047	2014 OD_{240}	—	August 15, 2009	Kitt Peak	Spacewatch	·	1.5 km	MPC · JPL
452048	2014 OF_{240}	—	March 16, 2007	Mount Lemmon	Mount Lemmon Survey	THM	2.2 km	MPC · JPL
452049	2014 OC_{243}	—	November 26, 2005	Mount Lemmon	Mount Lemmon Survey	·	1.8 km	MPC · JPL
452050	2014 OL_{243}	—	October 8, 2007	Mount Lemmon	Mount Lemmon Survey	·	1.2 km	MPC · JPL
452051	2014 OA_{246}	—	January 31, 2009	Kitt Peak	Spacewatch	·	2.1 km	MPC · JPL
452052	2014 OA_{253}	—	August 27, 2009	Kitt Peak	Spacewatch	·	3.3 km	MPC · JPL
452053	2014 OP_{253}	—	March 25, 2008	Kitt Peak	Spacewatch	AGN	1.1 km	MPC · JPL
452054	2014 OG_{274}	—	October 16, 2009	Mount Lemmon	Mount Lemmon Survey	VER	2.3 km	MPC · JPL
452055	2014 ON_{274}	—	December 29, 2005	Kitt Peak	Spacewatch	·	3.3 km	MPC · JPL
452056	2014 OZ_{280}	—	April 5, 2008	Mount Lemmon	Mount Lemmon Survey	·	2.2 km	MPC · JPL
452057	2014 OB_{286}	—	October 9, 2004	Kitt Peak	Spacewatch	EOS	1.9 km	MPC · JPL
452058	2014 OW_{301}	—	September 30, 2010	Mount Lemmon	Mount Lemmon Survey	HOF	2.0 km	MPC · JPL
452059	2014 OW_{303}	—	February 9, 2008	Mount Lemmon	Mount Lemmon Survey	·	1.4 km	MPC · JPL
452060	2014 OV_{304}	—	September 30, 2010	Mount Lemmon	Mount Lemmon Survey	KOR	1.2 km	MPC · JPL
452061	2014 OU_{305}	—	October 11, 2004	Kitt Peak	Spacewatch	THM	1.9 km	MPC · JPL
452062	2014 OY_{308}	—	July 9, 2005	Kitt Peak	Spacewatch	·	1.8 km	MPC · JPL
452063	2014 ON_{310}	—	January 18, 2013	Kitt Peak	Spacewatch	·	1.2 km	MPC · JPL
452064	2014 OE_{311}	—	October 18, 2006	Kitt Peak	Spacewatch	·	1.4 km	MPC · JPL
452065	2014 OC_{313}	—	October 11, 2005	Kitt Peak	Spacewatch	KOR	1.1 km	MPC · JPL
452066	2014 OP_{324}	—	November 19, 2006	Catalina	CSS	·	1.6 km	MPC · JPL
452067	2014 OY_{330}	—	March 1, 2008	Kitt Peak	Spacewatch	·	1.5 km	MPC · JPL
452068	2014 OE_{333}	—	February 23, 2007	Mount Lemmon	Mount Lemmon Survey	·	1.6 km	MPC · JPL
452069	2014 OD_{334}	—	May 8, 2008	Mount Lemmon	Mount Lemmon Survey	EOS	2.0 km	MPC · JPL
452070	2014 OR_{340}	—	September 10, 2004	Kitt Peak	Spacewatch	·	1.8 km	MPC · JPL
452071	2014 OE_{351}	—	October 3, 2005	Kitt Peak	Spacewatch	·	1.7 km	MPC · JPL
452072	2014 ON_{353}	—	December 2, 2005	Kitt Peak	Spacewatch	EOS	1.6 km	MPC · JPL
452073	2014 OS_{353}	—	October 29, 2010	Mount Lemmon	Mount Lemmon Survey	·	2.7 km	MPC · JPL
452074	2014 OQ_{358}	—	January 30, 2006	Kitt Peak	Spacewatch	·	2.8 km	MPC · JPL
452075	2014 OW_{365}	—	October 3, 2008	Mount Lemmon	Mount Lemmon Survey	CYB	3.4 km	MPC · JPL
452076	2014 OQ_{377}	—	September 29, 2005	Mount Lemmon	Mount Lemmon Survey	KOR	1.3 km	MPC · JPL
452077	2014 OR_{380}	—	May 6, 2002	Kitt Peak	Spacewatch	VER	2.9 km	MPC · JPL
452078	2014 OG_{382}	—	April 8, 2013	Mount Lemmon	Mount Lemmon Survey	THM	2.0 km	MPC · JPL
452079	2014 OC_{385}	—	December 17, 2007	Mount Lemmon	Mount Lemmon Survey	·	2.0 km	MPC · JPL
452080	2014 OJ_{386}	—	September 4, 2010	Mount Lemmon	Mount Lemmon Survey	·	1.8 km	MPC · JPL
452081	2014 PC_{2}	—	February 17, 2007	Mount Lemmon	Mount Lemmon Survey	·	2.6 km	MPC · JPL
452082	2014 PR_{5}	—	September 11, 2004	Kitt Peak	Spacewatch	·	1.9 km	MPC · JPL
452083	2014 PL_{6}	—	June 16, 2009	Mount Lemmon	Mount Lemmon Survey	EOS	2.2 km	MPC · JPL
452084	2014 PH_{18}	—	March 24, 2012	Mount Lemmon	Mount Lemmon Survey	·	2.8 km	MPC · JPL
452085	2014 PG_{19}	—	January 23, 2006	Kitt Peak	Spacewatch	·	2.6 km	MPC · JPL
452086	2014 PK_{30}	—	September 12, 2007	Catalina	CSS	·	980 m	MPC · JPL
452087	2014 PO_{32}	—	April 11, 2013	Mount Lemmon	Mount Lemmon Survey	·	2.7 km	MPC · JPL
452088	2014 PZ_{33}	—	November 14, 2001	Kitt Peak	Spacewatch	AGN	1.4 km	MPC · JPL
452089	2014 PA_{45}	—	February 26, 2008	Mount Lemmon	Mount Lemmon Survey	MRX	1.1 km	MPC · JPL
452090	2014 PD_{55}	—	May 2, 2013	Mount Lemmon	Mount Lemmon Survey	·	2.6 km	MPC · JPL
452091	2014 QV_{31}	—	December 17, 2009	Mount Lemmon	Mount Lemmon Survey	·	4.1 km	MPC · JPL
452092	2014 QA_{34}	—	March 10, 2008	Mount Lemmon	Mount Lemmon Survey	·	1.7 km	MPC · JPL
452093	2014 QL_{34}	—	January 9, 2010	Kitt Peak	Spacewatch	·	3.0 km	MPC · JPL
452094	2014 QH_{35}	—	January 2, 2011	Mount Lemmon	Mount Lemmon Survey	·	3.0 km	MPC · JPL
452095	2014 QM_{35}	—	June 24, 2014	Kitt Peak	Spacewatch	·	2.6 km	MPC · JPL
452096	2014 QN_{35}	—	February 1, 2012	Kitt Peak	Spacewatch	·	2.5 km	MPC · JPL
452097	2014 QB_{36}	—	September 15, 2010	Kitt Peak	Spacewatch	WIT	880 m	MPC · JPL
452098	2014 QW_{50}	—	August 18, 2009	Kitt Peak	Spacewatch	EOS	1.7 km	MPC · JPL
452099	2014 QJ_{83}	—	June 24, 1995	Kitt Peak	Spacewatch	·	2.4 km	MPC · JPL
452100	2014 QD_{99}	—	February 16, 2007	Mount Lemmon	Mount Lemmon Survey	·	2.2 km	MPC · JPL

== 452101–452200 ==
back to top

Designation			Discovery			Properties		Ref
Permanent	Provisional	Named after	Date	Site	Discoverer(s)	Category	Diam.	Ref
452101	2014 QD_{161}	—	February 25, 2007	Mount Lemmon	Mount Lemmon Survey	·	3.9 km	MPC · JPL
452102	2014 QS_{185}	—	April 11, 2008	Mount Lemmon	Mount Lemmon Survey	·	2.3 km	MPC · JPL
452103	2014 QV_{202}	—	April 22, 2007	Mount Lemmon	Mount Lemmon Survey	·	2.9 km	MPC · JPL
452104	2014 QB_{269}	—	September 17, 2009	Mount Lemmon	Mount Lemmon Survey	EOS	2.3 km	MPC · JPL
452105	2014 QM_{283}	—	December 12, 2004	Kitt Peak	Spacewatch	·	2.8 km	MPC · JPL
452106	2014 QV_{283}	—	November 3, 2010	Kitt Peak	Spacewatch	·	3.3 km	MPC · JPL
452107	2014 QN_{284}	—	April 22, 2007	Mount Lemmon	Mount Lemmon Survey	·	2.8 km	MPC · JPL
452108	2014 QZ_{309}	—	March 26, 2007	Mount Lemmon	Mount Lemmon Survey	·	3.1 km	MPC · JPL
452109	2014 QS_{342}	—	February 1, 2012	Kitt Peak	Spacewatch	·	2.5 km	MPC · JPL
452110	2014 QC_{372}	—	March 18, 2001	Kitt Peak	Spacewatch	EOS	2.2 km	MPC · JPL
452111	2014 QY_{395}	—	September 11, 2005	Kitt Peak	Spacewatch	·	1.9 km	MPC · JPL
452112	2014 QD_{400}	—	March 25, 2007	Mount Lemmon	Mount Lemmon Survey	EOS	2.3 km	MPC · JPL
452113	2014 QX_{412}	—	January 30, 2006	Kitt Peak	Spacewatch	EOS	1.6 km	MPC · JPL
452114	2014 QA_{425}	—	January 19, 2012	Mount Lemmon	Mount Lemmon Survey	·	2.6 km	MPC · JPL
452115	2014 RJ_{1}	—	March 13, 2012	Mount Lemmon	Mount Lemmon Survey	·	2.2 km	MPC · JPL
452116	2014 RD_{23}	—	December 8, 2010	Mount Lemmon	Mount Lemmon Survey	·	3.2 km	MPC · JPL
452117	2014 RM_{24}	—	April 23, 2001	Kitt Peak	Spacewatch	·	2.9 km	MPC · JPL
452118	2014 RP_{31}	—	February 3, 2006	Mount Lemmon	Mount Lemmon Survey	EOS	2.1 km	MPC · JPL
452119	2014 RU_{34}	—	November 30, 2005	Kitt Peak	Spacewatch	·	2.7 km	MPC · JPL
452120	2014 RK_{36}	—	September 26, 2006	Mount Lemmon	Mount Lemmon Survey	·	1.4 km	MPC · JPL
452121	2014 SB_{37}	—	April 11, 2007	Kitt Peak	Spacewatch	·	2.6 km	MPC · JPL
452122	2014 SB_{221}	—	January 17, 2005	Kitt Peak	Spacewatch	·	3.7 km	MPC · JPL
452123	2014 SW_{225}	—	October 26, 2005	Kitt Peak	Spacewatch	·	1.9 km	MPC · JPL
452124	2014 US_{14}	—	October 2, 2003	Kitt Peak	Spacewatch	·	3.0 km	MPC · JPL
452125	2014 WL_{40}	—	July 9, 2004	Socorro	LINEAR	·	2.6 km	MPC · JPL
452126	2014 WX_{66}	—	June 13, 2007	Kitt Peak	Spacewatch	·	1.9 km	MPC · JPL
452127	2015 FU_{223}	—	March 23, 1995	Kitt Peak	Spacewatch	·	650 m	MPC · JPL
452128	2015 KX_{120}	—	April 7, 2003	Kitt Peak	Spacewatch	·	1.3 km	MPC · JPL
452129	2015 OR	—	September 27, 2000	Socorro	LINEAR	·	2.5 km	MPC · JPL
452130	2015 OT_{39}	—	July 19, 2004	Anderson Mesa	LONEOS	·	3.2 km	MPC · JPL
452131	2015 OM_{73}	—	December 1, 2004	Catalina	CSS	·	3.8 km	MPC · JPL
452132	2015 PV	—	September 30, 1999	Catalina	CSS	·	3.1 km	MPC · JPL
452133	2015 PT_{293}	—	May 19, 2010	WISE	WISE	BRA	2.1 km	MPC · JPL
452134	2015 PH_{303}	—	October 10, 2010	Mount Lemmon	Mount Lemmon Survey	EOS	1.7 km	MPC · JPL
452135	2015 PS_{307}	—	January 23, 2006	Mount Lemmon	Mount Lemmon Survey	·	1.4 km	MPC · JPL
452136	2015 PL_{308}	—	September 23, 2004	Kitt Peak	Spacewatch	·	1.3 km	MPC · JPL
452137	2015 PZ_{308}	—	April 25, 2003	Kitt Peak	Spacewatch	·	1.2 km	MPC · JPL
452138	2015 PV_{310}	—	May 5, 2000	Kitt Peak	Spacewatch	·	3.0 km	MPC · JPL
452139	2015 QU	—	December 29, 2003	Kitt Peak	Spacewatch	·	1.4 km	MPC · JPL
452140	2015 QR_{9}	—	November 2, 2007	Mount Lemmon	Mount Lemmon Survey	·	840 m	MPC · JPL
452141	2015 QY_{10}	—	October 23, 2005	Catalina	CSS	·	2.6 km	MPC · JPL
452142	2015 QG_{11}	—	February 9, 2005	Kitt Peak	Spacewatch	·	1.5 km	MPC · JPL
452143	2015 RN_{18}	—	September 13, 2007	Kitt Peak	Spacewatch	H	550 m	MPC · JPL
452144	2015 RL_{19}	—	October 16, 1977	Palomar	C. J. van Houten, I. van Houten-Groeneveld, T. Gehrels	·	670 m	MPC · JPL
452145	2015 RP_{28}	—	October 2, 2000	Kitt Peak	Spacewatch	·	2.4 km	MPC · JPL
452146	2015 RC_{30}	—	September 11, 2004	Kitt Peak	Spacewatch	THM	2.2 km	MPC · JPL
452147	2015 RL_{30}	—	October 1, 2005	Catalina	CSS	H	580 m	MPC · JPL
452148	2015 RA_{31}	—	June 19, 2009	Kitt Peak	Spacewatch	·	2.8 km	MPC · JPL
452149	2015 RG_{33}	—	December 2, 2010	Mount Lemmon	Mount Lemmon Survey	·	3.4 km	MPC · JPL
452150	2015 RB_{35}	—	December 2, 2005	Kitt Peak	Spacewatch	V	610 m	MPC · JPL
452151	2015 RN_{37}	—	October 9, 2004	Kitt Peak	Spacewatch	MAS	640 m	MPC · JPL
452152	2015 RR_{38}	—	January 24, 1996	Kitt Peak	Spacewatch	·	2.7 km	MPC · JPL
452153	2015 RZ_{38}	—	December 11, 2004	Kitt Peak	Spacewatch	NYS	1.1 km	MPC · JPL
452154	2015 RZ_{47}	—	October 11, 2010	Catalina	CSS	·	2.8 km	MPC · JPL
452155	2015 RB_{48}	—	September 12, 2004	Kitt Peak	Spacewatch	V	540 m	MPC · JPL
452156	2015 RX_{51}	—	March 10, 2008	Kitt Peak	Spacewatch	·	2.9 km	MPC · JPL
452157	2015 RJ_{53}	—	August 29, 2005	Kitt Peak	Spacewatch	·	1.8 km	MPC · JPL
452158	2015 RM_{54}	—	September 22, 2004	Kitt Peak	Spacewatch	NYS	910 m	MPC · JPL
452159	2015 RH_{56}	—	April 6, 2008	Mount Lemmon	Mount Lemmon Survey	EOS	1.9 km	MPC · JPL
452160	2015 RR_{56}	—	November 9, 2008	Mount Lemmon	Mount Lemmon Survey	·	860 m	MPC · JPL
452161	2015 RY_{56}	—	September 26, 2006	Mount Lemmon	Mount Lemmon Survey	HOF	3.6 km	MPC · JPL
452162	2015 RY_{57}	—	March 3, 2009	Mount Lemmon	Mount Lemmon Survey	·	3.0 km	MPC · JPL
452163	2015 RZ_{63}	—	November 17, 2006	Kitt Peak	Spacewatch	·	2.1 km	MPC · JPL
452164	2015 RY_{65}	—	June 3, 2010	WISE	WISE	·	2.9 km	MPC · JPL
452165	2015 RC_{69}	—	October 21, 2011	Kitt Peak	Spacewatch	·	1.2 km	MPC · JPL
452166	2015 RV_{69}	—	October 3, 2003	Kitt Peak	Spacewatch	·	1.0 km	MPC · JPL
452167	2015 RR_{72}	—	April 6, 2002	Kitt Peak	Spacewatch	·	3.5 km	MPC · JPL
452168	2015 RV_{72}	—	May 9, 2010	Mount Lemmon	Mount Lemmon Survey	(5)	1.9 km	MPC · JPL
452169	2015 RV_{74}	—	August 30, 2005	Kitt Peak	Spacewatch	EOS	2.0 km	MPC · JPL
452170	2015 RX_{74}	—	April 25, 2003	Kitt Peak	Spacewatch	MAS	740 m	MPC · JPL
452171	2015 RV_{75}	—	December 1, 2005	Kitt Peak	Spacewatch	·	1.6 km	MPC · JPL
452172	2015 RV_{80}	—	March 3, 2000	Kitt Peak	Spacewatch	·	1.6 km	MPC · JPL
452173	2015 RZ_{80}	—	November 18, 2011	Mount Lemmon	Mount Lemmon Survey	·	1.3 km	MPC · JPL
452174	2015 RO_{81}	—	January 30, 2004	Kitt Peak	Spacewatch	·	1.4 km	MPC · JPL
452175	2015 RX_{85}	—	August 27, 2006	Kitt Peak	Spacewatch	EUN	1.3 km	MPC · JPL
452176	2015 RH_{88}	—	November 13, 2002	Socorro	LINEAR	H	440 m	MPC · JPL
452177	2015 RY_{88}	—	April 6, 2008	Kitt Peak	Spacewatch	·	2.7 km	MPC · JPL
452178	2015 RZ_{88}	—	April 16, 2010	WISE	WISE	DOR	2.1 km	MPC · JPL
452179	2015 RH_{89}	—	February 8, 2008	Kitt Peak	Spacewatch	·	2.1 km	MPC · JPL
452180	2015 RK_{89}	—	July 28, 2010	WISE	WISE	EOS	4.3 km	MPC · JPL
452181	2015 RQ_{89}	—	October 13, 2004	Kitt Peak	Spacewatch	MAS	760 m	MPC · JPL
452182	2015 RT_{89}	—	February 4, 2005	Catalina	CSS	·	1.6 km	MPC · JPL
452183	2015 RZ_{89}	—	March 3, 2006	Kitt Peak	Spacewatch	H	530 m	MPC · JPL
452184	2015 RP_{90}	—	August 31, 2000	Socorro	LINEAR	·	1.7 km	MPC · JPL
452185	2015 RA_{91}	—	December 2, 2004	Catalina	CSS	·	3.3 km	MPC · JPL
452186	2015 RM_{91}	—	December 2, 2005	Kitt Peak	Spacewatch	·	650 m	MPC · JPL
452187	2015 RL_{92}	—	March 13, 2002	Socorro	LINEAR	·	3.5 km	MPC · JPL
452188	2015 RZ_{92}	—	May 15, 2009	Kitt Peak	Spacewatch	·	1.8 km	MPC · JPL
452189	2015 RD_{95}	—	October 20, 1998	Kitt Peak	Spacewatch	·	1.1 km	MPC · JPL
452190	2015 RE_{95}	—	October 12, 2007	Mount Lemmon	Mount Lemmon Survey	(5)	1.2 km	MPC · JPL
452191	2015 RE_{97}	—	December 10, 2004	Kitt Peak	Spacewatch	MAS	660 m	MPC · JPL
452192	2015 RG_{97}	—	November 25, 2009	Kitt Peak	Spacewatch	·	650 m	MPC · JPL
452193	2015 RK_{98}	—	December 30, 2005	Mount Lemmon	Mount Lemmon Survey	·	790 m	MPC · JPL
452194	2015 RQ_{100}	—	October 7, 2004	Kitt Peak	Spacewatch	·	3.1 km	MPC · JPL
452195	2015 RT_{101}	—	September 17, 2004	Kitt Peak	Spacewatch	MAS	820 m	MPC · JPL
452196	2015 RB_{102}	—	May 8, 2008	Kitt Peak	Spacewatch	·	560 m	MPC · JPL
452197	2015 RJ_{107}	—	December 20, 2004	Mount Lemmon	Mount Lemmon Survey	·	1.4 km	MPC · JPL
452198	2015 RL_{108}	—	February 20, 2006	Kitt Peak	Spacewatch	·	3.2 km	MPC · JPL
452199	2015 RS_{108}	—	September 22, 2008	Mount Lemmon	Mount Lemmon Survey	NYS	870 m	MPC · JPL
452200	2015 RW_{123}	—	December 3, 2004	Kitt Peak	Spacewatch	MAS	680 m	MPC · JPL

== 452201–452300 ==
back to top

Designation			Discovery			Properties		Ref
Permanent	Provisional	Named after	Date	Site	Discoverer(s)	Category	Diam.	Ref
452201	2015 RU_{152}	—	September 11, 2007	Kitt Peak	Spacewatch	·	960 m	MPC · JPL
452202	2015 RV_{192}	—	February 11, 2002	Socorro	LINEAR	3:2	4.6 km	MPC · JPL
452203	2015 RJ_{194}	—	March 28, 2008	Mount Lemmon	Mount Lemmon Survey	·	2.3 km	MPC · JPL
452204	2015 RK_{194}	—	October 11, 2007	Kitt Peak	Spacewatch	RAF	950 m	MPC · JPL
452205	2015 RV_{195}	—	October 1, 2005	Mount Lemmon	Mount Lemmon Survey	·	580 m	MPC · JPL
452206	2015 RB_{197}	—	September 28, 2006	Kitt Peak	Spacewatch	·	2.0 km	MPC · JPL
452207	2015 RA_{200}	—	October 10, 2004	Kitt Peak	Spacewatch	PHO	920 m	MPC · JPL
452208	2015 RW_{200}	—	October 28, 2008	Mount Lemmon	Mount Lemmon Survey	·	800 m	MPC · JPL
452209	2015 RZ_{200}	—	April 13, 2004	Kitt Peak	Spacewatch	·	1.6 km	MPC · JPL
452210	2015 RA_{201}	—	February 24, 2009	Catalina	CSS	PHO	910 m	MPC · JPL
452211	2015 RE_{206}	—	November 10, 1996	Kitt Peak	Spacewatch	PHO	860 m	MPC · JPL
452212	2015 RN_{214}	—	November 17, 2006	Kitt Peak	Spacewatch	·	890 m	MPC · JPL
452213	2015 RC_{216}	—	September 13, 2005	Kitt Peak	Spacewatch	·	1.7 km	MPC · JPL
452214	2015 RZ_{216}	—	October 25, 2005	Kitt Peak	Spacewatch	·	750 m	MPC · JPL
452215	2015 RN_{217}	—	September 16, 2006	Kitt Peak	Spacewatch	·	1.7 km	MPC · JPL
452216	2015 RP_{217}	—	October 10, 1993	Kitt Peak	Spacewatch	·	930 m	MPC · JPL
452217	2015 RS_{217}	—	February 27, 2006	Kitt Peak	Spacewatch	·	1.2 km	MPC · JPL
452218	2015 RO_{218}	—	September 19, 1996	Kitt Peak	Spacewatch	·	1.1 km	MPC · JPL
452219	2015 RN_{220}	—	November 1, 2010	Mount Lemmon	Mount Lemmon Survey	·	1.6 km	MPC · JPL
452220	2015 RT_{221}	—	October 27, 2005	Kitt Peak	Spacewatch	·	1.9 km	MPC · JPL
452221	2015 RH_{230}	—	April 15, 2010	Mount Lemmon	Mount Lemmon Survey	·	960 m	MPC · JPL
452222	2015 RL_{234}	—	January 26, 2006	Kitt Peak	Spacewatch	LIX	3.9 km	MPC · JPL
452223	2015 RN_{236}	—	December 4, 2007	Mount Lemmon	Mount Lemmon Survey	·	1.7 km	MPC · JPL
452224	2015 RK_{237}	—	January 23, 2006	Mount Lemmon	Mount Lemmon Survey	·	3.2 km	MPC · JPL
452225	2015 RZ_{237}	—	October 27, 2008	Mount Lemmon	Mount Lemmon Survey	·	780 m	MPC · JPL
452226	2015 RA_{238}	—	November 8, 2010	Mount Lemmon	Mount Lemmon Survey	·	1.4 km	MPC · JPL
452227	2015 RJ_{238}	—	December 5, 2010	Kitt Peak	Spacewatch	·	3.9 km	MPC · JPL
452228	2015 RY_{241}	—	October 21, 2007	Mount Lemmon	Mount Lemmon Survey	·	1.2 km	MPC · JPL
452229	2015 RP_{242}	—	February 1, 2006	Kitt Peak	Spacewatch	·	3.6 km	MPC · JPL
452230	2015 RV_{242}	—	April 20, 2009	Catalina	CSS	ADE	2.1 km	MPC · JPL
452231	2015 SD_{1}	—	June 10, 2011	Mount Lemmon	Mount Lemmon Survey	·	1.6 km	MPC · JPL
452232	2015 SB_{5}	—	October 9, 2007	Kitt Peak	Spacewatch	·	1.1 km	MPC · JPL
452233	2015 SH_{5}	—	August 18, 2009	Kitt Peak	Spacewatch	·	3.5 km	MPC · JPL
452234	2015 SL_{7}	—	December 30, 2008	Mount Lemmon	Mount Lemmon Survey	·	3.7 km	MPC · JPL
452235	2015 SX_{7}	—	July 4, 1995	Kitt Peak	Spacewatch	·	2.5 km	MPC · JPL
452236	2015 SG_{10}	—	February 8, 2007	Mount Lemmon	Mount Lemmon Survey	EOS	2.0 km	MPC · JPL
452237	2015 SO_{17}	—	February 6, 2008	Catalina	CSS	·	1.8 km	MPC · JPL
452238	2015 SU_{18}	—	August 27, 2005	Anderson Mesa	LONEOS	·	690 m	MPC · JPL
452239	2015 SZ_{19}	—	October 5, 2005	Catalina	CSS	·	2.8 km	MPC · JPL
452240	2015 SD_{20}	—	June 26, 2003	Socorro	LINEAR	T_{j} (2.98)	5.5 km	MPC · JPL
452241	2015 TX_{1}	—	April 5, 2000	Kitt Peak	Spacewatch	·	830 m	MPC · JPL
452242	2015 TQ_{2}	—	October 9, 2004	Kitt Peak	Spacewatch	NYS	1.2 km	MPC · JPL
452243	2015 TG_{3}	—	October 11, 2004	Kitt Peak	Spacewatch	·	3.3 km	MPC · JPL
452244	2015 TC_{18}	—	December 16, 2004	Anderson Mesa	LONEOS	·	5.2 km	MPC · JPL
452245	2015 TX_{22}	—	April 25, 2007	Mount Lemmon	Mount Lemmon Survey	·	830 m	MPC · JPL
452246	2015 TU_{76}	—	November 18, 2006	Kitt Peak	Spacewatch	MRX	910 m	MPC · JPL
452247	2015 TH_{79}	—	April 7, 2013	Mount Lemmon	Mount Lemmon Survey	(5)	1.7 km	MPC · JPL
452248	2015 TG_{84}	—	June 11, 2011	Mount Lemmon	Mount Lemmon Survey	NYS	1.1 km	MPC · JPL
452249	2015 TH_{94}	—	August 23, 2008	Siding Spring	SSS	·	800 m	MPC · JPL
452250	2015 TB_{101}	—	May 11, 2010	Mount Lemmon	Mount Lemmon Survey	(5)	1.3 km	MPC · JPL
452251	2015 TC_{101}	—	September 1, 2010	Mount Lemmon	Mount Lemmon Survey	·	1.5 km	MPC · JPL
452252	2015 TJ_{103}	—	December 9, 2004	Kitt Peak	Spacewatch	·	1.5 km	MPC · JPL
452253	2015 TB_{117}	—	January 17, 2010	WISE	WISE	·	2.2 km	MPC · JPL
452254	2015 TU_{118}	—	February 1, 2012	Kitt Peak	Spacewatch	·	2.2 km	MPC · JPL
452255	2015 TS_{119}	—	February 7, 1999	Kitt Peak	Spacewatch	ADE	2.2 km	MPC · JPL
452256	2015 TK_{120}	—	February 14, 2010	WISE	WISE	·	3.8 km	MPC · JPL
452257	2015 TW_{121}	—	February 11, 2008	Mount Lemmon	Mount Lemmon Survey	·	1.9 km	MPC · JPL
452258	2015 TC_{122}	—	January 19, 1994	Kitt Peak	Spacewatch	·	3.5 km	MPC · JPL
452259	2015 TM_{127}	—	February 3, 2000	Kitt Peak	Spacewatch	·	2.4 km	MPC · JPL
452260	2015 TY_{127}	—	May 17, 2002	Kitt Peak	Spacewatch	EOS	2.8 km	MPC · JPL
452261	2015 TO_{128}	—	February 20, 2009	Kitt Peak	Spacewatch	EUN	1.4 km	MPC · JPL
452262	2015 TL_{132}	—	November 25, 2005	Catalina	CSS	EOS	2.3 km	MPC · JPL
452263	2015 TY_{135}	—	May 12, 2007	Mount Lemmon	Mount Lemmon Survey	·	4.2 km	MPC · JPL
452264	2015 TH_{138}	—	December 1, 2005	Kitt Peak	Spacewatch	·	2.6 km	MPC · JPL
452265	2015 TG_{139}	—	January 25, 2006	Kitt Peak	Spacewatch	·	2.4 km	MPC · JPL
452266	2015 TX_{142}	—	March 15, 2007	Kitt Peak	Spacewatch	PHO	710 m	MPC · JPL
452267	2015 TZ_{142}	—	November 8, 2007	Mount Lemmon	Mount Lemmon Survey	·	1.1 km	MPC · JPL
452268	2015 TU_{145}	—	October 9, 2004	Kitt Peak	Spacewatch	·	3.0 km	MPC · JPL
452269	2015 TX_{145}	—	February 14, 2004	Kitt Peak	Spacewatch	·	2.0 km	MPC · JPL
452270	2015 TD_{146}	—	September 7, 2004	Kitt Peak	Spacewatch	·	2.5 km	MPC · JPL
452271	2015 TA_{148}	—	October 23, 2011	Kitt Peak	Spacewatch	·	1.7 km	MPC · JPL
452272	2015 TR_{150}	—	September 11, 2004	Kitt Peak	Spacewatch	·	950 m	MPC · JPL
452273	2015 TG_{156}	—	January 4, 2006	Kitt Peak	Spacewatch	NYS	620 m	MPC · JPL
452274	2015 TE_{158}	—	November 18, 2007	Kitt Peak	Spacewatch	·	1.4 km	MPC · JPL
452275	2015 TP_{161}	—	April 7, 2005	Kitt Peak	Spacewatch	·	1.8 km	MPC · JPL
452276	2015 TB_{169}	—	December 29, 2008	Mount Lemmon	Mount Lemmon Survey	MAS	630 m	MPC · JPL
452277	2015 TM_{169}	—	April 4, 2008	Kitt Peak	Spacewatch	TRE	3.4 km	MPC · JPL
452278	2015 TN_{169}	—	April 11, 2003	Kitt Peak	Spacewatch	·	1.1 km	MPC · JPL
452279	2015 TP_{174}	—	December 31, 2008	Kitt Peak	Spacewatch	·	1.1 km	MPC · JPL
452280	2015 TK_{179}	—	June 22, 2011	Mount Lemmon	Mount Lemmon Survey	NYS	1.2 km	MPC · JPL
452281	2015 TU_{179}	—	April 1, 2008	Kitt Peak	Spacewatch	·	1.1 km	MPC · JPL
452282	2015 TU_{199}	—	February 16, 2001	Kitt Peak	Spacewatch	·	710 m	MPC · JPL
452283	2015 TX_{199}	—	October 30, 2005	Mount Lemmon	Mount Lemmon Survey	·	690 m	MPC · JPL
452284	2015 TA_{202}	—	July 10, 2004	Palomar	NEAT	EOS	2.6 km	MPC · JPL
452285	2015 TS_{206}	—	October 4, 2004	Kitt Peak	Spacewatch	MAS	750 m	MPC · JPL
452286	2015 TE_{208}	—	September 9, 2004	Anderson Mesa	LONEOS	·	980 m	MPC · JPL
452287	2015 TC_{209}	—	April 3, 2000	Kitt Peak	Spacewatch	·	3.7 km	MPC · JPL
452288	2015 TD_{209}	—	February 13, 2004	Kitt Peak	Spacewatch	·	1.9 km	MPC · JPL
452289	2015 TW_{209}	—	February 7, 2002	Kitt Peak	Spacewatch	·	1.1 km	MPC · JPL
452290	2015 TF_{210}	—	November 3, 2004	Kitt Peak	Spacewatch	·	3.0 km	MPC · JPL
452291	2015 TP_{223}	—	October 4, 2004	Kitt Peak	Spacewatch	·	810 m	MPC · JPL
452292	2015 TS_{223}	—	November 1, 2000	Socorro	LINEAR	·	1.3 km	MPC · JPL
452293	2015 TF_{225}	—	April 8, 2010	WISE	WISE	·	2.0 km	MPC · JPL
452294	2015 TZ_{234}	—	September 3, 2008	Kitt Peak	Spacewatch	·	650 m	MPC · JPL
452295	2015 TO_{239}	—	December 16, 2003	Kitt Peak	Spacewatch	·	1.4 km	MPC · JPL
452296	2015 TS_{239}	—	April 30, 2009	Kitt Peak	Spacewatch	·	2.5 km	MPC · JPL
452297	2015 TU_{304}	—	October 8, 2008	Catalina	CSS	·	980 m	MPC · JPL
452298	2015 TW_{323}	—	October 20, 2011	Mount Lemmon	Mount Lemmon Survey	·	1.4 km	MPC · JPL
452299	1993 TX_{47}	—	October 12, 1993	La Silla	E. W. Elst	·	2.7 km	MPC · JPL
452300	1994 TC_{6}	—	October 4, 1994	Kitt Peak	Spacewatch	·	610 m	MPC · JPL

== 452301–452400 ==
back to top

Designation			Discovery			Properties		Ref
Permanent	Provisional	Named after	Date	Site	Discoverer(s)	Category	Diam.	Ref
452301	1994 UU_{9}	—	October 28, 1994	Kitt Peak	Spacewatch	·	1.1 km	MPC · JPL
452302	1995 YR_{1}	—	December 20, 1995	Kitt Peak	Spacewatch	APO · PHA	320 m	MPC · JPL
452303	1996 RL_{1}	—	September 9, 1996	Prescott	P. G. Comba	(13314)	1.9 km	MPC · JPL
452304	1996 VC_{33}	—	November 5, 1996	Kitt Peak	Spacewatch	·	970 m	MPC · JPL
452305	1997 BN_{7}	—	January 31, 1997	Kitt Peak	Spacewatch	BRA	1.6 km	MPC · JPL
452306	1997 GF_{29}	—	April 12, 1997	Kitt Peak	Spacewatch	·	1.6 km	MPC · JPL
452307 Manawydan	1997 XV_{11}	Manawydan	December 5, 1997	Caussols	ODAS	AMO	730 m	MPC · JPL
452308	1998 SE_{34}	—	September 26, 1998	Socorro	LINEAR	·	3.1 km	MPC · JPL
452309	1998 SA_{150}	—	September 26, 1998	Socorro	LINEAR	·	1.2 km	MPC · JPL
452310	1998 UA_{14}	—	October 23, 1998	Kitt Peak	Spacewatch	·	1.6 km	MPC · JPL
452311	1998 VS_{41}	—	November 14, 1998	Kitt Peak	Spacewatch	·	2.3 km	MPC · JPL
452312	1998 VC_{43}	—	November 15, 1998	Kitt Peak	Spacewatch	·	1.1 km	MPC · JPL
452313	1998 XR_{16}	—	December 15, 1998	Socorro	LINEAR	APO +1km	1.5 km	MPC · JPL
452314	1999 LN_{28}	—	June 12, 1999	Socorro	LINEAR	AMO	550 m	MPC · JPL
452315	1999 VQ_{116}	—	November 4, 1999	Kitt Peak	Spacewatch	T_{j} (2.98) · 3:2	4.0 km	MPC · JPL
452316	1999 XV_{110}	—	December 5, 1999	Catalina	CSS	·	2.3 km	MPC · JPL
452317	1999 XK_{219}	—	December 15, 1999	Kitt Peak	Spacewatch	H	500 m	MPC · JPL
452318	1999 XE_{260}	—	December 7, 1999	Kitt Peak	Spacewatch	·	3.6 km	MPC · JPL
452319	2000 AC_{44}	—	January 2, 2000	Kitt Peak	Spacewatch	·	1.5 km	MPC · JPL
452320	2000 ER_{15}	—	March 3, 2000	Kitt Peak	Spacewatch	·	1.1 km	MPC · JPL
452321	2000 FP_{73}	—	March 25, 2000	Kitt Peak	Spacewatch	·	1.0 km	MPC · JPL
452322	2000 GG_{121}	—	April 5, 2000	Kitt Peak	Spacewatch	·	610 m	MPC · JPL
452323	2000 KQ_{39}	—	May 24, 2000	Kitt Peak	Spacewatch	·	1.3 km	MPC · JPL
452324	2000 SZ_{99}	—	September 23, 2000	Socorro	LINEAR	·	2.1 km	MPC · JPL
452325	2000 SC_{129}	—	September 26, 2000	Socorro	LINEAR	MAS	800 m	MPC · JPL
452326	2000 SY_{129}	—	September 22, 2000	Socorro	LINEAR	JUN	1.5 km	MPC · JPL
452327	2000 SX_{162}	—	September 27, 2000	Kitt Peak	Spacewatch	·	1.1 km	MPC · JPL
452328	2000 SR_{163}	—	September 24, 2000	Socorro	LINEAR	·	2.4 km	MPC · JPL
452329	2000 SL_{166}	—	September 23, 2000	Socorro	LINEAR	·	1.7 km	MPC · JPL
452330	2000 SJ_{314}	—	September 28, 2000	Socorro	LINEAR	·	1.7 km	MPC · JPL
452331	2000 WC_{159}	—	November 24, 2000	Bergisch Gladbach	W. Bickel	MAS	770 m	MPC · JPL
452332	2001 BG_{29}	—	January 20, 2001	Socorro	LINEAR	·	1.3 km	MPC · JPL
452333	2001 JO	—	May 2, 2001	Palomar	NEAT	T_{j} (2.85)	4.3 km	MPC · JPL
452334	2001 LB	—	June 1, 2001	Socorro	LINEAR	AMO · APO	220 m	MPC · JPL
452335	2001 OF_{113}	—	July 21, 2001	Palomar	NEAT	·	2.8 km	MPC · JPL
452336	2001 QU_{218}	—	August 23, 2001	Anderson Mesa	LONEOS	·	1.6 km	MPC · JPL
452337	2001 RB_{22}	—	September 7, 2001	Socorro	LINEAR	·	540 m	MPC · JPL
452338	2001 RY_{60}	—	September 12, 2001	Socorro	LINEAR	·	1.5 km	MPC · JPL
452339	2001 RY_{152}	—	September 11, 2001	Socorro	LINEAR	·	2.0 km	MPC · JPL
452340	2001 ST_{127}	—	August 24, 2001	Socorro	LINEAR	·	780 m	MPC · JPL
452341	2001 SE_{133}	—	September 16, 2001	Socorro	LINEAR	·	740 m	MPC · JPL
452342	2001 SN_{158}	—	September 17, 2001	Socorro	LINEAR	·	1.6 km	MPC · JPL
452343	2001 SD_{194}	—	September 19, 2001	Socorro	LINEAR	·	1.7 km	MPC · JPL
452344	2001 SP_{202}	—	September 19, 2001	Socorro	LINEAR	·	790 m	MPC · JPL
452345	2001 SU_{202}	—	September 19, 2001	Socorro	LINEAR	·	510 m	MPC · JPL
452346	2001 SM_{285}	—	September 22, 2001	Kitt Peak	Spacewatch	·	1.6 km	MPC · JPL
452347	2001 SW_{339}	—	September 21, 2001	Anderson Mesa	LONEOS	·	2.9 km	MPC · JPL
452348	2001 TG_{45}	—	October 14, 2001	Needville	J. Dellinger, W. G. Dillon	·	2.0 km	MPC · JPL
452349	2001 TA_{109}	—	October 14, 2001	Socorro	LINEAR	PHO	1.0 km	MPC · JPL
452350	2001 TH_{165}	—	October 15, 2001	Palomar	NEAT	·	690 m	MPC · JPL
452351	2001 TT_{188}	—	October 14, 2001	Socorro	LINEAR	·	2.4 km	MPC · JPL
452352	2001 TV_{212}	—	September 25, 2001	Socorro	LINEAR	·	1.5 km	MPC · JPL
452353	2001 UR_{15}	—	October 25, 2001	Desert Eagle	W. K. Y. Yeung	·	690 m	MPC · JPL
452354	2001 UR_{54}	—	October 18, 2001	Socorro	LINEAR	·	1.5 km	MPC · JPL
452355	2001 UA_{106}	—	October 20, 2001	Socorro	LINEAR	·	1.8 km	MPC · JPL
452356	2001 UA_{147}	—	October 23, 2001	Socorro	LINEAR	·	510 m	MPC · JPL
452357	2001 UX_{189}	—	October 18, 2001	Palomar	NEAT	·	600 m	MPC · JPL
452358	2001 UC_{191}	—	September 20, 2001	Kitt Peak	Spacewatch	·	680 m	MPC · JPL
452359	2001 UH_{216}	—	October 24, 2001	Kitt Peak	Spacewatch	·	450 m	MPC · JPL
452360	2001 VX_{51}	—	September 20, 2001	Socorro	LINEAR	·	830 m	MPC · JPL
452361	2001 VD_{63}	—	November 10, 2001	Socorro	LINEAR	·	730 m	MPC · JPL
452362	2001 VH_{125}	—	November 15, 2001	Socorro	LINEAR	·	640 m	MPC · JPL
452363	2001 WO_{18}	—	November 17, 2001	Socorro	LINEAR	·	1.9 km	MPC · JPL
452364	2001 WM_{46}	—	November 19, 2001	Socorro	LINEAR	·	650 m	MPC · JPL
452365	2001 WM_{102}	—	November 20, 2001	Kitt Peak	Spacewatch	·	700 m	MPC · JPL
452366	2001 XL_{4}	—	December 10, 2001	Socorro	LINEAR	PHO	900 m	MPC · JPL
452367	2001 XV_{102}	—	December 14, 2001	Socorro	LINEAR	PHO	1.1 km	MPC · JPL
452368	2001 XU_{141}	—	November 11, 2001	Socorro	LINEAR	H	600 m	MPC · JPL
452369	2001 XF_{167}	—	December 14, 2001	Socorro	LINEAR	·	3.7 km	MPC · JPL
452370	2001 XD_{223}	—	December 15, 2001	Socorro	LINEAR	·	660 m	MPC · JPL
452371	2001 XR_{251}	—	December 14, 2001	Socorro	LINEAR	·	720 m	MPC · JPL
452372	2001 YW_{1}	—	December 18, 2001	Socorro	LINEAR	H	750 m	MPC · JPL
452373	2001 YX_{6}	—	December 17, 2001	Socorro	LINEAR	·	1.6 km	MPC · JPL
452374	2001 YY_{61}	—	December 18, 2001	Socorro	LINEAR	·	1.0 km	MPC · JPL
452375	2001 YV_{158}	—	December 18, 2001	Apache Point	SDSS	H	760 m	MPC · JPL
452376	2002 AC_{5}	—	January 8, 2002	Socorro	LINEAR	APO · PHA	360 m	MPC · JPL
452377	2002 AC_{39}	—	January 9, 2002	Socorro	LINEAR	PHO	880 m	MPC · JPL
452378	2002 AD_{140}	—	January 13, 2002	Socorro	LINEAR	PHO	890 m	MPC · JPL
452379	2002 CW_{39}	—	February 4, 2002	Haleakala	NEAT	PHO	1.1 km	MPC · JPL
452380	2002 CF_{113}	—	February 6, 2002	Socorro	LINEAR	·	1.6 km	MPC · JPL
452381	2002 CR_{159}	—	February 7, 2002	Socorro	LINEAR	PHO	1.1 km	MPC · JPL
452382	2002 CT_{176}	—	January 14, 2002	Socorro	LINEAR	·	1.0 km	MPC · JPL
452383	2002 CQ_{295}	—	February 10, 2002	Socorro	LINEAR	·	2.1 km	MPC · JPL
452384	2002 EV_{8}	—	March 12, 2002	Palomar	NEAT	·	590 m	MPC · JPL
452385	2002 LX_{3}	—	March 20, 2002	Kitt Peak	Spacewatch	·	1.7 km	MPC · JPL
452386	2002 LM_{38}	—	May 5, 2002	Kitt Peak	Spacewatch	·	3.4 km	MPC · JPL
452387	2002 LW_{62}	—	June 13, 2002	Palomar	NEAT	(5)	1.2 km	MPC · JPL
452388	2002 NT_{3}	—	July 9, 2002	Palomar	NEAT	·	1.1 km	MPC · JPL
452389	2002 NW_{16}	—	July 13, 2002	Socorro	LINEAR	AMO +1km	850 m	MPC · JPL
452390	2002 ND_{56}	—	July 14, 2002	Palomar	NEAT	·	1.4 km	MPC · JPL
452391	2002 NB_{67}	—	July 8, 2002	Palomar	NEAT	·	870 m	MPC · JPL
452392	2002 PS_{39}	—	August 7, 2002	Palomar	NEAT	·	4.4 km	MPC · JPL
452393	2002 PB_{88}	—	August 12, 2002	Socorro	LINEAR	·	860 m	MPC · JPL
452394	2002 PO_{99}	—	August 14, 2002	Socorro	LINEAR	·	1 km	MPC · JPL
452395	2002 PC_{107}	—	August 12, 2002	Socorro	LINEAR	RAF	930 m	MPC · JPL
452396	2002 PM_{112}	—	August 8, 2002	Palomar	NEAT	·	1.6 km	MPC · JPL
452397	2002 PD_{130}	—	August 14, 2002	Palomar	NEAT	AMO	320 m	MPC · JPL
452398	2002 PS_{157}	—	August 8, 2002	Palomar	S. F. Hönig	·	1.2 km	MPC · JPL
452399	2002 PW_{183}	—	August 7, 2002	Palomar	NEAT	(5)	1.5 km	MPC · JPL
452400	2002 QY_{121}	—	August 16, 2002	Palomar	NEAT	H	430 m	MPC · JPL

== 452401–452500 ==
back to top

Designation			Discovery			Properties		Ref
Permanent	Provisional	Named after	Date	Site	Discoverer(s)	Category	Diam.	Ref
452401	2002 QO_{144}	—	October 28, 1994	Kitt Peak	Spacewatch	(5)	990 m	MPC · JPL
452402	2002 RD_{95}	—	September 5, 2002	Socorro	LINEAR	·	1.4 km	MPC · JPL
452403	2002 RY_{151}	—	September 12, 2002	Palomar	NEAT	·	1.6 km	MPC · JPL
452404	2002 RH_{182}	—	September 11, 2002	Palomar	NEAT	·	1.7 km	MPC · JPL
452405	2002 RU_{208}	—	September 7, 2002	Socorro	LINEAR	·	1.2 km	MPC · JPL
452406	2002 RQ_{247}	—	September 15, 2002	Palomar	NEAT	·	1.1 km	MPC · JPL
452407	2002 SW	—	September 23, 2002	Palomar	NEAT	·	2.1 km	MPC · JPL
452408	2002 SU_{66}	—	September 16, 2002	Palomar	NEAT	(5)	1.4 km	MPC · JPL
452409	2002 SH_{71}	—	September 26, 2002	Palomar	NEAT	·	1.0 km	MPC · JPL
452410	2002 SQ_{73}	—	September 16, 2002	Palomar	NEAT	·	1.1 km	MPC · JPL
452411	2002 TW_{6}	—	October 1, 2002	Anderson Mesa	LONEOS	·	1.6 km	MPC · JPL
452412	2002 TG_{91}	—	October 3, 2002	Palomar	NEAT	·	1.7 km	MPC · JPL
452413	2002 TX_{91}	—	October 2, 2002	Socorro	LINEAR	·	1.2 km	MPC · JPL
452414	2002 TO_{126}	—	October 4, 2002	Socorro	LINEAR	(5)	1.2 km	MPC · JPL
452415	2002 TL_{181}	—	October 3, 2002	Socorro	LINEAR	·	660 m	MPC · JPL
452416	2002 UA_{2}	—	October 25, 2002	Palomar	NEAT	·	1.7 km	MPC · JPL
452417	2002 UF_{29}	—	October 31, 2002	Socorro	LINEAR	(1547)	1.5 km	MPC · JPL
452418	2002 VF_{24}	—	November 5, 2002	Socorro	LINEAR	(1547)	1.4 km	MPC · JPL
452419	2002 VQ_{85}	—	November 11, 2002	Socorro	LINEAR	·	3.1 km	MPC · JPL
452420	2002 VU_{91}	—	November 6, 2002	Anderson Mesa	LONEOS	·	2.0 km	MPC · JPL
452421	2002 VX_{99}	—	November 13, 2002	Palomar	NEAT	AMO	690 m	MPC · JPL
452422	2002 VB_{117}	—	November 13, 2002	Palomar	NEAT	EUN	1.3 km	MPC · JPL
452423	2002 VD_{147}	—	November 4, 2002	Palomar	NEAT	·	1.3 km	MPC · JPL
452424	2002 WS_{4}	—	November 21, 2002	Palomar	NEAT	·	1.6 km	MPC · JPL
452425	2002 XW_{70}	—	December 10, 2002	Socorro	LINEAR	JUN	1.2 km	MPC · JPL
452426	2002 YR_{12}	—	December 14, 2002	Socorro	LINEAR	H	600 m	MPC · JPL
452427	2003 AA_{52}	—	January 5, 2003	Socorro	LINEAR	·	1.4 km	MPC · JPL
452428	2003 BW_{22}	—	January 25, 2003	Palomar	NEAT	·	1.7 km	MPC · JPL
452429	2003 BE_{29}	—	January 27, 2003	Anderson Mesa	LONEOS	·	2.0 km	MPC · JPL
452430	2003 BS_{71}	—	January 28, 2003	Socorro	LINEAR	H	740 m	MPC · JPL
452431	2003 CL_{8}	—	February 1, 2003	Haleakala	NEAT	·	1.4 km	MPC · JPL
452432	2003 EA_{30}	—	March 6, 2003	Palomar	NEAT	·	2.1 km	MPC · JPL
452433	2003 FS_{22}	—	March 26, 2003	Kitt Peak	Spacewatch	·	850 m	MPC · JPL
452434	2003 FC_{45}	—	March 24, 2003	Kitt Peak	Spacewatch	·	820 m	MPC · JPL
452435	2003 GB	—	March 11, 2003	Socorro	LINEAR	T_{j} (2.88)	2.7 km	MPC · JPL
452436	2003 HJ_{13}	—	April 24, 2003	Kitt Peak	Spacewatch	·	1.1 km	MPC · JPL
452437	2003 KW_{33}	—	May 27, 2003	Kitt Peak	Spacewatch	·	4.3 km	MPC · JPL
452438	2003 QG_{2}	—	August 20, 2003	Socorro	LINEAR	·	5.0 km	MPC · JPL
452439	2003 QC_{68}	—	August 25, 2003	Socorro	LINEAR	·	1.2 km	MPC · JPL
452440	2003 QM_{74}	—	August 24, 2003	Socorro	LINEAR	·	1.4 km	MPC · JPL
452441	2003 QU_{112}	—	August 21, 2003	Socorro	LINEAR	·	4.1 km	MPC · JPL
452442	2003 SD_{29}	—	September 18, 2003	Palomar	NEAT	·	3.8 km	MPC · JPL
452443	2003 SN_{72}	—	September 18, 2003	Kitt Peak	Spacewatch	·	770 m	MPC · JPL
452444	2003 SQ_{111}	—	September 20, 2003	Socorro	LINEAR	T_{j} (2.93)	3.0 km	MPC · JPL
452445	2003 ST_{113}	—	September 16, 2003	Kitt Peak	Spacewatch	·	2.4 km	MPC · JPL
452446	2003 SC_{118}	—	September 16, 2003	Palomar	NEAT	·	1.8 km	MPC · JPL
452447	2003 SE_{203}	—	September 22, 2003	Anderson Mesa	LONEOS	·	1.1 km	MPC · JPL
452448	2003 SG_{205}	—	September 23, 2003	Palomar	NEAT	PHO	870 m	MPC · JPL
452449	2003 SM_{216}	—	September 26, 2003	Socorro	LINEAR	THB	2.9 km	MPC · JPL
452450	2003 SK_{292}	—	September 25, 2003	Palomar	NEAT	·	1.3 km	MPC · JPL
452451	2003 SX_{312}	—	September 17, 2003	Palomar	NEAT	·	1.5 km	MPC · JPL
452452	2003 SU_{331}	—	September 27, 2003	Kitt Peak	Spacewatch	·	4.0 km	MPC · JPL
452453	2003 SG_{338}	—	September 26, 2003	Apache Point	SDSS	NYS	910 m	MPC · JPL
452454	2003 SE_{341}	—	September 16, 2003	Kitt Peak	Spacewatch	HYG	2.4 km	MPC · JPL
452455	2003 SR_{352}	—	September 19, 2003	Campo Imperatore	CINEOS	·	2.4 km	MPC · JPL
452456	2003 SQ_{373}	—	September 26, 2003	Apache Point	SDSS	·	2.5 km	MPC · JPL
452457	2003 SD_{432}	—	September 18, 2003	Kitt Peak	Spacewatch	VER	2.1 km	MPC · JPL
452458	2003 TH_{1}	—	October 4, 2003	Kingsnake	J. V. McClusky	PHO	1.1 km	MPC · JPL
452459	2003 UN_{2}	—	October 16, 2003	Kitt Peak	Spacewatch	·	3.1 km	MPC · JPL
452460	2003 UY_{119}	—	October 18, 2003	Kitt Peak	Spacewatch	·	1.1 km	MPC · JPL
452461	2003 UM_{165}	—	October 21, 2003	Kitt Peak	Spacewatch	·	2.9 km	MPC · JPL
452462	2003 UC_{240}	—	October 24, 2003	Kitt Peak	Spacewatch	·	2.9 km	MPC · JPL
452463	2003 UY_{287}	—	October 1, 2003	Kitt Peak	Spacewatch	MAR	940 m	MPC · JPL
452464	2003 UH_{379}	—	October 22, 2003	Apache Point	SDSS	·	820 m	MPC · JPL
452465	2003 VX_{8}	—	November 15, 2003	Kitt Peak	Spacewatch	·	3.2 km	MPC · JPL
452466	2003 WM_{16}	—	November 18, 2003	Palomar	NEAT	·	3.8 km	MPC · JPL
452467	2003 WN_{31}	—	November 18, 2003	Palomar	NEAT	·	1.1 km	MPC · JPL
452468	2003 WM_{158}	—	September 28, 2003	Kitt Peak	Spacewatch	·	3.8 km	MPC · JPL
452469	2003 YP_{8}	—	December 19, 2003	Kitt Peak	Spacewatch	·	1.6 km	MPC · JPL
452470	2003 YG_{41}	—	December 19, 2003	Kitt Peak	Spacewatch	·	1.5 km	MPC · JPL
452471	2003 YZ_{180}	—	December 18, 2003	Palomar	NEAT	·	1.1 km	MPC · JPL
452472	2004 AY_{14}	—	January 15, 2004	Kitt Peak	Spacewatch	·	870 m	MPC · JPL
452473	2004 BT_{10}	—	January 17, 2004	Haleakala	NEAT	·	1.4 km	MPC · JPL
452474	2004 BG_{11}	—	January 18, 2004	Catalina	CSS	APO	680 m	MPC · JPL
452475	2004 BW_{15}	—	January 18, 2004	Palomar	NEAT	·	2.1 km	MPC · JPL
452476	2004 BZ_{81}	—	January 27, 2004	Kitt Peak	Spacewatch	·	970 m	MPC · JPL
452477	2004 BM_{84}	—	January 25, 2004	Haleakala	NEAT	·	1.9 km	MPC · JPL
452478	2004 BL_{115}	—	January 30, 2004	Socorro	LINEAR	EUN	1.3 km	MPC · JPL
452479	2004 BR_{115}	—	January 22, 2004	Socorro	LINEAR	·	1.1 km	MPC · JPL
452480	2004 CG_{40}	—	February 2, 2004	Socorro	LINEAR	·	2.3 km	MPC · JPL
452481	2004 CG_{58}	—	February 14, 2004	Socorro	LINEAR	·	1.3 km	MPC · JPL
452482	2004 CM_{103}	—	February 12, 2004	Palomar	NEAT	·	1.1 km	MPC · JPL
452483	2004 DR_{34}	—	January 24, 2004	Socorro	LINEAR	·	1.8 km	MPC · JPL
452484	2004 DN_{35}	—	February 19, 2004	Socorro	LINEAR	·	1.3 km	MPC · JPL
452485	2004 DB_{64}	—	February 29, 2004	Kitt Peak	Spacewatch	·	2.2 km	MPC · JPL
452486	2004 EU_{44}	—	March 15, 2004	Kitt Peak	Spacewatch	·	1.4 km	MPC · JPL
452487	2004 FB_{1}	—	March 17, 2004	Mount Graham	Ryan, W. H., Martinez, C. T.	·	1.7 km	MPC · JPL
452488	2004 FW_{25}	—	March 17, 2004	Socorro	LINEAR	·	1.7 km	MPC · JPL
452489	2004 FN_{38}	—	March 17, 2004	Socorro	LINEAR	·	1.9 km	MPC · JPL
452490	2004 FA_{126}	—	March 27, 2004	Socorro	LINEAR	·	1.2 km	MPC · JPL
452491	2004 FB_{131}	—	March 28, 2004	Socorro	LINEAR	·	1.8 km	MPC · JPL
452492	2004 GH_{29}	—	April 12, 2004	Anderson Mesa	LONEOS	·	1.9 km	MPC · JPL
452493	2004 GS_{56}	—	April 13, 2004	Kitt Peak	Spacewatch	·	520 m	MPC · JPL
452494	2004 HX_{32}	—	April 21, 2004	Kitt Peak	Spacewatch	·	1.9 km	MPC · JPL
452495	2004 PO_{22}	—	July 16, 2004	Campo Imperatore	CINEOS	·	960 m	MPC · JPL
452496	2004 PZ_{33}	—	August 8, 2004	Anderson Mesa	LONEOS	·	800 m	MPC · JPL
452497	2004 PW_{63}	—	August 10, 2004	Socorro	LINEAR	·	1.9 km	MPC · JPL
452498	2004 QG_{1}	—	August 19, 2004	Socorro	LINEAR	·	3.4 km	MPC · JPL
452499	2004 QP_{10}	—	August 21, 2004	Siding Spring	SSS	·	880 m	MPC · JPL
452500	2004 RW_{9}	—	September 7, 2004	Socorro	LINEAR	H	580 m	MPC · JPL

== 452501–452600 ==
back to top

Designation			Discovery			Properties		Ref
Permanent	Provisional	Named after	Date	Site	Discoverer(s)	Category	Diam.	Ref
452501	2004 RN_{28}	—	August 10, 2004	Socorro	LINEAR	·	710 m	MPC · JPL
452502	2004 RT_{52}	—	September 8, 2004	Socorro	LINEAR	·	900 m	MPC · JPL
452503	2004 RT_{84}	—	August 17, 2004	Socorro	LINEAR	H	570 m	MPC · JPL
452504	2004 RF_{91}	—	September 8, 2004	Socorro	LINEAR	·	1.8 km	MPC · JPL
452505	2004 RL_{99}	—	August 23, 2004	Kitt Peak	Spacewatch	(2076)	950 m	MPC · JPL
452506	2004 RS_{178}	—	August 22, 2004	Kitt Peak	Spacewatch	·	930 m	MPC · JPL
452507	2004 RL_{179}	—	August 11, 2004	Socorro	LINEAR	·	2.7 km	MPC · JPL
452508	2004 RM_{184}	—	August 22, 2004	Kitt Peak	Spacewatch	·	850 m	MPC · JPL
452509	2004 RU_{185}	—	September 10, 2004	Socorro	LINEAR	·	2.6 km	MPC · JPL
452510	2004 RO_{203}	—	September 11, 2004	Kitt Peak	Spacewatch	·	880 m	MPC · JPL
452511	2004 RD_{251}	—	September 14, 2004	Socorro	LINEAR	·	3.0 km	MPC · JPL
452512	2004 RL_{265}	—	September 10, 2004	Kitt Peak	Spacewatch	·	1.5 km	MPC · JPL
452513	2004 RZ_{266}	—	September 11, 2004	Kitt Peak	Spacewatch	·	560 m	MPC · JPL
452514	2004 RU_{291}	—	September 10, 2004	Socorro	LINEAR	·	2.8 km	MPC · JPL
452515	2004 RC_{301}	—	September 11, 2004	Kitt Peak	Spacewatch	·	1.6 km	MPC · JPL
452516	2004 RW_{321}	—	September 13, 2004	Socorro	LINEAR	·	840 m	MPC · JPL
452517	2004 RY_{335}	—	September 15, 2004	Kitt Peak	Spacewatch	·	800 m	MPC · JPL
452518	2004 RA_{356}	—	September 7, 2004	Kitt Peak	Spacewatch	·	2.1 km	MPC · JPL
452519	2004 SJ_{53}	—	September 10, 2004	Socorro	LINEAR	·	680 m	MPC · JPL
452520	2004 TK_{4}	—	October 4, 2004	Kitt Peak	Spacewatch	·	2.0 km	MPC · JPL
452521	2004 TW_{16}	—	October 9, 2004	Socorro	LINEAR	·	2.9 km	MPC · JPL
452522	2004 TO_{40}	—	October 4, 2004	Kitt Peak	Spacewatch	·	1.1 km	MPC · JPL
452523	2004 TT_{53}	—	October 4, 2004	Kitt Peak	Spacewatch	·	3.1 km	MPC · JPL
452524	2004 TL_{58}	—	October 5, 2004	Kitt Peak	Spacewatch	·	930 m	MPC · JPL
452525	2004 TT_{71}	—	October 6, 2004	Kitt Peak	Spacewatch	·	930 m	MPC · JPL
452526	2004 TJ_{76}	—	October 7, 2004	Kitt Peak	Spacewatch	EOS	2.0 km	MPC · JPL
452527	2004 TN_{77}	—	October 7, 2004	Kitt Peak	Spacewatch	·	2.7 km	MPC · JPL
452528	2004 TP_{83}	—	October 5, 2004	Kitt Peak	Spacewatch	·	770 m	MPC · JPL
452529	2004 TP_{95}	—	September 17, 2004	Kitt Peak	Spacewatch	·	880 m	MPC · JPL
452530	2004 TY_{95}	—	October 5, 2004	Kitt Peak	Spacewatch	EOS	1.7 km	MPC · JPL
452531	2004 TQ_{143}	—	October 4, 2004	Kitt Peak	Spacewatch	·	850 m	MPC · JPL
452532	2004 TV_{152}	—	October 6, 2004	Kitt Peak	Spacewatch	·	1.6 km	MPC · JPL
452533	2004 TC_{164}	—	October 6, 2004	Kitt Peak	Spacewatch	HYG	3.3 km	MPC · JPL
452534	2004 TG_{175}	—	October 9, 2004	Socorro	LINEAR	·	2.2 km	MPC · JPL
452535	2004 TM_{201}	—	October 7, 2004	Kitt Peak	Spacewatch	·	2.6 km	MPC · JPL
452536	2004 TM_{211}	—	October 8, 2004	Kitt Peak	Spacewatch	NYS	730 m	MPC · JPL
452537	2004 TF_{215}	—	October 10, 2004	Kitt Peak	Spacewatch	·	810 m	MPC · JPL
452538	2004 TX_{265}	—	October 9, 2004	Kitt Peak	Spacewatch	·	1.9 km	MPC · JPL
452539	2004 TZ_{272}	—	October 9, 2004	Kitt Peak	Spacewatch	·	2.8 km	MPC · JPL
452540	2004 TH_{275}	—	October 9, 2004	Kitt Peak	Spacewatch	·	1.2 km	MPC · JPL
452541	2004 TT_{335}	—	October 10, 2004	Kitt Peak	Spacewatch	·	2.9 km	MPC · JPL
452542	2004 TD_{343}	—	October 13, 2004	Kitt Peak	Spacewatch	·	740 m	MPC · JPL
452543	2004 TC_{369}	—	October 14, 2004	Kitt Peak	Spacewatch	·	900 m	MPC · JPL
452544	2004 UX_{4}	—	October 16, 2004	Socorro	LINEAR	H	800 m	MPC · JPL
452545	2004 VB_{14}	—	November 4, 2004	Socorro	LINEAR	·	4.3 km	MPC · JPL
452546	2004 VD_{37}	—	October 24, 2004	Kitt Peak	Spacewatch	·	1.0 km	MPC · JPL
452547	2004 VD_{66}	—	November 4, 2004	Kitt Peak	Spacewatch	·	760 m	MPC · JPL
452548	2004 VC_{81}	—	October 9, 2004	Kitt Peak	Spacewatch	·	830 m	MPC · JPL
452549	2004 WS	—	November 3, 2004	Palomar	NEAT	H	590 m	MPC · JPL
452550	2004 WG_{6}	—	November 19, 2004	Socorro	LINEAR	·	3.3 km	MPC · JPL
452551	2004 XV_{29}	—	December 10, 2004	Socorro	LINEAR	·	1.9 km	MPC · JPL
452552	2004 XJ_{68}	—	December 3, 2004	Kitt Peak	Spacewatch	LIX	3.4 km	MPC · JPL
452553	2004 XC_{73}	—	December 10, 2004	Socorro	LINEAR	·	1.3 km	MPC · JPL
452554	2004 XC_{110}	—	November 10, 2004	Kitt Peak	Spacewatch	·	1.1 km	MPC · JPL
452555	2004 XR_{148}	—	December 14, 2004	Socorro	LINEAR	NYS	1.1 km	MPC · JPL
452556	2004 XW_{155}	—	December 14, 2004	Socorro	LINEAR	·	4.8 km	MPC · JPL
452557	2004 YO_{2}	—	December 16, 2004	Socorro	LINEAR	·	1.9 km	MPC · JPL
452558	2004 YL_{12}	—	December 19, 2004	Mount Lemmon	Mount Lemmon Survey	MAS	610 m	MPC · JPL
452559	2004 YV_{26}	—	December 19, 2004	Mount Lemmon	Mount Lemmon Survey	·	830 m	MPC · JPL
452560	2004 YU_{27}	—	December 16, 2004	Kitt Peak	Spacewatch	·	3.3 km	MPC · JPL
452561	2005 AB	—	January 1, 2005	Catalina	CSS	T_{j} (2.79) · AMO +1km · moon	1.1 km	MPC · JPL
452562	2005 AM_{24}	—	January 7, 2005	Catalina	CSS	·	1.8 km	MPC · JPL
452563	2005 AF_{31}	—	January 11, 2005	Socorro	LINEAR	T_{j} (2.96)	4.8 km	MPC · JPL
452564	2005 AX_{37}	—	January 13, 2005	Kitt Peak	Spacewatch	·	4.9 km	MPC · JPL
452565	2005 AW_{65}	—	January 13, 2005	Kitt Peak	Spacewatch	NYS	920 m	MPC · JPL
452566	2005 AJ_{68}	—	January 13, 2005	Catalina	CSS	·	3.9 km	MPC · JPL
452567	2005 AX_{72}	—	December 19, 2004	Mount Lemmon	Mount Lemmon Survey	·	2.7 km	MPC · JPL
452568	2005 BM_{15}	—	January 16, 2005	Kitt Peak	Spacewatch	·	790 m	MPC · JPL
452569	2005 BK_{36}	—	January 16, 2005	Mauna Kea	Veillet, C.	·	1.4 km	MPC · JPL
452570	2005 CV_{7}	—	January 7, 2005	Catalina	CSS	TIR	3.3 km	MPC · JPL
452571	2005 CF_{24}	—	February 2, 2005	Catalina	CSS	·	3.3 km	MPC · JPL
452572	2005 CV_{26}	—	February 1, 2005	Kitt Peak	Spacewatch	·	3.2 km	MPC · JPL
452573	2005 DU_{1}	—	February 28, 2005	Socorro	LINEAR	PHO	1.2 km	MPC · JPL
452574	2005 ES_{36}	—	March 4, 2005	Socorro	LINEAR	·	3.7 km	MPC · JPL
452575	2005 EK_{109}	—	March 4, 2005	Socorro	LINEAR	·	3.6 km	MPC · JPL
452576	2005 EU_{162}	—	March 10, 2005	Mount Lemmon	Mount Lemmon Survey	·	1.3 km	MPC · JPL
452577	2005 EA_{189}	—	March 10, 2005	Siding Spring	SSS	T_{j} (2.99)	3.3 km	MPC · JPL
452578	2005 EV_{221}	—	January 18, 1999	Kitt Peak	Spacewatch	·	3.6 km	MPC · JPL
452579	2005 EB_{276}	—	March 8, 2005	Catalina	CSS	·	1.3 km	MPC · JPL
452580	2005 GW_{49}	—	April 5, 2005	Mount Lemmon	Mount Lemmon Survey	·	860 m	MPC · JPL
452581	2005 GZ_{112}	—	March 10, 2005	Catalina	CSS	·	1.9 km	MPC · JPL
452582	2005 GM_{130}	—	April 7, 2005	Kitt Peak	Spacewatch	·	1.1 km	MPC · JPL
452583	2005 JF_{47}	—	May 3, 2005	Kitt Peak	Spacewatch	ADE	3.3 km	MPC · JPL
452584	2005 JE_{58}	—	April 14, 2005	Kitt Peak	Spacewatch	·	1.5 km	MPC · JPL
452585	2005 JG_{61}	—	May 8, 2005	Kitt Peak	Spacewatch	·	1.2 km	MPC · JPL
452586	2005 JP_{71}	—	May 7, 2005	Kitt Peak	Spacewatch	EUN	1.1 km	MPC · JPL
452587	2005 JH_{79}	—	May 10, 2005	Mount Lemmon	Mount Lemmon Survey	EUN	1.2 km	MPC · JPL
452588	2005 JM_{95}	—	May 8, 2005	Mount Lemmon	Mount Lemmon Survey	·	1.5 km	MPC · JPL
452589	2005 JF_{103}	—	May 9, 2005	Kitt Peak	Spacewatch	·	1.6 km	MPC · JPL
452590	2005 JO_{118}	—	May 10, 2005	Kitt Peak	Spacewatch	·	1.1 km	MPC · JPL
452591	2005 JC_{134}	—	May 14, 2005	Mount Lemmon	Mount Lemmon Survey	·	2.0 km	MPC · JPL
452592	2005 JJ_{177}	—	May 11, 2005	Kitt Peak	Spacewatch	·	810 m	MPC · JPL
452593	2005 LO	—	June 1, 2005	Mount Lemmon	Mount Lemmon Survey	EUN	820 m	MPC · JPL
452594	2005 LA_{3}	—	June 3, 2005	Kitt Peak	Spacewatch	EUN	1.2 km	MPC · JPL
452595	2005 LB_{9}	—	June 1, 2005	Mount Lemmon	Mount Lemmon Survey	·	1.4 km	MPC · JPL
452596	2005 LE_{11}	—	June 3, 2005	Kitt Peak	Spacewatch	·	1.3 km	MPC · JPL
452597	2005 LW_{13}	—	June 4, 2005	Kitt Peak	Spacewatch	·	1.4 km	MPC · JPL
452598	2005 LK_{35}	—	June 10, 2005	Kitt Peak	Spacewatch	·	1.9 km	MPC · JPL
452599	2005 MT_{25}	—	June 27, 2005	Kitt Peak	Spacewatch	·	2.1 km	MPC · JPL
452600	2005 MY_{36}	—	June 30, 2005	Catalina	CSS	·	2.1 km	MPC · JPL

== 452601–452700 ==
back to top

Designation			Discovery			Properties		Ref
Permanent	Provisional	Named after	Date	Site	Discoverer(s)	Category	Diam.	Ref
452601	2005 NZ_{3}	—	November 11, 2001	Kitt Peak	Spacewatch	·	1.8 km	MPC · JPL
452602	2005 NJ_{7}	—	July 3, 2005	Mount Lemmon	Mount Lemmon Survey	·	1.9 km	MPC · JPL
452603	2005 NN_{31}	—	July 4, 2005	Mount Lemmon	Mount Lemmon Survey	·	1.4 km	MPC · JPL
452604	2005 NA_{35}	—	July 5, 2005	Kitt Peak	Spacewatch	·	1.7 km	MPC · JPL
452605	2005 NW_{78}	—	July 12, 2005	Mount Lemmon	Mount Lemmon Survey	·	2.0 km	MPC · JPL
452606	2005 NV_{92}	—	June 15, 2005	Mount Lemmon	Mount Lemmon Survey	BRA	1.3 km	MPC · JPL
452607	2005 OO_{1}	—	July 26, 2005	Palomar	NEAT	·	2.9 km	MPC · JPL
452608	2005 PU	—	June 17, 2005	Mount Lemmon	Mount Lemmon Survey	·	620 m	MPC · JPL
452609	2005 PR_{15}	—	August 4, 2005	Palomar	NEAT	·	2.8 km	MPC · JPL
452610	2005 QD_{27}	—	August 27, 2005	Kitt Peak	Spacewatch	·	680 m	MPC · JPL
452611	2005 QZ_{53}	—	August 28, 2005	Kitt Peak	Spacewatch	DOR	2.6 km	MPC · JPL
452612	2005 QM_{80}	—	August 28, 2005	Anderson Mesa	LONEOS	·	600 m	MPC · JPL
452613	2005 QD_{92}	—	August 26, 2005	Anderson Mesa	LONEOS	·	560 m	MPC · JPL
452614	2005 QA_{123}	—	August 28, 2005	Kitt Peak	Spacewatch	·	1.9 km	MPC · JPL
452615	2005 QM_{123}	—	August 28, 2005	Kitt Peak	Spacewatch	·	590 m	MPC · JPL
452616	2005 QM_{128}	—	August 28, 2005	Kitt Peak	Spacewatch	·	1.7 km	MPC · JPL
452617	2005 QX_{147}	—	August 28, 2005	Siding Spring	SSS	·	2.0 km	MPC · JPL
452618	2005 RT	—	September 1, 2005	Anderson Mesa	LONEOS	·	2.5 km	MPC · JPL
452619	2005 RZ_{31}	—	August 30, 2005	Kitt Peak	Spacewatch	·	680 m	MPC · JPL
452620	2005 SQ_{25}	—	August 28, 2005	Kitt Peak	Spacewatch	·	470 m	MPC · JPL
452621	2005 SZ_{47}	—	September 24, 2005	Kitt Peak	Spacewatch	·	590 m	MPC · JPL
452622	2005 SB_{49}	—	September 24, 2005	Kitt Peak	Spacewatch	critical	1.4 km	MPC · JPL
452623	2005 SZ_{66}	—	September 27, 2005	Kitt Peak	Spacewatch	·	1.3 km	MPC · JPL
452624	2005 SW_{100}	—	September 25, 2005	Kitt Peak	Spacewatch	·	1.6 km	MPC · JPL
452625	2005 SV_{126}	—	September 29, 2005	Mount Lemmon	Mount Lemmon Survey	·	1.8 km	MPC · JPL
452626	2005 SA_{168}	—	July 31, 2005	Palomar	NEAT	·	670 m	MPC · JPL
452627	2005 SA_{174}	—	September 29, 2005	Anderson Mesa	LONEOS	DOR	3.0 km	MPC · JPL
452628	2005 SK_{241}	—	September 30, 2005	Kitt Peak	Spacewatch	·	550 m	MPC · JPL
452629	2005 SJ_{254}	—	September 22, 2005	Palomar	NEAT	·	620 m	MPC · JPL
452630	2005 SZ_{281}	—	September 24, 2005	Apache Point	A. C. Becker	·	1.4 km	MPC · JPL
452631	2005 TT_{29}	—	October 3, 2005	Catalina	CSS	·	550 m	MPC · JPL
452632	2005 TA_{42}	—	October 3, 2005	Catalina	CSS	·	550 m	MPC · JPL
452633	2005 TM_{50}	—	October 1, 2005	Catalina	CSS	·	2.1 km	MPC · JPL
452634	2005 TJ_{106}	—	October 9, 2005	Kitt Peak	Spacewatch	·	550 m	MPC · JPL
452635	2005 TU_{122}	—	September 29, 2005	Mount Lemmon	Mount Lemmon Survey	·	1.4 km	MPC · JPL
452636	2005 TN_{126}	—	October 7, 2005	Kitt Peak	Spacewatch	KOR	1.2 km	MPC · JPL
452637	2005 TZ_{156}	—	September 29, 2005	Kitt Peak	Spacewatch	·	510 m	MPC · JPL
452638	2005 TO_{191}	—	October 1, 2005	Kitt Peak	Spacewatch	·	1.5 km	MPC · JPL
452639	2005 UY_{6}	—	October 29, 2005	Palomar	NEAT	T_{j} (2.94) · APO +1km	2.2 km	MPC · JPL
452640	2005 UG_{66}	—	October 22, 2005	Catalina	CSS	·	2.2 km	MPC · JPL
452641	2005 UP_{84}	—	October 22, 2005	Kitt Peak	Spacewatch	KOR	1.1 km	MPC · JPL
452642	2005 UH_{85}	—	October 22, 2005	Kitt Peak	Spacewatch	·	1.9 km	MPC · JPL
452643	2005 UJ_{115}	—	October 23, 2005	Kitt Peak	Spacewatch	·	610 m	MPC · JPL
452644	2005 UK_{116}	—	October 23, 2005	Catalina	CSS	·	2.8 km	MPC · JPL
452645	2005 UW_{128}	—	October 24, 2005	Kitt Peak	Spacewatch	·	540 m	MPC · JPL
452646	2005 UZ_{129}	—	October 24, 2005	Kitt Peak	Spacewatch	·	1.7 km	MPC · JPL
452647	2005 UK_{134}	—	October 25, 2005	Anderson Mesa	LONEOS	EUN	1.2 km	MPC · JPL
452648	2005 UZ_{142}	—	October 25, 2005	Mount Lemmon	Mount Lemmon Survey	·	640 m	MPC · JPL
452649	2005 UN_{185}	—	October 25, 2005	Mount Lemmon	Mount Lemmon Survey	·	550 m	MPC · JPL
452650	2005 UG_{228}	—	October 25, 2005	Kitt Peak	Spacewatch	·	1.9 km	MPC · JPL
452651	2005 UP_{231}	—	October 25, 2005	Mount Lemmon	Mount Lemmon Survey	·	440 m	MPC · JPL
452652	2005 UU_{258}	—	October 25, 2005	Kitt Peak	Spacewatch	KOR	1.1 km	MPC · JPL
452653	2005 UE_{264}	—	October 27, 2005	Kitt Peak	Spacewatch	·	680 m	MPC · JPL
452654	2005 UT_{334}	—	October 29, 2005	Mount Lemmon	Mount Lemmon Survey	·	910 m	MPC · JPL
452655	2005 UO_{364}	—	October 27, 2005	Kitt Peak	Spacewatch	·	2.1 km	MPC · JPL
452656	2005 UW_{406}	—	October 12, 2005	Kitt Peak	Spacewatch	KOR	980 m	MPC · JPL
452657	2005 UA_{449}	—	October 30, 2005	Kitt Peak	Spacewatch	·	2.4 km	MPC · JPL
452658	2005 UN_{472}	—	October 30, 2005	Kitt Peak	Spacewatch	·	500 m	MPC · JPL
452659	2005 UZ_{487}	—	October 23, 2005	Catalina	CSS	·	2.4 km	MPC · JPL
452660	2005 UU_{488}	—	October 23, 2005	Catalina	CSS	·	820 m	MPC · JPL
452661	2005 UD_{512}	—	October 29, 2005	Catalina	CSS	·	2.0 km	MPC · JPL
452662	2005 VE_{9}	—	October 24, 2005	Kitt Peak	Spacewatch	EOS	1.9 km	MPC · JPL
452663	2005 VS_{23}	—	September 30, 2005	Mount Lemmon	Mount Lemmon Survey	·	1.7 km	MPC · JPL
452664	2005 VA_{24}	—	November 1, 2005	Kitt Peak	Spacewatch	·	1.8 km	MPC · JPL
452665	2005 WX_{46}	—	November 25, 2005	Kitt Peak	Spacewatch	·	2.0 km	MPC · JPL
452666	2005 WP_{54}	—	November 26, 2005	Socorro	LINEAR	·	1.5 km	MPC · JPL
452667	2005 WO_{66}	—	November 22, 2005	Kitt Peak	Spacewatch	·	1.6 km	MPC · JPL
452668	2005 WQ_{92}	—	November 25, 2005	Mount Lemmon	Mount Lemmon Survey	·	2.1 km	MPC · JPL
452669	2005 WH_{100}	—	November 28, 2005	Catalina	CSS	·	560 m	MPC · JPL
452670	2005 WU_{122}	—	October 25, 2005	Kitt Peak	Spacewatch	·	2.0 km	MPC · JPL
452671	2005 WG_{133}	—	November 25, 2005	Mount Lemmon	Mount Lemmon Survey	EOS	1.8 km	MPC · JPL
452672	2005 WN_{143}	—	November 22, 2005	Kitt Peak	Spacewatch	V	820 m	MPC · JPL
452673	2005 WQ_{146}	—	November 25, 2005	Kitt Peak	Spacewatch	(16286)	1.6 km	MPC · JPL
452674	2005 WU_{161}	—	November 5, 2005	Kitt Peak	Spacewatch	·	660 m	MPC · JPL
452675	2005 WD_{175}	—	November 30, 2005	Kitt Peak	Spacewatch	·	530 m	MPC · JPL
452676	2005 WP_{179}	—	November 21, 2005	Catalina	CSS	BRA	2.0 km	MPC · JPL
452677	2005 WS_{204}	—	November 25, 2005	Mount Lemmon	Mount Lemmon Survey	·	580 m	MPC · JPL
452678	2005 XC_{16}	—	November 1, 2005	Mount Lemmon	Mount Lemmon Survey	·	720 m	MPC · JPL
452679	2005 XZ_{20}	—	October 29, 2005	Kitt Peak	Spacewatch	KOR	1.1 km	MPC · JPL
452680	2005 XA_{25}	—	December 2, 2005	Kitt Peak	Spacewatch	·	3.7 km	MPC · JPL
452681	2005 XZ_{39}	—	December 5, 2005	Mount Lemmon	Mount Lemmon Survey	·	460 m	MPC · JPL
452682	2005 XF_{44}	—	December 2, 2005	Kitt Peak	Spacewatch	KOR	1.2 km	MPC · JPL
452683	2005 XB_{59}	—	December 3, 2005	Kitt Peak	Spacewatch	·	2.6 km	MPC · JPL
452684	2005 XK_{59}	—	December 3, 2005	Kitt Peak	Spacewatch	·	2.8 km	MPC · JPL
452685	2005 XT_{68}	—	December 6, 2005	Kitt Peak	Spacewatch	KOR	1.2 km	MPC · JPL
452686	2005 XN_{71}	—	December 2, 2005	Kitt Peak	Spacewatch	·	3.1 km	MPC · JPL
452687	2005 XX_{80}	—	November 25, 2005	Mount Lemmon	Mount Lemmon Survey	EOS	1.7 km	MPC · JPL
452688	2005 XC_{81}	—	November 10, 2005	Mount Lemmon	Mount Lemmon Survey	EOS	1.6 km	MPC · JPL
452689	2005 XF_{85}	—	October 25, 2005	Mount Lemmon	Mount Lemmon Survey	·	620 m	MPC · JPL
452690	2005 XK_{116}	—	December 1, 2005	Kitt Peak	Spacewatch	·	3.1 km	MPC · JPL
452691	2005 YW_{3}	—	December 23, 2005	Palomar	NEAT	T_{j} (2.88)	4.7 km	MPC · JPL
452692	2005 YA_{12}	—	November 30, 2005	Kitt Peak	Spacewatch	·	670 m	MPC · JPL
452693	2005 YB_{21}	—	December 24, 2005	Kitt Peak	Spacewatch	·	600 m	MPC · JPL
452694	2005 YA_{29}	—	December 24, 2005	Kitt Peak	Spacewatch	H	540 m	MPC · JPL
452695	2005 YE_{31}	—	December 22, 2005	Kitt Peak	Spacewatch	EOS	2.0 km	MPC · JPL
452696	2005 YL_{37}	—	December 21, 2005	Catalina	CSS	·	3.5 km	MPC · JPL
452697	2005 YW_{53}	—	December 24, 2005	Kitt Peak	Spacewatch	·	480 m	MPC · JPL
452698	2005 YR_{63}	—	December 2, 2005	Mount Lemmon	Mount Lemmon Survey	·	1.9 km	MPC · JPL
452699	2005 YU_{64}	—	May 9, 2000	Kitt Peak	Spacewatch	·	790 m	MPC · JPL
452700	2005 YO_{72}	—	December 24, 2005	Kitt Peak	Spacewatch	·	1.4 km	MPC · JPL

== 452701–452800 ==
back to top

Designation			Discovery			Properties		Ref
Permanent	Provisional	Named after	Date	Site	Discoverer(s)	Category	Diam.	Ref
452701	2005 YZ_{74}	—	December 4, 2005	Kitt Peak	Spacewatch	THM	1.7 km	MPC · JPL
452702	2005 YH_{79}	—	December 24, 2005	Kitt Peak	Spacewatch	·	610 m	MPC · JPL
452703	2005 YN_{84}	—	October 12, 2005	Kitt Peak	Spacewatch	·	2.0 km	MPC · JPL
452704	2005 YK_{88}	—	December 25, 2005	Mount Lemmon	Mount Lemmon Survey	·	2.4 km	MPC · JPL
452705	2005 YX_{92}	—	December 27, 2005	Mount Lemmon	Mount Lemmon Survey	·	720 m	MPC · JPL
452706	2005 YL_{103}	—	December 1, 2005	Kitt Peak	Spacewatch	EOS	1.7 km	MPC · JPL
452707	2005 YA_{111}	—	November 30, 2005	Mount Lemmon	Mount Lemmon Survey	EOS	2.0 km	MPC · JPL
452708	2005 YQ_{111}	—	December 25, 2005	Kitt Peak	Spacewatch	EOS	2.1 km	MPC · JPL
452709	2005 YT_{120}	—	December 27, 2005	Kitt Peak	Spacewatch	·	2.6 km	MPC · JPL
452710	2005 YA_{122}	—	October 29, 2005	Mount Lemmon	Mount Lemmon Survey	EOS	2.2 km	MPC · JPL
452711	2005 YA_{124}	—	December 25, 2005	Kitt Peak	Spacewatch	H	490 m	MPC · JPL
452712	2005 YV_{130}	—	December 25, 2005	Mount Lemmon	Mount Lemmon Survey	·	670 m	MPC · JPL
452713	2005 YP_{136}	—	December 26, 2005	Kitt Peak	Spacewatch	·	600 m	MPC · JPL
452714	2005 YY_{137}	—	December 26, 2005	Kitt Peak	Spacewatch	·	2.8 km	MPC · JPL
452715	2005 YN_{159}	—	December 27, 2005	Kitt Peak	Spacewatch	EOS	1.5 km	MPC · JPL
452716	2005 YS_{160}	—	December 27, 2005	Kitt Peak	Spacewatch	EMA	2.4 km	MPC · JPL
452717	2005 YZ_{185}	—	December 30, 2005	Kitt Peak	Spacewatch	·	1.9 km	MPC · JPL
452718	2005 YV_{187}	—	December 28, 2005	Kitt Peak	Spacewatch	·	1.6 km	MPC · JPL
452719	2005 YD_{199}	—	December 25, 2005	Mount Lemmon	Mount Lemmon Survey	·	1.8 km	MPC · JPL
452720	2005 YJ_{199}	—	December 25, 2005	Kitt Peak	Spacewatch	·	730 m	MPC · JPL
452721	2005 YT_{215}	—	December 29, 2005	Kitt Peak	Spacewatch	·	2.5 km	MPC · JPL
452722	2005 YE_{253}	—	December 29, 2005	Kitt Peak	Spacewatch	EOS	1.6 km	MPC · JPL
452723	2005 YA_{266}	—	December 27, 2005	Kitt Peak	Spacewatch	·	1.6 km	MPC · JPL
452724	2005 YT_{275}	—	December 21, 2005	Kitt Peak	Spacewatch	·	2.2 km	MPC · JPL
452725	2006 AX_{7}	—	October 7, 2005	Mount Lemmon	Mount Lemmon Survey	·	3.1 km	MPC · JPL
452726	2006 AN_{36}	—	January 4, 2006	Kitt Peak	Spacewatch	·	550 m	MPC · JPL
452727	2006 AR_{37}	—	January 4, 2006	Kitt Peak	Spacewatch	·	2.7 km	MPC · JPL
452728	2006 AK_{40}	—	December 30, 2005	Kitt Peak	Spacewatch	·	2.3 km	MPC · JPL
452729	2006 AR_{66}	—	January 9, 2006	Kitt Peak	Spacewatch	·	2.3 km	MPC · JPL
452730	2006 AM_{85}	—	October 28, 2005	Mount Lemmon	Mount Lemmon Survey	TIR	3.6 km	MPC · JPL
452731	2006 AP_{91}	—	January 7, 2006	Mount Lemmon	Mount Lemmon Survey	EOS	2.1 km	MPC · JPL
452732	2006 AX_{105}	—	January 8, 2006	Mount Lemmon	Mount Lemmon Survey	·	3.0 km	MPC · JPL
452733	2006 BF_{21}	—	January 22, 2006	Mount Lemmon	Mount Lemmon Survey	EOS	1.9 km	MPC · JPL
452734	2006 BU_{25}	—	January 23, 2006	Junk Bond	D. Healy	·	2.1 km	MPC · JPL
452735	2006 BG_{35}	—	January 22, 2006	Mount Lemmon	Mount Lemmon Survey	·	1 km	MPC · JPL
452736	2006 BP_{44}	—	January 23, 2006	Mount Lemmon	Mount Lemmon Survey	·	2.2 km	MPC · JPL
452737	2006 BS_{49}	—	January 25, 2006	Kitt Peak	Spacewatch	·	590 m	MPC · JPL
452738	2006 BT_{63}	—	January 10, 2006	Kitt Peak	Spacewatch	·	2.6 km	MPC · JPL
452739	2006 BC_{65}	—	January 22, 2006	Mount Lemmon	Mount Lemmon Survey	EOS	1.7 km	MPC · JPL
452740	2006 BJ_{69}	—	January 23, 2006	Kitt Peak	Spacewatch	·	2.3 km	MPC · JPL
452741	2006 BJ_{108}	—	January 25, 2006	Kitt Peak	Spacewatch	·	2.7 km	MPC · JPL
452742	2006 BF_{111}	—	January 25, 2006	Kitt Peak	Spacewatch	·	2.9 km	MPC · JPL
452743	2006 BA_{132}	—	January 26, 2006	Kitt Peak	Spacewatch	·	1.1 km	MPC · JPL
452744	2006 BH_{146}	—	January 22, 2006	Mount Lemmon	Mount Lemmon Survey	·	2.4 km	MPC · JPL
452745	2006 BL_{156}	—	January 25, 2006	Kitt Peak	Spacewatch	·	2.2 km	MPC · JPL
452746	2006 BD_{160}	—	January 26, 2006	Kitt Peak	Spacewatch	·	750 m	MPC · JPL
452747	2006 BA_{174}	—	January 27, 2006	Kitt Peak	Spacewatch	·	2.3 km	MPC · JPL
452748	2006 BQ_{179}	—	January 27, 2006	Mount Lemmon	Mount Lemmon Survey	·	2.1 km	MPC · JPL
452749	2006 BQ_{186}	—	January 28, 2006	Mount Lemmon	Mount Lemmon Survey	·	480 m	MPC · JPL
452750	2006 BE_{192}	—	January 30, 2006	Kitt Peak	Spacewatch	·	2.1 km	MPC · JPL
452751	2006 BA_{200}	—	January 30, 2006	Kitt Peak	Spacewatch	·	3.0 km	MPC · JPL
452752	2006 BJ_{211}	—	January 31, 2006	Kitt Peak	Spacewatch	THM	2.0 km	MPC · JPL
452753	2006 BD_{221}	—	January 25, 2006	Kitt Peak	Spacewatch	THM	2.1 km	MPC · JPL
452754	2006 BV_{230}	—	January 31, 2006	Kitt Peak	Spacewatch	·	600 m	MPC · JPL
452755	2006 BV_{246}	—	January 31, 2006	Kitt Peak	Spacewatch	·	2.2 km	MPC · JPL
452756	2006 BB_{249}	—	January 25, 2006	Kitt Peak	Spacewatch	THM	2.2 km	MPC · JPL
452757	2006 BB_{256}	—	January 31, 2006	Kitt Peak	Spacewatch	·	2.8 km	MPC · JPL
452758	2006 BT_{256}	—	January 23, 2006	Kitt Peak	Spacewatch	·	2.6 km	MPC · JPL
452759	2006 BN_{260}	—	January 31, 2006	Kitt Peak	Spacewatch	THM	2.1 km	MPC · JPL
452760	2006 BQ_{264}	—	January 4, 2006	Mount Lemmon	Mount Lemmon Survey	LIX	3.4 km	MPC · JPL
452761	2006 BW_{269}	—	January 8, 2006	Catalina	CSS	·	3.6 km	MPC · JPL
452762	2006 BV_{283}	—	January 23, 2006	Mount Lemmon	Mount Lemmon Survey	·	1.4 km	MPC · JPL
452763	2006 CB_{8}	—	February 1, 2006	Mount Lemmon	Mount Lemmon Survey	·	1.8 km	MPC · JPL
452764	2006 CB_{21}	—	February 1, 2006	Mount Lemmon	Mount Lemmon Survey	·	2.4 km	MPC · JPL
452765	2006 CR_{27}	—	January 5, 2006	Mount Lemmon	Mount Lemmon Survey	·	2.4 km	MPC · JPL
452766	2006 CQ_{35}	—	January 18, 2006	Catalina	CSS	·	2.8 km	MPC · JPL
452767	2006 CD_{37}	—	January 20, 2006	Kitt Peak	Spacewatch	·	2.6 km	MPC · JPL
452768	2006 CC_{44}	—	February 2, 2006	Kitt Peak	Spacewatch	·	3.1 km	MPC · JPL
452769	2006 CJ_{44}	—	January 22, 2006	Mount Lemmon	Mount Lemmon Survey	·	3.0 km	MPC · JPL
452770	2006 CA_{47}	—	February 3, 2006	Kitt Peak	Spacewatch	·	480 m	MPC · JPL
452771	2006 CS_{66}	—	December 13, 1999	Kitt Peak	Spacewatch	HYG	2.4 km	MPC · JPL
452772	2006 DB_{12}	—	February 2, 2006	Kitt Peak	Spacewatch	·	2.8 km	MPC · JPL
452773	2006 DM_{14}	—	February 22, 2006	Anderson Mesa	LONEOS	·	1.7 km	MPC · JPL
452774	2006 DL_{17}	—	February 1, 2006	Kitt Peak	Spacewatch	·	2.4 km	MPC · JPL
452775	2006 DW_{27}	—	February 20, 2006	Kitt Peak	Spacewatch	·	2.9 km	MPC · JPL
452776	2006 DY_{39}	—	February 2, 2006	Mount Lemmon	Mount Lemmon Survey	·	1.8 km	MPC · JPL
452777	2006 DT_{45}	—	February 20, 2006	Kitt Peak	Spacewatch	·	1.8 km	MPC · JPL
452778	2006 DL_{79}	—	February 24, 2006	Kitt Peak	Spacewatch	·	1.4 km	MPC · JPL
452779	2006 DB_{90}	—	February 24, 2006	Kitt Peak	Spacewatch	·	2.7 km	MPC · JPL
452780	2006 DC_{94}	—	February 24, 2006	Kitt Peak	Spacewatch	·	830 m	MPC · JPL
452781	2006 DY_{112}	—	February 27, 2006	Kitt Peak	Spacewatch	·	740 m	MPC · JPL
452782	2006 DT_{140}	—	February 25, 2006	Kitt Peak	Spacewatch	·	710 m	MPC · JPL
452783	2006 DE_{215}	—	February 21, 2006	Mount Lemmon	Mount Lemmon Survey	·	470 m	MPC · JPL
452784	2006 EZ_{63}	—	March 5, 2006	Kitt Peak	Spacewatch	·	2.7 km	MPC · JPL
452785	2006 EV_{64}	—	March 5, 2006	Kitt Peak	Spacewatch	HYG	2.5 km	MPC · JPL
452786	2006 ED_{73}	—	March 4, 2006	Mount Lemmon	Mount Lemmon Survey	·	2.0 km	MPC · JPL
452787	2006 FS_{17}	—	March 23, 2006	Kitt Peak	Spacewatch	·	850 m	MPC · JPL
452788	2006 FX_{39}	—	March 25, 2006	Kitt Peak	Spacewatch	·	680 m	MPC · JPL
452789	2006 FK_{50}	—	December 4, 2005	Kitt Peak	Spacewatch	PHO	1.1 km	MPC · JPL
452790	2006 FL_{50}	—	February 27, 2006	Catalina	CSS	·	3.7 km	MPC · JPL
452791	2006 GY_{24}	—	March 23, 2006	Kitt Peak	Spacewatch	·	810 m	MPC · JPL
452792	2006 GV_{41}	—	April 7, 2006	Anderson Mesa	LONEOS	·	4.7 km	MPC · JPL
452793	2006 GT_{47}	—	April 9, 2006	Kitt Peak	Spacewatch	MAS	550 m	MPC · JPL
452794	2006 HF_{21}	—	April 20, 2006	Kitt Peak	Spacewatch	·	910 m	MPC · JPL
452795	2006 HW_{23}	—	April 2, 2006	Kitt Peak	Spacewatch	·	1.2 km	MPC · JPL
452796	2006 HO_{30}	—	February 25, 2006	Catalina	CSS	·	3.2 km	MPC · JPL
452797	2006 HC_{56}	—	April 24, 2006	Anderson Mesa	LONEOS	·	1.5 km	MPC · JPL
452798	2006 HU_{111}	—	April 30, 2006	Catalina	CSS	·	1.4 km	MPC · JPL
452799	2006 HP_{113}	—	April 25, 2006	Kitt Peak	Spacewatch	·	3.0 km	MPC · JPL
452800	2006 JR_{5}	—	May 3, 2006	Mount Lemmon	Mount Lemmon Survey	NYS	1.1 km	MPC · JPL

== 452801–452900 ==
back to top

Designation			Discovery			Properties		Ref
Permanent	Provisional	Named after	Date	Site	Discoverer(s)	Category	Diam.	Ref
452801	2006 JR_{53}	—	April 26, 2006	Mount Lemmon	Mount Lemmon Survey	ERI	1.4 km	MPC · JPL
452802	2006 JE_{56}	—	April 2, 2006	Anderson Mesa	LONEOS	·	2.7 km	MPC · JPL
452803	2006 KE_{15}	—	May 20, 2006	Catalina	CSS	·	1.5 km	MPC · JPL
452804	2006 KY_{25}	—	May 20, 2006	Kitt Peak	Spacewatch	·	4.4 km	MPC · JPL
452805	2006 KQ_{54}	—	May 6, 2006	Mount Lemmon	Mount Lemmon Survey	·	1.2 km	MPC · JPL
452806	2006 KE_{66}	—	May 3, 2006	Kitt Peak	Spacewatch	·	1.2 km	MPC · JPL
452807	2006 KV_{89}	—	May 30, 2006	Socorro	LINEAR	APO · PHA	180 m	MPC · JPL
452808	2006 KL_{94}	—	May 8, 2006	Mount Lemmon	Mount Lemmon Survey	·	1.0 km	MPC · JPL
452809	2006 KC_{119}	—	May 30, 2006	Mount Lemmon	Mount Lemmon Survey	H	640 m	MPC · JPL
452810	2006 LE_{4}	—	June 7, 2006	Siding Spring	SSS	·	2.0 km	MPC · JPL
452811	2006 PO_{4}	—	August 15, 2006	Hibiscus	S. F. Hönig	·	1.3 km	MPC · JPL
452812	2006 PD_{19}	—	August 13, 2006	Palomar	NEAT	PHO	1.2 km	MPC · JPL
452813	2006 PA_{20}	—	July 30, 2006	Siding Spring	SSS	·	1.8 km	MPC · JPL
452814	2006 PE_{23}	—	August 12, 2006	Palomar	NEAT	T_{j} (2.93)	4.0 km	MPC · JPL
452815	2006 PJ_{26}	—	July 21, 2006	Catalina	CSS	·	1.2 km	MPC · JPL
452816	2006 PM_{27}	—	August 13, 2006	Siding Spring	SSS	·	2.1 km	MPC · JPL
452817	2006 QB_{28}	—	August 20, 2006	Palomar	NEAT	·	1.9 km	MPC · JPL
452818	2006 QU_{29}	—	August 17, 2006	Palomar	NEAT	·	2.0 km	MPC · JPL
452819	2006 QN_{115}	—	August 27, 2006	Anderson Mesa	LONEOS	·	1.9 km	MPC · JPL
452820	2006 QA_{125}	—	August 16, 2006	Palomar	NEAT	T_{j} (2.98)	3.6 km	MPC · JPL
452821	2006 QA_{141}	—	August 18, 2006	Palomar	NEAT	·	1.4 km	MPC · JPL
452822	2006 QR_{158}	—	August 19, 2006	Kitt Peak	Spacewatch	·	1.8 km	MPC · JPL
452823	2006 QH_{168}	—	August 30, 2006	Anderson Mesa	LONEOS	EUN	1.3 km	MPC · JPL
452824	2006 QM_{169}	—	August 27, 2006	Anderson Mesa	LONEOS	·	1.5 km	MPC · JPL
452825	2006 QE_{186}	—	August 29, 2006	Anderson Mesa	LONEOS	ADE	3.1 km	MPC · JPL
452826	2006 RF_{4}	—	September 12, 2006	Catalina	CSS	·	1.4 km	MPC · JPL
452827	2006 RF_{28}	—	September 14, 2006	Palomar	NEAT	·	1.4 km	MPC · JPL
452828	2006 RH_{44}	—	September 14, 2006	Kitt Peak	Spacewatch	·	1.8 km	MPC · JPL
452829	2006 RD_{54}	—	September 14, 2006	Kitt Peak	Spacewatch	·	1.2 km	MPC · JPL
452830	2006 RR_{58}	—	September 15, 2006	Kitt Peak	Spacewatch	·	1.4 km	MPC · JPL
452831	2006 RH_{62}	—	August 29, 2006	Kitt Peak	Spacewatch	EUN	1.2 km	MPC · JPL
452832	2006 RO_{77}	—	September 15, 2006	Kitt Peak	Spacewatch	·	1.2 km	MPC · JPL
452833	2006 RA_{79}	—	September 15, 2006	Kitt Peak	Spacewatch	·	1.6 km	MPC · JPL
452834	2006 RA_{82}	—	September 15, 2006	Kitt Peak	Spacewatch	·	1.4 km	MPC · JPL
452835	2006 RS_{91}	—	September 15, 2006	Kitt Peak	Spacewatch	·	1.4 km	MPC · JPL
452836	2006 RT_{99}	—	September 12, 2006	Siding Spring	SSS	·	2.1 km	MPC · JPL
452837	2006 RW_{100}	—	September 14, 2006	Catalina	CSS	·	1.4 km	MPC · JPL
452838	2006 SN_{16}	—	September 17, 2006	Kitt Peak	Spacewatch	LEO	1.6 km	MPC · JPL
452839	2006 SZ_{22}	—	September 17, 2006	Anderson Mesa	LONEOS	·	3.1 km	MPC · JPL
452840	2006 SZ_{27}	—	September 17, 2006	Kitt Peak	Spacewatch	·	1.2 km	MPC · JPL
452841	2006 SU_{53}	—	September 16, 2006	Catalina	CSS	MAR	1.3 km	MPC · JPL
452842	2006 SC_{60}	—	September 18, 2006	Catalina	CSS	·	1.6 km	MPC · JPL
452843	2006 SU_{63}	—	September 18, 2006	Catalina	CSS	·	1.7 km	MPC · JPL
452844	2006 SB_{66}	—	September 19, 2006	Anderson Mesa	LONEOS	·	1.3 km	MPC · JPL
452845	2006 SA_{69}	—	September 19, 2006	Kitt Peak	Spacewatch	·	1.1 km	MPC · JPL
452846	2006 SE_{79}	—	September 17, 2006	Catalina	CSS	·	2.2 km	MPC · JPL
452847	2006 SN_{79}	—	September 17, 2006	Catalina	CSS	(1547)	1.7 km	MPC · JPL
452848	2006 SE_{116}	—	September 24, 2006	Anderson Mesa	LONEOS	·	3.2 km	MPC · JPL
452849	2006 SG_{140}	—	September 22, 2006	Catalina	CSS	T_{j} (2.9)	6.3 km	MPC · JPL
452850	2006 ST_{140}	—	September 22, 2006	Anderson Mesa	LONEOS	·	2.0 km	MPC · JPL
452851	2006 SV_{142}	—	September 19, 2006	Kitt Peak	Spacewatch	·	1.3 km	MPC · JPL
452852	2006 SE_{149}	—	September 19, 2006	Kitt Peak	Spacewatch	·	1.2 km	MPC · JPL
452853	2006 SE_{160}	—	September 23, 2006	Kitt Peak	Spacewatch	·	1.1 km	MPC · JPL
452854	2006 SP_{173}	—	September 25, 2006	Kitt Peak	Spacewatch	(5)	1.4 km	MPC · JPL
452855	2006 SJ_{202}	—	September 17, 2006	Kitt Peak	Spacewatch	·	1.3 km	MPC · JPL
452856	2006 SS_{204}	—	September 17, 2006	Kitt Peak	Spacewatch	·	1.4 km	MPC · JPL
452857	2006 SP_{213}	—	August 28, 2006	Kitt Peak	Spacewatch	·	1.2 km	MPC · JPL
452858	2006 SX_{213}	—	September 27, 2006	Catalina	CSS	·	1.6 km	MPC · JPL
452859	2006 SW_{240}	—	September 18, 2006	Kitt Peak	Spacewatch	·	1.5 km	MPC · JPL
452860	2006 SX_{255}	—	September 26, 2006	Kitt Peak	Spacewatch	·	1.9 km	MPC · JPL
452861	2006 SP_{256}	—	September 15, 2006	Kitt Peak	Spacewatch	·	1.4 km	MPC · JPL
452862	2006 SU_{276}	—	September 15, 2006	Kitt Peak	Spacewatch	·	1.5 km	MPC · JPL
452863	2006 SQ_{279}	—	September 28, 2006	Catalina	CSS	·	2.3 km	MPC · JPL
452864	2006 SN_{285}	—	September 25, 2006	Kitt Peak	Spacewatch	·	1.3 km	MPC · JPL
452865	2006 SB_{292}	—	September 27, 2006	Catalina	CSS	·	1.9 km	MPC · JPL
452866	2006 SH_{301}	—	September 26, 2006	Mount Lemmon	Mount Lemmon Survey	·	1.4 km	MPC · JPL
452867	2006 SY_{302}	—	September 17, 2006	Catalina	CSS	·	1.6 km	MPC · JPL
452868	2006 SG_{310}	—	September 27, 2006	Kitt Peak	Spacewatch	·	2.3 km	MPC · JPL
452869	2006 SB_{312}	—	September 17, 2006	Kitt Peak	Spacewatch	·	1.5 km	MPC · JPL
452870	2006 SO_{313}	—	September 27, 2006	Kitt Peak	Spacewatch	·	1.9 km	MPC · JPL
452871	2006 SZ_{319}	—	September 27, 2006	Kitt Peak	Spacewatch	·	1.6 km	MPC · JPL
452872	2006 SF_{331}	—	September 15, 2006	Kitt Peak	Spacewatch	·	1.3 km	MPC · JPL
452873	2006 SW_{373}	—	September 16, 2006	Apache Point	A. C. Becker	·	1.4 km	MPC · JPL
452874	2006 SX_{389}	—	September 30, 2006	Apache Point	A. C. Becker	JUN	1.0 km	MPC · JPL
452875	2006 SE_{399}	—	September 17, 2006	Kitt Peak	Spacewatch	·	1.8 km	MPC · JPL
452876	2006 SZ_{402}	—	September 26, 2006	Mount Lemmon	Mount Lemmon Survey	JUN	1.1 km	MPC · JPL
452877	2006 SC_{408}	—	September 27, 2006	Mount Lemmon	Mount Lemmon Survey	·	1.6 km	MPC · JPL
452878	2006 TS_{5}	—	October 2, 2006	Mount Lemmon	Mount Lemmon Survey	·	1.5 km	MPC · JPL
452879	2006 TQ_{31}	—	October 12, 2006	Kitt Peak	Spacewatch	·	1.7 km	MPC · JPL
452880	2006 TC_{34}	—	October 12, 2006	Palomar	NEAT	·	2.0 km	MPC · JPL
452881	2006 TO_{48}	—	September 26, 2006	Mount Lemmon	Mount Lemmon Survey	·	1.4 km	MPC · JPL
452882	2006 TM_{53}	—	October 12, 2006	Kitt Peak	Spacewatch	·	1.6 km	MPC · JPL
452883	2006 TA_{73}	—	October 11, 2006	Palomar	NEAT	·	1.8 km	MPC · JPL
452884	2006 TB_{89}	—	October 13, 2006	Kitt Peak	Spacewatch	GEF	1.2 km	MPC · JPL
452885	2006 TA_{119}	—	October 3, 2006	Apache Point	A. C. Becker	·	1.5 km	MPC · JPL
452886	2006 TK_{123}	—	October 15, 2006	Kitt Peak	Spacewatch	·	1.4 km	MPC · JPL
452887	2006 UG_{3}	—	October 16, 2006	Catalina	CSS	·	1.6 km	MPC · JPL
452888	2006 UR_{27}	—	October 16, 2006	Kitt Peak	Spacewatch	·	1.3 km	MPC · JPL
452889	2006 UW_{41}	—	October 16, 2006	Kitt Peak	Spacewatch	·	1.5 km	MPC · JPL
452890	2006 UY_{43}	—	October 16, 2006	Kitt Peak	Spacewatch	·	1.3 km	MPC · JPL
452891	2006 US_{61}	—	October 19, 2006	Catalina	CSS	JUN	1.8 km	MPC · JPL
452892	2006 UB_{84}	—	October 17, 2006	Mount Lemmon	Mount Lemmon Survey	·	1.5 km	MPC · JPL
452893	2006 US_{85}	—	October 17, 2006	Kitt Peak	Spacewatch	·	1.6 km	MPC · JPL
452894	2006 UU_{102}	—	October 18, 2006	Kitt Peak	Spacewatch	·	1.2 km	MPC · JPL
452895	2006 UD_{109}	—	October 18, 2006	Kitt Peak	Spacewatch	·	1.8 km	MPC · JPL
452896	2006 UL_{155}	—	October 21, 2006	Catalina	CSS	·	1.4 km	MPC · JPL
452897	2006 UZ_{187}	—	October 19, 2006	Catalina	CSS	·	1.7 km	MPC · JPL
452898	2006 UW_{190}	—	October 19, 2006	Catalina	CSS	·	2.4 km	MPC · JPL
452899	2006 UE_{194}	—	October 20, 2006	Kitt Peak	Spacewatch	·	1.2 km	MPC · JPL
452900	2006 UF_{213}	—	October 4, 2006	Mount Lemmon	Mount Lemmon Survey	·	1.9 km	MPC · JPL

== 452901–453000 ==
back to top

Designation			Discovery			Properties		Ref
Permanent	Provisional	Named after	Date	Site	Discoverer(s)	Category	Diam.	Ref
452901	2006 UE_{221}	—	October 1, 2006	Kitt Peak	Spacewatch	·	1.1 km	MPC · JPL
452902	2006 UL_{227}	—	October 20, 2006	Palomar	NEAT	·	1.4 km	MPC · JPL
452903	2006 UE_{259}	—	September 25, 2006	Kitt Peak	Spacewatch	·	1.3 km	MPC · JPL
452904	2006 UB_{281}	—	September 26, 2006	Mount Lemmon	Mount Lemmon Survey	AEO	690 m	MPC · JPL
452905	2006 UE_{335}	—	October 16, 2006	Kitt Peak	Spacewatch	AGN	1.2 km	MPC · JPL
452906	2006 VK_{17}	—	October 21, 2006	Kitt Peak	Spacewatch	·	1.5 km	MPC · JPL
452907	2006 VA_{18}	—	November 9, 2006	Kitt Peak	Spacewatch	·	1.4 km	MPC · JPL
452908	2006 VV_{33}	—	November 11, 2006	Mount Lemmon	Mount Lemmon Survey	·	1.3 km	MPC · JPL
452909	2006 VW_{34}	—	October 22, 2006	Kitt Peak	Spacewatch	·	2.0 km	MPC · JPL
452910	2006 VJ_{37}	—	October 23, 2006	Catalina	CSS	JUN	1.1 km	MPC · JPL
452911	2006 VN_{56}	—	November 11, 2006	Kitt Peak	Spacewatch	·	1.4 km	MPC · JPL
452912	2006 VB_{58}	—	November 11, 2006	Kitt Peak	Spacewatch	NEM	1.9 km	MPC · JPL
452913	2006 VQ_{65}	—	November 11, 2006	Kitt Peak	Spacewatch	·	1.4 km	MPC · JPL
452914	2006 VG_{72}	—	November 11, 2006	Mount Lemmon	Mount Lemmon Survey	·	1.4 km	MPC · JPL
452915	2006 VS_{76}	—	November 12, 2006	Mount Lemmon	Mount Lemmon Survey	·	1.2 km	MPC · JPL
452916	2006 VM_{83}	—	September 25, 2006	Mount Lemmon	Mount Lemmon Survey	·	1.8 km	MPC · JPL
452917	2006 VO_{115}	—	November 14, 2006	Kitt Peak	Spacewatch	·	1.3 km	MPC · JPL
452918	2006 VH_{118}	—	November 14, 2006	Kitt Peak	Spacewatch	AGN	1.2 km	MPC · JPL
452919	2006 VF_{136}	—	November 15, 2006	Kitt Peak	Spacewatch	HOF	2.4 km	MPC · JPL
452920	2006 VA_{145}	—	November 15, 2006	Catalina	CSS	·	1.8 km	MPC · JPL
452921	2006 VG_{148}	—	October 22, 2006	Mount Lemmon	Mount Lemmon Survey	·	2.2 km	MPC · JPL
452922	2006 VM_{148}	—	November 15, 2006	Mount Lemmon	Mount Lemmon Survey	·	1.5 km	MPC · JPL
452923	2006 VU_{148}	—	November 13, 2006	Catalina	CSS	GEF	1.6 km	MPC · JPL
452924	2006 VJ_{173}	—	November 11, 2006	Kitt Peak	Spacewatch	·	2.0 km	MPC · JPL
452925	2006 WK_{39}	—	November 16, 2006	Kitt Peak	Spacewatch	·	1.5 km	MPC · JPL
452926	2006 WD_{47}	—	November 16, 2006	Kitt Peak	Spacewatch	·	1.4 km	MPC · JPL
452927	2006 WX_{57}	—	November 11, 2006	Kitt Peak	Spacewatch	·	1.8 km	MPC · JPL
452928	2006 WQ_{73}	—	October 21, 2006	Kitt Peak	Spacewatch	AGN	950 m	MPC · JPL
452929	2006 WK_{83}	—	October 23, 2006	Mount Lemmon	Mount Lemmon Survey	·	1.7 km	MPC · JPL
452930	2006 WB_{87}	—	November 18, 2006	Socorro	LINEAR	·	2.6 km	MPC · JPL
452931	2006 WM_{89}	—	November 18, 2006	Kitt Peak	Spacewatch	·	1.9 km	MPC · JPL
452932	2006 WM_{102}	—	November 11, 2006	Kitt Peak	Spacewatch	AEO	800 m	MPC · JPL
452933	2006 WG_{103}	—	November 11, 2006	Kitt Peak	Spacewatch	·	1.6 km	MPC · JPL
452934	2006 WM_{115}	—	November 20, 2006	Socorro	LINEAR	·	1.7 km	MPC · JPL
452935	2006 WQ_{138}	—	October 22, 2006	Catalina	CSS	·	1.4 km	MPC · JPL
452936	2006 WY_{143}	—	October 31, 2006	Mount Lemmon	Mount Lemmon Survey	·	1.9 km	MPC · JPL
452937	2006 WN_{178}	—	November 24, 2006	Kitt Peak	Spacewatch	·	1.6 km	MPC · JPL
452938	2006 WB_{195}	—	November 29, 2006	Socorro	LINEAR	EUN	1.4 km	MPC · JPL
452939	2006 XH_{6}	—	December 8, 2006	Palomar	NEAT	·	2.5 km	MPC · JPL
452940	2006 XQ_{10}	—	December 9, 2006	Kitt Peak	Spacewatch	·	2.0 km	MPC · JPL
452941	2006 XT_{11}	—	December 10, 2006	Kitt Peak	Spacewatch	·	2.6 km	MPC · JPL
452942	2006 XU_{24}	—	October 17, 2006	Mount Lemmon	Mount Lemmon Survey	·	1.2 km	MPC · JPL
452943	2006 XA_{30}	—	December 13, 2006	Mount Lemmon	Mount Lemmon Survey	·	2.1 km	MPC · JPL
452944	2006 XY_{33}	—	December 11, 2006	Kitt Peak	Spacewatch	·	2.1 km	MPC · JPL
452945	2006 XF_{40}	—	November 23, 2006	Kitt Peak	Spacewatch	·	1.5 km	MPC · JPL
452946	2006 XU_{45}	—	November 27, 2006	Socorro	LINEAR	·	1.6 km	MPC · JPL
452947	2006 XG_{47}	—	November 27, 2006	Kitt Peak	Spacewatch	·	2.0 km	MPC · JPL
452948	2006 XZ_{48}	—	December 13, 2006	Socorro	LINEAR	·	2.5 km	MPC · JPL
452949	2006 XM_{54}	—	December 11, 2006	Kitt Peak	Spacewatch	·	2.0 km	MPC · JPL
452950	2006 XX_{72}	—	December 13, 2006	Mount Lemmon	Mount Lemmon Survey	·	1.6 km	MPC · JPL
452951	2006 XG_{73}	—	December 15, 2006	Kitt Peak	Spacewatch	·	1.8 km	MPC · JPL
452952	2007 AC	—	January 6, 2007	Pla D'Arguines	R. Ferrando	·	2.1 km	MPC · JPL
452953	2007 AY	—	November 25, 2006	Mount Lemmon	Mount Lemmon Survey	EUN	1.4 km	MPC · JPL
452954	2007 AZ_{6}	—	December 13, 2006	Kitt Peak	Spacewatch	·	2.6 km	MPC · JPL
452955	2007 AZ_{16}	—	January 15, 2007	Catalina	CSS	·	2.2 km	MPC · JPL
452956	2007 AP_{17}	—	January 15, 2007	Anderson Mesa	LONEOS	JUN	1.3 km	MPC · JPL
452957	2007 BN_{6}	—	December 26, 2006	Kitt Peak	Spacewatch	·	2.3 km	MPC · JPL
452958	2007 BJ_{33}	—	January 24, 2007	Mount Lemmon	Mount Lemmon Survey	·	1.9 km	MPC · JPL
452959	2007 BD_{44}	—	November 27, 2006	Mount Lemmon	Mount Lemmon Survey	·	1.9 km	MPC · JPL
452960	2007 BO_{76}	—	January 17, 2007	Kitt Peak	Spacewatch	·	2.0 km	MPC · JPL
452961	2007 CN_{6}	—	December 24, 2006	Kitt Peak	Spacewatch	·	1.7 km	MPC · JPL
452962	2007 CR_{43}	—	February 8, 2007	Kitt Peak	Spacewatch	·	1.7 km	MPC · JPL
452963	2007 CR_{60}	—	November 25, 2006	Mount Lemmon	Mount Lemmon Survey	·	3.0 km	MPC · JPL
452964	2007 CT_{62}	—	November 1, 2006	Mount Lemmon	Mount Lemmon Survey	JUN	1.3 km	MPC · JPL
452965	2007 CB_{72}	—	February 14, 2007	Mauna Kea	Mauna Kea	·	1.7 km	MPC · JPL
452966	2007 DB_{25}	—	February 17, 2007	Kitt Peak	Spacewatch	·	1.4 km	MPC · JPL
452967	2007 DM_{28}	—	February 17, 2007	Kitt Peak	Spacewatch	L5	7.8 km	MPC · JPL
452968	2007 DA_{47}	—	February 21, 2007	Socorro	LINEAR	·	3.4 km	MPC · JPL
452969	2007 DJ_{47}	—	February 13, 2007	Socorro	LINEAR	PHO	1.3 km	MPC · JPL
452970	2007 DU_{71}	—	February 21, 2007	Kitt Peak	Spacewatch	EOS	1.7 km	MPC · JPL
452971	2007 DG_{89}	—	February 9, 2007	Kitt Peak	Spacewatch	·	1.9 km	MPC · JPL
452972	2007 DF_{116}	—	February 16, 2007	Catalina	CSS	·	1.8 km	MPC · JPL
452973	2007 EW_{14}	—	March 9, 2007	Mount Lemmon	Mount Lemmon Survey	·	1.4 km	MPC · JPL
452974	2007 EH_{15}	—	February 21, 2007	Mount Lemmon	Mount Lemmon Survey	EMA	3.0 km	MPC · JPL
452975	2007 EG_{64}	—	March 10, 2007	Mount Lemmon	Mount Lemmon Survey	·	860 m	MPC · JPL
452976	2007 ES_{131}	—	March 9, 2007	Mount Lemmon	Mount Lemmon Survey	VER	3.3 km	MPC · JPL
452977	2007 EW_{152}	—	March 12, 2007	Mount Lemmon	Mount Lemmon Survey	·	2.5 km	MPC · JPL
452978	2007 ED_{175}	—	March 14, 2007	Kitt Peak	Spacewatch	·	2.6 km	MPC · JPL
452979	2007 EF_{175}	—	March 14, 2007	Kitt Peak	Spacewatch	·	2.1 km	MPC · JPL
452980	2007 EM_{175}	—	March 14, 2007	Kitt Peak	Spacewatch	·	2.4 km	MPC · JPL
452981	2007 EW_{220}	—	March 13, 2007	Kitt Peak	Spacewatch	·	1.7 km	MPC · JPL
452982	2007 ES_{223}	—	March 11, 2007	Catalina	CSS	·	2.0 km	MPC · JPL
452983	2007 FY_{10}	—	March 16, 2007	Kitt Peak	Spacewatch	·	1.6 km	MPC · JPL
452984	2007 FQ_{19}	—	March 20, 2007	Mount Lemmon	Mount Lemmon Survey	EOS	1.4 km	MPC · JPL
452985	2007 FZ_{31}	—	March 15, 2007	Kitt Peak	Spacewatch	·	2.0 km	MPC · JPL
452986	2007 FH_{50}	—	March 25, 2007	Mount Lemmon	Mount Lemmon Survey	·	1.7 km	MPC · JPL
452987	2007 GE_{1}	—	April 6, 2007	Bergisch Gladbach	W. Bickel	·	1.3 km	MPC · JPL
452988	2007 GQ_{17}	—	April 11, 2007	Kitt Peak	Spacewatch	·	2.1 km	MPC · JPL
452989	2007 GE_{18}	—	April 11, 2007	Kitt Peak	Spacewatch	·	2.6 km	MPC · JPL
452990	2007 GF_{40}	—	April 14, 2007	Kitt Peak	Spacewatch	·	2.0 km	MPC · JPL
452991	2007 GE_{51}	—	April 15, 2007	Kitt Peak	Spacewatch	·	2.9 km	MPC · JPL
452992	2007 GK_{65}	—	April 15, 2007	Kitt Peak	Spacewatch	·	680 m	MPC · JPL
452993	2007 GJ_{73}	—	April 15, 2007	Catalina	CSS	·	750 m	MPC · JPL
452994	2007 GS_{73}	—	March 26, 2007	Catalina	CSS	·	4.5 km	MPC · JPL
452995	2007 HZ_{11}	—	April 18, 2007	Mount Lemmon	Mount Lemmon Survey	VER	3.0 km	MPC · JPL
452996	2007 HD_{60}	—	March 16, 2007	Mount Lemmon	Mount Lemmon Survey	·	2.6 km	MPC · JPL
452997	2007 HD_{61}	—	October 29, 2005	Kitt Peak	Spacewatch	·	730 m	MPC · JPL
452998	2007 HN_{68}	—	March 16, 2007	Kitt Peak	Spacewatch	·	1.8 km	MPC · JPL
452999	2007 HG_{88}	—	April 19, 2007	Mount Lemmon	Mount Lemmon Survey	·	2.6 km	MPC · JPL
453000	2007 HW_{94}	—	April 18, 2007	Kitt Peak	Spacewatch	·	2.3 km	MPC · JPL

back to top

== Meaning of names ==
As minor planet discoveries are confirmed, they are given a permanent number by the IAU's Minor Planet Center (MPC), and the discoverers can then submit names for them, following the IAU's naming conventions. The list below concerns those minor planets in the specified number-range that have received names, and explains the meanings of those names.

Official naming citations of newly named small Solar System bodies are approved and published in a bulletin by IAU's Working Group for Small Bodies Nomenclature (WGSBN). Before May 2021, citations were published in MPC's Minor Planet Circulars for many decades. Recent citations can also be found on the JPL Small-Body Database (SBDB). Until his death in 2016, German astronomer Lutz D. Schmadel compiled these citations into the Dictionary of Minor Planet Names (DMP) and regularly updated the collection.

Based on Paul Herget's The Names of the Minor Planets, Schmadel also researched the unclear origin of numerous asteroids, most of which had been named prior to World War II. This article incorporates text from this source, which is in the public domain: SBDB New namings may only be added to this list below after official publication as the preannouncement of names is condemned. The WGSBN publishes a comprehensive guideline for the naming rules of non-cometary small Solar System bodies.

Named minor planet	Provisional	This minor planet was named for...	Ref · Catalog
452307 Manawydan	1997 XV_{11}	Manawydan fab Llŷr, a scholar, magician and peaceful man in Welsh mythology	JPL · 452307
