= Franck Marchis =

American astronomer

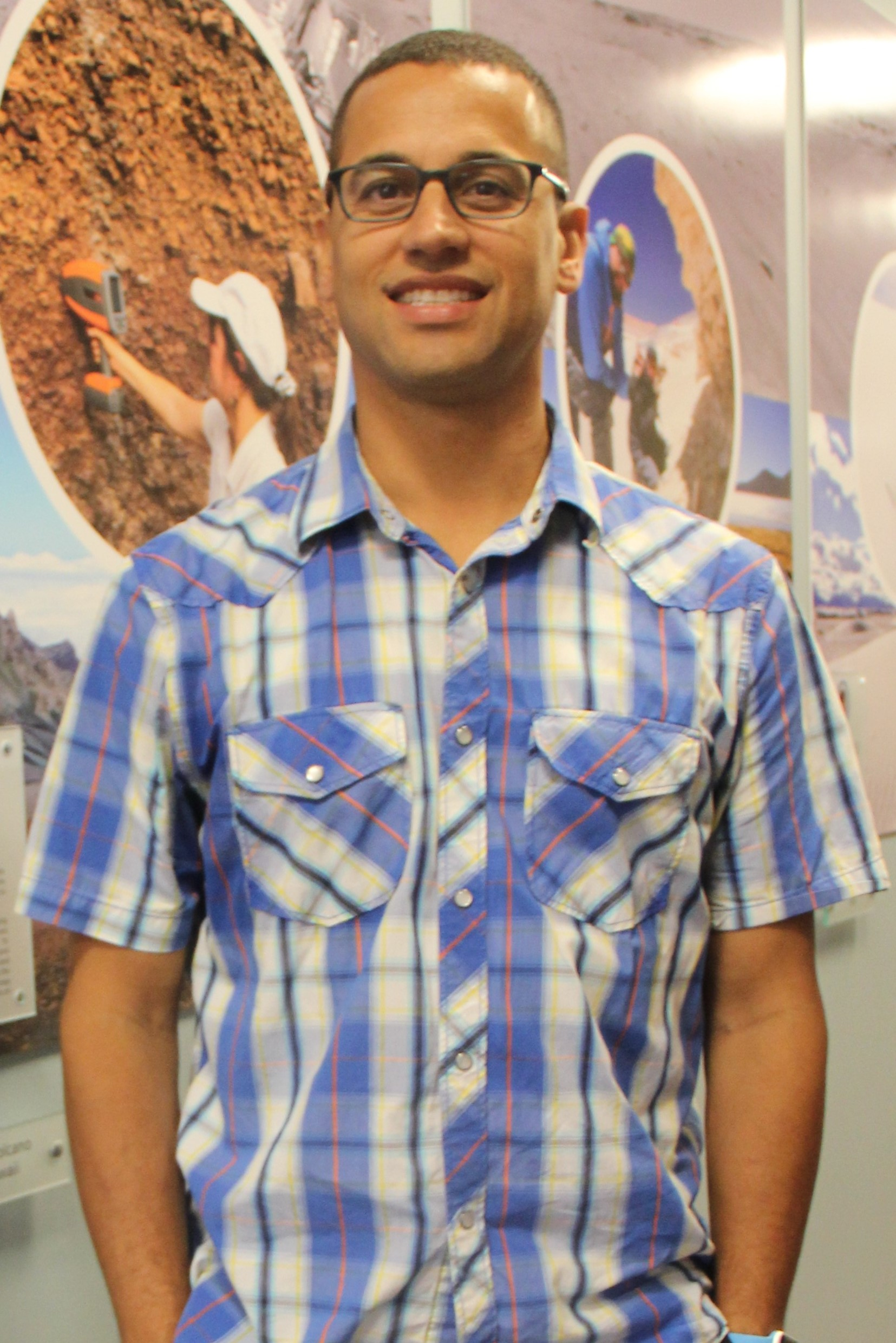
- Marchis at the SETI Institute (2017)
- Born: April 6, 1973 (age 53); Caen, France
- Education: M.S. University of Toulouse (1996); Ph.D. University of Toulouse (2000)
- Occupations: Astronomer, planetary scientist, entrepreneur
- Employer(s): SkyMapper; SETI Institute; Unistellar

Franck Marchis (born April 6, 1973, in Caen, France) is a planetary astronomer, science entrepreneur, and co-founder and CEO of SkyMapper, a company building a global network of connected telescopes and intelligent all-sky sensors. SkyMapper's mission is to observe "All the Sky, All the Time," creating a distributed optical network for astronomy, satellite tracking, transient-event detection, airspace monitoring, and scientific research.

== Background ==
He is also a Senior Astronomer and Director of Citizen Science at the Carl Sagan Center of the SETI Institute. After earning his Ph.D. in planetary science from the University of Toulouse, France, he moved to the United States in 2000. For more than two decades, his research has focused on small bodies in the solar system, particularly asteroids with moons, using ground-based telescopes equipped with adaptive optics. He has also contributed to the development of advanced adaptive-optics systems for 8–10-meter telescopes and future Extremely Large Telescopes, as well as to research on directly imaged exoplanets, optical technosignatures, and time-domain astronomy.

Marchis has played a leading role in expanding public participation in scientific discovery. He is a co-founder and former Chief Scientific Officer of Unistellar, where he helped create a global community of thousands of citizen astronomers using connected digital telescopes. His current work at SkyMapper builds on that experience by combining distributed observing networks, edge artificial intelligence, autonomous telescope operations, and verifiable scientific data. He is also involved in LaserSETI, a global project designed to search the entire sky for brief optical signals that could indicate extraterrestrial technology.

== Scientific and advisory roles ==
He has served on numerous scientific and advisory bodies, including the Gemini Planet Imager Steering Committee, the Thirty Meter Telescope Science Definition Team, the Project Blue Advisory Board, and the International Academy of Astronautics SETI Permanent Committee. He is also an affiliated astronomer at the Observatoire de Paris and an associate researcher at the Laboratoire d'Astrophysique de Marseille.

== Awards and recognition ==
An author or co-author of more than 200 peer-reviewed scientific publications, Marchis has mentored numerous students and regularly contributes to documentaries, films, and public programs in English, French, and Spanish. In recognition of his discovery of the first known triple-asteroid system in 2005, the asteroid (6639) was named "Marchis." He was elected a Fellow of the California Academy of Sciences in 2023 and received the Carl Sagan Center Director's Award in 2024.

== Discovery of companions of asteroids ==
Marchis exploited the high-resolution capabilities offered by adaptive optics from groundbased telescope to survey hundreds of main belt asteroids and Trojans. Together with his team, they announced the discovery of the first triple asteroid system in August 2005 (87 Sylvia), and the first measurement of a Trojan bulk-density in February 2006 (617 Patroclus). Both discoveries were published in Nature journal (ref [2], [3])

In July 2006, Marchis and his team announced the discovery of a moonlet companion around 624 Hektor using the Keck Laser guide star AO system (ref [4]). This is the first multiple system in the L4 swarm and the first moonlet companion in the Trojan discovered.

The second triple system orbiting in the main-belt was discovered by the same team and announced in March 2007. Subsequent analysis of VLT-NACO images taken in Jan. 2004 revealed the presence of a second 6-km size moonlet orbiting around (45) Eugenia. Since 1999, this system was known to have a large moonlet, called Petit-Prince (~15 km) orbiting at 1200 km. ref[6]. In December 2014, the team led by Bin Yang re-observed a binary asteroid system 130 Elektra with the new Extreme AO system SPHERE of the VLT UT4 telescope and detected a smaller and closer satellite not yet seen on previous AO data.

Multiple Asteroids discovered: 12
satellite name, system name	date of discovery	technique
S/2016 (107) 1 (107 Camilla II)	August 7, 2016	VLT Sphere AO
S/2014 (130) 1 (130 Elektra II)	December 6, 2014	VLT Sphere AO
S/2009 (93) 2 (93 Minerva II)	August 31, 2009	Keck AO
S/2009 (93) 1 (93 Minerva I)	August 31, 2009	Keck AO
Cleoselene (216 Kleopatra II)	September 24, 2008	Keck AO
Alexhelios (216 Kleopatra I)	September 24, 2008	Keck AO
S/2008 (160091 2000 OL67) 1	February 19, 2008	HST
S/2008 (119067 2001 KP76) 1	February 19, 2008	HST
S/2007 (3749) 1 (3749 Balam II)	March 19, 2008	Lightcurve
S/2004 (45) 1 (45 Eugenia II)	March 7, 2007	VLT NACO AO
Skamandrios (624 Hektor I)	July 21, 2006	Keck AO
Remus (87 Sylvia II)	August 15, 2005	VLT NACO AO

== Volcanic activity of Io ==
Using high imaging capability available on ground-based telescopes equipped with adaptive optics systems, F. Marchis and his team monitor and study the exotic volcanism of Io, Galilean satellite of Jupiter. In February 2001, they witnessed the most energetic eruption ever seen in the Solar System. Surt volcano, located on the north hemisphere of Io, was then starting an extremely active eruption. The observed energy indicates the presence of a vigorous, high-temperature volcanic eruption. The kind of eruption to produce this thermal signature has incandescent fire fountains of molten lava which are kilometers high, propelled at great speed out of the ground by expanding gases, accompanied by extensive lava flows on the surface. The Surt eruption appears to cover an area of 1,900 square kilometers, which is larger than the city of Los Angeles and even larger than London [5].
