= 3749 Balam =

Asteroid

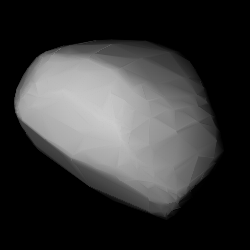
- Shape model of Balam from its lightcurve

Discovery
- Discovered by: E. Bowell
- Discovery site: Anderson Mesa Stn.
- Discovery date: 24 January 1982

Designations
- Pronunciation: /ˈbeɪləm/
- Named after: David Balam (Canadian astronomer)
- Alternative designations: 1982 BG_{1} · 1954 XM; 1962 ED · 1974 YO
- Minor planet category: main-belt · Flora

Orbital characteristics
- Epoch 4 September 2017 (JD 2458000.5)
- Uncertainty parameter 0
- Observation arc: 61.66 yr (22,521 days)
- Aphelion: 2.4818 AU
- Perihelion: 1.9920 AU
- Semi-major axis: 2.2369 AU
- Eccentricity: 0.1095
- Orbital period (sidereal): 3.35 yr (1,222 days)
- Mean anomaly: 254.23°
- Mean motion: 0° 17^{m} 40.56^{s} / day
- Inclination: 5.3801°
- Longitude of ascending node: 295.71°
- Argument of perihelion: 173.74°
- Known satellites: 2 (⌀: 1.66 km; 1.84 km)

Physical characteristics
- Mean diameter: 4.1±0.5 km (primary); 4.663±0.21 km (effective); 4.7±0.5 km (effective)
- Mass: (5.09±0.2)×10^{14} kg
- Mean density: 2.61±0.45 g/cm^{3}
- Synodic rotation period: 2.805 h (Note: Pravec-2012web, rotation period of 2.80478±0.00005 with an amplitude in brightness variation of 0.1 magnitude. Summary figures for (3749) Balam at Lightcurve Database)
- Geometric albedo: 0.16; 0.277±0.096; 0.355±0.067
- Spectral type: Sq
- Absolute magnitude (H): 13.3; 13.4; 13.66

3749 Balam /ˈbeɪləm/ is a stony Flora asteroid and rare trinary system orbiting in the inner regions of asteroid belt. It also forms a secured asteroid pair with sub-kilometer sized asteroid (312497) 2009 BR60. Balam was discovered on 24 January 1982, by American astronomer Edward Bowell at Lowell's Anderson Mesa Station near Flagstaff, Arizona, and received the prov. designation 1982 BG_{1}. It was named after Canadian astronomer David Balam. Balam measures approximately 4.1 kilometers (2.5 miles) in diameter. Its two minor-planet moons have an estimated diameter of 1.66 and 1.84 kilometers, respectively.

== Orbit and classification ==
Balam is a member of the Flora family, a very large group of stony asteroids in the inner main-belt. It orbits the Sun in the inner main-belt at a distance of 2.0–2.5 AU once every 3 years and 4 months (1,222 days). Its orbit has an eccentricity of 0.11 and an inclination of 5° with respect to the ecliptic.

== Naming ==
It is named after the Canadian astronomer David Balam, principal observer at Victoria's Climenhaga Observatory in British Columbia. The approved naming citation was published by the Minor Planet Center on 31 May 1988 (M.P.C. 13178).

== Physical characteristics ==
The S-type asteroid has an albedo of 0.16. The body's rotation around its axis has been measured several times by different lightcurve observations with a concurring period of 2.8 hours.

=== Triple asteroid ===
==== Outer satellite ====
On 13 February 2002, the discovery of a minor-planet moon, provisionally designated S/2002 (3749) 1, was announced by a team of researchers from SwRI, UA, JPL and OSUG, using the Gemini North Telescope on Mauna Kea in Hawaii. It has an estimated diameter of 1.84 kilometers. It orbits 289±13 km away in 61±10 days, with a high orbital eccentricity of ~ 0.9. The distant and highly eccentric orbit of S/2002 (3749) 1 suggests that it was likely captured by Balam.

Being such a small primary body in the inner main belt with a separation of over 100 primary radii, S/2002 (3749) 1 is the most loosely bound binary known. Balam has a Hill sphere with a radius of about 1,500 kilometers.

==== Inner satellite ====
In March 2008, Franck Marchis discovered another satellite from eclipses seen in Balam's light curve, making Balam a trinary asteroid. The inner satellite, which does not have a provisional designation, has a derived diameter of 1.66 kilometers, based on diameter-ratio of 0.42±0.03 with its primary.

Other known trinary asteroids include 45 Eugenia, 87 Sylvia, 93 Minerva, 107 Camilla, 130 Elektra and 216 Kleopatra.

=== Asteroid pair ===
Balam forms an asteroid pair with (312497) 2009 BR60. Asteroid pairs are on highly similar heliocentric orbits. At some point in the past, the pair of asteroids became gravitationally unbound due to rotational fission induced by the YORP-effect or from a collisional breakup of the parent body. After the discovery of Balam's two satellites by Bill Merline (inner moon) and Franck Marchis (outer moon) in 2002 and 2008, respectively, Czech physicist David Vokrouhlický identified the unbound secondary in 2009. Based on backward orbit integrations, it is thought that Balam and 2009 BR_{60} form a secured asteroid pair that became separated approximately 400,000 years ago.
