= Binary asteroid =

System of two asteroids orbiting their common center of mass

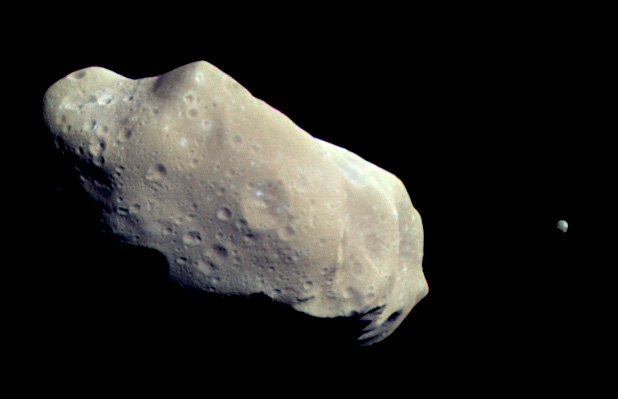
Binary asteroid 243 Ida with its small minor-planet moon, Dactyl, as seen by Galileo

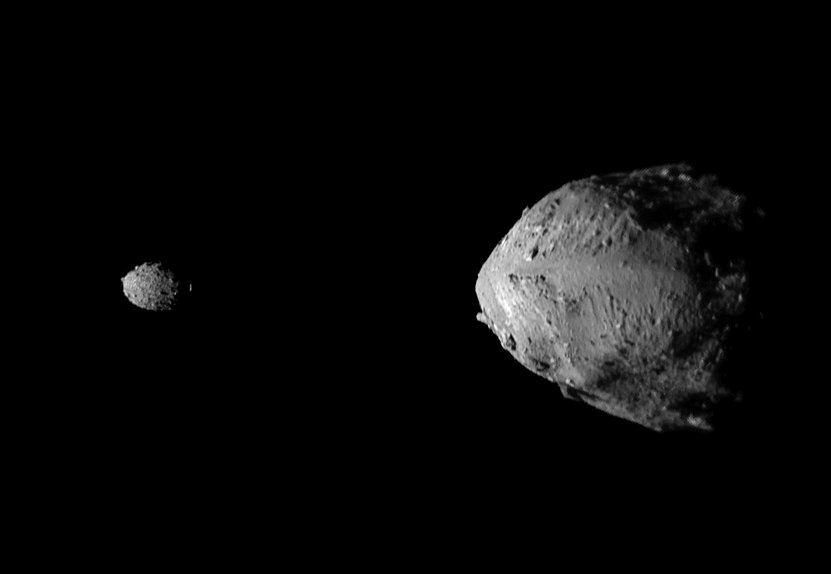
Binary near-Earth asteroid 65803 Didymos and its moon Dimorphos imaged by the Double Asteroid Redirection Test spacecraft

A binary asteroid is a system of two asteroids orbiting their common barycenter. The binary nature of 243 Ida was discovered when the Galileo spacecraft flew by the asteroid in 1993. Since then numerous binary asteroids and several triple asteroids have been detected.

The mass ratio of the two components – called the "primary" and "secondary" of a binary system – is an important characteristic. Most binary asteroids have a large mass ratio, i.e. a relatively small satellite in orbit around the main component. Systems with one or more small moons – also called "companions" or simply "satellites" – include 87 Sylvia, 107 Camilla and 45 Eugenia (all triples), 121 Hermione, 130 Elektra (a quadruple), 22 Kalliope, 283 Emma, 379 Huenna, 243 Ida and 4337 Arecibo (in order of decreasing primary size). Some binary systems have a mass ratio near unity, i.e., two components of similar mass. They include 90 Antiope, 2006 VW_{139}, 2017 YE5 and 69230 Hermes, with average component diameters of 86, 1.8, 0.9 and 0.8 km, respectively.

In August 2024 Gaia reported 352 new binary asteroid candidates.

== Description ==
Several theories have been posited to explain the formation of binary-asteroid systems. Many systems have significant macro-porosity (a "rubble-pile" interior). The satellites orbiting large main-belt asteroids such as 22 Kalliope, 45 Eugenia or 87 Sylvia may have formed by disruption of a parent body after impact or fission after an oblique impact. Trans-Neptunian binaries may have formed during the formation of the Solar System by mutual capture or three-body interaction. Near-Earth asteroids, which orbit in the inner part of the Solar System, most likely form by spin-up and mass shedding, likely as a result of the YORP effect. Numerical simulations suggest that when solar energy spins a “rubble pile” asteroid to a sufficiently fast rate by the YORP effect, material is thrown from the asteroid's equator. This process also exposes fresh material at the poles of the asteroid.

== Gallery ==
Time-lapse video of binary main-belt comet 2006 VW_{139} (288P)

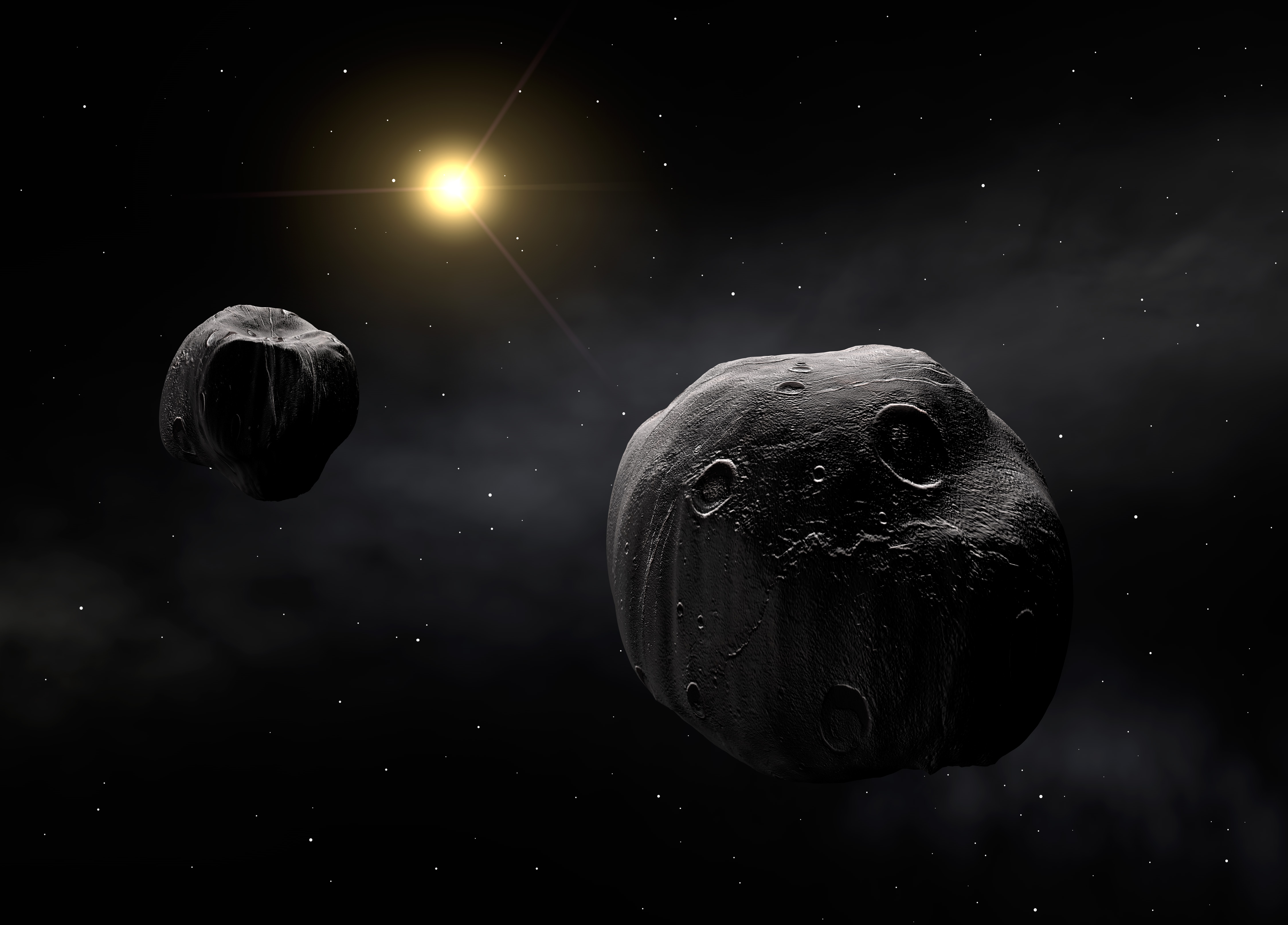
Artist's impression of the double asteroid 90 Antiope

== See also ==
- Minor-planet moon § List of minor planets with moons
- Subsatellite, also known as Moonmoon – Satellite that orbits a natural satellite
- Contact binary (small Solar System body)
- Triple asteroids (153591) 2001 SN263 and (136617) 1994 CC
