= 2578 Saint-Exupéry =

Asteroid

Discovery
- Discovered by: T. Smirnova
- Discovery site: Crimean Astrophysical Obs.
- Discovery date: 2 November 1975

Designations
- Named after: Antoine de Saint-Exupéry (French writer)
- Alternative designations: 1975 VW_{3} · 1952 HG_{2} 1980 TA_{1}
- Minor planet category: main-belt · (outer); Eos

Orbital characteristics
- Epoch 4 September 2017 (JD 2458000.5)
- Uncertainty parameter 0
- Observation arc: 64.61 yr (23,599 days)
- Aphelion: 3.2935 AU
- Perihelion: 2.7101 AU
- Semi-major axis: 3.0018 AU
- Eccentricity: 0.0972
- Orbital period (sidereal): 5.20 yr (1,900 days)
- Mean anomaly: 17.255°
- Mean motion: 0° 11^{m} 22.2^{s} / day
- Inclination: 10.571°
- Longitude of ascending node: 55.704°
- Argument of perihelion: 336.25°

Physical characteristics
- Dimensions: 17.014±0.485; 22±9 km (calculated)
- Geometric albedo: 0.168±0.039
- Absolute magnitude (H): 11.5

2578 Saint-Exupéry, provisional designation 1975 VW_{3}, is an Eoan asteroid from the outer region of the asteroid belt, approximately 17 kilometers in diameter. It was discovered by Russian astronomer Tamara Smirnova at the Crimean Astrophysical Observatory in Nauchnyj on 2 November 1975, and named after French aviator and writer Antoine de Saint-Exupéry.

== Classification and orbit ==
Saint-Exupéry is a member the Eos family (606), the largest asteroid family of the outer main belt consisting of nearly 10,000 known members. The asteroid orbits the Sun at a distance of 2.7–3.3 AU once every 5 years and 2 months (1,900 days). Its orbit has an eccentricity of 0.10 and an inclination of 11° with respect to the ecliptic.

The asteroid's was first identified as 1952 HG_{2} at McDonald Observatory in Texas. One month later, it was also observed at the Palomar Observatory in May 1952. Its observation arc begins by 23 years prior to its official discovery observation at Nauchnyj.

== Physical characteristics ==
According to the survey carried out by NASA's Wide-field Infrared Survey Explorer with its subsequent NEOWISE mission, Saint-Exupéry measures 17.0 kilometers in diameter and its surface has an albedo of 0.168. Based on its absolute magnitude of 11.5, its generic diameter is between 13 and 30 kilometers, assuming an albedo in the range of 0.05 to 0.25.

As of 2017, Saint-Exupéry's effective composition, rotation period and shape remain unknown.

== Naming ==
The minor planet was named in honour of French aviator and writer Antoine de Saint-Exupéry (1900–1944). The name also alludes to Saint-Exupéry's best-known character, The Little Prince, who lives on an asteroid.

In the book, the prince's asteroid also has a unique code: B612 (which does not match this minor planet's provisional designation). However, there is another asteroid called 46610 Bésixdouze, which is French for "B-six-twelve" (B612 in hexadecimal notation equals 46610).

The official naming citation was published by the Minor Planet Center on 11 July 1987 (M.P.C. 12012).

== See also ==
- 5540 Smirnova
- Petit-Prince (moon), asteroid moon of 45 Eugenia
