= 107 Camilla =

Asteroid with 2 moons

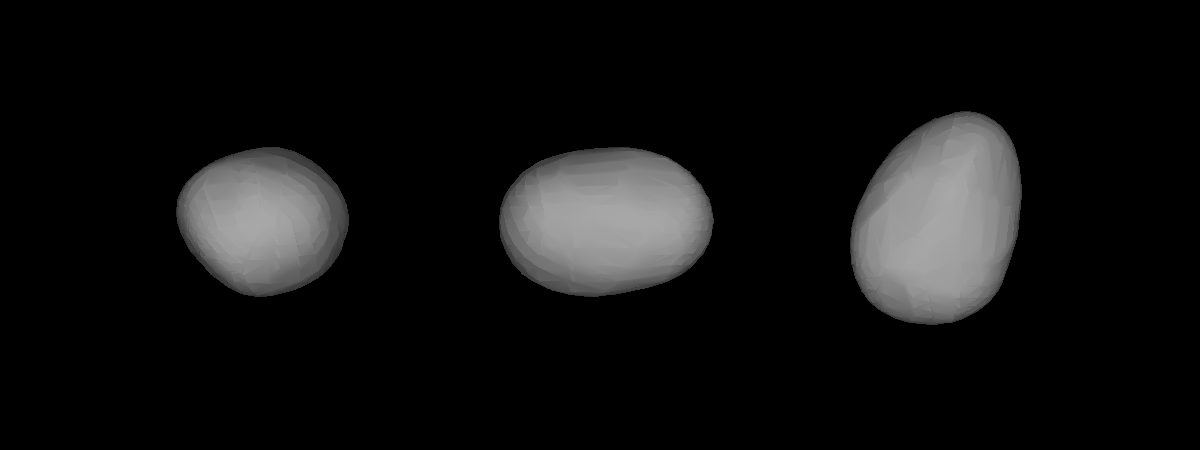
- Lightcurve-based 3-D model of Camilla

Discovery
- Discovered by: N. R. Pogson
- Discovery site: Madras Obs.
- Discovery date: 17 November 1868

Designations
- Pronunciation: /kəˈmɪlə/
- Named after: Camilla (Roman mythology)
- Alternative designations: A868 WA, 1893 QA; 1938 OG, 1949 HD_{1}
- Minor planet category: main-belt · (outer); Sylvia · Cybele
- Adjectives: Camillian or Camillean, /kəˈmɪliən/

Orbital characteristics
- Epoch 23 March 2018 (JD 2458200.5)
- Uncertainty parameter 0
- Observation arc: 149.17 yr (54,485 d)
- Aphelion: 3.7202 AU
- Perihelion: 3.2622 AU
- Semi-major axis: 3.4912 AU
- Eccentricity: 0.0656
- Orbital period (sidereal): 6.52 yr (2,383 d)
- Mean anomaly: 265.91°
- Mean motion: 0° 9^{m} 3.96^{s} / day
- Inclination: 10.001°
- Longitude of ascending node: 172.61°
- Argument of perihelion: 306.77°
- Known satellites: 2

Physical characteristics
- Dimensions: (340 × 249 × 197) ± 12 km
- Mean diameter: 254±12 km
- Volume: (8.55±1.21)×10^{6} km^{3}
- Mass: (11.2±0.1)×10^{18} kg
- Mean density: 1.28±0.04 g/cm^{3}
- Synodic rotation period: 4.843927±0.00004 h
- Pole ecliptic longitude: 68.0° ± 9.0°
- Pole ecliptic latitude: 58.3° ± 7.0°
- Geometric albedo: 0.059±0.005 (composite estimate)
- Spectral type: X (SMASS); C (Tholen); P (WISE); B–V = 0.705; U–B = 0.298
- Apparent magnitude: 11.53
- Absolute magnitude (H): 7.08; 7.1±0.02

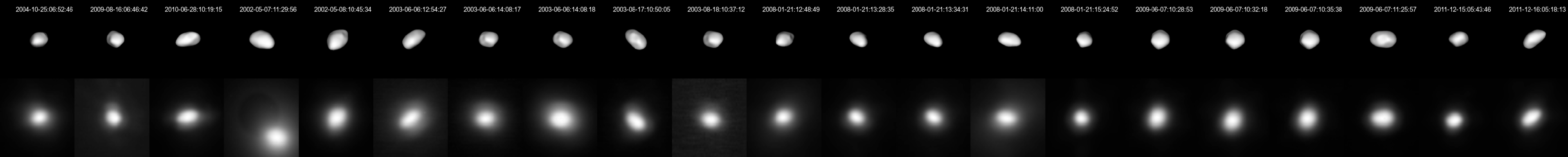
A lightcurve model of the asteroid on the top and an image of the asteroid on the bottom, with at least one of its moons barely visible in the first few images

107 Camilla is one of the largest asteroids from the outermost edge of the asteroid belt, approximately 250 kilometers (160 miles) in diameter. It is a member of the Sylvia family and located within the Cybele group. It was discovered on 17 November 1868, by English astronomer Norman Pogson at Madras Observatory, India, and named after Camilla, Queen of the Volsci in Roman mythology. The X-type asteroid is a rare triple asteroid with two minor-planet moons discovered in 2001 and 2016, respectively. It is elongated in shape and has a short rotation period of 4.8 hours.

== Physical characteristics ==
Camilla has a very dark surface and primitive carbonaceous composition.

A large number of rotational lightcurves of have been obtained from photometric observations since the 1980s. Best rated results gave a short rotation period of 4.844 hours with a brightness amplitude between 0.32 and 0.53 magnitude. (Note: Pietschnig (2011) web: Photometric observations from 28 March 2007. Rotation period 4.844±0.003 hours with a brightness amplitude of 0.47 magnitude. Quality code of 3. Summary figures at Collaborative Asteroid Lightcurve Link (CALL))

Lightcurve analysis indicates that Camilla's pole most likely points towards ecliptic coordinates (β, λ) = (+51°, 72°) with a 10° uncertainty, which gives it an axial tilt of 29°. Follow-up modeling of photometric data gave similar results.

=== Diameter and albedo ===
10μ radiometric data collected from Kitt Peak in 1975 gave a first diameter estimate of 209 km. According to the space-based surveys carried out by the Japanese Akari satellite, the Infrared Astronomical Satellite IRAS and the NEOWISE mission of NASA's Wide-field Infrared Survey Explorer, as well as observations by the Keck Observatory and photometric modeling, Camilla measures between 185 and 247 kilometers in diameter and its surface has an albedo between 0.160 and 0.294.

== Satellites ==
Camilla is the 6th triple asteroid that has been discovered in the asteroid belt, after 87 Sylvia, 45 Eugenia, 216 Kleopatra, 93 Minerva and 130 Elektra (a quaternary).

=== Outer satellite ===
S/2001 (107) 1
Discovery
- Discovered by: A. Storrs, F. Vilas, R. Landis, E. Wells, C. Woods, B. Zellner, and M. Gaffey
- Discovery date: 1 March 2001

Orbital characteristics
- Observation arc: 5642 days
- Semi-major axis: 1247.8±1.3 km
- Eccentricity: 0.000±0.004
- Orbital period (sidereal): 3.71234±0.00001 d
- Inclination: 16.0°±0.8°

Physical characteristics
- Mean diameter: 12.7±3.5 km, assuming equal albedos and D_{Camilla} = 254 km
- Mass: ~1.5×10^{15} kg (Note: Assuming a similar density to the primary.)
- Absolute magnitude (H): 13.18

On 1 March 2001, a minor-planet moon of Camilla was found by A. Storrs, F. Vilas, R. Landis, E. Wells, C. Woods, B. Zellner, and M. Gaffey using the Hubble Space Telescope. It has the provisional designation S/2001 (107) 1 and has not received an official name.

Later observations in September 2005 with the Very Large Telescope (VLT) allowed the determination of an orbit. In addition to the data in the infobox at right, the inclination was found to be 3 ± 1° with respect to an axis pointing towards (β, λ) = (+55°, 75°). Given the ~10° uncertainty in the actual rotational axis of Camilla, one can say that the orbit's inclination is less than 10°.

The satellite is estimated to measure about 11 km in diameter. Assuming a similar density to the primary, this would give it an approximate mass of ~1.5×10^{15} kg. It has a similar colour to the primary.

=== Inner satellite ===
S/2016 (107) 1
Discovery
- Discovered by: M. Marsset, B. Carry, B. Yang, F. Marchis, P. Vernazza, C. Dumas, J. Berthier, F. Vachier
- Discovery date: 29 May 2015

Orbital characteristics
- Observation arc: 428 days
- Semi-major axis: 643.8±1.3 km
- Eccentricity: 0.18+0.08 −0.06
- Orbital period (sidereal): 1.376±0.005 d
- Inclination: 27.7°±7.3°
- Satellite of: 107 Camilla

Physical characteristics
- Mean diameter: 4.0±1.2 km, assuming equal albedos and D_{Camilla} = 254 km

In 2016, the discovery of a second satellite of Camilla was reported by astronomers at Cerro Paranal's Very Large Telescope in Chile. It has the provisional designation S/2016 (107) 1.

Observations were taken between 29 May 2015 and 30 July 2016, using the VLT-SPHERE, the principal instrument attached to the 8-meter "Melipal" (UT3) unit of the VLT. On 3 out of 5 observation sessions, the new satellite could be detected. The body's orbit has a semi-major axis of 340 kilometers.
