= ASTER (spacecraft) =

Planned asteroid orbiter mission

- Mission type: Technology, reconnaissance
- Operator: Brazilian Space Agency (AEB)
- Mission duration: Cruise phase: 1.8 years Science phase: 4 months

Spacecraft properties
- Spacecraft: ASTER
- Bus: MetNet
- Manufacturer: Brazilian Space Agency and its Brazilian partners
- Launch mass: 150 kg (330 lb), including 66 kg (146 lb) xenon propellant
- Dry mass: 89 kg (196 lb)
- Payload mass: 30 kg (66 lb)
- Power: 2.1 kW

Start of mission
- Launch date: June 2025 (was planned)

Asteroid 2001 SN263 orbiter
- Orbital insertion: September 2027 (was planned)

Instruments
- Imaging camera, laser rangefinder, infrared spectrometer, synthetic aperture radar, mass spectrometer

ASTER was a planned space mission under development by the Brazilian Space Agency that will launch a spacecraft to orbit a near-Earth object known as (153591) 2001 SN263, a triple asteroid system. The launch was scheduled for 2025, with a rendezvous in 2024/2027.

According to de Brum et al. 2021, the launch was planned for June 2022 (asteroid arrival in December 2024) or June 2025 (arrival September 2027). As of December 2025, it has not launched, the previous dates having passed.

The mission is not on the list of projects considered by the AEB for the 2022-2031 period, nor was the list of projects from 2005-2014 or 2012-2021.

== Overview ==
Brazil is promoting STEM at its universities and technological industries by engaging in the first Brazilian deep space mission and developing all the science instrument payloads, attitude control and navigation systems, as well as solar electric propulsion. The mission was originally intended in 2010 for a 2014 launch, then pushed back to 2015, to 2020, and then set for launch in June 2025. The launch date is unknown as of December 2025. The estimated budget was of US$60 million in 2017.

The spacecraft is designed around the small Russian-Finnish spacecraft bus known as MetNet, with a total fueled mass of 150 kg (330 lb). The spacecraft features four solar electric thrusters developed by Brazil. The engines are Hall effect thrusters powered by solar panels made out of gallium arsenide that are capable of generating up to 2.1 kW. From this, 110 W will be available to science instruments.

The target is 2001 SN263, a triple asteroid system in the Amor asteroid group. The ASTER mission team leaders are Antonio Gil Vicente de Brum, Marcelo Assafin, Flávio C. Cruz, and Álvaro Alberto Cuccolo.

== Objectives ==
The primary objective of ASTER project is to promote science, technology, engineering, and mathematics (STEM) at its universities and technological industries by engaging in the first Brazilian deep space mission. Since 2010, Brazil has been developing the desired science instrument payloads, attitude control and navigation systems, as well as a novel solar electric propulsion engine with reduced energy requirements.

The science objectives include measurements of the bulk properties of the triple asteroid system (size, shape, volume, density, dynamics, spin state, and rotation speed), the internal properties (structure, mass distribution, gravitational field) and surface properties (mineral composition, morphology, elemental composition).

ASTER may carry an astrobiology experiment to determine the viability of some selected microorganisms in deep space, and it may also measure the deep space plasma environment along the trajectory.

== Science payload ==
The 30 kg (66 lb) science payload consists of:

- Imaging Camera, a multispectral camera with wide and narrow-band
- Laser rangefinder, called ASTER Laser Rangefinder (ALR), will map the surface and texture of the target asteroids, and perform a geodesic and geophysical characterization with a ≤10 m precision. Its mass is <5 kg, and the power required is < 20 W
- Infrared spectrometer, to determine surface composition
- Mass spectrometer, to determine the asteroid surface composition
- Synthetic aperture radar (SAR), to produce two-dimensional images or three-dimensional reconstructions of the asteroids
- Along the trajectory, some microbiology experiments may be performed to measure microorganisms' survival in deep space.

== Solar electric propulsion ==
Permanent Magnet Hall Thruster (PMHT)	Units
Designer	University of Brasília
Number of thrusters	4 (two are spares)
Power from solar panels	Average: 2.0 kW
Power consumption	450 W per thruster
Thrust	40 mN per thruster
Specific impulse (I_{sp})	2,300 seconds
Thruster dimensions	Diameter: 15 cm (5.9 in); Length: 10 cm (3.9 in); Mass: 4.5 kg (9.9 lb)
Propellant	66 kg (146 lb) of xenon

The spacecraft features a type of solar electric propulsion based on the Hall effect thruster. The thruster was developed by the Plasma Physics Laboratory at the University of Brasília (LFP-UnB). The engineers created a modification that employs an array of permanent magnets to produce a radial magnetic field inside the plasma channel of the thruster to accelerate the xenon propellant ions and generate thrust. Bench tests in vacuum indicate that the use of permanent magnets reduces the electrical power consumption by 30%, which allows for the use of smaller and lighter solar panels. The Brazilian engineers named it Permanent Magnet Hall Thruster, or PMHT.

The spacecraft architecture plans to mount four PMHT plasma thrusters, where two will be spares. All four thrusters operating simultaneously produce 160 mN, although the ASTER mission can be performed with thrust in the interval between 80 mN to 120 mN of total thrust.

The spacecraft will be launched to low Earth orbit (approximately 400 km altitude), where it will then use its plasma thrusters to increase its speed and raise its elliptical orbit until it reaches escape velocity for an heliocentric transfer to the asteroid. Complex modeling was done to determine techniques to safely orbit the triple system at close range.

== Target asteroid system ==
The 2001 SN_{263} triple asteroid system is a carbonaceous (C-type asteroid) from the Amor asteroid group. Such asteroids hold clues of the initial stages of planetary formation and also the origin of water and abiogenesis on Earth. The main central body is an irregular object with a diameter about 2.8 km, while the other two are small objects 1.1 km and 0.4 km across.

== See also ==
- List of minor planets and comets visited by spacecraft
