= 46610 Bésixdouze =

Main-belt asteroid

Discovery
- Discovered by: K. Endate; K. Watanabe
- Discovery site: Kitami Obs.
- Discovery date: 15 October 1993

Designations
- Pronunciation: French pronunciation: [be.sis.duːz]
- Named after: Asteroid B-612 (home of The Little Prince)
- Alternative designations: 1993 TQ_{1} · 1986 RU_{7} 2000 VV_{32}
- Minor planet category: main-belt · {(inner) background

Orbital characteristics
- Epoch 23 March 2018 (JD 2458200.5)
- Uncertainty parameter 0
- Observation arc: 31.55 yr (11,525 days)
- Aphelion: 2.6816 AU
- Perihelion: 1.8581 AU
- Semi-major axis: 2.2698 AU
- Eccentricity: 0.1814
- Orbital period (sidereal): 3.42 yr (1,249 days)
- Mean anomaly: 52.86°
- Mean motion: 0° 17^{m} 17.52^{s} / day
- Inclination: 2.4053°
- Longitude of ascending node: 172.13°
- Argument of perihelion: 211.83°

Physical characteristics
- Dimensions: 2.064±0.499 km
- Geometric albedo: 0.262±0.054
- Absolute magnitude (H): 15.4

46610 Bésixdouze (French pronunciation: [be.sis.duːz]; provisional designation 1993 TQ_{1}) is a bright background asteroid from the inner regions of the asteroid belt, approximately 2 kilometers in diameter. It was discovered on 15 October 1993, by Japanese amateur astronomers Kin Endate and Kazuro Watanabe at the Kitami Observatory in eastern Hokkaidō, Japan. The asteroid was named after "B-612", home of The Little Prince.

== Orbit and classification ==
Bésixdouze is a non-family asteroid from the main belt's background population. It orbits the Sun in the inner main-belt at a distance of 1.9–2.7 AU once every 3 years and 5 months (1,249 days; semi-major axis of 2.27 AU). Its orbit has an eccentricity of 0.18 and an inclination of 2° with respect to the ecliptic.

The asteroid was first identified as 1986 RU_{7} at Crimea–Nauchnij in a single image taken in September 1986.

== Physical characteristics ==
=== Diameter and albedo ===
According to the survey carried out by the NEOWISE mission of NASA's Wide-field Infrared Survey Explorer, Bésixdouze measures 2.064 kilometers in diameter and its surface has an albedo of 0.262, which is indicative for a stony composition.

=== Rotation period ===
As of 2018, no rotational lightcurve of Bésixdouze has been obtained from photometric observations. The body's rotation period, poles and shape remain unknown.

== Naming ==
The name was suggested by F. Hemery and Jiří Grygar as a reference to the French novella The Little Prince. The title character lived on an asteroid named B-612, which is the number 46610 written in hexadecimal notation. Bésixdouze (French pronunciation: [be.sis.duːz]; "B-six-twelve") is one way to pronounce B-612 in French. Like the asteroid in The Little Prince, Bésixdouze was first observed in a single night, several years before its official discovery.

The official naming citation was published by the Minor Planet Center on 20 November 2002 (M.P.C. 47170). It says:

"The decimal number 46610 translates to the hexadecimal B612, the designation of the fictitious minor planet in de St. Exupéry's 1943 novel Le Petit Prince. B612 was allegedly spotted on a single night in 1909 and reported at a meeting in 1920. The name was suggested independently by F. Hémery and J. Grygar."

== See also ==
- 2578 Saint-Exupéry
- B612 Foundation
- Petit-Prince (moon)
