= Petit-Prince (moon) =

Satellite of 45 Eugenia

Discovery
- Discovered by: W. J. Merline, L. M. Close, C. Dumas, C. R. Chapman, F. Roddier, F. Menard, D. C. Slater, G. Duvert, J. C. Shelton, T. Morgan
- Discovery date: 1 November 1998

Designations
- Pronunciation: /ˌpɛtiˈprɪns/ French: [pətipʁɛ̃s]
- Named after: Napoléon, Prince Imperial and The Little Prince
- Minor planet category: Main belt

Orbital characteristics
- Semi-major axis: 1184 ± 12 km
- Eccentricity: 0.0100 ± 0.0002
- Orbital period (sidereal): 4.766 ± 0.001 d
- Average orbital speed: 18.1 m/s
- Inclination: 7.0 ± 0.1° (with respect to Eugenia equator)
- Satellite of: 45 Eugenia

Physical characteristics
- Dimensions: ~ 13 km (estimate)
- Mass: ~ 1.2×10^{15} kg (estimate)
- Equatorial escape velocity: ~ 5 m/s (estimate)
- Absolute magnitude (H): 13.6

Petit-Prince, formal designation (45) Eugenia I, is the larger, outer moon of asteroid 45 Eugenia. It was discovered in 1998 by astronomers at the Canada-France-Hawaii Telescope on Mauna Kea, Hawaii. Initially, it received the provisional designation S/1998 (45) 1. Petit-Prince was the first asteroid moon to be discovered with a ground-based telescope. Previously, the only known moon of an asteroid was Dactyl, discovered by the Galileo space probe, around 243 Ida.

== Characteristics ==
Petit-Prince is 13 km in diameter, compared to 45 Eugenia's 214 km. It takes five days to complete an orbit around Eugenia.

== Name ==
The discoverers chose the name in honour of Empress Eugénie's son, the Prince Imperial. However, they also intended an allusion to the children's book The Little Prince by Antoine de Saint-Exupéry, which is about a prince who lives on an asteroid.

In their submission of the name to the IAU, the discovers justified the double meaning by arguing for similarities between the Prince Imperial and the Little Prince:

"Both princes were young and adventurous, and had little fear of danger. Both were of rather small stature. They both left the confines of their cozy little worlds (asteroid B612 for the Little Prince and Chislehurst for the Prince Imperial). They both then undertook long journeys to end up in Africa, whereupon they both meet rather violent deaths ... And in both cases, they lay alone for one night each after "death" and then "returned" back home..."

== See also ==
- 2578 Saint-Exupéry
- 46610 Bésixdouze, whose name is the reading of B612 in French, after its permanent designation 46,610 (hexadecimal B612).
