= Unistellar =

French telescope manufacturer

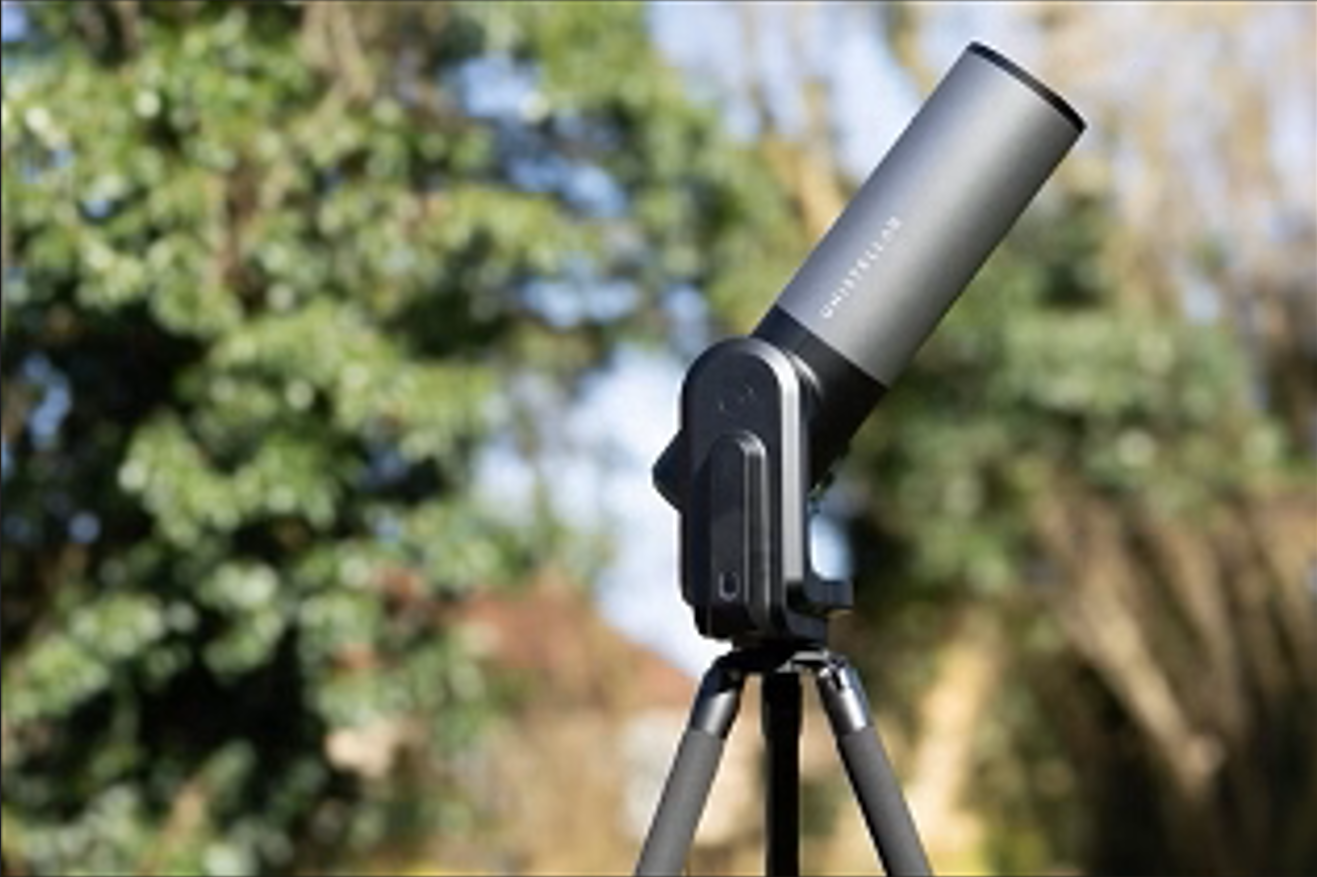
Evscope telescope

Unistellar is a French manufacturer of computer-connected telescopes that allow non-professional skywatchers to observe astronomical objects at relatively low cost. The first product launched was named the eVscope, and used digital astrophotographic techniques. SETI Institute has partnered with Unistellar and will be able to send requests for information and notifications to users, and receive information about transient astronomical events.

== History ==
The company was founded in Marseille, France, in 2015, with incubator investment from Incubateur Impulse and Pépinières d'Entreprises Innovantes with subsequent VC round capital from private investors and a VC firm named Brighteye Ventures. Unistellar unveiled their electronic telescope technology prototype in 2017 at CES2017 in Las Vegas and at IFA Next in Berlin.

The company experienced difficulties bringing the product to market. The consumer-grade electronic telescope was originally planned to be available in "fall 2018" which subsequently shifted to "early 2019," then later in 2019.

By January 2020, the telescope was expected to be shipped worldwide between May and August 2020. As of December 2021, over 5000 telescopes had been delivered to customers The kit included a custom tripod and mount, a Bahtinov mask and a protective cap. Later, Unistellar introduced two new telescopes, eVscope 2 with bigger FOV and better monitor which won the T3 Platinum Award, and eQuinox with longer battery life and no monitor.

== eVscope ==
The eVscope is a 114 mm (4.5 in)-diameter Prime focus reflector, focal length 450 mm. It projects its image onto a 4.8 mm × 3.6 mm (0.19 in × 0.14 in) CMOS color sensor with 1.3 million pixels. An electronic connection to a computer (smartphone, tablet, or laptop) is required to use the telescope. The image is also transmitted to a small screen in an eyepiece also mounted on the telescope. Live stacking of images taken by the telescope can produce images of Messier objects and faint stars as dim as an apparent magnitude of 15 with consumer-grade equipment. As of 2024, 25,000 units were sold.

== Science ==
As presented in American Geophysical Union (AGU) 2021 Fall Meeting, the eVscope had observed many astronomical objects up to December 2021, including the detection by 79 observers of 85 transits by Jupiter-sized exoplanets, 281 asteroid occultations (including forty-five positive ones), and three shape and spin solutions for near-Earth asteroids. The network also supported NASA's TESS mission by making transatlantic observations of an exoplanet transit, and NASA's Lucy mission by profiling Trojan asteroids this spacecraft will visit. These data are collected by observers in Europe, North America, Japan, Australia, and New Zealand. Unistellar aims to expand the network to the rest of Asia and to South America.

The Unistellar Exoplanet (UE) campaign helped to improve the measurement accuracy of the orbital period of TOI 3799.01. The UE campaign also helps to refine the orbit of long-period exoplanets, such as the Jupiter-analog Kepler-167e and the eccentric planet HD 80606b, which have transit durations longer than 10 hours. This refinement will help with follow-up observations, such as JWST observation of HD 80606b.

In July 2025, a community of smart telescope users have captured and shared images of the interstellar comet that had entered our Solar System.

Unistellar citizen science projects include asteroid occultations, exoplanet transits, planetary defense (Near-Earth asteroids and main-belt lightcurves), cometary activity, and cosmic cataclysms (supernova, recurrent nova, gamma-ray bursts, and variable stars).

== See also ==
- Digiscoping
