= (136617) 1994 CC =

Near-Earth asteroid

- Goldstone animation of 1994 CC orbited by two minor-planet moons in 2009

Discovery
- Discovered by: Spacewatch
- Discovery site: Kitt Peak National Obs.
- Discovery date: 3 February 1994

Designations
- Minor planet category: NEO · PHA · Apollo; Earth-crosser

Orbital characteristics
- Epoch 4 September 2017 (JD 2458000.5)
- Uncertainty parameter 0
- Observation arc: 28.45 yr (10,391 days)
- Aphelion: 2.3206 AU
- Perihelion: 0.9551 AU
- Semi-major axis: 1.6378 AU
- Eccentricity: 0.4169
- Orbital period (sidereal): 2.10 yr (766 days)
- Mean anomaly: 321.07°
- Mean motion: 0° 28^{m} 12.72^{s} / day
- Inclination: 4.6806°
- Longitude of ascending node: 268.55°
- Argument of perihelion: 24.842°
- Known satellites: 2
- Earth MOID: 0.0157 AU · 6.1 LD

Physical characteristics
- Mean diameter: 0.62±0.06 km 0.650 km
- Mass: (2.69±0.329)×10^{11} kg (system mass) (2.5935±0.1315)×10^{11} kg (primary)
- Mean density: 2.1±0.6 g/cm^{3} (system) 1.98 g/cm^{3} (primary)
- Synodic rotation period: 2.3886±0.0001 h 2.38860±0.00009 h
- Geometric albedo: 0.3821 (derived) · 0.42±0.1
- Spectral type: Sq · Sa · S
- Absolute magnitude (H): 17.00 · 17.7 · 18.12±0.84

(136617) 1994 CC is a sub-kilometer triple asteroid, classified as a near-Earth object and potentially hazardous asteroid of the Apollo group.

== Discovery ==
1994 CC was discovered by Spacewatch's Jim Scotti at Kitt Peak National Observatory on 3 February 1994. In June 2009 it was shown to be a triple system, i.e. the largest body is orbited by two satellites; only about one percent (1%) of near-Earth asteroids observed by a radar are found to be triple systems such as this one. The only other unambiguously identified triple asteroids in the near-Earth population are (153591) 2001 SN263, which was discovered to be a triple system in 2008, and 3122 Florence, which was found to be a triple system in 2017.

== Observations ==
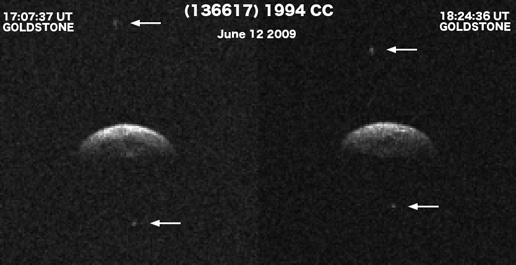
Radar images of 1994 CC at two different times with its two moons

A team of NASA's Jet Propulsion Laboratory (JPL) (Pasadena, California) scientists led by Marina Brozovic and Lance Benner, made the discovery using radar imaging at NASA's Goldstone Solar System Radar on June 12 and June 14, 2009. They showed that the near-Earth asteroid 1994 CC is a triple system, which encountered Earth within 2.52 million kilometers on June 10, 2009. This relatively close approach to Earth made the discovery possible, as before the approach, scientists knew very little about this asteroid. In fact, 1994 CC is only the second triple system known in the near-Earth objects population.

1994 CC consists of a central object about 700 meters in diameter that has two moons revolving around it. Scientists' preliminary analysis of the system suggests that the moons are at least 50 meters in diameter. In a similar study, the radar observations at Arecibo Observatory in Puerto Rico, led by Mike Nolan, also confirmed the detection of all three objects. The scientists plan to use the combined observations from the Goldstone and Arecibo observatories to study 1994 CC's orbital and physical properties further.

The next similar Earth flyby for the asteroid 1994 CC will happen in 2074 when the triple system is projected to fly past Earth at a distance of 2.5 million kilometers.

== Orbital characteristics of satellites ==
The orbital properties of the satellites are listed in this table. The orbital planes of both satellites are inclined relative to each other, by approximately 16°. Such a large inclination is suggestive of past evolutionary events (e.g. close encounter with a terrestrial planet, mean-motion resonance crossing) that may have excited their orbits from a coplanar configuration to an inclined state.

Name	Mass [10^{9} kg]	Semi-major axis [km]	Orbital period [days]	Eccentricity	Inclination (relative to asteroid) [°]
Beta	5.8+0.3 −0.5	1.729±0.008	1.243±0.0329	0.002±0.015	83.376±11.158
Gamma	0.911+2.0 −0.9	6.130±0.108	8.376±0.404	0.192±0.014	71.709±8.994

== Numbering and naming ==
This minor planet was numbered by the Minor Planet Center on 5 December 2006. As of 2019, it has not been named.

== See also ==
- List of exceptional asteroids
- 2004 FH
- 87 Sylvia
- 433 Eros
- (153591) 2001 SN263
