= 3122 Florence =

Near-Earth asteroid with 2 moons

- Arecibo radar imaging of 3122 Florence orbited by two minor-planet moons on 4 September 2017

Discovery
- Discovered by: Schelte J. "Bobby" Bus
- Discovery site: Siding Spring Obs.
- Discovery date: 2 March 1981 (45 years ago)

Designations
- Pronunciation: /ˈflɒrəns/
- Named after: Florence Nightingale (English nurse)
- Alternative designations: 1981 ET_{3} · 1983 CN_{1}
- Minor planet category: Amor · NEO · PHA

Orbital characteristics
- Epoch 4 September 2017 (JD 2458000.5)
- Uncertainty parameter 0
- Observation arc: 38.52 yr (14,069 days)
- Aphelion: 2.5180 AU
- Perihelion: 1.0203 AU
- Semi-major axis: 1.7691 AU
- Eccentricity: 0.4233
- Orbital period (sidereal): 2.35 yr (859 days)
- Mean anomaly: 351.44°
- Mean motion: 0° 25^{m} 8.04^{s} / day
- Inclination: 22.151°
- Longitude of ascending node: 336.10°
- Argument of perihelion: 27.847°
- Known satellites: 2
- Earth MOID: 0.0443 AU · 17.3 LD

Physical characteristics
- Mean diameter: 4.010±1.237 km 4.349 km 4.35 km (taken); 4.401±0.030 km 4.9 km
- Mean density: 1.4 g/cm^{3}
- Synodic rotation period: 2.3580±0.0002 h 2.3581 h (Note: Pravec (2002/2003) web: rotation period 2.3581±0.0001 hours with a brightness amplitude of 0.15 and 0.18 mag, respectively. Summary figures at Collaborative Asteroid Lightcurve Link (CALL) for (3122) Florence and Pravec, P.; Wolf, M.; Sarounova, L. (2002)); 2.3582±0.0003 h 2.3588±0.0008 h 2.359±0.001 h 2.359±0.003 h 5±1 h
- Geometric albedo: 0.146; 0.21±0.20; 0.231±0.049; 0.258±0.199
- Spectral type: SMASS = S · Sq
- Absolute magnitude (H): 13.87±0.1 (R) · 14.0 · 14.04±0.1 (R) · 14.1 · 14.515±0.11 · 14.65±0.11 · 14.65±0.3

3122 Florence is a stony triple asteroid of the Amor group. It is classified as a near-Earth object and potentially hazardous asteroid. It measures approximately 5 kilometers in diameter. It orbits the Sun at a distance of 1.0–2.5 AU once every 2 years and 4 months (859 days); the orbit has an eccentricity of 0.42 and an inclination of 22° with respect to the ecliptic. Florence has two moons.

Florence was discovered on 2 March 1981 by American astronomer Schelte J. "Bobby" Bus at Siding Spring Observatory. Its provisional designation was 1981 ET_{3}. It was named in honor of Florence Nightingale, the founder of modern nursing; the naming citation was published on 6 April 1993 (M.P.C. 21955).

Florence is classified as a potentially hazardous object because its minimum orbit intersection distance (MOID ≤ 0.05 AU) indicates that it has the potential to make close approaches to the Earth, and because measurements of its absolute magnitude (H ≤ 22) suggest that it is large enough to create serious damage were it to impact.

== Moons ==
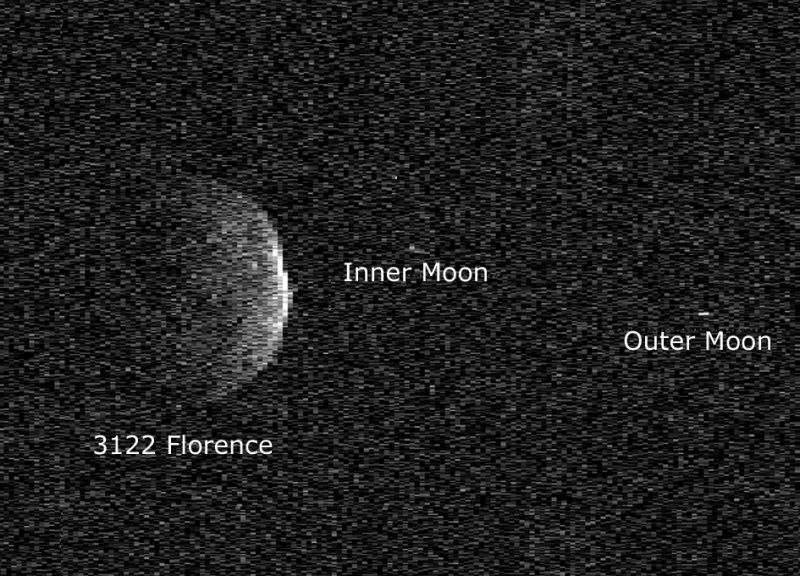
Triple asteroid: Florence with its two satellites

Radar observations during the 2017 flyby have shown that Florence has two moons. The inner of the two moons is estimated to have a diameter of 180 to 240 meters, the outer moon is between 300 and 360 meters across. Each moon is somewhat elongated, and both are tidally locked to the main body. They probably formed as loose material spun away from the main body as its rotation accelerated due to the YORP effect.

The inner moon's period orbiting Florence appears to be approximately 7 hours, while the outer moon completes a revolution in about 21 to 23 hours. The inner moon of Florence has the shortest orbital period of any of the moons of the 60 near-Earth asteroids known to have moons.

Florence is only the third known triple asteroid in the near-Earth asteroid population, after (153591) 2001 SN263 and (136617) 1994 CC.

== 2017 close approach ==
On 1 September 2017, Florence passed 0.047237 AU (7,066,600 km; 4,391,000 mi) from Earth, approximately eighteen times the average distance of the Moon. As seen from Earth, it brightened to apparent magnitude 8.5, and was visible in small telescopes for several nights as it moved south to north through the constellations Piscis Austrinus, Capricornus, Aquarius, and Delphinus. This was the asteroid's closest approach since 1890 and the closest until after 2500. Its previous flyby was on 29 August 1930, at a distance of 0.05239 AU and the next one will be on 2 September 2057, at 0.049952 AU.

Animation: 2017-08-30 21:48:46 to 22:53:00 UTC

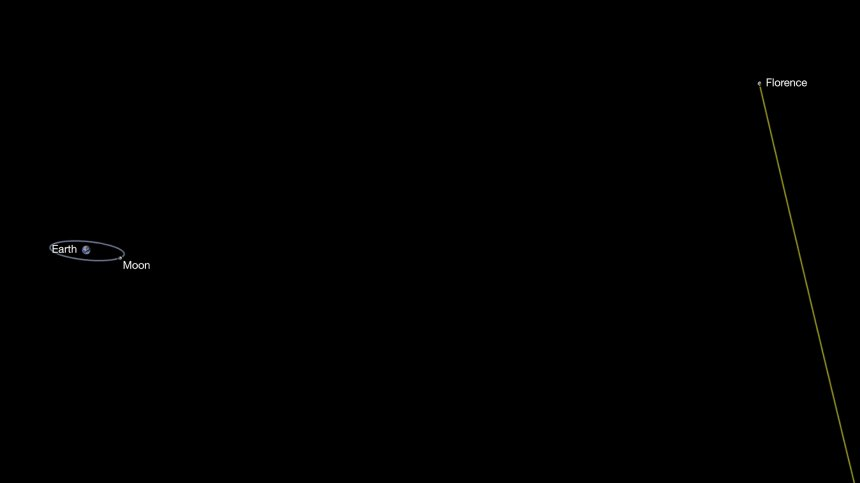
3122 Florence passing the Earth in 2017

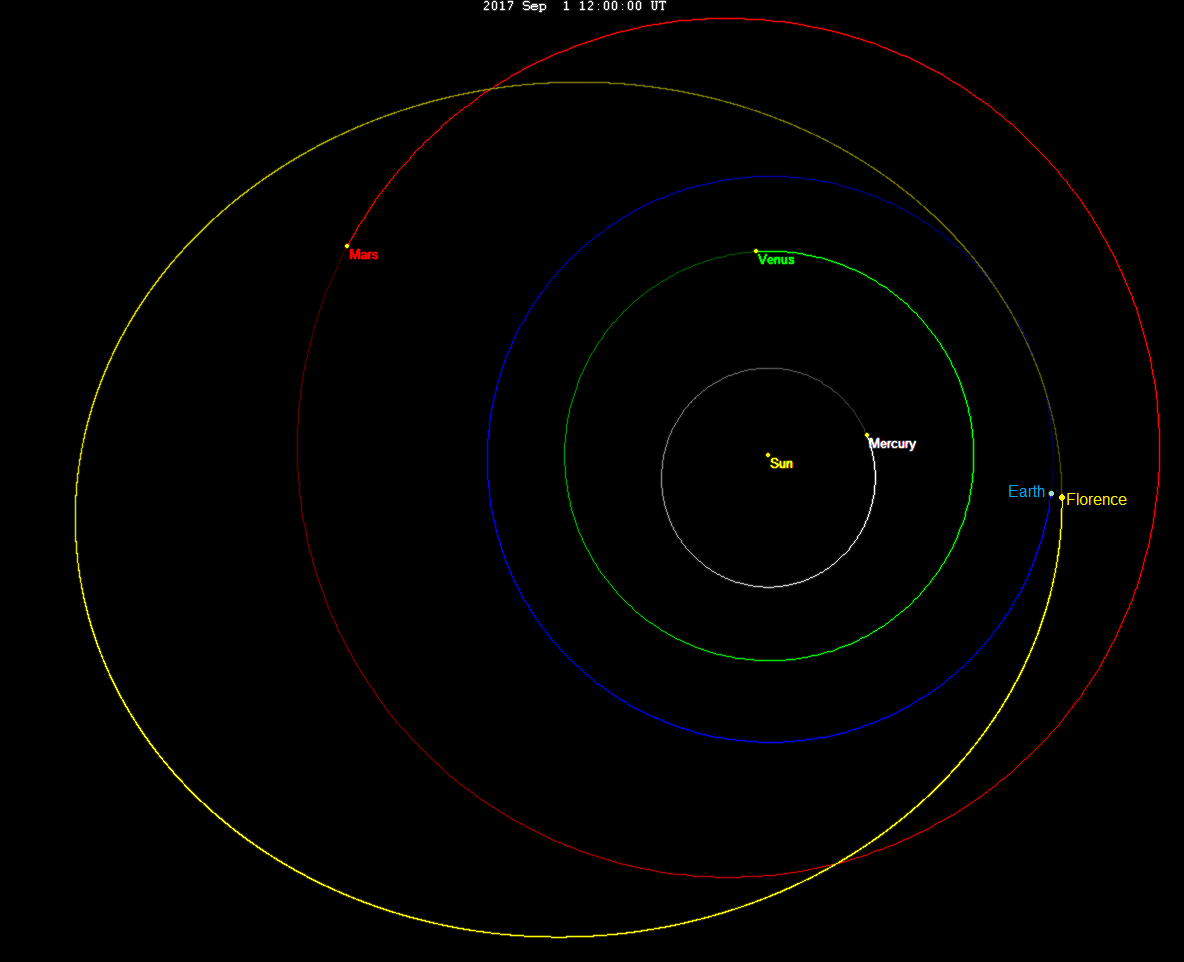
Orbit of Florence

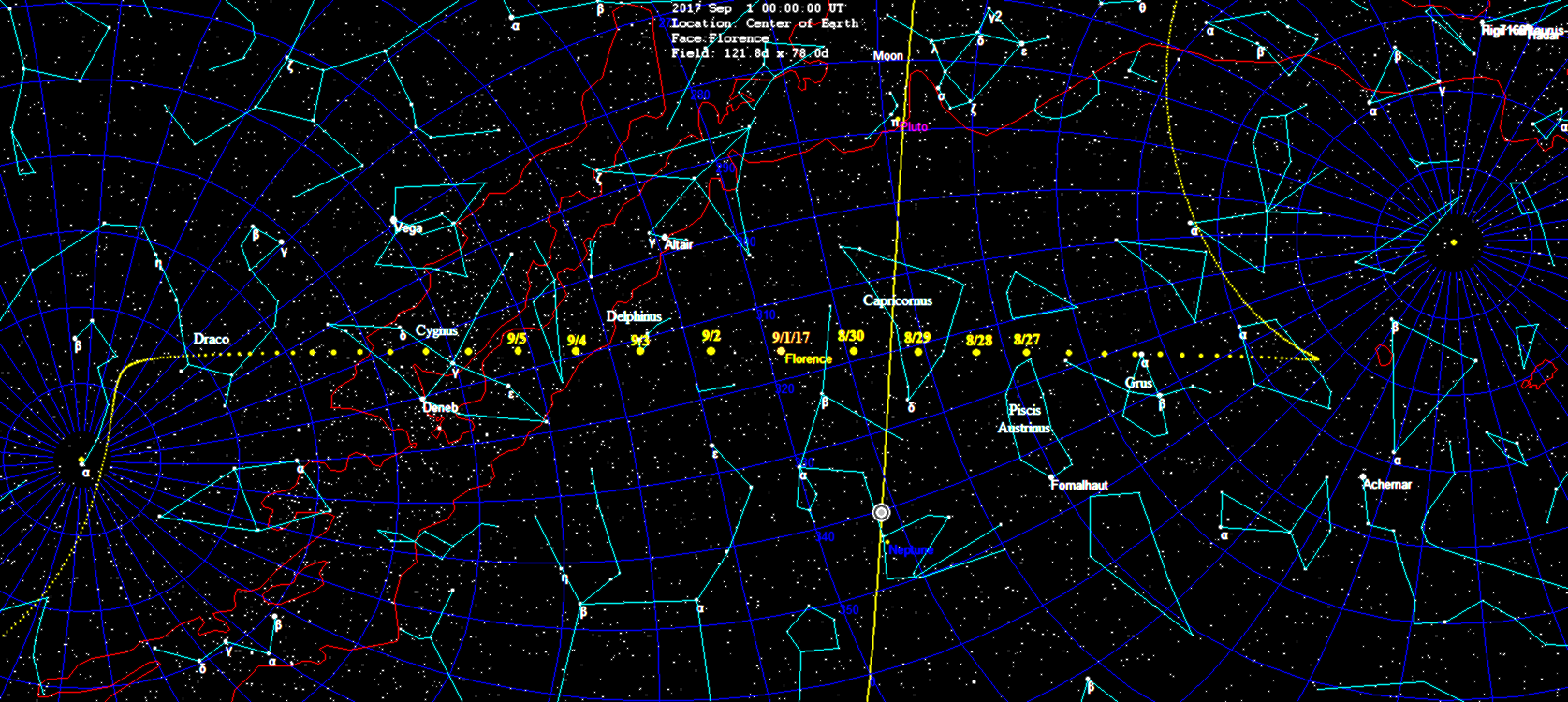
Daily motion of 3122 Florence as seen from earth near 1 September 2017 flyby.

=== Radar imagery ===
During the flyby, scientists studied Florence using the Arecibo Observatory and the Goldstone Deep Space Communications Complex, and discovered that it has two moons.

Goldstone Radar

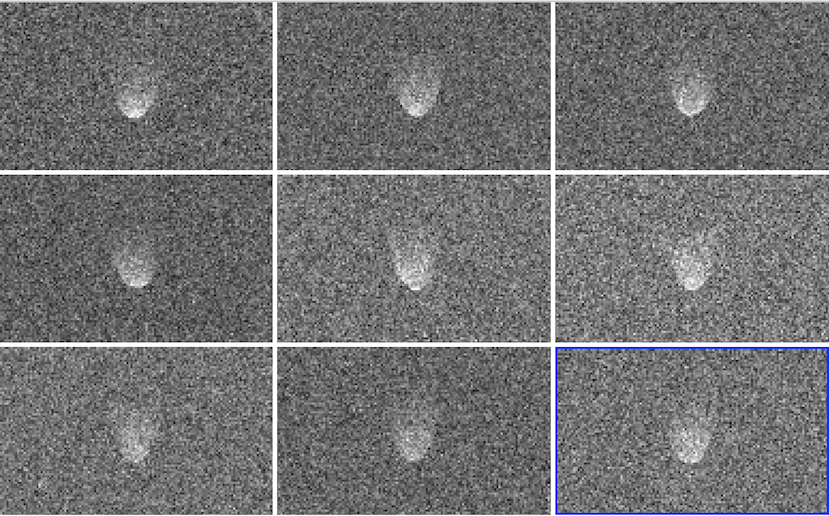
Aug 29

Sep 1

Arecibo Radar

Sep 2

Sep 2

Sep 3

Sep 4

Sep 5
