= (153591) 2001 SN263 =

Near-Earth asteroid

(153591) 2001 SN_{263}
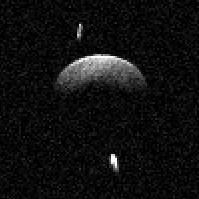
- Radar image of 2001 SN_{263} and its two satellites imaged by the Arecibo Observatory in 2008

Discovery
- Discovered by: LINEAR
- Discovery site: Lincoln Lab's ETS
- Discovery date: 20 September 2001

Designations
- Minor planet category: NEO · Amor

Orbital characteristics
- Epoch 4 September 2017 (JD 2458000.5)
- Uncertainty parameter 0
- Observation arc: 25.18 yr (9,198 days)
- Aphelion: 2.9368 AU
- Perihelion: 1.0363 AU
- Semi-major axis: 1.9865 AU
- Eccentricity: 0.4783
- Orbital period (sidereal): 2.80 yr (1,023 days)
- Mean anomaly: 148.57°
- Mean motion: 0° 21^{m} 7.2^{s} / day
- Inclination: 6.6853°
- Longitude of ascending node: 325.83°
- Argument of perihelion: 172.86°
- Known satellites: 2
- Earth MOID: 0.0520 AU · 20.3 LD

Physical characteristics
- Mean diameter: 2 km 2.5±0.3 km 2.6 km 2.63±0.40 km
- Mass: (917.5±2.2)×10^{10} kg
- Mean density: 1.1±0.2 g/cm^{3}
- Synodic rotation period: 3.20±0.01 h 3.423±0.001 h (Note: Warner (2011) web: lightcurve plot of (153591) 2001 SN263, Palmer Divide Observatory, Brian D. Warner (2008). Photometric observations from 20 February 2008: rotation period 3.423±0.001 hours with a brightness amplitude of 0.14±0.02 magnitude. Quality code: 3. Summary figures for all obtained lightcurves at Collaborative Asteroid Lightcurve Link (CALL) for (153591)); 3.42510±0.00007 h 3.4256±0.0002 h
- Geometric albedo: 0.048±0.015
- Spectral type: C · B (Note: Perna (2014): photometric observation from 24 June 2011: with a brightness amplitude of mag. Summary figures at Collaborative Asteroid Lightcurve Link (CALL) for (153591))
- Absolute magnitude (H): 16.81 · 16.9

(153591) 2001 SN_{263} is a carbonaceous triple asteroid, classified as a near-Earth object and former potentially hazardous asteroid of the Amor group, approximately 2.6 kilometers (1.6 miles) in diameter. It was discovered by the Lincoln Near-Earth Asteroid Research project at Lincoln Lab's Experimental Test Site in Socorro, New Mexico, on 20 September 2001. The two synchronous minor-planet moons measure approximately 770 and 430 meters and have an orbital period of 16.46 and 150 hours, respectively.

== Numbering and naming ==
This minor planet was numbered by the Minor Planet Center on 2 April 2007. As of 2018, the primary and its moons have not been named. In the scientific literature, the components of the triple system are generically referred to as Alpha, Beta and Gamma, but these labels are not recognized by the IAU.

== Primary ==
2001 SN_{263}, the primary object of this triple system, is an unusual carbonaceous near-Earth asteroid of a C- or somewhat brighter B-type. It orbits the Sun at a distance of 1.0–2.9 AU once every 2 years and 10 months (1,023 days). Its orbit has an eccentricity of 0.48 and an inclination of 7° with respect to the ecliptic. A first precovery was taken at Palomar Observatory during the Digitized Sky Survey in 1990, extending the body's observation arc by 11 years prior to its official discovery observation at Socorro.

It has an Earth minimum orbital intersection distance (MOID) of 0.0520 AU (7,780,000 km), which translates into 20.3 lunar distances. With an Earth MOID above 0.05 AU, 2001 SN_{263} is no longer a potentially hazardous asteroid, but it was classified as such by the MPC until early 2017.

Radar observations show that it measures 2.5 kilometers in diameter. Its surface has a low albedo of 0.048. Rotational lightcurves obtained from photometric observations gave a rotation period of 3.423 hours (best result) with a brightness variation between 0.13 and 0.27 magnitude (U=2/3/3). Radar observations gave a concurring period of 3.4256 hours, and subsequent modeling of both radiometric and photometric observations gave a spin axis of (309.0°, −80.0°) in ecliptic coordinates (λ, β).

== Triple system ==
In 2008, scientists using the planetary radar at Arecibo Observatory discovered that the object is orbited by two satellites, when the triple asteroid made a close approach to Earth of 0.066 AU (nearly 10 million kilometers). The largest body (preliminarily called Alpha) is spheroid in shape, with principal axes of 2.8±0.1 km, 2.7±0.1 km, and 2.9±0.3 km, with an effective diameter of 2.5±0.3 km and a density of 1.1±0.2 g/cm^{3}. The satellites, named Beta and Gamma, are several times smaller in size. Beta is 0.77±0.12 km in diameter and Gamma 0.43±0.14 km.

The only other unambiguously identified triple asteroids in the near-Earth population are (136617) 1994 CC, which was discovered to be a triple system in 2009, and 3122 Florence, which was found to be a triple system in September 2017.

=== Orbital characteristics of satellites ===
The orbital properties of the satellites are listed in this table. The orbital planes of both satellites are inclined relative to each other; the relative inclination is about 14 degrees. Such a large inclination is suggestive of past evolutionary events (e.g. close encounter with a terrestrial planet, mean-motion-resonance crossing) that may have excited their orbits from a coplanar configuration to an inclined state.

Name	Mass (est.)	Semi-major axis	Orbital period	Eccentricity
Gamma (inner)	10×10^{10} kg	3.8 km	0.686 days	0.016
Beta (outer)	24×10^{10} kg	16.6 km	6.225 days	0.015

== Exploration ==
This triple asteroid system is the target for the planned ASTER mission scheduled for launch in 2025 by the Brazilian Space Agency.
