= 216 Kleopatra =

M-type asteroid

- VLT-SPHERE image of Kleopatra

Discovery
- Discovered by: J. Palisa
- Discovery site: Pola Obs.
- Discovery date: 10 April 1880

Designations
- Pronunciation: /ˌkliəˈpætrə/
- Named after: Cleopatra (Egyptian queen)
- Alternative designations: A880 GB · 1905 OA; 1910 RA
- Minor planet category: main-belt · (central) background
- Adjectives: Kleopatrian, Kleopatrean

Orbital characteristics
- Epoch 23 March 2018 (JD 2458200.5)
- Uncertainty parameter 0
- Observation arc: 137.60 yr (50,259 d)
- Aphelion: 3.4951 AU
- Perihelion: 2.0931 AU
- Semi-major axis: 2.7941 AU
- Eccentricity: 0.2509
- Orbital period (sidereal): 4.67 yr (1,706 d)
- Mean anomaly: 346.24°
- Mean motion: 0° 12^{m} 39.6^{s} / day
- Inclination: 13.113°
- Longitude of ascending node: 215.36°
- Argument of perihelion: 180.11°
- Known satellites: 2 (Alexhelios · Cleoselene)

Physical characteristics
- Dimensions: (267 × 61 × 48) ± 6 km (MPCD) (270 × 62 × 38) ± 4 km (ADAM)
- Mean diameter: 118±2 km 118.75±1.40 km
- Surface area: 59828 km^{2} (Note: Calculated from the surface-equivalent radius of a sphere of 69.0 km.)
- Volume: (8.65±0.17)×10^{5} km^{3} (MPCD) (8.90±0.45)×10^{5} km^{3} (ADAM)
- Mass: (2.97±0.32)×10^{18} kg
- Mean density: 3.45±0.41 g/cm^{3} 3.38±0.50 g/cm^{3}
- Synodic rotation period: 5.3852827±0.0000003 h
- Axial tilt: 61°
- Pole ecliptic longitude: 74.1° ± 0.5° (MPCD); 73.5° ± 0.5° (ADAM)
- Pole ecliptic latitude: 21.6° ± 0.5° (MPCD); 20.8° ± 0.5° (ADAM)
- Geometric albedo: 0.152 (calculated); 0.1164±0.004; 0.170; 0.149±0.005; 0.1111±0.0336; 0.1068; 0.200±0.028
- Spectral type: M (Tholen) · Xe (SMASS); M B–V = 0.713; U–B = 0.238
- Absolute magnitude (H): 7.30; 7.02; 7.35±0.02; 7.45

216 Kleopatra is a large M-type asteroid with a mean diameter of 120 kilometers (75 miles) and is noted for its elongate bone or dumbbell shape. It was discovered on 10 April 1880 by Austrian astronomer Johann Palisa at the Austrian Naval Pola Observatory, in what is now Pula, Croatia, and was named after Cleopatra VII, the famous Egyptian queen. It has two small minor-planet moons which were discovered in 2008 and later named Alexhelios and Cleoselene.

== Orbit and classification ==
216 Kleopatra is a non-family asteroid from the main asteroid belt's background population. It orbits our Sun in the central asteroid belt at a distance of 2.1–3.5 AU once every 4 years and 8 months (1,706 days; semi-major axis of 2.79 AU). Its orbit has an eccentricity of 0.25 and an inclination of 13° with respect to the ecliptic. The body's observation arc begins at Leipzig Observatory (534) on 20 April 1880, ten days after its official discovery observation at Pola Observatory.

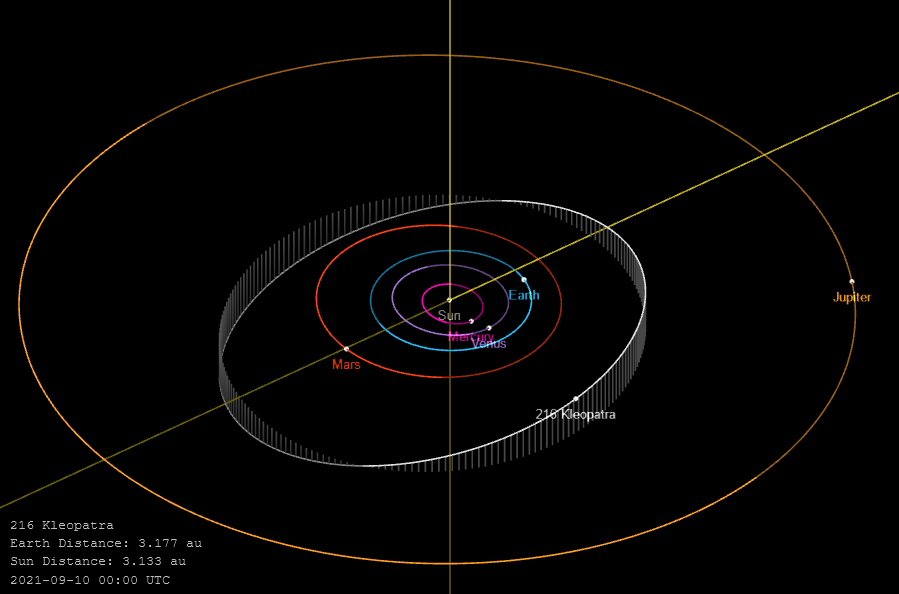

== Physical characteristics ==
=== Size and shape ===
Kleopatra is a relatively large asteroid, with a mean (volume-equivalent) diameter of 120±2 km and an unusually elongated shape.

Animated view of Kleopatra as viewed from 20° N latitude.

Animated view of Kleopatra as viewed from 20° S latitude.

The initial mapping of its elongated shape was indicated by stellar occultation observations from eight distinct locations on 19 January 1991. Subsequent observations with the ESO 3.6 m Telescope at La Silla, run by the European Southern Observatory, were interpreted to show a double source with two distinct lobes of similar size. These results were disputed when radar observations at the Arecibo Observatory showed that the two lobes of the asteroid are connected, resembling the shape of a ham-bone. The radar observations provided a detailed shape model that appeared on the cover of Science Magazine. Later models suggested that Kleopatra was more elongate and the most recent models using radar delay-Doppler imaging, adaptive optics, and stellar occultations provide dimensions of 267 × 61 × 48 km.

=== Satellites ===
In 1988 a search for satellites or dust orbiting this asteroid was performed using the UH88 telescope at the Maunakea Observatories, but the effort was fruitless. In September 2008, Franck Marchis and his collaborators announced that by using the Keck Observatory's adaptive optics system, they had discovered two moons orbiting Kleopatra. In February 2011, the minor-planet moons were named Alexhelios (/ˌæləksˈhiːliɒs/) (outer) and Cleoselene (/ˌkliːoʊsəˈliːniː/) (inner), after Cleopatra's twin children, Alexander Helios and Cleopatra Selene II. The outer and inner satellites are about 8.9 ± 1.6 and 6.9 ± 1.6 km in diameter, with periods of 2.7 and 1.8 days, respectively.

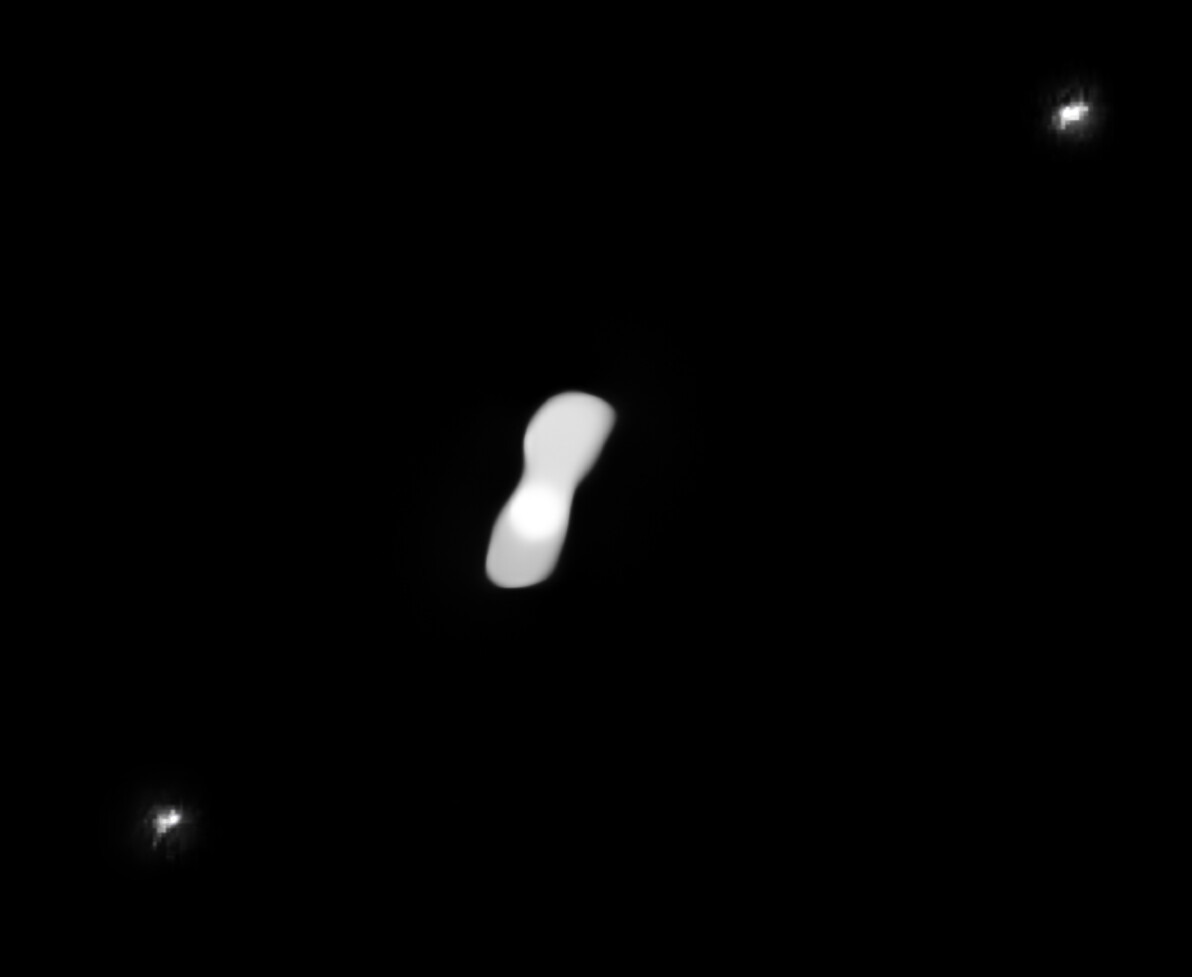
Kleopatra and its two moons imaged by VLT-SPHERE in 2017

=== Mass, density, and composition ===
The presence of two moons provides a way to estimate Kleopatra's mass, although its irregular shape makes the orbital modeling a challenge. The most recent adaptive-optics observations and modeling provides a mass of Kleopatra of (1.49±0.16)×10^{−12} M_{☉}, or (2.97±0.32)×10^{18} kg, which is significantly lower than previously thought. When combined with the best volume estimate for Kleopatra, this indicates a bulk density of 3.38±0.50 g/cm^{3}.

These recent bulk density results call into question the canonical view of Kleopatra as a pure metallic object. Kleopatra's radar albedo suggests a high metal content in the southern hemisphere, but is similar to the more common S- and C-class asteroids along the equator. One way to reconcile these observations is to hypothesize that Kleopatra is a rubble-pile asteroid with significant porosity in dynamic equilibrium.

== Origin ==
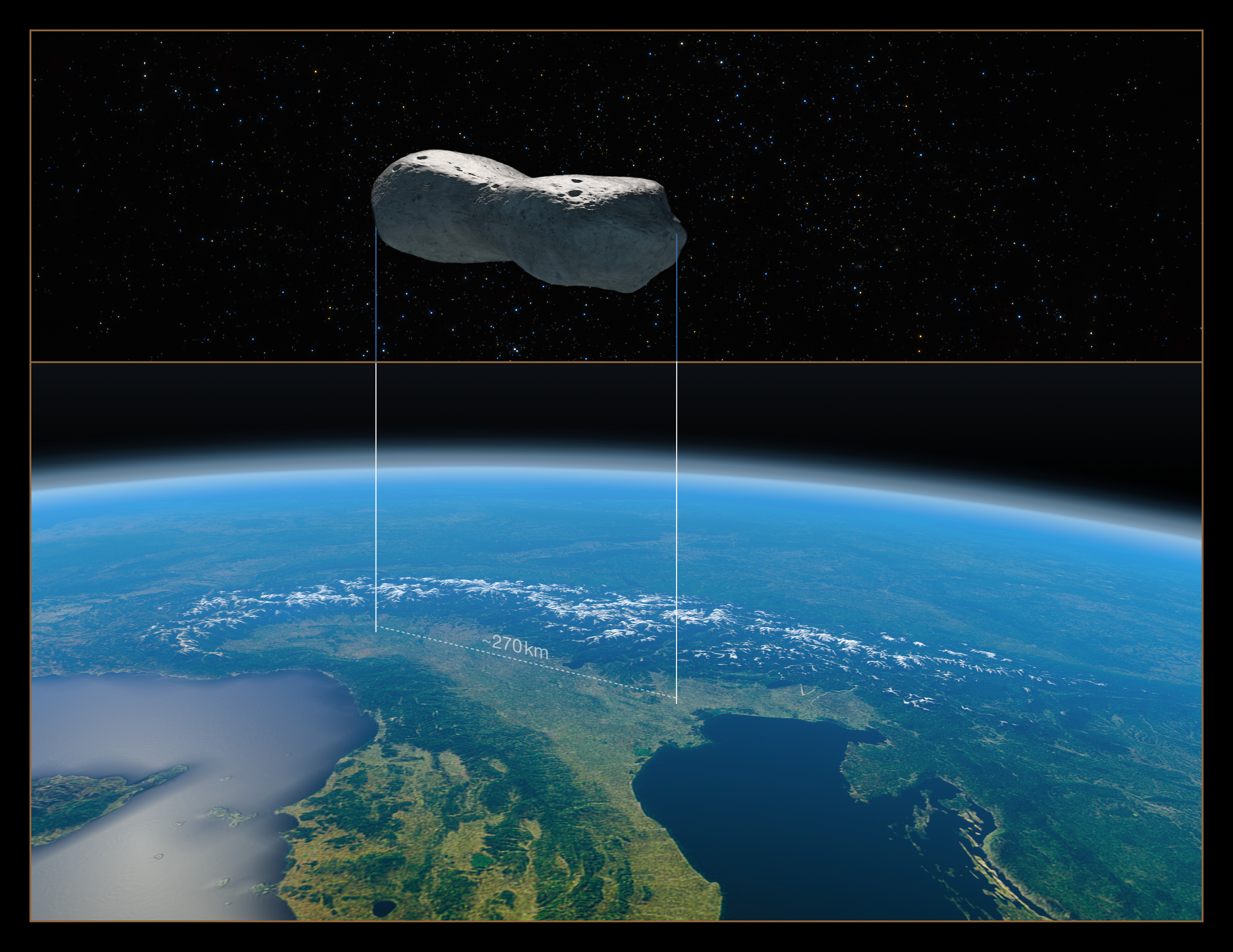
Size comparison of asteroid Kleopatra with northern Italy

One possible origin that explains Kleopatra's shape, rotation, and moons is that it was created by an oblique impact perhaps 100 million years ago. The increased rotation would have elongated the asteroid and caused Alexhelios to split off. Cleoselene may have split off later, around 10 million years ago. Kleopatra is a contact binary – if it were spinning much faster, the two lobes would separate from each other, making a true binary system.

== See also ==
- List of exceptional asteroids
- 44 Nysa – a main-belt asteroid known for having an unusual three-lobed shape and a moon
- 16 Psyche – largest M-type asteroid in the main belt
- 22 Kalliope – second largest M-type asteroid in the main belt
