= 45 Eugenia =

Asteroid with two moons

- VLT-SPHERE image of Eugenia

Discovery
- Discovered by: H. Goldschmidt
- Discovery date: 27 June 1857

Designations
- Pronunciation: /juːˈdʒiːniə/
- Named after: Empress Eugénie
- Alternative designations: 1941 BN
- Minor planet category: Main belt
- Adjectives: Eugenian

Orbital characteristics
- Epoch 26 November 2005 (JD 2453701.5)
- Aphelion: 440.305 million km (2.943 AU)
- Perihelion: 373.488 million km (2.497 AU)
- Semi-major axis: 406.897 million km (2.720 AU)
- Eccentricity: 0.082
- Orbital period (sidereal): 1,638.462 d (4.49 a)
- Mean anomaly: 45.254°
- Inclination: 6.610°
- Longitude of ascending node: 147.939°
- Argument of perihelion: 85.137°
- Known satellites: Petit-Prince; S/2004 (45) 1

Physical characteristics
- Dimensions: 252 × 191 × 138 km (± 9 × 9 × 7 km)
- Mean diameter: 188±2 km
- Mass: (5.8±0.1)×10^{18} kg
- Mean density: 1.66±0.07 g/cm^{3}
- Equatorial surface gravity: 0.024–0.081 m/s^{2}
- Equatorial escape velocity: 78–106 m/s
- Synodic rotation period: 5.699151±0.000001 h)
- Axial tilt: 123°
- Pole ecliptic longitude: 128±2°
- Pole ecliptic latitude: −35±2°
- Geometric albedo: 0.065 (calculated); 0.040±0.002
- Spectral type: F
- Absolute magnitude (H): 7.46

45 Eugenia is a large asteroid of the asteroid belt. It is famed as one of the first asteroids to be found to have a moon orbiting it. It was also the second triple asteroid to be discovered, after 87 Sylvia.

== Discovery ==
Eugenia was discovered on 27 June 1857 by the Franco–German amateur astronomer Hermann Goldschmidt. His instrument of discovery was a four-inch aperture telescope located in his sixth-floor apartment in the 6th arrondissement of Paris. It was the 45th minor planet to be discovered. The preliminary orbital elements were computed by Wilhelm Forster in Berlin, based on three observations in July 1857.

The asteroid was named by its discoverer after Empress Eugénie de Montijo, the wife of Napoleon III. It was the first asteroid to be definitely named after a real person, rather than a figure from classical legend.

== Physical characteristics ==
Eugenia is a large asteroid, with a diameter of 188 km. It is an F-type asteroid, which means that it is very dark in colouring (darker than soot) with a carbonaceous composition. Like Mathilde, its density appears to be unusually low, indicating that it may be a loosely packed rubble pile, not a monolithic object. Eugenia appears to be almost anhydrous. Lightcurve analysis indicates that Eugenia's pole most likely points towards ecliptic coordinates (β, λ) = (−30°, 124°) with a 10-degree uncertainty, which gives it an axial tilt of 117°. Eugenia's rotation is then retrograde, rotating backward to its orbital plane.

== Satellite system ==
=== Petit-Prince ===
In November 1998, astronomers at the Canada–France–Hawaii Telescope on Mauna Kea, Hawaii, discovered a small moon orbiting Eugenia. This was the first time an asteroid moon had been discovered by a ground-based telescope. The moon is much smaller than Eugenia, about 13 km in diameter, and takes five days to complete an orbit around it.

The discoverers chose the name "Petit-Prince" (or to disambiguate, "(45) Eugenia I Petit-Prince"). The name refers to Empress Eugénie's son, Prince Imperial Louis-Napoléon. However, the discoverers also intended an allusion to the children's novella The Little Prince by Antoine de Saint-Exupéry, which is about a young prince who lives on an asteroid.

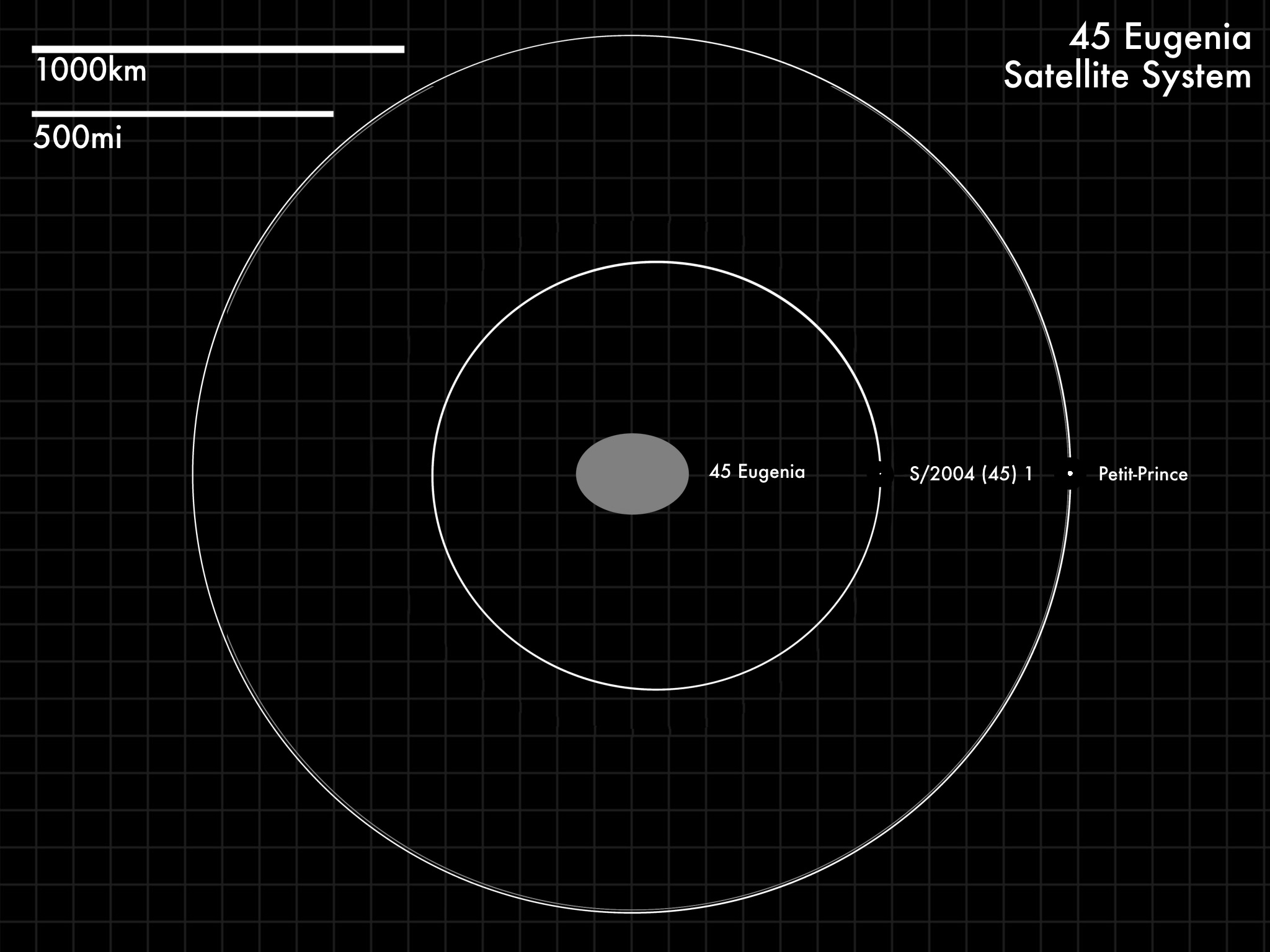
Visual depiction of the orbits of Petit-Prince and S/2004 (45) 1 around 45 Eugenia

=== S/2004 (45) 1 ===
A second, smaller (estimated diameter of 6 km) satellite that orbits closer to Eugenia than does Petit-Prince was discovered in 2004. It is provisionally named S/2004 (45) 1 and is informally dubbed "Petite-Princesse". It was discovered by analyses of three images acquired in February 2004 from the 8.2 m VLT "Yepun" at the European Southern Observatory (ESO) Cerro Paranal, in Chile. The discovery was announced in IAUC 8817, on 7 March 2007 by Franck Marchis and his IMCCE collaborators.

Moons
Name	Semi-major axis	Diameter	Eccentricity	Inclination	Period
S/2004 (45) 1 (Petite-Princesse)	610 km	6 km	0.11 ± 0.02		1.793d
Petit-Prince	1,164 km	13 km	0.002	8.0°	4.716d

== See also ==
- Dactyl and Ida, another asteroid and asteroid moon system catalogued by astronomers
- 3122 Florence, another dual-moon asteroid confirmed only in September 2017
