= 93 Minerva =

Main-belt asteroid

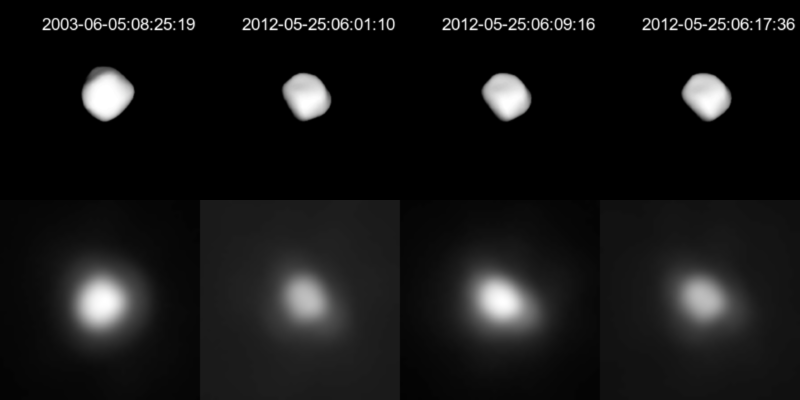
- A three-dimensional model of 93 Minerva based on its light curve on the top and an image of the asteroid on the bottom.

Discovery
- Discovered by: James Craig Watson
- Discovery site: Ann Arbor, Michigan
- Discovery date: 24 August 1867

Designations
- Pronunciation: /mɪˈnɜːrvə/
- Named after: Minerva
- Alternative designations: 1949 QN_{2}, A902 DA
- Minor planet category: Main belt
- Adjectives: Minervian, Minervean /mɪˈnɜːrviən/

Orbital characteristics
- Epoch 31 July 2016 (JD 2457600.5)
- Uncertainty parameter 0
- Observation arc: 146.14 yr (53379 d)
- Aphelion: 3.1429 AU (470.17 Gm)
- Perihelion: 2.3711 AU (354.71 Gm)
- Semi-major axis: 2.7570 AU (412.44 Gm)
- Eccentricity: 0.13998
- Orbital period (sidereal): 4.58 yr (1672.0 d)
- Average orbital speed: ~17.86 km/s
- Mean anomaly: 262.022°
- Mean motion: 0° 12^{m} 55.116^{s} / day
- Inclination: 8.56143°
- Longitude of ascending node: 4.06265°
- Argument of perihelion: 274.543°

Physical characteristics
- Mean diameter: 159±3 km (AO)
- Mass: (3.35±0.54)×10^{18} kg (3.42±0.19)×10^{18} kg (Note: Calculated from its standard gravitational parameter GM = 0.228±0.013 km^{3}/s^{2}.)
- Mean density: 1.59±0.27 g/cm^{3} 1.63±0.13 g/cm^{3}
- Equatorial surface gravity: 4.139 cm/s^{2} (0.004221 g)
- Equatorial escape velocity: 81 m/s
- Synodic rotation period: 5.981768 h (0.2492403 d)
- Pole ecliptic longitude: 20° ± 3°
- Pole ecliptic latitude: 21° ± 4°
- Geometric albedo: 0.062±0.013; 0.056±0.008
- Spectral type: CU (Tholen); C (SMASS II)
- Absolute magnitude (H): 7.7 ± 0.2; 7.88

93 Minerva is a large triple main-belt asteroid. It is a C-type asteroid, meaning that it has a dark surface and possibly a primitive carbonaceous composition. It was discovered by J. C. Watson on 24 August 1867, and named after Minerva, the Roman equivalent of Athena, goddess of wisdom. An occultation of a star by Minerva was observed in France, Spain and the United States on 22 November 1982. An occultation diameter of ~170 km was measured from the observations. Since then two more occultations have been observed, which give an estimated mean diameter of ~150 km.

== Satellites ==
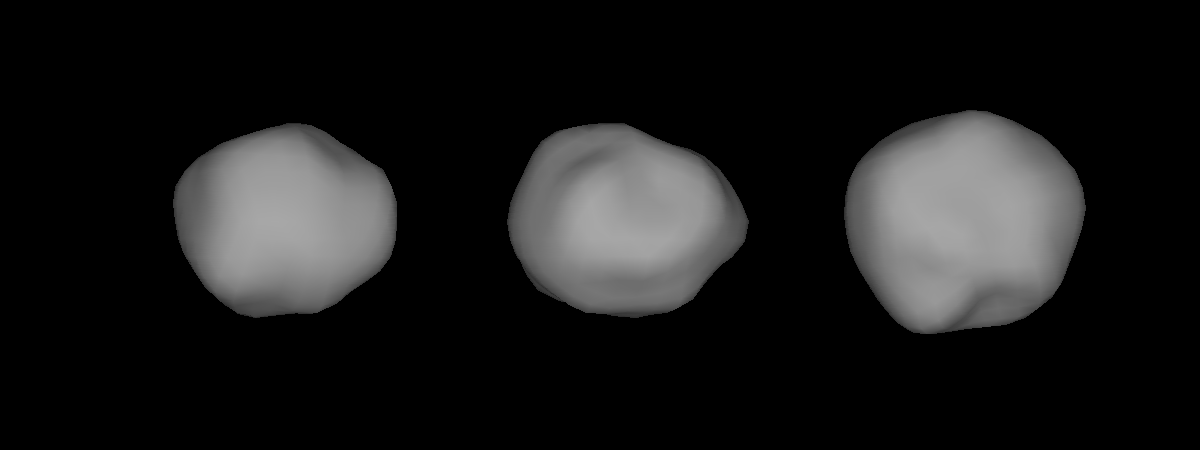
93 Minerva Lightcurve model.

On 16 August 2009, at 13:36 UT, the Keck Observatory's adaptive optics system revealed that the asteroid 93 Minerva possesses 2 small moons. They are 4 and 3 km in diameter and the projected separations from Minerva correspond to 630 km (8.8 x Rprimary) and 380 km (5.2 x Rprimary) respectively. They have been named Aegis (/ˈiːdʒɪs/) and Gorgoneion (/ˌɡɔːrɡəˈnaɪən/).
