= 130 Elektra =

Asteroid with 3 moons

- VLT-SPHERE adaptive optics image of Elektra taken on 5 August 2019

Discovery
- Discovered by: C. H. F. Peters
- Discovery site: Litchfield Obs.
- Discovery date: 17 February 1873

Designations
- Pronunciation: /ɪˈlɛktrə/
- Named after: Electra
- Alternative designations: A873 DA
- Minor planet category: main-belt · (outer) background
- Adjectives: Elektrian /ɪˈlɛktriən/

Orbital characteristics
- Epoch 1 July 2021 (JD 2459396.5)
- Uncertainty parameter 0
- Observation arc: 127.53 yr (46,582 d)
- Aphelion: 3.7808 AU
- Perihelion: 2.4725 AU
- Semi-major axis: 3.1266 AU
- Eccentricity: 0.20923
- Orbital period (sidereal): 5.53 yr (2,019 d)
- Mean anomaly: 87.758°
- Mean motion: 0° 10^{m} 41.79^{s} / day
- Inclination: 22.782°
- Longitude of ascending node: 145.009°
- Argument of perihelion: 237.588°
- Known satellites: 3

Physical characteristics
- Dimensions: 273 × 230 × 151 km
- Mean diameter: 202.3±2 km
- Volume: (4.3±0.1)×10^{6} km^{3}
- Mass: 6.606+0.007 −0.013×10^{18} kg
- Mean density: 1.536±0.038 g/cm^{3}
- Synodic rotation period: 5.224664 h
- Axial tilt: 156°
- Pole ecliptic longitude: 188.3°±2.6°
- Pole ecliptic latitude: −88.2°±0.2°
- Geometric albedo: 0.067 (calculated); 0.086±0.015 (NEOWISE); 0.0755±0.0110 (IRAS)
- Spectral type: G (Tholen); Ch (SMASS)
- Absolute magnitude (H): 7.47 · 7.21 · 7.05

130 Elektra is a large outer main-belt asteroid and quadruple system with three minor-planet moons. It was discovered on 17 February 1873 by astronomer Christian Peters at Litchfield Observatory, New York, and named after Electra, an avenger in Greek mythology.

== Description ==
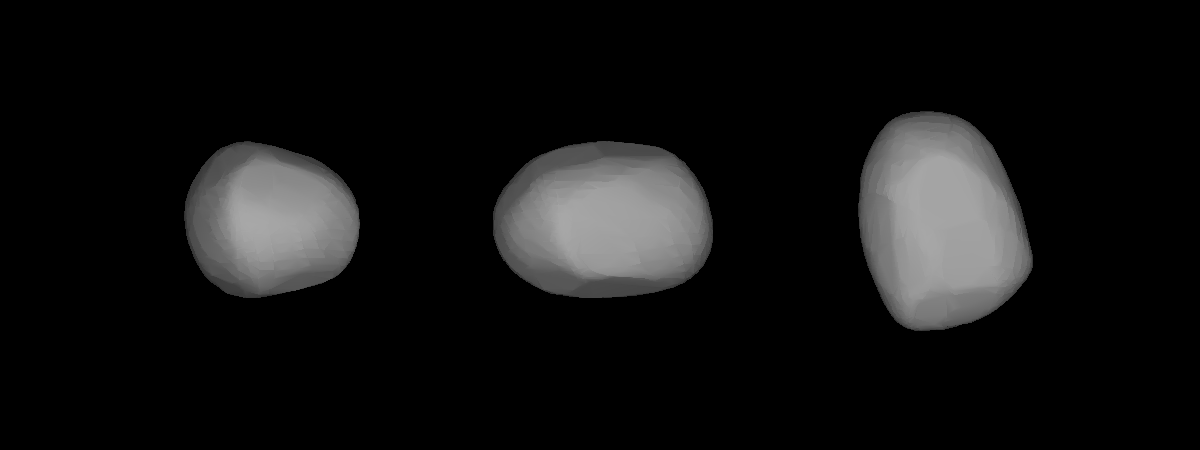
Lightcurve-based 3D-model of (130) Elektra

(130) Elektra has the spectrum of a G-type asteroid; hence it probably has a Ceres-like surface. Spectral signatures of organic compounds have been seen on Elektra's surface and it displays evidence of aqueous alteration.

In the late 1990s, a network of astronomers worldwide gathered lightcurve data that was ultimately used to derive the spin states and shape models of 10 new asteroids, including (130) Elektra. The light curve of (130) Elektra forms a double sinusoid while the shape model is elongated and the derived rotation axis is perpendicular to the plane of the ecliptic.

Optical observations have found three satellites of this asteroid. Once the orbits are known, Elektra's mass can be reliably found. The value of 6.6 × 10^{18} kg indicates a density of 1.3 ± 0.3 g/cm³. Optical observations have also determined that Elektra's shape is quite irregular, as well as giving indications of albedo differences of 5–15% on its surface.

== Occultations ==
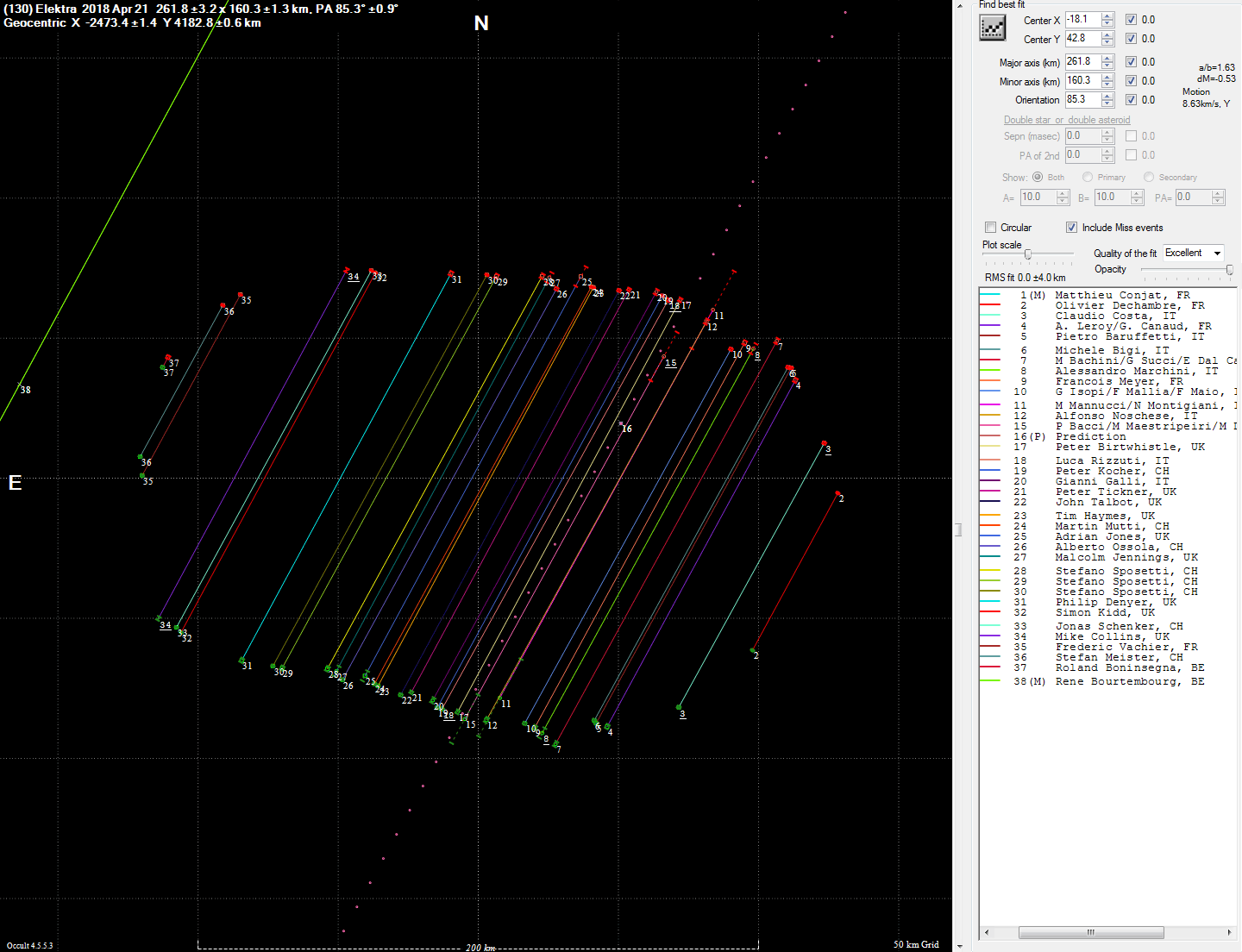
Occultation profile of Elektra as observed from Europe on 21 April 2018

Elektra has been observed to pass in front of a dozen stars since 2007, most notably on 21 April 2018 when over 30 mostly citizen astronomers spread across five European countries recorded the sudden drop in light of an 11th magnitude star. The sky-plane plot of the chords reveals a peanut-shaped body, possibly the result of a two-body merger early in the history of the Solar System.

== Satellites ==
Elektra has three orbiting natural satellites, all of which are unnamed and measure a few kilometres across. Together with the primary body Elektra, they comprise a quadruple system. Given their similar spectra, these satellites are thought to be fragments of Elektra that were created from a disruptive impact. As of November 2021, Elektra has the most satellites of any main-belt asteroid, and is the only known quadruple asteroid system in the Solar System. All three satellites are faint and orbit closely to Elektra, which makes them difficult to observe due to Elektra's bright glare obscuring them. The largest telescopes with adaptive optics systems and advanced image processing techniques are required for detailed study of the satellites' properties.

Moons of Elektra ("Alpha")
Name	Discovered	Announced	Diameter (km)	Semi-major axis (km)	Orbital period (d)	Eccentricity	Inclination (°) (Note: With respect to the celestial equator)	Ascending node (°)	Arg. of perihelion (°)	Mean anomaly (°)
undesignated ("Delta") (Note: Inner moon of Elektra unofficially called "Delta" or S/2014 (130) 2 by G. Valvano et al. (2023).)	2014-12-09	2021-11-06	1.6±0.4	344±5	0.679±0.001	0.33±0.05	129±24	127±18	23±11	—
S/2014 (130) 1 ("Gamma")	2014-12-06	2014-12-16	2.0±0.4	501±7	1.192±0.002	0.03±0.03	156±7	187±10	235±18	—
S/2003 (130) 1 ("Beta")	2003-08-15	2003-08-17	6.0±0.6	1297.58±0.54	5.287±0.001	0.0835±0.0096	160.21±1.50	176.1±5.7	184.4±14.1	117.3±11.7

=== S/2003 (130) 1 ("Beta") ===
S/2003 (130) 1 ("Beta") is the largest and outermost satellite of Elektra, around 6 km (3.7 mi) in diameter, assuming the same albedo as the primary. It was discovered on 15 August 2003, by a team of astronomers led by W. J. Merline using the Keck II telescope at the Mauna Kea Observatory in Hawaii. The discovery images showed that the satellite had an apparent magnitude difference of 8.5 in the near-infrared K-band. The team confirmed the existence of the satellite after reobserving it with the Keck II telescope on 17 August 2003. The discovery was announced on that same day and the satellite was given the provisional designation S/2003 (130) 1.

S/2003 (130) 1 orbits 1,300 km (810 mi) from Elektra with a period of 5.3 days. Its orbit has a moderate eccentricity of 0.08 and an inclination of 160° with respect to the celestial equator. Preliminary simulations of the Elektra system show that S/2003 (130) 1's semi-major axis oscillates less than 1.4 km (0.87 mi) over 20 years. Near-infrared observations from December 2014 show that S/2003 (130) 1 along with S/2014 (130) 1 display a similar spectrum to Elektra, supporting the hypothesis that they are fragments from a disruptive collision.

=== S/2014 (130) 1 ("Gamma") ===
Moving image of 130 Elektra's 3 moons. The orange orbit is of S/2003 (130) 1, while the green and blue orbits are of S/2014 (130) 1 and the inner moon respectively.

S/2014 (130) 1 ("Gamma") is the second satellite of Elektra by distance and order of discovery. It was discovered on 6 December 2014, by a team of astronomers led by B. Yang using the SPHERE adaptive optics system on the Very Large Telescope's Melipal (UT3) telescope at Cerro Paranal, Chile. Discovery observations showed that the satellite had a near-infrared magnitude difference of 10, corresponding to a diameter of about 2 km (1.2 mi) if it has the same albedo as the primary. The discovery was announced on 16 December 2014, but the satellite was mistakenly designated S/2014 (130) 2 before being immediately corrected to S/2014 (130) 1.

S/2014 (130) 1 orbits 500 km (310 mi) from Elektra with a period of 1.2 days—about two and a half times closer and four times quicker than the outer satellite S/2003 (130) 1. Its roughly-circular orbit is inclined 156° with respect to the celestial equator. Preliminary simulations of the Elektra system show that S/2014 (130) 1's semi-major axis oscillates less than 100 m (330 ft) over 20 years. Near-infrared observations from December 2014 show that S/2014 (130) 1 along with S/2003 (130) 1 display a similar spectrum to Elektra.

=== Inner satellite ("Delta") ===
On 6 November 2021, astronomers A. Berdeu, M. Langlois, and F. Vachier reported the discovery of a third, closer-in satellite in archival VLT-SPHERE images taken between 9 and 31 December 2014, making Elektra the first quadruple system discovered and imaged in the main asteroid belt. This third satellite does not have an officially assigned provisional designation, but is sometimes unofficially called "Delta" or "S/2014 (130) 2". It had eluded discovery when the images were taken, due to its faintness and close proximity to Elektra's bright glare. For these reasons, it had to be measured through image subtraction of Elektra's glare. The satellite measures roughly 1.6 km (1 mi) in diameter, based on a near-infrared magnitude difference of 10.5. The satellite has been identified in later VLT images from February 2016 and July–August 2019.

With a semi-major axis of 344 km (214 mi) and an orbital period of 0.68 days (16 h), it is the innermost companion of the Elektra system. In contrast to the two outer satellites, its orbit is remarkably eccentric and inclined; it has a high eccentricity of 0.33 and an inclination about 38° with respect to Elektra's spin axis (129° with respect to the celestial equator). The satellite's close proximity to Elektra makes its orbit subject to perturbations by shape-induced irregularities in Elektra's gravitational field (see geopotential model), which may account for most of the uncertainties in its Keplerian orbit.
