= List of minor planets: 672001–673000 =

The following is a partial list of minor planets, running from minor-planet number 672001 through 673000, inclusive. The primary data for this and other partial lists is based on JPL's "Small-Body Orbital Elements" and data available from the Minor Planet Center. Critical list information is also provided by the MPC, unless otherwise specified from Lowell Observatory. A detailed description of the table's columns and additional sources are given on the main page including a complete list of every page in this series, and a statistical break-up on the dynamical classification of minor planets.

Also see the summary list of all named bodies in numerical and alphabetical order, and the corresponding naming citations for the number range of this particular list. New namings may only be added to this list after official publication, as the preannouncement of names is condemned by the Working Group for Small Bodies Nomenclature of the International Astronomical Union.

Near-Earth obj.	MBA (inner)	MBA (outer)	Centaur
Mars-crosser	MBA (middle)	Jupiter trojan	Trans-Neptunian obj.
Unclassified

== 672001–672100 ==
Designation			Discovery			Properties		Ref
Permanent	Provisional	Named after	Date	Site	Discoverer(s)	Category	Diam.	Ref
672001	2014 QC_{358}	—	July 29, 2014	Haleakala	Pan-STARRS 1	JUN	820 m	MPC · JPL
672002	2014 QK_{359}	—	September 16, 2010	Mount Lemmon	Mount Lemmon Survey	·	950 m	MPC · JPL
672003	2014 QB_{360}	—	September 30, 2003	Kitt Peak	Spacewatch	·	2.1 km	MPC · JPL
672004	2014 QQ_{361}	—	July 29, 2014	Haleakala	Pan-STARRS 1	·	1.3 km	MPC · JPL
672005	2014 QT_{361}	—	April 27, 2012	Haleakala	Pan-STARRS 1	EOS	1.4 km	MPC · JPL
672006	2014 QE_{362}	—	August 29, 2014	Mount Lemmon	Mount Lemmon Survey	PHO	790 m	MPC · JPL
672007	2014 QD_{363}	—	June 30, 2014	Haleakala	Pan-STARRS 1	H	410 m	MPC · JPL
672008	2014 QU_{365}	—	July 31, 2014	Haleakala	Pan-STARRS 1	·	880 m	MPC · JPL
672009	2014 QB_{366}	—	August 27, 2014	Haleakala	Pan-STARRS 1	·	830 m	MPC · JPL
672010	2014 QM_{366}	—	August 25, 2014	Haleakala	Pan-STARRS 1	·	990 m	MPC · JPL
672011	2014 QU_{366}	—	August 25, 2014	Haleakala	Pan-STARRS 1	·	1.2 km	MPC · JPL
672012	2014 QH_{367}	—	December 3, 2010	Kitt Peak	Spacewatch	·	1.0 km	MPC · JPL
672013	2014 QM_{369}	—	February 18, 2002	Cerro Tololo	Deep Lens Survey	NYS	1.1 km	MPC · JPL
672014	2014 QL_{372}	—	July 31, 2014	Haleakala	Pan-STARRS 1	MAR	600 m	MPC · JPL
672015	2014 QX_{375}	—	September 16, 2003	Kitt Peak	Spacewatch	·	1.9 km	MPC · JPL
672016	2014 QO_{376}	—	August 27, 2014	Haleakala	Pan-STARRS 1	·	810 m	MPC · JPL
672017	2014 QQ_{376}	—	April 7, 2007	Mount Lemmon	Mount Lemmon Survey	·	2.1 km	MPC · JPL
672018	2014 QY_{376}	—	March 26, 2007	Mount Lemmon	Mount Lemmon Survey	EOS	1.7 km	MPC · JPL
672019	2014 QC_{377}	—	February 21, 2012	Kitt Peak	Spacewatch	·	3.6 km	MPC · JPL
672020	2014 QF_{379}	—	July 31, 2014	Haleakala	Pan-STARRS 1	·	980 m	MPC · JPL
672021	2014 QY_{384}	—	September 14, 2007	Mount Lemmon	Mount Lemmon Survey	NYS	660 m	MPC · JPL
672022	2014 QS_{387}	—	February 11, 2011	Mount Lemmon	Mount Lemmon Survey	·	2.5 km	MPC · JPL
672023	2014 QJ_{389}	—	September 16, 2009	Mount Lemmon	Mount Lemmon Survey	·	2.1 km	MPC · JPL
672024	2014 QQ_{390}	—	August 29, 2014	Mount Lemmon	Mount Lemmon Survey	H	420 m	MPC · JPL
672025	2014 QT_{390}	—	January 28, 2007	Catalina	CSS	·	1.5 km	MPC · JPL
672026	2014 QZ_{393}	—	September 30, 2003	Kitt Peak	Spacewatch	·	2.3 km	MPC · JPL
672027	2014 QO_{398}	—	February 8, 2008	Kitt Peak	Spacewatch	·	880 m	MPC · JPL
672028	2014 QS_{403}	—	October 21, 2009	Mount Lemmon	Mount Lemmon Survey	·	3.4 km	MPC · JPL
672029	2014 QC_{405}	—	July 7, 2010	Kitt Peak	Spacewatch	·	1.3 km	MPC · JPL
672030	2014 QW_{406}	—	September 11, 2007	Mount Lemmon	Mount Lemmon Survey	·	500 m	MPC · JPL
672031	2014 QE_{410}	—	September 29, 2003	Kitt Peak	Spacewatch	·	1 km	MPC · JPL
672032	2014 QJ_{411}	—	February 10, 2007	Mount Lemmon	Mount Lemmon Survey	·	2.2 km	MPC · JPL
672033	2014 QC_{414}	—	May 15, 2013	Haleakala	Pan-STARRS 1	·	2.8 km	MPC · JPL
672034	2014 QJ_{414}	—	April 11, 2008	Mount Lemmon	Mount Lemmon Survey	·	1.8 km	MPC · JPL
672035	2014 QL_{417}	—	September 30, 2003	Kitt Peak	Spacewatch	·	2.0 km	MPC · JPL
672036	2014 QC_{419}	—	August 24, 2007	Kitt Peak	Spacewatch	·	550 m	MPC · JPL
672037	2014 QD_{421}	—	November 2, 2010	Mount Lemmon	Mount Lemmon Survey	·	910 m	MPC · JPL
672038	2014 QP_{424}	—	August 31, 2014	Mount Lemmon	Mount Lemmon Survey	EOS	1.6 km	MPC · JPL
672039	2014 QO_{425}	—	February 2, 2006	Bergisch Gladbach	W. Bickel	·	2.4 km	MPC · JPL
672040	2014 QQ_{428}	—	August 6, 2014	Haleakala	Pan-STARRS 1	(194)	1.0 km	MPC · JPL
672041	2014 QC_{429}	—	September 24, 2011	Mount Lemmon	Mount Lemmon Survey	·	890 m	MPC · JPL
672042	2014 QQ_{430}	—	March 15, 2012	Kitt Peak	Spacewatch	·	1.6 km	MPC · JPL
672043	2014 QS_{436}	—	August 30, 2014	Mayhill-ISON	L. Elenin	·	1.2 km	MPC · JPL
672044	2014 QH_{438}	—	October 7, 2008	Kitt Peak	Spacewatch	·	2.2 km	MPC · JPL
672045	2014 QJ_{438}	—	August 31, 2014	Haleakala	Pan-STARRS 1	·	1.1 km	MPC · JPL
672046	2014 QC_{439}	—	August 31, 2014	Haleakala	Pan-STARRS 1	·	1.0 km	MPC · JPL
672047	2014 QW_{439}	—	December 5, 2010	Mount Lemmon	Mount Lemmon Survey	·	3.3 km	MPC · JPL
672048	2014 QH_{440}	—	June 28, 2014	Mount Lemmon	Mount Lemmon Survey	·	2.9 km	MPC · JPL
672049	2014 QM_{440}	—	September 30, 2009	Mount Lemmon	Mount Lemmon Survey	·	2.9 km	MPC · JPL
672050	2014 QK_{447}	—	February 3, 2011	Sandlot	G. Hug	TIR	3.0 km	MPC · JPL
672051	2014 QZ_{448}	—	September 29, 2003	Kitt Peak	Spacewatch	·	1.1 km	MPC · JPL
672052	2014 QR_{450}	—	March 25, 2007	Mount Lemmon	Mount Lemmon Survey	·	2.6 km	MPC · JPL
672053	2014 QS_{453}	—	December 17, 1999	Kitt Peak	Spacewatch	EOS	1.9 km	MPC · JPL
672054	2014 QC_{454}	—	April 12, 2013	Haleakala	Pan-STARRS 1	·	910 m	MPC · JPL
672055	2014 QH_{454}	—	October 2, 2009	Mount Lemmon	Mount Lemmon Survey	·	2.3 km	MPC · JPL
672056	2014 QX_{454}	—	May 8, 2013	Haleakala	Pan-STARRS 1	·	2.4 km	MPC · JPL
672057	2014 QH_{455}	—	October 27, 2009	Kitt Peak	Spacewatch	EOS	2.1 km	MPC · JPL
672058	2014 QD_{456}	—	August 31, 2014	Kitt Peak	Spacewatch	·	1.6 km	MPC · JPL
672059	2014 QO_{457}	—	August 28, 2014	Haleakala	Pan-STARRS 1	·	2.3 km	MPC · JPL
672060	2014 QT_{457}	—	August 30, 2014	Haleakala	Pan-STARRS 1	·	3.2 km	MPC · JPL
672061	2014 QK_{459}	—	August 20, 2014	Haleakala	Pan-STARRS 1	HOF	1.8 km	MPC · JPL
672062	2014 QO_{463}	—	October 23, 2003	Apache Point	SDSS Collaboration	·	3.1 km	MPC · JPL
672063	2014 QH_{465}	—	August 23, 2014	Haleakala	Pan-STARRS 1	MAR	780 m	MPC · JPL
672064	2014 QP_{465}	—	August 23, 2014	Haleakala	Pan-STARRS 1	·	1.9 km	MPC · JPL
672065	2014 QW_{465}	—	August 18, 2009	Kitt Peak	Spacewatch	KOR	1.1 km	MPC · JPL
672066	2014 QE_{467}	—	January 16, 2005	Kitt Peak	Spacewatch	·	2.9 km	MPC · JPL
672067	2014 QV_{467}	—	August 27, 2014	Haleakala	Pan-STARRS 1	·	1.5 km	MPC · JPL
672068	2014 QY_{468}	—	May 3, 2008	Kitt Peak	Spacewatch	·	1.4 km	MPC · JPL
672069	2014 QQ_{471}	—	August 30, 2014	Haleakala	Pan-STARRS 1	·	2.1 km	MPC · JPL
672070	2014 QV_{471}	—	April 15, 2012	Haleakala	Pan-STARRS 1	·	2.8 km	MPC · JPL
672071	2014 QR_{472}	—	September 17, 2010	Mount Lemmon	Mount Lemmon Survey	·	930 m	MPC · JPL
672072	2014 QZ_{472}	—	August 31, 2014	Haleakala	Pan-STARRS 1	·	730 m	MPC · JPL
672073	2014 QD_{475}	—	January 13, 2011	Mount Lemmon	Mount Lemmon Survey	·	3.1 km	MPC · JPL
672074	2014 QA_{476}	—	December 13, 2006	Mount Lemmon	Mount Lemmon Survey	·	2.6 km	MPC · JPL
672075	2014 QV_{476}	—	May 4, 2002	Kitt Peak	Spacewatch	EOS	1.4 km	MPC · JPL
672076	2014 QZ_{476}	—	August 6, 2014	Haleakala	Pan-STARRS 1	·	2.1 km	MPC · JPL
672077	2014 QA_{478}	—	August 3, 2014	Haleakala	Pan-STARRS 1	EOS	1.5 km	MPC · JPL
672078	2014 QS_{478}	—	July 30, 2014	Kitt Peak	Spacewatch	T_{j} (2.99) · EUP	2.3 km	MPC · JPL
672079	2014 QE_{479}	—	August 4, 2014	Haleakala	Pan-STARRS 1	·	3.1 km	MPC · JPL
672080	2014 QS_{480}	—	March 2, 2006	Kitt Peak	Spacewatch	·	2.7 km	MPC · JPL
672081	2014 QQ_{486}	—	March 19, 2010	Mount Lemmon	Mount Lemmon Survey	·	620 m	MPC · JPL
672082	2014 QT_{486}	—	July 31, 2014	Haleakala	Pan-STARRS 1	·	790 m	MPC · JPL
672083	2014 QL_{487}	—	September 18, 2004	Socorro	LINEAR	·	3.7 km	MPC · JPL
672084	2014 QE_{494}	—	September 11, 2010	Mount Lemmon	Mount Lemmon Survey	·	730 m	MPC · JPL
672085	2014 QN_{494}	—	September 5, 2008	Kitt Peak	Spacewatch	·	2.9 km	MPC · JPL
672086	2014 QD_{496}	—	August 27, 2014	Haleakala	Pan-STARRS 1	T_{j} (2.98)	2.8 km	MPC · JPL
672087	2014 QU_{496}	—	August 28, 2014	Haleakala	Pan-STARRS 1	EOS	1.5 km	MPC · JPL
672088	2014 QV_{496}	—	August 28, 2014	Haleakala	Pan-STARRS 1	·	3.0 km	MPC · JPL
672089	2014 QH_{497}	—	August 18, 2014	Haleakala	Pan-STARRS 1	H	440 m	MPC · JPL
672090	2014 QJ_{498}	—	August 28, 2014	Haleakala	Pan-STARRS 1	·	970 m	MPC · JPL
672091	2014 QU_{504}	—	August 26, 2014	Haleakala	Pan-STARRS 1	PHO	690 m	MPC · JPL
672092	2014 QX_{508}	—	August 28, 2014	Haleakala	Pan-STARRS 1	(883)	590 m	MPC · JPL
672093	2014 QF_{517}	—	August 25, 2014	Haleakala	Pan-STARRS 1	PHO	800 m	MPC · JPL
672094	2014 QP_{518}	—	August 27, 2014	Haleakala	Pan-STARRS 1	·	2.0 km	MPC · JPL
672095	2014 QL_{521}	—	August 30, 2014	Mount Lemmon	Mount Lemmon Survey	·	1.3 km	MPC · JPL
672096	2014 QF_{523}	—	August 20, 2014	Haleakala	Pan-STARRS 1	·	820 m	MPC · JPL
672097	2014 QK_{523}	—	March 6, 2011	Mount Lemmon	Mount Lemmon Survey	·	2.6 km	MPC · JPL
672098	2014 QE_{524}	—	August 23, 2014	Haleakala	Pan-STARRS 1	PHO	730 m	MPC · JPL
672099	2014 QN_{528}	—	January 25, 2011	Mount Lemmon	Mount Lemmon Survey	·	2.6 km	MPC · JPL
672100	2014 QY_{528}	—	August 16, 2014	Haleakala	Pan-STARRS 1	PHO	820 m	MPC · JPL

== 672101–672200 ==
back to top

Designation			Discovery			Properties		Ref
Permanent	Provisional	Named after	Date	Site	Discoverer(s)	Category	Diam.	Ref
672101	2014 QV_{530}	—	August 22, 2014	Haleakala	Pan-STARRS 1	PHO	940 m	MPC · JPL
672102	2014 QV_{532}	—	August 30, 2014	Haleakala	Pan-STARRS 1	·	610 m	MPC · JPL
672103	2014 QY_{533}	—	August 28, 2014	Haleakala	Pan-STARRS 1	·	2.8 km	MPC · JPL
672104	2014 QO_{535}	—	August 22, 2014	Haleakala	Pan-STARRS 1	·	2.2 km	MPC · JPL
672105	2014 QA_{542}	—	August 25, 2014	ESA OGS	ESA OGS	·	790 m	MPC · JPL
672106	2014 QL_{546}	—	September 20, 2009	Kitt Peak	Spacewatch	H	370 m	MPC · JPL
672107	2014 QP_{551}	—	August 26, 2014	Haleakala	Pan-STARRS 1	MAR	750 m	MPC · JPL
672108	2014 QD_{564}	—	August 20, 2014	Haleakala	Pan-STARRS 1	·	510 m	MPC · JPL
672109	2014 RG_{2}	—	September 21, 2009	Kitt Peak	Spacewatch	·	3.1 km	MPC · JPL
672110	2014 RT_{2}	—	October 10, 2007	Mount Lemmon	Mount Lemmon Survey	3:2	4.1 km	MPC · JPL
672111	2014 RW_{5}	—	September 1, 2014	Mount Lemmon	Mount Lemmon Survey	EOS	1.4 km	MPC · JPL
672112	2014 RJ_{6}	—	August 25, 2014	Haleakala	Pan-STARRS 1	·	1.6 km	MPC · JPL
672113	2014 RM_{6}	—	December 2, 2010	Mount Lemmon	Mount Lemmon Survey	·	1.1 km	MPC · JPL
672114	2014 RY_{6}	—	October 8, 2008	Mount Lemmon	Mount Lemmon Survey	·	3.0 km	MPC · JPL
672115	2014 RT_{9}	—	April 16, 2012	Haleakala	Pan-STARRS 1	·	2.8 km	MPC · JPL
672116	2014 RL_{10}	—	October 9, 2007	Kitt Peak	Spacewatch	·	700 m	MPC · JPL
672117	2014 RN_{12}	—	February 13, 2011	Mount Lemmon	Mount Lemmon Survey	·	1.1 km	MPC · JPL
672118	2014 RP_{13}	—	February 27, 2012	Haleakala	Pan-STARRS 1	VER	2.8 km	MPC · JPL
672119	2014 RB_{15}	—	February 21, 2007	Mount Lemmon	Mount Lemmon Survey	·	2.8 km	MPC · JPL
672120	2014 RH_{15}	—	August 6, 2014	Haleakala	Pan-STARRS 1	·	700 m	MPC · JPL
672121	2014 RM_{19}	—	August 25, 2014	Haleakala	Pan-STARRS 1	H	420 m	MPC · JPL
672122	2014 RQ_{22}	—	September 4, 2010	Sternwarte Hagen	Tiedtke, J., Klein, M.	·	1.1 km	MPC · JPL
672123	2014 RA_{23}	—	September 14, 2014	Haleakala	Pan-STARRS 1	·	900 m	MPC · JPL
672124	2014 RL_{26}	—	October 13, 1999	Apache Point	SDSS Collaboration	·	1.9 km	MPC · JPL
672125	2014 RM_{31}	—	April 5, 2003	Kitt Peak	Spacewatch	·	2.1 km	MPC · JPL
672126	2014 RK_{32}	—	September 11, 2007	Mount Lemmon	Mount Lemmon Survey	·	490 m	MPC · JPL
672127	2014 RM_{32}	—	October 23, 2004	Kitt Peak	Spacewatch	·	2.2 km	MPC · JPL
672128	2014 RP_{36}	—	March 21, 2001	Kitt Peak	Spacewatch	·	3.5 km	MPC · JPL
672129	2014 RQ_{36}	—	November 30, 2005	Kitt Peak	Spacewatch	KOR	1.4 km	MPC · JPL
672130	2014 RS_{36}	—	August 20, 2014	Haleakala	Pan-STARRS 1	·	2.5 km	MPC · JPL
672131	2014 RL_{37}	—	May 11, 2007	Kitt Peak	Spacewatch	·	2.7 km	MPC · JPL
672132	2014 RV_{37}	—	February 22, 2001	Kitt Peak	Spacewatch	EOS	2.0 km	MPC · JPL
672133	2014 RY_{37}	—	January 26, 2011	Mount Lemmon	Mount Lemmon Survey	·	2.3 km	MPC · JPL
672134	2014 RT_{38}	—	September 19, 2009	Kitt Peak	Spacewatch	·	1.5 km	MPC · JPL
672135	2014 RR_{41}	—	July 31, 2014	Haleakala	Pan-STARRS 1	·	2.8 km	MPC · JPL
672136	2014 RA_{42}	—	August 31, 2014	Mount Lemmon	Mount Lemmon Survey	·	550 m	MPC · JPL
672137	2014 RG_{43}	—	January 16, 2011	Mount Lemmon	Mount Lemmon Survey	·	3.2 km	MPC · JPL
672138	2014 RZ_{43}	—	February 14, 2005	Kitt Peak	Spacewatch	·	3.6 km	MPC · JPL
672139	2014 RL_{44}	—	February 1, 2006	Kitt Peak	Spacewatch	EOS	2.0 km	MPC · JPL
672140	2014 RP_{45}	—	April 26, 2006	Mount Lemmon	Mount Lemmon Survey	VER	2.7 km	MPC · JPL
672141	2014 RS_{45}	—	May 24, 2001	Apache Point	SDSS Collaboration	·	2.7 km	MPC · JPL
672142	2014 RT_{45}	—	October 1, 2000	Kitt Peak	Spacewatch	GEF	920 m	MPC · JPL
672143	2014 RP_{48}	—	September 29, 2003	Kitt Peak	Spacewatch	EOS	2.2 km	MPC · JPL
672144	2014 RQ_{50}	—	September 14, 2014	Mount Lemmon	Mount Lemmon Survey	·	1.0 km	MPC · JPL
672145	2014 RG_{51}	—	June 2, 2014	Haleakala	Pan-STARRS 1	(2076)	600 m	MPC · JPL
672146	2014 RA_{61}	—	July 25, 2003	Socorro	LINEAR	·	850 m	MPC · JPL
672147	2014 RW_{63}	—	September 2, 2014	Haleakala	Pan-STARRS 1	H	390 m	MPC · JPL
672148	2014 RY_{63}	—	August 31, 2014	Haleakala	Pan-STARRS 1	H	420 m	MPC · JPL
672149	2014 RR_{65}	—	April 13, 2013	Haleakala	Pan-STARRS 1	·	1.7 km	MPC · JPL
672150	2014 RY_{65}	—	September 15, 1998	Kitt Peak	Spacewatch	·	2.1 km	MPC · JPL
672151	2014 RT_{66}	—	October 24, 2009	Mount Lemmon	Mount Lemmon Survey	·	1.7 km	MPC · JPL
672152	2014 RU_{66}	—	September 16, 2003	Kitt Peak	Spacewatch	·	2.5 km	MPC · JPL
672153	2014 RG_{68}	—	September 4, 2014	Haleakala	Pan-STARRS 1	·	2.4 km	MPC · JPL
672154	2014 RR_{68}	—	September 4, 2014	Haleakala	Pan-STARRS 1	EUN	810 m	MPC · JPL
672155	2014 RN_{70}	—	September 14, 2014	Haleakala	Pan-STARRS 1	H	350 m	MPC · JPL
672156	2014 RK_{73}	—	September 14, 2014	Kitt Peak	Spacewatch	·	880 m	MPC · JPL
672157	2014 RV_{76}	—	September 2, 2014	Haleakala	Pan-STARRS 1	·	870 m	MPC · JPL
672158	2014 RN_{82}	—	September 14, 2014	Haleakala	Pan-STARRS 1	·	840 m	MPC · JPL
672159	2014 RO_{84}	—	September 11, 2014	Haleakala	Pan-STARRS 1	·	960 m	MPC · JPL
672160	2014 SP	—	August 9, 2001	Palomar	NEAT	·	1.5 km	MPC · JPL
672161	2014 SC_{2}	—	September 3, 2007	Catalina	CSS	·	600 m	MPC · JPL
672162	2014 SJ_{2}	—	November 2, 2010	Mount Lemmon	Mount Lemmon Survey	·	1.4 km	MPC · JPL
672163	2014 SG_{4}	—	September 16, 2014	Haleakala	Pan-STARRS 1	·	2.0 km	MPC · JPL
672164	2014 ST_{6}	—	August 22, 2014	Haleakala	Pan-STARRS 1	·	770 m	MPC · JPL
672165	2014 SX_{16}	—	November 17, 1995	Kitt Peak	Spacewatch	·	900 m	MPC · JPL
672166	2014 SJ_{17}	—	August 10, 2007	Kitt Peak	Spacewatch	·	800 m	MPC · JPL
672167	2014 SA_{23}	—	August 20, 2014	Haleakala	Pan-STARRS 1	·	1.2 km	MPC · JPL
672168	2014 SW_{31}	—	September 17, 2014	Haleakala	Pan-STARRS 1	·	1.1 km	MPC · JPL
672169	2014 SY_{31}	—	August 20, 2014	Haleakala	Pan-STARRS 1	·	2.8 km	MPC · JPL
672170	2014 SC_{35}	—	January 10, 2008	Kitt Peak	Spacewatch	·	1.5 km	MPC · JPL
672171	2014 SP_{36}	—	February 28, 2012	Haleakala	Pan-STARRS 1	·	710 m	MPC · JPL
672172	2014 SM_{38}	—	January 2, 2011	Mount Lemmon	Mount Lemmon Survey	EOS	1.7 km	MPC · JPL
672173	2014 ST_{38}	—	November 3, 2010	Mount Lemmon	Mount Lemmon Survey	EOS	1.9 km	MPC · JPL
672174	2014 SR_{40}	—	October 1, 2009	Mount Lemmon	Mount Lemmon Survey	EOS	1.8 km	MPC · JPL
672175	2014 SJ_{46}	—	October 16, 2001	Palomar	NEAT	·	1.4 km	MPC · JPL
672176	2014 SY_{49}	—	March 29, 2001	Kitt Peak	Spacewatch	·	2.8 km	MPC · JPL
672177	2014 SX_{52}	—	February 3, 2012	Haleakala	Pan-STARRS 1	·	1.6 km	MPC · JPL
672178	2014 ST_{57}	—	July 7, 2014	Haleakala	Pan-STARRS 1	·	630 m	MPC · JPL
672179	2014 SA_{63}	—	July 5, 2000	Kitt Peak	Spacewatch	V	450 m	MPC · JPL
672180	2014 SK_{63}	—	September 18, 2014	Haleakala	Pan-STARRS 1	·	960 m	MPC · JPL
672181	2014 SJ_{66}	—	December 3, 2008	Mount Lemmon	Mount Lemmon Survey	·	760 m	MPC · JPL
672182	2014 SA_{70}	—	October 6, 2008	Mount Lemmon	Mount Lemmon Survey	·	4.3 km	MPC · JPL
672183	2014 SK_{70}	—	September 6, 2014	Mount Lemmon	Mount Lemmon Survey	·	1.0 km	MPC · JPL
672184	2014 SF_{73}	—	January 20, 2009	Kitt Peak	Spacewatch	·	910 m	MPC · JPL
672185	2014 SF_{76}	—	January 10, 2011	Mount Lemmon	Mount Lemmon Survey	VER	2.6 km	MPC · JPL
672186	2014 SC_{78}	—	March 12, 2005	Kitt Peak	Deep Ecliptic Survey	PHO	710 m	MPC · JPL
672187	2014 SM_{78}	—	September 28, 2009	Mount Lemmon	Mount Lemmon Survey	·	3.1 km	MPC · JPL
672188	2014 SB_{79}	—	January 21, 2012	Haleakala	Pan-STARRS 1	EOS	1.9 km	MPC · JPL
672189	2014 SF_{79}	—	May 15, 2013	Haleakala	Pan-STARRS 1	·	2.0 km	MPC · JPL
672190	2014 SR_{83}	—	December 4, 2005	Mount Lemmon	Mount Lemmon Survey	·	2.6 km	MPC · JPL
672191	2014 SS_{85}	—	September 18, 2014	Haleakala	Pan-STARRS 1	·	2.0 km	MPC · JPL
672192	2014 SW_{100}	—	January 30, 2011	Mount Lemmon	Mount Lemmon Survey	VER	2.6 km	MPC · JPL
672193	2014 SQ_{107}	—	August 21, 2003	Campo Imperatore	CINEOS	EOS	2.0 km	MPC · JPL
672194	2014 SH_{119}	—	September 30, 2003	Kitt Peak	Spacewatch	·	3.1 km	MPC · JPL
672195	2014 SK_{120}	—	August 6, 2014	Haleakala	Pan-STARRS 1	H	460 m	MPC · JPL
672196	2014 SO_{120}	—	July 27, 2014	Haleakala	Pan-STARRS 1	·	660 m	MPC · JPL
672197	2014 SA_{122}	—	January 19, 2012	Haleakala	Pan-STARRS 1	·	930 m	MPC · JPL
672198	2014 SR_{124}	—	February 3, 2012	Haleakala	Pan-STARRS 1	·	860 m	MPC · JPL
672199	2014 ST_{125}	—	August 25, 2014	Haleakala	Pan-STARRS 1	·	2.2 km	MPC · JPL
672200	2014 SU_{135}	—	August 30, 2003	Kitt Peak	Spacewatch	TIR	2.2 km	MPC · JPL

== 672201–672300 ==
back to top

Designation			Discovery			Properties		Ref
Permanent	Provisional	Named after	Date	Site	Discoverer(s)	Category	Diam.	Ref
672201	2014 SA_{143}	—	September 20, 2014	Haleakala	Pan-STARRS 1	H	420 m	MPC · JPL
672202	2014 SZ_{143}	—	December 23, 2012	Haleakala	Pan-STARRS 1	H	530 m	MPC · JPL
672203	2014 SM_{144}	—	September 20, 2014	Haleakala	Pan-STARRS 1	·	1.2 km	MPC · JPL
672204	2014 SS_{144}	—	June 30, 2014	Haleakala	Pan-STARRS 1	·	1.3 km	MPC · JPL
672205	2014 ST_{144}	—	September 20, 2014	Mount Lemmon	Mount Lemmon Survey	H	420 m	MPC · JPL
672206	2014 SO_{145}	—	January 29, 2012	Kitt Peak	Spacewatch	·	2.0 km	MPC · JPL
672207	2014 SS_{148}	—	November 5, 2010	Mount Lemmon	Mount Lemmon Survey	·	1.2 km	MPC · JPL
672208	2014 SF_{149}	—	February 8, 2011	Mount Lemmon	Mount Lemmon Survey	·	2.8 km	MPC · JPL
672209	2014 SY_{152}	—	August 28, 2014	Haleakala	Pan-STARRS 1	·	990 m	MPC · JPL
672210	2014 SW_{156}	—	November 1, 2007	Kitt Peak	Spacewatch	·	680 m	MPC · JPL
672211	2014 SP_{157}	—	November 19, 2003	Kitt Peak	Spacewatch	·	970 m	MPC · JPL
672212	2014 SC_{159}	—	September 19, 2014	Haleakala	Pan-STARRS 1	·	920 m	MPC · JPL
672213	2014 SL_{160}	—	April 5, 2002	Kitt Peak	Spacewatch	H	490 m	MPC · JPL
672214	2014 SE_{161}	—	November 29, 2003	Kitt Peak	Spacewatch	·	2.7 km	MPC · JPL
672215	2014 SX_{165}	—	November 9, 2009	Kitt Peak	Spacewatch	·	2.4 km	MPC · JPL
672216	2014 SG_{166}	—	July 30, 2008	Kitt Peak	Spacewatch	·	2.5 km	MPC · JPL
672217	2014 SJ_{166}	—	October 16, 2003	Kitt Peak	Spacewatch	·	2.9 km	MPC · JPL
672218	2014 SM_{166}	—	September 19, 2014	Haleakala	Pan-STARRS 1	·	1.2 km	MPC · JPL
672219	2014 SQ_{169}	—	July 1, 2008	Kitt Peak	Spacewatch	·	3.0 km	MPC · JPL
672220	2014 SP_{173}	—	March 26, 2006	Nashville	Clingan, R.	·	880 m	MPC · JPL
672221	2014 SR_{175}	—	September 7, 2004	Kitt Peak	Spacewatch	EOS	2.0 km	MPC · JPL
672222	2014 SN_{178}	—	September 22, 2009	Mount Lemmon	Mount Lemmon Survey	THM	1.7 km	MPC · JPL
672223	2014 SD_{182}	—	December 21, 2008	Mount Lemmon	Mount Lemmon Survey	·	680 m	MPC · JPL
672224	2014 SS_{190}	—	January 10, 2008	Mount Lemmon	Mount Lemmon Survey	·	950 m	MPC · JPL
672225	2014 SV_{194}	—	October 26, 2009	Kitt Peak	Spacewatch	VER	2.7 km	MPC · JPL
672226	2014 SA_{196}	—	January 8, 2011	Mount Lemmon	Mount Lemmon Survey	·	2.1 km	MPC · JPL
672227	2014 SE_{202}	—	May 14, 2010	Mount Lemmon	Mount Lemmon Survey	·	690 m	MPC · JPL
672228	2014 ST_{206}	—	September 25, 2008	Mount Lemmon	Mount Lemmon Survey	·	2.7 km	MPC · JPL
672229	2014 SW_{206}	—	August 31, 2014	Haleakala	Pan-STARRS 1	·	790 m	MPC · JPL
672230	2014 SP_{207}	—	January 17, 2007	Kitt Peak	Spacewatch	(5)	1.0 km	MPC · JPL
672231	2014 SG_{208}	—	August 31, 2014	Haleakala	Pan-STARRS 1	·	960 m	MPC · JPL
672232	2014 SC_{212}	—	July 11, 2008	Siding Spring	SSS	·	2.7 km	MPC · JPL
672233	2014 SR_{212}	—	August 15, 2009	Kitt Peak	Spacewatch	·	1.7 km	MPC · JPL
672234	2014 SK_{214}	—	October 24, 2001	Palomar	NEAT	·	1 km	MPC · JPL
672235	2014 SJ_{216}	—	January 11, 2010	Kitt Peak	Spacewatch	·	2.4 km	MPC · JPL
672236	2014 SN_{217}	—	July 7, 2011	Cerro Burek	Burek, Cerro	H	400 m	MPC · JPL
672237	2014 SW_{219}	—	September 20, 2014	Haleakala	Pan-STARRS 1	·	1.1 km	MPC · JPL
672238	2014 SH_{220}	—	September 20, 2014	Haleakala	Pan-STARRS 1	·	1.1 km	MPC · JPL
672239	2014 SF_{223}	—	September 22, 2014	Haleakala	Pan-STARRS 1	·	1.2 km	MPC · JPL
672240	2014 SS_{224}	—	September 18, 2014	Haleakala	Pan-STARRS 1	·	1.0 km	MPC · JPL
672241	2014 SL_{229}	—	May 14, 2012	Mount Lemmon	Mount Lemmon Survey	·	2.7 km	MPC · JPL
672242	2014 SW_{230}	—	November 5, 2010	Kitt Peak	Spacewatch	(5)	1.0 km	MPC · JPL
672243	2014 SY_{231}	—	November 13, 2010	Mount Lemmon	Mount Lemmon Survey	·	1.0 km	MPC · JPL
672244	2014 SE_{232}	—	October 10, 2007	Mount Lemmon	Mount Lemmon Survey	·	890 m	MPC · JPL
672245	2014 SR_{238}	—	June 3, 2014	Haleakala	Pan-STARRS 1	·	750 m	MPC · JPL
672246	2014 SY_{238}	—	June 22, 2014	Mount Lemmon	Mount Lemmon Survey	·	1.1 km	MPC · JPL
672247	2014 SW_{242}	—	August 22, 2014	Haleakala	Pan-STARRS 1	TIR	2.2 km	MPC · JPL
672248	2014 SG_{244}	—	July 31, 2014	Haleakala	Pan-STARRS 1	·	780 m	MPC · JPL
672249	2014 SU_{247}	—	April 24, 2007	Mount Lemmon	Mount Lemmon Survey	·	2.5 km	MPC · JPL
672250	2014 SL_{248}	—	May 5, 2008	Mount Lemmon	Mount Lemmon Survey	·	1.7 km	MPC · JPL
672251	2014 SN_{249}	—	August 6, 2014	Haleakala	Pan-STARRS 1	·	850 m	MPC · JPL
672252	2014 SN_{251}	—	March 14, 2007	Kitt Peak	Spacewatch	·	3.3 km	MPC · JPL
672253	2014 SP_{251}	—	September 14, 2014	Kitt Peak	Spacewatch	TIR	2.4 km	MPC · JPL
672254	2014 SH_{252}	—	February 1, 2006	Mount Lemmon	Mount Lemmon Survey	·	770 m	MPC · JPL
672255	2014 ST_{252}	—	January 7, 2006	Mount Lemmon	Mount Lemmon Survey	EOS	1.9 km	MPC · JPL
672256	2014 SZ_{253}	—	September 19, 2003	Kitt Peak	Spacewatch	EOS	2.0 km	MPC · JPL
672257	2014 SC_{255}	—	September 2, 2014	Haleakala	Pan-STARRS 1	·	630 m	MPC · JPL
672258	2014 SY_{255}	—	September 19, 2003	Kitt Peak	Spacewatch	·	2.3 km	MPC · JPL
672259	2014 SH_{259}	—	May 21, 2006	Kitt Peak	Spacewatch	·	1.1 km	MPC · JPL
672260	2014 SX_{260}	—	September 25, 2014	Catalina	CSS	·	1.4 km	MPC · JPL
672261	2014 SP_{263}	—	September 14, 2007	Mount Lemmon	Mount Lemmon Survey	·	860 m	MPC · JPL
672262	2014 SG_{264}	—	September 14, 2007	Mount Lemmon	Mount Lemmon Survey	·	780 m	MPC · JPL
672263	2014 SS_{266}	—	June 3, 2014	Haleakala	Pan-STARRS 1	·	2.7 km	MPC · JPL
672264	2014 SK_{276}	—	January 2, 2012	Mount Lemmon	Mount Lemmon Survey	·	1.3 km	MPC · JPL
672265	2014 SM_{277}	—	July 29, 2008	Mount Lemmon	Mount Lemmon Survey	·	2.7 km	MPC · JPL
672266	2014 SJ_{279}	—	September 18, 2007	Mount Lemmon	Mount Lemmon Survey	·	690 m	MPC · JPL
672267	2014 SN_{280}	—	September 22, 2003	Palomar	NEAT	NYS	920 m	MPC · JPL
672268	2014 SO_{280}	—	August 25, 2014	Haleakala	Pan-STARRS 1	·	540 m	MPC · JPL
672269	2014 SB_{281}	—	October 17, 2007	Mount Lemmon	Mount Lemmon Survey	·	860 m	MPC · JPL
672270	2014 SE_{281}	—	September 2, 2014	Haleakala	Pan-STARRS 1	·	980 m	MPC · JPL
672271	2014 ST_{282}	—	September 2, 2014	Haleakala	Pan-STARRS 1	(5)	940 m	MPC · JPL
672272	2014 SX_{283}	—	September 23, 2014	Mount Lemmon	Mount Lemmon Survey	·	3.2 km	MPC · JPL
672273	2014 SL_{284}	—	March 5, 2013	Haleakala	Pan-STARRS 1	·	2.1 km	MPC · JPL
672274	2014 SX_{284}	—	September 18, 2010	Mount Lemmon	Mount Lemmon Survey	·	1.2 km	MPC · JPL
672275	2014 SN_{288}	—	September 24, 2014	ESA OGS	ESA OGS	·	1.1 km	MPC · JPL
672276	2014 SY_{288}	—	August 28, 2014	Haleakala	Pan-STARRS 1	EOS	1.8 km	MPC · JPL
672277	2014 SG_{290}	—	August 18, 2014	Haleakala	Pan-STARRS 1	(2076)	720 m	MPC · JPL
672278	2014 SF_{296}	—	August 28, 2014	Haleakala	Pan-STARRS 1	·	3.0 km	MPC · JPL
672279	2014 SY_{297}	—	January 17, 2007	Kitt Peak	Spacewatch	·	1.0 km	MPC · JPL
672280	2014 SH_{298}	—	September 29, 2008	Mount Lemmon	Mount Lemmon Survey	·	3.3 km	MPC · JPL
672281	2014 SB_{301}	—	October 13, 2010	Mount Lemmon	Mount Lemmon Survey	(5)	1 km	MPC · JPL
672282	2014 SL_{301}	—	September 16, 2014	Haleakala	Pan-STARRS 1	·	1.5 km	MPC · JPL
672283	2014 SW_{301}	—	September 23, 2008	Kitt Peak	Spacewatch	·	3.3 km	MPC · JPL
672284	2014 SK_{302}	—	June 30, 2014	Haleakala	Pan-STARRS 1	·	3.3 km	MPC · JPL
672285	2014 SY_{302}	—	August 18, 2014	Haleakala	Pan-STARRS 1	·	1.7 km	MPC · JPL
672286	2014 SX_{303}	—	April 4, 2008	Catalina	CSS	H	350 m	MPC · JPL
672287	2014 SO_{305}	—	September 19, 2014	Haleakala	Pan-STARRS 1	HYG	2.2 km	MPC · JPL
672288	2014 SZ_{305}	—	September 23, 2014	Kitt Peak	Spacewatch	·	1.0 km	MPC · JPL
672289	2014 SC_{307}	—	September 24, 2014	Mount Lemmon	Mount Lemmon Survey	·	1.0 km	MPC · JPL
672290	2014 SA_{309}	—	September 24, 2014	Mount Lemmon	Mount Lemmon Survey	·	970 m	MPC · JPL
672291	2014 SO_{309}	—	October 8, 2010	Mayhill-ISON	L. Elenin	·	1.2 km	MPC · JPL
672292	2014 SR_{309}	—	August 31, 2014	Haleakala	Pan-STARRS 1	·	830 m	MPC · JPL
672293	2014 SJ_{311}	—	November 11, 2004	Kitt Peak	Spacewatch	EOS	2.3 km	MPC · JPL
672294	2014 SZ_{311}	—	August 13, 2010	Kitt Peak	Spacewatch	·	1.0 km	MPC · JPL
672295	2014 SJ_{312}	—	September 3, 2007	Catalina	CSS	·	620 m	MPC · JPL
672296	2014 SA_{313}	—	October 20, 2003	Kitt Peak	Spacewatch	·	2.7 km	MPC · JPL
672297	2014 SF_{313}	—	September 15, 2014	Mount Lemmon	Mount Lemmon Survey	·	570 m	MPC · JPL
672298	2014 SN_{313}	—	July 7, 2003	Kitt Peak	Spacewatch	·	2.1 km	MPC · JPL
672299	2014 SB_{314}	—	September 26, 2014	Kitt Peak	Spacewatch	·	1.3 km	MPC · JPL
672300	2014 SE_{318}	—	October 10, 2007	Kitt Peak	Spacewatch	·	900 m	MPC · JPL

== 672301–672400 ==
back to top

Designation			Discovery			Properties		Ref
Permanent	Provisional	Named after	Date	Site	Discoverer(s)	Category	Diam.	Ref
672301	2014 SB_{321}	—	August 25, 2014	Haleakala	Pan-STARRS 1	·	870 m	MPC · JPL
672302	2014 SH_{323}	—	September 30, 2014	Mount Lemmon	Mount Lemmon Survey	·	2.3 km	MPC · JPL
672303	2014 SU_{325}	—	September 26, 2014	Catalina	CSS	TIR	2.8 km	MPC · JPL
672304	2014 SC_{326}	—	August 30, 2014	Haleakala	Pan-STARRS 1	EUN	800 m	MPC · JPL
672305	2014 SM_{327}	—	September 12, 2007	Mount Lemmon	Mount Lemmon Survey	·	540 m	MPC · JPL
672306	2014 SW_{327}	—	January 27, 2012	Mount Lemmon	Mount Lemmon Survey	·	1.2 km	MPC · JPL
672307	2014 SO_{328}	—	October 29, 2003	Socorro	LINEAR	·	2.7 km	MPC · JPL
672308	2014 SA_{330}	—	September 29, 2014	Kitt Peak	Spacewatch	·	770 m	MPC · JPL
672309	2014 SC_{330}	—	December 2, 2010	Kitt Peak	Spacewatch	·	1.1 km	MPC · JPL
672310	2014 SV_{338}	—	September 16, 2003	Palomar	NEAT	·	910 m	MPC · JPL
672311	2014 SG_{339}	—	November 24, 2003	Kitt Peak	Spacewatch	HYG	2.7 km	MPC · JPL
672312	2014 SO_{340}	—	September 20, 2008	Mount Lemmon	Mount Lemmon Survey	·	3.3 km	MPC · JPL
672313	2014 SO_{341}	—	April 14, 2007	Kitt Peak	Spacewatch	·	2.4 km	MPC · JPL
672314	2014 SG_{344}	—	November 18, 2003	Kitt Peak	Spacewatch	·	1.1 km	MPC · JPL
672315	2014 SU_{345}	—	February 2, 2006	Kitt Peak	Spacewatch	·	680 m	MPC · JPL
672316	2014 SW_{345}	—	August 4, 2002	Palomar	NEAT	·	3.8 km	MPC · JPL
672317	2014 SY_{345}	—	April 15, 2012	Haleakala	Pan-STARRS 1	·	3.2 km	MPC · JPL
672318	2014 ST_{350}	—	September 16, 2014	Haleakala	Pan-STARRS 1	H	360 m	MPC · JPL
672319	2014 SU_{352}	—	September 22, 2014	Haleakala	Pan-STARRS 1	·	1.1 km	MPC · JPL
672320	2014 SK_{354}	—	November 2, 2008	Mount Lemmon	Mount Lemmon Survey	·	3.2 km	MPC · JPL
672321	2014 SF_{355}	—	September 19, 2014	Haleakala	Pan-STARRS 1	·	1.5 km	MPC · JPL
672322	2014 SJ_{355}	—	March 15, 2007	Mount Lemmon	Mount Lemmon Survey	·	2.1 km	MPC · JPL
672323	2014 SQ_{356}	—	September 18, 2003	Kitt Peak	Spacewatch	·	2.3 km	MPC · JPL
672324	2014 SQ_{360}	—	September 20, 2014	Haleakala	Pan-STARRS 1	·	3.0 km	MPC · JPL
672325	2014 SL_{365}	—	September 19, 2014	Haleakala	Pan-STARRS 1	·	1.0 km	MPC · JPL
672326	2014 SY_{365}	—	September 22, 2014	Haleakala	Pan-STARRS 1	·	1.1 km	MPC · JPL
672327	2014 SE_{366}	—	September 23, 2014	Haleakala	Pan-STARRS 1	·	2.3 km	MPC · JPL
672328	2014 SJ_{379}	—	September 27, 2014	Mount Lemmon	Mount Lemmon Survey	·	820 m	MPC · JPL
672329	2014 SP_{385}	—	September 18, 2014	Haleakala	Pan-STARRS 1	·	640 m	MPC · JPL
672330	2014 TK_{2}	—	May 13, 2013	Kitt Peak	Spacewatch	·	3.1 km	MPC · JPL
672331	2014 TT_{2}	—	September 13, 2014	Haleakala	Pan-STARRS 1	·	3.2 km	MPC · JPL
672332	2014 TE_{4}	—	November 13, 2010	Kitt Peak	Spacewatch	·	1.1 km	MPC · JPL
672333	2014 TA_{7}	—	October 1, 2014	Kitt Peak	Spacewatch	·	2.4 km	MPC · JPL
672334	2014 TO_{8}	—	December 14, 2004	Nashville	Clingan, R.	·	750 m	MPC · JPL
672335	2014 TH_{12}	—	October 14, 2007	Mount Lemmon	Mount Lemmon Survey	·	950 m	MPC · JPL
672336	2014 TD_{15}	—	January 19, 2005	Kitt Peak	Spacewatch	·	2.9 km	MPC · JPL
672337	2014 TA_{16}	—	September 6, 2014	Mount Lemmon	Mount Lemmon Survey	·	830 m	MPC · JPL
672338	2014 TT_{17}	—	September 2, 2014	Catalina	CSS	·	1.2 km	MPC · JPL
672339	2014 TY_{17}	—	February 12, 2013	Haleakala	Pan-STARRS 1	H	480 m	MPC · JPL
672340	2014 TN_{21}	—	December 3, 2010	Mount Lemmon	Mount Lemmon Survey	·	880 m	MPC · JPL
672341	2014 TY_{23}	—	March 1, 2009	Kitt Peak	Spacewatch	(2076)	730 m	MPC · JPL
672342	2014 TC_{27}	—	September 22, 2014	Kitt Peak	Spacewatch	·	3.0 km	MPC · JPL
672343	2014 TE_{27}	—	September 23, 2014	Mount Lemmon	Mount Lemmon Survey	·	990 m	MPC · JPL
672344	2014 TR_{28}	—	September 10, 2007	Mount Lemmon	Mount Lemmon Survey	·	770 m	MPC · JPL
672345	2014 TD_{29}	—	October 13, 2007	Kitt Peak	Spacewatch	·	640 m	MPC · JPL
672346	2014 TQ_{34}	—	February 5, 2013	Haleakala	Pan-STARRS 1	H	600 m	MPC · JPL
672347	2014 TZ_{34}	—	October 5, 2014	Mount Lemmon	Mount Lemmon Survey	·	1.5 km	MPC · JPL
672348	2014 TJ_{35}	—	September 16, 2003	Kitt Peak	Spacewatch	·	1.0 km	MPC · JPL
672349	2014 TM_{36}	—	May 21, 2012	Mount Lemmon	Mount Lemmon Survey	VER	2.6 km	MPC · JPL
672350	2014 TO_{36}	—	October 24, 2007	Mount Lemmon	Mount Lemmon Survey	·	760 m	MPC · JPL
672351	2014 TA_{37}	—	August 29, 2014	Haleakala	Pan-STARRS 1	·	1.5 km	MPC · JPL
672352	2014 TD_{41}	—	September 29, 2014	Haleakala	Pan-STARRS 1	·	1.0 km	MPC · JPL
672353	2014 TW_{42}	—	December 1, 2010	Mount Lemmon	Mount Lemmon Survey	·	890 m	MPC · JPL
672354	2014 TR_{44}	—	December 5, 2007	Kitt Peak	Spacewatch	·	980 m	MPC · JPL
672355	2014 TN_{45}	—	October 18, 2003	Kitt Peak	Spacewatch	·	900 m	MPC · JPL
672356	2014 TQ_{46}	—	October 2, 2014	Kitt Peak	Spacewatch	·	840 m	MPC · JPL
672357	2014 TH_{48}	—	October 31, 2010	Piszkés-tető	K. Sárneczky, Z. Kuli	·	990 m	MPC · JPL
672358	2014 TU_{48}	—	October 9, 2007	Kitt Peak	Spacewatch	V	450 m	MPC · JPL
672359	2014 TL_{49}	—	March 24, 2006	Kitt Peak	Spacewatch	·	3.8 km	MPC · JPL
672360	2014 TF_{51}	—	October 12, 2010	Mount Lemmon	Mount Lemmon Survey	·	880 m	MPC · JPL
672361	2014 TU_{51}	—	October 23, 2009	Kitt Peak	Spacewatch	·	2.8 km	MPC · JPL
672362	2014 TT_{54}	—	October 22, 2003	Apache Point	SDSS Collaboration	·	2.5 km	MPC · JPL
672363	2014 TC_{59}	—	October 9, 2008	Kitt Peak	Spacewatch	·	3.0 km	MPC · JPL
672364	2014 TP_{60}	—	June 3, 2006	Mount Lemmon	Mount Lemmon Survey	NYS	840 m	MPC · JPL
672365	2014 TJ_{63}	—	October 15, 2014	Catalina	CSS	·	1.4 km	MPC · JPL
672366	2014 TK_{66}	—	September 24, 2014	Kitt Peak	Spacewatch	·	740 m	MPC · JPL
672367	2014 TQ_{69}	—	October 14, 2014	Kitt Peak	Spacewatch	·	810 m	MPC · JPL
672368	2014 TV_{70}	—	October 14, 2014	Kitt Peak	Spacewatch	·	1.0 km	MPC · JPL
672369	2014 TW_{72}	—	August 31, 2014	Haleakala	Pan-STARRS 1	·	920 m	MPC · JPL
672370	2014 TA_{73}	—	December 26, 2006	Kitt Peak	Spacewatch	·	940 m	MPC · JPL
672371	2014 TL_{73}	—	November 14, 2010	Mount Lemmon	Mount Lemmon Survey	(5)	830 m	MPC · JPL
672372	2014 TT_{73}	—	November 12, 2007	Mount Lemmon	Mount Lemmon Survey	·	470 m	MPC · JPL
672373	2014 TM_{78}	—	October 9, 2010	Mount Lemmon	Mount Lemmon Survey	(5)	810 m	MPC · JPL
672374	2014 TV_{79}	—	June 30, 2014	Haleakala	Pan-STARRS 1	·	3.0 km	MPC · JPL
672375	2014 TP_{82}	—	February 10, 2012	Mount Lemmon	Mount Lemmon Survey	·	980 m	MPC · JPL
672376	2014 TA_{87}	—	October 2, 2014	Haleakala	Pan-STARRS 1	·	1.1 km	MPC · JPL
672377	2014 TA_{90}	—	February 3, 2000	Kitt Peak	Spacewatch	·	2.5 km	MPC · JPL
672378	2014 TG_{90}	—	October 4, 2014	Haleakala	Pan-STARRS 1	MAR	1.0 km	MPC · JPL
672379	2014 TZ_{93}	—	October 3, 2014	Haleakala	Pan-STARRS 1	·	890 m	MPC · JPL
672380	2014 TJ_{94}	—	January 3, 2011	Mount Lemmon	Mount Lemmon Survey	HNS	970 m	MPC · JPL
672381	2014 TM_{94}	—	October 5, 2014	Mount Lemmon	Mount Lemmon Survey	·	1.1 km	MPC · JPL
672382	2014 TV_{94}	—	March 15, 2012	Mount Lemmon	Mount Lemmon Survey	·	1.2 km	MPC · JPL
672383	2014 TX_{94}	—	October 12, 2014	Mount Lemmon	Mount Lemmon Survey	EUN	800 m	MPC · JPL
672384	2014 TQ_{98}	—	October 3, 2014	Kitt Peak	Spacewatch	·	950 m	MPC · JPL
672385	2014 TR_{98}	—	October 12, 2014	Mount Lemmon	Mount Lemmon Survey	·	1.1 km	MPC · JPL
672386	2014 TJ_{101}	—	October 1, 2014	Haleakala	Pan-STARRS 1	·	2.3 km	MPC · JPL
672387	2014 TY_{104}	—	October 2, 2014	Haleakala	Pan-STARRS 1	·	950 m	MPC · JPL
672388	2014 TP_{105}	—	October 3, 2014	Kitt Peak	Spacewatch	SYL	3.4 km	MPC · JPL
672389	2014 TU_{111}	—	October 5, 2014	Haleakala	Pan-STARRS 1	·	830 m	MPC · JPL
672390	2014 TL_{114}	—	October 3, 2014	Mount Lemmon	Mount Lemmon Survey	T_{j} (2.96) · 3:2	4.9 km	MPC · JPL
672391	2014 TR_{116}	—	October 5, 2014	Haleakala	Pan-STARRS 1	MAR	840 m	MPC · JPL
672392	2014 TN_{117}	—	October 2, 2014	Haleakala	Pan-STARRS 1	·	1.7 km	MPC · JPL
672393	2014 UB_{2}	—	September 4, 2014	Haleakala	Pan-STARRS 1	(5)	950 m	MPC · JPL
672394	2014 UY_{2}	—	November 2, 2006	Mount Lemmon	Mount Lemmon Survey	·	850 m	MPC · JPL
672395	2014 UQ_{3}	—	November 16, 2003	Kitt Peak	Spacewatch	VER	2.9 km	MPC · JPL
672396	2014 UX_{3}	—	August 10, 2010	Kitt Peak	Spacewatch	·	1.1 km	MPC · JPL
672397	2014 UZ_{3}	—	November 20, 2009	Mount Lemmon	Mount Lemmon Survey	EOS	1.8 km	MPC · JPL
672398	2014 UO_{4}	—	October 3, 2014	Mount Lemmon	Mount Lemmon Survey	ADE	1.4 km	MPC · JPL
672399	2014 UB_{7}	—	September 19, 2003	Kitt Peak	Spacewatch	·	720 m	MPC · JPL
672400	2014 UB_{10}	—	October 16, 2014	Mount Lemmon	Mount Lemmon Survey	(5)	970 m	MPC · JPL

== 672401–672500 ==
back to top

Designation			Discovery			Properties		Ref
Permanent	Provisional	Named after	Date	Site	Discoverer(s)	Category	Diam.	Ref
672401	2014 UQ_{10}	—	November 11, 2006	Kitt Peak	Spacewatch	·	970 m	MPC · JPL
672402	2014 UA_{18}	—	September 23, 2011	Haleakala	Pan-STARRS 1	·	560 m	MPC · JPL
672403	2014 UE_{21}	—	October 18, 2014	Mount Lemmon	Mount Lemmon Survey	MAR	630 m	MPC · JPL
672404	2014 UF_{21}	—	October 18, 2014	Mount Lemmon	Mount Lemmon Survey	·	540 m	MPC · JPL
672405	2014 UL_{21}	—	October 18, 2014	Mount Lemmon	Mount Lemmon Survey	(5)	900 m	MPC · JPL
672406	2014 UC_{23}	—	August 31, 2014	Haleakala	Pan-STARRS 1	·	940 m	MPC · JPL
672407	2014 UB_{24}	—	December 4, 2007	Kitt Peak	Spacewatch	·	870 m	MPC · JPL
672408	2014 US_{24}	—	November 30, 2010	Mount Lemmon	Mount Lemmon Survey	·	1.3 km	MPC · JPL
672409	2014 UJ_{25}	—	September 4, 2014	Haleakala	Pan-STARRS 1	·	980 m	MPC · JPL
672410	2014 UN_{26}	—	October 24, 2003	Kitt Peak	Spacewatch	·	2.4 km	MPC · JPL
672411	2014 UM_{30}	—	October 21, 2014	Kitt Peak	Spacewatch	·	1.0 km	MPC · JPL
672412	2014 UR_{31}	—	October 21, 2014	Mount Lemmon	Mount Lemmon Survey	(5)	970 m	MPC · JPL
672413	2014 UK_{33}	—	March 14, 2010	Mount Lemmon	Mount Lemmon Survey	H	560 m	MPC · JPL
672414	2014 UN_{33}	—	January 8, 2002	Socorro	LINEAR	H	530 m	MPC · JPL
672415	2014 UA_{37}	—	March 8, 2008	Mount Lemmon	Mount Lemmon Survey	(5)	780 m	MPC · JPL
672416	2014 UG_{40}	—	October 18, 2014	Mount Lemmon	Mount Lemmon Survey	·	1.2 km	MPC · JPL
672417	2014 UE_{46}	—	September 23, 2014	Haleakala	Pan-STARRS 1	·	1.1 km	MPC · JPL
672418	2014 UG_{46}	—	November 5, 2010	Mount Lemmon	Mount Lemmon Survey	·	1.1 km	MPC · JPL
672419	2014 UV_{50}	—	December 15, 2009	Mount Lemmon	Mount Lemmon Survey	·	2.4 km	MPC · JPL
672420	2014 UY_{50}	—	October 21, 2014	Kitt Peak	Spacewatch	·	1.1 km	MPC · JPL
672421	2014 UB_{52}	—	September 5, 2008	Kitt Peak	Spacewatch	·	3.1 km	MPC · JPL
672422	2014 UC_{52}	—	August 25, 2014	Haleakala	Pan-STARRS 1	JUN	880 m	MPC · JPL
672423	2014 UO_{52}	—	October 31, 2010	Mount Lemmon	Mount Lemmon Survey	(1547)	1.3 km	MPC · JPL
672424	2014 UN_{55}	—	April 26, 2006	Cerro Tololo	Deep Ecliptic Survey	·	2.5 km	MPC · JPL
672425	2014 UY_{55}	—	March 9, 2005	Mount Lemmon	Mount Lemmon Survey	H	560 m	MPC · JPL
672426	2014 UL_{57}	—	October 17, 2007	Mount Lemmon	Mount Lemmon Survey	·	810 m	MPC · JPL
672427	2014 UT_{57}	—	April 21, 2009	Mount Lemmon	Mount Lemmon Survey	·	2.1 km	MPC · JPL
672428	2014 UV_{60}	—	October 18, 2014	Mount Lemmon	Mount Lemmon Survey	·	770 m	MPC · JPL
672429	2014 UE_{62}	—	September 23, 2014	Haleakala	Pan-STARRS 1	·	830 m	MPC · JPL
672430	2014 UH_{62}	—	November 20, 2001	Socorro	LINEAR	·	3.9 km	MPC · JPL
672431	2014 US_{63}	—	April 28, 2006	Cerro Tololo	Deep Ecliptic Survey	·	660 m	MPC · JPL
672432	2014 UB_{64}	—	September 19, 2014	Haleakala	Pan-STARRS 1	·	1.1 km	MPC · JPL
672433	2014 UW_{65}	—	September 29, 2008	Mount Lemmon	Mount Lemmon Survey	·	3.5 km	MPC · JPL
672434	2014 UQ_{67}	—	November 15, 2010	Mount Lemmon	Mount Lemmon Survey	·	1.2 km	MPC · JPL
672435	2014 UX_{68}	—	February 19, 2009	Kitt Peak	Spacewatch	MAS	690 m	MPC · JPL
672436	2014 UX_{69}	—	September 23, 2014	Mount Lemmon	Mount Lemmon Survey	·	1.0 km	MPC · JPL
672437	2014 UZ_{72}	—	August 12, 2010	Kitt Peak	Spacewatch	·	940 m	MPC · JPL
672438	2014 US_{78}	—	October 21, 2014	Mount Lemmon	Mount Lemmon Survey	·	630 m	MPC · JPL
672439	2014 UX_{79}	—	September 21, 1998	Kitt Peak	Spacewatch	·	2.5 km	MPC · JPL
672440	2014 UR_{82}	—	September 28, 2003	Kitt Peak	Spacewatch	·	780 m	MPC · JPL
672441	2014 UE_{83}	—	November 23, 2003	Kitt Peak	Spacewatch	·	3.0 km	MPC · JPL
672442	2014 UA_{90}	—	August 31, 2014	Haleakala	Pan-STARRS 1	NYS	1.1 km	MPC · JPL
672443	2014 UJ_{90}	—	October 14, 2014	Kitt Peak	Spacewatch	·	690 m	MPC · JPL
672444	2014 UM_{91}	—	September 2, 2014	Haleakala	Pan-STARRS 1	·	870 m	MPC · JPL
672445	2014 US_{93}	—	December 10, 2010	Bisei	BATTeRS	·	1.2 km	MPC · JPL
672446	2014 UY_{101}	—	December 1, 2003	Kitt Peak	Spacewatch	·	3.2 km	MPC · JPL
672447	2014 UM_{102}	—	September 19, 2014	Haleakala	Pan-STARRS 1	·	850 m	MPC · JPL
672448	2014 UR_{103}	—	October 24, 2014	Kitt Peak	Spacewatch	BRG	1.1 km	MPC · JPL
672449	2014 UC_{104}	—	December 1, 2005	Mount Lemmon	Mount Lemmon Survey	·	2.2 km	MPC · JPL
672450	2014 UN_{104}	—	September 19, 2014	Haleakala	Pan-STARRS 1	EUN	740 m	MPC · JPL
672451	2014 UC_{106}	—	October 16, 2001	Palomar	NEAT	·	670 m	MPC · JPL
672452	2014 UQ_{106}	—	October 16, 2014	Kitt Peak	Spacewatch	·	1.0 km	MPC · JPL
672453	2014 UJ_{107}	—	November 8, 2010	Mount Lemmon	Mount Lemmon Survey	·	890 m	MPC · JPL
672454	2014 UW_{108}	—	October 3, 2014	Mount Lemmon	Mount Lemmon Survey	·	1.1 km	MPC · JPL
672455	2014 UA_{113}	—	September 30, 2014	Mount Lemmon	Mount Lemmon Survey	H	470 m	MPC · JPL
672456	2014 UZ_{113}	—	October 27, 2008	Mount Lemmon	Mount Lemmon Survey	·	3.3 km	MPC · JPL
672457	2014 UR_{116}	—	October 27, 2014	MASTER-II	MASTER-II	APO · PHA	390 m	MPC · JPL
672458	2014 UJ_{117}	—	October 14, 2009	Mount Lemmon	Mount Lemmon Survey	H	430 m	MPC · JPL
672459	2014 UP_{118}	—	November 5, 2010	Mount Lemmon	Mount Lemmon Survey	·	1.2 km	MPC · JPL
672460	2014 UG_{123}	—	October 22, 2014	Mount Lemmon	Mount Lemmon Survey	(194)	1.1 km	MPC · JPL
672461	2014 UN_{125}	—	October 5, 2003	Kitt Peak	Spacewatch	·	3.3 km	MPC · JPL
672462	2014 US_{125}	—	November 3, 2007	Mount Lemmon	Mount Lemmon Survey	·	950 m	MPC · JPL
672463	2014 UG_{126}	—	October 22, 2014	Catalina	CSS	·	1.1 km	MPC · JPL
672464	2014 UN_{127}	—	January 30, 2012	Haleakala	Pan-STARRS 1	·	3.2 km	MPC · JPL
672465	2014 UZ_{127}	—	June 15, 2010	Mount Lemmon	Mount Lemmon Survey	·	1.2 km	MPC · JPL
672466	2014 UV_{128}	—	September 24, 2014	Mount Lemmon	Mount Lemmon Survey	·	3.7 km	MPC · JPL
672467	2014 UJ_{132}	—	October 20, 2003	Kitt Peak	Spacewatch	·	2.0 km	MPC · JPL
672468	2014 US_{133}	—	November 26, 2003	Kitt Peak	Spacewatch	·	1.1 km	MPC · JPL
672469	2014 UZ_{135}	—	October 16, 2014	Kitt Peak	Spacewatch	·	480 m	MPC · JPL
672470	2014 UW_{137}	—	September 25, 2014	Mount Lemmon	Mount Lemmon Survey	·	1.0 km	MPC · JPL
672471	2014 UE_{138}	—	September 25, 2014	Kitt Peak	Spacewatch	·	1.2 km	MPC · JPL
672472	2014 UL_{141}	—	March 13, 2013	Haleakala	Pan-STARRS 1	·	1.1 km	MPC · JPL
672473	2014 UU_{148}	—	October 25, 2014	Kitt Peak	Spacewatch	·	1.3 km	MPC · JPL
672474	2014 UB_{149}	—	May 31, 2006	Mount Lemmon	Mount Lemmon Survey	EOS	2.1 km	MPC · JPL
672475	2014 UV_{149}	—	October 20, 2007	Mount Lemmon	Mount Lemmon Survey	·	870 m	MPC · JPL
672476	2014 UF_{153}	—	November 10, 2010	Mount Lemmon	Mount Lemmon Survey	RAF	640 m	MPC · JPL
672477	2014 UN_{155}	—	August 19, 2014	Haleakala	Pan-STARRS 1	·	1.1 km	MPC · JPL
672478	2014 UV_{156}	—	October 25, 2014	Kitt Peak	Spacewatch	HNS	1.4 km	MPC · JPL
672479	2014 UP_{159}	—	August 31, 2014	Haleakala	Pan-STARRS 1	V	570 m	MPC · JPL
672480	2014 UP_{164}	—	March 7, 2013	Mount Lemmon	Mount Lemmon Survey	·	1 km	MPC · JPL
672481	2014 UT_{169}	—	December 10, 2009	Mount Lemmon	Mount Lemmon Survey	·	2.4 km	MPC · JPL
672482	2014 UY_{169}	—	October 30, 2009	Mount Lemmon	Mount Lemmon Survey	(1118)	3.4 km	MPC · JPL
672483	2014 UN_{170}	—	September 13, 2014	Haleakala	Pan-STARRS 1	·	520 m	MPC · JPL
672484	2014 UV_{171}	—	October 28, 2014	Mount Lemmon	Mount Lemmon Survey	·	980 m	MPC · JPL
672485	2014 UN_{174}	—	November 4, 2007	Mount Lemmon	Mount Lemmon Survey	V	660 m	MPC · JPL
672486	2014 UA_{179}	—	September 22, 2003	Palomar	NEAT	·	3.2 km	MPC · JPL
672487	2014 UM_{179}	—	September 7, 2014	Haleakala	Pan-STARRS 1	·	3.8 km	MPC · JPL
672488	2014 UJ_{182}	—	October 14, 2014	Kitt Peak	Spacewatch	·	860 m	MPC · JPL
672489	2014 US_{182}	—	November 7, 2010	Mount Lemmon	Mount Lemmon Survey	·	850 m	MPC · JPL
672490	2014 UO_{183}	—	December 25, 2011	Mount Lemmon	Mount Lemmon Survey	NYS	1.0 km	MPC · JPL
672491	2014 UD_{185}	—	September 25, 2014	Kitt Peak	Spacewatch	·	1.1 km	MPC · JPL
672492	2014 UT_{191}	—	October 30, 2014	Haleakala	Pan-STARRS 1	H	370 m	MPC · JPL
672493	2014 UX_{192}	—	November 3, 2010	Mayhill-ISON	L. Elenin	·	1.4 km	MPC · JPL
672494	2014 UE_{193}	—	November 18, 2009	Kitt Peak	Spacewatch	EOS	1.4 km	MPC · JPL
672495	2014 UF_{198}	—	November 10, 1999	Kitt Peak	Spacewatch	·	1.1 km	MPC · JPL
672496	2014 UN_{203}	—	September 28, 2003	Kitt Peak	Spacewatch	·	3.4 km	MPC · JPL
672497	2014 UF_{204}	—	May 1, 2006	Kitt Peak	Spacewatch	·	3.2 km	MPC · JPL
672498	2014 UR_{204}	—	September 18, 2014	Haleakala	Pan-STARRS 1	PHO	710 m	MPC · JPL
672499	2014 UM_{205}	—	August 22, 2003	Palomar	NEAT	NYS	880 m	MPC · JPL
672500	2014 UX_{206}	—	December 5, 2007	Kitt Peak	Spacewatch	·	780 m	MPC · JPL

== 672501–672600 ==
back to top

Designation			Discovery			Properties		Ref
Permanent	Provisional	Named after	Date	Site	Discoverer(s)	Category	Diam.	Ref
672501	2014 UC_{207}	—	April 30, 2006	Kitt Peak	Spacewatch	·	3.3 km	MPC · JPL
672502	2014 UZ_{207}	—	March 25, 2007	Mount Lemmon	Mount Lemmon Survey	T_{j} (2.98) · EUP	3.0 km	MPC · JPL
672503	2014 UK_{213}	—	November 18, 2009	Mount Lemmon	Mount Lemmon Survey	·	2.9 km	MPC · JPL
672504	2014 UA_{216}	—	August 31, 2014	Haleakala	Pan-STARRS 1	·	1.0 km	MPC · JPL
672505	2014 UF_{217}	—	September 30, 2009	Mount Lemmon	Mount Lemmon Survey	EOS	2.2 km	MPC · JPL
672506	2014 UY_{218}	—	November 15, 2010	Mount Lemmon	Mount Lemmon Survey	·	1.2 km	MPC · JPL
672507	2014 UU_{222}	—	January 30, 2012	Mount Lemmon	Mount Lemmon Survey	EOS	2.2 km	MPC · JPL
672508	2014 UA_{225}	—	June 23, 2015	Mauna Kea	OSSOS	SDO	149 km	MPC · JPL
672509	2014 UC_{226}	—	October 29, 2014	Haleakala	Pan-STARRS 1	H	410 m	MPC · JPL
672510	2014 UV_{233}	—	October 17, 2014	Mount Lemmon	Mount Lemmon Survey	·	970 m	MPC · JPL
672511	2014 UF_{234}	—	October 21, 2014	Kitt Peak	Spacewatch	·	2.5 km	MPC · JPL
672512	2014 UG_{234}	—	October 21, 2014	Kitt Peak	Spacewatch	·	850 m	MPC · JPL
672513	2014 UC_{235}	—	October 23, 2014	Kitt Peak	Spacewatch	·	1.0 km	MPC · JPL
672514	2014 UP_{235}	—	July 16, 2013	Haleakala	Pan-STARRS 1	·	2.7 km	MPC · JPL
672515	2014 UK_{238}	—	October 28, 2014	Haleakala	Pan-STARRS 1	MAR	930 m	MPC · JPL
672516	2014 UJ_{240}	—	October 30, 2014	Mount Lemmon	Mount Lemmon Survey	KON	1.8 km	MPC · JPL
672517	2014 US_{241}	—	October 3, 2014	Mount Lemmon	Mount Lemmon Survey	(5)	1.1 km	MPC · JPL
672518	2014 UT_{241}	—	January 10, 2007	Kitt Peak	Spacewatch	H	480 m	MPC · JPL
672519	2014 UW_{241}	—	October 16, 2014	Kitt Peak	Spacewatch	(5)	670 m	MPC · JPL
672520	2014 UD_{242}	—	October 25, 2014	Haleakala	Pan-STARRS 1	V	540 m	MPC · JPL
672521	2014 UM_{242}	—	October 25, 2014	Haleakala	Pan-STARRS 1	·	590 m	MPC · JPL
672522	2014 UB_{247}	—	October 31, 2014	Mount Lemmon	Mount Lemmon Survey	(5)	890 m	MPC · JPL
672523	2014 US_{247}	—	October 31, 2014	Mount Lemmon	Mount Lemmon Survey	·	980 m	MPC · JPL
672524	2014 UT_{247}	—	October 22, 2014	Mount Lemmon	Mount Lemmon Survey	·	1.0 km	MPC · JPL
672525	2014 UF_{248}	—	October 29, 2014	Haleakala	Pan-STARRS 1	·	960 m	MPC · JPL
672526	2014 UR_{259}	—	October 27, 2014	Haleakala	Pan-STARRS 1	·	950 m	MPC · JPL
672527	2014 UA_{262}	—	October 16, 2014	Mount Lemmon	Mount Lemmon Survey	·	1.5 km	MPC · JPL
672528	2014 UP_{270}	—	October 17, 2014	Mount Lemmon	Mount Lemmon Survey	·	790 m	MPC · JPL
672529	2014 UQ_{274}	—	October 26, 2014	Mount Lemmon	Mount Lemmon Survey	·	1.1 km	MPC · JPL
672530	2014 US_{274}	—	October 28, 2014	Haleakala	Pan-STARRS 1	·	1 km	MPC · JPL
672531	2014 VU_{1}	—	November 9, 2014	Haleakala	Pan-STARRS 1	AMO	630 m	MPC · JPL
672532	2014 VT_{2}	—	August 23, 2008	Marly	P. Kocher	·	3.6 km	MPC · JPL
672533	2014 VF_{7}	—	July 27, 2014	Haleakala	Pan-STARRS 1	·	1.2 km	MPC · JPL
672534	2014 VN_{7}	—	November 12, 2014	Haleakala	Pan-STARRS 1	MAS	500 m	MPC · JPL
672535	2014 VZ_{7}	—	October 14, 2001	Kitt Peak	Spacewatch	·	970 m	MPC · JPL
672536	2014 VX_{8}	—	October 20, 2001	Socorro	LINEAR	·	1.1 km	MPC · JPL
672537	2014 VR_{9}	—	November 12, 2014	Haleakala	Pan-STARRS 1	·	2.8 km	MPC · JPL
672538	2014 VT_{9}	—	November 12, 2014	Haleakala	Pan-STARRS 1	·	960 m	MPC · JPL
672539	2014 VS_{10}	—	November 11, 2014	Kitt Peak	Spacewatch	BRG	1.2 km	MPC · JPL
672540	2014 VV_{11}	—	October 22, 2014	Catalina	CSS	PHO	540 m	MPC · JPL
672541	2014 VG_{12}	—	October 21, 2003	Kitt Peak	Spacewatch	·	850 m	MPC · JPL
672542	2014 VX_{13}	—	August 31, 2014	Haleakala	Pan-STARRS 1	EUN	850 m	MPC · JPL
672543	2014 VS_{15}	—	November 14, 2014	Sandlot	G. Hug	(5)	780 m	MPC · JPL
672544	2014 VY_{16}	—	October 26, 2014	Mount Lemmon	Mount Lemmon Survey	(5)	860 m	MPC · JPL
672545	2014 VL_{17}	—	October 7, 2014	Haleakala	Pan-STARRS 1	·	790 m	MPC · JPL
672546	2014 VX_{19}	—	November 18, 2003	Kitt Peak	Spacewatch	·	2.2 km	MPC · JPL
672547	2014 VX_{20}	—	September 27, 2003	Kitt Peak	Spacewatch	·	2.5 km	MPC · JPL
672548	2014 VG_{23}	—	January 27, 2007	Mount Lemmon	Mount Lemmon Survey	·	950 m	MPC · JPL
672549	2014 VQ_{25}	—	October 22, 2014	Mount Lemmon	Mount Lemmon Survey	KON	2.0 km	MPC · JPL
672550	2014 VR_{25}	—	November 12, 2014	Haleakala	Pan-STARRS 1	MAR	730 m	MPC · JPL
672551	2014 VA_{26}	—	November 12, 2014	Haleakala	Pan-STARRS 1	H	500 m	MPC · JPL
672552	2014 VG_{26}	—	November 12, 2014	Haleakala	Pan-STARRS 1	·	2.1 km	MPC · JPL
672553	2014 VG_{27}	—	March 26, 2011	Mount Lemmon	Mount Lemmon Survey	·	3.4 km	MPC · JPL
672554	2014 VH_{28}	—	September 13, 2004	Kitt Peak	Spacewatch	·	590 m	MPC · JPL
672555	2014 VN_{31}	—	November 14, 2014	Kitt Peak	Spacewatch	·	920 m	MPC · JPL
672556	2014 VA_{32}	—	November 17, 2006	Mount Lemmon	Mount Lemmon Survey	·	680 m	MPC · JPL
672557	2014 VM_{33}	—	November 14, 2014	Kitt Peak	Spacewatch	·	1.0 km	MPC · JPL
672558	2014 VR_{34}	—	October 22, 2014	Mount Lemmon	Mount Lemmon Survey	T_{j} (2.96) · 3:2	3.4 km	MPC · JPL
672559	2014 VF_{35}	—	October 23, 2003	Kitt Peak	Spacewatch	MAS	530 m	MPC · JPL
672560	2014 VG_{35}	—	October 20, 2003	Kitt Peak	Spacewatch	NYS	760 m	MPC · JPL
672561	2014 VX_{36}	—	October 25, 2014	Kitt Peak	Spacewatch	·	990 m	MPC · JPL
672562	2014 VY_{38}	—	November 1, 2014	Mount Lemmon	Mount Lemmon Survey	·	1.1 km	MPC · JPL
672563	2014 VB_{39}	—	November 4, 2014	Mount Lemmon	Mount Lemmon Survey	·	1.2 km	MPC · JPL
672564	2014 VO_{40}	—	November 3, 2014	Mount Lemmon	Mount Lemmon Survey	·	1.3 km	MPC · JPL
672565	2014 VF_{41}	—	January 16, 2016	Haleakala	Pan-STARRS 1	EUN	1.1 km	MPC · JPL
672566	2014 WD_{3}	—	November 14, 2010	Mount Lemmon	Mount Lemmon Survey	(5)	940 m	MPC · JPL
672567	2014 WR_{3}	—	November 16, 2014	Catalina	CSS	·	3.1 km	MPC · JPL
672568	2014 WA_{8}	—	October 4, 2007	Kitt Peak	Spacewatch	·	650 m	MPC · JPL
672569	2014 WP_{8}	—	October 29, 2010	Kitt Peak	Spacewatch	(5)	900 m	MPC · JPL
672570	2014 WA_{10}	—	April 15, 2007	Kitt Peak	Spacewatch	·	1.7 km	MPC · JPL
672571	2014 WF_{16}	—	October 28, 2014	Kitt Peak	Spacewatch	·	840 m	MPC · JPL
672572	2014 WL_{17}	—	November 16, 2014	Mount Lemmon	Mount Lemmon Survey	·	980 m	MPC · JPL
672573	2014 WS_{18}	—	November 16, 2014	Mount Lemmon	Mount Lemmon Survey	·	800 m	MPC · JPL
672574	2014 WT_{19}	—	October 3, 2014	Mount Lemmon	Mount Lemmon Survey	(5)	990 m	MPC · JPL
672575	2014 WU_{19}	—	December 1, 2010	Kitt Peak	Spacewatch	(5)	890 m	MPC · JPL
672576	2014 WW_{23}	—	November 17, 2014	Mount Lemmon	Mount Lemmon Survey	·	1.3 km	MPC · JPL
672577	2014 WK_{29}	—	November 17, 2014	Mount Lemmon	Mount Lemmon Survey	(5)	910 m	MPC · JPL
672578	2014 WU_{30}	—	September 18, 2003	Kitt Peak	Spacewatch	·	970 m	MPC · JPL
672579	2014 WL_{31}	—	September 3, 2002	Palomar	NEAT	·	2.9 km	MPC · JPL
672580	2014 WU_{31}	—	September 22, 2003	Kitt Peak	Spacewatch	·	2.4 km	MPC · JPL
672581	2014 WV_{39}	—	November 7, 2010	Kitt Peak	Spacewatch	(5)	830 m	MPC · JPL
672582	2014 WE_{44}	—	November 8, 2010	Kitt Peak	Spacewatch	·	610 m	MPC · JPL
672583	2014 WK_{44}	—	November 4, 2007	Kitt Peak	Spacewatch	·	790 m	MPC · JPL
672584	2014 WV_{44}	—	October 21, 2014	Mount Lemmon	Mount Lemmon Survey	·	890 m	MPC · JPL
672585	2014 WW_{46}	—	May 9, 2013	Haleakala	Pan-STARRS 1	MAS	610 m	MPC · JPL
672586	2014 WJ_{49}	—	September 5, 2010	Mount Lemmon	Mount Lemmon Survey	MAS	650 m	MPC · JPL
672587	2014 WM_{51}	—	October 21, 2014	Kitt Peak	Spacewatch	·	910 m	MPC · JPL
672588	2014 WA_{53}	—	November 12, 2010	Kitt Peak	Spacewatch	·	890 m	MPC · JPL
672589	2014 WY_{54}	—	January 27, 2007	Mount Lemmon	Mount Lemmon Survey	·	910 m	MPC · JPL
672590	2014 WL_{55}	—	November 17, 2006	Mount Lemmon	Mount Lemmon Survey	·	1.2 km	MPC · JPL
672591	2014 WM_{55}	—	November 17, 2014	Haleakala	Pan-STARRS 1	NYS	1.0 km	MPC · JPL
672592	2014 WW_{55}	—	November 17, 2014	Haleakala	Pan-STARRS 1	·	1.3 km	MPC · JPL
672593	2014 WJ_{59}	—	November 5, 1996	Kitt Peak	Spacewatch	·	880 m	MPC · JPL
672594	2014 WZ_{59}	—	October 5, 2014	Mount Lemmon	Mount Lemmon Survey	·	1.4 km	MPC · JPL
672595	2014 WG_{61}	—	April 24, 2007	Kitt Peak	Spacewatch	·	2.4 km	MPC · JPL
672596	2014 WT_{63}	—	April 20, 2006	Kitt Peak	Spacewatch	·	3.0 km	MPC · JPL
672597	2014 WP_{71}	—	September 20, 2003	Kitt Peak	Spacewatch	·	2.2 km	MPC · JPL
672598	2014 WM_{72}	—	October 31, 2014	Mount Lemmon	Mount Lemmon Survey	·	1.1 km	MPC · JPL
672599	2014 WF_{73}	—	November 17, 2014	Kitt Peak	Spacewatch	·	810 m	MPC · JPL
672600	2014 WB_{74}	—	September 5, 2008	Kitt Peak	Spacewatch	·	2.9 km	MPC · JPL

== 672601–672700 ==
back to top

Designation			Discovery			Properties		Ref
Permanent	Provisional	Named after	Date	Site	Discoverer(s)	Category	Diam.	Ref
672601	2014 WG_{76}	—	October 25, 2014	Haleakala	Pan-STARRS 1	MAS	610 m	MPC · JPL
672602	2014 WZ_{79}	—	November 17, 2014	Mount Lemmon	Mount Lemmon Survey	·	1.1 km	MPC · JPL
672603	2014 WC_{95}	—	November 17, 2014	Mount Lemmon	Mount Lemmon Survey	·	870 m	MPC · JPL
672604	2014 WN_{96}	—	September 26, 2008	Kitt Peak	Spacewatch	·	2.5 km	MPC · JPL
672605	2014 WY_{102}	—	October 1, 2003	Kitt Peak	Spacewatch	MAS	600 m	MPC · JPL
672606	2014 WC_{105}	—	September 2, 2014	Haleakala	Pan-STARRS 1	·	1.4 km	MPC · JPL
672607	2014 WT_{107}	—	September 26, 2002	Palomar	NEAT	·	3.5 km	MPC · JPL
672608	2014 WY_{112}	—	August 25, 2003	Palomar	NEAT	·	3.4 km	MPC · JPL
672609	2014 WP_{113}	—	September 3, 2014	Catalina	CSS	·	2.0 km	MPC · JPL
672610	2014 WG_{114}	—	July 30, 2008	Mount Lemmon	Mount Lemmon Survey	·	3.1 km	MPC · JPL
672611	2014 WC_{116}	—	August 26, 2003	Cerro Tololo	Deep Ecliptic Survey	·	1.7 km	MPC · JPL
672612	2014 WF_{116}	—	March 7, 2011	Piszkés-tető	K. Sárneczky, J. Kelemen	·	3.6 km	MPC · JPL
672613	2014 WL_{116}	—	October 18, 2009	Mount Lemmon	Mount Lemmon Survey	·	2.1 km	MPC · JPL
672614	2014 WO_{117}	—	November 16, 2014	Mount Lemmon	Mount Lemmon Survey	·	870 m	MPC · JPL
672615	2014 WU_{118}	—	November 20, 2014	Kitt Peak	Spacewatch	·	1.2 km	MPC · JPL
672616	2014 WF_{121}	—	May 13, 2005	Kitt Peak	Spacewatch	H	600 m	MPC · JPL
672617	2014 WK_{122}	—	November 16, 2014	Kitt Peak	Spacewatch	EUN	1.1 km	MPC · JPL
672618	2014 WN_{122}	—	November 16, 2014	Kitt Peak	Spacewatch	KON	1.9 km	MPC · JPL
672619	2014 WR_{122}	—	January 5, 2003	Socorro	LINEAR	·	900 m	MPC · JPL
672620	2014 WD_{127}	—	September 16, 2009	Kitt Peak	Spacewatch	HOF	2.1 km	MPC · JPL
672621	2014 WK_{127}	—	November 4, 2014	Mount Lemmon	Mount Lemmon Survey	·	910 m	MPC · JPL
672622	2014 WQ_{127}	—	November 3, 2014	Mount Lemmon	Mount Lemmon Survey	·	1.1 km	MPC · JPL
672623	2014 WR_{130}	—	March 22, 2009	Mount Lemmon	Mount Lemmon Survey	NYS	980 m	MPC · JPL
672624	2014 WA_{131}	—	April 11, 2005	Mount Lemmon	Mount Lemmon Survey	·	900 m	MPC · JPL
672625	2014 WL_{131}	—	November 13, 2010	Kitt Peak	Spacewatch	·	1.1 km	MPC · JPL
672626	2014 WH_{132}	—	April 11, 2002	Palomar	NEAT	PHO	770 m	MPC · JPL
672627	2014 WK_{132}	—	November 17, 2014	Haleakala	Pan-STARRS 1	·	1.2 km	MPC · JPL
672628	2014 WN_{138}	—	November 17, 2014	Haleakala	Pan-STARRS 1	·	2.4 km	MPC · JPL
672629	2014 WP_{138}	—	October 29, 2003	Kitt Peak	Spacewatch	·	1.1 km	MPC · JPL
672630	2014 WJ_{141}	—	September 18, 2001	Kitt Peak	Spacewatch	·	890 m	MPC · JPL
672631	2014 WF_{143}	—	October 17, 2010	Mount Lemmon	Mount Lemmon Survey	·	1.4 km	MPC · JPL
672632	2014 WL_{144}	—	November 17, 2014	Haleakala	Pan-STARRS 1	(5)	980 m	MPC · JPL
672633	2014 WF_{149}	—	October 22, 2009	Mount Lemmon	Mount Lemmon Survey	EOS	1.5 km	MPC · JPL
672634	2014 WJ_{150}	—	October 8, 2008	Kitt Peak	Spacewatch	·	2.6 km	MPC · JPL
672635	2014 WX_{151}	—	November 13, 2010	Mount Lemmon	Mount Lemmon Survey	·	810 m	MPC · JPL
672636	2014 WL_{156}	—	March 12, 2005	Kitt Peak	Spacewatch	·	1.1 km	MPC · JPL
672637	2014 WU_{156}	—	October 1, 2010	Mount Lemmon	Mount Lemmon Survey	·	1.0 km	MPC · JPL
672638	2014 WA_{157}	—	October 22, 2014	Catalina	CSS	NYS	1.2 km	MPC · JPL
672639	2014 WZ_{158}	—	December 11, 2010	Kitt Peak	Spacewatch	·	870 m	MPC · JPL
672640	2014 WX_{160}	—	September 6, 2014	Mount Lemmon	Mount Lemmon Survey	·	1.6 km	MPC · JPL
672641	2014 WJ_{161}	—	July 28, 2005	Palomar	NEAT	(1547)	1.2 km	MPC · JPL
672642	2014 WN_{161}	—	September 4, 2014	Haleakala	Pan-STARRS 1	·	890 m	MPC · JPL
672643	2014 WK_{162}	—	July 1, 2013	Haleakala	Pan-STARRS 1	T_{j} (2.95)	3.3 km	MPC · JPL
672644	2014 WR_{163}	—	December 23, 2005	Socorro	LINEAR	·	1.5 km	MPC · JPL
672645	2014 WT_{163}	—	March 22, 2012	Mount Lemmon	Mount Lemmon Survey	·	870 m	MPC · JPL
672646	2014 WH_{166}	—	June 18, 2013	Haleakala	Pan-STARRS 1	·	1.5 km	MPC · JPL
672647	2014 WX_{172}	—	August 23, 2014	Haleakala	Pan-STARRS 1	GEF	1.1 km	MPC · JPL
672648	2014 WX_{184}	—	November 20, 2014	Mount Lemmon	Mount Lemmon Survey	·	910 m	MPC · JPL
672649	2014 WZ_{184}	—	November 20, 2014	Mount Lemmon	Mount Lemmon Survey	JUN	640 m	MPC · JPL
672650	2014 WN_{190}	—	April 30, 2012	Kitt Peak	Spacewatch	·	1 km	MPC · JPL
672651	2014 WD_{192}	—	November 20, 2014	Haleakala	Pan-STARRS 1	MAR	760 m	MPC · JPL
672652	2014 WT_{196}	—	October 31, 2014	Mount Lemmon	Mount Lemmon Survey	·	920 m	MPC · JPL
672653	2014 WG_{201}	—	April 6, 2013	Haleakala	Pan-STARRS 1	·	670 m	MPC · JPL
672654	2014 WT_{201}	—	October 29, 2014	Haleakala	Pan-STARRS 1	H	410 m	MPC · JPL
672655	2014 WD_{210}	—	January 2, 2011	Mount Lemmon	Mount Lemmon Survey	·	840 m	MPC · JPL
672656	2014 WY_{210}	—	November 14, 2014	Kitt Peak	Spacewatch	·	1.3 km	MPC · JPL
672657	2014 WQ_{212}	—	October 23, 2003	Apache Point	SDSS Collaboration	·	3.1 km	MPC · JPL
672658	2014 WT_{213}	—	May 1, 2012	Mount Lemmon	Mount Lemmon Survey	·	830 m	MPC · JPL
672659	2014 WH_{217}	—	November 18, 2014	Haleakala	Pan-STARRS 1	·	1.3 km	MPC · JPL
672660	2014 WH_{218}	—	October 17, 2010	Mount Lemmon	Mount Lemmon Survey	·	1.4 km	MPC · JPL
672661	2014 WD_{220}	—	November 18, 2014	Haleakala	Pan-STARRS 1	·	1.1 km	MPC · JPL
672662	2014 WV_{220}	—	December 1, 2010	Mount Lemmon	Mount Lemmon Survey	·	1.4 km	MPC · JPL
672663	2014 WW_{220}	—	October 26, 2014	Mount Lemmon	Mount Lemmon Survey	·	590 m	MPC · JPL
672664	2014 WT_{225}	—	November 18, 2014	Haleakala	Pan-STARRS 1	·	1.0 km	MPC · JPL
672665	2014 WY_{232}	—	October 22, 2014	Mount Lemmon	Mount Lemmon Survey	·	1.2 km	MPC · JPL
672666	2014 WQ_{233}	—	November 28, 2011	Mount Lemmon	Mount Lemmon Survey	·	640 m	MPC · JPL
672667	2014 WV_{234}	—	November 20, 2014	Catalina	CSS	·	1.1 km	MPC · JPL
672668	2014 WT_{236}	—	October 25, 2005	Kitt Peak	Spacewatch	·	1.2 km	MPC · JPL
672669	2014 WA_{240}	—	April 28, 2012	Mount Lemmon	Mount Lemmon Survey	EUP	3.4 km	MPC · JPL
672670	2014 WS_{241}	—	December 17, 2009	Mount Lemmon	Mount Lemmon Survey	·	3.4 km	MPC · JPL
672671	2014 WN_{242}	—	January 27, 2011	Mount Lemmon	Mount Lemmon Survey	·	3.1 km	MPC · JPL
672672	2014 WO_{242}	—	October 2, 2003	Kitt Peak	Spacewatch	·	4.1 km	MPC · JPL
672673	2014 WQ_{242}	—	July 8, 2003	Kitt Peak	Spacewatch	EOS	1.7 km	MPC · JPL
672674	2014 WS_{242}	—	November 11, 2004	Kitt Peak	Spacewatch	EOS	2.0 km	MPC · JPL
672675	2014 WZ_{242}	—	October 15, 2009	Mount Lemmon	Mount Lemmon Survey	·	2.8 km	MPC · JPL
672676	2014 WS_{243}	—	December 5, 2010	Mount Lemmon	Mount Lemmon Survey	·	3.1 km	MPC · JPL
672677	2014 WO_{244}	—	October 9, 2004	Kitt Peak	Spacewatch	·	2.2 km	MPC · JPL
672678	2014 WR_{244}	—	October 29, 2014	Haleakala	Pan-STARRS 1	EUN	810 m	MPC · JPL
672679	2014 WU_{244}	—	September 12, 2007	Kitt Peak	Spacewatch	·	650 m	MPC · JPL
672680	2014 WB_{245}	—	September 14, 2014	Haleakala	Pan-STARRS 1	·	1.4 km	MPC · JPL
672681	2014 WM_{247}	—	October 28, 2014	Haleakala	Pan-STARRS 1	·	1.3 km	MPC · JPL
672682	2014 WO_{247}	—	November 13, 2007	Mount Lemmon	Mount Lemmon Survey	·	970 m	MPC · JPL
672683	2014 WO_{249}	—	May 7, 2010	Kitt Peak	Spacewatch	BAP	810 m	MPC · JPL
672684	2014 WC_{254}	—	August 26, 2013	Haleakala	Pan-STARRS 1	3:2	4.4 km	MPC · JPL
672685	2014 WX_{261}	—	October 22, 2014	Kitt Peak	Spacewatch	GEF	830 m	MPC · JPL
672686	2014 WY_{262}	—	December 6, 2010	Mount Lemmon	Mount Lemmon Survey	·	1.0 km	MPC · JPL
672687	2014 WF_{265}	—	March 10, 2011	Mount Lemmon	Mount Lemmon Survey	·	2.6 km	MPC · JPL
672688	2014 WU_{269}	—	December 3, 2010	Kitt Peak	Spacewatch	·	950 m	MPC · JPL
672689	2014 WA_{270}	—	November 21, 2014	Haleakala	Pan-STARRS 1	·	910 m	MPC · JPL
672690	2014 WK_{275}	—	November 21, 2014	Haleakala	Pan-STARRS 1	·	710 m	MPC · JPL
672691	2014 WR_{275}	—	August 14, 2013	Haleakala	Pan-STARRS 1	EOS	1.6 km	MPC · JPL
672692	2014 WF_{276}	—	March 19, 2009	Kitt Peak	Spacewatch	·	710 m	MPC · JPL
672693	2014 WX_{276}	—	October 16, 2014	Mount Lemmon	Mount Lemmon Survey	·	1.2 km	MPC · JPL
672694	2014 WK_{277}	—	January 4, 2012	Kitt Peak	Spacewatch	·	650 m	MPC · JPL
672695	2014 WR_{280}	—	November 21, 2014	Haleakala	Pan-STARRS 1	·	970 m	MPC · JPL
672696	2014 WC_{282}	—	November 21, 2014	Haleakala	Pan-STARRS 1	·	990 m	MPC · JPL
672697	2014 WF_{289}	—	November 21, 2014	Haleakala	Pan-STARRS 1	·	910 m	MPC · JPL
672698	2014 WV_{289}	—	July 2, 2013	Haleakala	Pan-STARRS 1	·	3.3 km	MPC · JPL
672699	2014 WV_{292}	—	October 26, 2014	Haleakala	Pan-STARRS 1	·	2.1 km	MPC · JPL
672700	2014 WR_{293}	—	November 21, 2014	Haleakala	Pan-STARRS 1	·	890 m	MPC · JPL

== 672701–672800 ==
back to top

Designation			Discovery			Properties		Ref
Permanent	Provisional	Named after	Date	Site	Discoverer(s)	Category	Diam.	Ref
672701	2014 WX_{297}	—	September 22, 2014	Haleakala	Pan-STARRS 1	·	890 m	MPC · JPL
672702	2014 WH_{298}	—	November 21, 2014	Haleakala	Pan-STARRS 1	·	950 m	MPC · JPL
672703	2014 WS_{298}	—	July 19, 2001	Palomar	NEAT	·	4.2 km	MPC · JPL
672704	2014 WO_{300}	—	October 16, 2014	Nogales	M. Schwartz, P. R. Holvorcem	·	1.2 km	MPC · JPL
672705	2014 WM_{301}	—	March 16, 2007	Mount Lemmon	Mount Lemmon Survey	·	3.0 km	MPC · JPL
672706	2014 WV_{302}	—	January 24, 2007	Kitt Peak	Spacewatch	·	890 m	MPC · JPL
672707	2014 WX_{302}	—	December 4, 2007	Kitt Peak	Spacewatch	·	1.3 km	MPC · JPL
672708	2014 WW_{303}	—	March 2, 2006	Mount Lemmon	Mount Lemmon Survey	·	2.2 km	MPC · JPL
672709	2014 WN_{306}	—	October 30, 2014	Mount Lemmon	Mount Lemmon Survey	EUN	780 m	MPC · JPL
672710	2014 WS_{308}	—	November 22, 2014	Mount Lemmon	Mount Lemmon Survey	·	1.2 km	MPC · JPL
672711	2014 WC_{311}	—	October 3, 2014	Mount Lemmon	Mount Lemmon Survey	·	740 m	MPC · JPL
672712	2014 WY_{312}	—	January 26, 2011	Mount Lemmon	Mount Lemmon Survey	VER	3.1 km	MPC · JPL
672713	2014 WZ_{313}	—	April 19, 2007	Mount Lemmon	Mount Lemmon Survey	EOS	2.0 km	MPC · JPL
672714	2014 WR_{314}	—	April 20, 2012	Kitt Peak	Spacewatch	·	3.0 km	MPC · JPL
672715	2014 WN_{315}	—	May 14, 2007	Mount Lemmon	Mount Lemmon Survey	·	3.4 km	MPC · JPL
672716	2014 WX_{317}	—	August 25, 2014	Haleakala	Pan-STARRS 1	·	810 m	MPC · JPL
672717	2014 WB_{318}	—	September 18, 2014	Haleakala	Pan-STARRS 1	EOS	1.6 km	MPC · JPL
672718	2014 WX_{320}	—	August 31, 2014	Haleakala	Pan-STARRS 1	·	890 m	MPC · JPL
672719	2014 WH_{325}	—	April 25, 2007	Mount Lemmon	Mount Lemmon Survey	·	1.6 km	MPC · JPL
672720	2014 WU_{326}	—	October 29, 2014	Haleakala	Pan-STARRS 1	BRG	990 m	MPC · JPL
672721	2014 WC_{327}	—	August 29, 2014	Haleakala	Pan-STARRS 1	·	1.6 km	MPC · JPL
672722	2014 WR_{328}	—	January 23, 2006	Kitt Peak	Spacewatch	·	2.2 km	MPC · JPL
672723	2014 WD_{329}	—	November 22, 2014	Haleakala	Pan-STARRS 1	VER	2.7 km	MPC · JPL
672724	2014 WZ_{331}	—	November 22, 2014	Haleakala	Pan-STARRS 1	·	3.1 km	MPC · JPL
672725	2014 WP_{333}	—	May 27, 2006	Catalina	CSS	URS	3.1 km	MPC · JPL
672726	2014 WY_{337}	—	November 22, 2014	Haleakala	Pan-STARRS 1	·	1.1 km	MPC · JPL
672727	2014 WC_{338}	—	September 20, 2014	Haleakala	Pan-STARRS 1	ADE	1.2 km	MPC · JPL
672728	2014 WC_{339}	—	March 6, 2011	Mount Lemmon	Mount Lemmon Survey	·	2.5 km	MPC · JPL
672729	2014 WE_{339}	—	September 23, 2014	Haleakala	Pan-STARRS 1	·	1.0 km	MPC · JPL
672730	2014 WD_{342}	—	November 24, 2003	Kitt Peak	Spacewatch	·	3.7 km	MPC · JPL
672731	2014 WR_{347}	—	September 11, 2005	Kitt Peak	Spacewatch	·	1.0 km	MPC · JPL
672732	2014 WH_{349}	—	November 22, 2014	Haleakala	Pan-STARRS 1	·	1.2 km	MPC · JPL
672733	2014 WX_{349}	—	October 29, 2014	Catalina	CSS	·	1.2 km	MPC · JPL
672734	2014 WP_{353}	—	November 23, 2014	Haleakala	Pan-STARRS 1	·	890 m	MPC · JPL
672735	2014 WG_{355}	—	October 2, 2013	Kitt Peak	Spacewatch	T_{j} (2.98) · 3:2	4.4 km	MPC · JPL
672736	2014 WV_{356}	—	October 26, 2014	Mount Lemmon	Mount Lemmon Survey	·	1.0 km	MPC · JPL
672737	2014 WQ_{357}	—	January 19, 2004	Kitt Peak	Spacewatch	V	660 m	MPC · JPL
672738	2014 WT_{357}	—	October 26, 2014	Mount Lemmon	Mount Lemmon Survey	·	900 m	MPC · JPL
672739	2014 WL_{358}	—	October 30, 2010	Mount Lemmon	Mount Lemmon Survey	·	1.3 km	MPC · JPL
672740	2014 WN_{358}	—	October 26, 2014	Mount Lemmon	Mount Lemmon Survey	·	1.0 km	MPC · JPL
672741	2014 WJ_{359}	—	August 31, 2010	ESA OGS	ESA OGS	·	920 m	MPC · JPL
672742	2014 WR_{359}	—	September 2, 2014	Haleakala	Pan-STARRS 1	·	980 m	MPC · JPL
672743	2014 WW_{359}	—	March 24, 2011	Piszkés-tető	K. Sárneczky, Z. Kuli	EOS	1.9 km	MPC · JPL
672744	2014 WU_{361}	—	February 25, 2012	Mount Lemmon	Mount Lemmon Survey	·	1.5 km	MPC · JPL
672745	2014 WV_{363}	—	November 24, 2014	Haleakala	Pan-STARRS 1	APO · PHA	550 m	MPC · JPL
672746	2014 WE_{369}	—	November 22, 2006	Mount Lemmon	Mount Lemmon Survey	H	500 m	MPC · JPL
672747	2014 WV_{372}	—	November 4, 2014	Mount Lemmon	Mount Lemmon Survey	·	990 m	MPC · JPL
672748	2014 WX_{380}	—	October 30, 2014	Mount Lemmon	Mount Lemmon Survey	·	810 m	MPC · JPL
672749	2014 WW_{383}	—	September 28, 2003	Anderson Mesa	LONEOS	·	3.0 km	MPC · JPL
672750	2014 WH_{387}	—	September 6, 2008	Kitt Peak	Spacewatch	·	1.9 km	MPC · JPL
672751	2014 WL_{387}	—	November 23, 2014	Haleakala	Pan-STARRS 1	·	980 m	MPC · JPL
672752	2014 WM_{389}	—	January 27, 2007	Mount Lemmon	Mount Lemmon Survey	EUN	860 m	MPC · JPL
672753	2014 WW_{389}	—	September 14, 2007	Kitt Peak	Spacewatch	·	3.7 km	MPC · JPL
672754	2014 WW_{390}	—	September 11, 2010	Mount Lemmon	Mount Lemmon Survey	·	1.1 km	MPC · JPL
672755	2014 WK_{391}	—	November 24, 2014	Mount Lemmon	Mount Lemmon Survey	JUN	820 m	MPC · JPL
672756	2014 WW_{391}	—	November 24, 2014	Mount Lemmon	Mount Lemmon Survey	EUN	850 m	MPC · JPL
672757	2014 WN_{394}	—	October 28, 2014	Haleakala	Pan-STARRS 1	·	870 m	MPC · JPL
672758	2014 WT_{397}	—	July 1, 2013	Haleakala	Pan-STARRS 1	·	3.0 km	MPC · JPL
672759	2014 WE_{399}	—	December 15, 2009	Mount Lemmon	Mount Lemmon Survey	·	2.9 km	MPC · JPL
672760	2014 WG_{400}	—	October 31, 2014	Mount Lemmon	Mount Lemmon Survey	·	1.4 km	MPC · JPL
672761	2014 WU_{403}	—	October 31, 2014	Mount Lemmon	Mount Lemmon Survey	·	1.2 km	MPC · JPL
672762	2014 WA_{407}	—	October 24, 2014	Mount Lemmon	Mount Lemmon Survey	·	1.2 km	MPC · JPL
672763	2014 WB_{409}	—	November 27, 2006	Mount Lemmon	Mount Lemmon Survey	·	1.0 km	MPC · JPL
672764	2014 WR_{409}	—	November 26, 2014	Haleakala	Pan-STARRS 1	·	940 m	MPC · JPL
672765	2014 WB_{410}	—	November 26, 2014	Haleakala	Pan-STARRS 1	KON	1.6 km	MPC · JPL
672766	2014 WE_{410}	—	December 6, 2010	Kitt Peak	Spacewatch	·	1.2 km	MPC · JPL
672767	2014 WJ_{410}	—	December 17, 2001	Socorro	LINEAR	·	1.8 km	MPC · JPL
672768	2014 WM_{410}	—	September 4, 2014	Haleakala	Pan-STARRS 1	·	1.5 km	MPC · JPL
672769	2014 WH_{412}	—	November 26, 2014	Haleakala	Pan-STARRS 1	VER	2.6 km	MPC · JPL
672770	2014 WC_{417}	—	September 20, 2014	Haleakala	Pan-STARRS 1	·	820 m	MPC · JPL
672771	2014 WH_{417}	—	October 18, 2014	Mount Lemmon	Mount Lemmon Survey	·	1.0 km	MPC · JPL
672772	2014 WN_{418}	—	November 26, 2014	Haleakala	Pan-STARRS 1	·	1.0 km	MPC · JPL
672773	2014 WW_{421}	—	February 26, 2012	Haleakala	Pan-STARRS 1	V	680 m	MPC · JPL
672774	2014 WG_{424}	—	November 26, 2014	Haleakala	Pan-STARRS 1	JUN	750 m	MPC · JPL
672775	2014 WS_{424}	—	November 26, 2014	Haleakala	Pan-STARRS 1	·	1.6 km	MPC · JPL
672776	2014 WY_{426}	—	October 11, 2010	Mount Lemmon	Mount Lemmon Survey	·	730 m	MPC · JPL
672777	2014 WD_{429}	—	November 26, 2014	Haleakala	Pan-STARRS 1	GAL	1.5 km	MPC · JPL
672778	2014 WT_{429}	—	October 3, 2014	Mount Lemmon	Mount Lemmon Survey	MAR	660 m	MPC · JPL
672779	2014 WX_{431}	—	October 25, 2014	Kitt Peak	Spacewatch	·	1.1 km	MPC · JPL
672780	2014 WK_{433}	—	November 19, 2014	Haleakala	Pan-STARRS 1	·	960 m	MPC · JPL
672781	2014 WP_{433}	—	November 17, 2014	Haleakala	Pan-STARRS 1	EUN	1.2 km	MPC · JPL
672782	2014 WB_{435}	—	November 23, 2014	Haleakala	Pan-STARRS 1	·	860 m	MPC · JPL
672783	2014 WC_{437}	—	January 24, 2011	Mount Lemmon	Mount Lemmon Survey	·	1.0 km	MPC · JPL
672784	2014 WY_{437}	—	October 24, 2001	Socorro	LINEAR	·	670 m	MPC · JPL
672785	2014 WZ_{437}	—	November 17, 2014	Haleakala	Pan-STARRS 1	·	1.0 km	MPC · JPL
672786	2014 WY_{441}	—	November 27, 2014	Haleakala	Pan-STARRS 1	·	900 m	MPC · JPL
672787	2014 WE_{442}	—	December 25, 2009	Kitt Peak	Spacewatch	·	2.9 km	MPC · JPL
672788	2014 WD_{447}	—	November 20, 2006	Mount Lemmon	Mount Lemmon Survey	·	1.1 km	MPC · JPL
672789	2014 WY_{450}	—	November 27, 2014	Mount Lemmon	Mount Lemmon Survey	·	2.6 km	MPC · JPL
672790	2014 WR_{451}	—	November 27, 2014	Haleakala	Pan-STARRS 1	·	1.2 km	MPC · JPL
672791	2014 WD_{454}	—	November 21, 2014	Haleakala	Pan-STARRS 1	ADE	1.2 km	MPC · JPL
672792	2014 WX_{454}	—	September 18, 2014	Haleakala	Pan-STARRS 1	·	1.4 km	MPC · JPL
672793	2014 WF_{456}	—	October 2, 2014	Haleakala	Pan-STARRS 1	·	1.5 km	MPC · JPL
672794	2014 WU_{457}	—	October 21, 2014	Kitt Peak	Spacewatch	·	900 m	MPC · JPL
672795	2014 WK_{460}	—	October 24, 2014	Kitt Peak	Spacewatch	·	1.2 km	MPC · JPL
672796	2014 WN_{460}	—	July 15, 2005	Mount Lemmon	Mount Lemmon Survey	·	950 m	MPC · JPL
672797	2014 WR_{460}	—	November 27, 2014	Haleakala	Pan-STARRS 1	EUN	720 m	MPC · JPL
672798	2014 WG_{461}	—	May 13, 2009	Kitt Peak	Spacewatch	NYS	1.0 km	MPC · JPL
672799	2014 WH_{464}	—	November 17, 2014	Haleakala	Pan-STARRS 1	EUN	750 m	MPC · JPL
672800	2014 WA_{466}	—	September 18, 2010	Mount Lemmon	Mount Lemmon Survey	MAS	610 m	MPC · JPL

== 672801–672900 ==
back to top

Designation			Discovery			Properties		Ref
Permanent	Provisional	Named after	Date	Site	Discoverer(s)	Category	Diam.	Ref
672801	2014 WL_{470}	—	November 19, 2001	Socorro	LINEAR	·	1.3 km	MPC · JPL
672802	2014 WL_{474}	—	April 30, 2012	Kitt Peak	Spacewatch	EUN	1 km	MPC · JPL
672803	2014 WF_{476}	—	February 27, 2009	Kitt Peak	Spacewatch	·	850 m	MPC · JPL
672804	2014 WG_{476}	—	December 31, 2007	Mount Lemmon	Mount Lemmon Survey	·	1 km	MPC · JPL
672805	2014 WB_{477}	—	November 28, 2014	Haleakala	Pan-STARRS 1	V	490 m	MPC · JPL
672806	2014 WA_{478}	—	November 28, 2014	Haleakala	Pan-STARRS 1	·	1.4 km	MPC · JPL
672807	2014 WZ_{483}	—	November 19, 2006	Kitt Peak	Spacewatch	·	1.1 km	MPC · JPL
672808	2014 WL_{484}	—	December 17, 2006	Mount Lemmon	Mount Lemmon Survey	·	890 m	MPC · JPL
672809	2014 WH_{485}	—	December 3, 2010	Kitt Peak	Spacewatch	·	1.2 km	MPC · JPL
672810	2014 WD_{486}	—	December 17, 2007	Kitt Peak	Spacewatch	·	680 m	MPC · JPL
672811	2014 WP_{486}	—	July 2, 2013	Haleakala	Pan-STARRS 1	·	890 m	MPC · JPL
672812	2014 WZ_{487}	—	October 4, 2014	Mount Lemmon	Mount Lemmon Survey	·	1.4 km	MPC · JPL
672813	2014 WF_{489}	—	November 20, 2014	Mount Lemmon	Mount Lemmon Survey	·	990 m	MPC · JPL
672814	2014 WV_{490}	—	November 30, 2014	Haleakala	Pan-STARRS 1	EUN	860 m	MPC · JPL
672815	2014 WG_{492}	—	November 22, 2014	Haleakala	Pan-STARRS 1	·	1.2 km	MPC · JPL
672816	2014 WJ_{495}	—	September 1, 2013	Piszkéstető	K. Sárneczky	·	2.4 km	MPC · JPL
672817	2014 WM_{496}	—	November 30, 2014	Haleakala	Pan-STARRS 1	·	1.3 km	MPC · JPL
672818	2014 WO_{497}	—	January 9, 2003	Socorro	LINEAR	·	1.2 km	MPC · JPL
672819	2014 WR_{498}	—	September 3, 2003	Haleakala	NEAT	·	2.6 km	MPC · JPL
672820	2014 WM_{502}	—	January 9, 2007	Mount Lemmon	Mount Lemmon Survey	(5)	1.0 km	MPC · JPL
672821	2014 WV_{502}	—	July 14, 2013	Haleakala	Pan-STARRS 1	·	2.6 km	MPC · JPL
672822	2014 WZ_{503}	—	December 21, 2006	Mount Lemmon	Mount Lemmon Survey	·	1.5 km	MPC · JPL
672823	2014 WC_{505}	—	January 27, 2011	Catalina	CSS	·	890 m	MPC · JPL
672824	2014 WE_{506}	—	August 6, 2014	Haleakala	Pan-STARRS 1	T_{j} (2.99) · 3:2	5.7 km	MPC · JPL
672825	2014 WQ_{506}	—	October 26, 2014	Haleakala	Pan-STARRS 1	·	1.1 km	MPC · JPL
672826	2014 WR_{506}	—	April 18, 2012	Kitt Peak	Spacewatch	·	3.1 km	MPC · JPL
672827	2014 WM_{513}	—	November 17, 2014	Haleakala	Pan-STARRS 1	·	950 m	MPC · JPL
672828	2014 WH_{514}	—	April 15, 2012	Haleakala	Pan-STARRS 1	·	970 m	MPC · JPL
672829	2014 WY_{514}	—	November 29, 2014	Mount Lemmon	Mount Lemmon Survey	(5)	880 m	MPC · JPL
672830	2014 WT_{520}	—	November 17, 2014	Haleakala	Pan-STARRS 1	·	1.6 km	MPC · JPL
672831	2014 WG_{521}	—	November 17, 2014	Haleakala	Pan-STARRS 1	·	1.5 km	MPC · JPL
672832	2014 WT_{522}	—	December 25, 2010	Mount Lemmon	Mount Lemmon Survey	(5)	830 m	MPC · JPL
672833	2014 WA_{524}	—	November 17, 2014	Haleakala	Pan-STARRS 1	BRG	970 m	MPC · JPL
672834	2014 WK_{524}	—	April 21, 2012	Mount Lemmon	Mount Lemmon Survey	MAR	870 m	MPC · JPL
672835	2014 WX_{524}	—	November 19, 2014	Mount Lemmon	Mount Lemmon Survey	·	1.5 km	MPC · JPL
672836	2014 WA_{528}	—	September 25, 2005	Kitt Peak	Spacewatch	·	1.4 km	MPC · JPL
672837	2014 WL_{528}	—	November 4, 2014	Mount Lemmon	Mount Lemmon Survey	·	1.2 km	MPC · JPL
672838	2014 WY_{529}	—	November 23, 2014	Haleakala	Pan-STARRS 1	EUN	940 m	MPC · JPL
672839	2014 WK_{530}	—	November 25, 2014	Haleakala	Pan-STARRS 1	·	1.0 km	MPC · JPL
672840	2014 WQ_{530}	—	March 30, 2008	Kitt Peak	Spacewatch	·	990 m	MPC · JPL
672841	2014 WT_{532}	—	November 27, 2014	Haleakala	Pan-STARRS 1	·	1.2 km	MPC · JPL
672842	2014 WH_{533}	—	November 28, 2014	Haleakala	Pan-STARRS 1	·	1.0 km	MPC · JPL
672843	2014 WN_{533}	—	November 28, 2014	Haleakala	Pan-STARRS 1	ADE	1.5 km	MPC · JPL
672844	2014 WV_{535}	—	November 22, 2014	Haleakala	Pan-STARRS 1	centaur	60 km	MPC · JPL
672845	2014 WB_{537}	—	November 21, 2014	Mount Lemmon	Mount Lemmon Survey	·	920 m	MPC · JPL
672846	2014 WE_{537}	—	November 29, 2014	Mount Lemmon	Mount Lemmon Survey	·	930 m	MPC · JPL
672847	2014 WA_{542}	—	November 26, 2014	Haleakala	Pan-STARRS 1	·	1.3 km	MPC · JPL
672848	2014 WD_{544}	—	October 14, 2009	Catalina	CSS	·	1.5 km	MPC · JPL
672849	2014 WN_{546}	—	November 26, 2014	Haleakala	Pan-STARRS 1	·	2.6 km	MPC · JPL
672850	2014 WA_{547}	—	November 20, 2014	Haleakala	Pan-STARRS 1	·	1.2 km	MPC · JPL
672851	2014 WV_{547}	—	November 27, 2014	Haleakala	Pan-STARRS 1	KON	1.5 km	MPC · JPL
672852	2014 WM_{548}	—	November 29, 2014	Mount Lemmon	Mount Lemmon Survey	EUN	790 m	MPC · JPL
672853	2014 WC_{549}	—	November 26, 2014	Haleakala	Pan-STARRS 1	·	840 m	MPC · JPL
672854	2014 WE_{550}	—	November 22, 2014	Haleakala	Pan-STARRS 1	(5)	720 m	MPC · JPL
672855	2014 WK_{551}	—	November 21, 2014	Haleakala	Pan-STARRS 1	·	960 m	MPC · JPL
672856	2014 WK_{552}	—	November 25, 2014	Haleakala	Pan-STARRS 1	·	1.3 km	MPC · JPL
672857	2014 WM_{552}	—	November 26, 2014	Mount Lemmon	Mount Lemmon Survey	EUN	1.1 km	MPC · JPL
672858	2014 WE_{553}	—	November 25, 2014	Mount Lemmon	Mount Lemmon Survey	·	890 m	MPC · JPL
672859	2014 WP_{560}	—	November 17, 2014	Haleakala	Pan-STARRS 1	·	1.3 km	MPC · JPL
672860	2014 WT_{561}	—	September 13, 2018	Mount Lemmon	Mount Lemmon Survey	·	1.1 km	MPC · JPL
672861	2014 WF_{564}	—	November 21, 2014	Haleakala	Pan-STARRS 1	·	1.1 km	MPC · JPL
672862	2014 WN_{564}	—	November 27, 2014	Haleakala	Pan-STARRS 1	·	910 m	MPC · JPL
672863	2014 WX_{564}	—	November 19, 2014	Haleakala	Pan-STARRS 1	JUN	950 m	MPC · JPL
672864	2014 WV_{565}	—	January 26, 2003	Palomar	NEAT	·	1.0 km	MPC · JPL
672865	2014 WP_{566}	—	November 21, 2014	Haleakala	Pan-STARRS 1	·	1.6 km	MPC · JPL
672866	2014 WY_{567}	—	November 22, 2014	Mount Lemmon	Mount Lemmon Survey	·	940 m	MPC · JPL
672867	2014 WG_{568}	—	November 21, 2014	Haleakala	Pan-STARRS 1	·	1.2 km	MPC · JPL
672868	2014 WV_{570}	—	November 26, 2014	Haleakala	Pan-STARRS 1	·	1.2 km	MPC · JPL
672869	2014 WO_{573}	—	November 27, 2014	Mount Lemmon	Mount Lemmon Survey	·	1.5 km	MPC · JPL
672870	2014 WT_{573}	—	November 18, 2014	Mount Lemmon	Mount Lemmon Survey	·	910 m	MPC · JPL
672871	2014 WM_{576}	—	November 16, 2014	Mount Lemmon	Mount Lemmon Survey	·	950 m	MPC · JPL
672872	2014 WC_{577}	—	September 27, 1997	Kitt Peak	Spacewatch	·	960 m	MPC · JPL
672873	2014 WN_{578}	—	November 17, 2014	Haleakala	Pan-STARRS 1	·	690 m	MPC · JPL
672874	2014 WQ_{579}	—	November 27, 2014	Haleakala	Pan-STARRS 1	·	970 m	MPC · JPL
672875	2014 WX_{579}	—	November 25, 2014	Haleakala	Pan-STARRS 1	·	3.6 km	MPC · JPL
672876	2014 WK_{591}	—	November 29, 2014	Mount Lemmon	Mount Lemmon Survey	·	1.0 km	MPC · JPL
672877	2014 WM_{592}	—	November 23, 2014	Mount Lemmon	Mount Lemmon Survey	·	890 m	MPC · JPL
672878	2014 WC_{601}	—	November 17, 2014	Haleakala	Pan-STARRS 1	·	870 m	MPC · JPL
672879	2014 WZ_{606}	—	November 25, 2014	Mount Lemmon	Mount Lemmon Survey	·	1.0 km	MPC · JPL
672880	2014 XE_{5}	—	November 24, 2014	Kitt Peak	Spacewatch	KON	1.7 km	MPC · JPL
672881	2014 XG_{8}	—	December 12, 2014	Haleakala	Pan-STARRS 1	AMO · APO +1km	1.0 km	MPC · JPL
672882	2014 XA_{9}	—	December 18, 2003	Kitt Peak	Spacewatch	·	2.9 km	MPC · JPL
672883	2014 XJ_{9}	—	July 16, 2013	Haleakala	Pan-STARRS 1	·	3.2 km	MPC · JPL
672884	2014 XU_{9}	—	October 12, 2010	Catalina	CSS	PHO	720 m	MPC · JPL
672885	2014 XO_{10}	—	August 31, 2014	Haleakala	Pan-STARRS 1	·	1.0 km	MPC · JPL
672886	2014 XR_{17}	—	January 10, 2007	Mount Lemmon	Mount Lemmon Survey	(5)	910 m	MPC · JPL
672887	2014 XS_{17}	—	September 20, 2006	Kitt Peak	Spacewatch	·	1.1 km	MPC · JPL
672888	2014 XA_{21}	—	November 6, 2010	Mount Lemmon	Mount Lemmon Survey	·	960 m	MPC · JPL
672889	2014 XD_{23}	—	November 26, 2014	Haleakala	Pan-STARRS 1	RAF	730 m	MPC · JPL
672890	2014 XM_{25}	—	October 17, 2010	Mount Lemmon	Mount Lemmon Survey	NYS	930 m	MPC · JPL
672891	2014 XV_{26}	—	October 30, 2014	Haleakala	Pan-STARRS 1	·	1.2 km	MPC · JPL
672892	2014 XA_{27}	—	November 11, 2010	Kitt Peak	Spacewatch	MAR	900 m	MPC · JPL
672893	2014 XJ_{28}	—	April 27, 2012	Haleakala	Pan-STARRS 1	·	1.1 km	MPC · JPL
672894	2014 XU_{30}	—	November 4, 2014	Mount Lemmon	Mount Lemmon Survey	EUN	1.2 km	MPC · JPL
672895	2014 XO_{31}	—	November 26, 2014	Haleakala	Pan-STARRS 1	·	1.3 km	MPC · JPL
672896	2014 XZ_{32}	—	December 13, 2010	Mount Lemmon	Mount Lemmon Survey	(5)	950 m	MPC · JPL
672897	2014 XP_{33}	—	December 10, 2010	Mount Lemmon	Mount Lemmon Survey	·	1.1 km	MPC · JPL
672898	2014 XV_{37}	—	February 28, 2008	Kitt Peak	Spacewatch	3:2 · SHU	4.7 km	MPC · JPL
672899	2014 XB_{40}	—	October 26, 2014	Haleakala	Pan-STARRS 1	H	430 m	MPC · JPL
672900	2014 XB_{41}	—	December 10, 2014	Mount Lemmon	Mount Lemmon Survey	H	540 m	MPC · JPL

== 672901–673000 ==
back to top

Designation			Discovery			Properties		Ref
Permanent	Provisional	Named after	Date	Site	Discoverer(s)	Category	Diam.	Ref
672901	2014 XK_{41}	—	December 12, 2014	Haleakala	Pan-STARRS 1	H	480 m	MPC · JPL
672902	2014 XB_{43}	—	September 7, 2013	Črni Vrh	Skvarč, J.	·	1.9 km	MPC · JPL
672903	2014 XX_{43}	—	December 14, 2010	Mount Lemmon	Mount Lemmon Survey	·	1.1 km	MPC · JPL
672904	2014 XX_{45}	—	October 24, 2014	Mount Lemmon	Mount Lemmon Survey	EUN	920 m	MPC · JPL
672905	2014 XP_{46}	—	December 15, 2014	Mount Lemmon	Mount Lemmon Survey	·	1.2 km	MPC · JPL
672906	2014 XV_{47}	—	December 1, 2014	Kitt Peak	Spacewatch	·	1.1 km	MPC · JPL
672907	2014 XF_{48}	—	November 20, 2014	Mount Lemmon	Mount Lemmon Survey	·	1.0 km	MPC · JPL
672908	2014 XM_{50}	—	December 3, 2014	Haleakala	Pan-STARRS 1	·	1.2 km	MPC · JPL
672909	2014 XP_{51}	—	December 13, 2014	Haleakala	Pan-STARRS 1	·	1.2 km	MPC · JPL
672910	2014 XY_{53}	—	December 11, 2014	Mount Lemmon	Mount Lemmon Survey	·	1.1 km	MPC · JPL
672911	2014 XV_{54}	—	December 11, 2014	Mount Lemmon	Mount Lemmon Survey	·	670 m	MPC · JPL
672912	2014 XO_{55}	—	December 2, 2014	Haleakala	Pan-STARRS 1	·	1.8 km	MPC · JPL
672913	2014 YY	—	December 20, 2014	Haleakala	Pan-STARRS 1	·	320 m	MPC · JPL
672914	2014 YG_{3}	—	November 29, 2014	Haleakala	Pan-STARRS 1	(1547)	1.1 km	MPC · JPL
672915	2014 YB_{4}	—	September 19, 2003	Anderson Mesa	LONEOS	(2076)	740 m	MPC · JPL
672916	2014 YG_{4}	—	May 10, 2003	Kitt Peak	Spacewatch	EUN	1.2 km	MPC · JPL
672917	2014 YD_{6}	—	August 26, 2005	Siding Spring	SSS	·	1.6 km	MPC · JPL
672918	2014 YX_{9}	—	November 17, 2014	Haleakala	Pan-STARRS 1	·	1.1 km	MPC · JPL
672919	2014 YM_{11}	—	December 8, 2010	Mount Lemmon	Mount Lemmon Survey	·	1.2 km	MPC · JPL
672920	2014 YU_{12}	—	September 10, 2010	Kitt Peak	Spacewatch	·	1.0 km	MPC · JPL
672921	2014 YW_{12}	—	March 13, 2012	Mount Lemmon	Mount Lemmon Survey	·	1.3 km	MPC · JPL
672922	2014 YX_{12}	—	January 10, 2007	Kitt Peak	Spacewatch	·	1.3 km	MPC · JPL
672923	2014 YS_{13}	—	January 30, 2003	Palomar	NEAT	·	1.1 km	MPC · JPL
672924	2014 YE_{17}	—	November 23, 2014	Mount Lemmon	Mount Lemmon Survey	ADE	1.3 km	MPC · JPL
672925	2014 YL_{17}	—	November 22, 1997	Kitt Peak	Spacewatch	(5)	1.0 km	MPC · JPL
672926	2014 YS_{18}	—	November 7, 2010	Mount Lemmon	Mount Lemmon Survey	HNS	1.2 km	MPC · JPL
672927	2014 YT_{22}	—	October 24, 2009	Kitt Peak	Spacewatch	·	1.3 km	MPC · JPL
672928	2014 YL_{24}	—	January 22, 2012	Haleakala	Pan-STARRS 1	·	990 m	MPC · JPL
672929	2014 YP_{24}	—	November 30, 2003	Kitt Peak	Spacewatch	·	810 m	MPC · JPL
672930	2014 YP_{25}	—	July 13, 2013	Haleakala	Pan-STARRS 1	·	1.6 km	MPC · JPL
672931	2014 YX_{25}	—	November 29, 2014	Mount Lemmon	Mount Lemmon Survey	·	1.1 km	MPC · JPL
672932	2014 YB_{30}	—	October 4, 2014	Haleakala	Pan-STARRS 1	·	1.7 km	MPC · JPL
672933	2014 YU_{30}	—	September 24, 2009	Mount Lemmon	Mount Lemmon Survey	·	1.6 km	MPC · JPL
672934	2014 YF_{31}	—	August 20, 2004	La Silla	S. F. Hönig, Duschl, W. J.	HNS	980 m	MPC · JPL
672935	2014 YL_{32}	—	December 1, 2014	Haleakala	Pan-STARRS 1	·	1.2 km	MPC · JPL
672936	2014 YP_{32}	—	December 26, 2014	Haleakala	Pan-STARRS 1	·	770 m	MPC · JPL
672937	2014 YG_{35}	—	December 20, 2009	Mount Lemmon	Mount Lemmon Survey	EOS	1.7 km	MPC · JPL
672938	2014 YC_{40}	—	December 2, 2010	Kitt Peak	Spacewatch	·	1.5 km	MPC · JPL
672939	2014 YM_{40}	—	October 8, 2001	Palomar	NEAT	·	690 m	MPC · JPL
672940	2014 YE_{41}	—	October 7, 2010	Catalina	CSS	·	1.2 km	MPC · JPL
672941	2014 YH_{41}	—	February 13, 2010	Catalina	CSS	H	420 m	MPC · JPL
672942	2014 YO_{41}	—	November 26, 2014	Haleakala	Pan-STARRS 1	·	1.5 km	MPC · JPL
672943	2014 YG_{42}	—	December 26, 2014	Haleakala	Pan-STARRS 1	·	1.1 km	MPC · JPL
672944	2014 YB_{45}	—	April 24, 2004	Kitt Peak	Spacewatch	·	2.1 km	MPC · JPL
672945	2014 YF_{47}	—	November 9, 2009	Socorro	LINEAR	·	2.0 km	MPC · JPL
672946	2014 YC_{48}	—	July 31, 2014	Haleakala	Pan-STARRS 1	·	1.1 km	MPC · JPL
672947	2014 YD_{50}	—	December 18, 2014	Haleakala	Pan-STARRS 1	SDO	182 km	MPC · JPL
672948	2014 YV_{53}	—	February 8, 2002	Kitt Peak	Spacewatch	·	1.2 km	MPC · JPL
672949	2014 YZ_{53}	—	December 25, 2014	Haleakala	Pan-STARRS 1	EUN	940 m	MPC · JPL
672950	2014 YL_{54}	—	January 23, 2011	Mount Lemmon	Mount Lemmon Survey	·	1.2 km	MPC · JPL
672951	2014 YT_{54}	—	August 24, 2007	Kitt Peak	Spacewatch	·	3.2 km	MPC · JPL
672952	2014 YW_{57}	—	October 27, 2005	Kitt Peak	Spacewatch	JUN	660 m	MPC · JPL
672953	2014 YJ_{59}	—	December 21, 2014	Mount Lemmon	Mount Lemmon Survey	·	1.4 km	MPC · JPL
672954	2014 YQ_{59}	—	December 21, 2014	Mount Lemmon	Mount Lemmon Survey	·	1.2 km	MPC · JPL
672955	2014 YK_{62}	—	December 29, 2014	Haleakala	Pan-STARRS 1	·	1.6 km	MPC · JPL
672956	2014 YB_{63}	—	December 29, 2014	Haleakala	Pan-STARRS 1	·	1.9 km	MPC · JPL
672957	2014 YU_{67}	—	December 21, 2014	Haleakala	Pan-STARRS 1	·	1.2 km	MPC · JPL
672958	2014 YV_{68}	—	December 26, 2014	Haleakala	Pan-STARRS 1	(5)	890 m	MPC · JPL
672959	2014 YB_{69}	—	December 26, 2014	Haleakala	Pan-STARRS 1	·	1.7 km	MPC · JPL
672960	2014 YH_{70}	—	December 21, 2014	Haleakala	Pan-STARRS 1	·	1.1 km	MPC · JPL
672961	2014 YD_{72}	—	December 29, 2014	Haleakala	Pan-STARRS 1	·	1.7 km	MPC · JPL
672962	2014 YV_{76}	—	December 21, 2014	Haleakala	Pan-STARRS 1	·	970 m	MPC · JPL
672963	2014 YK_{77}	—	December 23, 2014	Mount Lemmon	Mount Lemmon Survey	·	970 m	MPC · JPL
672964	2014 YL_{77}	—	December 26, 2014	Haleakala	Pan-STARRS 1	JUN	930 m	MPC · JPL
672965	2014 YS_{77}	—	December 24, 2014	Mount Lemmon	Mount Lemmon Survey	·	1.4 km	MPC · JPL
672966	2014 YA_{78}	—	December 29, 2014	Haleakala	Pan-STARRS 1	·	1.3 km	MPC · JPL
672967	2014 YJ_{78}	—	December 27, 2014	Haleakala	Pan-STARRS 1	·	2.2 km	MPC · JPL
672968	2014 YW_{78}	—	December 29, 2014	Haleakala	Pan-STARRS 1	·	1.6 km	MPC · JPL
672969	2014 YX_{78}	—	December 29, 2014	Haleakala	Pan-STARRS 1	·	1.9 km	MPC · JPL
672970	2014 YA_{79}	—	December 21, 2014	Haleakala	Pan-STARRS 1	·	910 m	MPC · JPL
672971	2014 YB_{90}	—	December 21, 2014	Haleakala	Pan-STARRS 1	·	1.5 km	MPC · JPL
672972	2014 YO_{95}	—	December 17, 2014	Haleakala	Pan-STARRS 1	MAR	850 m	MPC · JPL
672973	2015 AZ	—	September 4, 2014	Haleakala	Pan-STARRS 1	·	960 m	MPC · JPL
672974	2015 AC_{5}	—	February 26, 2007	Mount Lemmon	Mount Lemmon Survey	(1547)	1.1 km	MPC · JPL
672975	2015 AS_{5}	—	November 16, 2014	Haleakala	Pan-STARRS 1	·	900 m	MPC · JPL
672976	2015 AX_{6}	—	September 25, 2009	Kitt Peak	Spacewatch	EUN	860 m	MPC · JPL
672977	2015 AB_{7}	—	October 4, 2014	Haleakala	Pan-STARRS 1	·	1.1 km	MPC · JPL
672978	2015 AF_{9}	—	September 3, 2013	Kitt Peak	Spacewatch	·	1.6 km	MPC · JPL
672979	2015 AT_{10}	—	December 27, 2014	Haleakala	Pan-STARRS 1	·	980 m	MPC · JPL
672980	2015 AS_{11}	—	October 12, 2013	Mount Lemmon	Mount Lemmon Survey	·	1.8 km	MPC · JPL
672981	2015 AX_{12}	—	April 4, 2011	Mount Lemmon	Mount Lemmon Survey	·	1.5 km	MPC · JPL
672982	2015 AA_{13}	—	September 4, 2007	Catalina	CSS	·	3.2 km	MPC · JPL
672983	2015 AC_{13}	—	November 21, 2014	Haleakala	Pan-STARRS 1	·	2.4 km	MPC · JPL
672984	2015 AQ_{15}	—	September 15, 2009	Kitt Peak	Spacewatch	·	1.4 km	MPC · JPL
672985	2015 AV_{15}	—	April 1, 2005	Anderson Mesa	LONEOS	·	2.4 km	MPC · JPL
672986	2015 AX_{15}	—	January 11, 2015	Haleakala	Pan-STARRS 1	JUN	770 m	MPC · JPL
672987	2015 AN_{16}	—	November 21, 2014	Haleakala	Pan-STARRS 1	·	1.2 km	MPC · JPL
672988	2015 AS_{16}	—	December 30, 2005	Catalina	CSS	·	1.5 km	MPC · JPL
672989	2015 AZ_{18}	—	October 26, 2014	Haleakala	Pan-STARRS 1	·	750 m	MPC · JPL
672990	2015 AP_{19}	—	December 3, 2010	Kitt Peak	Spacewatch	·	1.2 km	MPC · JPL
672991	2015 AE_{20}	—	October 24, 2014	Mount Lemmon	Mount Lemmon Survey	HNS	960 m	MPC · JPL
672992	2015 AX_{22}	—	January 11, 2008	Mount Lemmon	Mount Lemmon Survey	·	1.5 km	MPC · JPL
672993	2015 AX_{23}	—	January 12, 2015	Haleakala	Pan-STARRS 1	·	1.1 km	MPC · JPL
672994	2015 AT_{24}	—	January 19, 2012	Haleakala	Pan-STARRS 1	PHO	860 m	MPC · JPL
672995	2015 AW_{24}	—	August 31, 2014	Haleakala	Pan-STARRS 1	·	1.1 km	MPC · JPL
672996	2015 AL_{25}	—	November 23, 2014	Haleakala	Pan-STARRS 1	HNS	890 m	MPC · JPL
672997	2015 AF_{30}	—	March 10, 2008	Mount Lemmon	Mount Lemmon Survey	·	1.1 km	MPC · JPL
672998	2015 AA_{32}	—	July 22, 1995	Kitt Peak	Spacewatch	·	1.5 km	MPC · JPL
672999	2015 AF_{33}	—	November 3, 2010	Mayhill-ISON	L. Elenin	·	890 m	MPC · JPL
673000	2015 AS_{34}	—	December 21, 2014	Haleakala	Pan-STARRS 1	·	650 m	MPC · JPL

back to top
