= List of minor planets: 842001–843000 =

The following is a partial list of minor planets, running from minor-planet number 842001 through 843000, inclusive. The primary data for this and other partial lists is based on JPL's "Small-Body Orbital Elements" and data available from the Minor Planet Center. Critical list information is also provided by the MPC, unless otherwise specified from Lowell Observatory. A detailed description of the table's columns and additional sources are given on the main page including a complete list of every page in this series, and a statistical break-up on the dynamical classification of minor planets.

Also see the summary list of all named bodies in numerical and alphabetical order, and the corresponding naming citations for the number range of this particular list. New namings may only be added to this list after official publication, as the preannouncement of names is condemned by the Working Group for Small Bodies Nomenclature of the International Astronomical Union.

Near-Earth obj.	MBA (inner)	MBA (outer)	Centaur
Mars-crosser	MBA (middle)	Jupiter trojan	Trans-Neptunian obj.
Unclassified

== 842001–842100 ==
Designation			Discovery			Properties		Ref
Permanent	Provisional	Named after	Date	Site	Discoverer(s)	Category	Diam.	Ref
842001	2015 RW_{317}	—	September 9, 2015	Haleakala	Pan-STARRS 1	·	1.5 km	MPC · JPL
842002	2015 RE_{318}	—	September 6, 2015	Kitt Peak	Spacewatch	·	1.6 km	MPC · JPL
842003	2015 RV_{318}	—	September 8, 2015	Haleakala	Pan-STARRS 1	·	1.3 km	MPC · JPL
842004	2015 RU_{320}	—	September 12, 2015	Haleakala	Pan-STARRS 1	·	1.5 km	MPC · JPL
842005	2015 RS_{322}	—	September 11, 2015	Haleakala	Pan-STARRS 1	HOF	1.7 km	MPC · JPL
842006	2015 RR_{323}	—	September 11, 2015	Haleakala	Pan-STARRS 1	·	1.3 km	MPC · JPL
842007	2015 RH_{336}	—	September 9, 2015	Haleakala	Pan-STARRS 1	KOR	940 m	MPC · JPL
842008	2015 RX_{338}	—	September 8, 2015	XuYi	PMO NEO Survey Program	H	310 m	MPC · JPL
842009	2015 RO_{339}	—	September 11, 2015	Haleakala	Pan-STARRS 1	·	1.8 km	MPC · JPL
842010	2015 RZ_{342}	—	September 9, 2015	Haleakala	Pan-STARRS 1	·	2.0 km	MPC · JPL
842011	2015 RM_{346}	—	September 9, 2015	Haleakala	Pan-STARRS 1	·	1.6 km	MPC · JPL
842012	2015 RT_{346}	—	September 1, 2015	Cerro Tololo	DECam	·	750 m	MPC · JPL
842013	2015 RW_{346}	—	September 6, 2008	Kitt Peak	Spacewatch	·	530 m	MPC · JPL
842014	2015 RY_{347}	—	September 12, 2015	Haleakala	Pan-STARRS 1	·	2.2 km	MPC · JPL
842015	2015 RL_{349}	—	September 9, 2015	Haleakala	Pan-STARRS 1	·	1.9 km	MPC · JPL
842016	2015 RR_{357}	—	September 9, 2015	Haleakala	Pan-STARRS 1	·	690 m	MPC · JPL
842017	2015 RJ_{358}	—	September 9, 2015	Haleakala	Pan-STARRS 1	EOS	1.0 km	MPC · JPL
842018	2015 RC_{362}	—	September 12, 2015	Haleakala	Pan-STARRS 1	MAR	540 m	MPC · JPL
842019	2015 RC_{376}	—	September 9, 2015	Haleakala	Pan-STARRS 1	EOS	1.3 km	MPC · JPL
842020	2015 RA_{379}	—	September 4, 2015	Kitt Peak	Spacewatch	·	850 m	MPC · JPL
842021	2015 RG_{381}	—	February 27, 2012	Haleakala	Pan-STARRS 1	·	1.8 km	MPC · JPL
842022	2015 RA_{383}	—	September 9, 2015	Haleakala	Pan-STARRS 1	·	1.8 km	MPC · JPL
842023	2015 SO_{4}	—	June 4, 2006	Mount Lemmon	Mount Lemmon Survey	·	1.2 km	MPC · JPL
842024	2015 SB_{10}	—	January 12, 2010	WISE	WISE	·	3.9 km	MPC · JPL
842025	2015 SG_{11}	—	July 27, 2010	WISE	WISE	·	1.8 km	MPC · JPL
842026	2015 SC_{13}	—	July 30, 2015	Haleakala	Pan-STARRS 1	·	2.9 km	MPC · JPL
842027	2015 SP_{17}	—	July 12, 2010	WISE	WISE	·	1.4 km	MPC · JPL
842028	2015 SW_{21}	—	September 23, 2015	Haleakala	Pan-STARRS 1	H	390 m	MPC · JPL
842029	2015 SY_{21}	—	September 22, 2015	Haleakala	Pan-STARRS 1	H	420 m	MPC · JPL
842030	2015 SJ_{22}	—	December 8, 2010	Mount Lemmon	Mount Lemmon Survey	H	420 m	MPC · JPL
842031	2015 SW_{22}	—	June 20, 2010	WISE	WISE	·	1.7 km	MPC · JPL
842032	2015 SM_{24}	—	September 5, 2010	Mount Lemmon	Mount Lemmon Survey	·	1.4 km	MPC · JPL
842033	2015 SR_{26}	—	February 8, 2011	Mount Lemmon	Mount Lemmon Survey	·	1.9 km	MPC · JPL
842034	2015 SJ_{27}	—	November 5, 2005	Kitt Peak	Spacewatch	EOS	1.4 km	MPC · JPL
842035	2015 SH_{29}	—	October 24, 2011	Haleakala	Pan-STARRS 1	·	1.3 km	MPC · JPL
842036	2015 SX_{29}	—	November 2, 2010	Mount Lemmon	Mount Lemmon Survey	·	1.6 km	MPC · JPL
842037	2015 SW_{30}	—	September 23, 2015	Haleakala	Pan-STARRS 1	·	2.0 km	MPC · JPL
842038	2015 SZ_{30}	—	September 23, 2015	Haleakala	Pan-STARRS 1	·	950 m	MPC · JPL
842039	2015 SY_{32}	—	September 23, 2015	Haleakala	Pan-STARRS 1	GAL	860 m	MPC · JPL
842040	2015 SE_{33}	—	September 25, 2015	Mount Lemmon	Mount Lemmon Survey	·	550 m	MPC · JPL
842041	2015 SK_{37}	—	September 23, 2015	Haleakala	Pan-STARRS 1	·	550 m	MPC · JPL
842042	2015 ST_{37}	—	April 3, 2017	Haleakala	Pan-STARRS 1	(2076)	510 m	MPC · JPL
842043	2015 SG_{39}	—	September 23, 2015	Haleakala	Pan-STARRS 1	·	790 m	MPC · JPL
842044	2015 SL_{40}	—	February 23, 2007	Mount Lemmon	Mount Lemmon Survey	EOS	1.3 km	MPC · JPL
842045	2015 ST_{40}	—	September 23, 2015	Haleakala	Pan-STARRS 1	·	1.5 km	MPC · JPL
842046	2015 SV_{40}	—	September 18, 2015	Mount Lemmon	Mount Lemmon Survey	·	1.4 km	MPC · JPL
842047	2015 SD_{42}	—	September 23, 2015	Haleakala	Pan-STARRS 1	EOS	1.3 km	MPC · JPL
842048	2015 SF_{42}	—	September 23, 2015	Mount Lemmon	Mount Lemmon Survey	·	1.8 km	MPC · JPL
842049	2015 SS_{42}	—	September 23, 2015	Haleakala	Pan-STARRS 1	·	1.4 km	MPC · JPL
842050	2015 SC_{44}	—	September 23, 2015	Haleakala	Pan-STARRS 1	·	1.5 km	MPC · JPL
842051	2015 ST_{45}	—	September 24, 2015	Mount Lemmon	Mount Lemmon Survey	·	1.8 km	MPC · JPL
842052	2015 SY_{45}	—	September 23, 2015	Mount Lemmon	Mount Lemmon Survey	EUN	740 m	MPC · JPL
842053	2015 SE_{47}	—	September 23, 2015	Haleakala	Pan-STARRS 1	·	1.6 km	MPC · JPL
842054	2015 SM_{47}	—	September 23, 2015	Mount Lemmon	Mount Lemmon Survey	PAD	970 m	MPC · JPL
842055	2015 SN_{48}	—	September 20, 2015	Mount Lemmon	Mount Lemmon Survey	·	490 m	MPC · JPL
842056	2015 SV_{48}	—	August 23, 2004	Kitt Peak	Spacewatch	H	400 m	MPC · JPL
842057	2015 SO_{49}	—	September 23, 2015	Haleakala	Pan-STARRS 1	·	980 m	MPC · JPL
842058	2015 SV_{50}	—	September 18, 2015	Mount Lemmon	Mount Lemmon Survey	·	1.7 km	MPC · JPL
842059	2015 TM	—	September 30, 2010	Mount Lemmon	Mount Lemmon Survey	H	410 m	MPC · JPL
842060	2015 TF_{3}	—	April 10, 2010	WISE	WISE	·	2.8 km	MPC · JPL
842061	2015 TE_{6}	—	July 29, 2010	WISE	WISE	·	3.5 km	MPC · JPL
842062	2015 TO_{12}	—	August 21, 2015	Haleakala	Pan-STARRS 1	·	1.7 km	MPC · JPL
842063	2015 TS_{13}	—	August 25, 2004	Kitt Peak	Spacewatch	·	2.2 km	MPC · JPL
842064	2015 TJ_{14}	—	July 25, 2015	Haleakala	Pan-STARRS 1	·	580 m	MPC · JPL
842065	2015 TQ_{14}	—	July 25, 2015	Haleakala	Pan-STARRS 1	·	540 m	MPC · JPL
842066	2015 TU_{14}	—	September 4, 2011	Haleakala	Pan-STARRS 1	RAF	680 m	MPC · JPL
842067	2015 TK_{20}	—	September 12, 2015	Haleakala	Pan-STARRS 1	·	500 m	MPC · JPL
842068	2015 TQ_{24}	—	May 16, 2012	Mount Lemmon	Mount Lemmon Survey	H	350 m	MPC · JPL
842069	2015 TG_{27}	—	September 11, 2007	Kitt Peak	Spacewatch	·	870 m	MPC · JPL
842070	2015 TL_{27}	—	December 2, 2000	Mauna Kea	Bedient, J.	·	900 m	MPC · JPL
842071	2015 TZ_{27}	—	July 25, 2015	Haleakala	Pan-STARRS 1	H	340 m	MPC · JPL
842072	2015 TA_{28}	—	July 24, 2015	Haleakala	Pan-STARRS 1	·	1.2 km	MPC · JPL
842073	2015 TL_{28}	—	May 11, 2010	Mount Lemmon	Mount Lemmon Survey	·	1.1 km	MPC · JPL
842074	2015 TU_{30}	—	September 30, 2006	Mount Lemmon	Mount Lemmon Survey	·	1.5 km	MPC · JPL
842075	2015 TK_{31}	—	October 10, 2002	Sacramento Peak	SDSS	·	1.2 km	MPC · JPL
842076	2015 TK_{32}	—	August 14, 2015	Haleakala	Pan-STARRS 1	·	550 m	MPC · JPL
842077	2015 TR_{33}	—	August 21, 2015	Haleakala	Pan-STARRS 1	·	1.5 km	MPC · JPL
842078	2015 TJ_{34}	—	August 14, 2015	Haleakala	Pan-STARRS 1	·	1.8 km	MPC · JPL
842079	2015 TZ_{37}	—	July 6, 2005	Kitt Peak	Spacewatch	·	1.8 km	MPC · JPL
842080	2015 TW_{38}	—	January 10, 2008	Mount Lemmon	Mount Lemmon Survey	·	1.3 km	MPC · JPL
842081	2015 TY_{40}	—	January 26, 2012	Mount Lemmon	Mount Lemmon Survey	EOS	1.3 km	MPC · JPL
842082	2015 TG_{41}	—	July 19, 2015	Haleakala	Pan-STARRS 1	EOS	1.3 km	MPC · JPL
842083	2015 TH_{43}	—	May 28, 2014	Haleakala	Pan-STARRS 1	·	1.5 km	MPC · JPL
842084	2015 TO_{43}	—	October 30, 2011	Mount Lemmon	Mount Lemmon Survey	NEM	1.7 km	MPC · JPL
842085	2015 TN_{44}	—	October 1, 2006	Kitt Peak	Spacewatch	·	1.3 km	MPC · JPL
842086	2015 TP_{44}	—	October 30, 2010	Mount Lemmon	Mount Lemmon Survey	·	2.5 km	MPC · JPL
842087	2015 TQ_{49}	—	July 25, 2015	Haleakala	Pan-STARRS 1	·	1.4 km	MPC · JPL
842088	2015 TT_{49}	—	July 25, 2015	Haleakala	Pan-STARRS 1	·	820 m	MPC · JPL
842089	2015 TW_{51}	—	September 18, 2010	Mount Lemmon	Mount Lemmon Survey	·	1.3 km	MPC · JPL
842090	2015 TM_{53}	—	September 23, 2015	Haleakala	Pan-STARRS 1	·	2.4 km	MPC · JPL
842091	2015 TB_{54}	—	July 23, 2015	Haleakala	Pan-STARRS 1	·	1.5 km	MPC · JPL
842092	2015 TF_{55}	—	September 23, 2015	Mount Lemmon	Mount Lemmon Survey	·	1.5 km	MPC · JPL
842093	2015 TJ_{55}	—	June 22, 2010	WISE	WISE	NAE	1.8 km	MPC · JPL
842094	2015 TQ_{55}	—	December 6, 2012	Mount Lemmon	Mount Lemmon Survey	·	430 m	MPC · JPL
842095	2015 TV_{55}	—	September 11, 2015	Haleakala	Pan-STARRS 1	·	1.1 km	MPC · JPL
842096	2015 TZ_{55}	—	February 15, 2013	Haleakala	Pan-STARRS 1	·	1.6 km	MPC · JPL
842097	2015 TT_{56}	—	September 15, 2010	Mount Lemmon	Mount Lemmon Survey	·	1.8 km	MPC · JPL
842098	2015 TA_{61}	—	October 11, 2010	Mount Lemmon	Mount Lemmon Survey	·	1.5 km	MPC · JPL
842099	2015 TJ_{62}	—	October 15, 2004	Mount Lemmon	Mount Lemmon Survey	·	2.1 km	MPC · JPL
842100	2015 TQ_{65}	—	October 8, 2015	Haleakala	Pan-STARRS 1	·	1.8 km	MPC · JPL

== 842101–842200 ==
back to top

Designation			Discovery			Properties		Ref
Permanent	Provisional	Named after	Date	Site	Discoverer(s)	Category	Diam.	Ref
842101	2015 TD_{66}	—	April 30, 2014	Haleakala	Pan-STARRS 1	·	830 m	MPC · JPL
842102	2015 TX_{70}	—	September 9, 2015	Haleakala	Pan-STARRS 1	·	2.3 km	MPC · JPL
842103	2015 TE_{72}	—	October 8, 2015	Haleakala	Pan-STARRS 1	·	1.5 km	MPC · JPL
842104	2015 TL_{72}	—	October 8, 2015	Haleakala	Pan-STARRS 1	·	740 m	MPC · JPL
842105	2015 TX_{73}	—	September 9, 2015	Haleakala	Pan-STARRS 1	·	1.5 km	MPC · JPL
842106	2015 TF_{79}	—	September 17, 2009	Kitt Peak	Spacewatch	EOS	1.5 km	MPC · JPL
842107	2015 TA_{81}	—	January 13, 2010	WISE	WISE	(69559)	2.4 km	MPC · JPL
842108	2015 TL_{82}	—	June 24, 2014	Haleakala	Pan-STARRS 1	·	2.4 km	MPC · JPL
842109	2015 TY_{82}	—	October 8, 2015	Haleakala	Pan-STARRS 1	·	440 m	MPC · JPL
842110	2015 TH_{87}	—	October 8, 2015	Haleakala	Pan-STARRS 1	TIR	2.1 km	MPC · JPL
842111	2015 TT_{87}	—	October 8, 2015	Haleakala	Pan-STARRS 1	·	1.4 km	MPC · JPL
842112	2015 TH_{89}	—	September 9, 2015	Haleakala	Pan-STARRS 1	·	2.2 km	MPC · JPL
842113	2015 TG_{93}	—	August 14, 2006	Palomar	NEAT	·	940 m	MPC · JPL
842114	2015 TY_{93}	—	October 8, 2015	Haleakala	Pan-STARRS 1	·	500 m	MPC · JPL
842115	2015 TO_{94}	—	December 4, 2010	Mount Lemmon	Mount Lemmon Survey	EOS	1.4 km	MPC · JPL
842116	2015 TT_{94}	—	March 24, 2012	Mount Lemmon	Mount Lemmon Survey	TIR	2.4 km	MPC · JPL
842117	2015 TT_{95}	—	July 24, 2009	Cerro Burek	I. de la Cueva	·	1.4 km	MPC · JPL
842118	2015 TN_{104}	—	October 8, 2015	Haleakala	Pan-STARRS 1	H	390 m	MPC · JPL
842119	2015 TY_{105}	—	July 22, 2010	WISE	WISE	·	2.5 km	MPC · JPL
842120	2015 TL_{106}	—	October 10, 2010	Kitt Peak	Spacewatch	·	1.4 km	MPC · JPL
842121	2015 TW_{106}	—	October 8, 2015	Haleakala	Pan-STARRS 1	·	1.3 km	MPC · JPL
842122	2015 TF_{112}	—	December 31, 2011	Mount Lemmon	Mount Lemmon Survey	·	1.0 km	MPC · JPL
842123	2015 TH_{113}	—	October 8, 2015	Haleakala	Pan-STARRS 1	·	1.4 km	MPC · JPL
842124	2015 TQ_{113}	—	May 19, 2010	WISE	WISE	·	1.9 km	MPC · JPL
842125	2015 TE_{114}	—	October 10, 2002	Sacramento Peak	SDSS	·	1.1 km	MPC · JPL
842126	2015 TR_{114}	—	October 8, 2015	Haleakala	Pan-STARRS 1	·	640 m	MPC · JPL
842127	2015 TG_{115}	—	January 10, 2013	Haleakala	Pan-STARRS 1	·	520 m	MPC · JPL
842128	2015 TA_{118}	—	July 30, 2014	Haleakala	Pan-STARRS 1	·	2.4 km	MPC · JPL
842129	2015 TP_{118}	—	July 15, 2010	WISE	WISE	·	1.4 km	MPC · JPL
842130	2015 TR_{118}	—	August 18, 2009	Kitt Peak	Spacewatch	·	1.9 km	MPC · JPL
842131	2015 TG_{119}	—	October 8, 2015	Haleakala	Pan-STARRS 1	TIR	1.7 km	MPC · JPL
842132	2015 TD_{121}	—	October 8, 2015	Haleakala	Pan-STARRS 1	·	2.3 km	MPC · JPL
842133	2015 TG_{123}	—	October 8, 2015	Haleakala	Pan-STARRS 1	·	470 m	MPC · JPL
842134	2015 TT_{123}	—	April 5, 2014	Haleakala	Pan-STARRS 1	·	520 m	MPC · JPL
842135	2015 TH_{125}	—	May 9, 2014	Haleakala	Pan-STARRS 1	TIN	710 m	MPC · JPL
842136	2015 TJ_{126}	—	October 8, 2015	Haleakala	Pan-STARRS 1	EOS	1.4 km	MPC · JPL
842137	2015 TE_{128}	—	October 8, 2015	Haleakala	Pan-STARRS 1	·	860 m	MPC · JPL
842138	2015 TV_{128}	—	October 8, 2015	Haleakala	Pan-STARRS 1	·	1.8 km	MPC · JPL
842139	2015 TY_{129}	—	April 30, 2014	Haleakala	Pan-STARRS 1	·	880 m	MPC · JPL
842140	2015 TJ_{130}	—	December 10, 2010	Mount Lemmon	Mount Lemmon Survey	·	1.4 km	MPC · JPL
842141	2015 TX_{130}	—	November 8, 2010	Kitt Peak	Spacewatch	·	1.8 km	MPC · JPL
842142	2015 TL_{131}	—	October 8, 2015	Haleakala	Pan-STARRS 1	·	1.7 km	MPC · JPL
842143	2015 TO_{131}	—	October 8, 2015	Haleakala	Pan-STARRS 1	·	2.1 km	MPC · JPL
842144	2015 TU_{132}	—	October 8, 2015	Haleakala	Pan-STARRS 1	·	1.5 km	MPC · JPL
842145	2015 TW_{134}	—	June 25, 2014	Mount Lemmon	Mount Lemmon Survey	·	2.1 km	MPC · JPL
842146	2015 TJ_{137}	—	November 10, 2005	Kitt Peak	Spacewatch	·	1.3 km	MPC · JPL
842147	2015 TR_{138}	—	January 3, 2011	Mount Lemmon	Mount Lemmon Survey	VER	1.9 km	MPC · JPL
842148	2015 TL_{140}	—	January 31, 2008	Mount Lemmon	Mount Lemmon Survey	·	1.2 km	MPC · JPL
842149	2015 TH_{142}	—	January 10, 2013	Haleakala	Pan-STARRS 1	V	390 m	MPC · JPL
842150	2015 TJ_{143}	—	September 11, 2015	Haleakala	Pan-STARRS 1	GEF	920 m	MPC · JPL
842151	2015 TR_{144}	—	June 12, 2010	WISE	WISE	·	1.4 km	MPC · JPL
842152	2015 TJ_{148}	—	November 17, 2006	Kitt Peak	Spacewatch	MRX	700 m	MPC · JPL
842153	2015 TH_{152}	—	October 8, 2015	Mount Lemmon	Mount Lemmon Survey	DOR	1.8 km	MPC · JPL
842154	2015 TC_{153}	—	March 19, 2013	Haleakala	Pan-STARRS 1	·	1.4 km	MPC · JPL
842155	2015 TR_{153}	—	September 11, 2015	Haleakala	Pan-STARRS 1	·	450 m	MPC · JPL
842156	2015 TH_{155}	—	January 5, 2013	Mount Lemmon	Mount Lemmon Survey	·	400 m	MPC · JPL
842157	2015 TR_{155}	—	September 10, 2015	Haleakala	Pan-STARRS 1	·	1.5 km	MPC · JPL
842158	2015 TT_{155}	—	November 12, 2005	Kitt Peak	Spacewatch	·	350 m	MPC · JPL
842159	2015 TZ_{155}	—	September 12, 2015	Haleakala	Pan-STARRS 1	·	1.9 km	MPC · JPL
842160	2015 TD_{158}	—	April 10, 2013	Haleakala	Pan-STARRS 1	EOS	1.2 km	MPC · JPL
842161	2015 TL_{158}	—	January 16, 2013	Mount Lemmon	Mount Lemmon Survey	·	420 m	MPC · JPL
842162	2015 TR_{161}	—	July 19, 2010	WISE	WISE	·	1.7 km	MPC · JPL
842163	2015 TC_{164}	—	October 25, 2012	Kitt Peak	Spacewatch	·	510 m	MPC · JPL
842164	2015 TT_{165}	—	September 16, 2015	XuYi	PMO NEO Survey Program	·	2.3 km	MPC · JPL
842165	2015 TY_{165}	—	October 9, 2015	Kitt Peak	Spacewatch	·	2.2 km	MPC · JPL
842166	2015 TC_{166}	—	September 9, 2015	Haleakala	Pan-STARRS 1	EMA	2.2 km	MPC · JPL
842167	2015 TU_{166}	—	February 28, 2014	Haleakala	Pan-STARRS 1	H	380 m	MPC · JPL
842168	2015 TW_{166}	—	April 17, 2001	Sacramento Peak	SDSS	H	490 m	MPC · JPL
842169	2015 TY_{169}	—	November 8, 2010	Mount Lemmon	Mount Lemmon Survey	·	1.4 km	MPC · JPL
842170	2015 TZ_{169}	—	April 10, 2013	Haleakala	Pan-STARRS 1	·	1.4 km	MPC · JPL
842171	2015 TM_{174}	—	December 6, 2010	Mount Lemmon	Mount Lemmon Survey	·	1.2 km	MPC · JPL
842172	2015 TE_{175}	—	October 9, 2015	Haleakala	Pan-STARRS 1	·	590 m	MPC · JPL
842173	2015 TS_{182}	—	July 16, 2004	Cerro Tololo	Deep Ecliptic Survey	·	2.3 km	MPC · JPL
842174	2015 TU_{182}	—	August 18, 2015	Kitt Peak	Spacewatch	·	1.8 km	MPC · JPL
842175	2015 TA_{192}	—	August 9, 2015	Haleakala	Pan-STARRS 1	·	520 m	MPC · JPL
842176	2015 TQ_{192}	—	July 26, 2011	Haleakala	Pan-STARRS 1	·	910 m	MPC · JPL
842177	2015 TC_{193}	—	July 23, 2015	Haleakala	Pan-STARRS 1	·	730 m	MPC · JPL
842178	2015 TR_{194}	—	November 4, 2010	Mount Lemmon	Mount Lemmon Survey	·	1.5 km	MPC · JPL
842179	2015 TK_{197}	—	July 25, 2015	Haleakala	Pan-STARRS 1	·	2.0 km	MPC · JPL
842180	2015 TB_{200}	—	September 6, 2004	Ottmarsheim	C. Rinner	·	850 m	MPC · JPL
842181	2015 TY_{204}	—	October 10, 2015	Haleakala	Pan-STARRS 1	·	1.8 km	MPC · JPL
842182	2015 TY_{206}	—	September 12, 2015	Haleakala	Pan-STARRS 1	·	1.8 km	MPC · JPL
842183	2015 TJ_{208}	—	August 19, 2006	Anderson Mesa	LONEOS	·	1.4 km	MPC · JPL
842184	2015 TM_{208}	—	September 24, 2015	Mount Lemmon	Mount Lemmon Survey	H	340 m	MPC · JPL
842185	2015 TY_{209}	—	September 28, 2001	Palomar	NEAT	·	2.9 km	MPC · JPL
842186	2015 TY_{213}	—	July 20, 2010	WISE	WISE	·	1.1 km	MPC · JPL
842187	2015 TZ_{216}	—	January 20, 2012	Haleakala	Pan-STARRS 1	·	1.5 km	MPC · JPL
842188	2015 TY_{217}	—	November 1, 2010	Mount Lemmon	Mount Lemmon Survey	·	1.1 km	MPC · JPL
842189	2015 TP_{220}	—	September 27, 2010	Kitt Peak	Spacewatch	KOR	1.0 km	MPC · JPL
842190	2015 TR_{221}	—	September 24, 2008	Kitt Peak	Spacewatch	·	360 m	MPC · JPL
842191	2015 TQ_{231}	—	September 26, 2006	Mount Lemmon	Mount Lemmon Survey	·	930 m	MPC · JPL
842192	2015 TH_{232}	—	March 12, 2007	Kitt Peak	Spacewatch	·	1.5 km	MPC · JPL
842193	2015 TZ_{233}	—	November 18, 2004	Campo Imperatore	CINEOS	THB	2.3 km	MPC · JPL
842194	2015 TZ_{240}	—	September 9, 2015	Haleakala	Pan-STARRS 1	H	270 m	MPC · JPL
842195	2015 TJ_{241}	—	October 9, 2004	Kitt Peak	Spacewatch	THB	2.1 km	MPC · JPL
842196	2015 TK_{242}	—	June 17, 2010	WISE	WISE	·	2.0 km	MPC · JPL
842197	2015 TW_{242}	—	September 5, 1994	Kitt Peak	Spacewatch	·	1.4 km	MPC · JPL
842198	2015 TD_{246}	—	October 30, 2010	Mount Lemmon	Mount Lemmon Survey	·	1.9 km	MPC · JPL
842199	2015 TB_{248}	—	December 19, 2007	Mount Lemmon	Mount Lemmon Survey	·	1.2 km	MPC · JPL
842200	2015 TF_{248}	—	November 6, 2005	Mount Lemmon	Mount Lemmon Survey	·	1.5 km	MPC · JPL

== 842201–842300 ==
back to top

Designation			Discovery			Properties		Ref
Permanent	Provisional	Named after	Date	Site	Discoverer(s)	Category	Diam.	Ref
842201	2015 TJ_{249}	—	October 27, 2005	Kitt Peak	Spacewatch	·	1.4 km	MPC · JPL
842202	2015 TK_{250}	—	October 27, 2008	Mount Lemmon	Mount Lemmon Survey	MAS	470 m	MPC · JPL
842203	2015 TU_{250}	—	November 11, 2010	Mount Lemmon	Mount Lemmon Survey	·	1.7 km	MPC · JPL
842204	2015 TR_{252}	—	December 30, 2005	Mount Lemmon	Mount Lemmon Survey	·	1.7 km	MPC · JPL
842205	2015 TE_{253}	—	January 13, 1996	Kitt Peak	Spacewatch	·	510 m	MPC · JPL
842206	2015 TV_{254}	—	October 10, 2015	Haleakala	Pan-STARRS 1	·	1.9 km	MPC · JPL
842207	2015 TQ_{256}	—	October 10, 2015	Haleakala	Pan-STARRS 1	·	1.9 km	MPC · JPL
842208	2015 TK_{257}	—	November 14, 2006	Mount Lemmon	Mount Lemmon Survey	·	1.4 km	MPC · JPL
842209	2015 TN_{257}	—	July 2, 2014	Haleakala	Pan-STARRS 1	3:2	3.9 km	MPC · JPL
842210	2015 TF_{266}	—	July 25, 2011	Haleakala	Pan-STARRS 1	·	890 m	MPC · JPL
842211	2015 TP_{266}	—	October 8, 2015	Catalina	CSS	·	530 m	MPC · JPL
842212	2015 TM_{267}	—	November 16, 2010	Mount Lemmon	Mount Lemmon Survey	·	1.9 km	MPC · JPL
842213	2015 TT_{268}	—	March 30, 2011	Haleakala	Pan-STARRS 1	·	670 m	MPC · JPL
842214	2015 TM_{271}	—	October 28, 2010	Mount Lemmon	Mount Lemmon Survey	EOS	1.3 km	MPC · JPL
842215	2015 TQ_{274}	—	June 10, 2010	WISE	WISE	·	1.5 km	MPC · JPL
842216	2015 TS_{274}	—	October 2, 2015	Mount Lemmon	Mount Lemmon Survey	·	2.1 km	MPC · JPL
842217	2015 TE_{276}	—	December 1, 2005	Kitt Peak	Spacewatch	·	1.1 km	MPC · JPL
842218	2015 TS_{282}	—	March 5, 2013	Haleakala	Pan-STARRS 1	·	780 m	MPC · JPL
842219	2015 TU_{283}	—	May 7, 2014	Haleakala	Pan-STARRS 1	·	1.5 km	MPC · JPL
842220	2015 TH_{288}	—	October 17, 2010	Mount Lemmon	Mount Lemmon Survey	·	1.1 km	MPC · JPL
842221	2015 TO_{289}	—	September 10, 2015	Haleakala	Pan-STARRS 1	EUN	830 m	MPC · JPL
842222	2015 TB_{290}	—	July 2, 2011	Mount Lemmon	Mount Lemmon Survey	·	1.0 km	MPC · JPL
842223	2015 TS_{290}	—	December 7, 1999	Socorro	LINEAR	·	2.0 km	MPC · JPL
842224	2015 TG_{293}	—	September 10, 2015	Haleakala	Pan-STARRS 1	·	1.2 km	MPC · JPL
842225	2015 TQ_{293}	—	September 12, 2015	Haleakala	Pan-STARRS 1	·	1.4 km	MPC · JPL
842226	2015 TO_{295}	—	October 25, 2005	Kitt Peak	Spacewatch	·	1.1 km	MPC · JPL
842227	2015 TW_{295}	—	September 11, 2015	Haleakala	Pan-STARRS 1	·	2.2 km	MPC · JPL
842228	2015 TX_{296}	—	September 12, 2015	Haleakala	Pan-STARRS 1	·	1.8 km	MPC · JPL
842229	2015 TJ_{299}	—	April 4, 2014	Haleakala	Pan-STARRS 1	MAS	610 m	MPC · JPL
842230	2015 TL_{300}	—	May 12, 2010	WISE	WISE	·	1.9 km	MPC · JPL
842231	2015 TH_{301}	—	October 12, 2015	Haleakala	Pan-STARRS 1	MRX	760 m	MPC · JPL
842232	2015 TL_{301}	—	September 9, 2015	Haleakala	Pan-STARRS 1	·	1.8 km	MPC · JPL
842233	2015 TR_{304}	—	October 12, 2015	Haleakala	Pan-STARRS 1	·	1.2 km	MPC · JPL
842234	2015 TA_{305}	—	August 23, 2004	Kitt Peak	Spacewatch	·	1.5 km	MPC · JPL
842235	2015 TU_{305}	—	October 12, 2015	Haleakala	Pan-STARRS 1	·	1.6 km	MPC · JPL
842236	2015 TV_{305}	—	February 3, 2010	WISE	WISE	·	2.4 km	MPC · JPL
842237	2015 TD_{306}	—	October 28, 2011	Mount Lemmon	Mount Lemmon Survey	·	720 m	MPC · JPL
842238	2015 TR_{307}	—	October 12, 2015	Haleakala	Pan-STARRS 1	·	2.2 km	MPC · JPL
842239	2015 TV_{307}	—	August 21, 2015	Haleakala	Pan-STARRS 1	HNS	820 m	MPC · JPL
842240	2015 TH_{310}	—	October 12, 2015	Haleakala	Pan-STARRS 1	TIR	2.2 km	MPC · JPL
842241	2015 TA_{312}	—	July 13, 2010	WISE	WISE	·	1.5 km	MPC · JPL
842242	2015 TY_{312}	—	October 9, 2010	Mount Lemmon	Mount Lemmon Survey	·	1.8 km	MPC · JPL
842243	2015 TM_{314}	—	June 8, 2010	WISE	WISE	·	1.4 km	MPC · JPL
842244	2015 TL_{317}	—	October 5, 2002	Sacramento Peak	SDSS	·	1.1 km	MPC · JPL
842245	2015 TV_{318}	—	September 5, 2010	Mount Lemmon	Mount Lemmon Survey	·	1.5 km	MPC · JPL
842246	2015 TL_{319}	—	November 3, 2007	Kitt Peak	Spacewatch	·	930 m	MPC · JPL
842247	2015 TA_{320}	—	February 5, 2013	Kitt Peak	Spacewatch	·	760 m	MPC · JPL
842248	2015 TR_{320}	—	October 28, 2010	Mount Lemmon	Mount Lemmon Survey	·	1.1 km	MPC · JPL
842249	2015 TM_{324}	—	October 13, 2015	Haleakala	Pan-STARRS 1	HNS	740 m	MPC · JPL
842250	2015 TK_{325}	—	August 12, 2015	Haleakala	Pan-STARRS 1	(5)	910 m	MPC · JPL
842251	2015 TK_{326}	—	October 13, 2015	Haleakala	Pan-STARRS 1	EOS	1.3 km	MPC · JPL
842252	2015 TB_{328}	—	October 11, 2015	Mount Lemmon	Mount Lemmon Survey	EOS	1.4 km	MPC · JPL
842253	2015 TZ_{328}	—	September 23, 2015	Haleakala	Pan-STARRS 1	EOS	1.2 km	MPC · JPL
842254	2015 TB_{329}	—	September 23, 2015	Haleakala	Pan-STARRS 1	·	1.3 km	MPC · JPL
842255	2015 TX_{329}	—	October 13, 2015	Haleakala	Pan-STARRS 1	EOS	1.2 km	MPC · JPL
842256	2015 TJ_{333}	—	November 8, 2010	Mount Lemmon	Mount Lemmon Survey	·	2.0 km	MPC · JPL
842257	2015 TT_{335}	—	October 14, 2015	Kitt Peak	Spacewatch	·	2.1 km	MPC · JPL
842258	2015 TP_{337}	—	October 13, 2005	Kitt Peak	Spacewatch	·	2.1 km	MPC · JPL
842259	2015 TB_{347}	—	October 25, 2008	Kitt Peak	Spacewatch	·	750 m	MPC · JPL
842260	2015 TP_{348}	—	May 7, 2014	Haleakala	Pan-STARRS 1	·	550 m	MPC · JPL
842261	2015 TQ_{349}	—	November 13, 2010	Mount Lemmon	Mount Lemmon Survey	·	1.2 km	MPC · JPL
842262	2015 TF_{350}	—	November 17, 2006	Mount Lemmon	Mount Lemmon Survey	·	1.1 km	MPC · JPL
842263	2015 TB_{351}	—	August 21, 2015	Haleakala	Pan-STARRS 1	·	720 m	MPC · JPL
842264	2015 TJ_{351}	—	October 8, 2015	Oukaïmeden	M. Ory	H	340 m	MPC · JPL
842265	2015 TK_{353}	—	October 10, 2015	Kitt Peak	Spacewatch	H	370 m	MPC · JPL
842266	2015 TO_{353}	—	October 10, 2015	Haleakala	Pan-STARRS 1	H	350 m	MPC · JPL
842267	2015 TY_{353}	—	October 3, 2015	Mount Lemmon	Mount Lemmon Survey	·	1.4 km	MPC · JPL
842268	2015 TF_{356}	—	October 9, 2015	Haleakala	Pan-STARRS 1	·	1.8 km	MPC · JPL
842269	2015 TU_{357}	—	November 10, 2004	Kitt Peak	Deep Ecliptic Survey	·	2.4 km	MPC · JPL
842270	2015 TJ_{360}	—	October 10, 2015	Haleakala	Pan-STARRS 1	EUN	790 m	MPC · JPL
842271	2015 TA_{368}	—	June 17, 2009	Mount Lemmon	Mount Lemmon Survey	·	2.4 km	MPC · JPL
842272	2015 TA_{369}	—	February 6, 2011	Catalina	CSS	·	1.9 km	MPC · JPL
842273	2015 TL_{370}	—	October 2, 2015	Mount Lemmon	Mount Lemmon Survey	V	470 m	MPC · JPL
842274	2015 TM_{370}	—	May 28, 2014	Haleakala	Pan-STARRS 1	·	1.7 km	MPC · JPL
842275	2015 TV_{370}	—	October 12, 2010	Mount Lemmon	Mount Lemmon Survey	EOS	1.4 km	MPC · JPL
842276	2015 TU_{371}	—	September 27, 2006	Kitt Peak	Spacewatch	·	1.0 km	MPC · JPL
842277	2015 TY_{374}	—	October 8, 2015	Haleakala	Pan-STARRS 1	·	2.0 km	MPC · JPL
842278	2015 TQ_{375}	—	August 22, 2004	Kitt Peak	Spacewatch	·	1.6 km	MPC · JPL
842279	2015 TT_{375}	—	September 12, 2010	Kitt Peak	Spacewatch	MRX	730 m	MPC · JPL
842280	2015 TJ_{376}	—	October 10, 2004	Kitt Peak	Spacewatch	·	2.1 km	MPC · JPL
842281	2015 TH_{377}	—	July 25, 2014	Haleakala	Pan-STARRS 1	·	1.9 km	MPC · JPL
842282	2015 TA_{379}	—	April 10, 2013	Haleakala	Pan-STARRS 1	·	1.9 km	MPC · JPL
842283	2015 TD_{379}	—	October 25, 2005	Kitt Peak	Spacewatch	·	1.7 km	MPC · JPL
842284	2015 TJ_{380}	—	October 10, 2015	Haleakala	Pan-STARRS 1	EUN	690 m	MPC · JPL
842285	2015 TN_{380}	—	January 2, 2011	Mount Lemmon	Mount Lemmon Survey	·	1.9 km	MPC · JPL
842286	2015 TT_{380}	—	December 3, 2010	Mount Lemmon	Mount Lemmon Survey	·	1.3 km	MPC · JPL
842287	2015 TM_{381}	—	July 28, 2009	Kitt Peak	Spacewatch	·	1.4 km	MPC · JPL
842288	2015 TZ_{382}	—	October 10, 2015	Haleakala	Pan-STARRS 1	·	1.4 km	MPC · JPL
842289	2015 TM_{384}	—	October 12, 2015	Haleakala	Pan-STARRS 1	VER	1.8 km	MPC · JPL
842290	2015 TP_{387}	—	October 11, 2015	Mount Lemmon	Mount Lemmon Survey	·	2.8 km	MPC · JPL
842291	2015 TE_{388}	—	October 2, 2015	Haleakala	Pan-STARRS 1	T_{j} (2.97)	2.3 km	MPC · JPL
842292	2015 TB_{389}	—	June 28, 2010	WISE	WISE	TIN	1.1 km	MPC · JPL
842293	2015 TX_{389}	—	October 2, 2015	Kitt Peak	Spacewatch	·	920 m	MPC · JPL
842294	2015 TV_{391}	—	October 9, 2015	Haleakala	Pan-STARRS 1	·	2.0 km	MPC · JPL
842295	2015 TY_{391}	—	October 8, 2015	Haleakala	Pan-STARRS 1	·	2.3 km	MPC · JPL
842296	2015 TE_{393}	—	October 12, 2015	Haleakala	Pan-STARRS 1	·	2.0 km	MPC · JPL
842297	2015 TA_{394}	—	October 11, 2015	Mount Lemmon	Mount Lemmon Survey	EUN	890 m	MPC · JPL
842298	2015 TV_{397}	—	October 10, 2015	Haleakala	Pan-STARRS 1	·	1.6 km	MPC · JPL
842299	2015 TK_{407}	—	October 15, 2015	Oukaïmeden	M. Ory	·	1.7 km	MPC · JPL
842300	2015 TJ_{408}	—	October 12, 2015	Haleakala	Pan-STARRS 1	·	2.1 km	MPC · JPL

== 842301–842400 ==
back to top

Designation			Discovery			Properties		Ref
Permanent	Provisional	Named after	Date	Site	Discoverer(s)	Category	Diam.	Ref
842301	2015 TE_{409}	—	October 10, 2015	Haleakala	Pan-STARRS 1	·	700 m	MPC · JPL
842302	2015 TR_{411}	—	October 9, 2015	Haleakala	Pan-STARRS 1	·	1.3 km	MPC · JPL
842303	2015 TJ_{412}	—	October 8, 2015	Haleakala	Pan-STARRS 1	·	670 m	MPC · JPL
842304	2015 TW_{412}	—	October 9, 2015	Haleakala	Pan-STARRS 1	·	750 m	MPC · JPL
842305	2015 TP_{414}	—	October 2, 2015	Mount Lemmon	Mount Lemmon Survey	·	1.1 km	MPC · JPL
842306	2015 TJ_{415}	—	October 14, 2015	Kitt Peak	Spacewatch	·	1.5 km	MPC · JPL
842307	2015 TL_{417}	—	May 7, 2014	Haleakala	Pan-STARRS 1	·	1.3 km	MPC · JPL
842308	2015 TQ_{419}	—	October 13, 2015	Haleakala	Pan-STARRS 1	·	2.0 km	MPC · JPL
842309	2015 TS_{420}	—	October 10, 2015	Haleakala	Pan-STARRS 1	·	1.5 km	MPC · JPL
842310	2015 TF_{423}	—	October 10, 2015	Haleakala	Pan-STARRS 1	·	2.1 km	MPC · JPL
842311	2015 TX_{424}	—	October 9, 2015	Kitt Peak	Spacewatch	H	320 m	MPC · JPL
842312	2015 TT_{425}	—	October 9, 2015	Haleakala	Pan-STARRS 1	THM	1.5 km	MPC · JPL
842313	2015 TP_{426}	—	October 10, 2015	Haleakala	Pan-STARRS 1	·	1.9 km	MPC · JPL
842314	2015 TS_{426}	—	October 12, 2015	Mount Lemmon	Mount Lemmon Survey	H	310 m	MPC · JPL
842315	2015 TN_{427}	—	October 13, 2015	Haleakala	Pan-STARRS 1	·	1.3 km	MPC · JPL
842316	2015 TW_{431}	—	October 10, 2015	Haleakala	Pan-STARRS 1	·	1.5 km	MPC · JPL
842317	2015 TH_{436}	—	October 10, 2015	Haleakala	Pan-STARRS 1	·	1.3 km	MPC · JPL
842318	2015 TK_{442}	—	October 8, 2015	Haleakala	Pan-STARRS 1	·	1.1 km	MPC · JPL
842319	2015 TX_{442}	—	October 15, 2015	Haleakala	Pan-STARRS 1	·	1.8 km	MPC · JPL
842320	2015 TN_{450}	—	October 28, 2006	Catalina	CSS	·	1.5 km	MPC · JPL
842321	2015 TO_{452}	—	October 15, 2015	Mount Lemmon	Mount Lemmon Survey	·	560 m	MPC · JPL
842322	2015 TX_{456}	—	October 10, 2015	Haleakala	Pan-STARRS 1	·	2.6 km	MPC · JPL
842323	2015 TR_{459}	—	October 13, 2015	Haleakala	Pan-STARRS 1	THB	2.3 km	MPC · JPL
842324	2015 TT_{459}	—	October 10, 2015	Haleakala	Pan-STARRS 1	·	2.1 km	MPC · JPL
842325	2015 TV_{467}	—	October 3, 2015	Mount Lemmon	Mount Lemmon Survey	AGN	920 m	MPC · JPL
842326	2015 US_{1}	—	March 15, 2013	Mount Lemmon	Mount Lemmon Survey	·	1.4 km	MPC · JPL
842327	2015 UA_{2}	—	November 1, 2010	Kitt Peak	Spacewatch	·	1.5 km	MPC · JPL
842328	2015 UM_{4}	—	September 21, 2011	Mount Lemmon	Mount Lemmon Survey	·	890 m	MPC · JPL
842329	2015 UV_{4}	—	September 12, 2015	Haleakala	Pan-STARRS 1	EOS	1.3 km	MPC · JPL
842330	2015 UD_{5}	—	September 12, 2015	Haleakala	Pan-STARRS 1	·	530 m	MPC · JPL
842331	2015 UG_{5}	—	October 9, 2004	Kitt Peak	Spacewatch	MAS	610 m	MPC · JPL
842332	2015 UY_{7}	—	September 12, 2015	Haleakala	Pan-STARRS 1	·	1.6 km	MPC · JPL
842333	2015 UC_{8}	—	December 29, 2011	Mount Lemmon	Mount Lemmon Survey	·	1.3 km	MPC · JPL
842334	2015 UT_{15}	—	March 29, 2008	Kitt Peak	Spacewatch	·	1.4 km	MPC · JPL
842335	2015 UJ_{21}	—	September 12, 2015	Haleakala	Pan-STARRS 1	EOS	1.2 km	MPC · JPL
842336	2015 UO_{21}	—	September 12, 2015	Haleakala	Pan-STARRS 1	THM	1.8 km	MPC · JPL
842337	2015 UG_{23}	—	October 18, 2015	Haleakala	Pan-STARRS 1	·	1.3 km	MPC · JPL
842338	2015 UA_{24}	—	October 27, 2005	Mount Lemmon	Mount Lemmon Survey	·	1.5 km	MPC · JPL
842339	2015 UD_{24}	—	September 12, 2015	Haleakala	Pan-STARRS 1	·	510 m	MPC · JPL
842340	2015 UP_{27}	—	November 1, 2010	Mount Lemmon	Mount Lemmon Survey	EOS	1.4 km	MPC · JPL
842341	2015 UD_{29}	—	September 9, 2015	Haleakala	Pan-STARRS 1	EUN	860 m	MPC · JPL
842342	2015 US_{36}	—	August 21, 2015	Haleakala	Pan-STARRS 1	·	2.2 km	MPC · JPL
842343	2015 UX_{36}	—	March 19, 2013	Haleakala	Pan-STARRS 1	EOS	1.2 km	MPC · JPL
842344	2015 UF_{40}	—	October 2, 2006	Kitt Peak	Spacewatch	·	920 m	MPC · JPL
842345	2015 UD_{45}	—	May 16, 2010	WISE	WISE	·	2.5 km	MPC · JPL
842346	2015 UW_{47}	—	October 8, 2015	Haleakala	Pan-STARRS 1	·	1.2 km	MPC · JPL
842347	2015 UH_{49}	—	October 9, 2015	Haleakala	Pan-STARRS 1	·	1.6 km	MPC · JPL
842348	2015 UM_{50}	—	October 18, 2015	Haleakala	Pan-STARRS 1	EOS	1.2 km	MPC · JPL
842349	2015 UX_{54}	—	September 3, 2008	Kitt Peak	Spacewatch	·	550 m	MPC · JPL
842350	2015 UH_{57}	—	January 26, 2012	Mount Lemmon	Mount Lemmon Survey	DOR	1.7 km	MPC · JPL
842351	2015 UY_{58}	—	September 12, 2015	Haleakala	Pan-STARRS 1	EOS	1.3 km	MPC · JPL
842352	2015 UY_{59}	—	October 6, 2008	Mount Lemmon	Mount Lemmon Survey	·	510 m	MPC · JPL
842353	2015 UE_{61}	—	June 24, 2014	Haleakala	Pan-STARRS 1	·	2.5 km	MPC · JPL
842354	2015 UL_{62}	—	August 12, 2015	Haleakala	Pan-STARRS 1	·	1.1 km	MPC · JPL
842355	2015 UZ_{62}	—	October 21, 2015	Palomar	Palomar Transient Factory	EUP	3.6 km	MPC · JPL
842356	2015 US_{68}	—	October 7, 2004	Socorro	LINEAR	·	2.6 km	MPC · JPL
842357	2015 UG_{74}	—	October 23, 2015	Mount Lemmon	Mount Lemmon Survey	·	1.7 km	MPC · JPL
842358	2015 UT_{75}	—	October 24, 2015	Haleakala	Pan-STARRS 1	·	1.7 km	MPC · JPL
842359	2015 UO_{76}	—	October 24, 2015	Haleakala	Pan-STARRS 1	·	1.5 km	MPC · JPL
842360	2015 UR_{77}	—	September 23, 2015	Haleakala	Pan-STARRS 1	·	1.8 km	MPC · JPL
842361	2015 UW_{80}	—	September 12, 2015	Haleakala	Pan-STARRS 1	·	1.3 km	MPC · JPL
842362	2015 UN_{81}	—	October 24, 2015	Haleakala	Pan-STARRS 1	MAR	660 m	MPC · JPL
842363	2015 UC_{82}	—	January 22, 2004	Mauna Kea	Allen, R. L.	·	580 m	MPC · JPL
842364	2015 UZ_{83}	—	July 25, 2015	Haleakala	Pan-STARRS 1	·	920 m	MPC · JPL
842365	2015 US_{85}	—	August 2, 2010	WISE	WISE	·	2.7 km	MPC · JPL
842366	2015 UD_{88}	—	January 20, 2012	Mount Lemmon	Mount Lemmon Survey	·	800 m	MPC · JPL
842367	2015 UW_{88}	—	May 7, 2014	Haleakala	Pan-STARRS 1	·	1.5 km	MPC · JPL
842368	2015 UV_{89}	—	March 1, 2012	Mount Lemmon	Mount Lemmon Survey	·	1.3 km	MPC · JPL
842369	2015 UQ_{90}	—	February 22, 2011	Kitt Peak	Spacewatch	·	2.2 km	MPC · JPL
842370	2015 UU_{95}	—	October 24, 2015	Mount Lemmon	Mount Lemmon Survey	GEF	640 m	MPC · JPL
842371	2015 UQ_{97}	—	October 19, 2015	Haleakala	Pan-STARRS 1	·	1.6 km	MPC · JPL
842372	2015 UA_{100}	—	October 16, 2015	Mount Lemmon	Mount Lemmon Survey	·	1.6 km	MPC · JPL
842373	2015 UD_{100}	—	October 21, 2015	Haleakala	Pan-STARRS 1	·	1.8 km	MPC · JPL
842374	2015 UH_{100}	—	October 23, 2015	Haleakala	Pan-STARRS 1	·	2.2 km	MPC · JPL
842375	2015 VR_{2}	—	January 4, 2000	Socorro	LINEAR	T_{j} (2.92)	1.5 km	MPC · JPL
842376	2015 VP_{3}	—	October 29, 2002	Sacramento Peak	SDSS	·	1.5 km	MPC · JPL
842377	2015 VV_{5}	—	February 14, 2010	Mount Lemmon	Mount Lemmon Survey	·	540 m	MPC · JPL
842378	2015 VA_{6}	—	November 2, 2010	Mount Lemmon	Mount Lemmon Survey	LIX	2.3 km	MPC · JPL
842379	2015 VU_{7}	—	May 21, 2014	Haleakala	Pan-STARRS 1	·	1.7 km	MPC · JPL
842380	2015 VS_{9}	—	September 10, 2015	Haleakala	Pan-STARRS 1	KOR	1.0 km	MPC · JPL
842381	2015 VG_{12}	—	March 20, 2007	Kitt Peak	Spacewatch	·	1.9 km	MPC · JPL
842382	2015 VM_{12}	—	September 17, 2010	Mount Lemmon	Mount Lemmon Survey	TEL	910 m	MPC · JPL
842383	2015 VD_{13}	—	October 23, 2011	Kitt Peak	Spacewatch	(5)	740 m	MPC · JPL
842384	2015 VL_{13}	—	October 29, 2005	Mount Lemmon	Mount Lemmon Survey	·	1.4 km	MPC · JPL
842385	2015 VL_{15}	—	September 12, 2015	Haleakala	Pan-STARRS 1	V	430 m	MPC · JPL
842386	2015 VF_{16}	—	September 2, 2011	Haleakala	Pan-STARRS 1	·	900 m	MPC · JPL
842387	2015 VY_{19}	—	December 26, 2011	Mount Lemmon	Mount Lemmon Survey	·	1.3 km	MPC · JPL
842388	2015 VF_{22}	—	October 10, 2015	Haleakala	Pan-STARRS 1	H	370 m	MPC · JPL
842389	2015 VR_{23}	—	October 30, 2002	Sacramento Peak	SDSS	·	1.2 km	MPC · JPL
842390	2015 VW_{24}	—	October 20, 2011	Mount Lemmon	Mount Lemmon Survey	JUN	790 m	MPC · JPL
842391	2015 VY_{24}	—	April 30, 2014	Haleakala	Pan-STARRS 1	THB	2.1 km	MPC · JPL
842392	2015 VY_{25}	—	October 10, 2015	Haleakala	Pan-STARRS 1	·	2.5 km	MPC · JPL
842393	2015 VJ_{26}	—	November 13, 2010	Mount Lemmon	Mount Lemmon Survey	EOS	1.4 km	MPC · JPL
842394	2015 VW_{26}	—	October 25, 2011	Haleakala	Pan-STARRS 1	·	760 m	MPC · JPL
842395	2015 VD_{27}	—	October 16, 2015	Kitt Peak	Spacewatch	·	490 m	MPC · JPL
842396	2015 VY_{28}	—	October 9, 2008	Mount Lemmon	Mount Lemmon Survey	·	550 m	MPC · JPL
842397	2015 VD_{29}	—	November 1, 2015	Haleakala	Pan-STARRS 1	·	2.0 km	MPC · JPL
842398	2015 VL_{32}	—	July 25, 2011	La Sagra	OAM	·	900 m	MPC · JPL
842399	2015 VW_{33}	—	September 7, 2004	Kitt Peak	Spacewatch	·	1.5 km	MPC · JPL
842400	2015 VO_{34}	—	October 16, 2015	Catalina	CSS	(1547)	1.1 km	MPC · JPL

== 842401–842500 ==
back to top

Designation			Discovery			Properties		Ref
Permanent	Provisional	Named after	Date	Site	Discoverer(s)	Category	Diam.	Ref
842401	2015 VQ_{34}	—	October 20, 2008	Kitt Peak	Spacewatch	·	650 m	MPC · JPL
842402	2015 VR_{34}	—	May 6, 2014	Haleakala	Pan-STARRS 1	·	2.4 km	MPC · JPL
842403	2015 VY_{37}	—	October 7, 2004	Kitt Peak	Spacewatch	·	2.1 km	MPC · JPL
842404	2015 VD_{38}	—	July 25, 2015	Haleakala	Pan-STARRS 1	·	1.7 km	MPC · JPL
842405	2015 VF_{38}	—	September 9, 2015	Haleakala	Pan-STARRS 1	·	1.8 km	MPC · JPL
842406	2015 VR_{38}	—	August 30, 2008	La Sagra	OAM	·	590 m	MPC · JPL
842407	2015 VA_{40}	—	July 28, 2014	Haleakala	Pan-STARRS 1	·	2.5 km	MPC · JPL
842408	2015 VH_{41}	—	October 10, 2015	Haleakala	Pan-STARRS 1	·	2.0 km	MPC · JPL
842409	2015 VS_{41}	—	November 1, 2015	Haleakala	Pan-STARRS 1	TIR	2.0 km	MPC · JPL
842410	2015 VL_{43}	—	July 26, 2015	Haleakala	Pan-STARRS 1	·	1.6 km	MPC · JPL
842411	2015 VB_{44}	—	January 24, 2007	Mount Lemmon	Mount Lemmon Survey	·	1.4 km	MPC · JPL
842412	2015 VC_{44}	—	July 19, 2015	Haleakala	Pan-STARRS 1	EOS	1.2 km	MPC · JPL
842413	2015 VX_{45}	—	July 25, 2015	Haleakala	Pan-STARRS 1	·	2.2 km	MPC · JPL
842414	2015 VL_{50}	—	October 10, 2008	Mount Lemmon	Mount Lemmon Survey	·	930 m	MPC · JPL
842415	2015 VO_{50}	—	July 25, 2015	Haleakala	Pan-STARRS 1	·	1.2 km	MPC · JPL
842416	2015 VL_{51}	—	September 12, 2015	Haleakala	Pan-STARRS 1	·	1.1 km	MPC · JPL
842417	2015 VO_{51}	—	November 2, 2015	Haleakala	Pan-STARRS 1	·	2.2 km	MPC · JPL
842418	2015 VD_{53}	—	October 1, 2005	Mount Lemmon	Mount Lemmon Survey	·	3.0 km	MPC · JPL
842419	2015 VL_{53}	—	October 23, 2004	Kitt Peak	Spacewatch	·	790 m	MPC · JPL
842420	2015 VC_{54}	—	September 4, 2008	Kitt Peak	Spacewatch	·	490 m	MPC · JPL
842421	2015 VZ_{54}	—	January 1, 2012	Mount Lemmon	Mount Lemmon Survey	KOR	920 m	MPC · JPL
842422	2015 VV_{58}	—	January 11, 2008	Kitt Peak	Spacewatch	·	1.1 km	MPC · JPL
842423	2015 VD_{59}	—	September 23, 2015	Haleakala	Pan-STARRS 1	·	490 m	MPC · JPL
842424	2015 VB_{60}	—	March 15, 2010	WISE	WISE	·	1.5 km	MPC · JPL
842425	2015 VP_{61}	—	August 21, 2015	Haleakala	Pan-STARRS 1	·	1.0 km	MPC · JPL
842426	2015 VZ_{67}	—	September 12, 2015	Haleakala	Pan-STARRS 1	·	1.9 km	MPC · JPL
842427	2015 VK_{71}	—	October 10, 2002	Sacramento Peak	SDSS	·	1.7 km	MPC · JPL
842428	2015 VQ_{71}	—	February 12, 2012	Mount Lemmon	Mount Lemmon Survey	·	1.3 km	MPC · JPL
842429	2015 VZ_{73}	—	November 17, 2011	Kitt Peak	Spacewatch	·	620 m	MPC · JPL
842430	2015 VN_{74}	—	January 10, 2008	Mount Lemmon	Mount Lemmon Survey	·	840 m	MPC · JPL
842431	2015 VB_{75}	—	March 29, 2010	WISE	WISE	·	2.0 km	MPC · JPL
842432	2015 VR_{76}	—	October 8, 2015	Haleakala	Pan-STARRS 1	·	740 m	MPC · JPL
842433	2015 VY_{76}	—	July 25, 2014	Haleakala	Pan-STARRS 1	·	1.6 km	MPC · JPL
842434	2015 VH_{77}	—	November 6, 2015	Mount Lemmon	Mount Lemmon Survey	·	1.3 km	MPC · JPL
842435	2015 VX_{80}	—	October 9, 2005	Kitt Peak	Spacewatch	·	2.1 km	MPC · JPL
842436	2015 VD_{82}	—	October 10, 2015	Haleakala	Pan-STARRS 1	·	2.2 km	MPC · JPL
842437	2015 VK_{83}	—	November 12, 2010	Kitt Peak	Spacewatch	·	1.5 km	MPC · JPL
842438	2015 VN_{83}	—	September 18, 2009	Kitt Peak	Spacewatch	TIR	1.9 km	MPC · JPL
842439	2015 VZ_{88}	—	November 6, 2015	Haleakala	Pan-STARRS 1	·	1.7 km	MPC · JPL
842440	2015 VO_{93}	—	July 29, 2014	Haleakala	Pan-STARRS 1	·	2.1 km	MPC · JPL
842441	2015 VN_{95}	—	September 26, 2011	Mount Lemmon	Mount Lemmon Survey	·	840 m	MPC · JPL
842442	2015 VO_{95}	—	October 16, 2015	XuYi	PMO NEO Survey Program	·	890 m	MPC · JPL
842443	2015 VC_{97}	—	January 3, 2011	Mount Lemmon	Mount Lemmon Survey	THM	1.5 km	MPC · JPL
842444	2015 VE_{97}	—	October 8, 2015	Haleakala	Pan-STARRS 1	·	1.0 km	MPC · JPL
842445	2015 VS_{98}	—	September 9, 2015	Haleakala	Pan-STARRS 1	·	650 m	MPC · JPL
842446	2015 VZ_{99}	—	October 17, 2010	Mount Lemmon	Mount Lemmon Survey	·	1.6 km	MPC · JPL
842447	2015 VC_{101}	—	December 16, 2011	Mount Lemmon	Mount Lemmon Survey	·	570 m	MPC · JPL
842448	2015 VD_{101}	—	January 22, 2012	Haleakala	Pan-STARRS 1	DOR	1.7 km	MPC · JPL
842449	2015 VS_{102}	—	July 29, 2014	Haleakala	Pan-STARRS 1	·	1.6 km	MPC · JPL
842450	2015 VT_{102}	—	February 15, 2013	Haleakala	Pan-STARRS 1	·	520 m	MPC · JPL
842451	2015 VB_{104}	—	October 1, 2005	Mount Lemmon	Mount Lemmon Survey	·	520 m	MPC · JPL
842452	2015 VT_{108}	—	October 15, 2015	Haleakala	Pan-STARRS 1	·	2.1 km	MPC · JPL
842453	2015 VQ_{110}	—	October 3, 2015	Mount Lemmon	Mount Lemmon Survey	·	1.5 km	MPC · JPL
842454	2015 VB_{112}	—	February 2, 1995	Kitt Peak	Spacewatch	H	420 m	MPC · JPL
842455	2015 VA_{113}	—	October 24, 2015	Mount Lemmon	Mount Lemmon Survey	·	730 m	MPC · JPL
842456	2015 VH_{114}	—	September 5, 1994	La Silla	E. W. Elst	·	1.5 km	MPC · JPL
842457	2015 VN_{117}	—	September 5, 1994	La Silla	E. W. Elst	(5)	1.5 km	MPC · JPL
842458	2015 VO_{118}	—	January 12, 2010	WISE	WISE	T_{j} (2.98) · EUP	3.3 km	MPC · JPL
842459	2015 VT_{120}	—	October 21, 2015	Haleakala	Pan-STARRS 1	·	1.7 km	MPC · JPL
842460	2015 VV_{121}	—	October 10, 2015	Haleakala	Pan-STARRS 1	·	1.8 km	MPC · JPL
842461	2015 VR_{123}	—	November 30, 2011	Mount Lemmon	Mount Lemmon Survey	·	1.0 km	MPC · JPL
842462	2015 VD_{124}	—	April 22, 2009	Mount Lemmon	Mount Lemmon Survey	·	2.7 km	MPC · JPL
842463	2015 VG_{127}	—	October 10, 2015	Haleakala	Pan-STARRS 1	·	1.7 km	MPC · JPL
842464	2015 VH_{127}	—	September 20, 2015	Mount Lemmon	Mount Lemmon Survey	PHO	650 m	MPC · JPL
842465	2015 VJ_{130}	—	January 1, 2008	Mount Lemmon	Mount Lemmon Survey	·	1.1 km	MPC · JPL
842466	2015 VZ_{134}	—	September 9, 2015	Haleakala	Pan-STARRS 1	·	920 m	MPC · JPL
842467	2015 VB_{135}	—	September 23, 2015	Haleakala	Pan-STARRS 1	PHO	730 m	MPC · JPL
842468	2015 VM_{135}	—	November 20, 2008	Mount Lemmon	Mount Lemmon Survey	·	740 m	MPC · JPL
842469	2015 VS_{139}	—	November 9, 2008	Kitt Peak	Spacewatch	·	480 m	MPC · JPL
842470	2015 VT_{140}	—	February 2, 2006	Mount Lemmon	Mount Lemmon Survey	·	1.7 km	MPC · JPL
842471	2015 VY_{140}	—	September 23, 2009	Mount Lemmon	Mount Lemmon Survey	·	2.0 km	MPC · JPL
842472	2015 VA_{141}	—	December 18, 2004	Mount Lemmon	Mount Lemmon Survey	·	840 m	MPC · JPL
842473	2015 VH_{142}	—	September 16, 2004	Kitt Peak	Spacewatch	·	1.6 km	MPC · JPL
842474	2015 VK_{142}	—	September 19, 2015	Haleakala	Pan-STARRS 1	AMO	470 m	MPC · JPL
842475	2015 VS_{142}	—	August 11, 2015	ISON-SSO	L. Elenin	PHO	2.4 km	MPC · JPL
842476	2015 VY_{144}	—	October 8, 2015	Haleakala	Pan-STARRS 1	·	450 m	MPC · JPL
842477	2015 VX_{146}	—	November 15, 2015	Haleakala	Pan-STARRS 1	·	1.5 km	MPC · JPL
842478	2015 VR_{147}	—	September 12, 2015	Haleakala	Pan-STARRS 1	·	1.8 km	MPC · JPL
842479	2015 VK_{149}	—	March 13, 2012	Mount Lemmon	Mount Lemmon Survey	·	2.3 km	MPC · JPL
842480	2015 VW_{149}	—	September 5, 2010	Mount Lemmon	Mount Lemmon Survey	·	1.3 km	MPC · JPL
842481	2015 VM_{150}	—	November 2, 2010	Kitt Peak	Spacewatch	·	1.7 km	MPC · JPL
842482	2015 VG_{151}	—	November 7, 2015	Calar Alto-CASADO	Hellmich, S., Mottola, S.	TIR	1.6 km	MPC · JPL
842483	2015 VN_{152}	—	March 2, 2006	Kitt Peak	Spacewatch	L5	6.3 km	MPC · JPL
842484	2015 VK_{153}	—	November 6, 2015	Mount Lemmon	Mount Lemmon Survey	H	330 m	MPC · JPL
842485	2015 VL_{153}	—	September 24, 2015	Mount Lemmon	Mount Lemmon Survey	H	380 m	MPC · JPL
842486	2015 VA_{154}	—	November 2, 2015	Haleakala	Pan-STARRS 1	·	2.5 km	MPC · JPL
842487	2015 VH_{154}	—	January 19, 2010	WISE	WISE	EUP	3.6 km	MPC · JPL
842488	2015 VP_{155}	—	May 21, 2006	Mount Lemmon	Mount Lemmon Survey	EUP	3.9 km	MPC · JPL
842489	2015 VN_{157}	—	November 9, 2015	Mount Lemmon	Mount Lemmon Survey	·	1.5 km	MPC · JPL
842490	2015 VG_{158}	—	January 14, 2011	Mount Lemmon	Mount Lemmon Survey	·	1.7 km	MPC · JPL
842491	2015 VT_{159}	—	September 9, 2015	Haleakala	Pan-STARRS 1	·	1.9 km	MPC · JPL
842492	2015 VT_{160}	—	October 21, 2011	Mount Lemmon	Mount Lemmon Survey	·	720 m	MPC · JPL
842493	2015 VL_{162}	—	November 9, 2015	Mount Lemmon	Mount Lemmon Survey	(31811)	2.3 km	MPC · JPL
842494	2015 VN_{162}	—	November 10, 2015	Mount Lemmon	Mount Lemmon Survey	·	2.0 km	MPC · JPL
842495	2015 VT_{163}	—	November 14, 2015	Mount Lemmon	Mount Lemmon Survey	·	2.2 km	MPC · JPL
842496	2015 VL_{174}	—	November 6, 2015	Haleakala	Pan-STARRS 1	·	920 m	MPC · JPL
842497	2015 VM_{176}	—	November 15, 2015	Haleakala	Pan-STARRS 1	·	1.6 km	MPC · JPL
842498	2015 VO_{177}	—	August 8, 2010	WISE	WISE	·	2.3 km	MPC · JPL
842499	2015 VL_{180}	—	August 27, 2009	Kitt Peak	Spacewatch	THM	1.8 km	MPC · JPL
842500	2015 VV_{181}	—	November 3, 2015	Mount Lemmon	Mount Lemmon Survey	·	1.4 km	MPC · JPL

== 842501–842600 ==
back to top

Designation			Discovery			Properties		Ref
Permanent	Provisional	Named after	Date	Site	Discoverer(s)	Category	Diam.	Ref
842501	2015 VW_{181}	—	November 1, 2015	Haleakala	Pan-STARRS 1	·	1.5 km	MPC · JPL
842502	2015 VK_{184}	—	November 3, 2015	Mount Lemmon	Mount Lemmon Survey	·	2.0 km	MPC · JPL
842503	2015 VO_{184}	—	November 14, 2015	Mount Lemmon	Mount Lemmon Survey	·	2.0 km	MPC · JPL
842504	2015 VL_{185}	—	November 7, 2015	Mount Lemmon	Mount Lemmon Survey	·	500 m	MPC · JPL
842505	2015 VK_{186}	—	October 8, 2015	Haleakala	Pan-STARRS 1	V	390 m	MPC · JPL
842506	2015 VS_{186}	—	November 12, 2015	Mount Lemmon	Mount Lemmon Survey	·	700 m	MPC · JPL
842507	2015 VW_{186}	—	November 7, 2015	Mount Lemmon	Mount Lemmon Survey	THM	1.5 km	MPC · JPL
842508	2015 VA_{187}	—	September 21, 2011	Catalina	CSS	·	1.0 km	MPC · JPL
842509	2015 VF_{188}	—	November 6, 2015	Mount Lemmon	Mount Lemmon Survey	PHO	630 m	MPC · JPL
842510	2015 VD_{189}	—	November 7, 2015	Mount Lemmon	Mount Lemmon Survey	·	2.4 km	MPC · JPL
842511	2015 VS_{191}	—	November 7, 2015	Haleakala	Pan-STARRS 1	·	1.9 km	MPC · JPL
842512	2015 VU_{191}	—	November 7, 2015	Mount Lemmon	Mount Lemmon Survey	THM	1.5 km	MPC · JPL
842513	2015 VW_{192}	—	November 3, 2015	Mount Lemmon	Mount Lemmon Survey	·	2.0 km	MPC · JPL
842514	2015 VN_{193}	—	November 3, 2015	Mount Lemmon	Mount Lemmon Survey	·	1.7 km	MPC · JPL
842515	2015 VD_{194}	—	November 7, 2015	Haleakala	Pan-STARRS 1	·	2.1 km	MPC · JPL
842516	2015 VK_{195}	—	November 12, 2015	Mount Lemmon	Mount Lemmon Survey	·	2.3 km	MPC · JPL
842517	2015 VX_{196}	—	November 7, 2015	Haleakala	Pan-STARRS 1	·	1.5 km	MPC · JPL
842518	2015 VE_{199}	—	November 12, 2015	Mount Lemmon	Mount Lemmon Survey	·	1.5 km	MPC · JPL
842519	2015 VS_{200}	—	November 3, 2015	Mount Lemmon	Mount Lemmon Survey	·	1.9 km	MPC · JPL
842520	2015 VM_{203}	—	November 13, 2015	Kitt Peak	Spacewatch	·	1.8 km	MPC · JPL
842521	2015 VS_{208}	—	November 8, 2015	Mount Lemmon	Mount Lemmon Survey	GAL	1.1 km	MPC · JPL
842522	2015 VV_{211}	—	November 13, 2015	Mount Lemmon	Mount Lemmon Survey	·	1.7 km	MPC · JPL
842523	2015 VG_{212}	—	November 8, 2015	Mount Lemmon	Mount Lemmon Survey	·	1.6 km	MPC · JPL
842524	2015 VR_{216}	—	September 9, 2015	Haleakala	Pan-STARRS 1	·	2.0 km	MPC · JPL
842525	2015 VK_{217}	—	October 28, 2011	Zelenchukskaya	T. V. Krjačko	·	1.7 km	MPC · JPL
842526	2015 VE_{218}	—	November 7, 2015	Haleakala	Pan-STARRS 1	H	340 m	MPC · JPL
842527	2015 WA_{1}	—	November 17, 2015	Haleakala	Pan-STARRS 1	APO	160 m	MPC · JPL
842528	2015 WV_{1}	—	November 18, 2015	Catalina	CSS	T_{j} (2.87) · AMO +1km	2.2 km	MPC · JPL
842529	2015 WD_{3}	—	August 22, 2014	Haleakala	Pan-STARRS 1	·	2.0 km	MPC · JPL
842530	2015 WR_{4}	—	November 13, 2015	Kitt Peak	Spacewatch	·	2.2 km	MPC · JPL
842531	2015 WV_{5}	—	November 27, 2010	Mount Lemmon	Mount Lemmon Survey	·	1.3 km	MPC · JPL
842532	2015 WE_{9}	—	December 5, 2008	Mount Lemmon	Mount Lemmon Survey	·	1.3 km	MPC · JPL
842533	2015 WA_{12}	—	January 14, 2010	WISE	WISE	EUP	3.9 km	MPC · JPL
842534	2015 WJ_{12}	—	November 17, 2015	Calar Alto-CASADO	Hellmich, S., Mottola, S.	·	2.2 km	MPC · JPL
842535	2015 WD_{14}	—	September 10, 2010	Kitt Peak	Spacewatch	·	1.4 km	MPC · JPL
842536	2015 WF_{14}	—	January 8, 2010	WISE	WISE	TIR	3.4 km	MPC · JPL
842537	2015 WR_{14}	—	November 11, 2009	Mount Lemmon	Mount Lemmon Survey	EUP	2.9 km	MPC · JPL
842538	2015 WK_{15}	—	November 22, 2015	Mount Lemmon	Mount Lemmon Survey	ERI	1.0 km	MPC · JPL
842539	2015 WX_{16}	—	November 22, 2015	Mount Lemmon	Mount Lemmon Survey	H	350 m	MPC · JPL
842540	2015 WK_{17}	—	March 12, 2010	WISE	WISE	EUP	2.9 km	MPC · JPL
842541	2015 WL_{17}	—	January 7, 2010	WISE	WISE	·	3.1 km	MPC · JPL
842542	2015 WX_{19}	—	November 17, 2015	Haleakala	Pan-STARRS 1	·	2.2 km	MPC · JPL
842543	2015 WE_{20}	—	November 18, 2015	Haleakala	Pan-STARRS 1	·	2.0 km	MPC · JPL
842544	2015 WN_{21}	—	July 25, 2014	Haleakala	Pan-STARRS 1	HYG	1.9 km	MPC · JPL
842545	2015 WU_{21}	—	November 22, 2015	Mount Lemmon	Mount Lemmon Survey	·	2.0 km	MPC · JPL
842546	2015 WY_{22}	—	November 21, 2015	Mount Lemmon	Mount Lemmon Survey	EUP	2.8 km	MPC · JPL
842547	2015 WB_{23}	—	November 21, 2015	Mount Lemmon	Mount Lemmon Survey	·	2.1 km	MPC · JPL
842548	2015 WM_{26}	—	November 22, 2015	Mount Lemmon	Mount Lemmon Survey	·	520 m	MPC · JPL
842549	2015 WB_{27}	—	November 20, 2015	Kitt Peak	Spacewatch	·	930 m	MPC · JPL
842550	2015 WQ_{30}	—	November 21, 2015	Mount Lemmon	Mount Lemmon Survey	·	2.2 km	MPC · JPL
842551	2015 WZ_{30}	—	November 20, 2015	Mount Lemmon	Mount Lemmon Survey	·	2.1 km	MPC · JPL
842552	2015 WB_{31}	—	October 18, 1999	Kitt Peak	Spacewatch	·	1.6 km	MPC · JPL
842553	2015 WH_{33}	—	November 21, 2015	Mount Lemmon	Mount Lemmon Survey	·	1.8 km	MPC · JPL
842554	2015 WS_{35}	—	November 19, 2015	Mount Lemmon	Mount Lemmon Survey	·	1.6 km	MPC · JPL
842555	2015 WJ_{37}	—	November 21, 2015	Mount Lemmon	Mount Lemmon Survey	·	2.6 km	MPC · JPL
842556	2015 WU_{37}	—	November 20, 2015	Mount Lemmon	Mount Lemmon Survey	·	2.2 km	MPC · JPL
842557	2015 WN_{40}	—	November 18, 2015	Haleakala	Pan-STARRS 1	·	2.7 km	MPC · JPL
842558	2015 XY	—	May 18, 2004	Socorro	LINEAR	H	460 m	MPC · JPL
842559	2015 XM_{1}	—	July 27, 2014	Haleakala	Pan-STARRS 1	·	2.3 km	MPC · JPL
842560	2015 XM_{4}	—	October 21, 2015	Haleakala	Pan-STARRS 1	·	2.2 km	MPC · JPL
842561	2015 XT_{4}	—	December 29, 2005	Mount Lemmon	Mount Lemmon Survey	·	1.8 km	MPC · JPL
842562	2015 XR_{7}	—	July 27, 2011	Haleakala	Pan-STARRS 1	·	730 m	MPC · JPL
842563	2015 XY_{8}	—	December 1, 2015	Haleakala	Pan-STARRS 1	·	1.9 km	MPC · JPL
842564	2015 XZ_{9}	—	November 3, 2015	Haleakala	Pan-STARRS 1	·	1.4 km	MPC · JPL
842565	2015 XJ_{13}	—	October 9, 2015	Haleakala	Pan-STARRS 1	·	510 m	MPC · JPL
842566	2015 XR_{13}	—	November 7, 2015	Mount Lemmon	Mount Lemmon Survey	KOR	1 km	MPC · JPL
842567	2015 XA_{14}	—	November 7, 2015	Mount Lemmon	Mount Lemmon Survey	·	1.1 km	MPC · JPL
842568	2015 XS_{16}	—	November 7, 2015	Mount Lemmon	Mount Lemmon Survey	·	1.7 km	MPC · JPL
842569	2015 XU_{16}	—	September 9, 2015	Haleakala	Pan-STARRS 1	MAS	420 m	MPC · JPL
842570	2015 XP_{17}	—	June 23, 2010	WISE	WISE	·	1.4 km	MPC · JPL
842571	2015 XF_{21}	—	August 9, 2004	Socorro	LINEAR	·	800 m	MPC · JPL
842572	2015 XS_{21}	—	October 10, 2015	Haleakala	Pan-STARRS 1	H	420 m	MPC · JPL
842573	2015 XZ_{24}	—	November 1, 2015	Kitt Peak	Spacewatch	·	520 m	MPC · JPL
842574	2015 XD_{28}	—	May 28, 2014	Haleakala	Pan-STARRS 1	LEO	1.1 km	MPC · JPL
842575	2015 XM_{32}	—	October 8, 2015	Haleakala	Pan-STARRS 1	DOR	1.7 km	MPC · JPL
842576	2015 XO_{32}	—	August 10, 2007	Kitt Peak	Spacewatch	·	840 m	MPC · JPL
842577	2015 XJ_{36}	—	February 27, 2012	Haleakala	Pan-STARRS 1	·	1.4 km	MPC · JPL
842578	2015 XE_{38}	—	October 28, 2010	Mount Lemmon	Mount Lemmon Survey	·	1.4 km	MPC · JPL
842579	2015 XA_{39}	—	January 31, 2006	Kitt Peak	Spacewatch	·	2.0 km	MPC · JPL
842580	2015 XB_{46}	—	September 23, 2011	Haleakala	Pan-STARRS 1	·	1.0 km	MPC · JPL
842581	2015 XW_{47}	—	May 6, 2014	Mount Lemmon	Mount Lemmon Survey	H	490 m	MPC · JPL
842582	2015 XZ_{49}	—	July 11, 2010	WISE	WISE	·	2.6 km	MPC · JPL
842583	2015 XV_{53}	—	December 2, 2015	Haleakala	Pan-STARRS 1	·	840 m	MPC · JPL
842584	2015 XY_{54}	—	December 3, 2015	Haleakala	Pan-STARRS 1	H	330 m	MPC · JPL
842585	2015 XE_{56}	—	October 25, 2005	Kitt Peak	Spacewatch	·	450 m	MPC · JPL
842586	2015 XL_{57}	—	January 14, 2011	Mount Lemmon	Mount Lemmon Survey	·	2.2 km	MPC · JPL
842587	2015 XR_{58}	—	June 26, 2010	WISE	WISE	·	2.0 km	MPC · JPL
842588	2015 XZ_{59}	—	December 1, 2015	Haleakala	Pan-STARRS 1	(2076)	520 m	MPC · JPL
842589	2015 XH_{60}	—	August 20, 2014	Haleakala	Pan-STARRS 1	·	2.2 km	MPC · JPL
842590	2015 XJ_{60}	—	October 13, 1999	Sacramento Peak	SDSS	·	2.0 km	MPC · JPL
842591	2015 XZ_{62}	—	December 1, 2015	Haleakala	Pan-STARRS 1	·	790 m	MPC · JPL
842592	2015 XH_{63}	—	January 29, 2010	WISE	WISE	·	3.9 km	MPC · JPL
842593	2015 XP_{66}	—	September 9, 2015	Haleakala	Pan-STARRS 1	·	1.5 km	MPC · JPL
842594	2015 XP_{68}	—	October 19, 2015	Haleakala	Pan-STARRS 1	·	800 m	MPC · JPL
842595	2015 XR_{68}	—	April 27, 2012	Haleakala	Pan-STARRS 1	·	1.7 km	MPC · JPL
842596	2015 XT_{68}	—	October 10, 2002	Sacramento Peak	SDSS	·	1.2 km	MPC · JPL
842597	2015 XM_{71}	—	December 3, 2010	Mount Lemmon	Mount Lemmon Survey	·	1.8 km	MPC · JPL
842598	2015 XN_{72}	—	July 28, 2014	Haleakala	Pan-STARRS 1	VER	1.8 km	MPC · JPL
842599	2015 XD_{73}	—	July 28, 2010	WISE	WISE	·	2.1 km	MPC · JPL
842600	2015 XJ_{73}	—	November 19, 2015	Mount Lemmon	Mount Lemmon Survey	·	1.8 km	MPC · JPL

== 842601–842700 ==
back to top

Designation			Discovery			Properties		Ref
Permanent	Provisional	Named after	Date	Site	Discoverer(s)	Category	Diam.	Ref
842601	2015 XE_{75}	—	November 10, 2004	Kitt Peak	Spacewatch	·	2.3 km	MPC · JPL
842602	2015 XY_{79}	—	August 27, 2014	Haleakala	Pan-STARRS 1	·	1.8 km	MPC · JPL
842603	2015 XL_{81}	—	October 14, 2015	Mount Lemmon	Mount Lemmon Survey	·	2.0 km	MPC · JPL
842604	2015 XE_{82}	—	October 26, 2009	Mount Lemmon	Mount Lemmon Survey	THB	1.9 km	MPC · JPL
842605	2015 XB_{83}	—	October 4, 2004	Kitt Peak	Spacewatch	·	1.4 km	MPC · JPL
842606	2015 XC_{84}	—	October 19, 2015	Haleakala	Pan-STARRS 1	·	930 m	MPC · JPL
842607	2015 XJ_{86}	—	November 16, 2009	Kitt Peak	Spacewatch	THB	2.1 km	MPC · JPL
842608	2015 XW_{87}	—	February 9, 2010	WISE	WISE	·	2.0 km	MPC · JPL
842609	2015 XK_{88}	—	October 8, 2015	Haleakala	Pan-STARRS 1	·	540 m	MPC · JPL
842610	2015 XC_{90}	—	September 23, 2015	Haleakala	Pan-STARRS 1	·	2.3 km	MPC · JPL
842611	2015 XV_{90}	—	November 22, 2015	Mount Lemmon	Mount Lemmon Survey	·	1.6 km	MPC · JPL
842612	2015 XG_{92}	—	September 20, 2009	Mount Lemmon	Mount Lemmon Survey	·	2.2 km	MPC · JPL
842613	2015 XN_{94}	—	September 1, 2014	Mount Lemmon	Mount Lemmon Survey	·	2.2 km	MPC · JPL
842614	2015 XS_{94}	—	October 15, 1999	Kitt Peak	Spacewatch	·	1.5 km	MPC · JPL
842615	2015 XR_{95}	—	July 23, 2010	WISE	WISE	·	1.8 km	MPC · JPL
842616	2015 XM_{96}	—	July 29, 2014	Haleakala	Pan-STARRS 1	·	1.5 km	MPC · JPL
842617	2015 XY_{96}	—	September 26, 2003	Sacramento Peak	SDSS	·	2.2 km	MPC · JPL
842618	2015 XW_{100}	—	August 30, 2014	Mount Lemmon	Mount Lemmon Survey	·	1.9 km	MPC · JPL
842619	2015 XW_{104}	—	August 23, 2014	Haleakala	Pan-STARRS 1	·	2.1 km	MPC · JPL
842620	2015 XD_{106}	—	November 13, 2015	Mount Lemmon	Mount Lemmon Survey	·	550 m	MPC · JPL
842621	2015 XQ_{106}	—	May 23, 2014	Haleakala	Pan-STARRS 1	·	820 m	MPC · JPL
842622	2015 XA_{108}	—	July 28, 2014	Haleakala	Pan-STARRS 1	·	1.9 km	MPC · JPL
842623	2015 XU_{111}	—	December 4, 2015	Haleakala	Pan-STARRS 1	·	940 m	MPC · JPL
842624	2015 XQ_{113}	—	January 2, 2011	Mount Lemmon	Mount Lemmon Survey	·	1.5 km	MPC · JPL
842625	2015 XG_{114}	—	February 27, 2012	Haleakala	Pan-STARRS 1	·	2.2 km	MPC · JPL
842626	2015 XN_{116}	—	February 16, 2012	Haleakala	Pan-STARRS 1	·	1.2 km	MPC · JPL
842627	2015 XR_{117}	—	July 25, 2014	Haleakala	Pan-STARRS 1	·	1.8 km	MPC · JPL
842628	2015 XD_{118}	—	December 4, 2015	Haleakala	Pan-STARRS 1	·	1.7 km	MPC · JPL
842629	2015 XD_{119}	—	December 4, 2015	Haleakala	Pan-STARRS 1	PHO	550 m	MPC · JPL
842630	2015 XO_{120}	—	June 5, 2014	Haleakala	Pan-STARRS 1	·	1.2 km	MPC · JPL
842631	2015 XM_{123}	—	December 4, 2015	Haleakala	Pan-STARRS 1	·	2.5 km	MPC · JPL
842632	2015 XY_{130}	—	December 3, 2015	Mount Lemmon	Mount Lemmon Survey	·	790 m	MPC · JPL
842633	2015 XK_{132}	—	December 4, 2015	Mount Lemmon	Mount Lemmon Survey	·	1.6 km	MPC · JPL
842634	2015 XH_{133}	—	March 27, 2012	Mount Lemmon	Mount Lemmon Survey	·	2.4 km	MPC · JPL
842635	2015 XG_{135}	—	November 7, 2015	Mount Lemmon	Mount Lemmon Survey	·	1.0 km	MPC · JPL
842636	2015 XQ_{135}	—	November 9, 2015	Mount Lemmon	Mount Lemmon Survey	VER	2.1 km	MPC · JPL
842637	2015 XO_{136}	—	May 8, 2013	Haleakala	Pan-STARRS 1	URS	2.1 km	MPC · JPL
842638	2015 XF_{137}	—	April 16, 2013	Cerro Tololo-DECam	DECam	·	670 m	MPC · JPL
842639	2015 XF_{139}	—	May 21, 2014	Haleakala	Pan-STARRS 1	·	560 m	MPC · JPL
842640	2015 XH_{143}	—	October 1, 2005	Mount Lemmon	Mount Lemmon Survey	·	450 m	MPC · JPL
842641	2015 XX_{143}	—	October 8, 2015	Mount Lemmon	Mount Lemmon Survey	·	610 m	MPC · JPL
842642	2015 XV_{147}	—	April 14, 2010	WISE	WISE	ADE	1.6 km	MPC · JPL
842643	2015 XU_{148}	—	November 10, 2015	Mount Lemmon	Mount Lemmon Survey	·	1.3 km	MPC · JPL
842644	2015 XU_{150}	—	September 23, 2015	Haleakala	Pan-STARRS 1	·	1.1 km	MPC · JPL
842645	2015 XJ_{151}	—	December 4, 2015	Haleakala	Pan-STARRS 1	·	780 m	MPC · JPL
842646	2015 XJ_{154}	—	July 27, 2014	Haleakala	Pan-STARRS 1	·	1.5 km	MPC · JPL
842647	2015 XV_{154}	—	November 20, 2015	Mount Lemmon	Mount Lemmon Survey	·	2.5 km	MPC · JPL
842648	2015 XA_{156}	—	October 11, 2015	Mount Lemmon	Mount Lemmon Survey	·	1.5 km	MPC · JPL
842649	2015 XJ_{156}	—	October 11, 2015	Mount Lemmon	Mount Lemmon Survey	·	1.3 km	MPC · JPL
842650	2015 XC_{158}	—	February 24, 2006	Kitt Peak	Spacewatch	·	2.4 km	MPC · JPL
842651	2015 XB_{161}	—	November 9, 2015	Mount Lemmon	Mount Lemmon Survey	·	1.0 km	MPC · JPL
842652	2015 XO_{161}	—	November 2, 2015	Haleakala	Pan-STARRS 1	·	2.1 km	MPC · JPL
842653	2015 XS_{162}	—	December 14, 2010	Mount Lemmon	Mount Lemmon Survey	·	2.0 km	MPC · JPL
842654	2015 XY_{172}	—	May 7, 2014	Haleakala	Pan-STARRS 1	·	1.6 km	MPC · JPL
842655	2015 XY_{174}	—	June 29, 2014	Haleakala	Pan-STARRS 1	·	1.4 km	MPC · JPL
842656	2015 XK_{181}	—	October 23, 2009	Kitt Peak	Spacewatch	·	2.7 km	MPC · JPL
842657	2015 XC_{182}	—	May 16, 2013	Haleakala	Pan-STARRS 1	·	1.3 km	MPC · JPL
842658	2015 XX_{184}	—	December 5, 2015	Haleakala	Pan-STARRS 1	·	2.2 km	MPC · JPL
842659	2015 XE_{185}	—	June 11, 2010	WISE	WISE	·	2.1 km	MPC · JPL
842660	2015 XZ_{187}	—	May 15, 2013	Haleakala	Pan-STARRS 1	·	1.8 km	MPC · JPL
842661	2015 XP_{191}	—	January 4, 2011	Mount Lemmon	Mount Lemmon Survey	EOS	1.4 km	MPC · JPL
842662	2015 XN_{192}	—	October 3, 2006	Mount Lemmon	Mount Lemmon Survey	(17392)	980 m	MPC · JPL
842663	2015 XR_{192}	—	January 2, 2009	Kitt Peak	Spacewatch	NYS	690 m	MPC · JPL
842664	2015 XC_{195}	—	September 24, 2004	Kitt Peak	Spacewatch	·	610 m	MPC · JPL
842665	2015 XS_{199}	—	August 13, 2015	Kitt Peak	Spacewatch	·	1.9 km	MPC · JPL
842666	2015 XN_{200}	—	September 23, 2015	Haleakala	Pan-STARRS 1	·	1.5 km	MPC · JPL
842667	2015 XF_{201}	—	November 9, 2015	Mount Lemmon	Mount Lemmon Survey	·	1.3 km	MPC · JPL
842668	2015 XX_{202}	—	September 19, 2015	Haleakala	Pan-STARRS 1	·	1.7 km	MPC · JPL
842669	2015 XV_{204}	—	December 4, 2015	Mount Lemmon	Mount Lemmon Survey	·	2.2 km	MPC · JPL
842670	2015 XB_{205}	—	December 6, 2015	Haleakala	Pan-STARRS 1	PHO	670 m	MPC · JPL
842671	2015 XY_{207}	—	July 1, 2005	Kitt Peak	Spacewatch	DOR	1.8 km	MPC · JPL
842672	2015 XU_{208}	—	November 22, 2015	Mount Lemmon	Mount Lemmon Survey	·	1.8 km	MPC · JPL
842673	2015 XF_{211}	—	November 9, 2009	Mount Lemmon	Mount Lemmon Survey	·	3.2 km	MPC · JPL
842674	2015 XW_{211}	—	April 17, 2013	Haleakala	Pan-STARRS 1	·	2.5 km	MPC · JPL
842675	2015 XW_{215}	—	November 22, 2015	Mount Lemmon	Mount Lemmon Survey	·	2.1 km	MPC · JPL
842676	2015 XA_{221}	—	December 6, 2015	Mount Lemmon	Mount Lemmon Survey	·	1.9 km	MPC · JPL
842677	2015 XN_{232}	—	January 14, 2011	Mount Lemmon	Mount Lemmon Survey	EOS	1.4 km	MPC · JPL
842678	2015 XC_{233}	—	June 5, 2010	WISE	WISE	·	1.6 km	MPC · JPL
842679	2015 XP_{234}	—	December 6, 2015	Haleakala	Pan-STARRS 1	·	2.0 km	MPC · JPL
842680	2015 XP_{235}	—	December 6, 2015	Haleakala	Pan-STARRS 1	·	1.7 km	MPC · JPL
842681	2015 XQ_{235}	—	September 23, 2009	Mount Lemmon	Mount Lemmon Survey	·	1.6 km	MPC · JPL
842682	2015 XR_{235}	—	December 6, 2015	Haleakala	Pan-STARRS 1	·	1.3 km	MPC · JPL
842683	2015 XD_{236}	—	November 22, 2015	Mount Lemmon	Mount Lemmon Survey	·	1.8 km	MPC · JPL
842684	2015 XK_{237}	—	November 10, 2009	Mount Lemmon	Mount Lemmon Survey	(1118)	2.6 km	MPC · JPL
842685	2015 XR_{237}	—	August 25, 2014	Haleakala	Pan-STARRS 1	EOS	1.4 km	MPC · JPL
842686	2015 XA_{239}	—	September 15, 2009	Kitt Peak	Spacewatch	THM	1.7 km	MPC · JPL
842687	2015 XL_{244}	—	September 19, 2011	Mount Lemmon	Mount Lemmon Survey	V	400 m	MPC · JPL
842688	2015 XJ_{250}	—	May 10, 2014	Haleakala	Pan-STARRS 1	EUN	900 m	MPC · JPL
842689	2015 XZ_{251}	—	May 5, 2000	Sacramento Peak	SDSS	·	2.0 km	MPC · JPL
842690	2015 XH_{252}	—	December 5, 2010	Mount Lemmon	Mount Lemmon Survey	·	2.4 km	MPC · JPL
842691	2015 XQ_{253}	—	July 25, 2014	Haleakala	Pan-STARRS 1	TIR	1.8 km	MPC · JPL
842692	2015 XU_{253}	—	October 10, 2015	Haleakala	Pan-STARRS 1	·	1.9 km	MPC · JPL
842693	2015 XZ_{253}	—	October 13, 2015	Haleakala	Pan-STARRS 1	·	2.0 km	MPC · JPL
842694	2015 XD_{254}	—	December 2, 2005	Kitt Peak	L. H. Wasserman, R. L. Millis	·	2.7 km	MPC · JPL
842695	2015 XD_{255}	—	December 7, 2015	Haleakala	Pan-STARRS 1	·	1.3 km	MPC · JPL
842696	2015 XO_{256}	—	December 7, 2015	Haleakala	Pan-STARRS 1	·	2.5 km	MPC · JPL
842697	2015 XR_{256}	—	May 16, 2010	WISE	WISE	·	1.4 km	MPC · JPL
842698	2015 XV_{256}	—	March 17, 2013	Mount Lemmon	Mount Lemmon Survey	TIN	800 m	MPC · JPL
842699	2015 XK_{257}	—	November 3, 2015	Mount Lemmon	Mount Lemmon Survey	·	850 m	MPC · JPL
842700	2015 XE_{258}	—	December 6, 2015	Mount Lemmon	Mount Lemmon Survey	·	1.3 km	MPC · JPL

== 842701–842800 ==
back to top

Designation			Discovery			Properties		Ref
Permanent	Provisional	Named after	Date	Site	Discoverer(s)	Category	Diam.	Ref
842701	2015 XG_{264}	—	November 22, 2015	Mount Lemmon	Mount Lemmon Survey	·	980 m	MPC · JPL
842702	2015 XE_{266}	—	September 23, 2015	Haleakala	Pan-STARRS 1	·	2.4 km	MPC · JPL
842703	2015 XT_{266}	—	March 20, 1999	Sacramento Peak	SDSS	NEM	1.7 km	MPC · JPL
842704	2015 XX_{268}	—	December 4, 2007	Kitt Peak	Spacewatch	·	570 m	MPC · JPL
842705	2015 XA_{272}	—	August 15, 2014	Haleakala	Pan-STARRS 1	KOR	1.1 km	MPC · JPL
842706	2015 XS_{273}	—	January 18, 2012	Kitt Peak	Spacewatch	·	970 m	MPC · JPL
842707	2015 XW_{274}	—	September 4, 2014	Haleakala	Pan-STARRS 1	·	2.0 km	MPC · JPL
842708	2015 XS_{275}	—	July 21, 2010	WISE	WISE	·	1.2 km	MPC · JPL
842709	2015 XL_{276}	—	August 28, 2009	Kitt Peak	Spacewatch	·	1.6 km	MPC · JPL
842710	2015 XY_{279}	—	December 7, 2015	Haleakala	Pan-STARRS 1	·	480 m	MPC · JPL
842711	2015 XS_{281}	—	September 2, 2014	Haleakala	Pan-STARRS 1	EOS	1.2 km	MPC · JPL
842712	2015 XO_{283}	—	September 24, 2008	Mount Lemmon	Mount Lemmon Survey	·	570 m	MPC · JPL
842713	2015 XZ_{286}	—	July 25, 2014	Haleakala	Pan-STARRS 1	·	1.7 km	MPC · JPL
842714	2015 XZ_{290}	—	December 7, 2015	Haleakala	Pan-STARRS 1	·	1.8 km	MPC · JPL
842715	2015 XP_{292}	—	November 10, 2015	Mount Lemmon	Mount Lemmon Survey	V	490 m	MPC · JPL
842716	2015 XS_{298}	—	November 22, 2015	Mount Lemmon	Mount Lemmon Survey	·	730 m	MPC · JPL
842717	2015 XX_{300}	—	December 7, 2015	Haleakala	Pan-STARRS 1	·	2.4 km	MPC · JPL
842718	2015 XK_{301}	—	August 23, 2014	Haleakala	Pan-STARRS 1	·	2.2 km	MPC · JPL
842719	2015 XG_{303}	—	February 3, 2012	Haleakala	Pan-STARRS 1	AEO	800 m	MPC · JPL
842720	2015 XJ_{304}	—	June 18, 2010	WISE	WISE	ADE	1.3 km	MPC · JPL
842721	2015 XZ_{306}	—	September 12, 2009	Kitt Peak	Spacewatch	·	1.6 km	MPC · JPL
842722	2015 XY_{308}	—	November 7, 2015	Mount Lemmon	Mount Lemmon Survey	·	2.8 km	MPC · JPL
842723	2015 XQ_{309}	—	October 18, 2004	Bakırtepe	I. Bikmaev, I. Khamitov	NYS	720 m	MPC · JPL
842724	2015 XZ_{311}	—	January 20, 2010	WISE	WISE	LIX	2.8 km	MPC · JPL
842725	2015 XD_{317}	—	July 25, 2014	Haleakala	Pan-STARRS 1	·	1.7 km	MPC · JPL
842726	2015 XS_{322}	—	December 8, 2015	Haleakala	Pan-STARRS 1	·	1.2 km	MPC · JPL
842727	2015 XC_{326}	—	December 8, 2015	Haleakala	Pan-STARRS 1	·	1.4 km	MPC · JPL
842728	2015 XZ_{329}	—	December 8, 2015	Haleakala	Pan-STARRS 1	·	680 m	MPC · JPL
842729	2015 XW_{332}	—	December 6, 2015	Mount Lemmon	Mount Lemmon Survey	·	4.1 km	MPC · JPL
842730	2015 XT_{335}	—	October 24, 2009	Kitt Peak	Spacewatch	LIX	3.3 km	MPC · JPL
842731	2015 XT_{336}	—	October 23, 2009	Mount Lemmon	Mount Lemmon Survey	THM	1.6 km	MPC · JPL
842732	2015 XB_{337}	—	February 20, 2009	Kitt Peak	Spacewatch	NYS	780 m	MPC · JPL
842733	2015 XD_{339}	—	December 8, 2015	Haleakala	Pan-STARRS 1	·	610 m	MPC · JPL
842734	2015 XK_{340}	—	July 25, 2014	Haleakala	Pan-STARRS 1	THM	1.6 km	MPC · JPL
842735	2015 XZ_{346}	—	September 30, 1995	Kitt Peak	Spacewatch	KOR	1.0 km	MPC · JPL
842736	2015 XJ_{348}	—	July 30, 2014	Haleakala	Pan-STARRS 1	HYG	1.6 km	MPC · JPL
842737	2015 XC_{362}	—	December 14, 2004	Kitt Peak	Spacewatch	TIR	2.6 km	MPC · JPL
842738	2015 XW_{362}	—	December 12, 2015	Haleakala	Pan-STARRS 1	·	1.6 km	MPC · JPL
842739	2015 XZ_{362}	—	August 27, 2014	Haleakala	Pan-STARRS 1	·	2.3 km	MPC · JPL
842740	2015 XV_{364}	—	November 21, 2009	Catalina	CSS	·	3.8 km	MPC · JPL
842741	2015 XX_{367}	—	September 2, 2014	Haleakala	Pan-STARRS 1	·	2.0 km	MPC · JPL
842742	2015 XM_{371}	—	September 27, 2009	Kitt Peak	Spacewatch	·	1.8 km	MPC · JPL
842743	2015 XW_{371}	—	November 25, 2009	Mount Lemmon	Mount Lemmon Survey	(1118)	2.7 km	MPC · JPL
842744	2015 XO_{375}	—	January 13, 2011	Kitt Peak	Spacewatch	·	2.4 km	MPC · JPL
842745	2015 XT_{379}	—	November 1, 2006	Mount Lemmon	Mount Lemmon Survey	·	850 m	MPC · JPL
842746	2015 XW_{380}	—	April 11, 2010	WISE	WISE	·	1.8 km	MPC · JPL
842747	2015 XA_{385}	—	May 7, 2014	Haleakala	Pan-STARRS 1	H	340 m	MPC · JPL
842748	2015 XU_{385}	—	December 9, 2015	Haleakala	Pan-STARRS 1	H	380 m	MPC · JPL
842749	2015 XF_{388}	—	June 19, 2014	Haleakala	Pan-STARRS 1	H	390 m	MPC · JPL
842750	2015 XO_{388}	—	December 8, 2015	Mount Lemmon	Mount Lemmon Survey	H	370 m	MPC · JPL
842751	2015 XR_{389}	—	December 4, 2015	Haleakala	Pan-STARRS 1	·	1.1 km	MPC · JPL
842752	2015 XV_{391}	—	March 8, 2010	WISE	WISE	·	2.3 km	MPC · JPL
842753	2015 XC_{392}	—	January 8, 2010	Kitt Peak	Spacewatch	·	3.6 km	MPC · JPL
842754	2015 XC_{394}	—	February 13, 2010	WISE	WISE	·	2.5 km	MPC · JPL
842755	2015 XC_{395}	—	April 26, 2010	WISE	WISE	·	2.8 km	MPC · JPL
842756	2015 XR_{400}	—	August 25, 2014	Haleakala	Pan-STARRS 1	·	1.7 km	MPC · JPL
842757	2015 XK_{401}	—	August 23, 2014	Haleakala	Pan-STARRS 1	·	2.0 km	MPC · JPL
842758	2015 XB_{404}	—	December 13, 2015	Haleakala	Pan-STARRS 1	615	1.3 km	MPC · JPL
842759	2015 XH_{404}	—	December 1, 2015	Haleakala	Pan-STARRS 1	TRE	1.8 km	MPC · JPL
842760	2015 XR_{409}	—	February 16, 2012	Haleakala	Pan-STARRS 1	·	890 m	MPC · JPL
842761	2015 XA_{412}	—	December 8, 2015	Haleakala	Pan-STARRS 1	·	790 m	MPC · JPL
842762	2015 XR_{413}	—	November 16, 2009	Mount Lemmon	Mount Lemmon Survey	THM	1.7 km	MPC · JPL
842763	2015 XS_{413}	—	September 29, 2009	Kitt Peak	Spacewatch	·	1.6 km	MPC · JPL
842764	2015 XK_{416}	—	January 27, 2011	Catalina	CSS	·	2.6 km	MPC · JPL
842765	2015 XW_{419}	—	November 27, 2006	Mount Lemmon	Mount Lemmon Survey	JUN	870 m	MPC · JPL
842766	2015 XJ_{421}	—	December 14, 2015	Haleakala	Pan-STARRS 1	BRA	870 m	MPC · JPL
842767	2015 XU_{422}	—	December 8, 2015	Haleakala	Pan-STARRS 1	·	2.2 km	MPC · JPL
842768	2015 XU_{425}	—	December 6, 2015	Mount Lemmon	Mount Lemmon Survey	NYS	860 m	MPC · JPL
842769	2015 XH_{426}	—	December 8, 2015	Haleakala	Pan-STARRS 1	(194)	990 m	MPC · JPL
842770	2015 XJ_{427}	—	December 13, 2015	Haleakala	Pan-STARRS 1	·	1.0 km	MPC · JPL
842771	2015 XF_{428}	—	December 3, 2015	Haleakala	Pan-STARRS 1	·	970 m	MPC · JPL
842772	2015 XP_{428}	—	December 13, 2015	Haleakala	Pan-STARRS 1	·	2.9 km	MPC · JPL
842773	2015 XR_{428}	—	December 2, 2015	Haleakala	Pan-STARRS 1	H	500 m	MPC · JPL
842774	2015 XW_{435}	—	May 1, 2010	WISE	WISE	·	1.9 km	MPC · JPL
842775	2015 XZ_{435}	—	December 9, 2015	Mount Lemmon	Mount Lemmon Survey	·	1.9 km	MPC · JPL
842776	2015 XJ_{444}	—	December 4, 2015	Haleakala	Pan-STARRS 1	MRX	830 m	MPC · JPL
842777	2015 XS_{444}	—	December 4, 2015	Haleakala	Pan-STARRS 1	·	1.8 km	MPC · JPL
842778	2015 XM_{445}	—	December 8, 2015	Mount Lemmon	Mount Lemmon Survey	·	1.4 km	MPC · JPL
842779	2015 XW_{447}	—	December 9, 2015	Haleakala	Pan-STARRS 1	·	2.1 km	MPC · JPL
842780	2015 XF_{448}	—	December 13, 2015	Haleakala	Pan-STARRS 1	·	2.2 km	MPC · JPL
842781	2015 XL_{448}	—	November 8, 2009	Kitt Peak	Spacewatch	THM	1.5 km	MPC · JPL
842782	2015 XV_{449}	—	December 6, 2015	Mount Lemmon	Mount Lemmon Survey	·	1.7 km	MPC · JPL
842783	2015 XB_{451}	—	December 8, 2015	Haleakala	Pan-STARRS 1	·	1.9 km	MPC · JPL
842784	2015 XH_{453}	—	December 9, 2015	Haleakala	Pan-STARRS 1	VER	1.9 km	MPC · JPL
842785	2015 XJ_{453}	—	December 4, 2015	Haleakala	Pan-STARRS 1	·	2.1 km	MPC · JPL
842786	2015 XG_{454}	—	December 14, 2015	Kitt Peak	Spacewatch	H	410 m	MPC · JPL
842787	2015 XU_{454}	—	December 9, 2015	Haleakala	Pan-STARRS 1	·	2.6 km	MPC · JPL
842788	2015 XX_{455}	—	December 6, 2015	Mount Lemmon	Mount Lemmon Survey	·	1.8 km	MPC · JPL
842789	2015 XN_{457}	—	December 4, 2015	Haleakala	Pan-STARRS 1	·	1.5 km	MPC · JPL
842790	2015 XP_{457}	—	December 10, 2015	Mount Lemmon	Mount Lemmon Survey	·	1.6 km	MPC · JPL
842791	2015 XV_{457}	—	December 2, 2015	Heaven on Earth Ob	W. K. Y. Yeung	·	2.1 km	MPC · JPL
842792	2015 XJ_{458}	—	December 8, 2015	Mount Lemmon	Mount Lemmon Survey	·	2.3 km	MPC · JPL
842793	2015 XO_{458}	—	December 6, 2015	Mount Lemmon	Mount Lemmon Survey	·	2.3 km	MPC · JPL
842794	2015 XU_{461}	—	December 9, 2015	Mount Lemmon	Mount Lemmon Survey	·	1.8 km	MPC · JPL
842795	2015 XQ_{462}	—	December 8, 2015	Mount Lemmon	Mount Lemmon Survey	VER	1.8 km	MPC · JPL
842796	2015 XD_{464}	—	December 14, 2015	Mount Lemmon	Mount Lemmon Survey	·	1.7 km	MPC · JPL
842797	2015 XX_{464}	—	December 10, 2015	Mount Lemmon	Mount Lemmon Survey	·	1.5 km	MPC · JPL
842798	2015 XP_{467}	—	December 4, 2015	Mount Lemmon	Mount Lemmon Survey	·	820 m	MPC · JPL
842799	2015 XQ_{468}	—	December 9, 2015	Haleakala	Pan-STARRS 1	·	1.8 km	MPC · JPL
842800	2015 XG_{471}	—	December 4, 2015	Haleakala	Pan-STARRS 1	L5	5.9 km	MPC · JPL

== 842801–842900 ==
back to top

Designation			Discovery			Properties		Ref
Permanent	Provisional	Named after	Date	Site	Discoverer(s)	Category	Diam.	Ref
842801	2015 XV_{472}	—	December 2, 2015	Haleakala	Pan-STARRS 1	·	2.0 km	MPC · JPL
842802	2015 XN_{483}	—	December 5, 2015	Haleakala	Pan-STARRS 1	·	2.0 km	MPC · JPL
842803	2015 XL_{486}	—	December 7, 2015	Haleakala	Pan-STARRS 1	·	2.1 km	MPC · JPL
842804	2015 XK_{491}	—	July 30, 2014	Haleakala	Pan-STARRS 1	KOR	1.1 km	MPC · JPL
842805	2015 XA_{493}	—	December 8, 2015	Mount Lemmon	Mount Lemmon Survey	·	1.5 km	MPC · JPL
842806	2015 XX_{495}	—	May 28, 2010	WISE	WISE	KON	1.6 km	MPC · JPL
842807	2015 XL_{500}	—	December 5, 2015	Haleakala	Pan-STARRS 1	·	2.0 km	MPC · JPL
842808	2015 YF_{4}	—	October 24, 2009	Kitt Peak	Spacewatch	·	1.8 km	MPC · JPL
842809	2015 YX_{4}	—	April 4, 2010	WISE	WISE	T_{j} (2.98)	3.9 km	MPC · JPL
842810	2015 YH_{5}	—	November 1, 2008	Mount Lemmon	Mount Lemmon Survey	·	490 m	MPC · JPL
842811	2015 YO_{5}	—	January 17, 2010	WISE	WISE	T_{j} (2.98)	2.2 km	MPC · JPL
842812	2015 YU_{9}	—	May 23, 2014	Haleakala	Pan-STARRS 1	H	340 m	MPC · JPL
842813	2015 YJ_{11}	—	April 10, 2000	Kitt Peak	M. W. Buie	·	2.1 km	MPC · JPL
842814	2015 YJ_{13}	—	October 10, 2002	Sacramento Peak	SDSS	ADE	1.8 km	MPC · JPL
842815	2015 YK_{13}	—	May 30, 2014	Mount Lemmon	Mount Lemmon Survey	PHO	680 m	MPC · JPL
842816	2015 YA_{15}	—	January 28, 2010	WISE	WISE	·	2.2 km	MPC · JPL
842817	2015 YK_{17}	—	February 24, 2010	WISE	WISE	THB	1.7 km	MPC · JPL
842818	2015 YK_{18}	—	October 26, 2009	Kitt Peak	Spacewatch	·	3.8 km	MPC · JPL
842819	2015 YS_{20}	—	December 28, 2000	Kitt Peak	Spacewatch	·	670 m	MPC · JPL
842820	2015 YZ_{20}	—	January 7, 2010	Mount Lemmon	Mount Lemmon Survey	·	3.0 km	MPC · JPL
842821	2015 YY_{21}	—	March 1, 2011	Catalina	CSS	H	530 m	MPC · JPL
842822	2015 YK_{22}	—	December 18, 2015	Mount Lemmon	Mount Lemmon Survey	·	1.2 km	MPC · JPL
842823	2015 YR_{22}	—	December 18, 2015	Mount Lemmon	Mount Lemmon Survey	·	2.4 km	MPC · JPL
842824	2015 YW_{22}	—	February 25, 2010	WISE	WISE	·	2.4 km	MPC · JPL
842825	2015 YX_{24}	—	September 25, 2009	Kitt Peak	Spacewatch	THM	1.5 km	MPC · JPL
842826	2015 YB_{30}	—	December 21, 2015	Mount Lemmon	Mount Lemmon Survey	·	1.2 km	MPC · JPL
842827	2015 YK_{32}	—	December 18, 2015	Mount Lemmon	Mount Lemmon Survey	KOR	920 m	MPC · JPL
842828	2015 YN_{33}	—	December 17, 2015	Mount Lemmon	Mount Lemmon Survey	·	2.0 km	MPC · JPL
842829	2015 YS_{33}	—	December 19, 2015	Catalina	CSS	H	430 m	MPC · JPL
842830	2015 YD_{34}	—	December 17, 2015	Catalina	CSS	·	2.4 km	MPC · JPL
842831	2015 YB_{35}	—	December 21, 2015	Mount Lemmon	Mount Lemmon Survey	RAF	730 m	MPC · JPL
842832	2015 YN_{35}	—	December 21, 2015	Mount Lemmon	Mount Lemmon Survey	·	2.5 km	MPC · JPL
842833	2016 AZ	—	December 1, 2006	Mount Lemmon	Mount Lemmon Survey	ADE	1.6 km	MPC · JPL
842834	2016 AD_{1}	—	March 15, 2010	WISE	WISE	EUP	3.2 km	MPC · JPL
842835	2016 AD_{2}	—	January 1, 2016	Haleakala	Pan-STARRS 1	H	410 m	MPC · JPL
842836	2016 AJ_{3}	—	November 21, 2009	Catalina	CSS	EUP	4.2 km	MPC · JPL
842837	2016 AW_{3}	—	December 4, 2015	Haleakala	Pan-STARRS 1	(1547)	1.0 km	MPC · JPL
842838	2016 AB_{5}	—	February 12, 2010	WISE	WISE	·	2.9 km	MPC · JPL
842839	2016 AH_{7}	—	December 9, 2015	Mount Lemmon	Mount Lemmon Survey	H	440 m	MPC · JPL
842840	2016 AS_{9}	—	January 2, 2016	Catalina	CSS	H	480 m	MPC · JPL
842841	2016 AE_{10}	—	January 16, 2005	Mauna Kea	Veillet, C.	·	2.3 km	MPC · JPL
842842	2016 AW_{10}	—	March 27, 2010	WISE	WISE	T_{j} (2.99)	2.9 km	MPC · JPL
842843	2016 AG_{16}	—	September 4, 2007	Mount Lemmon	Mount Lemmon Survey	MAS	520 m	MPC · JPL
842844	2016 AQ_{17}	—	February 19, 2009	Catalina	CSS	·	990 m	MPC · JPL
842845	2016 AY_{19}	—	January 3, 2016	Mount Lemmon	Mount Lemmon Survey	·	2.0 km	MPC · JPL
842846	2016 AZ_{21}	—	November 25, 2009	Mount Lemmon	Mount Lemmon Survey	·	1.8 km	MPC · JPL
842847	2016 AU_{25}	—	January 28, 2007	Mount Lemmon	Mount Lemmon Survey	·	1.2 km	MPC · JPL
842848	2016 AH_{39}	—	May 24, 2010	WISE	WISE	·	1.3 km	MPC · JPL
842849	2016 AU_{49}	—	January 4, 2016	Haleakala	Pan-STARRS 1	·	2.3 km	MPC · JPL
842850	2016 AM_{50}	—	September 19, 2011	Mount Lemmon	Mount Lemmon Survey	·	510 m	MPC · JPL
842851	2016 AP_{50}	—	July 1, 2014	Haleakala	Pan-STARRS 1	NYS	970 m	MPC · JPL
842852	2016 AB_{51}	—	January 4, 2016	Haleakala	Pan-STARRS 1	·	2.0 km	MPC · JPL
842853	2016 AL_{52}	—	March 1, 2010	WISE	WISE	THB	2.2 km	MPC · JPL
842854	2016 AU_{56}	—	January 4, 2016	Haleakala	Pan-STARRS 1	·	1.3 km	MPC · JPL
842855	2016 AQ_{60}	—	December 18, 2015	Mount Lemmon	Mount Lemmon Survey	·	1.5 km	MPC · JPL
842856	2016 AC_{63}	—	July 19, 2010	WISE	WISE	·	1.2 km	MPC · JPL
842857	2016 AT_{63}	—	December 3, 2015	Mount Lemmon	Mount Lemmon Survey	·	2.0 km	MPC · JPL
842858	2016 AR_{67}	—	February 6, 2010	WISE	WISE	EUP	3.0 km	MPC · JPL
842859	2016 AS_{67}	—	January 4, 2016	Haleakala	Pan-STARRS 1	·	1.5 km	MPC · JPL
842860	2016 AR_{72}	—	August 31, 2014	Mount Lemmon	Mount Lemmon Survey	THM	1.8 km	MPC · JPL
842861	2016 AT_{73}	—	December 17, 2009	Mount Lemmon	Mount Lemmon Survey	·	2.4 km	MPC · JPL
842862	2016 AA_{74}	—	April 7, 2010	WISE	WISE	T_{j} (2.96)	2.9 km	MPC · JPL
842863	2016 AR_{74}	—	August 31, 2014	Haleakala	Pan-STARRS 1	·	2.3 km	MPC · JPL
842864	2016 AS_{75}	—	March 20, 2010	WISE	WISE	T_{j} (2.99)	2.6 km	MPC · JPL
842865	2016 AL_{76}	—	January 4, 2016	Haleakala	Pan-STARRS 1	·	3.1 km	MPC · JPL
842866	2016 AU_{78}	—	October 2, 2008	Mount Lemmon	Mount Lemmon Survey	·	2.2 km	MPC · JPL
842867	2016 AL_{80}	—	November 18, 2008	Kitt Peak	Spacewatch	·	480 m	MPC · JPL
842868	2016 AQ_{82}	—	November 19, 2009	Catalina	CSS	·	3.7 km	MPC · JPL
842869	2016 AX_{82}	—	February 15, 2013	Haleakala	Pan-STARRS 1	·	710 m	MPC · JPL
842870	2016 AK_{83}	—	November 12, 2015	Mount Lemmon	Mount Lemmon Survey	·	2.6 km	MPC · JPL
842871	2016 AJ_{85}	—	November 16, 2009	Mount Lemmon	Mount Lemmon Survey	HYG	2.3 km	MPC · JPL
842872	2016 AY_{89}	—	December 16, 2003	Mauna Kea	D. D. Balam	·	2.8 km	MPC · JPL
842873	2016 AD_{95}	—	December 17, 2009	Kitt Peak	Spacewatch	THM	1.7 km	MPC · JPL
842874	2016 AC_{97}	—	February 21, 2010	WISE	WISE	·	2.1 km	MPC · JPL
842875	2016 AJ_{99}	—	August 3, 2014	Haleakala	Pan-STARRS 1	·	930 m	MPC · JPL
842876	2016 AA_{101}	—	January 7, 2016	Haleakala	Pan-STARRS 1	·	620 m	MPC · JPL
842877	2016 AR_{101}	—	February 28, 2010	WISE	WISE	·	2.9 km	MPC · JPL
842878	2016 AY_{101}	—	November 8, 2009	Mount Lemmon	Mount Lemmon Survey	·	2.4 km	MPC · JPL
842879	2016 AP_{102}	—	March 6, 2010	WISE	WISE	·	3.9 km	MPC · JPL
842880	2016 AR_{109}	—	November 7, 2007	Kitt Peak	Spacewatch	·	800 m	MPC · JPL
842881	2016 AT_{109}	—	January 7, 2016	Haleakala	Pan-STARRS 1	·	910 m	MPC · JPL
842882	2016 AA_{115}	—	March 7, 2010	WISE	WISE	LIX	3.3 km	MPC · JPL
842883	2016 AA_{116}	—	December 20, 2004	Mount Lemmon	Mount Lemmon Survey	·	2.7 km	MPC · JPL
842884	2016 AK_{118}	—	January 10, 2010	Mount Lemmon	Mount Lemmon Survey	THB	2.0 km	MPC · JPL
842885	2016 AU_{118}	—	September 19, 2014	Haleakala	Pan-STARRS 1	·	2.1 km	MPC · JPL
842886	2016 AJ_{123}	—	March 10, 2010	WISE	WISE	·	3.1 km	MPC · JPL
842887	2016 AD_{125}	—	April 5, 2011	Mount Lemmon	Mount Lemmon Survey	LIX	3.1 km	MPC · JPL
842888	2016 AU_{125}	—	December 17, 2009	Mount Lemmon	Mount Lemmon Survey	·	2.0 km	MPC · JPL
842889	2016 AV_{125}	—	January 27, 2012	Mount Lemmon	Mount Lemmon Survey	PHO	730 m	MPC · JPL
842890	2016 AN_{129}	—	February 7, 2010	WISE	WISE	·	1.9 km	MPC · JPL
842891	2016 AC_{130}	—	September 14, 2007	Mount Lemmon	Mount Lemmon Survey	·	3.2 km	MPC · JPL
842892	2016 AW_{130}	—	January 11, 2016	Haleakala	Pan-STARRS 1	H	380 m	MPC · JPL
842893	2016 AB_{133}	—	January 28, 2010	WISE	WISE	·	2.0 km	MPC · JPL
842894	2016 AL_{133}	—	February 17, 2010	WISE	WISE	·	2.6 km	MPC · JPL
842895	2016 AQ_{136}	—	November 9, 2009	Mount Lemmon	Mount Lemmon Survey	·	2.0 km	MPC · JPL
842896	2016 AZ_{138}	—	January 4, 2016	Haleakala	Pan-STARRS 1	·	2.1 km	MPC · JPL
842897	2016 AG_{143}	—	February 21, 2007	Mount Lemmon	Mount Lemmon Survey	·	1.4 km	MPC · JPL
842898	2016 AH_{144}	—	January 27, 2010	WISE	WISE	·	2.3 km	MPC · JPL
842899	2016 AZ_{144}	—	January 9, 2016	Haleakala	Pan-STARRS 1	EUP	2.6 km	MPC · JPL
842900	2016 AF_{147}	—	April 3, 2010	WISE	WISE	·	2.8 km	MPC · JPL

== 842901–843000 ==
back to top

Designation			Discovery			Properties		Ref
Permanent	Provisional	Named after	Date	Site	Discoverer(s)	Category	Diam.	Ref
842901	2016 AQ_{153}	—	January 11, 2016	Haleakala	Pan-STARRS 1	·	880 m	MPC · JPL
842902	2016 AP_{155}	—	November 19, 2003	Kitt Peak	Spacewatch	·	1.9 km	MPC · JPL
842903	2016 AT_{163}	—	December 22, 2003	Kitt Peak	Spacewatch	·	3.9 km	MPC · JPL
842904	2016 AW_{163}	—	November 25, 2011	Haleakala	Pan-STARRS 1	·	850 m	MPC · JPL
842905	2016 AD_{164}	—	April 14, 2010	WISE	WISE	·	2.7 km	MPC · JPL
842906	2016 AW_{165}	—	January 14, 2016	Mount Lemmon	Mount Lemmon Survey	BAR	1.1 km	MPC · JPL
842907	2016 AH_{171}	—	May 25, 2010	WISE	WISE	·	2.2 km	MPC · JPL
842908	2016 AV_{172}	—	November 19, 2015	Mount Lemmon	Mount Lemmon Survey	·	1.1 km	MPC · JPL
842909	2016 AF_{179}	—	September 5, 2008	Kitt Peak	Spacewatch	EOS	1.5 km	MPC · JPL
842910	2016 AG_{179}	—	December 10, 2014	Mount Lemmon	Mount Lemmon Survey	·	3.1 km	MPC · JPL
842911	2016 AH_{185}	—	January 6, 2005	Catalina	CSS	·	2.8 km	MPC · JPL
842912	2016 AK_{185}	—	January 7, 2016	Haleakala	Pan-STARRS 1	·	530 m	MPC · JPL
842913	2016 AB_{186}	—	July 7, 2010	WISE	WISE	·	1.2 km	MPC · JPL
842914	2016 AJ_{186}	—	January 17, 2015	Haleakala	Pan-STARRS 1	·	2.4 km	MPC · JPL
842915	2016 AM_{189}	—	January 13, 2016	Haleakala	Pan-STARRS 1	·	2.4 km	MPC · JPL
842916	2016 AB_{192}	—	February 6, 2010	WISE	WISE	·	2.5 km	MPC · JPL
842917	2016 AX_{194}	—	January 8, 2011	Mount Lemmon	Mount Lemmon Survey	H	430 m	MPC · JPL
842918	2016 AB_{195}	—	January 10, 2016	Haleakala	Pan-STARRS 1	H	430 m	MPC · JPL
842919	2016 AZ_{197}	—	January 14, 2016	Haleakala	Pan-STARRS 1	H	370 m	MPC · JPL
842920	2016 AE_{199}	—	January 9, 2016	Haleakala	Pan-STARRS 1	H	430 m	MPC · JPL
842921	2016 AE_{200}	—	January 15, 2016	Haleakala	Pan-STARRS 1	H	330 m	MPC · JPL
842922	2016 AQ_{200}	—	January 14, 2010	Kitt Peak	Spacewatch	·	2.6 km	MPC · JPL
842923	2016 AV_{200}	—	February 12, 2000	Sacramento Peak	SDSS	·	2.5 km	MPC · JPL
842924	2016 AU_{202}	—	January 3, 2016	Haleakala	Pan-STARRS 1	·	880 m	MPC · JPL
842925	2016 AF_{204}	—	November 8, 2007	Kitt Peak	Spacewatch	V	450 m	MPC · JPL
842926	2016 AH_{206}	—	January 7, 2016	Haleakala	Pan-STARRS 1	critical	2.0 km	MPC · JPL
842927	2016 AZ_{207}	—	January 6, 2010	Mount Lemmon	Mount Lemmon Survey	LIX	2.5 km	MPC · JPL
842928	2016 AX_{208}	—	January 8, 2016	Haleakala	Pan-STARRS 1	·	760 m	MPC · JPL
842929	2016 AE_{211}	—	April 28, 2010	WISE	WISE	EUP	3.3 km	MPC · JPL
842930	2016 AL_{211}	—	December 28, 2002	Kitt Peak	Spacewatch	·	1.4 km	MPC · JPL
842931	2016 AR_{211}	—	December 17, 2009	Kitt Peak	Spacewatch	T_{j} (2.99)	2.9 km	MPC · JPL
842932	2016 AZ_{212}	—	January 15, 2010	Catalina	CSS	EUP	4.2 km	MPC · JPL
842933	2016 AB_{213}	—	April 13, 2010	WISE	WISE	·	2.5 km	MPC · JPL
842934	2016 AX_{213}	—	March 17, 2010	Mount Lemmon	Mount Lemmon Survey	·	3.6 km	MPC · JPL
842935	2016 AT_{214}	—	August 23, 2001	Anderson Mesa	LONEOS	·	3.0 km	MPC · JPL
842936	2016 AA_{215}	—	April 9, 2010	WISE	WISE	EUP	3.3 km	MPC · JPL
842937	2016 AN_{216}	—	February 4, 2005	Mount Lemmon	Mount Lemmon Survey	·	2.7 km	MPC · JPL
842938	2016 AK_{220}	—	April 19, 2010	WISE	WISE	·	3.6 km	MPC · JPL
842939	2016 AZ_{228}	—	October 10, 2008	Mount Lemmon	Mount Lemmon Survey	·	2.1 km	MPC · JPL
842940	2016 AE_{229}	—	October 27, 2008	Mount Lemmon	Mount Lemmon Survey	VER	2.5 km	MPC · JPL
842941	2016 AD_{230}	—	September 24, 2014	Mount Lemmon	Mount Lemmon Survey	·	2.1 km	MPC · JPL
842942	2016 AR_{232}	—	October 23, 2009	Mount Lemmon	Mount Lemmon Survey	·	1.4 km	MPC · JPL
842943	2016 AT_{232}	—	October 23, 2009	Mount Lemmon	Mount Lemmon Survey	·	1.8 km	MPC · JPL
842944	2016 AL_{235}	—	January 14, 2016	Haleakala	Pan-STARRS 1	·	760 m	MPC · JPL
842945	2016 AW_{238}	—	April 3, 2010	WISE	WISE	(895)	2.6 km	MPC · JPL
842946	2016 AW_{242}	—	December 18, 2015	Mount Lemmon	Mount Lemmon Survey	·	760 m	MPC · JPL
842947	2016 AJ_{243}	—	January 3, 2016	Haleakala	Pan-STARRS 1	·	1.9 km	MPC · JPL
842948	2016 AK_{246}	—	July 14, 2013	Haleakala	Pan-STARRS 1	·	2.5 km	MPC · JPL
842949	2016 AH_{248}	—	August 28, 2014	Haleakala	Pan-STARRS 1	·	1.1 km	MPC · JPL
842950	2016 AZ_{257}	—	August 8, 2013	Kitt Peak	Spacewatch	·	2.7 km	MPC · JPL
842951	2016 AP_{259}	—	August 14, 2013	Haleakala	Pan-STARRS 1	VER	2.0 km	MPC · JPL
842952	2016 AK_{260}	—	October 22, 2014	Catalina	CSS	·	2.5 km	MPC · JPL
842953	2016 AV_{264}	—	January 9, 2016	Haleakala	Pan-STARRS 1	·	1.8 km	MPC · JPL
842954	2016 AY_{264}	—	November 21, 2009	Mount Lemmon	Mount Lemmon Survey	·	1.8 km	MPC · JPL
842955	2016 AL_{266}	—	November 18, 2008	Kitt Peak	Spacewatch	·	2.7 km	MPC · JPL
842956	2016 AE_{267}	—	January 20, 2012	Haleakala	Pan-STARRS 1	·	950 m	MPC · JPL
842957	2016 AS_{269}	—	April 20, 2010	WISE	WISE	·	2.6 km	MPC · JPL
842958	2016 AS_{272}	—	November 20, 2014	Haleakala	Pan-STARRS 1	·	2.5 km	MPC · JPL
842959	2016 AZ_{276}	—	January 25, 2012	Haleakala	Pan-STARRS 1	EUN	860 m	MPC · JPL
842960	2016 AX_{278}	—	March 10, 2010	WISE	WISE	·	3.4 km	MPC · JPL
842961	2016 AK_{281}	—	January 12, 2016	Haleakala	Pan-STARRS 1	·	1.3 km	MPC · JPL
842962	2016 AC_{283}	—	January 3, 2016	Haleakala	Pan-STARRS 1	·	2.0 km	MPC · JPL
842963	2016 AD_{283}	—	January 7, 2016	Haleakala	Pan-STARRS 1	·	1.6 km	MPC · JPL
842964	2016 AF_{283}	—	January 3, 2016	Haleakala	Pan-STARRS 1	·	1.6 km	MPC · JPL
842965	2016 AR_{285}	—	January 3, 2016	Haleakala	Pan-STARRS 1	·	1.9 km	MPC · JPL
842966	2016 AW_{286}	—	January 8, 2016	Haleakala	Pan-STARRS 1	·	800 m	MPC · JPL
842967	2016 AO_{287}	—	March 3, 2010	WISE	WISE	·	2.4 km	MPC · JPL
842968	2016 AU_{294}	—	January 9, 2016	Haleakala	Pan-STARRS 1	H	380 m	MPC · JPL
842969	2016 AK_{295}	—	January 4, 2016	Haleakala	Pan-STARRS 1	·	2.7 km	MPC · JPL
842970	2016 AD_{296}	—	February 14, 2010	WISE	WISE	EUP	4.1 km	MPC · JPL
842971	2016 AG_{301}	—	January 14, 2016	Haleakala	Pan-STARRS 1	·	2.2 km	MPC · JPL
842972	2016 AW_{306}	—	January 4, 2016	Haleakala	Pan-STARRS 1	·	1.6 km	MPC · JPL
842973	2016 AG_{307}	—	January 12, 2016	Haleakala	Pan-STARRS 1	·	1.4 km	MPC · JPL
842974	2016 AY_{307}	—	January 11, 2016	Haleakala	Pan-STARRS 1	·	800 m	MPC · JPL
842975	2016 AC_{308}	—	January 4, 2016	Haleakala	Pan-STARRS 1	·	810 m	MPC · JPL
842976	2016 AG_{310}	—	January 11, 2016	Haleakala	Pan-STARRS 1	·	880 m	MPC · JPL
842977	2016 AJ_{311}	—	March 9, 2005	Mount Lemmon	Mount Lemmon Survey	·	690 m	MPC · JPL
842978	2016 AU_{311}	—	January 14, 2016	Haleakala	Pan-STARRS 1	·	510 m	MPC · JPL
842979	2016 AJ_{313}	—	January 14, 2016	Haleakala	Pan-STARRS 1	·	1.2 km	MPC · JPL
842980	2016 AF_{314}	—	January 14, 2016	Haleakala	Pan-STARRS 1	·	1.3 km	MPC · JPL
842981	2016 AO_{314}	—	January 8, 2016	Haleakala	Pan-STARRS 1	·	590 m	MPC · JPL
842982	2016 AU_{314}	—	September 28, 2009	Mount Lemmon	Mount Lemmon Survey	·	1.6 km	MPC · JPL
842983	2016 AW_{314}	—	December 14, 2010	Mount Lemmon	Mount Lemmon Survey	·	1.3 km	MPC · JPL
842984	2016 AT_{315}	—	January 14, 2016	Haleakala	Pan-STARRS 1	H	440 m	MPC · JPL
842985	2016 AJ_{316}	—	January 8, 2016	Haleakala	Pan-STARRS 1	·	1.6 km	MPC · JPL
842986	2016 AZ_{316}	—	January 12, 2016	Haleakala	Pan-STARRS 1	·	800 m	MPC · JPL
842987	2016 AX_{322}	—	December 16, 2015	Mount Lemmon	Mount Lemmon Survey	EOS	1.5 km	MPC · JPL
842988	2016 AT_{324}	—	January 4, 2016	Haleakala	Pan-STARRS 1	·	2.4 km	MPC · JPL
842989	2016 AY_{324}	—	January 12, 2016	Haleakala	Pan-STARRS 1	·	2.3 km	MPC · JPL
842990	2016 AC_{326}	—	January 9, 2016	Haleakala	Pan-STARRS 1	T_{j} (2.98)	1.9 km	MPC · JPL
842991	2016 AH_{330}	—	January 8, 2016	Haleakala	Pan-STARRS 1	EOS	1.4 km	MPC · JPL
842992	2016 AD_{331}	—	January 3, 2016	Mount Lemmon	Mount Lemmon Survey	KON	1.6 km	MPC · JPL
842993	2016 AL_{338}	—	January 4, 2016	Haleakala	Pan-STARRS 1	·	2.3 km	MPC · JPL
842994	2016 AN_{352}	—	January 4, 2016	Haleakala	Pan-STARRS 1	L5	6.8 km	MPC · JPL
842995	2016 AG_{355}	—	January 13, 2016	Mount Lemmon	Mount Lemmon Survey	·	440 m	MPC · JPL
842996	2016 AK_{365}	—	January 4, 2016	Haleakala	Pan-STARRS 1	EOS	1.3 km	MPC · JPL
842997	2016 AW_{383}	—	September 21, 1999	Uccle	T. Pauwels	·	1.6 km	MPC · JPL
842998	2016 AV_{387}	—	March 1, 2012	Mount Lemmon	Mount Lemmon Survey	·	1.0 km	MPC · JPL
842999	2016 AD_{391}	—	January 2, 2016	Mount Lemmon	Mount Lemmon Survey	·	2.0 km	MPC · JPL
843000	2016 BG_{3}	—	January 29, 2011	Kitt Peak	Spacewatch	·	1.7 km	MPC · JPL

back to top
