= Bitter Springs =

Bitter Springs can refer to:

== Places ==
- Bitter Springs in Elsey National Park, Northern Territory, Australia
- Bitter Springs, Arizona, a native village in Arizona
- Bitter Springs Group, a fossil locality in the Northern Territory, Australia
  - Bitter Springs anomaly

== Other uses ==
- The Bitter Springs, English rock group
- Bitter Springs (film), a 1950 film directed by Ralph Smart
- Bitter Springs type preservation, preservation of microorganisms in silica

== See also ==
- Bitter Spring Expedition, 1860 U.S. Army expedition
- Bitter Spring Valley, a valley in southeast Nevada, U.S.
