= Nysa–Polana complex =

Group of overlapping asteroid families

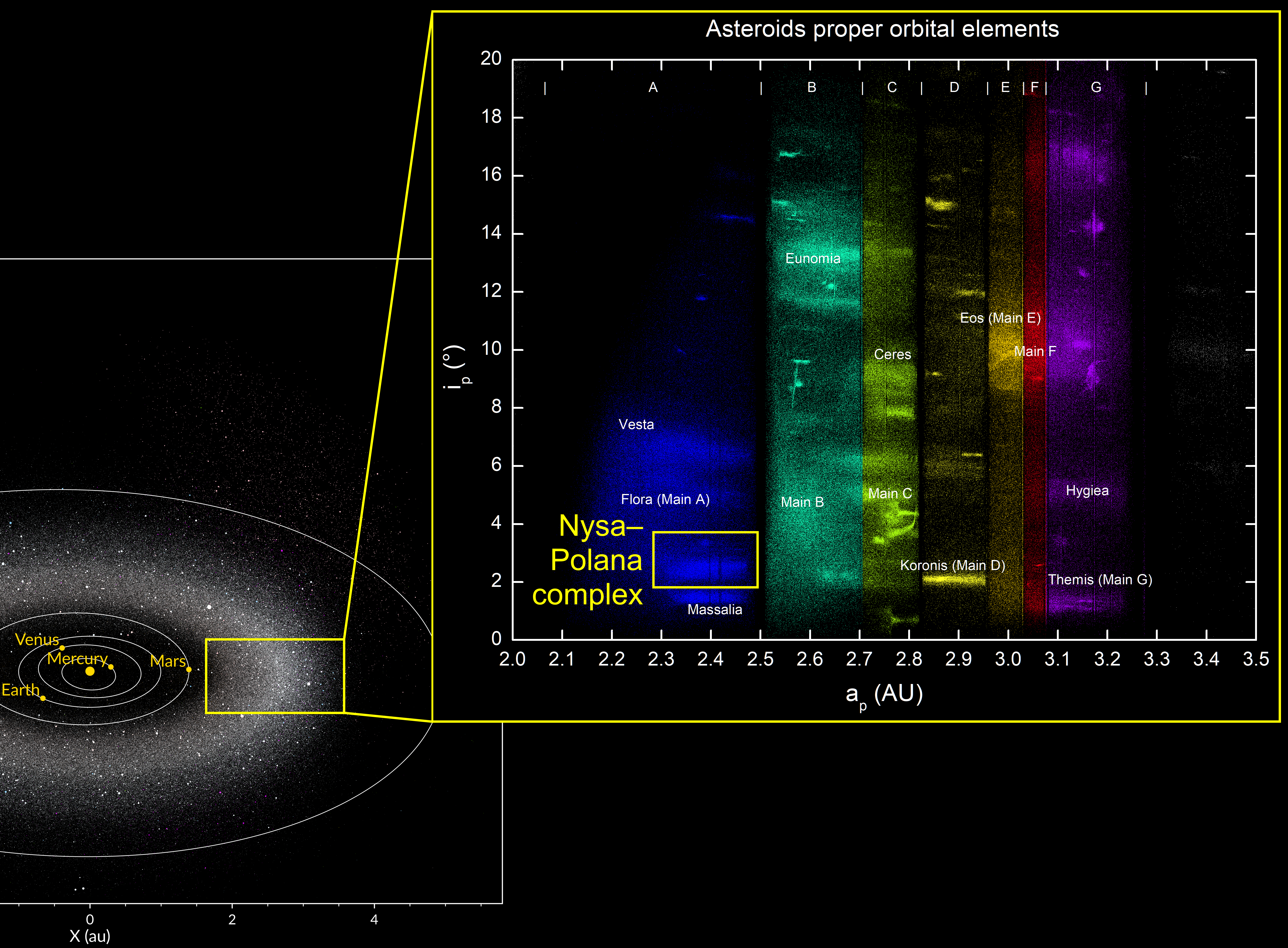
Diagram showing the location of the Nysa–Polana complex (inside yellow box) in the main asteroid belt, with an inset graph plotting the proper semi-major axes and inclinations of asteroids.

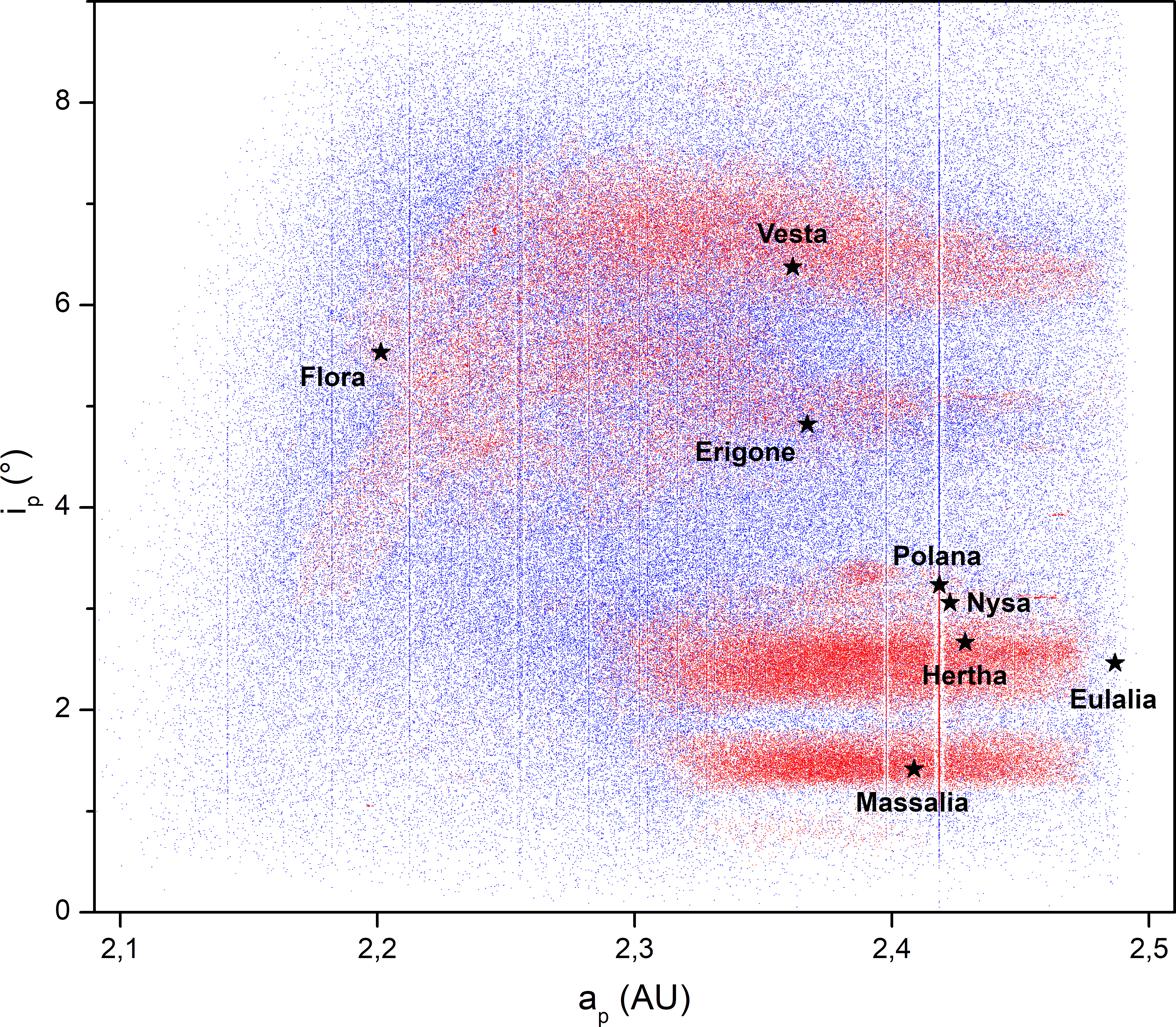
Inner main-belt asteroids plotted by proper semi-major axis (a_{p}) vs. inclination (i_{p}), with their families highlighted in red.

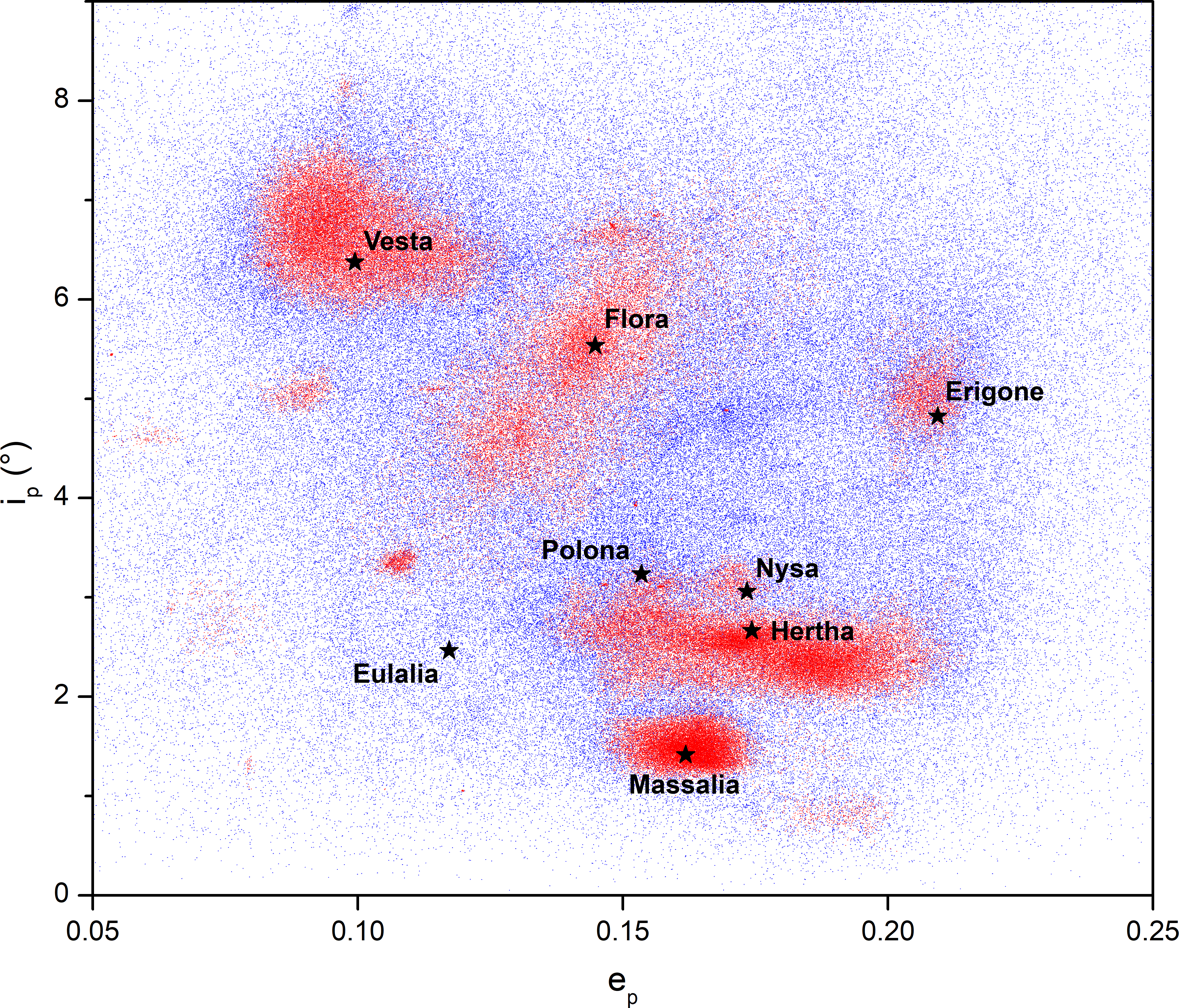
Same as left, but plotted by proper eccentricity (e_{p}) vs. proper inclination (i_{p}).

The Nysa–Polana complex contains Nysa, Polana, Hertha, Eulalia, and their respective families at low inclinations between 2° and 4°.

The Nysa–Polana complex (also known as the Nysa–Polana family, Nysa–Polana clan, or Nysa–Polana–Hertha complex) is a group of overlapping asteroid families in the low-inclination region of the inner main asteroid belt. In terms of proper orbital elements, asteroids in this complex orbit the Sun at semi-major axes approximately between 2.3 and 2.5 astronomical units (AU), with low orbital inclinations between 2° and 4° and eccentricities between 0.1 and 0.2. The complex was first identified in the 1950s and has undergone various interpretations until the 2000s, when astronomical surveys began distinguishing the physical properties of its members for the first time.

As of 2026, the Nysa–Polana complex contains over 38,600 known asteroids. The complex is broadly divided into low-albedo and high-albedo populations, each consisting of distinct families named after their largest members. The low-albedo population, sometimes known as the Polana–Eulalia complex, comprises the New Polana and Eulalia families and contains carbonaceous asteroids with spectral types C, B, and F. The New Polana family (Note: Named to distinguish it from the historical "Polana family", a term for all dark asteroids in the complex; not referring to the family's dynamical age) formed from an asteroid collision 1.40±0.15 billion years ago, whereas the Eulalia family formed from a more recent asteroid collision 865 million years ago. The high-albedo population consists of S-type and X-type asteroids plausibly associated with 135 Hertha and is thought to have formed from one or two collisions less than 1 billion years ago. Although the Nysa–Polana complex bears the name of 44 Nysa, the asteroid is generally considered an interloper unrelated to the complex due to its differing composition.

Over millions to billions of years, asteroids in the Nysa–Polana complex may migrate to unstable orbital resonances via the Yarkovsky effect. These resonances significantly elongate the orbits of asteroids within a few million years, allowing them to come near Earth. Because of this, the Nysa–Polana complex has been identified as a source of low-inclination near-Earth asteroids and meteoroids. The carbonaceous CI chondrites and near-Earth asteroids 101955 Bennu and 162173 Ryugu are believed to have come from the Polana–Eulalia complex, while the stony L chondrites are believed to have come from the Nysa–Polana complex's S-type population.

== History of studies ==
The Nysa–Polana complex was first identified as an asteroid family in 1951 by Dirk Brouwer, who noted that 44 Nysa, 135 Hertha, 142 Polana, and six other asteroids shared similar proper orbital elements. Brouwer assigned the identification number "24" to this family, while a 1969 study by James R. Arnold assigned the label "A-74". During this time, the Palomar–Leiden Survey discovered numerous small asteroids within the vicinity of Brouwer's purported family, revealing it to be an aggregation of several neighboring unrelated families. Thus in 1971, Bertil A. Lindblad and R. B. Southworth proposed that the family should be split into the Nysa and Hertha families. However, few asteroids in these proposed families had known colors and compositions, which raised the question of whether the Nysa and Hertha families truly originated from their namesakes, and whether the two families shared the same origin.

In 1982, E. F. Tedesco and colleagues analyzed the colors and albedos of asteroids in Lindblad and Southworth's proposed Nysa family and found that they were mostly F-type asteroids, unlike Nysa. This led Jeffrey F. Bell to argue in 1989 that these asteroids belonged to Polana instead of Nysa, which he labeled an interloper. In 1995, Vincenzo Zappalà and colleagues found that this family was actually two overlapping families (which does not include Hertha), which he dubbed a "complex clan" associated with Nysa. In response to this, Alberto Cellino and colleagues measured the spectra of multiple asteroids in this proposed clan and found that none matched Nysa's spectral type. They proposed in a 2001 study that the Nysa–Polana clan contains an S-type Mildred family (renamed from the Hertha family) and a F-type Polana family, neither of which share a common origin. Further observations and analyses by 2012 revealed that these families are divided into two clusters in terms of proper eccentricity and contain a mix of S-, X-, and C-type asteroids, leading various studies to reassign the families' names.

The development of large asteroid surveys in the early 2000s provided the data needed to reassess the structure of the Nysa–Polana complex. Color measurements from the Sloan Digital Sky Survey and albedo measurements from the Wide-field Infrared Survey Explorer revealed a clear separation between low- and high-albedo asteroids in the region. In 2013, Kevin J. Walsh and colleagues identified the low-albedo population as two distinct collisional families associated with Polana and Eulalia. Two years later, Melissa J. Dykhuis and Richard Greenberg demonstrated that the high-albedo population could also be divided into separate S-type and X-type groups associated with Hertha, establishing the modern interpretation of the Nysa–Polana complex as a collection of orbitally overlapping but compositionally distinct asteroid families.

=== Nomenclature ===
In the scientific literature, the complex is commonly referred to as the "Nysa–Polana complex" and sometimes as the "Nysa–Polana family" or "Nysa–Polana clan". While the "family" and "clan" descriptors originated from studies prior to the early 2000s, the widely-adopted "complex" descriptor became commonplace after the late 2000s. The complex owes its primary name to the two most prominent asteroids historically associated with the region, 44 Nysa and 142 Polana. However, the inclusion of Nysa in this complex is obsolete, as it is now known to be an interloper with an unrelated composition. While most studies continue including Nysa's name nonetheless, some studies have called the complex the "Nysa–Polana–Hertha complex" or the "Hertha clan", in recognition of 135 Hertha which is now considered the parent of the complex's population of high-albedo asteroids.

In modern studies, the names Polana, Eulalia, Nysa, and Hertha are commonly used to describe the subpopulations and families within the Nysa–Polana complex. The names Polana and Eulalia unambiguously refer to two distinct families in the complex's population of low-albedo asteroids, which may be collectively referred to as the "Polana–Eulalia complex". On the other hand, the names of Nysa and Hertha are used interchangeably and may either refer to both or one of the asteroid spectral types in the high-albedo population.

The nomenclature of the Nysa–Polana complex's subpopulations has evolved with researchers' understanding of their nature, as shown in the table below:

History of Nysa–Polana complex subpopulation names (Note: All information in this table, with the exception of Bottke et al. (2026) on the far left, is sourced from Table A.1 of Marsset et al. (2026) and Table 1 of Dykhuis & Greenberg (2015). References are abbreviated for clarity.)
Reference	2026 (Bot)	2026 (Mar)	2025	2024 (Nes)	2024 (Mar)	2024 (Bro)	2015 (Nes)	2015 (Mas)	2015 (D&G)	2014	2013	2005	2001	1995	1989	1979	1977
C-type family	New; Polana	Polana	Polana	Polana		Polana	Polana	(New); Polana	Polana	Polana	New; Polana	McCuskey	Polana	Polana	Polana	W-24	Nysa
C-type family	Eulalia	Eulalia	Eulalia			Eulalia	Eulalia	Eulalia	Eulalia1		Eulalia	McCuskey	Polana	Polana	Polana	W-24	Nysa
C-type family	Eulalia	Eulalia	Eulalia			Eulalia	Eulalia	Eulalia	Eulalia2		Iphigenia?	McCuskey	Polana	Polana	Polana	W-24	Nysa
S-type family	Hertha	Nysa_{S}	Hertha	Nysa	Nysa	Nysa	Nysa (405)	Nysa; Hertha	Hertha1	Burdett		Mildred; Hertha	Mildred	Nysa	Hertha	W-160	Hertha
X-type family		Hertha	Hertha_{2}	Hertha		Hertha			Hertha2			Hertha					

== Orbital dynamics ==
As with other asteroid families, the orbits of asteroids in the Nysa–Polana complex are ideally described using proper orbital elements, which average out short-term variations caused by gravitational perturbations. Because these elements remain relatively stable over long periods, asteroid families can be identified as clusters in proper semi-major axis, eccentricity, and inclination. In terms of these proper orbital elements, asteroids in the Nysa–Polana complex orbit the Sun at semi-major axes approximately between 2.3 and 2.5 astronomical units (AU), with low orbital inclinations between 2° and 4° and eccentricities between 0.1 and 0.2.

Over time periods of millions of years, gravitational perturbations and non-gravitational forces can continuously modify the proper orbital elements of asteroids. These processes gradually disperse collisional families and can even transport asteroids into near-Earth space.

=== Yarkovsky effect ===
All asteroids in the Nysa–Polana complex experience gradual changes in their semi-major axes due to the Yarkovsky effect, a non-gravitational thermal force produced by the asteroid unevenly re-emitting absorbed sunlight. The Yarkovsky effect increases or decreases an asteroid's semi-major axis depending on the direction of its spin: prograde-spinning asteroids drift outward, whereas retrograde-spinning asteroids drift inward. Because the strength of this force is inversely proportional to an asteroid's diameter, smaller asteroids experience larger changes in semi-major axis than larger asteroids. Over millions to billions of years, this process disperses asteroid families and gives them V-shaped distributions when plotting by proper semi-major axis versus size (or absolute magnitude). These distributions have been used to identify and distinguish the collisional families within the Nysa–Polana complex and to estimate their ages.

=== Mean-motion resonances ===
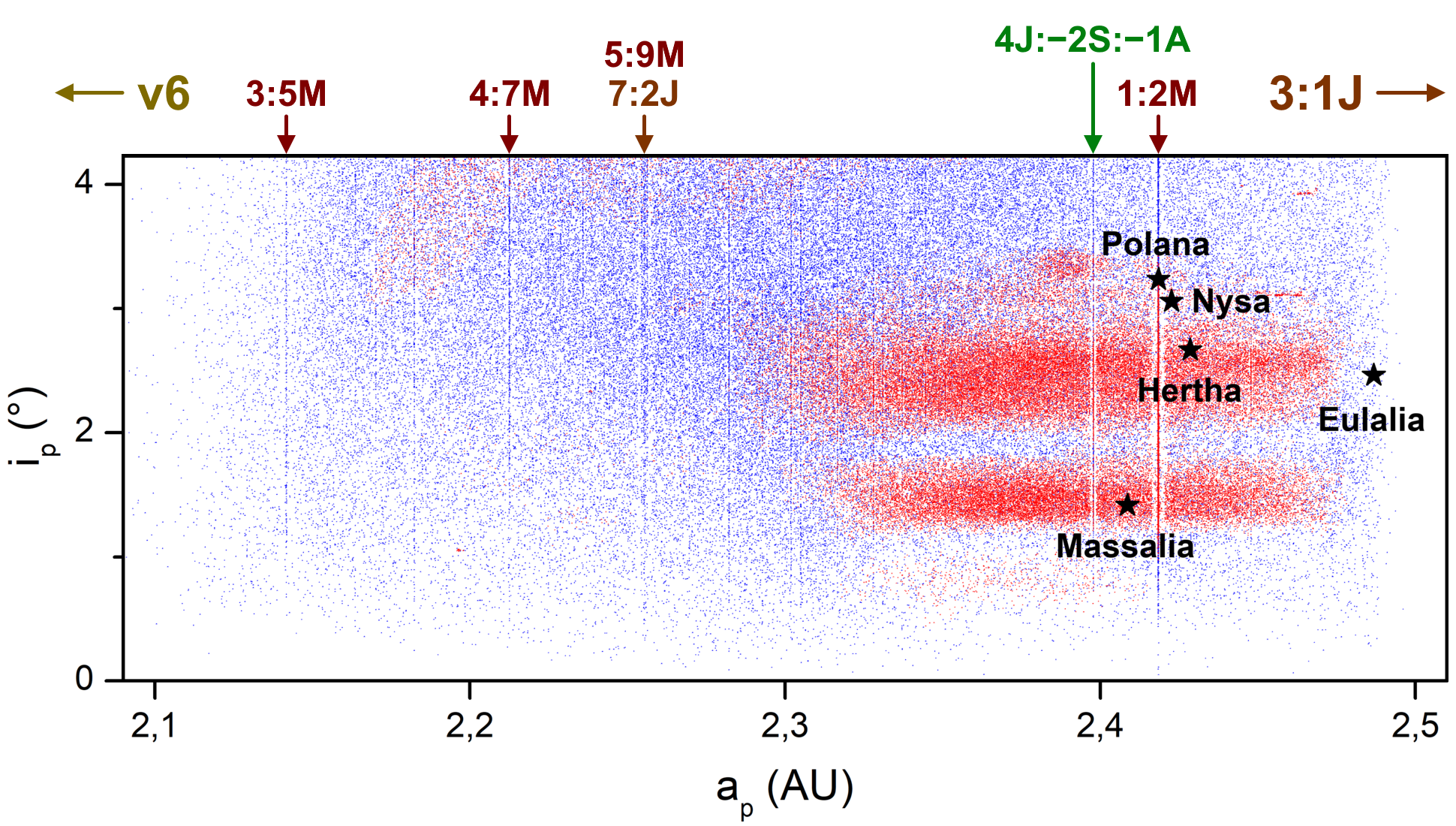
The Nysa–Polana region (red; above the Massalia family) plotted by proper semi-major axis (a_{p}) and proper inclination (i_{p}), with major orbital resonances labeled above.

The Yarkovsky effect may bring an asteroid to a mean-motion resonance at a specific semi-major axis, where its orbital period becomes commensurable with (becomes an exact ratio of) that of a planet. During these resonances, gravitational perturbations are repeatedly applied at nearly the same orbital configuration, allowing their effects to accumulate over time. Depending on the resonance, these perturbations can alter an asteroid's semi-major axis, eccentricity, and inclination, destabilize its orbit, or remove it from the asteroid belt entirely. The strongest mean-motion resonances generally involve simple ("low order") orbital period ratios between two bodies–the asteroid and planet.

The most significant mean-motion resonance affecting the Nysa–Polana complex is Jupiter's 3:1 resonance, which located at the semi-major axis of approximately 2.50 AU. This resonance forms a Kirkwood gap at the outer boundary of the inner main belt, separating the Nysa–Polana complex from asteroid populations at larger semi-major axes. Asteroids near this resonance exhibit substantial oscillations in eccentricity, as seen in the Nysa–Polana complex member 495 Eulalia. On the other hand, asteroids entering the resonance experience rapid increases in orbital eccentricity and end up getting removed from the resonance in less than 100 million years. Asteroids ejected by the 3:1 resonance with Jupiter may end up on Earth-crossing orbits.

The 1:2 mean-motion resonance with Mars, located near 2.42 AU, intersects the Nysa–Polana complex and produces weaker but more persistent perturbations than Jupiter's 3:1 resonance. Rather than rapidly ejecting asteroids from the main belt, the resonance gradually modifies the asteroid's proper orbital elements, depending on its eccentricity. For asteroids with proper eccentricities below 0.2, the 1:2 mean-motion resonance with Mars causes the proper eccentricity to oscillate over at least a million years, as seen in 142 Polana, one of the Nysa–Polana complex's largest members. For asteroids with proper eccentricities above 0.2, the resonance chaotically disperses their proper orbital elements. This chaotic diffusion occurs due to several other weak mean-motion resonances overlapping Mars's 1:2 resonance. (Note: Gallardo et al. (2011) list the names, semi-major axes, and strengths of mean-motion resonances overlapping Mars's 1:2 resonance in Table 3. These include: The 19:6 resonance with Jupiter ($19\lambda_J - 6\lambda$) at 2.4116 AU; The 4:15 resonance with Earth ($-4\lambda_E + 15\lambda$) at 2.4137 AU; The 22:7 resonance with Jupiter ($22\lambda_J - 7\lambda$) at 2.4237 AU; The 5:19 resonance with Earth ($-5\lambda_E + 19\lambda$) at 2.4351 AU; These resonances are more than a million times weaker than Mars's 1:2 resonance at low eccentricities of 0.15, but increase in strength by 2 to 3 orders of magnitude at the higher eccentricity of 0.25. The three-body mean-motion resonance involving Mars and Neptune ($3n_M + n_N - 6n {{=}} 0$) also occurs at 2.4125 AU.) Due to the Yarkovsky effect, asteroids can escape Mars's 1:2 mean-motion resonance.

=== Three-body and secular resonances ===
In addition to the aforementioned mean-motion resonances, which involve only two bodies, the Nysa–Polana complex is crossed by several three-body mean-motion resonances involving Jupiter, Saturn, and the asteroid itself. A 2010 study by Michtchenko et al. has identified the 4J:−2S:−1A resonance near 2.40 AU as one of the most significant three-body mean-motion resonances affecting the region. (Note: See Figure 3 of Michtchenko et al. (2010), which shows a vertical line (labeled "7") near 2.40 AU. The line labeled "7" contains the 4J:−2S:−1A resonance, which is stated in Table 1.) Although these resonances are weaker than the major two-body resonances, they contribute to the long-term diffusion of asteroid orbits and may influence the observed distribution of asteroid families.

Asteroids migrating through the inner main belt may also encounter secular resonances, which differ from mean-motion resonances in that they affect asteroids over a continuous range of orbital elements rather than at specific semi-major axes. Secular resonances arise when the precession frequencies of an asteroid's orbit become synchronized with those of a planet. In the inner asteroid belt, the strongest secular resonance is the ν_{6} resonance, which occurs when an asteroid's perihelion precesses at the same rate as Saturn's. Like the 3:1 mean-motion resonance with Jupiter, the ν_{6} resonance can drive asteroids onto Earth-crossing orbits within 10 million years. Although the Nysa–Polana complex's inclination lies below the region where the ν_{6} resonance occurs, the Yarkovsky effect can bring asteroids into this resonance by transporting them to the main belt's inner edge at 2.1 to 2.2 AU. The Nysa–Polana region is also crossed by several other weak secular resonances, which are thought to slowly disperse asteroids. (Note: Groups of secular resonances crossing the Nysa–Polana region include s-2, gs-2, g-2, and g-1, as shown in Figure 6 of Michtchenko et al. (2010). The letter "g" indicates apsidal precession, while the letter "s" indicates nodal precession. Specific secular resonances in these groups are listed in Table 2 of that paper; the numerical subscripts of the precession frequency ν indicate the planet involved.)

== Subdivision ==
As of 2026, the Nysa–Polana complex contains over 38,600 known members. The complex was historically regarded as a single asteroid family, but modern studies have shown that it consists of several overlapping asteroid families with distinct compositions and collisional histories. Analyses of proper orbital elements, visible colors, and albedos have revealed that the complex contains both primitive low-albedo populations and high-albedo populations that cannot be explained by a single parent body. As a result, the region is now interpreted as a superposition of multiple unrelated asteroid families rather than a single group.

Proper orbital elements (semi-major axis vs. inclination) of the Nysa–Polana complex, with each asteroid represented as a circle scaled by diameter and color-coded by albedo. Names of large asteroids are shown. Asteroids appear concentrated along vertical lines due to mean-motion resonances with other planets, as labeled above.

Proper orbital elements (eccentricity vs. inclination) of the Nysa–Polana complex, with each asteroid represented as a circle scaled by diameter and color-coded by albedo. Low-albedo asteroids are clustered near Polana, while moderate-albedo asteroids are clustered near Hertha. Nysa does not have a cluster of high-albedo asteroids.

=== Low-albedo population (Polana–Eulalia complex) ===
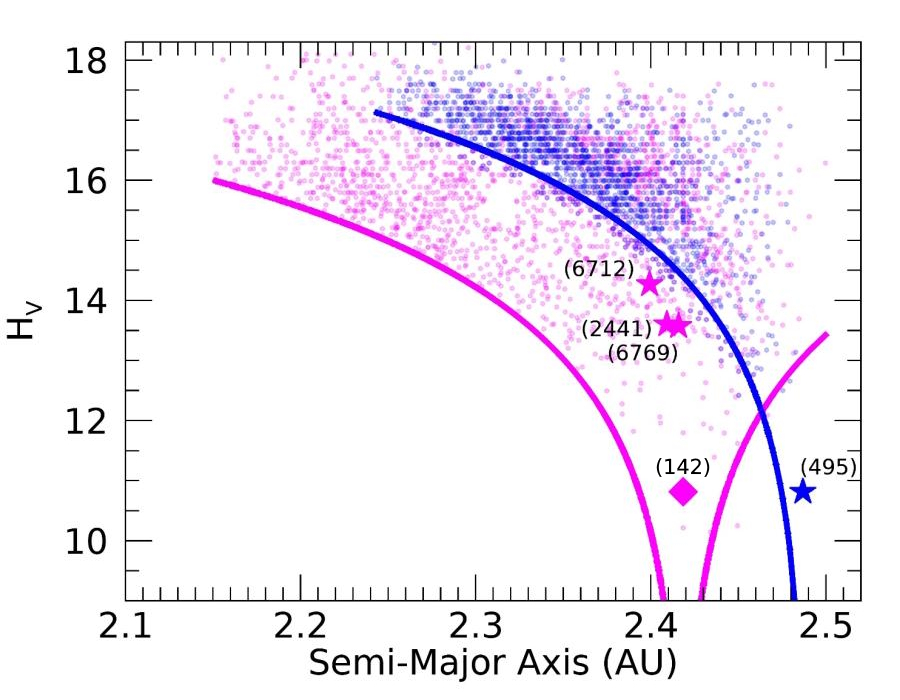
Polana (pink) and Eulalia (blue) families plotted by proper semi-major axis and absolute magnitude (H_{V}). Both families show V-shaped distributions centered on their largest members, due to the Yarkovsky effect increasingly spreading out members at smaller sizes (higher H_{V}). Both families are cut off beyond 2.5 AU due to the 3:1 resonance with Jupiter.

The low-albedo population consists of carbonaceous asteroids with spectral types C and its subtypes B and F, whose albedos are less than 0.1. These asteroids were once grouped together with the brighter asteroids of the Nysa–Polana complex, but have since been disentangled through color, albedo, and spectroscopic measurements. Modern studies show that the low-albedo component itself contains at least two distinct collisional families associated with 495 Eulalia and 142 Polana. For this reason, the low-albedo population is sometimes known as the "Polana–Eulalia complex". Both families are plausible sources of CI chondrite meteorites and carbonaceous near-Earth asteroids like 101955 Bennu and 162173 Ryugu, which are known to gradually drift closer to the Sun due to the Yarkovsky effect and ν_{6} secular resonance.

==== New Polana family ====
The New Polana family is an ancient population of low-albedo asteroids associated with 142 Polana, an F- or B-type asteroid 55 km (34 mi) in diameter. The existence and name of this family was coined in 2013 by Walsh et al. to distinguish it from the younger Eulalia family and from the historical use of the term "Polana family" for the entire low-albedo population. Despite the latter reason, some studies still call the New Polana family the "Polana family".

The New Polana family contains over 2,000 known members as of 2023. The family's asteroids are widely dispersed, which suggests it is very old and has undergone significant orbital evolution due to resonances and Yarkovsky drift. The 1:2 mean-motion orbital resonance with Mars, which contains Polana at 2.42 AU, is especially thought to have contributed to the spreading of the New Polana family. A 2015 study by Bottke et al. estimates that the New Polana family formed 1.40±0.15 billion years ago, likely as a result of a catastrophic collision on a once-larger parent body.

==== Eulalia family ====
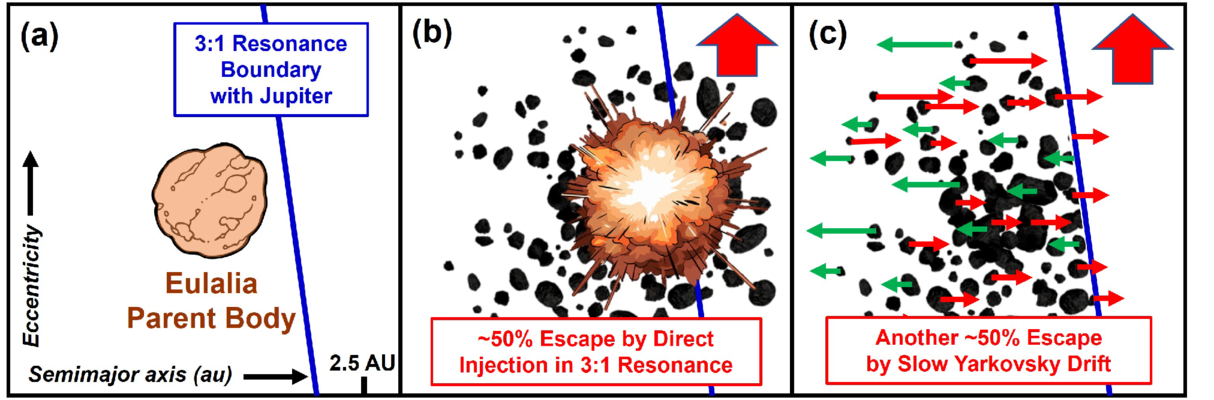
Schematic illustrating the evolutionary stages of the Eulalia family. (a) The Eulalia parent body resides near the Jupiter 3:1 mean-motion resonance (J3:1). (b) The parent body gets destroyed, with approximately 50% of fragments getting ejected by J3:1. (c) Another 50% of surviving fragments eventually migrate toward J3:1 via Yarkovsky effect.

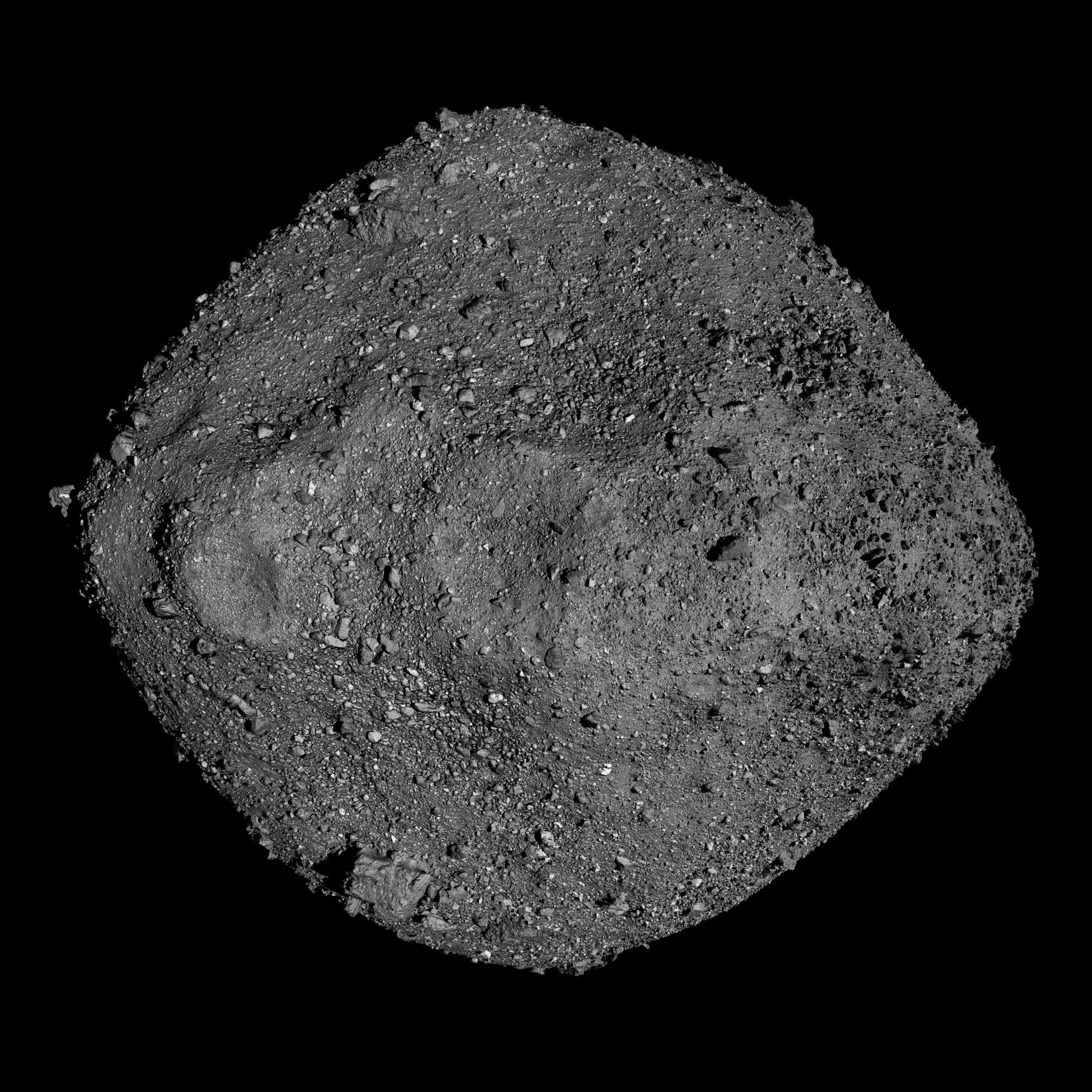
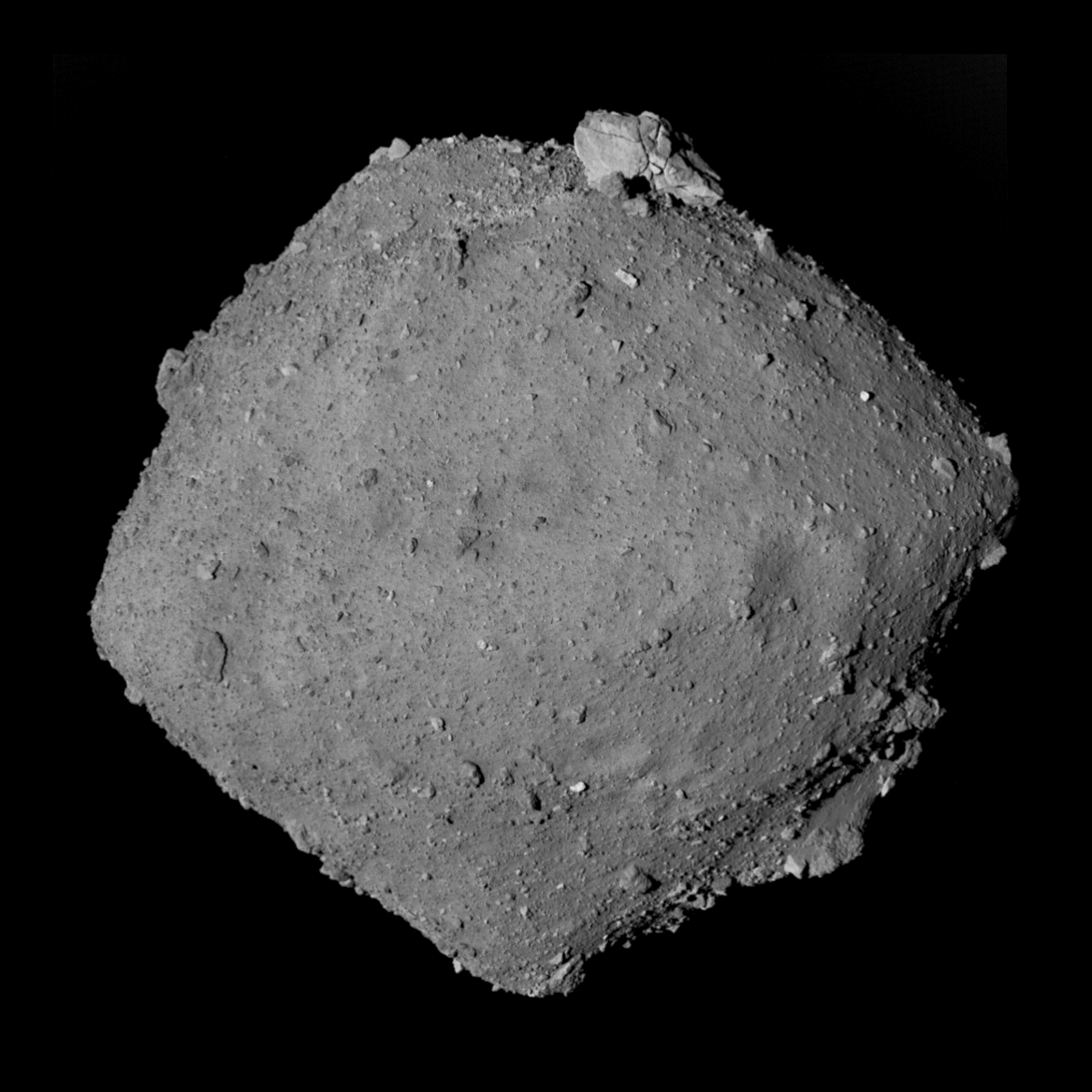
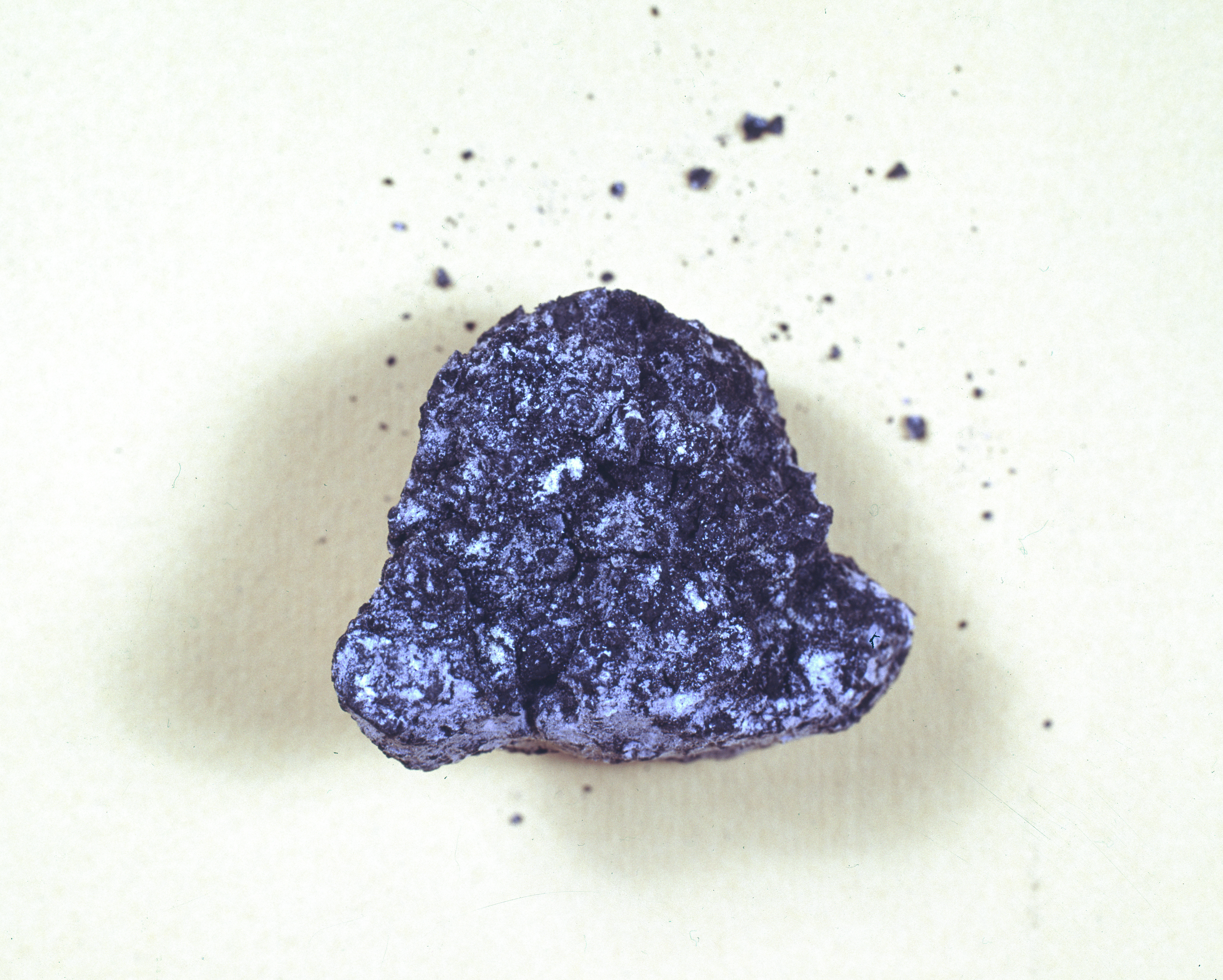
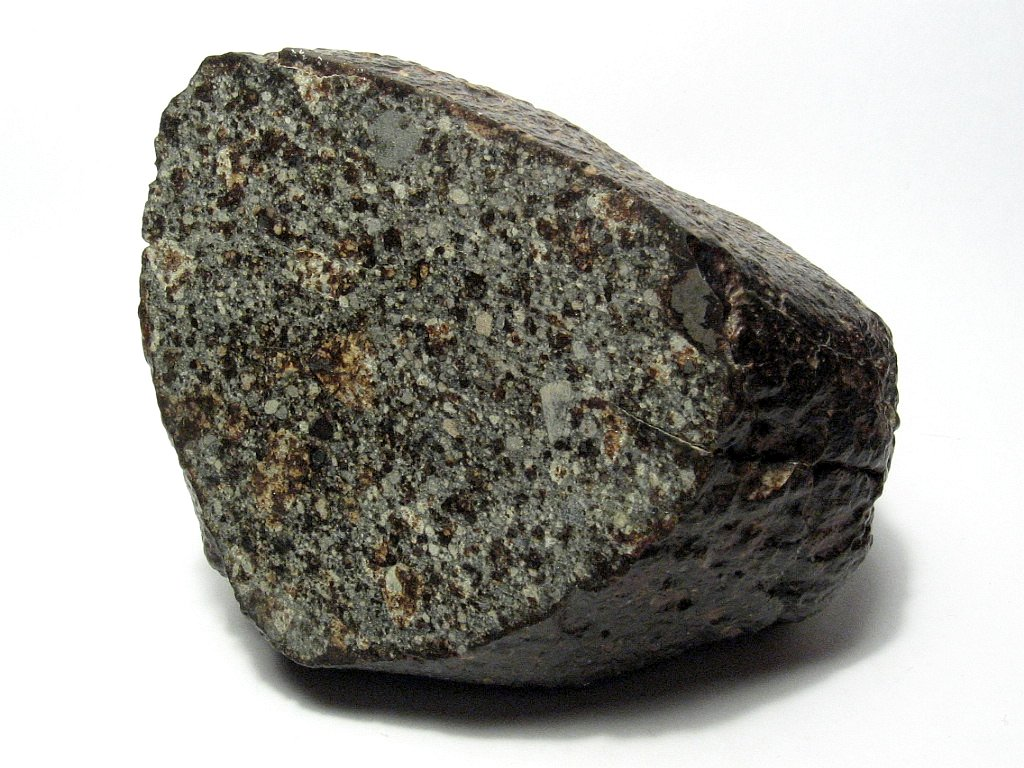
The Nysa–Polana complex is believed to be the source of (clockwise from upper left): Bennu, Ryugu, and many L and CI chondrites.

The Eulalia family is a younger low-albedo asteroid family associated with 495 Eulalia, a C-type asteroid 37 km (23 mi) in diameter. It contains over 1,600 known members as of 2023. When plotted by proper semi-major axis, the Eulalia family appears cut off at the inner boundary of the 3:1 mean-motion resonance with Jupiter at 2.5 AU. A 2015 study has suggested that the Eulalia family might comprise two overlapping families, although later studies still discuss it as single family.

Before 2013, Eulalia had not been recognized as the parent body of a distinct family because its proper eccentricity lies outside the range expected for many neighboring asteroids (Eulalia has e_{p}=0.12 compared to its family's average e_{p}=0.145). Walsh et al. first showed in 2013 that Eulalia's orbit—especially its proper eccentricity—varies greatly due to the nearby 3:1 mean-motion orbital resonance with Jupiter, as well as a three-body secular resonance involving the apsidal precession of itself, Jupiter, and Saturn ($g+g_{5}-2g_{6}$). (Note: The linear combination $g+g_{5}-2g_{6}$ means that the summed apsidal precession frequencies of the asteroid g and Jupiter g_{5} are synchronized with (equal to) twice of Saturn's apsidal precession frequency g_{6}.)

The Eulalia family is thought to have formed about 865 million years ago, from the collisional disruption of a 100 to 200 km (62 to 124 mi)-diameter parent body near the inner boundary of the 3:1 mean-motion resonance with Jupiter. Approximately half of the ejected fragments were launched toward the 3:1 Jupiter resonance, which resulted in rapid destabilization of their orbits. The surviving half, launched interior to the 3:1 resonance, underwent gradual Yarkovsky drift where half migrated inward and the other half migrated outward. Over tens to hundreds of millions of years, the outward-migrating fragments eventually reached the 3:1 Jupiter resonance and became eliminated. This left roughly 25% of the original population of fragments surviving as the present-day Eulalia family.

A 2026 study by Bottke et al. suggested that the formation of the Eulalia family caused an impact shower within the inner Solar System. They cited multiple lines of evidence from past studies on Earth's moon:

1. A 2009 study by Zellner et al. identified numerous microscopic beads of impact glass in lunar rock samples from the Apollo program. Argon–argon dating found that many of these beads were 800 Myr old, irrespective of their composition.
2. A 2020 study by Terada et al. noticed that lunar craters larger than 20 km (12 mi) in diameter tend to be approximately 800 Myr old, suggesting that they formed during an impact shower at the time.

Bottke et al. ran simulations of the Eulalia family's formation and found that the rate and size of lunar impacts match the aforementioned lunar crater evidence. The researchers additionally noted that the Eulalia family's formation coincided with major changes in Earth's biosphere during its Neoproterozoic era (such as the Bitter Springs anomaly and Sturtian glaciation) and a spike in volcanic activity on Mars, suggesting a possible relation between these events.

=== High-albedo population ===
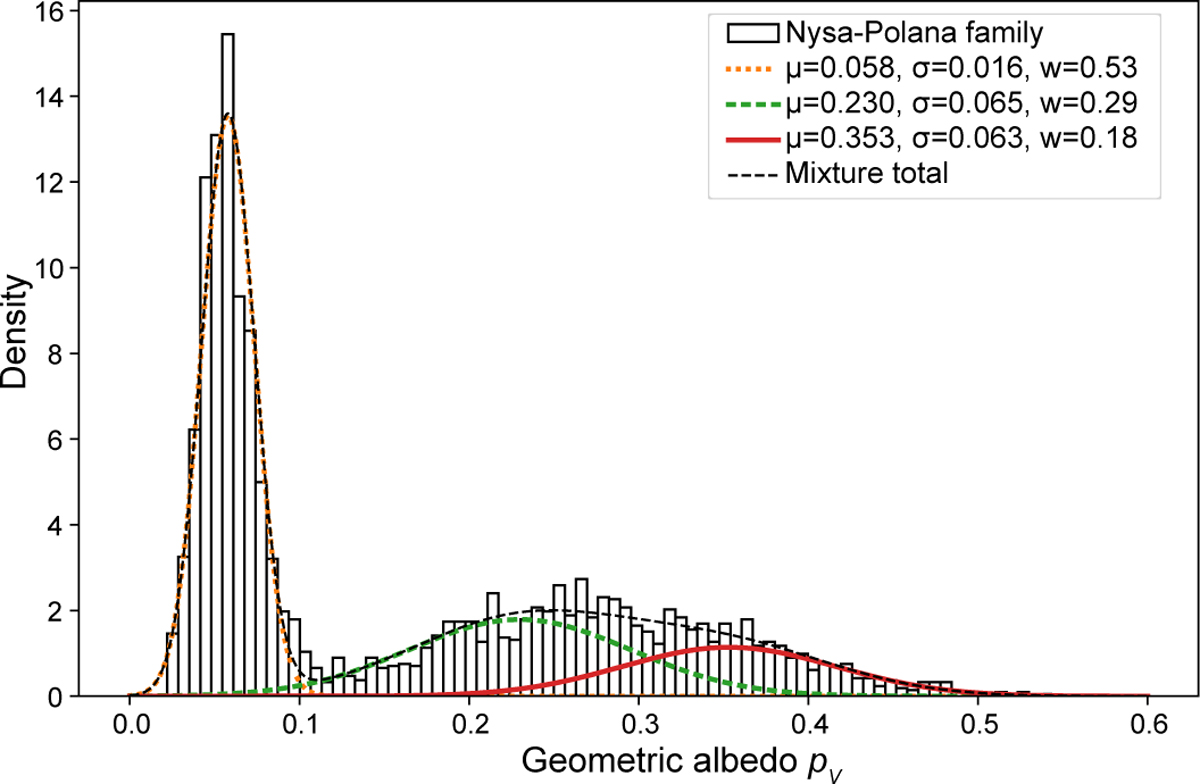
Histogram showing the bimodal distribution of asteroid geometric albedos in the Nysa–Polana complex. The high-albedo (p_{V}>0.1) population may contain an intermediate albedo group (green curve) and a higher albedo group (red curve).

The high-albedo population of the Nysa–Polana complex consists primarily of S-type and X-type asteroids, whose albedos are generally greater than 0.1. Although these asteroids were historically treated as a single population, analyses combining spectral classifications, proper orbital elements, and Yarkovsky-driven orbital evolution have suggested that they represent at least two distinct collisional families. These families were first distinguished by Dykhuis and Greenberg in 2015 and are thought to be associated with the 79 km (49 mi)-diameter asteroid 135 Hertha. However, the relationship between Hertha and the surrounding asteroids remains uncertain because Hertha itself is classified as an M- or X-type asteroid, whereas the largest family in the region is dominated by S-type asteroids.

The names used for the high-albedo population have varied between studies. Earlier investigations often referred to the population as the "Nysa family", because 44 Nysa is the most prominent high-albedo asteroid in the region and was originally thought to be related to the surrounding asteroids. Subsequent studies showed that Nysa is compositionally distinct and have thus labeled it as an interloper. More recent studies have therefore favored associating the high-albedo population with Hertha, although the historical name "Nysa family" remains common in the literature.

==== S-type asteroids ====
The overlapping S-type (Hertha1; blue) and X-type (Hertha2; yellow) families plotted by proper semi-major axis and absolute magnitude (H_{V}). Both families show V-shaped distributions centered near Hertha, due to the Yarkovsky effect increasingly spreading out members at smaller sizes (higher H_{V}).

The largest high-albedo population in the Nysa–Polana complex consists of S-type asteroids, which are thought to be associated with 135 Hertha. For this reason, it may be referred to as the "Hertha family", although some studies continue using the historical term "Nysa family". Asteroids in the S-type family have diameters smaller than 10 km (6.2 mi) (Note: Jenniskens & Devillepoix (2025) say "size" instead of diameter. The authors have used the word "diameter" but never "radius" when describing asteroid sizes in their paper, so it can be assumed that "size" means "diameter" here.) and have albedos averaging around 0.25. It may represent an intermediate-albedo component of the Nysa–Polana complex.

Compared to the low-albedo population of the Nysa–Polana complex, the S-type family is concentrated at higher proper eccentricities between 0.14 and 0.22 and at lower proper inclinations between 2° and 3°. (Note: Proper orbital element ranges for the S-type family are plotted in Figures 1 and 3 and stated in page 204 of Dykhuis & Greenberg (2015). Note that inclination is given as its sine (to convert from sin(i) to i, plug in the value into arcsine).) Based on the S-type family's Yarkovsky spread, a 2025 study by Ciocco et al. estimated that it formed from a collision 750±100 million years ago. On the other hand, an earlier 2015 study by Dykhuis and Greenberg estimated a younger age of 300+60
−50 million years. A 2026 study by Marsset et al. estimated that the S-type family's parent body had a diameter of 90 ± 23 km (56 ± 14 mi).

The S-type family is believed to be one of the sources of L chondrites, a common type of stony meteorite with intermediate amounts of iron. L chondrites have compositions and low orbital inclinations matching those of the S-type family, and were likely delivered through the ν_{6} and Jovian 3:1 resonances bordering the family. A 2026 study by Ciocco et al. noted that compositionally identical L chondrites have been observed to have different impact ages, and therefore proposed that the S-type family formed as a result of cascading collisions—beginning with the breakup of a primordial 320 km (200 mi)-diameter parent body 4.47 billion years ago and then the breakup of one of its fragments into the S-type family.

==== X-type asteroids ====
The X-type asteroids of the Nysa–Polana complex, known as the "Hertha2 family" or simply the "Hertha family", represent a smaller population presumably associated with Hertha. It contains nearly 1,500 members as of 2024. (Note: Nesvorný et al. (2024) says the Hertha family contains 1,473 members. According to Marsset et al. (2026), the "Hertha family" label used by Nesvorný et al. (2024) was specifically referring to the X-type family.) Due to its small size, it represents only a minor source of X-type near-Earth asteroids. The X-type asteroid classification broadly includes the spectrally identical but compositionally different E-type, M-type, and P-type asteroids, which span a very wide range of albedos. While Hertha itself has a moderate albedo (0.14) consistent with that of an M-type asteroid, some asteroids in the Nysa–Polana complex have very high albedos approaching 0.5, indicating E-type compositions.

When plotted by proper semi-major axis against absolute magnitude, the X-type population displays less Yarkovsky spreading than those of the S-type population. This suggests that the asteroids of the X-type population are either denser or younger than the S-type population. Due to this ambiguity, it remains uncertain whether the S-type and X-type populations formed in separate collision events or formed together in a single collision.

Several hypotheses have been proposed to explain the existence of Hertha's spectrally distinct S-type and X-type families. These include impacts on a parent asteroid with compositionally differentiated layers, impact-induced shock darkening, or perhaps the two families may not be related. A 2026 study by Tatsumi et al. has even invoked the inclusion of Nysa and E-type asteroids in the formation of Hertha's families from a differentiated parent.

== See also ==
Other large asteroid families in the inner main belt (ordered by increasing inclination):

- Massalia family
- Erigone family
- Flora family
- Vesta family
