= Kulparia =

Kulparia Temporal range: 1000–600 Ma

Scientific classification
- Domain: Bacteria
- Kingdom: Bacillati
- Phylum: Cyanobacteriota
- Class: Cyanophyceae
- Genus: †Kulparia; W.V.Preiss & M.R.Walter, 1972

Type species
- †K. kulparensis W.V.Preiss & M.R.Walter, 1972

Species
- †K. kulparensis W.V.Preiss & M.R.Walter 1972; †K. alicia (P.E.Cloud & Semikhatov) W.V.Preiss & M.R.Walter 1972

Genus of Neoproterozoic cyanobacteria

Kulparia is a genus of fossil stromatolite-forming cyanobacteria from the late Neoproterozoic era. It is named after the town of Kulpara in South Australia, where the type specimen was found nearby.

== Description ==
Kulparia is a genus of cyanobacteria known from fossil stromatolites characterised by long, bumpy, almost straight columns arranged radially or parallel. Branching between columns is α- or β- parallel. Bridging and coalescing are very frequent, a wall between bridges is almost always present. Projections are moderately frequent to rare.

The stromatolites of Kulparia appear similar to Minjaria and Boxonia in gross form but is distinguished by its bumpy column margins and frequent bridging and coalescing.

== Taxonomy ==
K. kulparensis was initially assigned to the genus Patomia as Patomia sp. nov (Glaessner, Preiss, & Walter 1969) but was later assigned to its own genus where it became the type species.

Two species are recognised, K. kulparensis, and K. alicia.

== Distribution ==
Fossils of K. kulparensis have been found in the Umbertana Group in the northern Yorke Peninsula in South Australia, 4 miles (6.4 km) south of Kulpara.

K. alicia fossils have been found in the Loves Creek Member of the Bitter Springs Formation in the Amaedus Basin of Western Australia, 2.3 miles (3.7 km) west-south-west of Jay Creek Aboriginal Settlement.

== See also ==
- List of fossil stromatolite taxa
