= Pilbaria =

Pilbaria Temporal range: 2300–1700 Ma

Scientific classification
- Domain: Bacteria
- Kingdom: Bacillati
- Phylum: Cyanobacteriota
- Class: Cyanophyceae
- Genus: †Pilbaria; M.R.Walter 1972

Type species
- †P. perplexa M.R.Walter 1972

Species
- †P. boetsapia Bertrand-Sarfati and Eriksson 1977; †P. deverella K.Grey 1984; †P. inzeriaformis Bertrand-Sarfati and Eriksson 1977; †P. perplexa M.R.Walter 1972

Genus of Paleoproterozoic cyanobacteria

Pilbaria is a genus of fossil stromatolite-forming cyanobacteria from the Paleoproterozoic era 2.3 to 1.7 billion years ago. It is named after the Pilbara region of Western Australia where the type specimen was found.

== Description ==
The type species, Pilbaria perplexa is characterised by long, mostly straight, subparallel and mostly smooth columns with proportionately small transversely elongate niches with projections. Near the bases of beds, branching varies from parallel to markedly divergent, but above that level, it is α-β-parallel or slightly divergent. Laminae are predominantly steeply convex and form a patchy wall.

Pilbaria is similar to Inzeria and Nordia in that it has well-developed niches and projections.

== Distribution and age ==
Fossils of P. perplexa, the type species, have been found in the Wyloo Group of the Pilbara region in Western Australia, aged 1.7 to 2 billion years old. It has also been found in the Epworth Group of the Coronation and Pine Creek Geosynclines in Canada, aged 1.865 to 2.2 and 2 to 2.3 billion years old.

P. boetsapia and P. inzeriaformis are from Schmidtsdrift Formation of the Northern Cape Province in South Africa, aged approximately 2.2 billion years old.

P. deverella is from the Yelma and Frere formations of the Earaheedy Group of the Nabberu Basin in Western Australia. It is the youngest of the four species, with fossils from these areas aged to about 1.7 billion years old. Other stromatolite genera found in the Yelma formation include Ephyaltes, Externia, Murgurra and Yelma.

== See also ==
- List of fossil stromatolites
