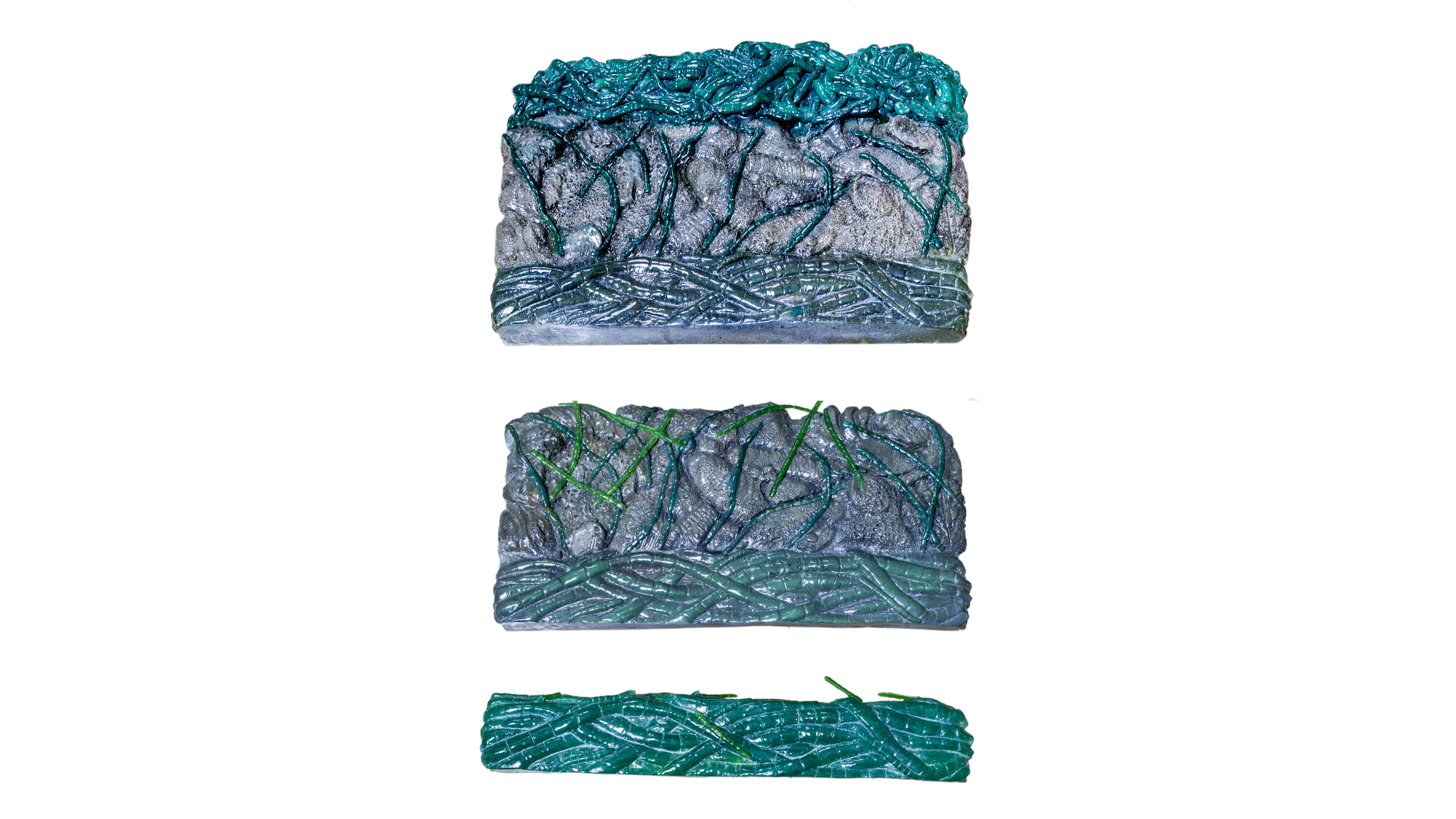

Scientific classification
- Domain: Bacteria
- Kingdom: Bacillati
- Phylum: Cyanobacteriota
- Genus: †Ozarkcollenia

Type species
- †Ozarkcollenia laminata

Species
- †Ozarkcollenia laminata

= Ozarkcollenia =

Ozarkcollenia Temporal range: 1500 Ma

Extinct genus of cyanobacteria

Ozarkcollenia is an extinct genus of stromatolite-making cyanobacteria from Missouri, United States. It was related to Collenia. Ozarkcollenia may have formed in a lake of volcanic origin. The fossils of Ozarkcollenia laminata have been dated to the Proterozoic eon, about 1.5 billion years ago. It occurs in parts of Missouri's Ozark Mountains.
