= Bitter Springs Group =

Precambrian fossil locality in Australia

- Stratigraphic range: Tonian; ~896–767 Ma
- Type: Geological group
- Sub-units: Gillen, Loves Creek & Johnnys Creek Formations

Lithology
- Primary: Chert

Location
- Coordinates: 23°32′34″S 134°27′26″E
- Region: Northern Territory, Western Australia
- Country: Australia
- Extent: Amadeus Basin
- Bitter Springs Group (Australia)

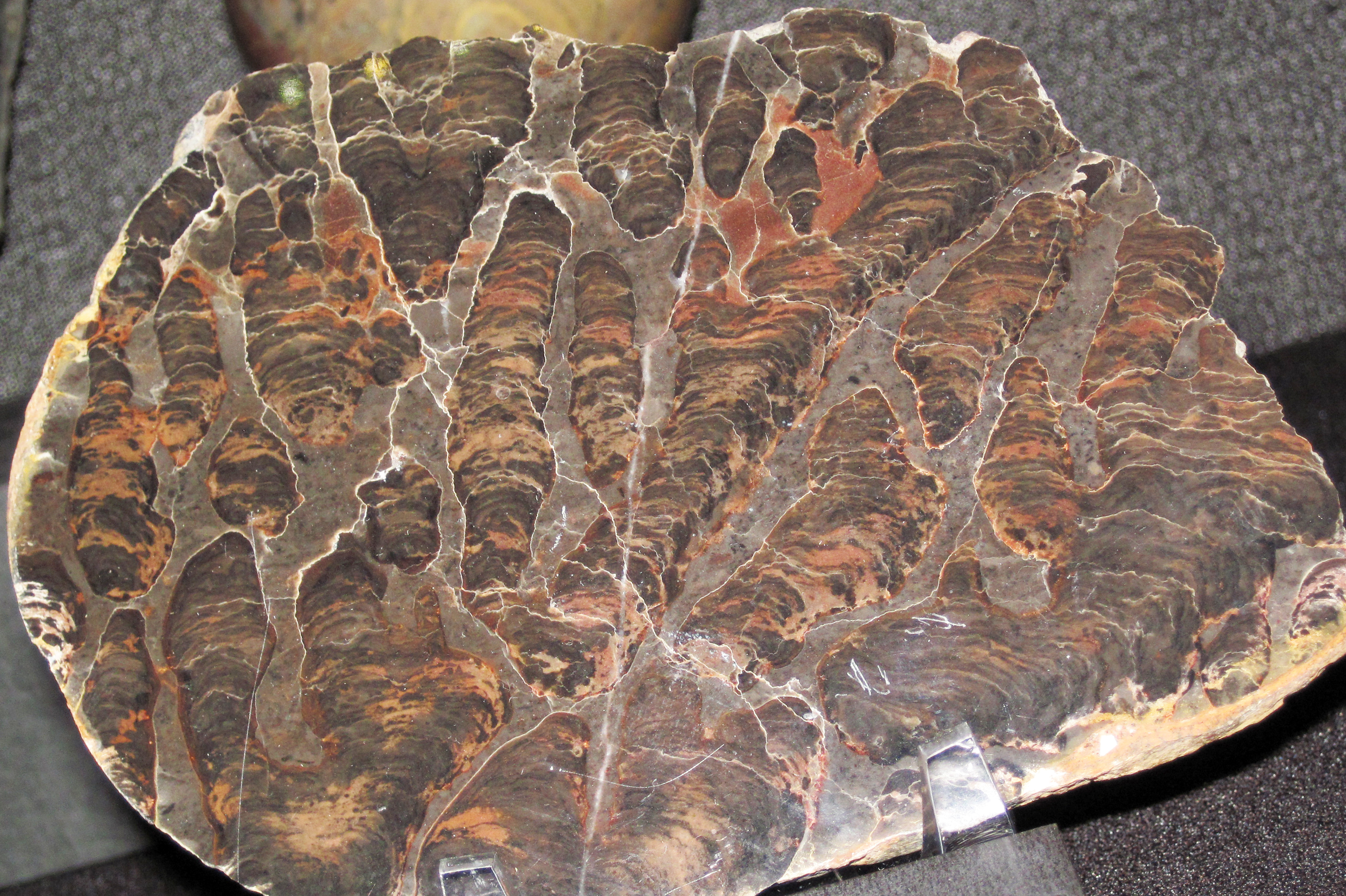
Fossil Inzeria intia stromatolites from the Bitter Springs Group

The Bitter Springs Group, also known as the Bitter Springs Formation is a Precambrian fossil locality in Australia, which preserves stromatolites and microorganisms in silica. Its preservational mode ceased in the late Neoproterozoic with the advent of silicifying organisms.

Fossils include exceptionally well-preserved cyanobacteria microfossils, as well as multiple stromatolite species, including Linella avis and Inzeria intia. This locality also has been claimed to contain eukaryotic green algae preservation, though this interpretation is debated.
