= 495 Eulalia =

Main-belt asteroid

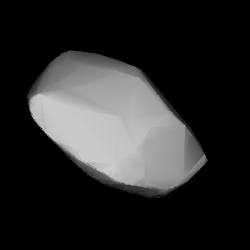
- Modelled shape of Eulalia from its lightcurve

Discovery
- Discovered by: Max Wolf
- Discovery site: Heidelberg Observatory
- Discovery date: 25 October 1902

Designations
- Pronunciation: /juːˈleɪliə/
- Named after: the discoverer's wife's grandmother
- Alternative designations: 1902 KG

Orbital characteristics
- Epoch 31 July 2016 (JD 2457600.5)
- Uncertainty parameter 0
- Observation arc: 113.10 yr (41309 d)
- Aphelion: 2.8101 AU (420.38 Gm)
- Perihelion: 2.1645 AU (323.80 Gm)
- Semi-major axis: 2.4873 AU (372.09 Gm)
- Eccentricity: 0.12977
- Orbital period (sidereal): 3.92 yr (1432.8 d)
- Mean anomaly: 5.5120°
- Mean motion: 0° 15^{m} 4.536^{s} / day
- Inclination: 2.2795°
- Longitude of ascending node: 186.478°
- Argument of perihelion: 206.971°

Physical characteristics
- Mean radius: 19.425±0.7 km
- Synodic rotation period: 28.967 h (1.2070 d)
- Geometric albedo: 0.0571±0.004
- Absolute magnitude (H): 10.78

495 Eulalia is a minor planet, specifically an asteroid orbiting in the asteroid belt. Eulalia is very near the 3:1 Jupiter orbital resonance. It is a member of the Eulalia family of asteroids, which is part of the Nysa–Polana complex of asteroids.

Origin of 162173 Ryugu may be either 495 Eulalia or 142 Polana Sun · Earth · 162173 Ryugu · 142 Polana · 495 Eulalia

It is possible that the disruption of Eulalia's parent body resulted in a mass bombardment of the Earth and Moon 800 million years ago, forming the Copernicus crater on the Moon and involving about 50 times the amount of material of the Chicxulub impact on Earth at the beginning of the Cryogenian geological period.
