= Jurusania =

Jurusania Temporal range: Neoproterozoic

Scientific classification
- Domain: Bacteria
- Kingdom: Bacillati
- Phylum: Cyanobacteriota
- Class: Cyanophyceae
- Genus: †Jurusania; I.N.Krylov, 1963

Type species
- †J. cylindrica I.N.Krylov 1963

Genus of fossil cyanobacteria

Jurusania is a genus of fossil stromatolite-forming cyanobacteria from the late Riphean to Vendian stages of the Neoproterozoic era.

== See also ==
- List of fossil stromatolites
