= 142 Polana =

Main-belt asteroid

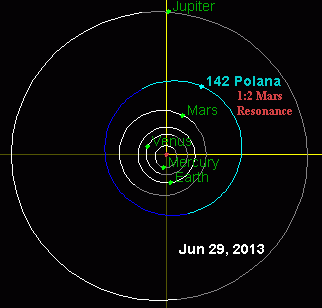
- Polana's orbit, showing its 1:2 resonance with Mars

Discovery
- Discovered by: J. Palisa
- Discovery site: Austrian Naval Obs.
- Discovery date: 28 January 1875

Designations
- Pronunciation
- Named after: Pula
- Alternative designations: A875 BA; 1923 WA; 1954 BH; 1956 XZ; 1963 SA
- Minor planet category: Asteroid belt

Orbital characteristics
- Epoch 31 July 2016 (JD 2457600.5)
- Uncertainty parameter 0
- Observation arc: 117.65 yr (42971 d)
- Aphelion: 2.7444 AU (410.56 Gm)
- Perihelion: 2.0934 AU (313.17 Gm)
- Semi-major axis: 2.4189 AU (361.86 Gm)
- Eccentricity: 0.13457
- Orbital period (sidereal): 3.76 yr (1374.1 d)
- Average orbital speed: 19.07 km/s
- Mean anomaly: 140.92°
- Mean motion: 0° 15^{m} 43.128^{s} / day
- Inclination: 2.2379°
- Longitude of ascending node: 291.27°
- Argument of perihelion: 292.00°

Physical characteristics
- Dimensions: 55.29±1.6 km 55.3 ± 1.6
- Synodic rotation period: 9.764 h (0.4068 d)
- Geometric albedo: 0.0451±0.003; 0.045 ± 0.003
- Spectral type: F/B; B−V=0.621±0.022; U−B=0.236±0.035
- Absolute magnitude (H): 10.27

142 Polana is a very dark asteroid from the asteroid belt. It was discovered by Johann Palisa on January 28, 1875, and named after the city of Pola (now Pula, Croatia), home of the Austrian Naval Observatory where he made the discovery.

It is the largest member of the eponymously named New Polana family, an family of dark, carbonaceous asteroids in the Nysa–Polana complex. The asteroid has an estimated diameter of about 55.3 km and a low albedo of 0.045. It is orbiting at a distance of 2.419 times the separation of the Earth from the Sun, with an orbital period of 3.76 years and an eccentricity of 0.14.

In the Tholen classification scheme, Polana is a primitive carbonaceous asteroid of type F, which is a subdivision of more common C-type. Under the SMASS classification taxonomy, Polana is listed as a B-type asteroid, a group that combines both the Tholen B and F types. The spectrum of this object suggests the presence of magnetite (Fe_{3}O_{4}), which gives it the spectrally blue coloration that is a characteristic of this SMASS class.

Origin of 162173 Ryugu may be either 495 Eulalia or 142 Polana Sun · Earth · 162173 Ryugu · 142 Polana · 495 Eulalia

== Mars resonance ==
Polana is in a 1:2 orbital resonance with Mars, meaning that Polana orbits the Sun once for every two orbits that Mars completes. This resonance helps protect the asteroid from orbital erosion: the orbital eccentricities of the resonant asteroids are clearly greater than the non-resonant asteroids. There is a peak in the number of asteroids located at 2.419 AU from the Sun. In spite of strong perturbations caused by the passing of both Jupiter and Mars, the 1:2 Mars resonance brings about stability for billions of years. There are up to 1,500 asteroids in this resonance, and the resonance between Polana and Mars will strengthen over the next million years due to Polana transitioning into a strong libration period with Mars.
