= List of fossil stromatolite taxa =

This is a list of all extinct cyanobacteria genera that formed stromatolites. Most stromatolites have been dated at least 3 billion years ago.

Collenia
Species	Time period	Location	Image
†C. frequens	Late Proterozoic	Australia United States	
†C. symmetrica			
†C. undosa	Paleoproterozoic (Siderian/Rhyacian)	United States (Minnesota)	Collenia sp. (left), and Collenia undosa (right)

Conophyton
Species	Time period	Location	Image
†C. basalticum	Early Cambrian or Ediacaran (Vendian)	Australia	
†C. garganicum australae var. nov.	1080 ± 80mya (Stenian)	Australia	
†C. vindhyanensis		India	

Inzeria
Species	Time period	Location
†I. intia	Late Proterozoic (Riphean)	Australia

Jurusania
Species	Time period	Location
†J. nisvensis	Late Proterozoic (Riphean)	Australia

Kulparia
Species	Time period	Location
†K. alicia	Late Proterozoic (Riphean)	Australia
†K. kulparensis	Late Proterozoic (Riphean)	Australia

Kussiella
Species	Time period	Location
†K. kussiensis		India

Linella
Species	Time period	Location
†L. avis	Late Proterozoic (Riphean)	Australia

Pilbaria
Species	Time period	Location
†P. boetsapia	2.2bya (Paleoproterozoic)	South Africa
†P. deverella	1.7bya (Paleoproterozoic)	Australia
†P. inzeriaformis	2.2bya (Paleoproterozoic)	South Africa
†P. perplexa	1.7 - 2bya (Paleoproterozoic)	Australia Canada
