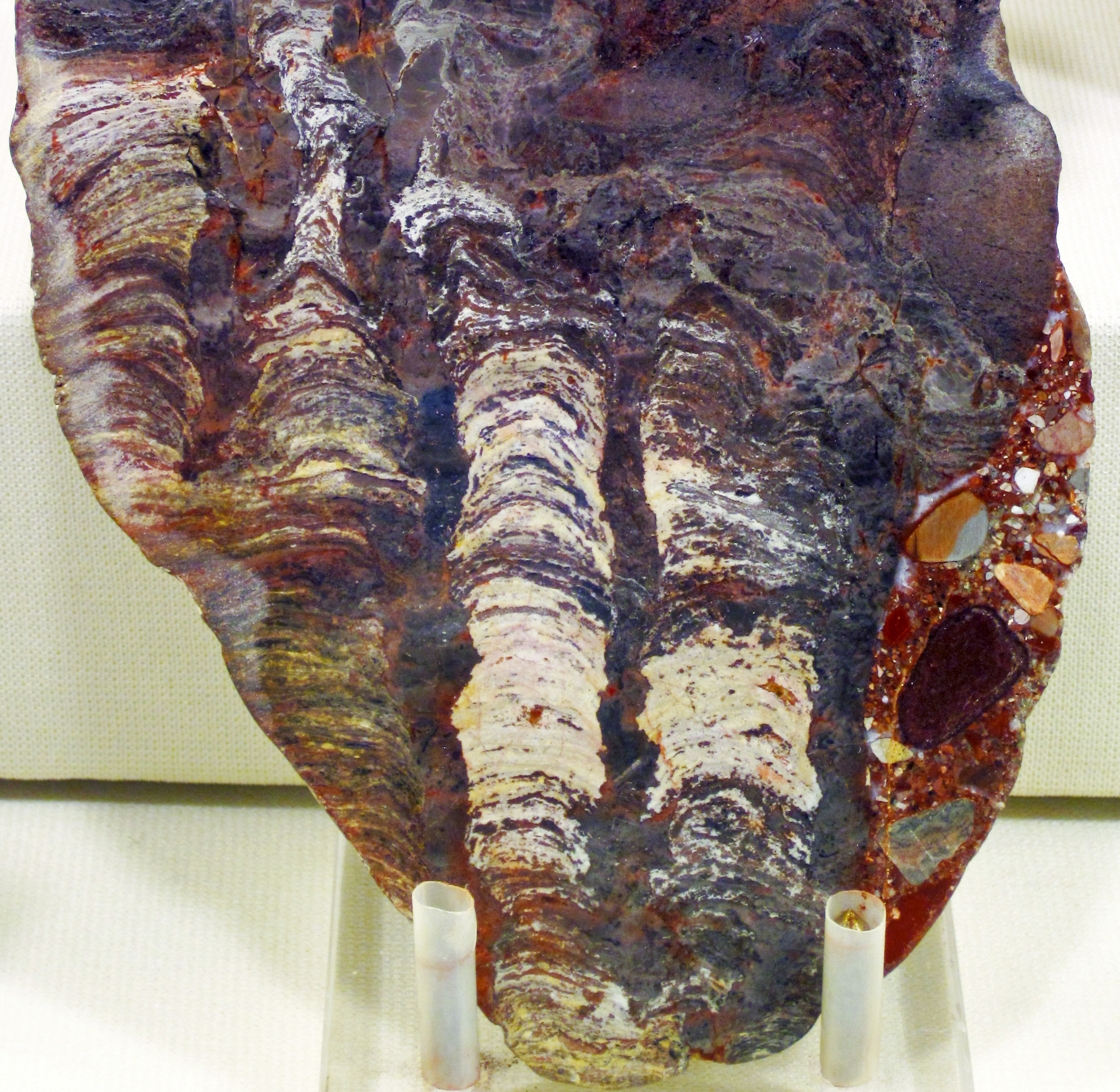
- Stromatolites, Neoproterozoic, 850 Ma in Australia

Scientific classification
- Domain: Bacteria
- Kingdom: Bacillati
- Phylum: Cyanobacteriota
- Class: Cyanophyceae
- Genus: †Conophyton; Maslov, 1937

Type species
- †C. lituum Maslov 1937

= Conophyton =

Conophyton Temporal range: Neoproterozoic

Genus of fossil cyanobacteria

Conophyton is a genus of stromatolite-forming cyanobacteria from the Neoproterozoic era. Fossils have been found in many countries, including Australia, India, China and Russia.

== See also ==
- List of fossil stromatolites
