= 135 Hertha =

Main-belt asteroid

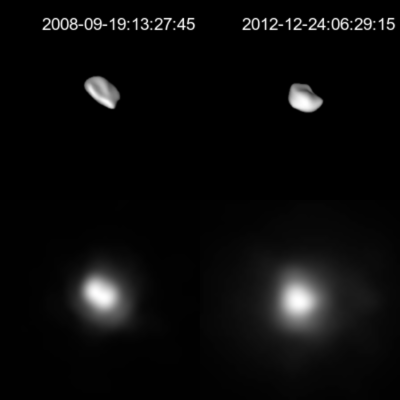
- Lightcurve-based 3D model of Hertha on the top with an image of the asteroid on the bottom

Discovery
- Discovered by: C. H. F. Peters
- Discovery site: Litchfield Obs.
- Discovery date: 18 February 1874

Designations
- Pronunciation: /ˈhɜːrθə/
- Named after: Nerthus (Norse mythology)
- Alternative designations: A874 DA (Note: The MPC notates Hertha's retroactive new-style designation as 1874 DA.)
- Minor planet category: main-belt · (inner); Nysa–Polana complex (Hertha)

Orbital characteristics
- Epoch 23 March 2018 (JD 2458200.5)
- Uncertainty parameter 0
- Observation arc: 133.34 yr (48,701 d)
- Aphelion: 2.9320 AU
- Perihelion: 1.9239 AU
- Semi-major axis: 2.4279 AU
- Eccentricity: 0.2076
- Orbital period (sidereal): 3.78 yr (1,382 d)
- Mean anomaly: 233.89°
- Mean motion: 0° 15^{m} 37.8^{s} / day
- Inclination: 2.3052°
- Longitude of ascending node: 343.65°
- Argument of perihelion: 340.16°

Physical characteristics
- Mean diameter: 80 ± 2 km
- Mass: (8.4±1.2)×10^{17} kg (Note: Calculated from its standard gravitational parameter GM = 0.056±0.008 km^{3}/s^{2}.) (1.21±0.16)×10^{18} kg (composite estimate)
- Mean density: 3.11±0.52 g/cm^{3} 4.5±0.7 g/cm^{3}
- Synodic rotation period: 8.40060 h
- Pole ecliptic longitude: 277° ± 3°
- Pole ecliptic latitude: 53° ± 3°
- Geometric albedo: 0.1436
- Spectral type: M or X
- Absolute magnitude (H): 8.23

135 Hertha is an asteroid from the inner region of the asteroid belt, approximately 77 kilometers (48 miles) in diameter. Discovered on 18 February 1874 by German–American astronomer Christian Peters at the Litchfield Observatory near Clinton, New York, it was named after the Teutonic and Scandinavian goddess of fertility, Hertha, also known as Nerthus. It orbits among the Nysa–Polana complex, but its classification as a metallic M-type asteroid does not match the more common carbonaceous and silicaceous compositions seen in this family. Spectroscopic analysis indicates the possible presence of hydrated silicates indicating that Hertha should possibly be reclassified from its present M-type to the proposed W-type.

Lightcurve data from Hertha indicates a flattened body, and radar observations indicate that Hertha is non-metallic. Five occultations of stars by the asteroid have been observed between 2000 and 2015.

== Discovery ==
Hertha was discovered by C. H. F. Peters on 18 February 1874, in Clinton, New York. Further observations were carried out in 1883 by W. T. Sampson and communicated to Astronomische Nachrichten on his behalf by Rear Admiral R. W. Shufeldt.

== Physical properties ==
After its discovery in 1874, subsequent observations in 1884 established Hertha's orbit. Astronomers then began investigation of its physical properties. As early as 1904, G. W. Hill reported observations of Hertha's brightness indicating a variation of half a magnitude and a short period.

In October 1992 Dotto et al. performed 20 hours of observations spread over 6 nights to investigate Hertha's rotational period, approximate shape, and the coordinates of its rotational axis. They were able to confirm a rotational period of 8.398 ± .001 hours as previously measured by Harris et al. published earlier in 1992. In the same study, Dotto et al. measured the asteroid's shape and rotational axis. The axes' ratios were found to be: a/b = 1.34 ± .03 and b/c = 1.22 ± .05. Two possible values were determined for the rotational axis, however further measurements at different ecliptic longitudes are required to determine which is correct.

In August 2003 Torppa et al. published their results on the shape and rotational properties of a number of asteroids, including Hertha. Utilizing data from 42 lightcurves of Hertha spanning from 1978 to 2002, a more refined set of axes' ratios was obtained and a detailed shape model was obtained through inversion. New values for the axes' ratios are: a/b = 1.1 and b/c = 1.5. Measurements of the pole direction were also obtained, however like Dotto et al. they were unable to differentiate between their two possible solutions of (β=+58°, λ=96°) and (β=+53°, λ=274°).

In 2017, Hanuš et al. confirmed that the correct solution is β=53±3°, λ=277±3°. They also calculated the first non-convex shape model, based on lightcurve and stellar occultation data.

=== Spectral classification ===
Although Hertha has long been classified as an M-type asteroid based on its spectral properties, observations carried out by Rivkin et al. in 1996 using the IRTF at Mauna Kea Observatory have raised the possibility of reclassification. The presence of a dip in the observed spectrum at 3 μm indicates that the surface is hydrated, suggesting that Hertha should be reclassified as a W-type (a "wet M-type") asteroid. Based on work carried out by Salisbury and Walter, the Rivkin study estimated the water content of the asteroid to be between 0.14 and 0.27 percent by mass. This estimate is based on laboratory measurements and may not be applicable to asteroids in space.

A more recent study by Rivkin et al. published in 2002 examined the dependence of spectral absorption on the asteroid's rotational phase. The study looked at the 0.7 μm band, which is also associated with hydrated silicates, and found that the reflectance changes as the asteroid rotates, suggesting that the surface is heterogeneous with some hydrated areas intermixed with dry areas.

== Asteroid family ==
Hertha believed to be the largest member of two overlapping asteroid families in the inner main belt, known as the Hertha families (also historically known as the "Nysa family"). These two families also overlap with several other unrelated asteroid families, together forming the Nysa–Polana complex. The Hertha families are divided by color and spectral type: S-type asteroids belong to the "Hertha1" family while X-type asteroids belong to the "Hertha2" family. Of these, the Hertha1 family is larger in population. The asteroids of both Hertha families are believed to be collisional fragments from Hertha, although it is unclear whether both families formed together from one collision event or formed separately in different collision events. In either case, the different compositions of the Hertha families suggest that the parent body must have compositionally different layers.
