= Linella =

Linella Temporal range: Neoproterozoic

Scientific classification
- Domain: Bacteria
- Kingdom: Bacillati
- Phylum: Cyanobacteriota
- Class: Cyanophyceae
- Genus: †Linella; I.N.Krylov, 1967

Type species
- †L. ukka I.N.Krylov 1967

Species
- † L. akkaniella Bertrand-Sarfati & Siedlecka 1980; † L. avis I.N.Krylov 1967; † L. munyallina W.V.Preiss 1974; † L. simica I.N.Krylov 1967; † L. trollina Bertrand-Sarfati & Siedlecka 1980; † L. ukka I.N.Krylov 1967

Genus of Neoproterozoic cyanobacteria

Linella is a genus of fossil stromatolite-forming cyanobacteria from the late Neoproterozoic era. There are currently 6 accepted species.

== See also ==
- List of fossil stromatolites
