= 162173 Ryugu =

Apollo asteroid

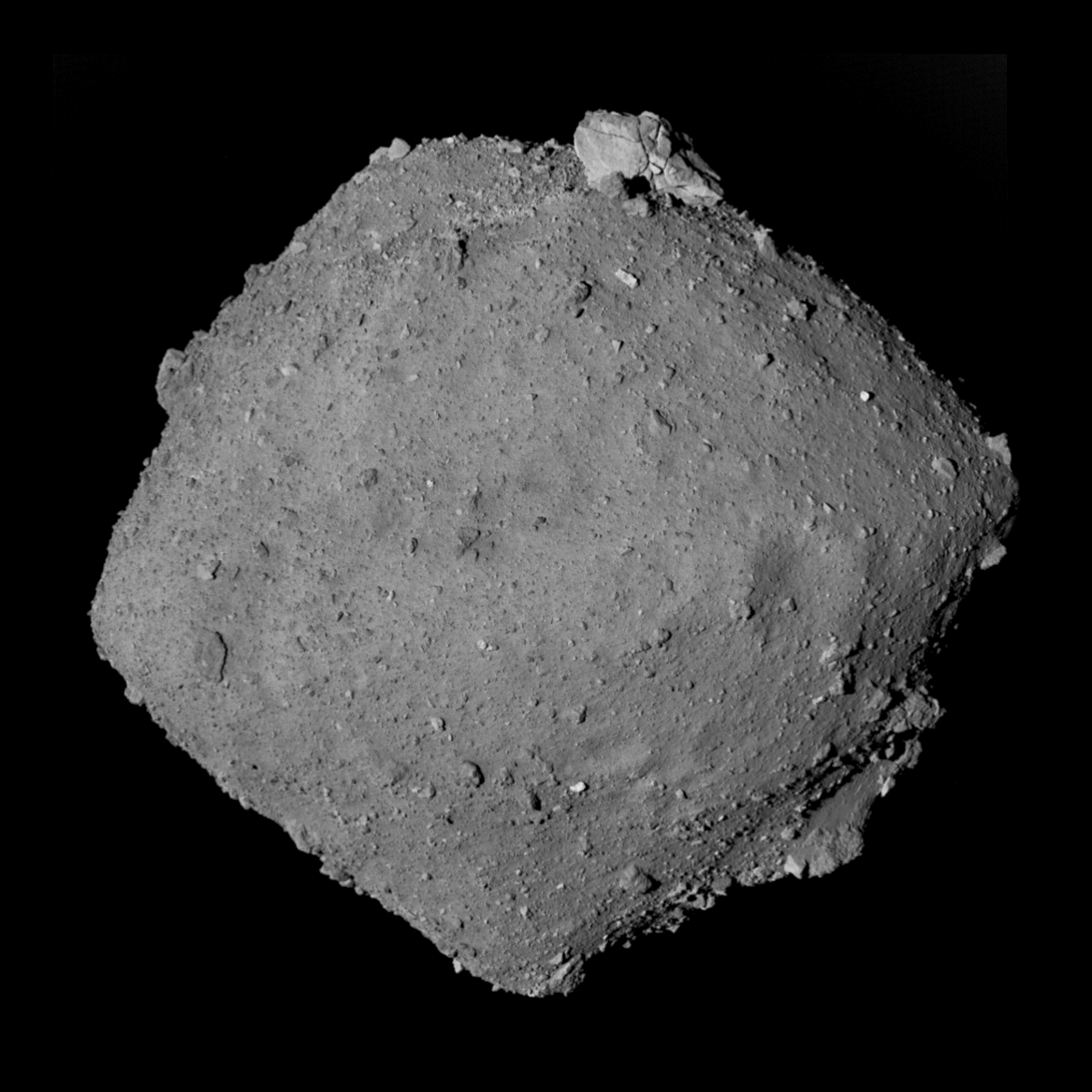
- Ryugu photographed by Hayabusa2 in September 2018

Discovery
- Discovered by: LINEAR
- Discovery site: Lincoln Lab's ETS
- Discovery date: 10 May 1999

Designations
- Pronunciation: Japanese: [ɾjɯːɡɯː]; in English: /riˈjuːɡuː/, spelling-pronunciation /raɪˈjuːɡuː/, or approximating the Japanese by dropping the R or the Y.
- Named after: Ryūgū ("Dragon palace")
- Alternative designations: 1999 JU_{3}
- Minor planet category: Apollo · NEO · PHA

Orbital characteristics
- Epoch 12 December 2011 (JD 2455907.5)
- Uncertainty parameter 0
- Observation arc: 30.32 yr (11,075 d)
- Aphelion: 1.4159 AU
- Perihelion: 0.9633 AU
- Semi-major axis: 1.1896 AU
- Eccentricity: 0.1902
- Orbital period (sidereal): 1.30 yr (474 d)
- Mean anomaly: 3.9832°
- Mean motion: 0° 45^{m} 34.56^{s} / day
- Inclination: 5.8837°
- Longitude of ascending node: 251.62°
- Argument of perihelion: 211.43°
- Earth MOID: 0.0006 AU (0.2337 LD)

Physical characteristics
- Dimensions: 1004 m × 876 m
- Mean radius: 448±2 m
- Equatorial radius: 502±2 m
- Polar radius: 438±2 m
- Volume: 0.377±0.005 km^{3}
- Mass: (4.50±0.06)×10^{11} kg
- Mean density: 1.19±0.03 g cm^{−3}
- Equatorial surface gravity: 1/80,000 g
- Synodic rotation period: 7.63262±0.00002 h
- Axial tilt: 171.64°±0.03°
- North pole right ascension: +96.40°±0.03°
- North pole declination: −66.40°±0.03°
- Geometric albedo: 0.037±0.002; 0.042±0.003; 0.047±0.003; 0.063±0.020; 0.07±0.01; 0.078±0.013
- Spectral type: SMASS = Cg · C · Cb
- Absolute magnitude (H): 18.69±0.07 (R); 18.82; 19.2; 19.25±0.03; 19.3

162173 Ryugu (provisional designation 1999 JU_{3}) is a near-Earth object and also a potentially hazardous asteroid of the Apollo group. It measures approximately 900 metres (3,000 ft) in diameter and is a dark object of the rare spectral type Cb, with qualities of both a C-type asteroid and a B-type asteroid. In June 2018, the Japanese spacecraft Hayabusa2 arrived at the asteroid. After making measurements and taking samples, Hayabusa2 left Ryugu for Earth in November 2019 and returned the sample capsule to Earth on 5 December 2020. The samples showed the presence of organic compounds, such as uracil (one of the four components in RNA) and vitamin B3.

== Discovery and name ==
Ryugu was discovered on 10 May 1999 by astronomers with the Lincoln Near-Earth Asteroid Research at the Lincoln Lab's ETS near Socorro, New Mexico, in the United States. It was given the provisional designation 1999 JU_{3}. The asteroid was officially named "Ryugu" by the Minor Planet Center on 28 September 2015 (M.P.C. 95804). The name refers to Ryūgū-jō (Dragon Palace), a magical underwater palace in a Japanese folktale. In the story, the fisherman Urashima Tarō travels to the palace on the back of a turtle, and when he returns, he carries with him a mysterious box, much like Hayabusa2 returning with samples.

== Geological history ==
Ryugu formed as part of an asteroid family, belonging either to Eulalia or Polana. Those asteroid families are most likely fragments of past asteroid collisions. The large number of boulders on the surface supports a catastrophic disruption of the parent body. The parent body of Ryugu probably experienced dehydration due to internal heating and must have formed in an environment without a strong magnetic field. After this catastrophic disruption, part of the surface was reshaped again by the high speed rotation of the asteroid forming the equatorial ridge (Ryujin Dorsum), through internal failure and/or mass wasting. The geologically distinct western area ('Western bulge') is probably the result of asymmetrical internal failure. It is hoped that surface samples will help to reveal more of the geological history of the asteroid.

Ryugu is hypothesized to be an extinct comet.

== Characteristics ==
=== Orbit ===
The origin of 162173 Ryugu may be either 495 Eulalia or 142 Polana. Sun · Earth · 162173 Ryugu · 142 Polana · 495 Eulalia

Ryugu orbits the Sun at a distance of 0.96–1.41 AU once every 16 months (474 days; semi-major axis of 1.19 AU). Its orbit has an eccentricity of 0.19 and an inclination of 6° with respect to the ecliptic. It has a minimum orbital intersection distance with Earth of 95,443.442 km (0.000638 AU), equivalent to 0.23 lunar distances.

=== Physical ===
Early analysis in 2012 by Thomas G. Müller et al. used data from a number of observatories, and suggested that the asteroid was "almost spherical", a fact that hinders precise conclusions, with retrograde rotation, an effective diameter of 0.85–0.88 km (0.528 miles) and a geometric albedo of 0.044 to 0.050. They estimated that the grain sizes of its surface materials are between 1 and 10 mm.

Initial images taken by the Hayabusa2 spacecraft on approach at a distance of 700 km (430 mi) were released on 14 June 2018. They revealed a diamond-shaped body 1 km in diameter and confirmed its retrograde motion. Between 17 and 18 June 2018, Hayabusa2 went from 330 to 240 km (210 to 150 mi) from Ryugu and captured a series of additional images from the closer approach. Astronomer Brian May created stereoscopic images from data collected a few days later. After a few months of exploration, JAXA scientists concluded that Ryugu is actually a rubble pile with about 50% of its volume being empty space.

The acceleration due to gravity at the equator has been evaluated at about 0.11 mm/s^{2}, rising to 0.15 mm/s^{2} at the poles. The mass of Ryugu is estimated at 450 million tonnes. The asteroid has a volume of 0.377 ± 0.005 km^{3} and a bulk density of 1.19 ± 0.03 g/cm^{3} based on the shape model.

=== Shape ===
Image sequence showing the rotation of Ryugu

Ryugu has a round shape with an equatorial ridge, called Ryujin Dorsum. Ryugu is a spinning top-shape asteroid similar to Bennu. The ridge was shaped by strong centrifugal forces during a phase of high-speed rotation, through landslides and/or internal failure. The western side, also called the western bulge, has a distinct shape. It has a smooth surface with a sharp equatorial ridge. When modeling a high-speed rotation of present-day Ryugu, subsurface material appears structurally intact and relaxed in the western bulge, while other regions are more sensitive to structural failure. This indicates past structural failure in the western bulge (only the elements that did not experience structural failure previously are now sensitive to failure). The western bulge is bordered by the Tokoyo and Horai Fossae.

=== Surface ===
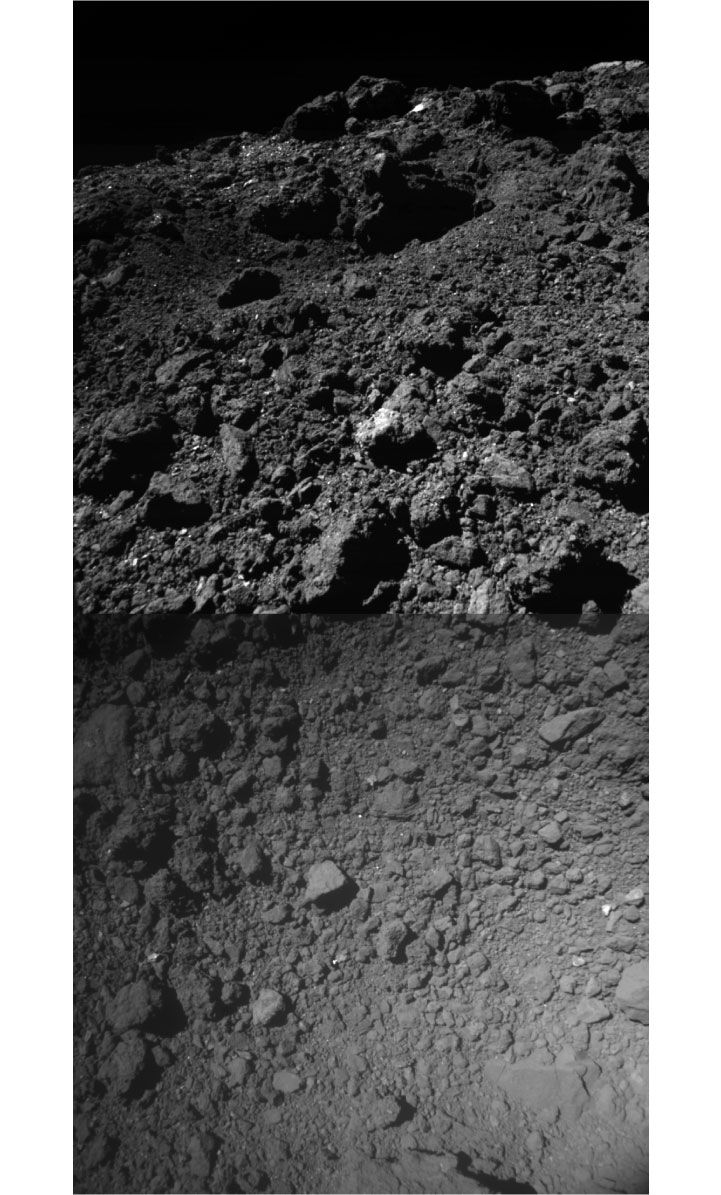
Images of the asteroid's surface made with Hayabusa2

Observations from Hayabusa2 showed that the surface of Ryugu is very young and has an age of 8.9 ± 2.5 million years based on the data collected from the artificial crater that was created with an explosive by Hayabusa2.

The surface of Ryugu is porous and contains no or very little dust. The measurements with the radiometer on board of MASCOT, which is called MARA, showed a low thermal conductivity of the boulders. This was an in situ measurement of the high porosity of the boulder material. This result showed that most meteorites originating from C-type asteroids are too fragile to survive the entry into Earth's atmosphere. The images from the camera of MASCOT, which is called MASCam, showed that surface of Ryugu contains two different almost black types of rock with little internal cohesion, but no dust was detected. One type of rocky material on the surface is brighter with a smooth surface and sharp edges. The other type of rock is dark with a cauliflower-like, crumbly surface. The dark type of rock has a dark matrix with small, bright, spectrally different inclusions. The inclusions appear similar to CI chondrites. An unanticipated side effect from the Hayabusa2 thrusters revealed a coating of dark, fine-grained red material.

==== Craters ====
Ryugu has 77 craters on the surface. Ryugu shows variations of crater density that cannot be explained by randomness of cratering. There are more craters at lower latitudes and fewer at higher latitudes, and fewer craters in the western bulge (160°E – 290°E) than in the region around the meridian (300°E – 30°E). This variation is seen as evidence of a complicated geologic history of Ryugu. The surface has one artificial crater, which was intentionally formed by the Small Carry-on Impactor (SCI), which was deployed by Hayabusa2. SCI fired a 2 kg copper mass onto the surface of Ryugu on 5 April 2019. The artificial crater showed a darker subsurface material. It created an ejecta of 1 cm thickness and excavated material from up to 1 metre in depth.

==== Boulders ====
Ryugu contains 4,400 boulders with a size larger than 5 metres. Ryugu has more large boulders per surface area than Itokawa or Bennu, about one boulder larger than 20 metres per 50 km^{2}. The boulders resemble laboratory impact fragments. The high number of boulders is explained with a catastrophic disruption of Ryugu's larger parent body. The largest boulder, called Otohime, has a size of ~160 × 120 × 70 m and is too large to be explained as an ejected boulder from a crater.

=== Sample analysis results ===
After the initial description (phase-1), part of the sample was distributed to the Hayabusa2 Initial Analysis Team, consisting of six sub-teams, and two Phase-2 curation institutes at Okayama University and JAMSTEC Kochi Institute for Core Sample Research.

In September 2022 the Hayabusa 2 initial Analysis Stone Team announced the results of their study, which includes:

- Ryugu samples contain grains that were formed at high temperatures above 1000 °C, which formed close to the Sun and were later transported towards the outer Solar System.
- The samples are soft enough to be cut with a knife and the samples preserve the magnetic field like a hard disk.
- A simulation of the formation was performed, which showed that the parent body of Ryugu accumulated 2 million years after the formation of the Solar System. It heated up to 50 °C over the next 3 million years, resulting in reactions of rocky material with water. In these reactions anhydrous silicates became hydrous silicates and iron became magnetite. The 100 km large parent body was then destroyed by a <10 km large impactor, with an impact speed of about 5 km/s. Ryugu then formed from material far from the impact.

In March 2026, all five canonical nucleobases were found from these samples.

==== Origin from the outer Solar System ====
The deuterium-rich and nitrogen-15-rich isotopic compositions of fine-grained minerals and organics suggests that the parent body of Ryugu formed in the outer Solar System. Titanium, chromium and molybdenum isotopic anomalies provide more evidence that ties Ryugu's origin to the outer Solar System.

Based on preserved magnetism in the samples researchers concluded that the parent body of Ryugu was probably formed in the darkness of nebular gas.

==== Volatiles ====
===== Water =====
The Hayabusa2 sample capsule was significantly upgraded from Hayabusa, to preserve water, light organics, gases, and other volatiles. This water was successfully sampled and preserved. Via a bulk sample (~95 milligrams), its water content was reported as 6.84 ±0.34 wt%.

Independently, a research group with a far smaller allocation (particles) reported 4–7 percent water.

The lower-than-expected water signature seen by Hayabusa2 instruments was the result of space weathering, producing a dehydrated rind.

====== Liquid water and aqueous alteration ======
Carbonated liquid water was discovered in one crystal. The water contained salts and organic matter. The liquid water was found inside a hexagonal iron sulfide crystal. The carbon dioxide was most likely CO_{2}-ice (dry ice) inside the parent body. The water ice melted soon after the parent body formed and the CO_{2} dissolved into the water.

Crystals "shaped like coral reefs" were found. These crystals probably formed in liquid water, which was once present in the interior of the parent body. The parent body had a dryer surface and a wetter interior. After the collision of the parent body with a smaller asteroid, the interior and surface material were mixed. Today Ryugu has both interior and parent body surface material on its surface.

An international team found particles in the samples that contained small amounts of material unaltered by water. The team found about 0.5 vol% of anhydrous silicates. The isotopic analysis of the magnesium-rich olivine and pyroxene in the sample suggests that two types of high-temperature objects accreted onto the surface of Ryugu: amoeboid olivine aggregates and magnesium-rich chondrules.

===== Gas =====
Hayabusa2 recovered helium and other noble gases. Some terrestrial contamination entered the system, but the Ryugu components are still measurable.

===== Organic molecules =====
Aliphatic carbon-rich organics associated with coarse-grained phyllosilicates were found. Such an association has not been observed in any meteorite study and could be unique to the asteroid Ryugu.

In samples retrieved on Ryugu from the Japanese Hayabusa2 spacecraft, scientists discovered 20 different amino acids.

In March 2023, scientists announced that uracil and vitamin B3 were detected in samples retrieved from Ryugu. Unlike previous instances when nucleobases and vitamins were found in certain carbon-rich meteorites, the samples were collected directly from the asteroid and delivered to Earth in sealed capsules, which meant Earthside contamination was not possible.

==== Similarities to CI chondrites ====
NanoSIMS-based analysis at the Carnegie Institution found that the Ryugu samples contained grains older than the solar system. The abundance and composition of these presolar grains were similar when compared to presolar grains in CI chondrites. Researchers using the particle accelerator in J-PARC, used Muon beams to analyse the chemical composition of the samples. The researchers found a similar composition when compared to CI chondrites, but a 25% lower oxygen abundance relative to silicon for the Ryugu samples. The oxygen excess in meteorites might come from contamination after they entered earth's atmosphere.

=== Magnetic field ===
No magnetic field was detected near Ryugu on a global or local scale. This measurement is based on the magnetometer on board of MASCOT, which is called MasMag. This shows that Ryugu does not generate a magnetic field, indicating that the larger body from which it was fragmented was not generated in an environment with a strong magnetic field. This result cannot be generalized for C-type asteroids, however, because the surface of Ryugu seems to have been recreated in a catastrophic disruption.

== Surface features ==
As of August 2019, there are 13 surface features that are named by the IAU. The three landing sites are not officially confirmed but are referred to by specific names in media by JAXA. The theme of features on Ryugu is "children's stories". Ryugu was the first object to introduce the feature type known as the saxa, referring to the large boulders found on Ryugu's surface.

=== Craters ===
Feature	Named after
Brabo	Silvius Brabo
Cendrillon	Cendrillon
Kibidango	Kibidango featured in Momotaro
Kintaro	Kintarou, the child with super strength who grew up on Mount Ashigara
Kolobok	Kolobok
Momotarou	Momotarou
Urashima	Urashima Taro

=== Dorsa ===
A dorsum is a ridge. There is a single dorsum on Ryugu.

Feature	Named after
Ryujin Dorsum	Ryujin

=== Fossae ===
A fossa is a ditch-like feature.

Feature	Named after
Horai Fossa	Horai
Tokoyo Fossa	Tokoyo

=== Saxa ===
A saxum is a large boulder. Ryugu is the first astronomical object with them being named. Two boulders have been named "Styx" and "Small Styx" unofficially by the JAXA team; it is unknown if these names will be submitted for IAU approval. Both names refer to the River Styx.

Feature	Named after
Catafo Saxum	Catafo, from Cajun folktales
Ejima Saxum	Ejima, the location where Urashima Taro rescued the turtle
Otohime Saxum	Otohime

=== Landing sites ===
JAXA has given informal names to the specific landing and collection sites.

Feature	Named after	Notes
Alice's Wonderland	Alice in Wonderland	MASCOT landing site
Tritonis	Lake Tritonis	MINERVA-II1 landing site, initially referred to as "Trinitas"; as of February 2019 this has been rectified.
Tamatebako	Tamatebako	Site of first sample collection
Uchide-no-Kozuchi	Uchide no kozuchi	Site of second sample collection

== Exploration ==
=== Hayabusa2 mission ===
Animation of Hayabusa2's orbit from 3 December 2014 Hayabusa2 162173 Ryugu Earth Sun

The Japan Aerospace Exploration Agency (JAXA) spacecraft Hayabusa2 was launched in December 2014 and successfully arrived at the asteroid on 27 June 2018. It returned material from the asteroid to Earth in December 2020.

The Hayabusa2 mission includes four rovers with various scientific instruments. The rovers are named HIBOU (aka Rover-1A), OWL (aka Rover-1B), MASCOT and Rover-2 (aka MINERVA-II-2). On 21 September 2018, the first two of these rovers, HIBOU and OWL (together the MINERVA-II-1 rovers) which hop around the surface of the asteroid, were released from Hayabusa2. This marks the first time a mission has completed a successful landing on a fast-moving asteroid body.

On 3 October 2018, the German-French Mobile Asteroid Surface Scout (MASCOT) lander successfully arrived on Ryugu, ten days after the MINERVA rovers landed. Its mission was short-lived, as was planned; the lander had only 16 hours of battery power and no way to recharge.

Hayabusa2 touched down briefly on February 22, 2019, on Ryugu, fired a small tantalum projectile into the surface to collect the cloud of surface debris within the sampling horn, and then moved back to its holding position. The second sampling was from the subsurface, and it involved firing a large copper projectile from an altitude of 500 metres to expose pristine material. After several weeks, it touched down on 11 July 2019 to sample the subsurface material, using its sampler horn and tantalum bullet.

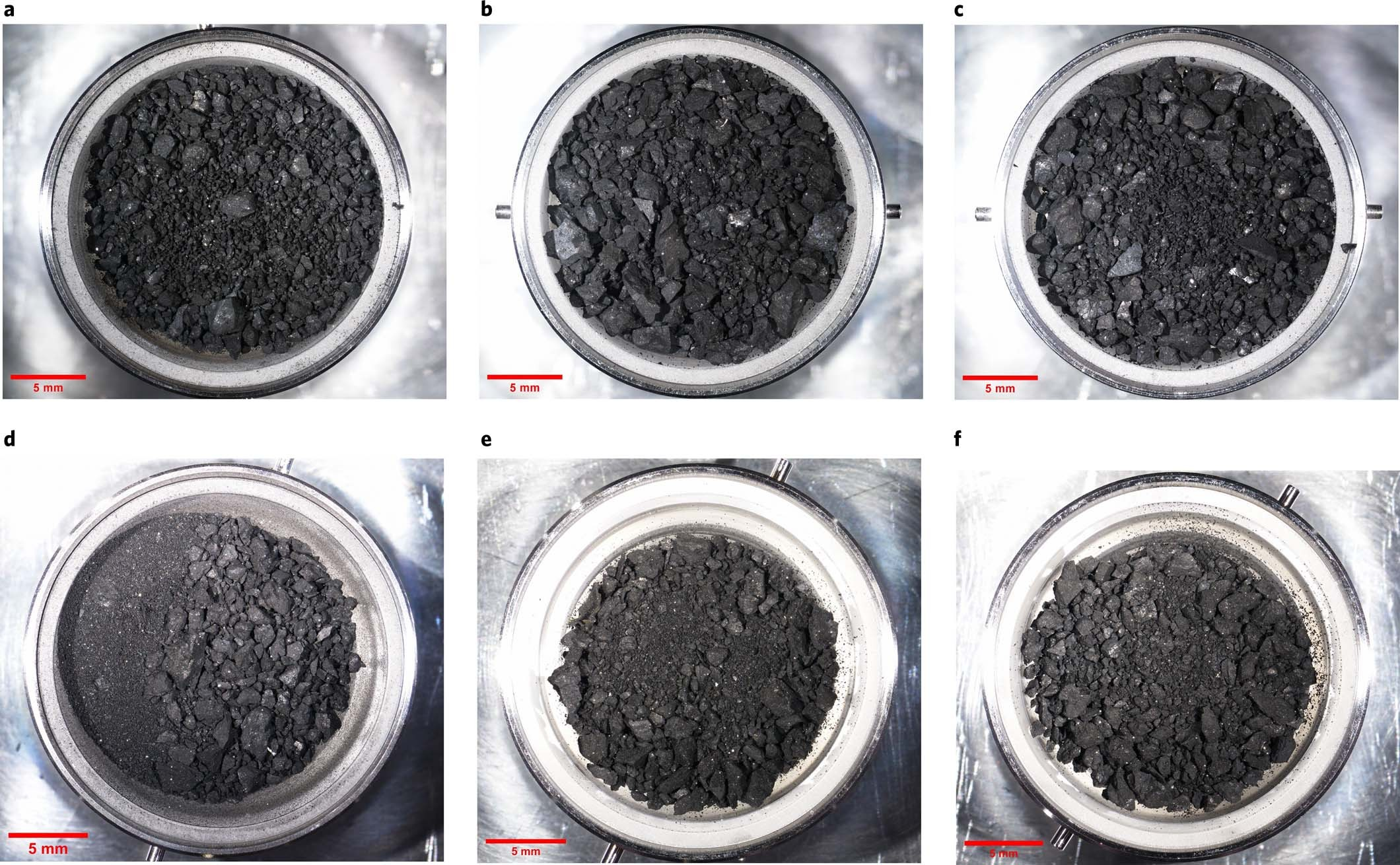
Samples of Ryugu returned by Hayabusa2

The last rover, Rover-2 or MINERVA-II-2, failed before release from the Hayabusa2 orbiter. It was deployed anyway on 2 October 2019 in orbit around Ryugu to perform gravitational measurements. It impacted the asteroid a few days after release.

On 13 November 2019, commands were sent to Hayabusa2 to leave Ryugu and begin its journey back to Earth. On 6 December 2020 (Australian time), a capsule containing the samples landed in Australia and after a brief search was retrieved.

Prior to the sample capsule return, the amount of sample was expected to be at least 0.1 g. The description of overall bulk sample was planned to be done by JAXA in the first six months. 5 wt% of the sample will be allocated for the detailed analysis by JAXA. 15 wt% will be allocated for initial analysis, and 10 wt% for "phase 2" analysis among Japanese research groups. Within a year, NASA (10 wt%) and international "phase 2" research groups (5 wt%) will receive their allotment. 15 wt% will be allocated for research proposals by international Announcement of Opportunity. 40 wt% of the sample will be stored unused for future analysis.

After the sample capsule returned, the amount of retrieved sample turned out to be about 5.4 g. Since it was 50 times more than anticipated, the allotment plan was adjusted to: 2 wt% to the detailed analysis by JAXA; 6 wt% for the initial analysis; 4 wt% for the "phase 2" analysis by Japanese research groups; 10 wt% for NASA; 2 wt% for the international "phase 2" research groups; 1 wt% for the public outreach; 15 wt% for the international Announcement of Opportunity; and the remaining 60 wt% will be preserved for future analysis.

== In popular culture ==
162173 Ryugu is the setting of Daniel Suarez's novel Delta-V, describing the adventures of eight space miners who explore near-Earth asteroid Ryugu.

== See also ==
- List of minor planets and comets visited by spacecraft
- 101955 Bennu
