= Bitter Springs anomaly =

The Bitter Springs anomaly (BSA) represents a sharp drop in δ^{13}C_{carb} concentrations on average by 8‰, for 8 million years during the Tonian period. This marks a noticeable deviation from the relatively high values of the time. The anomaly is named after the Bitter Springs formation in Australia where it was first documented. It has since been found in several other locations worldwide including Norway, Greenland, and Canada, all in carbonate platform environments.

== Geology of the anomaly ==
The first documentation of the BSA in Australia is present between 30 and 60 meters. Lithology here varies between halite, gypsum, dolomite, stromatolite dolomites and limestones. Here δ^{13}C_{carb} fluctuates from upwards of 6‰ down to −4‰. In North-Western Canada, the BSA is contained within the Ram Head formation, which has been confined to 1005–775 Myrs in age via zircon dating. The anomaly spans a section of approximately 175 meters, marked by high energy stromatolite and ooid deposits. δ^{13}C_{carb} values drop on average from 7‰ to −2‰. In Norway and Greenland it is present within the Grusdievbreen to Svanbergfjellet formations of the Akademikerbreen group. Values range from 6‰ to −3‰. Here more precise dating shows the anomaly to have occurred from 810 to 802 Myrs. In Norway the anomaly is represented by a 250-meter section as opposed to a mere 22 meters in Greenland. Both are of the same carbonate ramps to rimmed carbonate platform deposits of limestone and dolostone. Notably, the anomaly is associated with flooding plains in Canada, and the Scandinavian manifestations are capped by sub-aerial exposure surfaces on both ends.

== Mechanisms and controversies ==
Several mechanisms for the anomaly have been proposed. Iodine ratio analysis has been used to suggest a shift towards euxenic ocean conditions during the time of the anomaly. This represents a shift of some kind in oceanic chemistry. It is possible the BSA relates to the proliferation of eukaryotic life, as evidence for their ecological importance seems to only appear afterwards. Evidence supports the possibility of large paleomagnetic shifts of 55 degrees around the time of the anomaly. This has been tentatively linked to tectonic activity associated with the breakup of the super continent Rodinia. Such events would have had a large impact on the oceans, possibly reflected in the observed sea level changes and deep sea upwelling.

As only several formations are known to document the anomaly at this time, it is still unknown if it was global or constrained to shallower depths of carbonate platforms. More instances of the BSA would have to be documented before such a conclusion could be reached.

The BSA broadly resembles other Tonian δ^{13}C_{carb} excursions, whose causes are often tied to both glaciation and the proliferation of eukaryotes.
