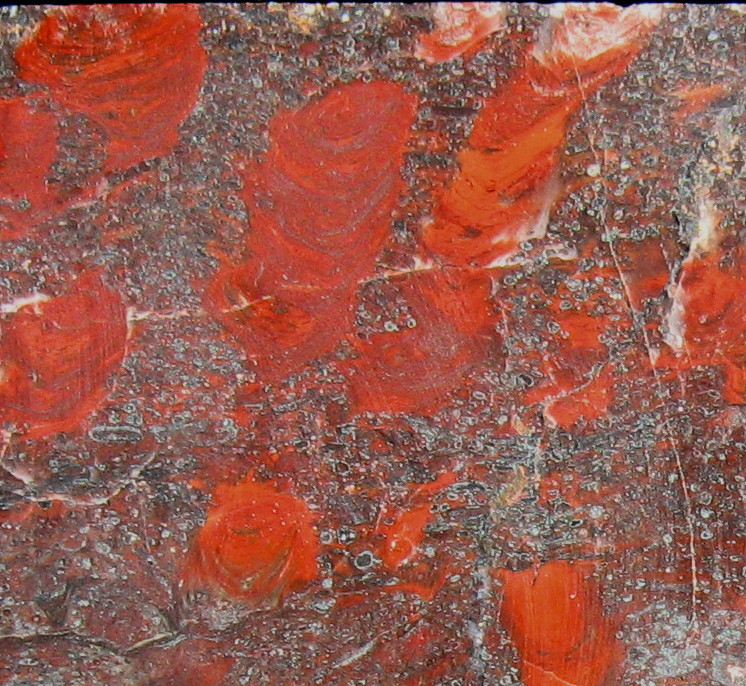
- Section of Collenia undosa stromatolite from 2110 million year old banded iron formation, Biwabik
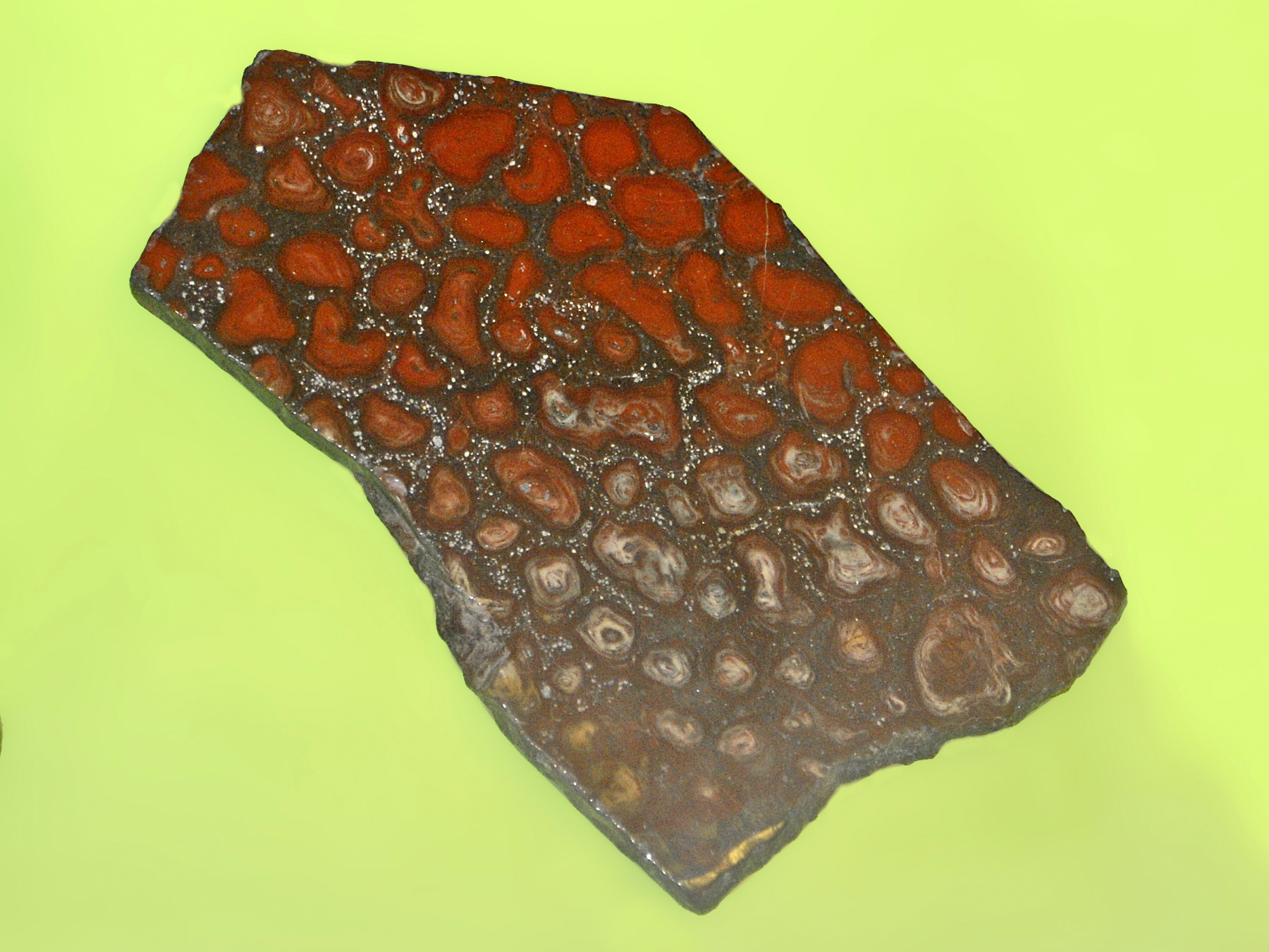
- Collenia undosa stromatolite from Precambrian of United States

Scientific classification
- Domain: Bacteria
- Kingdom: Bacillati
- Phylum: Cyanobacteriota
- Class: incertae sedis
- Genus: †Collenia; Walcott 1914

Type species
- †Collenia undosa

Species
- †C. frequens; †C. symmetrica; †C. undosa

= Collenia =

Collenia Temporal range: Siderian–Rhyacian, 2400–2100 Ma

Extinct genus of cyanobacteria

Collenia is genus of fossil cyanobacteria that form a particular type of stromatolites.

== Description ==
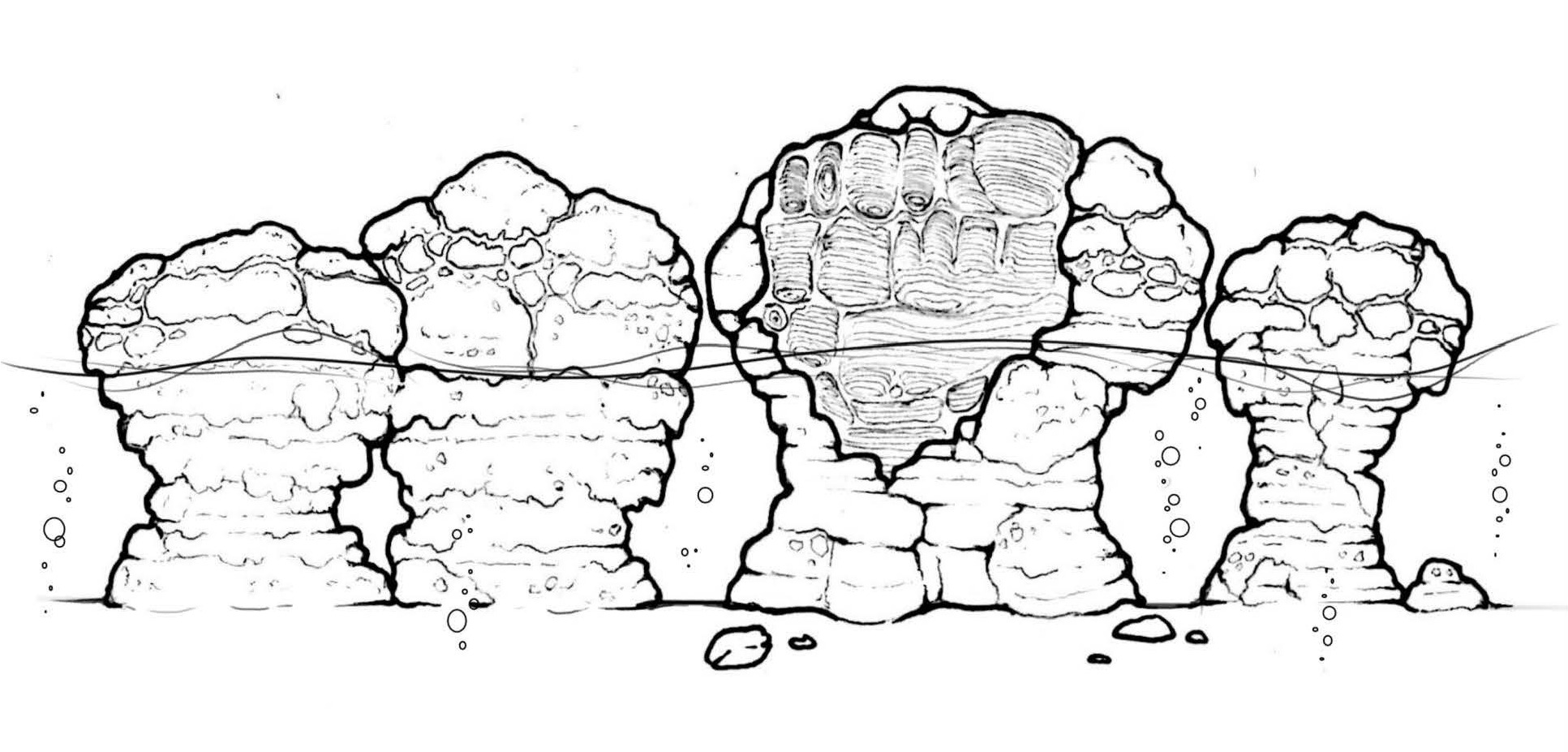
Life restoration

Collenia are stromatolites made up of convex layers flattened in the center, forming columnar colonies. The microorganisms involved were likely photosynthetic bacteria expiring oxygen.

== Fossil record ==
Collenia stromatolites were very common in the Paleoproterozoic era during the Siderian and Rhyacian periods, about 2.2 to 2.4 billion years ago.

== See also ==
- List of fossil stromatolites
