= Bitter Springs type preservation =

Preservation mode of microorganisms in silica

The Bitter Springs preservational mode is the preservation of microorganisms in silica, in shallow Precambrian waters.

== Taphonomic processes ==
Silica is emplaced around the organisms very rapidly, before their cells can even collapse; the strong silica withstands great pressures and preserves three-dimensional detail even after metamorphosis. Microbial mats, as they decayed, acted as nuclei for silica precipitation.

== Occurrence ==
The preservational mode is only present in the Precambrian, and is restricted to shallow or tidal waters. After this point, organisms such as sponges extracted silica from the oceans in order to construct tests (skeletons), with the result that the surface oceans no longer became supersaturated with respect to silica when evaporation condensed the mineral.

== Constraints ==
Because microbial mats and shallow, supersaturated seas were necessary for the formation of this form of deposit, larger eukaryotic organisms could not survive in the regions in which these deposits were formed; hence the record is mainly restricted to bacteria.
