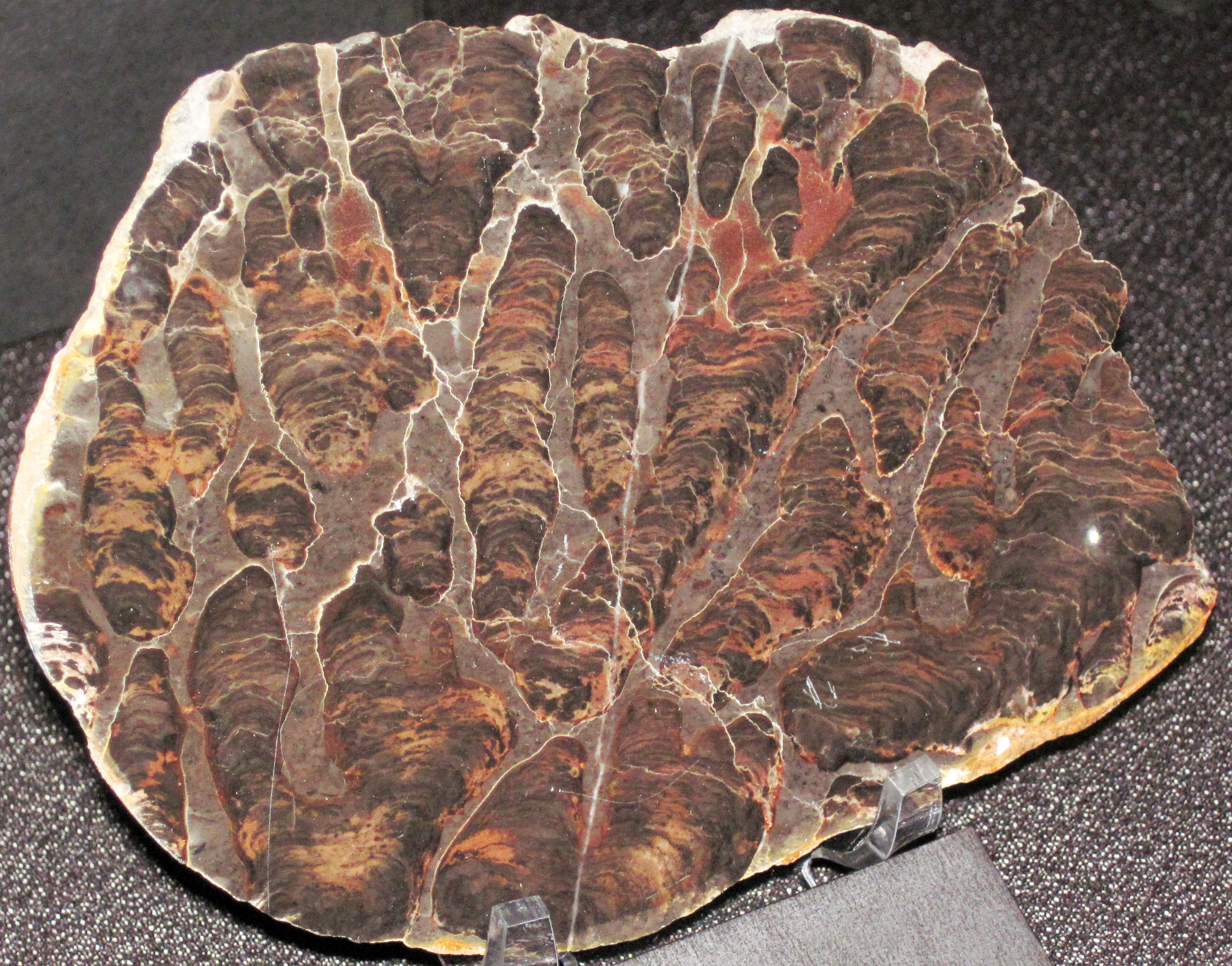
- Fossilized I. intia stromatolite from the Northern Territory in Australia.

Scientific classification
- Domain: Bacteria
- Kingdom: Bacillati
- Phylum: Cyanobacteriota
- Class: Cyanophyceae
- Genus: †Inzeria; I.N.Krylov, 1963

Type species
- †I. tjomusii I.N.Krylov 1963

Species
- †I. confragosa (Semikhatov) Raaben 1969; †I. conjuncta W.V.Preiss 1973; †I. groenlandica Bertrand-Sarfati & Caby 1976; †I. intia M.R.Walter 1972; †I. multiplex W.V.Preiss 1973; †I. ny-frislandica Raaben 1969; †I. sinopivarra Bertrand-Sarfati & Siedlecka 1980; †I. tjomusii I.N.Krylov 1963; †I. toctogulii I.N.Krylov 1967

= Inzeria =

Inzeria Temporal range: 1000–600 Ma

Genus of Neoproterozoic cyanobacteria

Inzeria is a genus of fossil stromatolite-forming cyanobacteria from the late Riphean stage of the Neoproterozoic era. There are currently 9 accepted species.

== See also ==
- List of fossil stromatolites
