= (10302) 1989 ML =

Near-Earth asteroid

- 1989 ML photographed by the Canada–France–Hawaii Telescope in December 2015

Discovery
- Discovered by: E. F. Helin, J. Alu
- Discovery site: Palomar Observatory, United States
- Discovery date: 29 June 1989

Designations
- Alternative designations: 1992 WA
- Minor planet category: Amor; NEO

Orbital characteristics
- Epoch 21 November 2025 (JD 2461000.5)
- Uncertainty parameter 0
- Observation arc: 12250 days (33.54 yr)
- Aphelion: 1.4470 AU (216.47 Gm)
- Perihelion: 1.0985 AU (164.33 Gm)
- Semi-major axis: 1.2728 AU (190.41 Gm)
- Eccentricity: 0.1369
- Orbital period (sidereal): 1.436 yr (524.518 d)
- Average orbital speed: 26.28 km/s
- Mean anomaly: 121.513°
- Mean motion: 0° 41^{m} 11.911^{s} / day
- Inclination: 4.379°
- Longitude of ascending node: 104.272°
- Argument of perihelion: 183.625°
- Earth MOID: 0.08233 AU

Physical characteristics
- Dimensions: 0.276±0.037 km
- Synodic rotation period: 19.228 h (0.8012 d)
- Geometric albedo: 0.37±0.15
- Spectral type: X-type; E-type
- Absolute magnitude (H): 19.45 (JPL)

(10302) 1989 ML is an unnamed near-Earth asteroid located in the inner Solar System. It is relatively small, estimated to be around 300 metres (980 ft) in diameter. An Amor asteroid, it orbits between Earth and Mars. It is an X-type asteroid, so its precise surface composition is yet unknown, though telescopic observations indicate it may be relatively enriched in iron. It was discovered by Eleanor F. Helin and Jeff T. Alu at Palomar Observatory on 29 June 1989. 1989 ML was the former backup target for Japan's Hayabusa mission, but launch delays meant that the rendezvous had to be cancelled.

== Orbit ==
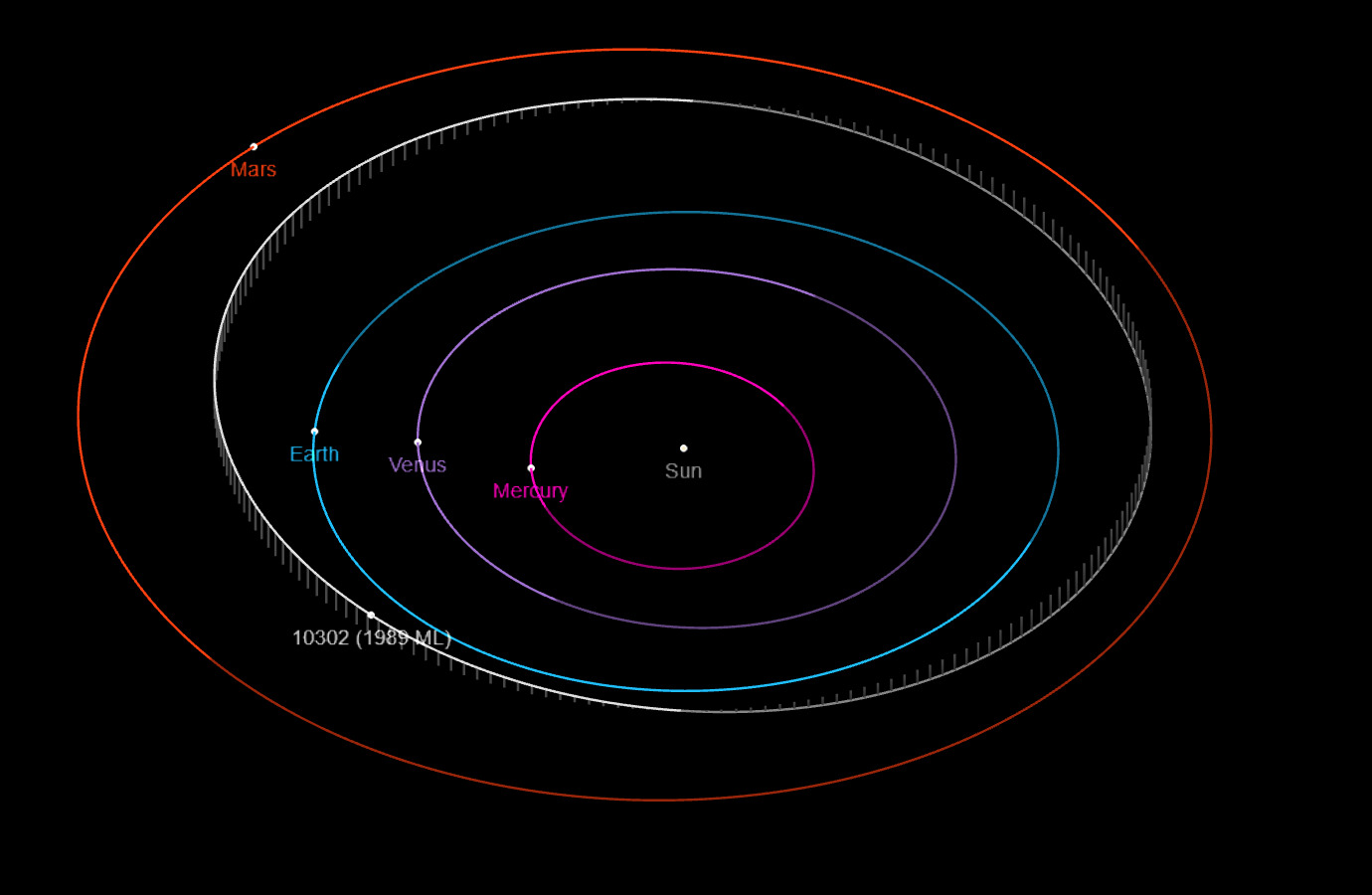
A diagram of 1989 ML's orbit, with the orbits of the inner planets shown.

1989 ML is classified as a near-Earth object (NEO) and an Amor asteroid, meaning that its orbit never crosses the Earth's. It has a semi-major axis of 1.273 astronomical units (AU), completing an orbit around the Sun every 1.436 years (524.518 days). It has a moderately elliptical orbit with an orbital eccentricity of 0.137, with its distance from the Sun varying from 1.0985 AU to 1.273 AU. 1989 ML has a relatively low orbital inclination of 4.379° with respect to the ecliptic plane. Its proximity to Earth means that 1989 ML's orbit is strongly perturbed and chaotic; the Lyapunov time of its orbit is roughly 1,000 years.

== Physical characteristics ==
In 2007, a team of astronomers led by Michael Mueller used observations from the Spitzer Space Telescope to estimate 1989 ML's physical properties. Adopting an absolute magnitude value of 19.5±0.3, Mueller et al. derived a diameter of 0.246 ± 0.037 kilometres (0.153 ± 0.023 mi). Analysis of 1989 ML's lightcurve, or fluctuations in its observed brightness, indicate that it rotates once every 19.228 hours and has a tumbling rotation. The high amplitude of its lightcurve implies that it may be very elongated, with its longest axis being at least 2.2 times longer than its intermediate axis.

=== Spectrum and surface ===
Spectroscopic observations conducted by Palomar Observatory in 1999 revealed that 1989 ML has a relatively flat (or neutral) spectrum. As a result, a definitive interpretation of its surface composition could not be made, though its spectrum was noted to resemble dark, impact-shocked chondrites. Due to its neutral spectrum, 1989 ML was classified as an Xc-type asteroid under the Bus classification scheme, suggesting that it belongs to the E-type, M-type, or P-type classifications under the Tholen classification scheme. These asteroid types are spectrally degenerate, meaning that they can only be distinguished from each other by albedo. E-type asteroids have relatively high geometric albedos of 0.3–0.6; M-type asteroids have moderate albedos of 0.1–0.2; and P-type asteroids have dark albedos below 0.1, appearing to be rich in organic compounds.

Mueller et al. estimated 1989 ML's geometric albedo to be 0.37±0.15, suggesting an E-type classification and ruling out a P-type classification. 1989 ML's optical and near-infrared colors were additionally compared to other asteroids, demonstrating that they differed from the color data of M-type and P-type asteroids. They also differed from the colors of the E-type asteroids 64 Angelina and 3103 Eger, but agreed with the color of 44 Nysa, another E-type asteroid. Nysa-type spectra are consistent with silicate mineralogy enriched in iron, whilst Angelina-type spectra are consistent with silicates containing sulfides, indicating that 1989 ML is relatively enriched in iron.

== Exploration ==
1989 ML is an attractive target for spacecraft exploration due to its relative accessibility from Earth. It was considered as a backup target of JAXA's sample-return mission Hayabusa (then MUSES-C), with the primary target being 4660 Nereus. However, both targets had to be given up due to launch delays. Hayabusa would instead go on to rendezvous with 25143 Itokawa in 2005. 1989 ML was also considered by the European Space Agency as a candidate target for the Don Quijote mission concept to study the effects of impacting a spacecraft into an asteroid; however, they too changed to other targets.

== See also ==
- List of minor planets and comets visited by spacecraft
