= 44 Nysa =

Main-belt asteroid

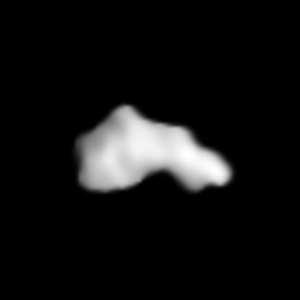
- Nysa photographed by the Large Binocular Telescope on 15 February 2026

Discovery
- Discovered by: Hermann Goldschmidt
- Discovery site: Paris, France
- Discovery date: 27 May 1857

Designations
- Pronunciation: /ˈnaɪsə/
- Named after: Nysa (nymph) (Note: According to sources from the 1800s, the asteroid was named after the nymph and daughter of Aristaeus who raised the god Dionysus (Bacchus). On the other hand, in the Dictionary of Minor Planet Names from the 2000s, astronomer Lutz D. Schmadel claimed that the asteroid was named after the mythical land of Nysa, where Dionysus (Bacchus) was raised by nymphs. Schmadel's claim was cited in a 2026 paper by Minker et al. and was propagated in press releases and news reports on the aforementioned paper.)
- Alternative designations: A857 KA · 1977 CE
- Minor planet category: Main belt (inner) · Nysa–Polana complex (interloper)
- Adjectives: Nysian /ˈnɪsiən/

Orbital characteristics
- Epoch 9 June 2026 (JD 2461200.5)
- Uncertainty parameter 0
- Aphelion: 2.785 AU
- Perihelion: 2.060 AU
- Semi-major axis: 2.422 AU
- Eccentricity: 0.1497
- Orbital period (sidereal): 3.77 yr (1,377 d)
- Mean anomaly: 41.457°
- Mean motion: 0° 15^{m} 41.046^{s} / day
- Inclination: 3.713°
- Longitude of ascending node: 131.476°
- Argument of perihelion: 343.893°
- Known satellites: 1

Proper orbital elements
- Proper semi-major axis: 2.423 AU
- Proper eccentricity: 0.174
- Proper inclination: 3.06°
- Proper mean motion: 95.4524 deg / yr
- Proper orbital period: 3.77151 yr (1377.545 d)
- Precession of perihelion long.: 41.2913 arcsec / yr
- Precession of asc. node: −46.3579 arcsec / yr

Physical characteristics
- Dimensions: 113 km × 67 km × 65 km; (±15% uncertainty)
- Mean diameter: 75+3 −1 km (volume equivalent)
- Mass: (5.76±1.43)×10^{17} kg (Note: Fuentes-Muñoz et al. (2025) give Nysa's mass in terms of the standard gravitational parameter GM = 0.038444658±0.009560725 km^{3} s^{−2} (or after converting to SI units, (3.8444658±0.9560725)×10^{7} m^{3} s^{−2}). This can be converted into mass (M) by dividing GM (in SI units) by the gravitational constant G = 6.6743×10^{−11} m^{3}⋅kg^{−1}⋅s^{−2}. The resulting mass of Nysa is approximately M = (5.76±1.43)×10^{17} kg.)
- Mean density: > 3 g/cm^{3} (Note: Minker et al. (2026) says that Nysa's density is at least 3 g/cm^{3}. Given Nysa's volume-equivalent sphere diameter of D = 75+3 −1 km from Minker et al. (2026) and mass of M = (5.76±1.43)×10^{17} kg from Fuentes-Muñoz et al. (2025), the density formula gives $\rho {{=}} \frac{M}{V} {{=}} \frac{M}{\frac{4}{3} \pi (D/2)^3} \approx (2600 \pm 700) \text{ kg/m}^3 \approx (2.6 \pm 0.7) \text{ g/cm}^3$.)
- Sidereal rotation period: 6.4214175±0.0000005 h
- Axial tilt: 34.7°±0.5° (to ecliptic) (Note: The ecliptic latitude β is the angle offset from the ecliptic plane (β = 0°), while the axial tilt (obliquity i) with respect to the ecliptic is the angle offset from the ecliptic north pole (β = +90°). Nysa's ecliptic obliquity of i = 34.7° is calculated by subtracting its rotation pole's ecliptic latitude of β = +55.3° from the ecliptic north pole's latitude of β = +90°: i = +90°−(55.3°) = 34.7°.)
- Pole ecliptic longitude: 102.7°±0.5°
- Pole ecliptic latitude: +55.3°±0.5°
- Geometric albedo: 0.48 (average)
- Spectral type: E(III) (iron-bearing enstatite); E (Tholen); Xn (Bus–DeMeo) (Note: Nysa was previously classified as an Xc-type asteroid in the Bus–DeMeo classification system, but was later reclassified as an Xn-type asteroid. The Xn class was introduced to the Bus–DeMeo system in 2019.)
- Apparent magnitude: 9 to 12
- Absolute magnitude (H): 6.75

44 Nysa is an asteroid located in the inner region of the main asteroid belt. It is the largest, brightest, and first confirmed E-type asteroid, (Note: Tatsumi et al. (2026) provide a list of confirmed and candidate E-type asteroids (high-albedo X-type asteroids) in Appendix A (Table A.1). In that table, Nysa has the smallest absolute magnitude (H) value of all confirmed E-type asteroids, meaning it is the brightest and largest known member. Although the high-albedo X-type asteroid 92 Undina is brighter and larger than Nysa, it has not been confirmed as an E-type asteroid.) a rare type of asteroid with a highly reflective surface rich in enstatite. It was discovered by Hermann Goldschmidt in Paris, France on 27 May 1857 and was named after the nymph who raised the god Dionysus in Greek mythology. Nysa has one small moon which was discovered in 2026 and has not yet been named.

High-resolution imaging in 2026 revealed that Nysa has a highly concave and irregular shape, with three apparent lobes carved by several massive valleys and craters. Astronomers believe that it most likely resulted from the slow agglomeration of three asteroids—making Nysa a contact trinary. The asteroid has a uniform surface color and rotates with a period of 6.42 hours.

The origin of Nysa is uncertain. It probably did not experience any destructive collision events, as it is not known to host a family of asteroids sharing similar orbits and compositions. However, some small near-Earth asteroids including 2015 TC25 and 1998 KY26 have been suspected of being escaped fragments of Nysa. The asteroid orbits the Sun in the same region as the Nysa–Polana complex, a group of overlapping asteroid families. Despite the Nysa–Polana complex's name, researchers generally do not consider it related to Nysa due to their different compositions.

== History ==
=== Discovery and naming ===
Nysa was discovered by German–French astronomer Hermann Goldschmidt in Paris, France on the night of 27 May 1857. He made the discovery using a 4-inch (10 cm) telescope, which was usually stationed at the upper floor of either his apartment or studio. Goldschmidt spotted the asteroid as a star-like object in the constellation Libra, (Note: The JPL Horizons On-Line Ephemeris System says Nysa was in the constellation Libra at the time of discovery, which corroborates this claim.) at an apparent magnitude of 10.1. Although the weather became poor afterwards, Goldschmidt was able to reobserve Nysa on 1 June. He reported his discovery to the Astronomische Nachrichten via telegram and announced it as the 44th planet (Note: Asteroids were considered a type of small planet in the 19th century.) on the next day. It was his sixth asteroid discovery. (Note: In chronological order, Goldschmidt's first five asteroid discoveries were: 21 Lutetia, 32 Pomona, 36 Atalante, 40 Harmonia, and 41 Daphne.)

Over the next few weeks, Goldschmidt and other astronomers took additional observations of Nysa, allowing for the calculation of the asteroid's orbit and ephemerides. In the meantime, Goldschmidt continued discovering new asteroids, beginning with 45 Eugenia on 27 June 1857. Earlier that month, he had asked German polymath Alexander von Humboldt to suggest a name for the 44th asteroid. Humboldt chose the name Nysa, (Note: The name is also spelled "Nyssa" in some of the earliest references, as in an article in the French journal Cosmos from July 1857.) after the nymph and daughter of Aristaeus who raised the god Dionysus (also known as Bacchus) in Greek mythology. In a letter responding to Goldschmidt, Humboldt expressed his honor of naming Nysa and praised Goldschmidt's discovery on behalf of astronomers Johann Franz Encke, Karl Christian Bruhns, Heinrich Louis d'Arrest, and Franz Brünnow. Humboldt's choice of name was announced to Goldschmidt in a separate letter by Encke.

Nysa never received a planetary symbol, as their use had fallen out of favor due to the increasing rate of asteroid discoveries in the 1850s. Nysa was instead represented by its minor planet number 44 (enclosed in parentheses), which historically meant it was the 44th asteroid discovered. This became the modern minor-planet designation scheme where the asteroid's number is prefixed to its name, as in (44) Nysa or 44 Nysa.

=== Observational characterization ===
In terms of apparent magnitude from Earth, Nysa ranks among the top 40 brightest main-belt asteroids. Its apparent magnitude ranges from 9 to 12 depending on its phase angle and distance from Earth. Although Nysa is too faint to be seen with the naked eye, it could be observed with a pair of binoculars or through a telescope with a moderate aperture size (at least 3 to 6 inches or 8 to 15 cm). Because of its brightness, Nysa has attracted numerous observational studies.

In 1913, astronomers began suspecting that Nysa exhibits brightness variations over short periods. This was confirmed by Emilio Bianchi and E. Padova in 1920, who plotted Nysa's light curve for the first time and measured a period of 3.2 hours. By the 1950s, astronomers recognized that the 3.2-hour period is actually half of Nysa's rotation period. The direction of Nysa's rotation axis was determined by 1962.

During the 1970s, astronomers began measuring the diameters of asteroids for the first time via infrared radiometry. This led to the first measurement of Nysa's diameter and albedo, revealing it to be a small and highly reflective object. In 1975, polarimetry and color measurements revealed that Nysa had an enstatite-rich surface unlike any previously observed asteroid. Two more asteroids—64 Angelina and 434 Hungaria—were later found to share similar compositions as Nysa, which led astronomers to introduce the E-type asteroid classification for these objects in 1977.

In 1979, astronomers pointed out that Nysa's light curve resembles that of the contact binary star W Ursae Majoris, which raised suspicions that the asteroid might be a binary or contact binary. This prompted an international campaign for observing Nysa later that year. Although the 1979 campaign was unable to confirm Nysa's binarity, it provided more accurate measurements of the asteroid's rotation period and axis direction. Subsequent studies using light curves, radar observations, interferometric imaging, and stellar occultations all hinted that Nysa's shape must be elongated, lopsided, (Note: Described as "cone-shaped" in light curve studies.) and concave, but could not conclude whether it is a contact binary.

Nysa was first imaged in detail in 2026, through the use of large ground-based telescopes (Large Binocular Telescope and Very Large Telescope) equipped with adaptive optics. The images revealed that Nysa has a three-lobed shape and a tiny moon; the shape was reported by a team of astronomers led by Kate Minker in February 2026, while the moon's discovery was reported later by a team led by Anthony Berdeu in May 2026. The finalized results were later announced in an August 2026 press release by the Lowell Observatory.

== Orbit ==
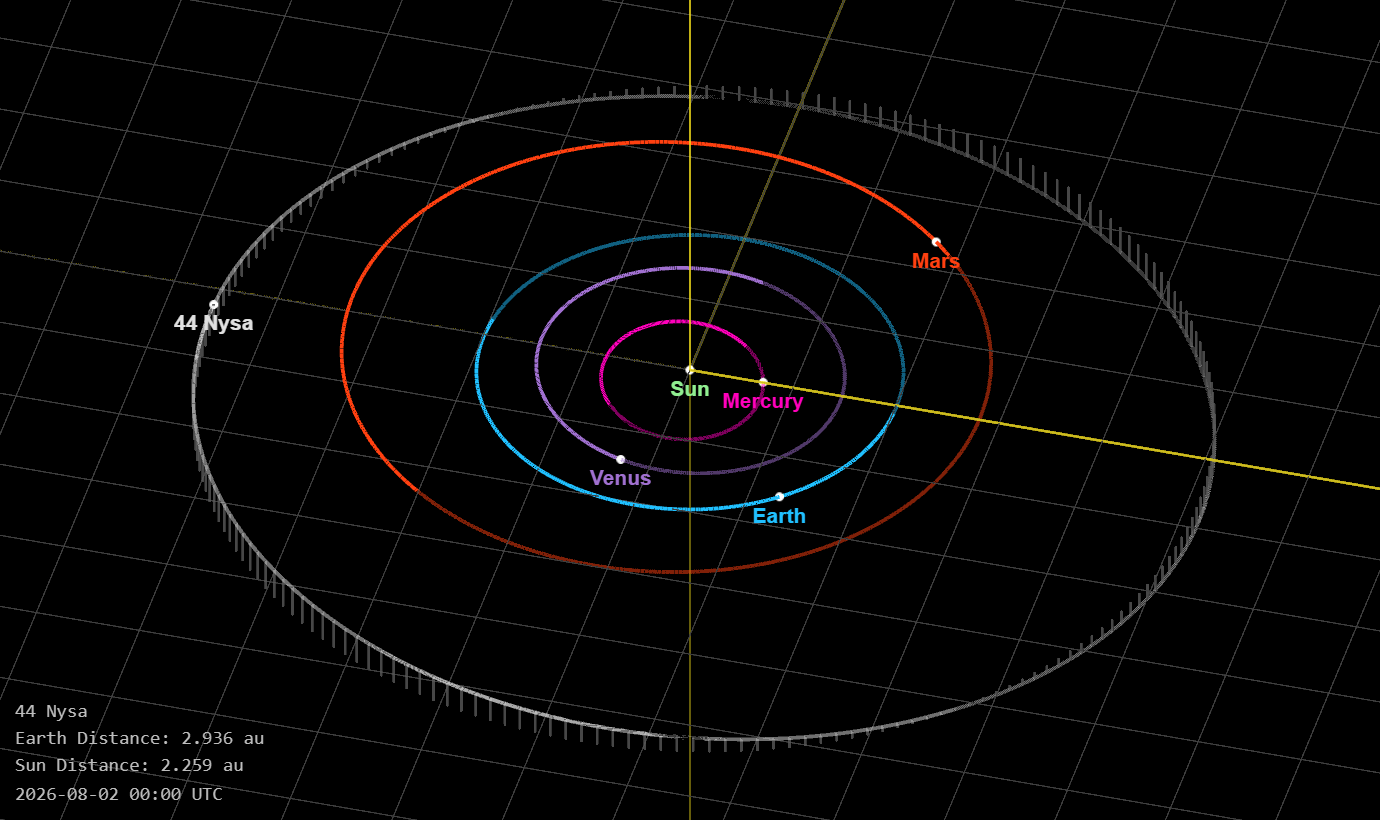
Diagram showing the orbits of Nysa and the inner Solar System planets

Nysa is located in the main asteroid belt between the orbits of Mars and Jupiter. Specifically, it is in the inner region of the main belt, where the outer edge is cut off by the 3:1 mean-motion orbital resonance with Jupiter. Nysa follows an elliptical orbit around the Sun with a semi-major axis of 2.42 astronomical units (AU) and an orbital period of 3.77 Earth years. Its current orbit brings it within 2.1 AU of Sun at perihelion to 2.8 AU at aphelion, with an eccentricity of 0.15 and a low inclination of 3.7° with respect to the ecliptic. Over millions of years, Nysa's orbital elements vary and average out with a proper eccentricity of 0.17 and a proper inclination of 3.1°.

Nysa orbits within a densely populated region of the inner main belt, where several asteroid families including the Nysa–Polana complex and Massalia family can be found. Nysa occasionally passes close enough to other asteroids to show noticeable gravitational perturbations. For example, in April 1988, astronomers observed Nysa pass within 0.037 AU (5.5 million km; 3.4 million mi) of 20 Massalia.

== Physical characteristics ==
=== Size and shape ===
Surface features of Nysa (Note: All information in this table is sourced from Table R.1 of Minker et al. (2026).)
Label	Type	Width (km)	Depth (km)
A	Crater/secondary basin	38	6
B	Crater	20	
C	Crater	35	
D	Crater	21	
E	Southern cavity	53	17
F	Northern cavity	44	5
G	Crater	17	
H	Crater	8	
I	Collum/Valley		
J	Collum/Valley		

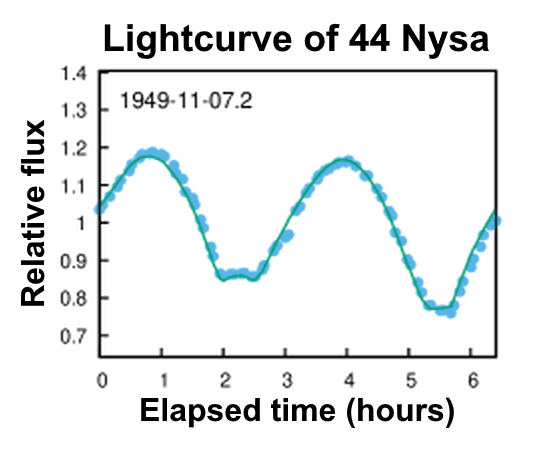
Top row: Animated time lapse of Nysa rotating, as seen in Large Binocular Telescope photographs (left) versus a rendered 3D shape model (right).
Bottom row: Light curve of Nysa, showing two brightness peaks per 6.42-hour rotation.

Nysa is an elongated object with dimensions of 113 km × 67 km × 65 km (70 mi × 42 mi × 40 mi) (15% uncertainty for each axis). When treated as a sphere, Nysa's has a volume equivalent diameter of 75+3
−1 km (47+2
−1 mi). Long-term measurements of perturbations in the trajectories of other asteroids indicate that Nysa has a mass of (5.76±1.43)×10^{17} kg. The asteroid is expected to have a bulk density of at least 3 g/cm^{3}, similar to other asteroids and meteorites that share Nysa's composition. This density is higher than that of a typical main-belt asteroid, which may indicate an internal structure consisting of compact (low porosity) rock or a metal-rich core.

Nysa's shape is extremely irregular and more concave than any previously observed asteroid. High-resolution imaging by telescopes has shown that Nysa is carved by ten major indentations, which researchers have alphabetically labeled A to J. These include two deep valleys (labeled I and J), which divide the asteroid into three distinct lobes. These valleys wrap around the asteroid's circumference and make the lobes appear connected by narrow necks, called "colli". At least five craters have been identified on Nysa, with diameters ranging from 8 to 35 km (5.0 to 21.7 mi). Nysa additionally has two major cavities at its south and north poles (labeled E and F, respectively), with E being 53 km (33 mi) wide and 17 km (11 mi) deep and F being 44 km (27 mi) wide and 5 km (3.1 mi) deep. A possible crater or secondary basin, labeled A, lies next to F between Nysa's smallest lobes with a width of 38 km (24 mi) and a depth of 6 km (3.7 mi).

The origin of Nysa's shape is uncertain; it could either be the result of multiple large asteroid impacts or the slow agglomeration of three asteroids 20 to 60 km (12 to 37 mi) in size. The latter scenario would suggest that Nysa is a contact trinary—making it the first such object discovered. Astronomers believe that this is the most likely case, since impacts alone could not explain the asteroid's valleys. Nevertheless, impacts still play a role in reshaping Nysa, particularly in the creation of impact craters which appear as small concavities.

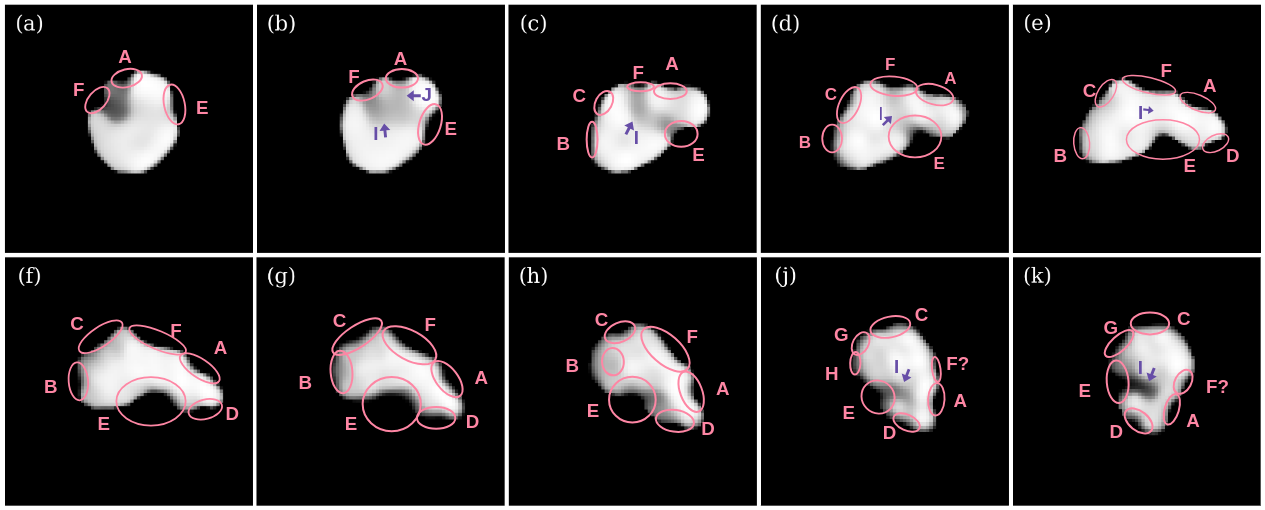
Resolved images of Nysa, with concavities labeled A to J. Valleys are labeled I and J, while non-crater cavities are labeled E and F.

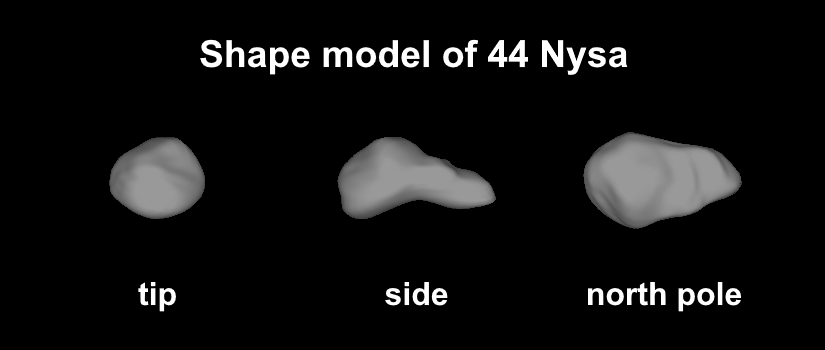
Shape model of Nysa as seen from three different views. In the tip and side views, the rotational north pole points up. This model was constructed from imaging during 2026.

=== Rotation ===
Nysa spins around a fixed axis with a rotation period of approximately 6.42 hours. Its rotation axis crosses through its shortest dimension, with its north pole pointing toward the ecliptic coordinates (λ, β) = (102.7°±0.5°, +55.3°±0.5°). The asteroid's rotation is prograde with an axial tilt of 34.7°±0.5° with respect to the ecliptic. Because of its elongated shape, Nysa's brightness periodically varies as it rotates. Astronomers have exploited this phenomenon to measure Nysa's rotation period since the 1920s. When plotted as a light curve, Nysa's brightness exhibits two rounded peaks and two sharp minima per rotation.

=== Surface and composition ===
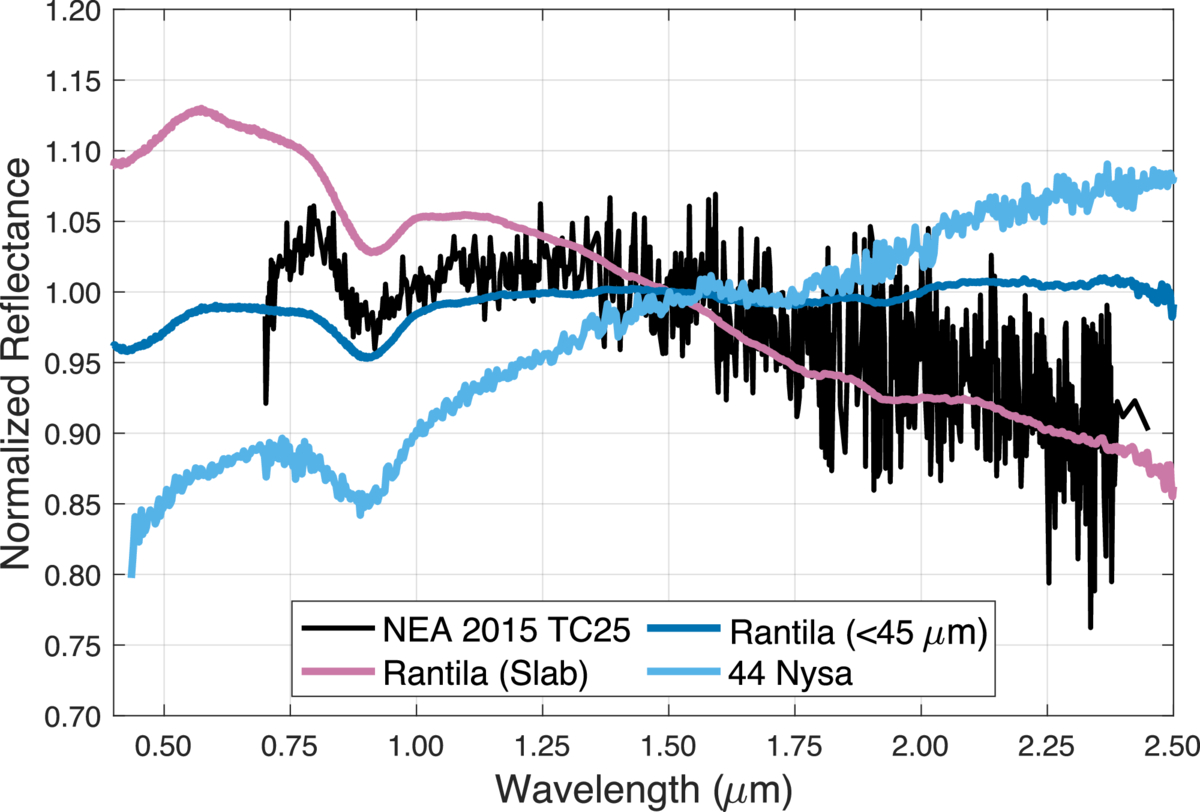
Visible and near-infrared reflectance spectra of Nysa (light blue), the E(III)-type near-Earth asteroid 2015 TC25 (black), and different-sized samples of an aubrite from Rantila (navy and orchid). All objects share the 0.9 μm absorption feature due to pyroxene.

Nysa has a bright, colorless (Note: Nysa's color has been described as "blue", "colorless", or "neutral" with respect to the Sun. This essentially means Nysa reflects similar amounts of light across the visible spectrum, making its color white.) surface rich in enstatite, a reflective silicate mineral that is generally poor in iron. This makes Nysa an E-type asteroid, a relatively rare type of asteroid typically found in the inner main asteroid belt. It is the prototype of the E-type asteroids, being the largest, brightest, and first confirmed member of this group. Nysa and the E-type asteroids are believed to be the parent bodies of enstatite-rich meteorites, which include aubrites and enstatite chondrites.

Estimates of Nysa's visible geometric albedo range from 0.41 to 0.55, with the average being 0.48. Resolved imaging of Nysa has shown that its surface is uniform, with no albedo and color variations greater than 5%. Nysa is thought to have a dense surface regolith like other E-type asteroids due to its high radar albedo and polarization ratio—meaning it reflects and polarizes radar waves in large amounts. As Nysa comes to opposition (phase angle less than 5°), the asteroid's brightness in visible light sharply peaks by about 0.3 magnitudes. Nysa's sharp opposition surge is thought to be caused by coherent backscattering due to fine, submicron-sized particles composing much of its surface.

In visible light, Nysa exhibits a mostly flat reflectance spectrum that slightly increases reflectance at longer (redder) wavelengths. In near-infrared, Nysa absorbs light at wavelengths of 0.9 and 1.8 μm, indicating that its surface contains iron-bearing pyroxene such as orthopyroxene or forsterite. This makes Nysa a member of the E(III) subclass of E-type asteroids, which are thought to be fragments of an igneous parent body that underwent extensive reduction. Nysa and other E-type asteroids are also classified as X-type asteroids, because their visible reflectance spectra are indistinguishable from those of metallic M-type and organic-rich P-type asteroids. In the Bus–DeMeo classification system, Nysa is further classified an Xn-type asteroid because its spectrum exhibits a sharp absorption feature at 0.9 μm.

== Satellite ==
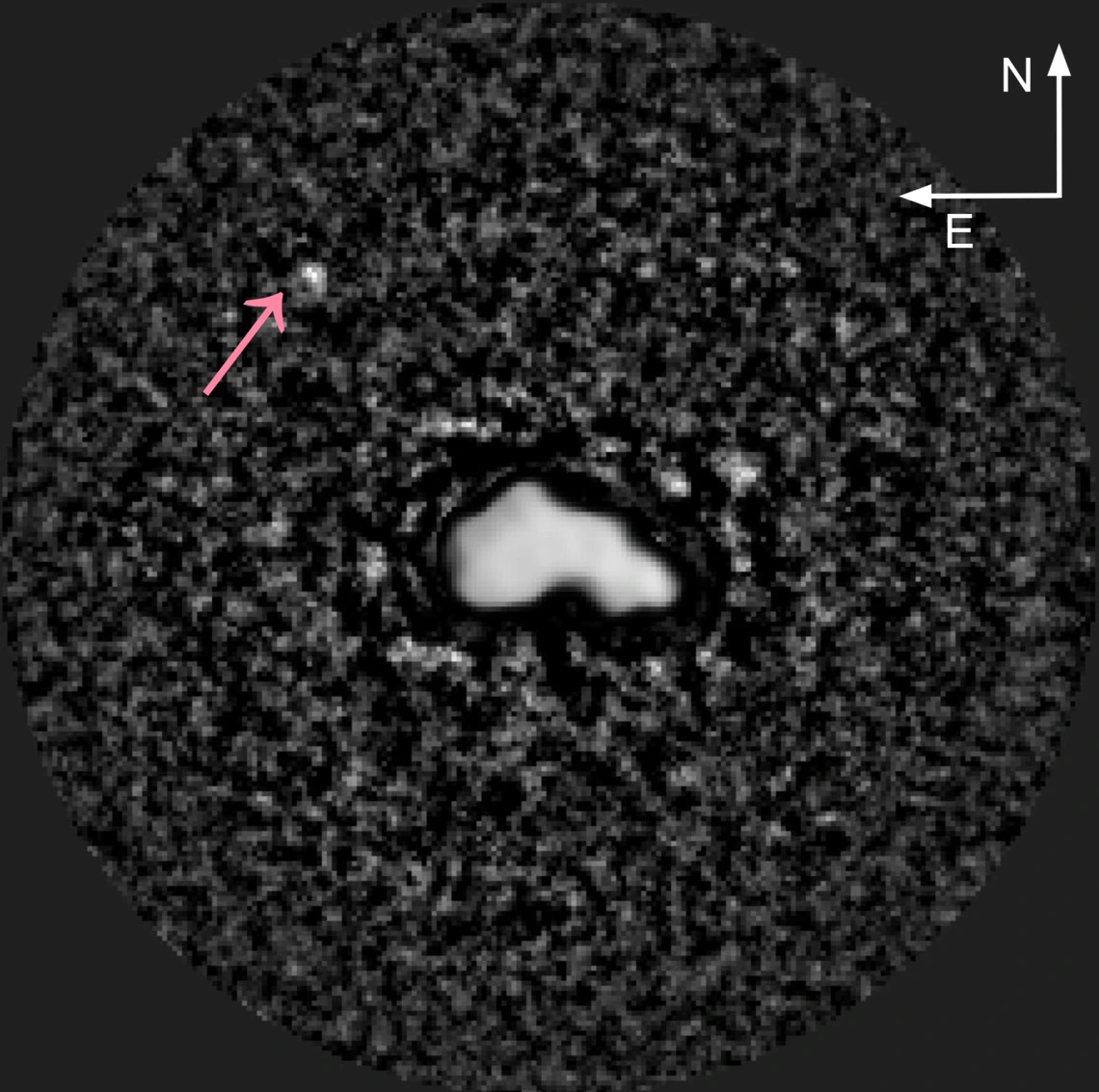
Nysa and its moon (arrow) photographed by the Large Binocular Telescope on 15 February 2026. A low-exposure photo of Nysa is superimposed on top of a grainy long-exposure photo of the moon.

Nysa is classified as a binary asteroid because it has one known moon. The moon of Nysa is unnamed with the informal designation S/2026 (44) 1. It was discovered in 2026 by a team of astronomers led by Anthony Berdeu, (Note: The discoverers of S/2026 (44) 1 include: Anthony Berdeu, Kate Minker, Gianluca Li Causi, Al Conrad, Fernando Pedichini, Simone Antoniucci, Michaël Marsset, Benoit Carry, and Frédéric Vachier. Full names are mentioned in Lowell Observatory's press release.) during analyses of Large Binocular Telescope images of Nysa taken on 15 February and 21 March 2026. The discovery was announced by the Central Bureau of Astronomical Telegrams on 26 May 2026.

S/2026 (44) 1 is significantly fainter than Nysa, having an apparent magnitude difference of about 9. Because of this, the moon is hidden within Nysa's glare, which necessitates the use of advanced image processing techniques to detect it. Assuming the moon has the same albedo as Nysa, its diameter is estimated to be 1.0 ± 0.5 km (0.6 ± 0.3 mi). S/2026 (44) 1 has not been observed long enough to have its orbit determined, though the moon's observed projected separation from Nysa suggests that it orbits at least 180 km (110 mi) away.

== Origin and family ==
Many details about Nysa's origin and collisional history are uncertain, and studies of its shape, composition, and surroundings in the asteroid belt have produced different interpretations.

A 2026 study by Kate Minker and colleagues proposed that Nysa could either be a contact trinary of slowly-merged asteroids or a coherent single body deformed by several large impacts. Of these scenarios, Minker et al. considered the former more likely. In the contact trinary scenario, the three constituent asteroids most likely had a common composition and origin, since Nysa has a uniform present-day surface. However, the origin of these asteroids is unclear: if they are reaccumulated fragments from a destructive collision event, then there should also be many smaller fragments on similar orbits around the Sun, forming an asteroid family. However, no such family sharing Nysa's orbit and composition has been found.

Proper orbital elements (inclination vs. eccentricity) of the Nysa–Polana complex, with each asteroid represented as a circle scaled by diameter and color-coded by albedo. Low-albedo (C-type) asteroids are clustered near 142 Polana, while moderate-albedo (S-type) asteroids are clustered near 135 Hertha. Nysa does not have a cluster of high-albedo asteroids.

Some E-type near-Earth asteroids have been suggested to be escaped fragments of Nysa, due to their similar orbital inclinations and E(III) classification. These include 2015 TC25 and 1998 KY26, both of which are only a few meters in diameter. These asteroids are thought to have migrated from the inner main belt to the near-Earth region via the Yarkovsky effect and ν_{6} secular resonance, which are caused by sunlight and Saturn's apsidal precession, respectively.

Nysa orbits within a region of the asteroid belt populated by multiple overlapping asteroid families, collectively known as the Nysa–Polana complex. The Nysa–Polana complex includes the Hertha family of S-type asteroids, which was historically named the "Nysa family". Despite their names, the Nysa–Polana complex and its "Nysa family" are likely not physically related to Nysa because they have completely different compositions. For this reason, researchers generally consider Nysa an interloper of the Nysa–Polana complex. Nevertheless, some studies have attempted to link Nysa to the complex by proposing that the two originated from compositionally different layers of a collisionally destroyed parent body.

== See also ==
- 216 Kleopatra – a large main-belt asteroid known for its unusually elongated shape and two moons
- Other examples of well-studied E-type main-belt asteroids:
  - 64 Angelina – second-largest confirmed E-type asteroid, after Nysa
  - 317 Roxane – binary E-type asteroid
  - 434 Hungaria – largest member of the Hungaria family, a collisional family of E-type asteroids
  - 2867 Šteins – first E-type asteroid visited by a spacecraft (Rosetta in 2008)
