= Hungaria asteroids =

Group of asteroids in the asteroid belt that orbit the Sun between 1.78 and 2.00AU

A top-down and side view of the positions of Hungaria asteroids outside the orbit of Mars as of 15 May 2026. The box shape of the side view is caused by the high inclination of the group.

The Hungaria asteroids, also known as the Hungaria group, are a dynamical group of asteroids in the asteroid belt which orbit the Sun with a semi-major axis between 1.78 and 2.00 astronomical units (AU). They are the innermost dense concentration of asteroids in the Solar System—the near-Earth asteroids are much more sparse—and derive their name from their largest member 434 Hungaria. The Hungaria group includes the Hungaria family, a collisional asteroid family which dominates its population.

== Description ==
A view of proper elements of asteroids in the asteroid belt, showing inclination versus semi-major axis. Hungaria asteroids are shown enlarged at the top left in orange, inward of the 4:1 Jupiter resonance. The core region of the asteroid belt is shown in white.

The Hungaria asteroids typically share the following orbital parameters:

- Semi-major axis between 1.78 and 2.00 AU
- Orbital period of approximately 2.5 years
- Low eccentricity of below 0.18
- An inclination of 16° to 34°
- Approximate mean-motion resonance with Jupiter of 9:2, and with Mars of 2:3

The 4:1 resonance Kirkwood gap (at 2.06 AU) marks the outer boundary of the Hungaria family, while interactions with Mars determine the inner boundary. For comparison the majority of asteroids are in core region of the asteroid belt, which lies between the 4:1 gap (at 2.06 AU) and the 2:1 gap (at 3.27 AU).

Most Hungaria are E-type asteroids, which means they have extremely bright enstatite surfaces and albedos typically above 0.30. Despite their high albedos, none can be seen with binoculars because they are far too small: the largest (434 Hungaria) is only about 11 km in size. They are, however, the smallest asteroids that can regularly be glimpsed with amateur telescopes.

The origin of the Hungaria group of asteroids is well known. At the 4:1 orbital resonance with Jupiter that lies at semi-major axes of 2.06 AU, any orbiting body is sufficiently strongly perturbed to be forced into an extremely eccentric and unstable orbit, creating the innermost Kirkwood gap. Interior to this 4:1 resonance, asteroids in low inclination orbits are, unlike those outside the 4:1 Kirkwood gap, strongly influenced by the gravitational field of Mars. Here, instead of Jupiter's influence, perturbations by Mars have, over the lifetime of the Solar System, thrown out all asteroids interior to the 4:1 Kirkwood gap except for those far enough from Mars's orbital plane where that planet exerts much smaller forces.

This has left a situation where the only remaining concentration of asteroids inward of the 4:1 resonance lies at high inclination orbits, although they have fairly low eccentricities. However, even at the present time in Solar System history, some Hungaria asteroids cross the orbit of Mars and are still in the process of being ejected from the Solar System due to Mars's influence (unlike asteroids in the "core" of the asteroid belt, where Jupiter's influence predominates).

Long-term changes in the orbit of Mars are believed to be a critical factor in the current removal of Hungaria asteroids. At the highest eccentricities, similar to the extreme values observed today or even slightly greater, Mars will perturb Hungaria asteroids and force them into ever more eccentric and unstable orbits when their ascending node is close in longitude to Mars's aphelion. This ultimately leads over millions of years to the formation of the short-lived Amor asteroids and Earth-crossers.

== E-belt ==
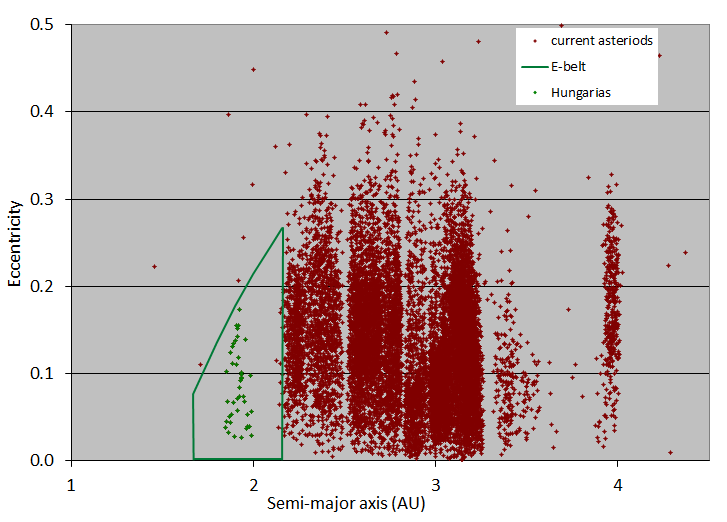
Eccentricity versus semi-major axis: Former location of the hypothetical E-belt asteroids (green outline), with current main belt asteroids (red dots) and Hungaria asteroids (green dots).

The Hungaria asteroids are thought to be the remains of the hypothetical E-belt asteroid population. The dispersal of most of that hypothetical E-belt might have been caused by the outwards migration of the giant planets of the Solar System, according to simulations done under the Nice model. These dispersed E-belt asteroids might in turn have been the impactors of the Late Heavy Bombardment.

== See also ==
- E-type asteroid
- Aubrite
- 434 Hungaria
- 1025 Riema
- 1103 Sequoia
- 1453 Fennia
- 1750 Eckert
- 7187 Isobe
