= 434 Hungaria =

Main-belt asteroid

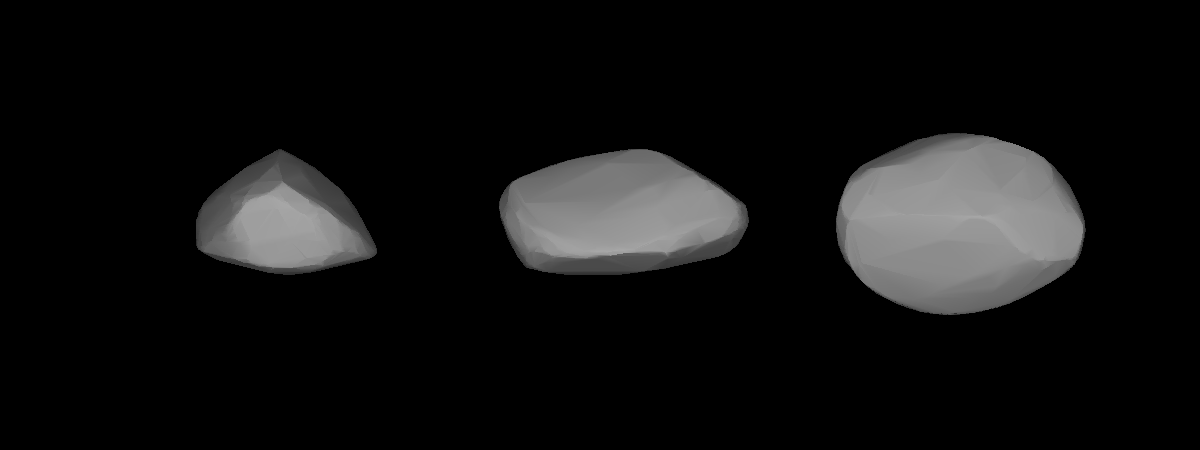
- Lightcurve-based 3D model of 434 Hungaria

Discovery
- Discovered by: Max Wolf
- Discovery date: 11 September 1898

Designations
- Pronunciation: /hʌŋˈɡɛəriə/
- Named after: Hungary
- Alternative designations: 1898 DR
- Minor planet category: Asteroid belt (Hungaria)

Orbital characteristics
- Epoch 31 July 2016 (JD 2457600.5)
- Uncertainty parameter 0
- Observation arc: 117.58 yr (42946 d)
- Aphelion: 2.0878 AU (312.33 Gm)
- Perihelion: 1.8011 AU (269.44 Gm)
- Semi-major axis: 1.9444 AU (290.88 Gm)
- Eccentricity: 0.073725
- Orbital period (sidereal): 2.71 yr (990.34 d)
- Mean anomaly: 221.145°
- Mean motion: 0° 21^{m} 48.636^{s} / day
- Inclination: 22.511°
- Longitude of ascending node: 175.332°
- Argument of perihelion: 123.80°

Physical characteristics
- Dimensions: ~11 km
- Synodic rotation period: 26.521 h (1.1050 d)
- Geometric albedo: 0.428
- Spectral type: E
- Absolute magnitude (H): 11.21

434 Hungaria is a relatively small asteroid orbiting in the inner asteroid belt that is approximately 11 kilometers in diameter. It is an E-type (high-albedo) asteroid. It is the namesake of the Hungaria asteroids, which orbit the Sun on the inside of the 1:4 Kirkwood gap, standing out of the core of the asteroid belt.

It was discovered by Max Wolf on 11 September 1898 at the University of Heidelberg. It was named after Hungary, which hosted an astronomical meeting in 1898 in Budapest.

It is thought that 434 Hungaria, 3103 Eger and the aubrite meteorites may share a common origin.

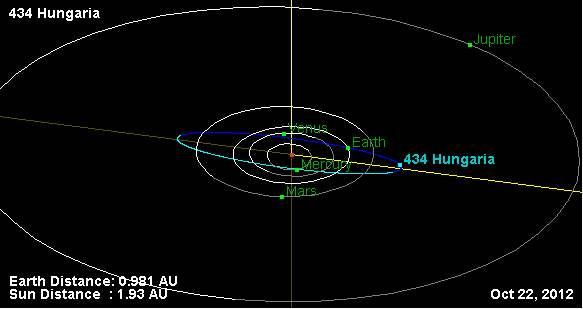
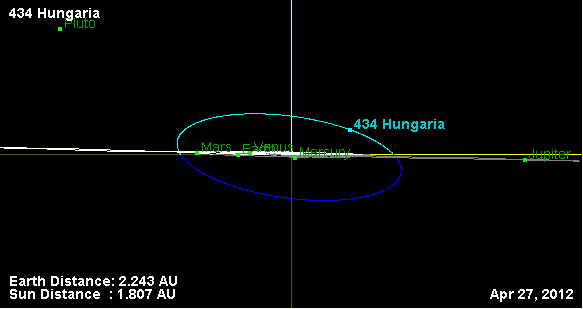
Orbit of 434 Hungaria

== See also ==
- Aubrite
- E-type asteroid
- Hungaria family
- 1025 Riema
- 1103 Sequoia
- 1453 Fennia
- 1750 Eckert
- 7187 Isobe
