= 2015 TC25 =

Small asteroid

2015 TC_{25}
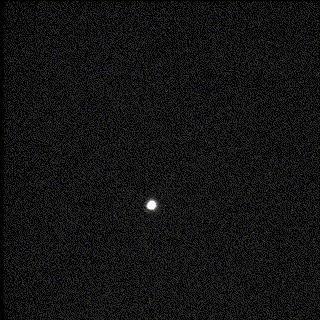

Discovery
- Discovered by: Catalina Sky Survey
- Discovery date: 12 October 2015

Designations
- Minor planet category: Apollo

Orbital characteristics
- Epoch 9 June 2026 (JD 2461200.5)
- Uncertainty parameter 2
- Aphelion: 1.1480 AU
- Perihelion: 0.90881 AU
- Semi-major axis: 1.0284 AU
- Eccentricity: 0.11629
- Orbital period (sidereal): 1.0429 yr (380.93 d)
- Mean anomaly: 10.428°
- Mean motion: 0° 56^{m} 42.216^{s} / day
- Inclination: 3.7434°
- Longitude of ascending node: 18.850°
- Argument of perihelion: 80.5784°
- Earth MOID: 0.0016781 AU
- T_{Jupiter}: 5.941

Physical characteristics
- Mean diameter: 2 meters (6.6 ft)
- Synodic rotation period: 0.03715 h (2.229 min)
- Spectral type: E
- Absolute magnitude (H): 29.5

2015 TC_{25} is a near-Earth asteroid, and at only 1.8 meters (6 feet) across and absolute magnitude 29.34 mag, it is thought to be the third smallest asteroid observed over multiple years, after 2021 GM1 with absolute magnitude 30.4 and 2006 RH120 with absolute magnitude 29.5. The asteroid is notable for reflecting about 60% of the light that hits it, making it one of the brightest near-Earth asteroids ever seen.

Discovered by the Catalina Sky Survey on 12 October 2015, it was observed with several ground-based telescopes. Radar observations were also made using the Arecibo Observatory as it passed 128,000 kilometers (80,000 miles) from the Earth. Observations suggest its surface composition is similar to Aubrite meteorites, a rare class of high-albedo differentiated meteorites.

The albedo and radar polarization ratio suggest 2015 TC_{25} belongs to the E-type asteroids, and comparison of its spectral and dynamical properties suggest it may have broke off of the 70-kilometer diameter E-type asteroid 44 Nysa. 2015 TC_{25} is also notable for its rather short rotation period of only about 2 minutes, which, combined with its low surface gravity makes it very difficult for 2015 TC_{25} to retain a regolith layer. Its surface therefore most likely resembles a bare rock.
