= 4660 Nereus =

Near-Earth asteroid

- Nereus imaged by NASA's Goldstone Solar System Radar on its close approach in 2021

Discovery
- Discovered by: Eleanor F. Helin
- Discovery site: 1.22-m Samuel Oschin telescope
- Discovery date: 28 February 1982

Designations
- Pronunciation: /ˈnɪəriəs/ NEER-ee-əs
- Named after: Νηρεύς Nēreús
- Minor planet category: Apollo PHA

Orbital characteristics
- Epoch 2021-Jul-01 (JD 2459396.5)
- Uncertainty parameter 0
- Observation arc: 14647 days (40.10 yr)
- Aphelion: 2.0250 AU (303 million km)
- Perihelion: 0.95287 AU (143 million km)
- Semi-major axis: 1.4889 AU (223 million km)
- Eccentricity: 0.36004
- Orbital period (sidereal): 1.82 yr (663.62 d)
- Mean anomaly: 256.71°
- Mean motion: 0° 32^{m} 33.371^{s} / day
- Inclination: 1.4316°
- Longitude of ascending node: 314.41°
- Argument of perihelion: 158.12°
- Earth MOID: 0.0031 AU (460 thousand km)

Physical characteristics
- Dimensions: X = 510±20 m; Y = 330±20 m; Z = 241+80 −10 m
- Mean radius: 0.165 km
- Surface area: 0.33+0.04 −0.01 km^{2}
- Volume: 0.019±0.003 km^{3}
- Synodic rotation period: 15.1 h (0.63 d)
- Sidereal rotation period: 15.16
- Pole ecliptic longitude: +25°
- Pole ecliptic latitude: +80°
- Geometric albedo: 0.54+0.03 −0.09
- Spectral type: Xe
- Apparent magnitude: 12.6 (2021 peak); 9.8 (2060 peak)
- Absolute magnitude (H): 18.2±0.7

4660 Nereus (provisional designation 1982 DB) is an E-type near-earth asteroid approximatly 330 metres (1,080 ft) in diameter. It was discovered by Eleanor F. Helin on 28 February 1982, approximately a month after it passed 4.1 million km (11 LD) from Earth.

Nereus has a relatively bright absolute magnitude of +18.2 and a low minimum orbit intersection distance with Earth of about 460,000 kilometres (1.2 LD). Because of this, it is classified as a potentially hazardous object (PHO).

Because of its spectral type, it is thought to be potentially associated with aubrite meteorites (enstatite achondrites).

== Name ==
Although Helin was given the opportunity to name the asteroid, he donated naming rights to the Planetary Society which organized a naming contest.

The winner, Robert M. Cutler, then an employee of NASA contractor The MITRE Corporation, named the asteroid after the ancient Greek proto-god Nereus, who had characteristics later attributed to Apollo (prophecy) and Poseidon (a sea god similar to Nereus but with legs rather than a fish tail).

== Physical characteristics ==
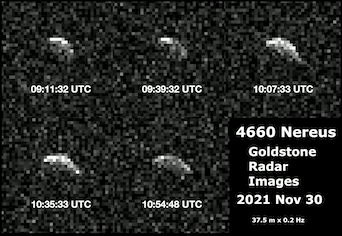
Collage of Nereus radar images from Goldstone in November 2021

Nereus has been imaged by radar, revealing a slightly elongated shape which would allow for stable orbits around it. Earlier optical measurements had given an estimated diameter of about 330±50 meters. More recent work on the analysis of the radar data gives a much more detailed shape for Nereus as well as a fairly detailed terrain map of the surface.

Nereus has a generally ellipsoidal shape with dimensions of 510 m × 330 m × 241 m. On the ends of its longest axis, one end appears narrower and rounder than the other, larger end, making it more of an egg shape. The larger end also appears to have a flatter region on one side of it. Nereus rotates about an axis roughly perpendicular to its longest axis much like a silver spoon spinning on a table.

== Close approaches ==
Nereus makes seven approaches to Earth of less than 5 million km between 1900 and 2100. The closest will be on 14 February 2060, at 1.2 million km. The most recent closest approach was on 11 December 2021, when it came within about 10 lunar distances of Earth. During the 2021 approach, the asteroid peaked around apparent magnitude 12.6, requiring a telescope with around a 100mm objective lens to be visually seen. Its orbital period of 663.6 days also puts it somewhat near a 2:1 orbital resonance with Earth, which means that an approximately 4-year mission could depart for and return from the asteroid on relatively near passes to the Earth.

Close approaches
Date	JPL SBDB nominal geocentric distance	uncertainty region (3-sigma)
2021-12-11	3934242 km	± 3 km
2060-02-14	1198007 km	± 234 km
2166-02-03	2800000 km	± 261 thousand km

== Exploration ==
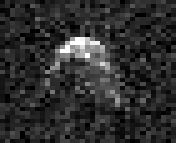
Nereus imaged by the Goldstone radar in 2002

Nereus is potentially an interesting object due to its high albedo of 0.54 (Note: While this value is not notably higher than the typical albido for E-type asteroids, but does lie near the high end of their typical range.). It is an Apollo and a Mars-crosser, with an orbit that frequently comes close to Earth. Because of this, it is exceptionally accessible to spacecraft: the delta-V required for rendezvous is about 5 km/s, which is smaller than that of the Moon (~6.3 km/s).

Nereus was proposed for visitation by both the private Near Earth Asteroid Prospector (NEAP) probe, and the Japanese sample return mission Hayabusa. However, the NEAP probe was not realized, and the Hayabusa's launch was delayed by 10 months and the probe had to be redirected to 25143 Itokawa.

4660 Nereus was considered as a flyby target of the NEAR robotic spacecraft mission. NEAR was eventually launched, but visited 253 Mathilde and 433 Eros.

== See also ==
- List of minor planets and comets visited by spacecraft
