= 3103 Eger =

Apollo asteroid

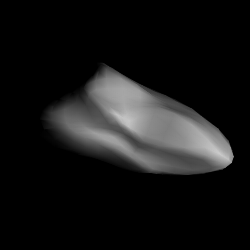
- Shape model of Eger from its lightcurve

Discovery
- Discovered by: M. Lovas
- Discovery site: Piszkéstető
- Discovery date: 20 January 1982

Designations
- Named after: Eger
- Alternative designations: 1982 BB
- Minor planet category: Apollo; Mars crosser

Orbital characteristics
- Epoch 13 January 2016 (JD 2457400.5)
- Uncertainty parameter 0
- Observation arc: 12495 days (34.21 yr)
- Aphelion: 1.9021 AU (284.55 Gm)
- Perihelion: 0.90673 AU (135.645 Gm)
- Semi-major axis: 1.4044 AU (210.10 Gm)
- Eccentricity: 0.35437
- Orbital period (sidereal): 1.66 yr (607.90 d)
- Mean anomaly: 208.62°
- Mean motion: 0° 35^{m} 31.92^{s} / day
- Inclination: 20.931°
- Longitude of ascending node: 129.792°
- Argument of perihelion: 254.007°
- Earth MOID: 0.0778981 AU (11.65339 Gm)

Proper orbital elements
- Proper eccentricity: 0.325
- Proper inclination: 22.364°
- Proper mean motion: 99.460 deg / yr
- Proper orbital period: 3.61955 yr (1322.039 d)

Physical characteristics
- Mean diameter: 1.5 km
- Synodic rotation period: 5.710156±0.000007 h
- Geometric albedo: 0.64
- Spectral type: E
- Absolute magnitude (H): 15.38

3103 Eger is an Apollo and Mars-crosser asteroid that was discovered in 1982, by Miklós Lovas. It was named after the city of Eger, Hungary. It has an albedo of 0.64, making it a highly reflective asteroid.

== Description ==
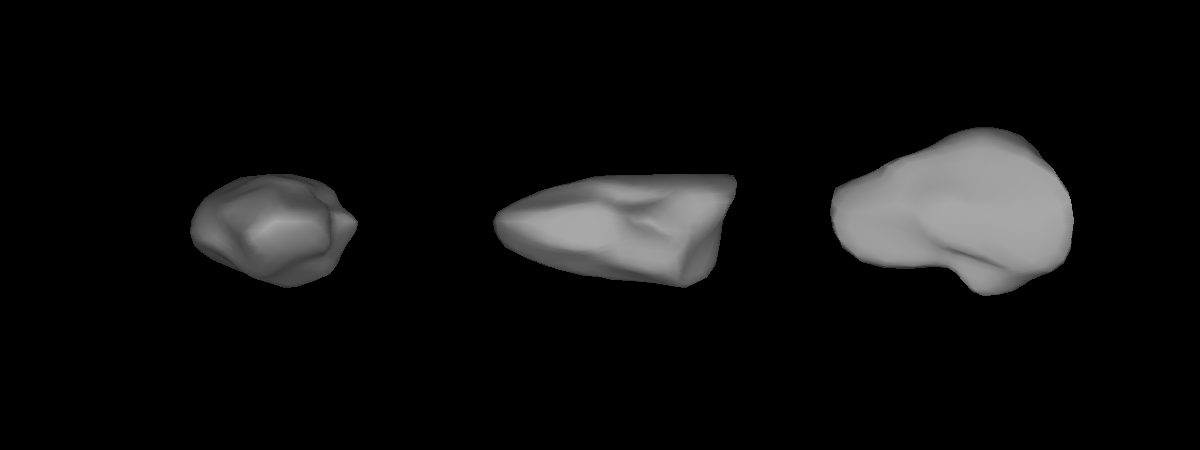
Lightcurve-based 3D-model of Eger

It has made and will continue to make many close approaches to Earth. Its closest approach occurred on 6 August 1996, when the asteroid passed 0.11509 AU (17.217 Gm) from Earth. The observed YORP value is (1.4±0.6)×10^{−8} rad d^{−2}.

3103 Eger is the only asteroid besides 4 Vesta identified as the parent body for specific meteorites. 4 Vesta is the parent body for Howardite, Eucrite, and Diogenite meteorites, while 3103 Eger is the parent body for Aubrite meteorites. In this characteristic 3103 Eger is related spectroscopically to the 434 Hungaria type asteroids, which are a Hirayama-family of orbital types, and E-type asteroids which form a spectroscopical type.

== See also ==
- Aubrite
- Hungaria family
- (144898) 2004 VD17
- 44 Nysa
- 2867 Šteins
