= Angelia (disambiguation) =

Angelia is a daughter of Hermes in Greek mythology.

Angelia may also refer to:

== People ==
- Sandra Angelia (born 1986), Miss Indonesia 2008
- Angelia Lawrance Morrison Harris (1912–1983), American philanthropist and civic leader
- Angelia Thurston Newman (1837–1910), American writer, editor, and lecturer
- Angelia Ong (born 1990), Miss Earth 2015

== Other uses ==
- "Angelia" (song), 1989 song by Richard Marx
- Angelos (mythology) or Angelia, a daughter of Zeus and Hera in Greek mythology
