= 1025 Riema =

Asteroid

Discovery
- Discovered by: K. Reinmuth
- Discovery site: Heidelberg Obs.
- Discovery date: 12 August 1923

Designations
- Named after: Johannes Riem (German astronomer)
- Alternative designations: 1923 NX · A923 QA
- Minor planet category: main-belt · (inner) · Hungaria

Orbital characteristics
- Epoch 4 September 2017 (JD 2458000.5)
- Uncertainty parameter 0
- Observation arc: 93.81 yr (34,264 days)
- Aphelion: 2.0572 AU
- Perihelion: 1.9009 AU
- Semi-major axis: 1.9790 AU
- Eccentricity: 0.0395
- Orbital period (sidereal): 2.78 yr (1,017 days)
- Mean anomaly: 102.31°
- Mean motion: 0° 21^{m} 14.4^{s} / day
- Inclination: 26.863°
- Longitude of ascending node: 163.39°
- Argument of perihelion: 349.06°

Physical characteristics
- Dimensions: 4.605±0.171 km 5.48 km (derived)
- Synodic rotation period: 3.566±0.005 h 3.578±0.002 h (Note: Warner (2017) web: rotation period 3.578±0.002 hours with a brightness amplitude of 0.06 mag. Summary figures for (1025) Riema at Collaborative Asteroid Lightcurve Link (CALL)) (Note: Lightcurve plots by B. D. Warner at the Palmer Divide Station in California: (2014), (2015) and (2017)); 3.580±0.005 h 3.581±0.002 h (Note: Lightcurve plot of 1025 Riema with a period of 3.581±0.002 hours, Palmer Divide Observatory, Colorado, B. D. Warner (2012)); 3.581±0.001 h 3.588±0.002 h 6.557±0.001 h
- Geometric albedo: 1.000±0.000; 0.166±0.036; 0.40 (assumed)
- Spectral type: E (Tholen), Xe (SMASS); M · Xe; B–V = 0.714; U–B = 0.294; V–R = 0.440±0.010
- Absolute magnitude (H): 12.30 · 12.5; 12.57±0.28 · 12.92±0.04

1025 Riema, provisional designation 1923 NX, is a bright Hungaria asteroid from the innermost regions of the asteroid belt, approximately 5 kilometers in diameter. It was discovered on 12 August 1923, by German astronomer Karl Reinmuth at the Heidelberg Observatory in southwest Germany. The asteroid was named after ARI astronomer Johannes Riem.

== Orbit and classification ==
Riema is a member of the Hungaria family, which form the innermost dense concentration of asteroids in the Solar System. It orbits the Sun at a distance of 1.9–2.1 AU once every 2 years and 9 months (1,017 days). Its orbit has an eccentricity of 0.04 and an inclination of 27° with respect to the ecliptic. The asteroid's observation arc begins at Heidelberg, four nights after its official discovery observation.

== Physical characteristics ==
In the Tholen classification, Riema is a bright E-type asteroid. In the SMASS taxonomy, it has been classified as a Xe-type, which transitions from the E to the X-types. In addition, the asteroid has also been polarimetrically characterized as a metallic M-type asteroid.

=== Lightcurves ===
In August 2001, a first rotational lightcurve of Riema was obtained from photometric observations by Ukrainian astronomers at Kharkiv (101) and Simeiz (094). Lightcurve analysis gave a rotation period of 6.557 hours with a brightness variation of 0.25 magnitude (U=2).

The Ukrainian team also determined the body's poles and axis-ratios. They found a spin axis of (141.0°, 11.0°) and (321.0.0°, −13.0°) in ecliptic coordinates (λ, β), as well as a semi-axis ratio of 3.41 (a/b) and 1.16 (b/c) for the three-axial ellipsoid model (Q=2).

Between 2003 and 2017, several additional lightcurves were obtained by American photometrists Robert Stephens and Brian Warner at the Santana Observatory (646), the Palmer Divide Observatory (716) and the Palmer Divide Station (U82), respectively. The constructed lightcurve gave a shorter period for Riema between 3.566 and 3.588 hours with a low amplitude of 0.06 to 0.19 magnitude (U=2/2/2+/2+/3/3).

=== Diameter and albedo ===
According to the survey carried out by the NEOWISE mission of NASA's Wide-field Infrared Survey Explorer, Riema measures 4.605 kilometers in diameter and its surface has an outstandingly high albedo of 1.000. The Collaborative Asteroid Lightcurve Link assumes an albedo for E-type Hungaria asteroids of 0.40 – taken from 434 Hungaria, the family's largest member and namesake – and derives a diameter of 5.48 kilometers based on an absolute magnitude of 12.92.

== Naming ==
This minor planet was named after Johannes Karl Richard Riem (1868–1945), a German astronomer at the Astronomisches Rechen-Institut (ARI) in Berlin. The name was suggested by ARI. The official naming citation was published by Paul Herget in The Names of the Minor Planets in 1955 (H 98).
