= 317 Roxane =

Main-belt asteroid

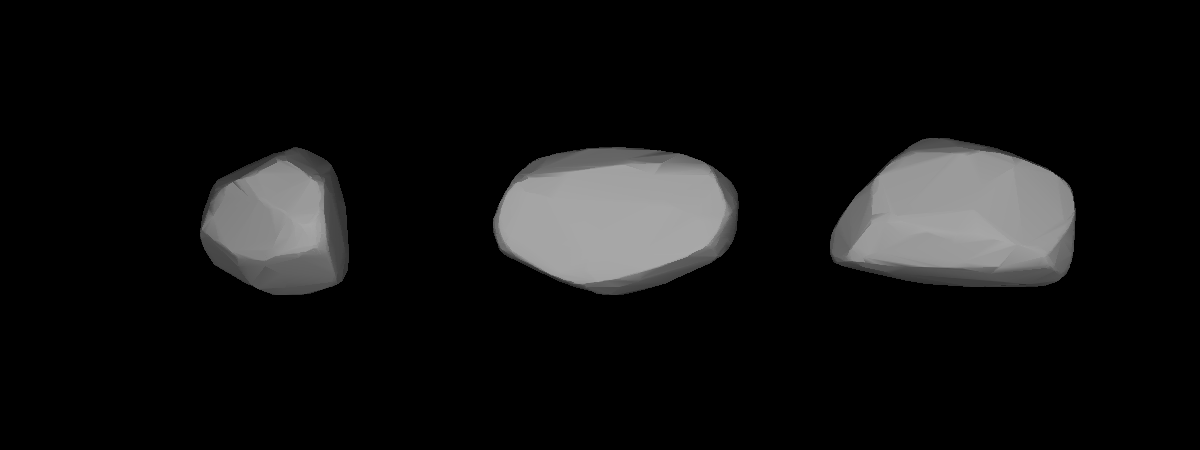
- Lightcurve-based 3D-model of 317 Roxane

Discovery
- Discovered by: Auguste Charlois
- Discovery date: 11 September 1891

Designations
- Pronunciation: French: [ʁɔksan]
- Named after: Roxana
- Alternative designations: A891 RD (Note: The MPC notates Roxane's retroactive new-style designation as 1891 RD.)
- Minor planet category: Main belt

Orbital characteristics
- Epoch 31 July 2016 (JD 2457600.5)
- Uncertainty parameter 0
- Observation arc: 124.03 yr (45302 d)
- Aphelion: 2.4832 AU (371.48 Gm)
- Perihelion: 2.0901 AU (312.67 Gm)
- Semi-major axis: 2.2866 AU (342.07 Gm)
- Eccentricity: 0.085956
- Orbital period (sidereal): 3.46 yr (1263.0 d)
- Mean anomaly: 39.3360°
- Mean motion: 0° 17^{m} 6.18^{s} / day
- Inclination: 1.7657°
- Longitude of ascending node: 151.38°
- Argument of perihelion: 186.926°

Physical characteristics
- Dimensions: 29.0 × 17.0 × 14.4 km (± 2.2 × 1.4 × 1.2 km)
- Mean diameter: 19.2 km (Note: Calculated as the diameter of a sphere with equivalent volume.)
- Volume: 3710±280 km^{3}
- Mass: (8.01±0.30)×10^{15} kg
- Mean density: 2.16±0.18 g/cm^{3}
- Synodic rotation period: 8.169 h (0.3404 d)
- Geometric albedo: 0.4928±0.083
- Spectral type: E
- Absolute magnitude (H): 10.03

317 Roxane is an asteroid from the asteroid belt approximately 19 km in diameter. It was discovered by French astronomer Auguste Charlois from Nice on 11 September 1891. The name was chosen by F. Bidschof, an assistant at the Vienna Observatory, at Charlois' request; Bidschof chose to name it after Roxana, the wife of Alexander the Great, and at first used the spelling "Roxana".

This asteroid is orbiting the Sun at a distance of 2.29 AU with a low eccentricity (ovalness) of 0.086 and an orbital period of 3.46 years. The orbital plane is inclined at an angle of 3.46° relative to the plane of the ecliptic. Infrared measurements show a diameter of 18.6 km. It is classified as an E-type asteroid and has a rotation period of 8.169 hours.

In 2008, a team identified Roxane as the closest known spectroscopic match for the Peña Blanca Spring meteorite that landed in a swimming pool in Texas in 1946. There is a possibility, therefore, that 317 Roxane is from the same parent object as this meteorite.

== Satellite ==
In 2009, a team using the Gemini North adaptive optics telescope discovered a moon orbiting Roxane. The moon is named Olympias, after the mother of Alexander the Great who was the king of Macedonia and husband of Roxana. Prior to its naming, the moon was provisionally designated S/2009 (317) 1. It measures 5 km in diameter and orbits 245 km from Roxane, completing one orbit every 13 days.

== See also ==
- Aubrite
- E-type asteroid
