= 1103 Sequoia =

Asteroid

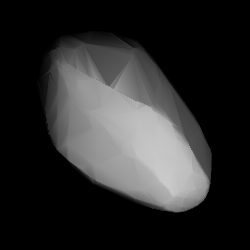
- Shape model of Sequoia from its lightcurve

Discovery
- Discovered by: W. Baade
- Discovery site: Bergedorf Obs.
- Discovery date: 9 November 1928

Designations
- Pronunciation: /sɪˈkwɔɪ.ə/
- Named after: Sequoia National Park (national park, California)
- Alternative designations: 1928 VB
- Minor planet category: main-belt · (inner Hungaria

Orbital characteristics
- Epoch 4 September 2017 (JD 2458000.5)
- Uncertainty parameter 0
- Observation arc: 88.91 yr (32,473 days)
- Aphelion: 2.1169 AU
- Perihelion: 1.7505 AU
- Semi-major axis: 1.9337 AU
- Eccentricity: 0.0948
- Orbital period (sidereal): 2.69 yr (982 days)
- Mean anomaly: 66.943°
- Mean motion: 0° 21^{m} 59.4^{s} / day
- Inclination: 17.899°
- Longitude of ascending node: 267.65°
- Argument of perihelion: 77.910°

Physical characteristics
- Dimensions: 5.21±0.42 km 6.692±0.078 km 7.623±0.058 km 7.816 km 7.82 km (taken)
- Synodic rotation period: 3.0335±0.0003 h 3.037±0.002 h 3.03784±0.00001 h 3.03797 h (Note: Durech (2006).(1103) Sequoia: sidereal rotation period of 3.037975 hours (Quality code of 2). Two spin axes at (82.0, -75.0) and (209.0, -76.0) in ecliptic coordinates. Summary figures at the LCDB); 3.037976±0.00005 h 3.037977±0.000005 h 3.0381±0.0002 h 3.04±0.01 h 3.044±0.005 h (Note: Lightcurve plot of 1103 Sequoia, Palmer Divide Observatory, B. D. Warner (2011). Summary figures at the LCDB); 3.049±0.001 h 3.049±0.002 h
- Geometric albedo: 0.2813; 0.3044±0.0439; 0.384±0.059; 0.823±0.138
- Spectral type: Tholen = E · E SMASS = Xk · B–V = 0.731; U–B = 0.242
- Absolute magnitude (H): 12.25 · 12.53 · 12.53±0.08

1103 Sequoia (/səˈkwɔɪ.ə/; prov. designation: 1928 VB) is a bright Hungaria asteroid from the innermost region of the asteroid belt, approximately 7 kilometers (4.3 miles) in diameter. It was discovered on 9 November 1928, by German astronomer Walter Baade at the Bergedorf Observatory in Hamburg, Germany, who named it after the Sequoia National Park located in California.

== Orbit and classification ==
Sequoia is a bright member of the Hungaria family (003), a large family within the larger dynamical Hungaria group that forms the innermost dense concentration of asteroids in the Solar System. It orbits the Sun at a distance of 1.8–2.1 AU once every 2 years and 8 months (982 days; semi-major axis of 1.93 AU). Its orbit has an eccentricity of 0.09 and an inclination of 18° with respect to the ecliptic.

The body's observation arc begins at the North African Algiers Observatory in December 1928, about 7 weeks after its official discovery observation at Bergedorf.

== Physical characteristics ==
In the Tholen classification and based on observations by the Wide-field Infrared Survey Explorer (WISE), Sequoia is a bright E-type asteroid, which is the predominant type for members of the Hungaria family, while in the SMASS classification, it is a Xk-subtype that transitions between the X- and K-type asteroids.

=== Rotation period ===
A large number of rotational lightcurves of Sequoia have been obtained from photometric observations since 1990. Best rated lightcurve by Italian amateur astronomer Silvano Casulli from December 2006 gave a rotation period of 3.03784 hours with a brightness amplitude of 0.44 magnitude (U=3).

=== Poles ===
Sequoia's lightcurve has also been modeled several times and gave a concurring sidereal period of 3.03797, 3.037976 and 3.037977 hours. In 2016, the large collaboration of astronomers also published a spin axis of (60.0°, −59.0°) in ecliptic coordinates (λ, β).

=== Diameter and albedo ===
According to the surveys carried out by the Japanese Akari satellite and the NEOWISE mission of NASA's WISE telescope, Sequoia measures between 5.21 and 7.816 kilometers in diameter and its surface has an albedo between 0.2813 and 0.823.

The Collaborative Asteroid Lightcurve Link adopts Petr Pravec's revised WISE results, that is, an albedo of 0.2813 and a diameter of 7.82 kilometers based on an absolute magnitude of 12.53.

== Naming ==
This minor planet was named after the Sequoia National Park located in California, United States, where the discoverer spent his vacations. The park is famous for its giant sequoia trees. The official naming citation was mentioned in The Names of the Minor Planets by Paul Herget in 1955 (H n.a.).
