= 64 Angelina =

Main-belt asteroid

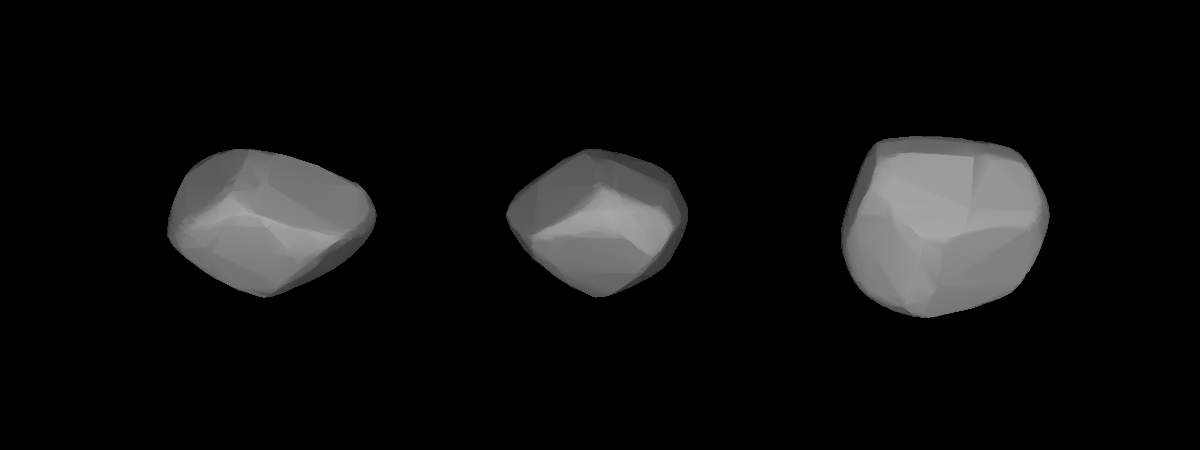
- Lightcurve-based 3D model of Angelina

Discovery
- Discovered by: Ernst Wilhelm Tempel
- Discovery date: 4 March 1861

Designations
- Pronunciation: /ˌændʒəˈliːnə/ AN-jə-LEE-nə
- Minor planet category: Main belt
- Adjectives: Angelinian (/ˌændʒəˈlɪniən/ AN-jə-LIN-nee-ən)

Orbital characteristics
- Epoch 31 December 2006 (JD 2,454,100.5)
- Aphelion: 451.375 million km (3.017 AU)
- Perihelion: 351.784 million km (2.352 AU)
- Semi-major axis: 401.580 million km (2.684 AU)
- Eccentricity: 0.124
- Orbital period (sidereal): 1,606.452 d (4.40 yr)
- Mean anomaly: 107.758°
- Inclination: 1.308°
- Longitude of ascending node: 309.285°
- Argument of perihelion: 179.641°

Physical characteristics
- Dimensions: 48 × 53 km 60 × 53 × 45 km
- Mean diameter: 48.9+3.8 −2.3 km/50.7+2.1 −3.0 km (LCI + occ); 54±2 km (thermophysical)
- Synodic rotation period: 8.751708±0.000003 h
- Axial tilt: ~90°
- Pole ecliptic longitude: 135°+4° −1° 313°+3° −1° (alternate pole solution)
- Pole ecliptic latitude: 12°+12° −14° 13°+8° −11° (alternate pole solution)
- Geometric albedo: 0.28; 0.483 (NEOWISE)
- Spectral type: E
- Absolute magnitude (H): 7.72

64 Angelina is an asteroid in the central region of the asteroid belt, approximately 50 kilometres in diameter. It is the second-largest known E-type asteroid, a rare type of asteroid with a highly reflective surface rich in enstatite.

== Discovery and naming ==
Angelina was discovered on 4 March 1861, by a prolific comet discoverer, E. W. Tempel, observing from Marseille, France. It was the first of his five asteroid discoveries.

The naming of Angelina caused some controversy. It was chosen by Benjamin Valz, director of the Marseille Observatory, in honour of the astronomical station of that name operated by Baron Franz Xaver von Zach on the mountains above the city. At the time, asteroids were supposed to receive names from classical mythology, and several astronomers protested against the choice. Tempel noted that if the second 'n' were removed, the complaints would be satisfied (referring to Angelia, a minor Greek deity). However, Valz's choice stayed.

== Physical characteristics ==
Angelina is a E-type asteroid, a rare type of asteroid with a reflective surface rich in enstatite. It has a diameter of approximately 50 km (31 mi), making it the second-largest known E-type asteroid after 44 Nysa. Angelina has an exceptionally high albedo of 0.483.

Back when asteroids were generally assumed to have low albedos, Angelina was thought to be the largest of this class, but modern research has shown that its diameter is only a quarter of what was previously assumed, an error caused by its exceptional brightness. Traditional calculations had suggested that since Angelina has an absolute magnitude of 7.7 and an albedo of 0.15, its diameter would have been around 100 km. However, a 2004 occultation showed a cross-sectional profile of only 48 × 53 km. Angelina was observed by Arecibo radar in January 2010.
