= Aubrite =

Group of meteorites

- — Group —
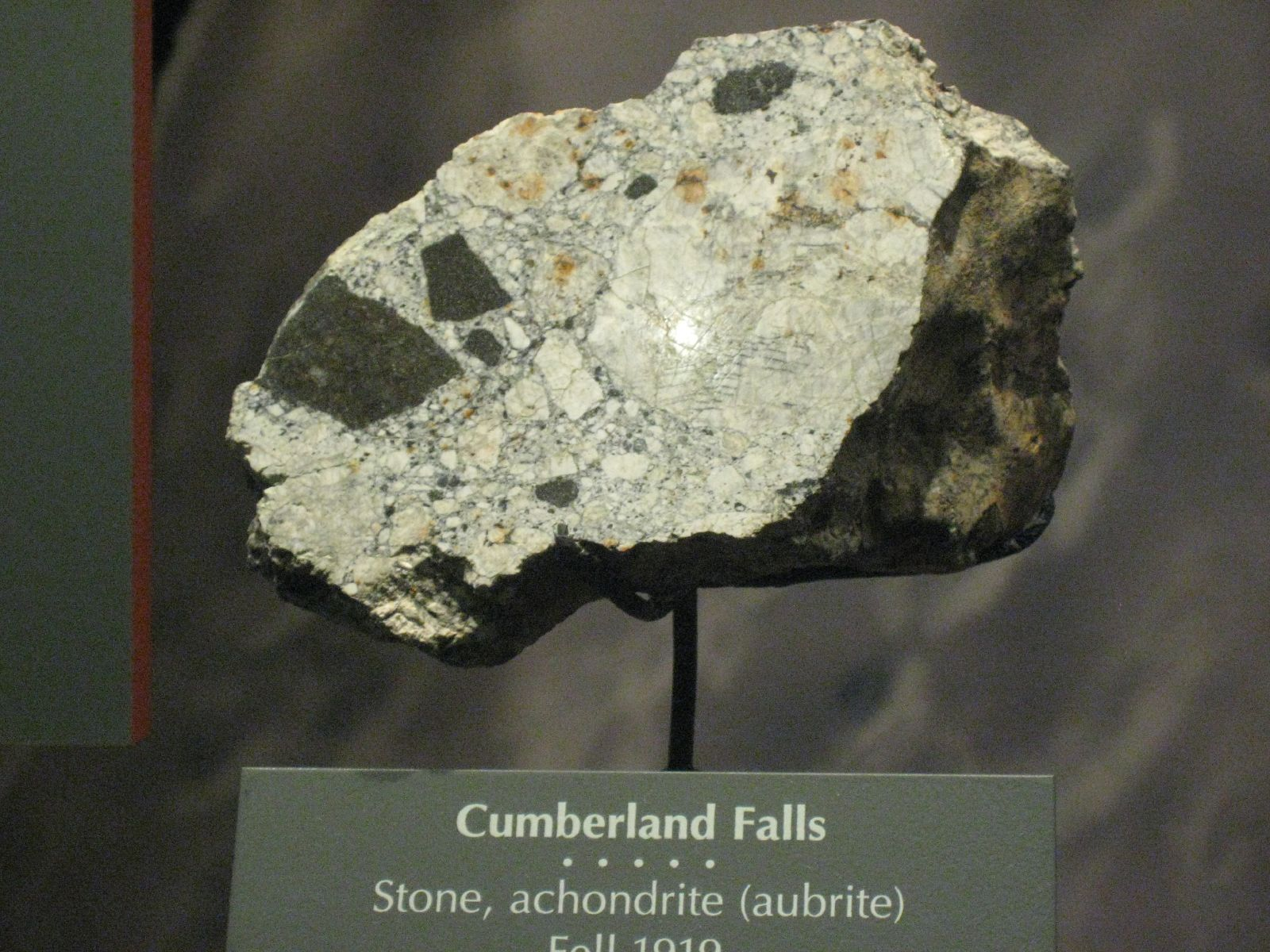
- Cumberland Falls, an aubrite
- Type: Achondrite
- Class: Asteroidal achondrite or enstatite achondrite
- Parent body: Possibly (3103) Eger
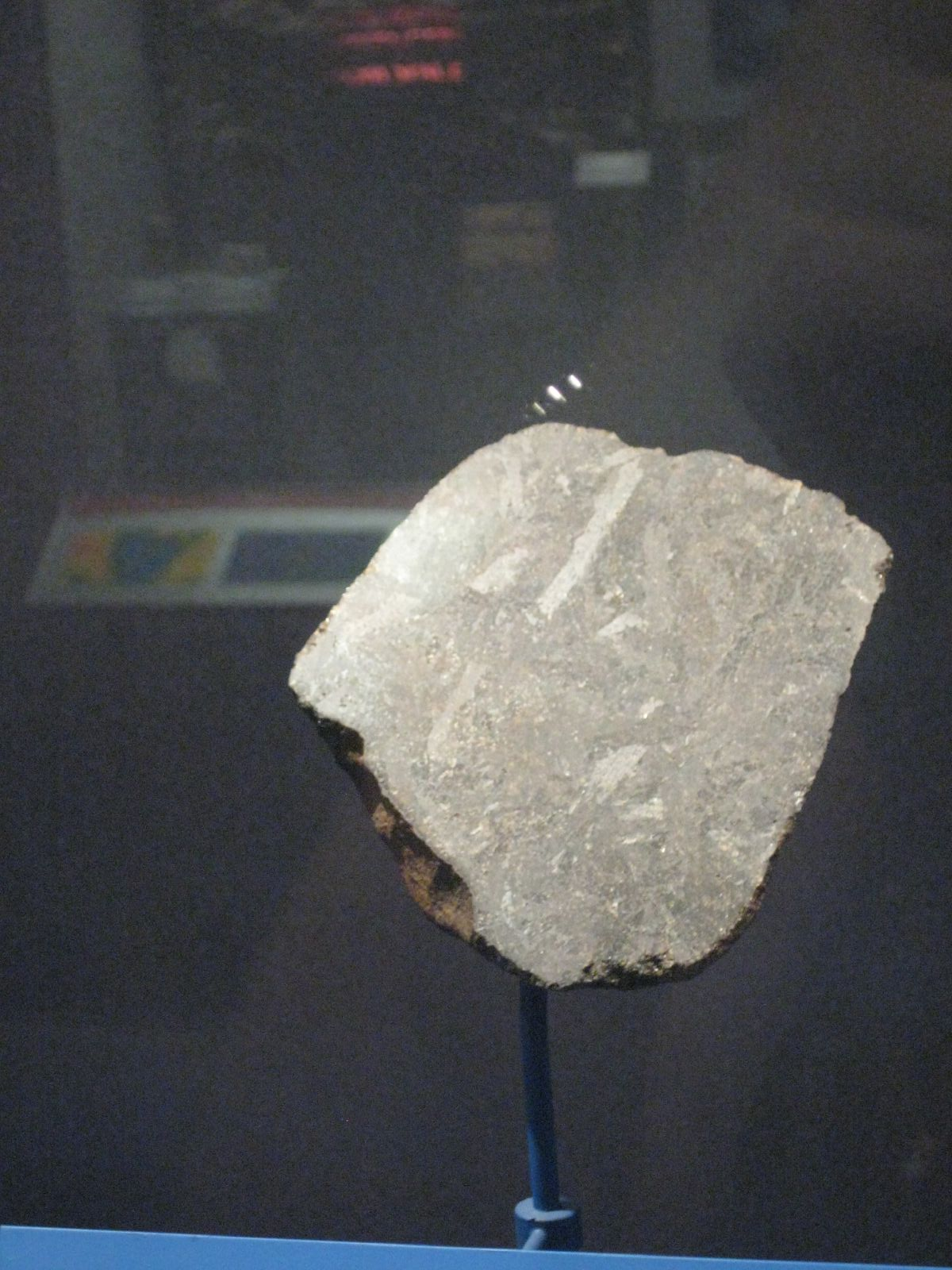
- Shallowater meteorite, an aubrite

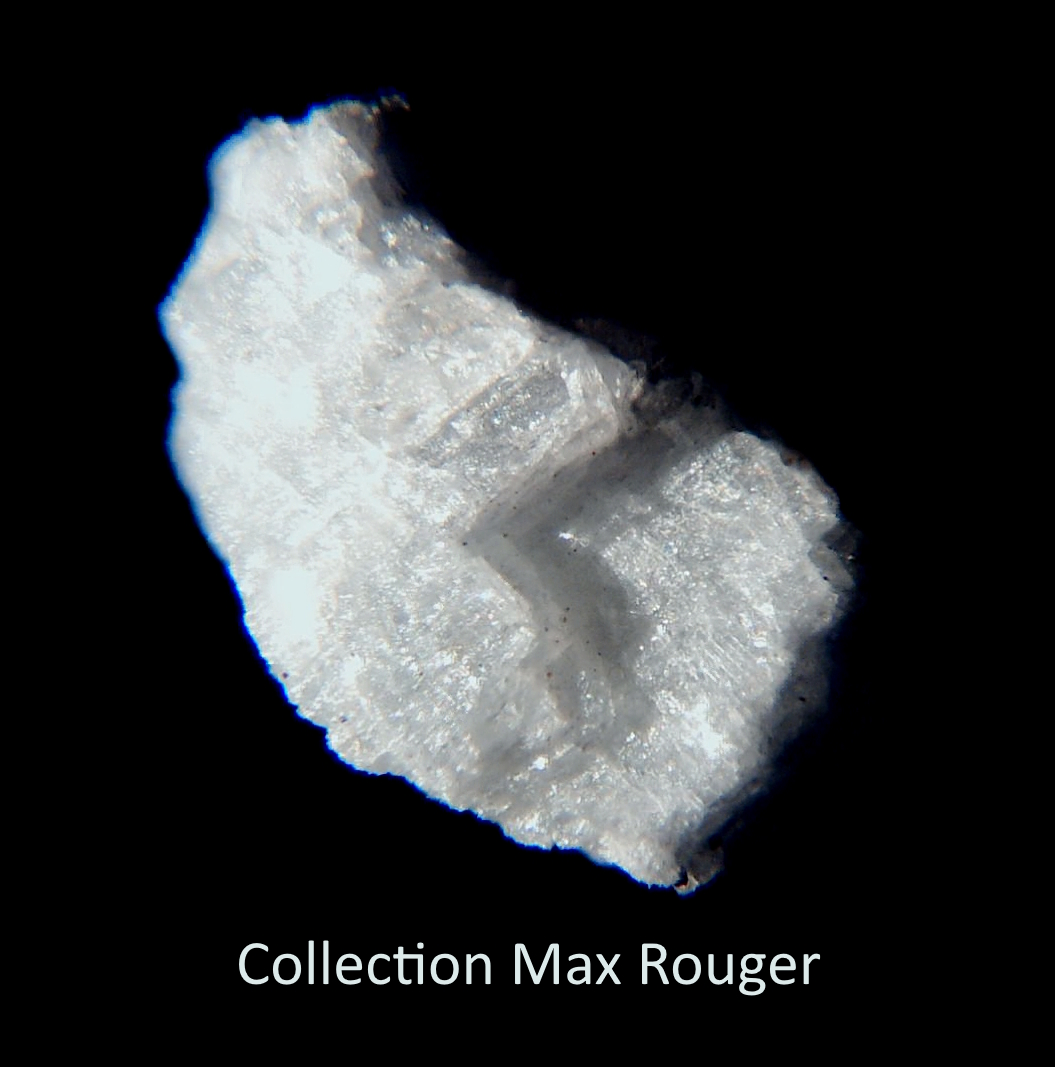
Fragment of the Aubres meteorite observed under a microscope at 40x magnification

Aubrites are a group of meteorites named for Aubres, a small achondrite meteorite that fell in 1836 in Aubres near Nyons, France. They are primarily composed of the orthopyroxene enstatite and are often called enstatite achondrites. Their igneous origin separates them from primitive enstatite achondrites and means they originated in an asteroid.

Aubrites are typically light-colored with a brownish fusion crust. Most aubrites are heavily brecciated; they are often said to look "lunar" in origin.

Aubrites are primarily composed of large white crystals of the Fe-poor, Mg-rich orthopyroxene, or enstatite, with minor phases of olivine, nickel-iron metal, and troilite, indicating a magmatic formation under extremely reducing conditions. The severe brecciation of most aubrites attests to a violent history for their parent body. Since some aubrites contain chondritic xenoliths, it is likely that the aubrite parent body collided with an asteroid of "F-chondritic" composition.

Comparisons of aubrite spectra to the spectra of asteroids have revealed striking similarities between the aubrite group and the E-type asteroids of the Nysa family. A small near-Earth object, 3103 Eger, is also often suggested as the parent body of the aubrites.

It has been suggested that aubrites may originate from the planet Mercury.

The aubrite 2024 BX_{1} might on the other hand originate from the Hungaria family. Its spectrum shows similarities to (434) Hungaria. The composition is however different when compared to (44) Nysa and (64) Angelina, ruling out a linkage. Its orbit orientation does not agree with 3103 Eger, which rules out Eger as a direct origin. The spectrum is also not meaningfully similar when compared to Mercury.

== See also ==
- Glossary of meteoritics
- 3103 Eger
- 44 Nysa
