= 7187 Isobe =

Hungaria asteroid

Discovery
- Discovered by: E. F. Helin
- Discovery site: Palomar Obs.
- Discovery date: 30 January 1992

Designations
- Named after: Syuzo Isobe (Japanese astronomer)
- Alternative designations: 1992 BW · 1985 QC_{3}
- Minor planet category: main-belt · (inner); Hungaria

Orbital characteristics
- Epoch 4 September 2017 (JD 2458000.5)
- Uncertainty parameter 0
- Observation arc: 30.61 yr (11,182 days)
- Aphelion: 2.1048 AU
- Perihelion: 1.7700 AU
- Semi-major axis: 1.9374 AU
- Eccentricity: 0.0864
- Orbital period (sidereal): 2.70 yr (985 days)
- Mean anomaly: 251.94°
- Mean motion: 0° 21^{m} 55.8^{s} / day
- Inclination: 21.784°
- Longitude of ascending node: 315.32°
- Argument of perihelion: 86.408°
- Known satellites: 1 (likely)

Physical characteristics
- Dimensions: 3.85 km (calculated); 4.85±1.43 km 5.421±1.086 km 6.05±1.46 km
- Synodic rotation period: 2.440±0.002 h 2.58±0.01 h 4.241±0.006 h 4.2427±0.002 h 4.2432±0.0005 h
- Geometric albedo: 0.093±0.027; 0.12±0.09; 0.134±0.104; 0.167±0.094; 0.3 (assumed)
- Spectral type: E
- Absolute magnitude (H): 13.89 · 13.90 · 14.0 · 14.50

7187 Isobe, provisional designation 1992 BW, is a likely binary Hungaria asteroid from the inner regions of the asteroid belt, approximately 5 kilometers in diameter. It was discovered on 30 January 1992, by American astronomer Eleanor Helin at Palomar Observatory in California, United States. It is named after Japanese astronomer Syuzo Isobe.

== Classification and orbit ==
The presumed E-type asteroid is a member of the Hungaria family, which form the innermost dense concentration of asteroids in the Solar System. Isobe orbits the Sun in the inner main-belt at a distance of 1.8–2.1 AU once every 2 years and 8 months (985 days). Its orbit has an eccentricity of 0.09 and an inclination of 22° with respect to the ecliptic. It was first identified as 1985 QC_{3} at the discovery observatory in 1985, extending the body's observation arc by 7 years prior to its official discovery observation.

According to the survey carried out by NASA's Wide-field Infrared Survey Explorer with its subsequent NEOWISE mission, Isobe measures between 4.85 and 6.05 kilometers in diameter, and its surface has an albedo between 0.12 and 0.167. The Collaborative Asteroid Lightcurve Link assumes an albedo of 0.30 – a compromise value between 0.4 and 0.2, corresponding to the Hungaria asteroids both as family and orbital group – and calculates a diameter of 3.85 kilometers with an absolute magnitude of 14.0.

== Moon and lightcurve ==
Since August 2004, American astronomer Brian Warner obtained several rotational lightcurves of Isobe at his Palmer Divide Observatory in Colorado. Light curve and follow-up analysis gave a well-defined rotation period of 4.2432 hours with a brightness amplitude of 0.22 magnitude (U=3), after initial photometric observations indicated a shorter period solution of 2.4 hours.

In 2012, observations by Brian Warner also indicated that Isobe is very likely a synchronous binary asteroid, orbited by a minor-planet moon every 33 hours. The size of this satellite remains unknown and no secondary-to-primary diameter ratio has been published. Isobe's binary nature still needs further observations.

Isobe was also observed by American astronomer Robert Stephens at the Center for Solar System Studies in September 2015, giving a period of 4.241 hours with an amplitude of 0.22 magnitude. However, no mutual occultation events have been found during the two-night long observation period (U=3-).

== Naming ==
The asteroid has been named after Syuzo Isobe (born 1942), a Japanese scientist at NAOJ, individual member of the IAU, and president of the Japan Spaceguard Association. He significantly contributed in establishing the Bisei Spaceguard Center, an observatory designed for the observation of NEOs and earth-orbiting space debris. The approved naming citation was published by the Minor Planet Center on 1 November 2001 (M.P.C. 43762).
