= 1453 Fennia =

Hungaria asteroid and synchronous binary system

Discovery
- Discovered by: Y. Väisälä
- Discovery site: Turku Obs.
- Discovery date: 8 March 1938

Designations
- Pronunciation: /ˈfɛniə/
- Named after: Finland (Scandinavian country)
- Alternative designations: 1938 ED_{1}
- Minor planet category: main-belt · (inner); Hungaria · background

Orbital characteristics
- Epoch 4 September 2017 (JD 2458000.5)
- Uncertainty parameter 0
- Observation arc: 79.50 yr (29,037 days)
- Aphelion: 1.9502 AU
- Perihelion: 1.8438 AU
- Semi-major axis: 1.8970 AU
- Eccentricity: 0.0281
- Orbital period (sidereal): 2.61 yr (954 days)
- Mean anomaly: 72.856°
- Mean motion: 0° 22^{m} 37.92^{s} / day
- Inclination: 23.675°
- Longitude of ascending node: 7.0898°
- Argument of perihelion: 254.79°
- Known satellites: 1 (D: 1.95 km; P: 23.55 h)

Physical characteristics
- Dimensions: 6.36±0.68 km 6.573±0.245 km 6.96±0.39 km (derived); 7.23±0.4 km 7.32 km 8.98±0.28 km
- Synodic rotation period: 4.412±0.002 h (Note: Lightcurve plot of 1453 Fennia, Palmer Divide Station, California, Brian D. Warner (2016). rotation period 4.412±0.002 hours with a brightness amplitude of 0.19 mag, and P2-chart with an orbital period of 23.55±0.05 hours. Summary figures at LCDB); 4.4121±0.0001 h (Note: Lightcurve plot of 1453 Fennia, Palmer Divide Observatory, Colorado, Brian D. Warner (2007) rotation period 4.4121±0.0001 hours with a brightness amplitude of 0.10±0.01 mag, including primary–secondary mutual eclipsing/occultation event chart with an orbital period of 22.99±0.05. Summary figures at LCDB); 4.41224±0.0004 h 4.4124±0.0004 h 4.413±0.002 h 6±1 h 12.23±0.04 h (wrong)
- Geometric albedo: 0.140±0.029; 0.186±0.013; 0.244±0.031; 0.2494±0.032; 0.409±0.040; 0.50±0.16
- Spectral type: Tholen = S · K B–V = 0.928; B–V = 0.890±0.030; U–B = 0.532; V–R = 0.500±0.020; V–I = 0.980±0.020
- Absolute magnitude (H): 12.38±0.05 (R) · 12.50 · 12.69 · 12.81±0.06 · 12.82±0.24 · 12.83 · 12.83±0.07 · 12.835 · 12.835±0.06

1453 Fennia, provisional designation 1938 ED_{1}, is a stony Hungaria asteroid and synchronous binary system from the innermost regions of the asteroid belt, approximately 7 kilometers in diameter. Discovered by Yrjö Väisälä at the Turku Observatory in 1938, the asteroid was later named after the Nordic country of Finland. The system's minor-planet moon was discovered in 2007. It has a derived diameter of 1.95 kilometers and is orbiting its primary every 23.55 hours.

== Discovery ==
Fennia was discovered on 8 March 1938, by Finnish astronomer Yrjö Väisälä at the Iso-Heikkilä Observatory in Turku, southwest Finland. Fifteen days later, it was independently discovered by Soviet astronomer Grigory Neujmin at the Simeiz Observatory on the Crimean peninsula, which also served as a confirmation of the first observation. The Minor Planet Center only recognizes the first discoverer.

== Orbit and classification ==
Fennia is a bright member of the Hungaria asteroids, a dynamical group that forms the innermost dense concentration of asteroids in the Solar System. The group includes all members of large asteroid family of the same name (003). When applying the Hierarchical Clustering Method to its proper orbital elements, Fennia is a non-family asteroid of the main belt's background population.

It orbits the Sun in the inner main-belt at a distance of 1.8–2.0 AU once every 2 years and 7 months (954 days). Its orbit has an eccentricity of 0.03 and an inclination of 24° with respect to the ecliptic. The body's observation arc begins at the discovering observatory (or at Simeiz Observatory), 15 days after its official discovery observation at Turku.

== Physical characteristics ==
In the Tholen classification, Fennia is a common, stony S-type asteroid. It has also been characterized as a rare K-type asteroid.

=== Rotation period ===
Since 1991, a large number of rotational lightcurves of Fennia have been obtained from photometric observations. Lightcurve analysis gave a consolidated rotation period of 4.4121 hours with a brightness amplitude between 0.10 and 0.20 magnitude (U=0/3/3/3/3/3-). Due to its relatively low brightness amplitude, Fennia is likely spheroidal in shape.

=== Moon ===
In 2007, these photometric lightcurve observations revealed that Fennia is a synchronous binary asteroid, orbited by a minor-planet moon. The moon has an orbital period of 22.99 hours, later revised to 23.55 hours. It is at least a quarter the size of Fennia itself – a secondary-to-primary mean-diameter ratio of 0.28±0.02) – which translates into a diameter of 1.95±0.18 kilometers based on current estimates.

=== Diameter and albedo ===
According to the surveys carried out by the Infrared Astronomical Satellite IRAS, the Japanese Akari satellite and the NEOWISE mission of NASA's Wide-field Infrared Survey Explorer, Fennia measures between 6.36 and 8.98 kilometers in diameter and its surface has an albedo between 0.140 and 0.50.

The Johnston's archive derives a diameter of 6.96 kilometers, while Collaborative Asteroid Lightcurve Link adopts an albedo of 0.244 and a diameter of 7.32 kilometers using an absolute magnitude of 12.835, taken from the revised WISE-results.

== Naming ==
This minor planet was named in honor of the Nordic country of Finland. "Fennia" is the Latin word for Finland. The official naming citation was mentioned in The Names of the Minor Planets by Paul Herget in 1955 (H 130).
