= Fernando Pedichini =

Italian astronomer

Minor planets discovered: 1
(21291) 1996 VG_{6}	12 November 1996	^{A}
^{A} co-discovery with A. Boattini

Fernando Pedichini is an Italian astronomer at the National Institute for Astrophysics (INAF) and discoverer of an asteroid.

In 1996, he co-discovered the main-belt asteroid (21291) 1996 VG_{6} together with Italian astronomer Andrea Boattini at the Campo Imperatore Observatory (599), where later the very successful Campo Imperatore Near-Earth Object Survey (CINEOS) took place.
