= Aubres =

- Commune
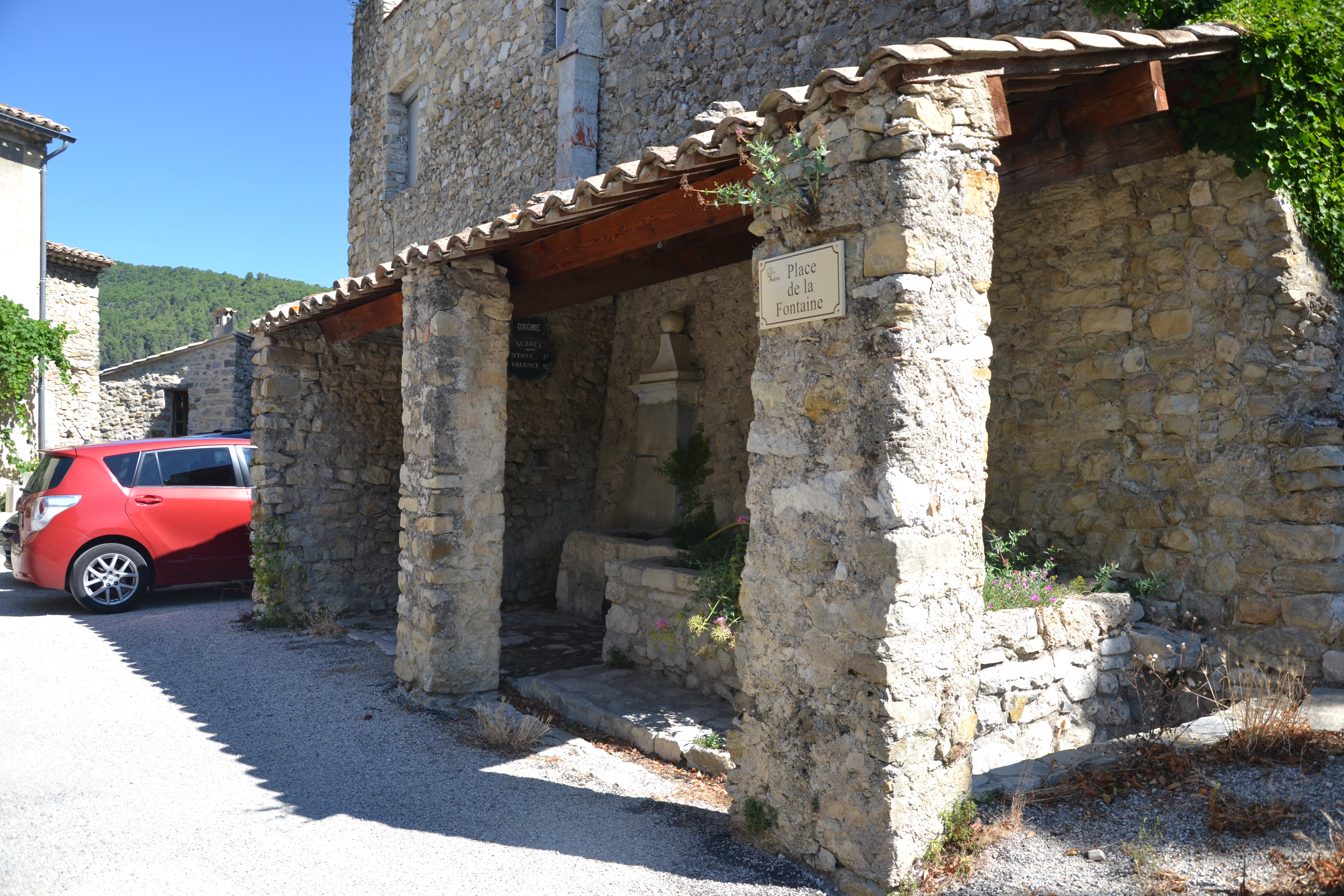
- The old lavoir in Aubres
- Location of Aubres
- Location within France Location within Auvergne-Rhône-Alpes
- Coordinates: 44°22′39″N 5°10′07″E
- Country: France
- Region: Auvergne-Rhône-Alpes
- Department: Drôme
- Arrondissement: Nyons
- Canton: Nyons et Baronnies
- Intercommunality: CC Baronnies Drôme Provençale

Government
  - Mayor (2020–2026): Éric Richard
- Area^{1}: 20.27 km^{2} (7.83 sq mi)
- Highest elevation: 1,217 m (3,993 ft)
- Lowest elevation: 270 m (890 ft)
- Population (2023): 420
  - Density: 21/km^{2} (54/sq mi)
- Time zone: UTC+01:00 (CET)
  - Summer (DST): UTC+02:00 (CEST)
- INSEE/Postal code: 26016 /26110
- ^{1} French Land Register data, which excludes lakes, ponds, glaciers > 1 km^{2} (0.386 sq mi or 247 acres) and river estuaries.

Aubres (French pronunciation: [obʁ]; Occitan: Albs) is a commune in the Drôme department in southeastern France.

== Population ==
Historical population
Year	Pop.	±% p.a.
1968	162	—
1975	207	+3.56%
1982	249	+2.67%
1990	283	+1.61%
1999	349	+2.36%
2007	423	+2.43%
2012	414	−0.43%
2017	421	+0.34%
2023	420	−0.04%
Source: INSEE

== See also ==
- Communes of the Drôme department
