= Angelia =

Daughter of Hermes

In a poem by the Greek poet Pindar (5th-century BC), Angelia (Ancient Greek: Ἀγγελία ('Message') is mentioned as a daughter of the Greek messenger-god Hermes, where she is understood as "message" personified.
