= Hungaria family =

Asteroid family

The Hungaria family (003) is a collisional asteroid family of at least 2,966 known asteroids, named for its largest member, the 11-kilometre (6.8 mi)-across asteroid 434 Hungaria. It lies within the larger dynamical group of Hungaria asteroids, a group of asteroids in the far inner asteroid belt, with semimajor axes of 1.78 to 2.00 AU. All members of the family are bright E-type asteroids with albedos of around 0.35–0.6.

An asteroid family is a group of physically related asteroids usually created by a collision with an original larger asteroid, with the fragments continuing on similar orbits to the original. This is distinct from a dynamical group in that the members of a dynamical group only share similar orbits because of gravitational interactions with planets, which concentrate asteroids in a particular orbital range. Members of the Hungaria family are both part of the wider Hungaria dynamical group, and fragments of 434 Hungaria. The family is considered a catastrophic asteroid family because 434 Hungaria, its largest member, makes up only a fifth of the family's mass.

The family has been variously estimated to be 205±45 million years, 275 million years, and 400±100 million years old.

== Large members ==

- 434 Hungaria: 0.0147 (18.8%)
- 1103 Sequoia: 0.00384 (4.9%)
- 3169 Ostro: 0.00157 (2.0%)
- 4031 Mueller: 0.000889 (1.1%)
- 3086 Kalbaugh: 0.000693 (0.9%)
- 1919 Clemence: 0.000579 (0.7%)
- 5390 Huichiming: 0.000519 (0.7%)
- 5427 Jensmartin: 0.000464 (0.6%)
- 4232 Aparicio: 0.000439 (0.6%)
- 5378 Ellyett: 0.000421 (0.5%)
- all other members: 0.0541 (69.2%)
Mass distribution of the Hungaria family (assuming similar densities)

The 10 brightest Hungaria family members
Name	Abs. Mag	Size (km)	proper a (AU)	proper e	proper i
434 Hungaria	11.24	11	1.9443	0.078	20.868
1103 Sequoia	12.21	6.7	1.9336	0.083	20.847
3169 Ostro	12.86	4.7	1.8918	0.070	22.357
4031 Mueller	13.27	3.9	1.9342	0.071	20.624
3086 Kalbaugh	13.45	4.0	1.9358	0.048	21.800
1919 Clemence	13.58	3.3	1.9360	0.075	20.980
5390 Huichiming	13.66	3.4	1.9391	0.059	21.111
5427 Jensmartin	13.74	3.2	1.9317	0.085	21.162
4232 Aparicio	13.78	3.3	1.9362	0.063	20.608
5378 Ellyett	13.81	3.0	1.9342	0.073	21.213
