= Enstatite =

Pyroxene: magnesium-iron silicate with MgSiO_{3} and FeSiO_{3} end-members

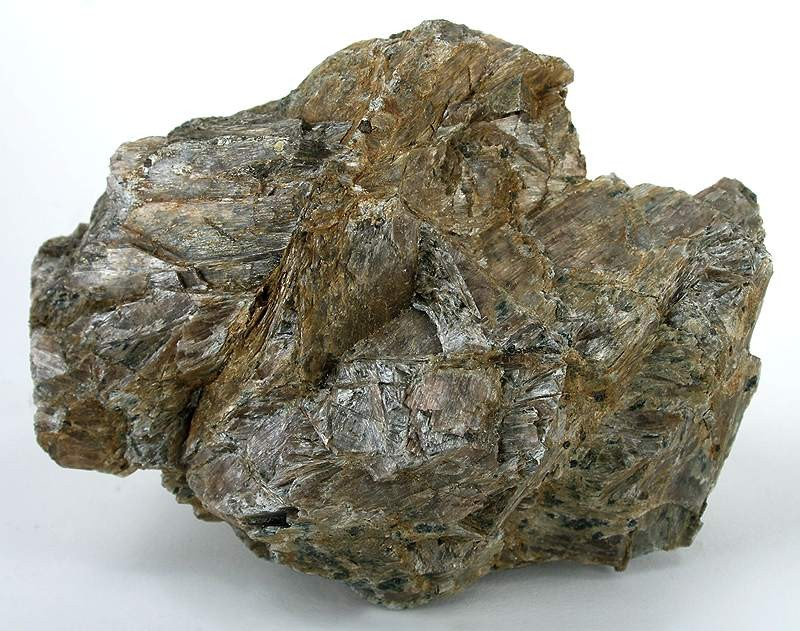

General
- Category: Inosilicate minerals (single chain)
- Group: Pyroxene group, orthopyroxene subgroup
- Formula: MgSiO_{3}
- IMA symbol: En
- Strunz classification: 9.DA.05
- Crystal system: Orthorhombic
- Crystal class: Dipyramidal (mmm); H-M symbol: (2/m 2/m 2/m)
- Space group: Pbca
- Unit cell: a = 18.23, b = 8.84 c = 5.19 [Å]; Z = 8

Identification
- Formula mass: 100.387 g·mol^{−1}
- Color: White, grey, green, yellow or brown - colorless in thin section.
- Crystal habit: Prismatic crystals, commonly lamellar, fibrous, or massive
- Twinning: Simple and lamellar on [100]
- Cleavage: Good/distinct on [210]
- Fracture: Uneven
- Tenacity: Brittle
- Mohs scale hardness: 5 to 6
- Luster: Vitreous, pearly on cleavage
- Streak: Gray
- Diaphaneity: Translucent to opaque
- Specific gravity: 3.2–3.3
- Optical properties: Biaxial (+)
- Refractive index: n_{α} = 1.650–1.668; n_{β} = 1.652–1.673; n_{γ} = 1.659–1.679
- Birefringence: δ = 0.009–0.011
- Pleochroism: Pink to green pleochroism diagnostic for enstatite, pale green to pale orange perpendicular to pink-green axis
- 2V angle: 55–90°

Enstatite is a mineral; the magnesium endmember of the pyroxene silicate mineral series enstatite (MgSiO_{3}) – ferrosilite (FeSiO_{3}). The magnesium rich members of the solid solution series are common rock-forming minerals found in igneous and metamorphic rocks. The intermediate composition, (Mg,Fe)SiO_{3}, has historically been known as hypersthene, although this name has been formally abandoned and replaced by orthopyroxene. When determined petrographically or chemically the composition is given as relative proportions of enstatite (En) and ferrosilite (Fs) (e.g., En_{80}Fs_{20}).

== Polymorphs and varieties ==
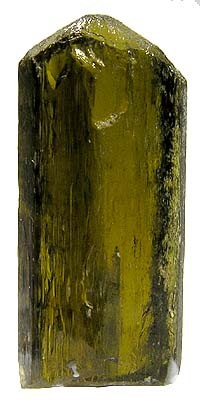
Gem quality enstatite from Myanmar (size: 2.4×1.0×0.8 cm)

Most natural crystals are orthorhombic (space group Pbca) although three polymorphs are known. The high temperature, low pressure polymorphs are protoenstatite and protoferrosilite (also orthorhombic, space group Pbcn) while the low temperature forms, clinoenstatite and clinoferrosilite, are monoclinic (space group P2_{1}/c).

Weathered enstatite with a small amount of iron takes on a submetallic luster and a bronze-like color. This material is termed bronzite, although it is more correctly called altered enstatite.

Bronzite and hypersthene were known long before enstatite, which was first described by G. A. Kenngott in 1855.

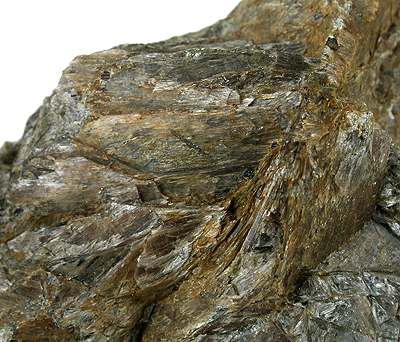
Bronzite variety from Bare Hills, Baltimore County, Maryland, USA (size: 9.6×7.5×4.9 cm)

An emerald-green variety of enstatite is called chrome-enstatite and is cut as a gemstone. The green color is caused by traces of chromium, hence the varietal name. In addition, black, chatoyant hypersthene and brownish bronzite are also used as semi-precious gemstones.

== Identification ==
Enstatite and the other orthorhombic pyroxenes are distinguished from those of the monoclinic series by their optical characteristics, such as straight extinction, much weaker double refraction and stronger pleochroism. They also have a prismatic cleavage that is perfect in two directions at 90 degrees. Enstatite is white, gray, greenish, or brown in color; its hardness is 5–6 on the Mohs scale, and its specific gravity is 3.2–3.3. This prismatic form is used in gemstones, and for academic purposes.

== Occurrence ==
Isolated crystals are rare, but orthopyroxene is an essential constituent of various types of igneous rocks and metamorphic rocks. Magnesian orthopyroxene occurs in plutonic rocks such as gabbro (norite) and diorite. It may form small idiomorphic phenocrysts and also groundmass grains in volcanic rocks such as basalt, andesite, and dacite.

Enstatite, close to En_{90}Fs_{10} in composition, is an essential mineral in typical peridotite and pyroxenite of the Earth's mantle. Xenoliths of peridotite are common in kimberlite and in some basalt. Measurements of the calcium, aluminum, and chromium contents of enstatite in these xenoliths have been crucial in reconstructing the depths from which the xenoliths were plucked by the ascending magmas.

Orthopyroxene is an important constituent of some metamorphic rocks such as granulite. Orthopyroxene near pure enstatite in composition occurs in some metamorphosed serpentines. Large crystals, a foot in length and mostly altered to steatite, were found in 1874 in the apatite veins traversing mica-schist and hornblende-schist at the apatite mine of Kjørstad, near Brevik in southern Norway.

Enstatite is a common mineral in meteorites. Crystals have been found in stony and iron meteorites, including one that fell at Breitenbach in the Ore Mountains, Bohemia. In some meteorites, together with olivine it forms the bulk of the material; it can occur in small spherical masses, or chondrules, with an internal radiated structure.

== In space ==
Enstatite is one of the few silicate minerals that have been observed in crystalline form outside the Solar System, particularly around evolved stars and planetary nebulae such as NGC 6302. Enstatite is thought to be one of the early stages for the formation of crystalline silicates in space. Many correlations have been noted between the occurrence of the mineral and the structure of the object around which it has been observed.

Enstatite is thought to be a main component of the E-type asteroids. The Hungaria asteroids are the main examples in the Solar System.

A layer of quartz and enstatite clouds above an iron cloud deck are thought to exist in the atmosphere of the young brown dwarf 2M2224-0158.

== See also ==
- Rhodonite – Single chain manganese inosilicate (MnSiO_{3})
- Wollastonite – Single chain calcium inosilicate (CaSiO_{3})
