= E-type asteroid =

Asteroid spectral type

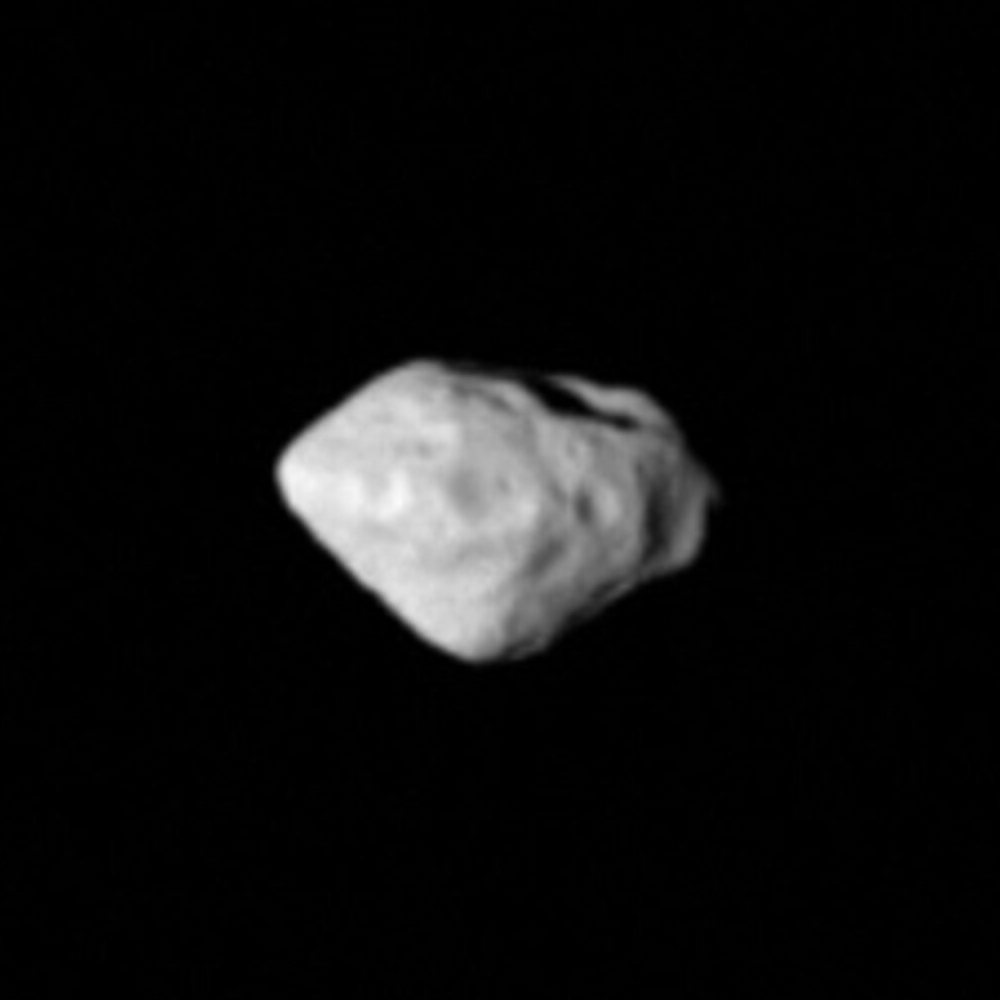
E-type asteroid 2867 Šteins

E-type (enstatite achondrite–type) asteroids are asteroids thought to have enstatite (MgSiO_{3}) achondrite surfaces. They form a large proportion of asteroids inward of the asteroid belt known as Hungaria asteroids, but rapidly become very rare as the asteroid belt proper is entered. Some are quite far from the inner edge of the asteroid belt, such as 64 Angelina. They are thought to have originated from the highly reduced mantle of a differentiated asteroid.

== Description ==
E-type asteroids have a high albedo (0.3 or higher), which distinguishes them from the more common M-type asteroids. Their spectrum is featureless flat to reddish. Probably because they originated from the edge of a larger parent body rather than a core, E-types are all small, with only two (44 Nysa and 64 Angelina) having diameters above 50 km (31 mi) and no others above 25 km (16 mi) (the biggest three also orbit atypically far, c. 3 AU, from the Sun). Aubrites (enstatite achondrite meteorites) are believed to come from E-type asteroids, because aubrites could be linked to the E-type asteroid 3103 Eger.

This grouping may be related to the Xe-type of the SMASS classification.

== Observational history ==
In 1975, polarimetry and color measurements revealed that the asteroid 44 Nysa had an enstatite-rich surface unlike any previously observed asteroid. Two more asteroids—64 Angelina and 434 Hungaria—were later found to share similar compositions as Nysa, which led astronomers to introduce the E-type asteroid classification for these objects in 1977.

== E-Belt ==
The E-type asteroids of the Hungaria family are thought to be the remains of the hypothetical E-belt asteroid population. The dispersal of most of that hypothetical E-Belt might have been caused by the outward migration of the gas giants of the Solar System according to simulations done under the Nice model – and these dispersed E-Belt asteroids might in turn have been the impactors of the Late Heavy Bombardment.

== Exploration ==
On 5 September 2008, ESA's robotic space probe Rosetta visited the E-type asteroid 2867 Šteins. Spectral data from the spacecraft confirmed the asteroid was composed mainly of iron-poor minerals such as enstatite (magnesium-rich pyroxene), forsterite (magnesium-rich olivine) and feldspar.

== See also ==
- Asteroid spectral types
- L-type asteroid
- S-type asteroid
- X-type asteroid
- 2867 Šteins
